= 2003 Rugby World Cup Pool D =

Pool D was one of four pools at the 2003 Rugby World Cup into which the 20 participating teams were divided. The pool included New Zealand and Wales, who both qualified automatically having reached the quarter-finals of the 1999 tournament, along with Italy, Canada and Tonga.

== Teams ==
Team	Method of qualification	Date of qualification	Apps.	Last	Previous best performance	IRB World Ranking (6 October 2003)
New Zealand	Quarter-finalists in 1999	14 October 1999	5th	1999	Champions (1987)	2
Wales	Quarter-finalists in 1999	14 October 1999	5th	1999	Third place (1987)	10
Italy	Europe 2	28 September 2002	5th	1999	Pool stage (1987, 1991, 1995, 1999)	13
Canada	Americas 1	13 October 2002	5th	1999	Quarter-finals (1991)	16
Tonga	Repechage 2	23 March 2003	4th	1999	Pool stage (1987, 1995, 1999)	12

== Standings ==
Pos	Team	Pld	W	D	L	PF	PA	PD	B	Pts	Qualification
1	New Zealand	4	4	0	0	282	57	+225	4	20	Advance to quarter-finals, and qualification to the 2007 Rugby World Cup
2	Wales	4	3	0	1	132	98	+34	2	14	Advance to quarter-finals, and qualification to the 2007 Rugby World Cup
3	Italy	4	2	0	2	77	123	−46	0	8	Qualification to the 2007 Rugby World Cup
4	Canada	4	1	0	3	54	135	−81	1	5	
5	Tonga	4	0	0	4	46	178	−132	1	1	

In the quarter-finals:

- The winners of Pool D advanced to play the runners-up of Pool C.
- The runners-up of Pool D advanced to play the winners of Pool C.

== Matches ==
=== New Zealand vs Italy ===
11 October 2003

New Zealand	70–7	Italy
Try: B. Thorn; R. Thorne; Howlett (2); Spencer (2); Rokocoko (2); Marshall; Carter; MacDonald; Con: Carter (6); Pen: Spencer	Report	Try: Phillips; Con: Peens

Docklands Stadium, Melbourne
Attendance: 41,715
Referee: Andrew Cole (Australia)

FB	15	Mils Muliaina
RW	14	Doug Howlett
OC	13	Tana Umaga
IC	12	Dan Carter
LW	11	Joe Rokocoko
FH	10	Carlos Spencer
SH	9	Justin Marshall
N8	8	Jerry Collins
OF	7	Richie McCaw
BF	6	Reuben Thorne (c)
RL	5	Chris Jack
LL	4	Brad Thorn
TP	3	Greg Somerville
HK	2	Keven Mealamu
LP	1	Dave Hewett
Replacements:
HK	16	Mark Hammett
PR	17	Kees Meeuws
N8	18	Rodney So'oialo
FL	19	Marty Holah
SH	20	Steve Devine
CE	21	Ma'a Nonu
FH	22	Leon MacDonald
Coach:
John Mitchell

FB	15	Gert Peens
RW	14	Mirco Bergamasco
OC	13	Andrea Masi
IC	12	Matteo Barbini
LW	11	Nicola Mazzucato
FH	10	Francesco Mazzariol
SH	9	Matteo Mazzantini
N8	8	Matthew Phillips
OF	7	Mauro Bergamasco
BF	6	Cristian Bezzi
RL	5	Carlo Checchinato (c)
LL	4	Scott Palmer
TP	3	Ramiro Martínez
HK	2	Carlo Festuccia
LP	1	Salvatore Perugini
Replacements:
HK	16	Fabio Ongaro
PR	17	Martín Castrogiovanni
N8	18	Sergio Parisse
FL	19	Andrea Benatti
SH	20	Alessandro Troncon
FH	21	Rima Wakarua
CE	22	Gonzalo Canale
Coach:
(New Zealand) John Kirwan

=== Wales vs Canada ===
12 October 2003

Wales	41–10	Canada
Try: Parker; Cooper; M. Jones; Charvis; Thomas; Con: Harris (5); Pen: Harris (2)	Report	Try: Tkachuk; Con: Pritchard; Drop: Ross

Docklands Stadium, Melbourne
Attendance: 24,874
Referee: Chris White (England)

FB	15	Kevin Morgan
RW	14	Gareth Thomas
OC	13	Sonny Parker
IC	12	Iestyn Harris
LW	11	Mark Jones
FH	10	Ceri Sweeney
SH	9	Gareth Cooper
N8	8	Colin Charvis (c)
OF	7	Martyn Williams
BF	6	Dafydd Jones
RL	5	Gareth Llewellyn
LL	4	Brent Cockbain
TP	3	Gethin Jenkins
HK	2	Robin McBryde
LP	1	Duncan Jones
Replacements:
HK	16	Huw Bennett
PR	17	Adam Jones
LK	18	Robert Sidoli
FL	19	Jonathan Thomas
SH	20	Dwayne Peel
CE	21	Mark Taylor
FB	22	Rhys Williams
Coach:
(New Zealand) Steve Hansen

FB	15	James Pritchard
RW	14	Dave Lougheed
OC	13	John Cannon
IC	12	Marco di Girolamo
LW	11	Winston Stanley
FH	10	Bobby Ross
SH	9	Morgan Williams
N8	8	Josh Jackson
OF	7	Adam van Staveren
BF	6	Al Charron (c)
RL	5	Mike James
LL	4	Colin Yukes
TP	3	Jon Thiel
HK	2	Mark Lawson
LP	1	Rod Snow
Replacements:
HK	16	Aaron Abrams
PR	17	Kevin Tkachuk
PR	18	Garth Cooke
LK	19	Jamie Cudmore
FL	20	Ryan Banks
SH	21	Ed Fairhurst
CE	22	Ryan Smith
Coach:
(Australia) David Clark

=== Italy vs Tonga ===
15 October 2003

Italy	36–12	Tonga
Try: M. Dallan; D. Dallan (2); Con: Wakarua (3); Pen: Wakarua (5)	Report	Try: Payne; Tuʻifua; Con: Tuipulotu

Canberra Stadium, Canberra
Attendance: 18,967
Referee: Steve Walsh (New Zealand)

FB	15	Gonzalo Canale
RW	14	Nicola Mazzucato
OC	13	Cristian Stoica
IC	12	Manuel Dallan
LW	11	Denis Dallan
FH	10	Rima Wakarua
SH	9	Alessandro Troncon (c)
N8	8	Sergio Parisse
OF	7	Aaron Persico
BF	6	Andrea de Rossi
RL	5	Marco Bortolami
LL	4	Santiago Dellapè
TP	3	Martín Castrogiovanni
HK	2	Fabio Ongaro
LP	1	Andrea Lo Cicero
Replacements:
HK	16	Carlo Festuccia
PR	17	Salvatore Perugini
LK	18	Carlo Checchinato
FL	19	Mauro Bergamasco
SH	20	Matteo Mazzantini
FH	21	Francesco Mazzariol
FB	22	Andrea Masi
Coach:
(New Zealand) John Kirwan

FB	15	Pierre Hola
RW	14	Sione Fonua
OC	13	Gus Leger
IC	12	John Payne
LW	11	Tevita Tuʻifua
FH	10	Sateki Tuipulotu
SH	9	Sililo Martens
N8	8	Benhur Kivalu
OF	7	Ipolito Fenukitau
BF	6	Inoke Afeaki (c)
RL	5	Milton Ngauamo
LL	4	Viliami Vaki
TP	3	Heamani Lavaka
HK	2	Ephraim Taukafa
LP	1	Tonga Leaʻaetoa
Replacements:
HK	16	Viliami Maʻasi
PR	17	Kisi Pulu
FL	18	Usaia Latu
FL	19	Stanley Afeaki
SH	20	Tony Alatini
FH	21	Johnny Ngauamo
WG	22	Sila Vaʻenuku
Coach:
(New Zealand) Jim Love

=== New Zealand vs Canada ===
17 October 2003

New Zealand	68–6	Canada
Try: Ralph (2); So'oialo (2); Muliaina (4); Meeuws; Nonu; Con: Carter (9)	Report	Pen: Barker (2)

Docklands Stadium, Melbourne
Attendance: 38,899
Referee: Tony Spreadbury (England)

FB	15	Leon MacDonald
RW	14	Mils Muliaina
OC	13	Ma'a Nonu
IC	12	Dan Carter
LW	11	Caleb Ralph
FH	10	Carlos Spencer
SH	9	Steve Devine
N8	8	Rodney So'oialo
OF	7	Marty Holah
BF	6	Reuben Thorne (c)
RL	5	Chris Jack
LL	4	Brad Thorn
TP	3	Kees Meeuws
HK	2	Mark Hammett
LP	1	Carl Hoeft
Replacements:
PR	16	Corey Flynn
PR	17	Dave Hewett
FL	18	Richie McCaw
FL	19	Daniel Braid
SH	20	Byron Kelleher
FH	21	Doug Howlett
WG	22	Ben Blair
Coach:
John Mitchell

FB	15	Quentin Fyffe
RW	14	Matt King
OC	13	John Cannon
IC	12	Marco di Girolamo
LW	11	Sean Fauth
FH	10	Jared Barker
SH	9	Ed Fairhurst
N8	8	Jeff Reid
OF	7	Jim Douglas
BF	6	Ryan Banks (c)
RL	5	Ed Knaggs
LL	4	Jamie Cudmore
TP	3	Garth Cooke
HK	2	Aaron Abrams
LP	1	Kevin Tkachuk
Replacements:
HK	16	Mark Lawson
PR	17	Rod Snow
FL	18	Adam van Staveren
LK	19	Colin Yukes
SH	20	Morgan Williams
CE	21	Ryan Smith
CE	22	Nik Witkowski
Coach:
(Australia) David Clark

=== Wales vs Tonga ===
19 October 2003

Wales	27–20	Tonga
Try: Cooper; M. Williams; Con: S. Jones; Pen: S. Jones (4); Drop: M. Williams	Report	Try: Hola; Kivalu; Lavaka; Con: Hola; Pen: Hola

Canberra Stadium, Canberra
Attendance: 19,806
Referee: Paul Honiss (New Zealand)

FB	15	Rhys Williams
RW	14	Mark Jones
OC	13	Mark Taylor
IC	12	Iestyn Harris
LW	11	Tom Shanklin
FH	10	Stephen Jones
SH	9	Gareth Cooper
N8	8	Alix Popham
OF	7	Colin Charvis (c)
BF	6	Dafydd Jones
RL	5	Robert Sidoli
LL	4	Gareth Llewellyn
TP	3	Gethin Jenkins
HK	2	Mefin Davies
LP	1	Iestyn Thomas
Replacements:
HK	16	Huw Bennett
PR	17	Adam Jones
LK	18	Chris Wyatt
FL	19	Martyn Williams
SH	20	Dwayne Peel
WG	21	Shane Williams
FB	22	Garan Evans
Coach:
(New Zealand) Steve Hansen

FB	15	Pierre Hola
RW	14	Sione Fonua
OC	13	Suka Hufanga
IC	12	John Payne
LW	11	Tevita Tuʻifua
FH	10	Sateki Tuipulotu
SH	9	Sililo Martens
N8	8	Benhur Kivalu (c)
OF	7	Stanley Afeaki
BF	6	Ipolito Fenukitau
RL	5	Viliami Vaki
LL	4	Usaia Latu
TP	3	Heamani Lavaka
HK	2	Viliami Maʻasi
LP	1	Kisi Pulu
Replacements:
HK	16	Ephraim Taukafa
PR	17	Tonga Leaʻaetoa
LK	18	Milton Ngauamo
N8	19	Nisifolo Naufahu
SH	20	David Palu
CE	21	Gus Leger
WG	22	Sila Vaʻenuku
Coach:
(New Zealand) Jim Love

=== Italy vs Canada ===
21 October 2003

Italy	19–14	Canada
Try: Parisse; Con: Wakarua; Pen: Wakarua (4)	Report	Try: Fyffe; Pen: Barker (3)

Canberra Stadium, Canberra
Attendance: 20,515
Referee: Paddy O'Brien (New Zealand)

FB	15	Gonzalo Canale
RW	14	Mirco Bergamasco
OC	13	Cristian Stoica
IC	12	Manuel Dallan
LW	11	Denis Dallan
FH	10	Rima Wakarua
SH	9	Alessandro Troncon (c)
N8	8	Sergio Parisse
OF	7	Aaron Persico
BF	6	Andrea de Rossi
RL	5	Marco Bortolami
LL	4	Santiago Dellapè
TP	3	Martín Castrogiovanni
HK	2	Fabio Ongaro
LP	1	Andrea Lo Cicero
Replacements:
HK	16	Carlo Festuccia
PR	17	Salvatore Perugini
LK	18	Carlo Checchinato
FL	19	Scott Palmer
SH	20	Matteo Mazzantini
FH	21	Francesco Mazzariol
FB	22	Andrea Masi
Coach:
(New Zealand) John Kirwan

FB	15	Quentin Fyffe
RW	14	Winston Stanley
OC	13	John Cannon
IC	12	Marco di Girolamo
LW	11	Dave Lougheed
FH	10	Jared Barker
SH	9	Morgan Williams
N8	8	Ryan Banks
OF	7	Jim Douglas
BF	6	Jamie Cudmore
RL	5	Al Charron (c)
LL	4	Colin Yukes
TP	3	Jon Thiel
HK	2	Mark Lawson
LP	1	Rod Snow
Replacements:
HK	16	Aaron Abrams
PR	17	Kevin Tkachuk
N8	18	Jeff Reid
N8	19	Josh Jackson
WG	20	Sean Fauth
FH	21	Bobby Ross
WG	22	Matt King
Coach:
(Australia) David Clark

=== New Zealand vs Tonga ===
24 October 2003

New Zealand	91–7	Tonga
Try: Braid; Carter; Flynn; Ralph (2); Spencer; Meeuws; Penalty try Muliaina (2); MacDonald; Howlett (2); Con: MacDonald (12); Spencer	Report	Try: Hola; Con: Tuipulotu

Suncorp Stadium, Brisbane
Attendance: 47,588
Referee: Pablo De Luca (Argentina)

FB	15	Mils Muliaina
RW	14	Doug Howlett
OC	13	Leon MacDonald
IC	12	Dan Carter
LW	11	Caleb Ralph
FH	10	Carlos Spencer
SH	9	Justin Marshall
N8	8	Rodney So'oialo
OF	7	Daniel Braid
BF	6	Reuben Thorne (c)
RL	5	Ali Williams
LL	4	Brad Thorn
TP	3	Greg Somerville
HK	2	Corey Flynn
LP	1	Kees Meeuws
Replacements:
HK	16	Keven Mealamu
PR	17	Dave Hewett
FL	18	Jerry Collins
FL	19	Marty Holah
FL	20	Richie McCaw
CE	21	Ma'a Nonu
CE	22	Ben Atiga
Coach:
John Mitchell

FB	15	Sila Vaʻenuku
RW	14	Sione Fonua
OC	13	Suka Hufanga
IC	12	John Payne
LW	11	Tevita Tuʻifua
FH	10	Pierre Hola
SH	9	Sililo Martens
N8	8	Benhur Kivalu (c)
OF	7	Ipolito Fenukitau
BF	6	Stanley Afeaki
RL	5	Viliami Vaki
LL	4	Usaia Latu
TP	3	Heamani Lavaka
HK	2	Viliami Maʻasi
LP	1	Kisi Pulu
Replacements:
HK	16	Ephraim Taukafa
PR	17	Tonga Leaʻaetoa
LK	18	Milton Ngauamo
FL	19	Edward Langi
SH	20	David Palu
FB	21	Sateki Tuipulotu
WG	22	Gus Leger
Coach:
(New Zealand) Jim Love

=== Italy vs Wales ===
25 October 2003

Italy	15–27	Wales
Pen: Wakarua (5)	Report	Try: M. Jones; Parker; D. Jones; Con: Harris (3); Pen: Harris (2)

Canberra Stadium, Canberra
Attendance: 22,641
Referee: Andrew Cole (Australia)

FB	15	Gonzalo Canale
RW	14	Nicola Mazzucato
OC	13	Cristian Stoica
IC	12	Andrea Masi
LW	11	Denis Dallan
FH	10	Rima Wakarua
SH	9	Alessandro Troncon (c)
N8	8	Sergio Parisse
OF	7	Aaron Persico
BF	6	Andrea de Rossi
RL	5	Carlo Checchinato
LL	4	Santiago Dellapè
TP	3	Andrea Lo Cicero
HK	2	Fabio Ongaro
LP	1	Martín Castrogiovanni
Replacements:
HK	16	Carlo Festuccia
PR	17	Salvatore Perugini
N8	18	Matthew Phillips
FL	19	Scott Palmer
LK	20	Cristian Bezzi
FH	21	Francesco Mazzariol
WG	22	Mirco Bergamasco
Coach:
(New Zealand) John Kirwan

FB	15	Kevin Morgan
RW	14	Mark Jones
OC	13	Sonny Parker
IC	12	Iestyn Harris
LW	11	Gareth Thomas
FH	10	Ceri Sweeney
SH	9	Dwayne Peel
N8	8	Colin Charvis (c)
OF	7	Martyn Williams
BF	6	Dafydd Jones
RL	5	Gareth Llewellyn
LL	4	Brent Cockbain
TP	3	Adam Jones
HK	2	Robin McBryde
LP	1	Duncan Jones
Replacements:
HK	16	Mefin Davies
PR	17	Gethin Jenkins
LK	18	Robert Sidoli
FL	19	Jonathan Thomas
SH	20	Gareth Cooper
FH	21	Stephen Jones
FB	22	Rhys Williams
Coach:
(New Zealand) Steve Hansen

=== Canada vs Tonga ===
29 October 2003

Canada	24–7	Tonga
Try: Fauth; Abrams; Con: Pritchard; Pen: Ross (4)	Report	Try: Kivalu; Con: Hola

WIN Stadium, Wollongong
Attendance: 15,630
Referee: Alain Rolland (Ireland)

FB	15	Quentin Fyffe
RW	14	Sean Fauth
OC	13	Nik Witkowski
IC	12	Marco di Girolamo
LW	11	Winston Stanley
FH	10	Bobby Ross
SH	9	Morgan Williams
N8	8	Josh Jackson
OF	7	Adam van Staveren
BF	6	Jamie Cudmore
RL	5	Mike James
LL	4	Al Charron (c)
TP	3	Garth Cooke
HK	2	Mark Lawson
LP	1	Rod Snow
Replacements:
HK	16	Aaron Abrams
PR	17	Kevin Tkachuk
LK	18	Colin Yukes
N8	19	Jeff Reid
SH	20	Ed Fairhurst
CE	21	Ryan Smith
FB	22	James Pritchard
Coach:
(Australia) David Clark

FB	15	Gus Leger
RW	14	Pila Fifita
OC	13	Johnny Ngauamo
IC	12	John Payne
LW	11	Sione Fonua
FH	10	Pierre Hola
SH	9	Sililo Martens
N8	8	Benhur Kivalu
OF	7	Sione Tuʻamoheloa
BF	6	Nisifolo Naufahu
RL	5	Inoke Afeaki (c)
LL	4	Milton Ngauamo
TP	3	Heamani Lavaka
HK	2	Ephraim Taukafa
LP	1	Tonga Leaʻaetoa
Replacements:
HK	16	Viliami Maʻasi
PR	17	Kafalosi Tonga
FL	18	Usaia Latu
FL	19	Ipolito Fenukitau
SH	20	David Palu
CE	21	Suka Hufanga
LK	22	Viliami Vaki
Coach:
(New Zealand) Jim Love

=== New Zealand vs Wales ===
2 November 2003

New Zealand	53–37	Wales
Try: Rokocoko (2); MacDonald; Williams; Howlett (2); Spencer; Mauger; Con: MacDonald (5); Pen: MacDonald	Report	Try: Taylor; Parker; Charvis; S. Williams; Con: S. Jones (4); Pen: S. Jones (3)

Stadium Australia, Sydney
Attendance: 80,012
Referee: André Watson (South Africa)

FB	15	Mils Muliaina
RW	14	Doug Howlett
OC	13	Leon MacDonald
IC	12	Aaron Mauger
LW	11	Joe Rokocoko
FH	10	Carlos Spencer
SH	9	Justin Marshall
N8	8	Jerry Collins
OF	7	Richie McCaw
BF	6	Reuben Thorne (c)
RL	5	Ali Williams
LL	4	Brad Thorn
TP	3	Greg Somerville
HK	2	Keven Mealamu
LP	1	Dave Hewett
Replacements:
HK	16	Mark Hammett
PR	17	Kees Meeuws
N8	18	Rodney So'oialo
FL	19	Marty Holah
SH	20	Byron Kelleher
FH	21	Dan Carter
CE	22	Ma'a Nonu
Coach:
John Mitchell

FB	15	Garan Evans
RW	14	Shane Williams
OC	13	Mark Taylor
IC	12	Sonny Parker
LW	11	Tom Shanklin
FH	10	Stephen Jones
SH	9	Gareth Cooper
N8	8	Alix Popham
OF	7	Colin Charvis (c)
BF	6	Jonathan Thomas
RL	5	Robert Sidoli
LL	4	Brent Cockbain
TP	3	Adam Jones
HK	2	Robin McBryde
LP	1	Iestyn Thomas
Replacements:
HK	16	Mefin Davies
PR	17	Gethin Jenkins
LK	18	Chris Wyatt
FL	19	Dafydd Jones
SH	20	Dwayne Peel
FH	21	Ceri Sweeney
WG	22	Gareth Thomas
Coach:
(New Zealand) Steve Hansen
