= 2005 Wales rugby union tour of North America =

- Manager: Alan Phillips
- Coach: Mike Ruddock
- Tour captain: Mark Taylor
Summary
P	W	D	L
Total
2	2	0	0
Test match
2	2	0	0
Opponent
P	W	D	L
United States
1	1	0	0
Canada
1	1	0	0

Tour chronology
- ← 2004 Argentina/South Africa 2006 Argentina →

The Wales national rugby union team toured North America in June 2005, playing test matches against the national teams of the United States and Canada. Due to the involvement of 10 Welsh players in the 2005 British & Irish Lions tour to New Zealand, the Wales squad included seven uncapped players. Centre Mark Taylor was named as captain in place of incumbent captain Colin Charvis. Wales won both tests, recording a 77–3 win over the United States in Hartford, Connecticut, and a 60–3 win over Canada in Toronto. They scored 20 tries in the process (11 against the United States and 9 against Canada) while conceding only one penalty goal in each match.

== Squad ==
Wales coach Mike Ruddock named a 29-man squad for the tour, including seven uncapped players, four of whom were part of the Wales under-21 team that won the Grand Slam in the Six Nations. Despite the inclusion of incumbent captain Colin Charvis in the squad, centre Mark Taylor was named as captain for the tour.

Name	Position	Club	Notes
Mefin Davies	Hooker	Gloucester	
Matthew Rees	Hooker	Llanelli Scarlets	
T. Rhys Thomas	Hooker	Cardiff Blues	
Ben Broster	Prop	Saracens	
Adam Jones	Prop	Ospreys	
Duncan Jones	Prop	Ospreys	
John Yapp	Prop	Cardiff Blues	
Luke Charteris	Lock	Newport Gwent Dragons	
Brent Cockbain	Lock	Ospreys	
Ian Gough	Lock	Newport Gwent Dragons	
Robert Sidoli	Lock	Cardiff Blues	
Colin Charvis	Back row	Newcastle Falcons	
Ryan Jones	Back row	Ospreys	
Alix Popham	Back row	Leeds Tykes	
Richie Pugh	Back row	Ospreys	
Robin Sowden-Taylor	Back row	Cardiff Blues	
Jonathan Thomas	Back row	Ospreys	
Mike Phillips	Scrum-half	Llanelli Scarlets	
Andy Williams	Scrum-half	Bath	
Matt Jones	Fly-half	Ospreys	
Nicky Robinson	Fly-half	Cardiff Blues	
Ceri Sweeney	Fly-half	Newport Gwent Dragons	
Mark Taylor	Centre	Sale Sharks	Captain
Matthew Watkins	Centre	Llanelli Scarlets	
Chris Czekaj	Wing	Cardiff Blues	
Craig Morgan	Wing	Cardiff Blues	
Tal Selley	Wing	Llanelli Scarlets	
Kevin Morgan	Full-back	Newport Gwent Dragons	
Rhys Williams	Full-back	Cardiff Blues	

== Results ==
=== United States v Wales ===
4 June 2005

United States	3–77	Wales
Pen: Hercus	Report	Try: Sweeney; C. Morgan; N. Robinson; K. Morgan; J. Thomas; R. Williams; Charvis (2); Phillips; Selley; Pugh; Con: Sweeney (11)

Rentschler Field, Hartford, Connecticut
Attendance: 5,972
Referee: Craig Joubert (South Africa)

FB	15	Francois Viljoen
RW	14	Mike Palefau
OC	13	Paul Emerick
IC	12	Albert Tuipulotu
LW	11	David Fee
FH	10	Mike Hercus
SH	9	Doug Rowe
N8	8	Kort Schubert (c)
OF	7	Todd Clever
BF	6	Andrew Ryland
RL	5	Brian Surgener
LL	4	Alec Parker
TP	3	Chris Osentowski
HK	2	Matt Wyatt
LP	1	Mike MacDonald
Replacements:
HK	16	Mark Griffin
PR	17	Mike French
LK	18	Mike Mangan
FL	19	Tony Petruzzella
FB	20	Peter Galicz
CE	21	Salesi Sika
FH	22	Matt Sherman
Coach:
Tom Billups

FB	15	Kevin Morgan
RW	14	Rhys Williams
OC	13	Mark Taylor (c)
IC	12	Ceri Sweeney
LW	11	Craig Morgan
FH	10	Nicky Robinson
SH	9	Mike Phillips
N8	8	Ryan Jones
OF	7	Colin Charvis
BF	6	Jonathan Thomas
RL	5	Luke Charteris
LL	4	Brent Cockbain
TP	3	Adam Jones
HK	2	Matthew Rees
LP	1	Duncan Jones
Replacements:
HK	16	T. Rhys Thomas
PR	17	Ben Broster
LK	18	Ian Gough
FL	19	Richie Pugh
SH	20	Andy Williams
CE	21	Matthew Watkins
WG	22	Tal Selley
Coach:
Mike Ruddock

=== Canada v Wales ===
11 June 2005

Canada	3–60	Wales
Pen: Daypuck	Report	Try: Taylor; Charvis; Broster; Thomas (2); Czekaj; Morgan; R. Williams; Popham; Con: Sweeney (6); Pen: Sweeney

York Stadium, Toronto
Attendance: 12,800
Referee: Matt Goddard (Australia)

FB	15	Derek Daypuck
RW	14	Quentin Fyffe
OC	13	Matt King
IC	12	John Cannon
LW	11	Stirling Richmond
FH	10	Ryan Smith
SH	9	Morgan Williams
N8	8	Colin Yukes
OF	7	Stan McKeen
BF	6	Mike Webb
RL	5	Jamie Cudmore
LL	4	Luke Tait
TP	3	Garth Cooke
HK	2	Aaron Abrams
LP	1	Kevin Tkachuk
Replacements:
HK	16	Dan Pletch
PR	17	Pat Dunkley
LK	18	Forrest Gainer
FL	19	Josh Jackson
SH	20	Pat Fleck
FH	21	Ed Fairhurst
WG	22	Simon Pacey
Coach:
Ric Suggitt

FB	15	Kevin Morgan
RW	14	Rhys Williams
OC	13	Mark Taylor (c)
IC	12	Ceri Sweeney
LW	11	Chris Czekaj
FH	10	Nicky Robinson
SH	9	Mike Phillips
N8	8	Alix Popham
OF	7	Colin Charvis
BF	6	Jonathan Thomas
RL	5	Robert Sidoli
LL	4	Luke Charteris
TP	3	Ben Broster
HK	2	T. Rhys Thomas
LP	1	Duncan Jones
Replacements:
HK	16	Mefin Davies
PR	17	John Yapp
FL	18	Robin Sowden-Taylor
LK	19	Brent Cockbain
SH	20	Andy Williams
FH	21	Matt Jones
CE	22	Matthew Watkins
Coach:
Mike Ruddock
