= 2003 Ireland rugby union tour of the Southern Hemisphere =

- Coach: Eddie O'Sullivan
- Top test point scorer: Ronan O'Gara (45)
- Top test try scorer: John Kelly (3)
Summary
P	W	D	L
Total
3	2	0	1
Test match
3	1	0	2
Opponent
P	W	D	L
Australia
1	0	0	1
Tonga
1	1	0	0
Samoa
1	1	0	0

Tour chronology
- ← New Zealand 2002 South Africa 2004 →

The Ireland national rugby union team toured the South Seas in June 2003, playing matches against Australia, Tonga and Samoa. Head coach Eddie O'Sullivan initially selected a squad of 41 players for the tour. Keith Wood also travelled with the tour party as an additional player for training purposes. However Rob Henderson, Denis Hickie and Anthony Foley all subsequently withdrew due to injuries and Frankie Sheahan had to return home after testing positive for Salbutamol. Aiden McCullen and Mike Mullins were both then called up as replacements. Mark McHugh marked his senior international debut with a try against Tonga, while McCullen and Anthony Horgan made their senior international debuts against Samoa. In the same game, Ronan O'Gara gave a man of the match performance, scoring 32 of Ireland's 40 points.

== Touring party ==
- Manager: Eddie O'Sullivan
- Captains: David Humphreys and Reggie Corrigan

=== Backs ===
- Jonny Bell (Dungannon/Ulster)
- Paul Burke (NEC Harlequins)
- Gordon D'Arcy (Lansdowne/Leinster)
- Girvan Dempsey (Terenure College/Leinster)
- Guy Easterby (Llanelli Scarlets)
- Anthony Horgan (Cork Constitution/Munster)
- Tyrone Howe (Dungannon/Ulster)
- David Humphreys (Dungannon/Ulster)
- John Kelly (Cork Constitution/Munster)
- Kevin Maggs (Bath Rugby)
- Mark McHugh (St. Mary's College/Connacht)
- Mike Mullins (Young Munster/Munster)
- Geordan Murphy (Leicester Tigers)
- Ronan O'Gara (Cork Constitution/Munster)
- Brian O'Meara (Cork Constitution/Leinster)
- David Quinlan (Blackrock College/Leinster)
- Peter Stringer (Shannon/Munster)
- James Topping (Ballymena/Ulster)
- Paddy Wallace (Ballymena/Ulster)

=== Forwards ===
- Simon Best (Belfast Harlequins/Ulster)
- Emmet Byrne (St. Mary's College/Leinster)
- Shane Byrne (Blackrock College/Leinster)
- Reggie Corrigan (Greystones/Leinster)
- Victor Costello (St. Mary's College/Leinster)
- Leo Cullen (Blackrock College/Leinster)
- Kieron Dawson (London Irish)
- Simon Easterby (Llanelli Scarlets)
- Justin Fitzpatrick (Dungannon/Ulster)
- Keith Gleeson (St. Mary's College/Leinster)
- Marcus Horan (Shannon/Munster)
- Gary Longwell (Ballymena/Ulster)
- Aiden McCullen (Leinster)
- Eric Miller (Terenure College/Leinster)
- Donncha O'Callaghan (Cork Constitution/Munster)
- Paul O'Connell (Young Munster/Munster)
- Malcolm O'Kelly (St. Mary's College/Leinster)
- Alan Quinlan (Shannon/Munster)
- Paul Shields (Ballymena/Ulster)
- David Wallace (Garryowen/Munster)

== Matches ==
=== Australia ===
7 June 2003

Australia	45–16	Ireland
Try: Flatley, Gregan 2 S Kefu, Latham; 1 penalty try	Report	Try: J Kelly; Con: Humphreys; Pen: Humphreys 2, O'Gara

Subiaco Oval, Perth
Attendance: 40,000
Referee: Nigel Williams (Wales)

Australia: 15. Chris Latham, 14. Wendell Sailor, 13. Morgan Turinui, 12. Steve Kefu, 11. Joe Roff, 10. Elton Flatley, 7. George Gregan (c), 6. Bill Young, 5. Jeremy Paul, 4. Patricio Noriega, 3. David Giffin, 2. Nathan Sharpe, 1. David Lyons, 9. George Smith – Replacements: 16. Brendan Cannon, 17. Ben Darwin, 18. Dan Vickerman, 19. Phil Waugh, 20. Chris Whitaker, 21. Nathan Grey, 22. Lote Tuqiri

Ireland: 15. Girvan Dempsey, 14. James Topping, 13. Geordan Murphy, 12. Kevin Maggs, 11. John Kelly, 10. David Humphreys (c), 7. Keith Gleeson, 6. Alan Quinlan, 5. Malcolm O'Kelly, 4. Gary Longwell, 3. Reggie Corrigan, 2. Shane Byrne, 1. Marcus Horan, 9. Peter Stringer – Replacements: 17. Emmet Byrne, 18. Paul O'Connell, 21. Ronan O'Gara – Unused: 16. Paul Shields, 19. Eric Miller, 20. Guy Easterby, 22. Tyrone Howe

=== Tonga ===
14 June 2003

Tonga	19–40	Ireland
Try: Hola 2 Pen: Hola 3	Report	Try: Bell, Easterby 2, J Kelly 2, McHugh; Con: O'Gara 2 Pen: O'Gara 2

Teufaiva, Nukuʻalofa
Attendance: 10,000
Referee: Steve Walsh (New Zealand)

Tonga: 15. Gus Leger, 14. Pierre Hola, 13. Johnny Ngauamo, 12. John Payne, 11. Simana Mafileʻo, 10. Toni Alatini, 9. David Palu, 1. Tonga Leaʻaetoa, 2. Vili Maʻasi, 3. Hemani Lavaka, 4. Milton Ngauamo, 5. Inoke Afeaki (c), 6. Nisifolo Naufahu, 7. Stanley Afeaki, 8. Saia Latu – Replacements: 16. Ephraim Taukafa, 17. Kisi Pulu, 18. Viliami Vaki, 21. Taniela Tulia – Unused: 19. Benhur Kivalu, 20. Willie Gibbons, 22. Tevita Tuʻifua

Ireland: 15. Mark McHugh, 14. John Kelly, 13. Mike Mullins, 12. Jonny Bell, 11. Tyrone Howe, 10. Ronan O'Gara, 9. Guy Easterby, 8. Eric Miller, 7. Kieron Dawson, 6. Simon Easterby, 5. Paul O'Connell, 4. Leo Cullen, 3. Reggie Corrigan (c), 2. Shane Byrne, 1. Justin Fitzpatrick – Replacements: 17. Simon Best, 18. Donncha O'Callaghan, 19. David Wallace, 22. Gordon D'Arcy – Unused: 16. Paul Shields, 20. Brian O'Meara, 21. Paul Burke

=== Samoa ===
20 June 2003

Samoa	14–40	Ireland
Try: Fanu'atanu, Va'a; Con: Va'a 2	Report	Try: Miller, O'Gara 2 Con: O'Gara 2 Pen: Burke, O'Gara 5 Drop: O'Gara

Apia Park, Apia
Attendance: 10,000
Referee: Paul Honiss (New Zealand)

Samoa: 15. Fa'atonu Fili, 14. Lome Fa'atau, 13. Dale Rasmussen, 12. Brian Lima, 11. Ron Fanu'atanu, 10. Earl Va'a, 9. Denning Tyrell, 8. Kas Lealamanu'a, 7. Trevor Leota, 6. Jeremy Tomuli, 5. Opeta Palepoi, 4. Kitiona Viliamu, 3. Leo Lafaiali'i, 2. Maurie Fa'asavalu, 1. Semo Sititi (c) – Replacements: 16. Jonathan Meredith, 17. Tamato Leupolu, 18. Des Tuiali'i, 20. Steve So'oialo, 21. Gaolo Elisara – Unused: 19. Ponali Tapelu, 22. Dom Feau'nati

Ireland: 15. Girvan Dempsey, 14. John Kelly, 13. Mike Mullins, 12. Jonny Bell, 11. Anthony Horgan, 10. Ronan O'Gara, 9. Guy Easterby, 8. Eric Miller, 7. Aidan McCullen, 6. Simon Easterby, 5. Paul O'Connell, 4. Leo Cullen, 3. Reggie Corrigan (c), 2. Shane Byrne, 1. Marcus Horan – Replacements: 16. Paul Burke, 17. Gordon D'Arcy, 18. Donncha O'Callaghan, 19. Paul Shields, 20. Emmet Byrne, 21. Brian O'Meara, 22. David Wallace
