= 2004 Canada rugby union tour of Europe =

Summary
P	W	D	L
Total
2	0	0	2
Test match
2	0	0	2
Opponent
P	W	D	L
Italy
1	0	0	1
England
1	0	0	1

The 2004 Canada rugby union tour of Europe was a short series of two matches played in November 2004 in Italy and England by Canada national rugby union team.

== Results ==
6 November 2004

Italy	51–6	Canada
Try: Bergamasco, Masi 2 Ongaro 2, Travagli; Con: Wakarua 6 Pen: Wakarua 3		Pen: Barker 2

Stadio Fattori, L'Aquila
Attendance: 8,600
Referee: Lyndon Bray (New Zealand)

Italy: 15.Kaine Robertson, 14.Ludovico Nitoglia, 13.Gonzalo Canale, 12.Andrea Masi, 11.Denis Dallan, 10.Pietro Travagli, 9.Paul Griffen, 8.Silvio Orlando, 7.Mauro Bergamasco, 6.Aaron Persico, 5.Marco Bortolami (capt.), 4.Santiago Dellapè, 3.Salvatore Perugini, 2.Fabio Ongaro, 1.Andrea Lo Cicero, – replacements: 16.Giorgio Intoppa, 17.Salvatore Costanzo, 18.Enrico Pavanello, 19.David dal Maso, 20.Rima Wakarua, 21.Luciano Orquera, 22.Walter Pozzebon
Canada: 15.Quentin Fyffe, 14.Mike Pyke, 13.John Cannon, 12.Marco di Girolamo, 11.Stirling Richmond, 10.Jared Barker, 9.Ed Fairhurst, 8.Stan McKeen, 7.Mike Webb, 6.Jamie Cudmore (yellow card) , 5.Colin Yukes, 4.Mike Burak, 3.Garth Cooke, 2.Mark Lawson, 1.Kevin Tkachuk, – replacements: 16.Aaron Abrams, 17.Forrest Gainer, 18.Dan Pletch, 19.Josh Jackson, 20.Pat Fleck, 21.Ryan Smith, 22.Derek Daypuck

13 November 2004

England	70–0	Canada
Try: Cueto 2, Greenwood; Hodgson, Lewsey 2 Moody, Robinson 3 Tindall, Vyvyan

Twickenham, London
Attendance: 41,000
Referee: Scott Young (Australia)

England: 15.Jason Robinson (capt.), 14.Mark Cueto, 13.Henry Paul, 12.Mike Tindall, 11.Josh Lewsey, 10.Charlie Hodgson, 9.Andy Gomarsall, 8.Martin Corry, 7.Andy Hazell, 6.Lewis Moody, 5.Steve Borthwick, 4.Danny Grewcock, 3.Julian White, 2.Steve Thompson, 1.Graham Rowntree, – replacements: 16.Andy Titterrell, 17.Andrew Sheridan, 18.Ben Kay, 19.Hugh Vyvyan, 20.Hall Charlton, 21.Will Greenwood, 22.Ben Cohen
Canada: 15.Derek Daypuck, 14.David Moonlight, 13.Ryan Smith, 12.Marco di Girolamo, 11.Stirling Richmond, 10.Ed Fairhurst, 9.Pat Fleck, 8.Colin Yukes, 7.Stan McKeen, 6.Jamie Cudmore, 5.Mike Burak, 4.Josh Jackson, 3.Forrest Gainer, 2.Aaron Abrams, 1.Kevin Tkachuk (capt.), – replacements: 16.Mark Lawson, 17.Garth Cooke, 18.Dan Pletch, 19.Christoph Strubin, 20.Dave Spicer, 21.John Cannon, 22.Sean O'Leary
