= 2002 Canada rugby union tour of Europe =

Summary
P	W	D	L
Total
2	0	0	2
Test match
2	0	0	2
Opponent
P	W	D	L
Wales
1	0	0	1
France
1	0	0	1

The 2002 Canada rugby union tour of Europe was a series of matches played in November 2002 in Wales and France by Canada national rugby union team.

== Results ==
16 November 2002

Wales	32–21	Canada
Try: McBryde, Robinson; Con: S.Jones 2 Pen: S.Jones 6		Pen: Barker 6 Drop: Williams

Millennium Stadium, Cardiff
Attendance: 31,000
Referee: Giulio De Santis (Italy)

Wales: 15. Rhys Williams, 14. Mark Jones, 13. Jamie Robinson, 12. Sonny Parker, 11. Gareth Thomas, 10. Stephen Jones, 9. Dwayne Peel, 8. Colin Charvis (c), 7. Martyn Williams, 6. Dafydd Jones, 5. Gareth Llewellyn, 4. Vernon Cooper, 3. Ben Evans, 2. Robin McBryde, 1. Iestyn Thomas, – Replacements: Michael Owen, Scott Quinnell, Ryan Powell, Iestyn Harris, Dafydd James – Unused: 16. Mefin Davies, 17. Gethin Jenkins
Canada: 15. Winston Stanley, 14. Sean Fauth, 13. Nik Witkowski, 12.John Cannon, 11. Fred Asselin, 10. Jared Barker, 9. Morgan Williams, 8. Phil Murphy, 7. Adam van Staveren, 6. Ryan Banks, 5. Mike James, 4. John Tait, 3. Jon Thiel, 2. Pat Dunkley (c), 1. Rod Snow, – Replacements: 17. Kevin Tkachuk, 18. Jamie Cudmore, 19. Leif Carlson, 20. Ed Fairhurst, 22. Marco di Girolamo – Unused: 16. Mark Lawson, 21. Bobby Ross

23 November 2002

France	35–3	Canada
Try: Bory, Clerc 2, Traille; Con: Merceron 2, Traille; Pen: Merceron 3		Pen: Ross

Stade de France, Paris
Attendance: 48,000
Referee: David McHugh (Ireland)

France: Nicolas Brusque, Vincent Clerc, Thomas Castaignède, Damien Traille, David Bory, Gérald Merceron, Fabien Galthié (c), Imanol Harinordoquy, Olivier Magne, Serge Betsen, Olivier Brouzet, Fabien Pelous, Pieter de Villiers, Raphaël Ibañez, Jean-Jacques Crenca, – Replacements: Sylvain Marconnet, Jean-Baptiste Rué, David Auradou, Sébastien Chabal, Dimitri Yachvili, François Gelez, Xavier Garbajosa
Canada: 15. Winston Stanley, 14. Sean Fauth, 13. Nik Witkowski, 12.John Cannon, 11. Fred Asselin, 10. Bobby Ross, 9. Morgan Williams, 8. Phil Murphy, 7. Ryan Banks, 6. Alan Charron (c), 5. Mike James, 4. John Tait, 3. Jon Thiel, 2. Pat Dunkley, 1. Rod Snow, – Replacements: 16. Mark Lawson, 17. Kevin Tkachuk, 18. Jamie Cudmore, 19. Adam van Staveren, 20. Ed Fairhurst, 22. Marco di Girolamo – Unused: 21. Jared Barker
