= 2005 end-of-year rugby union internationals =

Several international rugby union matches

The 2005 end of year tests, also known as the 2005 Autumn Internationals, refers to several international rugby union matches that took place during November/December period between touring teams from the southern hemisphere – Australia, Argentina, New Zealand and South Africa – and one or more teams from the Six Nations Championship: England, France, Ireland, Italy, Scotland and Wales. South Pacific team also tour the northern hemisphere as well as tier 2 European sides.

Wales had the main headline during the tests after beating Australia 24-22, their first victory over Australia since the third place match in the 1987 Rugby World Cup.

New Zealand completed a grand slam tour, their first since 1978.

== Week 1 ==
5 November 2005
16:00 GMT

Wales	3–41	New Zealand
Pen: S. Jones	Report	Try: Carter (2); Gear (3); Con: Carter (5/5); Pen: Carter (2)

Millennium Stadium, Cardiff
Attendance: 74,402
Referee: Chris White (England)

5 November 2005
21:00 CET/GMT+01 (UTC+01)

France	26–16	Australia
Try: Heymans; Martin; Con: Élissalde (2/2); Pen: Élissalde (3); Michalak (1)	Report	Try: Mitchell; Con: Rogers; Pen: Rogers (3)

Stade Vélodrome, Marseille
Attendance: 60,000
Referee: Paul Honiss (New Zealand)

5 November 2005
17:10 AST (UTC-3)

Argentina	23–34	South Africa
Try: M. Contepomi; Durand; Leonelli; Con: F. Contepomi (1/3); Pen: F. Contepomi (2)	Report	Try: Fourie; Montgomery; Smith; Con: Montgomery (2/3); Pen: Montgomery (3); Pretorius; Drop: Conradie

Estadio José Amalfitani, Buenos Aires
Attendance: 40,000
Referee: Paul Honiss (England)

== Week 2 ==
11 November 2005
19:30 GMT

Wales	11–10	Fiji
Try: Owen; Pen: N. Robinson; Drop: N. Robinson	Report	Try: Rawaqa; Con: Vulakoro; Drop: Baikeinuku

Millennium Stadium, Cardiff
Attendance: 73,045
Referee: Rob Dickson (Scotland)

12 November 2005
15:00 CET/GMT+01 (UTC+01)

Italy	48–0	Tonga
Try: Mi. Bergamasco (2); Bortolami (2); Canale; Sole (2); Con: Pez (5/7); Pen: Pez	Report

Stadio Lungobisenzio, Prato
Attendance: 7,000
Referee: Matt Goddard (Australia)

12 November 2005
14:30 GMT

England	26–16	Australia
Try: Cohen; Cueto; Con: Hodgson; Barkley; Pen: Hodgson (2); Barkley; Drop: Hodgson	Report	Try: Mitchell; Con: Rogers; Pen: Rogers (3)

Twickenham, London
Attendance: 62,000
Referee: Joël Jutge (France)

12 November 2005
14:30 GMT

Ireland	7–45	New Zealand
Try: Horan; Con: Humphreys	Report	Try: Howlett (2); Sivivatu (2); Weepu; Con: Evans (4/5); Pen: Evans (4)

Lansdowne Road, Dublin
Attendance: 42,000
Referee: Jonathan Kaplan (South Africa)

12 November 2005
14:30 GMT

Scotland	19–23	Argentina
Try: Parks; Con: Paterson; Pen: Paterson (3); Drop: Paterson	Report	Try: Leonelli; Penalty try Con: Todeschini (2/2); Pen: Todeschini (3)

Murrayfield Stadium, Edinburgh
Attendance: 20,000
Referee: Kelvin Deaker (New Zealand)

12 November 2005
17:00 CET/GMT+01 (UTC+01)

France	50–6	Canada
Try: Bonnaire (2); Bruno; Castaignède; Marty; Michalak; Mignoni; Con: Michalak; Yachvili (2); Pen: Michalak; Yachvili (2)	Report	Pen: Daypuck (2)

Stade Marcel Saupin, Nantes
Attendance: 35,702
Referee: Bryce Lawrence (New Zealand)

== Week 3 ==
19 November 2005
14:00 EET (UTC+2)

Romania	22–20	Canada
	Report

Stadionul Ghencea, Bucharest
Referee: Didier Mene (France)

19 November 2005
15:00 CET (UTC+1)

France	43–8	Tonga
	Report

Stade de Toulouse, Toulouse
Attendance: 25,000
Referee: Rob Dickson (Scotland)

19 November 2005
15:00 CET (UTC+1)

Italy	22–39	Argentina
	Report

Stadio Luigi Ferraris, Genoa
Attendance: 22,000
Referee: Nigel Whitehouse (Wales)

19 November 2005
14:30 GMT

England	19–23	New Zealand
Try: Corry; Con: Hodgson; Pen: Hodgson (4)	Report	Try: Mealamu; Umaga; Con: Carter (2/2); Pen: Carter (3)

Twickenham, London
Attendance: 62,000
Referee: Alan Lewis (Ireland)

19 November 2005
14:30 GMT

Ireland	14–30	Australia
Try: Horgan; Con: Humphreys; Pen: Humphreys; O'Gara (2)	Report	Try: Mitchell (2); Latham; Con: Rogers (3/3); Pen: Rogers (3)

Lansdowne Road, Dublin
Attendance: 42,000
Referee: Chris White (England)

19 November 2005
15:00 GMT

Portugal	17–26	Fiji
	Report

Universitario Lisboa, Lisbon
Referee: Scott Young (Australia)

19 November 2005
15:00 GMT

Scotland	18–11	Samoa
	Report

Murrayfield Stadium, Edinburgh
Attendance: 14,718
Referee: Alain Rolland (Ireland)

19 November 2005
17:00 GMT

Wales	16–33	South Africa
Try: Sweeney; Con: S. Jones; Pen: S. Jones (3)	Report	Try: Habana (2); Jantjes; Rossouw; Con: Bosman (2/4); Pen: Bosman (3)

Millennium Stadium, Cardiff
Attendance: 42,000
Referee: Stuart Dickinson (Australia)

== Week 4 ==
26 November 2005
12:30 GMT

Ireland	43–12	Romania
	Report

Lansdowne Road, Dublin
Attendance: 25,000
Referee: Andrew Cole (Australia)

26 November 2005
15:00 CET (UTC+1)

Italy	23–8	Fiji
	Report

Stadio Brianteo, Monza
Attendance: 12,000
Referee: Tappe Henning (South Africa)

26 November 2005
14:30 GMT

Scotland	10–29	New Zealand
Try: Webster; Con: Paterson; Pen: Paterson	Report	Try: Evans; Gear (2); Lauaki; Con: Evans (2/3); MacDonald; Pen: Evans

Murrayfield Stadium, Edinburgh
Attendance: 48,000
Referee: Nigel Whitehouse (Wales)

26 November 2005
14:30 GMT

England	40–3	Samoa
	Report

Twickenham, London
Attendance: 62,000
Referee: Mark Lawrence (South Africa)

26 November 2005
17:00 GMT

Wales	24–22	Australia
Try: S. Williams; Penalty try Con: S. Jones; Pen: S. Jones (4)	Report	Try: Tuqiri; Sharpe (2); Latham; Con: Rogers (2/3); Pen: Rogers

Millennium Stadium, Cardiff
Attendance: 74,721
Referee: Tony Spreadbury (England)

26 November 2005
21:00 CET (UTC+1)

France	26–20	South Africa
Try: Michalak; Rougerie; Szarzewski; Con: Élissalde; Pen: Élissalde (2); Michalak	Report	Try: Botha; Fourie; Con: Montgomery (2/2); Pen: Montgomery; Bosman

Stade de France, Saint Denis
Attendance: 80,000
Referee: Scott Young (Australia)

== Week 5 ==
3 December 2005
17:00 AST (UTC-3)

Argentina	12–28	Samoa
	Report

Cricket and Rugby Club Field, Buenos Aires
Attendance: 25,000
Referee: Nigel Owens (Wales)

== See also ==
- End of year rugby union tests
- Mid-year rugby union tests
- 2005 South Africa rugby union tour of Argentina and Europe
- 2005 New Zealand rugby union tour of Britain and Ireland
- 2005 Australia rugby union tour of Europe
- 2005 Argentina rugby union tour of Scotland and Italy
- 2005 Tonga rugby union tour of Italy and France
- 2005 Canada rugby union tour of France and Romania
- 2005 Fiji rugby union tour of Europe
- 2005 Samoa rugby union tour of Britain and Argentina
