= 2005 Tonga rugby union tour of Italy and France =

Summary
P	W	D	L
Total
4	1	0	3
Test match
2	0	0	2
Opponent
P	W	D	L
Italy
1	0	0	1
France
1	0	0	1

The 2005 Tonga rugby union tour of Italy and France was a series of rugby union matches played in November 2005 in Italy and France by Tonga national rugby union team.

It was a tour with heavy losses, with only a victory in the opening match with the Italian second team.

== Results ==
8 November 2005

Italy A	27–33	Tonga XV

Stadio Picchi, Livorno

12 November 2005

Italy	48–0	Tonga
Try: Bergamasco 2, Pozzebon 2 Canale, Sole 2 Con: Pez 5 Pen: Pez

Stadio Lungobisenzio, Prato
Attendance: 7,000
Referee: Matt Goddard (Australia)

Italy: 15. Ezio Galon, 14. Mirco Bergamasco, 13. Gonzalo Canale, 12. Cristian Stoica, 11. Ludovico Nitoglia, 10. Ramiro Pez, 9. Paul Griffen, 8. Josh Sole, 7. Aaron Persico, 6. Fabio Ongaro, 5. Alessandro Zanni (c), 4. Carlo Del Fava, 3. Walter Pozzebon, 2. Carlo Festuccia, 1. Andrea Lo Cicero, – Replacements: 16. Matías Agüero, 17. Sergio Parisse, 18. Valerio Bernabò, 19. Marco Bortolami, 20. Luciano Orquera, 21. Tommaso Visentin, 22. Pablo Canavosio
Tonga: 15. Sila Vaʻenuku, 14. Suka Hufanga, 13. Sione Tuʻipulotu, 12. Rodney Mahe, 11. Salesi Finau, 10. Fangatapu Apikotoa, 9. Soane Havea, 8. Chris Halaʻufia, 7. Viliami Vaki (c), 6. Maama Molitika, 5. Milton Ngauamo, 4. Inoke Afeaki, 3. Tonga Leaʻaetoa, 2. Ephraim Taukafa, 1. Soane Tongaʻuiha, – Replacements: 16. Vili Maʻasi, 17. Peni Fakalelu, 18. Fakataha Molitika, 19. Ueleni Fono, 21. Sikuti Vunipola, 22. Keni Fisilau – Unused: 20. Sioeli Nau

19 November 2005

France	43–8	Tonga
Try: Clerc 2, Jauzion; Lièvremont, Rougerie; Con: Yachvili 3 Pen: Yachvili 4		Try: Vaki; Drop: Tuipulotu

Stadium Municipal, Toulouse
Attendance: 25,000
Referee: Robert Dickson (Scotland)

France: 15. Julien Laharrague, 14. Aurélien Rougerie, 13. David Marty, 12. Thomas Castaignède, 11. Vincent Clerc, 10. Yann Delaigue, 9. Dimitri Yachvili, 8. Sébastien Chabal, 7. Julien Bonnaire, 6. Yannick Nyanga, 5. Jérôme Thion (c), 4. Gregory Lamboley, 3. Sylvain Marconnet, 2. Raphaël Ibañez, 1. Olivier Milloud, – Replacements: 16. Sébastien Bruno, 17. Pieter de Villiers, 18. Lionel Nallet, 20. Thomas Lièvremont, 21. Frédéric Michalak, 22. Yannick Jauzion – Unused: 19. Rémy Martin
Tonga: 15. Sione Tuʻipulotu, 14. Pila Fifita, 13. Suka Hufanga, 12. Andrew Mailei, 11. Salesi Finau, 10. Elisi Vunipola, 9. Sioeli Nau, 8. Chris Halaʻufia, 7. Rodney Mahe, 6. Viliami Vaki (c), 5. Milton Ngauamo, 4. Fakataha Molitika, 3. Tonga Leaʻaetoa, 2. Ephraim Taukafa, 1. Soane Tongaʻuiha, – Replacements: 16. Vili Maʻasi, 17. Alani Maka, 18. Talite Vaioleti, 19. Ueleni Fono, 20. Soane Havea, 21. Fangatapu Apikotoa, 22. Epi Taione

26 November 2005

France A	39–19	Tonga XV

Stade de la Mosson, Montpellier
