= Naufahu =

Naufahu is both a given name and surname. Notable people with the name include:

- Naufahu Tahi (born 1981), American football player
- Joe Naufahu (born 1978), New Zealand rugby union player
- Nisifolo Naufahu (born 1977), Tongan rugby union player
- Rene Naufahu (born 1970), New Zealand actor
