= Josh Jackson =

Josh Jackson may refer to:

- Josh Jackson or Joshua Jackson (born 1978), American-Canadian actor
- Josh Jackson (basketball) (born 1997), American basketball player
- Josh Jackson (quarterback) (born 1998), American football quarterback
- Josh Jackson (cornerback) (born 1996), American football cornerback
- Josh Jackson (rugby league) (born 1991), Australian rugby league player
- Josh Jackson (rugby union) (born 1980), Canadian rugby union player
