= 2005 Argentina rugby union tour of Scotland and Italy =

Summary
P	W	D	L
Total
2	2	0	0
Test match
2	2	0	0
Opponent
P	W	D	L
Scotland
1	1	0	0
Italy
1	1	0	0

The 2005 Argentina rugby union tour of Scotland and Italy was a series of matches played in November 2005 in Scotland and Italy by Argentina national rugby union team. The "Pumas" won both the matches.

After the victory with Scotland, Argentina beat also Italy after a first half where Italy was very close in the results.

== Results ==
12 November 2005

Scotland	19–23	Argentina
Try: Parks; Con: Paterson; Pen: Paterson 3 Drop: Parks		Try: Leonelli, Morelli penalty try Con: Todeschini 2 Pen: Todeschini 3

Murrayfield, Edinburgh
Attendance: 20,000
Referee: Kelvin Deaker (New Zealand)

Scotland: 15. Chris Paterson, 14. Rory Lamont, 13. Marcus Di Rollo, 12. Andrew Henderson, 11. Sean Lamont, 10. Dan Parks, 9. Mike Blair, 8. Simon Taylor (yellow card) , 7. Ally Hogg, 6. Jason White (c), 5. Scott Murray, 4. Craig Hamilton, 3. Bruce Douglas, 2. Dougie Hall, 1. Gavin Kerr – Replacements: 16. Scott Lawson, 17. Craig Smith, 18. Allan Jacobsen, 19. Alastair Kellock, 21. Chris Cusiter, 22. Hugo Southwell – Unused: 20. Kelly Brown
Argentina: 15. Juan Martín Hernández, 14. Federico Martín Aramburú, 13. Manuel Contepomi, 12. Felipe Contepomi, 11. Francisco Leonelli, 10. Federico Todeschini, 9. Agustín Pichot (c), 8. Juan Martín Fernández Lobbe, 7. Martín Schusterman, 6. Martín Durand, 5. Pablo Bouza, 4. Ignacio Fernández Lobbe, 3. Omar Hasan, 2. Mario Ledesma, 1. Rodrigo Roncero – Replacements: 17. Martín Scelzo, 18. Manuel Carizza, 19. Juan Manuel Leguizamón, 21. Lucas Borges, 22. Bernardo Stortoni – Unused: 16. Eusebio Guiñazú, 20. Nicolás Fernández Miranda

19 November 2005

Italy	22–39	Argentina
Try: Canale; Con: Pez; Pen: Pez 5		Try: Aramburú, Leonelli Morey; Stortoni, Tiesi; Con: Contepomi 2 Pen: Contepomi 5

Stadio Luigi Ferraris, Genoa
Attendance: 22,000
Referee: Nigel Whitehouse (Wales)

Italy: 15. Ezio Galon, 14. Mirco Bergamasco, 13. Gonzalo Canale, 12. Cristian Stoica, 11. Ludovico Nitoglia, 10. Ramiro Pez, 9. Paul Griffen, 8. Josh Sole, 7. Aaron Persico, 6. Sergio Parisse, 5. Marco Bortolami (c), 4. Carlo Del Fava, 3. Carlos Nieto, 2. Carlo Festuccia, 1. Andrea Lo Cicero – Replacements: 16. Fabio Ongaro, 17. Matías Agüero, 18. Martin Castrogiovanni, 19. Mauro Bergamasco, 20. Alessandro Zanni (yellow card) – Unused: 21. Pablo Canavosio, 22. Luciano Orquera
Argentina: 15. Bernardo Stortoni, 14. Federico Martín Aramburú, 13. Gonzalo Tiesi, 12. Felipe Contepomi, 11. Francisco Leonelli (yellow card) , 10. Juan Martín Hernández, 9. Agustín Pichot (c), 8. Juan Martín Fernández Lobbe, 7. Santiago Sanz, 6. Martín Durand, 5. Pablo Bouza, 4. Ignacio Fernández Lobbe, 3. Omar Hasan, 2. Mario Ledesma, 1. Rodrigo Roncero – Replacements: 16. Eusebio Guiñazú, 17. Martín Scelzo, 18. Manuel Carizza, 19. Juan Manuel Leguizamón, 20. Nicolás Fernández Miranda – Unused: 21. Federico Todeschini, 22. Lucas Borges
