= Taunaholo Taufahema =

Tonga international rugby union player

- Born: 23 December 1969 (age 56) Navutoka, Tongatapu, Tonga
- Height: 5 ft 10 in (178 cm)
- Weight: 186 lb (84 kg)

Rugby union career
- Position: Wing
International career
Years	Team	Apps	(Points)
1998–2001	Tonga	17	(41)

Taunaholo Taufahema (born 23 December 1969) is a Tongan former rugby union international.

Born in Navutoka, Taufahema was a winger and represented Tonga in 17 Test matches. He played at the 1999 Rugby World Cup and scored Tonga's opening try in the win over Italy at Welford Road Stadium.

Taufahema played provincial rugby in New Zealand for Auckland and also competed for Welsh club Caerphilly.

== See also ==
- List of Tonga national rugby union players
