= Fred Asselin =

Canada international rugby union player

- Full name: Frédérick Carl Asselin
- Born: October 31, 1973 (age 53) Montreal, Canada
- Height: 5 ft 11 in (180 cm)
- Weight: 175 lb (79 kg)
- Notable relative: Nadine Rolland (wife)

Rugby union career
- Position: Winger
International career
Years	Team	Apps	(Points)
1999–02	Canada	15	(15)

Frédérick Carl Asselin (born October 31, 1973) is a Canadian former international rugby union player.

== Rugby career ==
Born in Montreal, Asselin was a British Columbia-based winger whose pace made him well suited to the rugby sevens format. He scored 63 tries for Canada in World Sevens Series events and featured twice at the Commonwealth Games, including in 1998 when he scored three tries in the quarter-final loss to Fiji. In 2001, Asselin had a season in New Zealand rugby, playing with Northland. He made 15 capped appearances for the Canada XV.

== Personal life ==
Asselin is married to former Olympic swimmer Nadine Rolland.

== See also ==
- List of Canada national rugby union players
