= David Clark (rugby union) =

Australian rugby union footballer and coach

David Clark (born Toowoomba, 18 February 1940) is a former Australian rugby union footballer and a current coach.

Clark played for GPS Old Boys, from 1957 to 1976, and 27 times for Queensland. He was director of coaching of Queensland, from 1978 to 1988. He was twice called for Australia in 1962 and 1963, but was never capped. He was appointed as the first Queensland Director of Coaching in 1976 until 1987

In 1988 to 1996 he was Head Coach of Rugby at the Australian Institute for Sport in Canberra, before moving to Canada. He moved there in 1996 to lead the Commonwealth Centre for Sports Development (PacificSport) rugby programme in Victoria, British Columbia.

Clark was nominated the first professional head coach of Canada, after the 1999 Rugby World Cup finals. He was controversially sacked on 1 August 2001, but his players launched a strike that eventually reinstated him as head coach of Canada, in November 2001. Clark, at the 2003 Rugby World Cup finals, achieved a 24–7 win over Tonga, as their only triumph at the world Cup. Canada had previously beaten Tonga, Scotland, Italy, and drew with Ireland during his reign, and moved from 14th in the World rankings to 11th when he departed in 2004.

Sporting positions
Preceded by (Republic of Ireland) Pat Parfrey	Canada National Rugby Union Coach; 2000–2003	Succeeded by (Canada) Ric Suggitt
