= Heamani Lavaka =

Tongan rugby union player (1969–2024)

- Born: 10 January 1969 Tonga
- Died: 22 April 2024 (aged 55) Australia
- Height: 5 ft 11 in (1.80 m)
- Weight: 252 lb (114 kg)

Rugby union career
- Position: Prop
Senior career
Years	Team	Apps	(Points)
20??-2007	Eastern Suburbs	105	(15)
2007-2008	Melbourne Rebels		
International career
Years	Team	Apps	(Points)
1996–2003	Tonga	15	(0)

Heamani Lavaka (10 January 1969 – 22 April 2024) was a Tongan rugby union player who played as prop.

== Career ==
Lavaka was first capped for Tonga during the match against Samoa in Apia, on 13 July 1996. He was also part of the 2003 Rugby World Cup roster coached by Jim Love, playing four matches in the tournament, with the match against Canada in Wollongong on 29 October 2003 being his last international test cap. At club level, Lavaka played the Australian Rugby Championship for Melbourne Rebels in the 2007–08 season.

== Illness and death ==
Lavaka was hospitalised in Sydney, Australia in March 2024 due to internal bleeding and subsequently underwent a number of surgeries. He died on 22 April, at the age of 55.
