= Ueleni Fono =

Tongan rugby player

- Born: Ueleni Fono; 6 May 1982 (age 44) Holopeka, Tonga
- Height: 1.96 m (6 ft 5 in)
- Weight: 113 kg (249 lb; 17 st 11 lb)

Rugby union career
- Position(s): Openside flanker and eighthman
Senior career
Years	Team	Apps	(Points)
2006-2008	Stade Aurillacois	12	(54)
2008-2013	SU Agen	89	(40)
2013-16	Biarritz	24	(5)
2016-18	Blagnac SCR	28	(5)
International career
Years	Team	Apps	(Points)
2005-	Tonga	4	(0)

Ueleni Fono (born May 6, 1982) is a Tongan rugby player who plays as an openside flanker and as an eighthman for French club Blagnac SCR. He played for Stade Aurillacois Cantal Auvergne from 2006 to 2008.

In July 2013 he moved to Biarritz. In February 2016 he suffered a hamstring injury, forcing him to miss several games.

In October 2016 he announced that he was ending his professional career with Biarritz and was instead joining Blagnac SCR.
