= Viliami Maʻasi =

Tongan rugby union player (born 1975)

Viliami Ma'asi
- Born: 31 July 1975 (age 51) Tonga
- Height: 184 cm (6 ft 0 in)
- Weight: 105 kg (16 st 7 lb)

Rugby union career
- Position: Hooker
Senior career
| Years | Team | Apps | (Points) |
| 2001-2007 | Cornish Pirates | | |
| 2007-2010 | Leeds Carnegie | | |
| 2010-2012 | London Welsh | | |
| 2012-2016 | Ampthill | | |
International career
| Years | Team | Apps | (Points) |
| 1997–2009 | Tonga | 36 | (15) |

Viliami Maʻasi (born 31 July 1975) is a Tongan former Rugby Union international player. He represented Tonga at the 2003 Rugby World Cup.

== Early life ==
The fourth of seven boys, Ma'asi grew up just outside the Tongan capital of Nuku’alofa. He trained as a health officer on the main island, and was posted in Neiafu. He moved to England to play rugby union in 2001 and signed for Cornish Pirates.

== Playing career ==
He won 36 caps for Tonga and played at the 2003 Rugby World Cup. He played as a hooker, and played club rugby in Britain for Cornish Pirates until 2007 when he signed for Leeds Carnegie. He also played for London Welsh prior to his release in 2012. He was laterly club captain at Ampthill, before retiring aged 41 years-old in 2016, after making 195 appearances in total in English league rugby.

== Coaching career ==
In 2017, he began coaching the Peterborough Lions. With the club he won promotion from Regional 1 Midlands to National League 2 North in 2018. For the 2024/2025 season he was appointed as the head coach of Oundle RFC.

== Personal life ==
His son Rekeiti Ma'asi-White plays for Sale Sharks in the Rugby Premiership. Another son, Samson, captained England at U18 level, but had to give up the game for health reasons and required a kidney transplant from his father.
