= Gus Leger =

Tongan rugby union player (b. 1974)

- Born: Augustine Joseph Leger; 12 October 1974 (age 52) Tokoroa, New Zealand
- Height: 5 ft 11 in (1.80 m)
- Weight: 220 lb (100 kg)
- School: Avondale College

Rugby union career
- Position: Centre
Amateur team(s)
Years	Team	Apps	(Points)
1995	Manurewa		
–	Pukekohe		
Provincial / State sides
Years	Team	Apps	(Points)
1997	East Coast	29	(40)
1999-2002	Counties Manukau	10	(15)
International career
Years	Team	Apps	(Points)
2001–2003	Tonga	15	(0)

Augustine Joseph Leger (born 12 October 1974 in Tokoroa) is a New-Zealand born Tongan rugby union player. He played as centre.

== Career ==
=== Club career ===
Leger first played rugby union with the Avondale College team from Auckland, and he played for the New Zealand national under-17 rugby union team, where he played alongside Jonah Lomu and Taine Randell. During his stay in the United States, he played baseball for three years. Leger later returned to New Zealand, to play softball and become a New Zealand, then a Samoan international. He also played rugby union with East Coast and with Counties Manukau in the National Provincial Championship.

=== International career ===
Leger was first capped for Tonga during a match against Scotland, on 10 November 2001, at Murrayfield. He was also part of the Tongan roster for the 2003 Rugby World Cup, playing three matches in the tournament, with his last test cap being against Canada, on 29 October 2003, in Wollongong.

In 2023 he was appointed head coach of Moana Pasifika.
