= Mike French (rugby union) =

United States rugby union player

- Born: 19 November 1975 (age 50) Anchorage, Alaska
- Height: 191 cm (6 ft 3 in)
- Weight: 114 kg (251 lb; 17 st 13 lb)
- University: Cal Poly- SLO

Rugby union career
- Position: Prop
- Correct as of 5 May 2021
International career
Years	Team	Apps	(Points)
2005–2007	United States	8	(0)
- Correct as of 5 May 2021

Mike French (born 19 November 1975 in the United States) was a United States rugby union player. His playing position was prop. He was selected as a reserve for the United States at the 2007 Rugby World Cup, but did not make an appearance. He though made 8 appearances for the United States national team in other matches. Mike French was also a college wrestler for Caly Poly where he was a 4X NCAA Qualifier and 4x Pac-10 Conference placer (1st,3rd, 3rd,4th).
