= Francesco Mazzariol =

Italy international rugby union player

- Born: Francesco Mazzariol; 1 March 1975 (age 51) Treviso, Italy
- Height: 5 ft 8 in (1.73 m)
- Weight: 167 lb (76 kg)

Rugby union career
- Position: Flyhalf / Centre
Senior career
Years	Team	Apps	(Points)
1993-03	Treviso	180	(765)
International career
Years	Team	Apps	(Points)
1995-2004	Italy	33	(81)

Francesco "Coco" Mazzariol (born 1 March 1975 in Treviso) is an Italian former rugby union footballer and a current coach. He played firstly as a scrum-half, and later in his career (with more success) at fly half.

== Career ==
Mazzariol first played at Benetton Treviso, where he became a professional for the season of 1995/96. He would play for his home team until 2002/03, then moving to Gran Parma Rugby, where he played until 2009/10, when he finished his career. The Italian fly half then signed for Rugby Parma F.C. at 2005/06, where he still plays. Mazzariol played in the 2006 Heineken Cup play-off game against the Dragons kicking 11 vital points in a 24-16 victory.

He won for Benetton Rugby Treviso 5 titles of the Italian Championship, in 1996/97, 1997/98, 1998/99, 2000/01 and 2002/03, and the Cup of Italy, in 1998. He won for Rugby Parma F.C. the Cup of Italy, in 2007 and 2008.

Mazzariol holds 33 caps for Italy, from 1995 to 2004, having scored 2 tries, 13 conversions and 15 penalties, 81 points in aggregate. He did not have more caps mostly due to the strong opposition from Alessandro Troncon.

He was a member of the Italian Squad at the 1995 Rugby World Cup finals, but his first match was only at 14 October 1995, in a 34-22 loss to France. He played at both the 1999 Rugby World Cup finals and the 2003 Rugby World Cup finals. His only presence at Six Nations was in 2002. Mazzariol greatest international success was the win at European Nations Cup in 1997.

He is the coach of Gran Parma Rugby since 2010/11.
