= Sililo Martens =

Tonga international rugby union player (born 1977)

- Born: Sililo Martens; 1977 (age 48–49) New Zealand
- Height: 1.80 m (5 ft 11 in)
- Weight: 97 kg (15 st 4 lb)

Rugby union career
- Position: Scrum-half
Senior career
Years	Team	Apps	(Points)
1999-2000	Worcester	6	(5)
2000-2002	Swansea	47	(40)
2002-2003	Bridgend	20	(5)
2003-2004	Celtic Warriors	15	(10)
2004-2008	Sale	66	(35)
2008-2009	Scarlets	12	(0)
2009-2011	Carmarthen Quins	32	(10)
International career
Years	Team	Apps	(Points)
1998-2009	Tonga	29	(15)
2008	Pacific Islanders	3	(0)

Sililo Victor Martens (born 1977 in Auckland, New Zealand) is a former Tongan international rugby union player.

== Career ==
Martens was born in Auckland, New Zealand. He spent most of his early childhood in Tonga, but moved back to NZ to start his education. He went on to play rugby for Auckland and continued through the grades to reach New Zealand Schools status, NZ 19.s. In 1999 he played for Tonga in the Rugby World Cup which led to a professional rugby contract with English premiership side Worcester. From 2000 to 2002 he played for Swansea in the Welsh Premiership. 2002 -2003 he joined fellow Welsh team Bridgend. During the 2003/2004 Martens joined the short lived Welsh regional side Celtic Warriors. He played is his second Rugby World Cup in 2003 for Tonga. 2004-2008 moved back to the English Premiership with Sale Sharks who went on to win the Guinness Premiership in 2006, to which Martens contributed 15 appearances. In 2008 he played in the Pacific Islands Team which toured the UK. The 2008/2009 season saw Martens return to Welsh rugby joining the Scarlets.

Martens retired at the early age of 34. His previous clubs include Worcester, Swansea, Bridgend, Celtic Warriors, Sale Sharks and the Scarlets.

Martens acted in the Welsh language soap opera Pobl y Cwm and went on to play a small role in the film Invictus along with fellow Tongan Epeli Taione. Sililo also played a large role in Da Vinci's Demons (2013).
