= David Palu =

Tonga international rugby union player

- Born: Tevita Silifou Palu; 6 September 1981 (age 45) Auckland, New Zealand
- Height: 5 ft 8.9 in (1.75 m)
- Weight: 14 st 2.4 lb (90.0 kg)

Rugby union career
- Position: Fly-half
Senior career
Years	Team	Apps	(Points)
- RC Timişoara
International career
Years	Team	Apps	(Points)
- Tonga

Tevita Silifou "David" Palu (born 6 September 1981 in Auckland, New Zealand) is a New Zealand rugby union footballer. He plays the position of fly-half and is currently playing for RC Timişoara in the Romanian Rugby Championship.
