= Dave Lougheed =

Canada international rugby union player

- Born: David Cameron Lougheed; April 11, 1968 (age 58) Toronto, Ontario, Canada
- Height: 1.88 m (6 ft 2 in)
- Weight: 91 kg (201 lb; 14.3 st)

Rugby union career
- Position(s): Centre, Wing
Senior career
Years	Team	Apps	(Points)
1990-1995	Toronto Welsh		
1996-1998	Balmy Beach		
1998–2000	Leicester Tigers	35	(90)
2000	Gloucester	2	(0)
International career
Years	Team	Apps	(Points)
1990-2003	Canada	34	(35)

David Cameron Lougheed (born April 11, 1968) is a Canadian former rugby union footballer, playing at wing and centre. He was considered large for a winger, being 1.88m tall and weighing 91 kg though his quick feet and amazing hands made up any imbalances.

Born in Toronto, Ontario, Lougheed was educated at Queen's University, Canada, starting his career playing at Toronto Welsh and then Balmy Beach.

In 1990, Lougheed made his debut for Canada against Argentina and went on to gain 34 caps. Despite retiring from the international game after the 1999 World Cup, he returned to play in the 2003 World Cup.

In 1998, Lougheed signed for Leicester Tigers, playing his debut against Harlequins. In 2000 he announced his retirement, however shortly afterwards signed a one-week contract with injury stricken Gloucester.

Lougheed now lives in Calgary, Alberta and coaches the 2006 Western Canadian University Rugby Champions, the University of Calgary Dinos Rugby team.
