= John Payne (rugby union, born 1980) =

Tonga international rugby union player

- Born: 1 February 1980 (age 46) Manly, New South Wales
- Height: 6 ft 1 in (1.85 m)
- Weight: 217 lb (98 kg)

Rugby union career
- Position: Centre
Senior career
Years	Team	Apps	(Points)
2002–2003	Manly		
2004–05	Sale Sharks	5	(0)
2005–2007	Racing Metro 92	33	(15)
2007–2008	Blagnac SCR	15	(10)
International career
Years	Team	Apps	(Points)
2002–2003	Tonga	11	(5)

John Payne was born on the 1 February 1980 in Manly. He is an Australian-born Tongan former rugby union player. He played as a centre.

== Career ==
Payne was first capped for the Tonga national team on 30 November 2002, during the match against Papua New Guinea's team in Port Moresby. He was also part of the 2003 Rugby World Cup Tonga squad, playing four matches and scoring a try in the tournament, with his last test cap being during the pool stage against the Canadian team in Wollongong on 29 October 2003. At club level, Payne played for Manly RUFC, Sale Sharks, Racing Metro 92 and Blagnac SCR.
