= Jeff Reid =

Canada international rugby union player

- Born: August 15, 1979 (age 47) Sydney, Australia
- Height: 6 ft 5 in (196 cm)
- Weight: 253 lb (115 kg)
- School: Barker College

Rugby union career
- Position: Flanker / No. 8
International career
Years	Team	Apps	(Points)
2003	Canada	5	(0)

Jeff Reid (born August 15, 1974) is an Australian-born Canadian former international rugby union player.

Reid was born in Sydney and educated at Barker College.

A number eight, Reid was a first-grade player for Eastwood, debuting in 1995. He played rugby in Canada with Wanderers in a bid to play on the Canada national team, which he qualified for through his Calgary-raised mother.

Reid gained five caps for Canada in 2003, including matches against the All Blacks and Tonga at the Rugby World Cup.

== See also ==
- List of Canada national rugby union players
