= Nadine Rolland =

Canadian swimmer (born 1975)

Personal information
- Full name: Nadine Rolland
- Nickname: Nadou
- National team: Canada
- Born: May 8, 1975 (age 51) Montreal, Quebec, Canada
- Height: 1.68 m (5 ft 6 in)
- Weight: 58 kg (128 lb)

Sport
- Sport: Swimming
- Strokes: Freestyle
- Club: Cowansville

Nadine Rolland (born May 8, 1975) is a Canadian former competitive swimmer who specialized in sprint freestyle events. She represented Canada at the 2000 Summer Olympics, and later became an official member of the Canadian squad at the 2002 Commonwealth Games in Manchester, England, following a controversy on the swimming federation's decision to forbid her from the team.

Roland competed in the women's 50-metre freestyle at the 2000 Summer Olympics in Sydney. She finished third in a FINA A-cut of 25.94 from the Canadian Olympic Trials in Winnipeg, Manitoba, but offered another chance to earn a spot for the team, after Marianne Limpert decided to pull herself out of the event. She challenged seven other swimmers in heat eight, including U.S. legend Dara Torres and Australia's overwhelming favorite Susie O'Neill. Diving in with a 0.75-second deficit, Rolland scorched the field to hold off O'Neill's teammate Sarah Ryan for a seventh seed by a slim margin in a time of 26.04. Rolland missed the semifinals by a small fraction of a second, as she placed twenty-second overall out of 74 swimmers in the prelims.
