= Jim Douglas (rugby union) =

Australian rugby union international

- Full name: James Alexander Douglas
- Born: 21 February 1939 (age 87) Sydney, Australia

Rugby union career
- Position: Wing
International career
Years	Team	Apps	(Points)
1962	Australia	3	(0)

James Alexander Douglas (born 21 February 1939) is an Australian former rugby union international.

Born in Sydney, Douglas attended Yanco Agricultural High School in the Riverina region and learnt his rugby during later studies at Hawkesbury Agricultural College, which he attended on a Rosella scholarship.

Douglas played for Melbourne RUFC after moving south to take up a food processing job. He was a Victorian representative player and made one of his state appearances against the touring All Blacks in 1962.

A speedy winger, Douglas made the Wallabies squad for the 1962 tour of New Zealand, where an injury to three-quarter Bruce Harland early in the trip opened up a Test place. He played on the wing in all three Tests.

== See also ==
- List of Australia national rugby union players
