= Stirling Richmond =

Canada international rugby union player

- Born: November 17, 1980 (age 45)
- Height: 6 ft 1 in (185 cm)
- Weight: 203 lb (92 kg)
- University: University of Otago
- Notable relative: Scott Richmond (brother)

Rugby union career
- Position: Wing
International career
Years	Team	Apps	(Points)
2004–05	Canada	8	(15)

Stirling Richmond (born November 17, 1980) is a Canadian former international rugby union player.

Richmond is a younger brother of former Blue Jays pitcher Scott Richmond and grew up in North Vancouver. He undertook tertiary studies at the University of Otago in New Zealand, which is the country of birth of his father Bob.

A winger, Richmond played a season in the Hong Kong Premiership with the DeA Tigers after graduating from university and developed his game at the Pacific Pride academy in Langford, British Columbia. He competed on the Canada national team in 2004 and 2005, gaining eight total caps, with tries in each of his first three matches.

== See also ==
- List of Canada national rugby union players
