= Matthew Guinness-King =

Canada international rugby union player

- Born: April 7, 1980 (age 46) Woodstock, ON, Canada
- Height: 6 ft 0 in (183 cm)
- Weight: 200 lb (91 kg)
- School: Upper Canada College

Rugby union career
- Position: Centre / Wing
International career
| Years | Team | Apps | (Points) |
| 2003–05 | Canada | 11 | (0) |

Matthew Guinness-King (born April 7, 1980) is a Canadian former international rugby union player.

Guinness-King, born in Woodstock, Ontario, attended Upper Canada College while growing up in Toronto.

A Balmy Beach product, Guinness-King was primarily a centre and gained 11 caps for Canada, debuting against the United States in Chicago in 2002. He made Canada's squad for the 2003 Rugby World Cup, where he played on a wing in their pool match against the All Blacks. As a rugby sevens player, Guinness-King further represented Canada at the 2005 World Cup and 2006 Commonwealth Games. He captained Cambridge University in the 2011 Varsity Match.

== See also ==
- List of Canada national rugby union players
