= Mark Lawson (rugby union) =

Canada international rugby union player

- Born: 17 March 1980 (age 46) Vancouver, British Columbia

Rugby union career
- Position: Hooker
International career
Years	Team	Apps	(Points)
2002–2006	Canada	26	(5)
- Correct as of 13 September 2019

Mark Lawson (born 17 March 1980) is a former Canadian rugby union player. He played as a hooker and represented Canada internationally from 2002 to 2006. He was included in the Canadian squad for the 2003 Rugby World Cup and played in three group stage matches.
