= Tonga Leaʻaetoa =

Tonga Lea'aetoa
- Born: Tonga Lea'aetoa; 4 March 1977 (age 49) Auckland, New Zealand
- Height: 183 cm (6 ft 0 in)
- Weight: 123 kg (19 st 5 lb)

Rugby union career
- Position: Prop
Senior career
Years	Team	Apps	(Points)
2004 – 05	Nottingham		
2005 – 06	Pau		
2006 – 09	London Irish	88	(5)
2009 – 10	Toulon		
2010 – 2013	Bayonne		
- Correct as of 4 October 2010
Super Rugby
Years	Team	Apps	(Points)
1998–1999	Waratahs		
- Correct as of 5 November 2006
International career
Years	Team	Apps	(Points)
2002 –	Tonga	21	(5)
2008	Pacific Islanders	1	
- Correct as of 4 October 2010

Tonga Lea'aetoa (born 4 March 1977 in Auckland, New Zealand) is a retired New Zealand-Tongan rugby union player who last played for Bayonne in the French Top 14. Lea'aetoa's position of choice was Tighthead prop.

Lea'aetoa's parents came from Tonga, he spent his childhood in Australia in Manly, Sydney. It was when he returned to New Zealand to attend boarding school at Auckland Grammar School that rugby union took over his sporting career at the age of 16. He started out as a centre, then played at full back and as a No 8 before ending up as a prop. The unusual shift of position was due to a change in his metabolism that saw him put on 20 kilogrammes between the ages of 17 and 18. During his time in Sydney he spent several years at the Northern Suburbs Rugby Club.

In 2003 he was named to the Tongan squad for the Rugby World Cup.

Lea'aetoa arrived in England in July 2006 with a reputation as one of the most talented and versatile prop forwards in Europe. He is one of those rare individuals that can play effectively on either side of the front row, but more often would play at Tighthead

His skill and versatility earned him 19 caps for his country to date. He was ever present for London Irish in the 2009–10 season, being the only player to play in all 31 games, a feat that saw him receive the club's 'Players' Player of the Season Award'.

In 2014 he was named to the Pacific Barbarians for their match against Tonga.

In 2015 he joined the Hunters Hill Rugby Club.
