= Forrest Gainer =

Canada international rugby union player

- Born: April 15, 1979 (age 47) Edmonton, Alberta, Canada
- Height: 1.8 m (5 ft 11 in)
- Weight: 111.8 kg (246 lb; 17 st 8 lb)

Rugby union career
- Position: Prop
International career
Years	Team	Apps	(Points)
2004-2006	Canada	16	

Forrest Gainer (born April 15, 1979) is a Canadian rugby player. He plays for Canada national rugby union team. Gainer is 180.3 cm tall (5 ft 11) and weighs 111.8 kg (247 lb).
