= Stanley Afeaki =

Tonga international rugby union player

- Born: 12 November 1978 (age 48) Lower Hutt, New Zealand
- Height: 6 ft 5 in (1.96 m)
- Weight: 102 kg (225 lb; 16 st 1 lb)

Rugby union career
- Position: Flanker
Amateur team(s)
Years	Team	Apps	(Points)
- Ponsonby
International career
Years	Team	Apps	(Points)
2002-2003	Tonga	13	(35)
National sevens team
Years	Team		Comps
2006	Tonga 7s		

Stanley Ilalio Andrew Afeaki (born 12 November 1978 in Lower Hutt) is a former New Zealand born Tongan rugby union player. He debuted for Tonga against Fiji in 2002. Afeaki made his last appearance at the 2003 Rugby World Cup in the match against New Zealand. He played sevens at the 2006 Commonwealth Games.

He is the brother of Inoke Afeaki and first cousins with Western Force lock Adam Coleman. Ben Afeaki is his second cousin. Afeaki attended St. Bernard's College.
