= Nisifolo Naufahu =

Tongan rugby union player

- Born: Nisifolo Naufahu; 30 October 1977 (age 49) Auckland, New Zealand
- Height: 6 ft 5 in (196 cm)
- Weight: 257 lb (117 kg)

Rugby union career
- Position(s): Number 8, Flanker, Lock
Amateur team(s)
Years	Team	Apps	(Points)
2000	Suburbs		
2002-2003	Otamatea		
Senior career
Years	Team	Apps	(Points)
2005–2007	RC Orléans	16	(10)
2007–2012	US Oyonnax	103	(15)
2012-2014	US Annecy	15	(0)
Provincial / State sides
Years	Team	Apps	(Points)
2000	Hawke's Bay	9	(0)
2002-2003	Northland	9	(5)
International career
Years	Team	Apps	(Points)
2001–2003	Tonga	16	(10)

Nisifolo Naufahu (born 30 October 1977 in Auckland) is a Tongan former rugby union player. He played as flanker, number 8 and lock.

== Career ==
Naufahu was first capped for Tonga during the match against Fiji in Nuku'alofa, on 25 May 2001. He was part of the 2003 Rugby World Cup roster, playing two matches in the tournament, with the pool stage match against Canada in Wollongong, on 29 October 2003 being his last test cap. At club level he played in the National Provincial Championship for Hawke's Bay and for Northland, and then, in France for RC Orléans, US Oyonnax and US Annecy.
