= Mark Taylor (rugby union, born 1973) =

Wales international rugby union footballer

- Born: Mark Taylor; 27 February 1973 (age 53) Blaenavon, Wales
- Height: 185 cm (6 ft 1 in)
- Weight: 95 kg (14 st 13 lb)
- School: Abersychan Comprehensive School; Pontypool College
- University: Southampton University
- Notable relative: Ivor Taylor (father)

Rugby union career
- Position(s): Centre, Wing
Youth career
- -: Blaenavon
Senior career
Years	Team	Apps	(Points)
1992-1995	Pontypool	53	(51)
1995-2003	Swansea	173	(330)
2003-2005	Scarlets	23	(15)
2005-2007	Sale	43	(15)
2007-2008	Ospreys	17	(0)
International career
Years	Team	Apps	(Points)
1994–2005	Wales	52	(60)
Coaching career
- Years: Team
- 2008-2010: Wales U18 Team Manager
- 2010-: Wales U20 Team Manager
- 2012-: Aberavon Backs

Mark Taylor (born 27 February 1973) is a former Wales national rugby union team player who played at centre. He is a former captain of Wales and was the first person to score a try at the newly built Millennium Stadium against South Africa in 1999. He signed for Sale Sharks from Llanelli Scarlets in April 2005 and in 2007 he returned to Wales to play rugby for the Ospreys. In the 2005–2006 season, Taylor started the final as Sale Sharks won their first Premiership title. He retired at the end of the 2007–2008 season.

He works part-time as a Chartered Account for H J Phillips (Peugeot), Llanelli and has done so since 1998. He is married to Nicola, Director of H J Phillips. Mark was previously the Team Manager for the Wales U20s national rugby union squad. Mark finished with the WRU u20's in July 2016 In August 2016 he became the Scarlets Team Manager
