= Ephraim Taukafa =

- Born: Ifalemi Taukafa; 26 June 1976 (age 50) Auckland, NZ
- Height: 5 ft 11 in (1.80 m)
- Weight: 238 lb (17 st 0 lb; 108 kg)

Rugby union career
- Position: Hooker
Senior career
Years	Team	Apps	(Points)
2003-2006	Leicester Tigers	10	(5)
2006-2007	Oyonnax	24	(15)
2007-2011	Lyon OU	88	(30)
2011-2014	Stade Montois	42	(2)
2014-2016	RC Chalon	23	(0)
2016-	Stade Dijonnais Côte D'Or	13	(5)
Provincial / State sides
Years	Team	Apps	(Points)
2003	North Harbour		
International career
Years	Team	Apps	(Points)
2002-2011	Tonga	33	(30)

Ephraim Taukafa (born 26 June 1976) is a Tongan rugby union footballer who now coaches in Dijon, France.

He played for Chalon-sur-Saône, and Stade Montois in France. Previously he played for North Harbour in New Zealand, Northern Suburbs in Australia, Leicester Tigers in England and Oyonnax (France) and Lyon OU in France. He played for the Tonga national team at the 2003, 2007 and 2011 Rugby World Cup.

In April 2021 he became forwards coach for Stade Nantais. In June 2022 he became assistant coach of Stade Niortais.
