= Pat Dunkley =

Canada international rugby union player

- Born: September 18, 1972 (age 54) Cardiff, Wales
- Height: 6 ft 0 in (183 cm)
- Weight: 205 lb (93 kg)
- School: Esquimalt Secondary School

Rugby union career
- Position: Hooker
International career
| Years | Team | Apps | (Points) |
| 1998–05 | Canada | 38 | (15) |

Pat Dunkley (born September 18, 1972) is a Canadian former international rugby union player.

== Rugby career ==
A James Bay hooker, Dunkley debuted for the Canada national team in 1998 and was a member of the squad for the 1999 Rugby World Cup, playing all three pool matches.

Dunkley developed the life-threatening flesh eating disease necrotizing fasciitis in his right leg from a cut received during a tour of Western Samoa in 2000 and required operations to save the leg.

After a successful return to club rugby, Dunkley was recalled by Canada in 2001 and captained his country at that year's Pacific Rim Rugby Championship.

Dunkley missed the 2003 Rugby World Cup with a rib injury.

== See also ==
- List of Canada national rugby union players
