= Nik Witkowski =

Canada international rugby union player

Nikyta Witkowski (born 2 June 1976 (age 50) in London, England) is a rugby centre for the Canadian national rugby team and for Coventry R.F.C. in England. He grew up in Montreal and played his rugby for the Montreal Wanderers RFC. He currently resides in Vancouver.

He has been capped 33 times for Canada.
