= Jim Love (rugby union) =

New Zealand rugby union coach (born 1953)

James Hector Love (born 17 January 1953), known as Jim Love, is a New Zealand rugby union coach and a former footballer.

He played for Marlborough, at the NPC, and was an international player for the New Zealand Māori team. He was also the coach for the Maori Squad, from 1998 to 2001, winning even 22 matches in a row. Love also helped Marlborough to win the NPC Division Three in 1997.

He was assigned to Tonga, in September 2001. He was the coach of the Oceanian team at the 2003 Rugby World Cup finals. Tonga lost all four matches, but achieved a bonus point in the 20–27 loss to Wales.

He was a co-founder in 1999 of the New Zealand Sports Academy in Rotorua with Darrall Shelford.

Since 2007 he has been coaching the Italian side Rugby Viadana; under his coaching Viadana won the 2006-07 Italian Cup.

Sporting positions
Preceded by (Tonga) Vaita Ueleni	Tonga National Rugby Union Coach; 2001–2003	Succeeded by (Australia) Viliami Ofahengaue
