= Benhur Kivalu =

Tonga international rugby union player

- Born: Daniel Benhur Kivalu; 2 September 1972 (age 54) Vailoa, Samoa
- Height: 6 ft 5 in (1.96 m)
- Weight: 286 lb (130 kg)

Rugby union career
- Position(s): Lock, Number 8
Amateur team(s)
Years	Team	Apps	(Points)
1995	Avalon		
Senior career
Years	Team	Apps	(Points)
1996–2004	Fukuoka Sanix Bombs		
2004–05	Kintetsu Liners		
Provincial / State sides
Years	Team	Apps	(Points)
1995-1996	Wellington B	2	(10)
International career
Years	Team	Apps	(Points)
1998–2005	Tonga	39	(40)

Benhur Kivalu (born 2 September 1972 in Vailoa) is a Samoan-born Tongan former rugby union player. He played as a lock and as a number eight.

== Career ==
His first international match for Tonga was against Samoa, at Sydney, on 18 September 1998. He was also part of the 1999 and 2003 World Cup rosters. His last match for the 'Ikale Tahi was against Samoa, at Nuku'alofa, on 22 July 2005.

== Post-career ==
After his playing career, he was the coach of Tonga national under-20 rugby union team. Currently, he is the "Regional Development Officer" for Tonga Rugby Union.
