= John Cannon (rugby union) =

Canada international rugby union player

- Born: John Cannon; 18 August 1980 Abbotsford, British Columbia
- Died: 19 March 2016 (aged 35)
- Height: 6 ft 2 in (1.88 m)
- Weight: 220 lb (100 kg; 15 st 10 lb)

Rugby union career
- Position: Centre
International career
Years	Team	Apps	(Points)
2001–2007	Canada	31	(0)

John Cannon (18 August 1980 – 19 March 2016) was a Canadian rugby union player. He earned 31 caps for Canada between 2001 and 2007, and was a member of the nation's 2003 Rugby World Cup squad. He played professionally in England for Rotherham, Doncaster and Coventry.
