= Sean Fauth =

Canada international rugby union player

- Born: February 8, 1975 (age 51) Calgary, Alberta, Canada
- Height: 5 ft 10 in (178 cm)
- Weight: 180 lb (82 kg)

Rugby union career
- Position: Wing
International career
Years	Team	Apps	(Points)
2000–03	Canada	29	(35)

Sean Fauth (born February 8, 1975) is a Canadian former international rugby union player.

Fauth was born and raised in Calgary, where he played rugby for the Hornets club. He competed in varsity rugby at Queen's University in the early 1990s and while based on the west coast played with Castaway Wanderers.

A winger, Fauth was a Canada international representative from 2000 to 2003, gaining 29 caps. He scored a try in both of Canada's matches in their two-Test series against England in 2001. At the 2003 Rugby World Cup in Australia, Fauth featured in Canada's match against the All Blacks and scored a try in the win over Tonga.

Fauth won blues playing rugby for Oxford University in 2005.

== See also ==
- List of Canada national rugby union players
