= Jared Barker =

Canada international rugby union player

- Born: 10 January 1975 (age 51) Edmonton, Alberta

Rugby union career
- Position: Fly-half
Senior career
Years	Team	Apps	(Points)
- Saracens
International career
Years	Team	Apps	(Points)
2000–2004	Canada	18	(226)
- Correct as of 2008-04-20

Jared Barker (born January 10, 1975, in Edmonton, Alberta) is a former rugby union footballer who played professionally in England, as well as internationally for Canada. Barker played mainly at fly-half and make his international debut in 2000 against Tonga, Barker played another two matches that year but did not play in 2001 due to injury. He played again in 2002 to help Canada qualify for the 2003 Rugby World Cup. He played for Canada in two of their matches at the 2003 World Cup; against Italy and New Zealand (the All Blacks). He played his last internationals in 2004.
