= Ryan Banks =

Canada international rugby union player (born 1972)

- Born: 2 February 1972 (age 54) Vancouver, BC, Canada
- Height: 6 ft 0 in (183 cm)
- Weight: 222 lb (101 kg)

Rugby union career
- Position: Back-row
International career
Years	Team	Apps	(Points)
1999–2003	Canada	36	(15)

Ryan Banks (born February 2, 1972) is a Canadian former rugby union international.

Banks, born in Vancouver, British Columbia, is a product of Abbotsford Senior Secondary School. He was a football linebacker on the Simon Fraser University team, before concentrating on rugby.

A back-row forward, Banks played for Burnaby Lake and earned 36 caps for Canada from 1999 to 2003, representing them in two editions of the Rugby World Cup. He played professionally for Bedford in the 1999–2000 Premiership Rugby season. In 2003, Banks filled in as captain for a World Cup match against the All Blacks.

Banks married rugby player Heather Wilson, who is also a two-time Canadian World Cup representative.

== See also ==
- List of Canada national rugby union players
