= Quentin Fyffe =

Canada international rugby union player

- Born: February 15, 1972 (age 54) Gosford, NSW, Australia
- Height: 5 ft 11 in (180 cm)
- Weight: 178 lb (81 kg)

Rugby union career
- Position: Wing / Fullback
International career
Years	Team	Apps	(Points)
2003–05	Canada	15	(25)

Quentin Fyffe (born February 15, 1972) is an Australian-born Canadian former international rugby union player.

== Biography ==
Fyffe grew up in Avoca Beach on the NSW Central Coast and in the late 1990s relocated to Calgary, where he played rugby for the Mavericks. He qualified to play for Canada on residency grounds.

From 2003 to 2005, Fyffe was capped 15 times by Canada, used mainly as a fullback. He competed at the 2003 Rugby World Cup which was held in his birth country and scored a late try against Italy in Canberra, as Canada came close to causing an upset. His appearances for Canada in 2005 were on the wing.

Fyffe is a former coach of the Canada women's national rugby union team.

== See also ==
- List of Canada national rugby union players
