= Marco Di Girolamo =

Canada international rugby union player

Marco Di Girolomo
- Born: May 9, 1977 (age 49) Toronto, Canada
- Height: 5 ft 10 in (178 cm)
- Weight: 198 lb (90 kg)

Rugby union career
- Position: Centre / Scrum-half
International career
Years	Team	Apps	(Points)
2001–04	Canada	21	(15)

Marco Di Girolomo (born May 9, 1977) is a Canadian former international rugby union player.

A product of the Aurora Barbarians, Di Girolomo competed on the Canada national team from 2001 to 2004, playing as a centre and scrum-half. In 2003, he was the only Canadian player to start all four pool matches at the Rugby World Cup in Australia. He represented Canada in rugby sevens at the 2002 Commonwealth Games and 2005 World Games.

He ran for Aurora Town Council in the 2022 and 2026 municipal elections.

== See also ==
- List of Canada national rugby union players
