= Ceri Sweeney =

Wales international rugby union footballer

- Born: 21 January 1980 (age 46) Glyncoch, Rhondda Cynon Taf, Wales
- Height: 1.80 m (5 ft 11 in)
- Weight: 86 kg (13 st 8 lb)

Rugby union career
- Position(s): Fly-half, Centre
Youth career
- Glyncoch RFC
Senior career
Years	Team	Apps	(Points)
1998–2003	Pontypridd RFC	91	
2003–2004	Celtic Warriors	12	(101)
2004–2008	Newport Gwent Dragons	86	(570)
2008–2013	Cardiff Blues	113	(331)
2013–2016	Exeter Chiefs	16	(108)
2016	Pontypridd RFC		
- Correct as of 22 March 2015
International career
Years	Team	Apps	(Points)
2003–2007	Wales	35	(88)

Ceri Sweeney (born 21 January 1980) is a rugby union footballer who plays at fly-half for Pontypridd RFC and Wales.

== Club career ==
In 1998, Sweeney joined Pontypridd RFC from Glyncoch RFC.

In 2003, with the introduction of regional rugby in Wales, Sweeney joined the Celtic Warriors. When the club was liquidated in the Summer of 2004 he signed for the Newport Gwent Dragons.

In the summer of 2008, after 4 seasons with the Newport Gwent Dragons Sweeney signed for the Cardiff Blues. Sweeney was told upon joining the Blues that he was signed to be used as an outside-half (his preferred position) as opposed to inside centre. This meant that Sweeney would be competing with Nicky Robinson for the number 10 jersey. He scored a try seconds after coming on in the EDF Energy Cup final against Gloucester at Twickenham on 18 April 2009.

Despite several times being linked with moves away from the capital city side, Sweeney remains at his home region. In 2012, ambitious Russian club Krasny Yar moved to make him the first Welsh international to play professionally in the Russian league. The switch was derailed at the last minute by budget issues at Cardiff Blues making it impossible for them to find a satisfactory replacement for the reliable Sweeney. The Russian option remains one Sweeney is keen to explore in future.

It was announced on 10 March 2013 that Sweeney would be joining English Aviva Premiership side Exeter Chiefs.

He announced his retirement in 2016. His total appearances for Pontypridd was 174 games and scored 967 points.

== International career ==
In 2003, Sweeney made his debut for Wales against England in the Six Nations Championship.

After playing well during the six nations, Sweeney was selected in the Wales squad for the 2003 Rugby World Cup. He was on the bench for the final pool game against New Zealand and came on just after half-time to make a big impact. His hand-off on Carlos Spencer saw him break straight through the defensive line with Colin Charvis in support. After passing to Charvis, who passed back to him, he was finally brought down by Doug Howlett just 1m short of the line. The ball was quickly passed out to Shane Williams on the left wing who finished the move by scoring a try.

Whilst playing against South Africa in 2004, his teammate Alix Popham was knocked unconscious whilst tackling. Sweeney noticed Popham was unconscious and acted quickly to prevent Popham from swallowing his own tongue.

In 2007 Sweeney was selected in the Wales squad for the 2007 World Cup.

On 16 April 2014 he was picked in the Barbarians squad to face Clontarf - being one of the biggest names in the squad.

== Personal ==
Ceri married his wife Helen in a luxurious ceremony in South Wales. They have two children.

He also studied electrics at Coleg Morgannwg.
