= Aaron Abrams (rugby union) =

Canada international rugby union player (born 1979)

- Full name: Aaron David Abrams
- Born: 9 July 1979 (age 47) London, Ontario

Rugby union career
- Position: Hooker
International career
Years	Team	Apps	(Points)
2003–2006	Canada	22	(10)
- Correct as of 13 September 2019

Aaron David Abrams (born 9 July 1979) is a former Canadian rugby union player. He played as a hooker and represented Canada internationally from 2003 to 2006. He was included in the Canadian squad for the 2003 Rugby World Cup and played in two group stage matches. Aaron finished that tournament as one of the try scorers for Canada.

Abrams was born in London, Ontario, and grew up in Mississauga, Ontario. Abrams was named most-valuable player for the Erindale Secondary School football and rugby teams. In his senior year he led the undefeated Erindale Raiders rugby team in scoring, and was named the Toronto Star's High School Athlete of the Week. He was also a member of the national U-17 rugby team.

In 1998, Abrams was one of the captains for the Ontario junior men's rugby team, and was selected for the national U-20 team.

After graduating the Victoria PacificSport Under-23 program, Abrams played for the Vancouver Island Crimson Tide and in 2003 was selected for the Rugby Canada All-Stars. A non-travelling reserve player for Team Canada, a teammate's injury in practice allowed him to take part in the 2003 World Cup.

In December 2004, Abrams was appointed the national team's player representative to the Rugby Canada Board. In 2005, Abrams was one of two players to take part in all eight international games for Canada.

He played for the Castaway Wanderers RFC in the CDI Premier League, while continuing on Team Canada in 2006 and 2007.
