= Rhys Williams (rugby union, born 1980) =

- Born: Gethin Rhys Williams; 23 February 1980 (age 46) Cardiff, South Glamorgan, Wales
- Height: 5 ft 9 in (1.75 m)
- Weight: 13 st 7 lb (86 kg)
- School: Ysgol Iolo Morganwg; Cowbridge Comprehensive School

Rugby union career
- Position(s): Full Back, Wing, Centre
Senior career
Years	Team	Apps	(Points)
1998-2008	Cardiff Blues	181	(265)
International career
Years	Team	Apps	(Points)
2000-2005	Wales	44	(80)

Gethin Rhys Williams (born 23 February 1980 in Cardiff) is a Welsh rugby union player who played for Cardiff Blues and won 44 caps for the Wales national rugby union team as a full-back and winger. During the 2005-2006 season Williams was the captain of the Cardiff Blues.
