= Colin Yukes =

Canada international rugby union player (born 1979)

Colin Yukes (born October 23, 1979, in Edmonton, Alberta) is a Canadian rugby player.

He has represented Canada 27 times including at the 2003 Rugby World Cup. Colin started his rugby career with the Strathcona Druids, Sherwood Park, AB, Canada. He now plays professionally with SU Agen Lot-et-Garonne, in France.
