= Marco Bortolami =

Italy international rugby union player

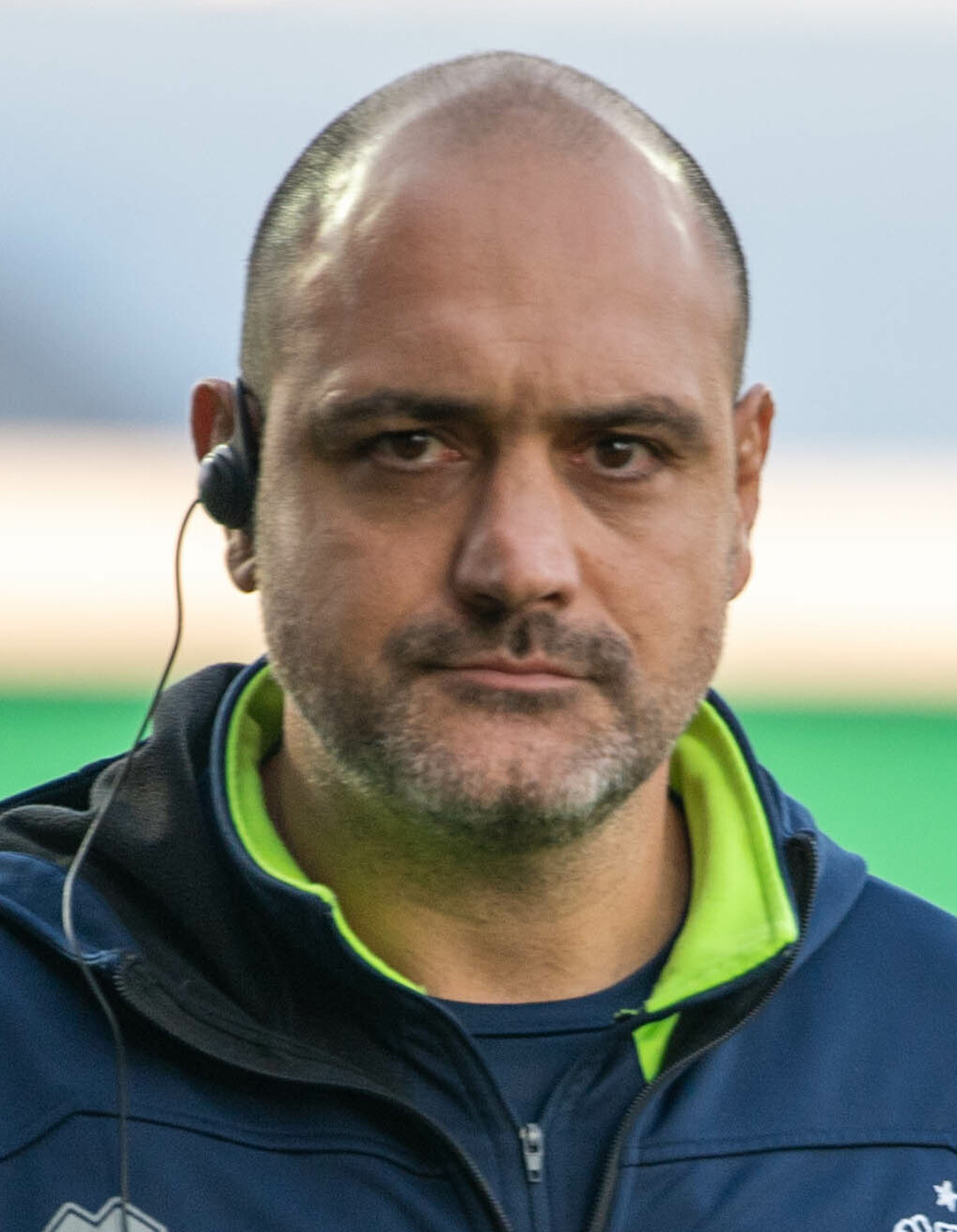
- Born: Marco Bortolami; 12 June 1980 (age 46) Padua, Veneto, Italy
- Height: 1.96 m (6 ft 5 in)
- Weight: 112 kg (247 lb; 17.6 st)
- School: Northern Elementary

Rugby union career
- Position: Lock
Senior career
Years	Team	Apps	(Points)
1999–2004	Petrarca	84	(40)
2004–2006	Narbonne	45	(0)
2006–2010	Gloucester	74	(10)
2010–2012	Aironi	40	(0)
2012–2016	Zebre	66	(5)
- Correct as of 25 November 2016
International career
Years	Team	Apps	(Points)
2000–2001	Italy U21	3	(0)
2001	Italy A		
2001–2015	Italy	112	(35)
- Correct as of 14 July 2016
Coaching career
- Years: Team
- 2016–2021: Benetton (Assistant Coach)
- 2021−2025: Benetton (Head Coach)
- 2025: Sale Sharks (Head Coach)
- 2026: Georgia (Caretaker coach)
- 2026–: Georgia (Assistant Coach)

Marco Bortolami ([ˈmarko bɔrtoˈlami]; born 12 June 1980) is an Italian professional rugby union coach and former professional player, whose career includes experience playing in the national top-level Italian (Petrarca Padova), French (RC Narbonne), and English (Gloucester Rugby) championships, before joining the then recently-born Pro14 (with Aironi Rugby and then Zebre). Praised for his leadership skills, he captained all the teams he played for at professional level. At international level, he also captained the Italian side from 2002 until the 2007 Rugby World Cup, before being replaced in the permanent role by Sergio Parisse.

He is the currently the caretaker head coach for the Georgian national team.

== Club career ==
Bortolami began his playing career with the team of his native Padua, making his senior debut as a second row aged only 18.

In 2004, Bortolami left Petrarca and signed for French side RC Narbonne, and after a two-year spell in the French Top14, he joined English Premiership side Gloucester Rugby in 2006. During this time, he was considered by many to be one of the best players in the world around the time, being selected into the starting team for their first game of the season and immediately taking the role of captain. He made up a formidable partnership with Alex Brown and shared captaincy with Peter Buxton.

Due to injuries and his World Cup commitments, the 2007–08 season ended up not being as consistent in performance and he lost the Italian captaincy to Italian No. 8 Sergio Parisse, but continued to put in powerful performances for Gloucester. His outstanding leadership qualities meant he retained captaincy. He made 23 appearances for Gloucester in 2008–09.

In 2010 he returned to Italy signing for the new Aironi team which started to compete in the Celtic League from the 2010–11 season. After Aironi folded due to financial problems, Bortolami signed for the new franchise Zebre in the Pro12 for the 2012/13 season.

On 7 May 2016, Bortolami announced his retirement from professional rugby with immediate effect.

== International career ==
Bortolami was made captain of Italy's Under-21 side, before making his international debut at elite level against Namibia in June, 2001, when he was just 20.

At the age of 22, Bortolami was made Italy's youngest ever captain by then coach John Kirwan.

In his first-ever World Cup start, against Tonga, he suffered an injury and missed the decisive group-stage match against Wales, which saw the Azzurri eliminated from the competition.

After impressing in the 2004 Six Nations Championship, he was once awarded the full captaincy for the 2005 Summer tour of Japan by coach Pierre Berbizier. After this tour he joined French club Narbonne.

In the 2007 Six Nations Championship, Bortolami led Italy to their first away win in the competition against Scotland at Murrayfield, which was also the first time Italy have won more than one game in a single Six Nations Championship. At the 2007 Rugby World Cup, he led the Italian team to a decisive final group-stage match against Scotland, again missing access to the knock-out stage.

With the 2008 Six Nations Championship, under new coach Nick Mallett, Bortolami was replaced as Italian skipper by Sergio Parisse.

Bortolami suffered an injury against Australia in June 2012, but in May 2013 it was announced that he would be returning to the international stage.

== Coaching career ==
Bortolami left Zebre at the end of the 2015–16 Pro12 season, and immediately became an assistant coach at Benetton Treviso under kiwi Kieran Crowley.

After Crowely was appointed the national head coach of Italy in the summer of 2021, Bortolami was promoted to ahead of the inaugural United Rugby Championship season.

In his first season in charge he led Benetton to thirteenth place in the URC, before raising the side up to eleventh in 2022/23. In that same season, he also guided the Italian side to historic results in Europe, taking the side to the 2022/23 EPCR Challenge Cup Semi-finals.

During the 2023/24 United Rugby Championship season, he led the side to their first knock-out stage of the URC since 2019, and their second consecutive EPCR Challenge Cup Semi-final.

In February 2025 it was announced he was to part ways with the club at the end of the 2024–25 season to become the Head Coach of Sale Sharks in the Gallagher Premiership starting in the 2025/26 season. However his period there ended early, with his departure being brought forward to December 2025.

His tenure with the English based side later ended after just five months, leaving the club under mutual consent in December 2025.

In January 2026, he was later announced as forwards coach for the Georgian national team, but will initially serve as caretaker head coach from January to June 2026 until newly appointed head coach Pierre-Henry Broncan becomes available.

== Other information ==
In an interview in 2006, Bortolami stated that he wished to become a mechanic for Ferrari after retiring from professional rugby, using his mechanical skills he had picked up in college. Shortly after this interview was published, he received a letter from Ferrari offering him a position upon ending his rugby career. However, something must have changed since, as in fact, after his last match on 7 May 2016, Bortolami begun coaching the forwards of Benetton Treviso in Italy.

Despite never been considered a violent player, his rough and direct playing style, together with his at times conflictual relationship with referees, have led Bortolami to collect seven yellow cards in his long international career, surpassed in this unenviable ranking only by the Australian Michael Hooper and the Georgian Viktor Kolelishvili, both with eight.

Preceded by (England) Richard Cockerill	Georgian national rugby coach 2026	Succeeded by (France) Pierre-Henry Broncan
