= Josh Jackson (rugby union) =

Canada international rugby union player

- Born: Joshua Jackson; 2 October 1980 (age 46) Fergus, Ontario
- Height: 198 cm (6 ft 6 in)
- Weight: 112 kg (17 st 9 lb)

Rugby union career
- Position: Lock / Flanker / No. 8
Senior career
Years	Team	Apps	(Points)
2005-2006	Stade Bordelais		
2006-2010	Bordeaux		
2010-	Stade Montois		
International career
Years	Team	Apps	(Points)
2003-	Canada	22	(0)

Josh Jackson (born 2 October 1980 in Fergus, Ontario) is a Canadian rugby union player. He can play at lock or in the backrow.

Jackson currently plays his rugby with Stade Montois in the French Rugby Pro D2. He has played previously for the Canadian club Castaway Wanderers and French clubs Stade Bordelais and Bordeaux Bègles.

He has been part of the Canadian national team since his debut on 23 August 2003, in a 21–11 victory over Uruguay. He participated in both the 2003 and 2007 Rugby World Cups.

Jackson currently holds 22 caps but has yet to score his first points for Canada.
