= Gonzalo Canale =

Italy international rugby union player

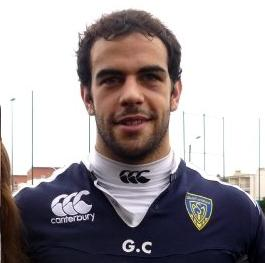
- Born: Gonzalo Canale; 11 November 1982 (age 44) Córdoba, Argentina
- Height: 1.80 m (5 ft 11 in)
- Weight: 91 kg (201 lb)

Rugby union career
- Position: Centre / Wing / Fullback
- Current team: Retired
Senior career
Years	Team	Apps	(Points)
2001–05	Treviso	46	(125)
2005–12	Clermont	124	(90)
2012–15	La Rochelle	27	(25)
- Correct as of 10 July 2016
International career
Years	Team	Apps	(Points)
2003–2013	Italy	86	(35)
- Correct as of 10 July 2016

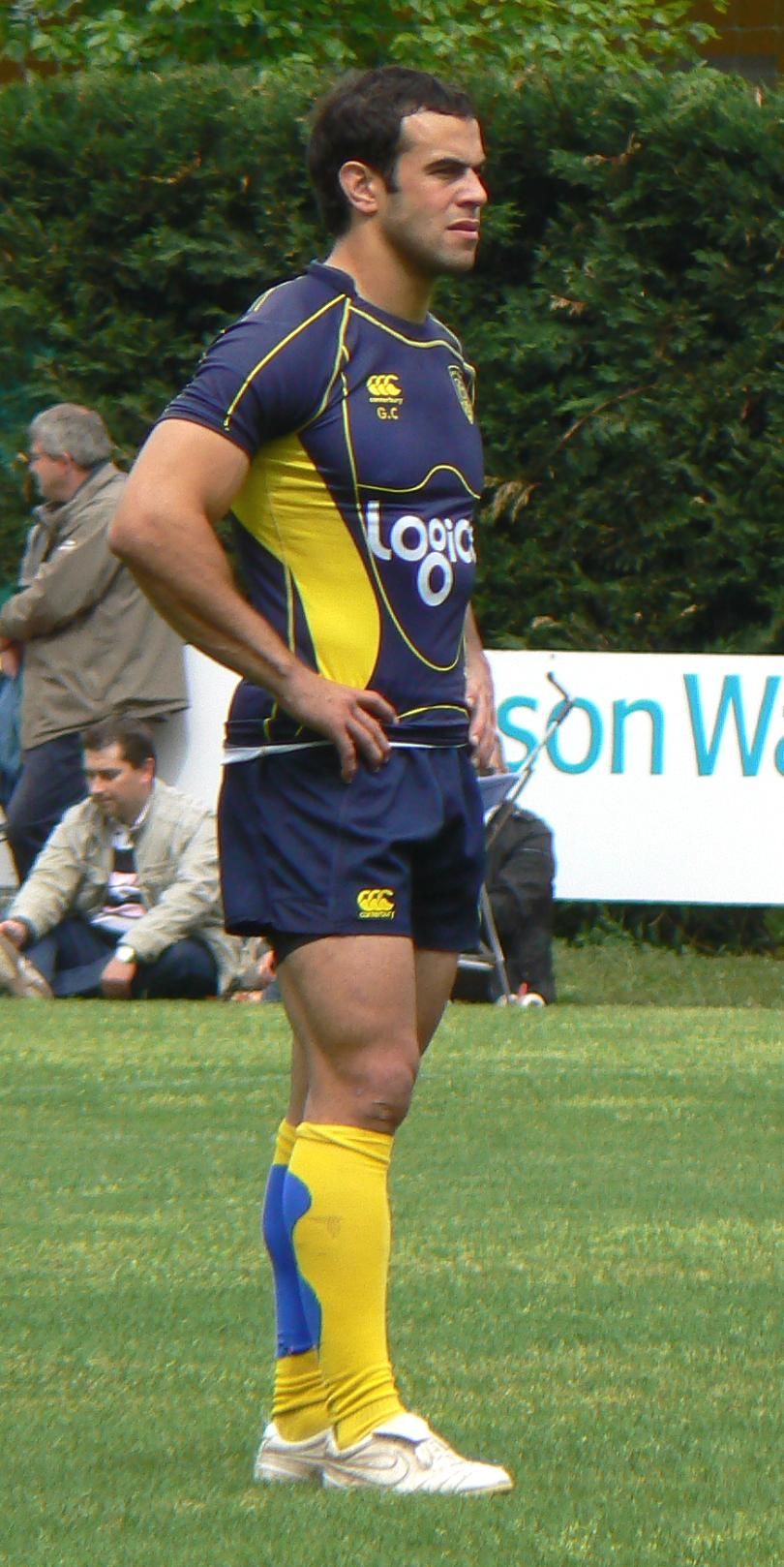
Canale training with Clermont Auvergne in 2010

Gonzalo Canale (born 11 November 1982) is an Italian Argentine rugby union footballer. His usual position is in the centre or at full back. He plays for French club ASM Clermont Auvergne. Canale has also been capped for the Italy national team, and was a part of their squad at the 2003 Rugby World Cup in Australia and the 2011 Rugby World Cup in New Zealand.

He was a replacement in the final as Clermont won the Top 14 title in 2009–10.

== International career ==
Born in Córdoba, Canale is of Italian descent through great-grandparents from Piedmont. He was trained and taught rugby in Argentina, where he played for La Tablada between the ages of 10 and 18. Canale later moved to Italy, and would go on to represent that country at both the under-19 and under-21 level during his early career. He made his full international debut for Italy in 2003 against Scotland, at age 20. He was then included in Italy's 2003 Rugby World Cup squad.

Injury saw that Canale missed the first two games of the 2004 Six Nations Championship, but returned to play a key role in the victory over Scotland. During the subsequent summer he toured Romania and Japan, scoring his first try for Italy on tour. He impressed in the Heineken Cup for Treviso as well, including scoring a try against Bath. He has since left Treviso, and signed with French club ASM Clermont.

Canale announced his retirement from rugby in 2015 after being unable to recover from an injury.
