= Tonga national rugby union team =

Rugby union team

Tonga
- Nickname: ʻIkale Tahi (The Sea Eagles)
- Emblem: White dove
- Union: Tonga Rugby Union
- Head coach: Tevita Tuʻifua
- Captain: Ben Tameifuna
- Most caps: Sonatane Takulua (58)
- Top scorer: Kurt Morath (340)
- Top try scorer: Fetuʻu Vainikolo & Sonatane Takulua (17)
- Home stadium: Teufaiva Sport Stadium
First colours	Second colours

World Rugby ranking
- Current: 19 (as of 18 November 2024)
- Highest: 9 (2011, 2012)
- Lowest: 20 (2005, 2006)

First international
- Tonga 9–6 Fiji (Nukuʻalofa, Tonga; 25 August 1924)

Biggest win
- Tonga 119–0 South Korea (Nukuʻalofa, Tonga; 22 March 2003)

Biggest defeat
- New Zealand 102–0 Tonga (Auckland, New Zealand; 16 June 2000); New Zealand 102–0 Tonga (Auckland, New Zealand; 3 July 2021)

World Cup
- Appearances: 9 (first in 1987)
- Best result: Pool stage (1987, 1995, 1999, 2003, 2007, 2011, 2015, 2019, 2023)
Medal record
Pacific Games
Gold medal – first place	1979 Suva
Silver medal – second place	1963 Suva
Bronze medal – third place	1983 Apia

The Tonga national rugby union team (Tongan: timi feohi ʻakapulu fakafonua ʻa Tonga) represents Tonga in men's international rugby union. The team is nicknamed ʻIkale Tahi (Sea Eagles) and is governed by the Tonga Rugby Union. Like their Polynesian neighbours, the Tongans precede their matches with a traditional challenge – the Sipi Tau. They are members of the Pacific Islands Rugby Alliance (PIRA) along with Fiji and Samoa. The Ikale Tahi achieved a historic 19–14 victory over France in the 2011 Rugby World Cup, but having lost to New Zealand and Canada, were unable to achieve what would have been their first-ever presence at the quarter-finals.

== History ==
Rugby was brought to the region in the early 20th century by sailors and missionaries, and the Tonga Rugby Football Union was formed in late 1923. Tonga beat Fiji 9–6 in their first test in 1924 played in the capital Nukuʻalofa. However, Tonga lost the second test 14–3 and drew the decider 0–0.

Between 1924 and 1938 Tonga and Fiji played three test series every alternate year. Matches between the two Pacific nations were hard fought; many have claimed that the ancient feuding wars between the Islanders were transplanted onto the rugby field. Troubles during the third Test of Fiji's 1928 tour to Tonga forced the game to be abandoned with Tonga leading 11–8. In 1954 Tonga played host to a touring Western Samoa.

Tonga beat New Zealand Maori in 1969, but had to wait until 1973 before they played their second test match, a 30–12 defeat against Australia in Sydney. They got their revenge when they beat Australia in Ballymore, Brisbane 16–11, scoring four tries to two in June 1973. The following year they traveled to the Arms Park for a non-cap international against Wales, a game that ended in a 26–7 defeat.

The first Tongan tour to Great Britain was in 1974, when they played 10 games, including those in Wales against East Wales, Llanelli, North Wales, Newport, West Wales and a Wales XV. The only tour victory was by 18–13 in the opener against East Wales. The 'tests' were lost by 44–8 to a Scotland XV and by 26–7 to the Wales XV.

They remained a little-known quantity in Europe until 1986, when Wales embarked on a tour of Fiji, Tonga and Western Samoa. Early in the game against Tonga, Welsh flanker Mark Brown was knocked over by three Tongan forwards, leading to a mass brawl involving the entire team except Malcolm Dacey and Mark Titley. Robert Jones describes the event in his book Raising The Dragon as "the worst brawl I have ever seen on a rugby field." At the post-match dinner Jonathan Davies was asked to give a few words in Welsh and as the hosts politely applauded he described them as "the dirtiest team I have ever played against"

Tonga were drawn to play Wales again in the inaugural 1987 Rugby World Cup in New Zealand. The previous meeting, plus the decision to rest some of the leading players, led to a poor Welsh performance though they managed to win 29–16. Tonga lost its other two games to Ireland (32–9) and Canada (37–4).

They failed to qualify for the 1991 Rugby World Cup. In 1994 they won the South Pacific championship on try count and so qualified for the Super 10, in which they finished bottom of their pool with only one point.

They qualified for the 1995 World Cup ahead of Fiji on points difference. Tonga managed only two victories in the next two World Cups, against the 29–11 Côte d'Ivoire in 1995 and Italy in 1999. The win over the Côte d'Ivoire brought tragedy when Ivorian winger Max Brito was left paralysed.

June 1999 brought a 20–16 defeat of France in Nukuʻalofa over a touring France but in 2000 they were defeated 102–0 (including 15 tries) by New Zealand.

After losing their first four matches to Fiji and Samoa, Tonga finished third in the Oceania qualifying group. As a result, they had to play home and away matches against Papua New Guinea, which they won 47–14 and 84–12, followed by a play-off against South Korea, who finished as runners-up in the Asian section. Tonga thrashed them 75–0 and 119–0.

At the 2003 Rugby World Cup Tonga lost all their games and finished bottom of their pool. Although they kept Wales to 20–27, they were again thrashed by New Zealand 91–7.

In 2007 Tonga participated in the 2007 Rugby World Cup, winning two of their pool matches and nearly defeating the eventual champions, South Africa, before losing 30–25.

Tonga achieved one of the most unexpected victories in Rugby World Cup history with their 19–14 win over France in the 2011 World Cup.

On 24 November 2012, Tonga beat Scotland, at Pittodrie Stadium, 21–15 for their first victory over a traditional rugby power on a European pitch.

== Sipi Tau ==
Like several Pacific rugby nations, Tonga has a pre-game war dance, called the Sipi Tau. It is a form of the Kailao, which was originally a war dance that was imported to Tonga from Wallis Island. It is usually performed at both public and private ceremonies.

During the 2003 Rugby World Cup in Australia, in Tonga's match against New Zealand, the All Blacks began their traditional haka, and then Tonga answered to the haka through the Sipi Tau while the All Blacks were performing, bringing the teams within metres of one another just prior to kick-off.

== Performance ==
=== Overall record ===
Men's World Rugby Rankings Top 20 as of 16 November 2026
Rank	Change (Note: Change from the previous week)	Team	Points
1	Steady	South Africa	91.53
2	Steady	New Zealand	90.65
3	▲1	France	89.05
4	▼1	Ireland	88.70
5	Steady	England	86.99
6	Steady	Scotland	85.28
7	Steady	Australia	82.24
8	Steady	Argentina	82.09
9	▲1	Wales	79.37
10	▼1	Fiji	77.79
11	Steady	Italy	75.84
12	Steady	Japan	75.25
13	Steady	Georgia	74.23
14	▲1	United States	68.39
15	▼1	Portugal	68.24
16	▲3	Samoa	67.60
17	▲1	Chile	67.00
18	▼2	Spain	66.53
19	▼2	Tonga	65.58
20	Steady	Uruguay	65.17

Tonga's historical rankings

Source: World Rugby
Graph updated to 16 November 2026

Below is table of the representative rugby matches played by a Tongan national XV at test level up until 17 October 2025.

Opponent	Played	Won	Lost	Drawn	Win %	For	Aga	Diff
Argentina	2	0	2	0	0.00%	28	73	−45
Australia	4	1	3	0	25%	42	167	−125
Australia A	4	1	3	0	25%	71	210	−139
Canada	13	7	6	0	53.85%	303	295	+8
Chile	2	2	0	0	100%	71	40	+31
Cook Islands	4	4	0	0	100%	289	32	+257
England	4	0	4	0	0.00%	36	241	−205
England Saxons	1	0	1	0	0.00%	14	41	−27
Fiji	96	27	66	3	28.13%	1,286	1,963	−677
France	6	2	4	0	33.33%	96	172	−76
(France) French Barbarians	3	2	1	0	66.67%	94	107	-13
Georgia	7	2	5	0	28.57%	141	119	+22
Hong Kong	1	1	0	0	100%	44	22	+22
Ireland	3	0	3	0	0.00%	44	131	−87
Italy	6	2	4	0	33.33%	96	190	−94
Ivory Coast	1	1	0	0	100%	29	11	+18
Japan	20	9	11	0	45%	493	542	−49
Namibia	2	2	0	0	100%	55	35	+20
New Caledonia	1	1	0	0	100.00%	58	3	+55
New Zealand	7	0	7	0	0.00%	42	519	−477
Junior All Blacks	3	0	3	0	0.00%	48	124	−76
Māori	12	4	8	0	33.33%	165	319	−154
Papua New Guinea	2	2	0	0	100%	131	26	+105
Portugal	1	1	0	0	100%	24	19	+5
Romania	6	3	3	0	50%	144	136	+8
Samoa	71	28	39	4	39.44%	1,075	1,350	−275
Scotland	6	1	5	0	16.67%	89	241	−152
Scotland XV	2	0	2	0	0.00%	13	67	−54
Solomon Islands	1	1	0	0	100%	92	3	+89
South Korea	6	6	0	0	100%	464	66	+398
South Africa	3	0	3	0	0.00%	53	153	−100
Spain	3	2	1	0	66.67%	88	48	+40
Tahiti	1	1	0	0	100%	74	0	+74
Uruguay	1	1	0	0	100%	43	19	+24
United States	11	9	2	0	81.82%	289	189	+100
Wales	9	0	9	0	0.00%	108	301	−193
Wales XV	1	0	1	0	0.00%	7	26	−19
Zimbabwe	1	1	0	0	100%	42	13	+29
Total	327	124	196	7	37.92%	6,281	8,013	−1,732

=== World Cup record ===
Rugby World Cup record									Qualification						
Year	Round	Pld	W	D	L	PF	PA	Squad	Pos	Pld	W	D	L	PF	PA
(New Zealand) (Australia) 1987	Pool stage	3	0	0	3	29	98	Squad	Invited						
(England) (France) (Ireland) (Scotland) (Wales) 1991	Did not qualify								3rd	3	1	0	2	64	62
(South Africa) 1995	Pool stage	3	1	0	2	44	90	Squad	P/O	2	1	0	1	34	26
(Wales) 1999	Pool stage	3	1	0	2	47	171	Squad	P/O	9	5	0	4	341	178
(Australia) 2003	Pool stage	4	0	0	4	46	178	Squad	P/O	8	4	0	4	398	178
(France) 2007	Pool stage	4	2	0	2	89	96	Squad	P/O	7	3	0	4	329	136
(New Zealand) 2011	Pool stage	4	2	0	2	80	98	Squad	Automatically qualified						
(England) 2015	Pool stage	4	1	0	3	70	130	Squad	Automatically qualified						
(Japan) 2019	Pool stage	4	1	0	3	67	105	Squad	2nd	4	1	0	3	68	93
(France) 2023	Pool stage	4	1	0	3	96	177	Squad	P/O	4	2	0	2	126	111
(Australia) 2027	Qualified								1st	4	2	0	2	99	134
(United States) 2031	To be determined								To be determined						
Total	—	33	9	0	24	568	1143	—	—	41	19	0	22	1398	832
Champions; Runners–up; Third place; Fourth place; Home venue

=== Pacific Nations Cup ===
Tonga previously competed in the Pacific Tri-Nations winning three tournaments. The Pacific Nations Cup replaced the Tri-Nations tournament in 2006. Tonga have yet to win a tournament.

Tournament	Won	Drawn	Lost	Tonga finish
2006	2	0	2	4th / 5
2007	1	0	4	5th / 6
2008	1	0	4	6th / 6
2009	0	0	4	5th / 5
2010	0	0	3	4th / 4
2011	2	0	1	2nd / 4
2012	1	0	2	3rd / 4
2013	2	0	2	3rd / 5
2014	0	1	1	3rd / 3
2015	3	0	1	3rd / 6
2016	0	0	2	3rd / 3
2017	1	0	1	2nd / 3
2018	1	0	1	2nd / 4
2019	1	0	2	5th / 6
2022	0	0	3	4th / 4
2024	1	0	2	5th / 6
2025	2	0	2	3rd / 6
Total	18	1	37	0 titles

=== Wins against Tier 1 nations ===
Tonga have recorded six wins against tier 1 opposition.

30 June 1973	Australia	11–16	Tonga	Ballymore Stadium, Brisbane
	Try: Cole; Tindall; Pen: McGill	Report	Try: Kavapalu; Latu; Mafi Pahulu; Vave	Attendance: 9,563; Referee: Bob Burnett (Australia)

16 June 1999	Tonga	20–16	France	Teufaiva Sport Stadium, Nukuʻalofa
	Try: Taufahema; Taumalolo (2); Con: Sateki Tuipulotu; Pen: Sateki Tuipulotu	Report	Try: Sarraméa; Con: Lamaison; Pen: Lamaison (3)	Attendance: 7,000; Referee: Clayton Thomas (Wales)

10 October 1999	Italy	25–28	Tonga	Welford Road, Leicester
	Try: Moscardi; Con: Domínguez; Pen: Domínguez (6)	Report	Try: Fatani; Taufahema; Sateki Tuipulotu; Con: Sateki Tuipulotu (2); Pen: Sateki Tuipulotu (2); Drop: Sateki Tuipulotu	Attendance: 10,244; Referee: David McHugh (Ireland)

1 October 2011	France	14–19	Tonga	Westpac Stadium, Wellington
	Try: Clerc 80' m Pen: Yachvili (3/3) 1', 23', 49'	Report	Try: Hufanga 26' c Con: Morath (1/1) 28'; Pen: Morath (4/8) 6', 35', 66', 72'	Attendance: 32,763; Referee: Steve Walsh (Australia)

24 November 2012	Scotland	15–21	Tonga	Pittodrie, Aberdeen
	Pen: Laidlaw (5/7) 10', 38', 46', 55', 61'	Report	Try: Lokotui 51' c Vainikolo 65' m Con: Apikotoa (1/2) 52'; Pen: Apikotoa (3/5) 5', 64', 72'	Attendance: 20,306; Referee: Mathieu Raynal (France)

26 November 2016	Italy	17–19	Tonga	Stadio Euganeo, Padua
15:00 CET (UTC+1)	Try: Cittadini 12' c Allan 54' c Con: Canna (1/1) 13'; Allan (1/1) 55'; Pen: Padovani (1/1) 77'	Report	Try: Piutau 51' c Con: Takulua (1/1) 53'; Pen: Takulua (4/5) 32', 45', 77', 80'	Attendance: 18,125; Referee: John Lacey (Ireland)

== Players ==
=== Current squad ===
On 9 October, Tonga named a 30-player squad ahead of the 2026 World Rugby Nations Cup European-African-Asian Series.

Head coach: (Tonga) Tevita Tuʻifua

- Caps Updated: 14 November 2026 (after Georgia v Tonga)

Player	Position	Date of birth (age)	Caps	Club/province
Sekope Lopeti-Moli	Hooker	12 August 1996 (age 30)	6	(New Zealand) Wellington
Efi Ma'afu	Hooker	23 January 1998 (age 28)	2	(France) Nevers
Siua Maile	Hooker	18 February 1997 (age 29)	21	(Italy) Benetton
Siegfried Fisiʻihoi	Prop	8 June 1987 (age 39)	39	(France) Massy
Phil Kite	Prop	24 April 1993 (age 33)	6	(France) Colomiers
Paula Latu	Prop	14 February 1996 (age 30)	9	(New Zealand) Southland
Ben Tameifuna	Prop	30 August 1991 (age 35)	48	(France) Bordeaux Bègles
Toma'akino Taufa	Prop	9 March 1995 (age 31)	5	(France) Bordeaux Bègles
Siate Tokolahi	Prop	16 March 1992 (age 34)	5	(France) Pau
Adam Coleman	Lock	7 October 1991 (age 35)	5	(France) Bordeaux Bègles
Leva Fifita	Lock	29 July 1989 (age 37)	42	(France) Auch
Justin Mataele	Lock		7	(England) Ampthill
Veikoso Poloniati	Lock	27 August 1995 (age 31)	11	(New Zealand) Counties Manukau
Lotu Inisi	Back row	26 April 1999 (age 27)	16	(Japan) Red Hurricanes Osaka
Semisi Paea	Back row	17 April 1999 (age 27)	14	(Wales) Cardiff
Otunuku Pauta	Back row	13 February 1999 (age 27)	4	(France) Grenoble
Sam Tuitupou	Back row	24 February 2005 (age 21)	5	(New Zealand) North Harbour
Sione Vailanu	Back row	27 January 1995 (age 31)	19	(France) Biarritz
Siaosi Nginingini	Scrum-half	17 October 1998 (age 28)	8	(New Zealand) Auckland
Manu Paea	Scrum-half	17 September 2001 (age 25)	16	
Sonatane Takulua	Scrum-half	11 January 1991 (age 35)	70	(France) Nantes
Patrick Pellegrini	Fly-half	28 September 1998 (age 28)	22	(New Zealand) Otago
Manu Vunipola	Fly-half	4 May 2000 (age 26)	2	(Japan) Sayama Secom Rugguts
Malakai Fekitoa	Centre	10 May 1992 (age 34)	15	(France) Béziers
Ngani Laumape	Centre	22 April 1993 (age 33)	0	(New Zealand) Manawatu
Fetuli Paea	Centre	16 August 1994 (age 32)	22	(Wales) Dragons
Fine Inisi	Wing	19 May 1998 (age 28)	21	(Wales) Dragons
John Tapueluelu	Wing	7 April 1999 (age 27)	16	(New Zealand) Manawatu
Sione Tui	Wing	8 July 1999 (age 27)	2	(France) Provence
Anzelo Tuitavuki	Wing	10 October 1998 (age 28)	12	(Wales) Dragons
Taniela Filimone	Fullback	1 June 1999 (age 27)	10	(New Zealand) Manawatu

== Individual all-time records ==
=== Most caps ===
#	Player	Pos	Span	Mat	Start	Sub	Pts	Tries	Conv	Pens	Drop	Won	Lost	Draw	%
1	Sonatane Takulua	Scrum-half	2014–present	69	60	9	288	19	44	35	0	27	41	1	39.13
2	Nili Latu	Flanker	2006–2017	48	47	1	28	5	0	1	0	19	28	1	40.62
3	Ben Tameifuna	Prop	2017-present	45	35	10	30	6	0	0	0	14	30	0	31.82
4	Vunga Lilo	Fullback	2007–2018	44	41	3	87	12	3	7	0	19	25	0	43.18
5	Siale Piutau	Wing	2011–2019	43	41	2	32	6	1	0	0	17	25	1	40.69
6	Steve Mafi	Lock	2010–2023	42	31	11	10	2	0	0	0	20	22	0	48.42
7	Elisi Vunipola	Fly-half	1990–2005	41	40	1	50	8	2	2	0	15	26	0	36.58
8	Kurt Morath	Fly-half	2009–2021	40	34	6	340	2	48	78	0	18	22	0	47.36
9	Pierre Hola	Fly-half	1998–2009	39	38	1	322	12	68	42	3	19	20	0	48.72
9	Benhur Kivalu	Number 8	1998–2005	39	35	4	40	8	0	0	0	14	24	1	37.17

Last updated: Hong Kong vs Tonga, 21 November 2026. Statistics include officially capped matches only.

=== Most tries ===
#	Player	Pos	Span	Mat	Start	Sub	Pts	Tries	Conv	Pens	Drop
1	Sonatane Takulua	Scrum-half	2014–present	69	60	9	288	19	44	35	0
2	Fetuʻu Vainikolo	Wing	2011–2016	28	27	1	85	17	0	0	0
3	Josh Taumalolo	Centre	1996–2007	26	23	3	118	14	6	12	0
4	Pierre Hola	Fly-half	1998–2009	39	38	1	322	12	68	42	3
4	Vunga Lilo	Fullback	2007–2018	44	41	3	87	12	3	7	0
6	Telusa Veainu	Wing	2015–present	18	17	1	55	11	0	0	0
7	Fepikou Tatafu	Centre	1996–2002	23	21	2	50	10	0	0	0
8	Viliame Iongi	Wing	2011–2016	21	15	6	45	9	0	0	0
8	Benhur Kivalu	Number 8	1998–2005	39	35	4	45	9	0	0	0
10	Elisi Vunipola	Fly-half	1990–2005	41	40	1	50	8	2	2	0

Last updated: Hong Kong vs Tonga, 21 November 2026. Statistics include officially capped matches only.

=== Leading point scorers ===
#	Player	Pos	Span	Mat	Start	Sub	Pts	Tries	Conv	Pens	Drop
1	Kurt Morath	Fly-half	2009–2021	40	34	6	340	2	48	78	0
2	Pierre Hola	Fly-half	1998–2009	39	38	1	322	12	68	42	3
3	Sonatane Takulua	Scrum-half	2014–present	69	60	9	288	19	44	35	0
4	Sateki Tuipulotu	Fullback	1993–2003	20	19	1	190	5	33	32	1
5	Fangatapu Apikotoa	Fly-half	2004–2014	30	20	10	147	2	40	19	0
6	Patrick Pellegrini	Fly-half	2023-present	22	15	7	134	5	35	13	0
7	Josh Taumalolo	Centre	1996–2007	26	23	3	118	14	6	12	0
8	Kusitafu Tonga	Fullback	1996–2001	13	12	1	114	1	32	15	0
9	William Havili	Fly-half	2022-present	20	20	0	87	1	23	12	0
9	Vunga Lilo	Fullback	2007–2018	44	41	3	87	12	3	7	0

Last updated: Hong Kong vs Tonga, 21 November 2026. Statistics include officially capped matches only.

=== Most points in a match ===
#	Player	Pos	Pts	Tries	Conv	Pens	Drop	Opposition	Venue	Date
1	Pierre Hola	Centre	44	2	17	0	0	South Korea	(Tonga) Nukuʻalofa	22 March 2003
2	Fangatapu Apikotoa	Fly-half	30	2	10	0	0	South Korea	(New Zealand) Henderson	10 February 2007
3	Sateki Tuipulotu	Fullback	27	1	8	2	0	South Korea	(South Korea) Seoul	4 May 1999
4	Benhur Kivalu	Number 8	25	5	0	0	0	South Korea	(Tonga) Nukuʻalofa	22 March 2003
4	Patrick Pellegrini	Fly-half	25	3	5	0	0	Canada	(United States) Salt Lake City	20 September 2025
6	Pierre Hola	Fullback	24	0	9	1	1	Papua New Guinea	(Tonga) Nukuʻalofa	7 December 2002
7	Gustavo Tonga	Fullback	23	1	9	0	0	Cook Islands	(Tonga) Nukuʻalofa	5 July 1997
8	Viliame Iongi	Centre	20	4	0	0	0	United States	(England) Esher	8 June 2011
8	Kurt Morath	Fly-half	20	0	4	4	0	Fiji	(Fiji) Lautoka	2 July 2011
8	Sonatane Takulua	Scrum-half	20	1	3	3	0	Samoa	(Tonga) Nukuʻalofa	1 July 2017

Last updated: Tonga vs Zimbabwe, 4 July 2026. Statistics include officially capped matches only.

=== Most tries in a match ===
#	Player	Pos	Pts	Tries	Conv	Pens	Drop	Opposition	Venue	Date
1	Benhur Kivalu	Number 8	25	5	0	0	0	South Korea	(Tonga) Nukuʻalofa	22 March 2003
2	Viliame Iongi	Wing	20	4	0	0	0	United States	(England) Esher	8 June 2011
3	Josh Taumalolo	Fly-half	15	3	0	0	0	Cook Islands	(Tonga) Nukuʻalofa	5 July 1997
3	Josh Taumalolo	Fullback	17	3	1	0	0	Georgia	(Georgia (country)) Tbilisi	28 March 1999
3	Jonathan Koloi	Flanker	15	3	0	0	0	South Korea	(South Korea) Seoul	4 May 1999
3	Viliami Hakalo	Wing	15	3	0	0	0	Cook Islands	(Cook Islands) Rarotonga	24 June 2006
3	Sonatane Takulua	Scrum-half	15	3	0	0	0	Hong Kong	(Australia) Sunshine Coast	23 July 2022
3	Patrick Pellegrini	Fly-half	25	3	5	0	0	Canada	(United States) Salt Lake City	20 September 2025
9	51 players on 2 tries									

Last updated: Hong Kong vs Tonga, 21 November 2026. Statistics include officially capped matches only.

=== Most matches as captain ===
#	Player	Pos	Span	Mat	Won	Lost	Draw	%	Pts	Tries	Conv	Pens	Drop
1	Nili Latu	Flanker	2006–2016	42	15	26	1	36.90	23	4	0	1	0
2	Sonatane Takulua	Scrum-half	2017–present	21	7	14	0	33.33	85	9	8	8	0
3	Siale Piutau	Wing	2015–2019	19	9	10	0	47.36	22	4	1	0	0
4	Ben Tameifuna	Prop	2024-	13	4	9	0	30.77	15	3	0	0	0
5	Inoke Afeaki	Lock	2001–2003	12	4	8	0	33.33	15	3	0	0	0
6	Fakahau Valu	Flanker	1977–1987	11	0	11	0	0.00	12	3	0	0	0
7	Aleki Lutui	Hooker	2004–2011	9	1	8	0	11.11	5	1	0	0	0
7	Elisi Vunipola	Fly-half	1999–2001	9	4	5	0	44.44	15	3	0	0	0
9	Sione Mafi Pahulu	Number 8	1973–1975	7	1	6	0	14.28	15	3	0	1	0
10	Siaosi Atiola	Number 8	1987–1990	6	1	4	1	25.00	4	1	0	0	0

Last updated: Hong Kong vs Tonga, 21 November 2026. Statistics include officially capped matches only.

=== Youngest players ===
#	Player	Pos	Age	Opposition	Venue	Date
1	Elisi Vunipola	Fly-half	17 years and 292 days	Fiji	(Tonga) Nukualofa	24 March 1990
2	Viliami Hakalo	(Wing)	18 years and 182 days	Japan	(Japan) Fukuoka	4 June 2006
3	Sione Kalamafoni	(Flanker)	18 years and 268 days	South Korea	(New Zealand) Henderson	10 February 2007
4	Soane Havea	Scrum-half	18 years and 292 days	New Zealand	(New Zealand) North Shore City	16 June 2000
5	Semi Taupeaafe	Wing	18 years and 317 days	Fiji	(Fiji) Suva	11 June 1991
6	Sinali Latu	Number 8	18 years and 320 days	Fiji	(Fiji) Suva	7 July 1984
7	Unuoi Vaʻenuku	Centre	19 years and 51 days	France	(South Africa) Pretoria	26 May 1995
8	Pita Alatini	Centre	19 years and 119 days	Samoa	(Tonga) Nukuʻalofa	8 July 1995
9	Tevita ʻAhoafi	(Scrum-half)	19 years and 171 days	Australia A	(Australia) Sydney	25 May 2007
10	Isi Tapueluelu	Centre	19 years and 176 days	Fiji	(Tonga) Nukuʻalofa	24 March 1990

Last updated: Tonga vs Samoa, 22 August 2025. Statistics include officially capped matches only.

=== Oldest players ===
#	Player	Pos	Age	Opposition	Venue	Date
1	Siegfried Fisiʻihoi	Prop	39 years and 170 days	Hong Kong	Hong Kong	21 November 2026
2	Sitaleki Timani	(Lock)	39 years and 73 days	Scotland	(Scotland) Edinburgh	23 November 2025
3	Polutele Tuʻihalamaka	Lock	37 years and 249 days	Canada	(Australia) Napier	24 May 1987
4	Leva Fifita	Lock	37 years and 115 days	Hong Kong	Hong Kong	21 November 2026
5	Aleki Lutui	(Hooker)	37 years and 95 days	Argentina	(England) Leicester	4 October 2015
6	Kurt Morath	Fly-Half	36 years and 358 days	England	(England) London	6 November 2021
7	Fakahau Valu	Flanker	36 years and 347 days	Ireland	(Australia) Brisbane	3 June 1987
8	Joe Tuineau	Lock	36 years and 302 days	Samoa	(Fiji) Suva	16 June 2018
9	Siosiua Moala	Flanker	36 years and 178 days	Scotland	(Scotland) Edinburgh	23 November 2025
10	Hale T-Pole	Lock	36 years and 152 days	Namibia	(England) Exeter	29 September 2015

Last updated: Hong Kong vs Tonga, 21 November 2026. Statistics include officially capped matches only.

== Kit history ==
Tonga usually wears a home kit consisting of a red shirt, white shorts and red socks and an away kit with the reversed colours. In the 1999 Rugby World Cup, Tonga wore an all-red home kit. Since 2007, Tongan traditional designs, similar to the ones found on the tapa cloths, were incorporated on the jersey design.

Kit manufacturers:

Period	Kit manufacturer
1974–1980	Umbro
1980–1999	Canterbury
2000–2002	Carisbrook
2003–2005	Sekem
2005–2008	KooGa
2008	Field to Podium ^a
2008	Samurai Sportswear^a
2008	Samurai Sportswear^a
2008–2010	Aoniu^b
2011–2012	KooGa/BLK
2012–2015	Kukri
2016–2020	Mizuno
2021	Siomai Print
2021-2023	Force XV
2024--present	Talatā Sports Wear

- ^a Tonga wore Samurai Sportswear kits in the matches against Maori All Blacks and Japan in 2008
- ^a Tonga wore Field To Podium kits in the matches during the 2008 Pacific Nations Cup
- ^b Tonga wore kits manufactured by the local brand Aoniu in the 2008 end-of-year international tours.

1987–1995 Home	1987–1995 Away	1999 RWC Home	2003 Home	2003 Away	2007 Home	2009 Home

2011 Home	2015 Home	2015 Away	2017 Home	2017 Away	2019 Home	2019 Away	2023 Home	2023 Away

== Coaches ==
=== Current coaching staff ===
Correct as of 29 August 2026

Position	Name
Head coach	(Tonga) Tevita Tuʻifua
Assistant coach	(Tonga) Nili Latu
Attack coach	(Australia) Daniel Halangahu
Defence coach	(New Zealand) Alando Soakai
Forwards coach	(Tonga) Pauliasi Manu
Technical advisor	(New Zealand) Milton Haig

=== Coaching history ===
Name	Span	Mat	Won	Lost	Draw	%W
(New Zealand) David Mullins	1969–1974					
(Tonga) Viliami Haʻunga	1979					
(Tonga) Kelepi Tupou	1983					
(Tonga) Fred Wolfgramm	1985					
(Tonga) Sione Kite	1986–1987					
(Tonga) Peseti Maʻafu	1991					
(Tonga) Sione Taumoepeau	1994-1995					
(Tonga) Fakahau Valu	1995					
(Tonga) Rev. Tevita Latailakepa	1998					
(Tonga) Polutele Tuʻihalamaka	1999					
(New Zealand) David Waterston	1999–2000					
(Tonga) Vaita Ueleni	2000–2001					
(New Zealand) Jim Love	2001–2003	19	6	13	0	31.58
(Australia) Viliami Ofahengaue	2004–2005	8	0	8	0	0.00
(Australia) Adam Leach	2006–2007	7	5	2	0	71.43
(Tonga) Quddus Fielea	2007–2010	16	5	11	0	31.25
(New Zealand) Isitolo Maka	2010–2011	14	7	7	0	50.00
(Australia) Toutai Kefu (caretaker)	2012	3	1	2	0	33.33
(Tonga) Mana Otai	2012–2015	24	11	12	1	47.91
(Australia) Toutai Kefu	2016–2023	51	15	32	0	29.41
(Tonga) Tevita Tuʻifua	2024–present					

== Notable former players ==
- ʻOtenili Tuʻipulotu
- Inoke Afeaki
- Stanley Afeaki
- Sona Taumalolo
- Ipolito Fenukitau
- Salesi Finau
- Soane Tongaʻuiha
- Taufaʻao Filise
- Aisea Havili
- Pierre Hola
- Benhur Kivalu
- Nili Latu
- Sililo Martens
- Maama Molitika
- Mana Otai
- Siale Piutau
- Hale T-Pole
- Lisiate Tafa
- Epi Taione
- Josh Taumalolo

== See also ==
- Tonga national rugby league team
- Rugby World Cup
- Pacific Tri-Nations
- Pacific Nations Cup
- Pacific Islanders rugby union team
- Tonga Rugby Football Union

== Sources ==
- Tongan rugby history (from the BBC)
- The good and bad of Tonga (from the BBC)
