= 2007 Rugby World Cup Pool B =

Sports competition

External videos
- Rugby World Cup: Dragon Slayers - RWC 2007 Fiji v Wales on YouTube

Pool B of the 2007 Rugby World Cup began on 8 September and was completed on 29 September. The pool was composed of 2003 hosts Australia, as well as Canada, Fiji, Japan and Wales.

Wales' 38–34 loss to Fiji in their final pool game (their third World Cup loss to a Pacific island nation, having previously been beaten 16–13 by Western Samoa in 1991 and 38-31 by Samoa in 1999, both times in Cardiff), meant Fiji qualified for the quarter-finals at Wales' expense. Australia finished in top spot with the maximum of 20 points, while Japan and Canada played out the first draw in a Rugby World Cup game since a 20–20 draw between France and Scotland back in 1987. Neither Japan nor Canada managed to win any of their four games, with a single bonus point in Japan's favour proving the difference between them, after they managed to remain within 7 points of Fiji in a 35–31 defeat.

== Standings ==
Pos	Team	Pld	W	D	L	PF	PA	PD	B	Pts	Qualification
1	Australia	4	4	0	0	215	41	+174	4	20	Qualified for the quarter-finals
2	Fiji	4	3	0	1	114	136	−22	3	15	Qualified for the quarter-finals
3	Wales	4	2	0	2	168	105	+63	4	12	Eliminated, automatic qualification for RWC 2011
4	Japan	4	0	1	3	64	210	−146	1	3	
5	Canada	4	0	1	3	51	120	−69	0	2	

All times local (UTC+2)

== Matches ==
=== Australia vs Japan ===
8 September 2007
15:45

Australia	91–3	Japan
Try: Sharpe 18' m Elsom (3) 24' c, 34' m, 41' c Ashley-Cooper 46' c Latham (2) 53' c, 72' c Barnes (2) 57' c, 75' c Mitchell (2) 59' c, 66' c Smith 62' m Freier 80+' c Con: Mortlock (7/10); Giteau (3/3); Pen: Mortlock (2/2) 10', 16'	Report	Pen: K. Ono (1/1) 38'

Stade de Gerland, Lyon
Attendance: 40,043
Referee: Alan Lewis (Ireland)

FB	15	Chris Latham
RW	14	Adam Ashley-Cooper	(substituted off) 59'
OC	13	Stirling Mortlock (c)	(substituted off) 68'
IC	12	Matt Giteau
LW	11	Lote Tuqiri
FH	10	Stephen Larkham	(substituted off) 54'
SH	9	George Gregan
N8	8	Wycliff Palu	(substituted off) 67'
OF	7	George Smith
BF	6	Rocky Elsom
RL	5	Daniel Vickerman
LL	4	Nathan Sharpe	(substituted off) 51'
TP	3	Al Baxter	(substituted off) 51'	(substituted in) 68'
HK	2	Stephen Moore	(substituted off) 67'
LP	1	Matt Dunning		(substituted off) 68'
Replacements:
HK	16	Adam Freier	(substituted in) 67'
PR	17	Guy Shepherdson	(substituted in) 51'
LK	18	Hugh McMeniman	(substituted in) 51'
N8	19	Stephen Hoiles	(substituted in) 67'
FH	20	Berrick Barnes	(substituted in) 54'
WG	21	Drew Mitchell	(substituted in) 59'
WG	22	Mark Gerrard	(substituted in) 68'
Coach:
(Australia) John Connolly

FB	15	Tatsuya Kusumi
RW	14	Tomoki Kitagawa
OC	13	Koji Taira
IC	12	Nataniela Oto
LW	11	Hirotoki Onozawa
FH	10	Kosei Ono
SH	9	Yuki Yatomi
N8	8	Hajime Kiso
OF	7	Takamichi Sasaki (c)			(substituted off) 48'
BF	6	Yasunori Watanabe	9' to 12'
RL	5	Luatangi Vatuvei
LL	4	Takanori Kumagae
TP	3	Ryo Yamamura
HK	2	Taku Inokuchi
LP	1	Masahito Yamamoto
Replacements:
HK	16	Yuji Matsubara
PR	17	Tomokazu Soma
LK	18	Hitoshi Ono
FL	19	Hare Makiri	(substituted in) 9'	(substituted off) 12'	(substituted in) 48'
SH	20	Tomoki Yoshida
CE	21	Bryce Robins
WG	22	Kosuke Endo
Coach:
(New Zealand) John Kirwan

Man of the Match:
Rocky Elsom (Australia)

Touch judges:
Hugh Watkins (Wales)
Dave Pearson (England)
Television match official:
Malcolm Changleng (Scotland)
Fourth official:
Steve Walsh (New Zealand)
Fifth official:
Laurent Valin (France)

- Australia's starting 15 in this match was the most-experienced starting team in the sport's history, as measured by total number of international caps entering the match. The Wallabies squad that took the field for the opening kickoff had earned a combined total of 798 caps.

=== Wales vs Canada ===
9 September 2007
14:00

Wales	42–17	Canada
Try: Parker 52' c A. W. Jones 58' c S. Williams (2) 61' m, 63' c Charvis 68' c Con: S. Jones (4/5); Pen: Hook (3/4) 10', 15', 21'	Report	Try: Cudmore 25' m Culpan 36' c Williams 45' m Con: Pritchard (1/3)

Stade de la Beaujoire, Nantes
Attendance: 37,500
Referee: Alain Rolland (Ireland)

FB	15	Kevin Morgan	(substituted off) 49'
RW	14	Mark Jones
OC	13	Tom Shanklin
IC	12	Sonny Parker
LW	11	Shane Williams
FH	10	James Hook	(substituted off) 49'
SH	9	Dwayne Peel (c)	(substituted off) 66'
N8	8	Alix Popham
OF	7	Martyn Williams	38' to 41'		(substituted off) 60'
BF	6	Jonathan Thomas
RL	5	Alun Wyn Jones
LL	4	Ian Gough	(substituted off) 65'
TP	3	Adam Jones	(substituted off) 69'
HK	2	Matthew Rees	(substituted off) 69'
LP	1	Gethin Jenkins
Replacements:
HK	16	Rhys Thomas	(substituted in) 69'
PR	17	Duncan Jones	(substituted in) 69'
N8	18	Michael Owen	(substituted in) 65'
FL	19	Colin Charvis	(substituted in) 38'	(substituted off) 41'	(substituted in) 60'
SH	20	Michael Phillips	(substituted in) 66'
FH	21	Stephen Jones	(substituted in) 49'
FB	22	Gareth Thomas	(substituted in) 49'
Coach:
(Wales) Gareth Jenkins

FB	15	Mike Pyke
RW	14	D. T. H. van der Merwe
OC	13	Craig Culpan
IC	12	Dave Spicer
LW	11	James Pritchard
FH	10	Ander Monro	(substituted off) 66'
SH	9	Morgan Williams (c)	(substituted off) 76'
N8	8	Sean-Michael Stephen
OF	7	Dave Biddle	(substituted off) 66'
BF	6	Jamie Cudmore	(substituted off) 61'
RL	5	Mike James
LL	4	Luke Tait	(substituted off) 69'
TP	3	Jon Thiel	(substituted off) 33'
HK	2	Pat Riordan
LP	1	Rod Snow	(substituted off) 57'
Replacements:
HK	16	Aaron Carpenter	(substituted in) 61'
PR	17	Dan Pletch	(substituted in) 57'
PR	18	Mike Pletch	(substituted in) 33'
LK	19	Mike Burak	(substituted in) 69'
FL	20	Colin Yukes	(substituted in) 66'
SH	21	Ed Fairhurst	(substituted in) 76'
FH	22	Ryan Smith	(substituted in) 66'
Coach:
(Canada) Ric Suggitt

Man of the Match:
Morgan Williams (Canada)

Touch judges:
Carlo Damasco (Italy)
Simon McDowell (Ireland)
Television match official:
Kelvin Deaker (New Zealand)
Fourth official:
Tony Spreadbury (England)
Fifth official:
Christophe Dutreuilh (France)

=== Japan vs Fiji ===
12 September 2007
18:00

Japan	31–35	Fiji
Try: Thompson (2) 51' c, 78' c Soma 62' m Con: Onishi (2/3); Pen: Onishi (4/4) 18', 30', 40+', 43'	Report	Try: Qera (2) 36' c, 49' c Rabeni 56' m Leawere 71' c Con: Little (3/4); Pen: Little (3/3) 4', 55', 74'

Stadium de Toulouse, Toulouse
Attendance: 34,500
Referee: Marius Jonker (South Africa)

FB	15	Go Aruga	(substituted off) 60'
RW	14	Christian Loamanu
OC	13	Yuta Imamura
IC	12	Shotaro Onishi
LW	11	Kosuke Endo
FH	10	Bryce Robins
SH	9	Tomoki Yoshida	(substituted off) 58'
N8	8	Takuro Miuchi (c)
OF	7	Philip O'Reilly
BF	6	Hare Makiri
RL	5	Luke Thompson
LL	4	Hitoshi Ono
TP	3	Tomokazu Soma	(substituted off) 68'
HK	2	Yuji Matsubara
LP	1	Tatsukichi Nishiura
Replacements:
HK	16	Taku Inokuchi
PR	17	Ryo Yamamura	(substituted in) 68'
LK	18	Takanori Kumagae
FL	19	Ryota Asano
SH	20	Yuki Yatomi	(substituted in) 58'	(substituted off) 65'
CE	21	Koji Taira		(substituted in) 65'
WG	22	Hirotoki Onozawa	(substituted in) 60'
Coach:
(New Zealand) John Kirwan

FB	15	Kameli Ratuvou		4' to 10'
RW	14	Vilimoni Delasau	(yellow card) 40'			(substituted off) 70'
OC	13	Seru Rabeni
IC	12	Seremaia Bai
LW	11	Isoa Neivua
FH	10	Nicky Little
SH	9	Mosese Rauluni (c)
N8	8	Sisa Koyamaibole		(substituted off) 68'
OF	7	Akapusi Qera		(substituted off) 58'
BF	6	Semisi Naevo
RL	5	Wame Lewaravu
LL	4	Kele Leawere
TP	3	Henry Qiodravu		(substituted off) 68'
HK	2	Sunia Koto
LP	1	Graham Dewes
Replacements:
HK	16	Vereniki Sauturaga
PR	17	Jone Railomo		(substituted in) 68'
FL	18	Netani Talei		(substituted in) 68'
FL	19	Aca Ratuva		(substituted in) 58'
SH	20	Jone Daunivucu
CE	21	Gabiriele Lovobalavu
FB	22	Norman Ligairi		(substituted in) 4'	(substituted off) 10'	(substituted in) 70'
Coach:
(Fiji) Ilie Tabua

Man of the Match:
Akapusi Qera (Fiji)

Touch judges:
Federico Cuesta (Argentina)
Paul Marks (New Zealand)
Television match official:
Malcolm Changleng (Scotland)
Fourth official:
Chris White (England)
Fifth official:
Romain Poite (France)

=== Wales vs Australia ===
15 September 2007
14:00

Wales	20–32	Australia
Try: J. Thomas 45' c S. Williams 76' c Con: Hook (2/2); Pen: S. Jones (1/3) 7'; Hook (1/2) 54'	Report	Try: Giteau 16' c Mortlock 35' m Latham (2) 40+' c, 60' c Con: Mortlock (2/2); Giteau (1/2); Pen: Mortlock (1/2) 2'; Drop: Barnes (1/1) 23'

Millennium Stadium, Cardiff
Attendance: 71,022
Referee: Steve Walsh (New Zealand)

FB	15	Gareth Thomas (c)	(substituted off) 22'
RW	14	Mark Jones
OC	13	Tom Shanklin
IC	12	Sonny Parker	(substituted off) 19'
LW	11	Shane Williams
FH	10	Stephen Jones
SH	9	Dwayne Peel	(substituted off) 71'
N8	8	Jonathan Thomas
OF	7	Martyn Williams
BF	6	Colin Charvis	13' to 16'		49' to 60'
RL	5	Alun Wyn Jones
LL	4	Ian Gough	(substituted off) 66'
TP	3	Adam Jones	(substituted off) 66'
HK	2	Matthew Rees	(substituted off) 66'
LP	1	Gethin Jenkins
Replacements:
HK	16	Rhys Thomas	(substituted in) 66'
PR	17	Duncan Jones	(substituted in) 66'
LK	18	Michael Owen	(substituted in) 66'
N8	19	Alix Popham	(substituted in) 13'	(substituted off) 16'	(substituted in) 49'	(substituted off) 60'
SH	20	Michael Phillips	(substituted in) 71'
FH	21	James Hook	(substituted in) 22'
FB	22	Kevin Morgan	(substituted in) 19'
Coach:
(Wales) Gareth Jenkins

FB	15	Chris Latham
RW	14	Drew Mitchell	(yellow card) 66'
OC	13	Stirling Mortlock (c)		(substituted off) 41'
IC	12	Matt Giteau
LW	11	Lote Tuqiri
FH	10	Berrick Barnes		(substituted off) 78'
SH	9	George Gregan
N8	8	Wycliff Palu		(substituted off) 66'
OF	7	George Smith		(substituted off) 63'
BF	6	Rocky Elsom		(substituted off) 76'
RL	5	Daniel Vickerman
LL	4	Nathan Sharpe	(yellow card) 75'
TP	3	Guy Shepherdson		(substituted off) 74'
HK	2	Stephen Moore		(substituted off) 68'
LP	1	Matt Dunning
Replacements:
HK	16	Adam Freier		(substituted in) 68'
PR	17	Al Baxter		(substituted in) 74'
LK	18	Mark Chisholm		(substituted in) 76'
N8	19	Stephen Hoiles		(substituted in) 66'
FL	20	Phil Waugh		(substituted in) 63'
CE	21	Scott Staniforth		(substituted in) 41'
FB	22	Julian Huxley		(substituted in) 78'
Coach:
(Australia) John Connolly

Man of the Match:
Chris Latham (Australia)

Touch judges:
Mark Lawrence (South Africa)
Craig Joubert (South Africa)
Television match official:
Christophe Berdos (France)
Fourth official:
Tony Spreadbury (England)
Fifth official:
Tim Hayes (Wales)

=== Fiji vs Canada ===
16 September 2007
14:00

Fiji	29–16	Canada
Try: Leawere 22' c Ratuvou (2) 28' m, 80+' c Delasau 42' c Con: Little (3/4); Pen: Little (1/3) 8'	Report	Try: Smith 60' c Con: Pritchard (1/1); Pen: Pritchard (3/4) 4', 27', 74'

Millennium Stadium, Cardiff
Attendance: 45,000
Referee: Tony Spreadbury (England)

FB	15	Kameli Ratuvou
RW	14	Vilimoni Delasau
OC	13	Seru Rabeni	(substituted off) 64'
IC	12	Seremaia Bai
LW	11	Isoa Neivua	(substituted off) 76'
FH	10	Nicky Little
SH	9	Mosese Rauluni (c)
N8	8	Sisa Koyamaibole
OF	7	Akapusi Qera
BF	6	Semisi Naevo	(substituted off) 62'
RL	5	Ifereimi Rawaqa
LL	4	Kele Leawere
TP	3	Jone Railomo	(substituted off) 63'
HK	2	Sunia Koto	(substituted off) 70'
LP	1	Graham Dewes
Replacements:
HK	16	Vereniki Sauturaga	(substituted in) 70'
PR	17	Henry Qiodravu	(substituted in) 63'
FL	18	Netani Talei	(substituted in) 62'
N8	19	Jone Qovu
SH	20	Jone Daunivucu
CE	21	Maleli Kunavore	(substituted in) 64'
FB	22	Norman Ligairi	(substituted in) 76'
Coach:
(Fiji) Ilie Tabua

FB	15	Mike Pyke
RW	14	D. T. H. van der Merwe
OC	13	Craig Culpan
IC	12	Dave Spicer
LW	11	James Pritchard
FH	10	Ryan Smith
SH	9	Morgan Williams (c)
N8	8	Sean-Michael Stephen	(substituted off) 60'
OF	7	Dave Biddle
BF	6	Jamie Cudmore
RL	5	Mike James
LL	4	Mike Burak	(substituted off) 65'
TP	3	Jon Thiel
HK	2	Pat Riordan	(substituted off) 68'
LP	1	Rod Snow	(substituted off) 62'
Replacements:
HK	16	Aaron Carpenter	(substituted in) 68'
PR	17	Dan Pletch	(substituted in) 62'
PR	18	Mike Pletch
LK	19	Luke Tait	(substituted in) 65'
FL	20	Colin Yukes	(substituted in) 60'
SH	21	Ed Fairhurst
FH	22	Ander Monro
Coach:
(Canada) Ric Suggitt

Man of the Match:
Kameli Ratuvou (Fiji)

Touch judges:
Christophe Berdos (France)
Mark Lawrence (South Africa)
Television match official:
Craig Joubert (South Africa)
Fourth official:
Joël Jutge (France)
Fifth official:
Tim Hayes (Wales)

=== Wales vs Japan ===
20 September 2007
21:00

Wales	72–18	Japan
Try: A. W. Jones 11' c Hook 24' c R. Thomas 31' c Morgan 40+' m Phillips 42' c S. Williams (2) 48' m, 80' m D. James 52' c Cooper 59' c M. Williams (2) 64' c, 74' c Con: S. Jones (5/7); Sweeney (2/4); Pen: S. Jones (1/1) 23'	Report	Try: Endo 19' m Onozawa 57' c Con: Robins (1/1); Pen: Onishi (2/2) 4', 37'

Millennium Stadium, Cardiff
Attendance: 35,245
Referee: Joël Jutge (France)

FB	15	Kevin Morgan
RW	14	Dafydd James
OC	13	Jamie Robinson	(substituted off) 73'
IC	12	James Hook
LW	11	Shane Williams
FH	10	Stephen Jones (c)	(substituted off) 57'
SH	9	Michael Phillips	(substituted off) 57'
N8	8	Alix Popham	(substituted off) 58'
OF	7	Martyn Williams
BF	6	Colin Charvis
RL	5	Alun Wyn Jones	(substituted off) 52'
LL	4	Will James
TP	3	Chris Horsman	(substituted off) 65'
HK	2	Rhys Thomas	(substituted off) 59'
LP	1	Duncan Jones
Replacements:
HK	16	Huw Bennett	(substituted in) 69'
PR	17	Gethin Jenkins	(substituted in) 65'
LK	18	Ian Evans	(substituted in) 52'
N8	19	Michael Owen	(substituted in) 58'
SH	20	Gareth Cooper	(substituted in) 57'
FH	21	Ceri Sweeney	(substituted in) 57'
CE	22	Tom Shanklin	(substituted in) 73'
Coach:
(Wales) Gareth Jenkins

FB	15	Christian Loamanu
RW	14	Kosuke Endo
OC	13	Yuta Imamura	(substituted off) 51'
IC	12	Shotaro Onishi	(substituted off) 52'
LW	11	Hirotoki Onozawa
FH	10	Bryce Robins
SH	9	Tomoki Yoshida	(substituted off) 66'
N8	8	Takuro Miuchi (c)
OF	7	Hare Makiri	(substituted off) 52'
BF	6	Yasunori Watanabe
RL	5	Luke Thompson	(substituted off) 66'
LL	4	Hitoshi Ono
TP	3	Tomokazu Soma		(substituted off) 71'
HK	2	Yuji Matsubara	(substituted off) 74'
LP	1	Tatsukichi Nishiura	(substituted off) 53'	(substituted in) 71'
Replacements:
HK	16	Taku Inokuchi	(substituted in) 74'
PR	17	Ryo Yamamura	(substituted in) 53'
LK	18	Hajime Kiso	(substituted in) 66'
FL	19	Ryota Asano	(substituted in) 52'
SH	20	Chulwon Kim	(substituted in) 66'
CE	21	Koji Taira	(substituted in) 51'
FB	22	Tatsuya Kusumi	(substituted in) 52'
Coach:
(New Zealand) John Kirwan

Man of the Match:
Michael Phillips (Wales)

Touch judges:
Mark Lawrence (South Africa)
Craig Joubert (South Africa)
Television match official:
Christophe Berdos (France)
Fourth official:
Nigel Owens (Wales)
Fifth official:
Tim Hayes (Wales)

=== Australia vs Fiji ===
23 September 2007
14:30

Australia	55–12	Fiji
Try: Giteau (2) 17' c, 36' m Mitchell (3) 31' c, 70' c, 79' m Ashley-Cooper 57' c Hoiles 74' m Con: Giteau (4/6); Pen: Giteau (3/3) 28', 42', 50'; Drop: Barnes (1/1) 44'	Report	Try: Neivua 40+' m Ratuva 47' c Con: Bai (1/1)

Stade de la Mosson, Montpellier
Attendance: 32,231
Referee: Nigel Owens (Wales)

FB	15	Chris Latham
RW	14	Drew Mitchell
OC	13	Adam Ashley-Cooper
IC	12	Matt Giteau
LW	11	Lote Tuqiri
FH	10	Berrick Barnes	(substituted off) 62'
SH	9	George Gregan (c)	(substituted off) 58'
N8	8	Wycliff Palu	(substituted off) 66'
OF	7	Phil Waugh
BF	6	Rocky Elsom	(substituted off) 58'
RL	5	Daniel Vickerman
LL	4	Mark Chisholm
TP	3	Guy Shepherdson
HK	2	Stephen Moore	(substituted off) 58'
LP	1	Matt Dunning	(substituted off) 58'
Replacements:
HK	16	Adam Freier	(substituted in) 58'
PR	17	Greg Holmes	(substituted in) 58'
LK	18	Hugh McMeniman	(substituted in) 58'
N8	19	Stephen Hoiles	(substituted in) 66'
SH	20	Sam Cordingley	(substituted in) 58'
CE	21	Scott Staniforth	(substituted in) 62'	(substituted off) 68'
FB	22	Julian Huxley		(substituted in) 68'
Coach:
(Australia) John Connolly

FB	15	Norman Ligairi
RW	14	Vilimoni Delasau
OC	13	Maleli Kunavore	(substituted off) 65'
IC	12	Seremaia Bai (c)
LW	11	Isoa Neivua
FH	10	Waisea Luveniyali	(substituted off) 41'
SH	9	Jone Daunivucu	(substituted off) 41'
N8	8	Jone Qovu
OF	7	Aca Ratuva
BF	6	Netani Talei	(substituted off) 63'
RL	5	Ifereimi Rawaqa
LL	4	Isoa Domolailai	(substituted off) 41'
TP	3	Henry Qiodravu
HK	2	Vereniki Sauturaga
LP	1	Alefoso Yalayalatabua	(substituted off) 60'
Replacements:
HK	16	Bill Gadolo
PR	17	Jone Railomo	(substituted in) 60'
LK	18	Wame Lewaravu	(substituted in) 41'
N8	19	Sisa Koyamaibole	(substituted in) 63'
SH	20	Mosese Rauluni	(substituted in) 41'
CE	21	Gabiriele Lovobalavu	(substituted in) 65'
CE	22	Seru Rabeni	(substituted in) 41'
Coach:
(Fiji) Ilie Tabua

Man of the Match:
Matt Giteau (Australia)

Touch judges:
Mark Lawrence (South Africa)
Christophe Berdos (France)
Television match official:
Craig Joubert (South Africa)
Fourth official:
Romain Poite (France)
Fifth official:
Jean-Christophe Gastou (France)

=== Canada vs Japan ===
25 September 2007
18:00

Canada	12–12	Japan
Try: Riordan 48' m Van der Merwe 65' c Con: Pritchard (1/2)	Report	Try: Endo 12' m Taira 80+' c Con: Onishi (1/2)

Stade Chaban-Delmas, Bordeaux
Attendance: 33,810
Referee: Jonathan Kaplan (South Africa)

FB	15	Mike Pyke
RW	14	D. T. H. van der Merwe
OC	13	Craig Culpan		(substituted off) 72'
IC	12	Dave Spicer
LW	11	James Pritchard
FH	10	Ryan Smith
SH	9	Morgan Williams (c)
N8	8	Aaron Carpenter		(substituted off) 56'
OF	7	Adam Kleeberger		(substituted off) 79'
BF	6	Colin Yukes
RL	5	Mike James
LL	4	Mike Burak
TP	3	Jon Thiel		(substituted off) 58'
HK	2	Pat Riordan	(yellow card) 35'	(substituted off) 60'
LP	1	Rod Snow		(substituted off) 46'
Replacements:
PR	16	Mike Pletch		(substituted in) 60'
PR	17	Dan Pletch		(substituted in) 46'
PR	18	Scott Franklin		(substituted in) 58'
LK	19	Josh Jackson		(substituted in) 79'
FL	20	Mike Webb		(substituted in) 56'
SH	21	Ed Fairhurst
WG	22	Justin Mensah-Coker		(substituted in) 72'
Coach:
(Canada) Ric Suggitt

FB	15	Go Aruga
RW	14	Kosuke Endo	(substituted off) 72'
OC	13	Yuta Imamura	(substituted off) 69'
IC	12	Shotaro Onishi
LW	11	Christian Loamanu
FH	10	Bryce Robins
SH	9	Tomoki Yoshida	(substituted off) 50'
N8	8	Takuro Miuchi (c)	(substituted off) 72'
OF	7	Philip O'Reilly
BF	6	Hare Makiri
RL	5	Luke Thompson
LL	4	Hitoshi Ono	(substituted off) 56'
TP	3	Tomokazu Soma	(substituted off) 52'	(substituted in) 75'
HK	2	Yuji Matsubara
LP	1	Tatsukichi Nishiura		(substituted off) 75'
Replacements:
HK	16	Taku Inokuchi
PR	17	Ryo Yamamura	(substituted in) 52'
LK	18	Luatangi Vatuvei	(substituted in) 56'
FL	19	Hajime Kiso	(substituted in) 72'
SH	20	Chulwon Kim	(substituted in) 50'
CE	21	Koji Taira	(substituted in) 69'
FB	22	Hirotoki Onozawa	(substituted in) 72'
Coach:
(New Zealand) John Kirwan

Man of the Match:
Morgan Williams (Canada)

Touch judges:
Lyndon Bray (New Zealand)
Bryce Lawrence (New Zealand)
Television match official:
Joël Jutge (France)
Fourth official:
Alain Rolland (Ireland)
Fifth official:
Hervé Dubes (France)

=== Australia vs Canada ===
29 September 2007
15:00

Australia	37–6	Canada
Try: Baxter 24' m Freier 34' m Smith 51' m Mitchell (2) 63' c, 65' m Latham 73' c Con: Shepherd (2/3); Pen: Huxley (1/1) 2'	Report	Pen: Pritchard (2/2) 42', 54'

Stade Chaban-Delmas, Bordeaux
Attendance: 35,200
Referee: Chris White (England)

FB	15	Chris Latham
RW	14	Cameron Shepherd
OC	13	Lote Tuqiri
IC	12	Adam Ashley-Cooper
LW	11	Drew Mitchell
FH	10	Julian Huxley
SH	9	Sam Cordingley	(substituted off) 74'
N8	8	David Lyons	(substituted off) 46'
OF	7	George Smith (c)
BF	6	Hugh McMeniman
RL	5	Mark Chisholm
LL	4	Nathan Sharpe	(substituted off) 72'
TP	3	Al Baxter
HK	2	Adam Freier	(substituted off) 60'
LP	1	Greg Holmes
Replacements:
HK	16	Sean Hardman	(substituted in) 60'
PR	17	Guy Shepherdson
FL	18	Rocky Elsom
FL	19	Phil Waugh	(substituted in) 72'
N8	20	Stephen Hoiles	(substituted in) 46'
SH	21	George Gregan	(substituted in) 74'
CE	22	Matt Giteau
Coach:
(Australia) John Connolly

FB	15	D. T. H. van der Merwe	(substituted off) 75'
RW	14	Justin Mensah-Coker
OC	13	Mike Pyke
IC	12	Derek Daypuck	(substituted off) 67'
LW	11	James Pritchard
FH	10	Ander Monro
SH	9	Morgan Williams (c)
N8	8	Sean-Michael Stephen	(substituted off) 54'
OF	7	Dave Biddle
BF	6	Colin Yukes	(substituted off) 64'
RL	5	Mike James	(substituted off) 64'
LL	4	Luke Tait
TP	3	Jon Thiel
HK	2	Pat Riordan	(substituted off) 46'
LP	1	Rod Snow	(substituted off) 54'	(substituted in) 73'
Replacements:
HK	16	Aaron Carpenter	(substituted in) 46'
PR	17	Dan Pletch	(substituted in) 54'	(substituted off) 73'
PR	18	Mike Pletch	(substituted in) 64'
LK	19	Mike Burak	(substituted in) 64'
FL	20	Mike Webb	(substituted in) 54'
SH	21	Ed Fairhurst	(substituted in) 75'
CE	22	Nick Trenkel	(substituted in) 67'
Coach:
(Canada) Ric Suggitt

Man of the Match:
Hugh McMeniman (Australia)

Touch judges:
Steve Walsh (New Zealand)
Bryce Lawrence (New Zealand)
Television match official:
Lyndon Bray (New Zealand)
Fourth official:
Marius Jonker (South Africa)
Fifth official:
Stephan Pomarede (France)

=== Wales vs Fiji ===
29 September 2007
17:00

Wales	34–38	Fiji
Try: Popham 34' c S. Williams 45' c G. Thomas 48' m M. Jones 51' c M. Williams 73' m Con: Hook (1/1); S. Jones (2/4); Pen: S. Jones (1/2) 5'	Report	Try: Qera 16' c Delasau 19' m Leawere 25' c Dewes 77' c Con: Little (3/4); Pen: Little (4/5) 21', 24', 54', 60'

Stade de la Beaujoire, Nantes
Attendance: 37,080
Referee: Stuart Dickinson (Australia)

FB	15	Gareth Thomas (c)
RW	14	Mark Jones
OC	13	Tom Shanklin
IC	12	James Hook
LW	11	Shane Williams
FH	10	Stephen Jones
SH	9	Dwayne Peel	(substituted off) 58'
N8	8	Alix Popham	(substituted off) 65'
OF	7	Martyn Williams
BF	6	Colin Charvis
RL	5	Ian Evans	(substituted off) 65'
LL	4	Alun Wyn Jones
TP	3	Chris Horsman	(substituted off) 65'
HK	2	Matthew Rees	(substituted off) 47'
LP	1	Gethin Jenkins
Replacements:
HK	16	Rhys Thomas	(substituted in) 47'
PR	17	Duncan Jones	(substituted in) 65'
LK	18	Ian Gough	(substituted in) 65'
N8	19	Michael Owen	(substituted in) 65'
SH	20	Michael Phillips	(substituted in) 58'
CE	21	Jamie Robinson
WG	22	Dafydd James
Coach:
(Wales) Gareth Jenkins

FB	15	Kameli Ratuvou
RW	14	Vilimoni Delasau
OC	13	Seru Rabeni		(substituted off) 67'
IC	12	Seremaia Bai
LW	11	Isoa Neivua		(substituted off) 52'
FH	10	Nicky Little		(substituted off) 80+'
SH	9	Mosese Rauluni (c)
N8	8	Sisa Koyamaibole
OF	7	Akapusi Qera	(yellow card) 40'	(substituted off) 74'
BF	6	Semisi Naevo
RL	5	Ifereimi Rawaqa
LL	4	Kele Leawere
TP	3	Jone Railomo		(substituted off) 54'
HK	2	Sunia Koto		(substituted off) 77'
LP	1	Graham Dewes
Replacements:
HK	16	Vereniki Sauturaga		(substituted in) 77'
PR	17	Henry Qiodravu		(substituted in) 54'
LK	18	Wame Lewaravu
FL	19	Aca Ratuva		(substituted in) 74'
SH	20	Jone Daunivucu		(substituted in) 80+'
FB	21	Norman Ligairi		(substituted in) 67'
WG	22	Sereli Bobo		(substituted in) 52'
Coach:
(Fiji) Ilie Tabua

Man of the Match:
Shane Williams (Wales)

Touch judges:
Kelvin Deaker (New Zealand)
Simon McDowell (Ireland)
Television match official:
Carlo Damasco (Italy)
Fourth official:
Alain Rolland (Ireland)
Fifth official:
Christophe Dutreuilh (France)
