= 2006 Canada rugby union tour of Europe =

Summary
P	W	D	L
Total
2	0	0	2
Test match
2	0	0	2
Opponent
P	W	D	L
Wales
1	0	0	1
Italy
1	0	0	1

The 2006 Canada rugby union tour of Europe was a series of matches played in November 2006 in Wales and Italy by Canada national rugby union team.

== Results ==
17 November 2006

Wales	61–26	Canada
Try: Peel, Rees, Shanklin; Sweeney, G Thomas; J. Thomas 2 S. Williams, Penalty try Con: Hook 8		Try: D.Pletch, Pyke; Con: Pritchard 2 Pen: Pritchard 3 Drop: Daypuck

Millennium, Cardiff
Attendance: 74,000
Referee: Tony Spreadbury (England)

Wales			Canada
(capt.) Gareth Thomas	FB	15	FB	Ed Fairhurst
Mark Jones	W	14	W	Mike Pyke
Tom Shanklin	C	13	C	Ryan Smith
Sonny Parker	C	12	C	Dave Spicer
Shane Williams	W	11	W	James Pritchard
James Hook	FH	10	FH	Derek Daypuck
Dwayne Peel	SH	9	SH	Morgan Williams (capt.)
Ryan Jones	N8	8	N8	Sean-Michael Stephen
Martyn Williams	F	7	F	Stan McKeen
Jonathan Thomas	F	6	F	Mike Webb
Ian Evans	L	5	L	Mike Burak
Ian Gough	L	4	L	Luke Tait
Adam Jones	P	3	P	Forrest Gainer
Matthew Rees	H	2	H	Mark Lawson
Gethin Jenkins	P	1	P	Kevin Tkachuk
		Replacements
(substituted on) T. Rhys Thomas	H	16	H	Pat Riordan (substituted on)
(substituted on) Duncan Jones	P	17	P	Dan Pletch (substituted on)
(substituted on) Robert Sidoli	L	18	P	Mike Pletch (substituted on)
(substituted on) Alun Wyn Jones	L	19	L	Stu Ault (substituted on)
(substituted on) Mike Phillips	SH	20	BR	Aaron Carpenter (substituted on)
(substituted on) Ceri Sweeney	C	21	FH	Ander Monro (substituted on)
Lee Byrne		22	W	Justin Mensah-Coker (substituted on)
		Coaches
(Canada) Ric Suggitt				Gareth Jenkins (Wales)

25 November 2006

Italy	41–6	Canada
Try: Bortolami, Castrogiovanni; Stanojevic 2, Zanni; Con: Bortolussi 5 Pen: Bortolussi 2		Pen: Monro 2

Fontanafredda
Attendance: 7,000
Referee: Marius Jonker (South Africa)

Italy			Canada
David Bortolussi	FB	15	FB	Ed Fairhurst
Warren Spragg	W	14	W	Mike Pyke
Mirco Bergamasco	C	13	C	Ryan Smith
Walter Pozzebon	C	12	C	Derek Daypuck
(yellow card) Marko Stanojevic	W	11	W	Justin Mensah-Coker
Andrea Scanavacca	FH	10	FH	Ander Monro
Paul Griffen	SH	9	SH	Morgan Williams (capt.)
Sergio Parisse	N8	8	N8	Aaron Carpenter
Mauro Bergamasco	F	7	F	Stan McKeen
Josh Sole	F	6	F	Mike Webb
(capt.) Marco Bortolami	L	5	L	Ollie Atkinson
Santiago Dellapè	L	4	L	Luke Tait
Carlos Nieto	P	3	P	Forrest Gainer (yellow card)
Fabio Ongaro	H	2	H	Pat Riordan
Andrea Lo Cicero	P	1	P	Dan Pletch
		Replacements
(substituted on) (yellow card) Carlo Festuccia	H	16	H	Aaron Abrams (substituted on)
(substituted on) Martin Castrogiovanni	P	17	P	Kevin Tkachuk (substituted on)
(substituted on) Alessandro Zanni	F	18	P	Mike Pletch (substituted on)
(substituted on) Maurizio Zaffiri	F	19	L	Stu Ault (substituted on)
(substituted on) Simon Picone	SH	20	F	Adam Kleeberger (substituted on)
Ramiro Pez	FH	21	FH	Dean van Camp (substituted on)
(substituted on) Gonzalo Canale	C	22	W	D. T. H. van der Merwe (substituted on)
		Coaches
(Canada) Ric Suggitt				Pierre Berbizier (France)
