= 2007 Canada rugby union tour of New Zealand =

Summary
P	W	D	L
Total
2	1	0	1
Test match
1	0	0	1
Opponent
P	W	D	L
New Zealand
1	0	0	1

The 2007 Canada rugby union tour of New Zealand was a series of matches played in June 2007 in New Zealand by the Canada national rugby union team.

== Results ==
16 June 2007

New Zealand	64–13	Canada
Try: Carter 3, Gear; Hore, Howlett; McAlister, Masoe; Schwalger, Sivivatu; Con: Carter 7	report	Try: Pyke; Con: Pritchard; Pen: Pritchard 2

Waikato Stadium, Hamilton
Attendance: 25,000
Referee: Christophe Berdos (France)

New Zealand			Canada
Mils Muliaina	FB	15	FB	Mike Pyke
Doug Howlett	W	14	W	Justin Mensah-Coker
Luke McAlister	C	13	C	Craig Culpan
Aaron Mauger	C	12	C	Dave Spicer
Sitiveni Sivivatu	W	11	W	James Pritchard
Dan Carter	FH	10	FH	Ryan Smith
Byron Kelleher	SH	9	SH	Morgan Williams (capt.)
Jerry Collins	N8	8	N8	Sean-Michael Stephen
Chris Masoe	F	7	F	Stan McKeen
(capt.) Reuben Thorne	F	6	F	Colin Yukes
Ross Filipo	L	5	L	Mike Burak
Troy Flavell	L	4	L	Luke Tait
Neemia Tialata	P	3	P	Scott Franklin
Andrew Hore	H	2	H	Pat Riordan
John Schwalger	P	1	P	Kevin Tkachuk
		Replacements
Keven Mealamu		16	F	Aaron Carpenter (substituted on)
Carl Hayman		17	P	Dan Pletch (substituted on)
Rodney So'oialo		18	P	Mike Pletch (substituted on)
(substituted on) Richie McCaw	L	19	L	Josh Jackson (substituted on)
(substituted on) Piri Weepu	SH	20	F	Adam Kleeberger (substituted on)
(substituted on) Rico Gear	C	21	C	Dean van Camp (substituted on)
(substituted on) Leon MacDonald	FB	22	SH	Ed Fairhurst (substituted on)
		Coaches
(New Zealand) Graham Henry

22 June 2007

New Zealand U.21	13–16	Canada XV

Rotorua
