= 2007 Rugby World Cup warm-up matches =

Throughout August 2007, various teams prepared for the Rugby World Cup in France with a short series of test matches, primarily in the Northern Hemisphere and involving the RBS Six Nations sides. In addition, South Africa played one test in Scotland following the 2007 Tri Nations and Argentina one test in their home country and one in Wales. The tests were effectively a replacement for the usual Autumn international series in November which does not take place in World Cup years.

Note: this article does not include international results not involving at least one side who had qualified for the 2007 World Cup.

== Saturday, 21 July ==
21 July 2007

Namibia XV	42–34	South Africa Amateurs
	Report

H. Geingob Stadium, Windhoek

== Saturday, 28 July ==
28 July 2007

Namibia XV	20–32	South Africa Universities
	Report

H. Geingob Stadium, Windoheck

28 July 2007

Portugal XV	16–19	London Welsh
	Report

Vilamoura

== Thursday, 2 August ==
2 August 2007

Romania XV	53–0	Romania Amateurs

Bucharest

== Saturday, 4 August ==
4 August 2007
16:00 BST

England	62–5	Wales
Tries: Easter (4) 14' m, 20' c, 46' c, 50' c Borthwick 30' c Dallaglio 66' c Perry 74' c Robinson 78' m Tait 80+1' c Con: Wilkinson (7); Pen: Wilkinson 34'	(Report)	Try: D. James 59' m

Twickenham Stadium, London
Referee: Joël Jutge (France)

4 August 2007

Argentina XV	70–14	Chile XV
Tries: Serra (2) 8' c, 57' c Longo 29' c J. Fernández Lobbe (2) 33' c, 45' c M. Contepomi 38' c F. Contepomi 50' c Bosch 55' c Gaitán 68' c Scelzo 79' c Con: F. Contepomi (10)	(Report)	Try: Berti 3' c, 17' c Con: Berti (2)

CASI, Buenos Aires
Referee: Santiago Slinger (Uruguay)

4 August 2007

Portugal XV	22–20	Coventry

Vilamoura

== Monday, 6 August ==
6 August 2007

Auch	20–17	Georgia XV

Auch

== Friday, 10 August ==
10 August 2007

Japan XV	69–10	Asian Barbarians
	Report

Chichibu, Tokyo

== Saturday, 11 August ==
11 August 2007

England	15–21	France
Pen: Barkley (4) 9', 22', 32', 39'; Drop: Gomarsall 56'	(Report)	Try: Pelous 11' m Chabal 70' c Con: Élissalde; Pen: Skrela (2) 16', 35'; Élissalde 60'

Twickenham, London
Attendance: 63,251
Referee: Alan Lewis (Ireland)

- In this match, Fabien Pelous equalled Philippe Sella for most caps for France, with 111.

11 August 2007

Scotland	31–21	Ireland
Try: Hogg 5' c Henderson (3) 12' c, 46' m, 75' c E. Murray 19' m Con: Paterson (2); Parks	(Report)	Try: Boss 48' c Trimble 55' m Con: P. Wallace; Pen: P. Wallace (2) 10', 59'; Murphy 27'

Murrayfield, Edinburgh
Attendance: 25,127
Referee: Tony Spreadbury (England)

11 August 2007

British Columbia	3–38	Canada XV
	report

11 August 2007

Neath RFC	10–41	Romania XV

The Gnoll, Neath

11 August 2007

Agen Espoirs	17–6	Georgia XV
	Report

Pont-du-Casse

11 August 2007

Canada Inv. XV	34–18	Portugal XV

Fletcher's Field, Toronto

== Tuesday, 14 August ==
14 August 2007

Agen	31–13	Georgia XV

Sainte-Livrade

14 August 2007

Auckland A	31–13	Tonga XV

Sainte-Livrade

== Wednesday, 15 August ==
15 August 2007

South Africa	105–13	Namibia
Try: de Villiers 11'; Smith (3) 18', 34', 70'; Pietersen 22'; Burger (3) 29', 56', 77'; Fourie 39' du Randt 46'; Montgomery 50'; Willemse 63' du Plessis 73'; Pienaar 80' van der Linde 80'; Con: Montgomery (12); Pen: Montgomery (2)	(Report)	Try: Langenhoven 8'c Con: Wessels; Pen: Wessels (2)

Newlands Stadium, Cape Town
Referee: Jonathan Kaplan (South Africa)

== Thursday, 16 August ==
16 August 2007

Bayonne	6–42	Ireland XV
	Report

Bayonne

== Friday 17 August ==
17 August 2007

Harlequins	22–21	Samoa XV

The Stoop, London

== Saturday, 18 August ==
18 August 2007

Canada	42–12	Portugal
Try: Pyke; Kleeberger; Van der Merwe (2); Mensah-Coker; Spicer; Con: Pritchard (3); Pen: Pritchard (2)	Report	Try: Mateus; J. Pinto; Con: Leal

Twin Elm Rugby Park, Ottawa

18 August 2007

France	22–9	England
Try: Jauzion 48' c Con: Élissalde; Pen: Élissalde (4); Michalak	(Report)	Pen:Wilkinson (3)

Stade Vélodrome, Marseille
Referee: Alain Rolland (Ireland)

- Fabien Pelous set a new France record with his 112th cap.

18 August 2007

Italy	36–12	Japan
Try: Stanojevic (2) 6' m, 10' c Robertson 20' c Lo Cicero 68' c Mauro Bergamasco 80' c Con: Bortolussi (4); Pen: Bortolussi 3'	(Report)	Try: Nishiura 26' c Makiri 57' m Con: Ando

Stadio Perruca, Aosta
Attendance: 4,700
Referee: Dave Pearson (England)

18 August 2007

Wales	27–20	Argentina
Try: G. Thomas 9' c A. W. Jones 22' c M. Jones 25' c Con: Hook (3); Pen: Hook (2)	(Report)	Try: Corleto (2) 4' c, 51' c Con: Todeschini (2); Pen: Todeschini (2)

Millennium Stadium, Cardiff
Attendance: 38,284
Referee: Chris White (England)

18 August 2007

Albi	24–13	Georgia XV
	(Report)

Albi

== Sunday, 19 August ==
19 August 2007

Northampton Saints	21–24	Samoa XV
	Report

Northampton

== Tuesday 21 August ==
21 August 2007

Connacht	3–18	South Africa XV
	Report

Sportsgrounds, Galway

== Friday, 24 August ==
24 August 2007

Ireland	23–20	Italy
Try: Trimble 27' c O'Gara 80+9' c Con: O'Gara (2); Pen: O'Gara (2) 6', 47'; Drop: O'Gara 78'	(Report)	Try: Troncon 38' c Pratichetti 80+3' c Con: Bortolussi de Marigny; Pen: Bortolussi 33'; Drop: Bortolussi 22'

Ravenhill, Belfast
Attendance: 14,100
Referee: Nigel Owens (Wales)

24 August 2007

Sale Sharks	7–26	Samoa XV

Sale

24 August 2007

Edinburgh	14–26	Tonga XV

Edinburgh

== Saturday, 25 August ==
25 August 2007

Scotland	3–27	South Africa
Pen: Paterson 10'	(Report)	Try: Habana 22' c Fourie 26' c du Preez 28' c Con: Montgomery (3); Pen: Montgomery (2) 13', 52'

Murrayfield, Edinburgh
Attendance: 30,342
Referee: Christophe Berdos (France)

25 August 2007

Portugal	13 – 15	Japan XV
Try: Diogo Mateus c Con: Duarte Pinto; Pen: Malheiro; Drop: Malheiro	Report	Try: Watanabe 8' m Asano 72' c Con: Robins; Pen: Ono 1'

Stadio Comunale, Mogliano Veneto
Referee: Giulio De Santis (Italy)

- Japan wing Daisuke Ohata, the all-time world leader in international tries, was injured and was ruled out of the World Cup after he tore his left Achilles tendon in the match.

25 August 2007

Auch	13–7	Georgia XV

Auch

25 August 2007

Belgium Invitational XV	8–36	Argentina XV

Brussels

25 August 2007

Eastern Canada	10–40	Canada XV

25 August 2007

Albi	24–49	Fiji XV

Albi

25 August 2007

United States	6–10	Munster

Toyota Park, Bridgeview
Attendance: 8,260

== Sunday, 26 August ==
26 August 2007

Wales	7–34	France
Try: Hook 40' c Con: Hook	(Report)	Try: Thion 13' c Mignoni 32' c Rougerie 56' c Bruno 80' c Con: Beauxis (3); Élissalde; Pen: Beauxis (2)

Millennium Stadium, Cardiff
Attendance: 49,655
Referee: Wayne Barnes (England)
