= 2007 June rugby union tests =

International sporting competitions

The 2007 mid-year rugby union tests (also known as the Summer Internationals in the Northern Hemisphere) refers to the Rugby union Test matches played during June and May 2007. These are played in the Southern Hemisphere and include all Tests hosted by Argentina, Australia, New Zealand, and South Africa outside the 2007 Tri-Nations. The Tests are being used by many countries as their last opportunity to prepare for the 2007 Rugby World Cup in France. For Australia, New Zealand and South Africa it is used as preparation for the 2007 Tri-Nations. The only match listed here with a Northern Hemisphere winner was Italy's victory over Uruguay.

== Overview ==
=== Series ===
Tour	Result	Winner
South Africa v England test series	2–0	South Africa
Australia v Wales test series	2–0	Australia
Argentina v Ireland test series	2–0	Argentina
New Zealand v France test series	2–0	New Zealand

=== Other tours ===
Team/Tour	Opponents
Barbarians tour	Tunisia (W) – Spain (W)
Italian tour	Uruguay (W) – Argentina (L)
Canadian tour	New Zealand (L)

== Fixtures ==
19 May 2007
13:00 CEST UTC+2)

Tunisia	10–33	Barbarians

Stade El Menzah, Tunis

23 May 2007
13:00 CEST UTC+2)

Spain	26–52	Barbarians

Estadio Manuel Martínez Valero, Elche

26 May 2007
16:10 AST (UTC−3)

Argentina	22–20	Ireland
Try: Senillosa c Con: F. Contepomi; Pen: F. Contepomi (4); Drop: F. Contepomi		Try: Carney c Penalty try c Con: Wallace (2); Pen: Wallace; Duffy

Estadio B. G. Estanislao López, Santa Fe
Attendance: 26,000
Referee: Lyndon Bray (New Zealand)

26 May 2007
20:00 AEST (UTC+10)

Australia	29–23	Wales
Try: Palu 23' m Sharpe 31' c Giteau 53' c Hoiles 80' c Con: Mortlock (3); Pen: Mortlock 61'		Try: G. Thomas 1' c J. Robinson 14' c Con: Hook (2); Pen: Hook (2) 19', 51'; Drop: Hook 72'

Telstra Stadium, Sydney
Attendance: 40,872
Referee: Jonathan Kaplan (South Africa)

26 May 2007
15:00 SAST (UTC+2)

South Africa	58–10	England
Try: Willemse 24' c Habana (2) 25' c, 75' c De Villiers 38' c Burger 70' c Steyn 73' c Van der Linde 78' c Con: Montgomery (7); Pen: Montgomery (3) 2', 16', 35'		Try: Simpson-Daniel 62' c Con: Wilkinson; Pen: Wilkinson 29'

Free State Stadium, Bloemfontein
Attendance: 36,500
Referee: Steve Walsh (New Zealand)

2 June 2007
16:10 AST (UTC−3)

Argentina	16–0	Ireland
Try: M. Contepomi c Con: Todeschini; Pen: Todeschini (3)

José Amalfitani Stadium, Buenos Aires
Attendance: 40,000
Referee: Kelvin Deaker (New Zealand)

2 June 2007
20:00 AEST (UTC+10)

Australia	31–0	Wales
Try: Ioane m Mitchell c Huxley c Con: Mortlock (2); Pen: Mortlock (4)

Lang Park, Brisbane
Attendance: 41,622
Referee: Paul Honiss (New Zealand)

2 June 2007
09:35 NZST (UTC+12)

New Zealand	42–11	France
Try: Mauger (2) c, c Sivivatu (2) c, m So'oialo c Con: Carter; Weepu; Evans (2); Pen: Carter; Weepu; Evans		Try: Coux m Pen: Boyet (2)

Eden Park, Auckland
Attendance: 41,500
Referee: Stuart Dickinson (Australia)

2 June 2007
15:00 SAST (UTC+2)

South Africa	55–22	England
Try: Januarie 22' c Burger 30' c Botha 43' m Spies (2) 52' m, 77' c Habana (2) 54' c, 75' c Montgomery 65' c Con: Montgomery (5); James; Pen: Montgomery		Try: Scarborough 40' c Con: Wilkinson; Pen: Wilkinson (5)

Loftus Versfeld Stadium, Pretoria
Referee: Joël Jutge (France)

2 June 2007
15:00 (UTC−2)

Uruguay	5–29	Italy
Try: Arocena 77' m		Try: Pratichetti (3) 40' m, 42' c, 44' c Agüero 80' c Con: Burton (3); Pen: Burton 12'

Estadio Gran Parque Central, Montevideo
Referee: Rob Debney (England)

9 June 2007
14:00 AST (UTC−3)

Argentina	24–6	Italy
Try: Leonelli 25' m Serra Miras 31' c Con: Serra Miras; Pen: Serra Miras (4) 2', 40', 47', 68'		Pen: Bortolussi (2) 36', 43'

Estadio Malvinas Argentinas, Mendoza
Referee: Lyndon Bray (New Zealand)

9 June 2007
18:00 AWST (UTC+8)

Australia	49–0	Fiji
Try: Staniforth (2) 6' c, 39' m Huxley 16' m Tuqiri (2) 27' m, 34' m Larkham 46' c Norton-Knight 56' m Ashley-Cooper 67' c Con: Huxley (3); Pen: Huxley 14'

Subiaco Oval, Perth
Attendance: 20,018
Referee: Bryce Lawrence (New Zealand)

9 June 2007
19:35 NZST (UTC+12)

New Zealand	61–10	France
Try: Oliver 6' c Kelleher; Rokocoko (2); MacDonald; Toeava; Collins; Mealamu; Evans; Con: McAlister (5); Pen: McAlister (2) 14', 22'		Try: J. Laharrague; Con: Boyet; Pen: Boyet 4'

Wellington Regional Stadium, Wellington
Referee: Craig Joubert (South Africa)

9 June 2007
15:00 SAST (UTC+2)

South Africa	35–8	Samoa
Try: Smit 20' c Pietersen 24' m Steyn 33' m Wannenburg 59' m Montgomery 64' c Con: Hougaard; Montgomery; Pen: Hougaard (2) 10', 14'		Try: An. Tuilagi 78' m Pen: Williams 12'

Ellis Park Stadium, Johannesburg
Referee: Malcolm Changleng (Scotland)

16 June 2007
19:35 NZST (UTC+12)

New Zealand	64–13	Canada
Try: Sivivatu 4' c McAlister 13' m Schwalger 26' c Hore 40' c Carter (3) 42' c, 53' m, 63' m Masoe 47' c Howlett 68' c Gear 78' c Con: Carter (7)		Try: Pyke 22' c Con: Pritchard; Pen: Pritchard 15'

Waikato Stadium, Hamilton
Referee: Christophe Berdos (France)

== See also ==
- Mid-year rugby union test series
- 2007 Rugby World Cup warm-up matches
- 2007 end-of-year rugby union tests
- 2007 Churchill Cup
- 2007 IRB Pacific Nations Cup
- 2007 IRB Nations Cup
