= 2007 Churchill Cup =

- Date: 18 May – 2 June 2007
- Countries: Canada; England Saxons; Ireland Wolfhounds; New Zealand Māori; Scotland A United States

Final positions
- Champions: England (3rd title)

Tournament statistics
- Matches played: 9

The 2007 Churchill Cup was held from May 18 to June 2, 2007. It was the fifth year of the Churchill Cup. Six rugby union teams took part: Canada, England Saxons, Ireland A, New Zealand Māori, Scotland A, and the USA.

== Format ==
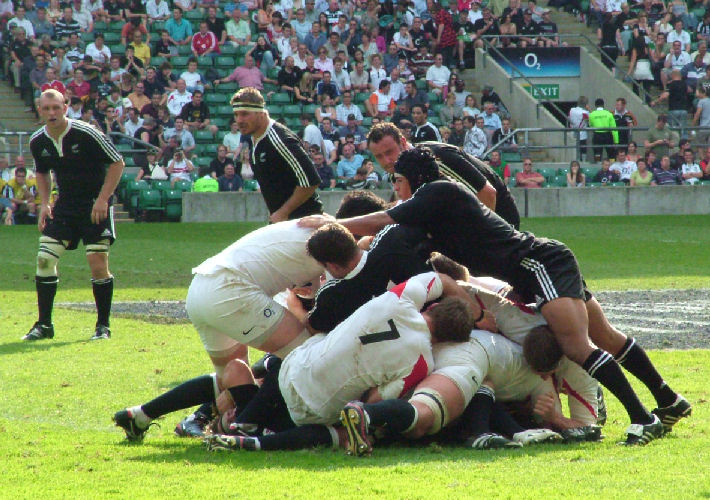
Churchill Cup Final, 2007

The teams were split into two pools of three teams each. The winners of the two pools moved on to compete in the overall final, while the two runners-up competed for the Plate, and the two bottom-placed teams contested the Bowl. All of the finals were played on 2 June 2007 at Twickenham.

2007 was the first occasion where the competition was played outside of North America. This was because many players were to be in Europe ahead of the Rugby World Cup.

== Results ==
=== USA Pool ===
Place	Nation	Games				Points			Bonus points	Table points
Place	Nation	Played	Won	Drawn	Lost	For	Against	Difference	Bonus points	Table points
1	England Saxons	2	2	0	0	69	6	+63	1	9
2	Scotland A	2	1	0	1	16	27	-11	0	4
3	United States	2	0	0	2	12	64	-52	1	1

2007-05-18
19:45

England Saxons	51 – 3	United States
Tries: Ojo; Crane (3); Armitage (2); Evans; Forster; Dickson; Con: Lamb (3)	Report	Pen: Malifa

Edgeley Park, Stockport
Attendance: 6,050
Referee: George Clancy

2007-05-23
18:00

Scotland A	13 – 9	United States
Try: Lamont; Con: Ross; Pen: Ross (2)	Report	Pen: Viljoen (3)

Henley
Attendance: 1,103
Referee: P. Smith

2007-05-28
15:00

England Saxons	18 – 3	Scotland A
Tries: Paice; Abendanon; Con: Barkley; Pen: Barkley; Mordt	(Report)	Pen: MacRae

Twickenham, London
Attendance: 11,100
Referee: C. Pollock

=== Canada Pool ===
Place	Nation	Games				Points			Bonus points	Table points
Place	Nation	Played	Won	Drawn	Lost	For	Against	Difference	Bonus points	Table points
1	Māori	2	2	0	0	109	45	+64	2	10
2	Ireland A	2	1	0	1	61	70	-9	2	6
3	Canada	2	0	0	2	43	98	-55	0	0

2007-05-19
20:00

Ireland A	39 – 20	Canada
Tries: Caldwell; Cave; Earls; Hearty; O'Connor; Staunton; Con: Staunton (3); Pen: Staunton	(Report)	Tries: Culpan van Camp; Con: Pritchard (2); Pen: Pritchard (2)

Sandy Park, Exeter
Attendance: 5,000
Referee: A. Small

2007-05-25
20:00

Māori	59 – 23	Canada
Tries: Waldrom; Te Whare; Tahana (2); Horton; Bruce; Kawau; Ellison; Smith; Con: Bruce (6)	(Report)	Tries: Kleeberger; Pyke; Carpenter; Con: Pritchard; Pen: Pritchard (2)

Franklin's Gardens, Northampton
Attendance: 4,356
Referee: J. Jones

2007-05-29
20:00

Māori	50 – 22	Ireland A
Tries: Gear (2); Paku; Ellison; May (2); Bruce; Con: Ellison (5); Sweeney; Pen: Ellison	(Report)	Tries: Cave (2); Earls; Gannon; Con: Sexton

Sandy Park, Exeter
Attendance: 6,295
Referee: A. MacPherson

=== Finals ===
==== Bowl Final ====
2007-06-02
11:30

Canada	52 – 10	United States
Tries: Stephen (2); Spicer; Williams (2); Kleeberger; D. Pletch; Con: Pritchard (7); Pen: Pritchard	Report	Tries: MacDonald; Sika

Twickenham, London
Referee: C. Pollock

==== Plate Final ====
2007-06-02
13:45

Scotland A	21 – 22	Ireland A
Tries: Lawson; Thom Evans; Con: McRae; Pen: McRae (3)	(report)	Tries: Murphy; Wilson; Earls; Con: Sexton; Keatley; Pen: Sexton

Twickenham, London

==== Cup Final ====
2007-06-02
16:30

England Saxons	17 – 13	Māori
Tries: Sackey; Voyce; Croft; Con: Barkley	(Report)	Tries: Tahana; Kawau; Pen: Ellison

Twickenham, London
Attendance: 8,324
Referee: George Clancy

== See also ==
- Churchill Cup
