= 2006 Italy rugby union tour =

- Manager: Pierre Berbizier
- Tour captain: Marco Bortolami
Summary
P	W	D	L
Total
2	1	0	1
Test match
2	1	0	1
Opponent
P	W	D	L
Japan
1	1	0	0
Fiji
1	0	0	1

The 2006 Italy rugby union tour was a series of two matches played in June 2006 in Japan and Fiji by Italy national rugby union team. After a convincing victory against Japan, the team managed by Pierre Berbizier, lost against Fiji.

== Results ==
11 June 2006

Japan	6–52	Italy
Pen: Ikeda 2		Try: M Bergamasco 2, Bortolussi; Dallan, De Jager; Dellapè, Sole; Con: Marcato 3 Pez 4 Pen: Pez

Chichibu, Tokyo
Attendance: 9,000
Referee: Scott Young (Australia)

Japan: 15. Keiji Takei, 14. Kosuke Endo, 13. Atsushi Moriya, 12. Yuta Imamura, 11. Nataniela Oto, 10. Shotaro Onishi, 9. Wataru Ikeda, 8. Hajime Kiso, 7. Ryota Asano Inose (capt.), 6. Tomoaki Nakai, 5. Tomoaki Taniguchi, 4. Takanori Kumagae, 3. Ryo Yamamura, 2. Yuji Matsubara, 1. Tomokazu Soma – Replacements: 16. Takashi Yamaoka, 17. Yuichi Hisadomi, 18. Hitoshi Ono, 19. Takashi Kikutani, 22. Hiroki Mizuno, 22. Hiroki Mizuno, 22. Hiroki Mizuno – Unused: 20. Mamoru Ito, 21. Hideyuki Yoshida
Italy: 15. Matteo Barbini, 14. Roberto Mandelli, 13. Andrea Masi, 12. Mirco Bergamasco, 11. Denis Dallan, 10. Ramiro Pez, 9. Paul Griffen, 8. Josh Sole (yellow card) , 7. Mauro Bergamasco, 6. Silvio Orlando, 5. Marco Bortolami (capt.), 4. Santiago Dellapè, 3. Manuel Dallan, 2. Fabio Ongaro, 1. Andrea Lo Cicero – Replacements: 16. Leonardo Ghiraldini, 17. Fabio Staibano, 18. Carlo Del Fava, 19. Robert Barbieri, 20. Simon Picone, 21. Andrea Marcato, 22. Giorgio Intoppa

17 June 2006

Fiji	29–18	Italy
Try: Caucaunibuca, Ligairi; Rauluni, Salabogi; Con: Baikeinuku 3 Pen: Baikeinuku		Try: Lo Ciero, Parisse; Con: Pez; Pen: Pez 2

Churchill Park, Lautoka
Attendance: 4,000
Referee: Marius Jonker (South Africa)

Fiji: 15. Norman Ligairi, 14. Mosese Luveitasau, 13. Kameli Ratuvou, 12. Seru Rabeni, 11. Rupeni Caucaunibuca, 10. Seremaia Baikeinuku, 9. Jacob Rauluni, 8. Netani Talei, 7. Alifereti Doviverata, 6. Ifereimi Rawaqa, 5. Simon Raiwalui (c), 4. Isoa Domolailai, 3. Apisai Nagi Mavua, 2. Sunia Koto, 1. Josese Baleikasavu – Replacements: 17. Ravuama Samo, 18. Kini Salabogi, 19. Akapusi Qera, 20. Emosi Vucago, 22. Maleli Kunavore – Unused: 16. Joeli Lotawa, 20. Emosi Vucago, 21. Jo Tora
Italy: 15. Matteo Barbini, 14. Pablo Canavosio, 13. Andrea Masi, 12. Mirco Bergamasco, 11. Giorgio Intoppa, 10. Ramiro Pez, 9. Paul Griffen, 8. Josh Sole, 7. Mauro Bergamasco, 6. Sergio Parisse, 5. Carlo Del Fava, 4. Santiago Dellapè, 3. Marco Bortolami (capt.), 2. Fabio Ongaro, 1. Andrea Lo Cicero – Replacements: 16. Leonardo Ghiraldini, 17. Matías Agüero, 18. Fabio Staibano, 19. Roberto Mandelli, 20. Robert Barbieri – Unused: 21. Simon Picone, 22. Manuel Dallan
