= Pletch =

Pletch is a surname. Notable people with the surname include:

- Dan Pletch (born 1983), Canadian rugby union player, identical twin of Mike
- Mike Pletch (born 1983), Canadian rugby union player

== See also ==
- Petch
- Pletsch
