= Philip O'Reilly =

Philip O'Reilly may refer to:

- Philip O'Reilly (Cavan County MP) (1599–1655), member of parliament for County Cavan, and leading member of the 1641 Rebellion
- Philip Og O'Reilly (c. 1640–1703), member of parliament for Cavan Borough
- Philip Leo O'Reilly, Irish bishop
- Philip O'Reilly (rugby union) Japanese rugby union player

== See also ==
- Philip Reilly, American fencer
