= Patrick Riordan =

Patrick Riordan may refer to:

- Patrick William Riordan (1841–1914), American Roman Catholic priest; second Archbishop of San Francisco
- Pat Riordan (born 1979), Canadian rugby union player
