= Jim Evans (rugby union) =

English rugby union player

- Born: James Clive Evans; 2 August 1980 (age 46) Orsett, Essex, England
- Height: 6 ft 6 in (1.98 m)
- Weight: 106 kg (16 st 10 lb)

Rugby union career
- Position: Lock
- Current team: Harlequins
Senior career
Years	Team	Apps	(Points)
- Thurrock
1999 - 2009	Harlequins	173	(65)
International career
Years	Team	Apps	(Points)
2007	England Saxons	3	(5)

Jim Evans (born 2 August 1980, in Orsett) is a former English rugby union player who played in the position of lock for Harlequins in the Guinness Premiership.

Evans joined Harlequins in 1999, making his League debut against the Northampton Saints on 19 April 2000.

Evans represented England at the 2001 Under 21 Rugby World Championship in Australia.

In 2004 he was a member of the Quins European Challenge Cup winning side, as they defeated Montferrand 27–26.

Evans represented England Saxons at the 2007 Churchill Cup.

Evans announced his retirement following his latest shoulder injury on 9 December 2009.

Evans has a pizza named after him called 'The Gladiator'. Sadly the restaurant has now closed down.
