= Pletsch =

Pletsch is a surname. Notable people with the surname include:

- Charles Pletsch (1893–1950), Canadian hockey player
- Fred Pletsch, Canadian-American hockey analyst
- Marcelo Pletsch (born 1976), Brazilian footballer

== See also ==
- Pletch
