= Isoa Neivua =

Fiji international rugby union player

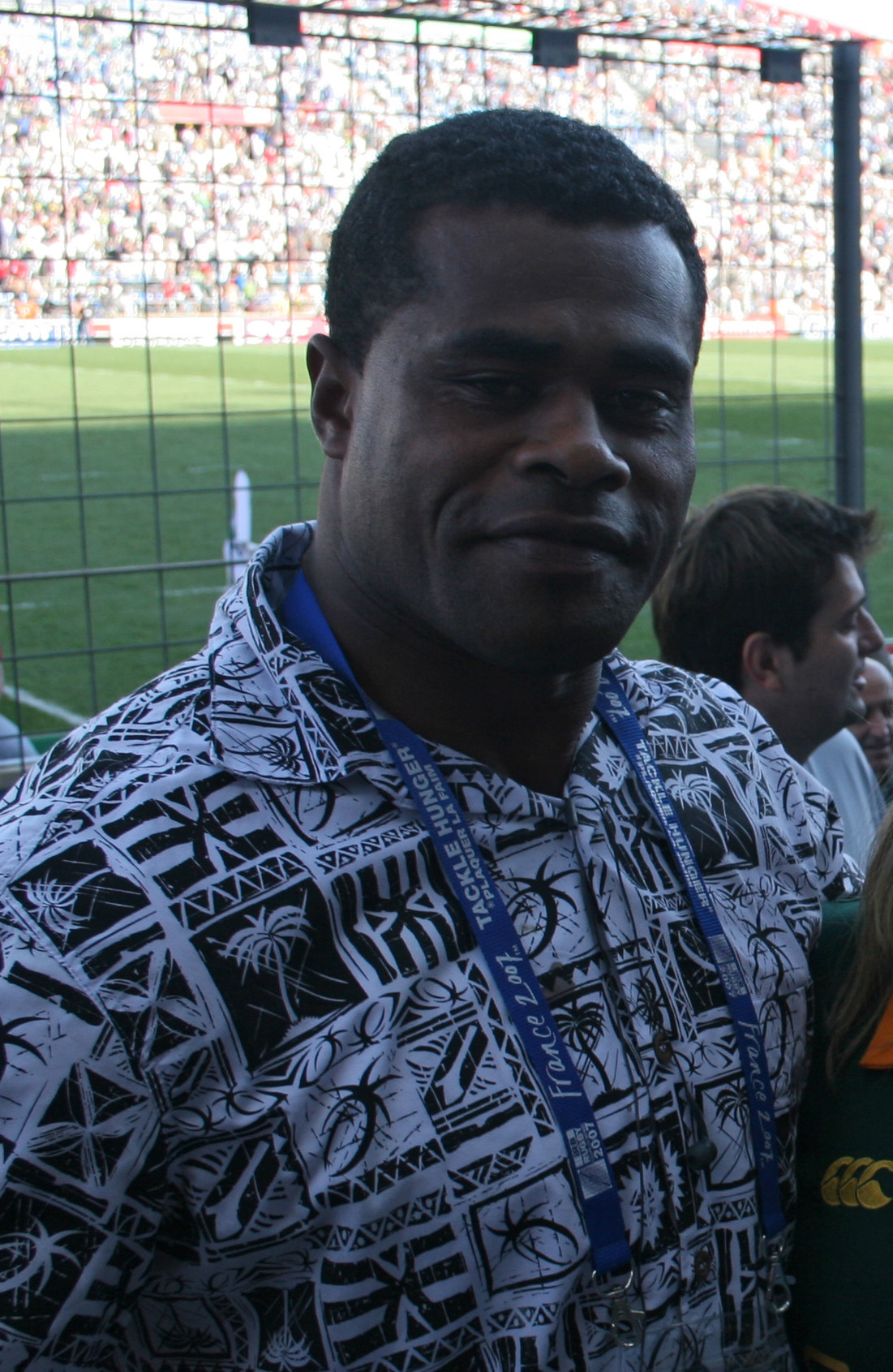
- Neivua during 2007 Rugby World Cup
- Born: Isoa Coalala Neivua; 19 July 1978 (age 48) Sigatoka, Fiji
- Height: 1.74 m (5 ft 9 in)
- Weight: 98 kg (15 st 6 lb)

Rugby union career
- Position: Wing
Senior career
Years	Team	Apps	(Points)
2002 - 2002	Navosa	10	(5)
2003 - 2004	Nadroga	9	(25)
2004 - 2007	Stallions	10	(30)
2005 - 2007	Northland	7	(5)
2007 - 2007	Fiji Warriors	2	(5)
2008 - 2009	Viadana	13	(5)
International career
Years	Team	Apps	(Points)
2007 -	Fiji	8	(10)

Isoa Coalala Neivua (born 7 June 1978 in Mosimosi, Sigatoka, Fiji) is a Fijian rugby union player. He plays as a wing or centre.

== Career ==
Playing in Fiji, he moved from Navosa to Nadroga in 2003 to get more chance of being spotted by for the national team. A great showing in the Colonial Cup saw Neivua dubbed as the next Rupeni Caucau, but injury ruled him out of the Pacific Tri-Nations tournament. His return to the Nadroga jersey came just in time for the knock-out stages of the Telecom Fiji Cup where he was instrumental in Nadro's semi-final win over Naitasiri. He also scored a powerful try in the final. On his unofficial Fiji debut against the NZ Divisional XV in 2004, he scored a try just six minutes after coming on as a substitute in the second half. He made his debut in the Pacific Nations Cup loss against Samoa in Apia in 2007. Neivua was chosen as one of the 3 wingers for the 2007 Rugby World Cup ahead of star wingers Rupeni Caucau and Sireli Bobo. He most recently played for Viadana in Italy. He now plays for Nadroga back in Fiji. Neivua got to start for the BarbariansRFC against the Springboks later in 2007.
