= Taku Inokuchi =

Japanese rugby union player

- Born: 5 October 1982 (age 44) Japan
- Height: 1.76 m (5 ft 9 in)
- Weight: 100 kg (220 lb; 15 st 10 lb)

Rugby union career
- Position: Hooker
Senior career
Years	Team	Apps	(Points)
2010–2013	Toshiba Brave Lupus	11	(0)
- Correct as of 6 May 2021
International career
Years	Team	Apps	(Points)
2007–2008	Japan	7	(5)
- Correct as of 6 May 2021

Taku Inokuchi (猪口拓, Inokuchi Taku; born 5 October 1982) is a former Japanese rugby union player who played as a hooker. He spent his whole career playing for Toshiba Brave Lupus in Japan's domestic Top League, playing over 10 times. He was named as a backup player for Japan for the 2007 Rugby World Cup, making two appearances in the tournament. He made a further 5 appearances for Japan, scoring a try.
