= Vereniki Sauturaga =

Fijian rugby union player (born 1982)

- Born: Vereniki Sauturaga Racagi; 19 November 1982 (age 43) Suva, Fiji
- Height: 1.79 m (5 ft 10 in)
- Weight: 101 kg (15 st 13 lb)

Rugby union career
- Position(s): Hooker, Flanker
Senior career
Years	Team	Apps	(Points)
- Naitasiri
–	Knights		
–	Fiji Warriors		
–	Fiji Barbarians		
International career
Years	Team	Apps	(Points)
2007 -	Fiji	7	(0)

Vereniki Sauturaga Racagi (born 18 November 1982 in Suva) is a Fijian rugby union player. He plays as a hooker.

== Career ==
His present team is Fiji Warriors. He was selected for the Fijian squad for the 2007 Rugby World Cup finals, he played in three matches. He has been selected into the Fiji squad for the 2008 IRB Pacific Nations Cup. He currently holds 6 caps for his National Team.
