= Henry Qiodravu =

Fijian rugby union player (born 1977)

- Born: Anare Qiodravu Rawaico; 8 February 1977 (age 49) Suva, Fiji
- Height: 1.81 m (5 ft 11 in)
- Weight: 116 kg (18 st 4 lb)

Rugby union career
- Position: Prop
Senior career
Years	Team	Apps	(Points)
2005 - 2006	Auch		
2006 - 2009	Orléans	47	(0)
International career
Years	Team	Apps	(Points)
2000 -	Fiji	18	(0)

Anare Qiodravu Rawaico (born 8 February 1977, in Suva) is a Fijian rugby union player. His position is as a prop.

== Career ==
Qiodravu played for Waikato University, in New Zealand, moving then to France, first playing at FC Auch (2005–2006), and for RC Orléans, since 2006. He was first capped for Fiji, in a 37–21 win over the USA, on 30 June 2000. After a six-year absence, Qiodravu returned to his national side, being selected for the 2007 Rugby World Cup finals, where he played in all five games. He has been absent from the Fijian team since. Qiodravu currently holds 18 caps for his national side.
