= Aca Ratuva =

Fijian rugby union player (born 1978)

- Born: Ratu Aca Ronald Gavidi Ratuva; 30 December 1978 (age 47) FijI
- Height: 1.86 m (6 ft 1 in)
- Weight: 102 kg (16 st 1 lb)

Rugby union career
- Position(s): Flanker, Centre
Senior career
Years	Team	Apps	(Points)
1997–2004	Nadroga		
2004–2006	Agen	36	(15)
2006–2007	Massy	10	(15)
International career
Years	Team	Apps	(Points)
2005–2008	Fiji	17	(5)
2006	Pacific Islanders	1	(0)

Ratu Aca Ronald Gavidi Ratuva (born 30 December 1978) is a Fijian former professional rugby union player. He plays as a flanker or centre.

== Career ==
Ratuva moved to Agen in France, playing there from 2004 to 2006, and moving to Massy, the same year. Ratuva gained his first cap for Fiji on 3 June 2005, in the 29–27 loss to New Zealand Maori.

He was a member of the Fijian squad at the 2007 Rugby World Cup. He played in four matches of the successful campaign of his country, that reached for the second time ever the quarter-finals, including the 37–20 loss to South Africa.

He currently holds 17 caps for his country, with a try scored, 5 points in total.
