= Adam Freier =

Australia international rugby union player

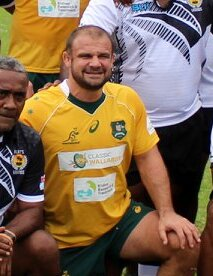
- Freier in 2018
- Born: Adam Leigh Freier; 20 March 1980 (age 46) Sydney, New South Wales, Australia
- Height: 1.75 m (5 ft 9 in)
- Weight: 98 kg (15.4 st; 216 lb)
- School: Waverley College

Rugby union career
- Position: Hooker
Provincial / State sides
Years	Team	Apps	(Points)
2000–2002	ACT & Southern NSW	9	(5)
2003–2019	Randwick DRUFC	70	(60)
Super Rugby
Years	Team	Apps	(Points)
2000–2002	Brumbies	6	(5)
2003–2010	Waratahs	80	(60)
2011–2012	Rebels	16	(15)
- Correct as of 23 July 2012
International career
Years	Team	Apps	(Points)
1998	Australian Schoolboys		
2002–2008	Australia	25	(10)
- Correct as of 15 August 2013

Adam Freier (born 20 March 1980) is an Australian former rugby union footballer. In 2011 and 2012 he played for the Rebels in the Super Rugby competition, and retired at the end of 2012 from professional rugby. In 2015 he came out of retirement to play Shute Shield for Randwick. His playing position was hooker.

== Playing career ==
Son of Sydney rugby league footballer and coach Laurie Freier born 20 March 1980, in Paddington, NSW, Australia, he made the Australian Schoolboys in 1998 as well as the under-19s, which he captained the following year. In 2000 he signed with the Brumbies and made his state debut against Queensland. He went on to play for the Australian under-21s, including captaining them at the 2001 under-21 Rugby Championships, in which they finished runner-up to New Zealand. He made his debut for the Wallabies in 2002, in a Test against Argentina.

Freier left the Brumbies and signed with the Waratahs for the 2003 season, and was selected to captain the Waratahs tour of Argentina in post-season 2004, and was voted player of the tour. In 2005 he was selected for the final match of the 2005 Tri Nations Series. After he was selected as the run-on hooker in the second Cook Cup match in 2006.

In April 2010 Freier signed on with the Rebels for the 2011 season of Super Rugby. Freier told the Sydney Morning Herald his reasons for approaching the Rebels included: "Mutual respect, a coach he admires, the challenge of new team." Freier was sidelined in September due to complications from a 2008 back injury. Rebels coach Rod Macqueen reported Frier to be undergoing rehabilitation. Frier wasn't fit to compete in pre-season trials against teams from Tonga and Fiji, and the Crusaders from New Zealand; he remained in doubt for the Rebels' season opener against the Waratahs.

Freier played three Rebels games for the 2011 Super Rugby season. In May 2012, he expected to play his 100th Super Rugby game. In 2019, he played one game for Randwick against Argentina.

== Journalism ==
Freier writes about the Wallabies, Melbourne's crowded sporting landscape, and his own squad the Melbourne Rebels. Fairfax Media publishes his articles in the Sydney Morning Herald and/or the Melbourne Age. Freier is also a regular panellist on the ABC Offsiders sports program.

== Rugby Union Players Association ==
Freier is president of RUPA, the Rugby Union Players Association.
