= David Biddle =

Canada international rugby union player

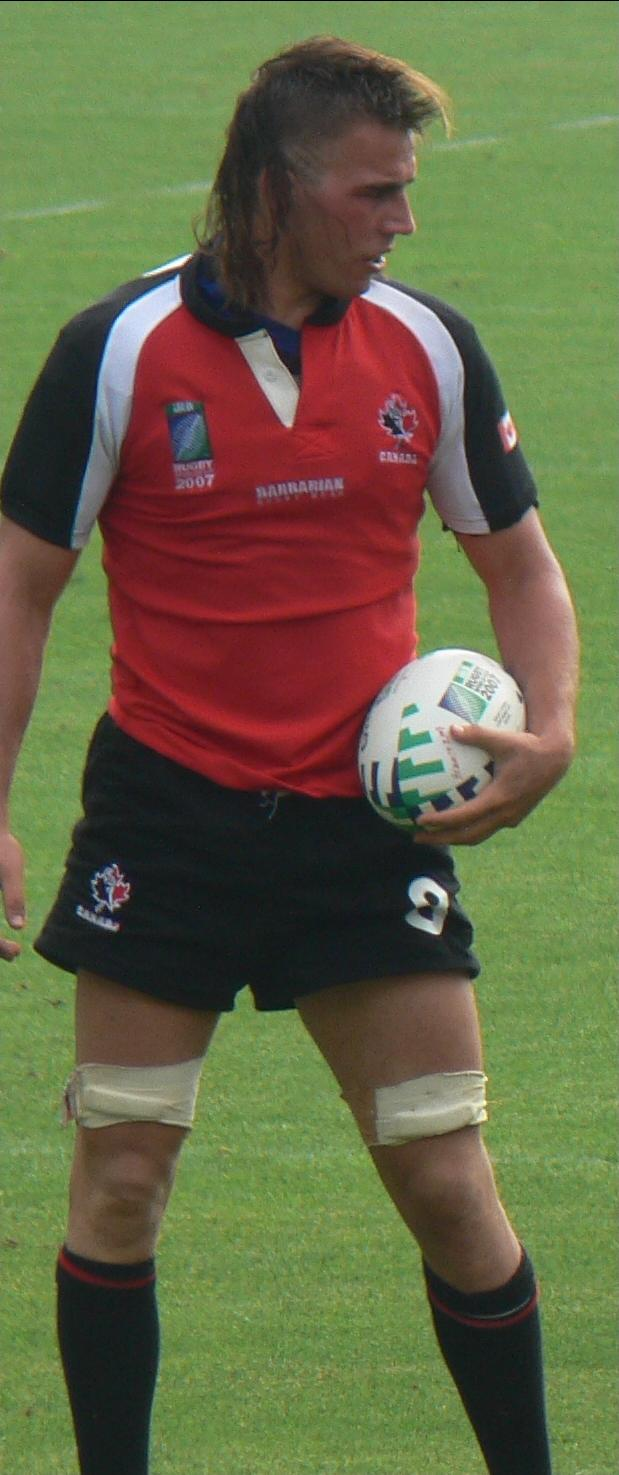
- Born: 10 August 1985 (age 41) Canada
- Height: 189 cm (6 ft 2 in)
- Weight: 102 kg (225 lb; 16 st 1 lb)

Rugby union career
- Position: Flanker
International career
Years	Team	Apps	(Points)
2006–2007	Canada	6	(0)
- Correct as of 5 May 2021

David Biddle (born 10 August 1985) was a Canadian rugby union player. His playing position was flanker. He was named in the Canada squad for the 2007 Rugby World Cup, making 3 appearances in the tournament. His World Cup appearances would be the final of his six international appearances before returning to his studies.
