= Jone Railomo =

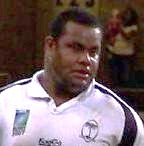
- Railomo at the 2007 Rugby World Cup
- Born: Jone Railomo Taginayavusa; 26 February 1981 Suva, Fiji
- Died: August 8, 2009 (aged 28) CWM Hospital, Suva
- Height: 1.87 m (6 ft 2 in)
- Weight: 127 kg (20 st 0 lb)

Rugby union career
- Position: Prop
Senior career
Years	Team	Apps	(Points)
- Piteia
2004 - 2004	Stallions		
2005 - 2006	Vichy		
2006 - 2007	Poitiers		
2007 - 2008	Vichy		
2008 - 2009	Poitiers		
2009	Ovalau		
International career
Years	Team	Apps	(Points)
2005 - 2008	Fiji	10	(0)

Jone Railomo Taginayavusa (26 February 1981 in Suva – 8 August 2009) was a Fijian rugby union player. He played as a prop.

== Career ==
Railomo played in Fiji for Piteia. He moved to France, where he played for Racing Club Vichy for the 2005/06 season, then for Poitiers for 2006/07, returning to Racing Club Vichy for 2007/08. He was then assigned for Poitiers, for the 2008/09 season.

He gained his first cap for Fiji shorter after moving to France, on 10 June 2005, in the heavy loss to the All Blacks by 91–0. He then was inactive for a year due to injury. He was capped again after being selected for the Fijian squad for the 2007 Rugby World Cup finals, playing all the five matches in the successful campaign of his country. Fiji's World Cup run finished in the quarter-finals in a 37–20 loss to South Africa.

Railomo earned four more caps since then, holding 10 caps for his national side.

== Death ==
Railomo died in the early hours of 8 August 2009 after being hospitalized a few days earlier because of a sickness. He was 28.
