= Tomoki Yoshida =

Japanese rugby union player

- Born: February 22, 1982 (age 44) Kyoto, Japan
- Height: 5 ft 7.75 in (1.72 m)
- Weight: 172 lb (78 kg)

Rugby union career
- Position: Scrum-half
- Current team: Toshiba Brave Lupus
Senior career
Years	Team	Apps	(Points)
2004−2017	Toshiba Brave Lupus	124	(145)
- Correct as of 15 January 2017
International career
Years	Team	Apps	(Points)
2007–2011	Japan	25	(0)

Tomoki Yoshida (吉田朋生, Yoshida Tomoki; born 22 February 1982 in Kyoto, Japan) is a Japanese rugby union footballer. He plays as a scrum-half.

He plays for the Toshiba Brave Lupus in Japan's Top League.

He had 25 caps for Japan, from 2007 to 2011, scoring 2 tries, 10 points on aggregate. He was called for the 2007 Rugby World Cup, playing in three games but without scoring. He played again for his country at the 2011 Rugby World Cup in New Zealand, in a single game, once again remaining scoreless.
