= Petch =

Petch may refer to:

- Henry Petch, partner of Perkins, Bacon & Petch
- Howard Petch (1925–2018), Canadian academic administrator
- Ivan Petch (born 1939), former Australian politician
- Karen Petch, English broadcaster and news presenter
- Mark Petch, founder of Mark Petch Motorsport
- N. J. Petch, co-discoverer of the Hall-Petch relationship
- Tom Petch (1870–1948), English mycologist
- Rattana Petch-Aporn (born 1982), Thai footballer
