= Yasunori Watanabe =

Japan international rugby union player

- Born: July 2, 1974 Tokyo
- Died: April 3, 2010 (aged 35) Kamakura Kanagawa Prefecture
- Height: 1.92 m (6 ft 4 in)
- Weight: 104 kg (229 lb; 16.4 st)

Rugby union career
- Position(s): Lock, Flanker
International career
Years	Team	Apps	(Points)
1996–2007	Japan	32	(40)

Yasunori Watanabe (渡辺泰憲, Watanabe Yasunori) (2 July 1974 – 3 April 2010) was a Japanese rugby player, who played for Japan in three Rugby World Cups from 1999 to 2007.

== Career ==
Watanabe was born in Hokkaido, and joined the team Toshiba Brave Lupus in Tokyo in 1997 after graduating from Nippon Sport Science University. He played 32 times for the national team and in Brave Lupus's hat-trick of Japanese domestic league titles between 2004 and 2006.

== Death ==
On 3 April 2010, Yasunori died at the age of 35, when he fell off a train station platform and was hit by a train at Kamakura Station in Kanagawa Prefecture. An employee at the station saw Watanabe fall at about 9:30 p.m.
