= Julian Huxley (rugby union) =

Australia international rugby union player

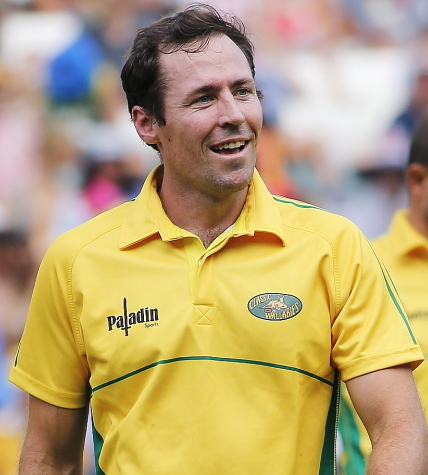
- Born: Julian Huxley; 3 August 1979 (age 47) Sydney, Australia
- Height: 1.86 m (6 ft 1 in)
- Weight: 94 kg (14 st 11 lb)
- School: Sydney Grammar School; The King's School, Sydney
- University: Australian National University

Rugby union career
- Position(s): Fullback, Halfback
Provincial / State sides
Years	Team	Apps	(Points)
2004	Northland	7	(60)
Super Rugby
Years	Team	Apps	(Points)
2002	ACT Brumbies	7	(36)
2003–06	Reds	31	(135)
2007–10	Brumbies	21	(104)
2011–12	Rebels	22	(67)
- Correct as of 23 July 2012
International career
Years	Team	Apps	(Points)
2007	Australia	9	(22)
Coaching career
- Years: Team
- 2017–pres.: Sydney Rays
- 2016: Penrith

Julian Huxley (born 3 August 1979) is a retired Australian rugby union professional footballer. In 2008 he had established himself in the Wallabies and was named Australian Rookie of the Year. In 2011 he played for the Melbourne Rebels in the Super Rugby competition.

== Early life ==
Huxley played for a Lindfield club in his youth, and was educated at the St Ives prep school of Sydney Grammar School and The King's School, Sydney and went on to play for the Gordon and Sydney University clubs. Huxley has previously appeared for the under-19, under-21 and 'A' Australia sides, he also played for the Australian sevens.

== Rugby career ==
Huxley made his Super Rugby debut for the Queensland Reds in 2003. His Reds season was successful year and was awarded the Pilecki Medal to become the player of the year. At the end of 2004 he went to New Zealand to play for Northland.

He returned to Super Rugby in 2005, and subsequently played every match of the season. After the Reds' 2006 season Huxley joined the Brumbies.

On 4 March 2008, the Brumbies announced Huxley had been diagnosed with a brain tumour after suffering a seizure during a match against Queensland the previous week. Huxley stopped playing immediately to undergo surgery, radiotherapy and chemotherapy to treat his condition. He had surgery which was successful and in March 2010, gained a medical clearance to resume playing.

Huxley signed with the Melbourne Rebels in May 2010. Rebels' head coach Rod Macqueen, said, "Julian has shown great form since his return. He brings with him a fantastic attitude to life and the game we can all learn from. He is an intelligent player who will make a significant contribution to the Rebels." Huxley's reported motivation to move to Melbourne is to start a "new chapter" in his life. He told a Herald Sun journalist that: "Everything about Melbourne; the culture, the lifestyle, and of course the excitement around the Rebels makes this a great move for me."

In an effort to regain his fitness Huxley played in just one Rebels' pre-season trial (against the Crusaders), running on with his former teammate Stirling Mortlock. Huxley's move to Melbourne also attracted the attention of The Age and The Australian. In July 2012 Huxley left the Melbourne Rebels. He moved to France to play Narbonne in the Rugby Pro D2 competition.

== Coaching ==
Huxley was an assistant coach for the Sydney Rays team in the National Rugby Championship in 2016. Later that year, he was appointed head coach of Shute Shield club Penrith Emus for the 2017 season. After Simon Cron took a job with the NSW Waratahs, the Sydney Rays promoted Huxley to the head coaching position for 2017.
