= Ryō Yamamura =

Japan international rugby union player

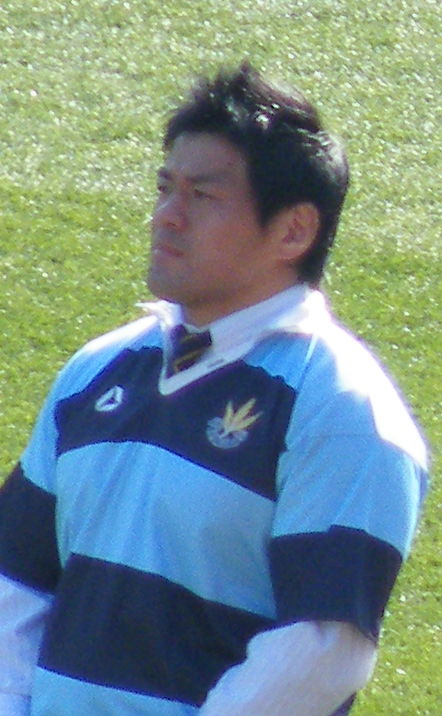
- Yamamura in 2013
- Born: 9 August 1981 (age 45) Saga, Japan
- Height: 1.85 m (6 ft 1 in)
- Weight: 114 kg (251 lb; 18.0 st)

Rugby union career
- Position: Prop
Senior career
Years	Team	Apps	(Points)
2004–2021	Yamaha Júbilo	211	(40)
International career
Years	Team	Apps	(Points)
2001-2007	Japan	39	(5)

Ryō Yamamura (山村 亮, Yamamura Ryō; born 9 August 1981 in Saga, Japan) is a Japanese former rugby union player and coach. He played as a prop. Yamamura had 39 caps for the Japan national rugby union team, and played professionally in the Rugby Top League. Since retiring as a player he has coached teams including Kurita Water Gash Akishima, the Japan U20 squad, and Kubota Spears.

Yamamura had the qualities to become a sumo professional, but preferred rugby instead. He played for Kanto Gakuin University. He was regularly picked for the Japan national rugby union team. He played one match at the 2003 Rugby World Cup and four matches at the 2007 Rugby World Cup.

== Clubs ==
- Kanto Gakuin University
- Yamaha Jubilo

== Honours ==
- 39 caps for Japan national rugby union team, with 1 try scored, 5 points in aggregate.
- On 16 December 2016, Yamamura had his 150th appearance in the Rugby Top League. By the end of his professional career, he had 173 caps for Yamaha Jubilo.
