= Ric Suggitt =

Canadian rugby union player & coach

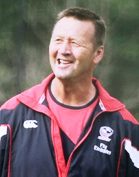
- Born: October 30, 1958 Edmonton, Alberta
- Died: June 27, 2017 (aged 58) Calgary, Alberta

Rugby union career
Coaching career
- Years: Team
- 2010-2017: United States 7s Women's
- 2004-2007: Canada
- –: Canada 7s
- –: Canada 7s Women's
- –: University of Victoria

Richard Allan "Sluggo" Suggitt (October 30, 1958 – June 27, 2017) was a Canadian rugby union footballer and a rugby union coach. Ric was also the head coach of the USA Women's 7's Olympic team and was the head coach at University of Lethbridge.

He had to leave competitive rugby at a young age due to successive shoulder injuries. Then, he began his international coaching career.

Suggitt was the coach of the female Canada national team and the men's national seven-a-side team, when he was appointed to the post of coach of the male Canada national rugby union team, in 2004. Under Suggitt the national team achieved qualification to the 2007 Rugby World Cup by beating the USA Eagles 56–7. The World Cup was not so successful and disappointingly only reached a 12–12 draw with Japan. In March 2008, he was replaced by New Zealand coach Kieran Crowley. Suggitt died on June 27, 2017, at the age of 58.

Sporting positions
Preceded by (Australia) Dave Clark	Canada National Rugby Union Coach; 2004-2007	Succeeded by (New Zealand) Kieran Crowley
