= Yuta Imamura =

Japan international rugby union player

- Born: October 31, 1984 (age 42)
- Height: 5 ft 10 in (1.78 m)
- Weight: 202 lb (92 kg; 14 st 6 lb)

Rugby union career
- Position: Centre / Wing
Senior career
Years	Team	Apps	(Points)
2007–2019	Kobelco Steelers	124	(175)
2020–2022	Munakata Sanix Blues	4	(5)
International career
Years	Team	Apps	(Points)
2006–2013	Japan	39	(80)

Yuta Imamura (今村雄太, Imamura Yūta) (born 31 October 1984 in Mie, Japan) is a Japanese rugby union player. Imamura has played 38 international matches for the Japan national rugby union team.

Imamura was a member of the Japan team at the 2007 Rugby World Cup and the 2011 Rugby World Cup.
