= Tomokazu Soma =

Japanese rugby union player (born 1977)

Tomokazu Soma (相馬朋和, Sōma Tomokazu) (born 5 June 1977 in Kanagawa, Japan) is a Japanese rugby union player. Soma has played 24 matches for the Japan national rugby union team. Soma played three games for Japan at the 2007 Rugby World Cup.
