= Kosuke Endo =

Japanese rugby union player

- Born: November 11, 1980 (age 46) Hokkaido, Japan
- Height: 186 cm (6 ft 1 in)
- Weight: 90 kg (14 st 2 lb; 198 lb)
- School: Nakashibetsu High School
- University: Hosei University

Rugby union career
- Position: Wing
Senior career
Years	Team	Apps	(Points)
2004-	Toyota Verblitz		
Provincial / State sides
Years	Team	Apps	(Points)
2008	Canterbury		
International career
Years	Team	Apps	(Points)
2004-2011	Japan	42	(90)

Kosuke Endo (遠藤 幸佑, Endō Kōsuke; born November 11, 1980 in Nakashibetsu, Hokkaidō) is a Japanese rugby union player who won 41 caps for the Japan national team and represented them at the 2007 and 2011 Rugby World Cup.

Endo made his debut for Japan against Italy in July 2004, but then had to wait until 2006 until he returned for his second cap and then established himself as the first choice right wing after Daisuke Ohata late career was plagued by injuries, and remained there for most of John Kirwan's time as Japan coach between 2007 and 2011.

In the 2007 Rugby World Cup he notably finished a spectacular break out try from their own 5 metre line against Wales at the Millennium Stadium which was praised as one of the outstanding tries of the tournament one of Japan's best of all time. He followed that up by scoring another try against Canada in the next match from a run just under 50 metres through the defence. Endo left the World Cup with an increased reputation and coach John Kirwan said that "he could be one of the best wingers in the world". In 2008, Endo signed to play a season in the Air New Zealand Cup with Canterbury.

Endo remained in the Japan side until the 2011 Rugby World Cup where he started 3 matches. In the last match against Canada, Endo again scored a try like he did against the same opposition in the 2007 tournament, but also had a nightmare match in defence missing 5 tackles one of which led to a Canada try.

After that match, Endo was dropped by new coach Eddie Jones who put Toshiaki Hirose as captain ahead of him in his position on the wing. He was briefly recalled to a wider training squad in 2013 after some good form for his domestic side Toyota Verblitz but didn't play with younger players such as Yoshikazu Fujita and Kenki Fukuoka being preferred ahead of him.
