= Hare Makiri =

Japanese rugby union player

- Full name: Hare Makiri
- Born: 31 May 1978 (age 48) New Zealand
- Height: 1.90 m (6 ft 3 in)
- Weight: 110 kg (17 st 5 lb; 240 lb)

Rugby union career
- Position: Flanker
Senior career
Years	Team	Apps	(Points)
2000	Chiefs	7	(0)
2010–2012	Munakata Sanix Blues	23	(10)
- Correct as of 6 May 2021
International career
Years	Team	Apps	(Points)
2005–2008	Japan	26	(20)
- Correct as of 6 May 2021

Hare Makiri (うさぎまきり, Usagi ma kiri; born 31 May 1978) is a former Japanese rugby union player who played as a flanker. He played for the Chiefs in Super Rugby and Munakata Sanix Blues in the Top League. He was named in the Japan squad for the 2007 Rugby World Cup, making 4 appearances in the tournament. He made a further 22 appearances for Japan in his career, scoring five tries, before late coaching Japan Sevens.
