= Hajime Kiso =

Japan international rugby union player

- Born: November 7, 1978 (age 48) Osaka, Japan
- Height: 1.95 m (6 ft 5 in)
- Weight: 105 kg (231 lb; 16.5 st)
- University: Ritsumeikan University

Rugby union career
- Position: Number 8
- Current team: NTT Communications Shining Arcs
Senior career
Years	Team	Apps	(Points)
2001 - 2009	Yamaha Júbilo		
2010 -	NTT Communications Shining Arcs		
International career
Years	Team	Apps	(Points)
2001-2008	Japan	32	(0)
- Correct as of 1 October 2009

Hajime Kiso (木曽一,, Kiso Hajime) (born 7 November 1978) is a Japanese rugby union player, he plays Number 8.

He played for Yamaha Jubilo, from 2001/02 to 2008/09. He plays currently for NTT Communications Shining Arcs.

He had 32 caps for Japan national rugby union team, from 2001 to 2008, without scoring. He played six games at the 2003 and 2007 World Cups.

== Honours ==
- 32 caps for Japan national rugby union team
- Selections by year: 2 in 2001, 8 in 2003, 3 in 2004, 3 in 2005, 9 in 2006, 6 in 2007, 1 in 2008.
- Participation in the Rugby World Cup : 2003 (3 matches, 3 starts), 2003 (3 matches, 1 start).
