= Yuji Matsubara =

Japanese rugby union player

- Full name: Yuji Matsubara
- Born: 5 September 1979 (age 47) Shimonoseki, Yamaguchi, Japan
- Height: 1.80 m (5 ft 11 in)
- Weight: 100 kg (15 st 10 lb; 220 lb)

Rugby union career
- Position: Hooker
Senior career
Years	Team	Apps	(Points)
2010–2014	Kobelco Steelers	39	(20)
- Correct as of 6 May 2021
International career
Years	Team	Apps	(Points)
2004–2007	Japan	23	(10)
- Correct as of 6 May 2021

Yuji Matsubara (松原雄二, Matsubara Yūji; born 5 September 1979) is a former Japanese rugby union player who played as a hooker. He spent his whole career playing for Kobelco Steelers in Japan's domestic Top League, playing over 35 times. He was named in the Japan squad for the 2007 Rugby World Cup, making 3 appearances in the tournament. He made a further 20 appearances for Japan in his career, scoring two tries.
