= Tatsukichi Nishiura =

Japanese rugby union player

- Full name: Tatsukichi Nishiura
- Born: 20 February 1976 (age 50) Japan
- Height: 1.76 m (5 ft 9 in)
- Weight: 110 kg (17 st 5 lb; 240 lb)

Rugby union career
- Position: Prop
Senior career
Years	Team	Apps	(Points)
2010–2015	Coca-Cola Red Sparks	50	(0)
- Correct as of 6 May 2021
International career
Years	Team	Apps	(Points)
2004–2008	Japan	17	(5)
- Correct as of 6 May 2021

Tatsukichi Nishiura (西浦たつき, Nishiura Tatsuki; born 20 February 1976) is a former Japanese rugby union player who played as a prop. He spent his whole career playing for Coca-Cola Red Sparks in Japan's domestic Top League, playing over 50 times. He was named in the Japan squad for the 2007 Rugby World Cup, making 3 appearances in the tournament. He made a further 14 appearances for Japan in his career, scoring one try against Italy.
