= Philip O'Reilly (rugby union) =

Japanese rugby union player

- Born: 24 July 1980 (age 46) New Zealand
- Height: 1.90 m (6 ft 3 in)
- Weight: 100 kg (220 lb; 15 st 10 lb)

Rugby union career
- Position: Flanker
International career
Years	Team	Apps	(Points)
2005–2009	Japan	11	(35)
- Correct as of 6 May 2021

Philip O'Reilly (フィリップオライリー, Firippuorairī; born 24 July 1980) is a former Japanese rugby union player who played as a flanker. He was named in the Japan squad for the 2007 Rugby World Cup, making two appearances in the tournament. He made a further nine appearances for Japan in his career, scoring seven tries.
