= Craig Culpan =

Canada international rugby union player

- Born: Craig Culpan; 17 May 1982 Vancouver, British Columbia, Canada
- Height: 189 cm (6 ft 2 in)
- Weight: 95 kg (14 st 13 lb)

Rugby union career
- Position: Centre
Amateur team(s)
Years	Team	Apps	(Points)
- Meralomas
International career
Years	Team	Apps	(Points)
2007	Canada	6	(5)

Craig Culpan (born May 17, 1982 in Vancouver, British Columbia and raised in Auckland, New Zealand) was a Canadian rugby union player. Culpan was a member of the Canadian national team.
