= Tony Spreadbury =

English rugby union referee

Antony John "Tony" Spreadbury (born 28 March 1962 Bath, England) is a retired international rugby union referee.

In his earlier years, he attended Beechen Cliff School, in Bath. He refereed at the 2003 Rugby World Cup and has been professional since 2001. Before becoming a full-time referee he combined it with a career as a paramedic. Prior to becoming a referee in 1979 he played as a hooker before an injury forced him to stop. He refereed his first international test match on 9 June 1990, when he took charge of the match between Australia and France, having been added to the International Rugby Board refereeing panel in 1984.

Spreadbury was a full-time referee in the Guinness Premiership, EDF Energy Cup and Heineken Cup. He once took over from an injured Chris White in the Heineken Cup Final. He was renowned for talking a lot while refereeing.

He was appointed as one of the referees at the 2007 Rugby World Cup in France. Spreadbury refereed the opening game – Argentina v France. He retired from international refereeing after the 2007 Rugby World Cup finals held in France. He made a temporary return to refereeing at the start of the 2011 Rugby World Cup qualifying in the Cayman Islands.
