= Luke Tait =

- Born: Luke Tait; 26 October 1981 (age 45) Barrie, Ontario
- Height: 200 cm (6 ft 7 in)
- Weight: 108 kg (17 st 0 lb)

Rugby union career
- Position: Lock
Senior career
Years	Team	Apps	(Points)
2002-2003	Cardiff Rugby	1	(0)
2003-2005	Ospreys	24	(0)
–	Overmach Parma		
–	Stade Montois		
International career
Years	Team	Apps	(Points)
2005–2010	Canada	20	(5)

Luke Tait (born 26 October 1981 in Barrie, Ontario) is a Canadian rugby union player. He plays as a lock.

Tait last played for James Bay of the British Columbia Premiership. He has played previously for Cardiff RFC, Ospreys, Overmach Parma, and Stade Montois.

He was a part of the Canadian national team since his debut on 25 May 2005, in a 30–26 win over United States. He played three matches in the 2007 Rugby World Cup in France.

Tait earned 23 caps and scored his first points for Canada when he ran in a try versus Uruguay at the 2010 Churchill Cup.
