= Ed Fairhurst =

Canada international rugby union player

- Born: Edward Fairhurst; 7 May 1979 (age 47) Regina, Saskatchewan
- Height: 183 cm (6 ft 0 in)
- Weight: 93 kg (14 st 9 lb)

Rugby union career
- Position: Scrum-half / Fly-half / Fullback
Senior career
Years	Team	Apps	(Points)
2006-2007	Cardiff Blues	9	(0)
2007-2009	Cornish Pirates	49	(20)
International career
Years	Team	Apps	(Points)
2001-2012	Canada	57	(46)
National sevens team
Years	Team		Comps
	Canada		15

Edward Fairhurst (born May 7, 1979) is a former Canadian international rugby union player.

Fairhurst played primarily as a scrum half throughout his career making his debut for the Canada national team in May 2001. He was subsequently selected to the national squad for the 2003 Rugby World Cup in Australia, the 2007 Rugby World Cup in France and the 2011 Rugby World Cup. in New Zealand.

From 2001 - 2005 Fairhurst was a member of the national Seven-a-Side rugby team competing in 15 tournaments on the IRB Seven's World Series. In 2005 he was selected to the 2005 Seven-a-Side Rugby World Cup in Hong Kong.

In 2002, Fairhurst was a member of the national Seven-a-Side rugby team competing in the Commonwealth Games in Manchester, England.

In 2006, Fairhurst signed with the Cardiff Blues from the University of Victoria in British Columbia. He would play a year at Cardiff before moving to the south-west of England to play for the Cornish Pirates for the 2007–08 and 2008-09 seasons.

In 2009, Fairhurst joined RBC Dominion Securities in Vancouver, British Columbia. Edward holds both Chartered Investment Manager (CIM) and Certified Financial Planning (CFP) designations along with Securities, Options, Derivatives and Insurance (LLQP) licenses and is a Fellow of the Canadian Securities Institute (FCSI).

In October 2012, Fairhurst announced his retirement from international rugby with 57 international appearances; the most by any Canadian scrum-half.

Since retiring, Ed has been inducted into the Greater Victoria Sports Hall of Fame, the University of Victoria Sports Hall of Fame, the BC Rugby Hall of Fame and the Rugby Canada Hall of Fame.
