= Aaron Carpenter (rugby union) =

Canada international rugby union player

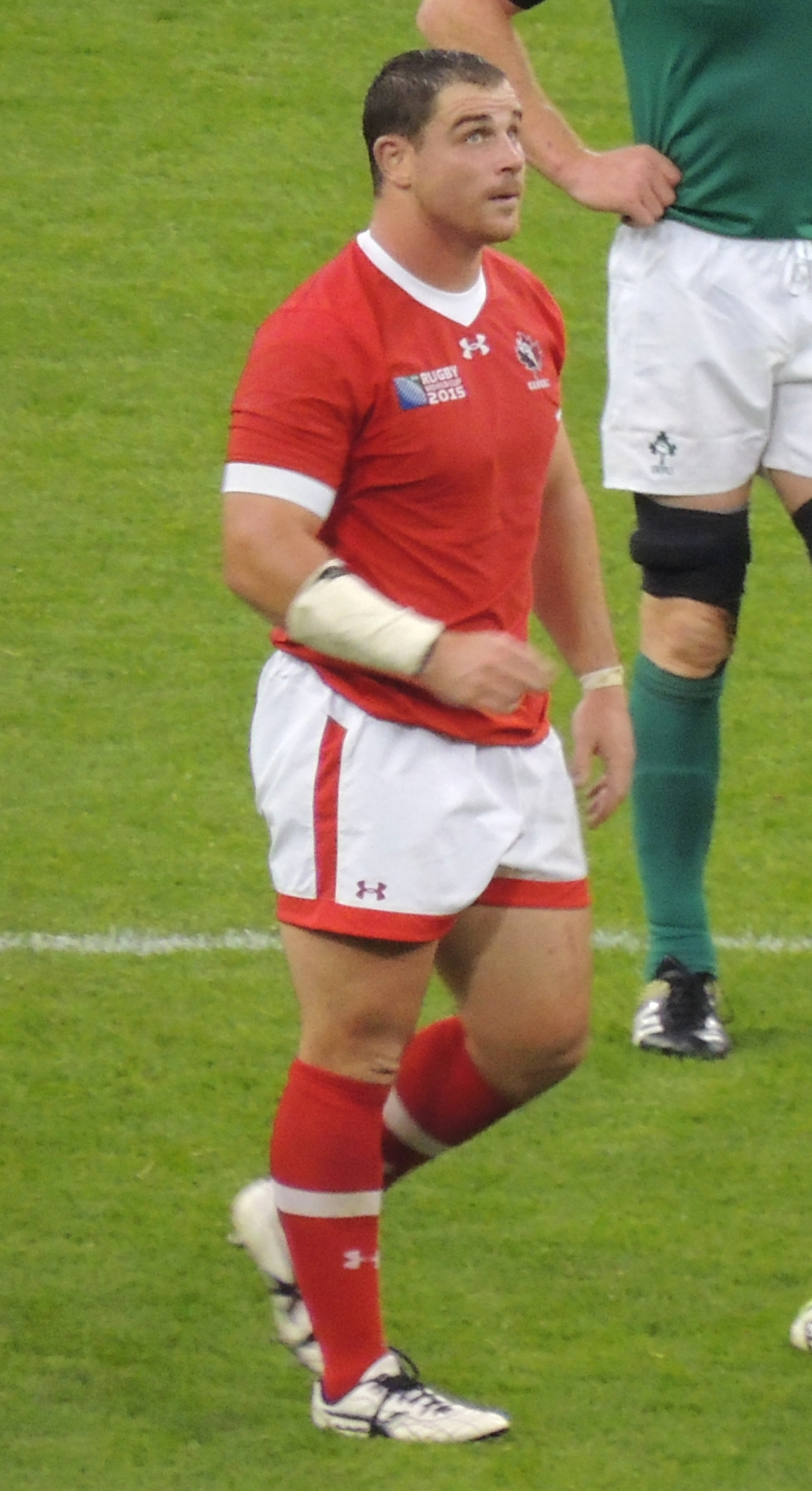
- Born: Aaron Carpenter; 9 January 1983 (age 43) Brantford, Ontario
- Height: 183 cm (6 ft 0 in)
- Weight: 109 kg (240 lb)

Rugby union career
- Position: Flanker / No.8 / Hooker
Senior career
Years	Team	Apps	(Points)
2009–2010	Coventry	23	(35)
2010–2013	Plymouth Albion	61	(85)
2013–2016	Cornish Pirates	47	(85)
2016–2017	London Welsh	2	(5)
2017	Doncaster Knights		
International career
Years	Team	Apps	(Points)
2005–2017	Canada	80	(85)
- Correct as of 22 November 2017
Coaching career
- Years: Team
- 2018-: Toronto Arrows

Aaron Carpenter (born 9 January 1983) is a retired Canadian rugby union player who represented Canada at three Rugby World Cups (2007, 2011 and 2015). He became the Canadian international cap leader on June 17, 2017, with 77. After retiring from play in January 2018, he began coaching the Toronto Arrows.
