= Mike Pletch =

Canada international rugby union player

- Born: Mike Pletch; April 12, 1983 (age 43) Lucan, Ontario, Canada
- Height: 1.80 m (5 ft 11 in)
- Weight: 111 kg (245 lb)
- Notable relative: Dan Pletch (twin brother)

Rugby union career
- Position: Prop
Senior career
Years	Team	Apps	(Points)
- Oakville Crusaders
International career
Years	Team	Apps	(Points)
2005-2012	Canada	940	(0)

Mike Pletch (born 12 April 1983) is a Canadian rugby union player, who plays for the Canada national rugby team. He plays as a hooker. Pletch, along with his identical twin brother Dan, was in the Canada squad for the 2007 World Cup. He is a graduate of McMaster University with a degree in Civil Engineering and Management.
