= Christophe Berdos =

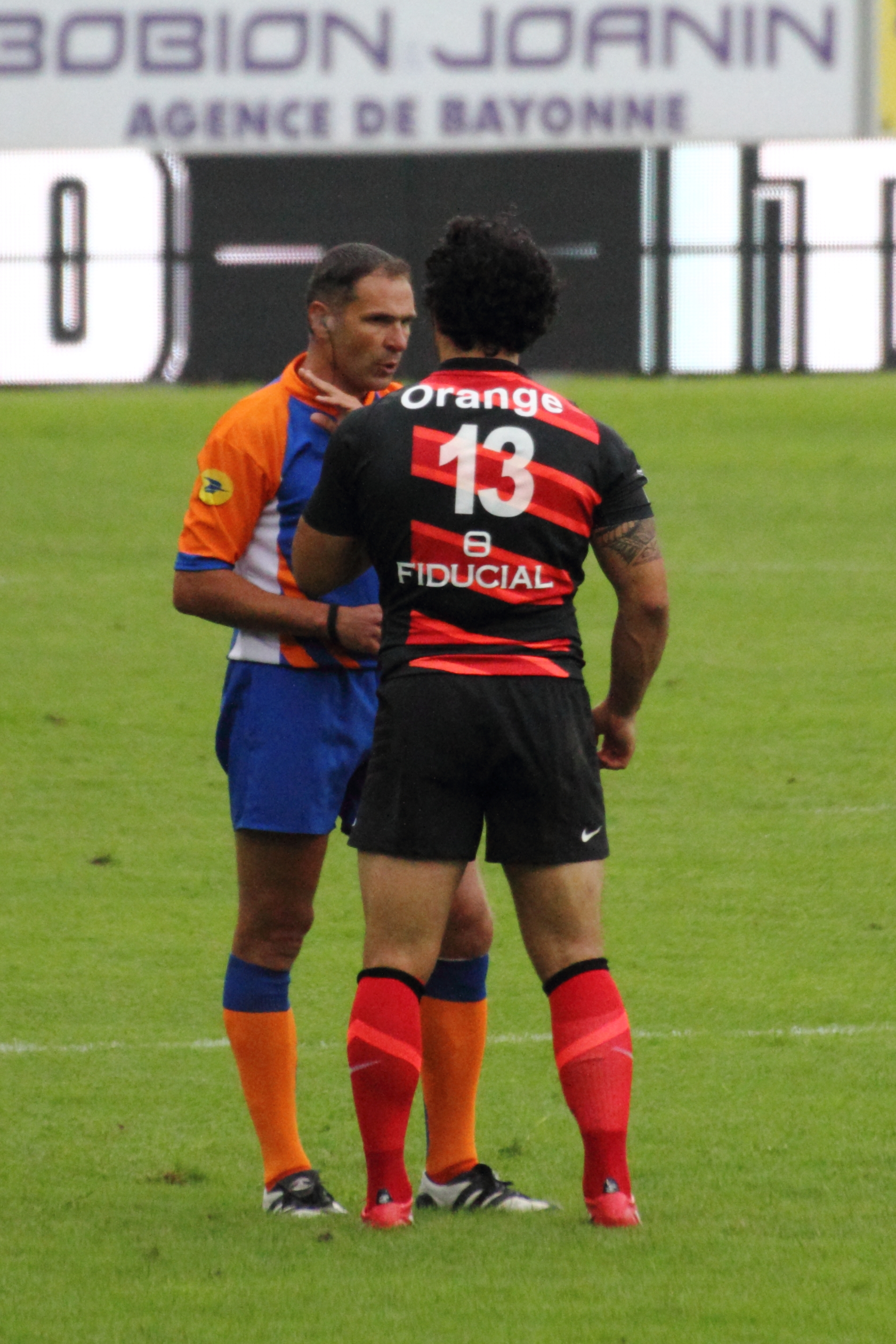
- Berdos (left) talking to Yann David in 2011
- Born: April 17, 1970 (age 56)

Rugby union career
Refereeing career
Years	Competition	Apps
2003-2004	U-19 World Championships	
2006	Test Matches	
2008	Six Nations	

Christophe Berdos (born 17 April 1970) is a full-time international rugby union referee with the French Rugby Federation and is one of the two French representatives on the IRB's International Referees Panel.

Berdos made his debut as a referee in 1988 and refereed in the Under-19 World Championships in 2003 and 2004. He refereed his first Test match, between Samoa and Tonga, in 2006, and was in charge of the world cup warm-up match between New Zealand and Canada in June 2007.

Berdos was one of the 13 referees who were appointed to act as touch judges during the pool stages of the 2007 Rugby World Cup and he subsequently took charge of the game between the Barbarians and South Africa at Twickenham in December 2007.

Berdos refereed his first Six Nations Championship match on 23 February 2008, when he had charge of the game between Ireland and Scotland at Croke Park, Dublin.

He also refereed the 2nd British Lions test match versus South Africa in 2009.
