= Justin Mensah-Coker =

Canada international rugby union player

- Born: Justin Mensah-Coker; 18 November 1983 (age 42) North Vancouver, British Columbia
- Height: 196 cm (6 ft 5 in)
- Weight: 107 kg (16 st 12 lb)

Rugby union career
- Position: Wing
Senior career
Years	Team	Apps	(Points)
2006-2008	SC Albi	8	(0)
2008-2009	Plymouth Albion	25	(30)
2009-2010	Moseley	24	(20)
International career
Years	Team	Apps	(Points)
2006-	Canada	23	(30)
National sevens team
Years	Team		Comps
- Canada

Justin Mensah-Coker (born November 18, 1983, in North Vancouver, British Columbia) is a Canadian rugby union player who plays internationally with the Canada national team. He is of Sierra Leonean descent.

Before spending a season with Moseley in 2009, Mensah-Coker had brief stints with Plymouth Albion and with French club SC Albi. He made his Canada national team debut at the 2006 Churchill Cup in a match against the United States. Canada won the match 33–18 with Mensah-Coker scoring two tries. He was a regular selection for the national men's seven-a-side team through the 2010–2011 season.

Mensah-Coker began his rugby career at Kitsilano Secondary School and Meraloma Rugby Club.
