= Morgan Williams (rugby union, born 1976) =

Canada international rugby union player (born 1976)

- Born: Morgan Andrew Williams; April 17, 1976 (age 50) Kingston, Ontario
- Height: 183 cm (6 ft 0 in)
- Weight: 84 kg (185 lb)

Rugby union career
- Position: Scrum-half
Senior career
Years	Team	Apps	(Points)
1998–2000	Bordeaux-Bègles		
2000–2002	Stade Français		
2002–2005	Saracens FC		
2005–2006	Stade Français		
2006–2007	SC Albi		
International career
Years	Team	Apps	(Points)
1999–2008	Canada	58	(68)
National sevens team
Years	Team		Comps
- Canada
Coaching career
- Years: Team
- 2009–2010: Canada 7s
Medal record
Women's rugby sevens
Head Coach for Canada
Pan American Games
Gold medal – first place	2019 Lima	Team competition

Morgan Andrew Williams (born April 17, 1976) is a Canadian rugby union player. His original playing position is scrum half.

A Cole Harbour, Nova Scotia native, Williams debuted on the world rugby scene at age 23 when he scored two tries for Canada against France during the 1999 Rugby World Cup.

The 183 cm, 84 kg Williams has played professionally with Bordeaux-Begles (1999–00 season), Stade Français (00-02 and 06 seasons), Saracens (02-05 seasons). Williams beat out Christophe Lassuque to gain the starting role at Stade Français, and Kieran Bracken at Saracens. Williams Played 3 times for the British Barbarians, and was selected in the Martin Johnston vs Joan Lomu North vs South game in Twickenham.

Williams has scored 12 tries and 1 drop-goal for Canada in 56 caps. He has participated in three world cups (1999, 2003, and 2007). He has also played a number of times for Canada in rugby sevens, most notably at the 2001 & 2005 Rugby World Cup Sevens and 2002 & 2006 Commonwealth Games. In 2005 against Argentina he captained Canada's fifteens for the first time in his career. After the 2007 World Cup he retired from international rugby.

Morgan Williams was announced as the head coach of the Canadian rugby sevens team in 2009 where he led the team to a top 8 world ranking. Williams also coached Canada Men's 7s to a 3rd-place finish in the Work Games in Cali, Colombia.

In 2012 Williams joined Women's Sevens head coach John Tait as the skills coach for the Women's National Sevens Team, who Finished 2nd in the 7s World Cup and 3rd in the first ever Olympics in Rugby Sevens history. In 2016 Williams was announced as the Assistant coach of the team. Currently Williams has helped the Olympic Bronze medalist finish 1st in Sydney, Australia, 3rd in Las Vegas, USA, 2nd in Kitakushu, Japan, and 2nd in Langford, Canada. In 2019, Williams led Canada to a gold medal at the Pan American games in Lima.

In 2019 Williams was inducted into the Nova Scotia Sport Hall of Fame.
