= Ryan Smith (rugby union, born 1979) =

Canada international rugby union player

- Born: Ryan Smith; September 13, 1979 (age 47) Kitchener, Ontario, Canada
- Height: 1.91 m (6 ft 3 in)
- Weight: 93 kg (205 lb)

Rugby union career
- Position: Fly-half / Centre
Amateur team(s)
Years	Team	Apps	(Points)
- Brampton Beavers
Senior career
Years	Team	Apps	(Points)
2005	Southland		
2005-2008	Montauban	57	(42)
International career
Years	Team	Apps	(Points)
2003-2011	Canada	51	(45)
National sevens team
Years	Team		Comps
- Canada 7s

Ryan Smith (born September 13, 1979, in Kitchener, Ontario) is a former Canadian rugby union player, who played club football for French team US Montauban in the Top 14 division and represented Canada at international level. Smith's first appearance for the national side was on June 14, 2003, in a match against England Saxons. Smith played 51 times for Canada, scoring 9 tries, and appeared in the 2003 and 2007 and most recently the (RWC 2011) earning his 51st cap. World Cups. On December 1, 2011, Ryan Smith announced his retirement from all levels of rugby.
