= Pat Riordan =

Canada international rugby union player

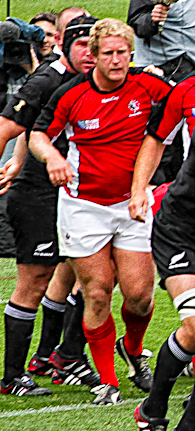
- Born: Patrick Riordan; September 30, 1979 (age 47) London, Ontario, Canada
- Height: 1.85 m (6 ft 1 in)
- Weight: 106 kg (234 lb)

Rugby union career
- Position: Hooker
Amateur team(s)
| Years | Team | Apps | (Points) |
- Burnaby Lake
| – | University of Victoria | | |
Senior career
| Years | Team | Apps | (Points) |
| 2003 | Pontypridd | | |
International career
| Years | Team | Apps | (Points) |
| 2004-2011 | Canada | 43 | (20) |

Pat Riordan (born 30 September 1979 in London, Canada) is a Canada rugby union player. He played club rugby for Burnaby Lake, and for the Canada national side, having also played at Pontypridd. Since making his international debut on June 14, 2003 in a match against England Saxons, he has made 43 appearances for his country, including appearing in all of Canada's matches in the 2007 World Cup.

Riordan captained the Canadian National Senior Men's Team from 2008 to 2011.
