= Dan Pletch =

Canada international rugby union player

- Born: Dan Pletch; April 12, 1983 (age 43) Lucan, Ontario, Canada
- Height: 1.80 m (5 ft 11 in)
- Weight: 109 kg (240 lb)

Rugby union career
- Position: prop/hooker
Senior career
Years	Team	Apps	(Points)
- Niagara Thunder
–	Oakville Crusaders		
International career
Years	Team	Apps	(Points)
2004 -	Canada	26	(10)

Dan Pletch (born 12 April 1983) is a Canadian rugby union player, who plays for the Canada national rugby team. He plays as a hooker or prop. Pletch, along with his identical twin brother Mike, was in the Canada squad for the 2007 World Cup.
