= Dave Spicer =

Canada international rugby union player

David Spicer
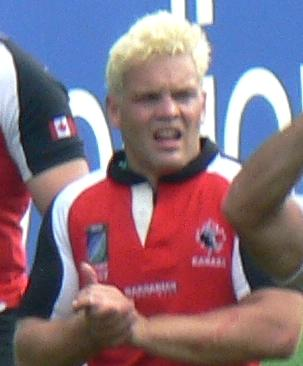
- Born: David Spicer; May 31, 1985 (age 41) Victoria, British Columbia
- Height: 1.70 m (5 ft 7 in)
- Weight: 102 kg (225 lb)

Rugby union career
- Position: Fly-half / Centre
Amateur team(s)
Years	Team	Apps	(Points)
- University of Victoria
2011-	UBC Old Boys Ravens		
Senior career
Years	Team	Apps	(Points)
2007-2008	Auch Gers		
International career
Years	Team	Apps	(Points)
2004-2009	Canada	17	(10)

David Spicer (born May 31, 1985 in Victoria, British Columbia) is a Canadian rugby union player who plays club rugby for the UBCOB Ravens of the British Columbia Premiership and who is also a member of the Canadian national team. The second Spicer brother to don a national team jersey, Spicer is a centre but can also fill in at fly-half.

Spicer made his debut for Canada on November 13, 2004, in a match against England. Spicer moved to Auch Gers in France, a team promoted to the Top 14 in 2007, after the World Cup

Spicer played one successful season in France, and now works as a physician in British Columbia, Canada.
