= Mike Pyke =

Canada international rugby union & Aussie rules football player

Michael Pyke (born 24 March 1984) is a Canadian retired dual-code football player, who was a professional Australian rules footballer with the Sydney Swans in the Australian Football League (AFL).

Pyke is the first Canadian national and the first former rugby union professional to play in an AFL premiership team, having played in the Sydney Swans 2012 premiership-winning side. Before his Australian rules football career, Pyke was a professional rugby union player, having played for French Top 14 squad US Montauban and representing the Canadian national side.

Pyke was known for his understated celebrations.

== Early life ==
Pyke was born to parents Christine Peterson and Richard Pyke in Victoria, British Columbia.

Pyke first started playing basketball, soccer at St. Michaels University School in British Columbia, a school which has produced several Canadian national rugby players over the past few decades, as well as Steve Nash, NBA star, Hall of Fame and 2 time MVP before Mike was convinced to focus on rugby.

As an amateur he was a member of various rugby teams based in Victoria, British Columbia, including the Pacific Sport rugby academy – where he led the B.C. Premier League with 210 points in 2003–2004, the University of Victoria, the Castaway Wanderers and the Vancouver Island Crimson Tide.

== Professional rugby and international representative career ==
Mike Pyke
- Born: 24 March 1984 (age 42) Victoria, British Columbia, Canada
- Height: 200 cm (6 ft 7 in)
- Weight: 104 kg (16 st 5 lb; 229 lb)

Rugby union career
- Position: Fullback
Senior career
Years	Team	Apps	(Points)
2004–2006	Edinburgh	19	(5)
2006–2008	US Montauban	10	(5)
International career
Years	Team	Apps	(Points)
2004–2008	Canada	20	(35)

Pyke began his professional rugby career at the Edinburgh Gunners in 2004. He won his first international cap against Japan, at age 20 the same year.

In November 2006, he signed with US Montauban, where he played alongside Canadian teammate Ryan Smith.

As of August 2007, he has 17 caps for the national side, scoring 30 points in the process.

Pyke achieved fame in 2007 for running the length of the field and scoring a try against the New Zealand All Blacks off an intercepted pass from Dan Carter.

As a rugby player, Pyke typically played on the wing or at fullback, but was also capable of playing most other backline positions.

== Switch to Australian rules football ==
Injuries sustained at US Montauban saw Pyke look for a career change. A friend, Matt Woodland, convinced Pyke that he had all the attributes of an Australian Rules Football player and set in motion the code switch. Pyke put together a DVD showcasing his rugby highlights which Woodland then sent to AFL player agent Michael Quinlan from Top Dog Management. Quinlan was immediately convinced of the possibilities and after speaking with Pyke several times began dialogue with the Sydney Swans, a team known for unconventional recruitment.

After viewing Pyke's credentials, the Sydney Swans offered him a contract. On 13 August 2008, Pyke signed with the team. The Swans had exploited a new draft rule initially designed to provide a pathway for amateur Australian rules players outside of Australia to a professional AFL career. Although there were rules in place to protect the Gaelic Athletic Association and clubs using it for the "Irish experiment", the new AFL draft rule did not preclude the recruitment of talented athletes from other sports such as rugby. As a result, Pyke became the first international sportsperson in VFL/AFL history drafted from a non-Irish sport.

Pyke believed his basketball and rugby background would help him adapt to Australian rules football. With his 200 cm height and 105 kg weight, he saw himself playing as a ruckman and/or defender. Pyke was selected by the Swans as a round 4 (57th) pick in the rookie draft and added to the team's list.

== Australian rules football career ==
Mike Pyke
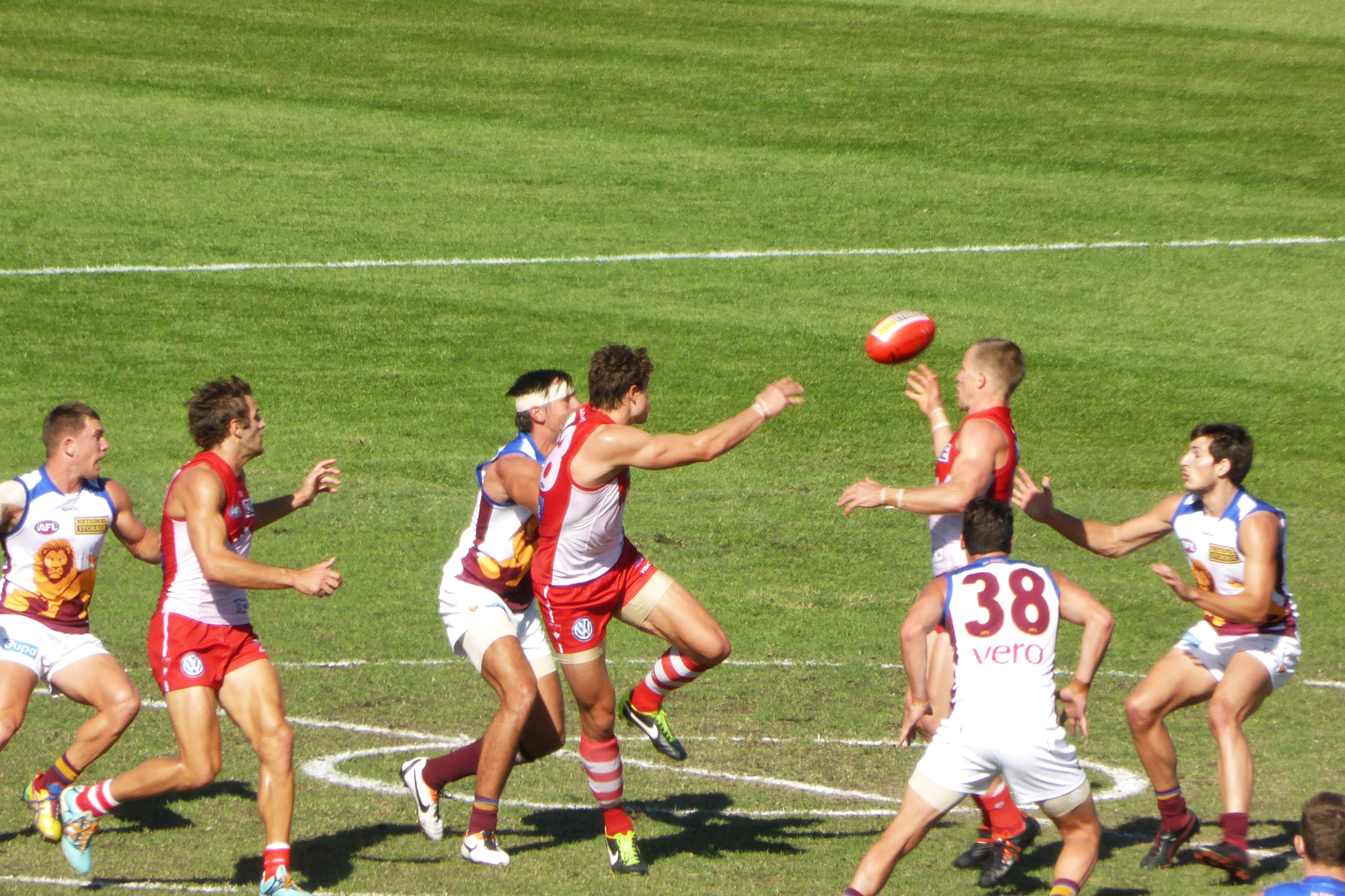

Personal information
- Full name: Michael Anthony Patrick Pyke
- Born: 24 March 1984 (age 42); Victoria, British Columbia, Canada
- Height: 200 cm (6 ft 7 in)
- Weight: 104 kg (229 lb)
- Position: Ruckman

Playing career^{1}
Years	Club	Games (Goals)
2009–2015	Sydney	110 (48)
- ^{1} Playing statistics correct to the end of 2015.

Career highlights
- Sydney premiership player 2012; 2015 AFLPA Education and Training Excellence Award

Pyke made an impressive debut in the NAB Cup match against Port Adelaide. His performance rucking against premiership ruckmen Dean Brogan and Brendon Lade earned him early favouritism to take the secondary ruckman role, supporting premiership ruckman Darren Jolly and make his AFL premiership season debut in the Swans' opening match against St Kilda.

Despite a solid performance in his debut, Pyke's conversion was criticized by some AFL commentators, most notably Brian Taylor, who described the experiment in 2009 as a "joke" and described him as the worst player in the AFL.

He was elevated to the senior list shortly before the first round, leading to speculation he would indeed be chosen, but he was announced on the emergency list for the squad, with Jesse White taking the second ruck spot. In the following rounds, Pyke played for the Swans' reserves side in the AFL Canberra league. After a 20 possession strong performance with the reserves including some strong contested marks and goals, the club raised the possibility that Pyke's debut would take place in the coming weeks.

Pyke finally got his opportunity with the Swans when selected to play in round 6 of the AFL premiership competition against the Richmond Tigers. In 50 minutes of game time, he accumulated 4 handballs, 1 mark, 1 tackle and 11 hit-outs. While his debut wasn't sensational, he showed enough confident passages of play to be considered as a back-up ruckman for the Swans.

By Round 14, 2010, Pyke finally managed his first senior goal, again against Richmond.

In August 2010 Pyke was given a new two-year contract with the Sydney Swans.

Swans' coach Paul Roos praised Pyke, saying he had developed into a genuine AFL ruckman. "This year, if someone came to their first game, you'd have to point out that this is a Canadian rugby player now playing AFL football, and that's the biggest compliment you can give Pykey," Roos said.

The success of Pyke's move to the AFL was further cemented at the 2010 Sydney Swans Club Champion presentation, where Pyke was awarded the Dennis Carroll Trophy for Most Improved Player.

In the 2011 season, Pyke played only two games before an ongoing quad muscle injury kept him off the senior side for the rest of the season.

After missing selection for round one of the 2012 season, Pyke injured his posterior cruciate ligament playing in the reserves. He made his return in Round 8, 2012, to a Sydney Swans starting side destined to win the Grand Final. The Swans added his blog, "Open Pyke", to their website in June 2012 and his goal against the West Coast Eagles was featured as the SwansTV Play of the Day for Round 16. In Round 21 Pyke scored a career-high three goals against the Western Bulldogs.

With the Sydney Swans' win in the 2012 Grand Final on 29 September 2012, Pyke became the first Canadian to play in an AFL premiership winning team. When Swans coach John Longmire substituted primary ruckman Shane Mumford, suffering from a sore hamstring, out of the game in the fourth term, Pyke was left to handle the ruck duties alone. He was recognised as playing an important role in the Swans' win. He was credited with 16 disposals, a career high, and three contested marks, more than anyone else on the field except Hawthorn star Lance Franklin, who took four.

The Swans signed Pyke to another two-year contract in 2012, and he played in all 25 games for the Swans' 2013 season. He took 52 contested marks, more than any player in the competition except Travis Cloke, and he was the Swans' fourth-leading goal kicker with 28. Pyke's success on the field led former Sydney coach Paul Roos to hold him out as a contender for the 2013 All-Australian team. It was to be his best season.

Pre-season surgery and a hamstring injury hampered Pyke during the 2014 season. He played in 19 games, including the Swans' three finals matches. He had a career-best 53 hitouts in Round 17 against Carlton, but his best outing was arguably in Round 19 against Essendon when he had 49 hitouts, three contested marks, six tackles and a goal. On 23 September 2014, it was announced that Pyke had signed another contract to remain with the Swans until the end of 2016.

After a good first half of the 2015 season, in which he averaged 33 hitouts a game, knee problems caused Pyke's form to drop off. He missed four games and averaged fewer than 18 hitouts per game over the last half of the season and the finals. His season overall was characterised as "below par but serviceable" by the Swans.

On 15 September 2015 Pyke, who had recently earned a master's degree in Commerce (Finance) from the University of Sydney, was awarded the AFL Players Association's Education and Training Excellence Award "for his outstanding commitment to his Masters in Commerce and career development."

On 16 October 2015, Pyke announced his retirement from the AFL in typically understated fashion by posting a photo on Twitter of his boots hanging up inside his locker at the SCG. "I got to the point where I didn't think I had any more improvement left in me and that's when you know to step aside and let the younger players come through," he said of his decision.

== Statistics ==
Legend
G	Goals	K	Kicks	D	Disposals	T	Tackles
B	Behinds	H	Handballs	M	Marks	H/O	Hit-outs

Season	Team	No.	Games	Totals								Averages (per game)							
Season	Team	No.	Games	G	B	K	H	D	M	T	H/O	G	B	K	H	D	M	T	H/O
2009	Sydney	38	8	0	1	8	39	47	3	12	98	0.0	0.1	1.0	4.9	5.9	0.4	1.5	12.3
2010	Sydney	38	18	3	2	49	86	135	43	55	292	0.2	0.1	2.7	4.8	7.5	2.4	3.1	16.2
2011	Sydney	38	2	2	0	8	7	15	4	6	27	1.0	0.0	4.0	3.5	7.5	2.0	3.0	13.5
2012	Sydney	38	18	8	8	70	112	182	59	48	384	0.4	0.4	3.9	6.2	10.1	3.3	2.7	21.3
2013	Sydney	38	25	28	8	123	153	276	89	53	546	1.1	0.3	4.9	6.1	11.0	3.6	2.1	21.8
2014	Sydney	38	19	3	6	88	93	181	42	45	525	0.2	0.3	4.6	4.9	9.5	2.2	2.4	27.6
2015	Sydney	38	20	4	4	60	104	164	39	49	519	0.2	0.2	3.0	5.2	8.2	2.0	2.5	26.0
Career			110	48	29	406	594	1000	279	268	2391	0.4	0.3	3.7	5.4	9.1	2.5	2.4	21.7

== Personal life ==
Pyke is married to Florencia Bonet, and the couple had their first child in March 2013.

Pyke became an Australian citizen on 26 January 2014, Australia Day. He earned a master's degree in Commerce (Finance) from the University of Sydney in 2015.

After retiring from the AFL, Pyke went to work for investment bank Moelis & Company. He said of his new job, "it's not as much pressure as the first bounce at a football game and having a 100-kg-plus opponent bearing down on you."
