= James Pritchard (rugby union) =

Canada international rugby union & league player

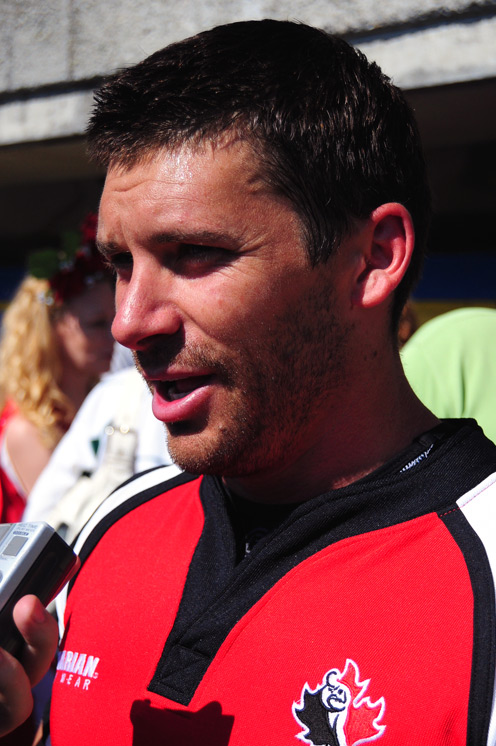

Personal information
- Born: James Gordon Pritchard; 21 July 1979 (age 47) Parkes, New South Wales, Australia
- Height: 1.75 m (5 ft 9 in)
- Weight: 85 kg (187 lb)

Playing information
- Position: Fullback, Wing
Club
Years	Team	Pld	T	G	FG	P
1996–97	Parkes Spacemen
1998	Parramatta Eels
	Total	0	0	0	0	0

Rugby union career
- Position(s): Fullback, Wing, Centre
- Current team: Ampthill
Amateur team(s)
Years	Team	Apps	(Points)
1999-2006	Randwick Rugby		
Senior career
Years	Team	Apps	(Points)
2001-2003	Bedford Blues	51	(630)
2004-2005	Plymouth Albion	30	(319)
2005	USA Perpignan		
2006	Northampton Saints	2	(4)
2006-16	Bedford Blues	213	(2,253)
2016	Ampthill (loan)	4	(32)
2016	Coventry	6	(14)
2017	Old Albanian	7	(36)
2017-	Ampthill	29	(202)
- Correct as of 12 May 2018
International career
Years	Team	Apps	(Points)
2003-2015	Canada	62	(607)
2004, 2015	Barbarians		
- Correct as of 28 May 2017
National sevens team
Years	Team		Comps
2008-2015	Canada		

James Gordon Pritchard (born 21 July 1979) is an Australian-Canadian professional rugby union and rugby league footballer, who currently plays his club rugby union for Ampthill in National League 1 following short spells with Old Albanian and Coventry (where he was player-coach). Pritchard is best known for his time with Bedford Blues, where he spent 12 seasons across two spells with the club, and he is the club's record points scorer with 2,883 points in all competitions, including 99 tries. He is also the RFU Championship all-time top points scorer with 2,673 points from 251 league and play-off games while playing for Bedford Blues and Plymouth Albion (a figure that includes 94 tries), as a fullback, wing or centre. Pritchard has played internationally for Canada, with whom he appeared in four Rugby World Cups, and is his country's all-time top points scorer with 607 points.

== Youth and early amateur career ==
Pritchard was born in Parkes, New South Wales, Australia and started in rugby league football at the age of 13. He played for NRL side the Parramatta Eels in the Under-19 age division after he left school, before changing to play rugby union and joining the Randwick District Rugby Union Club in 1999 and winning the Citibank/MasterCard Cup with them in 2000. In his first year of First grade with the club he also picked up the Ron Don Trophy for Most Improved as well as being runner-up in the Sydney Morning Herald Rookie of The Year Awards. He also finished the top points scorer in the competition with 183 points in ten games.

== Professional career ==
=== Bedford Blues ===
James Pritchard captained the Blues in its 125th Season – one of the most successful in its history when the side finished second in the Championship and made the playoffs semifinals and the final of the British and Irish Cup. He played mainly at fullback or the wing but whatever number he wore on his shirt his authority and influence on the team was clear. For him personally, 2010–11 was probably his best in a Bedford career that started when he was signed in 2001 from the Randwick club in Australia. He broke the club points scoring record with 403, the first player ever to pass 400; he passed 300 for the third time, the only one ever to do that, and he joined Andy Finnie as the only Bedford player to score 2000 points in his Bedford career. James Pritchard first broke the club's points scoring record with 386 in his second season with the club then left to pursue international honours with Canada before returning in 2006 and making an indelible mark on the history of the Blues.

James Pritchard has played more international matches as a Bedford player then anyone save 'Budge' Rodgers. By the end of the 2010–11 Championship season in England he had played 33 times for Canada – 28 of them as a Bedford player – and had scored 332 international points. And he was in such form as captain of the Blues, having just set another record, that more caps looked certain to follow. Add to that 181 appearances and the second highest career total of points in 125 years – including 65 tries – and its clear he belongs among Bedfords all-time greats. Australian born, with a Canadian grandfather and a grandmother from Northamptonshire, he was signed by Colin Jackson from the Randwick club with a reputation as a points machine – and he didn't disappoint, finishing as top point scorer in all eight seasons he played up to, and including 2011–12. In his second season, 2002–03, he broke the club record with 386, in league and cup, in just 27 games, securing the Player of the Season award on the way. His 374 in the league that season was still a record in 2011 when he regained the overall club record with 403. His early success convinced him to try to make the Canada squad for the 2003 World Cup and so he left Bedford to join the Prairie Fire in the Canadian Super League. He made his international debut in a non-cap match against the New Zealand Maori in Calgary in July 2003 and then played in 3 capped matches in a Pan-American tournament in Buenos Aires, Argentina in August before making the World Cup squad and playing against Wales and Tonga in Australia.

=== Plymouth Albion ===
He joined Plymouth Albion in August 2004 and scored 319 points for them in 29 consecutive appearances. His last match for Albion was against Bedford in the 2005 Powergen Challenge Shield Final at Twickenham where he broke his collarbone in the 16th minute.

=== Bedford Blues ===
After 3 years away and with spells at Perpignan in France and Northampton Saints, James Pritchard returned to Goldington Road for the 2006–07 season and scored 303 points in that campaign, and once again picked up the Player of the Season award for the second time in his career. He was recalled to the Canadian team in 2006 setting a new record of 36 points in a match against the US and then played in all four pool games in the 2007 World Cup in France. On 7 May 2011, Pritchard passed the 400 point mark for the 2010–11 RFU Championship season, the first time this has been achieved by a Bedford Blues player in their 125-year history. He finished the season with 403 points. The 2011–12 season was again another successful season for Pritchard, again surpassing the 200 point mark in the league, as well as captaining the side to the s of the Championship for the second year running only to be beaten by eventual winners London Welsh. For the third time in his career he was named Player of the season for the club.

== International career ==
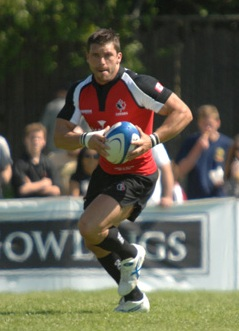
James Pritchard on the run against Ireland in Vancouver, BC.

With a grandfather from Ruthilda, Saskatchewan, Pritchard came to Canada to play for the Rugby Canada Super League side Prairie Fire in 2003, and to pursue a 2003 Rugby World Cup place with Canada. Pritchard made his international debut a few months later for Canada in a non cap match against the New Zealand Maori in Calgary in July 2003 and then played in 3 capped matches in a pan American tournament in Buenos Aires, Argentina in August before making the World Cup squad for the 2003 Rugby World Cup, where he scored conversions against Wales and Tonga.

After a few years in the rugby wilderness, Pritchard was recalled for Canada in 2006, setting a new Canadian scoring record of 29 points in a World Cup Qualifying game against Barbados. He then surpassed that against the United States in Canada's 2007 Rugby World Cup – Americas qualification game in Newfoundland in August 2006, with 36 points from three tries, three penalties and six conversions. In that same year Pritchard was also voted Canada's Player of the Year by Canadian Rugby News.

Pritchard was also selected for the Canadian squad for the 2007 Rugby World Cup, and was Canada's main kicker for the tournament, in which he played in all four of Canada's pool games against Wales, Fiji, Japan and Australia.

In 2011 Pritchard was once again selected for the Canadian Squad for the 2011 Rugby World Cup. Making this his 3rd Rugby World Cup for the Canadians. He played fullback in Canada's first 3 games against Tonga, France and Japan, before being ruled out for selection against the All Blacks due to concussion he picked up in the previous game against Japan.

In 2015 Pritchard was left off of the roster for the World Cup as coach Crowley explained he had more options for kickers who also offered a more versatile fullback than Pritchard. Shortly after that James Pritchard announced his retirement from international rugby. Pritchard has set the record for most points scored for Canada. He has a total of 607 points from 18 tries, 103 conversions and 104 penalties. On 28 September, Pritchard came out of retirement haven been called up to the Canadian squad replacing the injured Liam Underwood.

== Rugby union season-by-season career stats ==
=== Club ===
Season	Club	Competition	Appearances	Tries	Drop Goals	Conversions	Penalties	Total Points
2001-02	Bedford Blues	National Division 1	24	8	0	42	40	244
2002-03	Bedford Blues	National Division 1	26	12	0	49	72	374
2002-03	Bedford Blues	Powergen Cup	1	1	0	2	1	12
2004-05	Plymouth Albion	National Division 1	24	13	0	40	37	256
2004-05	Plymouth Albion	Powergen Cup	4	1	0	9	9	50
2004-05	Plymouth Albion	Powergen Shield	2	0	0	2	3	13
2005-06	USA Perpignan	Top 14	?	?	?	?	?	?
2005-06	Northampton Saints	Guinness Premiership	2	0	0	2	0	4
2006-07	Bedford Blues	National Division 1	25	12	0	60	32	276
2006-07	Bedford Blues	EDF Energy Cup	2	0	0	3	6	24
2007-08	Bedford Blues	National Division 1	23	9	0	29	31	196
2007-08	Bedford Blues	EDF Energy Cup	3	4	0	6	5	47
2008-09	Bedford Blues	National Division 1	20	4	0	53	30	216
2008-09	Bedford Blues	EDF Energy Cup	2	0	0	3	4	18
2009-10	Bedford Blues	RFU Championship	22	5	0	38	36	209
2009-10	Bedford Blues	British & Irish Cup	1	0	0	1	0	2
2010-11	Bedford Blues	RFU Championship	16	6	1	29	39	208
2010-11	Bedford Blues	British & Irish Cup	8	3	0	25	21	128
2011-12	Bedford Blues	RFU Championship	21	10	0	45	26	218
2011-12	Bedford Blues	British & Irish Cup	5	2	0	19	8	72
2012-13	Bedford Blues	RFU Championship	16	5	0	38	27	182
2012-13	Bedford Blues	British & Irish Cup	5	5	0	30	1	88
2013-14	Bedford Blues	RFU Championship	17	6	0	21	35	177
2013-14	Bedford Blues	British & Irish Cup	4	0	0	6	2	18
2014-15	Bedford Blues	RFU Championship	15	4	0	29	13	117
2014-15	Bedford Blues	British & Irish Cup	4	2	0	12	6	52
2015-16	Bedford Blues	RFU Championship	2	0	0	0	0	0
2015-16	Bedford Blues	British & Irish Cup	2	1	0	0	0	5
2015-16	Ampthill	National League 1	4	2	0	11	0	32
2016-17	Coventry	National League 1	6	2	0	2	0	14
2016-17	Old Albanian	National League 1	7	5	0	4	1	36
2017-18	Ampthill	National League 1	29	6	0	53	22	202

=== International/Representative ===
Season	County	Competition	Appearances	Tries	Drop Goals	Conversions	Penalties	Total Points
2003-04	Canada	International Tour	2	1	0	2	2	15
2003-04	Canada	World Cup 2003	2	0	0	2	0	4
2005-06	Canada	Churchill Cup 2006	2	1	0	3	4	23
2006-07	Canada	International Tour	2	0	0	3	5	21
2007-08	Canada	World Cup 2007	4	0	0	3	5	21
2007-08	Canada	Churchill Cup 2008	3	0	0	4	4	20
2008-09	Canada	International Tour	5	0	0	3	7	27
2008-09	Canada	Churchill Cup 2009	3	0	0	6	4	24
2010-11	Canada	International Tour	3	2	0	9	5	43
2011-12	Canada	Churchill Cup 2011	3	1	0	4	4	25
2011-12	Canada	World Cup 2011	3	0	0	4	4	20
2011-12	Canada	International Tour	3	1	0	5	10	45
2012-13	Canada	International Tour	1	0	0	0	3	9
2012-13	Canada	World Cup 2015 Qualification	2	1	0	3	3	20
2013-14	Canada	Pacific Nations Cup 2013	2	1	0	4	7	34
2013-14	Canada	International Tour	3	2	0	4	8	42
2014-15	Canada	Pacific Nations Cup 2014	2	1	0	7	2	25
2014-15	Canada	International Tour	2	0	0	1	2	8
2015-16	Canada	Pacific Nations Cup 2015	2	0	0	2	2	10
2015-16	Canada	World Cup 2015	1	0	0	0	0	0

== Honours and records ==
RFU Championship

- All-time top points scorer: 2,673 points

Bedford Blues

- All-time top points scorer: 2,883
- National Division 1 top points scorer: 2002–03 (374 points)

Canada

- Churchill Cup Bowl winners: 2008
- World Cup appearances: 2003, 2007, 2011, 2015
- All-time leading points scorer (Canada): 607 points
