= List of Canada national rugby union players =

List of Canada national men’s rugby union players is a list of people who have played for the Canada national men’s rugby union team. The list only includes players who have played in a Test match.

Note that the "position" column lists the position at which the player made his Test debut, not necessarily the position for which he is best known. A position in parentheses indicates that the player debuted as a substitute.

== List ==
Canada's International Rugby Capped Players
Number	Name	Position	Date first cap obtained	Opposition
1	Jerry Boone	lock	1932-01-31	v Japan at Osaka
2	Eric Cameron	fullback	1932-01-31	v Japan at Osaka
3	Albert du Temple	flanker	1932-01-31	v Japan at Osaka
4	Campbell Forbes	no. 8	1932-01-31	v Japan at Osaka
5	Brian Hunnings	wing	1932-01-31	v Japan at Osaka
6	Arrol Mitchell	flanker	1932-01-31	v Japan at Osaka
7	Bud Murray	hooker	1932-01-31	v Japan at Osaka
8	George Niblo	centre	1932-01-31	v Japan at Osaka
9	Johnny Rowland	lock	1932-01-31	v Japan at Osaka
10	Ivor Saundry	scrum-half	1932-01-31	v Japan at Osaka
11	Sydney Selkirk	prop	1932-01-31	v Japan at Osaka
12	Frank Skillings	wing	1932-01-31	v Japan at Osaka
13	Tubby Suter	centre	1932-01-31	v Japan at Osaka
14	William Wharton	prop	1932-01-31	v Japan at Osaka
15	Pete Wilson	fly-half	1932-01-31	v Japan at Osaka
16	Jack Bain	flanker	1932-02-11	v Japan at Tokyo
17	Gordon Cox	prop	1932-02-11	v Japan at Tokyo
18	Len Leroy	centre	1932-02-11	v Japan at Tokyo
19	Ernest Pinkham	wing	1932-02-11	v Japan at Tokyo
20	Greg Bjarnason	flanker	1962-11-17	v Barbarians at Gosforth
21	Don Burgess	fullback	1962-11-17	v Barbarians at Gosforth
22	Mike Chambers	wing	1962-11-17	v Barbarians at Gosforth
23	Mike Clark		1962-11-17	v Barbarians at Gosforth
24	Peter Frize		1962-11-17	v Barbarians at Gosforth
25	Peter Grantham	prop	1962-11-17	v Barbarians at Gosforth
26	John Lecky		1962-11-17	v Barbarians at Gosforth
27	Bob McKee		1962-11-17	v Barbarians at Gosforth
28	Buzz Moore	prop	1962-11-17	v Barbarians at Gosforth
29	Vince Moroney		1962-11-17	v Barbarians at Gosforth
30	George Puil	wing	1962-11-17	v Barbarians at Gosforth
31	Glen Stover		1962-11-17	v Barbarians at Gosforth
32	Barry Stubbs		1962-11-17	v Barbarians at Gosforth
33	Dave Ure		1962-11-17	v Barbarians at Gosforth
34	R.S. Wilson		1962-11-17	v Barbarians at Gosforth
35	Bill Granleese		1962-12-01	v Wales Under-23s at Cardiff
36	John Newton	wing	1962-12-01	v Wales Under-23s at Cardiff
37	J.M. Ward	scrum-half	1962-12-01	v Wales Under-23s at Cardiff
38	G.J.M. Wessels		1962-12-01	v Wales Under-23s at Cardiff
39	Brian Williams		1962-12-01	v Wales Under-23s at Cardiff
40	Brian Barker		1966-09-17	v British and Irish Lions XV at Toronto
41	Al Bianco	wing	1966-09-17	v British and Irish Lions XV at Toronto
42	Barrie Burnham		1966-09-17	v British and Irish Lions XV at Toronto
43	Tim Cummings	centre	1966-09-17	v British and Irish Lions XV at Toronto
44	Ted Hunt	fly-half	1966-09-17	v British and Irish Lions XV at Toronto
45	Jerry Lorenz	centre	1966-09-17	v British and Irish Lions XV at Toronto
46	Ross McDonald	scrum-half	1966-09-17	v British and Irish Lions XV at Toronto
47	Brian McKee	wing	1966-09-17	v British and Irish Lions XV at Toronto
48	Dave Milne	lock	1966-09-17	v British and Irish Lions XV at Toronto
49	Geoff Robinson		1966-09-17	v British and Irish Lions XV at Toronto
50	Jim Ryan	wing	1966-09-17	v British and Irish Lions XV at Toronto
51	D. Steen		1966-09-17	v British and Irish Lions XV at Toronto
52	Ray Wickland		1966-09-17	v British and Irish Lions XV at Toronto
53	Tom Bourne		1967-09-30	v England XV at Vancouver
54	R. Brewer		1967-09-30	v England XV at Vancouver
55	Ieuan Edwards		1967-09-30	v England XV at Vancouver
56	Tommy Fraine		1967-09-30	v England XV at Vancouver
57	Gary Fumano	hooker	1967-09-30	v England XV at Vancouver
58	Tetsuhiko Kariya		1967-09-30	v England XV at Vancouver
59	M.G. McKenna		1967-09-30	v England XV at Vancouver
60	L.W. Whitty		1967-09-30	v England XV at Vancouver
61	Tony Wooler		1967-09-30	v England XV at Vancouver
62	Chas Burford		1970-11-28	v Fiji at Burnaby Lake
63	A.E. Foster	flanker	1970-11-28	v Fiji at Burnaby Lake
64	Bobbie Jackson		1970-11-28	v Fiji at Burnaby Lake
65	O. Johnson		1970-11-28	v Fiji at Burnaby Lake
66	G. MacDonald		1970-11-28	v Fiji at Burnaby Lake
67	Spence McTavish	wing	1970-11-28	v Fiji at Burnaby Lake
68	Ken Myhre		1970-11-28	v Fiji at Burnaby Lake
69	Doug Schick		1970-11-28	v Fiji at Burnaby Lake
70	Bill Thomson		1970-11-28	v Fiji at Burnaby Lake
71	Jordan Allers	lock	1971-10-02	v Wales XV at Cardiff
72	Mike Ashton	no. 8	1971-10-02	v Wales XV at Cardiff
73	Garth Henrikson	prop	1971-10-02	v Wales XV at Cardiff
74	Dan Pahl	flanker	1971-10-02	v Wales XV at Cardiff
75	Dave Slater	scrum-half	1971-10-02	v Wales XV at Cardiff
76	Andy Stanton	wing	1971-10-02	v Wales XV at Cardiff
77	Fred Sturrock	flanker	1971-10-02	v Wales XV at Cardiff
78	Ken Wilke	prop	1971-10-02	v Wales XV at Cardiff
79	Stu Barber	centre	1973-06-09	v Wales XV at Toronto
80	Tim Blackwell	wing	1973-06-09	v Wales XV at Toronto
81	Noel Browne	no. 8	1973-06-09	v Wales XV at Toronto
82	Frank Deacy	scrum-half	1973-06-09	v Wales XV at Toronto
83	Dave Docherty	hooker	1973-06-09	v Wales XV at Toronto
84	Geoff Ellwand	lock	1973-06-09	v Wales XV at Toronto
85	Gillie Greig	fly-half	1973-06-09	v Wales XV at Toronto
86	Gudmund Gudmunseth	prop	1973-06-09	v Wales XV at Toronto
87	Leigh Hillier	flanker	1973-06-09	v Wales XV at Toronto
88	Ro Hindson	lock	1973-06-09	v Wales XV at Toronto
89	Barry Legh	fullback	1973-06-09	v Wales XV at Toronto
90	Hugh Wyndham	prop	1973-06-09	v Wales XV at Toronto
91	Bob McGeein	(replacement)	1973-06-09	v Wales XV at Toronto
92	John Billingsley	fly-half	1974-10-25	v Tonga at Vancouver
93	Hans de Goede	lock	1977-05-21	v Tonga at Vancouver
94	Alan Douglas	prop	1977-05-21	v Tonga at Vancouver
95	Mike Eckardt	prop	1977-10-15	v Tonga at Vancouver
96	P. Howlett	flanker	1977-10-15	v Tonga at Vancouver
97	A. Kingham	scrum-half	1977-10-15	v Tonga at Vancouver
98	Mike Luke	hooker	1977-10-15	v Tonga at Vancouver
99	J. McDonald	flanker	1978-05-28	v Tonga at Vancouver
100	Peter Mason	fullback	1978-05-28	v Tonga at Vancouver
101	Geoff Relph	centre	1978-05-28	v Tonga at Vancouver
102	David Whyte	wing	1978-05-28	v Tonga at Vancouver
103	Mike Alder		1976-06-12	v Barbarians at Toronto
104	I. Fleming		1976-06-12	v Barbarians at Toronto
105	Chris le Fevre		1976-06-12	v Barbarians at Toronto
106	Dennis Quigley	scrum-half	1976-06-12	v Barbarians at Toronto
107	Tony Scott		1976-06-12	v Barbarians at Toronto
108	Casey Walt	prop	1976-06-12	v Barbarians at Toronto
109	Keith Wilkinson	centre	1976-06-12	v Barbarians at Toronto
110	Tony Bauer	centre	1977-05-21	v United States at Burnaby Lake
111	Bill Collins	flanker	1977-05-21	v United States at Burnaby Lake
112	Mike Dandy	wing	1977-05-21	v United States at Burnaby Lake
113	Dave Eburne	lock	1977-05-21	v United States at Burnaby Lake
114	Greg Gonis	fullback	1977-05-21	v United States at Burnaby Lake
115	Robbie Greig	centre	1977-05-21	v United States at Burnaby Lake
116	Preston Wiley	scrum-half	1977-05-21	v United States at Burnaby Lake
117	F. Carson	(replacement)	1977-06-04	v England Under-23s at Ottawa
118	Garry Hirayama	fly-half	1977-06-04	v England Under-23s at Ottawa
119	Gary Grant	(replacement)	1977-06-04	v England Under-23s at Ottawa
120	S. Wood	(replacement)	1977-06-04	v England Under-23s at Ottawa
121	Ron Stapleton	wing	1978-05-28	v United States at Baltimore
122	Michael Williams	flanker	1978-05-28	v United States at Baltimore
123	Jim Donaldson	flanker	1978-09-30	v France XV at Calgary
124	Gary Johnston	no. 8	1978-09-30	v France XV at Calgary
125	Ken Peace	prop	1978-09-30	v France XV at Calgary
126	Jack Shaw	lock	1978-09-30	v France XV at Calgary
127	Graham Taylor	flanker	1978-09-30	v France XV at Calgary
128	Larry Chung	(replacement)	1978-09-30	v France XV at Calgary
129	Dwaine van Eeuwen	(replacement)	1978-09-30	v France XV at Calgary
130	Andrew Bibby	centre	1979-06-09	v United States at Toronto
131	Robin Russell	no. 8	1979-06-09	v United States at Toronto
132	Ron McInnes	prop	1979-09-29	v France A at Paris
133	Denny Sinnott	flanker	1979-09-29	v France A at Paris
134	A.J. Carson	no. 8	1980-05-24	v Wales XV at Burnaby Lake
135	Gary Dukelow	prop	1980-05-24	v Wales XV at Burnaby Lake
136	Mark Schiefler	centre	1980-06-08	v United States at Saranac Lake
137	Chuck Shergold	(replacement)	1980-06-08	v United States at Saranac Lake
138	John Phelan	flanker	1980-10-11	v New Zealand XV at Burnaby Lake
139	Garland Jennings	lock	1981-10-03	v Argentina at Buenos Aires
140	Charlie MacLachlan	hooker	1981-10-03	v Argentina at Buenos Aires
141	Ian MacMillan	scrum-half	1981-10-03	v Argentina at Buenos Aires
142	Jim Moyes	centre	1981-10-03	v Argentina at Buenos Aires
143	Bill Spofford	prop	1981-10-03	v Argentina at Buenos Aires
144	Jamie Hawthorn	wing	1982-04-11	v Japan at Osaka
145	Evan Jones	(replacement)	1982-04-11	v Japan at Osaka
146	Paul Monaghan	centre	1982-04-11	v Japan at Osaka
147	Mark Wyatt	fullback	1982-04-11	v Japan at Osaka
148	Tony Godziek	flanker	1982-04-11	v Japan at Osaka
149	John Lecky	wing	1982-04-11	v Japan at Osaka
150	Bernie Bonenberg	hooker	1983-06-11	v United States at Burnaby Lake
151	F. Forster	wing	1983-06-11	v United States at Burnaby Lake
152	Peter MacLean	fly-half	1983-06-11	v United States at Burnaby Lake
153	Ross Breen	prop	1983-10-15	v England XV at Twickenham
154	Zlatko Cvitak	flanker	1983-10-15	v England XV at Twickenham
155	Jim Delaney	centre	1983-10-15	v England XV at Twickenham
156	G. Fraser	centre	1983-10-15	v England XV at Twickenham
157	Cliff Jones	wing	1983-10-15	v England XV at Twickenham
158	Pat Palmer	wing	1983-10-15	v England XV at Twickenham
159	Robert Strang	lock	1983-10-15	v England XV at Twickenham
160	John Vivian	hooker	1983-10-15	v England XV at Twickenham
161	Steve Gray	centre	1984-06-09	v United States at Chicago
162	Matt Kokan	lock	1984-06-09	v United States at Chicago
163	P.A. Kyle	(replacement)	1984-06-09	v United States at Chicago
164	Ian Stuart	centre	1984-06-09	v United States at Chicago
165	Tom Woods	centre	1984-06-09	v United States at Chicago
166	Norman Carr	wing	1985-06-15	v Australia at Sydney
167	Mike Clarkin	centre	1985-06-15	v Australia at Sydney
168	Marius Felix	lock	1985-06-15	v Australia at Sydney
169	Bill Handson	prop	1985-06-15	v Australia at Sydney
170	Tony McGann	fullback	1985-06-15	v Australia at Sydney
171	Randy McKellar	prop	1985-06-15	v Australia at Sydney
172	John Robertsen	no. 8	1985-06-15	v Australia at Sydney
173	Karl Svoboda	hooker	1985-06-15	v Australia at Sydney
174	Dave Tucker	scrum-half	1985-06-15	v Australia at Sydney
175	Roy Radu	flanker	1985-06-15	v Australia at Sydney
176	J.D.O. Devlin		1985-11-16	v United States at Vancouver
177	Eric Kettleson		1985-11-16	v United States at Vancouver
178	Gord MacKinnon	flanker	1985-11-16	v United States at Vancouver
179	Paul Vaesen	centre	1985-11-16	v United States at Vancouver
180	Glenn Ennis	no. 8	1986-06-07	v Japan at Burnaby Lake
181	Rob Frame	flanker	1986-06-07	v Japan at Burnaby Lake
182	Ian Hyde-Lay	fly-half	1986-06-07	v Japan at Burnaby Lake
183	Eddie Evans	prop	1986-11-08	v United States at Tucson
184	Gareth Rees	fly-half	1986-11-08	v United States at Tucson
185	Ron van den Brink	lock	1986-11-08	v United States at Tucson
186	Bruce Breen	(replacement)	1986-11-08	v United States at Tucson
187	Mark Cardinal	(replacement)	1986-11-08	v United States at Tucson
188	Charles Jones	centre	1987-05-10	v United States at Victoria
189	Norm Hadley	lock	1987-11-14	v United States at Victoria
190	Mark Holmes	lock	1987-11-14	v United States at Victoria
191	Chris Tynan	scrum-half	1987-11-14	v United States at Victoria
192	Tony Arthurs	prop	1988-06-11	v United States at Saranac Lake
193	Stuart Creagh	prop	1988-06-11	v United States at Saranac Lake
194	Chris Fowler	lock	1988-06-11	v United States at Saranac Lake
195	A.R. Heaman	wing	1988-06-11	v United States at Saranac Lake
196	David Speirs	hooker	1988-06-11	v United States at Saranac Lake
197	Shayne Brown	centre	1989-09-02	v Ireland XV at Victoria
198	John Graf	scrum-half	1989-09-02	v Ireland XV at Victoria
199	Bobby Ross	centre	1989-09-02	v Ireland XV at Victoria
200	Paul Szabo	prop	1989-09-02	v Ireland XV at Victoria
201	Scott Stewart	fullback	1989-09-23	v United States at Toronto
202	Al Charron	flanker	1990-03-30	v Argentina at Burnaby Lake
203	Dave Lougheed	centre	1990-03-30	v Argentina at Burnaby Lake
204	Dan Jackart	prop	1991-05-11	v Japan at Vancouver
205	Christian Stewart	centre	1991-05-25	v Scotland XV at Saint John
206	Ian Gordon	(replacement)	1991-05-25	v Scotland XV at Saint John
207	Colin McKenzie	no. 8	1992-06-13	v United States at Denver
208	Scott MacKinnon	wing	1992-06-13	v United States at Denver
209	Jeff Knauer	lock	1992-10-17	v England at Wembley
210	M. Williams	centre	1992-10-17	v England at Wembley
211	Kevin Wirachowski	(replacement)	1992-10-17	v England at Wembley
212	Julian Loveday	wing	1993-05-29	v England XV at Burnaby Lake
213	John Hutchinson	(replacement)	1993-06-05	v England XV at Nepean
214	Chris Whittaker	(replacement)	1993-06-19	v United States at Winnipeg
215	Ian Kennedy	hooker	1993-10-09	v Australia at Calgary
216	Ian MacKay	scrum-half	1993-10-09	v Australia at Calgary
217	Ron Toews	wing	1993-11-10	v Wales at Cardiff
218	Ian Cooper	(replacement)	1993-11-10	v Wales at Cardiff
219	Mike James	lock	1994-05-21	v United States at Long Beach
220	Winston Stanley	wing	1994-05-21	v United States at Long Beach
221	Paul LeBlanc	(replacement)	1994-12-17	v France at Besançon
222	Kevin Whitley	lock	1995-01-21	v Scotland at Murrayfield
223	Jeff Grout	lock	1995-03-07	v Uruguay at Montevideo
224	Shawn Lytton	wing	1995-03-07	v Uruguay at Montevideo
225	Danny Nikas	hooker	1995-03-07	v Uruguay at Montevideo
226	Courtney Smith	centre	1995-03-07	v Uruguay at Montevideo
227	Alan Tynan	scrum-half	1995-03-07	v Uruguay at Montevideo
228	Gareth Rowlands	lock	1995-03-10	v Argentina at Buenos Aires
229	Rod Snow	hooker	1995-03-10	v Argentina at Buenos Aires
230	Barry Ebl	wing	1995-04-22	v New Zealand at Auckland
231	Chris Michaluk	(replacement)	1995-06-03	v South Africa at Port Elizabeth
232	David Penney	prop	1995-09-09	v United States at Markham
233	Nick Clapinson	(replacement)	1995-09-09	v United States at Markham
234	Rob Card	scrum-half	1996-05-11	v United States at San Francisco
235	Jim Yeganegi	(replacement)	1996-05-11	v United States at San Francisco
236	Richard Bice	prop	1996-05-18	v United States at Vancouver
237	Jason Hall	(replacement)	1996-05-18	v United States at Vancouver
238	Tony Healy	lock	1996-06-01	v Hong Kong at Hong Kong
239	Dennis Clarke	centre	1996-06-29	v Australia at Brisbane
240	Jeff Tomlinson	(replacement)	1996-06-29	v Australia at Brisbane
241	Scott Bryan	centre	1996-09-14	v Uruguay at Nepean
242	Joe Haley	fullback	1996-09-14	v Uruguay at Nepean
243	Scott Hendry	hooker	1996-09-14	v Uruguay at Nepean
244	Brian Mosychuck	prop	1996-09-14	v Uruguay at Nepean
245	Kyle Nichols	wing	1996-09-14	v Uruguay at Nepean
246	Mike Schmid	no. 8	1996-09-14	v Uruguay at Nepean
247	Jason Penaluna	(replacement)	1996-09-14	v Uruguay at Nepean
248	Brian McCarthy	(replacement)	1996-09-18	v United States at Hamilton
249	John Tait	lock	1997-05-10	v United States at Vancouver
250	Adam Marshall	hooker	1997-05-18	v Japan at Tokyo
251	C. Smythe	wing	1997-05-18	v Japan at Tokyo
252	Kevin Morgan	hooker	1997-05-24	v Hong Kong at Hong Kong
253	Colin Robertson	(replacement)	1997-05-24	v Hong Kong at Hong Kong
254	Joe Pagano	wing	1997-11-30	v Ireland at Lansdowne Road
255	Dan Baugh	flanker	1998-05-03	v Japan at Tokyo
256	Pat Dunkley	hooker	1998-05-03	v Japan at Tokyo
257	Harry Toews	prop	1998-05-03	v Japan at Tokyo
258	Troy MacDonald	(replacement)	1998-05-09	v Hong Kong at Hong Kong
259	Rob Robson	(replacement)	1998-05-09	v Hong Kong at Hong Kong
260	Nik Witkowski	(replacement)	1998-06-06	v United States at Burlington
261	Jon Thiel	prop	1998-06-13	v Hong Kong at Shawnigan Lake
262	Jeremy Cordle	(replacement)	1998-06-13	v Hong Kong at Shawnigan Lake
263	Roger Robinson	(replacement)	1998-06-13	v Hong Kong at Shawnigan Lake
264	Ryan Banks	flanker	1999-05-01	v Japan at Tokyo
265	Fred Asselin	(replacement)	1999-05-15	v Fiji at Vancouver
266	Morgan Williams	(replacement)	1999-07-03	v Tonga at Nukuʻalofa
267	Duane Major	(replacement)	1999-08-28	v England at Twickenham
268	Jared Barker	fly-half	2000-05-20	v Tonga at Vancouver
269	Garth Cooke	prop	2000-05-20	v Tonga at Vancouver
270	Sean Fauth	wing	2000-05-20	v Tonga at Vancouver
271	Ed Knaggs	lock	2000-05-20	v Tonga at Vancouver
272	Phil Murphy	no. 8	2000-05-20	v Tonga at Vancouver
273	Kevin Tkachuk	prop	2000-05-20	v Tonga at Vancouver
274	Adam van Staveren	flanker	2000-05-20	v Tonga at Vancouver
275	Mark Irvine	(replacement)	2000-05-20	v Tonga at Vancouver
276	Nick Milau	scrum-half	2000-06-03	v United States at Manchester
277	Gregor Dixon	(replacement)	2000-06-03	v United States at Manchester
278	Jason Verstraten	(replacement)	2000-06-03	v United States at Manchester
279	John Cannon	centre	2001-05-19	v United States at Kingston
280	Ed Fairhurst	scrum-half	2001-05-19	v United States at Kingston
281	Jeff Williams	fullback	2001-05-19	v United States at Kingston
282	Dale Burleigh	(replacement)	2001-05-19	v United States at Kingston
283	Marco Di Girolamo	(replacement)	2001-05-19	v United States at Kingston
284	Ron Johnstone	(replacement)	2001-05-19	v United States at Kingston
285	Boris Stoikos	prop	2001-05-23	v Uruguay at Hamilton
286	Colin Yukes	(replacement)	2001-05-23	v Uruguay at Hamilton
287	Brad Major	(replacement)	2001-07-03	v Fiji at Tokyo
288	Shane Thompson	(replacement)	2001-07-03	v Fiji at Tokyo
289	Mike Danskin	(replacement)	2001-07-08	v Japan at Tokyo
290	Mark Lawson	(replacement)	2002-06-29	v United States at Markham
291	Jamie Cudmore	(replacement)	2002-07-13	v United States at Chicago
292	Matt King	(replacement)	2002-07-13	v United States at Chicago
293	Leif Carlson	(replacement)	2002-08-24	v Uruguay at Montevideo
294	Quentin Fyffe	fullback	2003-06-14	v England A at Vancouver
295	Dave Moonlight	wing	2003-06-14	v England A at Vancouver
296	Chad Plater	(replacement)	2003-06-14	v England A at Vancouver
297	Pat Riordan	(replacement)	2003-06-14	v England A at Vancouver
298	Ryan Smith	(replacement)	2003-06-14	v England A at Vancouver
299	Aaron Abrams	(replacement)	2003-06-18	v United States at Vancouver
300	James Pritchard	fullback	2003-07-26	v NZ Maori at Calgary
301	Jim Douglas	flanker	2003-07-26	v NZ Maori at Calgary
302	Jeff Reid	no. 8	2003-07-26	v NZ Maori at Calgary
303	Josh Jackson	no. 8	2003-08-23	v Uruguay at Buenos Aires
304	Pat Bickerton	flanker	2004-05-27	v United States at Tokyo
305	Forrest Gainer	prop	2004-05-27	v United States at Tokyo
306	Stan McKeen	no. 8	2004-05-27	v United States at Tokyo
307	Sean O'Leary	lock	2004-05-27	v United States at Tokyo
308	Alby Pasutto	prop	2004-05-27	v United States at Tokyo
309	Mike Pyke	wing	2004-05-27	v United States at Tokyo
310	Mike Webb	flanker	2004-05-27	v United States at Tokyo
311	Tyler Wish	wing	2004-05-27	v United States at Tokyo
312	Mike Burak	(replacement)	2004-05-27	v United States at Tokyo
313	Brian Collins	(replacement)	2004-05-27	v United States at Tokyo
314	Pat Fleck	(replacement)	2004-05-27	v United States at Tokyo
315	Tony LaCarte	(replacement)	2004-05-27	v United States at Tokyo
316	Barclay Luke	(replacement)	2004-05-27	v United States at Tokyo
317	Dan Pletch	(replacement)	2004-05-27	v United States at Tokyo
318	Matt Weingart	(replacement)	2004-05-30	v Japan at Tokyo
319	Mike Langley	flanker	2004-06-13	v England A at Calgary
320	Stirling Richmond	wing	2004-06-13	v England A at Calgary
321	Christoph Strubin	flanker	2004-06-13	v England A at Calgary
322	Derek Daypuck	(replacement)	2004-06-13	v England A at Calgary
323	Dave Spicer	(replacement)	2004-11-13	v England at Twickenham
324	Aaron Carpenter	no. 8	2005-05-25	v United States at Tokyo
325	Dave Ramsay	lock	2005-05-25	v United States at Tokyo
326	Luke Tait	lock	2005-05-25	v United States at Tokyo
327	Ken Goodland	(replacement)	2005-05-25	v United States at Tokyo
328	Ollie Atkinson	lock	2005-05-29	v Japan at Tokyo
329	Brodie Henderson	wing	2005-05-29	v Japan at Tokyo
330	Dean van Camp	centre	2005-05-29	v Japan at Tokyo
331	Kevin Parfrey	(replacement)	2005-05-29	v Japan at Tokyo
332	Simon Pacey	(replacement)	2005-06-11	v Wales at Toronto
333	Kris Witkowski	wing	2005-06-19	v England XV at Edmonton
334	Peter Densmore	(replacement)	2005-06-19	v England XV at Edmonton
335	Casey Dunning	(replacement)	2005-06-19	v England XV at Edmonton
336	Iain Exner	(replacement)	2005-06-19	v England XV at Edmonton
337	Sean-Michael Stephen	(replacement)	2005-06-19	v England XV at Edmonton
338	Simon Rodgers	(replacement)	2005-06-26	v United States at Edmonton
339	Akio Tyler	centre	2005-07-02	v Argentina at Calgary
340	Mike Pletch	(replacement)	2005-07-02	v Argentina at Calgary
341	Adam Kleeberger	(replacement)	2005-11-12	v France at Nantes
342	Ryan McWhinney	(replacement)	2005-11-12	v France at Nantes
343	Scott Hunter	lock	2005-11-19	v Romania at Bucharest
344	Ryan Stewart	wing	2005-11-19	v Romania at Bucharest
345	Justin Mensah-Coker	wing	2006-06-07	v Scotland A at Nepean
346	Chris Pack	centre	2006-06-07	v Scotland A at Nepean
347	David Biddle	(replacement)	2006-06-07	v Scotland A at Nepean
348	Matt Phinney	(replacement)	2006-06-07	v Scotland A at Nepean
349	Mike Barbieri	prop	2006-06-07	v Scotland A at Nepean
350	Ander Monro	fly-half	2006-06-10	v England A at Toronto
351	Hubert Buydens	(replacement)	2006-06-10	v England A at Toronto
352	Craig Culpan	(replacement)	2006-06-10	v England A at Toronto
353	D. T. H. van der Merwe	(replacement)	2006-06-24	v Barbados at Bridgetown
354	Stu Ault	(replacement)	2006-11-17	v Wales at Millennium Stadium
355	Scott Franklin	prop	2007-06-02	v United States at Twickenham
356	Nanyak Dala	(flanker)	2007-06-02	v United States at Twickenham
357	Nick Trenkel	(centre)	2007-09-29	v Australia at Bordeaux
358	Luke Cudmore	lock	2008-06-21	v United States at Chicago
359	Tyler Hotson	lock	2008-06-21	v United States at Chicago
360	Bryn Keys	centre	2008-06-21	v United States at Chicago
361	Andrew Wilson	(flanker)	2008-06-21	v United States at Chicago
362	Andrew Fagan	flanker	2008-11-01	v Portugal at Lisbon
363	Phil Mackenzie	wing	2008-11-01	v Portugal at Lisbon
364	Nathan Hirayama	(fly-half)	2008-11-01	v Portugal at Lisbon
365	Jebb Sinclair	(flanker)	2008-11-01	v Portugal at Lisbon
366	Ciaran Hearn	wing	2008-11-08	v Ireland at Limerick
367	Matt Evans	(fly-half)	2008-11-08	v Ireland at Limerick
368	Frank Walsh	(prop)	2008-11-08	v Ireland at Limerick
369	Sean Duke	wing	2008-11-22	v Scotland at Aberdeen
370	Jason Marshall	(flanker)	2008-11-22	v Scotland at Aberdeen
371	Chauncey O'Toole	flanker	2009-05-23	v Ireland at Vancouver
372	Phil Mack	(scrum-half)	2009-05-23	v Ireland at Vancouver
373	Andrew Tiedemann	(prop)	2009-05-23	v Ireland at Vancouver
374	John Moonlight	(flanker)	2009-06-06	v Georgia at Glendale
375	Doug Wooldridge	(prop)	2009-06-06	v Georgia at Glendale
376	Nick Blevins	(centre)	2009-11-15	v Japan at Miyagi
377	Sean White	(scrum-half)	2009-11-15	v Japan at Miyagi
378	Tom Dolezel	(replacement)	2009-11-28	v Russia at Vancouver
379	Brian Erichsen	(replacement)	2009-11-28	v Russia at Vancouver
380	Mark MacSween	(replacement)	2009-11-28	v Russia at Vancouver
381	Mike Scholz	(replacement)	2009-11-28	v Russia at Vancouver
382	Ryan Hamilton	(replacement)	2010-06-05	v Uruguay at Glendale
383	Jeremy Kyne	no. 8	2010-11-06	v Belgium at Brussels
384	Taylor Paris	wing	2010-11-06	v Belgium at Brussels
385	Connor Braid	(fullback)	2010-11-06	v Belgium at Brussels
386	Mitch Gudgeon	(no. 8)	2010-11-06	v Belgium at Brussels
387	Jamie Mackenzie	(scrum-half)	2010-11-06	v Belgium at Brussels
388	Jon Phelan	(lock)	2010-11-06	v Belgium at Brussels
389	Conor Trainor	centre	2011-06-08	v Russia at Esher
390	Brett Beukeboom	lock	2012-06-09	v United States at Kingston
391	Tyler Ardron	(flanker)	2012-06-09	v United States at Kingston
392	Jeff Hassler	(wing)	2012-06-09	v United States at Kingston
393	Ray Barkwill	hooker	2012-11-09	v Samoa at Colwyn Bay
394	Eric Wilson	(scrum-half)	2012-11-09	v Samoa at Colwyn Bay
395	Harry Jones	fly-half	2012-11-17	v Russia at Colwyn Bay
396	Pat Parfrey	centre	2013-05-25	v United States at Edmonton
397	Liam Underwood	(centre)	2013-05-25	v United States at Edmonton
398	Aaron Flagg	(no. 8)	2013-06-19	v Japan at Nagoya
399	Mike Fuailefau	(wing)	2013-06-19	v Japan at Nagoya
400	Cameron Pierce	(lock)	2013-06-19	v Japan at Nagoya
401	Jake Ilnicki	(prop)	2013-11-09	v Georgia at Tbilisi
402	Benoît Piffero	(hooker)	2013-11-09	v Georgia at Tbilisi
403	Kyle Gilmour	(flanker)	2013-11-23	v Portugal at Lisbon
404	Djustice Sears-Duru	(prop)	2013-11-23	v Portugal at Lisbon
405	Gordon McRorie	scrum-half	2014-06-07	v Japan at Vancouver
406	Jordan Wilson-Ross	wing	2014-11-07	v Namibia at Colwyn Bay
407	Richard Thorpe	(flanker)	2014-11-14	v Samoa at Vannes
408	Thyssen de Goede	flanker	2015-07-18	v Japan at San Jose
409	Callum Morrison	(flanker)	2015-07-18	v Japan at San Jose
410	Evan Olmstead	lock	2015-07-29	v Samoa at Toronto
411	Gradyn Bowd	fly-half	2016-02-06	v Uruguay at Langford
412	Paul Ciulini	lock	2016-02-06	v Uruguay at Langford
413	Dan Moor	wing	2016-02-06	v Uruguay at Langford
414	Clayton Panga	no. 8	2016-02-06	v Uruguay at Langford
415	Lucas Rumball	flanker	2016-02-06	v Uruguay at Langford
416	Mozac Samson	centre	2016-02-06	v Uruguay at Langford
417	Alistair Clark	(flanker)	2016-02-06	v Uruguay at Langford
418	Kyle Baillie	(flanker)	2016-02-13	v United States at Texas
419	Liam Chisholm	(lock)	2016-02-13	v United States at Texas
420	Andrew Ferguson	(scrum-half)	2016-02-13	v United States at Texas
421	Duncan Maguire	(centre)	2016-02-13	v United States at Texas
422	Brock Staller	centre	2016-02-20	v Brazil at Langford
423	Rob Brouwer	(prop)	2016-02-20	v Brazil at Langford
424	Joe Dolesau	(wing)	2016-02-20	v Brazil at Langford
425	Michael Hamson	(no. 8)	2016-02-20	v Brazil at Langford
426	Eric Howard	(hooker)	2016-02-20	v Brazil at Langford
427	Brett Johnson	(centre)	2016-02-20	v Brazil at Langford
428	Jake Robinson	(scrum-half)	2016-02-20	v Brazil at Langford
429	Ryan Kotlewski	(prop)	2016-03-05	v Chile at Santiago
430	Matt Heaton	(flanker)	2016-06-11	v Japan at Vancouver
431	Matt Tierney	(prop)	2016-06-18	v Russia at Calgary
432	Admir Cejvanovic	(no. 8)	2016-11-12	v Ireland at Lansdowne Road
433	Ben LeSage	centre	2016-11-19	v Romania at Bucharest
434	Giuseppe du Toit	centre	2017-02-11	v Chile at Langford
435	Conor Keys	lock	2017-02-11	v Chile at Langford
436	Ollie Nott	flanker	2017-02-11	v Chile at Langford
437	George Barton	(centre)	2017-02-11	v Chile at Langford
438	Matt Beukeboom	(flanker)	2017-02-11	v Chile at Langford
439	Cole Keith	(prop)	2017-02-11	v Chile at Langford
440	Reegan O'Gorman	(lock)	2017-02-11	v Chile at Langford
441	Robbie Povey	(fly-half)	2017-02-11	v Chile at Langford
442	Lucas Albornoz	(flanker)	2017-02-18	v United States at Vancouver
443	Kainoa Lloyd	wing	2017-02-25	v Uruguay at Punte de l'Este
444	Rory McDonell	wing	2017-03-03	v Brazil at Pacaembu
445	Andrew Coe	fullback	2017-06-10	v Georgia at Calgary
446	Shane O'Leary	fly-half	2017-06-10	v Georgia at Calgary
447	Anthony Luca	(prop)	2017-06-10	v Georgia at Calgary
448	Ryan Ackerman	(prop)	2017-06-17	v Romania at Edmonton
449	Josh Larsen	lock	2017-11-11	v Georgia at Tbilisi
450	Luke Campbell	no. 8	2018-02-10	v United States at Sacramento
451	Cole Davis	(fullback)	2018-02-10	v United States at Sacramento
452	Dustin Dobravsky	(flanker)	2018-02-10	v United States at Sacramento
453	Doug Fraser	centre	2018-02-17	v Brazil at Fullerton
454	Martial Lagain	(hooker)	2018-02-17	v Brazil at Fullerton
455	Cam Polson	(flanker)	2018-02-17	v Brazil at Fullerton
456	Josh Thiel	fullback	2018-03-03	v Chile at La Serena
457	Noah Barker	(prop)	2018-03-03	v Chile at La Serena
458	Theo Sauder	(fullback)	2018-06-09	v Scotland at Edmonton
459	Jorden Sandover-Best	(scrum-half)	2018-06-16	v Russia at Nepean
460	Mike Sheppard	(lock)	2018-11-11	v Kenya at Marseille
461	Nakai Penny	(lock)	2019-02-02	v Uruguay at Montevideo
462	Justin Blanchet	(no. 8)	2019-02-09	v Brazil at Sao Paulo
463	Will Kelly	(fly-half)	2019-02-09	v Brazil at Sao Paulo
464	William Percillier	(scrum-half)	2019-02-09	v Brazil at Sao Paulo
465	Peter Nelson	fly-half	2019-07-27	v United States at Glendale
466	Andrew Quattrin	(hooker)	2019-07-27	v United States at Glendale
467	Ross Braude	scrum-half	2021-07-03	v Wales at Millennium Stadium
468	Cooper Coats	fullback	2021-07-03	v Wales at Millennium Stadium
469	Quinn Ngawati	centre	2021-07-03	v Wales at Millennium Stadium
470	Siaki Vikilani	no. 8	2021-07-03	v Wales at Millennium Stadium
471	Don Carson	(no. 8)	2021-07-03	v Wales at Millennium Stadium
472	Tyler Rowland	(prop)	2021-07-03	v Wales at Millennium Stadium
473	Michael Smith	(flanker)	2021-07-03	v Wales at Millennium Stadium
474	Lockie Kratz	centre	2021-07-10	v England at Twickenham
475	Corey Thomas	flanker	2021-07-10	v England at Twickenham
476	Liam Murray	(prop)	2021-07-10	v England at Twickenham
477	Spencer Jones	centre	2021-09-04	v United States at St John's
478	Brock Webster	wing	2021-09-04	v United States at St John's
479	Mason Flesch	(no. 8)	2021-09-04	v United States at St John's
480	Jason Higgins	(scrum-half)	2021-09-04	v United States at St John's
481	Foster DeWitt		2021-11-13	v Belgium at Brussels
482	Isaac Olson		2021-11-13	v Belgium at Brussels
483	David Richard		2021-11-13	v Belgium at Brussels
484	Matthew Oworu		2022-07-02	v Belgium at Halifax
485	Dawson Fatoric		2022-07-02	v Belgium at Halifax
486	Lindsey Stevens		2022-07-02	v Belgium at Halifax
487	Jack McRogers		2022-07-10	v Spain at Ottawa
488	Piers von Dadelszen		2022-07-10	v Spain at Ottawa
489	Matt Klimchuk		2022-11-12	v Netherlands at Amsterdam
490	Josiah Morra		2022-11-12	v Netherlands at Amsterdam
491	Conor Young		2022-11-12	v Netherlands at Amsterdam
492	Kyle Steeves		2022-11-19	v Namibia at Amsterdam
493	Owain Ruttan		2022-11-19	v Namibia at Amsterdam
494	Izzak Kelly		2023-08-10	v Tonga at Nukuʻalofa
495	Mitch Richardson		2023-08-10	v Tonga at Nukuʻalofa
496	Travis Larsen		2023-08-10	v Tonga at Nukuʻalofa
497	Sion Parry		2023-08-10	v Tonga at Nukuʻalofa
498	Gabe Casey		2023-08-15	v Tonga at Nukuʻalofa
499	Reid Watkins		2023-11-18	v Brazil at Spain
500	Nic Benn		2024-07-06	v Scotland at Ottawa
501	Takoda McMullan		2024-07-06	v Scotland at Ottawa
502	Talon McMullan		2024-07-06	v Scotland at Ottawa
503	Jesse Mackail		2024-07-06	v Scotland at Ottawa
504	Brock Gallagher		2024-07-06	v Scotland at Ottawa
505	James Stockwood		2024-07-06	v Scotland at Ottawa
