= 2001 England rugby union tour of North America =

- Coach: Clive Woodward
- Tour captain: Kyran Bracken
Summary
| P | W | D | L |
Total
| 5 | 5 | 0 | 0 |
Test match
| 3 | 3 | 0 | 0 |
Opponent
| P | W | D | L |
Canada
| 2 | 2 | 0 | 0 |
United States
| 1 | 1 | 0 | 0 |

Tour chronology
- ← South Africa 2000 Argentina 2002 →

== Matches ==
Scores and results list England's points tally first.

| Opposing Team | For | Against | Date | Venue | Status | Report |
|---|---|---|---|---|---|---|
| Canada | 22 | 10 | 2 June 2001 | Fletcher's Fields, Markham | First Test | BBC report |
| British Columbia | 41 | 19 | 5 June 2001 | Thunderbird Stadium, Vancouver | Tour match | BBC report |
| Canada | 59 | 20 | 9 June 2001 | Swangard Stadium, Burnaby | Second Test | BBC report |
| United States 'A' | 83 | 21 | 12 June 2001 | Los Angeles | Tour match | BBC report |
| United States | 48 | 19 | 16 June 2001 | Balboa Stadium, San Diego | Test match | BBC report |

== Touring party ==
- Manager: Clive Woodward
- Assistant Manager:
- Captain:Kyran Bracken

== Match details ==
2 June 2001
16:30 Time in Canada (UTC-4)

| Canada | 10 - 22 | England |
| Try: Fauth; Con: Ross; Pen: Ross | | Try: Bracken Lewsey 2 West; Con: Walder |

Fletcher's Field, Markham
Referee: Nigel Whitehouse (Wales)

| FB | 15 | Winston Stanley |
| RW | 14 | Nik Witkowski |
| OC | 13 | Bobby Ross |
| IC | 12 | John Cannon |
| LW | 11 | Sean Fauth |
| FH | 10 | Scott Stewart |
| SH | 9 | Morgan Williams |
| LP | 1 | Rod Snow |
| HK | 2 | Pat Dunkley |
| TP | 3 | Jon Thiel |
| LK | 4 | John Tait |
| LK | 5 | Ed Knaggs |
| BR | 6 | Gregor Dixon |
| BR | 7 | Alan Charron (c) |
| N8 | 8 | Dan Baugh |
Replacements:
| HK | 16 | Dale Burleigh |
| PR | 17 | Duane Major |
| LK | 18 | Kevin Wirachowski |
| N8 | 19 | Mike Schmid |
| SH | 20 | Ed Fairhurst |
| FH | 21 | Kyle Nichols |
| WG | 22 | Mark Irvine |

| FB | 15 | Josh Lewsey |
| RW | 14 | Paul Sampson |
| OC | 13 | Leon Lloyd |
| IC | 12 | Jamie Noon |
| LW | 11 | Michael Stephenson |
| FH | 10 | Dave Walder |
| SH | 9 | Kyran Bracken (c) |
| LP | 1 | Graham Rowntree |
| HK | 2 | Dorian West |
| TP | 3 | Julian White |
| LK | 4 | Steve Borthwick |
| LK | 5 | Ben Kay |
| BR | 6 | Martin Corry |
| BR | 7 | Lewis Moody |
| N8 | 8 | Joe Worsley |
Replacements:
| HK | 16 | Andy Long |
| PR | 17 | David Flatman |
| LK | 18 | Simon Shaw |
| N8 | 19 | Pat Sanderson |
| SH | 20 | Martyn Wood |
| CE | 21 | Alex King |
| WG | 22 | Tim Stimpson |

9 June 2001
16:00 Time in Canada (UTC-7)

| Canada | 20 - 59 | England |
| Try: Baugh Fauth; Con: Ross 2 Pen: Ross 2 | | Try: Noon Shaw 2 Walder 2 Wood Worsley Penalty; Con: Walder 5 Pen: Walder 3 |

Sports Complex, Burnaby Lake
Referee: Joel Jutge (France)

| FB | 15 | Winston Stanley |
| RW | 14 | Nik Witkowski |
| OC | 13 | John Cannon |
| IC | 12 | Bobby Ross |
| LW | 11 | Sean Fauth |
| FH | 10 | Scott Stewart |
| SH | 9 | Morgan Williams |
| LP | 1 | Rod Snow |
| HK | 2 | Dale Burleigh |
| TP | 3 | Jon Thiel |
| LK | 4 | John Tait |
| LK | 5 | Alan Charron (c) |
| BR | 6 | Gregor Dixon |
| BR | 7 | Dan Baugh |
| N8 | 8 | Ryan Banks |
Replacements:
| HK | 16 | Harry Toews |
| PR | 17 | Duane Major |
| LK | 18 | Ed Knaggs |
| BR | 19 | Mike Schmid |
| SH | 20 | Ed Fairhurst |
| FH | 21 | Kyle Nichols |
| WG | 22 | Kevin Wirachowski |

| FB | 15 | Josh Lewsey |
| RW | 14 | Paul Sampson |
| OC | 13 | Leon Lloyd |
| IC | 12 | Jamie Noon |
| LW | 11 | Michael Stephenson |
| FH | 10 | Dave Walder |
| SH | 9 | Kyran Bracken (c) |
| LP | 1 | Graham Rowntree |
| HK | 2 | Dorian West |
| TP | 3 | Julian White |
| LK | 4 | Simon Shaw |
| LK | 5 | Ben Kay |
| BR | 6 | Steve White-Cooper |
| BR | 7 | Lewis Moody |
| N8 | 8 | Joe Worsley |
Replacements:
| HK | 16 | Mark Regan |
| PR | 17 | David Flatman |
| LK | 18 | Steve Borthwick |
| N8 | 19 | Pat Sanderson |
| SH | 20 | Martyn Wood |
| CE | 21 | Alex King |
| WG | 22 | Tim Stimpson |
