= 2005 Canada rugby union tour of France and Romania =

Summary
P	W	D	L
Total
2	0	0	2
Test match
2	0	0	2
Opponent
P	W	D	L
France
1	0	0	1
Romania
1	0	0	1

The 2005 Canada rugby union tour of France and Romania was a series of matches played in November 2005 in France and Romania by the Canada national rugby union team.

== Results ==
12 November 2005

France	50–6	Canada
Try: Bonnaire (2); Bruno; Castaignède; Marty; Michalak; Mignoni; Con: Yachvili (2); Pen: Yachvili (2)		Pen: Daypuck (2)

Stade Marcel Saupin, Nantes
Attendance: 35,000
Referee: Bryce Lawrence (New Zealand)

France: 15. Thomas Castaignède, 14. Aurélien Rougerie, 13. David Marty, 12. Yannick Jauzion, 11. Cédric Heymans, 10. Frédéric Michalak, 9. Dimitri Yachvili, 8. Thomas Lièvremont, 7. Rémy Martin, 6. Julien Bonnaire, 5. Jérôme Thion (c), 4. Lionel Nallet, 3. Pieter de Villiers, 2. Sébastien Bruno, 1. Sylvain Marconnet – Replacements: 16. Raphaël Ibañez, 17. Olivier Milloud, 18. Gregory Lamboley, 19. Yannick Nyanga, 20. Pierre Mignoni, 22. Julien Laharrague – Unused: 21. Yann Delaigue
Canada: 15. Derek Daypuck, 14. Mike Pyke, 13. Ryan Smith, 12. John Cannon, 11. Brodie Henderson, 10. Ed Fairhurst, 9. Morgan Williams (c), 8. Aaron Carpenter, 7. Stan McKeen, 6. Mike Webb, 5. Jamie Cudmore, 4. Mike James, 3. Garth Cooke, 2. Aaron Abrams, 1. Kevin Tkachuk – Replacements: 16. Mark Lawson, 17. Casey Dunning, 18. Forrest Gainer, 19. Mike Burak, 20. Adam Kleeberger, 21. Matt Weingart, 22. Ryan McWhinney

19 November 2005

Romania	22–20	Canada
Try: Fercu; Manta; Penalty try Con: Vlad (2); Pen: Dimofte		Try: Henderson; Williams; Con: Pyke (2); Pen: Pyke (2)

Stadionul Arcul de Triumf, Bucharest
Referee: D. Mene (France)

Romania: 15. Cătălin Fercu, 14. Gabriel Brezoianu, 13. Valentin Maftei, 12. Romeo Gontineac, 11. Ion Teodorescu, 10. Ionuț Dimofte, 9. Lucian Sîrbu, 8. Ovidiu Tonița, 7. Alex Manta, 6. Florin Corodeanu, 5. Sorin Socol (c), 4. Cristian Petre, 3. Petrișor Toderașc, 2. Marius Țincu, 1. Petru Bălan – Replacements: 16. Marcel Socaciu, 17. Cezar Popescu, 18. Valentin Ursache, 19. Cosmin Rațiu, 20. Dan Vlad, 21. Dănuț Dumbravă
Canada: 15. Mike Pyke, 14. Ryan Stewart, 13. Ryan Smith, 12. Ryan McWhinney, 11. Brodie Henderson, 10. Dave Spicer, 9. Morgan Williams (c), 8. Aaron Carpenter (yellow card) , 7. Stan McKeen, 6. Josh Jackson, 5. Scott Hunter, 4. Mike Burak, 3. Garth Cooke, 2. Mark Lawson, 1. Kevin Tkachuk – Replacements: 16. Aaron Abrams, 17. Casey Dunning, 18. Forrest Gainer, 19. Adam Kleeberger, 21. Dean van Camp – Unused: 20. Matt Weingart, 22. Derek Daypuck
