= Brian McCarthy =

Brian McCarthy may refer to:

- Brian McCarthy, Australian comedian and producer, in whose honour the Brian McCarthy Memorial Moosehead Awards were established in 1994
- Brian McCarthy (footballer) (born 1936), Australian rules footballer for St Kilda
- Brian McCarthy (rugby union) (born 1969), Canadian rugby union player
