= Kitiona Vai =

New Zealand rugby union player

- Born: 23 April 2001 (age 25)
- Height: 1.94 m (6 ft 4 in)
- Weight: 103 kg (227 lb; 16 st 3 lb)
- School: De La Salle College, Auckland
- Notable relative(s): Melani Nanai (brother); Cody Vai (brother)

Rugby union career
National sevens team
Years	Team	Comps
2022–	New Zealand	

Kitiona Vai (born 23 April 2001) is a New Zealand rugby union player who plays for the New Zealand national sevens team.

== Career ==
He attended De La Salle College, Auckland. He played for Power in the 2020 Ignite Rugby Sevens league. In May 2023, he joined the Southern Headliners in the Premier Rugby Sevens.

== International career ==
He was selected for the New Zealand national sevens team for the first time in 2020. He made his debut during the Singapore Sevens in April 2022.

In April 2024, he was selected for the New Zealand rugby sevens team alongside his brother Cody Vai, they are the sixth pair of brothers to play for New Zealand sevens side. He continued with New Zealand Sevens for the 2025-26 SVNS season.

== Personal life ==
His father Kitiona Nanai Vai was a Western Samoa international who played in their 1991 Rugby Union World Cup team. He is the brother of rugby players Melani Nanai and Cody Vai. His sister Corina Nanai-Vai is also a rugby player and played in the Farah Palmer Cup for the Auckland Storm.
