= Penaluna =

Penaluna may refer to:

- Elyse Penaluna (born 1988), Australian basketball player
- Jason Penaluna (born 1973), Canadian rugby player
