= Chris Michaluk =

Canada international rugby union player

- Born: November 6, 1970 (age 56) Kelowna, BC, Canada
- Height: 6 ft 5 in (196 cm)
- Weight: 231 lb (105 kg)

Rugby union career
- Position: No. 8
International career
Years	Team	Apps	(Points)
1995–97	Canada	4	(0)

Chris Michaluk (born November 6, 1970) is a Canadian former international rugby union player.

Born in Kelowna, British Columbia, Michaluk was a back-row forward and played rugby for Vancouver Rowing Club. He was one of three uncapped players named on Ian Birtwell's squad for the 1995 Rugby World Cup and made his Canada debut during the tournament when he came on off the bench against host country South Africa in Port Elizabeth.

Michaluk joined Canada teammates John Graf and Gareth Rowlands at Welsh club Bridgend for the 1996/97 season.

== See also ==
- List of Canada national rugby union players
