= Paul Szabo =

Paul Szabo may refer to:

- Paul Szabo (fencer) (born 1954), Romanian fencer at the 1976 Summer Olympics
- Paul Szabo (politician) (1948–2024), Canadian politician, Member of Parliament for Mississauga South
- Paul Szabo (rugby union) (born 1962), Canadian rugby union player
