= Dave Ramsay (rugby union) =

Canada international rugby union player

- Full name: David Ramsay
- Born: December 23, 1977 (age 48)
- Height: 6 ft 7 in (201 cm)
- School: Reynolds Secondary School

Rugby union career
- Position: Lock
International career
Years	Team	Apps	(Points)
2005	Canada	1	(0)

David Ramsay (born December 23, 1977) is a Canadian former international rugby union player.

Ramsay grew up in Vancouver, attending Reynolds Secondary School.

Standing at 6 ft 7 in, Ramsay played his rugby in the forward line and was capped once by the Canada national team, playing lock in a 2005 Test match against the United States in Tokyo. He captained Victoria-based club James Bay and was an integral part of a side that won three successive Rounsefell Cup titles.

Ramsay's younger brother is former CFL offensive lineman Brian Ramsay.

== See also ==
- List of Canada national rugby union players
