= Brodie Henderson =

Brodie Henderson may refer to:

- Brodie Henderson (rugby union)
- Sir Brodie Henderson (engineer)
