= Abbotsford RFC =

Canadian rugby union club, based in Abbotsford, BC

(Canada) Abbotsford RFC
- Full name: Abbotsford Rugby Football Club
- Union: Fraser Valley Rugby Union
- Founded: 1972; 54 years ago
- Location: Abbotsford, British Columbia
- Ground: CFV Exhibition Park
- League: BC Division 1
- 2018-19: Runners-up
1st kit	2nd kit	3rd kit

Official website
- www.abbotsfordrugby.com

The Abbotsford Rugby Football Club is a Canadian rugby union club based in Abbotsford, British Columbia. The Abbotsford RFC was founded in 1972. The top men's side currently plays in the British Columbia Men's Division 1 League, the second tier of the British Columbia Rugby Union.

== History ==
The Abbotsford RFC was established in 1972 and began play in the Vancouver Rugby Union for their inaugural season. The following year the club would join the newly established Fraser Valley Rugby Union.

The club has steadily been building a name for itself in British Columbia rugby becoming more and more competitive each year, however, they have yet to capture a British Columbia Premiership title. Abbotsford RFC was relegated to BC League One for the 2012/2013 season after finishing 8th in the 2011/12 BC Premier League season.

== Facilities ==
The Abbotsford RFC play their home games at CFV Exhibition Park.

== Titles ==
- Rounsefell Cup: 0

== Notable players ==
The following players have played for Abbotsford RFC at some point in their rugby careers and have achieved notability through representation at the international level and/or have gone on to play rugby professionally at a high level.

- Ryan Banks
- John Cannon
- Jared Douglas
- Justin Douglas
- Aaron Flagg
- Brodie Henderson
- Scott Hunter
- Bryn Keys
- Callum MacIntosh
- Ryan McWhinney
- Brian Mosychuk
- Ken Peace
- Mike Schmid
- Harry Toews
- MacKenzie Carson
