= David Penney (rugby union) =

Canada international rugby union player (born 1970)

- Full name: David Nelson Penney
- Born: June 4, 1970 (age 56) St. John's, NL, Canada
- Height: 6 ft 0 in (183 cm)
- Weight: 248 lb (112 kg)

Rugby union career
- Position: Prop
International career
Years	Team	Apps	(Points)
1995–99	Canada	7	(0)

David Nelson Penney (born June 4, 1970) is a Canadian former rugby union international.

Penney, born in St. John's, Newfoundland and Labrador, was a prop who was capped in seven Tests for Canada during the 1990s. He featured on the 1996 tour of Australia and was an unused member of the 1999 Rugby World Cup squad.

Educated at Oxford University, Penney competed for Blackheath and Henley while in England, in addition to representing Oxford University RFC. He played a match for Oxford University against the touring South Africa "A" team in 1996.

== See also ==
- List of Canada national rugby union players
