= Julian Loveday =

Canada international rugby union player (born 1963)

- Full name: Julian A. Loveday
- Born: March 26, 1963 (age 63) Kingston, Jamaica
- Height: 5 ft 10 in (178 cm)
- Weight: 175 lb (79 kg)

Rugby union career
- Position: Wing / Fullback / Scrum-half
International career
Years	Team	Apps	(Points)
1993–99	Canada	10	(5)

Julian Loveday (born March 26, 1963) is a Canadian former rugby union international.

Born in Kingston, Jamaica, Loveday spent his childhood in England before settling in Calgary, Alberta.

Loveday, a fullback, scrum-half and winger, had experience playing in England for London Irish and turned out for Calgary Irish back home. Capped 10 times for Canada, Loveday earned his first Rugby World Cup selection in 1999 at age 36, though he didn't get to take the field during the tournament. He has also represented Canada in rugby sevens.

== See also ==
- List of Canada national rugby union players
