= Gary Dukelow =

Canada international rugby union player (born 1956)

- Born: September 15, 1956 (age 70) Terrace, BC, Canada
- University: University of Victoria

Rugby union career
- Position: Prop
International career
Years	Team	Apps	(Points)
1980–90	Canada	14	(0)

Gary Dukelow (born September 15, 1956) is a Canadian former international rugby union player.

Born in Terrace, British Columbia, Dukelow attended high school in Kelowna and was a varsity rugby player at the University of Victoria, where he was a two-time winner of the team's Howard Gerwing MVP award.

Dukelow, a loosehead prop, played rugby for Cowichan and made his Canada debut in 1980. He competed with the national team until 1984, then stepped away to play in Japan with Kobe Steel. After being recalled in 1990, Dukelow made it into the team for the 1991 World Cup and was Canada's oldest squad member, aged 35 when the tournament began.

== See also ==
- List of Canada national rugby union players
