= David Speirs (rugby union) =

Canada international rugby union player

- Born: June 14, 1961 (age 65) Toronto, Canada

Rugby union career
- Position: Hooker
International career
Years	Team	Apps	(Points)
1988–91	Canada	5	(0)

David Speirs (born June 14, 1961) is a Canadian former international rugby union player.

Raised in Oakville, Ontario, Speirs was a hooker and competed on the Canada national team from 1988 to 1991, gaining five caps. He twice suffered ACL injuries during this time which required extensive rehab and bowed out of international rugby with two appearances at the 1991 Rugby World Cup, including the quarter-final loss to the All Blacks.

Speirs relocated to British Columbia during his rugby career and has remained there since. He is Director of Athletics at Collingwood School in West Vancouver and coached their senior boy's rugby team to a provincial championship in 2018.

== See also ==
- List of Canada national rugby union players
