= Christoph Strubin =

Canada international rugby union player

- Full name: Michael Christoph Strubin
- Born: June 14, 1979 (age 47) North Vancouver, Canada
- Height: 5 ft 10 in (178 cm)
- Weight: 193 lb (88 kg)

Rugby union career
- Position: Flanker
International career
Years	Team	Apps	(Points)
2004	Canada	2	(0)

Michael Christoph Strubin (born June 14, 1979) is a Canadian former international rugby union player.

A native of Bowen Island, British Columbia, Strubin was a Capilano forward, capped twice for the Canada national XV team in 2004. He debuted against an England "A" side in Calgary, then faced the full England team in a Test at Twickenham.

Strubin, a firefighter by profession, specialised in rugby sevens internationally, featuring 98 times for Canada at the World Rugby Sevens. He represented Canada at the 2005 Rugby World Cup Sevens and 2006 Commonwealth Games.

== See also ==
- List of Canada national rugby union players
