= John Robertsen =

Canada international rugby union player

- Born: June 28, 1958 (age 68) East London, South Africa
- Height: 6 ft 4 in (193 cm)
- Weight: 235 lb (107 kg)
- University: University of Victoria

Rugby union career
- Position: Lock / No. 8
International career
Years	Team	Apps	(Points)
1985–91	Canada	9	(0)

John Robertsen (born June 28, 1958) is a Canadian former international rugby union player.

== Biography ==
Robertsen was born in South Africa and moved to Courtenay, British Columbia with his family at the age of nine. It wasn't until he was 21 that he began playing rugby union, having been recruited to try out with the local side in Courtenay. He went on to play with the University of Victoria, James Bay and UBC Old Boys.

A lock and loose forward, Robertsen was capped nine times for the national team, debuting against the Wallabies at the Sydney Cricket Ground on Canada's 1985 tour of Australia. He made the Canada squad for the 1987 Rugby World Cup but injured his knee in a practice match and had to spend the tournament on the sidelines. In 1991, Robertsen made his second World Cup squad and played in two of Canada's pool fixtures, against Fiji and France. A back injury suffered in the France match kept him out of the quarter-final against the All Blacks, which Canada lost 13–29.

== See also ==
- List of Canada national rugby union players
