= Westshore RFC =

Canadian rugby union club located in Victoria, British Columbia

(Canada) Westshore RFC
- Full name: Westshore Rugby Football Club
- Union: Vancouver Island Rugby Union | BC Rugby
- Founded: 1968; 58 years ago
- Location: Victoria, British Columbia
- Ground(s): West Shore Parks & Recreation
- League: BC Premier League

Official website
- www.westshorerfc.com

Westshore Rugby Football Club (Or Simply Westshore R.F.C., or Westshore Rugby) is a rugby union club located in Colwood, British Columbia, on Vancouver Island. The club has the largest junior program on the island and is home to a number of Canadian national men's and women's team players.

Founded in 1968 after a split from James Bay Athletic Association (JBAA), Westshore RFC was founded as Velox RFC. With the tag line "Velox Omni Vincit" Which in latin translates to "Speed Conquers All'. Velox was founded to pursue a new style of play focused on speed, passing, and using the entire field to play.

In 1987, a group of alumni from The University of Victoria joined the club & the club was changed from Velox RFC, to Velox-Valhallians R.F.C.. Valhallians being a sobriquet for the players who graduated from the athletics program at UVIC, whose name was "Vikes", or "Vikings". Valhalla is where Vikings go when they die.

In 2014, UVIC bought the area where the rugby club had been treating out of and the organization had to find a new home. They were able to come to a deal with the board of the then Juan De Fuca Recreation Center; where the club has been located since. When they moved, another change in name came with the club becoming Westshore R.F.C.. A nod to the region known as the West Shore, or the Western Communities.

== Titles ==
- Rounsefell Cup: 0

== Notable players ==
Westshore RFC has produced a number of players who have played representative rugby both in Canada and internationally.

- Kyle Baillie
- Eric Howard
- Ryan Kotlewski
- Nakai Penny
- Nick Blevins
- Andrew Ferguson
- Brock Staller
- Clay Panga
- Tom Dolezel
- Winston Stanley
- Kevin Wirachowski
- Matt Phinney
- Oliver Atkinson
- Bryn Keys
- Mike Pletch
- Dan Pletch
- Dean van Camp
- Mark Lawson
- Todd McBride
- Shane Thompson
- Roy Wheeldon
- Mark Wyatt

== See also ==
- Rugby Canada
- British Columbia Rugby Union
- BC Premier League
