= Simon Pacey =

Canada international rugby union player

- Born: November 21, 1974 (age 51)
- Height: 6 ft 3 in (191 cm)
- Weight: 210 lb (95 kg)

Rugby union career
- Position: Centre / Fly-half
International career
Years	Team	Apps	(Points)
2005	Canada	1	(0)

Simon Pacey (born November 21, 1974) is a Canadian former international rugby union player.

A Fredericton Loyalists product, Pacey left his native New Brunswick in 1996 to attend the Pacific Pride academy, joining the country's top under-23s players. He played for Castaway Wanderers during his time in British Columbia.

Pacey, a back, was capped once by Canada, coming on off the bench for the final 17-minutes of a 2005 Test against Wales at York Stadium in Toronto. This made him the first New Brunswick player to appear for Canada in a full international.

== See also ==
- List of Canada national rugby union players
