= Rob Card (rugby union) =

Canada international rugby union player

- Full name: Robert J.G. Card
- Born: August 7, 1975 (age 51)
- School: St. Michaels University School

Rugby union career
- Position: Scrum-half
International career
Years	Team	Apps	(Points)
1996–97	Canada	8	(0)

Robert Card (born August 7, 1975) is a Canadian former international rugby union player.

Card was educated at St. Michaels University School in Victoria, British Columbia.

A scrum-half, Card played his rugby for Castaway Wanderers and was scouted to play for Welsh cub Llanelli in the 1996/97 season. He was capped eight times for the Canada XV and represented his county at the 1997 Rugby World Cup Sevens, before opting to step away from the game for three years. In 2001, Card made an international comeback in rugby sevens for a series of matches in Asia, which included the Hong Kong Sevens.

== See also ==
- List of Canada national rugby union players
