= Chris Pack =

Canada international rugby union player

- Born: May 5, 1978 (age 48)
- Height: 6 ft 0 in (183 cm)
- Weight: 213 lb (97 kg)
- School: Brookswood Secondary School
- University: University of British Columbia
- Occupation: Equestrian management

Rugby union career
- Position: Centre
International career
Years	Team	Apps	(Points)
2006	Canada	2	(0)

Chris Pack (born May 5, 1978) is a Canadian former international rugby union player.

Pack was educated at Brookswood Secondary School in Langley, British Columbia. His parents had a ranch in Kamloops which gave Pack exposure to horse riding from an early age.

A centre, Pack was a UBC Thunderbirds varsity player and won his first international call up in rugby sevens. He toured New Zealand with Canada "A" in 2006 and gained two Canada XV caps during the 2006 Churchill Cup.

Pack would fund his UBC residency through working at horse shows, outside of the rugby season. He was hired in 2003 by Thunderbird Show Park, an equestrian facility in Langley, where he serves as president and CEO.

== See also ==
- List of Canada national rugby union players
