= Iain Exner =

Canada international rugby union player (born 1979)

- Born: April 9, 1979 (age 47)
- Height: 6 ft 0 in (183 cm)
- Weight: 252 lb (114 kg)

Rugby union career
- Position: Prop
Senior career
Years	Team	Apps	(Points)
2006–08	Section Paloise	11	
International career
Years	Team	Apps	(Points)
2005	Canada	2	(0)

Iain Exner (born April 9, 1979) is a Canadian former international rugby union player.

Exner is a great-nephew of former Archbishop of Vancouver Adam Exner and was educated at Rossland Secondary School in British Columbia. He had a younger brother William, whose 2011 disappearance resulted in one of the largest searches to have taken place in Vancouver, before his body was discovered in False Creek.

A prop, Exner was capped twice by Canada at the 2005 Churchill Cup, coming on off the bench in matches against England "A" and the United States. He played professional rugby in France for Section Paloise from 2006 to 2008, then got signed by the Cornish Pirates, but a calf injury meant he was unable to join the English club.

== See also ==
- List of Canada national rugby union players
