= Shawn Lytton =

Canada international rugby union player

- Born: August 6, 1968 (age 58) Tokyo, Japan
- Height: 5 ft 11 in (180 cm)
- Weight: 185 lb (84 kg)

Rugby union career
- Position: Wing / Centre
International career
Years	Team	Apps	(Points)
1995–96	Canada	9	(5)

Shawn Lytton (born August 6, 1968) is a Canadian former international rugby union player.

Born to a Japanese mother and Canadian father in Tokyo, Lytton was raised in Vancouver, British Columbia, attending Point Grey Secondary School. He returned to Japan to study at Teikyo University from 1990 to 1992.

Lytton, a centre and winger, played his rugby for Vancouver club Meraloma and with the Canada national team during the 1990s. He was a member of Canada's squad for the 1995 Rugby World Cup and gained nine Test caps.

== See also ==
- List of Canada national rugby union players
