= Tony Cordle =

Barbadian cricketer (born 1940)

Personal information
- Full name: Elton Anthony Cordle
- Born: 21 September 1940 (age 86); Bridgetown, Barbados
- Batting: Right-handed
- Bowling: Right-arm fast-medium
- Relatives: Jeremy Cordle (son)

Domestic team information
- Years: Team
- 1963 to 1980: Glamorgan

Career statistics
Competition	First-class	List A
Matches	312	211
Runs scored	5239	1627
Batting average	14.67	13.44
100s/50s	0/9	0/2
Top score	81	87
Balls bowled	42083	9462
Wickets	701	221
Bowling average	27.50	26.56
5 wickets in innings	19	1
10 wickets in match	2	N/A
Best bowling	9/49	5/24
Catches/stumpings	141/0	62/-
- Source: Cricket Archive

Elton Anthony Cordle (born September 21, 1940 in Bridgetown) is a former Barbadian first-class cricketer who played in Wales for Glamorgan.

Cordle moved to the United Kingdom during the 1960s and found a job working for London Transport. He then travelled to Cardiff where his siblings were living and signed up for their local cricket club before being picked up by Glamorgan.

He made his first class debut in 1963, becoming the county's first ever overseas fast bowler and cemented his spot in the side by 1967 after managing 74 wickets at 21 during the season. He was a member of their Championship winning side in 1969 and took his career best figures that season of 9 for 49 against Leicestershire.

In 1979 Cordle was named as Glamorgan's 'Player of the Year' and from 1981 until 1983 he acted as Glamorgan coach before eventually emigrating to Canada.
