= Leif Carlson =

Canada international rugby union player

- Born: August 19, 1973 (age 53)
- Height: 6 ft 7 in (201 cm)
- Weight: 240 lb (109 kg)

Rugby union career
- Position: Flanker
International career
Years	Team	Apps	(Points)
2002–03	Canada	3	(0)

Leif Carlson (born August 19, 1973) is a Canadian former international rugby union player.

A 6 ft 7 in forward, Carlson was a member of the Canada national team in 2002 and 2003. He was capped three times, including a match against Wales at Millennium Stadium. In 2003, Carlson made the 31-man preliminary squad for the Rugby World Cup and was the last player to be cut from the list after Al Charron declared fit.

Carlson played for Delta-based club Brit Lions and had a stint in England with Coventry.

== See also ==
- List of Canada national rugby union players
