= Jeremy Cordle =

Canada international rugby union player

- Born: October 24, 1972 (age 54) Cardiff, Wales
- Height: 6 ft 1 in (185 cm)
- Weight: 200 lb (91 kg)
- School: St. Michaels University School
- Notable relative(s): Tony Cordle (father); Gerald Cordle (cousin)

Rugby union career
- Position: Wing
International career
Years	Team	Apps	(Points)
1998–01	Canada	6	(5)

Jeremy Cordle (born October 24, 1972) is a Canadian former international rugby union player.

Born in Cardiff, Wales, Cordle is the son of Barbadian cricketer Tony Cordle, who played his cricket for Welsh club Glamorgan. The family emigrated to Canada in the mid-1980s and after two years in Alberta would settle in Victoria, British Columbia, where Cordle was educated at St. Michaels University School.

Cordle, a winger, returned to Wales briefly in 1998 to play professional rugby with Abertillery. This would become consequential for his international career in 2000 when it was discovered that it meant he failed to meet the 36-month consecutive residency requirement, meaning he had been ineligible while playing for Canada.

A Castaway Wanderers player, Cordle was capped six times for the Canada national team and made his debut off the bench against Hong Kong at the 1998 Pacific Rim Rugby Championship. He then got a start in Canada's win over Japan and scored the team's first try. After three more Pacific Rim appearances in 1999, Cordle made the Canada squad to compete the 1999 Rugby World Cup, but spent the tournament sidelined by injury.

== See also ==
- List of Canada national rugby union players
