= Josh Thiel =

Canadian rugby union player

- Born: 2 June 1997 (age 29) Victoria, British Columbia
- Height: 6 ft 1 in (1.85 m)
- Weight: 218 lb (99 kg; 15 st 8 lb)
- School: Robert Bateman Secondary
- University: Bishop Burton College
- Notable relative(s): Jon Thiel (father); Jake Thiel (brother)

Rugby union career
- Position(s): Fly-half, Centre
- Current team: Vancouver Highlanders
Senior career
Years	Team	Apps	(Points)
2015–2016	Abbotsford RFC		
2018–2019	James Bay Athletic Association		
2018	BC Bears		
2019	Pacific Pride		
2019–2022	San Diego Legion	8	(0)
2024–	Vancouver Highlanders	3	(0)
- Correct as of 10 August 2024
International career
Years	Team	Apps	(Points)
2017	Canada under-20	4	(0)
2018	Canada A	1	(0)
2018–2022	Canada	3	(0)
- Correct as of 10 August 2024
National sevens team
Years	Team		Comps
2021–	Canada		5
- Correct as of 10 August 2024

Josh Thiel (born 2 June 1997) is a Canadian professional rugby union player for the San Diego Legion of Major League Rugby (MLR) and for the BC Bears in the Canadian Rugby Championship. Josh won his first cap for Canada in the 2018 Americas Rugby Championship vs Chile and has played for the Canada Sevens. Josh is the son of former professional player and Canadian international Jon Thiel and Canadian international Jen Ross

== Club statistics ==
As of 10 August 2024

Season	Team	Games	Starts	Sub	Tries	Cons	Pens	Drops	Points	Yel	Red
MLR 2020	San Diego Legion	1	0	1	0	0	0	0	0	0	0
MLR 2021	San Diego Legion	1	1	0	0	0	0	0	0	0	0
MLR 2022	San Diego Legion	6	0	6	0	0	0	0	0	0	0
RPC 2024	Vancouver Highlanders	3	2	1	0	0	0	0	0	0	0
Total		11	3	8	0	0	0	0	0	0	0
