= Gareth Rowlands =

Canada international rugby union player

- Born: March 12, 1971 (age 55) Cardiff, Wales
- Height: 6 ft 5 in (196 cm)

Rugby union career
- Position: Lock
Senior career
Years	Team	Apps	(Points)
1995–97	Bridgend		
1997–98	Newport		
2000	Pontypridd		
International career
Years	Team	Apps	(Points)
1995–96	Canada	6	(0)

Gareth Rowlands (born March 12, 1971) is a Canadian former international rugby union player.

Born in Cardiff, Rowlands left Wales for Canada at the age of five, growing up in the mining town of Colonsay, Saskatchewan. He got versed in rugby as a spectator watching his father Brian, an ex-Welsh first division player, and relocated to British Columbia after school to play with Velox Valhallians.

Rowlands, a lock competed for Canada at Under-21 and Under-23 level, before gaining full international honours in 1995. He made his Test debut during a tour of Argentina and featured against the All Blacks in Auckland, after which he won a place on Canada's squad for the 1995 Rugby World Cup in South Africa. The only Saskatchewan-raised player in the squad, Rowlands started Canada's pool match against the Wallabies in Port Elizabeth. He finished his career with six Canada caps and also had several seasons in Wales, playing with Bridgend, Newport and Pontypridd.

== See also ==
- List of Canada national rugby union players
