= Bryn Keys =

Canada international rugby union player

- Born: August 29, 1985 (age 41)
- Height: 6 ft 2 in (188 cm)
- Weight: 213 lb (97 kg)
- School: Yale Secondary School; Robert Bateman Secondary
- University: University of Victoria

Rugby union career
- Position: Centre
Senior career
Years	Team	Apps	(Points)
2009–10	Moseley		
International career
Years	Team	Apps	(Points)
2008–09	Canada	8	(0)

Bryn Keys (born August 29, 1985) is a Canadian former international rugby union player.

== Biography ==
Keys is native of Abbotsford, British Columbia and grew up around rugby union from an early age, with his father George being the rugby coach at Abbotsford Secondary School. He was a youth product of Abbotsford RFC and played on the Yale Secondary School rugby team, before moving to Robert Bateman Secondary for his final year of school.

A centre, Keys spent his career with Velox Valhallians, Aurora Barbarians and English professional club Moseley.

Keys represented Canada at the Under 19 Rugby World Championship in 2004 and progressed to earn full international honours at the 2008 Churchill Cup, gaining his first Canada cap against the United States in Chicago. In 2009, Keys broke his ankle, tibia and fibula playing against Japan in Miyagi, which proved to be his final capped appearance. He kept competing at club level until 2011, when a broken neck ended his career.

In 2017, Keys was inducted into the Abbotsford Sports Hall of Fame.

== See also ==
- List of Canada national rugby union players
