= Daniel Cudmore =

Canadian actor and stuntman

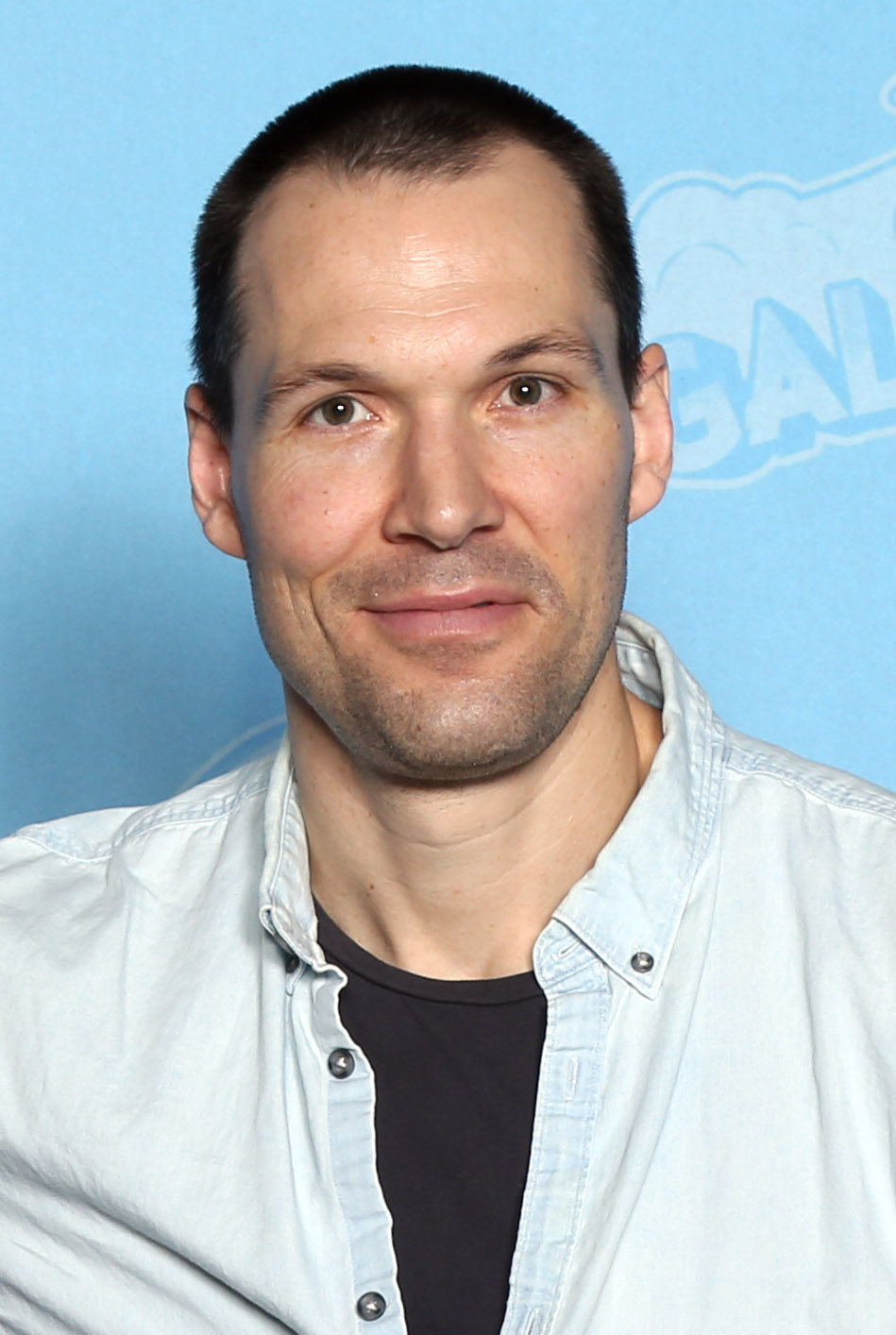
- Cudmore at the 2019 Louisville GalaxyCon
- Born: Vancouver, British Columbia, Canada
- Citizenship: Canada
- Education: Gannon University
- Occupations: Actor, stuntman
- Years active: 2003–present
- Relatives: Luke Cudmore (brother); Jamie Cudmore (brother)

Rugby union career
- Position: Forward
Senior career
Years	Team	Apps	(Points)
–	Capilano RFC		

Daniel Cudmore is a Canadian actor, stuntman, and former professional rugby union player. He is best known for his roles as the superhero Peter Rasputin / Colossus in the X-Men film series, the Volturi Felix in The Twilight Saga film series, and several characters in the Arrowverse.

== Early life and education ==
Cudmore was born in Vancouver, British Columbia, the middle child of three boys born to English-born parents Richard Cudmore and Sue Bailey. His father is a physician, and his mother works for the British Columbia Film Commission. Cudmore was raised mainly in Squamish.

Cudmore attended Gannon University and was a member of the football team (2000–2002). He is a former forward for the Capilano Rugby Union Club in Vancouver.

== Career ==
Cudmore's first major role came in 2003 when he appeared as Piotr Rasputin in the second installment of the X-Men film franchise, X2. He auditioned for the title role in Superman Returns but lost the role to Brandon Routh.

He portrayed the Volturi Felix in The Twilight Saga: New Moon, The Twilight Saga: Eclipse, and The Twilight Saga: Breaking Dawn - Part 1. On July 11, 2012, it was confirmed that Cudmore would portray Master Chief Petty Officer John-117 in the live-action Halo 4: Forward Unto Dawn web series.

Cudmore reprised the role of Colossus in X-Men: Days of Future Past, in which he reteamed with Twilight co-star Booboo Stewart. Cudmore announced on February 17, 2015, that while Colossus would appear in the Deadpool film, he would not return to the role after he declined the offer when he was informed that his voice would be dubbed by a different actor; he was replaced by Stefan Kapičić, who provided the character's voice. Cudmore was initially announced to reprise his role in Dark Phoenix (2019), though his part was ultimately cut.

== Personal life ==
Cudmore's older brother, Jamie, is a member of the Canadian Rugby World Cup team. His younger brother, Luke, also plays for Capilano RFC.

== Filmography ==
=== Film ===
Year	Film	Role	Notes
2003	X2	Peter Rasputin / Colossus	
2004	A Very Cool Christmas	Gym Guy	
2005	Are We There Yet?	Basketball player	
2005	Alone in the Dark	Agent Barr	
2006	X-Men: The Last Stand	Peter Rasputin / Colossus	
2009	Driven to Kill	Young Guy	
2009	The Twilight Saga: New Moon	Felix	
2009	Revolution	Bito	TV movie
2010	Icarus	Hit Man #2	
2010	Merlin and the Book of Beasts	Dragon Knight	TV movie
2010	The Twilight Saga: Eclipse	Felix	
2010	A Night for Dying Tigers	Dave	
2010	Percy Jackson & the Olympians: The Lightning Thief	Minotaur	
2011	Rites of Passage	Moose	
2011	To the Mat	Jordy	TV movie
2011	The Twilight Saga: Breaking Dawn – Part 1	Felix	
2012	The Baytown Outlaws	Lincoln Oodie	
2012	The Twilight Saga: Breaking Dawn – Part 2	Felix	
2012	Halo 4: Forward Unto Dawn	Master Chief Petty Officer John-117	
2013	Percy Jackson: Sea of Monsters	Manticore	
2014	X-Men: Days of Future Past	Peter Rasputin / Colossus	
2015	12 Rounds 3: Lockdown	Gideon	
2015	All My Heart	Tommy	
2016	Warcraft	N/A	
2016	Legends of the Hidden Temple	Thak	
2017	Devil in the Dark	Glen	
2017	All My Heart: Inn Love	Tommy	
2018	All My Heart: The Wedding	Tommy	
2019	Playing with Fire	Burly Smoke Jumper #1	
2022	Corrective Measures	Diamond Jim	

=== Television ===
Year	Television	Role	Episode
2003	Stargate SG-1	Jaffa #1	Episode: "Homecoming"
2004	The Collector	Little Man #3	Episode: "The Miniaturist"
2007	Masters of Horror	Deputy #2	Episode: "The Washingtonians"
2008	The Backshop Show	Chuck	Episode: "Why Do They Call You 'Reach'?"
2012	Fringe	Daniel Hicks	Episode: "Nothing as It Seems"
2013	The True Heroines	Harold	Episode: "What'll I Do?"
2015	Comedy Bang! Bang!	Deadeye Darrell Dean	Episode: "Jack Black Wears an Embroidered Cowboy Shirt and Ox Blood Sneakers"
2016	Arrow	Jackhammer	Episode: "Code of Silence"
2016	Fresh Off the Boat	Bogdan Dragomir	Episode: "Breaking Chains"
2018	The Flash	William Lang / Gridlock	2 episodes
2018–2019	Legends of Tomorrow	Minotaur	3 episodes
2019	Siren	Bryan	Recurring role
2020	Helstrom	Keith Spivey / Basar	Recurring role; 6 episodes
2021–2022	Superman & Lois	David Fuglestad	Episode: "The Perks of Not Being a Wallflower" (season 1)
2021–2022	Superman & Lois	Bizarro (full armored appearance)	2 episodes (season 2)
2021	Charmed	Golem	Episode: "Perfecti is the Enemy of Good"
2021	Supergirl	Bodyguard	Episode: "Blind Spots"; uncredited
2024	Love at the Bootcamp	N/A	TV movie
2024	Fire Country	Bobby Bro	Episode: "Edgewater's About to Get Real Cozy"
2025	Percy Jackson and the Olympians	Skull Eater	2 episodes

=== Stunts ===
Year	Television	Role	Notes
2007	Aliens vs Predator: Requiem		
2008	Supernatural	Stunt performer	Episode: "I Know What You Did Last Summer"
2009	Psych	Stunt performer	Episode: "Lassie Did a Bad, Bad Thing"
2009	Knights of Bloodsteel	Stunt performer	
2009	Driven to Kill	Stunt actor	
2009	The Hole	Stunt double: Monster Dad	
2010	Merlin and the Book of Beasts	Stunt performer	
2012	True Justice	Stunt actor: Thug #4	Episode: "Street Wars: Part 1"
2019	Dark Phoenix	Stunt performer	
