= Ron Toews =

Canada international rugby union player

- Born: April 28, 1969 (age 57) Winnipeg, MB, Canada
- Height: 6 ft 1 in (185 cm)
- School: Semiahmoo Secondary School
- University: University of British Columbia

Rugby union career
- Position: Centre / Wing
International career
Years	Team	Apps	(Points)
1993–97	Canada	16	(0)

Ron Toews (born April 28, 1969) is a Canadian former international rugby union player.

Toews was born in Winnipeg and grew up in British Columbia, where he attended Semiahmoo Secondary School.

A centre and winger, Toews competed for Vancouver club Meraloma and was a varsity player with UBC. He debuted for Canada in their win over Wales at Cardiff in 1993 and was capped 16 times during his career. In 1995, Toews was a member of the Canadian squad at the Rugby World Cup in South Africa, but never got to take the field. He also represented Canada at the 1997 Rugby World Cup Sevens in Hong Kong.

== See also ==
- List of Canada national rugby union players
