= Kevin Whitley (rugby union) =

Canada international rugby union player

- Full name: Kevin William Whitley
- Born: August 12, 1969 (age 57) Bandar Seri Begawan, Brunei
- Height: 6 ft 6 in (198 cm)
- Weight: 246 lb (112 kg)

Rugby union career
- Position: Lock
International career
Years	Team	Apps	(Points)
1995	Canada	1	(0)

Kevin William Whitley (born August 12, 1969) is a Canadian former international rugby union player.

Whitley was born in Brunei and raised in Australia.

A 6 ft 6 in lock, Whitley was a specialist line-out jumper, who played in Canada for Calgary Irish and Capilano.

In 1995, Whitley gained his solitary Canada cap in a Test against Scotland at Murrayfield. His match ended early when he tore an anterior cruciate ligament late in the first half, taking him out of contention for the upcoming Rugby World Cup.

Whitley played overseas with Coventry, Moseley, Rugby Calvisano and Stade Français.

== See also ==
- List of Canada national rugby union players
