= Cody Vai =

New Zealand rugby union player

- Full name: Codemeru Nanai Vai
- Born: 25 February 2004 (age 22)
- Height: 1.88 m (6 ft 2 in)
- Weight: 86 kg (190 lb; 13 st 8 lb)
- School: De La Salle College, Auckland; St Peter's College, Cambridge
- Notable relative: Melani Nanai (brother)

Rugby union career
- Position: Wing
- Current team: Blues
Senior career
| Years | Team | Apps | (Points) |
| 2023– | Bay of Plenty | | |
| 2025 | Auckland | | |
National sevens team
| Years | Team | | Comps |
| 2023– | New Zealand | | |

Codemeru ”Cody” Nanai Vai (born 25 February 2004) is a New Zealand professional rugby union player who plays as a wing for Super Rugby side Blues. He previously played for National Provincial Championship clubs Bay of Plenty and Auckland. He is a New Zealand sevens international.

== Early and personal life ==
His father Kitiona Nanai Vai was a Western Samoa international who played in their 1991 Rugby Union World Cup team. He is the younger brother of rugby players Melani Nanai and Kitiona Vai. His sister Corina Nanai-Vai is also a rugby player and played in the Farah Palmer Cup for the Auckland Storm. He attended De La Salle College, Auckland. He also attended St Peter's School, Cambridge on a scholarship.

== Career ==
He plays for Bay of Plenty as a winger and also played for the Chiefs U20 side. Vai joined the New Zealand national rugby sevens team as injury cover in 2023 and scored a try on debut. He played as they won the Hong Kong Sevens title in 2023, scoring a try after just 25 seconds in the final against Fiji.

He was a member of the New Zealand Sevens team that retained the Hong Kong title in 2024, scoring a try in the final as they beat France 10-7. He continued to play for New Zealand in the 2024-25 SVNS series. He made his debut for Auckland in the National Provincial Championship in July 2025.

Ahead of the 2026 season, Vai left the New Zealand Rugby Sevens programme and signed for Super Rugby side Blues. On his first start for the Blues in March 2026, he scored an acrobatic try from a cross-field kick from Beauden Barrett.
