= Barclay Luke =

Canada international rugby union player

- Born: October 30, 1976 (age 50)
- Height: 6 ft 0 in (183 cm)
- Weight: 205 lb (93 kg)
- School: Brantford Collegiate Institute
- University: York University

Rugby union career
- Position: Centre / Fullback
International career
Years	Team	Apps	(Points)
2004	Canada	2	(0)

Barclay Luke (born October 30, 1976) is a Canadian former international rugby union player.

Raised in Brantford, Ontario, Luke attended Brantford Collegiate Institute and played in their 1994 all-Ontario junior championship-winning team. He played his local club rugby for the Brantford Harlequins, where future Canada caps leader Aaron Carpenter was a teammate, while also competing in varsity rugby at York University for two years, earning All-Star honours in 1996 and 1997.

Luke, an outside centre and fullback, trained in British Columbia with the Pacific Pride and in 2001 became the first Brantford product since the 1970s to play international rugby when he was capped for the Canada Sevens team. He also won a call up to the Canada XV for a tour of Japan that year, but had to spend the trip quarantined after contracting the flu. His next opportunity came on a repeat visit to Tokyo in 2003, when he came on off the bench to gain caps in Tests against the United States and Japan.

== See also ==
- List of Canada national rugby union players
