= Luke Cudmore =

Canada international rugby union player

- Born: September 5, 1984 (age 42) Squamish, BC, Canada
- Height: 6 ft 7 in (201 cm)
- Weight: 252 lb (114 kg)

Rugby union career
- Position: Lock
International career
Years	Team	Apps	(Points)
2008	Canada	1	(0)

Luke Cudmore (born September 5, 1984) is a Canadian former international rugby union player.

Born and raised in Squamish, British Columbia, Cudmore is the younger brother of actor Daniel Cudmore and rugby international Jamie Cudmore. He was educated at West Vancouver Secondary School.

Cudmore went through the London Irish, ASM Clermont Auvergne and WRU Northwest academies.

A 6 ft 7 in lock, Cudmore played his rugby for West Vancouver club Capilano RFC and was capped for the Canada national team against the United States in a 2008 Churchill Cup match in Chicago.

== See also ==
- List of Canada national rugby union players
