= Dryworld =

Canadian sportswear company

Dryworld Brands Inc.
- Type: Public IBGR
- Traded as: OTCID Basic: IBGR
- Industry: Sports equipment
- Founded: 2010
- Founder: Matt Weingart and Brian McKenzie
- Headquarters: Victoria, British Columbia, Canada
- Area served: Worldwide
- Products: Sportswear, footwear
- Website: thedryworld.com

Dryworld Brands Inc. OTC:IBGR is a Canadian athletic footwear and apparel company based in Victoria, BC, Canada. The company does independent lab testing at the Sport Innovation Centre (SPIN), a division of the Canadian Sport Institute.

== History ==
The company was started in 2010 by two former rugby players Matt Weingart and Brian McKenzie. After retiring, the two put together an idea to create a product intended to allow athletes to keep their feet warm and dry during outdoor sports such as soccer, football, and rugby. They developed an exterior shoe product called dryfeet that is rolled over footwear such as soccer shoes and aims to reduce the weight of the shoes during wet and cold conditions. The company has since produced several lines of clothing.

== Sponsorship ==
In 2016 it was announced that Dryworld reached the deal to sponsor Brazilian soccer clubs Fluminense, Goiás and Atlético Mineiro. Goiás was the first club to officially present the kit and wear it during competitive games. On 3 February 2016, Santa Cruz have also announced their partnership with Dryworld, although this information is yet to be confirmed by the company.

All of these clubs subsequently exited their agreements with Dryworld in late 2016 and early 2017.

In July 2016, Dryworld announced deals with English soccer clubs Watford and Queens Park Rangers for the 2016–17 Premier League and 2016–17 Championship seasons respectively.

By January 2017 however, both clubs had announced deals with new suppliers. At that time, QPR were considering legal action against Dryworld for breach of contract related to failed payments and late delivery of merchandise, forcing players to use equipment from a previous arrangement with Nike.

In December 2020, Dryworld completed a reverse merger with Nexus Energy Services to become a publicly traded company. It has filed with the Financial Industry Regulatory Authority for approval to change its ticker symbol from IBGR to DRYW.

=== Association football (soccer) ===
==== Players ====
- (Brazil) Luan
- (Brazil) Ronaldinho

=== Basketball ===
- (United States) Braden Smith

=== Boxing ===
- (Canada) Samuel Vargas

=== Gridiron football ===
==== National teams ====
- The Netherlands

==== Players ====
- (Canada) Rolly Lumbala
- (United States) Ronnie Yell
- (United States) Trente Jones

=== Rugby Union ===
==== Associations/Leagues ====
- (New Zealand) Super Rugby Aupiki

==== Club teams ====
- (Wales) Ospreys

=== Athletics ===
- (Russia) Darya Klishina

=== Events ===
- Super League Triathlon
