= Ian Gordon (rugby union) =

Canada international rugby union player

- Full name: Ian Christopher Gordon
- Born: March 12, 1968 (age 58) Vancouver, Canada
- Height: 6 ft 4 in (193 cm)
- Weight: 234 lb (106 kg)

Rugby union career
- Position(s): Flanker, #8, 2nd row
International career
| Years | Team | Apps | (Points) |
| 1990–98 | Canada Jr canada | 31 | (0) |

Ian Christopher Gordon (born Feb. 11, 1966) is a Canadian former international rugby union player.

Born in Vancouver, Gordon is the son of actor Peter Gordon, whose credits included the 1970 sports film The Great White Hope and episodes of I Dream of Jeannie. He has Scottish and South African ancestry on his father's side.

Gordon was originally a football player, named the CFJL's "outstanding defensive player" for 1986, while competing with Victoria Payless. He joined CFL team BC Lions in 1987 but wasn't able to establish himself in the side due to injuries.

A loose forward, Gordon competed on the Canada Jr. and senior national rugby union team during the 1980's and 1990s. His career included a match against England at Wembley Stadium in 1992 and a 1995 Rugby World Cup fixture against the Springboks in Port Elizabeth. He played his Canadian rugby with James Bay and he also had a stint in England at Nottingham.

== See also ==
- List of Canada national rugby union players
