= Vancouver Highlanders =

Canadian rugby union club, based in Vancouver

- Full name: Vancouver Highlanders
- Union: Rugby Canada
- Founded: 2023; 3 years ago
- Location: Vancouver, British Columbia, Canada
- Region: British Columbia
- Ground: Burnaby Lake Rugby Club
- CEO: Curry Hitchborn
- Director of Rugby: Randall Barton
- Coach: Tom Larisch
- Captain: Josh Thiel
- Top scorer: Takoda McMullin (39)
- Most tries: Melani Nanai (4)
- League: Rugby Players Challenge Summer Series
- 2024: n/a

Official website
- vancouverhighlanders.com

The Vancouver Highlanders are a semi-professional rugby union team based in Vancouver, British Columbia, Canada.

== History ==
Founded by Curry Hitchborn and Ralph McRae in 2023, with their first game coming in June 2024 a double header against the Barbados national side and a Canada Select 'XV'. Ralph McRae is the financial backing of the club. Players who sign on will be guided to play for local clubs during the regular British Columbia season, as the Highlanders will play in the traditional rugby off season not playing in a conventional rugby league instead playing on the Rugby Players’ Challenge Summer Series.

== 2024 season ==
=== Regular season ===
Date	Opponent	Home/Away	Location	Result	Ref.
28 June	Barbados	Home	Burnaby Lake Rugby Club	44–12	
28 June	Canada Select 'XV'	Home	Burnaby Lake Rugby Club	44–33	
20 July	Germany	Home	Burnaby Lake Rugby Club	30–26	
3 August	Brazil XV	Home	Burnaby Lake Rugby Club	77–7	
17 August	Canada XV	Home	Burnaby Lake Rugby Club	23–38	

== Current squad ==
Squad for 2024 Rugby Players’ Challenge Summer Series
=== Props === : (Canada) Cole Kelly; (Canada) Griffin Phillipson; (France) Theo Espagnol*; (Republic of Ireland) Conor O'Flaherty*; (Canada) Payton Teneycke; (Barbados) **Simeon John**; (Canada) Ed Wallin; (England) Finlay Kennedy*; === Hookers === : (Canada) Jacob Bossi; (England) Sam Mace; (England) Josh Olver; === Locks === : (Canada) **Donald Carson**; (Canada) Thomas Davidson; (Canada) Kaden Duguid; (Canada) Caden Wilson; (Canada) Asfand Saeed; **(Kenya) Brian Ndirangu**	=== Back-row === : (Canada) **Matt Klimchuk**; (Wales) Joe Locke; (Canada) **Ollie Nott**; (Georgia (country)) **Saba Shubitidze**; (Canada) Jake Thiel; (Canada) Relmu Wilson-Valdes; (Canada) Callum Brown; (Canada) Liam Kinghorn; (Republic of Ireland) Conall Henchy; === Scrum-halves === : (Canada) Jacob Bourne; (Canada) Keegan Neary; (Canada) **Reid Watkins**; === Fly-halves === : (England) James Biss*; (Australia) Mike Moloney*; (Canada) **Josh Thiel** (c)	=== Centres === : (Canada) **Giuseppe du Toit**; (Canada) Sion Griffiths; (Canada) **Talon McMullin**; (New Zealand) Hayden Mulgrew; (Samoa) Melani Nanai; === Outside Backs === : (Canada) Noah Bain; (Canada) Lenny Bondudau; (Canada) D'Shawn Bowen; (South Africa) Nico Leonard; (Canada) Alastair Marshall; (England) Nick Blain; (Canada) **Takoda McMullin**
Key: Senior 15s internationally capped players are listed in **bold**.; * denotes players qualified to play for Canada on dual nationality or residency grounds.

== Club staff ==
Rugby Department

Role	Name
Director of Sports Operations	(Canada) Randall Barton

First Team Coaching

Role	Name
Head Coach	(Canada) Tom Larisch
Assistant Coach	(Canada) Bill Chamberlain

== Notable players ==
=== Internationals ===
- (Barbados) Simeon John
- (Canada) Donald Carson
- (Canada) Matt Klimchuk
- (Canada) Ollie Nott
- (Canada) Reid Watkins
- (Canada) Josh Thiel
- (Canada) Giuseppe du Toit
- (Canada) Talon McMullin
- (Canada) Takoda McMullin
- (Georgia (country)) Saba Shubitidze
- (Kenya) Brian Ndirangu

== See also ==
- Rugby union in Canada
