= Don Carson (rugby union) =

Canada international rugby union player

- Height: 6 ft 6 in (198 cm)
- Weight: 250 lb (113 kg)
- School: Southpointe Academy
- University: University of British Columbia

Rugby union career
- Position: Flanker
Senior career
Years	Team	Apps	(Points)
2024-	Vancouver Highlanders	1	(0)
- Correct as of 9 August 2024
International career
Years	Team	Apps	(Points)
2021–	Canada	2	(0)
- Correct as of 9 August 2024

Don Carson is a Canadian international rugby union player.

A former UBC Thunderbirds player, Carson is one of a set of cousins to have played varsity rugby and was a 2019 Canadian University All-Star. He plays his rugby as a blindside flanker and lock. In 2021, Carson was capped twice for Canada, coming on off the bench against Wales at Millennium Stadium and England at Twickenham.

== See also ==
- List of Canada national rugby union players
