= Matt Klimchuk =

Canada international rugby union player

- Full name: Matthew Klimchuk
- Born: April 30, 2002 (age 24)
- Height: 6 ft 3 in (191 cm)
- School: Balfour Collegiate; St. Michaels University School
- University: University of Victoria

Rugby union career
- Position: Back row
- Current team: Vancouver Highlanders
Senior career
Years	Team	Apps	(Points)
2024-	Vancouver Highlanders	1	(0)
- Correct as of 9 August 2024
International career
Years	Team	Apps	(Points)
2022	Canada	1	(0)
- Correct as of 9 August 2024

Matthew Klimchuk (born April 30, 2002) is a Canadian international rugby union player.

Klimchuk was raised in Regina, Saskatchewan, where he attended Balfour Collegiate, before completing his secondary education at St. Michaels University School in Victoria, British Columbia.

A back row forward, Klimchuk made his international debut for Canada on the team's 2022 end of year European tour, coming on off the bench in the match against the Netherlands in Amsterdam.

== See also ==
- List of Canada national rugby union players
