= Giuseppe du Toit =

Canadian rugby union player

- Born: July 29, 1995 (age 31) Maple Ridge, British Columbia, Canada
- Height: 6 ft 0 in (1.83 m)
- Weight: 98 kg (216 lb; 15 st 6 lb)
- School: Shawnigan Lake School
- University: University of Victoria

Rugby union career
- Position: Centre
- Current team: Vancouver Highlanders
Senior career
Years	Team	Apps	(Points)
2019-2022	Toronto Arrows	34	(39)
2024	Miami Sharks	12	(5)
2024–	Vancouver Highlanders	1	(5)
- Correct as of 10 August 2024
Provincial / State sides
Years	Team	Apps	(Points)
2017-present	BC Bears		
International career
Years	Team	Apps	(Points)
2015	Canada u20s		
2016-	Canada A		
2017-Present	Canada	14	(5)
- Correct as of 10 October 2019

Giuseppe du Toit (born 29 July 1995) is a Canadian rugby union player who generally plays as a centre for the Toronto Arrows in Major League Rugby (MLR). He also represents Canada internationally.

On 27 September 2019, he was included in the Canadian squad for the 2019 Rugby World Cup as an injury replacement to Nick Blevins and also marked his first World Cup appearance.

== Career ==
He made his international debut for Canada against Chile on 11 February 2017. He received his maiden World Cup call for the 2019 World Cup while he was pursuing his studies at the University of Victoria and made his debut World Cup match appearance against South Africa on 5 October 2019.
