= Michael Stephenson (rugby union) =

England international rugby union player

- Born: Michael Stephenson; 28 September 1980 (age 46) Tynemouth, England
- Height: 6 ft 0 in (1.83 m)
- Weight: 13 st 0 lb (83 kg)
- School: Durham School

Rugby union career
- Position: Fullback
Senior career
Years	Team	Apps	(Points)
2000–05	Newcastle	163	(208)
2005–10	Bath	94	(165)
2010–12	Leeds Carnegie	48	(40)
2012-13	Percy Park RFC	22	(35)
International career
Years	Team	Apps	(Points)
2001	England	3	(0)

Michael Stephenson (born 28 September 1980 in Tynemouth) is a rugby union footballer, who plays at Touch My Pitch Up. He previously played at Fullback for Percy Park RFC and formerly for England. Stephenson began his career with the Newcastle Falcons, winning two English Cups in 2001 and 2004 during five years in the Falcons' first team before moving to Bath in the Summer of 2005, Stephenson then joined Leeds Carnegie before signing for Percy Park RFC and Percy Park Sharks. He currently plays for Touch My Pitch Up, sometimes. They have reached the play-off finals four years running and were unbeaten in the season leading up to the 2017 play-offs.

Stephenson's rugby career was nurtured at Durham School where he reached two National Cup semi-finals and played at first team level for three years in a team which has produced other internationals such as Garath Archer.

He made his international debut against Canada in Markham on 2 June 2001.
