= Kyle Baillie =

Canada international rugby union player

- Born: April 7, 1991 (age 35) St. Albert, Alberta, Canada
- Height: 1.97 m (6 ft 5 1/2 in)
- Weight: 112 kg (247 lb; 17 st 9 lb)
- School: Three Oaks High School

Rugby union career
- Position(s): Flanker, Lock
Amateur team(s)
Years	Team	Apps	(Points)
- Castaway Wanderers
–	Edmonton Druids		
–	St. Albert RFC		
–	Westshore RFC		
–	Halifax Tars		
Senior career
Years	Team	Apps	(Points)
2015	Eastern Suburbs	9	(10)
2016	Ohio Aviators	7	(10)
2017–2018	London Scottish	15	(5)
2017	Saracens (trial)	1	(0)
2019–2021	New Orleans Gold	8	(5)
2022	Toronto Arrows	15	(5)
2023–	Old Glory DC	10	(10)
2024-	New England Free Jacks	25	((5))
Provincial / State sides
Years	Team	Apps	(Points)
2012–2015	The Rock		
2016–	Prairie Wolf Pack		
International career
Years	Team	Apps	(Points)
2014	Canada A		
2016–	Canada	28	(15)

Kyle Baillie (born April 7, 1991) is a Canadian rugby union player. He plays as a flanker or lock for the Canadian national team and New England free jacks in Major League Rugby (MLR).

He previously played for NOLA Gold and the Toronto Arrows in the MLR.

== Professional career ==
Baillie previously played for the Ohio Aviators in the now defunct PRO Rugby.

He also played for the London Scottish in the Greene King IPA Championship and had a trial at Saracens on loan from London Scottish.

In 2019, Baillie signed with the NOLA Gold of Major League Rugby. He was made the team's captain for the 2021 season.

He would then play one season for the Toronto Arrows in 2022 making 15 appearances. Then moving on to Old Glory DC in 2023 scoring 2 tries in 10 appearances.

He would sign with the free jacks in 2024. In his first year with the club he would help them win a championship as well as being named to the MLR all second team. He would return to the Free Jacks the following year, winning another championship.

== International career ==
Baillie made his debut for the Canadian National team in 2016. He also participated in the 2019 rugby World Cup.

== Honours ==
New England Free Jacks

- Major League Rugby Championship: 2x (2024, 2025)
- All Major League Rugby second team (2024)
