= Duane Major =

Canada international rugby union player

- Full name: Duane Andrew Major
- Born: 15 February 1972 (age 54) Christchurch, New Zealand
- Height: 6 ft 0 in (183 cm)
- Weight: 235 lb (107 kg)

Rugby union career
- Position: Prop
International career
Years	Team	Apps	(Points)
1999–2001	Canada	11	(0)

Duane Andrew Major (born 15 February 1972) is a New Zealand-born Canadian former rugby union international.

Major, born in Christchurch, competed locally for Burnside and played some provincial rugby with Canterbury.

A Canadian passport holder through his Saskatchewan-born mother, Major approached Canada for a possible opportunity and was invited to a training camp on Vancouver Island. He secured a place on the 1999 tour of Great Britain and made his debut against England at Twickenham. His next assignment was the 1999 Rugby World Cup, where he came off the bench in matches against Fiji and Namibia. He remained with the team until 2001, earning 11 Test caps.

== See also ==
- List of Canada national rugby union players
