= Brian McCarthy (rugby union) =

Canada international rugby union player

- Full name: Brian William McCarthy
- Born: September 15, 1969 (age 57) Brockville, Ontario, Canada
- Height: 6 ft 4 in (193 cm)
- Weight: 255 lb (116 kg)

Rugby union career
- Position: Lock
International career
Years	Team	Apps	(Points)
1996–98	Canada	5	(0)

Brian William McCarthy (born September 15, 1969) is a Canadian former international rugby union player.

A 6 ft 4 in lock from Brockville, Ontario, McCarthy competed with the Canada national team from 1996 to 1998, gaining a total of five caps. He was an unused squad member at the 1999 Rugby World Cup.

McCarthy played professional rugby in England with Nottingham in 1997, then had a season with Fylde.

== See also ==
- List of Canada national rugby union players
