= Ed Knaggs =

Canada international rugby union player

- Born: July 20, 1973 (age 53)
- Height: 6 ft 5 in (196 cm)
- Weight: 250 lb (113 kg)

Rugby union career
- Position: Lock
International career
Years	Team	Apps	(Points)
2000–03	Canada	19	(0)

Ed Knaggs (born July 20, 1973) is a Trinidad-born Canadian former international rugby union player.

== Rugby career ==
Raised in Nova Scotia, Knaggs was a 6 ft 5 in lock and played his club rugby for Castaway Wanderers.

Knaggs toured England with a West Indies representative team in 2000. He was a member of the Canada national team between 2000 and 2003, gaining 19 total caps. His final appearances for Canada came against the All Blacks at the 2003 Rugby World Cup.

== See also ==
- List of Canada national rugby union players
