= Reynolds Secondary School =

École Secondaire Reynolds Secondary School
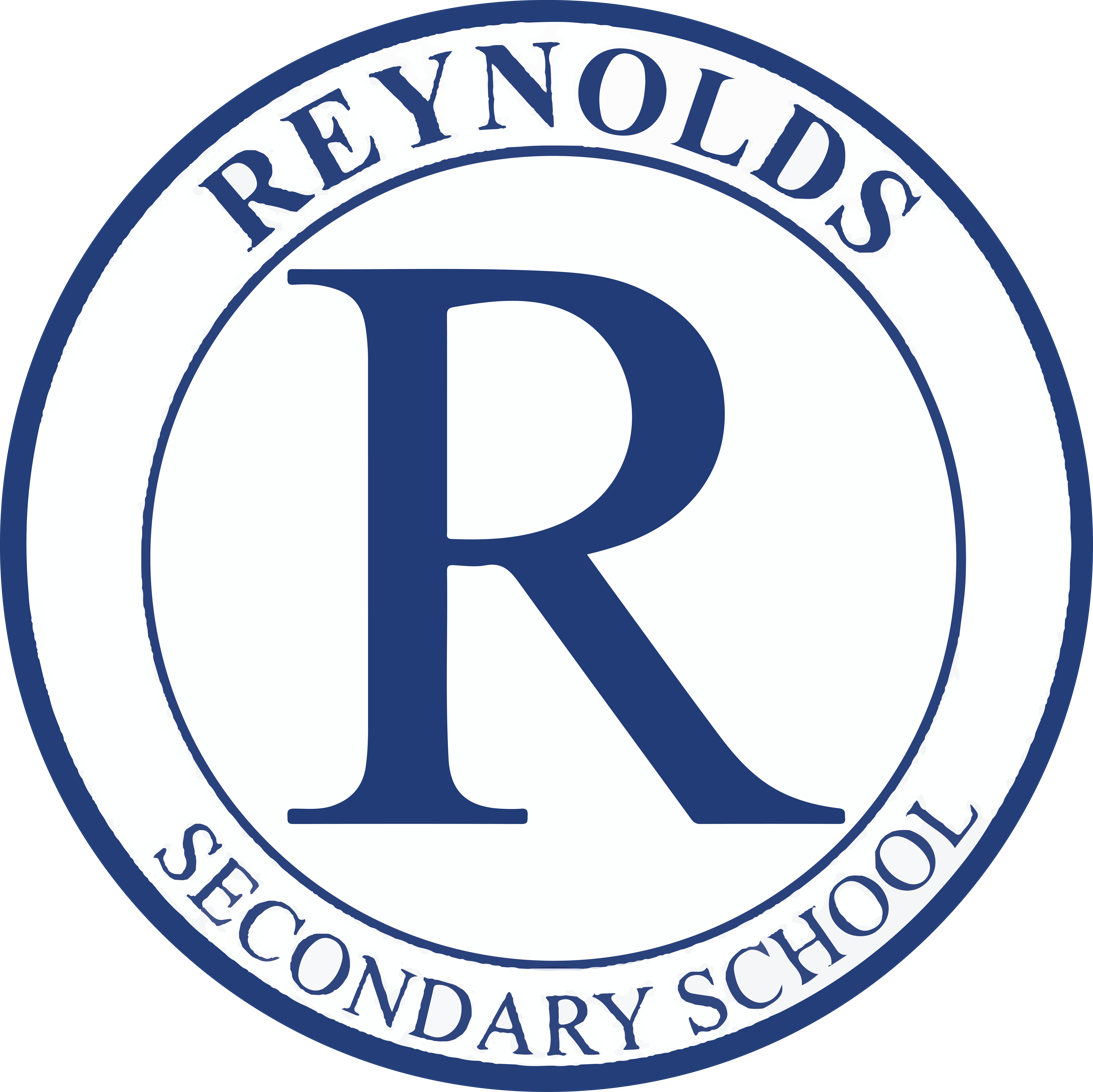

Location
- 4200 Borden Street; Saanich, British Columbia, V8P 3H9; Canada; 48.4687°N 123.3597°W

Information
- School type: Public, high school
- School board: School District 61 Greater Victoria
- Principal: Bruce Bidney
- Grades: 9-12
- Enrollment: 967 (2024–2025)
- Language: English, French
Colour
- Mascot: The Roadrunner
- Team name: Roadrunners
- Website: www.reynolds.sd61.bc.ca

École Secondaire Reynolds Secondary School is a public secondary school in the Greater Victoria suburb of Saanich, British Columbia, Canada. The school is known for its numerous specialized programs, including flexible studies, French immersion, robotics club, band, and its Centre for Soccer Excellence program. Reynolds also offers many career planning programs such as CP Theatre, CP Art, CP Recreation, CP Tourism, CP Journalism and co-op.

Reynolds Secondary School in 2005

Reynolds is an active supporter of the Cops for Cancer fundraiser for the Canadian Cancer Society. The school holds various fundraisers such as car washes, head shaves, and bake sales to raise money for the cause. In 2010, students and staff raised over $52,000, $80,000 in 2011, and over $100,000 in 2012, and in 2022, they had reached the $1,000,000 mark in total money raised.

== Programs ==
- French immersion
- Centre for Soccer Excellence
- Flexible studies
- Robotics team competing in the FIRST Robotics Competition
- Band/Drumline
- Musical theatre
- Outdoor Education

== Robotics team ==
The Reynolds ReyBots (team number 7787) competed for the first time in the 2019 FIRST Robotics Competition season. They are recipients of the Rookie All-Star Award, awarded for excellent team management, business plan, and exemplifying the mission of FIRST. The award included an invite to the FIRST Championship in Houston, Texas, which they attended in March 2019.

The team expanded by founding two FIRST Tech Challenge teams (team numbers 16353 and 18840). In the 2023 FIRST Tech Challenge season, the ReyBots qualified once more for the FIRST Championship in Houston, Texas, after winning the FTC British Columbia Championship in Surrey, B.C.

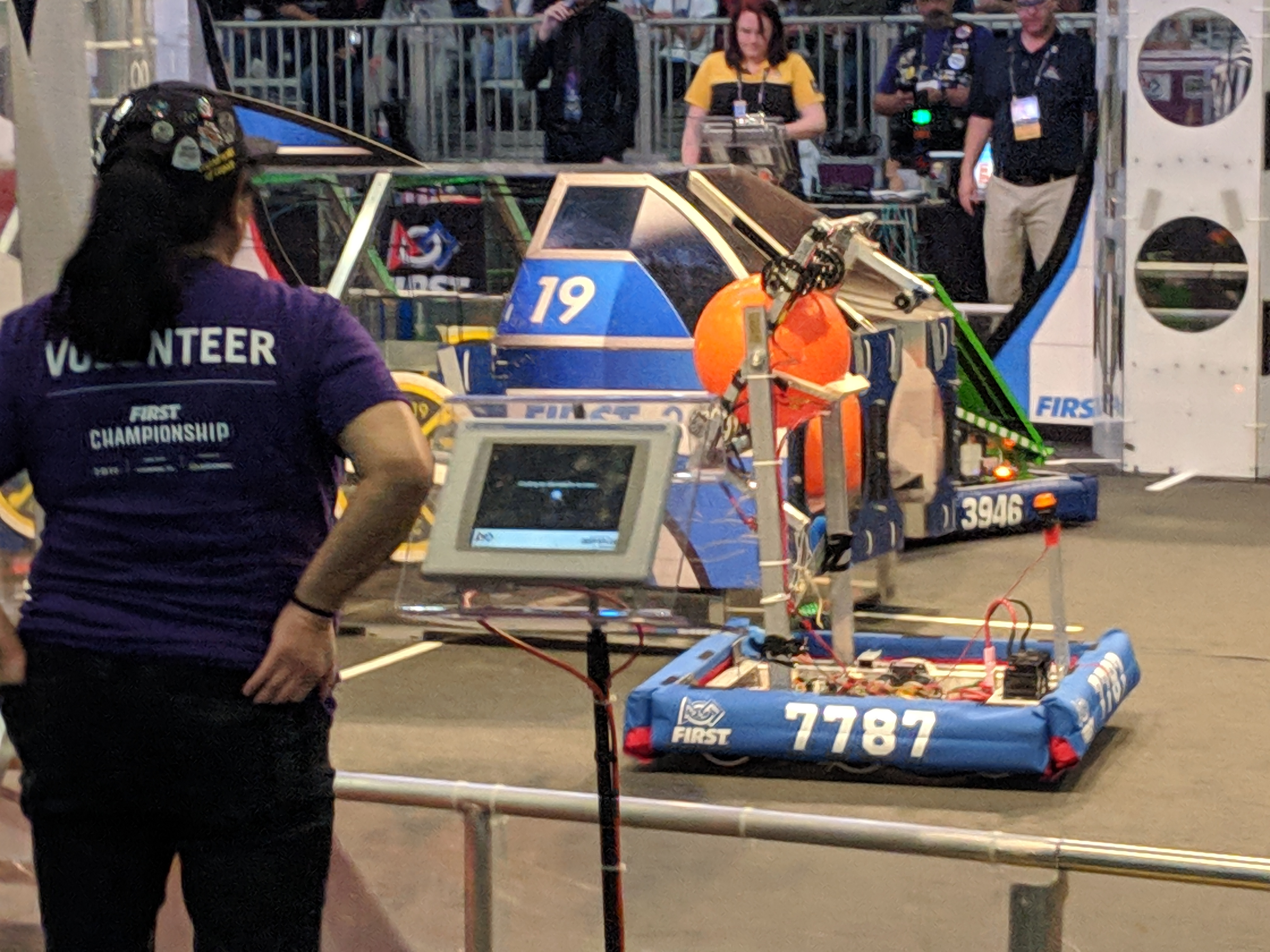
The Reynolds ReyBots robot mid-match at the FRC 2019 World Championship in Houston, TX

== Musical theatre ==
The musical theatre has a new performance prepared every year:

- Newsies (2026)
- Mamma Mia! (2025)
- Mean Girls (2024)
- The Wedding Singer (2023)
- Legally Blonde (2022)
- Freaky Friday (2021)
- Nice Work If You Can Get It (2020)
- Sister Act (2019)
- Spamalot (2018)
- Guys and Dolls (2017)
- Grease (2016)
- Seussical (2015)
- Curtains (2014)
- How to Succeed in Business Without Really Trying (2013)
- Bye Bye Birdie (2012)
- The Music Man (2011)

== Athletics ==
Athletics Reynolds Secondary School's cross country and track & field teams, known as the Roadrunners, compete in the Greater Victoria zone of BC School Sports.

=== 2025–2026 Season ===
The 2025–2026 season was highly successful for the Reynolds Roadrunners athletics program. In cross country, Tristan Hill won the provincial championship in the junior boys category. On the track, Hill also claimed the provincial title in the junior boys 800m. Clara Simpson won the provincial championship in the junior girls cross country event. The team excelled in track & field, winning the AAA team titles in Senior Boys and Junior Boys. Henry Trumpy became provincial champion in the 1500m steeplechase.

== Notable alumni ==
- John Horgan, politician and former premier of British Columbia
