= Paul Szabo (rugby union) =

Canada international rugby union player

- Born: September 12, 1962 (age 64) New Westminster, BC, Canada

Rugby union career
- Position: Prop
International career
Years	Team	Apps	(Points)
1989–93	Canada	9	(0)

Paul Szabo (born September 12, 1962) is a Canadian former international rugby union player.

Born in New Westminster, British Columbia, Szabo was a Brit Lions prop, capped nine times for Canada between 1989 and 1993. He scored two tries in a match against Wales "B" in Edmonton in 1989 and later that year made his first capped appearance, against an Ireland XV. In 1991, Szabo made Canada's Rugby World Cup squad and spent the pool stages as a reserve, before replacing an injured Dan Jackart for the quarter-final against the All Blacks.

== See also ==
- List of Canada national rugby union players
