= Martyn Wood =

England international rugby union player

- Born: Martyn Benjamin Wood; 25 April 1977 (age 49) Harrogate, England
- Height: 1.78 m (5 ft 10 in)
- Weight: 207 lb (14 st 11 lb)

Rugby union career
- Position: Scrum-half
- Current team: Retired
Senior career
Years	Team	Apps	(Points)
1996–2003	Wasps	84	(50)
2003-2005	Bath	44	(5)
International career
Years	Team	Apps	(Points)
2001	England	2	(5)
Coaching career
- Years: Team
- 2019: Yorkshire Carnegie

Martyn Benjamin Wood (born 25 April 1977 in Harrogate) was the Director of Rugby at Yorkshire Carnegie in the RFU Championship, he was previously a rugby union scrum-half who played for Wasps and Bath. In 2001 he gained 2 caps for England.

== Early career ==
Wood attended Harrogate Grammar School from 1988 to 1995 where he played in the School Rugby team. Wood would become a successful part of the Senior 1st XV. He also played for Harrogate

== Club career ==
Wood began his career at Wasps, making his debut in 1996 and remained there until 2003. Whilst at Wasps he won the Challenge Cup in 2003 (scoring a try in the final) and the domestic Anglo-Welsh Cup (currently known as the LV Cup) in 1999 and 2000 (though he was not part of the squad for the 1999 final). He was also part of the Wasps team which won the Premiership in 1996/97 and 2002/03, In the summer of 2003 he joined Bath and signed a new contract with them in 2005. However, in November 2005 he injured his neck in a freak trampolining accident, leading to him having to retire from the game exactly a year later.

== International career ==
Wood was called up as an injury replacement for the 1999 Rugby World Cup and also as injury cover for the victorious 2003 Rugby World Cup. However he was never officially added to the 2003 squad after certain players recovered, meaning he was unable to pick up a medal for the 2003 success despite flying out to Australia.

Despite his World Cup involvement, he only received two caps, both as a replacement in games against Canada and USA in 2001, scoring a try against Canada in the process.

== Coaching career ==
On 24 July 2019 Wood was appointed as Director of Rugby at Yorkshire Carnegie in the RFU Championship, he was dismissed from the post less than a year later after losing the first 13 matches of the 2019–20 Season.

== Honours ==
- English Champions titles: 2
  - 1996/97, 2002/03
- RFU Tetley's Bitter Cup & Powergen Cup / Powergen Anglo Welsh Cup titles: 2
  - 1998/99, 1999/2000
- Parker Pen Challenge Cup titles: 1
  - 2002/03
