= Harry Toews =

Canada international rugby union player

- Born: August 7, 1971 (age 55) Alberta, Canada
- Height: 6 ft 0 in (183 cm)
- Weight: 229 lb (104 kg)
- School: Abbotsford Senior Secondary
- University: University of British Columbia

Rugby union career
- Position: Prop / Hooker
Senior career
| Years | Team | Apps | (Points) |
| 1998–99 | Leicester Tigers | 7 | (0) |
| 1999–03 | Rotherham Titans | | |
| 2004–10 | Sheffield Tigers | | |
International career
| Years | Team | Apps | (Points) |
| 1998–01 | Canada | 11 | (5) |

Harry Toews (born August 7, 1971) is a Canadian former international rugby union player.

Toews attended Abbotsford Senior Secondary School, where he picked up the sport at age 16.

A youth product of Abbotsford RFC, Toews was a forward and played varsity rugby with the UBC Thunderbirds, then had several seasons in English professional rugby. He competed for Leicester Tigers in the 1998–99 Premiership Rugby season, then won two Division One titles playing with Rotherham Titans, before joining Sheffield for six seasons.

Toews was capped 11 times for Canada as a hooker and prop from 1998 to 2001.

In 2015, Toews was inducted into the Abbotsford Sports Hall of Fame.

== See also ==
- List of Canada national rugby union players
