= Dan Vlad =

- Born: July 12, 1983 (age 43)
- Height: 1.85 m (6 ft 1 in)
- Weight: 103 kg (227 lb; 16.2 st)

Rugby union career
- Position: Wing
International career
Years	Team	Apps	(Points)
2005–2008	Romania	11	(4)

Dan Vlad (born Bucharest, 12 July 1983) is a Romanian rugby union footballer. He plays as a wing.

Vlad current team is Steaua București Rugby. He has 11 caps for Romania, since his debut in 2005 to 2008, with 2 conversions, 4 points in aggregate. He played a single match at the 2007 Rugby World Cup, in the narrow loss to Italy (18–24), which gave Romania a bonus point.
