= Melani Nanai =

Samoan rugby union player

- Full name: Melani Nanai Vai
- Born: 3 August 1993 (age 33) Apia, Samoa
- Height: 1.94 m (6 ft 4 1/2 in)
- Weight: 102 kg (16 st 1 lb; 225 lb)
- School: De La Salle College

Rugby union career
- Position: Wing, Fullback
- Current team: Vancouver Highlanders
Senior career
Years	Team	Apps	(Points)
2014–2019	Auckland	35	(60)
2015−2019	Blues	64	(80)
2019-2022	Worcester Warriors	26	(20)
2023	Crusaders	1	(0)
2024-	Vancouver Highlanders	4	(0)
- Correct as of 28 October 2024
International career
Years	Team	Apps	(Points)
2013	Samoa Under-20	5	(15)
2016	Barbarians	2	(5)
2024	Samoa	2	
- Correct as of 28 October 2024

Melani Nanai (born 3 August 1993) is a Samoan rugby union player who plays as an outside back for the Vancouver Highlanders.

== Early career ==
Born and raised in Samoa, Nanai came to New Zealand to attend high school at De La Salle College in the southern part of Auckland. He later returned home to his native Samoa at the end of his 5th form in 2009 before returning to New Zealand in 2011. He worked packing boxes and doing dispatch in East Tāmaki while playing club rugby, first for Otahuhu and latterly for Manukau Rovers where he came under the wing of All Black legend, Frank Bunce.

His brother's, Kitiona and Codemeru Vai, are currently contracted to the All Blacks 7's squad. His father Kitiona Nanai Vai was a Samoan Rugby international, whilst his sister Corina Nanai Vai and his wife, Bridie Nanai also represented Auckland Storm in the Farah Palmer Cup.

== Senior career ==
Although not initially named in the Auckland squad for the 2014 ITM Cup, Nanai's impressive form at club level for Manukau Rovers saw him break into their top team and make 5 appearances during the campaign which ended with him being named development player of the year. A first team squad member in 2015, Nanai scored 3 tries in 6 games as Auckland finished as Premiership runner-up, going down narrowly to Canterbury in the final and this time he was named as Auckland's rookie of the year. 2016 was not such a good year for Auckland, as they finished 5th on the log, while Nanai's try scoring and appearance stats were the same as the previous year, 3 tries in 6 matches.

In addition to playing for Auckland at provincial level, he has also represented them in sevens rugby as well as winning the World 10s Championship with the Blues.

He joined Premiership Rugby side Worcester Warriors ahead of the 2019–20 season. He remained at the club until the end of the 2022 season before returning to New Zealand.

In July 2022, Melani signed to play in the NPC for Bay Of Plenty alongside brothers Kitiona and Codemeru Vai for the 2022 and 2023 seasons. He went on to play for the Crusaders Super Rugby side in 2023 under the guidance of Scott Robertson. Following this, he was scheduled to play for Rugby New York in the MLR for 2024, but after the club filed closure in December 2023, Nanai signed to play for the newly formed Vancouver Highlanders in the Rugby Players Challenge Summer Series.

== Super Rugby ==
Just 5 appearances at provincial level were enough to convince Auckland-based Super Rugby franchise the Blues to name him in their wider training group for the 2015 Super Rugby season. He enjoyed a hugely impressive debut campaign playing at Super Rugby level, making 13 starts in the outside back positions and scoring 3 tries. Tana Umaga replaced Sir John Kirwan as Blues head coach ahead of the 2016 Super Rugby season and he promoted Nanai to their first team squad. Again he was a regular through 2016, mostly in the fullback position vacated by Charles Piutau and this time he scored 5 times in 11 appearances.

Melani continued to play for the Blues until 2019, gaining 64 appearances for the franchise and in the same year winning the award for Blues’ Players Player of the Year.

In 2023 he returned to Super Rugby in a move to the Crusaders on a one-year deal.

== International ==
Nanai was a member of the Samoa Under-20 team which competed in the 2013 IRB Junior World Championship in France where he scored 3 tries in 5 appearances.

He also played in the number 15 jersey for the Barbarians in their 31–31 draw against South Africa at Wembley Stadium on 5 November 2016. He scored the game's opening try in the 4th minute.

On 14th September 2024, Nanai made his debut for the Samoan Men's International side during the Pacific Nation's Cup in Tokyo against the Brave Blossoms side debuting from the bench in the midfield. Manu Samoa lost the game 49-27.

== Super Rugby statistics ==
As of 23 November 2016

Season	Team	Games	Starts	Sub	Mins	Tries	Cons	Pens	Drops	Points	Yel	Red
2015	Blues	13	13	0	1003	3	0	0	0	15	0	0
2016	Blues	11	10	1	821	5	0	0	0	25	0	0
Total		24	23	1	1824	8	0	0	0	40	0	0
