= Matt Phinney =

Canada international rugby union player

- Full name: Matthew Phinney
- Born: December 15, 1980 (age 45)
- Height: 6 ft 4 in (193 cm)
- Weight: 235 lb (107 kg)

Rugby union career
- Position: Lock
International career
Years	Team	Apps	(Points)
2006	Canada	2	(0)

Matthew Phinney (born December 15, 1980) is a Canadian former international rugby union player.

A lock from Markham, Ontario, Phinney played for Markham RFC, Toronto Xtreme and Meraloma. He is Jewish and represented Canada at the 2005 Maccabiah Games in Israel. During the 2006 Churchill Cup, Phinney was capped twice by the Canada national team, for matches against Scotland A and England Saxons.

Phinney is a now a chiropractor in Michigan.

== See also ==
- List of Canada national rugby union players
