= Brian McCarthy (footballer) =

Australian rules footballer

Personal information
- Full name: Brian McCarthy
- Born: 20 January 1936
- Original team: Yarrawonga
- Height: 179 cm (5 ft 10 in)
- Weight: 77 kg (170 lb)
- Position: Half forward

Playing career^{1}
Years	Club	Games (Goals)
1956–61	St Kilda	74 (13)
- ^{1} Playing statistics correct to the end of 1961.

Brian McCarthy (born 20 January 1936) is a former Australian rules footballer who played with St Kilda in the Victorian Football League (VFL).
