= Ollie Nott =

Canada international rugby union player

- Born: Oliver John Nott; 26 May 1995 (age 31) Leicester, United Kingdom
- Height: 1.89 m (6 ft 2 1/2 in)
- Weight: 102 kg (16.1 st; 225 lb)
- School: Shawnigan Lake School
- University: University of Victoria

Rugby union career
- Position: Flanker
- Current team: Vancouver Highlanders
Senior career
Years	Team	Apps	(Points)
2020–2022	Toronto Arrows	5	(0)
2024-	Vancouver Highlanders	3	(0)
- Correct as of 9 August 2024
International career
Years	Team	Apps	(Points)
2015	Canada U20s	9	(5)
2017	Canada	2	(0)
- Correct as of 9 August 2024

Ollie Nott (born 26 May 1995) is a Canadian rugby union player, currently playing for the Vancouver Highlanders and the Canadian national team. His preferred position is flanker.

== Professional career ==
Nott signed for Major League Rugby side Toronto Arrows in June 2021 during the 2021 Major League Rugby season. Nott made his debut for Canada in the 2017 Americas Rugby Championship.
