= Jason Penaluna =

Canada international rugby union player

- Born: October 11, 1973 (age 53) Winnipeg, Canada
- Height: 5 ft 10 in (178 cm)
- Weight: 175 lb (79 kg)
- School: St. Michaels University School
- University: University of Victoria

Rugby union career
- Position: Fly-half / Fullback
Senior career
Years	Team	Apps	(Points)
1996–97	Nottingham		
1997–98	Blackheath		
1998–99	Bristol		
International career
Years	Team	Apps	(Points)
1996	Canada	1	(5)

Jason Penaluna (born October 11, 1973) is a Canadian former international rugby union player.

== Biography ==
Born in Winnipeg, Penaluna was educated at St. Michaels University School and the University of Victoria.

=== Rugby career ===
Penaluna, primarily a fly-half, attained his solitary Canada cap off the bench in a Test match against Uruguay in the 1996 edition of the PARA Pan American Championship, scoring a try in a 24–18 win. He held a British passport by virtue of his Cornish father and joined Nottingham in the 1996/97 season. Signed by Blackheath the following season, Penaluna's campaign ended early when he tore an ACL and after recovering moved on to Bristol.

== See also ==
- List of Canada national rugby union players
