= John Tait (rugby union) =

Canada international rugby union player

- Born: August 14, 1973 (age 53) Orangeville, Ontario, Canada
- Height: 6 ft 8 in (2.03 m)
- Weight: 242 lb (110 kg; 17 st 4 lb)

Rugby union career
- Position: Lock
Senior career
Years	Team	Apps	(Points)
1997-2003	Cardiff Blues	140	(30)
2003-2005	CA Brive	4	(5)
International career
Years	Team	Apps	(Points)
1997–2002	Canada	37	(5)
Coaching career
- Years: Team
- -present: Canada 7s
Medal record
Pan American Games
Gold medal – first place	2015 Toronto	Team competition
World Cup 7s
Silver medal – second place	2013 Russia	Team competition

John Noel Tait (born August 14, 1973) is a Canadian former rugby union player.

He played 37 games for Canada. His brother is Luke Tait, who also plays on the Canadian national rugby team.

He was the head coach of the Canadian National Senior Women sevens team, and coached the 2016 Canadian Women's 7 team for the 2016 Summer Olympics in Rio. He led the team to compete in the 2018 Commonwealth Games on the Gold Coast of Australia.

He is currently the Technical director for British Columbia Rugby.
