= Jamie Cudmore =

Canada international rugby union player

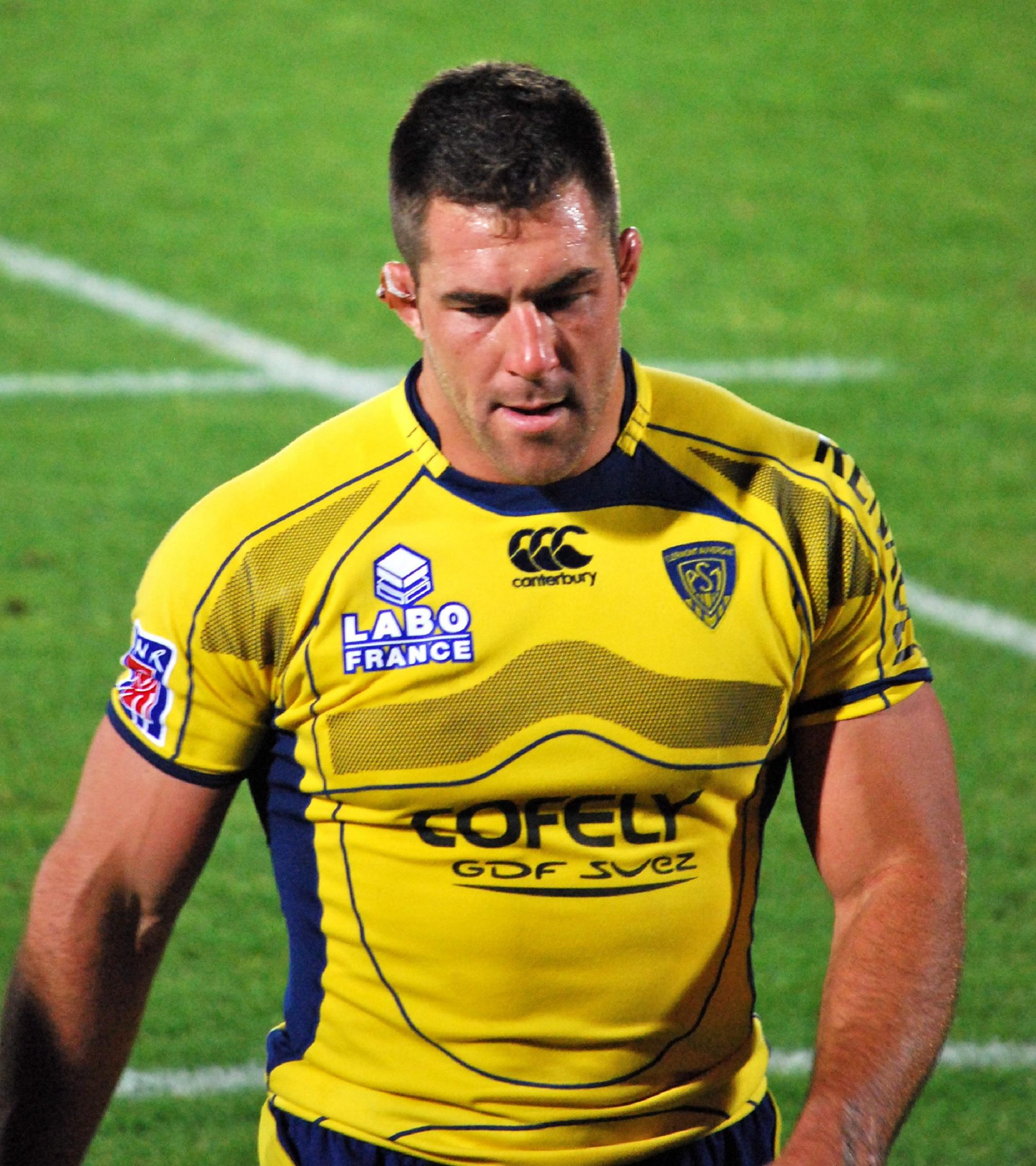
- Cudmore in 2009
- Born: Jamie Cudmore; 6 September 1978 (age 48) Winnipeg, Manitoba, Canada
- Height: 196 cm (6 ft 5 in)
- Weight: 118 kg (18 st 8 lb; 260 lb)

Rugby union career
- Position(s): Lock, Flanker
Amateur team(s)
Years	Team	Apps	(Points)
- Capilano
Senior career
Years	Team	Apps	(Points)
2002–2003	Llanelli	13	(5)
2002–2003	Llandovery	23	(25)
2004–2005	Grenoble	28	(5)
2005–2016	Clermont	212	(90)
2016–2017	Oyonnax	15	(5)
International career
Years	Team	Apps	(Points)
2002–2016	Canada	43	(15)

Jamie Cudmore (born 6 September 1978) is a Canadian former professional rugby union player who played as a lock and as a flanker. Born in Winnipeg, Manitoba, he began his career with Capilano RFC in British Columbia. He then played professionally in Wales for Llanelli and Llandovery, and in France for Grenoble, Clermont and Oyonnax. He was nicknamed "Cuddles" by his teammates.

== Professional career ==
Cudmore debuted for Canada in 2002 against the United States and appeared in the 2003, 2007, 2011 and 2015 Rugby World Cups.

On 29 May 2010, Cudmore's team ASM Clermont Auvergne won the Top 14 Championship, beating USA Perpignan 19–6 at the Stade de France. The win marked the first French national title in the club's history.

Cudmore retired at the end of the 2016–17 season.

Following critical posts on social media towards Canada's women's 7s rugby team, Cudmore was relieved from his coaching position with Rugby Canada.

== Personal life ==
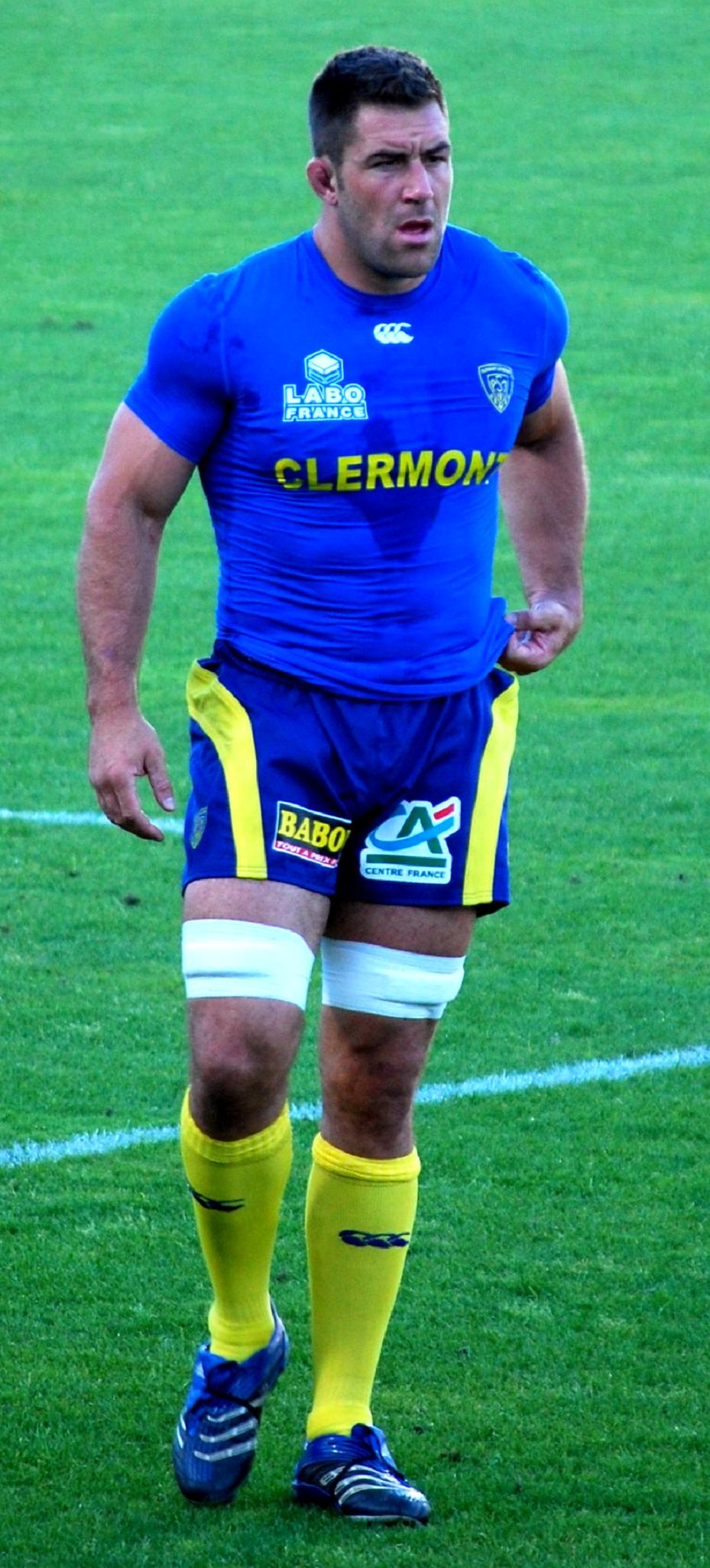
Cudmore in 2009

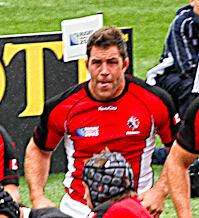
Cudmore in 2011

Cudmore says he "had a bit of trouble growing up". As a teenager, he was an enforcer for a drug dealer in his hometown and spent a year in a youth detention center following a conviction for assault. He has stated that rugby turned his life around and channelled his aggression in the proud spirit of rugby union, throughout his playing career.

Cudmore's younger brother is actor Daniel Cudmore, who starred as the mutant Colossus in the X-Men films. His other younger brother, Luke Cudmore, has represented the Canada U21 rugby team.

Cudmore and his wife Jennifer, who is originally from Newfoundland, have a daughter, Maelle. They currently live in the Clermont-Ferrand area of France, where Jamie owns a wine bar called "Vinomania", and a sportsbar/nightclub called "The Five". Jennifer is an entrepreneur with an honors MBA from Grenoble École de Management, and together they recently came out with their own wine label called "Sin Bin". With the Chardonnay being named 'Yellow Card', and 'Red Card' being the name of the Pinot Noir Gamay, they poke fun at his disciplinary record.
