= Dan Baugh =

Canada international rugby union player

- Born: September 10, 1974 (age 52) Regina, Saskatchewan, Canada
- Height: 6 ft 0 in (1.83 m)
- Weight: 220 lb (100 kg; 15 st 10 lb)

Rugby union career
- Position: Loose forward
International career
Years	Team	Apps	(Points)
1998-2002	Canada	27	(25)

Dan Baugh (born September 10, 1974 in Regina, Saskatchewan) is a Canadian rugby union player, who retired in 2005 due to a long string of injuries. He ended his career in Wales with the Cardiff Blues of the Celtic League.

A popular player at the Cardiff Arms Park, he joined the club in 1998 after back row forward Gwyn Jones broke his neck. The Canadian international, renowned for his direct running and bruising tackles, enjoyed a successful period at the club. His approach has however not come without his share of injuries to his knees in particular, but it was a break to his foot which caused him to retire.

After retirement, he remained with Cardiff Blues as a conditioning coach. During the 2007–8 season he became forwards coach. In 2011 he left Cardiff Blues to take up a permanent role with Wales. In 2014 it was announced he would join Wasps RFC as the strength and conditioning coach.

He played 27 times for the Canadian national team.

In November 2023, Baugh, then Head of Performance for Dragons RFC, received a four-game suspension from the Welsh Rugby Union for breaching disciplinary regulations during a match.

In July 2024 Baugh was appointed Strength and Conditioning Coach of the Georgia national side.
