= Ryan McWhinney =

Canada rugby union player (born 1978)

- Born: January 28, 1978 (age 48) Abbotsford, BC, Canada
- Height: 6 ft 0 in (183 cm)
- Weight: 215 lb (98 kg)

Rugby union career
- Position: Centre
International career
| Years | Team | Apps | (Points) |
| 2005 | Canada | 2 | (0) |

Ryan McWhinney (born January 28, 1978) is a Canadian former international rugby union player.

An Abbotsford native, McWhinney is a product of Abbotsford Secondary School and in addition to rugby was a Canadian football safety at the University of British Columbia, earning a Peter Gorman Trophy nomination in 1995.

McWhinney toured Europe with the Canada national rugby union team in 2005, gaining two caps. He debuted off the bench against France in Nantes and was the starting inside centre against Romania in Bucharest.

A PE teacher by profession, McWhinney is serving as athletic director for Abbotsford Senior Secondary School.

== See also ==
- List of Canada national rugby union players
