= Matt Weingart =

Canada international rugby union player

- Born: 26 June 1982 (age 44) Williams Lake, British Columbia, Canada
- Height: 179 cm (5 ft 10 in)
- Weight: 81 kg (179 lb; 12 st 11 lb)

Rugby union career
- Position: Scrum-half
International career
Years	Team	Apps	(Points)
2004–2007	Canada	7	(0)
- Correct as of 5 May 2021

Matt Weingart (born 26 June 1982 in Canada) was a Canadian rugby union player. His playing position was scrum-half. He was named in the Canada squad for the 2007 Rugby World Cup, although he did not make any appearances in the tournament. He did, however, make 7 international appearances for Canada between 2004 and 2007, before starting the sports clothing brand Dryworld.
