= Brodie Henderson (rugby union) =

Canada international rugby union player

- Born: Brodie Henderson; December 12, 1983 (age 42) Vancouver, British Columbia, Canada
- Height: 6 ft 1 in (185 cm)
- Weight: 217 lb (98 kg)

Rugby union career
- Position(s): Wing & Fullback
- Current team: Abbotsford RFC
Senior career
Years	Team	Apps	(Points)
- Chilliwack Blues
–	Abbotsford RFC		
–	Bay of Plenty		
–	Birmingham and Solihull R.F.C.		
–	Bayside Sharks		
–	Abbotsford RFC		
International career
Years	Team	Apps	(Points)
2005-	Canada	3	(10)
–	Canada Sevens		

Brodie Henderson (born December 12, 1983) is a rugby union player who has represented Canada and Canada Sevens. Henderson played professionally for Bay of Plenty in New Zealand during the 2005-2006 season and Pertemps Bees in the English National Division 1 (now known as the RFU Championship) in the 2006-2007 season.

Born in Vancouver, British Columbia, Henderson represented Canada U21 and U23 at soccer and additionally played junior professional ice hockey, before embarking on a career in rugby.

== Club career ==
Henderson started his rugby career playing for his local team in Chilliwack before moving to senior rugby in Abbotsford in the Fraser Valley within just a few months of him starting the game. From there he was called up to the Canada Sevens squad, playing in the Rugby Sevens World Cup in Hong Kong and left Abbotsford for Bay of Plenty in New Zealand.

Henderson was signed by English side Pertemps Bees for the 2006-2007 season and made his debut as a substitute versus Sedgley Park. Henderson left Pertemps Bees before the end of the campaign for personal reasons and did not return to England to continue his playing career.

Henderson currently plays for Abbotsford RFC in his native Canada.

== International career ==
Henderson currently has 3 full caps for Canada and has scored 2 tries, including one on his debut versus Japan. All three of Henderson's full international caps to date came during 2005. Henderson toured New Zealand in 2006 with a touring Canada "A" side. He also is an experienced rugby sevens international having toured the IRB Sevens world circuit with the Canadian national team for several seasons at the start of his career.

Henderson returned to the international sevens setup for the first time since 2007 in December 2009 playing for a Maple Leaf Development VII in the Punta DEl Estes 7s in Uruguay. This was followed by a return to the senior squad for the 2010 USA Sevens.

== Sources ==
- http://www.bayofplentytimes.co.nz/storyprint.cfm?storyID=3631721
- http://www.rugbycanada.ca/index.php?lang=en&page_id=112
- http://www.beesrugby.com
