= Canada at the Rugby World Cup =

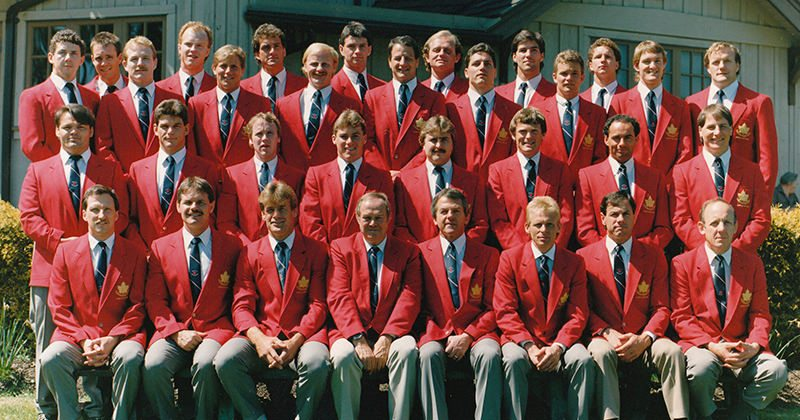
Canada National Rugby Squad, 1987 World Cup

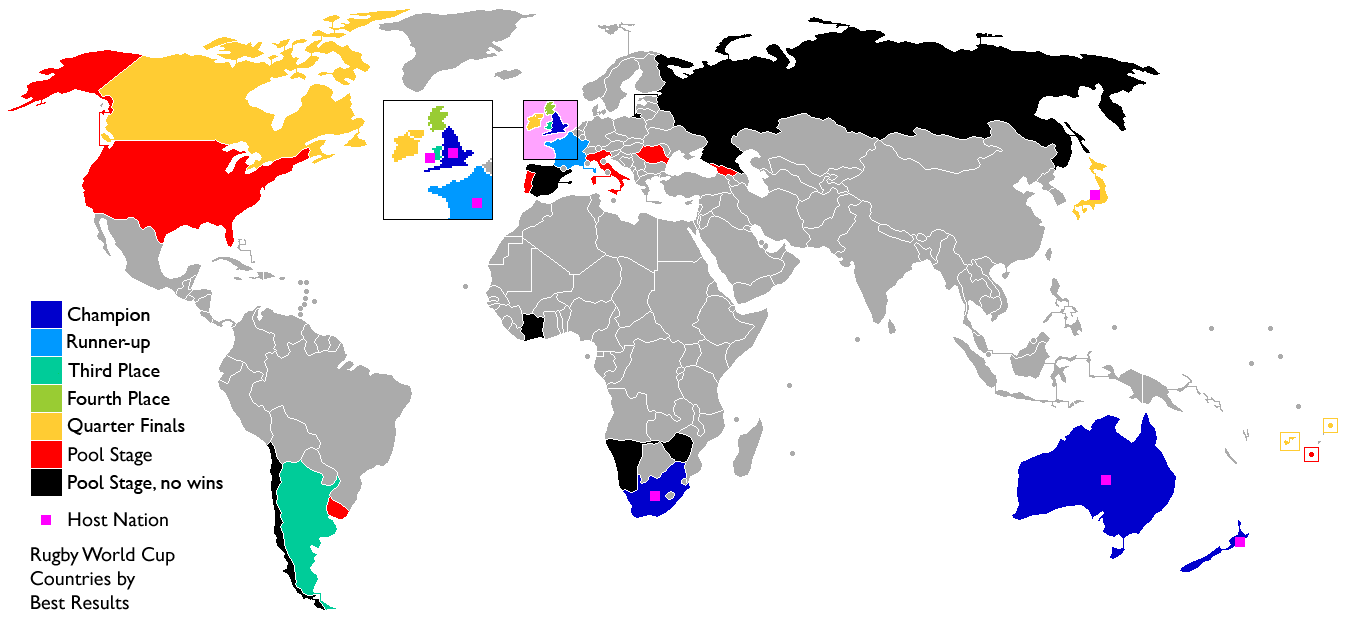
Map of nations best results, excluding nations which unsuccessfully participated in qualifying tournaments.

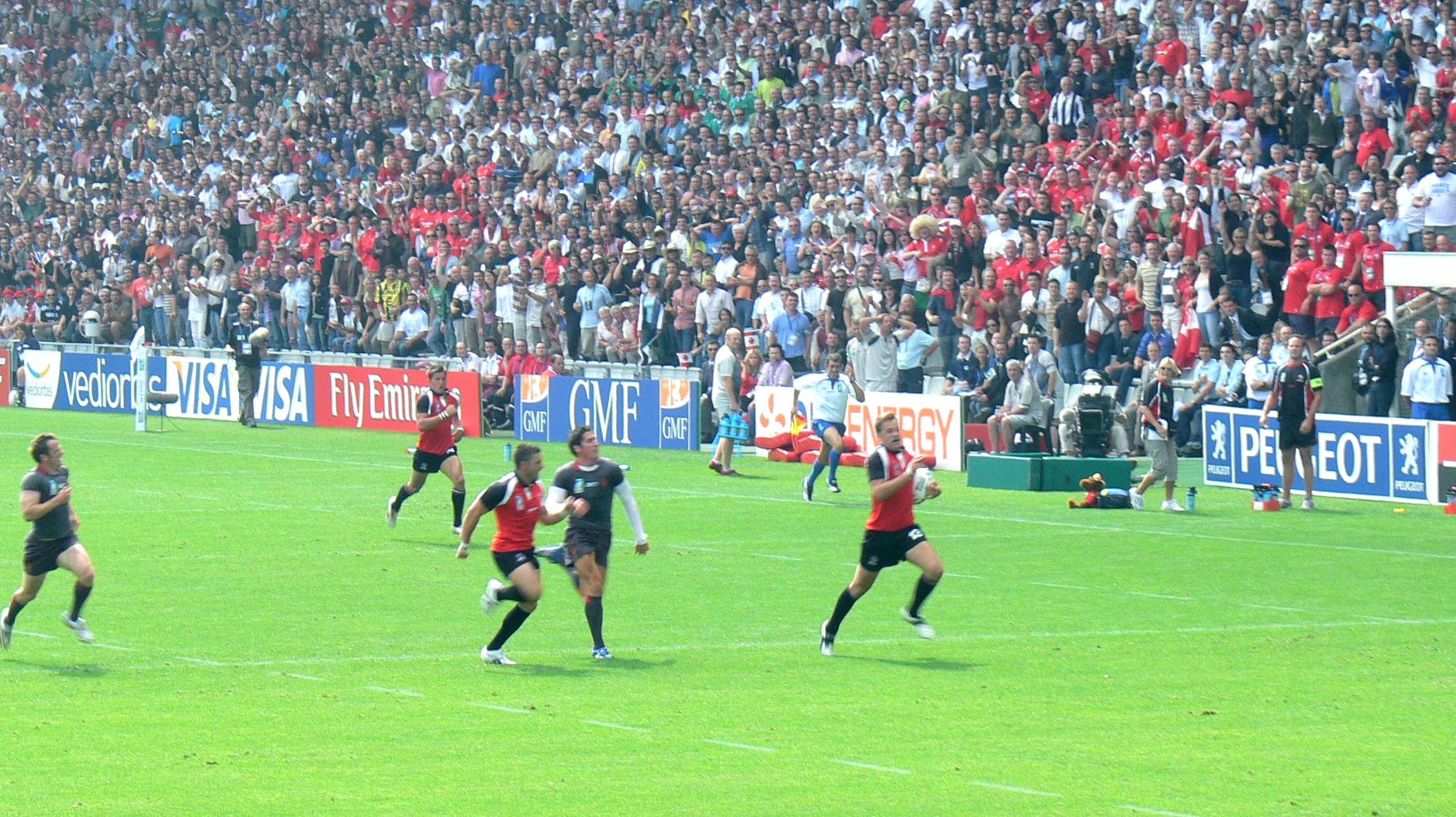
Canada take on Wales during the 2007 World Cup

The Canada national rugby union team has played in every Rugby World Cup except 2023 since the inaugural tournament in 1987. Their best performance was in 1991, when they beat Fiji and Romania, qualifying for the quarter-finals, where they lost to New Zealand.

Canada has the second strongest national rugby side in North America after the United States, and the fifth strongest in the Americas after Argentina, the United States, Uruguay and Chile.

Nation	Number of appearances	First appearance	Most recent appearance	Streak	Best result
Canada	9	1987	2019	9	Quarter finals, 1991

== Summary of results by tournament ==
Rugby World Cup record									Qualification						
Year	Round	Pld	W	D	L	PF	PA	Squad	Pos	Pld	W	D	L	PF	PA
(New Zealand) (Australia) 1987	Pool stage	3	1	0	2	65	90	Squad	Invited						
(England) (France) (Ireland) (Scotland) (Wales) 1991	Quarter-finals	4	2	0	2	58	62	Squad	1st	4	3	0	1	67	38
(South Africa) 1995	Pool stage	3	1	0	2	45	50	Squad	Automatically qualified						
(Wales) 1999	Pool stage	3	1	0	2	114	82	Squad	2nd	3	2	0	1	97	83
(Australia) 2003	Pool stage	4	1	0	3	54	135	Squad	1st	6	5	0	1	192	80
(France) 2007	Pool stage	4	0	1	3	51	120	Squad	1st	2	2	0	0	125	10
(New Zealand) 2011	Pool stage	4	1	1	2	82	168	Squad	P/O	2	1	0	1	47	30
(England) 2015	Pool stage	4	0	0	4	58	131	Squad	P/O	2	2	0	0	40	20
(Japan) 2019	Pool stage	4	0	1	3	14	177	Squad	P/O	7	3	1	3	225	89
(France) 2023	Did not qualify								P/O	4	2	0	2	96	113
(Australia) 2027	Qualified								2nd	4	1	0	3	49	77
(United States) 2031	To be determined								To be determined						
Total	—	33	7	3	23	541	1015	—	—	34	21	1	12	938	640
Champions; Runners–up; Third place; Fourth place; Home venue

During Typhoon Hagibis; Namibia v Canada was to be cancelled and recorded as 0–0 draw

== By match ==
=== 1987 Rugby World Cup ===
For the names of all Canada 1987 Rugby World Cup squad members, see 1987 Rugby World Cup squads#Canada.

Pool 2 games -

Team	Pld	W	D	L	PF	PA	PD	T	Pts	Qualification
Wales	3	3	0	0	82	31	+51	13	6	Knockout stage
Ireland	3	2	0	1	84	41	+43	11	4	Knockout stage
Canada	3	1	0	2	65	90	−25	8	2	
Tonga	3	0	0	3	29	98	−69	3	0	

24 May 1987

Canada	37–4	Tonga
Try: Palmer (2); Vaesen (2); Stuart; Frame; Penalty try Con: Wyatt (2); Gareth Rees; Pen: Rees	Report	Try: Valu

McLean Park, Napier
Attendance: 7,000
Referee: Clive Norling (Wales)

30 May 1987

Canada	19–46	Ireland
Try: Cardinal; Pen: Rees (3); Wyatt; Drop: Rees	Report	Try: Crossan (2); Bradley; Spillane; Ringland; MacNeill; Con: Kiernan (5); Pen: Kiernan (2); Drop: Ward; Kiernan

Carisbrook, Dunedin
Attendance: 9,000
Referee: Fred Howard (England)

3 June 1987

Canada	9–40	Wales
Pen: Rees (3)	Report	Try: Evans (4); Devereux; Bowen; Hadley; Phillips; Con: Thorburn (4)

Rugby Park, Invercargill
Attendance: 14,000
Referee: Dave Bishop (New Zealand)

=== 1991 Rugby World Cup ===
Pool 4 games -

Team	Pld	W	D	L	PF	PA	PD	Pts
France	3	3	0	0	82	25	+57	6
Canada	3	2	0	1	45	33	+12	4
Romania	3	1	0	2	31	64	−33	2
Fiji	3	0	0	3	27	63	−36	0

5 October 1991

Canada	13–3	Fiji
Try: Stewart; Pen: Rees (3)		Drop: Serevi

Stade Jean Dauger, Bayonne
Referee: Kerry Fitzgerald (Australia)

9 October 1991

Canada	19–11	Romania
Tries: McKinnon, Ennis; Con: Mark Wyatt; Pen: Wyatt (2); Drop: Rees		Tries: Lungu, Sasu; Pen: Nichitean

Stade Ernest-Wallon, Toulouse
Referee: Sandy MacNeill (Australia)

13 October 1991

France	19–13	Canada
Tries: Lafond, Saint-André; Con: Camberabero; Pen: Lacroix (2), Camberabero		Tries: Wyatt; Pen: Wyatt, Rees; Drop: Rees

Stade Armandie, Agen
Referee: Stephen Hilditch (Ireland)

Quarter-final

20 October 1991

Canada	13–29	New Zealand
Tries: Tynan, Charron; Con: Rees; Pen: Wyatt		Tries: Timu (2), McCahill, Brooke, Kirwan; Con: Fox (3); Pen: Fox

Stadium Lille-Metropole, Villeneuve d'Ascq
Referee: Fred Howard (England)

=== 1995 Rugby World Cup ===
Pool A games -

Team	Pld	W	D	L	PF	PA	PD	Pts
South Africa	3	3	0	0	68	26	+42	9
Australia	3	2	0	1	87	41	+46	7
Canada	3	1	0	2	45	50	−5	5
Romania	3	0	0	3	14	97	−83	3

26 May 1995

Canada	34–3	Romania
Tries: Al Charron, Colin McKenzie, Rod Snow; Con: Gareth Rees (2); Pen: Gareth Rees (4)		Pen: Neculai Nichitean

Boet Erasmus Stadium, Port Elizabeth
Attendance: 18,000
Referee: Colin Hawke (New Zealand)

31 May 1995

Australia	27–11	Canada
Tries: Michael Lynagh, Tabua Tamanivalu, Joe Roff; Con: Michael Lynagh (3); Pen: Michael Lynagh (2)		Tries: Al Charron; Pen: Gareth Rees (2)

Boet Erasmus Stadium, Port Elizabeth
Attendance: 15,000
Referee: Patrick Robin (France)

3 June 1995

South Africa	20–0	Canada
Tries: Adriaan Richter (2); Con: Joel Stransky (2); Pen: Joel Stransky (2)

Boet Erasmus Stadium, Port Elizabeth
Attendance: 31,000
Referee: David McHugh (Ireland)

=== 1999 Rugby World Cup ===
Pool 3 games -

Team	Pld	W	D	L	PF	PA	PD	Pts
France	3	3	0	0	108	52	+56	9
Fiji	3	2	0	1	124	68	+56	7
Canada	3	1	0	2	114	82	+32	5
Namibia	3	0	0	3	42	186	−144	3

2 October 1999

France	33–20	Canada
Tries: Émile Ntamack, Stéphane Glas, Thomas Castaignède, Olivier Magne; Con: Richard Dourthe (2); Pen: Richard Dourthe (3)		Tries: Morgan Williams (2); Con: Bobby Ross, Gareth Rees; Pen: Bobby Ross, Gareth Rees

Stade de la Méditerranée, Béziers
Referee: Brian Campsall (England)

9 October 1999

Fiji	38–22	Canada
Tries: Viliame Satala (2), Marika Vunibaka, Fero Lasagavibau; Con: Nicky Little (3); Pen: Nicky Little (3); Drop: Nicky Little		Tries: Mike James; Con: Gareth Rees; Pen: Gareth Rees (4); Drop: Gareth Rees

Parc Lescure, Bordeaux
Referee: Ed Morrison (England)

14 October 1999

Canada	72–11	Namibia
Tries: Winston Stanley (2), Rod Snow (2), Kyle Nichols (2), Al Charron, Bobby Ross, Morgan Williams; Con: Gareth Rees (9); Pen: Gareth Rees (3)		Tries: Quinton Hough; Pen: Leandre Van Dyk (2)

Stadium Municipal, Toulouse
Referee: Andrew Cole (Australia)

=== 2003 Rugby World Cup ===
Group D games -

Team	Pld	W	D	L	PF	PA	PD	BP	Pts	Qualification
New Zealand	4	4	0	0	282	57	+225	4	20	Quarter-finals
Wales	4	3	0	1	132	98	+34	2	14	Quarter-finals
Italy	4	2	0	2	77	123	−46	0	8	
Canada	4	1	0	3	54	135	−81	1	5	
Tonga	4	0	0	4	46	178	−132	1	1	

12 October 2003

Wales	41–10	Canada
Tries: Parker, Cooper, M. Jones, Charvis, Thomas; Con: Harris (5); Pen: Harris (2)		Tries: Tkachuk; Con: Pritchard; Drop: Ross

Telstra Dome, Melbourne
Attendance: 24,874
Referee: Chris White (England)

17 October 2003

New Zealand	68–6	Canada
Tries: Ralph (2), So'oialo (2), Muliaina (4), Meeuws, Nonu; Con: Carter (9)		Pen: Barker (2)

Telstra Dome, Melbourne
Attendance: 38,899
Referee: Tony Spreadbury (England)

21 October 2003

Italy	19–14	Canada
Tries: Parisse; Con: Wakarua; Pen: Wakarua (4)		Tries: Fyffe; Pen: Barker (3)

Canberra Stadium
Attendance: 20,515
Referee: Paddy O'Brien (New Zealand)

29 October 2003

Canada	24–7	Tonga
Tries: Fauth, Abrams; Con: Pritchard; Pen: Ross (4)		Tries: Kivalu; Con: Hola

Wollongong Showground, Wollongong
Attendance: 15,630
Referee: Alain Rolland (Ireland)

=== 2007 Rugby World Cup ===
Pos	Team	Pld	W	D	L	PF	PA	PD	B	Pts	Qualification
1	Australia	4	4	0	0	215	41	+174	4	20	Qualified for the quarter-finals
2	Fiji	4	3	0	1	114	136	−22	3	15	Qualified for the quarter-finals
3	Wales	4	2	0	2	168	105	+63	4	12	Eliminated, automatic qualification for RWC 2011
4	Japan	4	0	1	3	64	210	−146	1	3	
5	Canada	4	0	1	3	51	120	−69	0	2	

9 September 2007
14:00

Wales	42–17	Canada
Try: Parker 52' c A. W. Jones 58' c S. Williams (2) 61' m, 63' c Charvis 68' c Con: S. Jones (4/5); Pen: Hook (3/4) 10', 15', 21'	Report	Tries: Cudmore 25' m Culpan 36' c Williams 45' m Con: Pritchard (1/3)

Stade de la Beaujoire, Nantes
Attendance: 37,500
Referee: Alain Rolland (Ireland)

16 September 2007
14:00

Fiji	29–16	Canada
Tries: Leawere 22' c Ratuvou (2) 28' m, 80+' c Delasau 42' c Con: Little (3/4); Pen: Little (1/3) 8'	Report	Tries: Smith 60' c Con: Pritchard (1/1); Pen: Pritchard (3/4) 4', 27', 74'

Millennium Stadium, Cardiff
Attendance: 45,000
Referee: Tony Spreadbury (England)

25 September 2007
18:00

Canada	12–12	Japan
Tries: Riordan 48' m Van der Merwe 65' c Con: Pritchard (1/1)	Report	Tries: Endo 12' m Taira 80+' c Con: Onishi (1/2)

Stade Chaban-Delmas, Bordeaux
Attendance: 33,810
Referee: Jonathan Kaplan (South Africa)

29 September 2007
15:00

Australia	37–6	Canada
Tries: Baxter 24' m Freier 34' m Smith 51' m Mitchell (2) 63' c, 65' m Latham 73' c Con: Shepherd (2/3); Pen: Huxley (1/1) 2'	Report	Pen: Pritchard (2/2) 42', 54'

Stade Chaban-Delmas, Bordeaux
Attendance: 35,200
Referee: Chris White (England)

=== 2011 Rugby World Cup ===
Pool A games

Pos	Team	Pld	W	D	L	PF	PA	PD	T	B	Pts	Qualification
1	New Zealand	4	4	0	0	240	49	+191	36	4	20	Advanced to the quarter-finals and qualified for the 2015 Rugby World Cup
2	France	4	2	0	2	124	96	+28	13	3	11	Advanced to the quarter-finals and qualified for the 2015 Rugby World Cup
3	Tonga	4	2	0	2	80	98	−18	7	1	9	Eliminated but qualified for 2015 Rugby World Cup
4	Canada	4	1	1	2	82	168	−86	9	0	6	
5	Japan	4	0	1	3	69	184	−115	8	0	2	

14 September 2011
17:00

Tonga	20–25	Canada
Tries: Piutau (2) 40', 52'; Con: Morath (2) 41', 53'; Pen: Morath (2) 42', 64'	Report	Tries: Sinclair 13'; Carpenter 67'; Mackenzie 73'; Con: Pritchard (2); Pen: Pritchard (2) 26', 45'

Northland Events Centre, Whangārei
Attendance: 24,874
Referee: Jonathan Kaplan (South Africa)

18 September 2011
20:30

France	46–19	Canada
Tries: Clerc (3) 4', 78', 80+'; Traille 64'; Con: Parra (4) 5', 64', 80', 80+'; Pen: Parra (5) 16', 36', 38', 41', 47'	Report	Tries: Smith 7'; Con: Pritchard 7; Pen: Pritchard (2) 2', 60'

McLean Park, Napier
Attendance: 38,899
Referee: Craig Joubert (South Africa)

27 September 2011

Canada	23–23	Japan
Tries: Van der Merwe 6'; Mackenzie 44'; Monro 75'; Con: Pritchard 7'; Pen: Monro (2) 63', 78'	Report	Tries: Horie 9'; Endo 39'; Con: Arlidge (2) 10', 40'; Pen: Arlidge (3) 23', 65', 72'

Canberra Stadium
Attendance: 20,515
Referee: Jonathan Kaplan (South Africa)

2 October 2011

New Zealand	79–15	Canada
Tries: Guildford (4) 7', 24', 35', 76'; Vito (2) 11', 80'; Dagg 20'; Muliaina 29'; Cowan 44'; Kaino (2) 51', 67'; Williams 59'; Con:Slade (4) 8', 30', 45', 52'; Weepu (4) 61', 68', 78', 80'; Pen: Slade (1/1) 15'	Report	Tries: Trainor (2) 40', 42'; Con: Monro 42'; Pen: Monro 2'

Wellington Regional Stadium, Wellington
Attendance: 37,665
Referee: Romain Poite (France)

=== 2015 Rugby World Cup ===
Pool D games

Pos	Team	Pld	W	D	L	PF	PA	PD	T	B	Pts	Qualification
1	Ireland	4	4	0	0	134	35	+99	16	2	18	Advanced to the quarter-finals and qualified for the 2019 Rugby World Cup
2	France	4	3	0	1	120	63	+57	12	2	14	Advanced to the quarter-finals and qualified for the 2019 Rugby World Cup
3	Italy	4	2	0	2	74	88	−14	7	2	10	Eliminated but qualified for 2019 Rugby World Cup
4	Romania	4	1	0	3	60	129	−69	7	0	4	
5	Canada	4	0	0	4	58	131	−73	7	2	2	

19 September 2015
14:30

Ireland	50–7	Canada
Try: O'Brien 18' c Henderson 25' c Sexton 28' m D. Kearney 35' c Cronin 66' c R. Kearney 73' c Payne 76' c Con: Sexton (3/4) 19',26', 37'; Madigan (3/3) 67', 74', 77'; Pen: Sexton (1/1) 14'	Report	Try: Van der Merwe 68' c Con: Hirayama (1/1) 69'

Millennium Stadium, Cardiff
Attendance: 68,523
Referee: Glen Jackson (New Zealand)

26 September 2015
14:30

Italy	23–18	Canada
Try: Rizzo 17' c Garcia 58' c Con: Allan (2/2) 18', 59'; Pen: Allan (3/3) 25', 40', 80'	Report	Try: Van der Merwe 15' c Evans 44' m Con: Hirayama (1/2) 16'; Pen: Hirayama (2/3) 14', 72'

Elland Road, Leeds
Attendance: 33,120
Referee: George Clancy (Ireland)

1 October 2015
20:00

France	41–18	Canada
Try: Fofana 4' c Guirado 28' c Slimani 38' c Papé 67' c Grosso 74' c Con: Michalak (4/4) 5', 30', 39', 67'; Parra (1/1) 76'; Pen: Michalak (2/2) 14', 59'	Report	Try: Van der Merwe 31' c Carpenter 34' m Con: Hirayama (1/2) 32'; Pen: Hirayama (2/2) 42', 56'

Stadium mk, Milton Keynes
Attendance: 28,145
Referee: JP Doyle (England)

6 October 2015
16:45

Canada	15–17	Romania
Try: Van der Merwe 33' m Hassler 44' c Con: Hirayama (1/1) 45'; Pen: McRorie (1/4) 11'	Report	Try: Macovei (2) 53' c, 74' c Con: Vlaicu (2/2) 54', 75'; Pen: Vlaicu (1/2) 78'

Leicester City Stadium, Leicester
Attendance: 27,156
Referee: Wayne Barnes (England)

=== 2019 Rugby World Cup ===
Pool B Games

Pos	Team	Pld	W	D	L	PF	PA	PD	T	B	Pts	Qualification
1	New Zealand	4	3	1	0	157	22	+135	22	2	16	Advanced to the quarter-finals and qualified for the 2023 Rugby World Cup
2	South Africa	4	3	0	1	185	36	+149	27	3	15	Advanced to the quarter-finals and qualified for the 2023 Rugby World Cup
3	Italy	4	2	1	1	98	78	+20	14	2	12	Eliminated but qualified for 2023 Rugby World Cup
4	Namibia	4	0	1	3	34	175	−141	3	0	2	
5	Canada	4	0	1	3	14	177	−163	2	0	2	

26 September 2019
16:45 JST (UTC+09)

(1 BP) Italy	48–7	Canada
Try: Steyn 8' c Budd 13' c Negri 44' c Penalty try 59'; Bellini 62' m Zani 73' c Minozzi 79' m Con: Allan (3/4) 9', 14', 45'; Canna (1/2) 74'; Pen: Allan (1/1) 3'	Report	Try: Coe 69' c Con: Nelson (1/1) 71'

Fukuoka Hakatanomori Stadium, Fukuoka
Attendance: 16,984
Referee: Nigel Owens (Wales)

2 October 2019
19:15 JST (UTC+09)

(1 BP) New Zealand	63–0	Canada
Try: Penalty try 5'; J. Barrett 9' c Williams 17' c B. Barrett 36' c Ioane 41' c S. Barrett 45' c Frizell 47' c Weber (2) 50' c, 57' c Con: Mo'unga (8/8) 10', 19', 37', 43', 46', 49', 51', 59'	Report

Oita Stadium, Ōita
Attendance: 34,411
Referee: Romain Poite (France)

8 October 2019
19:15 JST (UTC+09)

(1 BP) South Africa	66–7	Canada
Try: de Allende 3' c Nkosi 6' m Reinach (3) 10' c, 18' c, 21' c Gelant 28' c Steyn 40'+1 c Brits 55' c Willemse 66' c Malherbe 73' m Con: E. Jantjies (8/10) 3', 12', 20', 22', 29', 40'+2, 56', 68'	Report	Try: Heaton 46' c Con: Nelson (1/1) 48'

Kobe Misaki Stadium, Kobe
Attendance: 28,014
Referee: Luke Pearce (England)

13 October 2019
12:15 JST (UTC+09)

Namibia	0–0 (Cancelled)	Canada

Kamaishi Recovery Memorial Stadium, Kamaishi
Referee: Paul Williams (New Zealand)

Notes:

- Despite both teams naming their sides, this match was cancelled following an evacuation order in Kamaishi during Typhoon Hagibis and awarded as a 0–0 draw.

== World Cup records ==
=== Overall record ===
Opponent	Played	Win	Draw	Lost	Win %
Australia	2	0	0	2	0%
Fiji	3	1	0	2	34%
France	4	0	0	4	0%
Ireland	2	0	0	2	0%
Italy	3	0	0	3	0%
Japan	2	0	2	0	0%
Namibia	1	1	0	0	100%
New Zealand	4	0	0	4	0%
Romania	3	2	0	1	67%
South Africa	2	0	0	2	0%
Tonga	3	3	0	0	100%
Wales	3	0	0	3	0%
Overall	33	7	3	23	21%

=== Team records ===
Most points scored in a game

- 72 vs Namibia (1999)
- 37 vs Tonga (1987)
- 34 vs Romania (1995)
- 25 vs Tonga (2011)
- 23 vs Japan (2011)

Biggest winning margin

- 61 vs Namibia (1999)
- 33 vs Tonga (1987)
- 31 vs Romania (1995)
- 17 vs Tonga (2003)
- 10 vs Fiji (1991)

Most points conceded in a game

- 79 vs New Zealand (2011)
- 68 vs New Zealand (2003)
- 66 vs South Africa (2019)
- 63 vs New Zealand (2019)
- 50 vs Ireland (2015)

Biggest losing margin

- 64 vs New Zealand (2011)
- 63 vs New Zealand (2019)
- 62 vs New Zealand (2003)
- 59 vs South Africa (2019)
- 43 vs Ireland (2015)

Most tries scored in a game

- 9 vs Namibia (1999)
- 7 vs Tonga (1987)
- 3 vs Romania (1995)
- 3 vs Tonga (2011)
- 3 vs Japan (2011)

=== Individual records ===
Most World Cup matches

- 15 D. T. H. van der Merwe 2007–2019
- 14 Rod Snow 1995–2007
- 14 Jamie Cudmore 2003–2015
- 13 Gareth Rees 1987–1999
- 12 Al Charron 1991–2003
- 12 Aaron Carpenter 2007–2015

Most points overall

- 120 Gareth Rees
- 45 James Pritchard
- 30 D. T. H. van der Merwe
- 25 Bobby Ross
- 25 Mark Wyatt

Most points in a game

- 27 vs Namibia – Gareth Rees 1999
- 19 vs Romania – Gareth Rees 1995
- 14 vs Fiji – Gareth Rees 1999
- 10 vs Tonga – James Pritchard 2011

Most tries overall

- 6 D. T. H. van der Merwe 2007, 2011, 2015
- 4 Al Charron 1991, 1995, 1999
- 4 Morgan Williams 1999, 2007
- 3 Rod Snow 1995, 1999

Most tries in a game

- 2 vs Tonga – Pat Palmer 1987
- 2 vs Tonga – Paul Vaesen 1987
- 2 vs Namibia – Winston Stanley 1999
- 2 vs Namibia – Rod Snow 1999
- 2 vs Namibia – Kyle Nichols 1999
- 2 vs New Zealand – Conor Trainor 2011

Most penalty goals overall

- 25 Gareth Rees
- 9 James Pritchard
- 5 Jared Barker
- 5 Bobby Ross
- 5 Mark Wyatt

Most penalty goals in a game

- 4 vs Tonga – Gareth Rees 2003
- 4 vs Romania – Gareth Rees 1995
- 4 vs Fiji – Gareth Rees 1999

Most drop goals in a game

- 2 vs France – Ander Monro 2011
- 1 vs Ireland – Gareth Rees 1987
- 1 vs Wales – Bobby Ross 2003
- 1 vs Fiji – Gareth Rees 1999
- 1 vs Romania – Gareth Rees 1995
- 1 vs France – Gareth Rees 1991
- 1 vs Romania – Gareth Rees 1991
