= 1999 Rugby World Cup =

Rugby union championship

Welsh: Cwpan Rygbi'r Byd 1999

Tournament details
- Host nation: Wales
- Venue: 18 (in 18 host cities)
- Dates: 1 October – 6 November 1999
- No. of nations: 20 (65 qualifying)

Final positions
- Champions: Australia (2nd title)
- Runner-up: France
- Third place: South Africa

Tournament statistics
- Matches played: 41
- Attendance: 1,562,427 (38,108 per match)
- Top scorer(s): (Argentina) Gonzalo Quesada (102)
- Most tries: (New Zealand) Jonah Lomu (8)

The 1999 Rugby World Cup (Welsh: Cwpan Rygbi'r Byd 1999) was the fourth Rugby World Cup, the quadrennial international rugby union championship. It was the first Rugby World Cup to be held in the sport's professional era.

Four automatic qualification places were available for the 1999 tournament; Wales qualified automatically as hosts, and the other three places went to the top three teams from the previous World Cup in 1995: champions South Africa, runners-up New Zealand and third-placed France. 63 nations took part in the qualification process, with 14 nations progressing directly to the tournament. the remaining two qualifiers were determined by a repechage, introduced for the first time in the tournaments history. This was also the first World Cup to feature 20 teams (expanded from 16).

The 20 teams were divided into five pools of four. The winner of each pool progressed to the last eight automatically, with the remaining quarter-finalists determined by three play-off matches, played between the runners-up from each pool and the best third-placed team. The tournament began with the opening ceremony in the newly constructed Millennium Stadium, with Wales beating Argentina 23–18, and Colin Charvis scoring the first try of the tournament.

Australia won the tournament, becoming the first nation to do so twice and also to date the only team ever to win after having to qualify for the tournament, with a 35–12 triumph over France, who were unable to repeat their semi-final victory over pre-tournament favourites New Zealand. The overall attendance for the tournament was 1.75 million.

== Qualifying ==
The following 20 teams, shown by region, qualified for the 1999 Rugby World Cup. Of the 20 teams, only four of those places were automatically allocated and did not have to play any qualification matches. These went to the champions, runners-up and the third-placed nations at the 1995 and the tournament host, Wales. A record 65 nations from five continents were therefore involved in the qualification process designed to fill the remaining 16 spots.

Africa	Americas	Europe	Oceania/Asia
Namibia (Africa); South Africa	Argentina (Americas 1); Canada (Americas 2); United States (Americas 3); Uruguay (Repechage 2)	England (Europe 2); France; Ireland (Europe 1); Italy (Europe 5); Romania (Europe 4); Scotland (Europe 3); Spain (Europe 6); Wales	Australia (Oceania 1); Fiji (Oceania 2); New Zealand; Samoa (Oceania 3); Tonga (Repechage 1); Japan (Asia)

== Venues ==
Wales won the right to host the World Cup in 1999. The centrepiece venue for the tournament was the Millennium Stadium, built on the site of the old National Stadium at Cardiff Arms Park at a cost of £126 million from Lottery money and private investment. Other venues in Wales were the Racecourse Ground and Stradey Park. An agreement was reached so that the other unions in the Five Nations Championship (England, France, Ireland and Scotland) also hosted matches.

Venues in England included Twickenham Stadium and Welford Road Stadium, rugby union venues, as well as Ashton Gate Stadium in Bristol, which normally hosts football, and the McAlpine Stadium in Huddersfield, which normally hosts football and rugby league. Scottish venues included Murrayfield Stadium, the home of the Scottish Rugby Union; Hampden Park, the home of the Scottish Football Association; and the smallest venue in the 1999 tournament, Netherdale, in Galashiels, in the Scottish Borders. Venues in Ireland included Lansdowne Road, the traditional home of the Irish Rugby Football Union; Ravenhill Stadium; and Thomond Park. France used five venues, the most of any nation, including the French national stadium, Stade de France, which hosted the final of the 1998 FIFA World Cup, and would later go on to host the finals of both the 2007 and 2023 editions of the tournament.

(Wales) Cardiff	(Wales) Wrexham	(Wales) Llanelli	(France) Saint-Denis
Millennium Stadium	Racecourse Ground	Stradey Park	Stade de France
Capacity: 74,500	Capacity: 15,500	Capacity: 10,800	Capacity: 80,000
(England) London	(Scotland) Edinburgh	(Scotland) Glasgow	(Ireland) Dublin
Twickenham Stadium	Murrayfield Stadium	Hampden Park	Lansdowne Road
Capacity: 75,000	Capacity: 67,500	Capacity: 52,500	Capacity: 49,250
(France) Lens	(France) Bordeaux	(France) Toulouse	(England) Huddersfield
Stade Félix Bollaert	Parc Lescure	Stadium de Toulouse	McAlpine Stadium
Capacity: 41,800	Capacity: 38,327	Capacity: 37,000	Capacity: 24,500
(England) Bristol	(France) Béziers	(England) Leicester	(Ireland) Limerick
Ashton Gate Stadium	Stade de la Méditerranée	Welford Road Stadium	Thomond Park
Capacity: 21,500	Capacity: 18,000	Capacity: 16,500	Capacity: 13,500
(Ireland) Belfast	(Scotland) Galashiels		
Ravenhill	Netherdale		
Capacity: 12,500	Capacity: 6,000		

== Pools and format ==
Pool A	Pool B	Pool C	Pool D	Pool E
South Africa; Scotland; Spain; Uruguay	New Zealand; England; Italy; Tonga	France; Fiji; Canada; Namibia	Wales; Argentina; Samoa; Japan	Australia; Ireland; United States; Romania

With the expansion of the Rugby World Cup from 16 to 20 teams an unusual and complex format was used with the teams split into five pools of four teams with each team playing each other in their pool once.

- Pool A was played in Scotland
- Pool B was played in England
- Pool C was played in France
- Pool D was played in the principal host nation Wales
- Pool E was played in Ireland

Points system

The points system that was used in the pool stage was unchanged from both 1991 and 1995:

- 3 points for a win
- 2 points for a draw
- 1 point for playing

The five pool winners qualified automatically to the quarter-finals. The five pool runners-up and the best third-placed side qualified for the quarter-final play-offs.

Knock-out stage

The five pool runners-up and the best third-placed team from the pool stage (which was Argentina) contested the quarter-final play-offs in three one-off matches that decided the remaining three places in the quarter-finals, with the losers being eliminated. The unusual format meant that two pool winners in the quarter-finals would have to play each other. From the quarter-final stage it became a simple knockout tournament. The semi-final losers played off for third place. The draw and format for the knock-out stage was set as follows.

Quarter-final play-offs draw

- Match H: Pool B runner-up v Pool C runner-up
- Match G: Pool A runner-up v Pool D runner-up
- Match F: Pool E runner-up v Best third-placed team

Quarter-finals draw

- Match M: Pool D winners v Pool E winners
- Match J: Pool A winners v Play-off H winners
- Match L: Pool C winners v Play-off F winners
- Match K: Pool B winners v Play-off G winners

Semi-finals draw

- Match J winners v Match M winners
- Match L winners v Match K winners

A total of 41 matches (30 pool stage and 11 knock-out) were played throughout the tournament over 35 days from 1 October 1999 to 6 November 1999.

== Referees ==
- (Australia) Andrew Cole
- (Australia) Stuart Dickinson
- (Australia) Wayne Erickson
- (Australia) Peter Marshall
- (England) Brian Campsall
- (England) Ed Morrison
- (England) Chris White
- (France) Joël Dumé
- (Ireland) David McHugh
- (New Zealand) Colin Hawke
- (New Zealand) Paul Honiss
- (New Zealand) Paddy O'Brien
- (South Africa) André Watson
- (Scotland) Jim Fleming
- (Wales) Derek Bevan
- (Wales) Clayton Thomas

== Pool stage ==
The tournament began on 1 October 1999 in the newly built Millennium Stadium in Cardiff, with Wales beating Argentina in a hard-fought game 23–18 to get their campaign off to a positive start. The Pool stage of the tournament played out as was widely expected with the Tri Nations teams of New Zealand (who inflected a massive 101–3 win against Italy at the McAlpine Stadium in Huddersfield), South Africa and Australia all winning their pools easily without losing a single game. For the then Five Nations Championship teams who all played their pool matches in their own countries it was a case of mixed fortunes with France winning their pool without losing a game. Host Wales also won their pool, though they suffered 31–38 defeat at the hands of Samoa in front of a home crowd at the Millennium Stadium. However, as expected England, Ireland and Scotland all finished second in their pools and were forced to try to qualify for the quarter-finals via the play-offs alongside fellow runners-up Samoa and Fiji, and Argentina as the best third placed side from all five pools, having been the only third-placed side to win two matches (against Samoa and Japan). Indeed, Argentina had finished level with Wales and Samoa on 7 points each in the group stages, and could only be separated by "total points scored": playing and winning their final match against Japan, they had the chance to overtake either of Samoa or Wales, but were 14 points short of overtaking Samoa's total score and a further 18 points short of Wales.

Qualified for quarter-finals
Qualified for quarter-final play-offs

=== Pool A ===
Team	P	W	D	L	PF	PA	Pts
South Africa	3	3	0	0	132	35	9
Scotland	3	2	0	1	120	58	7
Uruguay	3	1	0	2	42	97	5
Spain	3	0	0	3	18	122	3

2 October 1999
15:00 WEST/GMT+01 (UTC+01)

Spain	15–27	Uruguay
Pen: Kovalenco (5) 7', 40', 48', 50', 68'	Report	Try: Ormaechea 23' c Penalty try 64' c Cardoso 77' m Menchaca 80' m Con: Aguirre; Sciarra; Pen: Aguirre 15'

Netherdale, Galashiels
Attendance: 3,761
Referee: Chris White (England)

3 October 1999
17:00 WEST/GMT+01 (UTC+01)

Scotland	29–46	South Africa
Try: M. Leslie; Tait; Con: Logan (2); Pen: Logan (4); Drop: Townsend		Try: Le Roux; Kayser; Van der Westhuizen; Fleck; A. Venter; B. Venter; Con: De Beer (5); Pen: De Beer (2)

Murrayfield Stadium, Edinburgh
Attendance: 57,612
Referee: Colin Hawke (New Zealand)

8 October 1999
16:00 WEST/GMT+01 (UTC+01)

Scotland	43–12	Uruguay
Try: Russell; Armstrong; Metcalfe; M. Leslie; Simpson; Townsend; Con: Logan (5); Pen: Logan		Pen: Aguirre (3); Sciarra

Murrayfield Stadium, Edinburgh
Attendance: 9,463
Referee: Stuart Dickinson (Australia)

10 October 1999
17:00 WEST/GMT+01 (UTC+01)

South Africa	47–3	Spain
Try: Vos (2); Leonard; Penalty try Muller; Skinstad; Swanepoel; Con: De Beer (6)		Pen: Velazco Querol

Murrayfield Stadium, Edinburgh
Attendance: 4,769
Referee: Paul Honiss (New Zealand)

15 October 1999
17:00 WEST/GMT+01 (UTC+01)

South Africa	39–3	Uruguay
Try: Van den Berg (2); Van der Westhuizen; Kayser; Fleck; Con: De Beer (4); Pen: De Beer (2)		Pen: Aguirre

Hampden Park, Glasgow
Attendance: 3,500
Referee: Peter Marshall (Australia)

16 October 1999
15:00 WEST/GMT+01 (UTC+01)

Scotland	48–0	Spain
Try: Mather (2); McLaren; Longstaff; Hodge; C. Murray; Penalty try Con: Hodge (5); Pen: Hodge

Murrayfield Stadium, Edinburgh
Attendance: 17,593
Referee: Clayton Thomas (Wales)

=== Pool B ===
Team	P	W	D	L	PF	PA	Pts
New Zealand	3	3	0	0	176	28	9
England	3	2	0	1	184	47	7
Tonga	3	1	0	2	47	171	5
Italy	3	0	0	3	35	196	3

2 October 1999
17:00 WEST/GMT+01 (UTC+01)

England	67–7	Italy
Try: Wilkinson; Hill; Luger; Back; De Glanville; Corry; Dawson; Perry; Con: Wilkinson (6); Pen: Wilkinson (5)		Try: Dominguez; Con: Dominguez

Twickenham Stadium, London
Attendance: 73,470
Referee: André Watson (South Africa)

3 October 1999
15:00 WEST/GMT+01 (UTC+01)

New Zealand	45–9	Tonga
Try: Lomu (2); Kelleher; Maxwell; Kronfeld; Con: Mehrtens (4); Pen: Mehrtens (4)		Pen: Taumalolo (3)

Ashton Gate Stadium, Bristol
Attendance: 22,000
Referee: Derek Bevan (Wales)

9 October 1999
16:30 WEST/GMT+01 (UTC+01)

England	16–30	New Zealand
Try: De Glanville; Con: Wilkinson; Pen: Wilkinson (3)		Try: Kelleher; Wilson; Lomu; Con: Mehrtens (3); Pen: Mehrtens (3)

Twickenham Stadium, London
Attendance: 72,000
Referee: Peter Marshall (Australia)

10 October 1999
19:00 WEST/GMT+01 (UTC+01)

Italy	25–28	Tonga
Try: Moscardi; Con: Dominguez; Pen: Dominguez (6)		Try: Taufahema; Fatani; Tuipulotu; Con: Tuipulotu (2); Pen: Tuipulotu (2); Drop: Tuipulotu

Welford Road Stadium, Leicester
Attendance: 10,244
Referee: David McHugh (Ireland)

14 October 1999
13:00 WEST/GMT+01 (UTC+01)

New Zealand	101–3	Italy
Try: Wilson (3); Osborne (2); Lomu (2); Randell; Brown; Cullen; Hammett; Gibson; Robertson; Mika; Con: Brown (11); Pen: Brown (3)		Pen: Dominguez

McAlpine Stadium, Huddersfield
Attendance: 24,000
Referee: Jim Fleming (Scotland)

15 October 1999
13:00 WEST/GMT+01 (UTC+01)

England	101–10	Tonga
Try: Guscott (2); Greening (2); Luger (2); Healey (2); Greenwood (2); Dawson; Perry; Hill; Con: Grayson (12); Pen: Grayson (4)		Try: Tiueti; Con: Tuipulotu; Pen: Tuipulotu

Twickenham Stadium, London
Attendance: 72,485
Referee: Wayne Erickson (Australia)

=== Pool C ===
Team	P	W	D	L	PF	PA	Pts
France	3	3	0	0	108	52	9
Fiji	3	2	0	1	124	68	7
Canada	3	1	0	2	114	82	5
Namibia	3	0	0	3	42	186	3

1 October 1999
21:00 CEST/GMT+2 (UTC+02)

Fiji	67–18	Namibia
Try: Lasagavibau (2); S. Tawake; Rauluni; Satala; Mocelutu; Smith; Tiko; Katalau; Con: Serevi (8); Pen: Serevi (2)		Try: Jacobs; Senekal; Con: Van Dyk; Pen: Van Dyk (2)

Stade de la Méditerranée, Béziers
Attendance: 10,000
Referee: David McHugh (Ireland)

2 October 1999
14:00 CEST/GMT+2 (UTC+02)

France	33–20	Canada
Try: Ntamack; Glas; Castaignède; Magne; Con: Dourthe (2); Pen: Dourthe (3)		Try: Williams (2); Con: Ross; Rees; Pen: Ross; Rees

Stade de la Méditerranée, Béziers
Attendance: 18,000
Referee: Brian Campsall (England)

8 October 1999
21:00 CEST/GMT+2 (UTC+02)

France	47–13	Namibia
Try: Mola (3); Ntamack; Mignoni; Bernat-Salles; Con: Dourthe (4); Pen: Dourthe (3)		Try: Samuelson; Con: Van Dyk; Pen: Van Dyk (2)

Parc Lescure, Bordeaux
Attendance: 34,030
Referee: Chris White (England)

9 October 1999
13:30 CEST/GMT+2 (UTC+02)

Fiji	38–22	Canada
Try: Satala (2); Vunibaka; Lasagavibau; Con: Little (3); Pen: Little (3); Drop: Little		Try: James; Con: Rees; Pen: Rees (4); Drop: Rees

Parc Lescure, Bordeaux
Attendance: 27,000
Referee: Ed Morrison (England)

14 October 1999
20:30 CEST/GMT+2 (UTC+02)

Canada	72–11	Namibia
Try: Stanley (2); Snow (2); Nichols (2); Charron; Ross; Williams; Con: Rees (9); Pen: Rees (3)		Try: Hough; Pen: Van Dyk (2)

Stade de Toulouse
Attendance: 28,000
Referee: Andrew Cole (Australia)

16 October 1999
14:00 CEST/GMT+2 (UTC+02)

France	28–19	Fiji
Try: Juillet; Dominici; Penalty try Con: Dourthe (2); Pen: Dourthe (2); Lamaison		Try: Uluinayau; Con: Little; Pen: Little (4)

Stade de Toulouse
Attendance: 36,000
Referee: Paddy O'Brien (New Zealand)

=== Pool D ===
Team	P	W	D	L	PF	PA	Pts
Wales	3	2	0	1	118	71	7
Samoa	3	2	0	1	97	72	7
Argentina	3	2	0	1	83	51	7
Japan	3	0	0	3	36	140	3

1 October 1999
15:00 WEST/GMT+1 (UTC+01)

Wales	23–18	Argentina
Try: Charvis; Taylor; Con: Jenkins (2); Pen: Jenkins (3)		Pen: Quesada (6)

Millennium Stadium, Cardiff
Attendance: 72,500
Referee: Paddy O'Brien (New Zealand)

3 October 1999
13:00 WEST/GMT+1 (UTC+01)

Samoa	43–9	Japan
Try: Lima (2); So'oalo (2); Leaega; Con: Leaega (3); Pen: Leaega (4)		Pen: Hirose (3)

Racecourse Ground, Wrexham
Attendance: 15,000
Referee: Andrew Cole (Australia)

9 October 1999
14:30 WEST/GMT+1 (UTC+01)

Wales	64–15	Japan
Try: Taylor (2); Howley; Gibbs; Llewellyn; Thomas; Bateman; Howarth; Penalty try Con: Jenkins (8); Pen: Jenkins		Try: Tuidraki; Ohata; Con: Hirose; Pen: Hirose

Millennium Stadium, Cardiff
Attendance: 72,500
Referee: Joël Dume (France)

10 October 1999
13:00 WEST/GMT+1 (UTC+01)

Argentina	32–16	Samoa
Try: Allub; Pen: Quesada (8); Drop: Quesada		Try: Paramore; Con: Leaega; Pen: Leaega (3)

Stradey Park, Llanelli
Attendance: 11,000
Referee: Wayne Erickson (Australia)

14 October 1999
15:00 WEST/GMT+1 (UTC+01)

Wales	31–38	Samoa
Try: Thomas; Penalty try (2); Con: Jenkins (2); Pen: Jenkins (4)		Try: Bachop (2); Falaniko; Lam; Leaega; Con: Leaega (5); Pen: Leaega

Millennium Stadium, Cardiff
Attendance: 72,500
Referee: Ed Morrison (England)

16 October 1999
19:00 WEST/GMT+1 (UTC+01)

Argentina	33–12	Japan
Try: Albanese; Pichot; Con: Contepomi; Pen: Quesada (7)		Pen: Hirose (4)

Millennium Stadium, Cardiff
Attendance: 36,000
Referee: Stuart Dickinson (Australia)

=== Pool E ===
Team	P	W	D	L	PF	PA	Pts
Australia	3	3	0	0	135	31	9
Ireland	3	2	0	1	100	45	7
Romania	3	1	0	2	50	126	5
United States	3	0	0	3	52	135	3

2 October 1999
19:00 WEST/GMT+1 (UTC+01)

Ireland	53–8	United States
Try: Bishop; Wood (4); O'Driscoll; Penalty try Con: Humphreys (4); Elwood (2); Pen: Humphreys (2)	Report	Try: Dalzell; Pen: Dalzell

Lansdowne Road, Dublin
Attendance: 30,000
Referee: Joël Dume (France)

3 October 1999
19:00 WEST/GMT+1 (UTC+01)

Australia	57–9	Romania
Try: Kefu (3); Roff (2); Kafer; Burke; Little; Horan; Con: Burke (5); Eales	Report	Pen: Mitu (3)

Ravenhill Stadium, Belfast
Attendance: 12,500
Referee: Paul Honiss (New Zealand)

9 October 1999
19:00 WEST/GMT+1 (UTC+01)

United States	25–27	Romania
Try: Shuman; Hightower; Lyle; Con: Dalzell (2); Pen: Dalzell (2)	Report	Try: Petrache (2); Solomie (2); Con: Mitu (2); Pen: Mitu

Lansdowne Road, Dublin
Attendance: 3,000
Referee: Jim Fleming (Scotland)

10 October 1999
15:00 WEST/GMT+1 (UTC+01)

Ireland	3–23	Australia
Pen: Humphreys	Report	Try: Tune; Horan; Con: Burke (2); Pen: Burke (2); Eales

Lansdowne Road, Dublin
Attendance: 49,250
Referee: Clayton Thomas (Wales)

14 October 1999
17:00 WEST/GMT+1 (UTC+01)

Australia	55–19	United States
Try: Staniforth (2); Latham; Whitaker; Foley; Burke; Larkham; Strauss; Con: Burke (5); Roff; Pen: Burke	Report	Try: Grobler; Con: Dalzell; Pen: Dalzell (4)

Thomond Park, Limerick
Attendance: 13,000
Referee: André Watson (South Africa)

15 October 1999
19:00 WEST/GMT+1 (UTC+01)

Ireland	44–14	Romania
Try: O'Shea (2); Ward; Tierney; O'Cuinneagain; Con: Elwood (5); Pen: Elwood (2); Drop: O'Driscoll	Report	Try: Săuan; Pen: Mitu (3)

Lansdowne Road, Dublin
Attendance: 33,000
Referee: Brian Campsall (England)

=== Ranking of third-placed teams ===
Qualified for quarter-final play-offs

Pool	Team	W	D	L	PF	PA	PD	Pts
D	Argentina	2	0	1	83	51	32	7
C	Canada	1	0	2	114	82	32	5
A	Uruguay	1	0	2	42	97	-55	5
E	Romania	1	0	2	50	126	-76	5
B	Tonga	1	0	2	47	171	-124	5

== Play-off stage ==
The quarter-final play-offs were three one-off knock-out matches between the runners-up of each pool and the best third-placed side from all five pools to decide the remaining three places in the quarter-finals. The matches were played in mid-week between the completion of the pool stage and the start of the quarter-finals. The matches produced fairly easy wins for England, beating Fiji 45–24, and also for Scotland, beating Samoa 35–20. However, the final match produced the shock of the round where Argentina upset Ireland 28–24 in Lens.

=== Quarter-final play-offs ===
20 October 1999
13:00 WEST/GMT+1 (UTC+01)

England	45–24	Fiji
Try: Luger; Back; Beal; Greening; Con: Dawson; Wilkinson; Pen: Wilkinson (7)	Report	Try: Satala; Nakauta; Tiko; Con: Little (3); Pen: Serevi

Twickenham Stadium, London
Attendance: 55,000
Referee: Clayton Thomas (Wales)

20 October 1999
15:30 WEST/GMT+1 (UTC+01)

Scotland	35–20	Samoa
Try: C. Murray; M. Leslie; Penalty try Con: Logan; Pen: Logan (5); Drop: Townsend	Report	Try: Lima; Sititi; Con: Leaega (2); Pen: Leaega (2)

Murrayfield Stadium, Edinburgh
Attendance: 20,000
Referee: David McHugh (Ireland)

20 October 1999
20:30 CEST/GMT+2 (UTC+02)

Argentina	28–24	Ireland
Try: Albanese; Con: Quesada; Pen: Quesada (7)	Report	Pen: Humphreys (7); Drop: Humphreys

Stade Félix Bollaert, Lens
Attendance: 22,000
Referee: Stuart Dickinson (Australia)

== Knockout stage ==
The winners from the quarter-final play-offs, who had played in mid-week, joined the pool winners, who had enjoyed a week long rest, in the quarter-finals. England, hosts Wales and Scotland were all knocked out, and France, who beat Argentina, were the only team left from the Northern Hemisphere.

The semi-finals, which were both played at Twickenham Stadium, produced two of the most dramatic matches of the tournament, with Australia beating South Africa 27–21 in extra-time after normal time ended with the scores locked at 18-18. The second semi-final between favourites New Zealand and underdogs France was an all-time classic, as France overturned a 24–10 deficit to win 43–31 and reach their second World Cup final. France and Australia met at the Millennium Stadium on 6 November 1999, with Australia winning 35–12 to become the first team to win the Webb Ellis Cup twice. The cup was presented by Queen Elizabeth II to Australian captain John Eales.

The overall attendance for the tournament was 1.75 million.

Quarter-finals
24 October – Stade de France
South Africa	44
England	21
23 October – Millennium Stadium
Australia	24
Wales	9
24 October – Murrayfield
New Zealand	30
Scotland	18
24 October – Lansdowne Road
France	47
Argentina	26

Semi-finals
30 October – Twickenham
South Africa	21
Australia (a.e.t.)	27
31 October – Twickenham
New Zealand	31
France	43

Final
6 November – Millennium Stadium
Australia	35
France	12
Third place
4 November – Millennium Stadium
South Africa	22
New Zealand	18

=== Quarter-finals ===
23 October 1999
15:00 WEST/GMT+1 (UTC+01)

Wales	9–24	Australia
Pen: Jenkins (3)	Report	Try: Gregan (2); Tune; Con: Burke (3); Pen: Burke

Millennium Stadium, Cardiff
Attendance: 72,000
Referee: Colin Hawke (New Zealand)

24 October 1999
14:00 CEST/GMT+2 (UTC+02)

South Africa	44–21	England
Try: Van der Westhuizen; P. Rossouw; Con: De Beer (2); Pen: De Beer (5); Drop: De Beer (5)	Report	Pen: Grayson (6); Wilkinson

Stade de France, Saint-Denis
Attendance: 75,000
Referee: Jim Fleming (Scotland)

24 October 1999
18:00 WEST/GMT+1 (UTC+01)

Scotland	18–30	New Zealand
Try: C. Murray; Pountney; Con: Logan; Pen: Logan; Drop: Townsend	Report	Try: Umaga (2); Wilson; Lomu; Con: Mehrtens (2); Pen: Mehrtens (2)

Murrayfield Stadium, Edinburgh
Attendance: 59,750
Referee: Ed Morrison (England)

24 October 1999
15:30 WEST/GMT+1 (UTC+01)

Argentina	26–47	France
Try: Pichot; Arbizu; Con: Quesada (2); Pen: Quesada (3); Contepomi	Report	Try: Garbajosa (2); Bernat-Salles (2); Ntamack; Con: Lamaison (5); Pen: Lamaison (4)

Lansdowne Road, Dublin
Attendance: 40,000
Referee: Derek Bevan (Wales)

=== Semi-finals ===
30 October 1999
15:00 WEST/GMT+1 (UTC+01)

Australia	27–21 (a.e.t.)	South Africa
Pen: Burke (8); Drop: Larkham	Report	Pen: De Beer (6); Drop: De Beer

Twickenham Stadium, London
Attendance: 72,000
Referee: Derek Bevan (Wales)

31 October 1999
15:00 WET/GMT (UTC+00)

France	43–31	New Zealand
Try: Lamaison; Dominici; Dourthe; Bernat-Salles; Con: Lamaison (4); Pen: Lamaison (3); Drop: Lamaison (2)	Report	Try: Lomu (2); Wilson; Con: Mehrtens (2); Pen: Mehrtens (4)

Twickenham Stadium, London
Attendance: 70,000
Referee: Jim Fleming (Scotland)

=== Third-place play-off ===
4 November 1999
20:00 WET/GMT (UTC+00)

New Zealand	18–22	South Africa
Pen: Mehrtens (6)	Report	Try: Paulse; Con: Honiball; Pen: Honiball (3); Drop: Montgomery (2)

Millennium Stadium, Cardiff
Attendance: 60,000
Referee: Peter Marshall (Australia)

=== Final ===
6 November 1999
15:00 WET/GMT (UTC+00)

Australia	35–12	France
Try: Tune; Finegan; Con: Burke (2); Pen: Burke (7)	Report	Pen: Lamaison (4)

Millennium Stadium, Cardiff
Attendance: 72,500
Referee: André Watson (South Africa)

== Statistics ==
The tournament's top point scorer was Argentina's Gonzalo Quesada, who scored 102 points. Jonah Lomu scored eight tries, a Rugby World Cup record.

Top 10 point scorers
Player	Team	Position	Played	Tries	Conversions	Penalties	Drop goals	Total points
Gonzalo Quesada	Argentina	Fly-half	5	0	3	31	1	102
Matt Burke	Australia	Full-back	6	2	17	19	0	101
Jannie de Beer	South Africa	Fly-half	5	0	17	15	6	97
Andrew Mehrtens	New Zealand	First five-eighth	5	0	11	19	0	79
Jonny Wilkinson	England	Fly-half	4	1	8	16	0	69
Christophe Lamaison	France	Fly-half	6	1	9	12	2	65
Silao Leaega	Samoa	Wing	4	2	11	10	0	62
Neil Jenkins	Wales	Fly-half	4	0	12	11	0	57
Paul Grayson	England	Fly-half	4	0	12	10	0	54
Kenny Logan	Scotland	Wing	4	0	9	11	0	51

== Broadcasting ==
British television rights holders ITV acted as the host broadcaster for the tournament, with S4C also broadcasting matches in the Welsh language. with coverage shown in 209 countries, to an audience of 3.1 billion viewers. In Australia, the event was broadcast by Seven Network.

=== Broadcast UK history ===
- ITV (1 October 1999 – 6 November 1999)
- S4C (1 October 1999 – 6 November 1999)
