= Sateki Tuipulotu =

Tonga international rugby union player (born 1971)

Personal information
- Born: 3 July 1971 (age 55) Auckland, New Zealand
- Height: 5 ft 11 in (1.80 m)
- Weight: 203 lb (92 kg)

Playing information
- Position: Full-back
Club
Years	Team	Pld	T	G	FG	P
1996	Leeds	9				8

Rugby union career
- Position: Fullback
Amateur team(s)
Years	Team	Apps	(Points)
2002-2003	Parramatta		
Senior career
Years	Team	Apps	(Points)
1996-1999	Leeds	78	(773)
1999-2002	Worcester	58	(577)
International career
Years	Team	Apps	(Points)
1994-2003	Tonga	20	(190)

Sateki Tuipulotu (born 3 July 1971) is a former rugby union footballer who played internationally for Tonga.

Tuipulotu was born in Auckland, New Zealand. He first played for Tonga in 1994 against Wales. Playing at fullback, he was a regular player for Tonga until his retirement following the 2003 Rugby World Cup. He also played in the 1995 Rugby World Cup and 1999 Rugby World Cup where he helped kick Tonga to a victory over Italy with a drop goal as the last kick of the game. His last match for Tonga was their 91–7 loss to the All Blacks at the 2003 World Cup.

He is now head coach of the Penrith Emus who compete in the Shute Shield

Tuipulotu is also a coach in the Hills Sport High School Rugby Union.
