= Clayton Thomas =

Welsh rugby union referee (born 1949)

Clayton Thomas (born 22 September 1949) is a Welsh former rugby union referee. Born in Bryncoch, near Neath, he began refereeing international matches in 1994, and was part of the refereeing team for the 1995 and 1999 Rugby World Cups. He retired from international refereeing in 2001, having taken charge of 18 tests. He officiated his third Welsh Cup final at the end of the 2000–01 season.
