= Ian Birtwell =

English rugby union player and coach

Ian Birtwell (born 1944 (age 81–82)) is an English-born Canadian rugby union coach and a former player. He played as a scrum-half for Sedgley Park RUFC. Professionally, he was a research scientist heading the pollution and Toxicology Unit at the Department of Fisheries and Oceans in West Vancouver.

Birtwell played rugby union for Sedgley Park RUFC, a team in Manchester, arriving in Canada in 1972. He was a player at Meraloma Rugby, in Vancouver, later also being their coach. He was the coach of British Columbia from 1987 to 1989, and had the honour of coaching them in a match with New Zealand.

Birtwell took office as head coach of Canada, in October 1989, leading them to the 1991 Rugby World Cup finals, where the "Maple Leafs", with an extraordinary team, reached the quarter-finals. He was also in charge at the 1995 Rugby World Cup finals, where Canada had to face a very strong group, winning only Romania, by 34–3. Nevertheless, they had close matches with both Australia, lost by 27–11, and South Africa, lost by 20–0. He left office in 1996, being replaced by Patrick Parfrey.

Birtwell was briefly the interim head coach of Canada in 2001.
