= Imanueli Tiko =

- Born: Imanueli Tikomaimakogai; September 30, 1974 (age 52) Nausori, Fiji
- Height: 6 ft 0 in (183 cm)
- Weight: 188 lb (85 kg)

Rugby union career
- Position: Wing
- Current team: --
Senior career
Years	Team	Apps	(Points)
-	Lautoka		
International career
Years	Team	Apps	(Points)
1999–2000	Fiji	11	(45)

Imanueli Tiko (born 30 September 1974, in Lautoka) is a Fijian former rugby union player who played as wing.

== Career ==
He first played for Fiji on 22 May 1999, against United States, in San Francisco. Tiko was also part of the Fiji squad in the 1999 Rugby World Cup, playing two matches in the tournament. His last cap for Fiji was on 26 May 2000, against Tonga, in Nuku'alofa.
