= Canada men's national rugby union team =

Men's rugby union team

Canada
- Nicknames: Canucks; Les Rouges (The Reds); Beavers
- Emblem: Maple leaf
- Union: Rugby Canada
- Head coach: Steve Meehan
- Captain: Andrew Quattrin
- Most caps: Aaron Carpenter (80)
- Top scorer: James Pritchard (607)
- Top try scorer: D. T. H. van der Merwe (38)
- Home stadium: Various
First colours	Second colours

World Rugby ranking
- Current: 23 (as of 6 July 2026)
- Highest: 11 (2011)
- Lowest: 25 (2026)

First international
- Japan 9–8 Canada (Osaka, Japan; 31 January 1932)

Biggest win
- Barbados 3–69 Canada (Bridgetown, Barbados; 24 June 2006)

Biggest defeat
- England 70–0 Canada (London, England; 13 November 2004)

World Cup
- Appearances: 9 (first in 1987)
- Best result: Quarter-finals (1991)
- Website: rugby.ca/en

The Canada men's national rugby union team (French: Équipe du Canada de rugby à XV) represents Canada in men's international rugby union competitions. They are overseen by Rugby Canada the governing body of rugby union in Canada.

Canada is classified by World Rugby (WR) as a tier-two team and has competed in competitions such as the Americas Rugby Championship (ARC) and the Rugby World Cup (RWC). Canada traditionally plays in its national colours (red and white). Canada has been playing international rugby since their 1932 debut against Japan. They had competed at every Rugby World Cup from the inaugural tournament in 1987 until its elimination from the 2023 qualifiers, breaking the three decades long record of uninterrupted attendance.

Canada achieved their best result at the World Cup in 1991, where they reached the quarter-finals. Canada was once the dominant power of North American rugby and was the second-best team in the Americas, behind Argentina. Prior to the professionalization of rugby, Canada were known to upset stronger teams, having defeated France, Scotland, Wales, and an uncapped England side prior to 2002.

== History ==
=== Early years ===
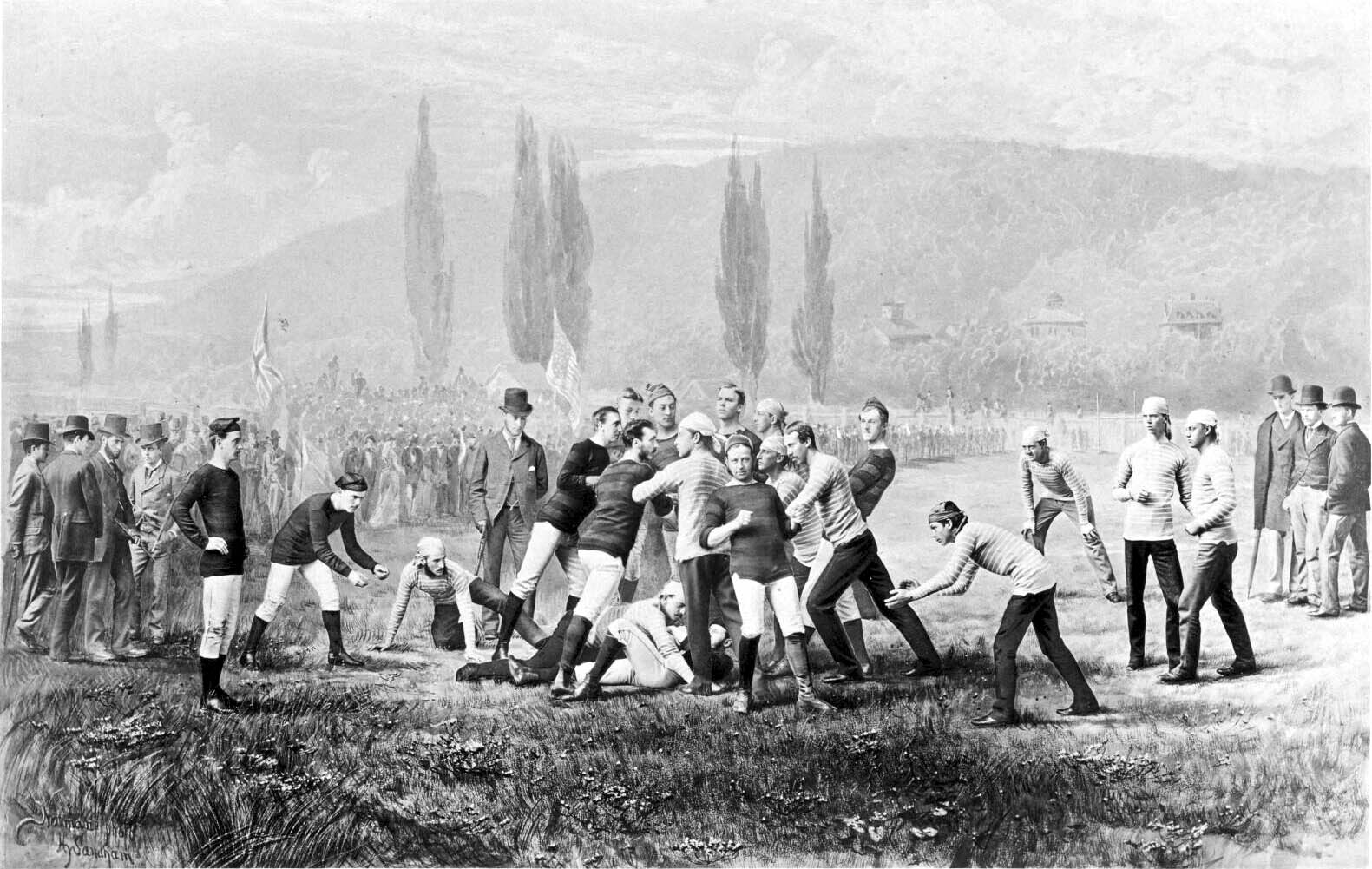
The Harvard–McGill game of 1874

In 1874 the first North American international game took place in Cambridge, Massachusetts between McGill and Harvard universities. The following day the two teams played under "McGill" rugby rules to a scoreless tie. In late 1874, the Harvard team traveled to Montreal to play McGill in rugby, and won by three tries in front of 2,000 spectators. An annual competition began in 1974 to mark the centennial of the 1874 meeting and is now known as the Covo Cup, using the original rules of rugby football. McGill University can therefore lay claim to being the oldest rugby club in Canada. Westmount Rugby Club is the oldest independent Canadian rugby club. To this day, the McGill University Rugby Football Club is one of the premier university sides in Canada. Since 1989 the team has won 15 RSEQ (Réseau du sport étudiant du Québec) Titles, including 8 straight from 2006 - 2013. In 2019, the side represented Quebec at the Canadian University Men's Rugby Championship, finishing 6th in the nation. McGill Rugby alumni have gone on to represent Canada on the world stage and join the ranks of professional rugby.

A Canadian Rugby Football Union was established in 1884, although this organisation went on to become the Canadian Football League, as rugby football in Canada evolved into Canadian football. In 1902–1903 the first Canadian team toured the United Kingdom, winning seven on 21 matches. In 1909, Earl Grey, then Governor General of Canada, donated a trophy to the CRU to be awarded for the Rugby Football Championship of Canada. This trophy became known as the Grey Cup. However, the rules used in Canada were vastly different from the rules used in countries that were part of the IRB. In the years that followed, the CRU would legalise forward passing and make other changes that would make Canadian football a totally different sport, similar to American football.

=== Post-World War I ===
The original Canadian Rugby Union disbanded just before World War I. During World War I and World War II rugby union was suspended, but during the inter-war period a renaissance occurred. In 1919 a Canadian Services team played overseas against representatives from England, New Zealand, South Africa and Australia. The formation of the Rugby Union of Canada in 1929 was followed by a Canadian representative side tour of Japan in 1932. About half the team were Canadian born (mostly British Columbia players) and the rest were originally from Britain. They beat Waseda University 29–13, but lost 9–8 and 38–5 in the two test matches.

Canada's tour team which travelled to the United Kingdom in 1962 was dominated by British Columbia players. They recorded a 3–3 draw with Barbarians F.C. and lost 8–0 to a Wales under-23 side. The 1966 British Lions won a non-cap match 19–8 in Toronto on their way back from Australia and New Zealand. The Rugby Union of Canada was reformed in 1974 as the Canadian Rugby Union. Canada established themselves as the strongest team in North America, though they struggled to compete with the major test-playing nations in Europe and the Southern Hemisphere. Wales won a non-cap game against Canada 56-10 in Cardiff in 1971, and another 58-20 in Toronto in 1973.

=== Start of the Professional era ===
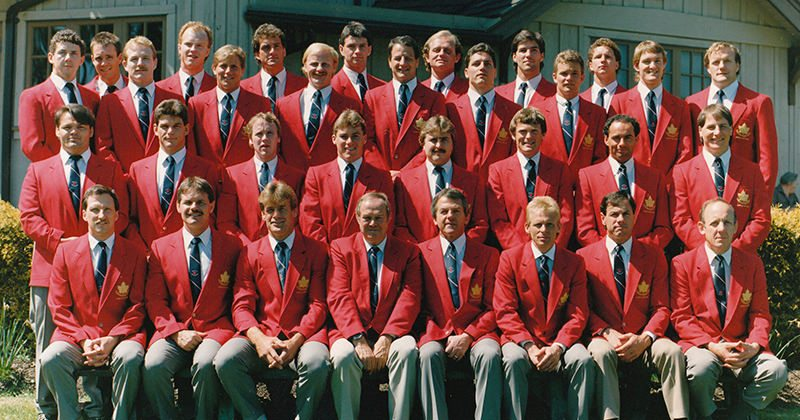
Canada National Rugby Squad, 1987 World Cup

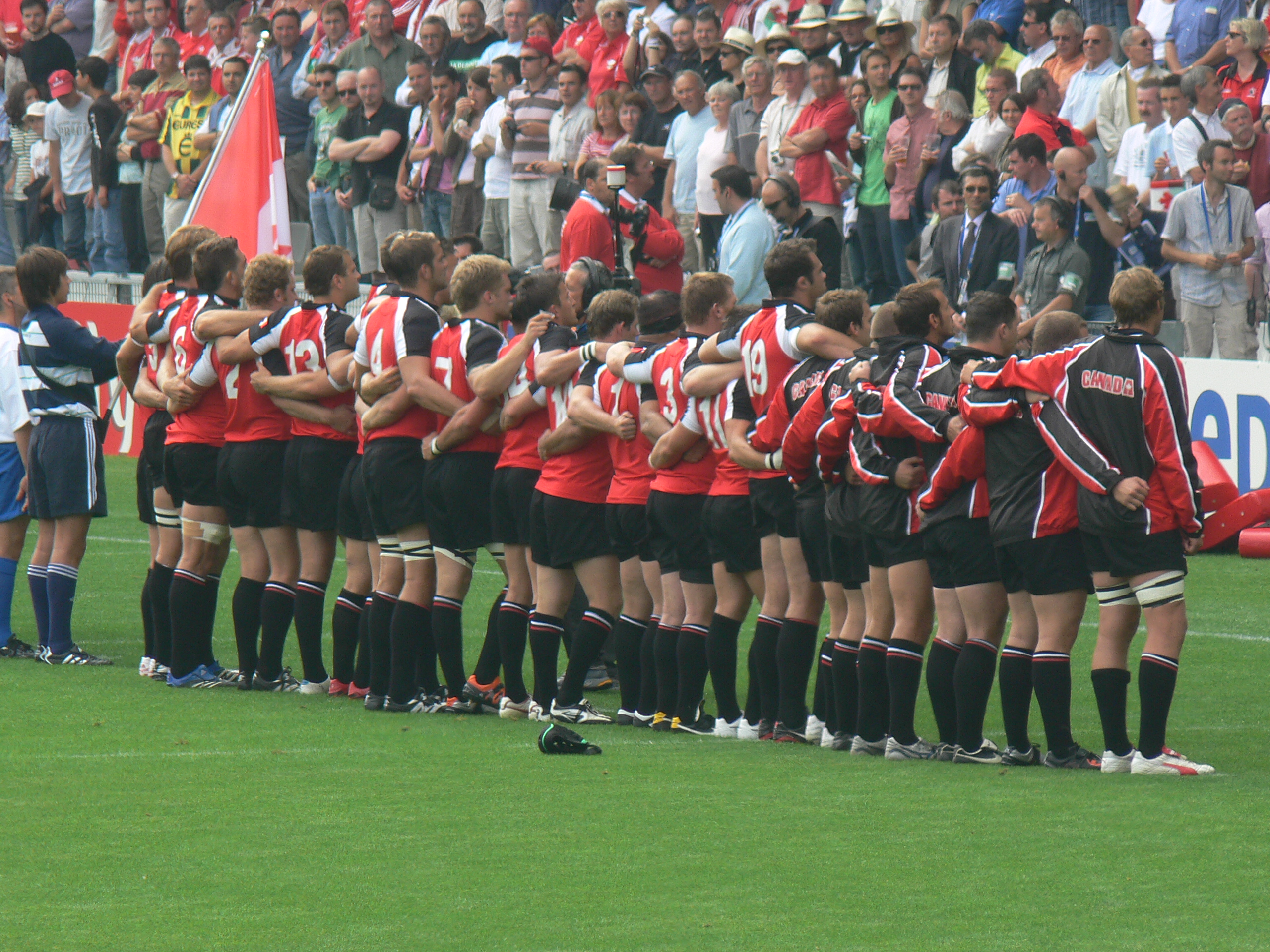
Canadian rugby team

Canada were one of the 16 nations that were invited by the International Rugby Board (IRB) to compete at the inaugural Rugby World Cup in 1987, hosted by both Australia and New Zealand. Canada were grouped with Wales, Ireland and Tonga in Pool 2. In their first ever World Cup match they defeated Tonga 37–4. However, they lost their subsequent matches 46–19 to Ireland and 40–9 to Wales finishing third in the pool.

Canada had to qualify for the 1991 Rugby World Cup. Canada took part in the Americas tournaments, and finished first in the Americas qualifying standings. Additionally, Canada beat Scotland XV 24–19 on May 25, 1991, at Saint John. At the 1991 Rugby World Cup, Canada was placed into Pool D, alongside France, Romania and Fiji. Canada beat Fiji and Romania in their opening two matches. Despite losing their final group fixture against France 19–13, Canada finished second in the pool and advanced to the quarter-finals. They were then knocked out in the quarter-final by the All Blacks, 29–13. The 1991 tournament stands as Canada's best ever finish in a Rugby World Cup. 23 of the 26 World Cup squad members were born in or played their club rugby in British Columbia.

Having reached the quarter-finals in 1991, Canada automatically qualified for the 1995 Rugby World Cup. They were in Pool A with the hosts South Africa, defending champions Australia, and Romania. Canada finished third in the pool, winning their match against Romania, but losing 27–11 to Australia and 20–0 to the Springboks.

Despite failing to replicate their previous success, Canada would build upon their 1991 World Cup achievement and record wins over tier 1 nations. Canada beat Wales 26–24 on November 10, 1993, at Cardiff Arms Park. They beat France 18–16 on June 4, 1994, at Twin Elms Rugby Park in Nepean, Ontario. They battled to a 27–27 draw against Ireland on 27 June 2000 in Markham, Ontario and chalked up a 26–23 win against Scotland in Vancouver, on June 15, 2002.

Canada has yet to beat England in seven attempts. They have also played the England national XV, B team, and Under 23 teams eleven times (for which Canada awarded its players international caps.) The most notable result was a 15–12 victory over a strong England XV on 29 May 1993 at Swangard Stadium in Burnaby. Unfortunately for the Canadians, on the eve of the match England's management chose not to award international caps, as some players were touring with the British and Irish Lions at the time.

Canada won the now defunct Pacific Rim Rugby Championship three years in succession in 1996, 1997 and 1998.

Canada finished second in Round 4 of the Americas 1999 Rugby World Cup qualifying, losing only to Argentina, and qualified for the World Cup. Canada finished third in their pool (with France, Fiji and Namibia), winning their match against Namibia but losing their other two fixtures. The victory against Namibia was uncharacteristic for Canada, as they ran the score up to 72–11, one of their most lopsided victories. This thrashing was the one bright light in an otherwise disappointing 1999 World Cup performance.

Like many second and third-tier nations, the Canadians have not always had their full complement of players available for test matches. Nevertheless, Canada has produced top class players such as Gareth Rees, Winston Stanley, Al Charron, Glenn Ennis, Gord MacKinnon, John Tait, Norm Hadley, Bobby Ross, Dan Baugh, Rod Snow, Mike James, Colin Yukes, Dave Lougheed and Jamie Cudmore who have played professionally in England, Wales and France.

Canada qualified for the 2003 Rugby World Cup as Americas 1, finishing at the top of Round 4 Americas tournaments, winning five of their six fixtures to enter the 2003 World Cup in Australia, their fifth world cup in a row. Canada's sole win was a 24–7 result against Tonga as they lost their games against Italy, Wales and the All Blacks.

From 2003 to 2011 Canada played host to the Churchill Cup and made one finals appearance in 2010, losing to the England Saxons 38–18. In 2004 and 2005 they competed in the Super Powers Cup. In 2005 the competition was renamed the Super Cup and Canada beat Japan 15–10 in the final.

=== 2007 World Cup Cycle ===
In 2006 Canada completed the qualification process for the 2007 Rugby World Cup. They were in a three-team group also containing Barbados and the United States. Each played the other once. On 24 June 2006, Canada defeated Barbados 71–3, in Bridgetown, their largest ever win. Canada achieved a record win over the US in the match in Newfoundland on August 12, 2006, defeating the United States 56–7 in front of a capacity crowd, when player James Pritchard scored a national record 36 points with three tries, six conversions and three penalties in the match, beating the record of 29 he had set against Barbados in their previous match. The win assured Canada of a place in the 2007 World Cup as Americas 2 in Pool B. Also that year, a Canadian team won the NA4 and the national team beat the US earlier in the Churchill Cup.

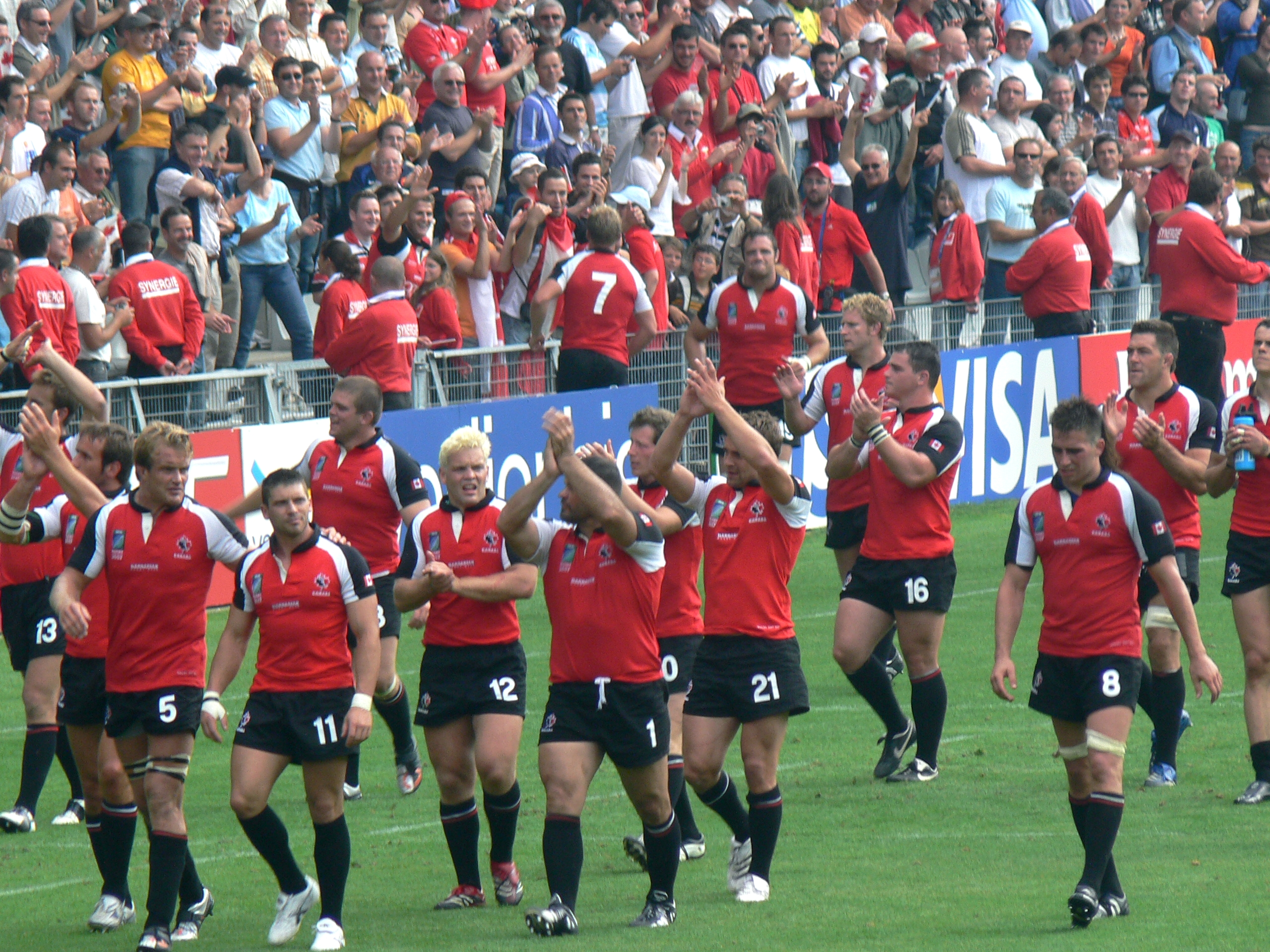
Canadian team after a pool stage match during the 2007 World Cup

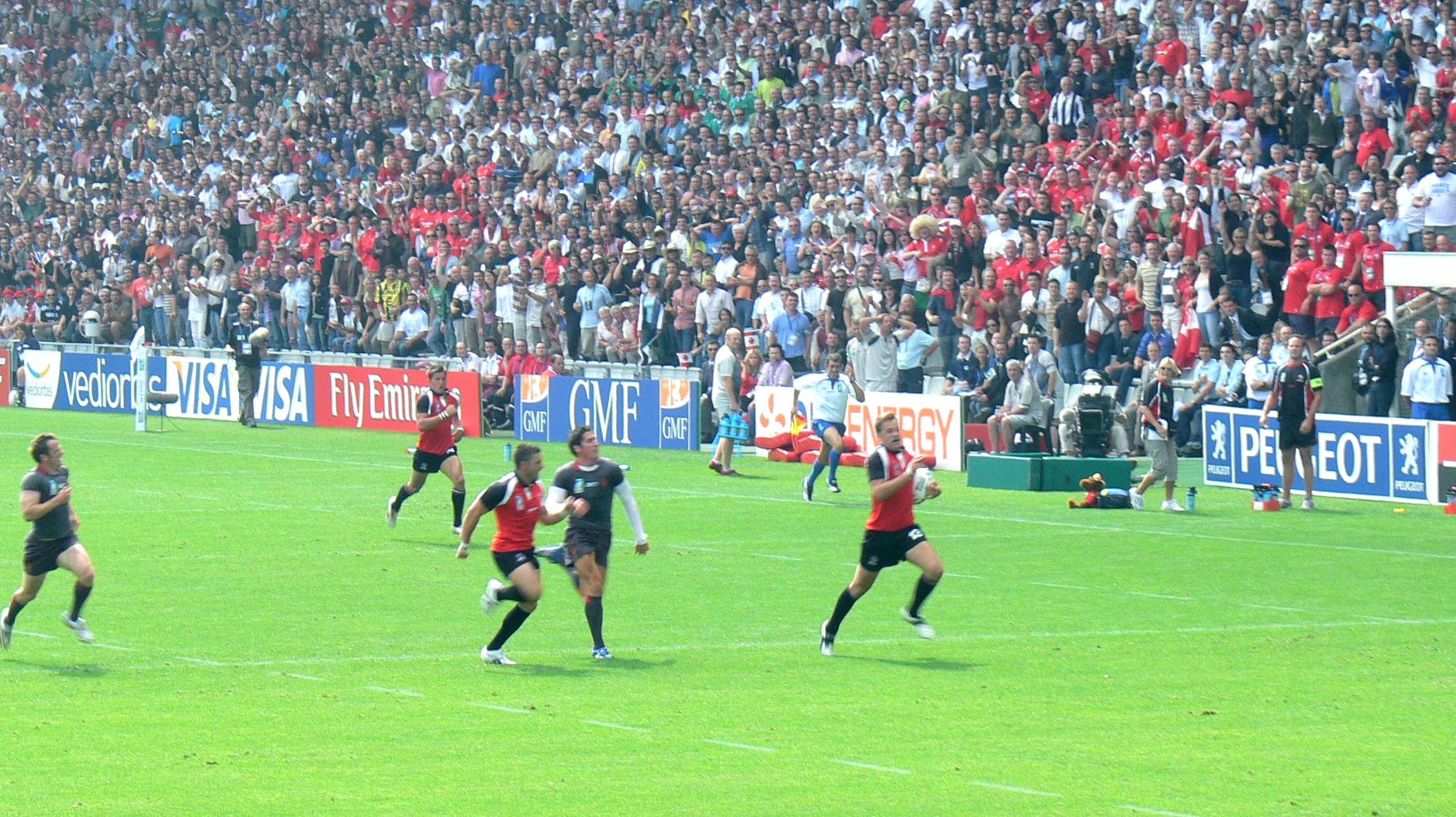
Canada take on Wales during the 2007 World Cup

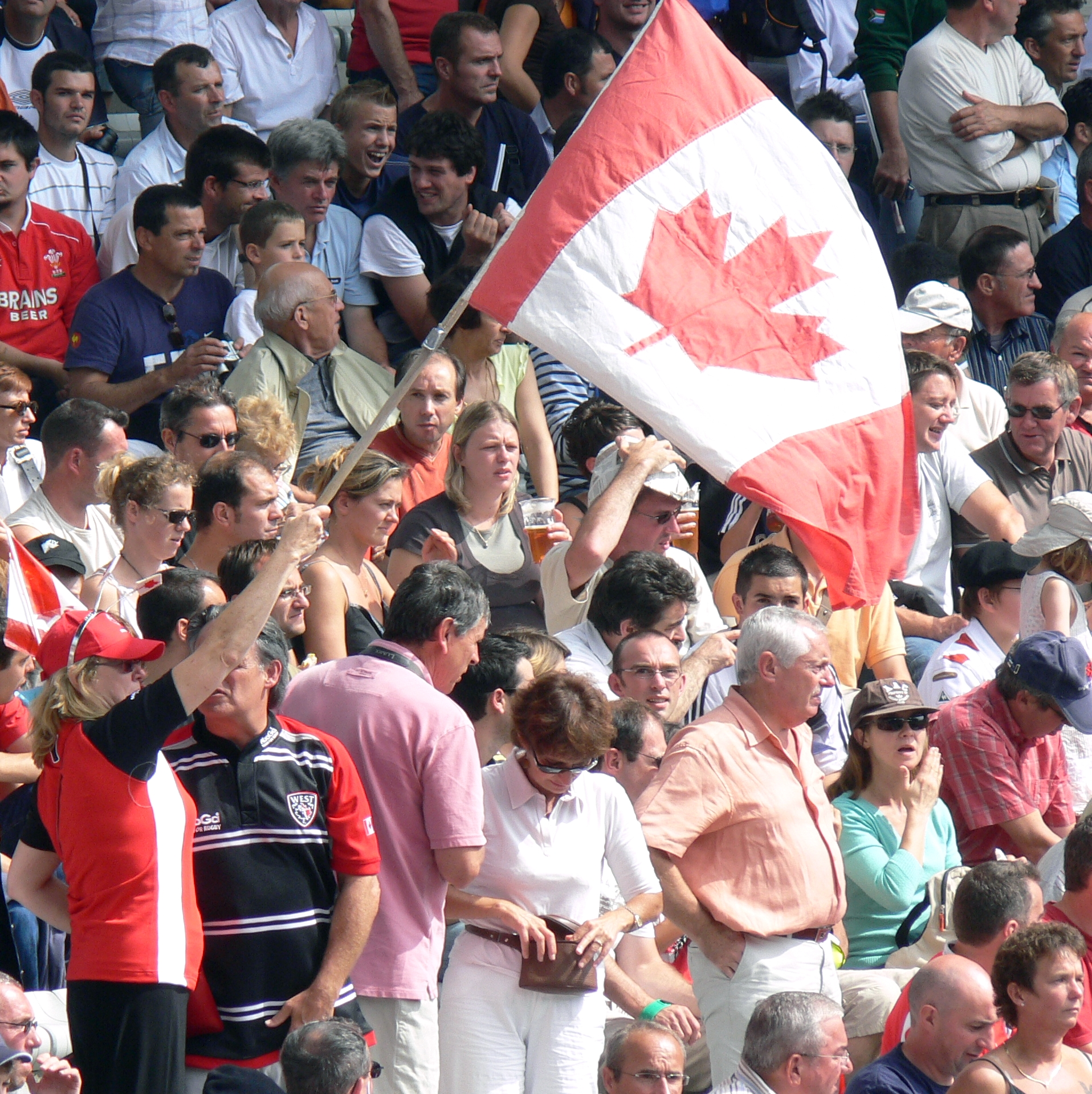
Canadian fans at the 2007 World Cup

Going into the 2007 Rugby World Cup in France, Canada were ranked as severe outsiders, and given odds of 5000/1 to win the tournament. Pool B also contained Australia, Fiji, Japan and Wales. In their opening match on 9 September the Canadians lost 42–17 to Wales. They followed this with a 29–16 loss to Fiji, whom they had needed to beat to have realistic hopes of progressing to the quarterfinals. They drew 12–12 with Japan, conceding an injury-time try by Koji Taira. In their final game they lost 37–6 to an Australian side consisting mostly of second-string players. Canada finished bottom of Pool B, and returned home from a World Cup without winning a single game for the first time ever.

=== 2011 World Cup cycle ===
Following the 2007 Rugby World Cup Canada hired Kieran Crowley as head coach, and by April 2008 the former New Zealand All Black took over coaching duties. In Autumn 2008 the Canadians toured Europe, beating Portugal in their opening match, but suffering heavy defeats in their subsequent games in Ireland, Wales and Scotland. In June 2009 the Canadians hosted the Welsh and Irish during the Summer test window, losing both encounters.

Canada beat the United States in a two-legged playoff game in July 2009 to qualify for the 2011 Rugby World Cup in New Zealand and enter the tournament as Americas 1.

Canada began its Rugby World Cup preparations by finishing runner-up in the 2011 Churchill Cup for the second year in a row, losing 37–6 in the final to the England Saxons (England's second-string side). This good form carried on in a two-legged home and away series against the USA Eagles. In the home leg Canada secured a 28–22 victory in front a record 10,621 fans. In the away leg Canada won 27–7. Their warm-up schedule continued with a match against the Australian Barbarians which featured several of Australia's World Cup squad, and the Barbarians claimed a comfortable 38–14 victory.

The Canadians began their 2011 Rugby World Cup on September 14 against Tonga, winning 25–20. They followed this up with a 46–19 loss to France on September 18. The team had only a four-day turn-around after their first match, and let the game slip out of their reach within the final 20 minutes. They produced a repeat result of 2007, by playing to a 23–23 draw against Japan. Their Rugby World Cup concluded with a 79–15 loss against the All Blacks. Canada finished fourth in their pool, narrowly missing out on automatic qualification for the 2015 Rugby World Cup.

=== 2015 World Cup cycle ===
Canada secured a spot in the 2015 Rugby World Cup on 23 August 2013, with a 13–11 win over the United States, 40–20 on aggregate. Canada joined Pool D with France, Ireland, Italy and Romania. Canada finished the tournament with zero wins and in last place in Pool D.

=== 2019 World Cup cycle ===
At the 2016 Americas Rugby Championship, Canada claimed three wins over Uruguay, Chile and Brazil, and two losses versus Argentina XV and United States. In June 2016, the team defeated Russia and lost to Japan and Italy. In November 2016, Canada was defeated by Ireland, Romania and Samoa.

At the 2017 Americas Rugby Championship, Canada scored a single win versus Chile, and lost the other four matches. In June 2017, the team lost to Georgia and Romania. Later they faced United States for the 2019 World Cup North America play-off, being beaten on aggregate for the first time. In November 2017, Canada lost to the Māori All Blacks, Georgia and Fiji, while defeating Spain.

In 2018, Canada lost both matches versus Uruguay for the 2019 World Cup Americas play-off, therefore the team advanced to the intercontinental repechage which it won, securing the very last spot in the final tournament. The team also lost to United States in the 2018 Americas Rugby Championship.

Canada secured the last spot in the 2019 Rugby World Cup on 23 November 2018, winning all of its three matches of the intercontinental repechage in Marseille, France.

They joined 2019 Rugby World Cup Pool B with title holders New Zealand and third-placed team from 2015 South Africa, Italy and the African qualifier, Namibia. They lost their first 3 fixtures by scores of 48–7 to Italy, 63–0 to New Zealand, and 66–7 to South Africa. Their last fixture against Namibia was cancelled due to Typhoon Hagibis.

=== 2023 World Cup Cycle and failure to qualify ===
Due to the COVID-19 pandemic, the Americas qualifying round was delayed indefinitely before it was abridged and the first fixtures were confirmed for July 2021. Canada played the United States in a two-game series; Canada won in thumping fashion in St. John's, winning by a score of 34–21. However, they scuttled in the return leg in Glendale, Colorado, losing by a score of 38–16, with the Americans dominating the game from start to finish. Canada lost the aggregate 50–59 and were drawn to play Chile in a two-game series for the second Americas spot. While Canada once again won the first leg, they only did so by a score of 22–21. Canada would lose the second leg in Santiago by a score of 33–24 (their first ever loss to Chile), which eliminated Canada from qualifying, marking the first time ever that Canada failed to qualify for the Rugby World Cup.

== Kits ==
=== Kit suppliers ===
Since 2021, their current kit provider is Macron.

Period	Kit manufacturer
2014–2018	Under Armour
2019–2020	Canterbury
2021–	Macron

== Stadium and attendance ==
The national team currently does not have a permanent home stadium and as such play their matches at various locations across Canada. BMO Field in Toronto, Ontario has been proposed as the national team's home stadium, despite not providing a suitable rugby climate year-round.

In August 2011 it was announced that the national team would have a permanent training centre located in Langford, British Columbia. The centre opened in 2017 and was named the Al Charron Rugby Canada National Training Centre.

Matches in Canada involving the Canadian national team with attendance of 10,000 or more:

Rank	Attendance	Opponent	Date	Venue	Location	Ref.
1	29,480	Māori All Blacks	2017-11-03	BC Place	Vancouver	
2	22,566	Māori All Blacks	2013-11-03	BMO Field	Toronto	
3	20,396	Ireland	2013-06-15	BMO Field	Toronto	
4	18,788	Scotland	2014-06-14	BMO Field	Toronto	
5	16,132	Uruguay	2018-01-27	BC Place	Vancouver	
6	15,000	United States	2005-06-26	Commonwealth Stadium	Edmonton	
7	13,187	United States	2017-06-24	Tim Hortons Field	Hamilton	
8	13,125	Italy	2016-06-26	BMO Field	Toronto	
9	12,824	Scotland	2018-06-09	Commonwealth Stadium	Edmonton	
10	12,220	Italy	2012-06-15	BMO Field	Toronto	
11	11,587	United States	2025-08-22	McMahon Stadium	Calgary	
12	11,477	Scotland	2024-07-06	TD Place	Ottawa	
13	11,200	Samoa	2015-07-29	BMO Field	Toronto	
14	10,621	United States	2011-08-06	BMO Field	Toronto	
15	10,250	Japan	2016-06-11	BC Place	Vancouver	
16	10,207	United States	2013-08-24	BMO Field	Toronto	
17	10,000	New Zealand XV	1980-10-11	Swangard Stadium	Burnaby	

== Results and fixtures ==
=== Upcoming fixtures ===
Date	Tournament	Location	Venue	Opponent
4 October 2027	Rugby World Cup	Brisbane	Brisbane Stadium	Argentina
10 October 2027	Rugby World Cup	Adelaide	Adelaide Oval	Fiji
16 October 2027	Rugby World Cup	Townsville	North Queensland Stadium	Spain

=== Recent results ===
Below is a table of the last 10 fixtures.

Date	Tournament	Location	Venue	Opponent	Result	Score
20 November 2026	Nations Cup	Bucharest	Arcul de Triumf Stadium	Romania	Win	26–27
14 November 2026	Nations Cup	Chambéry, France	Chambéry Savoie Stadium	Hong Kong	Win	38–17
7 November 2026	Nations Cup	Tbilisi	Avchala Stadium	Georgia	Loss	59–14
19 September 2026	Pacific Nations Cup	Tokyo	Chichibunomiya Rugby Stadium	United States	Win	19–16
12 September 2026	Pacific Nations Cup	Higashiōsaka	Hanazono Rugby Stadium	Fiji	Loss	45–29
5 September 2026	Test match	Niigata	Denka Big Swan Stadium	Japan	Loss	57–12
18 July 2026	Nations Cup	Winnipeg	Princess Auto Stadium	Zimbabwe	Win	23–19
11 July 2026	Nations Cup	Edmonton	Clarke Stadium	Portugal	Loss	14–38
4 July 2026	Nations Cup	Edmonton	Clarke Stadium	Spain	Draw	42–42
22 November 2025	Canada tour of Europe	Coimbra	Estádio Cidade de Coimbra	Portugal	Loss	33–27

Green background indicates a win. Red background indicates a loss. Yellow background indicates a draw.

== Players ==
=== Current squad ===
On 26 October, Canada named a 36-player squad ahead of the 2026 World Rugby Nations Cup European-African-Asian Series.

Head coach: Steve Meehan

- Caps Updated: 14 November 2026 (after Hong Kong v Canada)

Note: Flags indicate national union for the club/province as defined by World Rugby.

Player	Position	Date of birth (age)	Caps	Club/province
Austin Creighton	Hooker	6 June 2000 (age 26)	6	(Brazil) Cobras Brasil Rugby
Foster DeWitt	Hooker	26 May 1996 (age 30)	9	(England) Nottingham
Dewald Kotze	Hooker	14 June 1997 (age 29)	19	(England) Rotherham Titans
Andrew Quattrin	Hooker	29 August 1996 (age 30)	32	(France) Carcassonne
Cole Keith	Prop	7 May 1997 (age 29)	48	(France) Périgueux
Cali Martinez	Prop	13 October 1996 (age 30)	17	(United States) Old Glory DC
Tyler Matchem	Prop	4 October 2003 (age 23)	3	(Canada) James Bay
Sam Miller	Prop	5 June 2002 (age 24)	12	(England) Blackheath
Kyle Steeves	Prop	31 January 2000 (age 26)	11	(England) Blackheath
Bryce Worden	Prop	18 July 1995 (age 31)	3	(Australia) West Harbour
Matt Beukeboom	Lock	3 April 1997 (age 29)	5	(France) Angoulême
Daragh Doyle	Lock	21 September 2005 (age 21)	7	(Ireland) Clontarf
Izzak Kelly	Lock	9 April 2000 (age 26)	21	(Portugal) Benfica
Evan Olmstead	Lock	21 February 1991 (age 35)	38	(France) Nice
Barnaby Waddell	Lock	19 December 2001 (age 24)	6	(England) Camborne
Tyler Ardron	Back row	16 June 1991 (age 35)	42	(France) Provence
Mason Flesch	Back row	18 November 1999 (age 27)	26	(England) Newcastle Red Bulls
Ethan Fryer	Back row	27 May 2002 (age 24)	7	(Uruguay) Peñarol
Matt Oworu	Back row	29 July 2000 (age 26)	18	(France) Biarritz
Siôn Parry	Back row	29 October 1998 (age 28)	23	(Wales) Ebbw Vale
Lucas Rumball	Back row	2 August 1995 (age 31)	71	(United States) Chicago Hounds
Jason Higgins	Scrum-half	28 March 1995 (age 31)	33	(Ireland) Cork Constitution
Jesse Kilgour	Scrum-half	17 December 2004 (age 21)	5	(Canada) Aurora Barbarians
Stephen Webb	Scrum-half	15 December 2005 (age 20)	3	(Canada) UBC Thunderbirds
Spencer Jones	Fly-half	17 July 1997 (age 29)	21	(England) Nottingham
Jack Gore	Fly-half	15 November 2007 (age 19)	2	(Canada) Laurier Golden Hawks
Jacob Ince	Centre	14 September 2002 (age 24)	6	(Ireland) Young Munster
Ben LeSage	Centre	24 November 1995 (age 30)	43	(United States) New England Free Jacks
Josh McIndoe	Centre	4 August 2005 (age 21)	2	(Canada) UVIC Vikes
Isaac Olson	Centre	1 July 2000 (age 26)	9	(England) Ampthill
Josh Thiel	Centre	2 June 1997 (age 29)	4	(Canada) James Bay
Liam James	Wing	21 September 2006 (age 20)	5	(Canada) UBC Old Boys Ravens
Nic Benn	Wing	28 April 2001 (age 25)	15	(New Zealand) Hawke's Bay
Demetri Patterson	Wing	30 October 2003 (age 23)	1	(Canada) Capilano
Kyle Tremblay	Wing	27 August 1999 (age 27)	9	(Canada) Westshore
Takoda McMullin	Fullback	1 May 2002 (age 24)	8	(Canada) Bayside Sharks
Mitch Voralek	Fullback	21 February 1997 (age 29)	0	(Canada) Waterloo County

== Coaches ==
=== Current coaching staff ===
Correct as of 29 August 2026

Position	Name
Head coach	(Australia) Steve Meehan
Forwards coach	(Australia) Anthony Mathison
Defence coach	(New Zealand) Callum Gibbins
Skills coach	(New Zealand) Aaron Frisby

=== Coaching history ===
- Jack Tyrwhitt (1932)
- Max Howell (1959)
- 'Buzz' Moore (1962)
- Ken Banks (1966)
- George Sainas (1967)
- Dick Ellis (1970)
- Max Howell (1971)
- George Carson (1973–1974)
- Donn Spence (1976–1978)
- Bruce Howe (1979–1982)
- Tillman Briggs (1983–1984)
- Barry Legh (1985)
- Gary Johnston (1985–1989)
- Ian Birtwell (1989–1996)
- Patrick Parfrey (1996–1999)
- David Clark (2000–2001)
- Ian Birtwell (2001) (Interim)
- David Clark (2001–2003)
- Ric Suggitt (2004–2007)
- Kieran Crowley (2008–2015)
- Francois Ratier (2016) (Interim)
- Mark Anscombe (2016–2017)
- Kingsley Jones (2017–2024)
- Steve Meehan (2024–)

== Individual records ==
=== Most caps ===
#	Player	Pos	Span	Mat	Start	Sub	Won	Lost	Draw	%
1	Aaron Carpenter	Number 8	2005–2017	80	61	19	28	48	3	38.12
2	Al Charron	Flanker	1990–2003	76	76	0	40	36	0	52.63
3	Ciaran Hearn	Centre	2008–2019	72	61	11	25	46	1	35.4
4	Lucas Rumball	Flanker	2016–	71	67	4	21	49	1	29.58
5	Djustice Sears-Duru	Prop	2013–2024	70	31	39	18	51	1	26.87
6	Winston Stanley	Wing	1994–2003	66	64	2	27	38	1	41.66
7	Scott Stewart	Fullback	1989–2001	64	62	2	29	34	1	46.09
8	Nick Blevins	Centre	2009–2019	63	47	16	22	40	1	35.71
9	James Pritchard	Fullback	2003–2015	62	58	4	26	34	2	43.54
9	Rod Snow	Prop	1995–2007	62	59	3	27	33	2	45.16

Last updated: Georgia vs Canada, 7 November 2026. Statistics include officially capped matches only.

=== Most tries ===
#	Player	Pos	Span	Mat	Start	Sub	Pts	Tries
1	D. T. H. van der Merwe	Wing	2006–2019	60	56	4	190	38
2	Winston Stanley	Wing	1994–2003	66	64	2	123	24
3	Taylor Paris	Wing	2010–2019	28	26	2	90	18
3	James Pritchard	Fullback	2003–2015	62	58	4	607	18
5	Aaron Carpenter	Number 8	2005–2017	80	61	19	85	17
6	Lucas Rumball	Flanker	2016–present	71	67	4	80	16
7	Morgan Williams	Scrum-half	1999–2008	56	52	4	68	13
8	Nick Blevins	Centre	2009-2019	63	47	16	60	12
8	Matt Evans	Fullback	2008–2018	40	34	6	60	12
10	Kainoa Lloyd	Wing	2017–present	25	21	4	50	10
10	Kyle Nichols	Centre	1996–2002	25	22	3	61	10

Last updated: Georgia vs Canada, 7 November 2026. Statistics include officially capped matches only.

=== Most points ===
#	Player	Pos	Span	Mat	Pts	Tries	Conv	Pens	Drop
1	James Pritchard	Fullback	2003–2015	62	607	18	104	103	0
2	Gareth Rees	Fly-half	1986–1999	55	491	7	51	110	9
3	Bobby Ross	Fly-half	1989–2003	58	419	7	51	84	10
4	Gordon McRorie	Scrum-half	2014–2019	45	283	6	44	54	1
5	Mark Wyatt	Fullback	1982–1991	29	255	2	23	62	5
6	Peter Nelson	Fullback	2019–	38	250	3	65	35	0
7	Jared Barker	Fly-half	2000–2004	18	226	2	24	55	1
8	D. T. H. van der Merwe	Wing	2006–2019	60	190	38	0	0	0
9	Winston Stanley	Wing	1994–2003	66	123	24	0	0	1
10	Taylor Paris	Wing	2010–2019	28	90	18	0	0	0

Last updated: Canada vs Zimbabwe, 18 July 2026. Statistics include officially capped matches only.
- Note, Gareth Rees points total is in dispute, some sources claim 487 while others including World Rugby claim 491.

=== Most matches as captain ===
#	Player	Pos	Span	Mat	Won	Lost	Draw	%	Pts	Tries
1	Lucas Rumball	Flanker	2016–	40	10	30	0	25.00	55	11
2	Al Charron	Flanker	1996–2003	25	13	12	0	52.00	10	2
2	Gareth Rees	Fly-half	1994–1999	25	10	15	0	40.00	285	4
4	Pat Riordan	Hooker	2008–2011	23	12	10	1	54.34	15	3
5	Tyler Ardron	Number 8	2013–2019	16	0	16	0	00.00	10	2
6	John Graf	Scrum-half	1995–1999	15	9	6	0	60.00	58	6
6	Morgan Williams	Scrum-half	2005–2007	15	5	9	1	36.66	25	5
8	Aaron Carpenter	Number 8	2012–2016	14	7	7	0	50.00	15	3
9	Phil Mack	Scrum-half	2017–2019	11	6	5	0	54.54	0	0
10	Mark Wyatt	Fullback	1990–1991	9	6	3	0	66.66	97	2

Last updated: Georgia vs Canada, 7 November 2026. Statistics include officially capped matches only.

=== Most points in a match ===
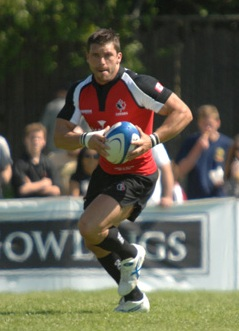
Australian born James Pritchard is Canada's second highest try scorer and points scorer of all time, he also holds the record for most points in a match with 36 against the USA in 2006.

#	Player	Pos	Pts	Tries	Conv	Pens	Drop	Opposition	Venue	Date
1	James Pritchard	Wing	36	3	6	3	0	United States	(Canada) St John's	12/08/2006
2	James Pritchard	Wing	29	3	7	0	0	Barbados	(Barbados) Bridgetown	24/06/2006
3	Gareth Rees	Fly-half	27	0	9	3	0	Namibia	(France) Toulouse	14/10/1999
3	James Pritchard	Fullback	27	2	4	3	0	Portugal	(Portugal) Lisbon	23/11/2013
5	Bobby Ross	Fly-half	26	1	3	5	0	Japan	(Canada) Vancouver	13/07/1996
5	Gordon McRorie	Scrum-half	26	2	5	2	0	Russia	(Canada) Calgary	18/06/2016
7	Mark Wyatt	Fullback	24	0	0	8	0	Scotland XV	(Canada) Saint John	25/05/1991
8	Gareth Rees	Fly-half	23	0	1	7	0	Argentina	(Argentina) Buenos Aires	22/08/1998
8	James Pritchard	Fullback	23	1	3	4	0	Tonga	(Canada) Kingston	08/06/2013
10	5 players on 22 points									

Last updated: Canada vs United States, 22 August 2025. Statistics include officially capped matches only.

=== Most tries in a match ===
#	Player	Pos	Pts	Tries	Conv	Pens	Drop	Opposition	Venue	Date
1	Kyle Nichols	Centre	20	4	0	0	0	Japan	(Canada) Markham	15/07/2000
1	Tyler Ardron	Number 8	20	4	0	0	0	United States	(Canada) Calgary	22/08/2025
2	Steve Gray	Centre	15	3	0	0	0	United States	(Canada) Vancouver	10/05/1987
2	James Pritchard	Wing	29	3	7	0	0	Barbados	(Barbados) Bridgetown	24/06/2006
2	James Pritchard	Wing	36	3	6	3	0	United States	(Canada) St John's	12/08/2006
2	Taylor Paris	Wing	15	3	0	0	0	Chile	(Canada) Langford	11/02/2017
2	D. T. H. van der Merwe	Wing	15	3	0	0	0	Kenya	(France) Marseille	11/11/2018
2	Kainoa Lloyd	Wing	15	3	0	0	0	Chile	(Canada) Langford	22/02/2019
2	Lucas Rumball	Flanker	15	3	0	0	0	Brazil	(Spain) El Pantano, Villajoyosa	18/11/2023

Last updated: Canada vs United States, 22 August 2025. Statistics include officially capped matches only.

== Competitive record ==
=== World Cup ===
Canada has played in every Rugby World Cup since the inaugural 1987 tournament, and up to 2015, have always qualified during the first round. However, for the 2019, they have failed to qualify during the first two rounds, but to qualified by means of the 4-team repechage in November 2018.

Rugby World Cup record									Qualification						
Year	Round	Pld	W	D	L	PF	PA	Squad	Pos	Pld	W	D	L	PF	PA
(New Zealand) (Australia) 1987	Pool stage	3	1	0	2	65	90	Squad	Invited						
(England) (France) (Ireland) (Scotland) (Wales) 1991	Quarter-finals	4	2	0	2	58	62	Squad	1st	4	3	0	1	67	38
(South Africa) 1995	Pool stage	3	1	0	2	45	50	Squad	Automatically qualified						
(Wales) 1999	Pool stage	3	1	0	2	114	82	Squad	2nd	3	2	0	1	97	83
(Australia) 2003	Pool stage	4	1	0	3	54	135	Squad	1st	6	5	0	1	192	80
(France) 2007	Pool stage	4	0	1	3	51	120	Squad	1st	2	2	0	0	125	10
(New Zealand) 2011	Pool stage	4	1	1	2	82	168	Squad	P/O	2	1	0	1	47	30
(England) 2015	Pool stage	4	0	0	4	58	131	Squad	P/O	2	2	0	0	40	20
(Japan) 2019	Pool stage	4	0	1	3	14	177	Squad	P/O	7	3	1	3	225	89
(France) 2023	Did not qualify								P/O	4	2	0	2	96	113
(Australia) 2027	Qualified								2nd	4	1	0	3	49	77
(United States) 2031	To be determined								To be determined						
Total	—	33	7	3	23	541	1015	—	—	34	21	1	12	938	640
Champions; Runners–up; Third place; Fourth place; Home venue

During Typhoon Hagibis; Namibia v Canada was to be cancelled and recorded as 0–0 draw

=== Pacific Nations Cup ===
Year	Finish	Played	Won	Drawn	Lost	Points For	Points Against	Points Diff	Tries For	Tries Against	Try Bonus	Losing Bonus	Points
2013	2nd	4	3	0	1	85	70	+15	8	7	0	1	13
2014	3rd	2	0	0	2	60	72	–12	8	7	1	1	2
2015	6th	4	0	0	4	57	84	–27	5	6	0	2	2
2019	6th	3	0	0	3	55	118	−63	8	17	1	0	1
2024	6th	3	0	0	3	60	113	−53	8	16	1	0	1
2025	4th	4	1	0	3	83	175	–92	11	24	1	0	5
2026	3rd	2	1	0	1	48	61	–13	7	8	1	0	5
Total	—N/a	22	5	0	17	448	693	–245	55	85	5	4	29

== Overall ==
Men's World Rugby Rankings Top 30 as of 16 November 2026
Rank	Change (Note: Change from the previous week)	Team	Points
1	Steady	South Africa	91.53
2	Steady	New Zealand	90.65
3	▲1	France	89.05
4	▼1	Ireland	88.70
5	Steady	England	86.99
6	Steady	Scotland	85.28
7	Steady	Australia	82.24
8	Steady	Argentina	82.09
9	▲1	Wales	79.37
10	▼1	Fiji	77.79
11	Steady	Italy	75.84
12	Steady	Japan	75.25
13	Steady	Georgia	74.23
14	▲1	United States	68.39
15	▼1	Portugal	68.24
16	▲3	Samoa	67.60
17	▲1	Chile	67.00
18	▼2	Spain	66.53
19	▼2	Tonga	65.58
20	Steady	Uruguay	65.17
21	Steady	Canada	63.38
22	Steady	Belgium	62.00
23	Steady	Romania	61.13
24	Steady	Hong Kong	58.46
25	Steady	Zimbabwe	57.71
26	Steady	Netherlands	56.44
27	Steady	Namibia	56.03
28	Steady	Switzerland	55.47
29	Steady	Czech Republic	55.42
30	Steady	Poland	54.54

Canada's historical rankings

Source: World Rugby
Graph updated to 16 November 2026

=== Head-to-head record ===
Below is a table of the representative rugby matches played by a Canada national XV at test level up until 20 November 2026.

Opponent	Played	Won	Lost	Drawn	Win %	For	Aga	Diff
Argentina	9	3	6	0	33.33%	159	277	–118
Australia	6	0	6	0	0%	60	283	–223
Barbados	1	1	0	0	100%	69	3	+66
Barbarians	2	0	1	1	0%	7	32	–25
Belgium	4	3	1	0	75%	130	37	+93
Brazil	5	3	2	0	60%	170	87	+83
British & Irish Lions	1	0	1	0	0%	8	19	–11
Chile	9	7	2	0	77.78%	305	160	+145
England	9	1	8	0	11.11%	87	343	–256
England XV	4	0	4	0	16.67%	40	159	–119
England U23	2	0	2	0	0%	22	55	–33
England A	3	0	3	0	0%	41	132	–91
Fiji	14	3	11	0	21.43%	260	517	–257
France	9	1	8	0	11.11%	119	315	–196
French Barbarians	1	0	1	0	0%	7	17	–10
France A	3	1	2	0	33.33%	57	85	–28
Georgia	9	3	6	0	33.33%	172	242	-70
Germany	1	1	0	0	100%	29	10	+19
Hong Kong	8	7	1	0	87.5%	247	126	+121
Ireland	8	0	7	1	0%	105	328	–223
Ireland XV	1	0	1	0	0%	21	24	–3
Italy	10	2	8	0	20%	135	294	–159
Japan	28	8	18	2	28.57%	636	781	–145
Kenya	1	1	0	0	100%	65	19	+46
Namibia	3	2	1	0	66.67%	126	67	+59
Netherlands	1	1	0	0	100%	37	25	+12
New Zealand	6	0	6	0	0%	54	376	–322
New Zealand XV	1	0	1	0	0%	10	43	–33
Māori All Blacks	2	0	2	0	0%	36	95	–59
Portugal	7	4	3	0	57.14%	196	144	+52
Romania	12	4	8	0	33.33%	252	252	0
Russia	5	4	1	0	80%	157	91	+66
Samoa	6	0	6	0	0%	103	169	–66
Scotland	6	1	5	0	16.67%	71	226	–155
Scotland A	3	1	2	0	33.33%	44	63	–19
South Africa	3	0	3	0	0%	25	137	–112
Spain	6	2	3	1	33.33%	216	214	+2
Tonga	13	6	7	0	46.15%	295	303	–8
United States	68	41	25	2	60.29%	1,566	1,262	+304
Uruguay	13	8	5	0	61.54%	370	232	+138
Wales	13	1	12	0	7.69%	219	528	–309
Wales XV	3	0	3	0	0%	37	138	–101
Wales U23	1	0	1	0	0%	0	8	–8
Zimbabwe	1	1	0	0	100%	23	19	+4
Total	321	121	193	7	37.69%	6,790	8,737	–1,947

=== Wins against Tier 1 nations ===
The following is a list of Canada's wins against Tier 1 countries:

25 June 1983	Canada	19–13	Italy	Sports Complex, Burnaby Lake
	Try: Donaldson; Pen: MacLean, Wyatt (4)	Report	Try: Ghizzoni; Pen: Torresan (2); Drop: Torresan	Referee: I. Nixon (Canada)

30 March 1990	Canada	15–6	Argentina	Sports Complex, Burnaby Lake
	Try: Palmer; Con: Wyatt; Pen: Wyatt (3)	Report	Pen: Vidou (2)	Attendance: 4,000; Referee: Kerry Fitzgerald (Australia)

16 June 1990	Argentina	15–19	Canada	José Amalfitani Stadium, Buenos Aires
	Try: Bundaer (2); Garzón; Pen: Mesón	Report	Try: Stuart; Pen: Rees (4); Drop: Rees	Referee: Dave Bishop (New Zealand)

25 May 1991	Canada	24–19	Scotland XV	Saint John, New Brunswick

29 May 1993	Canada	15–12	England	Swangard Stadium, Burnaby, BC

10 November 1993	Wales	24–26	Canada	Cardiff Arms Park
	Pen: N Jenkins (8)	Report	Try: Charron; Stuart; Con: Rees (2); Pen: Rees (4)	Attendance: 27,000; Referee: Owen Doyle (Ireland)

4 June 1994	Canada	18–16	France	Twin Elm Rugby Park, Nepean
	Pen: Rees (6)	Report	Try: Ntamack; Con: Lacroix; Pen: Lacroix (3)	Attendance: 6,000; Referee: Ian Rogers (South Africa)

11 November 2000	Italy	17–22	Canada	Stadio Comunale Mario Battaglini, Rovigo
	Try: M. Dallan; Pen: Mazzariol (3); Pez	Report	Try: Wirachowski; Con: Barker; Pen: Barker (4); Drop: Barker	Attendance: 4,000; Referee: Didier Mene (France)

15 June 2002	Canada	26–23	Scotland	Vancouver, BC
		Report		Referee: D McHugh (Ireland)

Canada also achieved a 27–27 draw against Ireland on 27 June 2000 at Markham, Ontario.

== See also ==
- List of Canada national rugby union team test matches
- List of Canada national rugby union players
- Rugby union in Canada
- Rugby Canada
- Canadian Rugby Championship
- Canada national rugby sevens team
- Canadian football
