= Gareth Rees (rugby union) =

Canada international rugby union player

- Born: Gareth Lloyd Rees; 30 June 1967 (age 59) Duncan, British Columbia, Canada
- Height: 6 ft 0 in (1.83 m)
- Weight: 204 lb (93 kg)

Rugby union career
- Position: Fly-half / Fullback
Amateur team(s)
Years	Team	Apps	(Points)
- Castaway Wanderers RFC
Senior career
Years	Team	Apps	(Points)
- Bedford Blues
1993–1996	Newport	47	(603)
- Mérignac
1997–1999	Wasps	29	(280)
1999–2000	Harlequins	13	(72)
International career
Years	Team	Apps	(Points)
1986–1999	Canada	55	(487)

Gareth Lloyd Rees (born 30 June 1967) is a Canadian former international rugby union footballer who played at fly-half and full back positions. Rees played for several English club sides, including Wasps and Harlequins. He won 55 caps for Canada, captaining them on 23 occasions and scoring 487 test points. In October 2011, Rees received arguably his greatest honour with induction to the IRB Hall of Fame. He and fellow 2011 inductee Brian Lima of Samoa are the first members of the IRB Hall from nations outside of the traditional top tier of the sport.

== Rugby career ==
Rees was born in Duncan, British Columbia, to Alan Rees who had emigrated to Canada from Wales, and was himself a former rugby union footballer having represented Cross Keys, Maesteg and London Welsh. Rees was educated at St. Michaels University School in Victoria and later at Harrow School in England. When studying at Harrow, he was selected for the Wasps starting XV in what was then the John Player Cup final in 1986.

He played club rugby with Castaways, Wasps, Mérignac, Newport, Oxford University, Harlequins, and the Barbarians. Whilst at Wasps, he helped them win the Anglo-Welsh Cup in 1999, 13 years after his last appearance in the final, scoring two conversions and four penalties as they defeated Newcastle Falcons.

Rees played in all of the first four Rugby World Cup tournaments, the 1987, 1991, 1995 and 1999. He retired after the 1999 finals becoming the only player to play at the first four Rugby World Cups.

In the 1995 World Cup, Rees, James Dalton and Rod Snow were sent off for fighting in a Canada vs South Africa match that came to be known as the Battle of Boet Erasmus. All three players received a 30-day suspension. Rees did not regret coming to the aid of his team mates, and said after the incident, "We're a very tight team. The guys love each other."

He was inducted in the British Columbia Rugby Hall of Fame.

In 2011, he was inducted in the World Rugby Hall of Fame as the first and only Canadian. In 2014, he was inducted in the Canada Sports Hall of Fame as the first and only rugby player.

Rees donated one of his rugby boots to be bronzed and used as a trophy to be competed for annually by St. Michaels and Oak Bay High School.
