= Mark Wyatt (rugby union, born 1961) =

Canada international rugby union player

- Born: Mark Andrew Wyatt; 12 April 1961 (age 65) Hamilton, Bermuda

Rugby union career
- Position(s): Fullback, Fly-half
Senior career
Years	Team	Apps	(Points)
- Victoria High School
–	Oak Bay High School		
–	James Bay Athletic Association		
–	University of Victoria		
–	Velox Valhallians		
–	Barbarians		
International career
Years	Team	Apps	(Points)
1982-1991	Canada	29	(227)

Mark Andrew Wyatt (born 12 April 1961 in Hamilton, Bermuda) is a Bermudian-born Canadian former rugby union footballer. He played as a fullback and sometimes as a fly-half.

== Career ==
Wyatt is remembered as one of the best Canadian rugby players of his generation and of all time, and for his kicking skills which made him one of the most prolific scorers ever for Canada. He also played for the British invitational team Barbarian F.C., played against the North of England for the World XV in 1989, and played in the Australian Bi-Centennial for the World XV in Sydney, 1988.

His parents settled in British Columbia, one of the provinces of Canada where rugby is more popular and where he would make his player career. He played for the Victoria High School Titans (rugby) and Tyees (soccer) and was first noticed in 1980. He then went to play for James Bay Athletic Association, for a year. He then played for the University of Victoria, Velox Valhallians and the Vancouver Island Crimson Tide.

Wyatt had 29 caps for Canada, from 1982 to 1991, scoring 1 try, 23 conversions, 55 penalties and 5 drop goals, for an aggregate of 227 points. As a 20-year old his first test match for the "Canucks" came on 11 April 1982, in a 24–18 loss to Japan, in Osaka. He scored two conversions and two penalties.

Wyatt played twice at the Rugby World Cup finals. He played all the three matches at the 1987 Rugby World Cup finals, scoring 2 conversions in the 37–4 win over Tonga. In the 19–46 loss to Ireland, he also scored a penalty. Canada final loss of 9–40 to Wales meant that Canada did not pass the first round. Wyatt scored 2 conversions and one penalty during the tournament, for an aggregate of 7 points.

Wyatt remained a regular and a top scorer in the Canada side, being promoted to captain in 1990. He achieved an historical feat at 25 May 1991, in a 24–19 win over Scotland XV, in Saint John, scoring all the 8 penalties that gave Canada a memorable win. This world record was even stated at the 1993 edition of the Guinness Book of Records, and held for 10 years.

Wyatt, the same year, had his second and final presence at the major international rugby union competition, the 1991 Rugby World Cup finals, this time as the captain. Due to injury he was absent from the first game, where Fiji was defeated by 13–3. He played in the 19–11 win over Romania, scoring 1 conversion and 2 penalties, in the 19-13 narrow loss to France, scoring a try and a penalty, and finally in the quarter-finals historical first presence of Canada. 20 October 1991 saw a heated game with the much favoured New Zealand, in Lille, ending in a close defeat of 13–29. Wyatt once again scored a penalty. He had scored at the competition, 1 try, 1 conversion and 4 penalties, for an aggregate of 17 points. His total at the Rugby World Cup finals was 1 try, 3 conversions and 5 penalties, for an aggregate of 24 points.

In addition to the full game, he played 7-a-side for Canada between 1983–1991 at the Hong Kong Sevens, Sydney Sevens, and Glasgow.

Wyatt left the National Team after the competition, aged only 30 years old.
