= Patrick Palmer (rugby union) =

Welsh rugby union player (born 1988)

- Born: 19 January 1988 (age 38)

Rugby union career
- Position: Prop forward
- Current team: Pontypridd RFC
Youth career
- Cardiff RFC
- –: Pontypridd RFC
- –: Cardiff Blues
Amateur team(s)
Years	Team	Apps	(Points)
2007–2011	Newport GD		
2011–	Pontypridd RFC		
International career
Years	Team	Apps	(Points)
- Wales

Patrick Palmer (born 19 January 1988) is a Welsh rugby union player. A prop forward, he has represented Wales at Under 19 and Under 20 levels.

Palmer previously played for Cardiff RFC, Pontypridd RFC, and the Cardiff Blues Under-20 regional team. Palmer subsequently joined Newport Gwent Dragons and made his debut in the 2007–08 season. He was released by Newport Gwent Dragons at the end of the 2010–11 season, and rejoined Pontypridd.
