= Napier, Ontario =

Napier
- Etymology: Probably after Sir Charles James Napier
- Location of Napier in Ontario
- Coordinates: 42°52′07″N 81°46′08″W
- Country: Canada
- Province: Ontario
- Region: Southwestern Ontario
- County: Middlesex
- Municipality: Adelaide–Metcalfe
- Founded: 1829
- Elevation: 212 m (696 ft)
- Time zone: UTC-5 (Eastern Time Zone)
  - Summer (DST): UTC-4 (Eastern Time Zone)
- FSA: N7G
- Area codes: 519, 226

Napier is an unincorporated place on Napier Road in Adelaide–Metcalfe, western Middlesex County in southwestern Ontario, Canada. It is located on the Sydenham River 16 kilometres (10 mi) southwest of the community of Strathroy. Napier is almost a ghost town for many of its buildings have been torn down over the years and it has few or no businesses left.

== Early settlement ==
The area was first settled about 1829 by an unidentified disbanded military unit. At first settlers had to walk 20 miles (32 km) to Kilworth to reach a grist mill, 30 miles (48 km) to London to a market and miles to Port Stanley for tools and implements.

One early settler was Captain Christopher Beer who previously had spent 14 years in the Royal Navy. In 1830, Beer received 800 acres (324 ha) of land in what is now the Napier area along the Sydenham. He then returned to England to get his family, brought them back and built a two-storey log house near the present site of the village. The first Anglican services in the area were held in his home.

Another well-known early settler was Captain Robert Johnston who arrived with his family in 1832. Their log cabin was built across the road from the present Presbyterian church. Johnston, aged 72, was an old soldier who had served at Waterloo. He was not the average pioneer. He arrived in the wilderness with bagpipes, a piano, 30 complete sets of military arms and a substantial amount of money. Johnston built himself a large brick house 50 by 50 ft (15 by 15 m) with six chimneys. Soon Anglican services were moved to this large home.

== St. Mary's Church ==
One of the first public buildings constructed by these settlers was Sr. Mary's Anglican Church. The land for the church was donated by Charles Preston. The exact building date is not known but was probably about 1840. St. Mary's still stands, the oldest standing church in Middlesex County. The last regular service was held here in 1920 but yearly services began in 1931 and continue today.

A cemetery surrounds the church. When a sea captain, Christoper Beer, died in 1871, aged 80, he was buried in the southeast corner. His stone says "Anchored in the harbour of eternal rest." In the northwest corner are buried Joe and Mary Wrinkle. Joe was a fugitive slave from the southern US who worked for Captain Beer. Mary, his wife was white. When asked why she married Wrinkle, she replied, "His gracious manners and kindly ways took my fancy. The colour of his skin doesn't matter."

Other churches were built later. A frame Methodist church was built in 1860 and the first Presbyterian church was built in c.1864. The Presbyterian church was rebuilt in 1887 and set on a hill in the southwest part of the village where it still stands today.

== Development of the village ==
Napier developed into an active village. Robert Johnston built a store and gristmill in 1838, importing two millstones from Scotland. Johnston also had a sawmill built to harvest the many black walnut trees in the area. He then proceeded to build a large woollen mill. The village was known at first as Johnston's Mills. Later it was known as Puffing Town because of the noise made by the steam engine at Johnston's mills. This mill stood on the river behind the general store standing in the village today. People would walk to the mill from as far as Sarnia with bags of wheat on their backs to do their milling.

After the township of Metcalfe was created in 1840, the village became known as Metcalfe. When a post office opened on November 6, 1851, the village was named Napier, probably after Sir Charles James Napier (1782–1853), a British General, or perhaps after his brother, Sir William Francis Patrick Napier (1785–1860), also a general and historian of the Peninsular War.

In 1857, J. G. Sutherland moved into the area, bought the mills from Johnston and built a new woollen mill. The village population at this time was about 150. Sutherland's businesses dominated the community for many years. It was he who built the store known as Napier House in 1872; the post office moved into this building later.

Napier was important enough to become the township "capital." In 1880, the township council started holding regular meetings in the new Napier Town Hall.

== Decline of the village ==
Traditionally, Napier's fall is blamed on the railway. Two branches of both the Great Western Railway, later the CNR, bypassed Napier. The village was also bypassed by the CPR and Michigan Central. Much business was lost as settlers moved to larger communities along the railway.

Also, once the walnut trees were depleted, the village became less important because there was less work for the sawmills.

The village did not become a ghost town overnight but faded slowly during the late nineteenth and early twentieth centuries. In 1890, the gristmill burned and was never rebuilt. By 1900, all of Sutherland's mills and many small shopkeepers were gone. The post office closed on June 1, 1915, after which mail was delivered from Strathroy. The store closed in 1970.

== Napier today ==
Napier is worth visiting since many heritage landmarks remain. From the south, the first interesting building is a Masonic Temple built in 1955, replacing a previous building. On its lawn is a millstone that came from Sutherland's gristmill. Next door is St. Andrew's Presbyterian Church and across the road is the Napier House, which has been saved from the wrecking ball by a local committee of concerned citizens who raised funds to replace the crumbling foundation and restore the brick facade to its original appearance. Farther north on Mary Street is the old school, later a Women's Institute. North along Napier Road is Melwood Drive. A right turn will lead to St. Mary's Anglican Church on the left side.
