= Kyle Nichols =

Canada international rugby union player

- Born: 3 February 1975 (age 51) Scarborough, Ontario, Canada
- Height: 6 ft 1 in (185 cm)
- Weight: 205 lb (93 kg)

Rugby union career
- Position: Centre
International career
Years	Team	Apps	(Points)
1996–2002	Canada	25	(61)

Kyle Nichols (born February 3, 1975) is a Canadian former rugby union international.

Raised in Southern Ontario, Nichols attended Trinity College School and played his early rugby for Toronto-based club Balmy Beach RFC. His career included a stint of professional rugby in Wales with Newport RFC.

Nichols earned 25 Test caps for Canada, as a centre and occasional winger. At the 1999 Rugby World Cup, Nichols featured in two of Canada's matches, with the highlight a two try effort in the win over Namibia. His career best try tally in a match was four and came against Japan at Markham in 2000, to set a new Canadian record.

== See also ==
- List of Canada national rugby union players
