= Anthony Mathison =

- Born: 27 April 1981 (age 45) Brisbane, Queensland
- Height: 185 cm (6 ft 1 in)
- Weight: 115 kg (254 lb)
- School: Marist College Ashgrove

Rugby union career
- Position: Prop
Super Rugby
Years	Team	Apps	(Points)
2003–06	Reds	24	(0)
International career
Years	Team	Apps	(Points)
2005	Australia		

Anthony Mathison (born 27 April 1981) is an Australian former professional rugby union player.

Mathison was born in Brisbane and educated at Marist College Ashgrove.

A prop, Mathison represented Australian Schools, U-19s and U-21s. He established a place in the Queensland Reds front row during the 2004 Super 12 season and was in the Wallabies squad for the 2005 tour of Europe, making an uncapped appearance against the French Barbarians. A neck injury sustained while training in 2006 required a spinal fusion operation and upon his comeback to rugby he began suffering back problems, prompting his retirement.

Mathison coached GPS to the 2018 Queensland Premier Rugby championship title.
