= Juan Grobler =

American former rugby union player

- Born: July 7, 1973 (age 53) Zimbabwe
- Height: 6 ft 0 in (1.83 m)
- Weight: 103 kg (227 lb)
- School: Maritzburg College and Kingswood College (South Africa)
- University: Rhodes and Natal University

Rugby union career
- Position: Centre
Amateur team(s)
| Years | Team | Apps | (Points) |
- Denver Barbarians
| 2003–2004 | Gentlemen of Aspen RFC | | |
International career
| Years | Team | Apps | (Points) |
| 1996–2002 | United States | 34 | (35) |

Juan Grobler (born July 7, 1973) is a South African-American former rugby union player who played centre.

Grobler earned 34 caps for the U.S. national team from 1996–2002, scoring 7 tries and 35 points during his career.

== Rugby Union Career ==
Growing up Grobler played for Maritzburg College 1st team in 1990 and 1991 being selected to play for Natal Schools vs Northern Natal Schools and Natal Feader IX. Then he played for Kingswood 1st Team and the Eastern Province in the Craven Week schoolboys tournament and was vice captain, he then played for Natal U/20 and Natal U/21 earning 32 junior caps. Grobler made his Eagles debut September 14, 1996 in a 29–26 loss to Argentina in the Pacific Rim Championship. He scored his first try in a victory over Japan on May 25, 1997 in the Pacific Rim Championship. Grobler managed to score the only try conceded by Australia at the 1999 Rugby World Cup. Grobler also scored a try against England in 19–48 defeat at Boxer Stadium in 2001. Grobler was capped at 12,13 and 14 during his career Grobler played club rugby for Denver Barbarians and Gentlemen of Aspen RFC, both of which he captained.Grobler was also the youngest head coach of a Super League Team at 26 (Denver Barbarians RFC - 2000)
