= Bobby Ross (rugby union) =

Canada international rugby union player

- Born: August 29, 1969 (age 57) Victoria, British Columbia
- Height: 5 ft 11 in (1.80 m)
- Weight: 185 lb (84 kg)

Rugby union career
- Position: Fly-half
International career
Years	Team	Apps	(Points)
1989-2003	Canada	57	(421)

Robert P. Ross (born August 29, 1969 in Victoria, British Columbia) is a former Canadian national rugby player.

Growing up in Victoria, Bobby Ross was a multi-sport athlete, playing high school rugby, basketball and soccer, as well as baseball outside school. He was part of an extraordinary 1st XV at St. Michaels University School that went 14-0 in his final year and was the Vancouver Island Single A basketball MVP on a championship team. Shortly after graduation, he was selected to the Canadian Junior Baseball Team and competed in the World Junior Championships in 1987, batting .376 as Canada won the Bronze medal. A college baseball scholarship took him to Washington State for a year, but rugby brought him home, where he played for the University of Victoria (UVic) and captained the Canadian Junior Team to Wales in 1988. In his first game for UVic against UBC in the famous "Boot" rivalry, he stroked a 55m drop goal at the death to win the game! First capped in Victoria at inside centre against Ireland in 1989 at 20 years of age, Bobby went on to become one of the finest rugby players ever to play for Canada. He was capped 57 times between 1989 and 2003 and throughout his playing years he was renowned for his exceptional kicking abilities, scoring 421 test points which ranked him as Canada's third all-time scorer. On retirement, he was ranked 14th all-time in international rugby scoring. A versatile player, he was capped in the centre, wing and fullback positions but spent the majority of his career at fly half, where he read the game beautifully. During his UVic years, he was l989 Junior Varsity Athlete of the Year. He played with the famed James Bay Athletic Association through six Island and four Provincial titles and was four-time club MVP. Against Wales in 1997, a 56m drop goal at the opening kickoff (one of the longest and possibly the quickest drop goal in test history) plus a try in that game earned him a professional contract with Cardiff in the Welsh Premier League, playing in the European (Heineken) Cup, and helping pioneer Canadians in the European game. He captained the Canadian Under 19, Under 21 and Senior Men's teams and was once capped for all three in the same year. He represented Canada in three World Cups (1995, 1999, 2003), set the Canadian record for drop goals that still stands and is the all-time Pacific Rim Championships scoring leader. Always a team player, he came out of retirement for the 2003 World Cup and, in his last game for Canada, Bobby was named Man of the Match. He was a consummate pro on and off the field. Bobby has been inducted into the BC Rugby Hall of Fame (2019), Greater Victoria Sports Hall of Fame (2020), the Rugby Canada Hall of Fame (2021) and most recently the North American Indigenous Athletics Hall of Fame (2026). As a proud member of the Songhees Nation, he was also recognized in a Native Capping Ceremony by Thunder Indigenous Rugby, an organization of which he has been a board member since its inception in 2015.
