= Al Charron =

Canada international rugby union player

- Born: 27 July 1966 (age 60) Ottawa, Ontario, Canada
- Height: 1.95 m (6 ft 5 in)
- Weight: 123 kg (271 lb)
- School: Hillcrest High School
- University: Carleton University

Rugby union career
- Position: Lock / Flanker #8
Amateur team(s)
Years	Team	Apps	(Points)
1986–1997	Carleton University		
–	Ottawa Irish		
Senior career
Years	Team	Apps	(Points)
1997–2002	Bristol		
–	Pau		
–	Dax		
–	Moseley		
International career
Years	Team	Apps	(Points)
1989–2003	Canada	76	(44)

Alan Charron (born 27 July 1966 in Ottawa, Ontario) is a former Canadian rugby union player. At the international level, he represented the Canadian men's national team as a back-row forward and was capped 76 times (all starting caps).

Charron played amateur club rugby for the Ottawa Irish. He played professionally in England at Moseley Rugby Football Club and Bristol, as well as in France at Pau and Dax. While playing with Moseley and Bristol, he was voted the supporters' Player of the Season for 1996/97 and 1998/99 respectively and was awarded the BBC West Rugby Player of the Year award in 1999.

Charron represented the Eastern Ontario union for many years, winning the national interbranch championship in 1992. He won the national provincial championships twice with Ontario in 1995 and 1996.

Charron represented Canada at the 1991 Rugby World Cup, defeating Fiji and Romania. In autumn 1993, he scored a try to defeat Wales at Cardiff Arms Park.

After recovering from a severe knee injury, he participated in the 2003 Rugby World Cup as the captain of Canada, his fourth Rugby World Cup tournament. Charron retired from international rugby union on Canada's defeat of Tonga in the 2003 Rugby World Cup pool match. In 2007, he went to the Rugby World Cup as part of Canada's management team.

Charron was inducted into the Eastern Ontario Wall of Fame, Ontario Rugby Hall of Fame, Ottawa Sports Hall of Fame, and the Ontario Sport Hall of Fame. He was voted on two occasions as Canada's outstanding player of the year. Charron became Canada's third inductee into the World Rugby Hall of Fame in 2017. Charron finished his international career with 76 games played, 44 total points, and 9 tries scored.
