= Rod Snow =

Canada international rugby union player

- Born: 5 January 1970 (age 56) Bonavista, Newfoundland and Labrador, Canada
- Height: 1.80 m (5 ft 11 in)
- Weight: 116 kg (256 lb)
- School: Mount Pearl Senior High

Rugby union career
- Position: Prop / Hooker
Senior career
Years	Team	Apps	(Points)
1995–2005	Newport RFC	190	(150)
2003–2005	Newport Gwent Dragons	41	(5)
International career
Years	Team	Apps	(Points)
1995–2007	Canada	62	(40)

Rod Snow (born 1 May 1970) is a Canadian former professional rugby union player who played in the front row, predominantly as a prop but also infrequently as a hooker.

Snow began his senior rugby career with the Newfoundland amateur club team Dogs RFC. He went on to play professionally in South Africa for Eastern Province in 1995, before joining Newport RFC in 1996. In 2003, he was given a contract with the newly formed Newport Gwent Dragons regional side, for whom he played for two seasons. He played 41 times for the Dragons, his only try coming at the start of the 2004–05 season in a 38–29 away win over Glasgow Warriors.

Snow earned 62 caps for Canada between May 1995 and September 2007. He also played for the Barbarians in 1996 against Wales, a match which they lost 31–10.

Snow retired from professional rugby at the end of the 2004–05 season and returned to his home province to play for Newfoundland Rock in their national-championship-winning season. He also took a position as the project manager for the Newfoundland and Labrador Sports Centre, a new development that would upgrade the Swilers RFC complex into a multi-sport provincial training centre.

Snow accepted an invitation from Canada coach Ric Suggitt to return to the national team for the 2006 Churchill Cup. Following this tournament, Snow helped Newfoundland Rock to a second Rugby Canada Super League title in August 2006. The season was not finished, however, as Snow also scored the winning try over the United States Eagles in a Rugby World Cup qualifying match played in his home town of St. John's, Newfoundland and Labrador. Although he was left out of the preliminary 32-man squad for the 2007 Rugby World Cup, he was recalled for the final 30-man squad. He started all four of Canada's matches at the final tournament in France; however, their best result was a draw against Japan and they finished bottom of Pool B.

In 2012, he retired from all levels of rugby. Snow was named an inaugural inductees for Rugby Canada's Hall of Fame and was inducted into the Newport Rugby Hall of Fame. Additional honours include being named third-best prop in the world by World Rugby Magazine in 1999, and the Sports Newfoundland and Labrador's senior male athlete of the year in 1995.
