= 2007 Rugby World Cup Pool A =

Pool A of the 2007 Rugby World Cup began on 8 September and was completed on 30 September. The pool was composed of 2003 World Cup winners England, as well as Samoa, South Africa, Tonga and United States.

== Standings ==
Pool A threw up few surprises, with both South Africa and England qualifying for the quarter-finals, as expected. Third place went to Tonga, who beat the USA and South Pacific neighbours, Samoa, to secure a place in the 2011 Rugby World Cup. Tonga also gave the eventual champions a close run, losing by less than a try. Both South Africa and England went on to reach the final of the tournament, which South Africa won by 15 points to 6.

Pos	Team	Pld	W	D	L	PF	PA	PD	B	Pts	Qualification
1	South Africa	4	4	0	0	189	47	+142	3	19	Advanced to the quarter-finals and qualified for the 2011 Rugby World Cup
2	England	4	3	0	1	108	88	+20	2	14	Advanced to the quarter-finals and qualified for the 2011 Rugby World Cup
3	Tonga	4	2	0	2	89	96	−7	1	9	Eliminated, automatic qualification for 2011 Rugby World Cup
4	Samoa	4	1	0	3	69	143	−74	1	5	
5	United States	4	0	0	4	61	142	−81	1	1	

== Matches ==
All times local (UTC+2)

=== England vs United States ===
8 September 2007
18:00

England	28–10	United States
Try: Robinson 35' m Barkley 40+' c Rees 49' c Con: Barkley (2/3); Pen: Barkley (3/3) 7', 22', 31'	Report	Try: Moeakiola 74' c Con: Hercus (1/1); Pen: Hercus (1/1) 9'

Stade Félix Bollaert, Lens
Attendance: 36,755
Referee: Jonathan Kaplan (South Africa)

FB	15	Mark Cueto
RW	14	Josh Lewsey
OC	13	Jamie Noon
IC	12	Mike Catt		(substituted off) 63'
LW	11	Jason Robinson		(substituted off) 57'
FH	10	Olly Barkley
SH	9	Shaun Perry		(substituted off) 60'
N8	8	Lawrence Dallaglio	(yellow card) 74'
OF	7	Tom Rees
BF	6	Joe Worsley		(substituted off) 69'
RL	5	Ben Kay
LL	4	Simon Shaw		(substituted off) 63'
TP	3	Phil Vickery (c)		(substituted off) 63'
HK	2	Mark Regan		(substituted off) 63'
LP	1	Andrew Sheridan
Replacements:
HK	16	George Chuter		(substituted in) 63'
PR	17	Matt Stevens		(substituted in) 63'
LK	18	Martin Corry		(substituted in) 63'
FL	19	Lewis Moody		(substituted in) 69'
SH	20	Peter Richards		(substituted in) 60'
CE	21	Andy Farrell		(substituted in) 63'
CE	22	Mathew Tait		(substituted in) 57'
Coach:
(England) Brian Ashton

FB	15	Chris Wyles
RW	14	Salesi Sika		(substituted off) 52'
OC	13	Paul Emerick	(yellow card) 80+'
IC	12	Vahafolau Esikia	(yellow card) 30'
LW	11	Takudzwa Ngwenya
FH	10	Mike Hercus (c)
SH	9	Chad Erskine
N8	8	Henry Bloomfield		(substituted off) 56'
OF	7	Todd Clever
BF	6	Louis Stanfill
RL	5	Mike Mangan		(substituted off) 69'
LL	4	Alec Parker
TP	3	Chris Osentowski
HK	2	Owen Lentz		(substituted off) 53'
LP	1	Mike MacDonald		(substituted off) 60'
Replacements:
HK	16	Blake Burdette		(substituted in) 53'
PR	17	Matekitonga Moeakiola		(substituted in) 60'
LK	18	Hayden Mexted		(substituted in) 69'
FL	19	Inaki Basauri		(substituted in) 56'
SH	20	Michael Petri
FH	21	Nese Malifa		(substituted in) 52'
CE	22	Albert Tuipulotu
Coach:
(New Zealand) Peter Thorburn

Man of the Match:
Olly Barkley (England)

Touch judges:
Lyndon Bray (New Zealand)
Bryce Lawrence (New Zealand)
Television match official:
Stuart Dickinson (Australia)
Fourth official:
Bruno Gaudefrin (France)
Fifth official:
Eric Molier (France)

=== South Africa vs Samoa ===
9 September 2007
16:00

South Africa	59–7	Samoa
Try: Habana (4) 33' m, 56' c, 66' c, 76' m Montgomery (2) 40+' c, 53' m Fourie 47' c JP Pietersen 80+' c Con: Montgomery (5/8); Pen: Montgomery (3/3) 3', 10', 15'	Report	Try: Williams 18' c Con: Williams (1/1)

Parc des Princes, Paris
Attendance: 46,575
Referee: Paul Honiss (New Zealand)

FB	15	Percy Montgomery
RW	14	JP Pietersen
OC	13	Jaque Fourie
IC	12	Jean de Villiers	(substituted off) 43'
LW	11	Bryan Habana
FH	10	Butch James	(substituted off) 59'
SH	9	Fourie du Preez	(substituted off) 65'
N8	8	Danie Rossouw	(substituted off) 65'
BF	7	Juan Smith
OF	6	Schalk Burger
RL	5	Victor Matfield
LL	4	Bakkies Botha	(substituted off) 67'
TP	3	CJ van der Linde		(substituted off) 67'
HK	2	John Smit (c)	(substituted off) 64'
LP	1	Os du Randt	(substituted off) 51'	(substituted in) 67'
Replacements:
HK	16	Bismarck du Plessis	(substituted in) 64'
PR	17	BJ Botha	(substituted in) 51'
LK	18	Johannes Muller	(substituted in) 67'
FL	19	Wikus van Heerden	(substituted in) 65'
SH	20	Ricky Januarie	(substituted in) 65'
FH	21	André Pretorius	(substituted in) 59'
FB	22	François Steyn	(substituted in) 43'
Coach:
(South Africa) Jake White

FB	15	David Lemi
RW	14	Lome Fa'atau	(substituted off) 61'
OC	13	Gavin Williams
IC	12	Jerry Meafou	(substituted off) 61'
LW	11	Alesana Tuilagi
FH	10	Eliota Fuimaono-Sapolu	(substituted off) 59'
SH	9	Junior Polu
N8	8	Henry Tuilagi	(substituted off) 57'
OF	7	Semo Sititi (c)
BF	6	Daniel Leo
RL	5	Kane Thompson
LL	4	Joe Tekori	(substituted off) 63'
TP	3	Census Johnston
HK	2	Mahonri Schwalger
LP	1	Justin Va'a	(substituted off) 63'
Replacements:
HK	16	Tani Fuga		(substituted in) 65'
PR	17	Kas Lealamanua	(substituted in) 63'
PR	18	Alfie Vaeluaga	(substituted in) 57'
FL	19	Justin Purdie	(substituted in) 63'
CE	20	Elvis Seveali'i	(substituted in) 61'
FH	21	Loki Crichton	(substituted in) 59'
WG	22	Brian Lima	(substituted in) 61'	(substituted off) 65'
Coach:
(New Zealand) Michael Jones

Man of the Match:
Percy Montgomery (South Africa)

Touch judges:
Chris White (England)
Lyndon Bray (New Zealand)
Television match official:
Bryce Lawrence (New Zealand)
Fourth official:
Stuart Dickinson (Australia)
Fifth official:
Eric Gauzins (France)

=== United States vs Tonga ===
12 September 2007
14:00

United States	15–25	Tonga
Try: MacDonald 47' m Stanfill 67' c Con: Hercus (1/2); Pen: Hercus (1/2) 33'	Report	Try: Maka 2' c Vaka 59' m Vaki 70' c Con: Hola (2/3); Pen: Hola (2/2) 7', 26'

Stade de la Mosson, Montpellier
Attendance: 25,214
Referee: Stuart Dickinson (Australia)

FB	15	Chris Wyles
RW	14	Salesi Sika
OC	13	Albert Tuipulotu
IC	12	Vahafolau Esikia	(substituted off) 61'
LW	11	Takudzwa Ngwenya
FH	10	Mike Hercus (c)
SH	9	Chad Erskine
N8	8	Henry Bloomfield	(substituted off) 54'
OF	7	Todd Clever
BF	6	Louis Stanfill
RL	5	Mike Mangan
LL	4	Alec Parker
TP	3	Chris Osentowski
HK	2	Owen Lentz	(substituted off) 47'
LP	1	Mike MacDonald	(substituted off) 54'
Replacements:
HK	16	Blake Burdette	(substituted in) 47'
PR	17	Matekitonga Moeakiola	(substituted in) 54'
LK	18	Hayden Mexted
FL	19	Inaki Basauri	(substituted in) 54'
SH	20	Michael Petri
FH	21	Nese Malifa
CE	22	Philip Eloff	(substituted in) 61'
Coach:
(New Zealand) Peter Thorburn

FB	15	Vunga Lilo
RW	14	Tevita Tuʻifua
OC	13	Suka Hufanga
IC	12	Epi Taione	(substituted off) 71'
LW	11	Joseph Vaka	(substituted off) 61'
FH	10	Pierre Hola
SH	9	Soane Havea	(substituted off) 41'
N8	8	Finau Maka	(substituted off) 65'
OF	7	Nili Latu (c)	(substituted off) 65'
BF	6	Hale T-Pole
RL	5	Paino Hehea
LL	4	Lisiate Faʻaoso
TP	3	Kisi Pulu
HK	2	Aleki Lutui	(substituted off) 76'
LP	1	Soane Tongaʻuiha	(substituted off) 66'
Replacements:
HK	16	Ephraim Taukafa	(substituted in) 76'
PR	17	Toma Toke	(substituted in) 66'
FL	18	Viliami Vaki	(substituted in) 65'
N8	19	Lotu Filipine	(substituted in) 65'
FB	20	Sione Tuʻipulotu	(substituted in) 41'
CE	21	Isileli Tupou	(substituted in) 71'
WG	22	Aisea Havili	(substituted in) 61'
Coach:
(Tonga) Quddus Fielea

Man of the Match:
Mike MacDonald (United States)

Touch judges:
Craig Joubert (South Africa)
Christophe Berdos (France)
Television match official:
Mark Lawrence (South Africa)
Fourth official:
Paul Honiss (New Zealand)
Fifth official:
Jean-Christophe Gastou (France)

=== England vs South Africa ===
14 September 2007
21:00

England	0–36	South Africa
	Report	Try: Smith 6' c Pietersen (2) 38' c, 64' c Con: Montgomery (3/3); Pen: Steyn (1/1) 11'; Montgomery (4/4) 36', 46', 55', 79'

Stade de France, Saint-Denis
Attendance: 77,523
Referee: Joël Jutge (France)

FB	15	Jason Robinson	(substituted off) 58'
RW	14	Josh Lewsey
OC	13	Jamie Noon	(substituted off) 80'
IC	12	Andy Farrell
LW	11	Paul Sackey
FH	10	Mike Catt
SH	9	Shaun Perry	(substituted off) 41'
N8	8	Nick Easter
OF	7	Tom Rees	(substituted off) 53'
BF	6	Martin Corry (c)
RL	5	Ben Kay
LL	4	Simon Shaw	55' to 60'		(substituted off) 78'
TP	3	Matt Stevens
HK	2	Mark Regan	(substituted off) 56'
LP	1	Andrew Sheridan	(substituted off) 78'
Replacements:
HK	16	George Chuter	(substituted in) 56'
PR	17	Perry Freshwater	(substituted in) 78'
LK	18	Steve Borthwick	(substituted in) 55'	(substituted off) 60'	(substituted in) 78'
FL	19	Lewis Moody	(substituted in) 53'
SH	20	Andy Gomarsall	(substituted in) 41'
SH	21	Peter Richards	(substituted in) 80'
CE	22	Mathew Tait	(substituted in) 58'
Coach:
(England) Brian Ashton

FB	15	Percy Montgomery
RW	14	JP Pietersen
OC	13	Jaque Fourie
IC	12	François Steyn	(substituted off) 76'
LW	11	Bryan Habana	56' to 61'
FH	10	Butch James	(substituted off) 71'
SH	9	Fourie du Preez	(substituted off) 67'
N8	8	Danie Rossouw
BF	7	Juan Smith	(substituted off) 71'
OF	6	Wikus van Heerden
RL	5	Victor Matfield
LL	4	Bakkies Botha	(substituted off) 53'
TP	3	BJ Botha
HK	2	John Smit (c)	(substituted off) 71'
LP	1	Os du Randt	(substituted off) 61'
Replacements:
HK	16	Bismarck du Plessis	(substituted in) 71'
PR	17	CJ van der Linde	(substituted in) 61'
LK	18	Johannes Muller	(substituted in) 53'
N8	19	Bobby Skinstad	(substituted in) 71'
SH	20	Ruan Pienaar	(substituted in) 56'	(substituted off) 61'	(substituted in) 67'
FH	21	André Pretorius	(substituted in) 71'
CE	22	Wynand Olivier	(substituted in) 76'
Coach:
(South Africa) Jake White

Man of the Match:
Fourie du Preez (South Africa)

Touch judges:
Kelvin Deaker (New Zealand)
Carlo Damasco (Italy)
Television match official:
Simon McDowell (Ireland)
Fourth official:
Jonathan Kaplan (South Africa)
Fifth official:
Eric Gauzins (France)

Notes

- Percy Montgomery equalled Joost van der Westhuizen as the most-capped Springbok with his 89th appearance.
- This was the first scoreless match for England at the World Cup; it was also the first time a past World Champion had failed to score in a World Cup match. It was only the fifth time a side had failed to score in a World Cup match, after Canada, Spain, Namibia and Romania, although Scotland joined this list later in the tournament.
- This was the first meeting in the pool stage of a Rugby World Cup between two former champions.

=== Samoa vs Tonga ===
16 September 2007
16:00

Samoa	15–19	Tonga
Pen: Williams (5/6) 6', 21', 23', 29', 69'	Report	Try: Taione 60' c Con: Hola (1/1); Pen: Hola (4/5) 3', 38', 47', 67'

Stade de la Mosson, Montpellier
Attendance: 24,128
Referee: Jonathan Kaplan (South Africa)

FB	15	Gavin Williams	(substituted off) 80'
RW	14	Sailosi Tagicakibau	(substituted off) 56'
OC	13	Elvis Seveali'i
IC	12	Seilala Mapusua
LW	11	Alesana Tuilagi
FH	10	Loki Crichton
SH	9	Steve So'oialo	(substituted off) 56'
N8	8	Semo Sititi (c)
OF	7	Ulia Ulia	(substituted off) 62'
BF	6	Daniel Leo
RL	5	Kane Thompson
LL	4	Joe Tekori	(substituted off) 62'
TP	3	Census Johnston	(substituted off) 56'	(substituted in) 80'
HK	2	Mahonri Schwalger	(substituted off) 59'
LP	1	Justin Va'a
Replacements:
HK	16	Tanielu Fuga	(substituted in) 59'
HK	17	Muliufi Salanoa	(substituted in) 56'	(substituted in) 80'
LK	18	Leo Lafaiali'i	(substituted in) 62'
FL	19	Justin Purdie	(substituted in) 62'
SH	20	Junior Polu	(substituted in) 56'
FH	21	Lolo Lui	(substituted in) 80'
WG	22	David Lemi	(substituted in) 56'
Coach:
(New Zealand) Michael Jones

FB	15	Vunga Lilo
RW	14	Tevita Tuʻifua
OC	13	Suka Hufanga
IC	12	Epi Taione	(yellow card) 28'	(substituted off) 73'
LW	11	Joseph Vaka
FH	10	Pierre Hola
SH	9	Enele Taufa		(substituted off) 43'
N8	8	Finau Maka			(substituted off) 80'
OF	7	Nili Latu (c)
BF	6	Hale T-Pole	(red card) 72'
RL	5	Paino Hehea
LL	4	Inoke Afeaki		(substituted off) 56'
TP	3	Kisi Pulu
HK	2	Ephraim Taukafa		(substituted off) 50'
LP	1	Soane Tongaʻuiha		(substituted off) 73'	(substituted in) 80'
Replacements:
HK	16	Aleki Lutui		(substituted in) 50'
PR	17	Toma Toke	(yellow card) 75'	(substituted in) 73'
FL	18	Viliami Vaki		(substituted in) 56'
FL	19	Emosi Kauhenga
FB	20	Sione Tuʻipulotu		(substituted in) 43'
CE	21	Isileli Tupou		(substituted in) 73'
FB	22	Hudson Tongaʻuiha
Coach:
(Tonga) Quddus Fielea

Man of the Match:
Finau Maka (Tonga)

Touch judges:
Alan Lewis (Ireland)
Bryce Lawrence (New Zealand)
Television match official:
Lyndon Bray (New Zealand)
Fourth official:
Stuart Dickinson (Australia)
Fifth official:
Jean-Christophe Gastou (France)

=== South Africa vs Tonga ===
22 September 2007
14:00

South Africa	30–25	Tonga
Try: Pienaar (2) 18' c, 65' m Smith 59' c Skinstad 62' m Con: Pretorius (1/1); Montgomery (1/3); Pen: Steyn (1/1) 54'; Montgomery (1/1) 76'	Report	Try: Pulu 44' c Hufanga 70' m Vaki 72' c Con: Hola (2/3); Pen: Hola (2/3) 9', 78'

Stade Félix Bollaert, Lens
Attendance: 40,069
Referee: Wayne Barnes (England)

FB	15	Ruan Pienaar
RW	14	Ashwin Willemse		(substituted off) 48'
OC	13	Wynand Olivier
IC	12	Wayne Julies		(substituted off) 48'
LW	11	JP Pietersen
FH	10	André Pretorius		(substituted off) 60'
SH	9	Ricky Januarie
N8	8	Bobby Skinstad (c)
BF	7	Danie Rossouw		25' to 31'		(substituted off) 50'
OF	6	Wikus van Heerden
RL	5	Albert van den Berg		(substituted off) 48'
LL	4	Bakkies Botha
TP	3	CJ van der Linde
HK	2	Gary Botha		(substituted off) 48'
LP	1	Gurthro Steenkamp		(substituted off) 48'
Replacements:
HK	16	John Smit		(substituted in) 48'
PR	17	BJ Botha		(substituted in) 48'
LK	18	Victor Matfield		(substituted in) 48'
FL	19	Juan Smith		(substituted in) 25'	(substituted off) 31'	(substituted in) 50'
WG	20	Bryan Habana	(yellow card) 69'	(substituted in) 48'
FH	21	François Steyn	(yellow card) 63'	(substituted in) 48'
FB	22	Percy Montgomery		(substituted in) 60'
Coach:
(South Africa) Jake White

FB	15	Vunga Lilo
RW	14	Tevita Tuʻifua
OC	13	Suka Hufanga
IC	12	Epi Taione		(substituted off) 77'
LW	11	Joseph Vaka	(yellow card) 63'	(substituted off) 73'
FH	10	Pierre Hola
SH	9	Sione Tuʻipulotu		(substituted off) 67'
N8	8	Finau Maka
OF	7	Nili Latu (c)		(substituted off) 67'
BF	6	Viliami Vaki
RL	5	Emosi Kauhenga		51' to 67'
LL	4	Paino Hehea			(substituted off) 67'
TP	3	Kisi Pulu
HK	2	Aleki Lutui		(substituted off) 67'
LP	1	Soane Tongaʻuiha
Replacements:
HK	16	Ephraim Taukafa		(substituted in) 67'
PR	17	Toma Toke
LK	18	Inoke Afeaki		(substituted in) 51'
FL	19	Lotu Filipine		(substituted in) 67'
SH	20	Soane Havea		(substituted in) 67'
CE	21	Isileli Tupou		(substituted in) 77'
WG	22	Aisea Havili		(substituted in) 73'
Coach:
(Tonga) Quddus Fielea

Man of the Match:
Finau Maka (Tonga)

Touch judges:
Federico Cuesta (Argentina)
Paul Marks (Australia)
Television match official:
Malcolm Changleng (Scotland)
Fourth official:
Tony Spreadbury (England)
Fifth official:
Bruno Gaudefrin (France)

Notes

- Percy Montgomery earns his 90th cap, surpassing Joost van der Westhuizen as the most-capped Springbok.

=== England vs Samoa ===
22 September 2007
16:00

England	44–22	Samoa
Try: Corry (2) 2' c, 76' c Sackey (2) 32' c, 80+' m Con: Wilkinson (3/4); Pen: Wilkinson (4/6) 15', 22', 33', 72'; Drop: Wilkinson (2/3) 6', 69'	Report	Try: Polu 47' c Con: Crichton (1/1); Pen: Crichton (5/5) 9', 12', 38', 40+, 42'

Stade de la Beaujoire, Nantes
Attendance: 37,022
Referee: Alan Lewis (Ireland)

FB	15	Josh Lewsey
RW	14	Paul Sackey
OC	13	Mathew Tait	(substituted off) 73'
IC	12	Olly Barkley
LW	11	Mark Cueto
FH	10	Jonny Wilkinson
SH	9	Andy Gomarsall
N8	8	Nick Easter
OF	7	Joe Worsley	(substituted off) 70'
BF	6	Martin Corry (c)
RL	5	Ben Kay
LL	4	Simon Shaw	(substituted off) 65'
TP	3	Matt Stevens
HK	2	George Chuter
LP	1	Andrew Sheridan	(substituted off) 65'
Replacements:
HK	16	Mark Regan
PR	17	Perry Freshwater	(substituted in) 65'
LK	18	Steve Borthwick	(substituted in) 65'
FL	19	Lewis Moody	(substituted in) 70'
SH	20	Peter Richards
CE	21	Andy Farrell
CE	22	Dan Hipkiss	(substituted in) 73'
Coach:
(England) Brian Ashton

FB	15	Loki Crichton
RW	14	David Lemi
OC	13	Seilala Mapusua	(substituted off) 70'
IC	12	Brian Lima	(substituted off) 73'
LW	11	Alesana Tuilagi
FH	10	Eliota Fuimaono-Sapolu
SH	9	Junior Polu	(substituted off) 67'
N8	8	Henry Tuilagi	(substituted off) 70'
OF	7	Semo Sititi (c)
BF	6	Daniel Leo
RL	5	Kane Thompson
LL	4	Joe Tekori	(substituted off) 75'
TP	3	Census Johnston		(substituted off) 75'
HK	2	Mahonri Schwalger
LP	1	Kas Lealamanua	(substituted off) 62'	(substituted in) 75'
Replacements:
HK	16	Tanielu Fuga
PR	17	Fosi Pala'amo	(substituted in) 62'
FL	18	Justin Purdie	(substituted in) 75'
PR	19	Alfie Vaeluaga	(substituted in) 70'
CE	20	Steve So'oialo	(substituted in) 67'
CE	21	Jerry Meafou	(substituted in) 70'
FH	22	Lolo Lui	(substituted in) 73'
Coach:
(New Zealand) Michael Jones

Man of the Match:
Loki Crichton (Samoa)

Touch judges:
Alain Rolland (Ireland)
Lyndon Bray (New Zealand)
Television match official:
Bryce Lawrence (New Zealand)
Fourth official:
Steve Walsh (New Zealand)
Fifth official:
Eric Gauzins (France)

=== Samoa vs United States ===
26 September 2007
20:00

Samoa	25–21	United States
Try: Fa'atau 5' m Tuilagi 9' c Thompson 37' c Con: Crichton (2/3); Pen: Crichton (2/2) 30', 72'	Report	Try: Ngwenya 53' c Stanfill 79' m Con: Hercus (1/2); Pen: Hercus (3/4) 32', 65', 75'

Stade Geoffroy-Guichard, Saint-Étienne
Attendance: 34,134
Referee: Wayne Barnes (England)

FB	15	Loki Crichton
RW	14	Lome Fa'atau		(substituted off) 60'	(substituted in) 79'
OC	13	Elvis Seveali'i
IC	12	Seilala Mapusua			(substituted off) 79'
LW	11	Alesana Tuilagi
FH	10	Eliota Fuimaono-Sapolu		(substituted off) 70'
SH	9	Junior Polu		(substituted off) 70'
N8	8	Alfie Vaeluaga		(substituted off) 67'	(substituted in) 70'
OF	7	Justin Purdie			(substituted off) 78'
BF	6	Semo Sititi (c)
RL	5	Kane Thompson		(substituted off) 64'
LL	4	Leo Lafaiali'i
TP	3	Census Johnston
HK	2	Mahonri Schwalger		(substituted off) 73'	(substituted in) 78'
LP	1	Kas Lealamanua		(substituted off) 70'
Replacements:
HK	16	Silao Vaisola Sefo	(yellow card) 76'	(substituted in) 73'
PR	17	Na'ama Leleimalefaga		(substituted in) 70'
LK	18	Joe Tekori		(substituted in) 64'
FL	19	Ulia Ulia		(substituted in) 67'	(substituted off) 70'
SH	20	Steve So'oialo		(substituted in) 70'
WG	21	David Lemi		(substituted in) 60'
FH	22	Lolo Lui		(substituted in) 70'
Coach:
(New Zealand) Michael Jones

FB	15	Chris Wyles
RW	14	Takudzwa Ngwenya
OC	13	Philip Eloff
IC	12	Vahafolau Esikia		(substituted off) 73'
LW	11	Salesi Sika
FH	10	Mike Hercus (c)
SH	9	Chad Erskine
N8	8	Fifita Mounga	(yellow card) 52'	(substituted off) 64'
OF	7	Todd Clever		(substituted off) 45'
BF	6	Louis Stanfill
RL	5	Hayden Mexted
LL	4	Alec Parker
TP	3	Chris Osentowski
HK	2	Owen Lentz
LP	1	Mike MacDonald		(substituted off) 68'
Replacements:
HK	16	Blake Burdette		(substituted in) 45'
PR	17	Matekitonga Moeakiola		(substituted in) 68'
N8	18	Henry Bloomfield
FL	19	Mark Aylor		(substituted in) 64'
SH	20	Michael Petri
FH	21	Nese Malifa
CE	22	Albert Tuipulotu		(substituted in) 73'
Coach:
(New Zealand) Peter Thorburn

Man of the Match:
Eliota Fuimaono-Sapolu (Samoa)

Touch judges:
Hugh Watkins (Wales)
Mark Lawrence (South Africa)
Television match official:
Dave Pearson (England)
Fourth official:
Nigel Owens (Wales)
Fifth official:
Cyril Lafon (France)

=== England vs Tonga ===
28 September 2007
21:00

England	36–20	Tonga
Try: Sackey (2) 20' m, 38' m Tait 57' c Farrell 66' c Con: Wilkinson (2/4); Pen: Wilkinson (2/3) 14', 36'; Drop: Wilkinson (2/2) 32', 72'	Report	Try: Hufanga 17' c T-Pole 80' c Con: Hola (2/2); Pen: Hola (2/2) 11', 55'

Parc des Princes, Paris
Attendance: 45,085
Referee: Alain Rolland (Ireland)

FB	15	Josh Lewsey
RW	14	Paul Sackey	(substituted off) 69'
OC	13	Mathew Tait
IC	12	Olly Barkley	(substituted off) 52'
LW	11	Mark Cueto	(substituted off) 73'
FH	10	Jonny Wilkinson
SH	9	Andy Gomarsall
N8	8	Nick Easter
OF	7	Lewis Moody
BF	6	Martin Corry (c)	(substituted off) 64'
RL	5	Ben Kay
LL	4	Steve Borthwick
TP	3	Matt Stevens	(substituted off) 58'
HK	2	George Chuter	(substituted off) 68'
LP	1	Andrew Sheridan
Replacements:
HK	16	Lee Mears	(substituted in) 68'
PR	17	Phil Vickery	(substituted in) 58'
N8	18	Lawrence Dallaglio	(substituted in) 64'
FL	19	Joe Worsley
SH	20	Peter Richards	(substituted in) 73'
CE	21	Andy Farrell	(substituted in) 52'
CE	22	Dan Hipkiss	(substituted in) 69'
Coach:
(England) Brian Ashton

FB	15	Vunga Lilo
RW	14	Tevita Tuʻifua
OC	13	Suka Hufanga	(substituted off) 60'
IC	12	Epi Taione
LW	11	Joseph Vaka	(substituted off) 67'
FH	10	Pierre Hola
SH	9	Sione Tuʻipulotu	(substituted off) 69'
N8	8	Finau Maka
OF	7	Nili Latu (c)
BF	6	Hale T-Pole
RL	5	Lisiate Faʻaoso	(substituted off) 67'
LL	4	Viliami Vaki	(substituted off) 61'
TP	3	Kisi Pulu
HK	2	Aleki Lutui	(substituted off) 65'
LP	1	Soane Tongaʻuiha	46' to 50'		(substituted off) 55'
Replacements:
HK	16	Ephraim Taukafa	(substituted in) 65'
PR	17	Taufaʻao Filise	(substituted in) 46'	(substituted off) 50'	(substituted in) 55'
FL	18	Maama Molitika	(substituted in) 61'
LK	19	Inoke Afeaki	(substituted in) 67'
SH	20	Paino Hehea	(substituted in) 69'
FB	21	Hudson Tongaʻuiha	(substituted in) 60'
WG	22	Aisea Havili	(substituted in) 67'
Coach:
(Tonga) Quddus Fielea

Man of the Match:
Paul Sackey (England)

Touch judges:
Craig Joubert (South Africa)
Christophe Berdos (France)
Television match official:
Mark Lawrence (South Africa)
Fourth official:
Tony Spreadbury (England)
Fifth official:
Eric Molier (France)

=== South Africa vs United States ===
30 September 2007
20:00

South Africa	64–15	United States
Try: Burger 10' c Steyn 28' c Habana (2) 35' c, 42' m van der Linde 48' c du Preez 54' c Fourie (2) 64' c, 73' c Smith 77' c Con: Montgomery (6/7); James (2/2); Pen: Montgomery (1/1) 17'	Report	Try: Ngwenya 39' c Wyles 51' m Con: Hercus (1/2); Pen: Hercus (1/1) 20'

Stade de la Mosson, Montpellier
Attendance: 30,485
Referee: Tony Spreadbury (England)

FB	15	Percy Montgomery	(substituted off) 67'
RW	14	Akona Ndungane
OC	13	Jaque Fourie
IC	12	François Steyn	(substituted off) 67'
LW	11	Bryan Habana	(substituted off) 53'
FH	10	Butch James
SH	9	Fourie du Preez
N8	8	Schalk Burger
BF	7	Juan Smith
OF	6	Wikus van Heerden	(substituted off) 71'
RL	5	Victor Matfield		(substituted off) 75'
LL	4	Albert van den Berg	(substituted off) 56'	(substituted in) 75'
TP	3	BJ Botha	(substituted off) 25'
HK	2	John Smit (c)
LP	1	Os du Randt	(substituted off) 72'
Replacements:
HK	16	Bismarck du Plessis	(substituted in) 72'
PR	17	CJ van der Linde	(substituted in) 25'
LK	18	Bakkies Botha	(substituted in) 56'
N8	19	Bobby Skinstad	(substituted in) 71'
SH	20	Ruan Pienaar	(substituted in) 67'
FH	21	André Pretorius	(substituted in) 67'
WG	22	JP Pietersen	(substituted in) 53'
Coach:
(South Africa) Jake White

FB	15	Chris Wyles		(substituted off) 75'
RW	14	Takudzwa Ngwenya
OC	13	Philip Eloff
IC	12	Vahafolau Esikia
LW	11	Salesi Sika		(substituted off) 75'
FH	10	Mike Hercus (c)
SH	9	Chad Erskine		(substituted off) 75'
N8	8	Dan Payne				(substituted off) 75'
OF	7	Todd Clever	(yellow card) 24'	43' to 55'
BF	6	Louis Stanfill		(substituted off) 75'
RL	5	Mike Mangan
LL	4	Alec Parker
TP	3	Chris Osentowski
HK	2	Owen Lentz		(substituted off) 75'
LP	1	Mike MacDonald		(substituted off) 49'
Replacements:
HK	16	Blake Burdette		(substituted in) 75'
PR	17	Matekitonga Moeakiola		(substituted in) 49'
FL	18	Mark Aylor		(substituted in) 43'	(substituted off) 55'	(substituted in) 75'
N8	19	Henry Bloomfield		(substituted in) 75'
SH	20	Michael Petri		(substituted in) 75'
FH	21	Nese Malifa		(substituted in) 75'
CE	22	Thretton Palamo		(substituted in) 75'
Coach:
(New Zealand) Peter Thorburn

Man of the Match:
Schalk Burger (South Africa)

Touch judges:
Federico Cuesta (Argentina)
Paul Marks (Australia)
Television match official:
Malcolm Changleng (Scotland)
Fourth official:
Jonathan Kaplan (South Africa)
Fifth official:
Romain Poite (France)

Notes

- Takudzwa Ngwenya's try, which he scored from his own half after faking out Bryan Habana and running past him, was named the Try of the Year in international rugby by the International Rugby Players' Association, an award handed out at the 2007 IRB Awards.
- Thretton Palamo became the youngest player ever to appear in the Rugby World Cup, at age 19 years, 8 days. The previous record was held by Federico Méndez of Argentina, who appeared in the 1991 Rugby World Cup at 19 years, 54 days.
