= 2008 Pacific Islanders rugby union tour of Europe =

Summary
P	W	D	L
Total
3	1	0	2
Test match
3	1	0	2
Opponent
P	W	D	L
England
1	0	0	1
France
1	0	0	1
Italy
1	1	0	0

The 2008 Pacific Islanders rugby union tour of Europe was a series of test matches played by the Pacific Islanders team in England, France, and Italy during November 2008.

The team lost the first two test matches against England and France, but won the final test against Italy.

The head coach for the tour was former Tongan player Quddus Fielea, after Ilivasi Tabua withdrew from the tour. The captain for the tour was Fijian Mosese Rauluni while the vice-captain was Tongan Nili Latu.

== Squad ==
Note: Flags indicate national union under World Rugby eligibility rules. Players may hold more than one non-World Rugby nationality.

Player	Position	Union
Tani Fuga	Hooker	Samoa
Sunia Koto	Hooker	Fiji
Aleki Lutui	Hooker	Tonga
Tonga Leaʻaetoa	Prop	Tonga
Census Johnston	Prop	Samoa
Kas Lealamanua	Prop	Samoa
Kisi Pulu	Prop	Tonga
Justin Va'a	Prop	Samoa
Paino Hehea	Lock	Tonga
Kele Leawere	Lock	Fiji
Filipo Levi	Lock	Samoa
Hale T-Pole	Lock	Tonga
Nili Latu (vc)	Flanker	Tonga
Semisi Naevo	Flanker	Fiji
George Stowers	Flanker	Samoa
Viliami Vaki	Flanker	Tonga
Sisa Koyamaibole	Number 8	Fiji
Finau Maka	Number 8	Tonga

Player	Position	Union
Sililo Martens	Scrum-half	Tonga
Mosese Rauluni (c)	Scrum-half	Fiji
Seremaia Bai	Fly-half	Fiji
Pierre Hola	Fly-half	Tonga
Seilala Mapusua	Centre	Samoa
Seru Rabeni	Centre	Fiji
Epi Taione	Centre	Tonga
Vilimoni Delasau	Wing	Fiji
Napolioni Nalaga	Wing	Fiji
Sailosi Tagicakibau	Wing	Samoa
Kameli Ratuvou	Fullback	Fiji
Gavin Williams	Fullback	Samoa

Two further players were originally included in the squad Sireli Bobo and Soane Tongaʻuiha; Bobo later became unavailable, and Tongaʻuiha withdrew from the tour.

== Results ==
=== England ===
8 November 2008

England	39–13	Pacific Islanders
Tries: Sackey (2), Cipriani, Kennedy, Mears; Con: Cipriani (4); Pen: Cipriani (2)	Report	Tries: Rabeni; Con: Hola; Pen: Hola, Bai

Twickenham, London
Attendance: 55,427
Referee: Matt Goddard (Australia)

Team details

FB	15	Delon Armitage
RW	14	Paul Sackey
OC	13	Jamie Noon
IC	12	Riki Flutey
LW	11	Ugo Monye
FH	10	Danny Cipriani
SH	9	Danny Care
N8	8	Nick Easter
OF	7	Tom Rees
BF	6	Tom Croft
RL	5	Nick Kennedy
LL	4	Steve Borthwick
TP	3	Matt Stevens
HK	2	Lee Mears
LP	1	Andrew Sheridan
Substitutes:
PR	16	Dylan Hartley
HK	17	Phil Vickery
LK	18	Tom Palmer
FL	19	James Haskell
FL	20	Michael Lipman
SH	21	Harry Ellis
FH	22	Toby Flood

FB	15	Kameli Ratuvou
RW	14	Sailosi Tagicakibau
OC	13	Seru Rabeni
IC	12	Seilala Mapusua
LW	11	Vilimoni Delasau
FH	10	Pierre Hola
SH	9	Mosese Rauluni
N8	8	Finau Maka
OF	7	Nili Latu
BF	6	Semisi Naevo
RL	5	Kele Leawere
LL	4	Filipo Levi
TP	3	Census Johnston
HK	2	Aleki Lutui
LP	1	Justin Va'a
Substitutions:
HK	16	Sunia Koto
PR	17	Kisi Pulu
LK	18	Hale T-Pole
FL	19	George Stowers
SH	20	Sililo Martens
FH	21	Seremaia Bai
CE	22	Epi Taione

=== France ===
15 November 2008

France	42–17	Pacific Islanders
Tries:Tillous-Borde, Szarzewski, Heymans, Picamoles, Medard; Con: Skrela (4); Pen: Skrela (3)	Report	Tries:Taione; Pen: Bai (4)

Stade Auguste Bonal, Montbéliard
Attendance: 20,000
Referee: Nigel Owens (Wales)

Team details

FB	15	Maxime Médard
RW	14	Julien Malzieu
OC	13	Yannick Jauzion
IC	12	Benoit Baby
LW	11	Cédric Heymans
FH	10	David Skrela
SH	9	Jean-Baptiste Elissalde
N8	8	Imanol Harinordoquy
OF	7	Thierry Dusautoir
BF	6	Fulgence Ouedraogo
RL	5	Lionel Nallet
LL	4	Romain Millo-Chulski
TP	3	Nicolas Mas
HK	2	Dimitri Szarzewski
LP	1	Lionel Faure
Substitutes:
HK	16	Benjamin Kayser
PR	17	Benoit Lecouls
LK	18	Sébastien Chabal
N8	19	Louis Picamoles
SH	20	Sebastien Tillous-Borde
FH	21	Damien Traille
FB	22	Alexis Palisson

Pacific Islanders:
FB	15	Gavin Williams
RW	14	Napolini Vonowale-Nalaga
OC	13	Seru Rabeni
IC	12	Epi Taione
LW	11	Vilimoni Delasau
FH	10	Seremaia Bai
SH	9	Mosese Rauluni
N8	8	Nili Latu
OF	7	Sisa Koyamaibole
BF	6	Hale T-Pole
RL	5	Kele Leawere
LL	4	Paino Hehea
TP	3	Kisi Pulu
HK	2	Tani Fuga
LP	1	Kas Lealamanua
Substitutions:
HK	16	Sunia Koto
PR	17	Census Johnston
LK	18	Filipo Levi
FL	19	Viliami Vaki
SH	20	Sililo Martens
FB	21	Kameli Ratuvou
CE	22	Seilala Mapusua

=== Italy ===
22 November 2008

Italy	17–25	Pacific Islanders
Tries: Ghiraldini 16' c Mauro Bergamasco 65' c Con: Marcato (2); Pen: Marcato 6'	Report	Tries: Delasau 3' c, 29' m Ratuvou 40' c Con: Bai (2); Pen: Bai 18', 42'

Stadio Giglio, Reggio Emilia
Attendance: 13,595
Referee: Wayne Barnes (England)

Team details

Italy:
FB	15	Andrea Masi
RW	14	Kaine Robertson
OC	13	Mirco Bergamasco
IC	12	Gonzalo Garcia
LW	11	Matteo Pratichetti
FH	10	Andrea Marcato
SH	9	Pietro Travagli
N8	8	Sergio Parisse
OF	7	Mauro Bergamasco
BF	6	Josh Sole
RL	5	Marco Bortolami
LL	4	Tommaso Reato
TP	3	Carlos Nieto
HK	2	Leonardo Ghiraldini
LP	1	Matias Aguero
Substitutes:
HK	16	Fabio Ongaro
PR	17	Andrea Lo Cicero
PR	18	Salvatore Perugini
N8	19	Alessandro Zanni
SH	20	Pablo Canavosio
FB	21	Luke McLean
CT	22	Gilberto Pavan

Pacific Islanders:
FB	15	Kameli Ratuvou
RW	14	Sailosi Tagicakibau
OC	13	Seilala Mapusua
IC	12	Epi Taione
LW	11	Vilimoni Delasau
FH	10	Seremaia Bai
SH	9	Sililo Martens
N8	8	Sisa Koyamaibole
OF	7	Nili Latu
BF	6	Viliami Vaki
RL	5	Paino Hehea
LL	4	Filipo Levi
TP	3	Kisi Pulu
HK	2	Tani Fuga
LP	1	Justin Va'a
Substitutions:
HK	16	Sunia Koto
PR	17	Tonga Leaʻaetoa
FL	18	Semisi Naevo
LK	19	Hale T-Pole
CE	20	Seru Rabeni
FB	21	Gavin Williams
SH	22	Mosese Rauluni

== See also ==
- 2008 end-of-year rugby union tests
