= 2008 United States rugby union tour of Japan =

Summary
P	W	D	L
Total
2	0	0	2
Test match
2	0	0	2
Opponent
P	W	D	L
Japan
2	0	0	2

Tour chronology
- ← Ireland and Italy 2004 Europe 2010 →

The 2008 United States rugby union tour of Japan was a series of matches played in November 2008 in Japan by the United States national rugby union team.

== Results ==
16 November 2008

Japan	29–19	United States
Try: Endo, Holani; Con: Nicholas 2 Pen: Nicholas 4, Webb	report	Try: MacDonald, Ngwenya, Welch; Con: Hercus 2

Mizuho Stadium, Nagoya
Attendance: 5,111
Referee: Peter Fitzgibbon (Ireland)

Japan			United States
Kaoru Matsushita	FB	15	FB	Chris Wyles
Kosuke Endo	W	14	W	Taku Ngwenya
Koji Taira	C	13	C	Paul Emerick
Ryan Nicholas	C	12	C	Andrew Suniula
Koji Tomioka	W	11	W	Gavin DeBartolo
Shaun Webb	FH	10	FH	Mike Hercus
Fumiaki Tanaka	SH	9	SH	Mike Petri
(yellow card) Koliniasi Holani	N8	8	N8	Pat Quinn
(capt.) Takashi Kikutani	F	7	F	Todd Clever (capt.)
Hajime Kiso	F	6	F	Inaki Basauri
Toshizumi Kitagawa	L	5	L	Alec Parker
Luke Thompson	L	4	L	Hayden Smith
Kensuke Hatakeyama	P	3	P	Mate Moeakiola
Yusuke Aoki	H	2	H	Mark Crick
Hisateru Hirashima	P	1	P	Mike MacDonald
		Replacements
Naonori Mizuyama		16	H	Joe Welch (substituted on)
Naoki Kawamata		17	P	Shawn Pittman (substituted on)
(substituted on) Tomoaki Taniguchi	L	18	L	John van der Giessen (substituted on)
(substituted on) (yellow card) Michael Leitch	F	19	F	JJ Gagiano (substituted on)
Tomoki Yoshida		20	SH	Chad Erskine (substituted on)
Masakazu Irie		21	FH	Nese Malifa (substituted on)
Bryce Robins	C	22		Junior Sifa
		Coaches
(New Zealand) John Kirwan				Scott Johnson (Australia)

22 November 2008

Japan	32–17	United States
	Report	Try: Ngwenya, van der Giessen, Wyles; Con: Hercus

Chichibu, Tokyo
Attendance: 11,836
Referee: Peter Fitzgibbon (Ireland)

Japan			United States
Kaoru Matsushita	FB	15	FB	Chris Wyles
Kosuke Endo	W	14	W	Taku Ngwenya
(yellow card) Bryce Robins	C	13	C	Paul Emerick (yellow card)
Ryan Nicholas	C	12	C	Junior Sifa
Koji Tomioka	W	11	W	Gavin DeBartolo
Shaun Webb	FH	10	FH	Mike Hercus
Fumiaki Tanaka	SH	9	SH	Mike Petri
Koliniasi Holani	N8	8	N8	Pat Quinn
(capt.) Takashi Kikutani	F	7	F	Todd Clever (capt.)
Michael Leitch	F	6	F	Inaki Basauri
Toshizumi Kitagawa	L	5	L	Hayden Smith
Hitoshi Ono	L	4	L	John van der Giessen
Kensuke Hatakeyama	P	3	P	Brian Lemay
(yellow card) Yusuke Aoki	H	2	H	Mark Crick
Hisateru Hirashima	P	1	P	Mike MacDonald
		Replacements
(substituted on) Naonori Mizuyama	H	16	H	Joe Welch (substituted on)
(substituted on) Naoki Kawamata	P	17	P	Mate Moeakiola (substituted on)
(substituted on) Luke Thompson	L	18	L	Courtney McKay (substituted on)
(substituted on) Masato Toyoda	N8	19	N8	JJ Gagiano (substituted on)
(substituted on) Tomoki Yoshida	SH	20	SH	Chad Erskine (substituted on)
(substituted on) Masakazu Irie	C	21	FH	Thretton Palamo (substituted on)
(substituted on) Piei Mafileo	W	22	C	Nese Malifa (substituted on)
		Coaches
John Kirwan (New Zealand)				Scott Johnson (Australia)
