= 2004 United States rugby union tour of Ireland and Italy =

Summary
P	W	D	L
Total
2	0	0	2
Test match
2	0	0	2
Opponent
P	W	D	L
Ireland
1	0	0	1
Italy
1	0	0	1

Tour chronology
- ← Scotland and Wales 2000 Japan 2008 →

The 2004 United States rugby union tour was a series of matches played in Ireland and Italy 2004 in by United States national rugby union team.

== Results ==
20 November 2004

Ireland	55–6	United States
Try: Bowe, Horan; Miller, Murphy 2 Sheahan, Stringer; Con: Humphreys 7 Pen: Humphreys 2		Pen: Hercus 2

Lansdowne Road, Dublin
Attendance: 30,000
Referee: Robert Dickson (Scotland)

Ireland: 15.Geordan Murphy, 14.Shane Horgan, 13.Brian O'Driscoll (capt.), 12.Kevin Maggs, 11.Tommy Bowe, 10.David Humphreys, 9.Guy Easterby, 8.Eric Miller, 7.Denis Leamy, 6.Simon Easterby, 5.Paul O'Connell, 4.Donncha O'Callaghan, 3.John Hayes, 2.Frank Sheahan, 1.Marcus Horan, - replacements: 17.Simon Best, 18.Leo Cullen, 19.Anthony Foley, 20.Peter Stringer, 20.Peter Stringer, 22.Girvan Dempsey - No entry : 16.Shane Byrne, 21.Ronan O'Gara
United States: 15.Francois Viljoen, 14.Al Lakomskis, 13.Paul Emerick, 12.Salesi Sika, 11.David Fee, 10.Mike Hercus, 9.Mose Timoteo, 8.Kort Schubert (capt.), 7.Tony Petruzzella, 6.Brian Surgener, 5.Gerhard Klerck, 4.Alec Parker, 3.Jacob Waasdorp, 2.Matt Wyatt, 1.Mike MacDonald, - replacements: 19.Tasi Mo'unga, 20.David Williams, 22.Albert Tuipulotu - No entry: 16.Mike Hobson, 17.Chris Osentowski, 18.Jurie Gouws, 21.Matt Sherman

27 November 2004

Italy	43–25	United States
Try: Orquera, Pozzebon; Robertson 2, Stoica; Con: Orquera 3 Pen: Pens Orquera 3, Scanavacca		Try: Emerick, Fee; Tuipulotu; Con: Hercus 2 Pen: Hercus 2

Biella
Attendance: 8,000
Referee: Nigel Whitehouse (Wales)

Italy: 15.Roland de Marigny, 14.Kaine Robertson, 13.Walter Pozzebon, 12.Cristian Stoica, 11.Ludovico Nitoglia, 10.Luciano Orquera, 9.Paul Griffen, 8.Matteo Barbini, 7.Silvio Orlando, 6.Roberto Mandelli, 5.Valerio Bernabò, 4.Pietro Travagli, 3.Salvatore Perugini, 2.Fabio Ongaro (capt.), 1.Andrea Lo Cicero, - replacements: 17.Salvatore Costanzo, 18.Enrico Pavanello, 19.Antonio Mannato, 21.Andrea Scanavacca, 22.David dal Maso - No entry : 16.Giorgio Intoppa, 20.Cristian Bezzi
United States: 15.Francois Viljoen, 14.Al Lakomskis, 13.Paul Emerick, 12.Salesi Sika, 11.David Fee, 10.Mike Hercus, 9.Mose Timoteo, 8.Kort Schubert (capt.), 7.Brian Surgener, 6.Jurie Gouws, 5.Gerhard Klerck, 4.Alec Parker, 3.Jacob Waasdorp, 2.Matt Wyatt, 1.Mike MacDonald, - replacements: 17.Chris Osentowski, 19.Tasi Mo'unga, 20.David Williams, 22.Albert Tuipulotu - No entry: 16.Mike Hobson, 18.Matt Kane, 21.Matt Sherman
