= United States national rugby union team player statistics =

The following is a list of selected United States national rugby union team player statistics. For additional statistics, see the United States national rugby union team main page.

== Most caps ==
Rank	Player	Pos	Span	Caps	Starts
1	Todd Clever	Flanker	2003–2017	76	73
2	Cam Dolan	Number 8	2013–2023	67	58
2	Mike MacDonald	Prop	2000–2012	67	56
4	Luke Gross	Lock	1996–2003	62	61
5	Alec Parker	Lock	1996–2009	58	51
6	Mike Petri	Scrum-half	2007–2015	57	40
7	Louis Stanfill	Lock	2005–2015	56	45
8	Blaine Scully	Wing	2011–2019	54	50
8	Chris Wyles	Fullback	2007–2015	54	51
10	Paul Emerick	Center	2003–2012	53	49
10	Dave Hodges	Flanker	1996–2004	53	48

Last updated: November 26, 2025. Statistics include officially capped matches only.

== Most tries ==
Rank	Player	Pos	Span	Mat	Tries
1	Vaea Anitoni	Wing	1992–2000	46	26
2	Joe Taufete'e	Hooker	2015–	38	23
3	Cam Dolan	Number 8	2013–2023	67	21
4	Paul Emerick	Center	2003–2012	53	17
5	Todd Clever	Flanker	2003–2017	76	16
5	Mike Te'o	Fullback	2016–2021	30	16
5	Chris Wyles	Fullback	2007–2015	54	16
8	Nate Augspurger	Wing	2016–2025	51	15
8	Blaine Scully	FB / Wing	2011–2019	54	15
10	Hanco Germishuys	Flanker	2016–2022	29	14

Last updated: September 19, 2026. Statistics include officially capped matches only.

== Most points ==
Rank	Player	Pos	Span	Mat	Points
1	Mike Hercus	Fly-half	2002–2009	48	465
2	AJ MacGinty	Fly-half	2015–	43	425
3	Matt Alexander	Fly-half	1995–1998	24	286
4	Chris Wyles	Fullback	2007–2015	54	222
5	Luke Carty	Fly-half	2021–	31	152
6	Chris O'Brien	Fly-half	1988–1994	20	144
7	Mark Williams	Center	1987–1999	37	143
8	Vaea Anitoni	Wing	1992–2000	46	130
9	Joe Taufete'e	Hooker	2015–	38	115
10	Kevin Dalzell	Scrumhalf	1996–2003	42	109

Last updated: September 19, 2026. Statistics include officially capped matches only.

== Most matches as captain ==
Rank	Player	Position	Span	Mat	Won	Lost	Draw	%
1	Todd Clever	Flanker	2008–2017	51	20	29	2	39.22%
2	Dave Hodges	Flanker	2000–2003	28	9	19	0	32.14%
3	Dan Lyle	Number 8	1996–2003	24	11	13	0	45.83%
4	Blaine Scully	Full Back	2016–2019	23	14	9	0	60.87%
5	Kort Schubert	Number 8	2003–2006	17	4	13	0	23.53%
6	Tom Billups	Hooker	1998	12	4	8	0	33.33%
7	Greg Peterson	Lock	2023–2024	10	5	5	0	50%
8	Ed Burlingham	Lock	1983–1987	9	3	5	1	33.33%
9	Kevin Swords	Lock	1991–1994	8	1	7	0	12.5%
9	Brian Vizard	Number 8	1990–1991	8	3	5	0	37.5%
9	Chris Wyles	Full Back	2015	8	3	5	0	37.5%

Last updated: Spain vs United States, 23 November 2024. Statistics include officially capped matches only.

== Youngest players ==
#	Player	Pos	Age	Opposition	Venue	Date
1	Titi Lamositele	Prop	18 years and 187 days	Canada	(United States) Charleston	17/08/2013
2	David Ainu'u	Prop	18 years and 355 days	Samoa	(Spain) San Sebastian	10/11/2018
3	Thretton Palamo	Wing	19 years and 8 days	South Africa	(France) Montpellier	30/09/2007
4	Dominic Besag	Centre	19 years and 13 days	Georgia	(Georgia (country)) Tbilisi	19/08/2023
5	Lorenzo Thomas	Centre	19 years and 29 days	Chile	(United States) Fort Lauderdale	20/02/2016
6	Deion Mikesell	Wing	19 years and 58 days	Uruguay	(Uruguay) Montevideo	05/03/2016
7	Ruben de Haas	Scrum-half	19 years and 131 days	Chile	(United States) Fullerton	17/02/2018
8	Kapeli Pifeleti	Prop	19 years and 175 days	Brazil	(United States) Austin	23/02/2019
9	Hanco Germishuys	Flanker	19 years and 187 days	Brazil	(Brazil) Sao Paulo	27/02/2016
10	Mike MacDonald	Prop	19 years and 216 days	Fiji	(Samoa) Apia	30/06/2000

Last updated: United States vs Tonga, 16 November 2024. Statistics include officially capped matches only.

Source: ESPN Scrum

== Oldest players ==
#	Player	Pos	Age	Opposition	Venue	Date
1.	Mark Williams	Fly-half	38 years and 98 days	Ireland	(Republic of Ireland) Lansdowne Road	02/10/1999
2.	Bill LeClerc	Prop	37 years and 279 days	Samoa	(Samoa) Apia	26/06/1999
3.	Fred Paoli	Prop	37 years and 229 days	Italy	(England) Otley	05/10/1991
4.	Saia Uhila	Lock	37 years and 161 days	Scotland	(United States) Washington D.C.	07/12/2024
5.	Mate Moeakiola	Prop	37 years and 144 days	South Africa	(England) London	07/10/2015
6.	Lance Manga	Prop	35 years and 329 days	Canada	(United States) Denver	13/06/1992
7.	Dave Hodges	Lock	35 years and 292 days	France	(United States) Hartford	03/07/2004
8.	Mose Timoteo	Scrum-half	35 years and 290 days	Italy	(United States) Houston	23/06/2012
9.	Graham Downes	Prop	35 years and 276 days	Hong Kong	(United States) San Francisco	18/04/1992
10.	Lin Walton	Wing	35 years and 254 days	South Africa	(United States) Glenville	25/09/1981

Last updated: Portugal vs United States, 9 November 2024. Statistics include officially capped matches only.

Source: ESPN Scrum

== Most points in a match ==
#	Player	Pos	Pts	Tries	Conv	Pens	Drop	Opposition	Venue	Date
1.	Chris O'Brien	Fly-half	26	3	7	0	0	Uruguay	(Uruguay) Montevideo	05/11/1989
1.	Mike Hercus	Fly-half	26	1	3	4	1	Russia	(Japan) Tokyo	30/05/2004
1.	Mike Hercus	Fly-half	26	0	13	0	0	Barbados	(United States) Santa Clara	01/07/2006
4.	Chris O'Brien	Fly-half	25	2	6	1	0	Bermuda	(Bermuda) Hamilton	12/03/1994
4.	AJ MacGinty	Fly-half	25	3	5	0	0	Chile	(Chile) Maipù	02/02/2019
6.	Matt Alexander	Fly-half	24	1	8	1	0	Japan	(United States) San Francisco	06/07/1996
7.	Chris Wyles	Fullback	23	1	3	4	0	Canada	(United States) Sacramento	21/06/2014
8.	Matt Alexander	Fly-half	22	1	4	3	0	Hong Kong	(United States) San Francisco	29/06/1996
8.	Mike Hercus	Fly-half	22	0	5	4	0	Spain	(Spain) Madrid	12/04/2003
10.	AJ MacGinty	Fly-half	21	1	5	2	0	Germany	(Germany) Wiesbaden	18/11/2017

Last updated: Portugal vs United States, 9 November 2024. Statistics include officially capped matches only.

Source: ESPN Scrum

== Most tries in a match ==
#	Player	Pos	Pts	Tries	Conv	Pens	Drop	Opposition	Venue	Date
1.	Richard Hyland	Wing	12	4	0	0	0	Romania	(France) Colombes	11/05/1924
1.	Vaea Anitoni	Wing	20	4	0	0	0	Japan	(United States) San Francisco	06/07/1996
1.	Brian Hightower	Wing	20	4	0	0	0	Japan	(United States) San Francisco	07/06/1997
1.	Vaea Anitoni	Wing	20	4	0	0	0	Portugal	(Portugal) Lisbon	08/04/1998
5.	15 players on 3 tries									

Last updated: Portugal vs United States, 9 November 2024. Statistics include officially capped matches only.
