= List of foreign international rugby union players in Japan =

This is a list of men's foreign international Test-capped players that play or have played in the Top League/Japan Rugby League One. In this list are included the foreign players that play or have played in the Japanese professional rugby union system (since 2003).

In a 2025 paper published by the Nagoya Gakuin University Research Institute of Nagoya Gakuin University examining the composition and dynamics of international migrant players (MPs) in the Japan Rugby League One, with a focus on the league's evolving international player base and the challenges shaping Japanese rugby, it was found that of the 407 registered players in the top eight teams during the 2022–23 Division 1 season (Saitama Wild Knights, Tokyo Sungoliath, Kubota Spears, Toshiba Brave Lupus, Toyota Verblitz, Yokohama Canon Eagles, Kobe Steelers, Shizuoka Blue Revs), 29.5% (120) were foreign, with 38.3% (46) of that cohort being internationally-capped.

Some of the most prominent and successful players have played in the Top League/Japan Rugby League One, including multiple Rugby World Cup winners Dan Carter, Jerome Kaino, Ma'a Nonu, Damian de Allende, Faf de Klerk, and Pieter-Steph du Toit. Due to the league's foreign player quota, these players have often been marquee signings, and are frequently ranked among the highest-paid players in the world.

== List ==
=== Argentina ===
- Santiago González Iglesias
- Pablo Matera
- Nicolás Sánchez
- Tomás Vallejos

=== Australia ===
- Adam Ashley-Cooper
- Berrick Barnes
- Matt Cockbain
- Quade Cooper
- Nick Cummins
- Bernard Foley
- Will Genia
- Mark Gerrard
- Liam Gill
- Matt Giteau
- George Gregan
- Nathan Grey
- Daniel Heenan
- Digby Ioane
- Toutai Kefu
- Samu Kerevi
- Marika Koroibete
- Stephen Larkham
- Ben McCalman
- Sean McMahon
- Isi Naisarani
- Mark Nawaqanitawase
- Hunter Paisami
- Wycliff Palu
- Jordan Petaia
- David Pocock
- Joe Roff
- Paddy Ryan
- George Smith
- Sam Talakai

=== Canada ===
- Colin Yukes

=== England ===
- Freddie Burns
- Riki Flutey
- James Haskell
- George Kruis
- Joe Launchbury
- Geoff Parling

=== Fiji ===
- Seremaia Bai
- Sireli Bobo
- Tevita Ikanivere
- Kele Leawere
- Viliame Mata
- Nemani Nadolo
- Semi Radradra
- Waisale Serevi
- Seta Tamanivalu (Note: Tamanivalu made five Test caps for New Zealand at the time of his first JRLO game. He subsequently switched allegiance to Fiji during his tenure in Japan.)
- Marika Vunibaka

=== Ireland ===
- Billy Burns
- James Lowe

=== Italy ===
- Dino Lamb

=== New Zealand ===
- Beauden Barrett
- Steven Bates
- George Bridge
- Tony Brown
- Sam Cane
- Dan Carter
- Jerry Collins
- Ryan Crotty
- Aaron Cruden
- Stephen Donald
- Samipeni Finau
- Shannon Frizell
- Rico Gear
- David Havili
- Jackson Hemopo
- David Hill
- Richard Kahui
- Jerome Kaino
- Anton Lienert-Brown
- Leon MacDonald
- Damian McKenzie
- Richie Mo'unga
- Ma'a Nonu
- TJ Perenara
- Stephen Perofeta
- Kieran Read
- Brodie Retallick
- Ardie Savea
- Colin Slade
- Aaron Smith
- Ben Smith
- Shaun Stevenson
- Tom Taylor
- Mark Tele'a
- Patrick Tuipulotu
- Reuben Thorne
- Matt Todd
- Brad Weber
- Sam Whitelock
- Sonny Bill Williams

=== Samoa ===
- Seilala Mapusua
- Semo Sititi
- Alesana Tuilagi

=== Scotland ===
- Blair Cowan
- Jack Dempsey (Note: Dempsey made 14 Test caps for Australia before swapping international allegiance to Scotland. Dempsey's international allegiance was aligned with Scotland at the time of his first JRLO game.)
- Richie Gray
- Nick Grigg
- Greig Laidlaw

=== South Africa ===
- Damian de Allende
- Kurt-Lee Arendse
- Lukhanyo Am
- Andries Bekker
- Thinus Delport
- Eben Etzebeth
- Aphelele Fassi
- Jacque Fourie
- Lood de Jager
- Faf de Klerk
- Jesse Kriel
- Cheslin Kolbe
- Manie Libbok
- Malcolm Marx
- Franco Mostert
- Ruan Nortjé
- Wynand Olivier
- JP Pietersen
- Fourie du Preez
- Danie Rossouw
- Willie le Roux
- Kwagga Smith
- François Steyn
- Pieter-Steph du Toit
- Jaco van der Westhuyzen
- Jasper Wiese
- Grant Williams

=== Tonga ===
- Pierre Hola
- Sione Kalamafoni
- Nili Latu
- Finau Maka
- Charles Piutau (Note: Before playing in the JRLO, Piutau had made 17 Test caps for New Zealand, before switching allegiance to Tonga.)
- Viliami Tahituʻa
- Epi Taione
- Sonatane Takulua
- Hale T-Pole
- Sione Tuʻipulotu
- Israel Folau (Note: Folau swtiched international allegiance to Tonga in 2022. He had previously made 73 Test caps for Australia. For the majority of his tenure in Japan, Folau was internationally-capped for Tonga.)

=== United States ===
- Todd Clever
- Mike Hercus

=== Wales ===
- Jake Ball
- Cory Hill
- Hadleigh Parkes
- Shane Williams

== Bibliography ==
- Hayasaka, Kazunari (2025). "日本ラグビーにおける国際移籍選手の構造分析：Japan Rugby League One 2022–2023シーズンにおける選手構成と制度的課題" [Structural Analysis of Migration Players in Japanese Rugby: Player Composition and Institutional Challenges in the 2022–2023 Season of Japan Rugby League One]. Nagoya Gakuin University Journal (in Japanese). 14 (1). Nagoya Gakuin University.
