= Saulala =

Saulala is a surname. Notable people with the surname include:

- Alatini Saulala (born 1967), Tongan rugby player
- Sione Sangster Saulala (born 1974), Tongan politician
