= Isileli =

Isileli is a given name. Notable people with the given name include:

- Isileli Nakajima (born 1989), Tongan-born Japanese rugby union player
- ‘Isileli Pulu (born 1957), Tongan politician
- Isileli Tupou (born 1984), Tongan rugby union player
