= Hufanga =

Hufanga is a surname. Notable people with the surname include:

- Mele Hufanga (born 1994), New Zealand rugby player
- Suka Hufanga (born 1982), Tongan rugby player
- Talanoa Hufanga (born 2000), American football player
