= Vahafolau =

Vahafolau is both a surname and a given name. Notable people with the name include:

- Samiu Vahafolau (born 1978), Tongan rugby union player
- Vahafolau Esikia (born 1979), American rugby union player
