= Mike Mangan (rugby union) =

US international rugby union player

- Born: Michael T. Mangan; 3 November 1975 (age 51) Chicago, Illinois, U.S.

Rugby union career
- Position: Number 8
International career
| Years | Team | Apps | (Points) |
| 2005–2007 | United States | 17 | (0) |
- Correct as of 31 December 2020

Mike Mangan (born November 3, 1975) is a former American rugby union lock. He was a member of the United States national rugby union team that participated in the 2007 Rugby World Cup.
