= Muliufi Salanoa =

- Born: August 15, 1980 (age 46)
- Height: 1.78 m (5 ft 10 in)
- Weight: 105 kg (231 lb; 16.5 st)

Rugby union career
- Position: Prop
International career
Years	Team	Apps	(Points)
2005-2007	Samoa	10	(0)

Muliufi Salanoa (born 16 August 1980 in Vaivase) is a Samoan rugby union prop. He is a member of the Samoa national rugby union team and participated with the squad at the 2007 Rugby World Cup.
