= Mark Aylor =

American rugby union flanker

- Born: November 1, 1978 (age 48) San Angelo, Texas, United States
- Height: 1.93 m (6 ft 4 in)
- Weight: 112 kg (247 lb)

Rugby union career
- Position(s): Flanker, Lock
Senior career
Years	Team	Apps	(Points)
- Denver Barbarians
International career
Years	Team	Apps	(Points)
2006–2008	United States	11	(0)
- Correct as of 31 December 2020

Mark Aylor (born January 11, 1978, in Santa Clara, California) is a former American rugby union flanker. He was a member of the United States national rugby union team that participated in the 2007 Rugby World Cup.

Aylor now works as a chiropractor for POWER: Advanced Chiropractic Health Center.
