= Henry Bloomfield (rugby union) =

US international rugby union player

- Born: January 4, 1973 (age 53) Los Angeles, California, United States
- Height: 1.9 m (6 ft 3 in)
- Weight: 129 kg (284 lb)

Rugby union career
- Position: Number 8
International career
| Years | Team | Apps | (Points) |
| 2007–2008 | United States | 3 | (0) |
- Correct as of 31 December 2020

Henry Bloomfield (born January 4, 1973) is a former American rugby union number eight. He was a member of the United States national rugby union team that participated in the 2007 Rugby World Cup.
