= Elvis Seveali'i =

Samoa international rugby union player

- Born: Elvis Seveali'i; 20 June 1978 (age 48) Wellington, New Zealand
- Height: 1.79 m (5 ft 10 in)
- Weight: 92 kg (14 st 7 lb)

Rugby union career
- Position: Centre/Wing/Fly half
Senior career
| Years | Team | Apps | (Points) |
| -2002 | Wellington | | |
| 2002-2003 | Bath | 7 | (25) |
| 2003-2005 | Ospreys | 42 | (25) |
| 2005-2008 | Sale | 38 | (20) |
| 2008-2011 | London Irish | 79 | (55) |
| 2011-2012 | Bourgoin | 15 | (0) |
| 2012-2013 | Rovigo | 6 | (0) |
International career
| Years | Team | Apps | (Points) |
| 2000-2007 | Samoa | 22 | (45) |

Elvis Lulai Seveali'i (born 20 June 1978 in Wellington, New Zealand) is a retired Samoan rugby union footballer. He played centre and wing and represented Manu Samoa internationally.

He has represented Wellington in the under-19s and under-21s as well as the National Provincial Championship team.

Seveali'i has represented Wellington in the under-19s and under-21s as well as the National Provincial Championship team. He played for Bath during the 2002–03 English rugby season. He made his Heineken Cup debut on 13 April 2003, scoring twice against the Saracens. At the end of the season he scored a try against London Irish in the dying seconds that literally avoided Bath relegation. He spent the following two seasons with the Neath-Swansea Ospreys. He signed with the Sale Sharks during which he played at centre and won the 2005-06 Guinness Premiership. He has since has moved to the Guinness Premiership side London Irish. In September 2010 he was banned for two weeks for a dangerous tackle. In 2011 he considered leaving London Irish at the end of the season. He subsequently joined Bourgoin in France, before finally playing for Rovigo in Italy. He retired in 2013.

In 2018 he became head coach for California Women's Rugby.
