= Alatini Saulala =

Tonga & US international rugby union player

- Born: September 22, 1968 (age 58) Vavau, Tonga
- Height: 1.82 m (6 ft 0 in)
- Weight: 97 kg (214 lb)
- University: BYU Idaho
- Notable relative: Vaha Esikia (USA National Rugby Player)

Rugby union career
- Position: Center
International career
Years	Team	Apps	(Points)
1991	Tonga	2	(0)
1997–2000	United States	20	(30)
- Correct as of 5 September 2021
National sevens team
Years	Team		Comps
1998–1999	United States		12
Coaching career
- Years: Team
- 2006-Present: San Mateo Rugby Club

Alatini Saulala (born 22 September 1967), was born in Tonga and educated at Brigham Young University–Idaho. He is 1.82m tall and weighs 97 kg, as described by Sports Illustrated: [this] "California player is an explosive runner". Saulala currently coaches the San Mateo rugby union team. He now coaches for a local rugby team in Morgan Hill, California.

In October 2021 he was inducted into the US Rugby Foundation's hall of fame.

Saulala is a member of the Church of Jesus Christ of Latter-day Saints. He has two sons, and four daughters. He now earns a living as a licensed contractor in the San Jose area.
