= Francois Viljoen =

US international rugby union player

- Born: May 16, 1981 (age 45) Oakland, California, U.S.
- Height: 6 ft 0 in (1.83 m)
- Weight: 189 lb (86 kg)

Rugby union career
- Position: Fullback
Amateur team(s)
Years	Team	Apps	(Points)
- Belmont Shore RFC
International career
Years	Team	Apps	(Points)
2004–2007	United States	18	(69)
- Correct as of 31 December 2020

Francois Viljoen (born May 16, 1981) is a former American rugby union fullback. He was a member of the United States national rugby union team that participated in the 2007 Rugby World Cup.
