= Hayden Mexted =

American rugby union lock

- Born: March 10, 1979 (age 47) Whakatāne, New Zealand
- Height: 6 ft 5 in (1.96 m)
- Weight: 265 lb (120 kg; 18 st 13 lb)

Rugby union career
- Position: Lock
International career
Years	Team	Apps	(Points)
2004–2007	United States	8	(0)

Hayden Mexted (born 10 March 1979 in Whakatāne) is a former New Zealand-born American rugby union lock. He was a member of the United States national rugby union team that participated in the 2007 Rugby World Cup. He is a distant cousin of Murray Mexted. He was also capable of playing number 8, much like his cousin.
