= Joseph Wilson Vaka =

Joseph Vaka
- Born: Joseph Wilson Vaka; November 21, 1980 (age 45) Kolofo'ou, Tonga
- Height: 1.86 m (6 ft 1 in)
- Weight: 113 kg (249 lb)

Rugby union career
- Position(s): Centre, Wing
Amateur team(s)
| Years | Team | Apps | (Points) |
| 2007-2008 | Havelock Sports Club | | |
Senior career
| Years | Team | Apps | (Points) |
| 2006–2009 | World Fighting Bull | | |
| 2010– | Toyota Shokki Shuttles | 50 | (70) |
- Correct as of 15 January 2017
International career
| Years | Team | Apps | (Points) |
| 2005-2012 | Tonga | 36 | (40) |
National sevens team
| Years | Team | | Comps |
| 2003-2005 | Tonga 7s | | World Series |

Joseph Wilson Vaka (born 21 November 1980) in Kolofo'ou, Tonga) is rugby union footballer. He plays at outside centre or wing. He played for Havelock Sports Club in Sri Lanka in 2007 before moving to Japan. He was with the World Fighting Bulls in Kobe, Hyogo before he came to Toyota Shokki Shuttles in Kariya, Aichi where he currently resides.

In 2007 Vaka was cautioned by UK police after assaulting a fan at Heathrow airport.

== Personal life ==
Vaka is a member of the Church of Jesus Christ of Latter-day Saints.
