= Chris O'Brien (rugby union) =

American rugby union player and coach

Christopher O'Brien
- Born: August 5, 1964 (age 62) Palo Alto, California
- Occupation(s): Rugby player, Coach

Rugby union career
- Position(s): Fly-half, Centre
International career
Years	Team	Apps	(Points)
1988–1994	United States	20	(144)

Christopher Patrick O'Brien (born August 5, 1964) is an American retired rugby union player who played at fly-half and centre and later served as an assistant coach for the United States national rugby union team.

== Early life and career ==
O'Brien was born in Palo Alto (CA), United States on August 5, 1964.

He made his debut for the United States national rugby union team on June 11, 1988.

He made a total of 22 official appearances for the USA Eagles, including two games at the 1991 Rugby World Cup and one game for the 1995 Rugby World Cup Qualifier.

O'Brien is fifth on the USA Eagles' list of all-time leading scorers with 144 points.

He served as the kicking coach for the USA Eagles in 2015.

== See also ==
- United States national rugby union team
