= Justin Purdie =

- Born: Justin Evan Perelini Purdie; 30 May 1981 (age 45) Wellington, New Zealand
- Height: 6 ft 4 in (1.93 m)
- Weight: 235 lb (107 kg)
- University: Victoria University of Wellington

Rugby union career
- Position: Flanker
Senior career
Years	Team	Apps	(Points)
2005	Wellington		
2008	Dax	9	(0)
2010	Lannemezan	12	(0)
2010–2012	Bourg-en-Bresse	24	(0)
2012–2013	Montélimar		
2013–2014	Annecy	5	(0)
International career
Years	Team	Apps	(Points)
2007	Samoa	8	(0)

Justin Evan Perelini Purdie (born 13 May 1980 in Wellington, New Zealand) is a New Zealand rugby union player of Samoan origin. He played one match for Wellington in 2005 when the team found itself needing forwards. He plays at flanker and won 8 caps for the Samoa national rugby union team and represented them at the 2007 Rugby World Cup.
