= Jerry Meafou =

- Born: April 22, 1982 (age 44) Saleimoa, Upolu
- Height: 5 ft 11 in (1.80 m)
- Weight: 204 lb (93 kg)

Rugby union career
- Position: Centre
International career
Years	Team	Apps	(Points)
2007-2008	Samoa	4	(0)

Jerry Meafou (born 22 April 1982 in Saleimoa) is a Samoan rugby union centre. He is a member of the Samoa national rugby union team and participated with the squad at the 2007 Rugby World Cup.
