= Suka Hufanga =

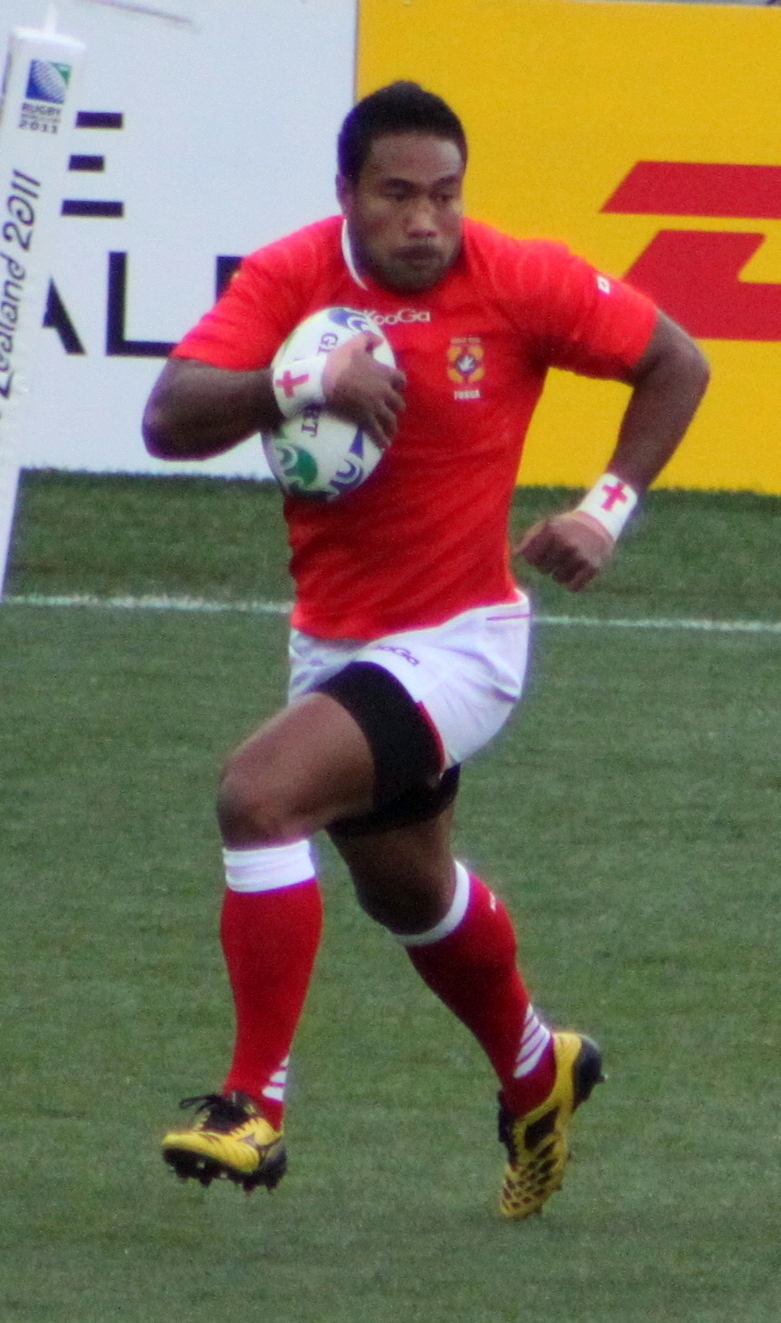
- Born: Sukanaivalu Ikavuka Hufanga; June 18, 1982 (age 44) Houma, Tonga
- Height: 5 ft 11 in (1.80 m)
- Weight: 193 lb (88 kg)

Rugby union career
- Position: Centre/Wing
Senior career
Years	Team	Apps	(Points)
2004-2005	FC Grenoble	17	(15)
2005-2006	AS Béziers Hérault	3	(0)
2006-2009	CA Brive	49	(45)
2009-2010	Le Bugue	12	(20)
2011-2014	Newcastle Falcons	13	(5)
International career
Years	Team	Apps	(Points)
2003-2012	Tonga	30	(25)

Sukanaivalu Ivakuva Hufanga, known as Suka Hufanga (born 18 June 1982 in Vaini), is a Tongan rugby union footballer. He plays as a centre.

== Career ==
He played for CA Brive in the French Top 14, from 2006/07 to 2008/09. He plays for Newcastle Falcons in the English Premiership, since 2009/10.

The Tongan centre has 30 caps for his National Team, with 5 tries scored, 25 points in aggregate.

Hufanga has been in the Tongan squad since 2003. He was selected both for the 2003 Rugby World Cup finals, where he played three matches, and the 2007 Rugby World Cup finals, playing all the four matches. Hufanga scored two tries in the narrow losses to South Africa (25-30) and England (20-36).

He was also chosen for the 2011 Rugby World Cup, playing in four games and he scored a try in Tonga's historic win over France.
