= Isileli Tupou =

- Born: Isileli Matakaiongo Tupou; October 26, 1984 (age 42) Tofua, Tonga
- Height: 1.81 m (5 ft 11 in)
- Weight: 96 kg (212 lb; 15 st 2 lb)
- School: Tonga College Atele
- University: Hanazono University

Rugby union career
- Position: Inside center
Senior career
Years	Team	Apps	(Points)
2008-2009	FC Auch Gers	20	(0)
2009-2013	Lille Métropole	70	(20)
International career
Years	Team	Apps	(Points)
2006 - 2010	Tonga	26	(10)

Isileli Tupou also known as Kaiongo Tupou (born 26 October 1984) in Tofua, Tonga) is a rugby union player who plays at center. He currently plays with the Lille Métropole Rugby in the Federale 1 in France.
