= Blake Burdette =

US international rugby union player (born 1980)

- Born: 19 January 1980 (age 46) Minneapolis, United States
- Height: 1.85 m (6 ft 1 in)
- Weight: 116 kg (256 lb; 18 st 4 lb)

Rugby union career
- Position: Hooker
Amateur team(s)
Years	Team	Apps	(Points)
2002-2005	Utah Utes		
2006-2007	NYAC		
Senior career
Years	Team	Apps	(Points)
2007	Leicester Tigers	0	(0)
2019	Utah Warriors	4	(0)
- Correct as of 31 December 2020
International career
Years	Team	Apps	(Points)
2006–2007	United States	9	(0)
- Correct as of 31 December 2020
Coaching career
- Years: Team
- 2008–2013: Utah Warriors
- 2015–2017: Penn State University
- 2018–2019: Rugby Utah Selects

Blake Burdette (born January 19, 1980, in Minneapolis) is a rugby coach and former American rugby union hooker or prop. He was a member of the United States national rugby union team and made his international debut in 2006 against Uruguay. Burdette played for the USA Eagles in the 2007 Rugby World Cup. Currently, he has returned to playing professionally with Utah Warriors having come out of retirement aged 39, 12 years after previous professional rugby playing experience.

In 2002, Burdette played as a University of Utah football walk-on. In his senior year, Burdette was nicknamed the 'Utah Man' on the campus' football team. Burdette played every game in the 2004 season for the Utah Utes football team, and played for the Utes as an 4x All-American rugby player (2003–2006), before dedicating his time to playing professional rugby in England. His England rugby career lasted only one season due to injury.

== Coaching ==
In 2007, Burdette joined the Utah Utes rugby team as assistant coach, taking over as head coach in 2009, but resigned due to an incident involving alcohol and assault of a trainer.

In 2015, Burdette was hired as head coach of The Pennsylvania State University's Men's Rugby Team. Burdette is the first full-time, university employed head coach in the history of PSU rugby. Unfortunately this didn’t last long he was ousted in January of 2017 despite being 12-0.{{}}
