= Thretton Palamo =

US international rugby union player (born 1988)

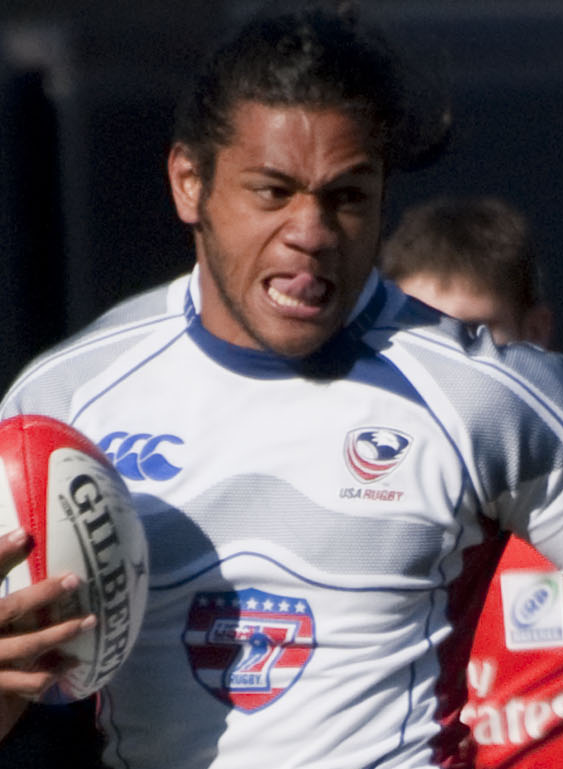
- Born: September 22, 1988 (age 38) Woodland, California, U.S.
- Height: 6 ft 3 in (1.91 m)
- Weight: 255 lb (18 st 3 lb; 116 kg)
- Notable relative: Arona Palamo (father)

Rugby union career
- Position: Centre
Senior career
Years	Team	Apps	(Points)
2008–2009	Biarritz	0	(0)
2014–2016	Saracens	3	(0)
2015–2016	→ London Welsh (loan)	5	(0)
2016–2018	Bristol	12	(5)
2017	→ Dragons (loan)	2	(0)
2019–2023	Old Glory DC	38	(30)
2019	→ Houston SaberCats (loan)	7	(15)
- Correct as of 7 July 2025
International career
Years	Team	Apps	(Points)
2005–2007	Samoa U19	8	(5)
2008	United States U20	5	(10)
2007–2019	United States	19	(0)
- Correct as of 31 March 2020
National sevens team
Years	Team		Comps
2008–	United States		19 (40)

Thretton Palamo (born September 22, 1988) is an American rugby union player who plays centre for Old Glory DC of Major League Rugby (MLR).

When he appeared in the 2007 Rugby World Cup, he became the youngest ever player to have played in the Rugby World Cup, a record that was surpassed in 2015 by Vasil Lobzhanidze of Georgia.

== Youth and early career ==
Palamo was born in Woodland, California. Palamo is a graduate of Davis Senior High School in Davis, California. During his high school career he played both basketball, winning selection to the USA's U16 national team, and American football, leading his team in rushing yards and tackles during his senior year. He didn't officially start playing rugby until he was 16 when he joined the same club as his brothers, the San Francisco Golden Gate Rugby Club.

Within six months of joining SFGG, Palamo was called to represent Samoa at U19 level and also went on to play Sevens for Samoa, the country of his father's birth. However, as he approached 18 — the age deadline to commit to a specific national team — he decided to play for his own country of birth, the United States, saying this could create opportunities for other Samoan players.

== University of Utah ==
With a recommendation from USA Rugby World Cup teammate and Utah's head rugby coach Blake Burdette, Palamo went to Utah and played rugby union and American football for the Utes. He spent his freshman year just playing rugby. In June 2010, he led the Utes to victory in the inaugural Collegiate Rugby Championship, scoring two tries in a 31–26 overtime win over the California Golden Bears. A desire to play American football and some help from Burdette, a former Utes tight end, saw Palamo join the Utes American football program in early 2011, taking part in spring scrimmages as a running back.

== Club career ==
He played in France for Top 14 club Biarritz during the 2008-09 season and played alongside fellow Eagles international Takudzwa Ngwenya. Despite signing a three-year contract with Biarritz, he returned to the United States at the end of his first season to continue his studies.

Palamo returned to professional club rugby in 2014, signing a three-month trial contract with Saracens for the 2014–15 season. Palamo made his professional rugby debut playing 55 minutes for Saracens in a win over Ospreys in LV= Cup. After making three appearances for Saracens, Palamo joined London Welsh on a year long loan for the 2015-16 RFU Championship season. However, on 31 December 2015, Palamo left London Welsh by early release to fully return to the United States Sevens set-up.

On 27 June 2016 it was confirmed that Palamo would return to England to join Bristol ahead of their return to the Premiership in 2016. In September 2017 he joined the Dragons on a short-term loan to cover injuries.

He was released by Bristol in April 2018.

He joined Major League Rugby team Houston Sabercats in 2019. In 2020, he signed with expansion team Old Glory DC. He was co-captain of the team in their first two professional seasons, alongside flanker Mungo Mason. He re-signed with the team for the 2021 and 2022 seasons.

== International career ==
Palamo was called into the United States squad to participate at the 2007 Rugby World Cup. He played his only match of the tournament in the 15–64 loss to South Africa on 30 September 2007. The appearance was just eight days after his 19th birthday and made him the youngest player in Rugby World Cup history, lowering the record of Federico Méndez of Argentina, who was 19 years and 63 days when he appeared at the 1991 Rugby World Cup. As noted earlier, that record was surpassed in 2015 by Lobzhanidze, who played for Georgia against Tonga less than a month before his 19th birthday.

Palamo made his only other full test appearance for the Eagles in a tour match against Japan in Tokyo on 22 November 2008 before going on to captain the USA's Sevens team at the 2009 World Games in Taiwan.

Palamo returned to international rugby starting at inside centre for the US in their 2014 IRB Pacific Nations Cup match against Canada.

== Coaching career ==
Following his playing career Palamo focused on coaching at the club and University level. He is currently an assistant coach for the Navy Women's Rugby team, a varsity sport at the United States Naval Academy.

== Family ==
Palamo's father, Arona Palamo, played international rugby union at centre and flyhalf for Samoa between 1979 and 1982 before moving to San Francisco to take up an academic scholarship at UC Davis. Palamo has one younger sister and two older brothers, Toshi and Seta, who have both played Sevens for the United States. His father introduced him to rugby union and he was influenced to play the sport after watching his brothers play.
