= Tani Fuga =

Samoan rugby union player

- Born: Tanielu Fuga; July 14, 1973 (age 53) Samoa
- Height: 5 ft 11 in (1.80 m)
- Weight: 16 st 3 lb (103 kg)

Rugby union career
- Position: Hooker
- Current team: Harlequins
Senior career
| Years | Team | Apps | (Points) |
| 2000 - 2010; | Harlequins | 182 | (100) |
International career
| Years | Team | Apps | (Points) |
| 1999 - 2007; | Samoa | 9 | (9) |

Tanielu "Tani" Fuga (born 14 July 1973) is a Samoan rugby union player. Born in Apia, he was brought up by his grandparents, Iosia and Salavao Fuga and they moved to Auckland in 1986 for him to study. He attended Waitakere College in Auckland and played for the Waitemata club.

He played as hooker and, after playing for Samoa in 1999, decided to move to the UK as one of his idols, Keith Wood played there for Harlequins. Tani joined Quins in 2000 and made his debut as a replacement against London Wasps on 9 September that year. He scored his first try for the club in the European Challenge Cup victory over Périgueux at the Twickenham Stoop on 7 October 2000. He retired from playing after a benefit year organised at Harlequins in 2010 and returned to New Zealand.

He won nine caps for Samoa and scored a try in his second game against New Zealand back in June 1999. He was a member of the Samoan squad at the 2007 Rugby World Cup finals.

Fuga opened a branch of Nando's in Ponsonby Road, Auckland, New Zealand, on 6 September 2011 for the 2011 Rugby World Cup, but it closed in late 2013 due to low sales.
