= Fifita Mounga =

US international rugby union player

- Born: March 1, 1973 (age 53) Haasini, Tonga
- Height: 1.78 m (5 ft 10 in)
- Weight: 111 kg (245 lb)

Rugby union career
- Position: Flanker
Senior career
Years	Team	Apps	(Points)
- San Francisco Golden Gate
International career
Years	Team	Apps	(Points)
1998–2007	United States	20	(10)

Fifita "Tasi" Mounga (born 1 March 1973 in Haasini, Tonga) is a former American rugby union back row forward. He was a member of the United States national rugby union team that participated in the 2007 Rugby World Cup.
