= Chad Erskine =

US international rugby union player

Chad Erskine (born 8 January 1980 in Pietermaritzburg) is an American former rugby union scrum-half. He was a member of the United States national rugby union team and participated with the squad at the 2007 Rugby World Cup. He is currently a Rugby Color Commentator and Analysts for PRO Rugby.
