= Salesi Sika =

US international rugby union player

- Born: Charles Salesi Sika; July 7, 1980 (age 46) Haveluloto, Tonga
- Height: 6 ft 1 in (1.85 m)
- Weight: 250 lb (110 kg)

Rugby union career
- Position: Wing/Centre
Senior career
Years	Team	Apps	(Points)
2006–2008	Béziers	52	(65)
2008–2010	Castres	30	(5)
International career
Years	Team	Apps	(Points)
2003–2009	United States	22	(25)
- Correct as of 31 December 2020

Salesi Sika (born 6 July 1980) is a former Tongan-born American rugby union player and played as a wing or centre.

Sika played professional rugby in the French league for Castres Olympique and AS Béziers. He was a member of the United States national rugby union team from 2003–2009 and participated with the squad at the 2003 Rugby World Cup and the 2007 Rugby World Cup.

Sika also played rugby for Brigham Young University in Utah where he was four time collegiate All-American, and played in the championship game in his senior year.

== See also ==
- United States national rugby union team
