= Kisi Pulu =

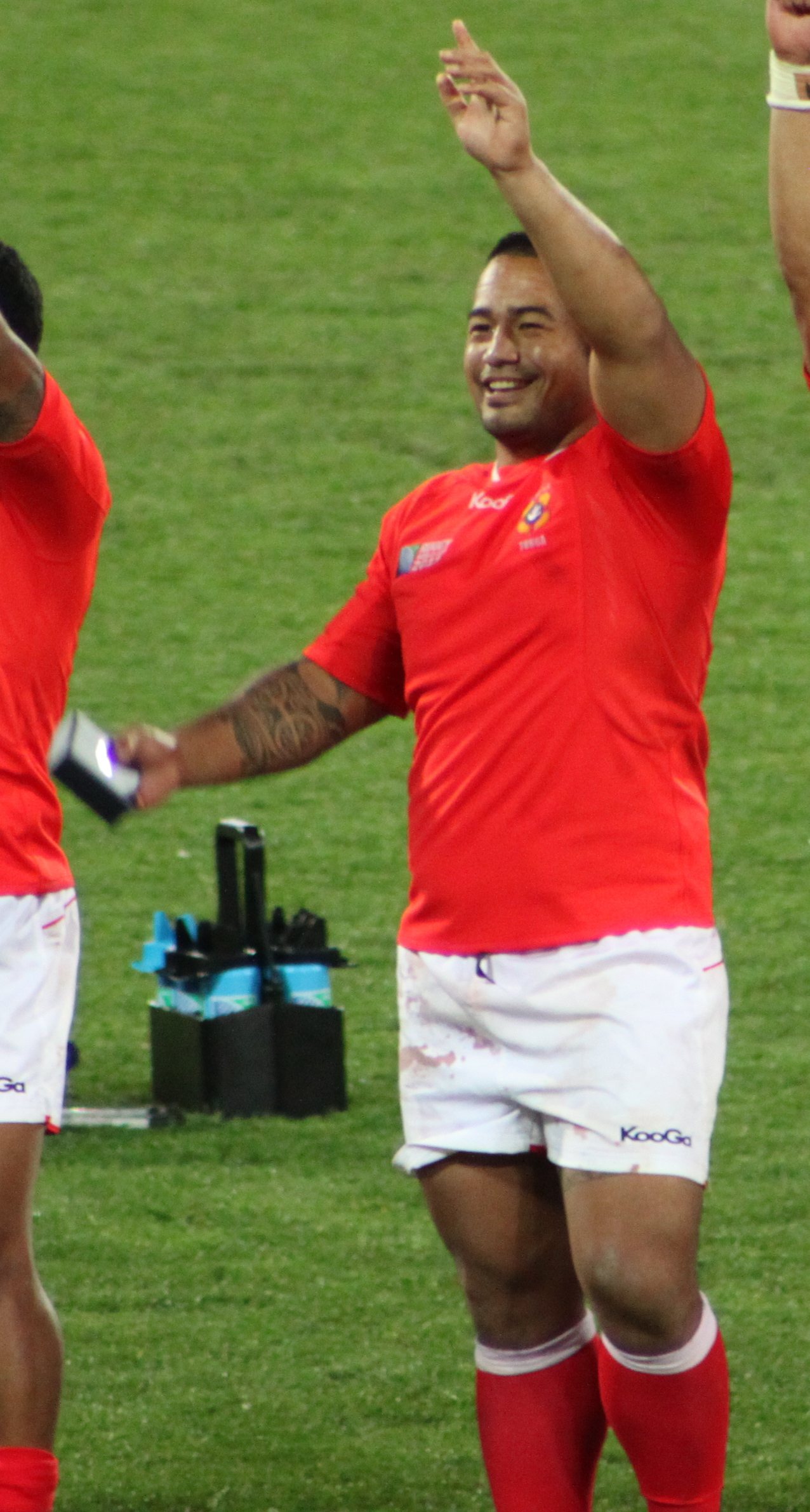
- Born: January 31, 1979 (age 47) Leimatu'a, Tonga
- Height: 1.75 m (5 ft 9 in)
- Weight: 115 kg (18 st 2 lb; 254 lb)

Rugby union career
- Position: Prop
Senior career
Years	Team	Apps	(Points)
2006-2007	SC Albi	20	(5)
2007-2015	Perpignan	179	(15)
2015	Stade Toulousain	8	(0)
International career
Years	Team	Apps	(Points)
2002-	Tonga	26	(15)
2008	Pacific Islanders	3	(0)

Kisi Pulu (born 31 January 1979 in Leimatu'a, Tonga) is a rugby union footballer. His usual position is at prop. He currently plays for USA Perpignan in the Top 14 in France. He also plays for Tonga.
