= Paino Hehea =

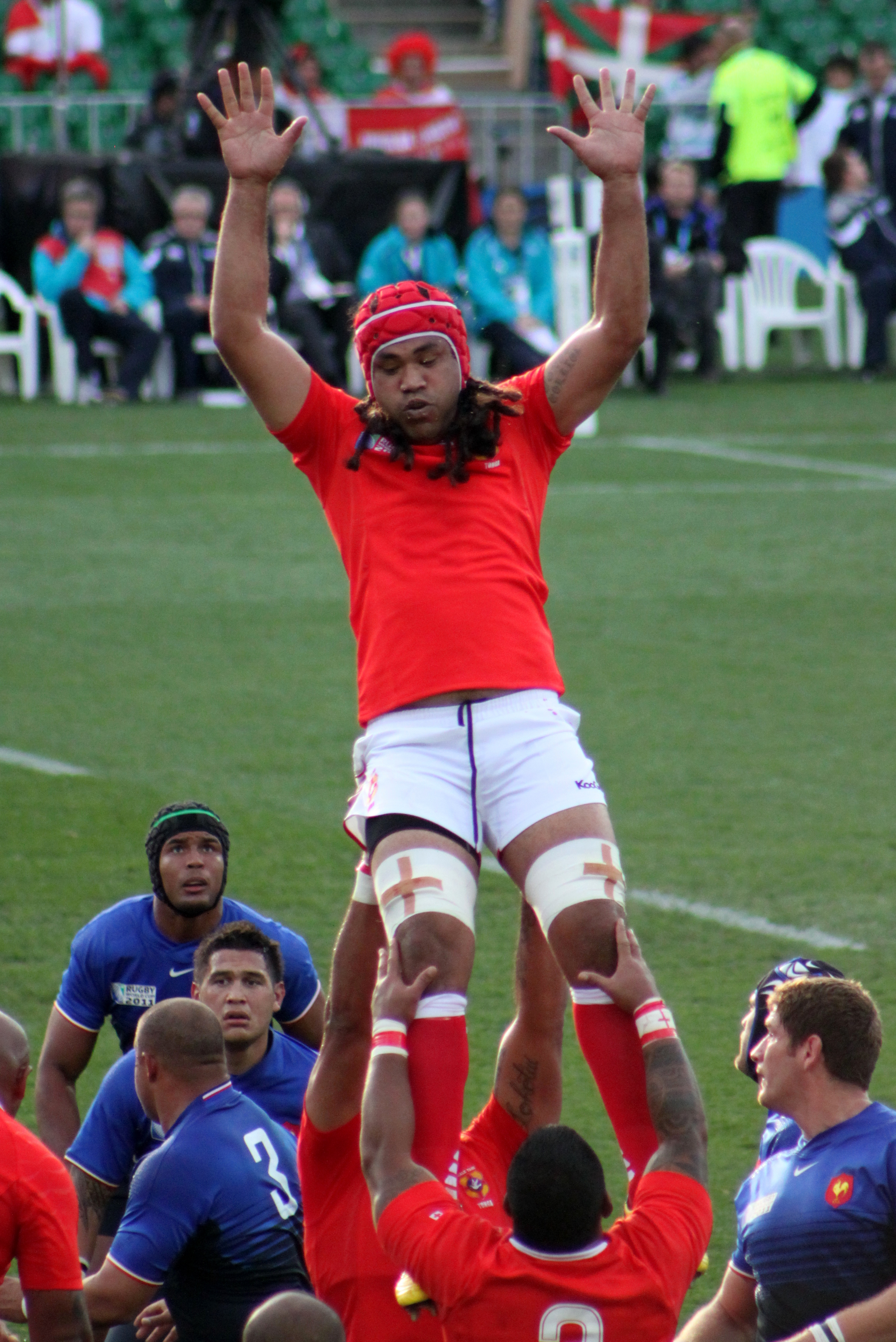
- Born: January 2, 1979 (age 47) Vaini, Tonga
- Height: 1.97 m (6 ft 6 in)
- Weight: 114 kg (251 lb)

Rugby union career
- Position: Lock
Senior career
Years	Team	Apps	(Points)
2011-	Rugby Calvisano		
- Lyon OU
2009-2011	Racing Métro 92		
International career
Years	Team	Apps	(Points)
2006-	Tonga	11	(10)

Kelekolio Paino Hehea (born 2 January 1979) in Vaini, Tonga) is rugby union footballer. His usual position is at lock. He currently plays for Rugby Calvisano after signing from Lyon OU.

Paino spent several seasons playing for Darlington Mowden Park R.F.C., a leading rugby union club in North East England. He played for Tonga at the 2011 Rugby World Cup.
