= Vahafolau Esikia =

US international rugby union player

- Born: November 28, 1979 (age 46) Nieafu, Vava'u
- Height: 5 ft 11 in (1.80 m)
- Weight: 210 lb (95 kg)

Rugby union career
- Position: Centre
International career
Years	Team	Apps	(Points)
2006-2008	USA	17	(20)

Vahafolau Esikia (born 28 November 1979 in Nieafu) was an American rugby union centre. He was a member of the United States national rugby union team and participated with the squad at the 2007 Rugby World Cup. His uncle Alatini Saulala represented USA at the 1999 Rugby World Cup.

He was the President and Director of Operations for the Las Vegas Rugby Academy.

He is now the Assistant coach for the Utah warriors select team. He is living in Salt lake city, Utah. He is now married to retired professional boxer, Sana Esikia. He has 8 total kids. He was offered a football scholarship to Oregon University but turned it down to serve a 2-year mission in Connecticut. He has 2 other siblings, a brother and a sister.
