= Pierre Hola =

Tonga international rugby union player

- Born: Raymond Pierre Hola; 9 June 1978 (age 48) Sydney, Australia
- Height: 183 cm (6 ft 0 in)
- Weight: 124 kg (19 st 7 lb; 273 lb)
- School: Canterbury Boys' High School

Rugby union career
- Position(s): Fly half, Centre, Fullback, Wing
- Current team: Eastwood rugby
Senior career
Years	Team	Apps	(Points)
- West Harbour
2008–2009	Kobelco Steelers		
2009–2010	Viadana	9	(39)
2010	Parramatta		
2011–2014	Eastwood		
- Helelensvale Hogs
International career
Years	Team	Apps	(Points)
1998–2009	Tonga	39	(317)
2008	Pacific Islanders	1	(5)

Pierre Hola (born 9 June 1978) is an Australian-born former rugby union footballer. He represented Tonga and played club rugby in the Australian Shute Shield for Eastwood.

== Career ==
Hola made his debut for Tonga in September 1998 in a match against Samoa, and has since earned 57 test caps, including representing Tonga at the 2003 Rugby World Cup in Australia where he was their top scorer and the 2007 Rugby World Cup.

In 2016, he began playing for the Helensvale Hogs.

=== 2007 RWC ===
He was an integral part of Tonga's successful rugby world cup 2007 campaign, again being their top scorer kicking 44 points for the 2nd consecutive world cup tournament. A memorable moment for him came from the hard-fought 30-25 loss to the eventual champions South Africa. Trapped inside the Tongan 22, he launched a cross field kick to set up a counterattack which resulted in one of the tries of the tournament (scored by Viliami Vaki).

=== Pacific Nations Cup ===
Hola was a late call-up for the Tongan team in the 2008 IRB Pacific Nations Cup. He would play in their 35-13 loss to Japan, 15-20 defeat to Samoa and 27-16 victory over Fiji. He has since been selected for the 2008 Pacific Islanders rugby union team to tour Europe in November, playing games against France, England and Italy.
