= Albert Tuipulotu =

US international rugby union player

- Born: Albert Joseph Tuipulotu; February 27, 1979 (age 47) San Mateo, California
- Height: 6 ft 1 in (1.85 m)
- Weight: 220 lb (100 kg)

Rugby union career
- Position: Centre
Senior career
Years	Team	Apps	(Points)
2005–2007	Crociati Parma Rugby FC	10	(0)
2007–2008	AS Béziers Hérault	11	(0)
International career
Years	Team	Apps	(Points)
2004–2008	United States	19	(15)
- Correct as of 31 December 2020

Albert Tuipulotu (born February 27, 1979, in San Mateo) is an American rugby union centre. He is a member of the United States national rugby union team and participated with the squad at the 2007 Rugby World Cup. As a HS Football player, Tuipulotu completed a senior season with 45 touchdowns and 2,640 yards gained, both Northern California one-season records, to earn recognition by The Examiner as Player of the Year on the 1996 San Francisco-Metro All-Star Football Team.
