= Chris Osentowski =

US international rugby union player

- Born: February 26, 1975 (age 51) Des Moines, Iowa, U.S.
- Height: 5 ft 11 in (1.80 m)
- Weight: 251 lb (114 kg)

Rugby union career
- Position: Prop
International career
Years	Team	Apps	(Points)
2004–2007	USA	18	(0)

Chris Osentowski (born February 26, 1975, in Des Moines, Iowa) is an American rugby union prop. He is a member of the United States national rugby union team and participated with the squad at the 2007 Rugby World Cup.
