= Mike Petri =

American rugby union player/coach

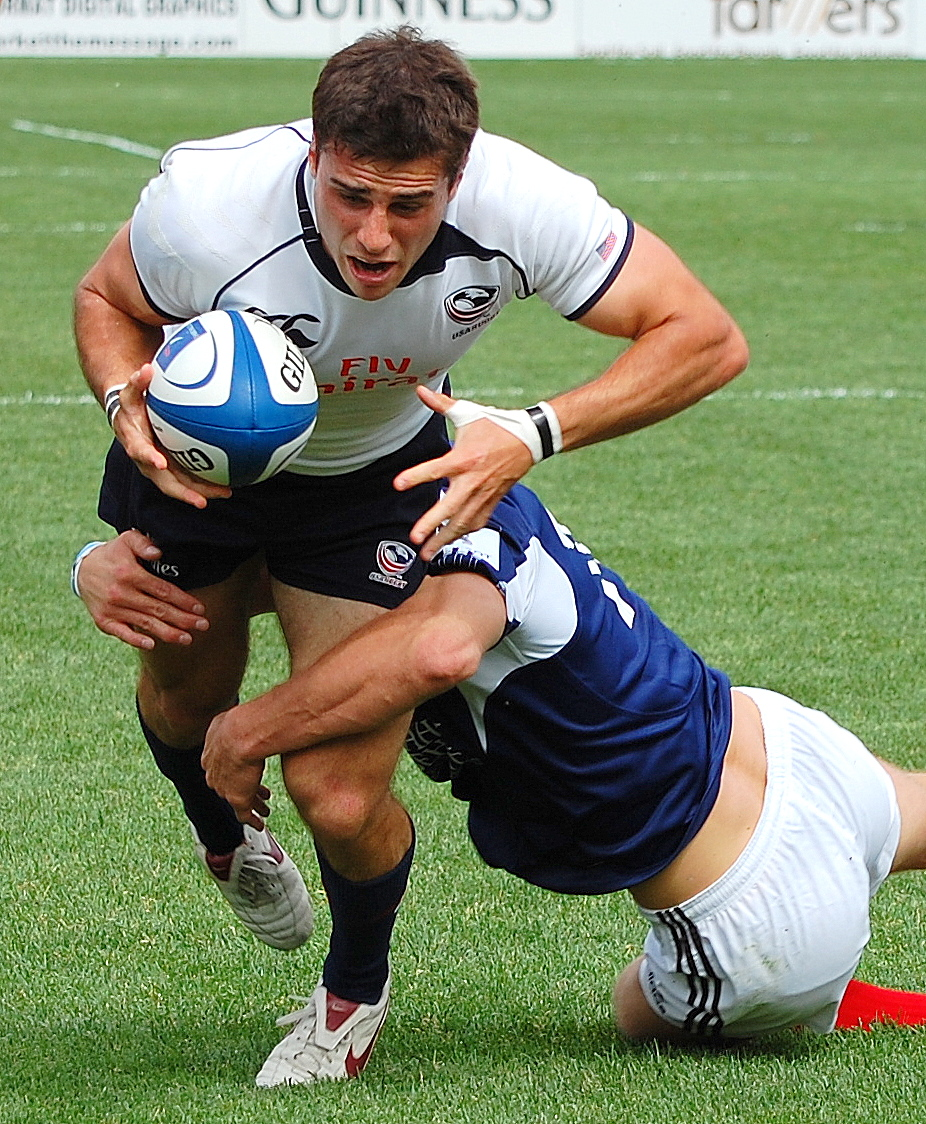
- Petri diving through a tackle to score a try for the USA Eagles against Russia during the 2010 Churchill Cup.
- Born: August 16, 1984 (age 42) Brooklyn, New York, U.S.
- Height: 1.78 m (5 ft 10 in)
- Weight: 83 kg (13 st 1 lb)
- University: Pennsylvania State University
- Occupation: Rugby union player/coach

Rugby union career
- Position: Scrum-half
Amateur team(s)
Years	Team	Apps	(Points)
1998–2002	Xavier High School		
2002–2006	Penn State Lions		
2007–2009	NYAC RFC		
Senior career
Years	Team	Apps	(Points)
2010	Sale	0	(0)
2011	Dragons	3	(0)
2018–2019	RUNY	22	(25)
- Correct as of 2 April 2021
International career
Years	Team	Apps	(Points)
2001–2003	United States U20		
2007–2015	United States	57	(33)
2013	Bermuda Select XV		
- Correct as of 11 October 2015
Coaching career
- Years: Team
- 2019–Present: NYAC RFC

Michael Zachary Petri (born August 16, 1984) is a former American rugby union player who played for Rugby United New York (RUNY) of Major League Rugby (MLR). His position was scrum-half. He is known as "Peaches" by his teammates. He currently is the head coach for RUNY's academy development program.

Petri has previously played for the Newport Gwent Dragons, Sale Sharks, and Barbarians FC (2009).

== Early life and education ==
Petri began playing rugby as a freshman at Xavier High School in New York City. Petri's father, also Mike, played rugby as a youth at St. Francis Prep and encouraged his participation in the sport.

He then attended Penn State University where he was a four-time College All American. He graduated with a degree in Life Sciences and a minor in Business. He was on the Deans List, the Alpha Epsilon Delta National Pre-Health Honors Society, and the Phi Eta Sigma National Honors Society.

== Rugby career ==
Petri captained the USA U19 and College All-American sides and won the 2006 Doug Edwards Award, which is awarded to the most outstanding collegiate rugby player.

Petri earned 57 test caps for the United States national rugby union team representing the United States at the 2007 Rugby World Cup in France, the 2011 Rugby World Cup in New Zealand, and the 2015 Rugby World Cup in England. He served as captain of NYAC and led them to national championship titles in 2008, 2010, 2012, and 2015. He also won a national championship title with Belmont Shore RFC in 2007 while living in Long Beach, CA. Petri signed to play with Rugby United New York in October 2018 and served as their captain for the 2019 MLR season.

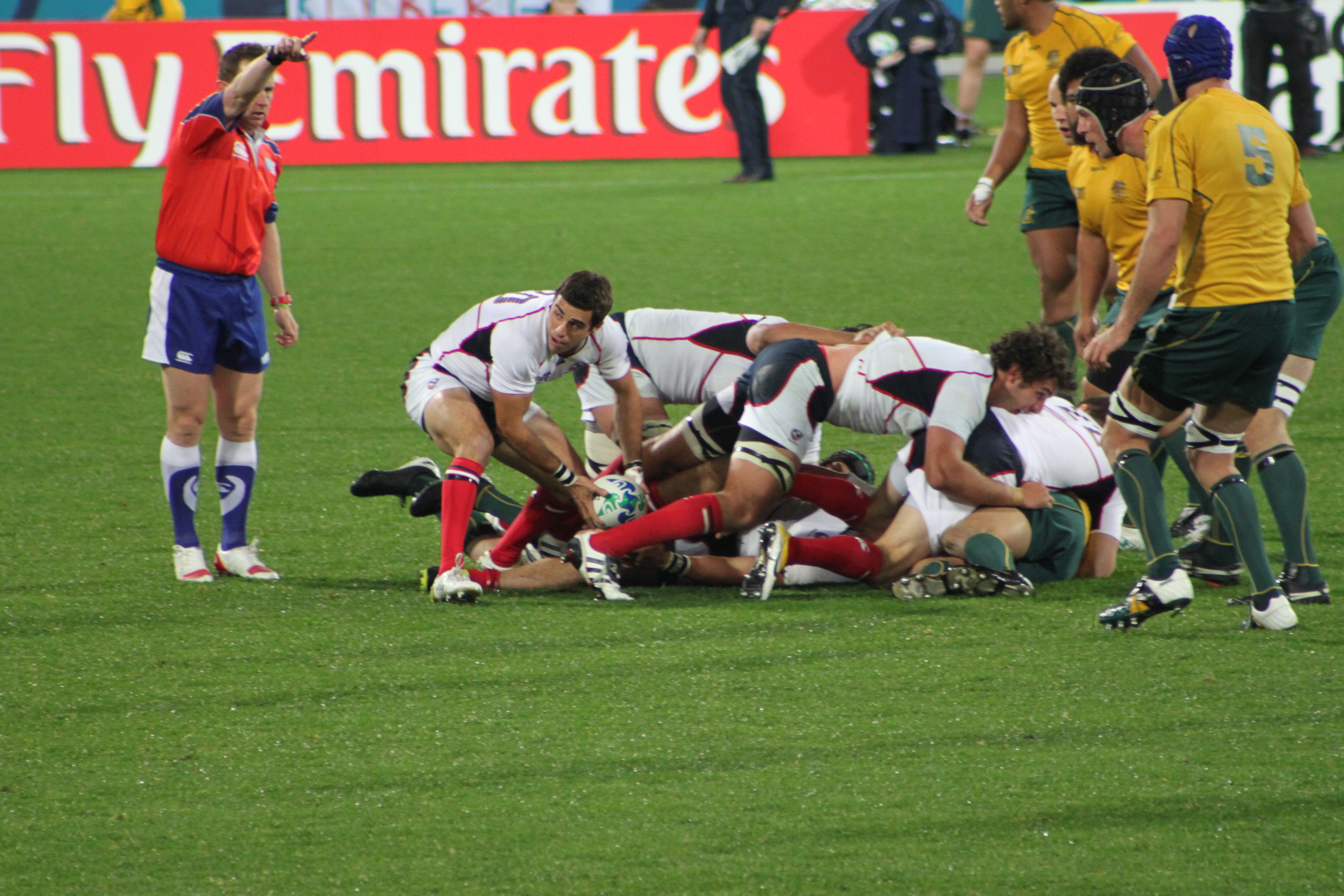
Petri during the 2011 World Cup

== Coaching career ==
Petri was named head coach of New York Athletic Club Rugby for the 2019 Elite Cup season.

In 2021, Petri stepped away from the playing field to become a full-time head coach for Rugby United New York's creation of an academy program to identify and develop local collegiate and talent for the club.

== Personal life ==
Outside of rugby, Petri worked at his family's plumbing business and in construction. He also worked with a UBS wealth management team. He became more involved in portfolio analysis and trading but quit the job to pursue rugby full-time.

Petri is an accomplished author, writing the children's alphabet book R is for Rugby, which was published in June 2015.

Petri is the Director of Athletics, Upper School Teacher: Math, Science, Coach: Middle School Soccer, Varsity Soccer, JV Basketball, Varsity Baseball at Bay Ridge Preparatory School, in Brooklyn, New York, since 2018

== Honors ==
=== Team ===
- Rugby Super League (4): 2007, 2008, 2010, 2012
- Division 1 Club Rugby Championship (1): 2015

=== Individual ===
- Collegiate All-American (4): 2003, 2004, 2005, 2006
- Collegiate All-Star Tournament MVP (1): 2006
- Doug Edwards Award (1): 2006
- NYAC Male Athlete of the Year (1): 2011
- Rugby Super League Finals MVP (1) 2010
- Division 1 Club Rugby Championship Finals MVP (1): 2015
