= Epi Taione =

Tonga international rugby union player (born 1979)

Epeli Taione
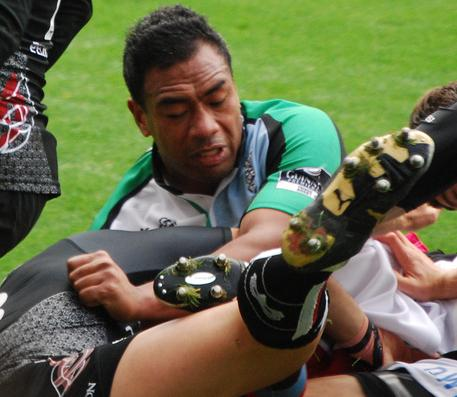
- Born: Epeli Taione; 2 March 1979 (age 47) Vauai'i, Tonga
- Height: 1.93 m (6 ft 4 in)
- Weight: 115 kg (18 st 2 lb)

Rugby union career
- Position(s): Centre, Flanker, Number Eight, Wing
Senior career
Years	Team	Apps	(Points)
2001–2005	Newcastle Falcons	32	(20)
2005–2006	Sale Sharks	6	(0)
2007–2008	Sharks	3	(0)
2008–2009	Harlequin F.C.	6	(10)
2009–2010	Racing Métro 92	8	(0)
2010–2012	London Welsh	23	(0)
- Correct as of 3 November 2018
International career
Years	Team	Apps	(Points)
1999–2009	Tonga	18	(10)
2006–08	Pacific Islanders	6	(5)
- Correct as of 30 December 2011

Epi Taione (born 2 March 1979) is a Tongan former rugby union footballer whose last club was London Welsh. He normally played at centre but could cover the wing or back row.

== Rugby career ==
He started his professional career at Newcastle Falcons. In the summer of 2005, he joined Sale Sharks on a two-year contract. However, his contract was cancelled when he was banned for 18 weeks for biting Denis Leamy in a Heineken Cup game against Munster. In the 2005–2006 season, Taione made 5 appearances before his contract was terminated, and Sale Sharks won their first ever Premiership title. After his ban he went to Japan to play for the Sanyo Wild Knights.

Taione controversially changed his name to Paddy Power for the duration of the 2007 Rugby World Cup in a sponsorship deal agreed with the Irish bookmaker. the sponsorship deal financed the Tongan preparation for the World Cup. The Tongans nearly beat the eventual winner, South Africa, and lost narrowly to the other finalist, England.

He then went to play for the Sharks, but in the 2008 Super 14 season he was suspended for six weeks after headbutting a Wellington Hurricanes player, and was also suspended for two weeks in the IRB Pacific 5 Nations after dangerously tackling New Zealand Maori Number Eight, Thomas Waldrom. His next move was to Harlequins, but he received little playing time and so moved on to the French side Racing Métro 92 in 2009. In 2010, he joined London Welsh.

He played for Tonga at the 1999 and 2007 Rugby World Cups. He also played for the Pacific Islanders.

Taione was forced to retire in December 2011 due to a serious knee injury.

In 2009, Taione had a small non-speaking role as a member of the New Zealand Rugby team in the film Invictus.

He is a founder member of APBs aka The Brothers, an invitational club that is instrumental in developing the game in the Asia and Pacific regions. He is involved in a few business ventures around the world including clubs and bars in London. He's a board member of the Tongan Rugby Union.
