= Matekitonga Moeakiola =

US international rugby union player

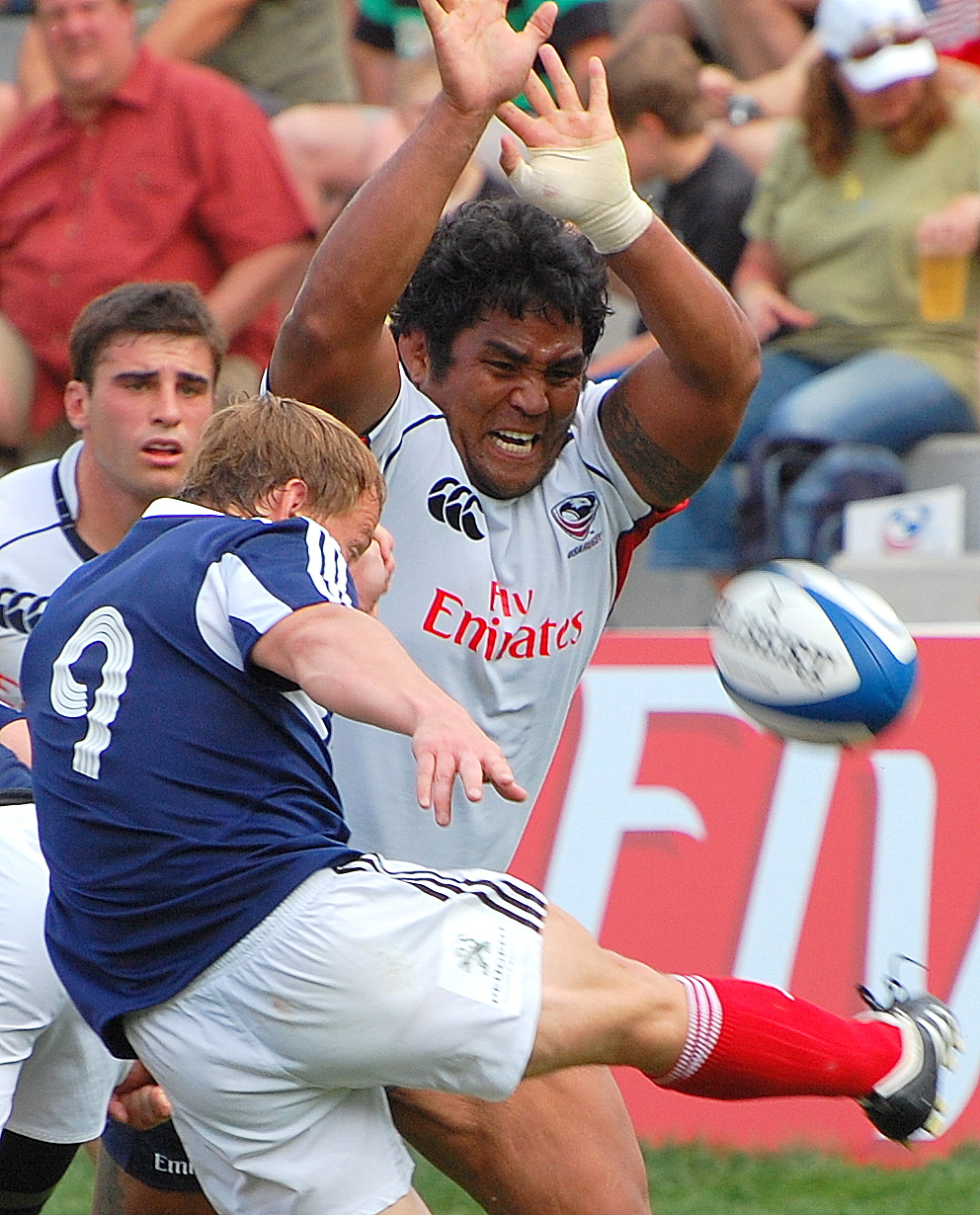
- Born: Matekitonga Moeakiola; May 16, 1978 (age 48) Tongatapu, Tonga
- Height: 6 ft 0 in (1.83 m)
- Weight: 18 st 13 lb (120 kg 260 lb)

Rugby union career
- Position: Prop
Amateur team(s)
Years	Team	Apps	(Points)
2005-2007	University of Utah		
–	Park City Haggis RFC		
Senior career
Years	Team	Apps	(Points)
2009–2010	SC Albi	7	(5)
2010–2012	AC Bobigny 93	34	(30)
2012–2014	USO Nevers	29	(0)
2014–2015	Castanet Rugby	14	(0)
- Correct as of 25 December 2020
International career
Years	Team	Apps	(Points)
2007–2015	United States	32	(5)
- Correct as of 7 October 2015

Matekitonga Moeakiola (born 16 May 1978) is a former Tonga-born American rugby union player who last played for Castanet Rugby at club level. Moeakiola played as a prop.

Moeakiola played for both East Coast Bays RFC and Glenfield RFC in the Harbour club rugby competition. Moeakiola also played for Patumahoe RFC in the Counties Manukau Club rugby competition. Mate never played for Harbour or Counties NPC sides.

Mate was first noticed by the U.S. national team while playing rugby at the University of Utah. He has since played for the North America 4 Tournament, and the U.S. team that played Munster in Chicago.

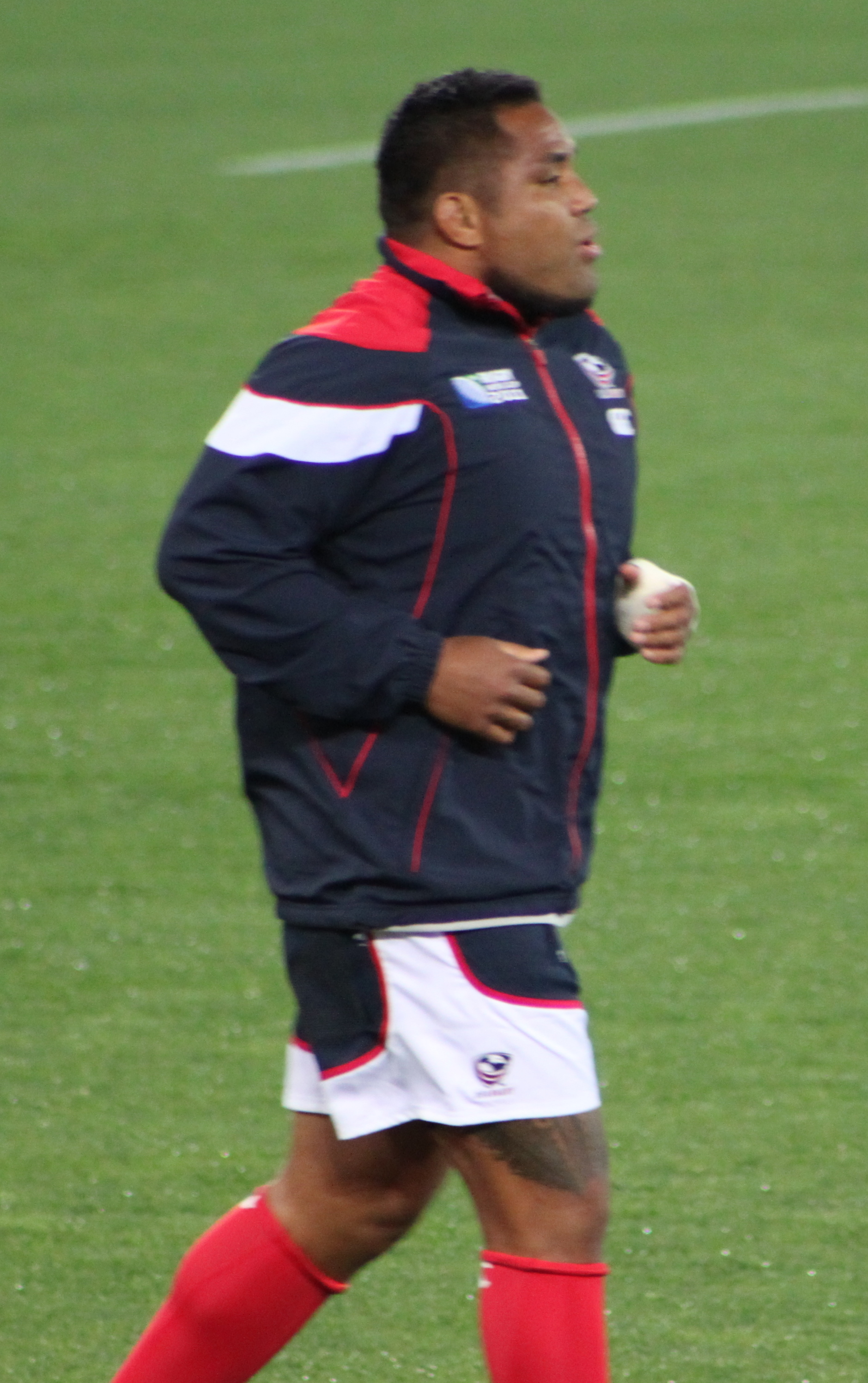
Moeakiola before a match vs Australia in the 2011 Rugby World Cup

Mate played at the 2007 Rugby World Cup. Moeakiola made his debut at the 2007 Rugby World Cup, scoring a try after coming on as a substitute in the Eagles' opening match against England. Moeakiola played in all four matches at the 2007 RWC and scored a try against England in the USA's first match of the tournament.
