= Hale T-Pole =

Tonga international rugby union player

- Born: Tevita Hale Nai Tu'uhoko; 30 April 1979 (age 47) Longolongo, Tonga
- Height: 6 ft 1 in (1.85 m)
- Weight: 16 st 1 lb (225 lb; 102 kg)

Rugby union career
- Position(s): Flanker, number eight
Amateur team(s)
Years	Team	Apps	(Points)
2013–14	Havelock Sports Club		
- Correct as of 24 August 2015
Senior career
Years	Team	Apps	(Points)
2007–08	Ospreys	7	(0)
2008–10	Suntory Sungoliath	0	(0)
2010–11	Ricoh Black Rams	13	(10)
- Correct as of 24 August 2015
Provincial / State sides
Years	Team	Apps	(Points)
1999–2000	Otago	8	(0)
2000–07	Southland	60	(80)
2012	Northland	7	(0)
2013	Southland	11	(5)
- Correct as of 23 October 2013
Super Rugby
Years	Team	Apps	(Points)
2004–07	Highlanders	19	(5)
- Correct as of 24 August 2015
International career
Years	Team	Apps	(Points)
2006–08	Pacific Islanders	5	(0)
2007–	Tonga	33	(10)
- Correct as of 29 September 2015

Tevita Hale Nai Tu'uhoko, often known simply as Hale T-Pole or Hale T Pole, (born 30 April 1979) is a Tongan rugby union footballer who plays as a flanker or number eight for the Ricoh Black Rams in the Top League in Japan. He has also played internationally for Tonga and the Pacific Islanders.

== Playing career ==
=== New Zealand ===
An impressive talent from a young age, T-Pole was selected to national secondary school sides and made his provincial rugby debut with Otago in 1999. He transferred to Southland in 2000, and quickly became a core member of the squad. He would go on to score 16 tries in 60 appearances for the Stags.

After several strong seasons with Southland, T-Pole made his debut for the Highlanders in the 2004 Super 12 season. After making only three appearances in his first two seasons with the Highlanders, he emerged as a regular in the 2006 Super 14 season, appearing in 10 of 13 matches including 5 starts.

In the 2007 Super 14 season, T-Pole was limited to 6 substitute appearances for the Highlanders, although he did manage to score his first and only Super Rugby try, against the Stormers on 24 February.

T-Pole's last matches for Southland were the first two rounds of the 2007 Air New Zealand Cup, after which he departed for the 2007 Rugby World Cup and then Europe.

T-Pole will return to New Zealand in 2012 and play for Northland in the ITM Cup.

=== Europe ===
T-Pole left New Zealand to sign with Ospreys for the 2007–08 Celtic League season, joining the squad after the 2007 Rugby World Cup. However, he endured a difficult season in Wales, making only 7 appearances before leaving in 2008.

=== Japan ===
T-Pole signed with Suntory Sungoliath of the Top League in Japan in 2008, and spent two seasons with the club.

For the 2010–11 season, he signed with the Ricoh Black Rams.

=== Return to New Zealand ===
In June 2012, it was announced that T-Pole had signed for Northland for the 2012 ITM Cup season. On 25 August 2012, he made his Northland debut against Otago.

=== Sri Lanka ===
Hale T-Pole has signed for Sri Lankan Premier Championship side, Havelock Sports Club, for the 2013–14 Rugby Season. He will be a player/coach for the club from Sri Lanka's Capital Colombo. He will join Tongan National teammate Willie Hakala who played for Havelock SC last year.

== International career ==
T-Pole represented New Zealand at the under-21 level but never received a senior callup to the All Blacks.

He was selected to the Pacific Islanders rugby union team which toured Europe in 2006, and selected again for the same tour in 2008.

T-Pole scored a try on his debut for Tonga against Korea on 10 February 2007, and was selected to the Tongan squad for the 2007 Rugby World Cup. However, his World Cup was blighted by a red-carding in a match against Samoa on 16 September.

After the World Cup, T-Pole continued as a regular member of the Tongan side until 2009.
