= Mike MacDonald (rugby union) =

American rugby union player (born 1980)

- Born: November 27, 1980 (age 45) Berkeley, California, U.S.
- Height: 6 ft 1 in (1.85 m)
- Weight: 270 lb (120 kg)
- University: University of California, Berkeley
- Occupation: Professional rugby union player

Rugby union career
- Position: Prop
Senior career
Years	Team	Apps	(Points)
2005–2006	Worcester Warriors	6	(0)
2006–2012	Leeds Carnegie	128	(130)
- Correct as of February 6, 2014
International career
Years	Team	Apps	(Points)
2000–2012	United States	67	(30)

Mike MacDonald (born November 27, 1980, in Berkeley, California, United States) is a retired rugby union footballer who previously played for Leeds Carnegie in the RFU Championship and English Premiership. He represented the United States national team and predominantly played at the prop position.

== Youth and college ==
MacDonald started playing rugby during his sophomore year of high school in 1997. He graduated from Miramonte High School in 1999 and followed in the footsteps of his brother, who was also a rugby player. In addition to rugby, MacDonald showcased his talents in wrestling and football, achieving a remarkable 3rd place finish in state wrestling during his senior year of high school.

MacDonald went on to win four rugby National Championships with the University of California, Berkeley. During his time there, he received the honor of being named an All-American five times between 2000 and 2004. Following the 2004 national championship, he was recognized as the tournament MVP.

== Professional career ==
MacDonald had a professional career in England from 2005 to 2012, initially playing for the Worcester Warriors from 2005 to 2006. He then joined Leeds Carnegie from 2007 to 2012. MacDonald played a pivotal role for Leeds during the 2006-07 season, contributing to their success in winning National League 1 and securing promotion to the Premiership. Remarkably, he scored 10 tries that season, which is quite impressive for a front row player. Following the 2007-08 Premiership season, MacDonald was honored with the title of Leeds' Player of the Season, and he was appointed captain for the 2008-09 season. In June 2011, MacDonald extended his contract with Leeds Carnegie for an additional two years. However, in April 2012, he was released from Leeds.

== International career ==
MacDonald's debut for the United States was against Fiji on June 30, 2000. MacDonald has represented the USA in three Rugby World Cups – 2003, 2007 and 2011. At the 2011 Rugby World Cup, MacDonald broke two US records: he tallied his 63rd cap, surpassing Luke Gross as the United States' most-capped player, and made his 11th appearance in a Rugby World Cup match, breaking the record held by Alec Parker. MacDonald was named Man of the Match in the United States' win over Russia at the 2011 Rugby World Cup; MacDonald was key as the US scrum made Russia wilt under pressure and MacDonald was outstanding at the breakdown.

== Coaching career ==
MacDonald was signed on as an assistant coach of the California Golden Bears rugby team in 2011. Since his joining of the team as the forwards coach in the 2011–12 season, Cal Rugby has made seven 15's national championship appearances, including two victories in 2016 and 2017.

== See also ==
- United States national rugby union team
- Leeds Carnegie
