= Nili Latu =

Tonga international rugby union player

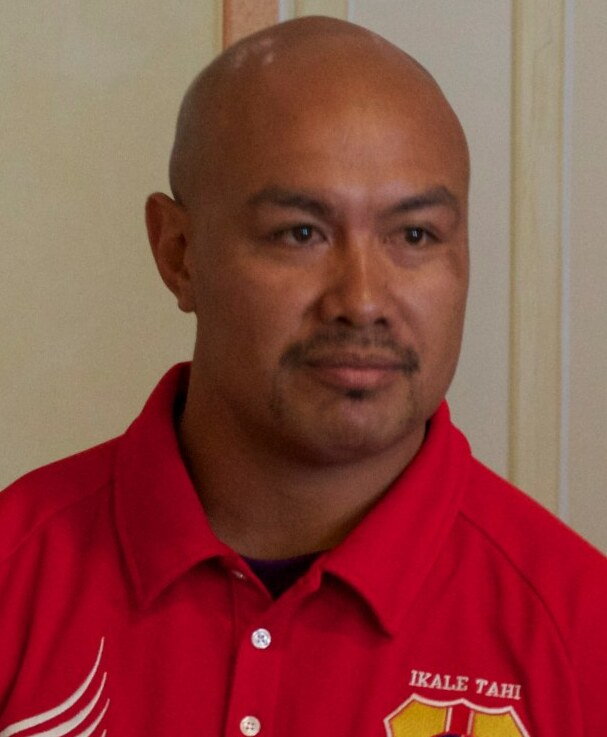
- Born: 'Otenili Latu Langilangi; 19 February 1982 (age 44) Afa, Tonga
- Height: 1.82 m (6 ft 0 in)
- Weight: 101 kg (15 st 13 lb; 223 lb)
- Notable relative: Doug Howlett (cousin)

Rugby union career
- Position(s): Flanker, Number 8
Senior career
Years	Team	Apps	(Points)
2007–2015	NEC Green Rockets	89	(195)
2015–2018	Newcastle Falcons	48	(50)
2018–2021	Hino Red Dolphins	20	(20)
- Correct as of 20 February 2021
Provincial / State sides
Years	Team	Apps	(Points)
2004–2007	Bay of Plenty	25	(15)
- Correct as of 24 August 2015
Super Rugby
Years	Team	Apps	(Points)
2005–2006	Chiefs	2	(5)
2007	Hurricanes	3	(0)
- Correct as of 24 August 2015
International career
Years	Team	Apps	(Points)
2006−	Tonga	54	(28)
2006–2008	Pacific Islanders	6	(0)
2018	Barbarians	1	(0)
- Correct as of 3 July 2017

Nili Latu, playing name of Otenili Langilangi (born 19 February 1982) is a Tongan rugby union footballer. In 2018, Latu left Newcastle Falcons after helping Falcons achieve 4th in the Aviva Premiership, the highest finish in 20 years. He moved to Japan to continue playing rugby.

Latu started his rugby at Bay of Plenty in the Air New Zealand Cup. He made his debut for the Chiefs in 2005 in a match against the Sharks. He made his debut for Tonga on June 4, 2006 against Japan. He then played against Fiji, and in his third Test, skippered Tonga against the Junior All Blacks, and then against the Cook Islands. He was used as a replacement in the match against Samoa, and then captained the side against the second Test against the Cook Islands.

In late 2006 Latu was drafted into the Hurricanes squad as cover for All Black absentees Jerry Collins and Rodney So'oialo for the 2007 season. He played in the 2007 Rugby World Cup for Tonga where he was instrumental for their National Team. He also made a name for himself with his big tackles. In 2008 he was included in a list of the 50 best rugby players in the world by The Independent newspaper.

He joined Japanese club NEC Green Rockets in 2007 and made 63 appearances before moving to his new club Newcastle Falcons at the end of the 2015 season. He has also captained the Tonga national rugby side at international level and has appeared in two Rugby World Cup's. Nili has also played for the Pacific Islanders in the 2006 and 2008 tours.

On 17 April 2015, Latu left Japan to join English club Newcastle Falcons in the Aviva Premiership from the 2015-16 season.

After the 2017–18 Season Finished, Latu announced he would be leaving Newcastle Falcons and Returning to his former club NEC Green Rockets.

On May 22, Latu was named in the Barbarians Squad to Face England in the Quilter Cup fixture. Nili played alongside Falcons teammate Josh Matavesi and helped Barbarians win 63-45 at Twickenham.
