= Viliami Vaki =

Tonga international rugby union player

- Born: Viliami Laukau Vaki; April 27, 1976 (age 50) Vava'u, Tonga
- Height: 6 ft 6 in (1.98 m)
- Weight: 210 lb (15 st 0 lb; 95 kg)

Rugby union career
- Position: Lock
Senior career
Years	Team	Apps	(Points)
2003–2005	Gran Ducato Parma Rugby	0	(0)
2005–2010	USA Perpignan	89	(80)
2011–2014	Rugby Reggio	38	(25)
International career
Years	Team	Apps	(Points)
2001–2008	Tonga	36	(35)

Viliami Vaki (born 27 April 1976) is a Tongan rugby union footballer. He represented Tonga at the 2003 Rugby World Cup and the 2007 Rugby World Cup. From 2003 to 2005 he played for Gran Rugby in Italy, then moved to USA Perpignan in the Top 14. He currently plays for Reggio in the Top12.

He made his debut for Tonga in May 2001 in a match against Fiji in which he was a part of the starting line-up. He played four other Tests that year, another against Fiji and one against Samoa, Scotland and Wales. In 2002 he was capped five times for Tonga, once against Japan and twice against both Fiji and Samoa.

He played in four Tests in early-mid-2003 and was then included in Tonga's 2003 Rugby World Cup squad in Australia. He played in four games during the tournament, all in the starting line-up; Italy, Wales, the All Blacks and Canada. He next played for Tonga in June 2005, with matches against Fiji and Samoa. Later that year he captained Tonga in two matches in November, one against Italy and one against France. Vaki was part of the Tonga squad for the 2007 Rugby World Cup, and scored a try in Tonga's second match against the United States and one against Samoa. He has also represented the Pacific Islanders after making his debut in 2006. He has 33 caps and 35 points (7 tries) for Tonga. He has 3 caps for the Pacific Islanders.
