= Todd Clever =

American rugby union player (born 1983)

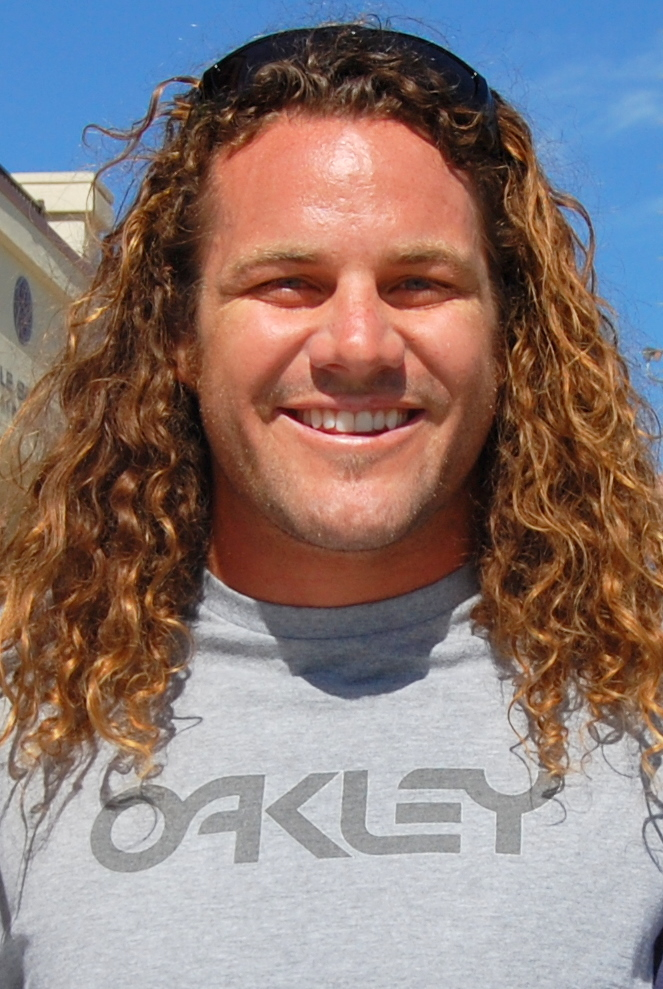
- Clever at the 2010 Churchill Cup
- Born: Todd Stanger Clever; 16 January 1983 (age 43) Palm Springs, California, U.S.
- Height: 6 ft 4 in (1.93 m)
- Weight: 213 lb (97 kg)
- School: Santa Teresa High School; University of Nevada, Reno

Rugby union career
- Position: Flanker
Amateur team(s)
Years	Team	Apps	(Points)
2015	OMBAC RFC		
2016–2018	Austin Huns		
- Correct as of January 23, 2015
Senior career
Years	Team	Apps	(Points)
2010–2012	Suntory	21	(50)
2012–2015	NTT	25	(35)
2015–2016	Newcastle	7	(0)
2018	Austin	5	(0)
- Correct as of 5 April 2020
Provincial / State sides
Years	Team	Apps	(Points)
2006	North Harbour		
2009–2010	Golden Lions	11	(0)
Super Rugby
Years	Team	Apps	(Points)
2009–2010	Lions	21	(15)
- Correct as of February 6, 2014
International career
Years	Team	Apps	(Points)
2000–2002	US U19		
2003–2017	United States	76	(80)
- Correct as of December 21, 2018
National sevens team
Years	Team		Comps
2004–2009	United States		24

Todd Stanger Clever (born January 16, 1983) is an American retired rugby union player. He became the first American to play Super Rugby. At the international level, he was a member of the United States national team, served as captain, and is the most capped player in United States rugby union history.

== Early life and education ==
Clever was born on January 16, 1983, in Palm Springs, California. He grew up in San Jose, California and attended Santa Teresa High School. He attended college at the University of Nevada, Reno and played for the club rugby team, where he was named a three-time collegiate All-American (2002–04).

== Club rugby career ==
=== National Provincial Championship ===
Clever began his professional career in New Zealand in 2006 when he joined North Harbour in the National Provincial Championship.

=== Super Rugby ===
He played with the South African Lions franchise in the 2009 Super 14. Clever is the first American player to ever play in the Super 14 and scored the first try for an American in Super 14 against the Hurricanes on March 28, 2009. Clever played for the Lions against the British & Irish Lions.

=== Top League ===
Clever joined Suntory of Japan in June 2010. In March 2012 Clever and Suntory won the Japan Top League final over Panasonic. He then went on to play for the BGC APBs which won the 2012 Hong Kong 10s tournament. In March 2012 Clever signed a contract with NTT Communications Shining Arcs another Top League club. He confirmed that he would be leaving the Shining Arcs after the 2015 season to rejoin his former club OMBAC to compete in the 2015 Pacific Rugby Premiership.

=== English Premiership ===
On September 17, 2015, Clever moved to England to join top professional club Newcastle Falcons in the Aviva Premiership for the 2015–16 season. He played one season for the Falcons, earning 6 caps.

=== Major League Rugby ===
In 2016, Clever signed on as both a co-owner and player for Austin Elite Rugby, an independent newly-professional club and one of the founding members of Major League Rugby, launched in 2018.

=== Pacific Rugby Premiership ===
In 2017, Clever won a PRP Title with Old Mission Beach Athletic Club RFC.

=== Austin Huns: 2017 USA D1 Club National Championship ===
In May and June 2017, Todd Clever played with the Austin Huns Rugby Football Club and assisted the Austin Huns in winning their first D1 Club National Championship with a 27 - 23 victory over the New York Athletic Club on June 3.

== International rugby career ==
=== Youth internationals ===
Clever was introduced to the United States national teams in July 2000 when he joined the U19 national team for their Australian tour. He was named to the team for the 2002 IRB FIRA/AER Junior World Championships in February 2002, with his last appearance for the U19's coming in their loss to Spain.

=== USA Eagles ===
Clever made his international debut against Argentina in August 2003, at the age of 20. Clever played for the US during the 2007 Rugby World Cup, where he intercepted a pass against South Africa that led to Takudzwa Ngwenya scoring the try of the 2007 World Cup.

Among other accolades, Clever was named the 2008 USA Rugby Men's Player of the Year by World Rugby Shop. Clever played in the 2009 Churchill Cup that saw the Eagles clinch the Bowl by beating Georgia. Clever further led the Eagles to success in 2009 by beating Uruguay in a home-and-away series to clinch a berth into the 2011 Rugby World Cup. Clever captained the team during the 2011 Rugby World Cup, starting three matches.

He was chosen as the North American Player of the Decade and the Ruggamatrix USA Player of the Decade for 2000–2009. For many years Clever was the captain and face of the United States national team.

On July 19, 2015, one day after a loss to Samoa in the Pacific Nations Cup, USA Rugby announced that Todd Clever was released from the Eagles roster due to "multiple squad conduct violations." After the Eagles finished their World Cup campaign, Clever published a letter explaining his version of the events. He claims that he had received permission to attend the ESPY awards show with Scott Lavalla as long as they were back and ready to train the following day. However the schedule was altered when Clever and Lavalla had left and they both missed an early morning gym session. Lavalla was dropped to the bench and Clever was dropped from the match day squad for their upcoming PNC match. Following this incident Clever also missed a morning jogging session, and this prompted Tolkin to kick Clever off the team. Tolkin did not recall Clever to the World Cup squad. Instead Clever spent a week training with the Barbarians F.C. Originally Clever was going to retire following the 2015 World Cup, but this incident motivated Clever to continue playing professional rugby.

Following poor results at the 2015 Rugby World Cup, USA Rugby parted ways with Mike Tolkin. Newly appointed head coach John Mitchell reintegrated Clever with the team immediately as well as reinstating him as captain of the squad. He became the most capped player in United States history on June 25, 2016, in the United States' 2016 mid-year rugby union internationals match against Russia.

On June 21, Clever announced his international retirement and his last game was the Eagles' 52–16 win over Canada which caused the United States to qualify for the 2019 Rugby World Cup as Americas 1.

=== USA Sevens ===
Clever has also played for the US national rugby sevens team. In late 2009, Clever scored what was deemed the try of the day in George. In the final match of the day for the US against Scotland, Clever leaped over an injured player and physio and glided into the try zone for a consolation try.

== Personal life ==
Clever was featured in ESPN The Magazine's 2015 The Body Issue and was the first rugby player in the edition's history.

On August 31, 2020, he announced his engagement to Maya Stojan on various social media.

== Training ==
Over his career, Clever's training has included lower body and rotational power, foundational based lower body strength training to improve force production and attempt to lower risk of injuries, and rugby-specific Energy System Development.

== Awards and honors ==
- U-19 National Team Member (2000–2002)
- 3-time College All-American (2002–2004)
- USA Eagles (7s)
- USA Eagles (XVs)
- Captain USA Eagles (XVs)
- First American to play in the Super 14
- First American to score a try in the Super 14
- 2006 ARN Player of the Year
- 2008 USA Rugby Men's Player of the Year
- 2009 RUGBYMag.com Player of the Year
- 2009 RUGBYMag.com Overseas Performer of the Year
- North American Rugby Player of the Decade 2000–2009
- RuggaMatrix USA Player of the Decade 2000–2009

== International tries ==
Try	Opposing team	Venue	Competition	Date	Result	Score	Ref.
1	Canada	Commonwealth Stadium, Edmonton	2006 Churchill Cup	June 17, 2006	Lost	18–33	
2	Barbados	Buck Shaw Stadium, Santa Clara	2007 Rugby World Cup Qualifier	July 1, 2006	Won	91–0	
3	Canada	Swilers Rugby Park, St. John's	2007 Rugby World Cup Qualifier	August 12, 2006	Lost	56–7	
4	Uruguay	Parque Central, Montevideo	2007 Rugby World Cup Qualifier	September 30, 2006	Won	42–13	
5	Uruguay	Rio Tinto Stadium, Sandy	Test match	November 8, 2008	Won	43–9	
6	Canada	Ellerslie Rugby Park, Edmonton	2011 Rugby World Cup Qualifier	July 11, 2009	Lost	18–41	
7	Uruguay	Central Broward Regional Park, Lauderhill	2011 Rugby World Cup Qualifier	November 21, 2009	Won	27–6	
8	Uruguay	Central Broward Regional Park, Lauderhill	2011 Rugby World Cup Qualifier	November 21, 2009	Won	27–6	
9	Russia	Sixways Stadium, Worcester	2011 Churchill Cup	June 18, 2011	Won	32–25	
10	Canada	BMO Field, Toronto	Test match	August 6, 2011	Lost	22–28	
11	Canada	BMO Field, Toronto	Test match	August 6, 2011	Lost	22–28	
12	Canada	Dell Diamond; Round Rock	2016 Americas Rugby Championship	February 13, 2016	Won	30–22	
13	Canada	Dell Diamond; Round Rock	2016 Americas Rugby Championship	February 13, 2016	Won	30–22	
14	Canada	Dell Diamond; Round Rock	2016 Americas Rugby Championship	February 13, 2016	Won	30–22	
15	(Māori people) New Zealand Māori	Toyota Park; Bridgeview	Test match	November 4, 2016	Lost	7–54	
16	Canada	Swangard Stadium, Burnaby	2017 Americas Rugby Championship	February 18, 2017	Won	51–34	
17	Chile	Estadio San Carlos de Apoquindo, Las Condes	2017 Americas Rugby Championship	February 25, 2017	Won	57–9	

== See also ==
- United States national rugby union team
- United States national rugby sevens team
