= Alec Parker =

American rugby union player

- Born: Alec Parker; April 10, 1974 (age 52) Aspen, Colorado, U.S.
- Height: 1.98 m (6 ft 6 in)
- Weight: 111 kg (245 lb)

Rugby union career
- Position: Lock
- Current team: Gentlemen of Aspen
International career
Years	Team	Apps	(Points)
1996–2009	United States	58	(5)
- Correct as of 5 April 2020

Alec Parker (born April 10, 1974) is an American former rugby union lock. Parker was born in Aspen, Colorado. His height is 6 feet 6 inches (1.98 m).

He was a member of the United States national rugby union team and participated in three World Cups 2007 Rugby World Cup.
