= 2003 Rugby World Cup Pool B =

Pool B was one of four pools at the 2003 Rugby World Cup into which the 20 participating teams were divided. The pool included 1999 quarter-finalists France and Scotland, who both qualified automatically having reached the quarter-finals of the 1999 tournament, along with Fiji, the United States and Japan.

== Teams ==
Team	Method of qualification	Date of qualification	Apps.	Last	Previous best performance	IRB World Ranking (6 October 2003)
France	Quarter-finalists in 1999	16 October 1999	5th	1999	Runners-up (1987, 1999)	5
Scotland	Quarter-finalists in 1999	20 October 1999	5th	1999	Fourth place (1991)	9
Fiji	Oceania 1	28 June 2002	4th	1999	Quarter-finals (1987)	11
United States	Repechage 1	27 April 2003	4th	1999	Pool stage (1987, 1991, 1999)	14
Japan	Asia 1	14 July 2002	5th	1999	Pool stage (1987, 1991, 1995, 1999)	18

== Standings ==
Pos	Team	Pld	W	D	L	PF	PA	PD	B	Pts	Qualification
1	France	4	4	0	0	204	70	+134	4	20	Advance to quarter-finals, and qualification to the 2007 Rugby World Cup
2	Scotland	4	3	0	1	102	97	+5	2	14	Advance to quarter-finals, and qualification to the 2007 Rugby World Cup
3	Fiji	4	2	0	2	98	114	−16	2	10	Qualification to the 2007 Rugby World Cup
4	United States	4	1	0	3	86	125	−39	2	6	
5	Japan	4	0	0	4	79	163	−84	0	0	

In the quarter-finals:

- The winners of Pool B advanced to play the runners-up of Pool A.
- The runners-up of Pool B advanced to play the winners of Pool A.

== Matches ==
=== France vs Fiji ===
11 October 2003

France	61–18	Fiji
Try: Dominici (2); Harinordoquy; Jauzion (3); Ibañez; Con: Michalak (4); Pen: Michalak (6)	Report	Try: Naevo; Caucaunibuca; Con: Little; Pen: Little (2)

Suncorp Stadium, Brisbane
Attendance: 46,795
Referee: Alain Rolland (Ireland)

FB	15	Nicolas Brusque
RW	14	Aurélien Rougerie
OC	13	Tony Marsh
IC	12	Yannick Jauzion
LW	11	Christophe Dominici
FH	10	Frédéric Michalak
SH	9	Fabien Galthié (c)
N8	8	Imanol Harinordoquy
OF	7	Olivier Magne
BF	6	Serge Betsen
RL	5	Jérôme Thion
LL	4	Fabien Pelous
TP	3	Jean-Baptiste Poux
HK	2	Raphaël Ibañez
LP	1	Jean-Jacques Crenca
Replacements:
HK	16	Yannick Bru
PR	17	Olivier Milloud
LK	18	Olivier Brouzet
N8	19	Christian Labit
FH	20	Gérald Merceron
CE	21	Damien Traille
WG	22	Pépito Elhorga
Coach:
Bernard Laporte

FB	15	Norman Ligairi
RW	14	Vilimoni Delasau
OC	13	Aisea Tuilevu
IC	12	Seru Rabeni
LW	11	Rupeni Caucaunibuca
FH	10	Nicky Little
SH	9	Mosese Rauluni
N8	8	Alifereti Doviverata (c)
OF	7	Kitione Salawa
BF	6	Sisa Koyamaibole
RL	5	Apenisa Naevo
LL	4	Ifereimi Rawaqa
TP	3	Joeli Veitayaki
HK	2	Greg Smith
LP	1	Richard Nyholt
Replacements:
HK	16	Bill Gadolo
PR	17	Nacanieli Seru
LK	18	Kele Leawere
LK	19	Vula Maimuri
SH	20	Samisoni Rabaka
FH	21	Waisale Serevi
WG	22	Marika Vunibaka
Coach:
(New Zealand) Mac McCallion

=== Scotland vs Japan ===
12 October 2003

Scotland	32–11	Japan
Try: Paterson (2); Grimes; Taylor; Danielli; Con: Paterson; Townsend; Pen: Paterson	Report	Try: Onozawa; Pen: Hirose (2)

Dairy Farmers Stadium, Townsville
Attendance: 19,170
Referee: Stuart Dickinson (Australia)

FB	15	Ben Hinshelwood
RW	14	Chris Paterson
OC	13	Andy Craig
IC	12	James McLaren
LW	11	Kenny Logan
FH	10	Gordon Ross
SH	9	Bryan Redpath (c)
N8	8	Jon Petrie
OF	7	Simon Taylor
BF	6	Jason White
RL	5	Stuart Grimes
LL	4	Scott Murray
TP	3	Bruce Douglas
HK	2	Robbie Russell
LP	1	Tom Smith
Replacements:
HK	16	Gordon Bulloch
PR	17	Gavin Kerr
FL	18	Ross Beattie
FL	19	Martin Leslie
SH	20	Mike Blair
FH	21	Gregor Townsend
WG	22	Simon Danielli
Coach:
Ian McGeechan

FB	15	Tsutomu Matsuda
RW	14	Daisuke Ohata
OC	13	Reuben Parkinson
IC	12	Yukio Motoki
LW	11	Hirotoki Onozawa
FH	10	Keiji Hirose
SH	9	Takashi Tsuji
N8	8	Takeomi Ito
OF	7	Takuro Miuchi (c)
BF	6	Naoya Okubo
RL	5	Adam Parker
LL	4	Hajime Kiso
TP	3	Masahiko Toyoyama
HK	2	Masao Amino
LP	1	Shin Hasegawa
Replacements:
PR	16	Masahito Yamamoto
HK	17	Masaaki Sakata
LK	18	Hiroyuki Tanuma
FL	19	Yasunori Watanabe
SH	20	Yuji Sonoda
FH	21	Andrew Miller
WG	22	Toru Kurihara
Coach:
Shogo Mukai

=== Fiji vs United States ===
15 October 2003

Fiji	19–18	United States
Try: Naevo; Con: Little; Pen: Little (4)	Report	Try: Van Zyl; Schubert; Con: Hercus; Pen: Hercus (2)

Suncorp Stadium, Brisbane
Attendance: 30,990
Referee: Joël Jutge (France)

FB	15	Alfred Uluinayau
RW	14	Marika Vunibaka
OC	13	Aisea Tuilevu
IC	12	Seru Rabeni
LW	11	Vilimoni Delasau
FH	10	Nicky Little
SH	9	Mosese Rauluni
N8	8	Alifereti Doviverata (c)
OF	7	Koli Sewabu
BF	6	Alfie Mocelutu
RL	5	Apenisa Naevo
LL	4	Ifereimi Rawaqa
TP	3	Joeli Veitayaki
HK	2	Greg Smith
LP	1	Nacanieli Seru
Replacements:
HK	16	Bill Gadolo
PR	17	Richard Nyholt
LK	18	Vula Maimuri
FL	19	Sisa Koyamaibole
FH	20	Waisale Serevi
CE	21	Epeli Ruivadra
FB	22	Norman Ligairi
Coach:
(New Zealand) Mac McCallion

FB	15	Paul Emerick
RW	14	David Fee
OC	13	Philip Eloff
IC	12	Kain Cross
LW	11	Riaan van Zyl
FH	10	Mike Hercus
SH	9	Kevin Dalzell
N8	8	Dan Lyle
OF	7	Dave Hodges (c)
BF	6	Kort Schubert
RL	5	Luke Gross
LL	4	Alec Parker
TP	3	Dan Dorsey
HK	2	Kirk Khasigian
LP	1	Mike MacDonald
Replacements:
HK	16	Matt Wyatt
PR	17	John Tarpoff
LK	18	Gerhard Klerck
FL	19	Jurie Gouws
SH	20	Kimball Kjar
CE	21	Salesi Sika
FB	22	John Buchholz
Coach:
Tom Billups

=== France vs Japan ===
18 October 2003

France	51–29	Japan
Try: Michalak; Rougerie (2); Pelous; Dominici; Crenca; Con: Michalak (5); Merceron; Pen: Michalak (3)	Report	Try: Konia; Ohata; Con: Kurihara (2); Pen: Kurihara (5)

Dairy Farmers Stadium, Townsville
Attendance: 21,309
Referee: Alan Lewis (Ireland)

FB	15	Clément Poitrenaud
RW	14	Aurélien Rougerie
OC	13	Tony Marsh
IC	12	Damien Traille
LW	11	Christophe Dominici
FH	10	Frédéric Michalak
SH	9	Fabien Galthié (c)
N8	8	Christian Labit
OF	7	Olivier Magne
BF	6	Serge Betsen
RL	5	Olivier Brouzet
LL	4	Fabien Pelous
TP	3	Jean-Baptiste Poux
HK	2	Yannick Bru
LP	1	Olivier Milloud
Replacements:
HK	16	Raphaël Ibañez
PR	17	Jean-Jacques Crenca
LK	18	David Auradou
FL	19	Sébastien Chabal
FH	20	Gérald Merceron
CE	21	Yannick Jauzion
WG	22	Pépito Elhorga
Coach:
Bernard Laporte

FB	15	Toru Kurihara
RW	14	Daisuke Ohata
OC	13	George Konia
IC	12	Hideki Nanba
LW	11	Hirotoki Onozawa
FH	10	Andrew Miller
SH	9	Yuji Sonoda
N8	8	Takeomi Ito
OF	7	Takuro Miuchi (c)
BF	6	Naoya Okubo
RL	5	Adam Parker
LL	4	Hiroyuki Tanuma
TP	3	Ryō Yamamura
HK	2	Masaaki Sakata
LP	1	Shin Hasegawa
Replacements:
PR	16	Masahito Yamamoto
HK	17	Masao Amino
LK	18	Koichi Kubo
FL	19	Ryota Asano
SH	20	Takashi Tsuji
CE	21	Yukio Motoki
FB	22	Takashi Yoshida
Coach:
Shogo Mukai

=== Scotland vs United States ===
20 October 2003

Scotland	39–15	United States
Try: Danielli (2); Kerr; Townsend; Paterson; Con: Paterson (4); Pen: Paterson (2)	Report	Pen: Hercus (5)

Suncorp Stadium, Brisbane
Attendance: 46,796
Referee: Jonathan Kaplan (South Africa)

FB	15	Glenn Metcalfe
RW	14	Simon Danielli
OC	13	Andy Craig
IC	12	Andrew Henderson
LW	11	Chris Paterson
FH	10	Gregor Townsend
SH	9	Mike Blair
N8	8	Jon Petrie
OF	7	Simon Taylor
BF	6	Ross Beattie
RL	5	Stuart Grimes
LL	4	Nathan Hines
TP	3	Gavin Kerr
HK	2	Gordon Bulloch (c)
LP	1	Tom Smith
Replacements:
HK	16	Robbie Russell
PR	17	Bruce Douglas
LK	18	Jason White
FL	19	Martin Leslie
SH	20	Bryan Redpath
CE	21	Ben Hinshelwood
WG	22	Kenny Logan
Coach:
Ian McGeechan

FB	15	Paul Emerick
RW	14	David Fee
OC	13	Philip Eloff
IC	12	Kain Cross
LW	11	Riaan van Zyl
FH	10	Mike Hercus
SH	9	Kevin Dalzell
N8	8	Dan Lyle
OF	7	Dave Hodges (c)
BF	6	Kort Schubert
RL	5	Luke Gross
LL	4	Alec Parker
TP	3	Dan Dorsey
HK	2	Kirk Khasigian
LP	1	Mike MacDonald
Replacements:
HK	16	Matt Wyatt
PR	17	Richard Liddington
FL	18	Jurie Gouws
FL	19	Oloseti Fifita
SH	20	Kimball Kjar
WG	21	Jason Keyter
FH	22	Link Wilfley
Coach:
Tom Billups

=== Fiji vs Japan ===
23 October 2003

Fiji	41–13	Japan
Try: Tuilevu (2); Ligairi (2); Vunibaka; Con: Little (2); Pen: Little (4)	Report	Try: Miller; Con: Miller; Pen: Miller; Drop: Miller

Dairy Farmers Stadium, Townsville
Attendance: 17,269
Referee: Nigel Williams (Wales)

FB	15	Norman Ligairi
RW	14	Aisea Tuilevu
OC	13	Epeli Ruivadra
IC	12	Seru Rabeni
LW	11	Vilimoni Delasau
FH	10	Waisale Serevi
SH	9	Samisoni Rabaka
N8	8	Alfie Mocelutu
OF	7	Koli Sewabu
BF	6	Alifereti Doviverata
RL	5	Emori Katalau
LL	4	Kele Leawere
TP	3	Isaia Rasila
HK	2	Greg Smith
LP	1	Nacanieli Seru
Replacements:
HK	16	Bill Gadolo
PR	17	Joeli Veitayaki
FL	18	Sisa Koyamaibole
LK	19	Vula Maimuri
SH	20	Mosese Rauluni
FH	21	Nicky Little
WG	22	Marika Vunibaka
Coach:
(New Zealand) Mac McCallion

FB	15	Tsutomu Matsuda
RW	14	Daisuke Ohata
OC	13	Reuben Parkinson
IC	12	Yukio Motoki
LW	11	Hirotoki Onozawa
FH	10	Andrew Miller
SH	9	Takashi Tsuji
N8	8	Takeomi Ito
OF	7	Takuro Miuchi (c)
BF	6	Naoya Okubo
RL	5	Adam Parker
LL	4	Hajime Kiso
TP	3	Masahiko Toyoyama
HK	2	Masaaki Sakata
LP	1	Masahito Yamamoto
Replacements:
PR	16	Shin Hasegawa
HK	17	Masao Amino
LK	18	Koichi Kubo
FL	19	Ryota Asano
SH	20	Yuji Sonoda
CE	21	George Konia
WG	22	Toru Kurihara
Coach:
Shogo Mukai

=== France vs Scotland ===
25 October 2003

France	51–9	Scotland
Try: Betsen; Harinordoquy; Michalak; Galthié; Brusque; Con: Michalak (3); Merceron; Pen: Michalak (4); Drop: Michalak; Brusque	Report	Pen: Paterson (3)

Stadium Australia, Sydney
Attendance: 78,974
Referee: David McHugh (Ireland)

FB	15	Nicolas Brusque
RW	14	Aurélien Rougerie
OC	13	Tony Marsh
IC	12	Yannick Jauzion
LW	11	Christophe Dominici
FH	10	Frédéric Michalak
SH	9	Fabien Galthié
N8	8	Imanol Harinordoquy
OF	7	Olivier Magne
BF	6	Serge Betsen
RL	5	Jérôme Thion
LL	4	Fabien Pelous
TP	3	Sylvain Marconnet
HK	2	Raphaël Ibañez
LP	1	Jean-Jacques Crenca
Replacements:
HK	16	Yannick Bru
PR	17	Olivier Milloud
LK	18	Olivier Brouzet
FL	19	Patrick Tabacco
FH	20	Gérald Merceron
CE	21	Damien Traille
WG	22	Pépito Elhorga
Coach:
Bernard Laporte

FB	15	Glenn Metcalfe
RW	14	Chris Paterson
OC	13	Andy Craig
IC	12	Andrew Henderson
LW	11	Kenny Logan
FH	10	Gregor Townsend
SH	9	Bryan Redpath
N8	8	Cameron Mather
OF	7	Simon Taylor
BF	6	Jason White
RL	5	Stuart Grimes
LL	4	Scott Murray
TP	3	Gavin Kerr
HK	2	Gordon Bulloch
LP	1	Tom Smith
Replacements:
HK	16	Robbie Russell
PR	17	Bruce Douglas
LK	18	Nathan Hines
FL	19	Ross Beattie
SH	20	Mike Blair
CE	21	James McLaren
WG	22	Simon Danielli
Coach:
Ian McGeechan

=== Japan vs United States ===
27 October 2003

Japan	26–39	United States
Try: Kurihara; Ohata; Con: Kurihara (2); Pen: Kurihara (4)	Report	Try: Hercus; Eloff; Schubert; Van Zyl; Khasigian; Con: Hercus (4); Pen: Hercus (2)

Central Coast Stadium, Gosford
Attendance: 19,653
Referee: Steve Walsh (New Zealand)

FB	15	Tsutomu Matsuda
RW	14	Daisuke Ohata
OC	13	George Konia
IC	12	Yukio Motoki
LW	11	Toru Kurihara
FH	10	Andrew Miller
SH	9	Yuji Sonoda
N8	8	Takeomi Ito
OF	7	Takuro Miuchi (c)
BF	6	Naoya Okubo
RL	5	Hajime Kiso
LL	4	Adam Parker
TP	3	Masahiko Toyoyama
HK	2	Masao Amino
LP	1	Shin Hasegawa
Replacements:
PR	16	Masahito Yamamoto
HK	17	Masaaki Sakata
LK	18	Koichi Kubo
N8	19	Yuya Saito
SH	20	Takashi Tsuji
CE	21	Hideki Nanba
WG	22	Hirotoki Onozawa
Coach:
Shogo Mukai

FB	15	Paul Emerick
RW	14	David Fee
OC	13	Philip Eloff
IC	12	Salesi Sika
LW	11	Riaan van Zyl
FH	10	Mike Hercus
SH	9	Kevin Dalzell
N8	8	Dan Lyle
OF	7	Dave Hodges
BF	6	Kort Schubert
RL	5	Luke Gross
LL	4	Gerhard Klerck
TP	3	Dan Dorsey
HK	2	Kirk Khasigian
LP	1	Mike MacDonald
Replacements:
HK	16	Matt Wyatt
PR	17	Jacob Waasdorp
LK	18	Jurie Gouws
FL	19	Oloseti Fifita
SH	20	Kimball Kjar
WG	21	Jason Keyter
FB	22	John Buchholz
Coach:
Tom Billups

=== France vs United States ===
31 October 2003

France	41–14	United States
Try: Liebenberg (3); Poux; Bru; Con: Merceron (2); Pen: Merceron (3); Drop: Yachvili	Report	Try: Hercus; Schubert; Con: Hercus (2)

WIN Stadium, Wollongong
Attendance: 17,833
Referee: Paul Honiss (New Zealand)

FB	15	Clément Poitrenaud
RW	14	Pépito Elhorga
OC	13	Brian Liebenberg
IC	12	Damien Traille
LW	11	David Bory
FH	10	Gérald Merceron
SH	9	Dimitri Yachvili
N8	8	Christian Labit
OF	7	Patrick Tabacco
BF	6	Sébastien Chabal
RL	5	Olivier Brouzet (c)
LL	4	David Auradou
TP	3	Jean-Baptiste Poux
HK	2	Yannick Bru
LP	1	Olivier Milloud
Replacements:
HK	16	Raphaël Ibañez
PR	17	Sylvain Marconnet
LK	18	Jérôme Thion
FL	19	Olivier Magne
FH	20	Frédéric Michalak
CE	21	Yannick Jauzion
WG	22	Aurélien Rougerie
Coach:
Bernard Laporte

FB	15	John Buchholz
RW	14	David Fee
OC	13	Philip Eloff
IC	12	Salesi Sika
LW	11	Riaan van Zyl
FH	10	Mike Hercus
SH	9	Kevin Dalzell
N8	8	Dan Lyle
OF	7	Dave Hodges (c)
BF	6	Kort Schubert
RL	5	Luke Gross
LL	4	Alec Parker
TP	3	Dan Dorsey
HK	2	Kirk Khasigian
LP	1	Mike MacDonald
Replacements:
HK	16	Matt Wyatt
PR	17	Jacob Waasdorp
LK	18	Gerhard Klerck
FL	19	Jurie Gouws
FH	20	Matt Sherman
WG	21	Jason Keyter
SH	22	Mose Timoteo
Coach:
Tom Billups

=== Scotland vs Fiji ===
1 November 2003

Scotland	22–20	Fiji
Try: Smith; Con: Paterson; Pen: Paterson (5)	Report	Try: Caucaunibuca (2); Con: Little (2); Pen: Little (2)

Aussie Stadium, Sydney
Attendance: 37,137
Referee: Tony Spreadbury (England)

FB	15	Glenn Metcalfe
RW	14	Simon Danielli
OC	13	Gregor Townsend
IC	12	Andrew Henderson
LW	11	Kenny Logan
FH	10	Chris Paterson
SH	9	Bryan Redpath (c)
N8	8	Simon Taylor
OF	7	Cameron Mather
BF	6	Ross Beattie
RL	5	Stuart Grimes
LL	4	Nathan Hines
TP	3	Bruce Douglas
HK	2	Gordon Bulloch
LP	1	Tom Smith
Replacements:
HK	16	Robbie Russell
PR	17	Gordon McIlwham
FL	18	Jason White
N8	19	Jon Petrie
SH	20	Mike Blair
CE	21	James McLaren
CE	22	Ben Hinshelwood
Coach:
Ian McGeechan

FB	15	Norman Ligairi
RW	14	Aisea Tuilevu
OC	13	Epeli Ruivadra
IC	12	Seru Rabeni
LW	11	Rupeni Caucaunibuca
FH	10	Nicky Little
SH	9	Mosese Rauluni
N8	8	Vula Maimuri
OF	7	Koli Sewabu
BF	6	Alifereti Doviverata (c)
RL	5	Ifereimi Rawaqa
LL	4	Apenisa Naevo
TP	3	Isaia Rasila
HK	2	Greg Smith
LP	1	Joeli Veitayaki
Replacements:
PR	16	Nacanieli Seru
N8	17	Setareki Tawake
FL	18	Sisa Koyamaibole
FL	19	Kitione Salawa
SH	20	Jacob Rauluni
CE	21	Isa Nacewa
WG	22	Vilimoni Delasau
Coach:
(New Zealand) Mac McCallion
