= 2003 Fiji rugby union tours =

Summary
P	W	D	L
Total
8	6	0	2
Test match
2	1	0	1
Opponent
P	W	D	L
Argentina
1	0	0	1
Chile
1	1	0	0

The 2003 Fiji rugby union tours were two series of matches played between June and August 2003 in Australia, New Zealand and South America by the Fiji national rugby union team.

The matches were played in two different periods: in June in Australia (no test match) and in August in New Zealand (no test) and South America (two full international matches).

== In Australia ==
21 June 2003

ACT Brumbies 2nd XV	26–25	Fiji XV

Bruce Stadium, Canberra

29 June 2003

Queensland A	24–31	Fiji XV

Ballymore, Brisbane

== In New Zealand ==
3 August 2003

Canterbury Dev. XV	17–46	Fiji XV

Christchurch

6 August 2003

Canterbury Dev. XV	38–41	Fiji XV

Christchurch

9 August 2003

Marlborough	12–75	Fiji XV

Blenheim

== In South America ==
13 August 2003

Uruguay	3–24	Fiji XV

Montevideo

18 August 2003

Argentina	49–30	Fiji
Try: Durand, Fernández Miranda; Roncero 2, Scelzo 2 Stortoni; Con: Fernández Miranda 4 Pen: Fernández Miranda 2		Try: Caucaunibuca, Koyamaibole; Tuilevu Kurimudu; Con: Little 2, Serevi; Pen: Little 3

Chateau Carreras, Córdoba
Referee: Chris White (England)

Argentina: Bernardo Stortoni, 14. Hernán Senillosa, 13. Manuel Contepomi, 12. Martín Gaitán, 11. Ignacio Corleto, 10. Juan Fernández Miranda, 9. Matías Albina, 8. Rodrigo Roncero, 7. Federico Méndez, 6. Martín Scelzo, 5. Mariano Sambucetti, 4. Santiago Phelan (yellow card) , 3. Rimas Álvarez Kairelis, 2. Martín Schusterman, 1. Gonzalo Longo (c) – Replacements: Martín Durand, Pedro Sporleder, Mauricio Reggiardo – Unused: Agustín Pichot, Gonzalo Quesada, José Orengo

Fiji: 15. Norman Ligairi, 14. Sekove Leawere, 13. Aisea Tuilevu Kurimudu, 12. Seru Rabeni, 11. Rupeni Caucaunibuca, 10. Nicky Little, 9. Moses Rauluni, 8. Alfi Mocelutu Vuivau (yellow card) , 7. Kitione Salawa, 6. Sisa Koyamaibole, 5. Kele Leawere, 4. Emori Katalau (c), 3. Joeli Veitayaki, 2. Bill Gadolo, 1. Richard Nyholt – Replacements: 16. Naka Seru, 17. Isaia Rasila, 18. Ifereimi Rawaqa, 19. Koli Sewabu, 20. Vula Maimuri, 21. Waisale Serevi

24 August 2003

Chile	16–41	Fiji

Santiago
