= 2004 France rugby union tour of North America =

Summary
P	W	D	L
Total
2	2	0	0
Test match
2	2	0	0
Opponent
P	W	D	L
United States
1	1	0	0
Canada
1	1	0	0

Tour chronology
- ← Argentina & New Zealand 2003 South Africa & Australia 2005 →

The 2004 France rugby union tour of North America was a series of matches played in July 2004 in Canada and in the United States by France national rugby union team.

== Matches ==
3 July 2004

United States	31–39	France
Try: Hercus, Mo'unga; Naivalu, Paga van Zyl; Con: Hercus 3		Try: Barrau, de Villiers; Lièvremont, Tabacco; Valbon; Con: Peclier 4 Pen: Peclier 2

Dillon Stadium, Hartford
Attendance: 6,000
Referee: Giulio De Santis (Italy)

United States: 15. Francois Viljoen, 14. Jovesa Naivalu, 13. Paul Emerick, 12. Salesi Sika, 11. David Fee, 10. Mike Hercus, 9. Mose Timoteo, 8. Shaun Paga, 7. Tony Petruzzella, 6. Kort Schubert (c), 5. Matt Kane, 4. Dave Hodges, 3. Jacob Waasdorp, 2. Matt Wyatt, 1. Mike MacDonald – Replacements: 16. Mark Griffin, 17. Dan Dorsey, 18. Brian Surgener, 19. Tasi Mo'unga, 20. David Williams, 22. Riaan van Zyl – Unused: 21. Kain Cross
France: 15. Clément Poitrenaud, 14. Aurélien Rougerie, 13. Ludovic Valbon, 12. Brian Liebenberg, 11. Cédric Heymans, 10. Alexandre Peclier, 9. Mathieu Barrau, 8. Thomas Lièvremont, 7. Patrick Tabacco, 6. Yannick Nyanga, 5. David Couzinet, 4. Fabien Pelous (c), 3. Pieter de Villiers, 2. William Servat, 1. Olivier Milloud – Replacements: 18. Romain Froment, 19. Pierre Rabadan – Unused: 16. Dimitri Szarzewski, 17. David Attoub, 20. Ludovic Loustau, 21. Julien Peyrelongue

10 July 2004

Canada	13–47	France
Try: Richmond; Con: Barker; Pen: Barker 2		Try: Goutta, Liebenberg; Lièvremont, Poitrenaud; Rougerie; Con: Peclier 5 Pen: Peclier 3, Peyrelongue

York Stadium, Toronto
Attendance: 8,000
Referee: D. Turner (South Africa)

Canada: 15. Quentin Fyffe, 14. Marco di Girolamo, 13. Ryan Smith, 12. John Cannon, 11. Stirling Richmond, 10. Jared Barker, 9. Morgan Williams, 8. Stan McKeen, 7. Mike Webb, 6. Phil Murphy, 5. Jamie Cudmore, 4. Colin Yukes, 3. Forrest Gainer, 2. Aaron Abrams, 1. Kevin Tkachuk (c) – Replacements: 16. Mark Lawson, 17. Jon Thiel, 18. Mike Burak, 19. Jim Douglas, 20. Ed Fairhurst, 21. Mike Danskin, 22. Derek Daypuck
France: 15. Clément Poitrenaud, 14. Philippe Bidabé, 13. Tony Marsh, 12. Brian Liebenberg, 11. Aurélien Rougerie, 10. Alexandre Peclier, 9. Ludovic Loustau, 8. Thomas Lièvremont, 7. Bernard Goutta, 6. Yannick Nyanga, 5. Pascal Papé, 4. Fabien Pelous (c), 3. Pieter de Villiers, 2. William Servat, 1. Arnaud Martinez – Replacements: 16. Dimitri Szarzewski, 17. Olivier Milloud, 18. David Couzinet, 19. Pierre Rabadan, 20. Mathieu Barrau, 21. Julien Peyrelongue, 22. Cédric Heymans
