= 2002 Scotland rugby union tour of North America =

Rugby match series disputed by the national team of Scotland

Summary
P	W	D	L
Total
6	5	0	1
Test match
2	1	0	1
Opponent
P	W	D	L
Canada
1	0	0	1
United States
1	1	0	0

The 2002 Scotland rugby union tour of North America was a series of matches played in June 2002 in North America by Scotland national rugby union team.

== Results ==
'Scores and results list Scotland's points tally first.

Opponent	For	Against	Date	Venue	Status
Canada East	38	8	6 June 2002	Toronto	Tour match
Canada XV	33	8	8 June 2002	Toronto	Tour match
West Canada	24	9	12 June 2002	Victoria	Tour match
Canada	23	26	15 June 2002	Vancouver	Test match
United States A	24	8	18 June 2002	Portland	Tour match
United States	65	23	22 June 2002	San Francisco	Test match

== First test ==
15 June 2002

Canada	26–23	Scotland
Try: Murphy, Thiel; Con: Barker (2); Pen: Barker (4)		Try: Blair, Paterson, Taylor; Con: Laney; Pen: Laney (2)

Vancouver
Referee: David McHugh (Ireland)

Canada: 15. Winston Stanley, 14. Fred Asselin, 13. Nik Witkowski, 12. John Cannon, 11. Sean Fauth, 10. Jared Barker, 9. Morgan Williams, 8. Phil Murphy, 7. Dan Baugh, 6. Ryan Banks, 5. Mike James, 4. Al Charron (yellow card) , 3. Jon Thiel, 2. Pat Dunkley, 1. Rod Snow – Replacements: 19. Colin Yukes, 18. Ed Knaggs, 22. Kyle Nichols, 17. Kevin Wirachowski – Unused: Harry Toews, Ed Fairhurst, Bobby Ross
Scotland: 15. Glenn Metcalfe, 14. Rory Kerr, 13. Andy Craig, 12. Brendan Laney, 11. Chris Paterson, 10. Duncan Hodge, 9. Mike Blair, 8. Jon Petrie, 7. Simon Taylor, 6. Jason White, 5. Stuart Grimes (c), 4. Nathan Hines, 3. Craig Smith, 2. Gordon Bulloch, 1. Mattie Stewart – Replacements: 16. Steve Brotherstone, 17. Allan Jacobsen, 18. Graeme Burns, 19. Donnie Macfadyen, 20. Andy Hall, 21. Ben Hinshelwood, 22. Marcus Di Rollo

== Second test ==
22 June 2002

United States	23–65	Scotland
Try: Keyter, Timoteo; Con: Wilfley (2); Pen: Wilfley (3)		Try: Craig, Henderson; Hines, Hodge (2); Kerr, Laney; Paterson (2), White; Con: Laney (6); Pen: Laney

Boxer Stadium, San Francisco
Referee: Pablo Deluca (Argentina)

United States: 15. John Buchholz, 14. Mose Timoteo, 13. Phillip Eloff, 12. Link Wilfley, 11. Jason Keyter, 10. Mike Hercus, 9. Kevin Dalzell, 8. Dave Hodges (c), 7. Kort Schubert, 6. Aaron Satchwell, 5. Luke Gross, 4. Eric Reed (yellow card) , 3. Dan Dorsey, 2. Kirk Khasigian, 1. Mike MacDonald – Replacements: 16.Dan Anderson, 17. Andy McGarry 18. John Tarpoff 19. Conrad Hodgson20. Kimball Kjar22. Jone Naqica – Unused: Riaan Hamilton
Scotland: 15. Glenn Metcalfe, 14. Rory Kerr, 13. Andy Craig, 12. Brendan Laney, 11. Chris Paterson, 10. Duncan Hodge, 9. Mike Blair, 8. Simon Taylor, 7. Donnie Macfadyen, 6. Jason White, 5. Stuart Grimes (c), 4. Nathan Hines, 3. Mattie Stewart, 2. Gordon Bulloch, 1. Allan Jacobsen – Replacements: 16. Steve Scott, 17. Craig Smith, 18. Andy Hall, 20. Graeme Burns, 21. Andrew Henderson, 22. Marcus Di Rollo – Unused: Ally Hogg
