= Fiji at the Rugby World Cup =

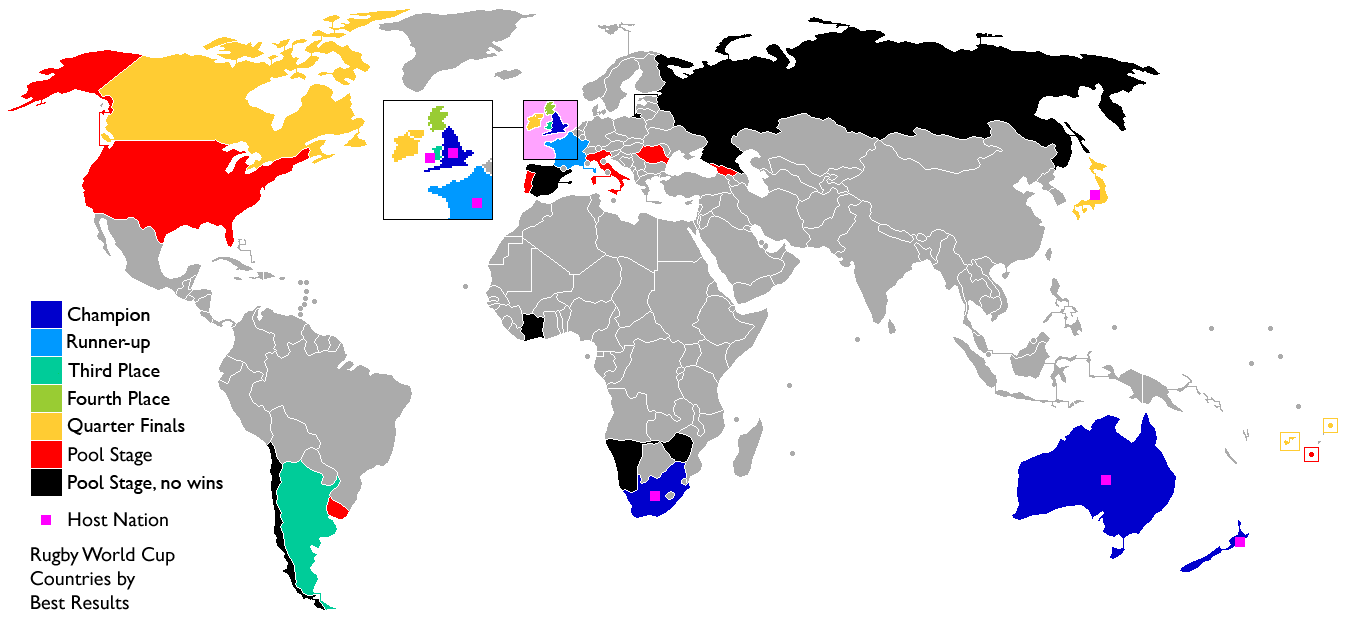
Map of nations best results, excluding nations which unsuccessfully participated in qualifying tournaments.

The Fiji national rugby union team has played in all Rugby World Cup tournaments, except in 1995, when they did not qualify. Their best performances have seen them become quarterfinalists in 1987, the 2007 and 2023.

Nation	Number of appearances	First appearance	Most recent appearance	Streak	Best result
Fiji	9	1987	2023	7	Quarter finals 1987, 2007, 2023

== By position ==
Rugby World Cup record									Qualification						
Year	Round	Pld	W	D	L	PF	PA	Squad	Pos	Pld	W	D	L	PF	PA
(New Zealand) (Australia) 1987	Quarter-finals	4	1	0	3	72	132	Squad	Invited						
(England) (France) (Ireland) (Scotland) (Wales) 1991	Pool Stage	3	0	0	3	27	63	Squad	Automatically qualified						
(South Africa) 1995	Did not qualify								P/O	2	1	0	1	26	34
(Wales) 1999	QF play-offs	4	2	0	2	148	113	Squad	2nd	5	4	0	1	151	116
(Australia) 2003	Pool Stage	4	2	0	2	98	114	Squad	1st	4	3	0	1	123	80
(France) 2007	Quarter-finals	5	3	0	2	134	173	Squad	2nd	4	3	0	1	74	83
(New Zealand) 2011	Pool Stage	4	1	0	3	59	167	Squad	Automatically qualified						
(England) 2015	Pool Stage	4	1	0	3	84	101	Squad	P/O	1	1	0	0	108	6
(Japan) 2019	Pool Stage	4	1	0	3	110	108	Squad	1st	4	4	0	0	101	60
(France) 2023	Quarter-finals	5	2	0	3	112	113	Squad	Automatically qualified						
(Australia) 2027	Qualified								Automatically qualified						
(United States) 2031	To be determined								To be determined						
Total	—	37	13	0	24	844	1084	—	—	20	16	0	4	583	379
Champions; Runners–up; Third place; Fourth place; Home venue

== By match ==
=== 1987 Rugby World Cup ===
Pool 3 games –

Team	Pld	W	D	L	PF	PA	PD	T	Pts	Qualification
New Zealand	3	3	0	0	190	34	+156	30	6	Knockout stage
Fiji	3	1	0	2	56	101	−45	6	2 (Note: Fiji qualified for the highest number of tries (Fiji 6, Italy 5, Argentina 4))	Knockout stage
Italy	3	1	0	2	40	110	−70	5	2	
Argentina	3	1	0	2	49	90	−41	4	2	

Notes:

24 May 1987

Argentina	9–28	Fiji
Try: Penalty try Con: Porta; Pen: Porta	Report	Try: Gale; Naivilawasa; Nalaga; Savai; Con: Koroduadua (2); Rokowailoa; Pen: Koroduadua (2)

Rugby Park, Hamilton
Attendance: 13,000
Referee: Jim Fleming (Scotland)

27 May 1987

New Zealand	74–13	Fiji
Try: Gallagher (4); Green (4); Kirk; Kirwan; Penalty try Whetton; Con: Fox (10); Pen: Fox (2)	Report	Try: Cama; Pen: Koroduadua (3)

Lancaster Park, Christchurch
Attendance: 25,000
Referee: Derek Bevan (Wales)

31 May 1987

Fiji	15–18	Italy
Try: Naivilawasa; Con: Koroduadua; Pen: Koroduadua (2); Drop: Qoro		Try: Cuttitta; Cucchiella; Mascioletti; Pen: Collodo; Drop: Collodo

Carisbrook, Dunedin
Attendance: 13,000
Referee: Keith Lawrence (New Zealand)

Quarter final

7 June 1987

Fiji	16–31	France
Tries: Qoro; Damu; Con: Koroduadua; Pen: Koroduadua (2)		Tries: Rodriguez (2); Lorieux; Lagisquet; Con: Laporte (3); Pen: Laporte (2); Drop: Laporte

Eden Park, Auckland
Referee: Clive Norling (Wales)

=== 1991 Rugby World Cup ===
Pool 4 games –

Team	Pld	W	D	L	PF	PA	PD	Pts
France	3	3	0	0	82	25	+57	6
Canada	3	2	0	1	45	33	+12	4
Romania	3	1	0	2	31	64	−33	2
Fiji	3	0	0	3	27	63	−36	0

5 October 1991

Canada	13–3	Fiji
Tries: Stewart; Pen: Rees (3)		Drop: Serevi

Stade Jean Dauger, Bayonne
Referee: Kerry Fitzgerald (Australia)

8 October 1991

France	33–9	Fiji
Tries: Lafond (3), Sella (2), Camberabero; Con: Camberabero (3); Pen: Camberabero		Tries: Naruma; Con: Koroduadua; Pen: Koroduadua

Stade Lesdiguières, Grenoble
Referee: Derek Bevan (Wales)

12 October 1991

Fiji	15–17	Romania
Pen: Turuva (2); Drop: Rabaka (2), Turuva		Tries: Ion, Dumitras, Sasu; Con: Răcean; Pen: Nichitean

Parc Municipal des Sports, Brive
Referee: Owen Doyle (Republic of Ireland)

=== 1999 Rugby World Cup ===
Pool 3 games –

Team	Pld	W	D	L	PF	PA	PD	Pts
France	3	3	0	0	108	52	+56	9
Fiji	3	2	0	1	124	68	+56	7
Canada	3	1	0	2	114	82	+32	5
Namibia	3	0	0	3	42	186	−144	3

1 October 1999
21:00 CEST/GMT+2 (UTC+02)

Fiji	67–18	Namibia
Try: Lasagavibau (2); S. Tawake; Rauluni; Satala; Mocelutu; Smith; Tiko; Katalau; Con: Serevi (8); Pen: Serevi (2)		Try: Jacobs; Senekal; Con: Van Dyk; Pen: Van Dyk (2)

Stade de la Méditerranée, Béziers
Attendance: 10,000
Referee: David McHugh (Ireland)

9 October 1999
13:30 CEST/GMT+2 (UTC+02)

Fiji	38–22	Canada
Try: Satala (2); Vunibaka; Lasagavibau; Con: Little (3); Pen: Little (3); Drop: Little		Try: James; Con: Rees; Pen: Rees (4); Drop: Rees

Parc Lescure, Bordeaux
Attendance: 27,000
Referee: Ed Morrison (England)

16 October 1999
14:00 CEST/GMT+2 (UTC+02)

France	28–19	Fiji
Try: Juillet; Dominici; Penalty try Con: Dourthe (2); Pen: Dourthe (2); Lamaison		Try: Uluinayau; Con: Little; Pen: Little (4)

Stade de Toulouse
Attendance: 36,000
Referee: Paddy O'Brien (New Zealand)

Quarter-final play-offs –

20 October 1999
13:00 WEST/GMT+1 (UTC+01)

England	45–24	Fiji
Try: Luger; Back; Beal; Greening; Con: Dawson; Wilkinson; Pen: Wilkinson (7)	Report	Try: Satala; Nakauta; Tiko; Con: Little (3); Pen: Serevi

Twickenham, London
Attendance: 55,000
Referee: Clayton Thomas (Wales)

=== 2003 Rugby World Cup ===
Group B games –

Team	Pld	W	D	L	PF	PA	PD	BP	Pts	Qualification
France	4	4	0	0	204	70	+134	4	20	Quarter-finals
Scotland	4	3	0	1	102	97	+5	2	14	Quarter-finals
Fiji	4	2	0	2	98	114	−16	2	10	
United States	4	1	0	3	86	125	−39	2	6	
Japan	4	0	0	4	79	163	−84	0	0	

11 October 2003

France	61–18	Fiji
Tries: Dominici (2), Harinordoquy, Jauzion (3), Ibañez; Con: Michalak (4); Pen: Michalak (6)		Tries: Naevo, Caucaunibuca; Con: Little; Pen: Little (2)

Suncorp Stadium, Brisbane
Attendance: 46,795
Referee: Alain Rolland (Republic of Ireland)

15 October 2003

Fiji	19–18	United States
Tries: Naevo; Con: Little; Pen: Little (4)		Tries: van Zyl, Schubert; Con: Hercus; Pen: Hercus (2)

Suncorp Stadium, Brisbane
Attendance: 30,990
Referee: Joël Jutge (France)

23 October 2003

Fiji	41–13	Japan
Tries: Tuilevu (2), Ligairi (2), Vunibaka; Con: Little (2); Pen: Little (4)		Tries: Miller; Con: Miller; Pen: Miller; Drop: Miller

Dairy Farmers Stadium, Townsville
Attendance: 17,269
Referee: Nigel Whitehouse (Wales)

1 November 2003

Scotland	22–20	Fiji
Tries: Smith; Con: Paterson; Pen: Paterson (5)		Tries: Caucaunibuca (2); Con: Little (2); Pen: Little (2)

Sydney Football Stadium, Sydney
Attendance: 37,137
Referee: Tony Spreadbury (England)

=== 2007 Rugby World Cup ===
Fiji were placed in Pool B of the 2007 Rugby World Cup along with Wales, Canada, Japan and Australia. After beating Japan and Canada in close matches, Fiji rested several key players against Australia for the crucial game against Wales. Australia defeated Fiji 55–12. Fiji's fate in the tournament came down to a "winner advances" game against Wales which Fiji won 38–34 and qualified for the quarter-finals for the second time. Former Wallaby great Michael Lynagh described the see-sawing match as one of the best matches "of all time". Fiji lost their quarter final match against South Africa, however their above expectations performance in the tournament resulted in them moving up to 9th in the world rankings – their highest ever position.

Group stage

Pos	Team	Pld	W	D	L	PF	PA	PD	B	Pts	Qualification
1	Australia	4	4	0	0	215	41	+174	4	20	Qualified for the quarter-finals
2	Fiji	4	3	0	1	114	136	−22	3	15	Qualified for the quarter-finals
3	Wales	4	2	0	2	168	105	+63	4	12	Eliminated, automatic qualification for RWC 2011
4	Japan	4	0	1	3	64	210	−146	1	3	
5	Canada	4	0	1	3	51	120	−69	0	2	

12 September 2007
18:00

Japan	31–35	Fiji
Tries: Thompson (2) 51' c, 78' c Soma 62' m Con: Onishi (2/3); Pen: Onishi (4/4) 18', 30', 40+', 43'	Report	Tries: Qera (2) 36' c, 49' c Rabeni 56' m Leawere 71' c Con: Little (3/4); Pen: Little (3/3) 4', 55', 74'

Stadium de Toulouse, Toulouse
Attendance: 34,500
Referee: Marius Jonker (South Africa)

16 September 2007
14:00

Fiji	29–16	Canada
Tries: Leawere 22' c Ratuvou (2) 28' m, 80+' c Delasau 42' c Con: Little (3/4); Pen: Little (1/3) 8'	Report	Tries: Smith 60' c Con: Pritchard (1/1); Pen: Pritchard (3/4) 4', 27', 74'

Millennium Stadium, Cardiff
Attendance: 45,000
Referee: Tony Spreadbury (England)

23 September 2007
14:30

Australia	55–12	Fiji
Tries: Giteau (2) 17' c, 36' m Mitchell (3) 31' c, 70' c, 79' m Ashley-Cooper 57' c Hoiles 74' m Con: Giteau (4/6); Pen: Giteau (3/3) 28', 42', 50'; Drop: Barnes (1/1) 44'	Report	Tries: Neivua 40+' m Ratuva 47' c Con: Bai (1/1)

Stade de la Mosson, Montpellier
Attendance: 32,231
Referee: Nigel Owens (Wales)

29 September 2007
17:00

Wales	34–38	Fiji
Try: Popham 34' c S. Williams 45' c G. Thomas 48' m M. Jones 51' c M. Williams 73' m Con: Hook (1/1); S. Jones (2/4); Pen: S. Jones (1/2) 5'	Report	Tries: Qera 16' c Delasau 19' m Leawere 25' c Dewes 77' c Con: Little (3/4); Pen: Little (4/5) 21', 24', 54', 60'

Stade de la Beaujoire, Nantes
Attendance: 37,080
Referee: Stuart Dickinson (Australia)

Quarter finals

7 October 2007
15:00

South Africa	37–20	Fiji
Tries: Fourie 13' m Smit 35' m Pietersen 51' c Smith 70' c James 80' c Con: Montgomery (3/5); Pen: Steyn (1/1) 8'; Montgomery (1/2) 63'	Report	Tries: Delasau 57' c Bobo 59' c Con: Bai (2/2); Pen: Bai (2/2) 26', 44'

Stade Vélodrome, Marseille
Attendance: 55,943
Referee: Alan Lewis (Ireland)

=== 2011 Rugby World Cup ===
Pos	Team	Pld	W	D	L	PF	PA	PD	T	B	Pts	Qualification
1	South Africa	4	4	0	0	166	24	+142	21	2	18	Advanced to the quarter-finals and qualified for the 2015 Rugby World Cup
2	Wales	4	3	0	1	180	34	+146	23	3	15	Advanced to the quarter-finals and qualified for the 2015 Rugby World Cup
3	Samoa	4	2	0	2	91	49	+42	9	2	10	Eliminated but qualified for 2015 Rugby World Cup
4	Fiji	4	1	0	3	59	167	−108	7	1	5	
5	Namibia	4	0	0	4	44	266	−222	5	0	0	

10 September 2011	Fiji	49–25	Namibia	International Stadium, Rotorua
17 September 2011	South Africa	49–3	Fiji	Regional Stadium, Wellington
25 September 2011	Fiji	7–27	Samoa	Eden Park, Auckland
2 October 2011	Wales	66–0	Fiji	Waikato Stadium, Hamilton

=== 2015 Rugby World Cup ===
Pos	Team	Pld	W	D	L	PF	PA	PD	T	B	Pts	Qualification
1	Australia	4	4	0	0	141	35	+106	17	1	17	Advanced to the quarter-finals and qualified for the 2019 Rugby World Cup
2	Wales	4	3	0	1	111	62	+49	11	1	13	Advanced to the quarter-finals and qualified for the 2019 Rugby World Cup
3	England	4	2	0	2	133	75	+58	16	3	11	Eliminated but qualified for 2019 Rugby World Cup
4	Fiji	4	1	0	3	84	101	−17	10	1	5	
5	Uruguay	4	0	0	4	30	226	−196	2	0	0	

18 September 2015	England	35–11	Fiji	Twickenham Stadium, London
23 September 2015	Australia	28–13	Fiji	Millennium Stadium, Cardiff
1 October 2015	Wales	23–13	Fiji	Millennium Stadium, Cardiff
6 October 2015	Fiji	47–15	Uruguay	Stadium mk, Milton Keynes

=== 2019 Rugby World Cup ===
Pos	Team	Pld	W	D	L	PF	PA	PD	T	B	Pts	Qualification
1	Wales	4	4	0	0	136	69	+67	17	3	19	Advanced to the quarter-finals and qualified for the 2023 Rugby World Cup
2	Australia	4	3	0	1	136	68	+68	20	4	16	Advanced to the quarter-finals and qualified for the 2023 Rugby World Cup
3	Fiji	4	1	0	3	110	108	+2	17	3	7	Eliminated but qualified for 2023 Rugby World Cup
4	Georgia	4	1	0	3	65	122	−57	9	1	5	
5	Uruguay	4	1	0	3	60	140	−80	6	0	4	

21 September 2019
13:45 JST (UTC+09)

(1 BP) Australia	39–21	Fiji
Try: Hooper 18' c Hodge 36' m Latu (2) 57' m, 62' m Kerevi 69' c Koroibete 73' c Con: Lealiifano (1/2) 19'; To'omua (2/3) 70', 74'; Pen: Hodge (1/1) 51'	Report	Try: Yato 9' m Nayacalevu 44' c Con: Volavola (1/2) 46'; Pen: Volavola (3/3) 5', 23', 31'

Sapporo Dome, Sapporo
Attendance: 36,482
Referee: Ben O'Keeffe (New Zealand)

25 September 2019
14:15 JST (UTC+09)

(2 BP) Fiji	27–30	Uruguay
Try: Dolokoto 8' m Mawi 19' c Ratuniyarawa 48' m Matawalu (2) 67' m, 80+1' m Con: J. Matavesi (1/3) 20'	Report	Try: Arata 14' c Diana 22' c Cat 26' c Con: Berchesi (3/3) 15', 23', 28'; Pen: Berchesi (3/4) 38', 61', 76'

Kamaishi Recovery Memorial Stadium, Kamaishi
Attendance: 14,025
Referee: Pascal Gaüzère (France)

3 October 2019
14:15 JST (UTC+09)

Georgia	10–45	Fiji (1 BP)
Try: Gorgodze 53' c Con: Matiashvili (1/1) 55'; Pen: Matiashvili (1/2) 35'	Report	Try: Nayacalevu 20' c Lomani 45' m Tuisova 50' m Radradra (2) 61' c, 76' c Kunatani 68' c Ratuniyarawa 70' c Con: Volavola (5/7) 21', 63', 70', 72', 77'

Hanazono Rugby Stadium, Higashiōsaka
Attendance: 21,069
Referee: Paul Williams (New Zealand)

9 October 2019
18:45 JST (UTC+09)

(1 BP) Wales	29–17	Fiji
Try: Adams (3) 18' c, 31' c, 61' m L. Williams 69' c Con: Biggar (2/2) 20', 32'; Patchell (1/2) 70'; Pen: Patchell (1/1) 58'	Report	Try: Tuisova 4' m Murimurivalu 9' m Penalty try 54'

Oita Stadium, Ōita
Attendance: 33,379
Referee: Jérôme Garcès (France)

=== 2023 Rugby World Cup ===
Pos	Team	Pld	W	D	L	PF	PA	PD	TF	TA	B	Pts	Qualification
1	Wales	4	4	0	0	143	59	+84	17	8	3	19	Advance to knockout stage, and qualification to the 2027 Men's Rugby World Cup
2	Fiji	4	2	0	2	88	83	+5	9	9	3	11 (Note: Head-to-head: Australia 15–22 Fiji)	Advance to knockout stage, and qualification to the 2027 Men's Rugby World Cup
3	Australia	4	2	0	2	90	91	−1	11	8	3	11	Qualification to the 2027 Men's Rugby World Cup
4	Portugal	4	1	1	2	64	103	−39	8	13	0	6	
5	Georgia	4	0	1	3	64	113	−49	7	14	1	3	

Source: World Rugby
Rules for classification: Pool stage tiebreakers
Notes:

10 September 2023
21:00 CEST (UTC+2)

(1 BP) Wales	32–26	Fiji (2 BP)
Try: Adams 7' m North 29' c Rees-Zammit 48' c Dee 66' c Con: Biggar (3/4) 30', 49', 67'; Pen: Biggar (2/3) 3', 24'	Report	Try: Nayacalevu 14' c Tagitagivalu 17' c Tuisova 73' c Doge 78' m Con: Lomani (2/2) 15', 18'; Tela (1/2) 73'

Nouveau Stade de Bordeaux, Bordeaux
Attendance: 41,274
Referee: Matthew Carley (England)

17 September 2023
17:45 CEST (UTC+2)

(1 BP) Australia	15–22	Fiji
Try: Nawaqanitawase 23' m Vunivalu 68' c Con: Donaldson (1/2) 70'; Pen: Donaldson (1/1) 3'	Report	Try: Tuisova 43' c Con: Kuruvoli (1/1) 44'; Pen: Kuruvoli (4/4) 12', 21', 27', 33'; Lomani (1/3) 66'

Stade Geoffroy-Guichard, Saint-Étienne
Attendance: 41,294
Referee: Andrew Brace (Ireland)

30 September 2023
17:45 CEST (UTC+2)

Fiji	17–12	Georgia (1 BP)
Try: Nayacalevu 51' c Habosi 68' c Con: Lomani (2/2) 52', 69'; Pen: Lomani (1/2) 65'	Report	Pen: Matkava (2/2) 5', 80'; Niniashvili (2/2) 19', 31'

Nouveau Stade de Bordeaux, Bordeaux
Attendance: 39,862
Referee: Karl Dickson (England)

8 October 2023
21:00 CEST (UTC+2)

(1 BP) Fiji	23–24	Portugal
Try: Botia 48' c Doge 68' c Con: Lomani (2/2) 49', 69'; Pen: Lomani (3/3) 10', 74', 76'	Report	Try: Storti 45' c Fernandes 51' c Marta 78' c Con: Marques (3/3) 47', 53', 79'; Pen: Marques (1/1) 38'

Stadium de Toulouse, Toulouse
Attendance: 32,223
Referee: Luke Pearce (England)

Quarter-finals

15 October 2023
17:00 CEST (UTC+2)

England	30–24	Fiji
Try: Tuilagi 14' m Marchant 23' c Con: Farrell (1/2) 23'; Pen: Farrell (5/6) 11', 34', 38', 54', 78'; Drop: Farrell (1/1) 72'	Report	Try: Mata 28' c Ravai 64' c Botitu 68' c Con: Lomani (1/1) 29'; Kuruvoli (2/2) 65', 70'; Pen: Lomani (1/3) 20'

Stade Vélodrome, Marseille
Attendance: 61,863
Referee: Mathieu Raynal (France)

== Overall record ==
Against	Played	Win	Draw	Lost	Win %
Argentina	1	1	0	0	100
Australia	4	1	0	3	25
Canada	3	2	0	1	66.67
England	3	0	0	3	0
France	4	0	0	4	0
Georgia	2	2	0	0	100
Italy	1	0	0	1	0
Japan	2	2	0	0	100
New Zealand	1	0	0	1	0
Romania	1	0	0	1	0
Samoa	1	0	0	1	0
Scotland	1	0	0	1	0
South Africa	2	0	0	2	0
Uruguay	2	1	0	1	50
United States	1	1	0	0	100
Wales	5	1	0	4	20
Namibia	2	2	0	0	100
Portugal	1	0	0	1	0
Overall	37	13	0	24	34.21

== Hosting ==
Fiji has not hosted any World Cup games, and has not put in bids for future tournaments, due to the lack of facilities and the small size of the island nation.
