= John Buchholz =

John Buchholz may refer to:

- John Theodore Buchholz (1888–1951), American botanist
- John Buchholz (rugby union) (born 1979), American rugby union player
