= Kitione Salawa =

Kitione Salawa may refer to:

- Kitione Salawa (rugby union, born 1976), Fijian international rugby union player (sometimes referred to as Kitione Salawa Snr.)
- Kitione Salawa (rugby union, born 2001), Fijian international rugby union player (sometimes referred to as Kitione Salawa Jnr.)
