= Alifereti Doviverata =

Fijian rugby union footballer (born 1976)

- Born: 14 June 1976 (age 50)
- Height: 6 ft 1 in (185 cm)
- Weight: 238 lb (108 kg; 17 st 0 lb)

Rugby union career
- Position: No. 8
International career
| Years | Team | Apps | (Points) |
| 1999-2007 | Fiji | 42 | (25) |
National sevens team
| Years | Team | | Comps |
- Fiji
Medal record
Men's rugby sevens
Representing Fiji
Commonwealth Games
| Silver medal – second place | 1998 Kuala Lumpur | Team competition |

Ro Alifereti Raivalita Doviverata (born 14 June 1976 in Suva) is a Fijian rugby union footballer. He plays as a Flanker or a No. 8. His nickname is Dovi.

He is from a chiefly background and his father is one of the chiefs of Rewa. He first played for Fiji in Sevens. A Fiji schoolboy rep in 1993 and 1995, he first played for the Fiji sevens team in 1996 before spending one season with Redruth in England. He played in the opening two IRB sevens tournaments of the 2000–01 season. He made his debut for Fiji against Spain in 1999. He missed out on the 2001 Rugby World Cup Sevens in Argentina but was picked by the former Italy and at that time coach of Fiji Brad Johnstone to be part of the 1999 Rugby World Cup Fiji team that year. He then earned a regular starting place in the loose forwards under late coach Greg Smith in 2000–01. He took over as national 15s skipper for the November 2001 tour of Europe. Under Mac McCallion, Dovi cemented his place as No. 8, and was named the captain against Tonga in July 2003 and shortly after that he was made captain of the Fiji team to the 2003 Rugby World Cup. He played for and co-captained the Pacific Islanders in their inaugural tour to New Zealand and Australia.

In May 2007, he was chosen to skipper the Fiji team for the 2007 Pacific Nations Cup.

== Fiji team ==
- 35 caps 5 tries 25 points (43 games 5 tries)
  - Pacific Islanders
- 2 caps (4 games)
