= Epeli Ruivadra (rugby union, born 1977) =

Fijian rugby union footballer (born 1977)

- Born: Epeli Ruivadra; 1 June 1977 (age 49) Nausori, Fiji
- Height: 185 cm (6 ft 1 in)
- Weight: 90 kg (14 st 2 lb; 198 lb)

Rugby union career
- Position(s): Wing, Centre
International career
Years	Team	Apps	(Points)
2002–2006	Fiji	17	(5)
Medal record
Men's rugby sevens
Representing Fiji
Commonwealth Games
Silver medal – second place	2002 Manchester	Team competition

Epeli Ruivadra (born 1 June 1977 in Nausori) is a Fijian rugby union footballer. He plays as a centre.

He is 1.85m tall and weighs 90 kg. He started playing rugby at Lelean Memorial School and represented the school's Under 19s team in the Deans Trophy in 1997. He even tried to play at prop for his club Dravo before moving to the backs.

He trialled in 2001 for the Pacific Tri-Nations and he managed to break into the squad for the tour to Europe later that year, then made the Fiji sevens squad for Beijing and Hong Kong in 2002 where he was Fiji's top try-scorer at both tournaments.

Ruivadra made his Test debut under Mac McCallion in the first game against Tonga in June 2002, and scored a try.

He earned a spot in the Rugby World Cup 2003 and played an instrumental role in Fiji's final pool game against Scotland but they were unlucky to lose.
