= Matua Parkinson =

New Zealand former rugby union player (born 1975)

- Full name: Matua Te Atatu Abraham Parkinson
- Born: 4 January 1975 (age 51) Wanganui, New Zealand
- Height: 187 cm (6 ft 2 in)
- Weight: 97 kg (15 st 4 lb)
- Notable relative(s): Reuben Parkinson (brother); Pari Pari Parkinson (nephew)

Rugby union career
- Position: Flanker
Senior career
Years	Team	Apps	(Points)
2004–05	Sanix		
Provincial / State sides
Years	Team	Apps	(Points)
1999–03	North Harbour	49	(60)
2005	Bay of Plenty	4	(0)
Super Rugby
Years	Team	Apps	(Points)
2000	Hurricanes	5	(0)
2001–02	Blues	16	(5)
International career
Years	Team	Apps	(Points)
- Māori All Blacks
National sevens team
Years	Team		Comps
- New Zealand 7s
- Rugby league career

Playing information
Club
Years	Team	Pld	T	G	FG	P
1998	Canterbury-Bankstown	1				0

Matua Te Atatu Abraham Parkinson (born 4 January 1975) is a New Zealand television presenter and former professional rugby player. He captained New Zealand in the World Sevens Series.

== Biography ==
=== Early life ===
Parkinson was born and raised in the small Bay of Plenty coastal community of Te Kaha, where his father was a crayfisherman. He is of Te Whānau-ā-Apanui and Atihaunui-a-Pāpārangi descent. The youngest of five siblings, Parkinson is the brother of Japan international Reuben.

=== Rugby career ===
A dreadlocked openside flanker, Parkinson started his career in the North Harbour sevens team, from where he was recruited by Canterbury-Bankstown to play rugby league, a sport he had never previously played. He spent most of his time at Canterbury-Bankstown in 1998 playing reserves and was granted an early release from his contract to return to New Zealand. Debuting for the North Harbour XV in 1999, Parkinson broke into the Hurricanes lineup the following season, playing five Super 12 games. He was the best player for NZ Maori in their win over Scotland at New Plymouth in 2000. After two seasons with the Blues, Parkinson had a stint in Japan in 2004/05, then on his return to New Zealand played briefly for the Bay of Plenty.

=== Television ===
Parkinson is a former presenter of Māori Television show Hunting Aotearoa and in 2023 filmed a Sky Open travel series with ex-All Black Carlos Spencer called Lost in France.
