= Graeme Burns =

Scotland international rugby union player

- Born: Graeme George Burns; 29 October 1971 (age 55) Edinburgh, Scotland
- School: Daniel Stewart's and Melville College

Rugby union career
Amateur team(s)
Years	Team	Apps	(Points)
1990−	Stewart's Melville RFC		
1996	Watsonians RFC		
Senior career
Years	Team	Apps	(Points)
−2004	Edinburgh Rugby		
International career
Years	Team	Apps	(Points)
1997	Scotland 7s		
2001	Scotland A		
1999−2002	Scotland	4	(0)
Coaching career
- Years: Team
- −2009: Haddington RFC

Graeme George Burns (born 29 October 1971) is a Scottish rugby union coach and former player. He gained four international caps for the Scotland national rugby union team and captained the Scotland A team and Scotland 7s team. He began playing rugby in the amateur era, then went on to captain Edinburgh Rugby as a professional.

== Early life ==
Burns was born on 29 October 1971 in Edinburgh, Scotland. He was educated at Daniel Stewart's and Melville College. In 1990 he played for under-18 side while at Stewart's Melville RFC.

Burns captain Scotland at the 1997 Rugby World Cup Sevens.

His first cap for the Scotland XV came against Italy in a Five Nations at Murrayfield on 6 March 1999. His final appearance for Scotland was on tour against the United States of America at San Francisco on 22 June 2002. He was a replacement in all four of his international caps.

In 2001 he captained the Scotland A side.

He played his last match for Edinburgh in May 2004 before he was released by the side.

He was a coach at Haddington RFC, leaving the post in 2009.
