= Lawrence Little =

Fijian rugby union player

- Born: 24 October 1967 (age 59) Tokoroa, New Zealand
- Height: 6 ft 1 in (1.85 m)
- Weight: 187 lb (85 kg; 13 st 5 lb)

Rugby union career
- Position: Centre
International career
Years	Team	Apps	(Points)
1995-1999	Fiji	16	(5)

Lawrence Little (born 24 October 1967) is a New Zealand born former rugby union player. He played for Fiji alongside his nephew and teammate Nicky Little at the 1999 Rugby World Cup.

Little made his debut for Fiji against Canada at Nadi on 8 April 1995. His last match was against Spain on 24 August 1999.
