= Mattie Stewart =

Scotland international rugby union player

- Born: Matthew James Stewart; 18 May 1973 (age 53) Dartford, England
- Height: 1.80 m (5 ft 11 in)
- Weight: 115 kg (18 st 2 lb)
- Occupation: physical training instructor

Rugby union career
- Position: prop
Amateur team(s)
Years	Team	Apps	(Points)
1997–2003	Northampton Saints		
International career
Years	Team	Apps	(Points)
1996–2002	Scotland	34	(0)

Matthew James Stewart (born 18 May 1973) is a former rugby union player, who gained 34 caps as a prop for Scotland (1996–2002).

== Early life ==
Stewart was born on 18 May 1973 in Dartford, England.

== Rugby career ==
Stewart's first international appearance was against Italy at Murrayfield on 14 December 1996. He was a Lance Corporal physical training instructor in the British Army at the time.

He returned to start for Scotland in February 2000 against Italy. He went on the 2002 Scotland rugby union tour of North America where Ian McGeechan tried playing him at loose head against Canada.

His last cap was against Romania at Murrayfield on 9 November 2002, coming on as a late replacement.

He played 169 matches for the Northampton Saints between 1997 and 2003 during which time he scored five points for the club. Whilst at Northampton he started in the victorious 2000 Heineken Cup Final as they defeated Munster.

He played two matches for Barbarian F.C. in 1994.
