= Adam Parker (rugby union) =

Japan international rugby union player

- Born: Adam Grant Parker; 21 April 1973 (age 53) Christchurch, New Zealand
- Height: 6 ft 4 in (1.93 m)
- Weight: 240 lb (110 kg; 17 st)

Rugby union career
- Position: Lock
Amateur team(s)
Years	Team	Apps	(Points)
1995–1996	Sydenham		
Senior career
Years	Team	Apps	(Points)
1999–2005	Toshiba		
Provincial / State sides
Years	Team	Apps	(Points)
1995	South Canterbury	2	(0)
1996	Nelson Bays	5	(0)
International career
Years	Team	Apps	(Points)
1998	New Zealand Maori	2	(0)
2000–2004	Japan	18	(0)

Adam Grant Parker (born Christchurch, 21 April 1973) was a New Zealand rugby union player who played as lock or as flanker. He played internationally for Japan.

== Career ==
Parker started his career playing in 1995, playing for South Canterbury in the NPC, the following year he moved to Nelson Bays, earning 5 caps in the club. In 1999, Parker moved to Japan, where he joined Toshiba Fuchu, with which he won the All-Japan Rugby Football Championship in 2004, the same year he left the club. He was also a New Zealand Maori team member in 1998, where he was also a trialist. He was first capped for Japan on 19 May 2000, against Russia, at Chichibunomiya Rugby Stadium. Parker was also part of the 2003 Rugby World Cup squad, playing 4 matches at the tournament. His final cap for Japan was against Italy, on 4 July 2004.
