= Shin Hasegawa =

Japanese rugby union player

- Born: 31 March 1972 (age 54) Kyoto, Japan
- Height: 179 cm (5 ft 10 in)
- Weight: 102 kg (225 lb)
- School: Higashiyama High School
- University: Chuo University

Rugby union career
- Position(s): Prop, Hooker
Amateur team(s)
Years	Team	Apps	(Points)
1991-1994	Chuo University Rugby Football Club		
Senior career
Years	Team	Apps	(Points)
1994-2007	Suntory		
International career
Years	Team	Apps	(Points)
1997-2003	Japan	40	(5)
Coaching career
- Years: Team
- 2007-2014: Suntory Sungoliath
- 2015-current: Yamaha Júbilo (forwards coach)

Shin Hasegawa (長谷川慎, Hasegawa Shin) (born 31 March 1972 in Kyoto) is a Japanese former rugby union player who played as prop and hooker. Currently forwards coach of Yamaha Júbilo.

== Career ==
Hasegawa started to play rugby at the age of 4. Until then, he played as hooker, but when he played for Higashiyama High School rugby team he played prop in Hanazono. At Chuo University RFC, he returned to play as hooker. After graduating from university, Hasegawa was part of a Kantō region representative team which toured New Zealand in 1995. His first cap for Japan was on 29 June 1997, against Hong Kong in Tokyo, where he played as a replacement flanker. Hasegawa was also called up by the then-national coach Seiji Hirao to play for Japan in the 1999 Rugby World Cup, where he played all the three pool stage matches in the tournament. He also played for Japan in the 2003 Rugby World Cup, playing all the four matches in the tournament. His last cap for Japan was against United States, in Gosford, on 27 October 2003. From 1995, after his graduation from Chuo University, he joined Suntory club, with which he won the Japan Company Rugby Football Championship in 1997 and 1998, as well the All-Japan Rugby Football Championship in 2000 and 2002. He retired in 2007 and became a forwards coach initially for Suntory and later for Yamaha Jubilo.
