= Naoya Okubo =

Japan international rugby union player

- Born: September 27, 1975 (age 51) Osaka, Japan
- Height: 6 ft 2 in (1.88 m)
- Weight: 220 lb (100 kg; 15 st 10 lb)
- University: Hosei University

Rugby union career
- Position(s): Flanker, Lock
Amateur team(s)
| Years | Team | Apps | (Points) |
- Hosei University High School RFC
| – | Hosei University RFC | | |
Senior career
| Years | Team | Apps | (Points) |
| 1998-2008 | Suntory | | |
International career
| Years | Team | Apps | (Points) |
| 1999-2004 | Japan | 23 | (0) |

Naoya Okubo (大久保直弥, Ōkubo Naoya) (born 27 September 1975) is a former Japanese rugby union player. Okubo played 23 matches for the Japan national rugby union team from 1999 to 2004. His regular playing positions were Flanker and Lock.

As of December 2013 Okubo is the coach of Top League team Suntory Sungoliath. In 2015, Okubo became the coach of NTT Communications Shining Arcs.

He was named the first Non-Kiwi coach of the Sunwolves in their last year of Super Rugby in 2020.
