= Yuji Sonoda =

Japanese rugby union player

- Born: Yuji Sonoda; 5 July 1973 (age 53) Kanagawa Prefecture, Japan
- Height: 1.78 m (5 ft 10 in)
- Weight: 84 kg (185 lb; 13.2 st)
- School: Hirakata Daisan Junior High School; Josho Keiko Gakuen High School
- University: Hosei University

Rugby union career
- Position: Scrum-half
Youth career
- 19??-19??: Hosei University RFC
Senior career
Years	Team	Apps	(Points)
1999-2011	Kobe Steel Kobelco Steelers		
International career
Years	Team	Apps	(Points)
2000-2003	Japan	18	(10)
Coaching career
- Years: Team
- 2009-2014: Kobe Steel Kobelco Steelers

Yuji Sonoda (苑田 右二, Sonoda Yūji; born 5 July 1973 in Osaka) is a Japanese former rugby union player and currently coach. He played as scrum-half. He is the current coach of Hosei University RFC. He is nicknamed "Son".

== Career ==
Before becoming a rugby union player, Sonoda played baseball, but he started rugby union while attending Hirakata Daisan Junior High School, playing initially as centre. He later became a scrum-half playing for Josho Keiko Gakuen High School. Three years later, he won the National High School Rugby Tournament in Hanazono. Sonoda also was selected as high school representative for Japan.

Since his first year at Hosei University, he was a regular player in the All-Japan University Rugby Championships. Two years later, Hosei was runner-up in the tournament. Sonoda was named as captain four years later and would be selected as a university representative for Japan.

After his graduation from university, Sonoda joined Kobe Steel. Since joining the team, Sonoda suffered injuries such as left wrist fractures and left knee ligament injuries, and Masami Horikoshi was already the starting scrum-half, so Sonoda could not have the opportunity to participate in the match.

In the 1999 season, he played an active role in filling the place of Horikoshi after the latter left the team, and played as a regular. From the 2002 season, Sonoda served as the captain for Kobe Steel.

In the 2009 season, Sonoda served the team as player-coach and retired as a player after the season.

From the 2010 season, Sonoda was appointed as head coach for Kobelco Steelers. He left the team after the 2013 season. From 2016, Sonoda became the head coach of Hosei University RFC.

=== International career ===
Sonoda received his first cap for Japan during the test match against Fiji in Tokyo, on 20 May 2000. He was also part of the Japanese squad coached by Shogo Mukai for the 2003 Rugby World Cup, playing four matches at the tournament, with the pool stage match against United States, in Gosford, on 27 October 2003 being his last international test cap.
