= Dan Lyle =

US international rugby union player (born 1970)

- Born: Daniel Joseph Lyle; September 28, 1970 (age 56) Louisville, Kentucky, U.S.
- Height: 6 ft 5 in (1.96 m)
- Weight: 252 lb (114 kg)
- University: Virginia Military Institute

Rugby union career
- Position: No. 8
Amateur team(s)
Years	Team	Apps	(Points)
- OMBAC
Senior career
Years	Team	Apps	(Points)
1996–2003	Bath	125	(15)
2003–2004	Leicester	2	(5)
- Correct as of January 1, 2021
International career
Years	Team	Apps	(Points)
1994–2003	United States	45	(30)
1997–2000	Barbarians F.C.	2	(10)
- Correct as of January 1, 2021

Daniel Joseph Lyle (born September 28, 1970) is an American former rugby union player who played for the United States national rugby union team 45 times from 1994 to 2003, serving as U.S. captain in 24 of those matches. Lyle played number eight.

== Early life ==
Lyle was born in Louisville, Kentucky. A 1992 graduate of Virginia Military Institute where he played college football, he took up rugby union at age 23 in an attempt to keep fit.

== National team ==
Lyle debuted for the U.S. national team against Ireland in November 1994 at Lansdowne Road. He first captained the U.S. squad in a match against Japan in June 1996, in the Pacific Rim tournament. He also led the U.S. sevens team to victory in the bowl competition at the Hong Kong Sevens in 1997. Lyle captained the team at the 1999 Rugby World Cup. Lyle appeared for the United States in the 2003 Rugby World Cup, and retired from international play in 2003. Through his national team career, Lyle earned 45 caps for his country, and captained his side in 24 matches, including 11 wins in those matches (at the time a record for the most wins all-time by any U.S. captain; that record has since been broken by Todd Clever).

== Professional rugby ==
He joined English club Bath from the Old Mission Beach Athletic Club (OMBAC) for the 1996/7 season. He spent seven seasons at Bath and played in 125 matches for the club. He helped them to lift the Heineken Cup title in 1998 with victory over Brive, and captained the side for the 2001/2 season. Lyle moved to the Leicester Tigers in 2003.

He had been invited to train with the NFL's American football team Minnesota Vikings and had a trial with the Washington Redskins.

Lyle was inducted into the US Rugby Hall of Fame on June 4, 2016, in Philadelphia, PA.

== Management ==
Dan Lyle worked for United World Sports as an Executive Vice President and Tournament Director with USA Sevens LLC from 2006 to 2016, the owner and operator of the USA Sevens rugby tournament. That tournament is played every year at Sam Boyd Stadium in Las Vegas, and is the largest commercial rugby tournament in the United States. Dan Lyle left UWS for to become the Director of Rugby for Anschutz Entertainment Group launching AEG Rugby in October 2016.

== Personal ==
Lyle married Rebecca Hansford on December 30, 2004, at St John's Church in Bath, England. They have three boys and reside just outside Boulder, Colorado.
