= Reuben Parkinson =

Japan international rugby union player (born 1973)

- Born: Reuben Arthur Hira Parkinson; 19 July 1973 (age 53) Ōpōtiki, New Zealand
- Height: 6 ft 1 in (1.85 m)
- Weight: 209 lb (95 kg; 14.9 st)
- Notable relative: Matua Parkinson (brother)

Rugby union career
- Position: Centre
Amateur team(s)
Years	Team	Apps	(Points)
1997-1998	Southern		
2005	Mt Maunganui		
Senior career
Years	Team	Apps	(Points)
2001-2005	Sanix		
Provincial / State sides
Years	Team	Apps	(Points)
1997-1999	Otago		
2005	Bay of Plenty		
Super Rugby
Years	Team	Apps	(Points)
1998, 2000	Highlanders	4	(0)
1999	Hurricanes	6	(0)
International career
Years	Team	Apps	(Points)
2001-2005	Japan	10	(0)

Reuben Arthur Hira Parkinson (born 19 July 1973) is a New Zealand rugby union player who played for Japan, with 10 caps and 0 points in aggregate. He played as centre.

== Career ==
Parkinson first played as a flanker, then became a midfielder when he moved to Dunedin. He then joined Otago playing 49 games in 1998, including a NPC title. In that year, he was also a New Zealand Maori trialist and also played for the Highlanders in the Super 14. In 1999, he joined the Hurricanes for six matches.

He continued his rugby union career after moving to Japan, playing for Munakata Sanix Blues for five years.

Parkinson was also part of Japan's national team, first playing in Tokyo against Russia on 25 May 2003. He also played at the 2003 World Cup with Hurricanes midfielder George Konia. Parkinson left Japan in 2005, following a final cap on 19 June against Ireland. He moved back to New Zealand in that year to play for the Bay of Plenty Steamers. Like his brother, Matua also played for Sanix.

His younger brother Matua Parkinson was also a Hurricanes team member since 2000, as well as a former All Blacks Sevens team member.
