= Jurie Gouws =

US international rugby union player

- Born: April 4, 1973 (age 53) Durban, South Africa
- Height: 6 ft 3 in (191 cm)
- Weight: 240 lb (109 kg)

Rugby union career
- Position: Flanker
International career
Years	Team	Apps	(Points)
2003–04	United States	8	(0)

Jurie Gouws (born April 4, 1973) is a South-African-born American former rugby union international.

Gouws, born in Durban, South Africa, played his rugby for the Santa Monica club.

A flanker, Gouws represented the United States at the 2003 Rugby World Cup, where he came on as a substitute in the matches against Scotland and France. He was capped eight times for the United States during his career.

== See also ==
- List of United States national rugby union players
