= Masahiko Toyoyama =

Japan international rugby union player

- Born: August 16, 1976 (age 50) Osaka, Japan
- Height: 1.78 m (5 ft 10 in)
- Weight: 107 kg (236 lb)
- School: Gonokawa High School, Shimane
- University: Osaka University of Health and Sport Sciences

Rugby union career
- Position: Prop
Amateur team(s)
Years	Team	Apps	(Points)
1995-1999	Osaka University of Health and Sport Sciences RFC		
Senior career
Years	Team	Apps	(Points)
1999-2008	Toyota		
International career
Years	Team	Apps	(Points)
2000-2003	Japan	24	(15)
Coaching career
- Years: Team
- 2013-2015: Toyota

Masahiko Toyoyama (豊山昌彦, Toyoyama Masahiko) (born Osaka, 16 July 1976) is a Japanese former rugby union player who played as prop.

== Career ==
After graduating from high school in 1995, Toyoyama joined Osaka University of Health and Sport Sciences' rugby club, with which he played in the All-Japan University Rugby Championship. In 1999, he graduated from university and joined Toyota Motors club. He first played for Japan against Fiji, in Tokyo, on 20 May 2000. He was also present in the 2003 Rugby World Cup squad coached by Shogo Mukai, playing three pool stage matches in the tournament. His final cap for Japan was against United States, in Gosford, on 27 October 2003, earning 24 caps, 15 points and 3 tries scored in aggregate. In 2008, Toyoyama left Toyota Verblitz, retiring as player. In 2013, he was appointed as coach by his former club, Toyota Verblitz and served for two seasons. Toyoyama also played for Japan A in 2001, against a New Zealand Universities XV.
