= Tsutomu Matsuda =

Japan international rugby union player

- Born: April 30, 1970 (age 56) Saitama Prefecture, Japan
- Height: 5 ft 11 in (1.80 m)
- Weight: 198 lb (90 kg)
- School: Soga High School
- University: Kanto Gakuin University

Rugby union career
- Position(s): Fullback, Wing
Amateur team(s)
Years	Team	Apps	(Points)
-1993	Kanto Gakuin University RFC		
Senior career
Years	Team	Apps	(Points)
1993-2013	Toshiba		
International career
Years	Team	Apps	(Points)
1992-2003	Japan	43	(70)
National sevens team
Years	Team		Comps
1991-1993	Japan 7s		81993

Tsutomu Matsuda (松田努, Matsuda Tsutomu) (born 30 April 1970) is a former Japanese rugby union player. He played as fullback and wing.

== Career ==
Matsuda started playing rugby at Soga High School and after entering Kanto Gakuin University, he switched from number 8 to fullback. After graduating from university, he joined Toshiba Fuchu. From 1996, he became a central player in the team, including during the achievement of the three consecutive Japanese championship titles under the "P to GO" tactics of the then-coach Shogo Mukai. Even though he was called up in the 1991 Rugby World Cup roster, he had no opportunity to participate as he was at the time enrolled in university. He earned his first cap in 1992 against Hong Kong. Later, he became a member of Japanese national team as fullback, participating at the 1995, 1999 and 2003 World Cups, for three consecutive competitions.

Matsuda had also experiences with the Japan sevens team, with which he played the 1993 Rugby World Cup Sevens.

In 2007, he was elected in the Asia Squad to play against the Barbarians in the Lipovitan D Challenge.

Even after the age of 40, Matsuda started in a Top League official match. He has the Top League's longest player record and he is the try record holder.

As of 18 March 2013, Matsuda announced his retirement. "I loved rugby and i was able to enjoy the tight, so i continued it for a long time".
