= David Couzinet =

French international rugby union player

- Born: 7 June 1975 (age 51) Toulouse, France
- Height: 2.02 m (6 ft 7 1/2 in)
- Weight: 115 kg (18 st 2 lb)

Rugby union career
- Position: Lock
Senior career
Years	Team	Apps	(Points)
1985-1997	Saint-Sulpice-sur-Lèze		
- Toulouse
1997-1998	Agen		
1998-2002	Biarritz		
- Correct as of 7 August 2006
International career
Years	Team	Apps	(Points)
2004-2008	France	3	(00)

David Couzinet (born 7 June 1975 in Toulouse, France) is a French international rugby union player. He played as a Lock for Agen and USA Perpignan. He started his professional career at Stade Toulousain. He moved to SU Agen where he lost the final of the Top 14 against Biarritz Olympique. After the summer he joined it. With Biarritz Olympique he was finalist of the Heineken Cup in 2005 and he won twice Top 14.
