= George Konia =

Japan international rugby union player

- Born: George Newing Konia; 9 August 1969 (age 57) Putāruru, New Zealand
- Height: 6 ft 0 in (1.83 m)
- Weight: 212 lb (96 kg; 15.1 st)
- School: Te Aute College

Rugby union career
- Position(s): Centre, Wing
Amateur team(s)
Years	Team	Apps	(Points)
1989–1990	Palmerston North High School Old Boys		
1991–1992	Kia Toa RFC		
1993–1996	Taradale		
1997	Star		
Senior career
Years	Team	Apps	(Points)
1997–2000	Isetan		
2001–2005	NEC		
Provincial / State sides
Years	Team	Apps	(Points)
1989–1992	Manawatu	58	(98)
1993–1996	Hawke's Bay	53	(115)
1997	Southland	5	(0)
Super Rugby
Years	Team	Apps	(Points)
1996	Hurricanes	7	(5)
International career
Years	Team	Apps	(Points)
1989–1990	New Zealand Colts	5	(52)
1990–1996	New Zealand Divisional XV	18	(41)
1991–1995	New Zealand Maori	10	(19)
2003	Japan	6	(1)
Coaching career
- Years: Team
- 2005–2006: Hawke's Bay (assistant coach)
- 2007-2010: Kintetsu Liners
- 2011-2012: Mitsubishi Dynaboars (assistant coach)
- 2013-2014: Northland (assistant coach)
- 2015-2017: Mitsubishi Dynaboars (Head Coach)
- 2018-2019: Northland (assistant coach)
- 2020-2022: Northland (Head Coach)
- 2023-: Hawke's Bay (Coach Development Manager)

George Konia (born 9 August 1969 in Putāruru) is a New Zealand former rugby union player who played for New Zealand Maori and for Japan. He played mainly as centre, but also as wing.

== Career ==
Konia started his rugby career representing Manawatu in 57 matches between 1989 and 1992 and Hawke’s Bay 39 times between 1993 and 1995 prior to his only Super 14 season for the Hurricanes in 1996. In all, he played 96 first-class matches across seven seasons of representative rugby. During that time he also played for the New Zealand Colts, New Zealand Divisional XV, New Zealand Development XV, New Zealand XV, New Zealand Maori, New Zealand Barbarians, and was an All Black trialist.

Konia was on the fringe of All Blacks selection and was on standby for the 1995 Rugby World Cup squad. But it was another country, Japan, that Konia made his mark in international rugby. After playing club rugby there, Konia debuted for the Japan national team in San Francisco against United States on 17 May 2003, and, in the same year, he was called up by then-national coach Shogo Mukai to play for Japan in the 2003 Rugby World Cup in Australia alongside another former Hurricane Reuben Parkinson, scoring a memorable try against France in the tournament pool stage. He spent eight years playing professional rugby in Japan, first with the Isetan club and then at the NEC Green Rockets winning the All-Japan Rugby Football Championship twice: in 2003 against Suntory Sungoliath and in 2005 against Toyota Verblitz. Konia's last cap for Japan was also against United States, in Gosford, on 27 October 2003.

He returned to New Zealand to be assistant coach of Hawke’s Bay in the 2005 and 2006 seasons, helping the Magpies win the last Division Two final over Nelson Bays in 2005 and helping run the backs in the inaugural Air New Zealand Cup in 2006.

In 2007, he returned to Japan to coach Kintetsu Liners.
