= Andy Miller (rugby union) =

Scottish rugby union player

- Born: Andrew Miller; 1 April 1982 (age 44) Galashiels, Scotland
- Height: 1.83 m (6 ft 0 in)
- Weight: 95 kg (14 st 13 lb; 209 lb)

Rugby union career
- Position: Flanker
- Current team: Exeter Chiefs
Senior career
Years	Team	Apps	(Points)
2007-	Exeter Chiefs		
International career
Years	Team	Apps	(Points)
- Scotland A

Andy Miller (born 1 April 1982 in Galashiels) is a professional rugby player for Exeter Chiefs in the Aviva Premiership. His position of choice is Flanker.
