= Ludovic Loustau =

French rugby union player (born 1973)

- Born: 15 August 1973 (age 53) Talence, France
- Height: 1.83 m (6 ft 0 in)
- Weight: 83 kg (13 st 1 lb)

Rugby union career
- Position: Scrum-half
Senior career
Years	Team	Apps	(Points)
1992-1997	US Dax		
1997-1999	Stade Français		
1999-2001	Bègles		
2001-2005	USA Perpignan		
2005-2006	RC Toulonnais		
2006-2007	Lyon OU		
International career
Years	Team	Apps	(Points)
2002	France A	1	(0)
2004	France	1	(0)

Ludovic Loustau (born 15 August 1973) is a former French international rugby union footballer who played scrum-half in France's Top 14 competition.

Loustau was born in Talence, France. His first professional club was US Dax. From 1997 until 1999 he played for Stade Français which he won French championship in 1998. After the 1998–99 season, he moved to Bègles he helps it to get in Top 16 in 2001. After the promotion he moved for USA Perpignan where he played during four seasons. Loustau has played for France. In July 2004 he was selected for France's Test squad to play the American national teams and made his Test début against the Canucks on 10 July 2004.

== Honours ==
(France) Stade Français

- French Rugby Union Championship/Top 14: 1997–98
