= Masaaki Sakata =

Japan international rugby union player

- Born: November 25, 1972 (age 53) Nagaokakyō, Kyoto Prefecture, Japan
- Height: 5 ft 11 in (1.80 m)
- Weight: 216 lb (98 kg)
- School: Nitta High School, Matsuyama
- University: Hosei University

Rugby union career
- Position: Hooker
Amateur team(s)
Years	Team	Apps	(Points)
1988-1991	Nitta High School RFC		
1991-1995	Hosei University Rugby Football Club		
Senior career
Years	Team	Apps	(Points)
1995-2008	Suntory		
International career
Years	Team	Apps	(Points)
1996-2003	Japan	33	(25)

Masaaki Sakata (坂田正彰, Sakata Masaaki) (born 25 November 1972 in Nagaokakyō), is a Japanese former rugby union player who played as hooker.

== Career ==
Sakata started playing rugby in a boys' sports group in Otsu in 1982. He later attended Nitta High School, in Matsuyama, playing for its club until his graduation in 1991, when he would play for Hosei University's rugby union club, being part of the Hosei squad which won the 1993 All-Japan University Rugby Championship final against Waseda University for 30-27. In 1995, Sakata joined Suntory club. A year later, during the All-Japan Rugby Football Championship final against Sanyo Electric, in the loss time, he caught the ball at the last minute near the end of the touch line, which was the starting point. In 1998, Suntory finished runner-up in the 50th Japan Company Rugby Football Championship final after the 28-27 defeat against Toyota Motors. In 2001, Suntory won against Kobe Steel in the 54th Japan Company Rugby Football Championship, as well the 2001 All-Japan Rugby Football Championship final of that year, drawing against the same team. Two years later, Sakata was also part of the Suntory Sungoliath squads which won the 2002 Japan Company Rugby Football Championship and the 2003 squad which ended runner-up in that year's All-Japan Rugby Football Championship. He retired as player from Suntory in 2008.

== International career ==
Between 10 and 30 March 1991, Sakata was part of a Japan schoolboys XV which was in a tour in Wales, participating in five matches. However, he was first capped for the Japan national team in 1996, against Canada, at the Chichibunomiya Rugby Stadium, on 9 June. Sakata also took part in the 1999 Rugby World Cup, playing all three pool stage matches against the Argentina, Samoa and Wales, as well in the 2003 Rugby World Cup, playing three matches in tournament, with the match against Fiji at Townsville on 23 October being his last cap for Japan.

== After career ==
In 2009, a year after his retirement, Sakata served as a commentator on NHK university rugby relay, where his calm and unbiased commentary style was popular. In 2013, he was appointed as Suntory Sungoliath's general manager. In 2014 he resigned from his role.
