= Gerhard Klerck =

US international rugby union player

- Full name: Gerhard Stefan Klerck
- Born: December 6, 1975 (age 50) Pretoria, South Africa
- Height: 6 ft 6 in (198 cm)
- Weight: 240 lb (109 kg)

Rugby union career
- Position: Lock
International career
Years	Team	Apps	(Points)
2003–04	United States	8	(0)

Gerhard Stefan Klerck (born December 6, 1975) is a South African-born American former rugby union international.

Klerck was born in Pretoria and educated at Hoërskool Verwoerdburg, before moving to Aspen, Colorado in the late 1990s to play rugby union for Super League club Gentlemen of Aspen. He first started playing the sport the age of six.

A lock, Klerck played professional rugby in Italy for Benetton Treviso and was a United States representative from 2003 to 2004. He appeared once at the 2003 Rugby World Cup, against Japan in Gosford, as starting lock in a 39–26 win.

== See also ==
- List of United States national rugby union players
