= Masao Amino =

Japanese rugby union footballer and coach

- Born: October 7, 1974 (age 52) Yamanashi Prefecture, Japan
- Height: 1.78 m (5 ft 10 in)
- Weight: 95 kg (209 lb; 15.0 st)
- School: Hikawa High School, Yamanashi
- University: Kanto Gakuin University

Rugby union career
- Position: Hooker
Youth career
- 1993-1997: Kanto Gakuin University RFC
Senior career
Years	Team	Apps	(Points)
1997-2010	NEC Green Rockets		
International career
Years	Team	Apps	(Points)
2000-2003	Japan	10	(0)
Coaching career
- Years: Team
- 2010-2016: NEC Green Rockets

Masao Amino (網野 正大,, Amino Masao) (born in Yamanashi Prefecture, on 14 October 1974) is a Japanese former rugby union player and currently coach.

== Career ==
Amino first played rugby in 1993, for Kanto Gakuin University's rugby union team. In 1997 after his graduation, he would join NEC Green Rockets, playing for the club until the end of his career in 2010.

== International career ==
Amino debuted for Japan during the test match against South Korea, on 2 July 2000, in Aomori. He was also part of the 2003 Rugby World Cup Japan squad, playing three matches in the tournament, with his last test cap being the pool stage match against United States in Gosford, on 27 October 2003.

== Coaching career ==
After his retirement from played rugby in 2010, Amino would coach his former club NEC Green Rockets between 2010 and 2016.
