= Koli Sewabu =

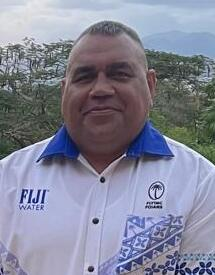
- Sewabu in 2025
- Born: Kolinio Sewabu; January 15, 1975 (age 51)
- Height: 6 ft 4 in (1.93 m)
- Weight: 106 kg (16 st 10 lb)

Rugby union career
- Position(s): Number 8, flanker, centre
Amateur team(s)
Years	Team	Apps	(Points)
1998-2000	North Shore		
Senior career
Years	Team	Apps	(Points)
2000-01	Bordeaux Bègles		
2001-03	Gloucester		
2003-06	Yamaha Jubilo		
2006-08	Manawatu		
International career
Years	Team	Apps	(Points)
1999-2003	Fiji	27	(15)

Koli Sewabu (born 15 January 1975 in Nausori) is a Fijian rugby union footballer. He plays as a Flanker or a No. 8.

== Career ==
Sewabu started in his early playing days of secondary school rugby at first-five, wing and fullback. He later switched to flanker/number 8 when he left school, a move welcomed by his former mentor Buck Shelford due to his tackling ferocity and clinical play. He played for Rewa Colts, Tailevu Development XV, Malolo in the Fiji B Division Comp before he pursued a Diploma in Tourism Studies in Auckland, NZ in 1997. In between his visits to Fiji, he played for Naitasiri in the Digicel Cup. In 1998, he was selected into the Fiji team tour of UK under coach Brad Johnsstone where he played matches for the Fiji team against European clubs like Leeds Tykes and Leicester Tigers. He earned his first cap in May 1999 against Canada in the Epson Cup. He made the Fiji team to the 1999 Rugby World Cup. He played in all four of Fiji's RWC99 games. He set up the match-winning try to Marika Vunibaka against Canada. He played for North Shore under then coach, Buck Shelford. He attained a business degree while staying at Massey University. He left for France in 2000 and joined French Top 14 side, Bordeaux Bègles. He even played at centre for the club. He was also part of the 2003 Fiji rugby union tours.

Sewabu signed for European giants Gloucester in 2001. In 2003, he joined Japanese side, Yamaha Jubilo. He returned to NZ and joined NPC side, Manawatu. He ended his rugby career in 2008. While at Gloucester he was a replacement in the 2002 Zurich Championship Final (the year before winning the play-offs constituted winning the English title) in which Gloucester defeated Bristol Rugby.

== After Retirement ==
Sewabu coached Feilding Rugby Club for 2 seasons and Freyberg Rugby for a season. He assisted Kia Toa RFC after Freyberg and helped them win the Hankins Shield. He pursued his degree at Massey, majoring in Sport and Exercise Science. He also helped coach Manawatu U18s and U20s. He started his sports management and coaching consultancy business called Vunilagi Pasifika Ltd. and has been involved as a technical adviser to a number of teams around the globe. Currently, he assists the Massey University Rugby CLub as a technical advisor. His personal goal is to go back to Fiji and coach the national team at and 2019 Rugby World Cup. He has transitioned well from professional rugby, with investment properties and business initiatives. Sewabu has an interest in using sports, rugby in particular as a tool for socio-economic development, and has been involved in a number of projects and research in the area of financial literacy and socio-economic development.

Sewabu graduated with an Executive Masters in Business Administration at Massey University in 2013 and he is also trying to help Fijian and Pacific rugby players manage their finances.

In May 2025, he was made acting CEO of Fiji Rugby Union.

== Fiji team ==
- 27 caps 3 tries [25 points] (36 games 5 tries) and a racked up a total of approximately 320 first class games, including test matches, Fiji Provincial championships, European Cup & Shield, Japan Top League and NZ Provincial Championship.
