= Masahito Yamamoto =

Japan international rugby union player

- Born: May 29, 1978 (age 48) Aichi, Japan
- Height: 6 ft 1 in (1.85 m)
- Weight: 253 lb (115 kg; 18 st 1 lb)

Rugby union career
- Position: Prop
International career
Years	Team	Apps	(Points)
2001-2007	Japan	26	(5)

Masahito Yamamoto (山本正人, Yamamoto Masahito) (born 29 May 1978 in Aichi, Japan) is a Japanese rugby union player. Yamamoto has played 26 matches for the Japan national rugby union team. Yamamoto was a member of the Japan squad at the 2003 and 2007 Rugby World Cups.
