= Takashi Tsuji =

Japanese rugby union player

- Born: Takashi Tsuji; 24 April 1977 (age 49) Ibaraki Prefecture, Japan
- Height: 1.67 m (5 ft 5 1/2 in)
- Weight: 75 kg (165 lb; 11.8 st)
- School: Meikei Gakuen Junior High School, Ibaraki
- University: Waseda University

Rugby union career
- Position: Scrum-half
Amateur team(s)
Years	Team	Apps	(Points)
- Waseda University RFC
Senior career
Years	Team	Apps	(Points)
2000-2008	NEC Green Rockets		
International career
Years	Team	Apps	(Points)
2003-2006	Japan	7	(0)

Tsuji Takashi (辻高志, Takashi Tsuji) (born 24 April 1977 in the Ibaraki Prefecture) is a Japanese former rugby union player who played as scrum-half, he later became a coach, currently coaching NEC Green Rockets.

== Career ==
He started to take up rugby in 1990, when he played for his high school's team, which he led to the victories at the Kanto Junior High School Tournament and the East Japan Junior High School Tournament two years later. In 1995, he ended runner-up at the East Japan High School Selection Tournament, the Kanto Tournament A block, the 7th National Athletic Meeting, and the national tournament where he took part. Tsuji graduated from the same high school in 1996. In high school, he not only was a rugby player in the club, but also a talented musician, and was selected as a conductor of grade chorus. In 1996, he entered Waseda University's School of Human Sciences and joined its rugby club. He was the first choice scrum-half since 3 years. In 2000, he joined NEC and thus, to NEC Green Rockets, the company's rugby team. A year later, he played in All East Japan Senior League games. He also won the 2002 All-Japan Rugby Football Championship for NEC. In 2003, he represented Japan at the 2003 Rugby World Cup, debuting against Scotland in Townsville. In 2008, he finished the season and retired. A year later, he was appointed as a Waseda University coach while still in duty for NEC. In 2010, he became the director of Waseda University RFC. In 2012, Tsuji retired from Waseda University RFC director, succeeded by Yoshikazu Goto.
