= Greg Smith (rugby union, born 1974) =

Fiji international rugby union player

- Born: Gregory James Smith; 14 July 1974 (age 52) Hamilton, New Zealand
- Height: 1.82 m (6 ft 0 in)
- Weight: 106 kg (234 lb)

Rugby union career
Senior career
Years	Team	Apps	(Points)
2000-2001	Swansea	9 (0)	
Provincial / State sides
Years	Team	Apps	(Points)
1995-2004	Waikato	70	
Super Rugby
Years	Team	Apps	(Points)
1997–03	Chiefs	48	(0)
International career
Years	Team	Apps	(Points)
1995-2003	Fiji	46	(5)
Coaching career
- Years: Team
- 2014–2015: New Zealand women

Gregory James Smith (born 14 July 1974) is a former professional rugby union footballer, who played as a hooker.

== Career ==
Smith was born and raised in New Zealand but he qualified to play for Fiji because his father was born there. He was first selected for Fiji by former coach Brad Johnstone on the recommendation of Waikato's John Boe.

He toured the UK with the Fiji team in 1995 and he made his debut against Wales which Fiji lost by 21–22. He joined the Waikato Rugby Union after that and he made it into the Chiefs squad for the Super 12 competition. He played for the Chiefs for six years before leaving New Zealand and going to Europe to play for the Swansea club in Wales. He returned a year later to play in the NPC match against Auckland but lost in the final. A neck injury kept him out of the 2001 tour to Italy and France and then a foot injury saw him miss the 2003 Rugby World Cup qualifiers in June and July 2002 and he also missed the test against Australia and Argentina but he recovered in time for the 2003 Rugby World Cup and he was made captain of the Fiji team.

After retiring in 2005, he was made a resource coach for the Black Ferns, and was recently appointed as an assistant coach to Samoa. He has coached for nine years in Japan and held a number of provincial coaching roles including a specialist resource coach role for the Chiefs.

In December 2014, he was made the head coach for the Black ferns team through to the next Women's Rugby World Cup in 2017. Smith voluntarily stepped down as New Zealand women's head coach on 16 June 2015.

== Fiji Team ==
Smith also attended Waikato University from 1993–1996 and was friends with Robert Diver.

- Test debut: 1995 vs Wales in Cardiff
- 46 caps 1 try 5 pts (70 games 1 try)

== Notes ==
Sporting positions
Preceded by Brian Evans	Black Ferns coach 2014–2015	Succeeded by Glenn Moore
