= Vula Maimuri =

- Born: Vula Ratuva Maimuri; 3 November 1975 (age 51) Nadroga-Navosa Province, Fiji
- Height: 6 ft 6 in (198 cm)
- Weight: 260 lb (118 kg)

Rugby union career
- Position: Lock
- Current team: --
Amateur team(s)
Years	Team	Apps	(Points)
1999-2002	Awanui		
Senior career
Years	Team	Apps	(Points)
2002-2003	SU Agen		
Provincial / State sides
Years	Team	Apps	(Points)
1999-2002	Northland	39	(25)
2006	Northland	5	(0)
Super Rugby
Years	Team	Apps	(Points)
2001	Highlanders	10	(5)
2002-2003	Blues	9	(5)
International career
Years	Team	Apps	(Points)
2003	Fiji	5	(0)

Vula Ratuva Maimuri (born Nadroga, 3 November 1975), is a Fijian former rugby union player who played as lock. He is currently on trial along with his son for the assault and murder of Vimal Nand.

== Career ==
=== Club career ===
Maimuri first played for Northland in the National Provincial Championship between 1999 and 2002. In 2003, he moved in France to play for SU Agen until 2005. In 2006, Maimuri returned to New Zealand to play again for Northland. He also played for New Zealand Barbarians in 2002, as well for the Highlanders in 2001 and the Blues between 2002 and 2003.

=== International career ===
Maimuri first played for Fiji on 18 August, against Argentina, in Cordoba. He was also in the Fiji squad for the 2003 Rugby World Cup, playing four matches in the tournament, with the match against Scotland, on 1 November 2003, in Sydney being his last international cap.
