= Sisa Koyamaibole =

Fiji international rugby union player

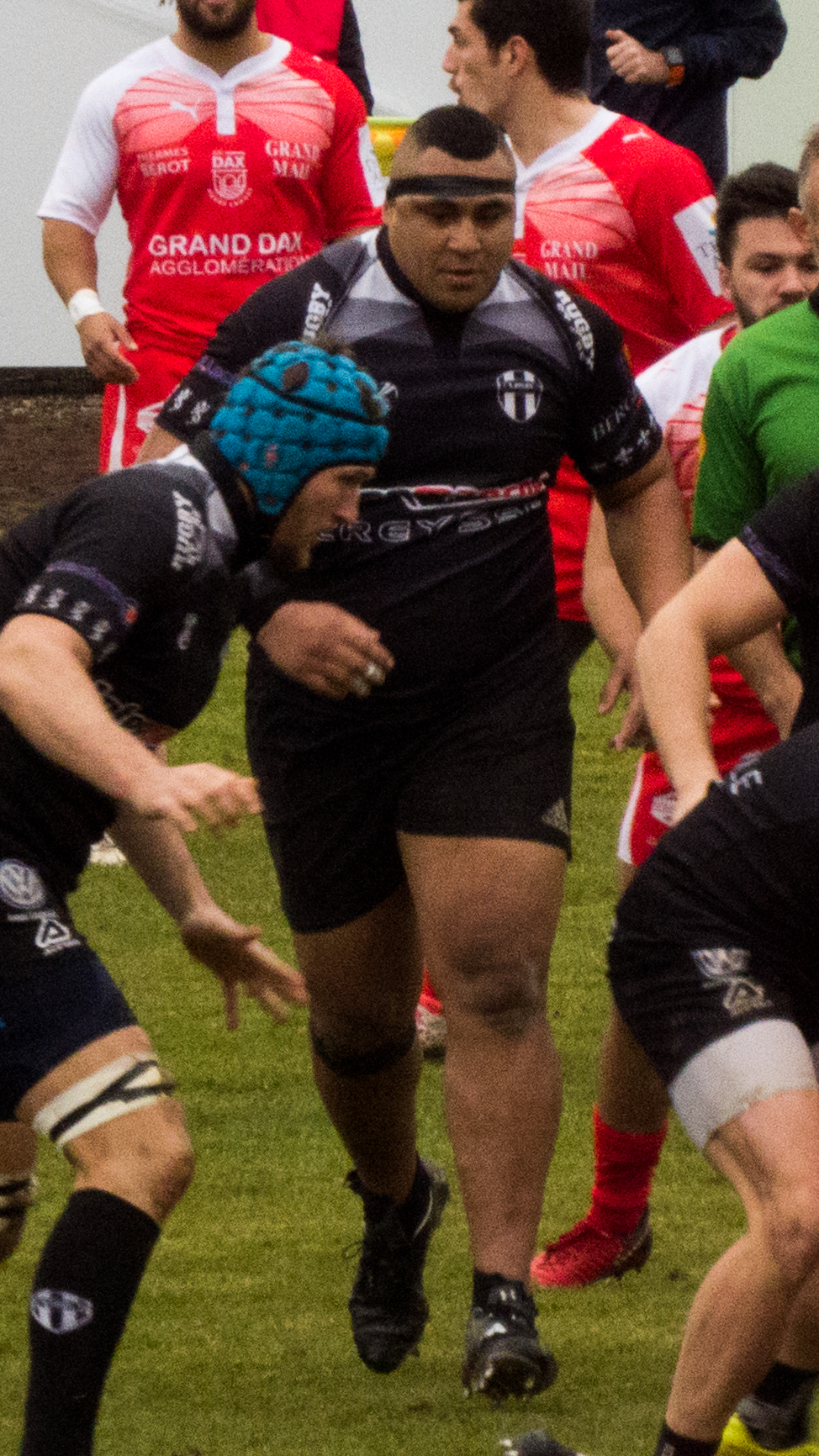
- Born: Sisaro Dautu Koyamaibole; 6 March 1980 (age 46) Suva, Fiji
- Height: 192 cm (6 ft 4 in)
- Weight: 120 kg (18 st 13 lb; 265 lb)
- School: Dudley High School

Rugby union career
- Position(s): Number eight, Flanker
Senior career
Years	Team	Apps	(Points)
2002–2003	Toyota Shokki Shuttles		
2004	Counties Manukau		
2005	Taranaki	16	(30)
2006–2008	Petrarca Padova	37	(80)
2008–2009	Toulon	11	(5)
2009–2011	Sale	49	(50)
2011–2012	Lyon	14	(10)
2012	Bordeaux-Bègles	4	(0)
2012–2013	Libourne		
2013–2018	Brive	106	(55)
- Correct as of 17 September 2016
International career
Years	Team	Apps	(Points)
2001–	Fiji	48	(15)
2004–2008	Pacific Islanders	5	(0)
National sevens team
Years	Team		Comps
2001	Fiji		

Sisaro Dautu Koyamaibole (born 6 March 1980) is a Fijian rugby union player. His usual position is at number eight. Koyamaibole also plays for Fiji, including playing in the 2003 Rugby World Cup, the 2007 Rugby World Cup and the 2011 Rugby World Cup, and has played for the Fiji Sevens in rugby sevens tournaments. At club level, he has represented Taranaki, Petrarca Padova, Toulon, Sale Sharks, Lyon OU, Bordeaux Bègles and currently plays for Brive.

== Career ==
Born 6 March 1980 in Suva, Koyamaibole began his international career in 2001 making his debut against Tonga. Koyamaibole was one of the few local Fijian club players to be selected for the 2003 Rugby World Cup. In 2004 Koyamaibole moved to the Number 8 position where he also played for the Pacific Islanders. After showing impressive form for the Pacific Islanders that year, Koyamaibole was given a contract with New Zealand club Counties Manukau. A year later he moved to Taranaki, but missed most of the season due to injury and then a long suspension. He played every test for Fiji between 2001 and 2004, however between 2005 and 2007, Koyamaibole did not play any Tests for Fiji. This was reportedly due to a falling out with Wayne Pivac, then coach of Fiji.

=== 2007 World Cup ===
When Fiji announced their 30-man squad for the 2007 Rugby World Cup, Koyamaibole was one of the most experienced members, one of only four players to have more than 30 caps at the time. Koyamaibole was part of the Fiji team that knocked Wales out of the tournament by winning 38–34, and played in Fiji's first quarter-final at a Rugby World Cup since the 1987 Rugby World Cup. Although they lost 37–20 to eventual winners, South Africa, Fiji received a standing ovation from the crowd despite South African player Jaque Fourie commenting before the match that Fiji did not deserve the respect of the Springboks. Koyamaibole played five matches in the tournament, playing at number eight on four occasions.

=== Toulon ===
It was announced in June 2008 that Koyamaibole would join French club RC Toulonnais. He was one of several players signed by the club as the club prepared for the 2008-09 Top 14 season – the top level of the national league system of France – having secured promotion the previous season. The club struggled to avoid relegation for most of the season, although managed to stay in the top flight. Koyamaibole left the club at the end of the season and was offered a contract with English club Sale Sharks

=== Sale Sharks ===
In May 2009 it was announced that Koyamaibole had signed a two-year contract for Guinness Premiership side Sale Sharks. Kingsley Jones, Sale's director of rugby, described Koyamaibole as "a gifted athlete who is very mobile around the field" with "excellent discipline". He was one of several players signed by Sale in the off-season after the departure of Philippe Saint-André as director of rugby and several players. Jones requested that Koyamaibole try to lose nearly 3 stone to slim down to the weight of 18.5 stone, as he was at the 2007 Rugby World Cup. Koyamaibole commented that Sale was different to the clubs he had previously been a part of, with a focus on professionalism and fitness. It was possible that commitments to Sale would conflict with international duties, but he has stated that "if I can be released by the club then I'll be more than happy to play for Fiji".

Koyamaibole made his debut for Sale on 4 September 2009, dominating the scrum with fellow Sale-debutant Jack Forster. The match, which was the opening game of the 2009–10 Guinness Premiership, was won by Sale who defeated the Leicester Tigers, the defending champions, 15–12.

Koyamaibole had a good start to his Sale career, his strong carrying a joy to behold.

Koyamaibole was given a two-week ban starting on 26 January 2011, for kicking Saracens' Richard Wigglesworth during Sale's 28–22 victory over the club.
