= Kain Cross =

United States international rugby union & league player

- Born: February 4, 1974 (age 52) Dubbo, NSW, Australia
- Height: 5 ft 9 in (1.75 m)
- Weight: 185 lb (84 kg)
- School: St Gregory's College, Campbelltown

Rugby union career
- Position: Centre
International career
Years	Team	Apps	(Points)
2003–04	United States	12	(25)

Kain Cross (born February 4, 1974) is an Australian-born American rugby union international.

Cross, born in Dubbo, was educated at St Gregory's College, Campbelltown and played rugby league growing up. He competed in the lower grades for NSWRL club Western Suburbs during the early 1990s and then moved to Perth to play with the Western Reds. Marrying an American, Cross subsequently relocated to Los Angeles.

A Santa Monica player, Cross was a United States representative in 2003 and 2004, gaining 12 caps. He featured at international level as a centre, with a hat-trick of tries in a win over Japan amongst the highlights of his career, as well as two appearances at the 2003 Rugby World Cup in Australia.

== See also ==
- List of United States national rugby union players
