= Phil Murphy (rugby union, born 1976) =

Canada international rugby union player

- Born: Phil Troy Murphy; 4 December 1976 (age 49) St. John's, Newfoundland and Labrador
- Height: 195 cm (6 ft 5 in)
- Weight: 113 kg (249 lb)
- School: Methodist College Belfast

Rugby union career
- Position: Number 8 / Flanker
Senior career
Years	Team	Apps	(Points)
2000–2003	USA Perpignan		
2003–2008	London Irish	135	(55)
2008–	Viadana Rugby		
International career
Years	Team	Apps	(Points)
2000–2004	Canada	18	(25)

Phil Troy Murphy (born 4 December 1976 in St. John's, Newfoundland) is an Irish Canadian rugby union footballer who plays at No 8.

He previously played for London Irish and French side Perpignan.

He has 18 caps for his native Canada, although he has four caps at schoolboy level for Ireland. He has also played for the French Barbarians. In Canada he played for Oakville Crusaders. He made 126 appearances for the Exiles, scoring 10 tries. Murphy attended the University of Victoria in British Columbia.

In February 2008 it was announced that Murphy was to leave London Irish to join Italian side Viadana.
