= Kirk Khasigian =

- Born: April 27, 1977 (age 49) Sacramento, California, U.S.
- Height: 5 ft 11 in (1.80 m)
- Weight: 210 lb (95 kg; 15 st 0 lb)

Rugby union career
- Position: Hooker
International career
Years	Team	Apps	(Points)
1998–2003	United States	37	(15)

Kirk Khasigian (born April 27, 1977 in Sacramento, California) is an American former rugby union player. He attended Jesuit High School, which has featured a number of rugby players who went on to play for the USA. He was a collegiate all-American in 1996, 1997, and 1998 when he played college rugby with UC Berkeley. He played hooker for the United States national team from 1998 to 2003, earning 37 caps with 28 starts. He played in seven matches for the US in the 1999 and 2003 Rugby World Cups, scoring one try. After retiring, he worked as a real estate manager.
