= Matt Wyatt =

American rugby union player (born 1978)

- Full name: Matthew Wyatt
- Born: March 4, 1978 (age 48) Southampton, Pennsylvania, United States
- Height: 5 ft 8 in (173 cm)
- Weight: 210 lb (95 kg)
- School: William Tennent High School
- University: Pennsylvania State University

Rugby union career
- Position: Hooker
International career
Years	Team	Apps	(Points)
2003–06	United States	15	(15)

Matthew Wyatt (born March 4, 1978) is an American former rugby union international.

== Biography ==
Wyatt, raised outside Philadelphia, was born in Southampton, Pennsylvania and attended William Tennent High School, playing high school football as a defensive end and fullback. Receiving offers to play Division II college football, Wyatt instead went to Pennsylvania State University, where he played varsity rugby, a sport he had taken up aged 16 with the Doylestown club. He was a prop in varsity rugby and earned All-American honours three-times.

After graduating, Wyatt went to Wales to train with professional club Llanelli, as well as Aberavon and British Steel. He represented the United States as a hooker between 2003 and 2006, featuring in two matches at the Rugby World Cup in Australia during his first year. After relocating to San Diego, Wyatt played club rugby for Old Mission Beach.

== See also ==
- List of United States national rugby union players
