= Jacob Waasdorp =

American rugby union international (born 1978)

- Born: October 18, 1978 (age 48) Pasadena, CA, United States
- Height: 6 ft 1 in (185 cm)
- Weight: 270 lb (122 kg)

Rugby union career
- Position: Prop
International career
Years	Team	Apps	(Points)
2003–05	United States	15	(5)

Jacob Waasdorp (born October 18, 1978) is an American former rugby union international.

Born in Pasadena, California, Waasdorp attended Quartz Hill High School and was originally an American football player.

Waasdorp, an All-Conference defensive lineman at UC Berkeley, had a free-agent trial with the Green Bay Packers, before he made the decision to switch to rugby union, joining the varsity team in 2002.

A prop, Waasdorp represented the United States at the 2003 Rugby World Cup in Australia, where he played in matches against Japan and France. He continued in the national team until 2005, amassing 15 total caps.

== See also ==
- List of United States national rugby union players
