= Kimball Kjar =

US international rugby union player

- Full name: Kimball Marcum Kjar
- Born: March 23, 1978 (age 48) Salt Lake City, Utah, United States
- Height: 5 ft 9 in (175 cm)
- Weight: 205 lb (93 kg)

Rugby union career
- Position: Scrum-half
International career
Years	Team	Apps	(Points)
2001–07	United States	19	(10)

Kimball Marcum Kjar (born March 23, 1978) is an American former rugby union international.

Kjar, born and raised in Salt Lake City, attended Bountiful High School. He competed in wrestling during his school years and played high school football, as a receiver and defensive back.

It wasn't until Kjall began his studies at Brigham Young University that he picked up rugby union, having been invited to play by friends. He was a three-time collegiate All-American.

A scrum-half, Kjar was a United States representative player between 2001 and 2007. He played twice as a substitute at the 2003 Rugby World Cup in Australia, including the win over Japan.

Kjar co-founded Major League Rugby team the Utah Warriors and is the CEO.

== See also ==
- List of United States national rugby union players
