= Jason Keyter =

US international rugby union player

- Full name: Jason Christopher Keyter
- Born: December 20, 1973 (age 52) Port Elizabeth, South Africa
- Height: 5 ft 11 in (180 cm)
- Weight: 212 lb (96 kg)

Rugby union career
- Position: Centre / Wing
Senior career
Years	Team	Apps	(Points)
1992–95	Harlequin		
1995–96	Bristol		
1996–00	Harlequin		
2000–01	Roma		
2003–04	Rotherham		
International career
Years	Team	Apps	(Points)
2000–03	United States	17	(13)

Jason Christopher Keyter (born December 20, 1973) is a South African-born English former professional rugby union player who represented the United States in international rugby.

== Early life ==
Born in Port Elizabeth, Keyter moved to England with his mother at the age of 12.

Keyter's step-brother Mark Venner was a rugby union player who captained Henley Hawks.

== Rugby union career ==
A three-quarter, Keyter came through the Harlequins youth system and captained the club's colts side, before progressing into the firsts at age 19. He left in 1995 to play for Bristol, but ended up back at Harlequins and played there until 2000, when he was amongst those released in a large culling of the list by new coach Zinzan Brooke, despite having received player of the season honours at the end of year awards.

Keyter had a stint with Italian club Roma, then played for Rotherham in the 2003–04 season.

In 2005, Keyter was playing for amateur club Esher when he tested positive for cocaine. He claimed to be a victim of drink spiking during a night out in the West End. Initially given a 12-month ban by the RFU, Keyter's ban was extended by another 12-months in an appeal hearing at the Court of Arbitration for Sport.

Keyter returned to rugby briefly once his ban ended, turning out for Newquay Hornets.

=== International rugby ===
Keyter, an England underage representative player, had a grandfather hailing from Milwaukee, making him eligible to play for the United States.

Debuting against Wales at Millennium Stadium in 2000, Keyter played with the national team up to the 2003 Rugby World Cup, where he bowed up with two tournament appearances, against Scotland and France. He had 17 total caps for the United States.

== See also ==
- List of United States national rugby union players
