= Richard Nyholt =

- Born: 25 October 1975 (age 51) Lautoka, Fiji
- Height: 6 ft 1 in (1.85 m)
- Weight: 247 lb (112 kg)
- School: Southport School
- University: University of Queensland

Rugby union career
- Position: Prop
- Current team: Retired
Senior career
Years	Team	Apps	(Points)
1989-1993	Southport School		
1998-2003	University of Queensland		
International career
Years	Team	Apps	(Points)
1996	Fiji U-21		
1999-2001	Australian Barbarians		
2001–2003	Fiji	13	(0)

Richard Nyholt (born in Lautoka, 25 October 1975) is a Fijian-Australian former rugby union player who played as prop. He was nicknamed "Qio Vula" (White Shark).

== Career ==
Nyholt first played rugby union during his college days for the Southport School rugby union team, before joining the University of Queensland first grade team, with which he played until his retirement in 2003. Nyholt also played for Australian Universities between 1999 and 2001.

== International career ==
Nyholt was eligible to play for Fiji through birth, debuting internationally in 1996 with the U-21 team, which he captained. His first cap for Fiji was during a test against France, on 25 November 2001. Nyholt was called up in the 2003 Rugby World Cup Fiji squad, playing two matches in the tournament, against France on 11 October 2003 and against United States on 15 October 2003, both played at Lang Park in Brisbane, the former being his last international cap.

== Personal life ==
Nyholt lived in Fiji where he lived until the age of 10, before moving with his family to Australia. His father was the owner of a resort in Nadi.
