= Kevin Dalzell =

American former rugby union player

- Born: January 25, 1974 (age 52)
- Height: 5 ft 8 in (1.73 m)
- Weight: 170 lb (77 kg)

Rugby union career
- Position: Scrumhalf
Senior career
Years	Team	Apps	(Points)
- Brive
–	Clermont-Ferrand		
–	Bath Rugby		
International career
Years	Team	Apps	(Points)
1996–2003	United States	42	(109)

Kevin Dalzell (born January 25, 1974) is an American former rugby union player who played scrum-half.

Dalzell earned 42 caps for the U.S. national team from 1996 to 2003. He scored 109 points, and is tied for 8th on the all-time try-scoring list for the U.S. with 8 tries.

Dalzell made his debut September 21, 1996 against Uruguay in the Pacific Rim Championship. He scored his first points with a try against Hong Kong on June 20, 1998. Dalzell's most prolific year was 1999, where he played in 9 games, scoring 4 tries and 89 points. Dalzell represented the U.S. at the Rugby World Cup in 1999 and again in 2003. Dalzell was the captain and leading scorer for the U.S. at the 1999 Rugby World Cup, scoring 32 points. Dalzell led the U.S. in scoring in each of their three matches, amassing 1 try, 3 conversions, and 7 penalties.

Dalzell played club rugby for Old Mission Beach Athletic Club (OMBAC). Dalzell also played for Brive and Clermont-Ferrand in France, while also with Bath Rugby in England.

Dalzell played his college rugby for Cal from 1992 to 1997. Dalzell won the Woodley Award in 1996, an award presented to the top college rugby player in the country.

== Personal life ==
Dalzell works as a realtor in California: a job he held while also playing rugby for the US in the 2003 Rugby World Cup.
