= Alfred Uluinayau =

Fiji international rugby union player

- Born: Alfred Beranaliva Uluinayau; 20 February 1970 (age 56)
- Height: 5 ft 11 in (1.80 m)
- Weight: 90 kg (198 lb; 14 st 2 lb)

Rugby union career
- Position: Fullback
International career
Years	Team	Apps	(Points)
1996-2003	Fiji	35	(37)

Alfred Beranaliva Uluinayau nicknamed Alfie (born 20 February 1970) is a New Zealand rugby union player currently coaching professionally in Japan. He has represented Fiji as a fullback and is also a former Auckland player and All Black trialist.

He made his Fiji team debut against the Springboks in 1996 and took over the No.15 jersey in early 1999 when Jonetani Waqa ruptured his Achilles tendon. He then became Brad Johnstone’s first choice fullback at the 1999 Rugby World Cup and scored a memorable try against France in Toulouse.

He also scored the decisive try in the 2001 Pacific Tri-nations final against Samoa, cutting inside Samoan veteran center To’o Vaega to touch down under the posts.

He is now the Backs Coach for Fiji

== Personal Statistics ==
Full name: Alfred Beranaliva Uluinayau
Position: Utility Back
Born: 20 February 1970
Height: 1.8 m (5 ft 11 in)
Weight: 90 kg (200 lb)
Test debut: 1996 vs South Africa in Pretoria
35 caps 7 tries 1 con 37 pts (47 games)

== International Appearances (Fiji) ==
- 2 Jul 1996 v South Africa L 18–43
- 20 Jul 1996 v Samoa W 60–0
- 27 Jul 1996 v Tonga L 18–32
- 29 Sep 1996 v Hong Kong W 64-11 (-63)
- 5 Oct 1996 v Hong Kong W 37–16
- 1 Nov 1996 v NZ Maoris L 10–25
- 14 Jun 1997 v New Zealand L 5–71
- 21 Jun 1997 v Tonga W 20–10
- 27 Jun 1997 v Cook Islands W 53-7 (-40)
- 5 Jul 1997 v Samoa L 17-26 1T
- 27 Jun 1998 v France L 9-34 (+49)
- 22 Sep 1998 v Samoa W 26–18
- 26 Sep 1998 v Tonga W 32–15
- 15 May 1999 v Canada W 40-29 1T
- 5 Jun 1999 v Japan W 16–9
- 26 Jun 1999 v Tonga W 39-37 (-60)
- 3 Jul 1999 v Samoa L 15–27
- 1 Oct 1999 v Namibia W 67–18
- 9 Oct 1999 v Canada W 38-22 (-40)
- 16 Oct 1999 v France L 19-28 1T
- 20 Oct 1999 v England L 24–45
- 25 May 2001 v Tonga L 26-31 (+40)
- 4 Jul 2001 v Canada W 52-23 (+50) 1T 1C
- 8 Jul 2001 v Samoa W 28-17 1T
- 1 Jun 2002 v Samoa W 17-16 (-68)
- 7 Jun 2002 v Tonga W 47-22 (-50)
- 22 Jun 2002 v Samoa L 12-22 (-60)
- 29 Jun 2002 v New Zealand L 18-68 (-52)
- 11 Jul 2003 v Tonga L 22-23 (-55)
- 15 Oct 2003 v USA W 19–18

Key: T= Try, C= Conversion, (+)= Substituted in, (-)= Substituted out,

== Club affiliations ==
- Auckland (New Zealand)
- Mystic River Rugby Club (USA)
- Suntory R.F.C (Japan)
