= David Fee =

US international rugby union player (born 1976)

- Born: David Walter Fee; December 15, 1976 (age 49) Chicago, Illinois, U.S.
- Height: 5 ft 9 in (1.75 m)
- Weight: 170 lb (77 kg)
- University: Lake Forest College

Rugby union career
- Position: Wing
Amateur team(s)
Years	Team	Apps	(Points)
1997–1999	Lake Forest College		
1999	Lake County Rugby Club		
'00-'02,'04-'05	Back Bay Rugby Club		
2002–2003	Chicago Lions		
2006–2009	South Side Irish		
International career
Years	Team	Apps	(Points)
2002–2005	United States	28	(40)
- Correct as of 1 January 2021
National sevens team
Years	Team		Comps
2002–2005	United States		12

David Walter Fee (born December 15, 1976) is an American former rugby union player who played for the United States national teams (7's and 15's), where he primarily played wing. Fee earned 28 caps for the 15's US national team from 2002 to 2005 and started all four games in the 2003 Rugby World Cup. Fee also played on the 7's team, competing in the 2005 Rugby World Cup Sevens in Hong Kong.

== Youth and college sports ==
Fee was born in Chicago, Illinois. He began his rugby career at Lake Forest College, in Lake Forest, Illinois. He was the place kicker and punter for the football team and was recruited by the rugby team to play fullback. As an All-State soccer player in high school, Fee was able combine his athleticism, speed and kicking skills to make an immediate impact on the rugby pitch.

Fee played for the C.A.R.F.U (Chicago Area Rugby Football Union) Collegiate All-Stars 1997–1999.

During his senior year at Lake Forest College, he was the starting running back on the football team and was selected First Team All Midwest conference.

Fee was elected to the Lake Forest College Athletic Hall of Fame for rugby and football in 2013.

== International rugby ==
Fee made his international debut in January 2002, at the World Sevens Series tournament in Santiago, Chile. In pool play against Brasil, he set an American record scoring five tries in a single game. He was also the tournament leader in tries, scoring a total of 13. The US beat Canada in the Bowl finals 32–5. Fee's early success on the 7's circuit got him attention from the 15's program.

Fee earned his first 15's cap on June 29, 2002 (Eagle #319) in a World Cup qualifying match against Canada. Fee scored his first and second try in 15's in only his third test match on August 10, 2002, in a 35-22 Eagles victory against Chile. Over the course of his career, Fee earned 28 caps for the Eagles, scoring nine tries which put him second on the USA career try scoring list (as of 2005).

Fee served double duty playing for both the 7's and 15's Eagles from 2002 to 2005. Fee was the captain of the 7's team from 2004 to 2005.

== Coaching ==
In 2018 Fee was with Indiana University Men's Rugby as the Director of Rugby and Head Coach for the Sevens program.

Previously, Fee served as head coach of the University of Notre Dame 7's team from 2012 to 2016. He is the Backs line coach for the USA High School All American Team and consults with the Youth Olympic Games Sevens program.

In 2023, Fee was appointed head coach of the Chicago Lions women’s 7s program, leading the team to three USA Club 7s National Championship finals appearances and two national titles (2023, 2025). Under his leadership, the program experienced significant expansion in player participation. In 2026, he expanded his role within the club to become head coach of the women’s XVs program.
