= John Tarpoff =

US international rugby union player

- Full name: John Alexander Tarpoff
- Born: April 5, 1980 (age 46) St Louis, Missouri; United States
- Height: 6 ft 3 in (191 cm)
- Weight: 255 lb (116 kg)

Rugby union career
- Position: Prop
International career
Years	Team	Apps	(Points)
2002–06	United States	12	(0)

John Alexander Tarpoff (born April 5, 1980) is an American former rugby union international.

Born in St Louis, Tarpoff grew up in the metro area, attending Edwardsville High School, Illinois.

Tarpoff, a prop, played for professional Welsh club Llanelli in 2002.

Capped 12-times for the United States, Tarpoff was an international player from 2002 to 2006 and was a member of the national squad at the 2003 Rugby World Cup in Australia, but didn't take the field during the tournament.

== See also ==
- List of United States national rugby union players
