= Nacanieli Seru =

Fiji international rugby union & league footballer (born 1969)

- Born: 20 July 1969 (age 57) Nawaikama, Gau Island, Lomaiviti Province, Fiji
- Height: 1.78 m (5 ft 10 in)
- Weight: 115 kg (18 st 2 lb)

Rugby union career
- Position: Prop
Amateur team(s)
Years	Team	Apps	(Points)
- QVSOB Rugby Club
–	Lomaiviti Rugby Club		
International career
Years	Team	Apps	(Points)
2003	Fiji	6	(0)
- Rugby league career

Playing information
- Position: Prop, Second-row
Representative
Years	Team	Pld	T	G	FG	P
1996	Fiji	1	0	0	0	0

Nacanieli Seru (born 20 July 1969 in Gau) was a Fijian rugby union & rugby league player. He played as a prop.

He is 1.78m tall and weighs 115 kg. He made his international debut on the tour to Australia in June 2003. A long-time member of the Suva squad, Naca won the selectors over with his aggressive front-row efforts at the trials that May. He got his first taste of action in Fiji's opening match of 2003 – a narrow one-point loss to the ACT Brumbies in Canberra, and later he made his Test debut coming on as a replacement against Argentina.

Seru also played rugby league in Australia before featuring for the Fiji Bati side from 1994 - 1996. He played one test for Fiji against Australia during the Super League war on 12 July 1996 in Newcastle, New South Wales.

He also played rugby union in Melbourne, Australia for the Powerhouse Rugby Club and Morrabin Rugby Club. He was also a member of the Victoria State side from 1997 - 1998. He was a member of the Fiji team to the 2003 Rugby World Cup.
