= Dan Dorsey =

US international rugby union player (born 1976)

- Full name: Daniel William Dorsey
- Born: January 18, 1976 (age 50) Inglewood, CA, United States
- Height: 5 ft 10 in (178 cm)
- Weight: 266 lb (121 kg)
- University: San Diego State University

Rugby union career
- Position: Prop
Senior career
Years	Team	Apps	(Points)
2001–02	Bath		
2002–03	Swansea		
2003–04	Rotherham Titans		
International career
Years	Team	Apps	(Points)
2001–04	United States	24	(5)

Daniel William Dorsey (born January 18, 1976) is an American former professional rugby union player.

Born in Inglewood, California, Dorsey was an American football defensive tackle for San Diego State University during the late 1990s, after arriving from El Camino College.

Dorsey, a heavyweight prop, was a United States representative from 2001 to 2004. His 24 caps included four matches at the 2003 Rugby World Cup in Australia, where he earned praise for a "monster tackle" on 21 stone Fijian prop Joeli Veitayaki. He also played rugby professionally in the United Kingdom, for Bath, Swansea and the Rotherham Titans.

== See also ==
- List of United States national rugby union players
