= John Buchholz (rugby union) =

US international rugby union player

- Full name: John Rowland Buchholz
- Born: February 26, 1979 (age 47) Santa Rosa, California, United States
- Height: 5 ft 9 in (175 cm)
- Weight: 175 lb (79 kg)
- School: Elsie Allen High School
- University: UC Berkeley
- Occupation: Attorney

Rugby union career
- Position: Fullback
International career
Years	Team	Apps	(Points)
2001–04	United States	9	(0)

John Rowland Buchholz (born February 26, 1979) is an American former rugby union international.

Buchholz was born in Santa Rosa, California and attended Elsie Allen High School.

A specialist fullback, Buchholz was a varsity player for the California Golden Bears and later turned out for San Francisco's Olympic Club. He gained nine caps for the United States between 2001 and 2004. This included three appearances at the 2003 Rugby World Cup held in Australia, where he featured in a win over Japan, as well as matches against Fiji and France. He was also an American representative in rugby sevens.

Buchholz is now an attorney.

== See also ==
- List of United States national rugby union players
