= Aisea Tuilevu =

Fiji international rugby union player

- Born: Aisea Tuilevu Kurimudu; 13 July 1972 (age 54) Sigatoka
- Height: 1.87 m (6 ft 1 1/2 in)
- Weight: 106 kg (234 lb)

Rugby union career
- Position(s): Wing centre
Provincial / State sides
Years	Team	Apps	(Points)
1996-1997	Waikato	12	(40)
1999-2001	North Harbour	27	(60)
2002-2004	Otago	17	(30)
- Correct as of 2007
Super Rugby
Years	Team	Apps	(Points)
2000	Blues	0	(0)
2001-2004	Highlanders	33	(80)
International career
Years	Team	Apps	(Points)
1996 - 2004	Fiji	19	(65)
National sevens team
Years	Team		Comps
1990-2006	Fiji		

Aisea Tuilevu Kurimudu (born 13 July 1972 in Sigatoka) is a Fijian rugby union footballer. He has represented the national team on numerous occasions, including at the 2003 Rugby World Cup in Australia. He has also played for the Highlanders and Blues in the international Super 12 competition, as well as Otago, Waikato and North Harbour in the National Provincial Championship in New Zealand.

After playing for Fiji at the Hong Kong 7s, he went on to make his Test debut for Fiji against South Africa in 1996 in Pretoria. He established himself in Fiji's starting lineup and featured in the qualifying games for the 1999 Rugby World Cup in Wales. He next played for Fiji in July 2003 and was then included in their 2003 Rugby World Cup squad, playing three games during the tournament, in which he scored 2 tries against Japan, and famously set up his country's first try in the match against Scotland. He has represented Fiji in 38 times, scoring 29 tries. His usual position is on the wing.

He now coaches Nadroga, in Fiji, and is a selector for Fiji Rugby Union.

== Fiji team ==
- Test debut: 1996 v South Africa in Pretoria
- 19 caps 13 tries 65 pts (38 games 30 tries 150 pts)
