= Mac McCallion =

- Full name: Warrick Lee McCallion (Note: Different sources give different versions of his first names as Warrick Lee, Warwick Lee, or Leigh Warwick.)
- Born: 26 July 1950
- Died: 14 March 2018 (aged 67) Manurewa, New Zealand

Rugby union career
- Position: Loose forward
Provincial / State sides
Years	Team	Apps	(Points)
1976–80	Counties	23	(28)
International career
Years	Team	Apps	(Points)
1978–79	New Zealand Māori	8	(4)
Coaching career
- Years: Team
- 1995–99: Counties Manukau
- 1996–99: Blues (assistant)
- 2002–03: Fiji

Warrick Lee "Mac" McCallion (26 July 1950 – 14 March 2018) was a New Zealand rugby union player and coach.

McCallion served in the Royal New Zealand Infantry Regiment of the New Zealand Army during the Vietnam War. Aged 17, and having lied about his age to enlist, he was a member of the secret Faceless 26 Ghost Unit of the New Zealand Special Air Service.

After the war, he played for Counties from 1976 to 1980, and made eight appearances for New Zealand Māori in the late 1970s.

McCallion was named New Zealand coach of the year for his work with the NPC Division One team Counties in both 1996 and 1997. He enhanced his reputation further as Graham Henry's assistant at the Auckland Blues during a four-year spell that saw them reach three consecutive Super 12 finals, lifting the trophy on two occasions in 1997 and 1998. McCallion had two children, Zeb and Dion.

McCallion was appointed Fiji's national coaching director in March 2002. He took the Fiji national team to the 2003 Rugby World Cup, but quit later that year, citing frustration at Fiji being overlooked for tournaments by the stronger rugby nations.

== Notes ==
Sporting positions
Preceded by (Fiji) Ifereimi Tawake (caretaker)	Fiji National Rugby Union Coach; 2002–2003	Succeeded by (New Zealand) Wayne Pivac
