= Emori Katalau =

Fijian rugby union player (born 1967)

- Born: Emori Sarogo Katalau; April 9, 1967 (age 59) Rakiraki District, Fiji, Ra Province, Fiji
- Height: 6 ft 6 in (198 cm)
- Weight: 198 lb (90 kg)

Rugby union career
- Position: Lock
Amateur team(s)
Years	Team	Apps	(Points)
1992-1993	Rangatira		
1993-1994	Marist		
1994-1996	Marist Old Boys		
Senior career
Years	Team	Apps	(Points)
199?-199?	Tailevu		
199?-1992	Ra		
1997-1998	Exeter		
1999-2000	Dunvant RFC	6	(0)
2000-2003	Llanelli RFC		
Provincial / State sides
Years	Team	Apps	(Points)
1992-1996	Poverty Bay	44	(10)
1996-1997	North Harbour		(0)
International career
Years	Team	Apps	(Points)
1995-2003	Fiji	48	(20)

Emori Katalau (born on 9 April 1967 in Rakiraki) is a Fijian former rugby union player who played as lock. He is nicknamed "Skylab" due to his line-out jumps. Currently, he coaches Rhigos RFC.

== Career ==
Katalau first played for Fiji against Canada, in Nadi, on 8 April 1995. He also played in the 1999 Rugby World Cup, where he played 4 matches, as well in the 2003 Rugby World Cup, playing only the match against Japan, on 23 October 2003, in Townsville being his last international cap. He played his club career for Poverty Bay, North Harbour, Exeter Chiefs, Dunvant RFC and Llanelli RFC.
