= Dave Hodges (rugby union) =

American businessman and rugby union player (born 1968)

David Hodges
- Born: September 15, 1968 (age 58) Long Beach, California, United States
- Height: 6 ft 4 in (1.93 m)
- Weight: 245 lb (111 kg; 17.5 st)

Rugby union career
- Position(s): Flanker; Number 8
Amateur team(s)
Years	Team	Apps	(Points)
1990–1991	Occidental College		
1995–1997	Old Mission Beach Athletic Club		
Senior career
Years	Team	Apps	(Points)
1997–1999	Llanelli	55	(45)
1999–2000	Bridgend		
2000–2004	Llanelli	73	(35)
2003–2004	Llanelli Scarlets	22	(5)
International career
Years	Team	Apps	(Points)
1996–2004	United States	54	(20)
Coaching career
- Years: Team
- 2005–2006: United States (assistant)
- 2007–2009: Denver Barbarians
- 2009–2012: United States (assistant)

David Hodges (born September 15, 1968) is an American former professional rugby union player and coach. As a player, he predominantly played in the back row, either as a flanker or as a number 8, but he also played as a lock on occasion. He spent his entire professional career in Wales from 1997 to 2004, mainly with Llanelli RFC and the Llanelli Scarlets, although he spent one season with Bridgend in 1999–2000. He earned 54 caps for the United States national team between 1996 and 2004, including 28 as captain, a record that stood until 2013. He retired from professional rugby in January 2005 after tearing a pectoral muscle in his final appearance.

He was an assistant coach of the United States national team. Hodges also played and coached American football at the collegiate level.

== High school and collegiate years ==
Hodges played American football at Long Beach Wilson High School in Long Beach, California, as a linebacker. It was during this period that he saw his first rugby match as Belmont Shore Rugby Club practiced and played their matches on the same field as the high school football team.

Hodges attended Occidental College in Los Angeles, California, and played football throughout his time there, receiving accolades in each of his four collegiate seasons. He was named a Kodak All-American football player, an award given annually to the best American college football players at their respective positions.

Hodges began playing rugby at 18 as a freshman at Occidental College. Within two years, he was named as a Collegiate All-American in 1990 and 1991.

== Professional rugby career ==
Hodges played professional rugby with Llanelli RFC from 1997–1999 and 2000–2005. Hodges played for Bridgend RFC in 1999–2000. He was named Llanelli's player of the season in 2001–02. He was also the strength coach for the Llanelli Scarlets from 2001 to 2004.

In 2009, Hodges was named Player of the Decade (2000–2009) by Rugby Magazine.

== International rugby career ==
Hodges was capped 54 times by the United States national rugby union team at lock, flanker and at number eight. He made his debut as a substitute against Uruguay in 1996 at Fletcher's Fields in Markham, Ontario, Canada.

Hodges was the U.S. national team captain 27 times from 2000 to 2003. Hodges won the USA Rugby Athlete of the Year in 2005.

A match between the United States and France on July 3, 2004, marked the final game that Hodges represented the United States as a player. After nine years of service to the Eagles, Hodges explained his decision to retire. "I think now is the right time. I'm still playing at a high level and I think I wanted to be a part of the team, as long as I was selected, and of the transition . . . We’re building for the next World Cup and so the more I stay around, that’s one less guy in the XV that coach has experience for the next World Cup."

== Honors ==
=== Rugby union ===
- 1990, 1991 All-American Collegiate XV
- 1995–1997 Member of 1996 National Championship team OMBAC
- 2000-2003 USA NATIONAL TEAM CAPTAIN 27 Times
- 2001–2002 Llanelli Scarlets Player of the Year
- 1996–2004 USA NATIONAL TEAM 54 Times
- 2009 USA Rugby Union Player of the Decade (Rugby Magazine)

=== American football ===
- 1986–89 All-Southern California Intercollegiate Athlete Conference Team
- 1989 MVP All Southern California Intercollegiate Athlete Conference
- 1989 Kodak All American
