= Nicky Little =

Fiji international rugby union player

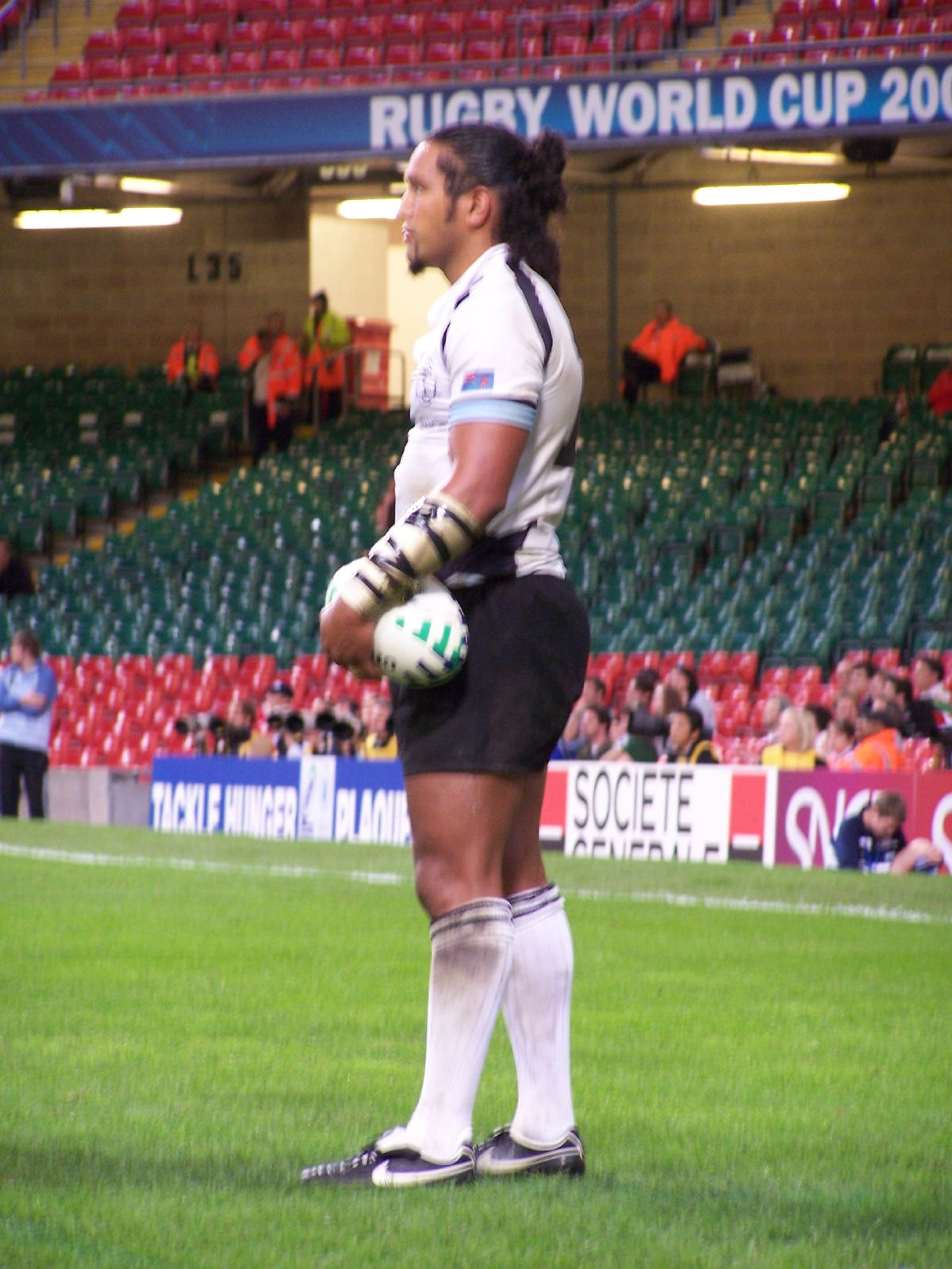
- Little in 2007
- Born: Nick Tyrone Little; 13 September 1976 (age 50) Tokoroa, New Zealand
- Height: 1.83 m (6 ft 0 in)
- Weight: 96 kg (15 st 2 lb; 212 lb)
- School: Te Awamutu College
- Notable relative(s): Walter Little (uncle); Lawrence Little (uncle)

Rugby union career
- Position: Fly-half
Amateur team(s)
Years	Team	Apps	(Points)
1994–1996	Te Awamutu		
Senior career
Years	Team	Apps	(Points)
1996–1997	Canterbury		
1997–1998	Waikato		
1998–1999	North Harbour		
1999–2001	Sale	38	(287)
2001	Dax		
2001–2002	Pontypridd	14	
2002–2006	Saracens	49	(287)
2006	Calvisano		
2006–2009	Petrarca Padova	55	(291)
2009–2010	Bath	21	(123)
2010–2011	Bristol	14	(104)
2011–2012	Esher	10	(32)
2012–2013	Canterbury	3	(0)
International career
Years	Team	Apps	(Points)
1996–2011	Fiji	71	(670)
Coaching career
- Years: Team
- 2012–: Canterbury Academy
- 2013–: Fiji (assistant)

Nicky Tyrone Little (born 13 September 1976) is a former professional rugby union footballer. He plays at fly-half. He is a nephew of All Blacks centre Walter Little, but represents Fiji at international level.

== Career ==
He has scored 652 points for Fiji and is the Pacific region's highest point scorer. He previously played for Canterbury and North Harbour in New Zealand provincial rugby, before moving to England where he played for the Sale Sharks in late 1999. He signed with Dax in France, but soon moved to Pontypridd, before signing with the Saracens.

Little made his test debut for Fiji in 1996 in a match against the Springboks in Pretoria, at just 19 years of age. He finished the 2000 and 2001 Pacific Rim tournaments as the top points scorer. He entered the 2003 Rugby World Cup as Fiji's all-time highest points scorer, with 488 points. He got four caps for Fiji at the 2003 World Cup, scoring a total of 45 points in those games. At the 2007 event he starred as Fiji defeated Wales to reach the quarter-finals, but was injured late in the final group game, after straining his medial knee ligaments and missed the quarter-final.

On 15 July 2009, it was announced that Little had signed a one-year deal with Bath, with Head Coach Steve Meehan stating that he would be in the squad for the tour to Portugal in late July 2009.

On 26 February 2010 it was announced that Little would be playing for Bristol Rugby from the 2010–11 season onwards. But at the end of the 2010/2011 season it was announced that Little would be part of the clearout of players departing Bristol Rugby.

At the midpoint of the 2011/12 season, it was announced that Little was joining RFU Championship side Esher RFC.

At the start of the 2012/13 season Little became part of a joint venture with Simon Langton Grammar School for Boys, and The Canterbury High School. Canterbury's Elite Rugby Player Development Centre, headed by Little, is the first of its kind within the country and its aim is to develop grass roots rugby within the area.
