= Kitione Salawa (rugby union, born 1976) =

- Born: July 26, 1976 (age 50) Lautoka, Fiji
- Height: 1.90 m (6 ft 3 in)
- Weight: 87 kg (192 lb)

Rugby union career
- Position: Flanker
Senior career
Years	Team	Apps	(Points)
- Gaunavou
Provincial / State sides
Years	Team	Apps	(Points)
- Nadi
International career
Years	Team	Apps	(Points)
2003	Fiji	2	(0)

Kitione Salawa (born Lautoka, 26 July 1976), is a Fijian former rugby union player, who played as flanker.

== Career ==
He first played for Fiji on 4 July 2003, against Tonga, in Nadi. Salawa was also member of the Fiji squad for the 2003 Rugby World Cup, playing two matches in the tournament, with the match against Scotland, on 1 November 2003, in Sydney as his last match for Fiji.
