= Joeli Veitayaki =

Fiji international rugby union player

- Born: Joeli Saroinicava Veitayaki; 12 January 1967 Matuku, Fiji
- Died: 21 October 2025 (aged 58) Whangarei, New Zealand
- Height: 6 ft 1 in (1.85 m)
- Weight: 286 lb (130 kg; 20.4 st)
- Notable relatives: Haereiti Hetet (son); Pauliasi Tabulutu (uncle)

Rugby union career
- Position: Prop
Amateur team(s)
Years	Team	Apps	(Points)
1991–1993	Tihoi		
1994–1996	Kio Kio United		
1997–1998	Old Boys		
2000–2001	Mid Northern		
Senior career
Years	Team	Apps	(Points)
2001–2003	Ulster		
Provincial / State sides
Years	Team	Apps	(Points)
1991–1996	King Country	64	(65)
1997–2001	Northland	35	(15)
Super Rugby
Years	Team	Apps	(Points)
1996	Chiefs	11	(10)
1999	Blues	2	(0)
International career
Years	Team	Apps	(Points)
1994–2003	Fiji	49	(15)

Joeli Veitayaki (12 January 1967 – 21 October 2025) was a Fijian rugby union player. His usual position was Prop. He made his debut for Fiji against the New Zealand Maori in Christchurch on 4 June 1994. He played at the 1999 and 2003 Rugby World Cup. He had six daughters and two sons, Serah, Marilyn, Raijieli, Ruth, Talei, Analie, Manawa and Haereiti Veitayaki.

His son Haereiti Hetet has also followed in his father's footsteps in playing for the Flying Fijians at prop.

Veitayaki played for the Blues and Northland. He made his Super Rugby debut for the Blues against the Sharks in 1999. He also had a stint with Irish club Ulster. Veitayaki had undergone a kidney transplant in January 2025 at the Auckland City Hospital.

Veitayaki died on 21 October 2025, at the age of 58.
