= Alfie Mocelutu =

- Full name: Alivereti Mocelutu Vuivau
- Born: 9 July 1971 (age 55) Fiji
- Height: 190 cm (6 ft 3 in)
- Weight: 110 kg (17 st 5 lb; 243 lb)

Rugby union career
- Position: Flanker
- Current team: Ospreys
Senior career
Years	Team	Apps	(Points)
1994–1999	Honda Heat		
2002–2003	Neath	6	(10)
2003–2005	Ospreys		
International career
Years	Team	Apps	(Points)
1994–2003	Fiji	34	(20)
- Correct as of 19 February 2017

Alfie Moceulutu (born 9 July 1971) is a Fijian former rugby union footballer who played for Ospreys regional team as a flanker. He won 34 caps for Fiji, scoring 4 tries.

Moceulutu made his debut for the Ospreys regional team in 2003 having previously played for the Neath RFC, Caerphilly RFC and Honda Heat.
