= 2006 Pacific Islanders rugby union tour of Europe =

Summary
P	W	D	L
Total
3	0	0	3
Test match
3	0	0	3
Opponent
P	W	D	L
Wales
1	0	0	1
Scotland
1	0	0	1
Ireland
1	0	0	1

The 2006 Pacific Islanders rugby union tour of Europe was a series of test matches played by the Pacific Islanders team in Wales, Scotland, and Ireland during November 2006.

The Pacific Islanders lost all three test matches against Wales and France, and Ireland. The head coach for the tour was former Samoa player Pat Lam. The captain for the tour was Fijian Simon Raiwalui.

== The Matches ==
=== Wales ===
11 November 2006

Wales	38–20	Pacific Islanders
Try: Byrne, Hook; Mark Jones, Morgan, Sweeney; Con: Sweeney 5 Pen: Sweeney		Try: Mapusua, Ratuvou; Va'a; Con: Pisi; Pen: Pisi

Millennium Stadium, Cardiff
Attendance: 51,000
Referee: Wayne Barnes (England)

Team details

Wales
Kevin Morgan	FB	15	FB	Norman Ligairi
Lee Byrne	W	14	W	Lome Fa'atau
Sonny Parker	C	13	C	Seru Rabeni
James Hook	C	12	C	Seilala Mapusua
Mark Jones	W	11	W	Sailosi Tagicakibau
Ceri Sweeney	FH	10	FH	Tusi Pisi (yellow card)
Mike Phillips	SH	9	SH	Moses Rauluni
Alix Popham	N8	8	N8	Hale T-Pole
Gavin Thomas	F	7	F	Nili Latu Langilangi
Alun Wyn Jones	F	6	F	Semo Sititi
Robert Sidoli	L	5	L	Daniel Leo
Michael Owen	L	4	L	Simon Raiwalui (capt.)
Chris Horsman	P	3	P	Tevita Taumoepeau
T. Rhys Thomas	H	2	H	Mahonri Schwalger
(capt.) Duncan Jones	P	1	P	Justin Va'a
		Replacements
(substituted in) Huw Bennett	H	16	H	Aleki Lutui (substituted in)
(substituted in) Adam Jones	P	17	P	Census Johnston (substituted in)
Gethin Jenkins		18	BR	Maama Molitika (substituted in)
(substituted in) Jonathan Thomas	L	19	C	Epi Taione (substituted in)
(substituted in) Gareth Cooper	SH	20	SH	Junior Poluleuligaga (substituted in)
(substituted in) Gavin Evans	C	21	C	Seremaia Baikeinuku (substituted in)
(substituted in) Shane Williams	W	22	W	Kameli Ratuvou (substituted in)

=== Scotland ===
18 November 2006

Scotland	34–22	Pacific Islanders
Try: Di Rollo, Henderson; Brown, Callam; Con: Paterson 4 Pen: Paterson; Drop: Di Rollo		Try: Caucaunibuca; Leo, Ratuvou 2 Con: Pisi

Murrayfield Stadium, Edinburgh
Attendance: 19,055
Referee: Bryce Lawrence (New Zealand)

Team details

Scotland
(capt.) Chris Paterson	FB	15	FB	Norman Ligairi
Sean Lamont	W	14	W	Lome Fa'atau
Marcus Di Rollo	C	13	C	Kameli Ratuvou
Andrew Henderson	C	12	C	Elvis Seveali'i
Simon Webster	W	11	W	Rupeni Caucaunibuca
Dan Parks	FH	10	FH	Tusi Pisi
Chris Cusiter	SH	9	SH	Moses Rauluni
Johnnie Beattie	N8	8	N8	Epi Taione (yellow card)
Kelly Brown	F	7	F	Nili Latu Langilangi
Simon Taylor	F	6	F	Viliami Vaki
Scott Murray	L	5	L	Daniel Leo
Nathan Hines	L	4	L	Simon Raiwalui (capt.)
Euan Murray	P	3	P	Tevita Taumoepeau
Dougie Hall	H	2	H	Mahonri Schwalger
Gavin Kerr	P	1	P	Taufaʻao Filise
		Replacements
(substituted in) Ross Ford	H	16	H	Aleki Lutui (substituted in)
(substituted in) Allan Jacobsen	P	17	P	Justin Va'a (substituted in)
(substituted in) Alastair Kellock	L	18	BR	Maama Molitika (substituted in)
(substituted in) David Callam	N8	19	F	Semo Sititi (substituted in)
(substituted in) Mike Blair	SH	20		Junior Poluleuligaga
(substituted in) Phil Godman	FH	21	C	Seremaia Baikeinuku (substituted in)
(substituted in) Hugo Southwell	FB	22	C	Seru Rabeni (substituted in)

=== Ireland ===
26 November 2006

Ireland	61–17	Pacific Islanders
Try: R. Best, Easterby 2 Hickie, Horgan; O'Connell, O'Kelly; Wallace; Con: Wallace 6 Pen: Wallace 3		Try: Fa'atau; Pisi, Rabeni; Con: Pisi

Lansdowne Road, Dublin
Attendance: 43,000
Referee: Christophe Berdos (France)

Team details

Ireland
Girvan Dempsey	FB	15	FB	Norman Ligairi
Luke Fitzgerald	W	14	W	Lome Fa'atau
(capt.) Brian O'Driscoll	C	13	C	Seru Rabeni
Shane Horgan	C	12	C	Elvis Seveali'i
Denis Hickie	W	11	W	Kameli Ratuvou
Paddy Wallace	FH	10	FH	Tusi Pisi
Peter Stringer	SH	9	SH	Moses Rauluni
Jamie Heaslip	N8	8	N8	Hale T-Pole
Steve Ferris	F	7	F	Nili Latu Langilangi
Simon Easterby	F	6	F	Maama Molitika
Paul O'Connell	L	5	L	Daniel Leo
Malcolm O'Kelly	L	4	L	Simon Raiwalui (capt.)
John Hayes	P	3	P	Tevita Taumoepeau
Frankie Sheahan	H	2	H	Aleki Lutui
Bryan Young	P	1	P	Justin Va'a (yellow card)
		Replacements
(substituted in) Rory Best	H	16		Ace Tiatia
(substituted in) Simon Best	P	17	P	Taufaʻao Filise (substituted in)
(substituted in) Donncha O'Callaghan	L	18	C	Epi Taione (substituted in)
(substituted in) Denis Leamy	BR	19	F	Aca Ratuva (substituted in)
(substituted in) Isaac Boss	SH	20	SH	Junior Poluleuligaga (substituted in)
(substituted in) Ronan O'Gara	FH	21	C	Seilala Mapusua (substituted in)
(substituted in) Gordon D'Arcy	C	22	W	Alesana Tuilagi (substituted in)

== See also ==
- 2006 end-of-year rugby union tests
