= List of Saracens F.C. players selected for international rugby =

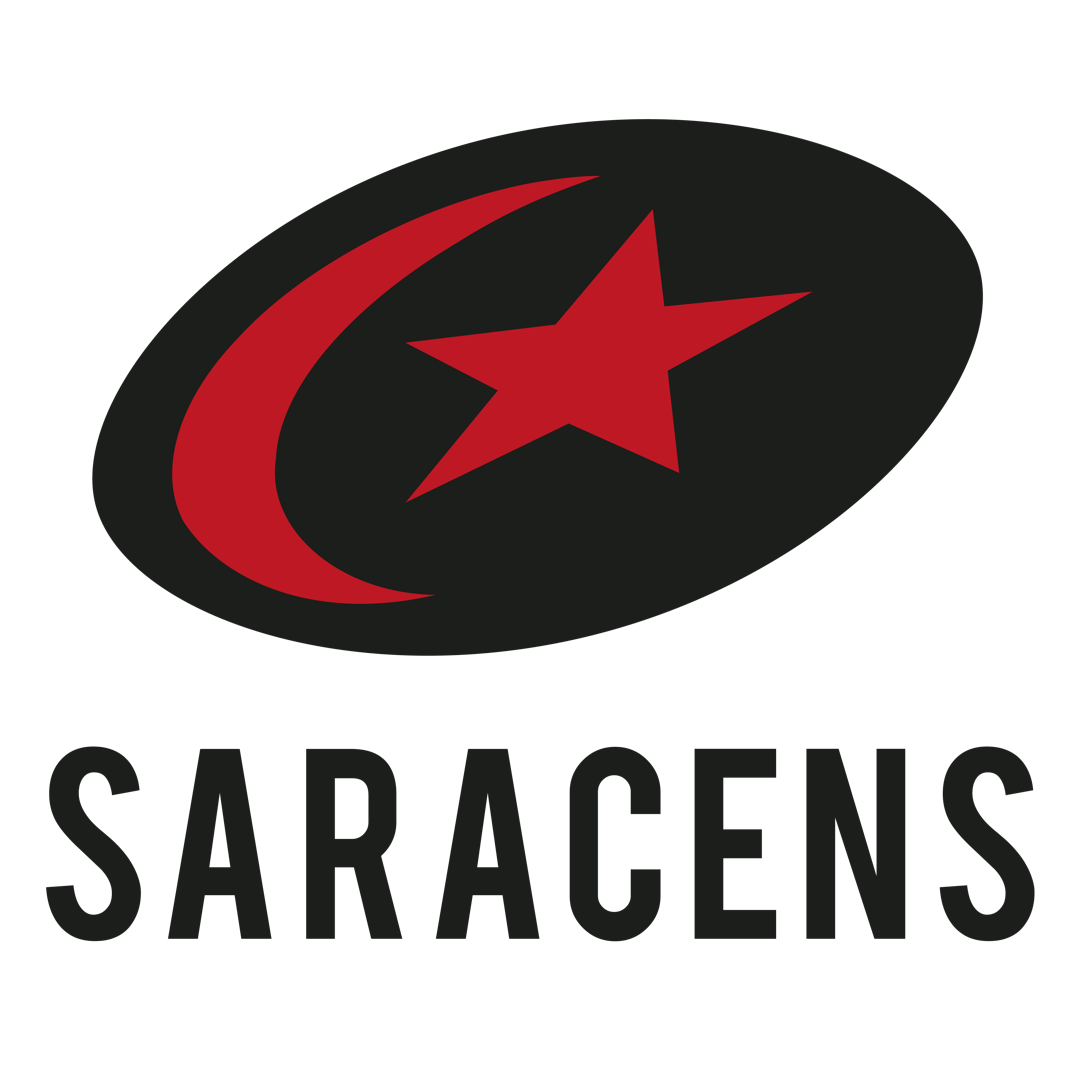
Saracens logo.

This article documents current and former players for English rugby union club Saracens, who have received at least one senior international cap representing their respective national test or sevens teams, during the course of their professional sporting career.

- Players listed in **bold** are current members of the Saracens squad, as of the 2026–27 season.
- Players listed in italics are products of the academy system at Saracens.
- Players who have only represented their countries at junior level, or in non-test friendly matches, are not included on this list.

== England ==
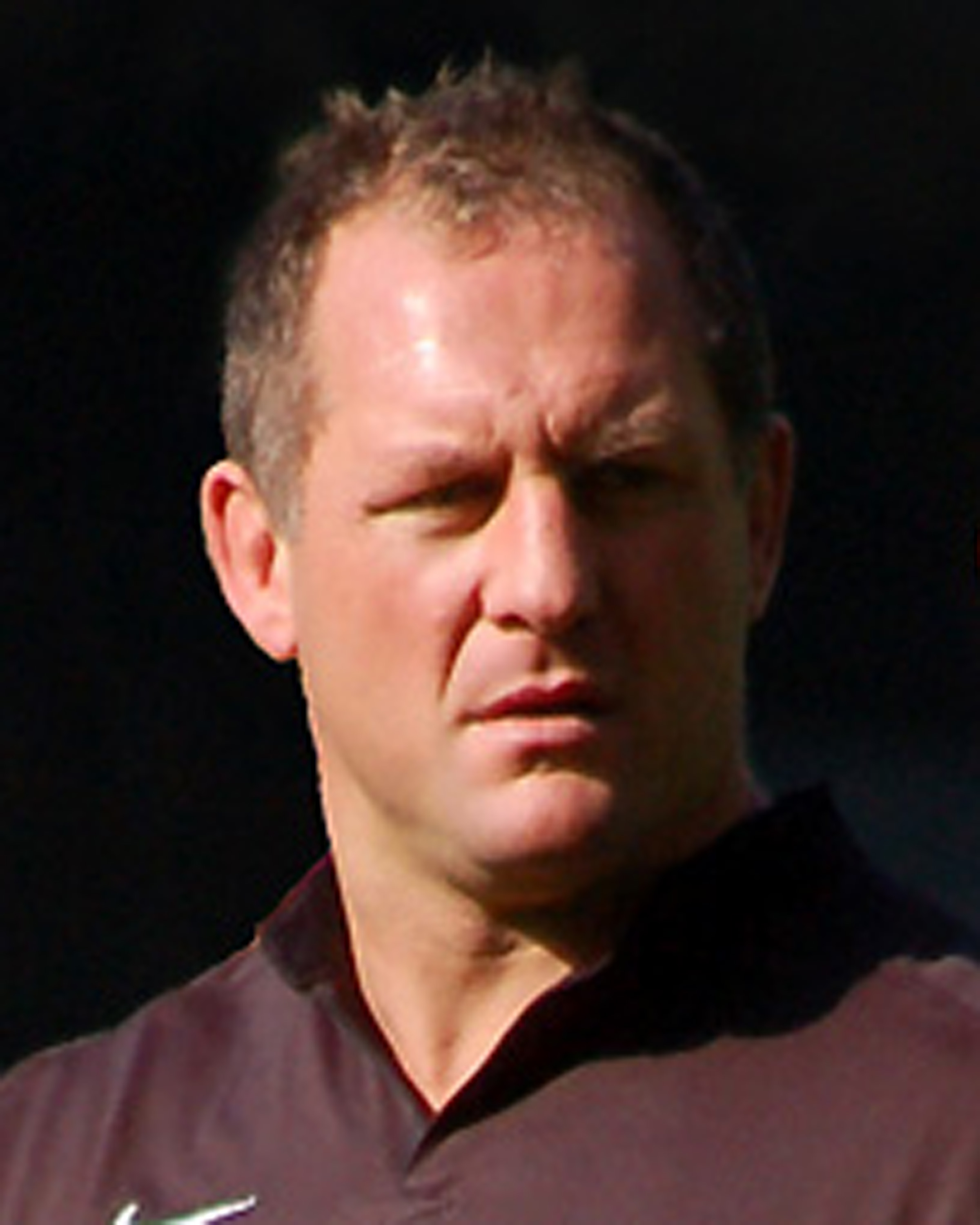
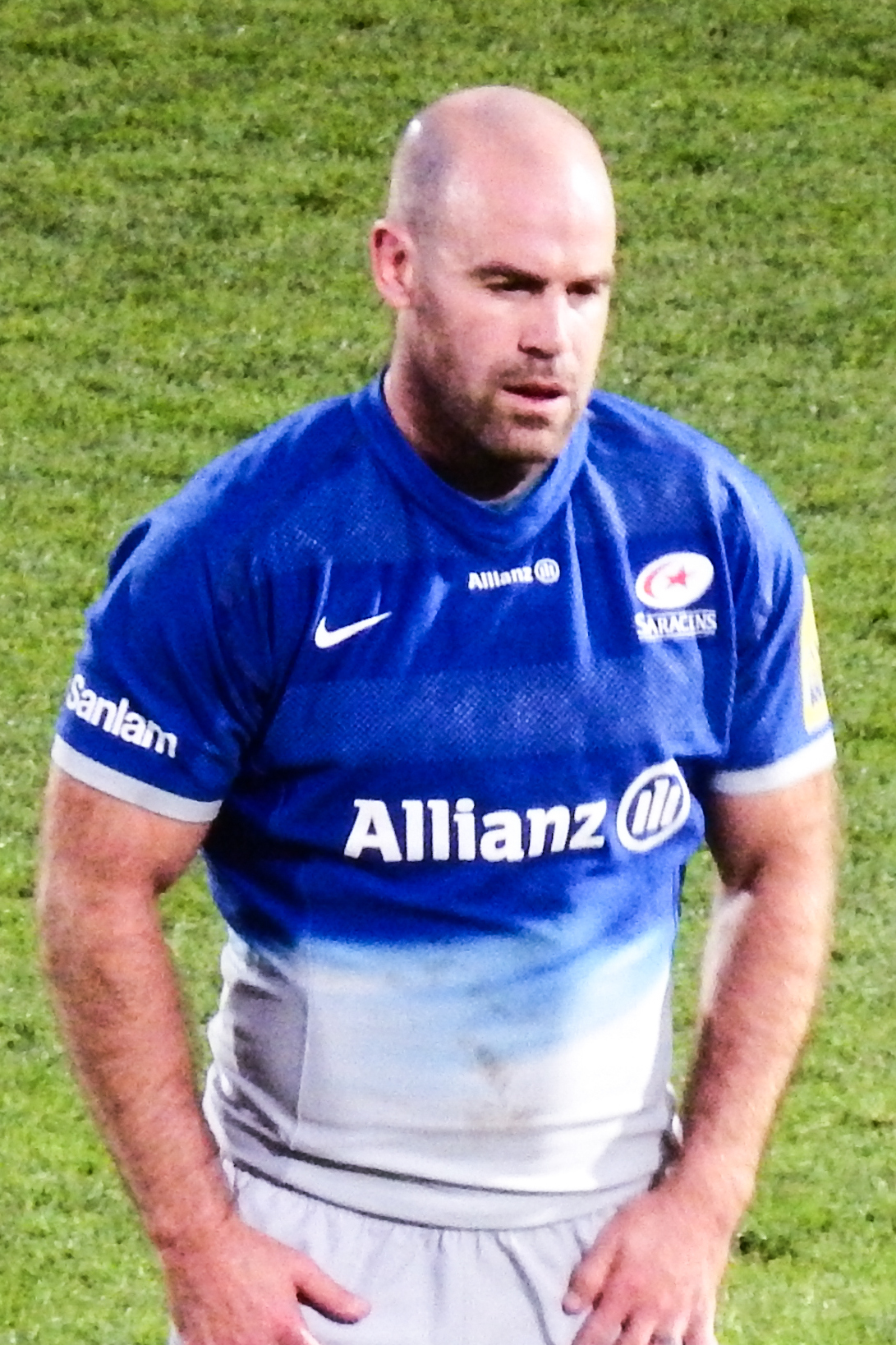
Left: Richard Hill (England, B&I Lions) played for Saracens from 1993 to 2008.
Right: Charlie Hodgson (England, B&I Lions) played for Saracens from 2011 to 2016.
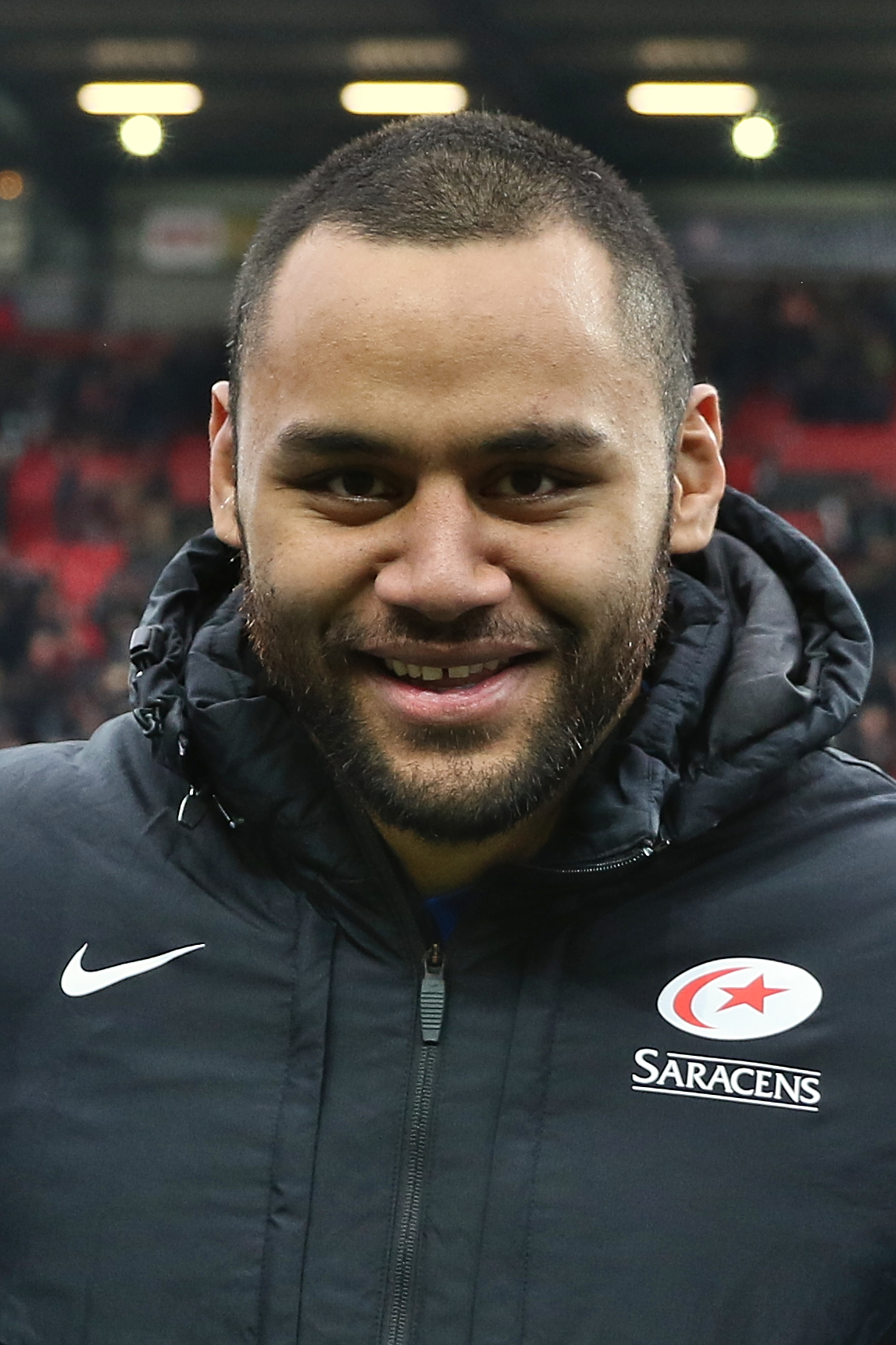
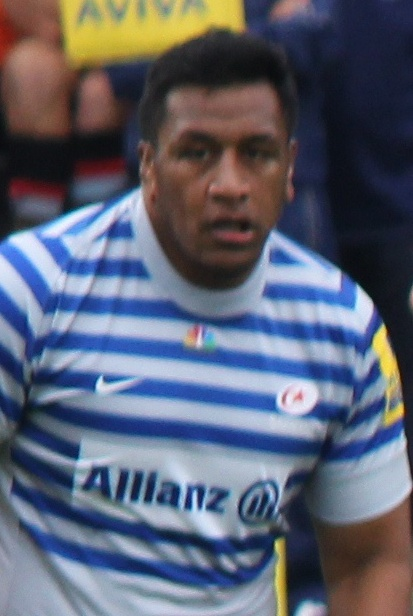
Left: Billy Vunipola (England, B&I Lions) played for Saracens from 2013 to 2024.
Right: Mako Vunipola (England, B&I Lions) played for Saracens from 2011 to 2024.
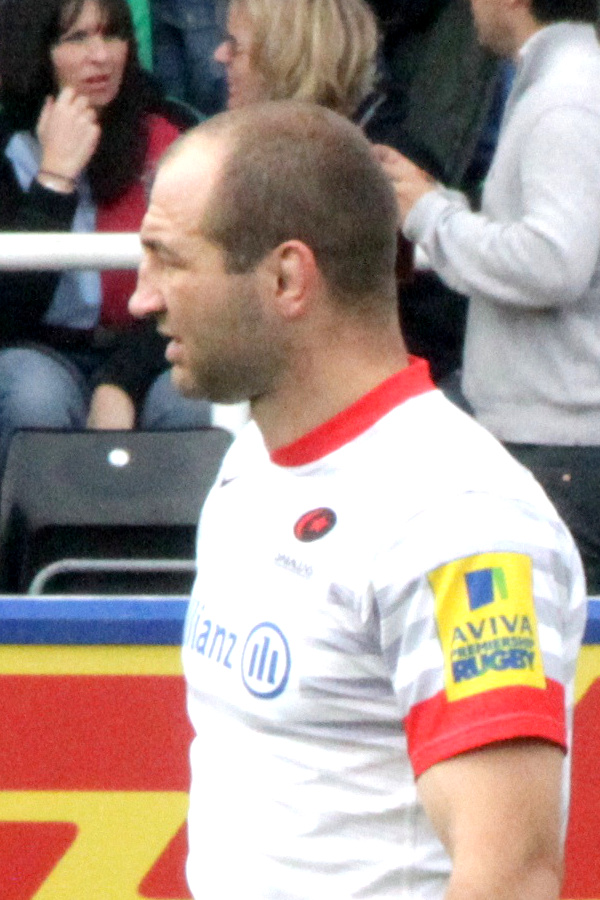
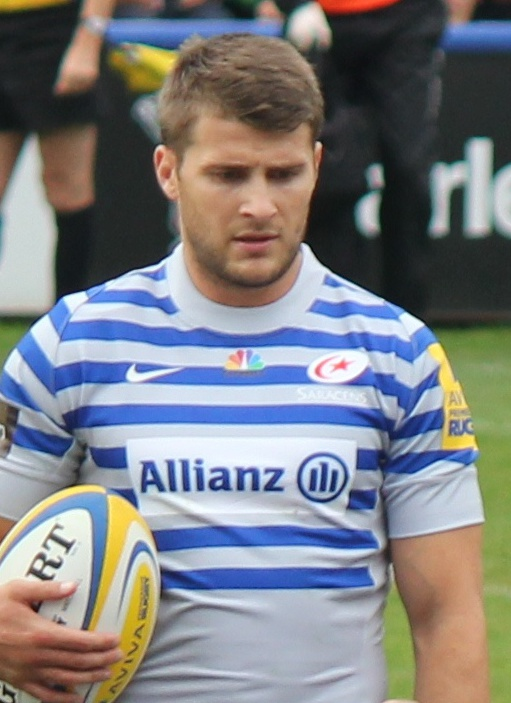
Left: Steve Borthwick (England) played for Saracens from 2008 to 2014.
Right: Richard Wigglesworth (England) played for Saracens from 2010 to 2020.
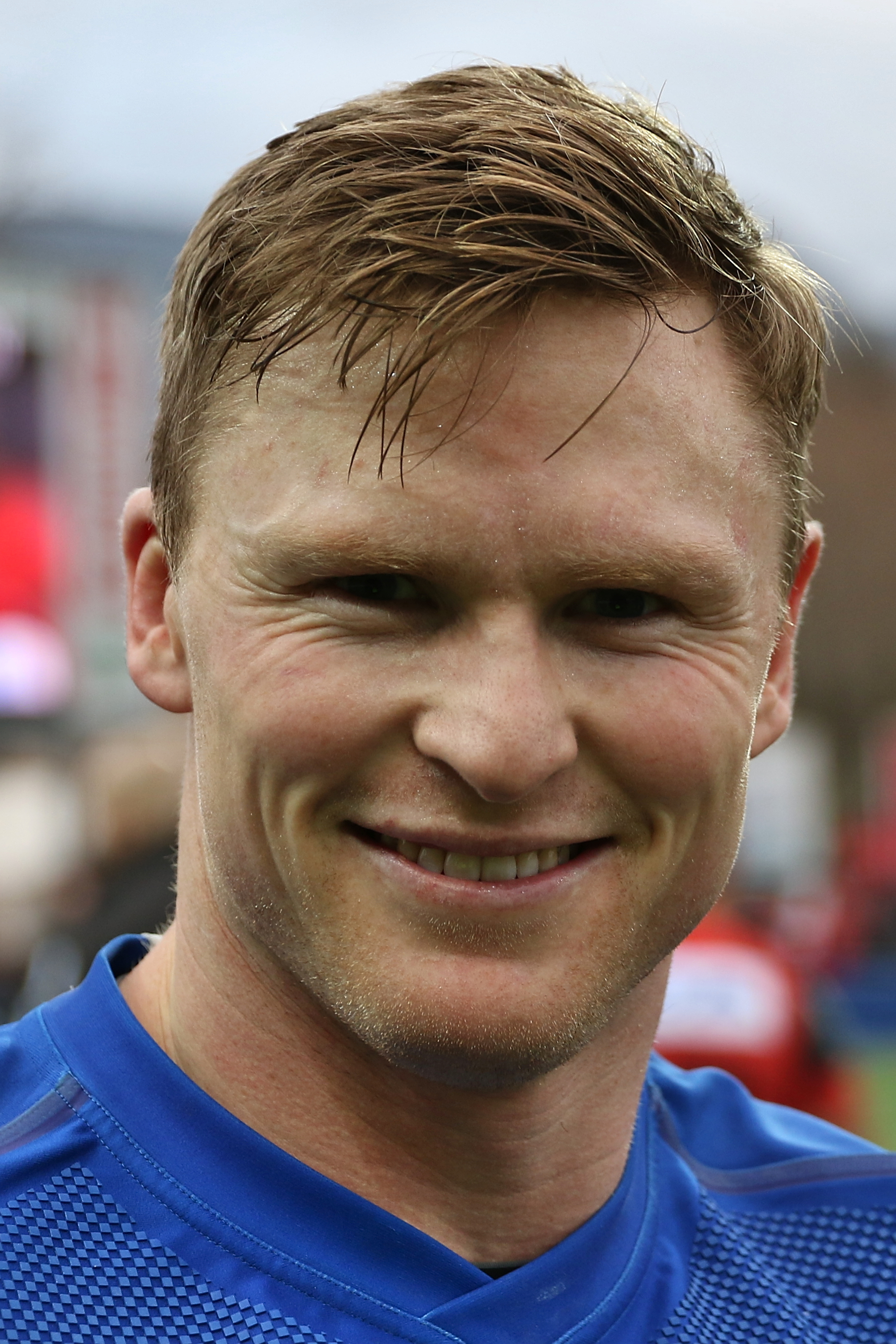
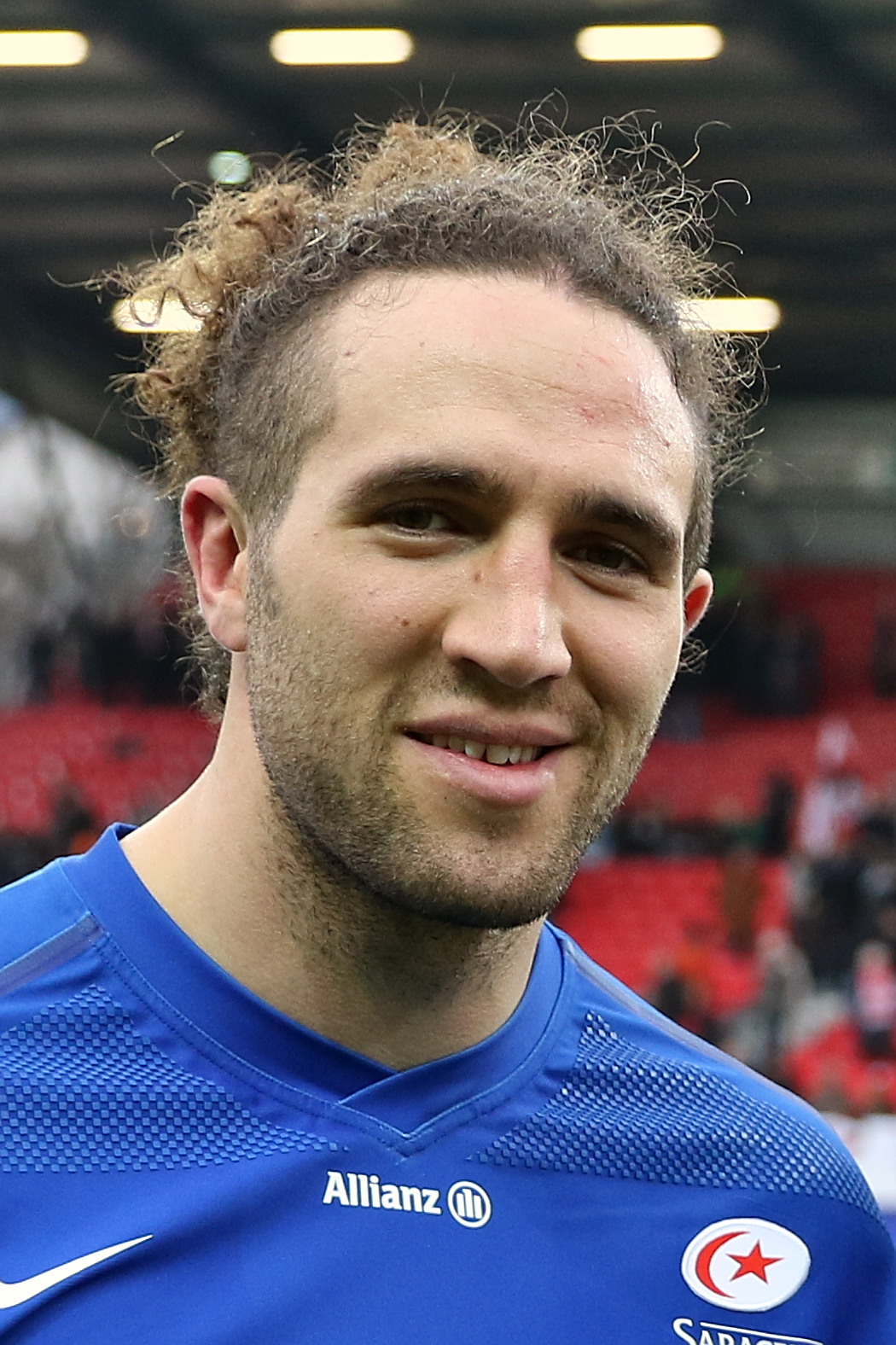
Left: Chris Ashton (England) played for Saracens from 2012 to 2017.
Right: Mike Ellery (England 7s) played for Saracens from 2014 to 2018.

The following Saracens players, past and present, have represented England at senior international level:

- Steffon Armitage
- Chris Ashton
- Donald Barrell (7s)
- Kevin Barrett (7s)
- Brad Barritt
- Steve Borthwick
- Mouritz Botha
- Kyran Bracken
- John Buckton
- Matt Cairns
- **Noah Caluori**
- Justyn Cassell (7s)
- Noah Cato (7s)
- Kris Chesney (7s)
- George Chuter
- Calum Clark
- Ben Clarke
- Alex Codling
- **Elliot Daly**
- **Theo Dan**
- Tony Diprose
- David Duffus (7s)
- **Ben Earl**
- Mike Ellery (7s)
- Andy Farrell
- **Owen Farrell**
- David Flatman
- Mike Forshaw (RL)
- **Jamie George**
- Alex Goode
- Andy Goode
- Joe Gray
- Danny Grewcock
- Vic Harding
- Ben Harris (7s)
- Richard Haughton (7s)
- Richard Hill
- Charlie Hodgson
- Michael Horak (Note: Michael Horak represented South Africa in rugby league, before switching his allegiance to England in rugby union.)
- Tom Howe (7s)
- **Nick Isiekwe**
- **Maro Itoje**
- Ben Johnston
- George Kruis
- Jason Leonard
- Alex Lozowski
- Dan Luger
- **Max Malins**
- Mark Mapletoft
- Ollie Marchon (7s)
- **George Martin**
- Nathan McAvoy (RL)
- Nils Mordt (7s)
- Nnamdi Obi (7s)
- Rodd Penney (7s)
- Alex Rae (7s)
- Steve Ravenscroft
- Tony Roques (7s)
- Ben Russell (7s)
- Dean Ryan
- Alex Sanderson
- Dan Scarbrough
- David Seymour (7s)
- George Sherriff
- Joe Simpson
- Jack Singleton
- Ben Skirving
- Kevin Sorrell (7s)
- Ben Spencer
- Sam Stanley (7s)
- John Steeds
- Matt Stevens
- David Strettle
- Ben Sturnham
- Rob Thirlby (7s)
- Joel Tomkins
- Billy Vunipola
- Mako Vunipola
- Hugh Vyvyan
- Nick Walshe
- Marcus Watson (7s)
- Julian White
- Richard Wigglesworth
- Tom Willis
- Jack Wilson (7s) (Note: Jack Wilson earned his first international rugby sevens caps for New Zealand in 2012, before switching his allegiance to England in 2016.)
- Kevin Yates

=== Captains ===
The following Saracens players, past and present, have held the captaincy for England at test level during their professional career.

- Steve Borthwick
  - (2008–2010)
- Kyran Bracken
  - (2001)
- Tony Diprose
  - (1998)
- Owen Farrell
  - (2018–2023)
- Jamie George
  - (2024, 2025)
- Maro Itoje
  - (2025)
- Jason Leonard
  - (1996, 2003)

=== World Champions ===
The following Saracens alumni won the Rugby World Cup with England during their test career.

- Kyran Bracken
  - (2003)
- Danny Grewcock
  - (2003)
- Richard Hill
  - (2003)
- Dan Luger
  - (2003)
- Jason Leonard
  - (2003)
- Julian White
  - (2003)

=== British and Irish Lions ===
The following England internationals, who have played for Saracens during their professional career, have been called up to tour with the British and Irish Lions.

4 tours

- Owen Farrell
  - (2013, 2017, 2021, 2025)

3 tours

- Elliot Daly
  - (2017, 2021, 2025)
- Jamie George
  - (2017, 2021, 2025)
- Richard Hill
  - (1997, 2001, 2005)
- Maro Itoje
  - (2017, 2021, 2025)
- Jason Leonard
  - (1993, 1997, 2001)
- Mako Vunipola
  - (2013, 2017, 2021)

2 tours

- Danny Grewcock
  - (2001, 2005)
- Matt Stevens
  - (2005, 2013)

1 tour

- Brad Barritt
  - (2013)
- Ben Clarke
  - (1993)
- Tony Diprose
  - (1997)
- Ben Earl
  - (2025)
- Charlie Hodgson
  - (2005)
- George Kruis
  - (2017)
- Dan Luger
  - (2001)
- Billy Vunipola
  - (2017)
- Julian White
  - (2005)

== UK and Ireland ==
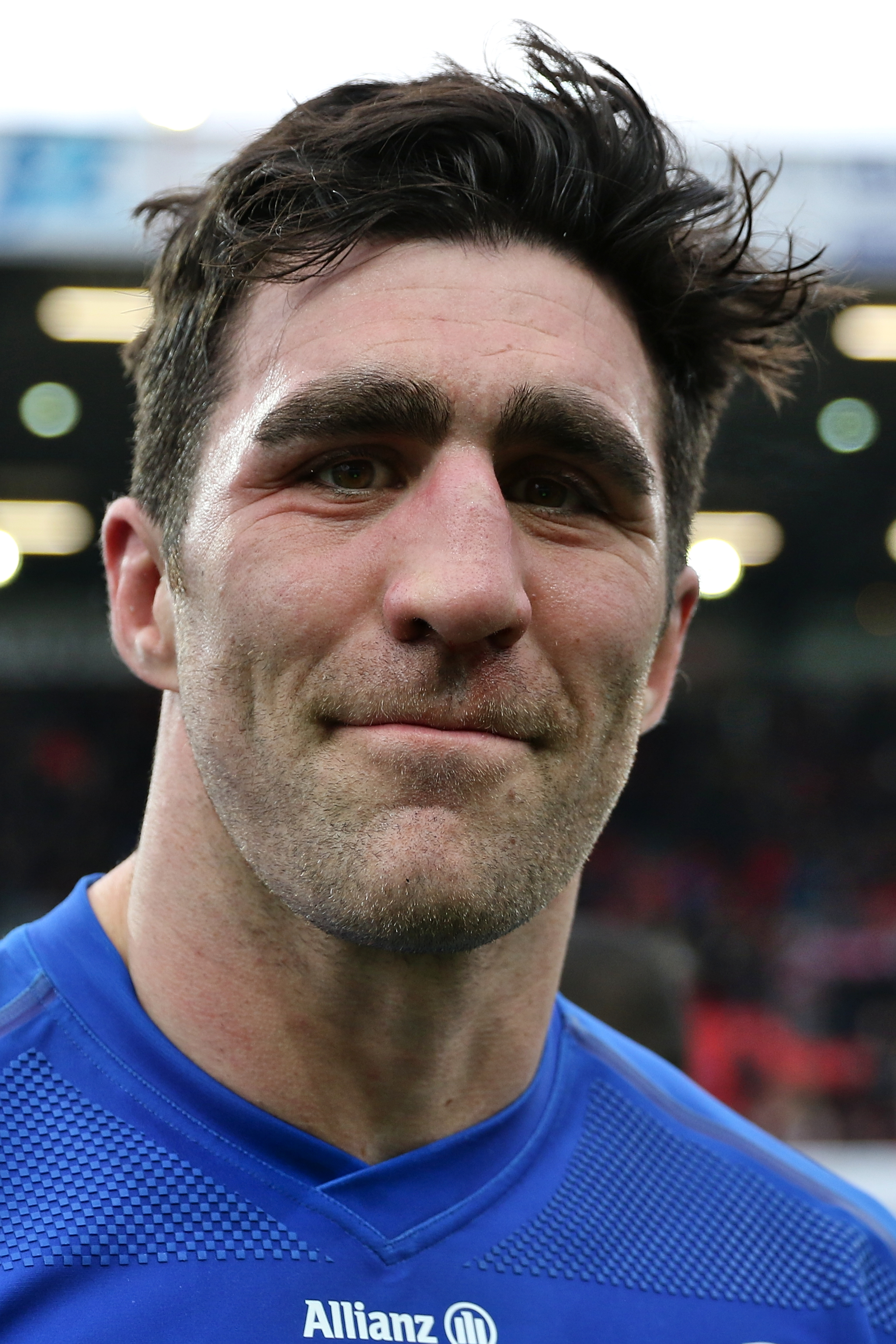
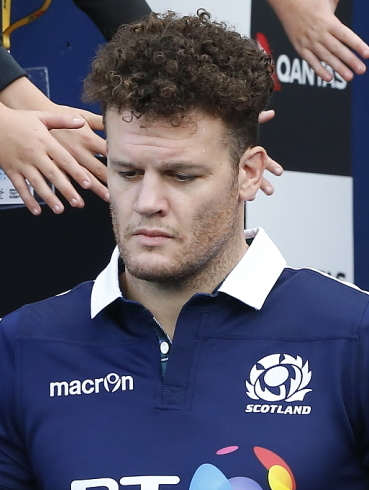
Left: Kelly Brown (Scotland) played for Saracens from 2010 to 2017.
Right: Duncan Taylor (Scotland) played for Saracens from 2012 to 2023.
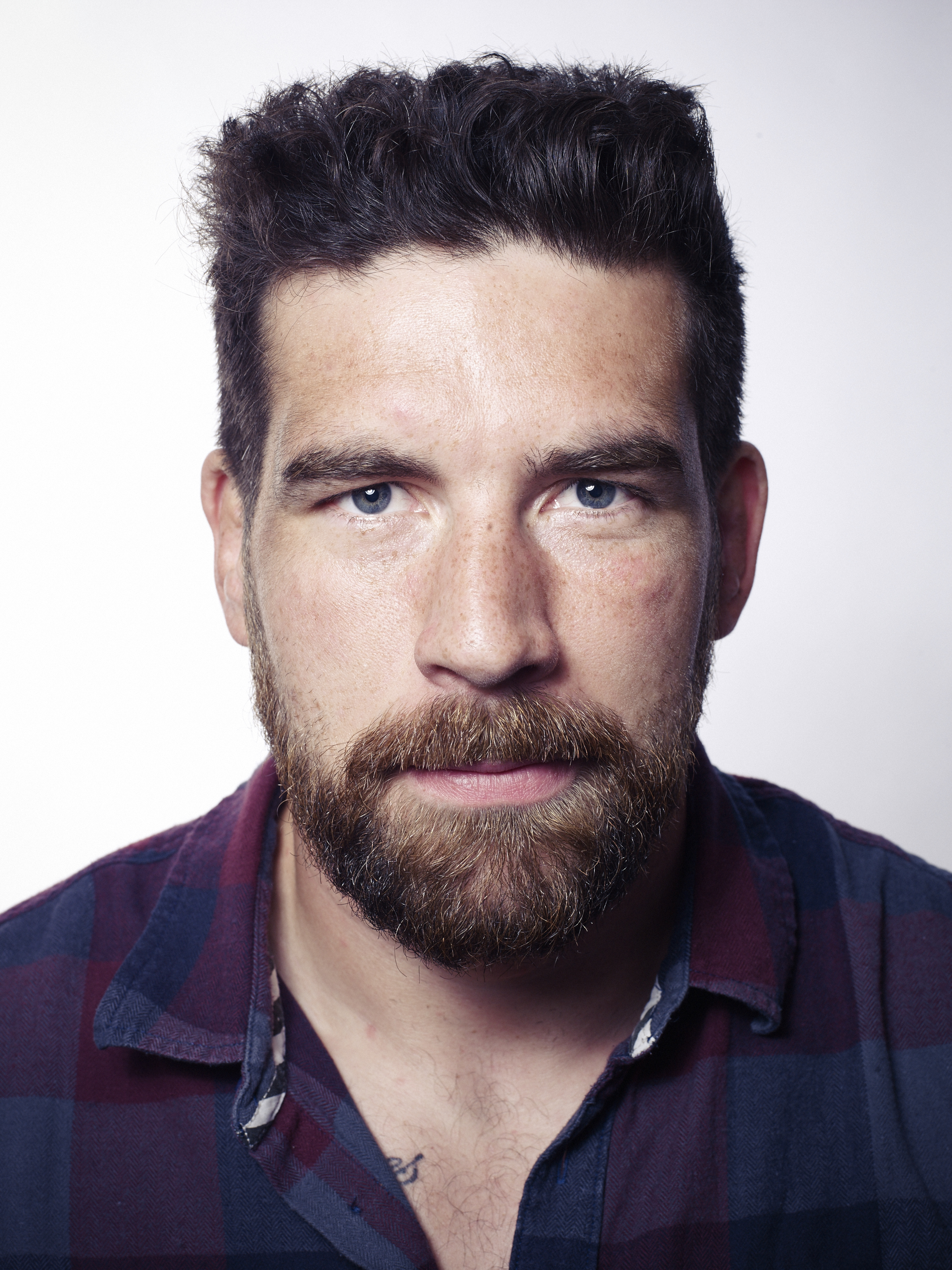
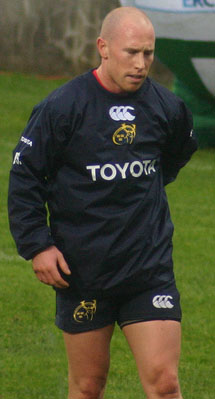
Left: Jim Hamilton (Scotland) played for Saracens from 2014 to 2017.
Right: Peter Stringer (Ireland) played for Saracens from 2011 to 2012.
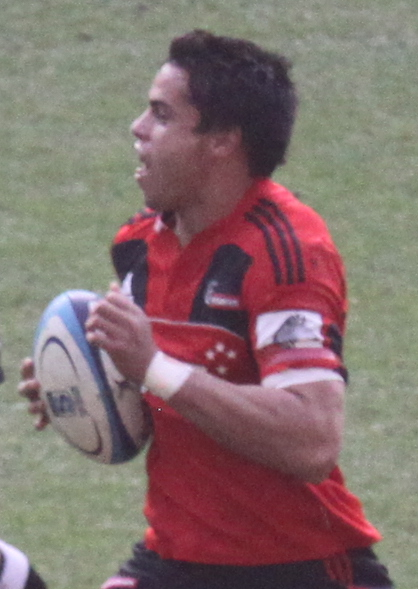
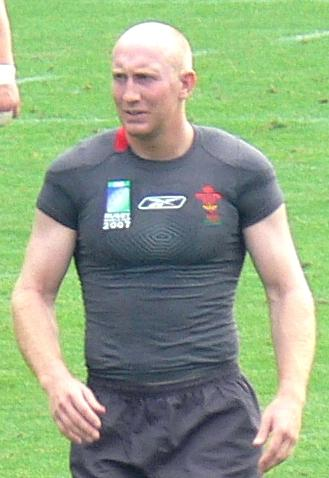
Left: Sean Maitland (Scotland, B&I Lions) played for Saracens from 2016 to 2024.
Right: Tom Shanklin (Wales, B&I Lions) played for Saracens from 2000 to 2003.

The following Saracens players, past and present, have represented Scotland, Wales or Ireland at senior international level:

- (Scotland) Kelly Brown
- (Scotland) **Fergus Burke**
- (Scotland) Blair Cowan
- (Scotland) Iain Fullarton
- (Scotland) Jim Hamilton
- (Scotland) Kieran Low
- (Scotland) Sean Maitland (Note: Sean Maitland earned three international caps for the New Zealand Māori in 2010, before switching his allegiance to Scotland in 2013.)
- (Scotland) Scott Murray
- (Scotland) **Andy Onyeama-Christie**
- (Scotland) Ali Price
- (Scotland) Gordon Ross
- (Scotland) Robbie Russell
- (Scotland) Tom Ryder
- (Scotland) Tim Swinson
- (Scotland) Duncan Taylor
- (Wales) Ben Broster
- (Wales) JB Bruzulier (7s)
- (Wales) **Rhys Carré**
- (Wales) Tony Copsey
- (Wales) Aled Davies
- (Wales) Dominic Day
- (Wales) Darren Edwards
- (Wales) Rhys Gill
- (Wales) Gavin Henson
- (Wales) Adam Jones
- (Wales) Michael Owen
- (Wales) Craig Quinnell
- (Wales) Tom Shanklin
- (Wales) **Nick Tompkins**
- (Wales) Paul Turner
- (Wales) Sam Wainwright
- (Wales) Liam Williams
- (Wales) **Tomos Williams**
- (Ireland) Shane Byrne
- (Ireland) Eddie Halvey
- (Ireland) Paddy Johns
- (Ireland) Darragh O'Mahony
- (Ireland) Peter Stringer
- (Ireland) Paul Wallace
- (Ireland) Richard Wallace

=== Captains ===
The following Saracens players, past and present, have held the captaincy for Scotland, Wales or Ireland at test level during their professional career.

- (Scotland) Kelly Brown
  - (2012–2014)
- (Scotland) Scott Murray
  - (2004)
- (Wales) Michael Owen
  - (2005–2006)
- (Ireland) Paddy Johns
  - (1998–1999)

=== British and Irish Lions ===
The following Scotland, Wales and Ireland internationals, who have played for Saracens during their professional career, have been called up to tour with the British and Irish Lions.

2 tours

- (Wales) Tom Shanklin
  - (2005, 2009)
- (Wales) Liam Williams
  - (2017, 2021)

1 tour

- (Scotland) Sean Maitland
  - (2013)
- (Scotland) Scott Murray
  - (2001)
- (Scotland) Ali Price
  - (2021)
- (Wales) Gavin Henson
  - (2005)
- (Wales) Michael Owen
  - (2005)
- (Ireland) Shane Byrne
  - (2005)
- (Ireland) Paul Wallace
  - (1997)
- (Ireland) Richard Wallace
  - (1993)
- (Wales) Tomos Williams
  - (2025)

== Northern Hemisphere ==
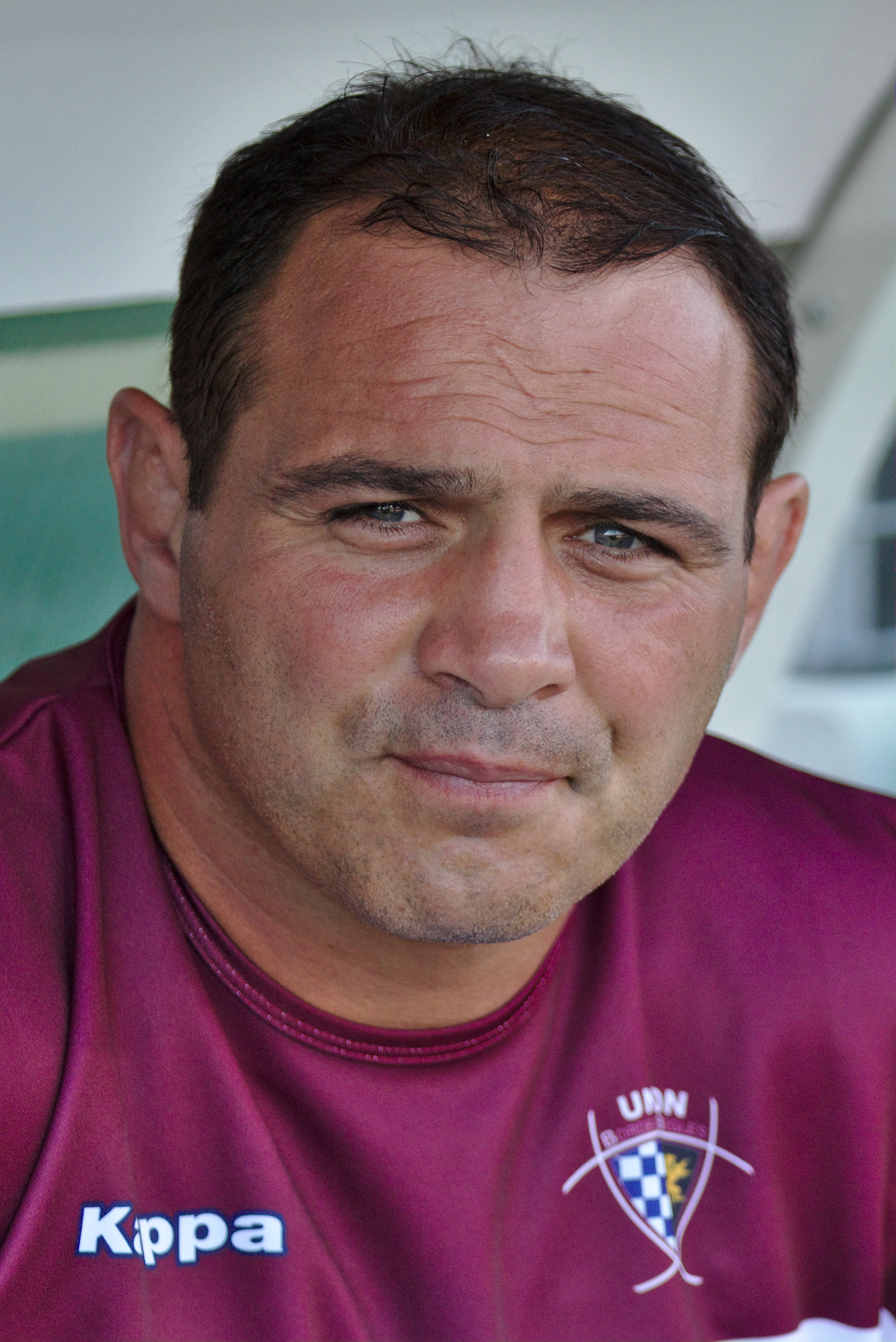
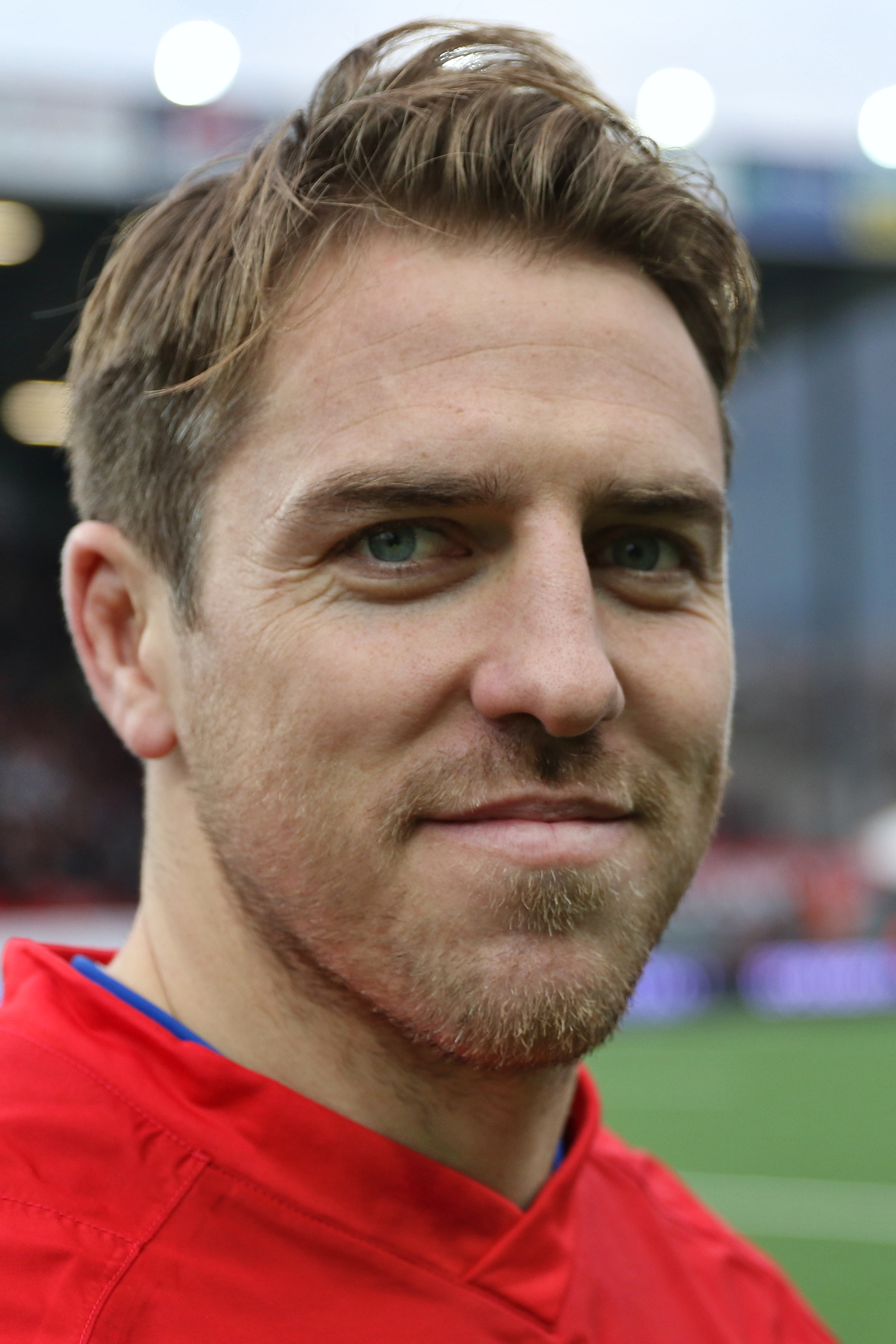
Left: Raphaël Ibañez (France) played for Saracens from 2003 to 2005.
Right: Chris Wyles (United States) played for Saracens from 2008 to 2018.

The following Saracens players, past and present, have represented a Northern Hemisphere nation at senior international level:

- (Canada) Kyle Baillie
- (Canada) Jared Barker
- (Canada) Courtney Smith
- (Canada) Richard Thorpe
- (Canada) Daniel van der Merwe
- (Canada) Morgan Williams
- (Cyprus) Tom Loizides
- (France) Abdelatif Benazzi (Note: Abdelatif Benazzi earned his first test caps for Morocco in 1990, before switching his allegiance to France later that year.)
- (France) Christian Califano
- (France) Thomas Castaignède
- (France) Raphaël Ibañez
- (France) Thierry Lacroix
- (France) Alain Penaud
- (France) Philippe Sella
- (France) Christopher Tolofua
- (Germany) Justin Melck
- (Germany) Adam Preocanin
- (Italy) Matías Agüero
- (Italy) Callum Braley
- (Italy) Matt Gallagher
- (Italy) Carlos Nieto
- (Italy) Fabio Ongaro
- (Italy) Marco Riccioni
- (Italy) Lorenzo Romano
- (Italy) Samuela Vunisa
- (Japan) Kensuke Iwabuchi
- (Japan) Takashi Kikutani
- (Romania) Cătălin Fercu
- (Romania) Tevita Manumua
- (Spain) Matthew Cook
- (United States) Ruben de Haas
- (United States) Will Hooley
- (United States) Thretton Palamo
- (United States) Faka'osi Pifeleti
- (United States) Kapeli Pifeleti
- (United States) Hayden Smith
- (United States) Phil Thiel
- (United States) Chris Wyles

== Southern Hemisphere ==
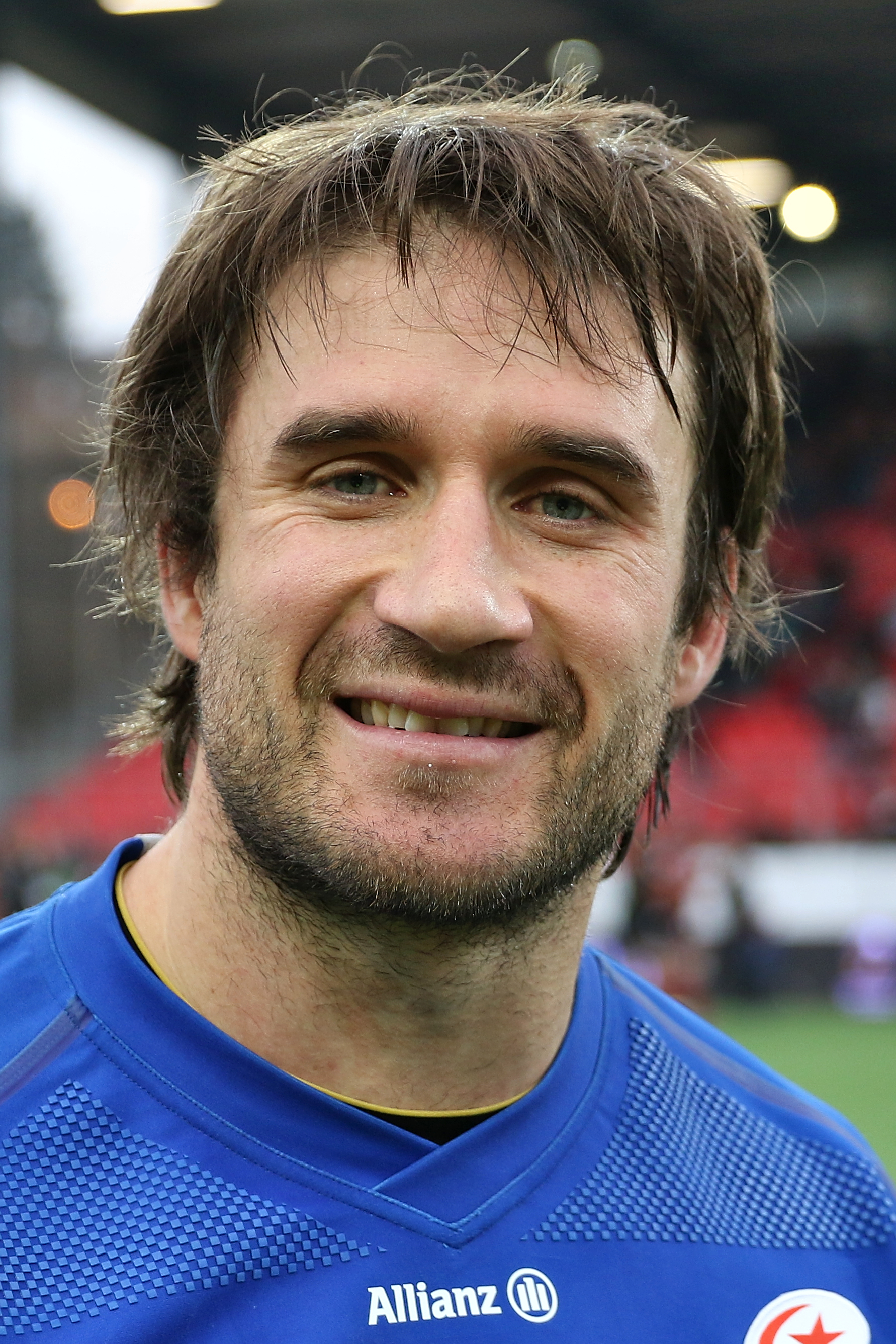
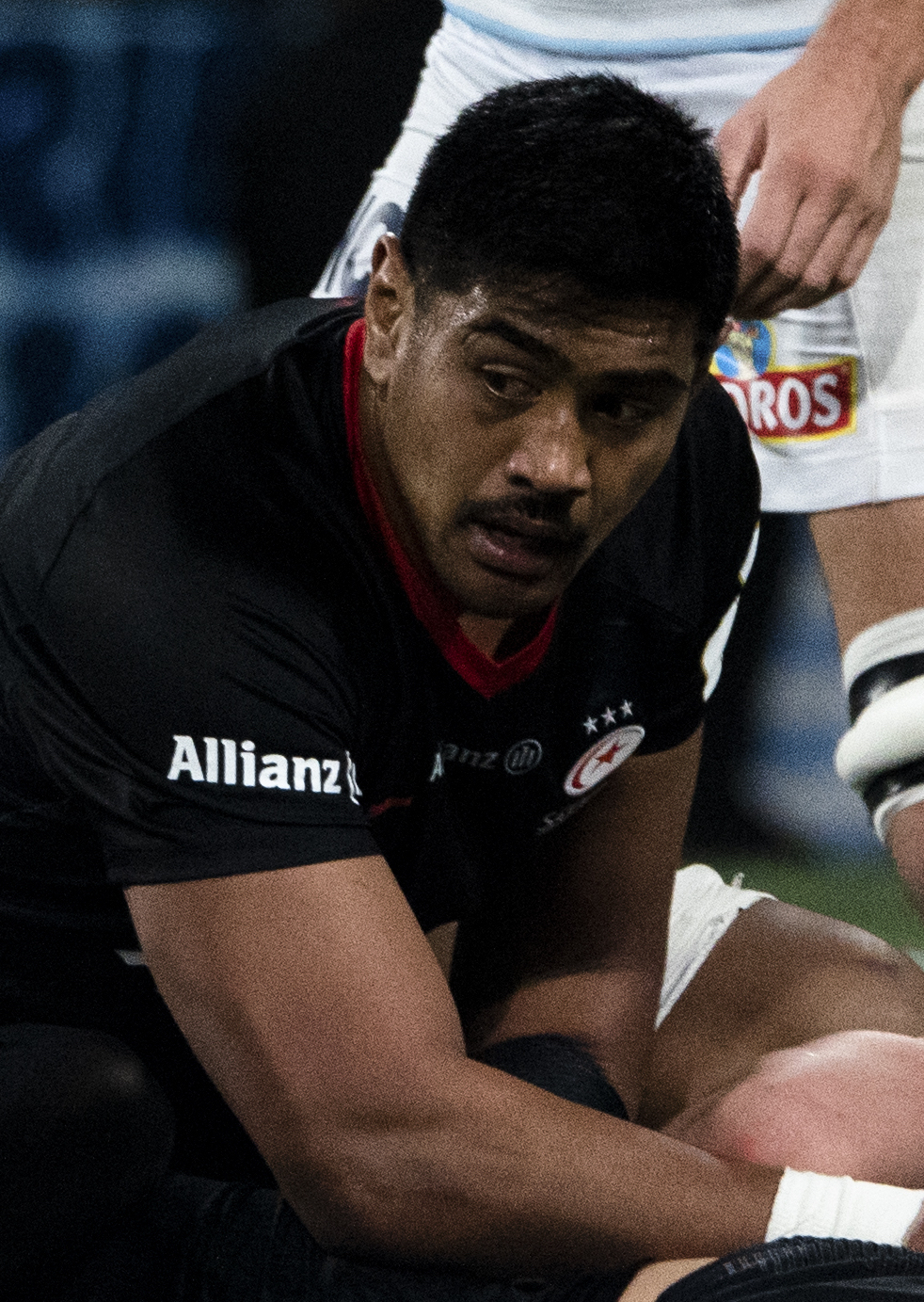
Left: Marcelo Bosch (Argentina) played for Saracens from 2013 to 2019.
Right: Will Skelton (Australia) played for Saracens from 2017 to 2020.
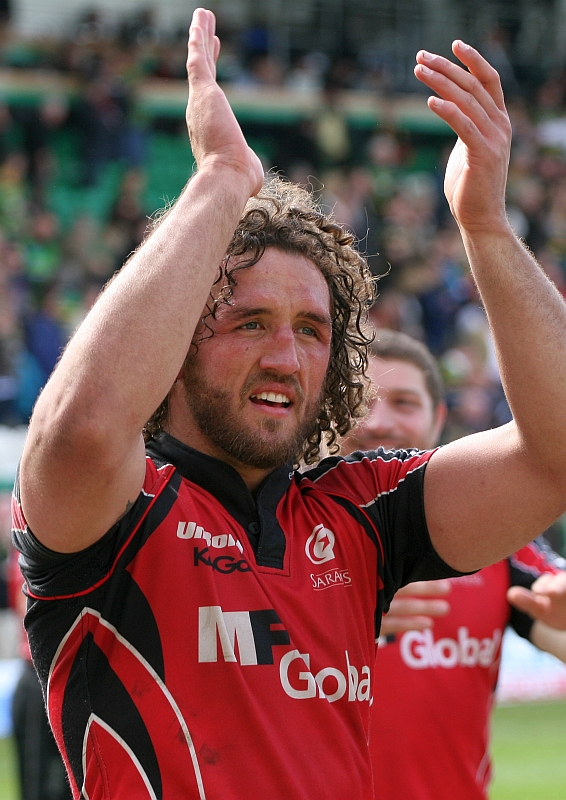
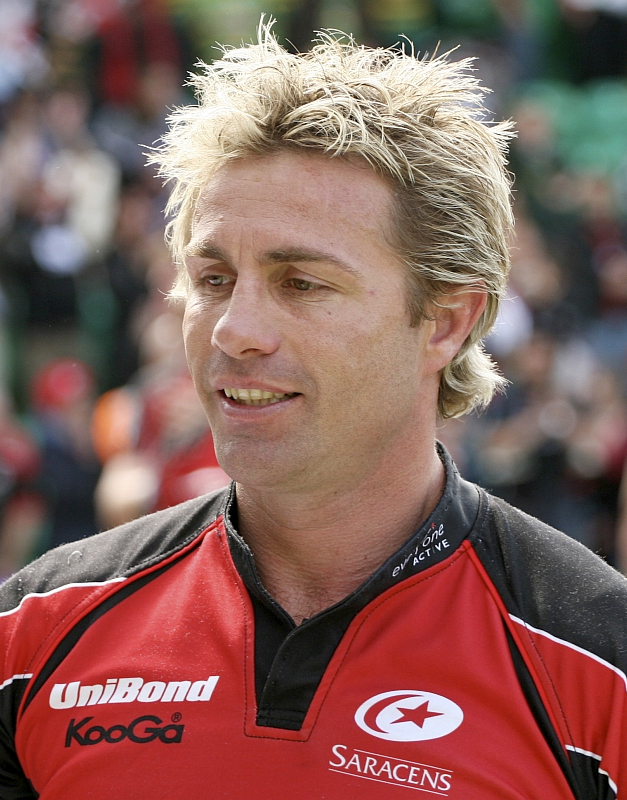
Left: Jacques Burger (Namibia) played for Saracens from 2010 to 2016.
Right: Justin Marshall (New Zealand) played for Saracens from 2009 to 2010.
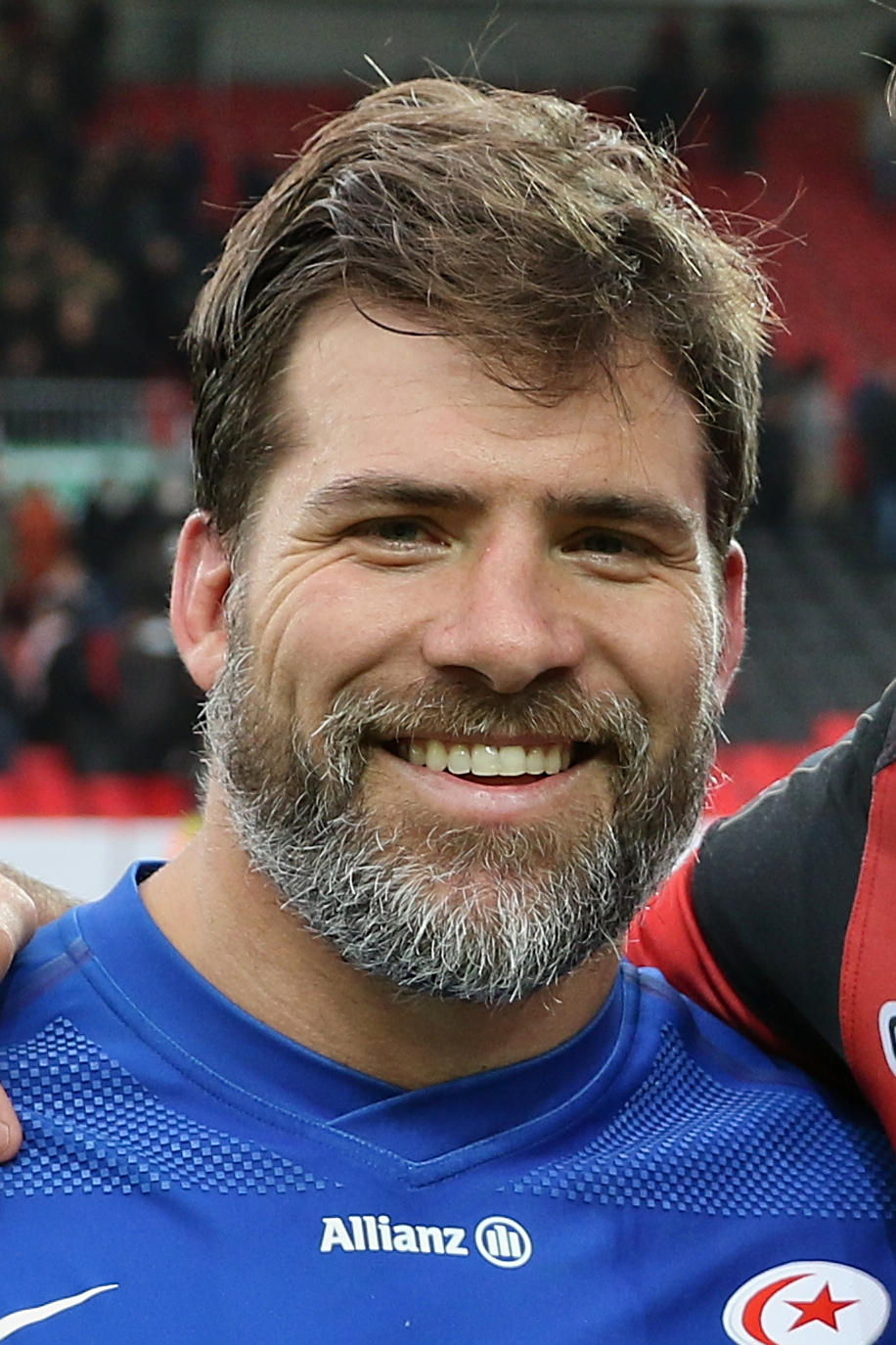
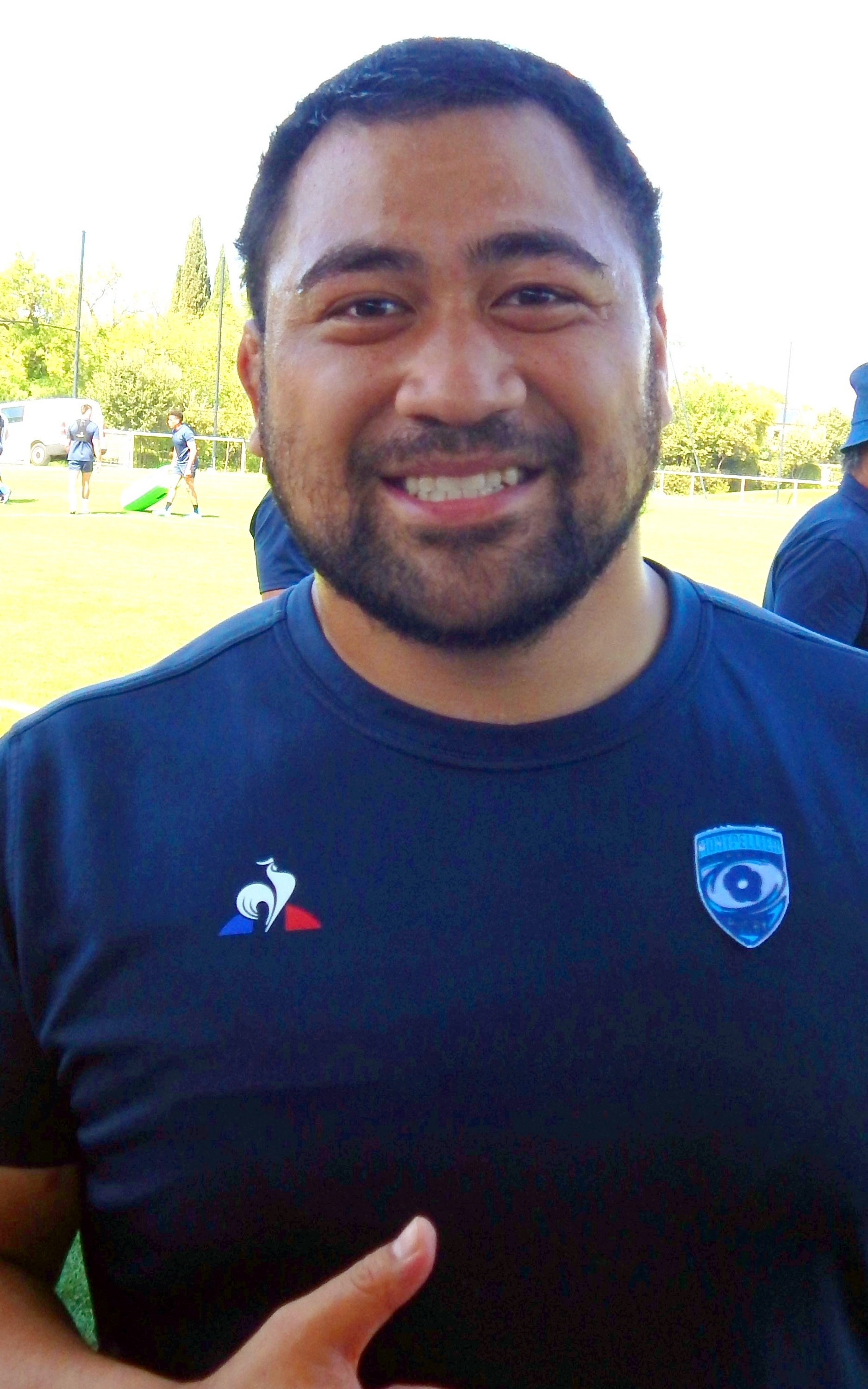
Left: Schalk Brits (South Africa) played for Saracens from 2009 to 2018.
Right: Titi Lamositele (USA, Samoa) played for Saracens from 2015 to 2020.
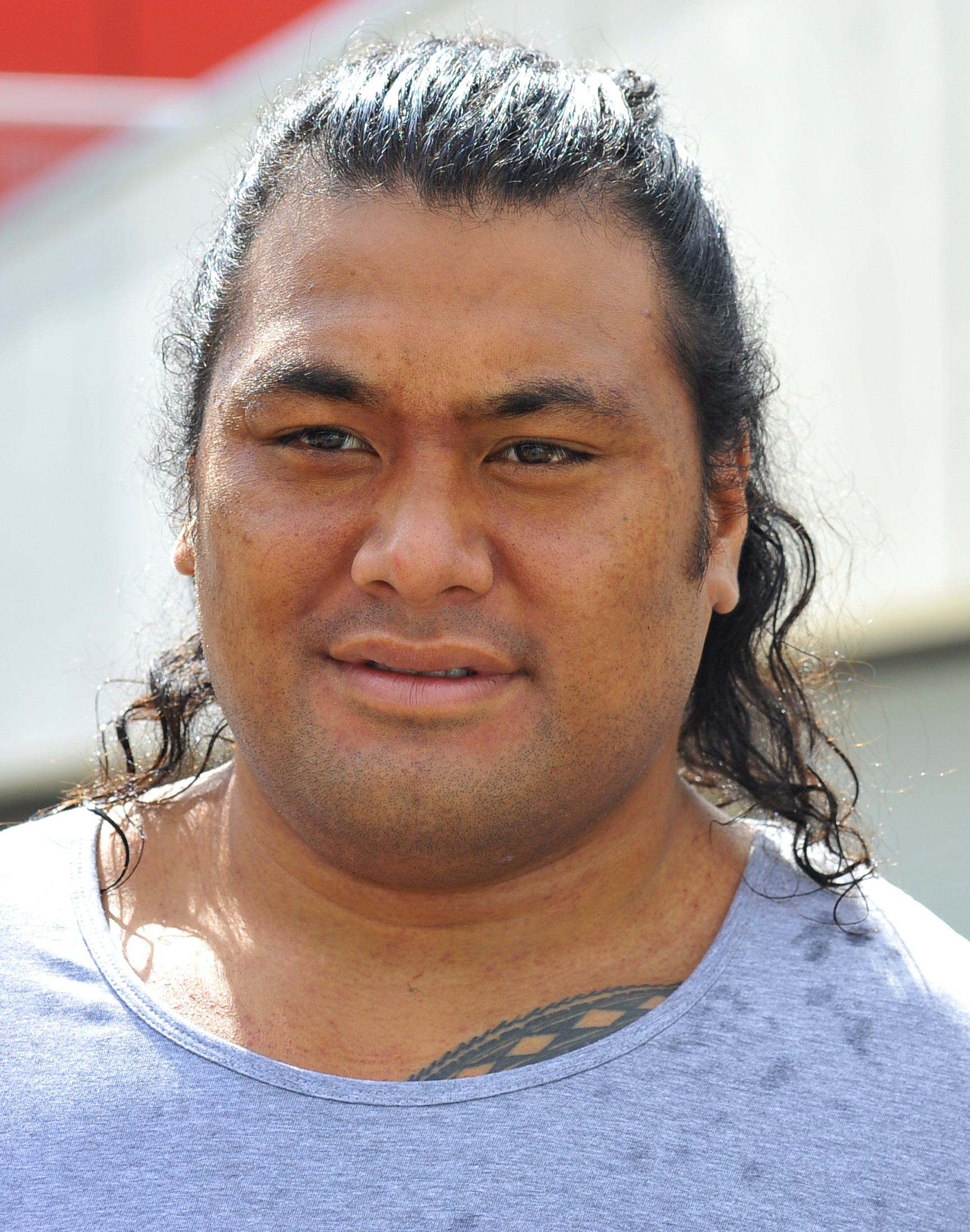
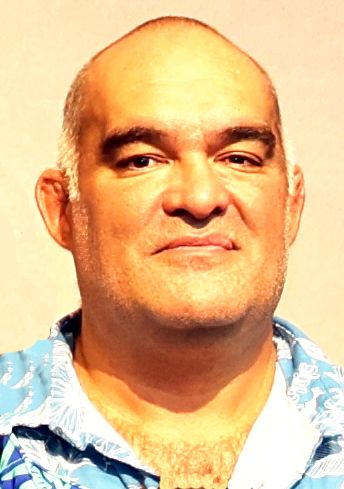
Left: Census Johnston (Samoa, Pacific Islanders) played for Saracens from 2006 to 2009.
Right: Simon Raiwalui (Fiji, Pacific Islanders) played for Saracens from 2003 to 2007.

The following Saracens players, past and present, have represented a Southern Hemisphere nation at senior international level:

- (Argentina) Eduardo Bello
- (Argentina) Emiliano Bergamaschi
- (Argentina) Marcelo Bosch
- (Argentina) **Lucio Cinti**
- (Argentina) Tomás de Vedia
- (Argentina) Juan Figallo
- (Argentina) **Juan Martín González**
- (Argentina) Roberto Grau
- (Argentina) Francisco Leonelli
- (Argentina) Christian Martin
- (Argentina) Juan Pablo Socino (Note: Juan Pablo Socino was also capped by the South American Jaguars in 2013.)
- (Australia) Jermaine Ainsley
- (Australia) Mark Bartholomeusz
- (Australia) Troy Coker
- (Australia) Ryan Constable
- (Australia) Tony Daly
- (Australia) Huia Edmonds
- (Australia) Tim Horan
- (Australia) Ollie Hoskins
- (Australia) Rod Kafer
- (Australia) Barry Lea (7s)
- (Australia) Michael Lynagh
- (Australia) Patrick Phibbs
- (Australia) Dave Porecki
- (Australia) Will Skelton
- (Cook Islands) Johnny Marsters
- (Fiji) Sam Domoni
- (Fiji) Nemia Kenatale
- (Fiji) Nicky Little
- (Fiji) Sakiusa Matadigo
- (Fiji) **Eroni Mawi**
- (Fiji) **Vilikesa Nairau**
- (Fiji) Simon Raiwalui
- (Fiji) Kameli Ratuvou
- (Fiji) Mosese Rauluni
- (Fiji) Savenaca Rawaca
- (Fiji) Michael Tagicakibau
- (Fiji) Mitieli Vulikijapani (RL)
- (Ivory Coast) Emmanuel Amapakabo
- (Morocco) Khalid Benazzi
- (Namibia) Jacques Burger
- (Namibia) Janco Venter
- (New Zealand) Brendon Daniel (7s)
- (New Zealand) Chris Jack
- (New Zealand) Glen Jackson (M)
- (New Zealand) Joe Maddock (M)
- (New Zealand) Justin Marshall
- (New Zealand) Taine Randell
- (Samoa) Census Johnston
- (Samoa) James Johnston
- (Samoa) Titi Lamositele (Note: Titi Lamositele represented the United States at test level between 2013 and 2019, before switching his allegiance to Samoa in 2023.)
- (Samoa) Kas Lealamanua
- (Samoa) Fa'atiga Lemalu
- (Samoa) Theo McFarland
- (Samoa) Izaiha Moore-Aiono
- (Samoa) Logovi'i Mulipola
- (Samoa) Brendan Reidy
- (Samoa) Hisa Sasagi
- (Samoa) Michael Stanley
- (Samoa) Pelu Taele
- (Samoa) **Tietie Tuimauga**
- (South Africa) Schalk Brits
- (South Africa) Schalk Burger
- (South Africa) Deon Carstens
- (South Africa) Jannie de Beer
- (South Africa) Neil de Kock
- (South Africa) Alistair Hargreaves
- (South Africa) Derick Hougaard
- (South Africa) Francois Hougaard
- (South Africa) Gavin Johnson
- (South Africa) Vincent Koch
- (South Africa) Francois Pienaar
- (South Africa) Brent Russell
- (South Africa) John Smit
- (South Africa) Wikus van Heerden
- (South Africa) Ivan van Zyl
- (South Africa) Cobus Visagie
- (South Africa) Damian Willemse
- (Tonga) Pila Fifita
- (Tonga) Viliami Hakalo
- (Tonga) Tevita Vaikona
- (Tonga) Sione Vailanu

=== World Champions ===
The following Saracens alumni have won the Rugby World Cup with their respective nations during their test career.

2 titles

- (Australia) Tim Horan
  - (1991, 1999)
- (South Africa) Vincent Koch
  - (2019, 2023)
- (South Africa) Damian Willemse
  - (2019, 2023)

1 title

- (Australia) Troy Coker
  - (1991)
- (Australia) Tony Daly
  - (1991)
- (Australia) Rod Kafer
  - (1999)
- (Australia) Michael Lynagh
  - (1991)
- (South Africa) Schalk Brits
  - (2019)
- (South Africa) Schalk Burger
  - (2007)
- (South Africa) Gavin Johnson
  - (1995)
- (South Africa) Francois Pienaar
  - (1995)
- (South Africa) John Smit
  - (2007)
- (South Africa) Wikus van Heerden
  - (2007)

=== Pacific Islanders ===
The following Fiji, Samoa and Tonga internationals, who have played for Saracens during their professional career, have been called up to tour with the Pacific Islanders.

3 tours

- (Fiji) Mosese Rauluni
  - (2004, 2006, 2008)

2 tours

- (Samoa) Census Johnston
  - (2006, 2008)
- (Fiji) Kameli Ratuvou
  - (2006, 2008)

1 tour

- (Samoa) Kas Lealamanua
  - (2008)
- (Fiji) Simon Raiwalui
  - (2006)

== See also ==
- Saracens F.C.
- List of Saracens F.C. records and statistics
