= Mighty Minnows =

The Mighty Minnows are an invitational rugby sevens team founded in 2007, with players selected to play various levels of rugby.

Their debut was at the Caldy Sevens in 2007 where they lost to the Sale Sharks in the final 28–31. In 2008 they were championship winners, defeating Wharfedale in the final.

The Mighty Minnows and have entered Bournemouth Sevens where their competitors include Seru Rabeni, Jamie Noon, Ross Fennell and Andrew Farrell.
