= Sitiveni Sivivatu =

New Zealand rugby player (born 1982)

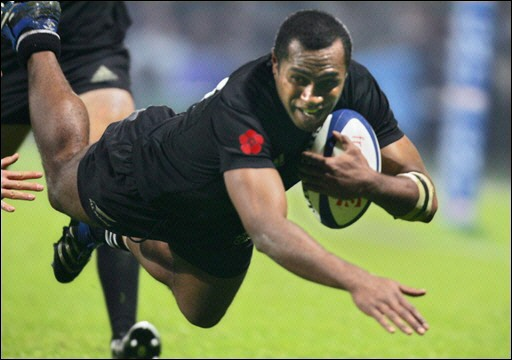
- Sivivatu during a match for New Zealand, November 2006
- Full name: Sitiveni Waica Sivivatu
- Born: 19 April 1982 (age 44) Suva, Fiji
- Height: 185 cm (6 ft 1 in)
- Weight: 95 kg (209 lb; 14 st 13 lb)
- School: Ratu Kadavulevu School; Wesley College, Auckland

Rugby union career
- Position: Wing
Senior career
Years	Team	Apps	(Points)
2001–2003	Counties Manukau	20	(120)
2003–2011	Chiefs	89	(210)
2004–2011	Waikato	30	(95)
2011–2014	Clermont	69	(110)
2014–2016	Castres	29	(35)
- Correct as of 29 May 2020
International career
Years	Team	Apps	(Points)
2004	Pacific Islanders	3	(20)
2005–2011	New Zealand	46	(145)
- Correct as of 29 May 2020

Sitiveni Waica Sivivatu (born 19 April 1982) is a Fijian-born New Zealand former rugby union footballer who played as a wing. He was largely successful in the 2005 Super 12 season playing for the Chiefs. He acquired a starting position in the All Blacks, and scored 29 tries in 45 tests.

He also scored 4 tries for the Pacific Islanders in 2004 – 2 against the All Blacks, and 2 against South Africa. Since the Pacific Islanders team has been sanctioned by the IRB, his 4 tries for them stands.

== Early life ==
Sivivatu attended Ratu Kadavulevu School in Fiji before moving to New Zealand when he was 15. He attended Wesley College, the school that produced All Blacks great Jonah Lomu. He first played in the National Provincial Championship with second division side Counties Manukau, eventually moving to the first division with Waikato. He was the only 2nd division player in NZ to win a Super Rugby contract. He regards as his hero Philippe Sella because "he could just do anything on the field of play. If he decided to drop he could do it from anywhere within his range, and he was an amazing player with ball in hand."

== Pacific Islanders ==
Sivivatu played for the inaugural Pacific Islanders rugby union team against the Australian Wallabies in 2004. Among his teammates were Sione Lauaki who also became an All Black. Sivivatu and fellow All Black wing Joe Rokocoko regard themselves as "cousins" as Sivivatu lived with the Rokocoko family.

== All Blacks ==
He was first named in a trials squad for All Black selection in 2004. He made his Test debut against Fiji and broke the All Blacks record by scoring four tries. Sivivatu was selected for the All Blacks in 2005 and started in all three of the All Blacks Tests against the British & Irish Lions on their 2005 tour of New Zealand, scoring tries in the first two Tests.

== Move to France ==
In March 2011, he signed a two-year deal with French rugby giants, ASM Clermont Auvergne. He was signed as a replacement for Fijian flyer Napolioni Nalaga, who returned to Fiji due to personal problems. He was not included in the New Zealand squad for the 2011 Rugby World Cup.

In June 2016, Sivivatu retired as a player for Castres and joined the staff as a technical adviser and help integrate foreign players.

== Controversy ==
On 11 April 2007 Sivivatu pleaded guilty to slapping his wife in March 2007. He was discharged without conviction and ordered to pay a fine. On leaving court Sivivatu said "I'm clearly sorry about what I did".
