= Filipo Levi =

Samoa international rugby union player

- Born: 6 September 1979 (age 47) Huntly, New Zealand
- Height: 1.96 m (6 ft 5 in)
- Weight: 120 kg (260 lb)
- School: Logan Park High School; Otago Boys' High School
- University: Otago University BA Pacific Studies and Masters Degree Indigenous studies

Rugby union career
- Position(s): Lock, Back row
Senior career
Years	Team	Apps	(Points)
2007–2009	Ricoh Black Rams		
2009	Ospreys		
2009–2011	Newcastle Falcons	45	(0)
2011-2012	Nottingham	8	(0)
Provincial / State sides
Years	Team	Apps	(Points)
2000-2006	Otago	70	(0)
2011-2012	Tasman	13	(0)
Super Rugby
Years	Team	Apps	(Points)
2002–07	Highlanders	63	
International career
Years	Team	Apps	(Points)
2007-2011	Samoa	25	(0)
2004-2008	Pacific Islanders	5	(0)

Filipo Levi is the former International Rugby Captain for Manu Samoa and captained teams from a local and international stage from 2000 to 2013.

In 2011 Filipo was bestowed with the ancient Samoan chief Tulafale-orator speaking title of Mulitalo from the village of Lano in Savai'i Samoa. The Samoan chief system is over 3000 years and a Tulafale chief title is one to lead by serving the people.

In 2018, Filipo Founded the RUBC Rugby Union Business Club. RUBC is a social initiative in supporting Rugby players in their transitioning and starting their businesses and careers. RUBC is a metaphor of surrounding a Rugby player with mentors, business coaches, financial advisors and entrepreneurs to plan to succeed in life after sport. When the spotlight fades, RUBC is filling this gap to continue the team in life after Rugby.

Filipo attained his masters and bachelor's degree from the University of Otago while playing professional Rugby.

== Career ==
International

Levi was part of the Samoa squad at the 2007 Rugby World Cup, but a severe eye socket injury forced him out of the tournament. Levi was a member of the Samoa squad at the 2011 Rugby World Cup. In 2008 Levi took over the Manu Samoa captaincy after long time captain Semo Sititi focused on playing and all but retired from International duties. In 2011 Levi again Captained Manu Samoa against Ikale Tahi Tonga in Fiji before playing the Wallabies Australian Rugby team where Manu Samoa were victorious in Sydney.

New Zealand

Levi grew up in Glen Innes Auckland before moving to Dunedin where his Father Reverend Fogatia Lavea Levi was accepted into University of Otago Knox Theological Studies. He attended Logan Park High School before joining Otago Boys' High School where they were the first team from the South Island to have won the national 1st XV competition in 1998, playing alongside future All Black Captain Richie McCaw.

Levi was then selected for the New Zealand Colts that won the 2000 U21 World Cup in New Zealand playing alongside the likes of Carl Hayman, Keven Mealamu, Mils Muliaina, Seilala Mapusua, Aaron Mauger, Gavin Williams, Clarke Dermody, Ben Blair, Rodney Sooialo, Jerry Collins and Richie McCaw

Levi played for the local Dunedin club Alhambra Union from 1999-2007 and for Otago Rugby 2000-2006. Levi signed for Super 12 side the Highlanders in 2002 and went on to become one of their most capped players leaving in 2007. Levi played his final club games for Auckland Marist Tamaki in 2012-2013.

In 2016 Filipo Coached Auckland Marist Tamaki and finished in 2018 and is involved with College Rifles Rugby since 2019-2020.

UK

In February 2009 the Ospreys signed him from Japanese side Ricoh Black Rams. At the end of the 2008–09 Magners League he signed for Premiership side Newcastle Falcons as primarily a back row player. In November 2011 Nottingham signed him from Newcastle Falcons until the end of the 2011–12 RFU Championship.
