= Jacob Rauluni =

Fiji international rugby union player (born 1972)

- Born: Jacob Sekove Rauluni; 25 June 1972 (age 54) Suva, Fiji
- Height: 1.78 m (5 ft 10 in)
- Weight: 88 kg (13 st 12 lb; 194 lb)
- School: Brisbane State High School
- Notable relative(s): Taito Rauluni (father); Mosese Rauluni (brother); Waisale Serevi (uncle)

Rugby union career
- Position: Scrum-half
Senior career
Years	Team	Apps	(Points)
2002–05	Rotherham		
2005–06	Bristol	13	(10)
2006–07	Leeds	21	(5)
Super Rugby
Years	Team	Apps	(Points)
1996–02	Reds	55	(20)
International career
Years	Team	Apps	(Points)
1995–06	Fiji	52	(30)

Jacob Rauluni (born 25 June 1972) is a former International Rugby Union player who comes from a family of international halfbacks. His father, Taito, played halfback for Fiji, as did his brother Mosese and his first cousin Waisale Serevi, who also started his career at halfback. Rauluni played for the Queensland Reds from 1995 to 2002 and he played for Fiji from 1995 to 2006. He had an extended spell playing rugby in the UK, and is best known for helping Rotherham Titans win promotion to the Premiership. In 2006 he played three tests for The Barbarians. He retired from international rugby in 2007, having played 52 tests. He played his last test against Japan as Captain of the Fiji national team.

== Test career ==
Rauluni has been capped 52 times by his country including Captaining them in the 2003 season. He has played in three World Cups in 1995, 1999 and 2003.

Rauluni had a very good combination with Fijian first five eighth Nicky Little throughout his career.

Rauluni's first test was against South Africa and he played his first Telecom Fiji Cup game in July 2000, turning out alongside Marika Vunibaka to help Suva defeat Tailevu.

== Club career ==
Rauluni grew up in Brisbane and played for Easts Rugby Union from the age of eight. He played for Australian Schoolboys and Australian Under 19s and Under 21s before choosing to play for Fiji. At school he used to play flanker, but the Aussie Schoolboys team needed a halfback for the tour of the UK in 1991, and Rauluni says he was handed the No. 9 jersey because of his family's tradition.

Rauluni played for Queensland from 1995 to 2002 and played over 55 Super 12 games. He was part of 2000 and 2002 semifinals. Rauluni chose to play for Fiji like his father Taito.

Rauluni kept the starting spot in the Fiji team for over a decade, and also played for the Queensland Reds in Super 12 from 1995 to 2002, playing in the semi-finals in 2000 and 2002. Leeds Tykes signed Rauluni on a one-year contract from Guinness Premiership side Bristol ahead of the 2006–07 season. An experienced scrum half at the time, Rauluni played a role in helping the club achieve promotion. He made his debut in the third game of the season, away against Pertemps Bees. He spent three successful seasons playing for Rotherham, making 51 appearances for Rotherham between 2002 and 2005. He was a key member of the promotion winning side and featured in their Premiership campaign in 2003-04.

Rauluni played rugby for the Capella Cattledogs and in 2009 played for Queensland Country. He debuted for the Capricorn Coast Crocs in 2014. Jacob was instrumental in the early success of the crocs in the Rockhampton and districts A grade competition. Jacob unfortunately succumbed to an injury which ended his session. He now plays for the Cap Coast Crocs Rugby Club and coaches Junior Rugby.
