= Seilala Mapusua =

Samoa international rugby union player

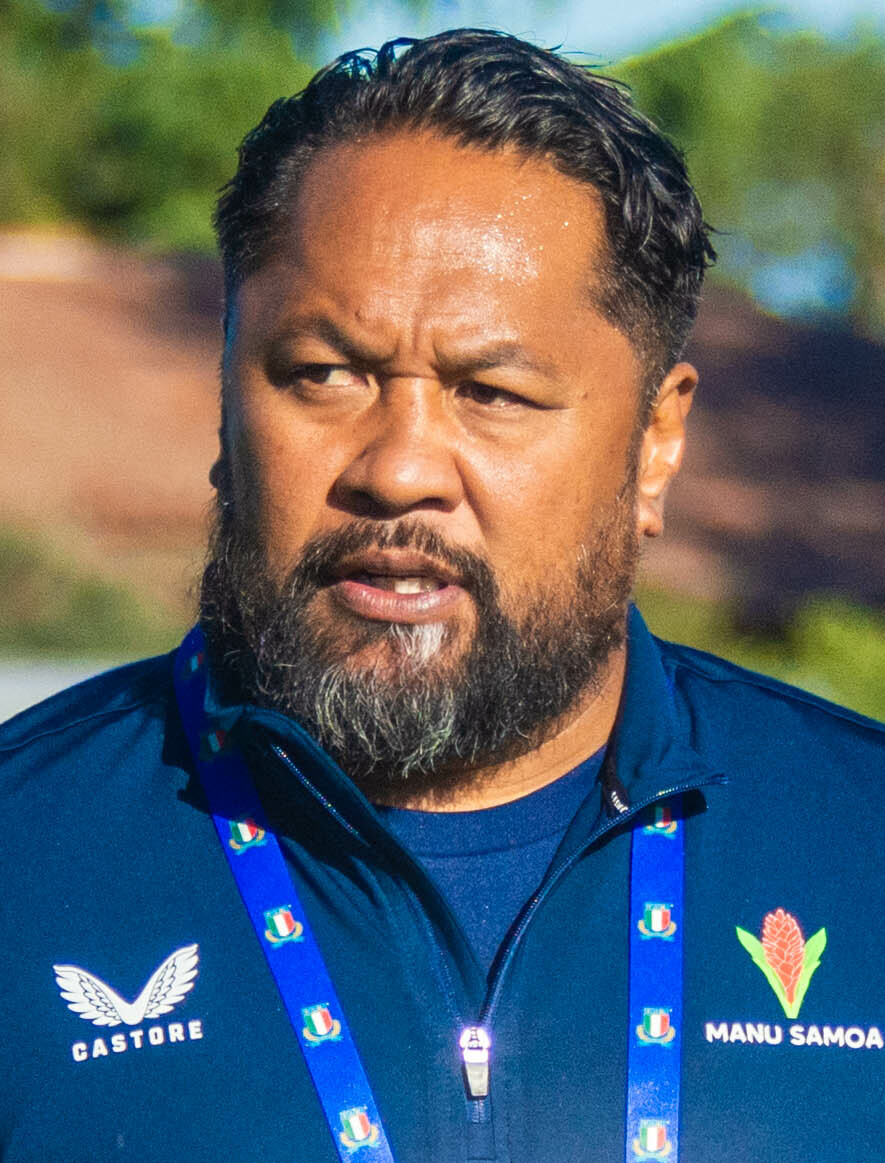
- Born: Seilala J. Mapusua; 27 February 1980 (age 46) Moto’otua, Samoa
- Height: 180 cm (5 ft 11 in)
- Weight: 106 kg (16 st 10 lb; 234 lb)
- School: Wesley College

Rugby union career
- Position(s): inside centre, scrumhalf
Senior career
| Years | Team | Apps | (Points) |
| 1998 | Counties Manukau | 1 | |
| 2000–2006 | Otago | 68 | (60) |
| 2006–2011 | London Irish | 126 | (105) |
| 2011–2014 | Kubota Spears | 31 | (60) |
| 2014–2016 | Kamaishi Seawaves | 25 | (5) |
Super Rugby
| Years | Team | Apps | (Points) |
| 2002–2006 | Highlanders | 51 | (25) |
International career
| Years | Team | Apps | (Points) |
| 2004–2008 | Pacific Islanders | 7 | (5) |
| 2006–2013 | Samoa | 26 | (5) |

Vaovasamanaia Seilala Mapusua (born 27 February 1980) is a retired Samoan rugby player who last played for the Kubota Spears of the Japanese Top League. Prior to his move to Japan in 2011, he also had long stints with the Highlanders in Super Rugby and London Irish in the Aviva Premiership. He is currently the head coach of Manu Samoa having been appointed in 2020.

== Playing career ==
=== New Zealand ===
Mapusua was born in Moto’otua, Samoa, but grew up in Wellington, New Zealand and attended school at Wesley College in Auckland moving south to join Otago for the 2000 provincial season. His strong performances for Otago saw him earn a contract with the Highlanders for the 2002 Super 12 season and he remained a fixture for both Otago and the Highlanders through 2006. By the time he left New Zealand he was only the fifth back to have played more than 50 games for the Highlanders.

=== England ===
Mapusua joined London Irish for the 2006–07 Guinness Premiership, and immediately established himself as a top player for the side, scoring 4 tries in 22 matches. He was named the team's top newcomer for his efforts.

In 2008–09, he would have a towering season for London Irish, scoring 9 tries in 27 matches in all competitions and leading the club to the Premiership final. At the conclusion of the season he was named the PRA Players' Player of the Season.

He continued as a regular starter through 2011, and by the conclusion of his stay in London had played 125 games with the side including 91 Premiership matches and 23 Heineken Cup contests.

=== Japan ===
In January 2011, Mapusua announced that he was signing in Japan with the Kubota Spears for the 2011–12 season.

=== International Play ===
Mapusua made his debut for Samoa against Japan on 17 June 2006 and represented Samoa in the 2007 Rugby World Cup. He captained the squad for the 2011 Rugby World Cup. He has also been selected to the touring Pacific Islanders.

== Coaching ==
Mapusua retired from rugby in 2016. After returning to New Zealand he worked as a Coaching Development Officer for Otago Rugby.

In August 2020 Mapusua was appointed coach of Manu Samoa.

In December 2020 he was granted the Faʻamatai title of Vaovasamanaia.

Sporting positions
| Preceded by (New Zealand) Steve Jackson | Samoa National Rugby Union Coach; 2020–2023 | Succeeded by (Samoa) Mahonri Schwalger |
