= Taufaʻao Filise =

Tongan rugby union footballer

Taufa'ao Filise
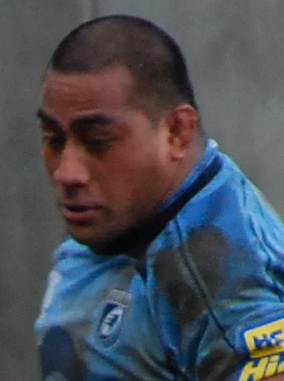
- Born: Taufa'ao Filise; 26 May 1977 (age 49) Malapo, Tonga
- Height: 1.88 m (6 ft 2 in)
- Weight: 124 kg (19 st 7 lb)

Rugby union career
- Position: Prop
Senior career
Years	Team	Apps	(Points)
2005	Bath Rugby	2	(0)
2005–2018	Cardiff Blues	255	(45)
Super Rugby
Years	Team	Apps	(Points)
2003	Chiefs	0	(0)
2005	Blues	4	(0)
International career
Years	Team	Apps	(Points)
2001–2011	Tonga	17	(5)
2004–2006	Pacific Islanders	5	(0)

Taufa'ao Filise (born 26 May 1977) is a Tongan former rugby union footballer who played over 250 games for the Cardiff Blues.

Filise was born in Malapo near Nuku’alofa. and attended Tupou College. He started his professional rugby career in 2000 with Bay of Plenty in the National Provincial Championship. He was selected the following year for Tonga, and would go on to represent Tonga 17 times, including playing at the 2007 and 2011 Rugby World Cups. Filise would also represent the Pacific Islanders rugby union team in 2004 and 2006.

He was picked up by the Blues (Super Rugby) for their 2005 Super Rugby campaign, and then signed for Bath Rugby on a year contract following that. After his season with Bath, Filise moved to Cardiff Blues for their 2006-2007 Celtic League campaign. He was part of the Cardiff teams that won the 2008–09 Anglo-Welsh Cup and the 2009–10 European Challenge Cup. On 19 December 2015 he became the Cardiff Blues most capped player with 183 first class appearances. He made his 250th appearance for the club on 31 December 2017.

Filise finished his career playing for the Cardiff Blues in the Pro14. During his 13 years in Cardiff, Filise amassed 255 appearances, with 9 tries and became a cult figure earning the nickname "The king of Tonga". His final game for the club was the European Rugby Challenge Cup final in Bilbao, which Cardiff won 31-30.
