= Justin Va'a =

- Born: 26 July 1978 (age 48) Golden Bay Sands, New Zealand
- Height: 6 ft 0 in (1.83 m)
- Weight: 20 st 2 lb (128 kg)
- Occupation: Rugby player

Rugby union career
- Position: Prop
Senior career
Years	Team	Apps	(Points)
- Glasgow Warriors
International career
Years	Team	Apps	(Points)
2005-2009	Samoa	18	(5)
2006-2008	Pacific Islanders	5	(5)

Justin Va'a (born on 26 July 1978 Wainuiomata, New Zealand) is a former prop for the Samoan national rugby team and the Scottish club Glasgow Warriors in the Celtic League.

He has earned 9 caps for Samoa. He was a member of the Pacific Islanders rugby union team for the 2006 tour of Europe.

In 2012 he played his 100th game for Wainuiomata.
