= Tevita Taumoepeau =

Tongan rugby union player (born 1974)

- Born: 16 May 1974 (age 52) Ha'apai, Tonga
- Height: 1.80 m (5 ft 11 in)
- Weight: 118 kg (18 st 8 lb)

Rugby union career
- Position: Tighthead prop
Amateur team(s)
Years	Team	Apps	(Points)
2000-2001	Ngongotaha		
2001-2003	East Coast Bays		
Senior career
Years	Team	Apps	(Points)
2003–04	Northampton	8	(0)
2004–05	Bourgoin		
2005–13	Worcester	181	(5)
Provincial / State sides
Years	Team	Apps	(Points)
1998-2000	Auckland		
2000-2001	Bay of Plenty		
2001-2003	North Harbour		
Super Rugby
Years	Team	Apps	(Points)
2001	Blues	10	(0)
2003	Chiefs	8	(0)
International career
Years	Team	Apps	(Points)
1998–2012	Tonga	29	(12)
2004–2006	Pacific Islanders	6	(0)
- Correct as of 13 November 2011

Tevita Taumoepeau (born 16 May 1974) is a former Tongan international rugby union player. The final club he played for was Worcester Warriors in the Aviva Premiership. He played as a tighthead prop

== Career ==
Taumoepeau joined Worcester during the summer of 2005 from French side Bourgoin. He made his debut in Worcester against Northampton Saints in the Powergen Cup and has been a consistent member of the squad throughout Worcester's league and cup campaigns.

Taumoepeau has also previously played for the Chiefs, the Blues, Northampton and Bourgoin.

The durable front row made his 150th appearance for Warriors against Nottingham in 2011.

In 2012, Tevita was struck with a neck injury which left him with a disabled left hand due to a nerve injury. It forced him to retire at the age of thirty-eight.
