= Norman Ligairi =

Fiji international rugby union player

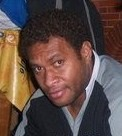
- Born: Norman Armstrong Senibici Ligairi; 29 January 1976 (age 50) Nadi, Fiji
- Height: 184 cm (6 ft 0 in)
- Weight: 100 kg (15 st 10 lb; 220 lb)

Rugby union career
- Position(s): Fullback, Wing
Amateur team(s)
Years	Team	Apps	(Points)
- Nadroga
Senior career
Years	Team	Apps	(Points)
2001–2002	Harlequins	0	(0)
2002	Southland	7	
2003–2006	Secom Rugguts		
2006–2009	Brive	46	(85)
2009–2011	La Rochelle	47	(65)
International career
Years	Team	Apps	(Points)
2000–2010	Fiji	47	(80)
2004–2006	Pacific Islanders	5	(0)
National sevens team
Years	Team		Comps
2001–2006	Fiji		8
Medal record
Men's rugby sevens
Representing Fiji
Commonwealth Games
Silver medal – second place	2002 Manchester	Team competition
Bronze medal – third place	2006 Melbourne	Team competition

Norman Armstrong Senibici Ligairi (born 29 January 1976 in Nadi) is a Fijian former rugby union player who usually played as a fullback. He represented Fiji at the international level in both the 15-a-side and 7-a-side game. Ligairi is to date the only Fijian to have scored two tries against the All Blacks in a game.

== Biography ==
The youngest son of Abundant Life Assemblies of God evangelist the late Rev, Epi Qaidamu Ligairi and grandnephew of coup security chief and former SAS officer Major Ilisoni Ligairi.

== Career ==
Ligairi made his international debut in May 2000 against Tonga at Nukuʻalofa, and went on to feature in four other internationals that season. In 2001 he was capped five times for Fiji, and following further Tests in June 2002 he toured the northern hemisphere in November and played in matches against Wales, Ireland and Scotland.

Following games against Argentina and Chile, Ligairi was included in the Fiji squad for the 2003 Rugby World Cup which was hosted by Australia. He scored two tries in the pool match against Japan.

Ligairi was capped twice the following year, and went on to play for the Pacific Islanders in the matches against Australia and South Africa. He was capped eight times in 2005, including touring in November. In 2006 he was a part of the Fiji sevens team which won bronze at the rugby event at the 2006 Commonwealth Games. He went on to feature in the inaugural Pacific 5 Nations for Fiji. He is currently playing for La Rochelle in the Pro D2 Competition.

He was Fiji's first choice fullback between 2000 and 2007 and he is third in Fiji's all time try scorers list with 18.

He is also the only Fijian ever to score 2 tries against New Zealand.
