= Census Johnston =

Samoa international rugby union player

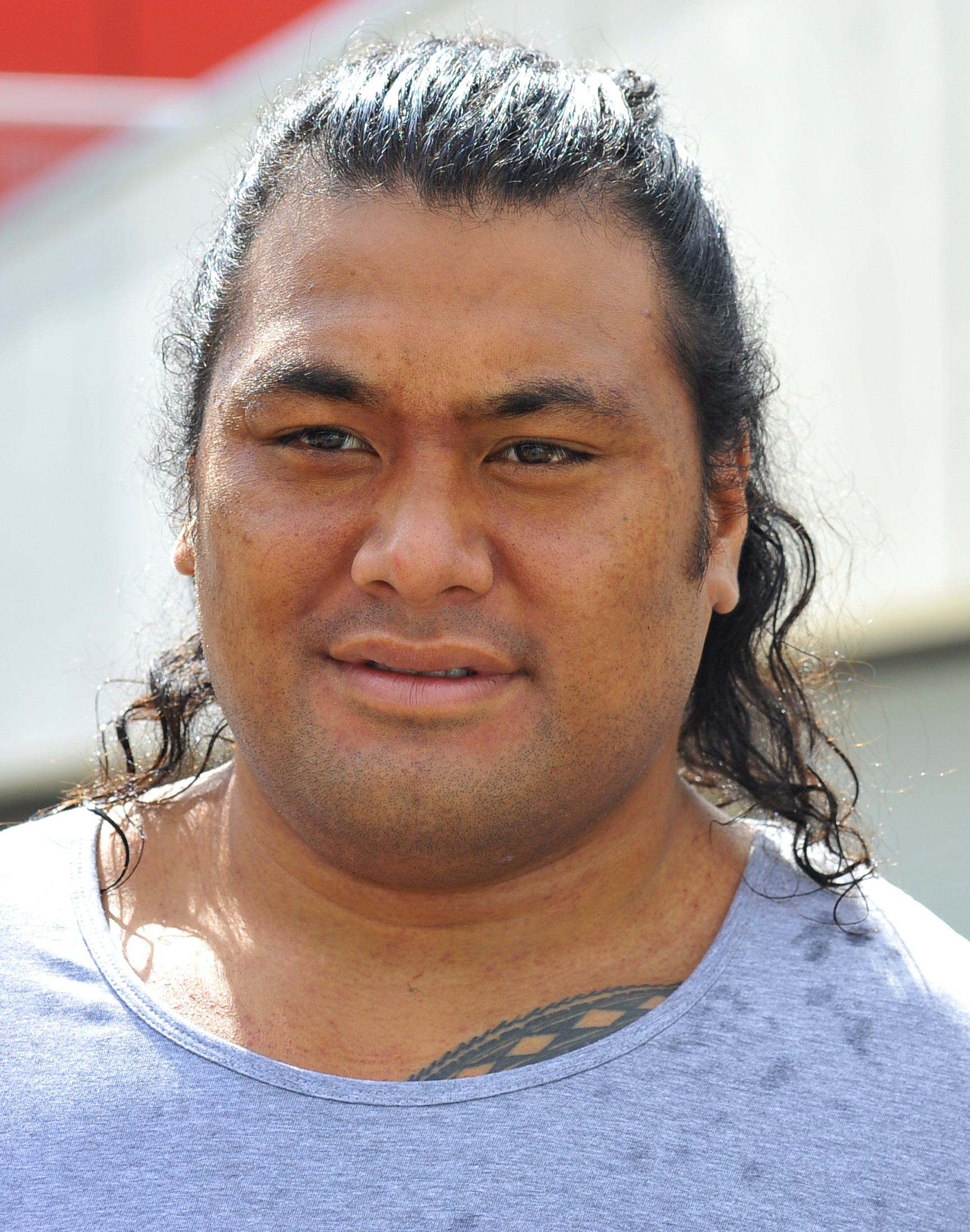
- Born: Census Aokuso Iopu Johnston; 6 May 1981 (age 45) Auckland, New Zealand
- Height: 189 cm (6 ft 2 in)
- Weight: 137 kg (21 st 8 lb; 302 lb)
- Notable relative: James Johnston (brother)

Rugby union career
- Position: Prop
Senior career
Years	Team	Apps	(Points)
2005	Taranaki	1	(0)
2006	Biarritz	15	(0)
2006	Taranaki	9	(10)
2006–2009	Saracens	61	(30)
2009–2017	Toulouse	222	(60)
2017–2019	Racing 92	26	(0)
2019–2020	Bayonne	4	(0)
- Correct as of 1 December 2019
International career
Years	Team	Apps	(Points)
2005–2015	Samoa	57	(20)
2006–2008	Pacific Islanders	3	(0)
- Correct as of 16 June 2017

Census Johnston (born 6 May 1981) is a former Samoan rugby union player. He has represented Samoa several times, and was in the Pacific Islanders' (combined Fiji, Samoa, Tonga) team which toured Europe in November 2006 and earned 6 Caps with English Barbarians F.C . His usual position is prop. Johnston previously played for Saracens F.C. in the English Guinness Premiership, as well as for Biarritz Olympique Stade Toulousain. Racing 92 and Aviron Bayonnais, also in the French Top 14. He also played for Taranaki in the 2006 Air New Zealand Cup. Census attended Rosebank Primary School and Waitākere College and Avondale college in Auckland before moving to Europe in 2005, winning 3x French Top 14 championships [2006 Biarritz 2011, 2012 Toulouse] and Heineken cup championship in 2010 also with Toulouse. In 2010 he was a replacement for the final as Toulouse won the Heineken Cup. In 2015 he was selected for Manu Samoa.

At the age of 36 he signed to Racing 92 for 2 seasons [2018/2019], playing a final season with Aviron Bayonnais before his retirement in 2020 aged 39.
