= Mosese Rauluni =

Fiji international rugby union player

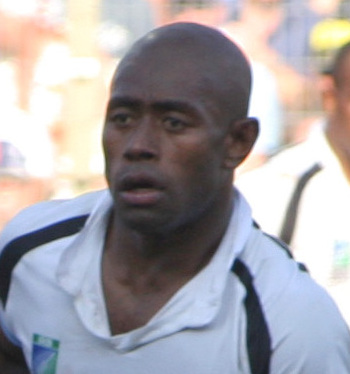
- South Africa vs Fiji during 2007 Rugby World Cup
- Born: Mosese Nasau Rauluni; 26 June 1975 (age 51) Suva, Fiji
- Height: 1.77 m (5 ft 10 in)
- Weight: 86 kg (190 lb)
- Notable relative(s): Jacob Rauluni; Waisale Serevi

Rugby union career
- Position: Scrum-half
Senior career
Years	Team	Apps	(Points)
1995–2003	Brisbane Easts		
2003	Crusaders		
2004–10	Saracens	99	(35)
International career
Years	Team	Apps	(Points)
1996–2009	Fiji	43	(20)
2004–2008	Pacific Islanders	9	(0)
National sevens team
Years	Team		Comps
- Fiji
Coaching career
- Years: Team
- 2010–12: Saracens Academy
- 2011: Fiji (Assistant Coach)
- 2012: Harrow School XV
- 2014–: Fiji (Assistant Coach)
- 2024: Fijian Drua Women

Mosese Nasau Rauluni (born 26 June 1975) is a retired Fijian rugby union footballer. He usually plays at scrum half, and played for Saracens in the Guinness Premiership in England. He has played for Fiji, including captaining them. He is the younger brother of Jacob Rauluni and first cousin of Waisale Serevi.

== Rugby career ==
Rauluni was brought up in Brisbane and played his club rugby for Easts from 1995 to 2004. He represented the Australian U-19s in 1993–94. He made his test debut for Fiji on 1 November 1996 in a match against the New Zealand Māori. The following season he was capped another three times for Fiji, playing in test matches against Tonga, the Cook Islands and Samoa. The following season he played in a Test against the Wallabies.

Rauluni returned to the international scene for Fiji in May 1999, playing against the United States and then playing subsequent matches against Spain and Italy. He was included in Fiji's 1999 Rugby World Cup squad, and played in all four pool matches. After the World Cup, he earned another five caps during the subsequent season for Fiji. He played only one test in 2001, on 25 May against Tonga.

In 2003 Rauluni played in a match against Tonga and in fixtures against Argentina and Chile. He was selected for Fiji's squad at the 2003 Rugby World Cup. He represented Fiji in four matches at the World Cup.

In 2004 Rauluni was capped twice for Fiji in games against Samoa and Tonga; these two games were actually 2007 World Cup qualifying matches, and Rauluni skippered Fiji on both occasions. In July of that year he was selected as part of the Pacific Islanders side, which was a touring team composed of the best Fijian, Samoan and Tongan players. The Pacific Islanders played matches against South Africa, Australia and the All Blacks. He was capped nine times during 2005.

In May 2006 he re-signed with the Saracens until the 2007/08 season. He was a key to help Fiji to reach the quarterfinal at the 2007 RWC. Some regarded him as the half back of the tournament. He captained the Pacific Islanders in 2008 on their European tour which included games against England, France and Italy.

Rauluni was forced to retire from rugby due to a serious knee injury in June 2010.

=== Coaching ===
Rauluni was recruited by Sam Domoni, the Flying Fijians head coach, ahead of the 2011 Rugby World Cup, which would see him coach the backs. In June 2010 he coached the Saracens academy side, with Kevin Sorrell, before becoming head coach of Harrow School, an English private school.

Rauluni returned to Fiji in 2014, joining the new coaching set up under John McKee of which He and McKee guided Fiji to qualification to the 2015 Rugby World Cup. He is now the Defensive and skills coach with the national team.

In January 2024, he was appointed as the new Head Coach for the Fijian Drua Women in the Super Rugby Women's competition.
