= Kameli Ratuvou =

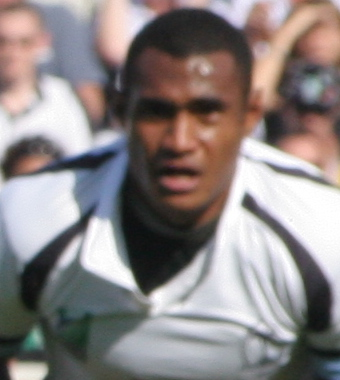
- Born: 6 November 1983 (age 43) Moala, Fiji
- Height: 1.91 m (6 ft 3 in)
- Weight: 89 kg (14 st 0 lb)
- Notable relative: Iliesa Keresoni (brother)

Rugby union career
- Position(s): Wing, Centre, Fullback
Senior career
Years	Team	Apps	(Points)
2001–2004	Knights	4	(0)
2006	Warriors	6	(0)
2006–2013	Saracens	99	(160)
2013−2014	Zebre	21	(5)
International career
Years	Team	Apps	(Points)
2005–2012	Fiji	20	(30)
2006–2008	Pacific Islanders	6	(20)
National sevens team
Years	Team		Comps
2004–2005	Fiji		5

Kameli Ratuvou (born 6 November 1983) is a Fijian rugby union player.

== Career ==
He is currently playing for professional English club, Saracens he joined the squad from Fiji for the 2006/07 season. His usual position is on the wing even though he can also play at centre and fullback. He has just signed a contract to keep him with Saracens until the end of the 2010 season.

Ratuvou is also an international for Fiji, and played for them during the 2006 IRB Pacific 5 Nations, and scored a try in the 24–23 loss against Tonga. He was then selected to play for the Pacific Islanders for the tour of Great Britain. He scored tries in the games against Wales and Scotland.
