= Pacific Islanders rugby union team =

Pacific Islanders
- Union: Pacific Islands Rugby Alliance; Fiji Rugby Union; Samoa Rugby Football Union; Tonga Rugby Football Union
- Coach: (Tonga) Quddus Fielea (2008)
- Captain: (Fiji) Moses Rauluni (2008)
- Top scorer: (Fiji) Kameli Ratuvou (15)
Team kit

First match
- Queensland Reds 29–48 Pacific Islanders (20 June 2004)

Largest win
- NSW Waratahs 21–68 Pacific Islanders (25 June 2004)

Largest defeat
- Ireland 61–17 Pacific Islanders (26 November 2006)

The Pacific Islanders was a combined international rugby union team that played from 2004 to 2008. It represented Fiji, Samoa and Tonga; Niue and the Cook Islands also supplied players to the squad for their tour in 2004. The team did not play at Rugby World Cups, where each of the nations continued to represent themselves.

== History ==
=== Australia/New Zealand 2004 ===
The Pacific Islands Rugby Alliance (PIRA) was formed in 2003. The coach is appointed by the Islanders board and in turn supported by the national coaches of Fiji, Samoa and Tonga. Its team, the Pacific Islanders, is drawn from the best Fijian, Tongan and Samoan players, and created great interest in their inaugural 2004 tour. They lost every game, 29-14 v Australia, 41-26 v New Zealand and 38-24 v South Africa. The Islanders did beat a Queensland XV 48-29 at Ballymore and NSW Waratahs 68-21 at Australia Stadium.

=== Celtic Nations 2006 ===
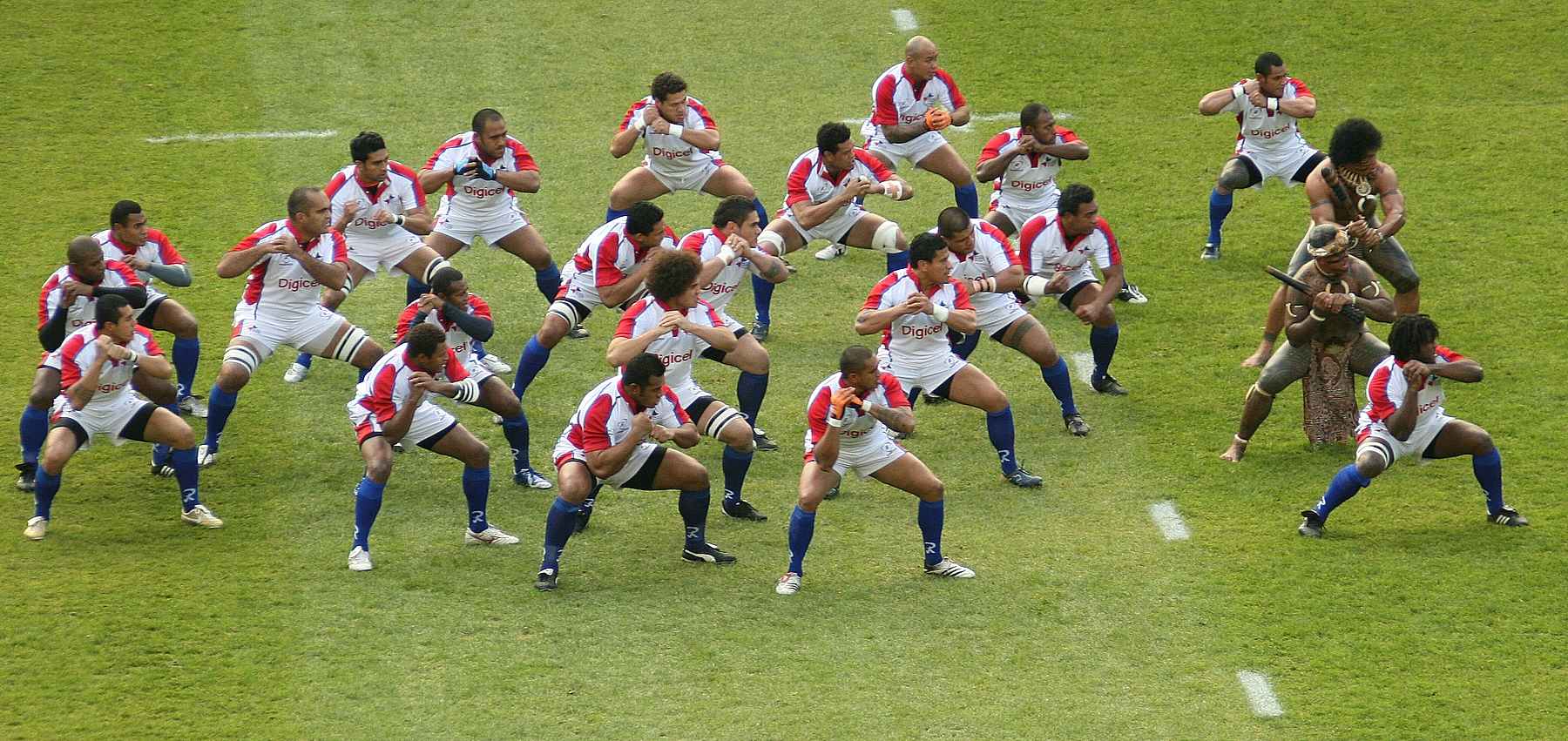
The Pacific Islanders before their match against Scotland

As the individual nations were primarily concerned with qualifying for the next World Cup the Islanders did not tour again until 2006. Scheduled matches against Italy and New Zealand in June 2006 did not take place, but they undertook a Northern Hemisphere tour in late 2006 with matches against Scotland, Wales and Ireland. PIRA had ruled in July 2006 that the team selected for that year's tour to Great Britain and Ireland would consist only of players who had previously played for Fiji, Manu Samoa or Tonga. This was intended to ensure that the Pacific Islanders team serves to develop players for the island nations only. Notably, two players on the 2004 tour, Sione Lauaki and Sitiveni Sivivatu (the latter the Islanders' leading scorer on that tour), went on to play for New Zealand. During that tour, they were the last opponents of Ireland at their traditional home of Lansdowne Road before its redevelopment into a modern all-seater stadium. The Pacific Islanders were beaten in all three matches.

=== Europe 2008 ===
In November 2008, the team toured Europe and played Tests against England, France and Italy. The team's manager was Major-General Sitiveni Rabuka, former Prime Minister of Fiji and author of two military coups in 1987. Though it began with two defeats, the tour ended with the Islanders' first ever win over European opposition, with a 25-17 victory in Italy.

=== Alliance ends in 2009 ===
In July 2009, the Samoa Rugby Union informed fellow Alliance members Fiji and Tonga that it had decided to quit the alliance because the merged Pacific Island team had failed to produce financial benefits sought by member unions.

The original concept was basically to provide an opportunity (to play) every two years. There were two aims, to get revenue to help in the running of the activities of the unions (and) to provide players with the opportunity to play against tier one sides. But the International Rugby Board changed the schedule for the Pacific Islands team to play every four years. Every four years won't generate the revenue needed to run our rugby.

— Peter Schuster, SRU Chairman, 2009

== Future status ==
There was speculation that the Islanders would be admitted into an expanded Super 12 competition or the Tri Nations Series, but instead the organisers of the Super 12 and the Tri Nations, SANZAR, opted to expand the Super 14 by adding one team each in Australia and South Africa and an extra round of fixtures to the Tri Nations without admitting any new teams. French businessman Eric Series, owner of the Asia Pacific Dragons team, proposed a Pacific Islands team for the 2016 Super Rugby season but was outbid by the Japan Rugby Football Union.

In 2014, a match between the Pacific Islanders and the British & Irish Lions was proposed for the 2017 British & Irish Lions tour to New Zealand, but the match was never scheduled.

== Squad ==
The squad for the 2008 tour to Europe

Note: Flags indicate national union affiliation of the registered club.

| Player | Position | Club |
|---|---|---|
| (Samoa) Tani Fuga | Hooker | (England) Harlequins |
| (Fiji) Sunia Koto | Hooker | (England) London Welsh |
| (Tonga) Aleki Lutui | Hooker | (England) Worcester Warriors |
| Tonga Leaʻaetoa | Prop | (England) London Irish |
| (Samoa) Census Johnston | Prop | (England) Saracens |
| (Samoa) Kas Lealamanua | Prop | (France) Dax |
| (Tonga) Kisi Pulu | Prop | (France) Perpignan |
| (Samoa) Justin Va'a | Prop | (Scotland) Glasgow Warriors |
| (Tonga) Paino Hehea | Lock | (France) Racing Métro |
| (Fiji) Kele Leawere | Lock | (Japan) Hino Motors |
| (Samoa) Filipo Levi | Lock | (Japan) Ricoh Black Rams |
| (Tonga) Hale T-Pole | Lock | (Japan) Suntory Sungoliath |
| (Tonga) Nili Latu (vc) | Flanker | (Japan) Green Rockets |
| (Fiji) Semisi Naevo | Flanker | (Japan) Green Rockets |
| (Samoa) George Stowers | Flanker | (Japan) Kobelco Steelers |
| (Tonga) Viliami Vaki | Flanker | (France) Perpignan |
| (Fiji) Sisa Koyamaibole | Number 8 | (France) Toulon |
| (Tonga) Finau Maka | Number 8 | (France) Toulouse |

| Player | Position | Club |
|---|---|---|
| (Tonga) Sililo Martens | Scrum-half | (England) Sale Sharks |
| (Fiji) Mosese Rauluni (c) | Scrum-half | (England) Saracens |
| (Fiji) Seremaia Bai | Fly-half | (France) Clermont |
| (Tonga) Pierre Hola | Fly-half | (Japan) Kobelco Steelers |
| (Samoa) Seilala Mapusua | Centre | (England) London Irish |
| (Fiji) Seru Rabeni | Centre | (England) Leicester Tigers |
| (Tonga) Epi Taione | Centre | (England) Harlequins |
| (Fiji) Vilimoni Delasau | Wing | (France) Montauban |
| (Fiji) Napolioni Nalaga | Wing | (France) Clermont |
| (Samoa) Sailosi Tagicakibau | Wing | (England) London Irish |
| (Fiji) Kameli Ratuvou | Fullback | (England) Saracens |
| (Samoa) Gavin Williams | Fullback | (France) Dax |

- Two further players were originally included in the squad Sireli Bobo and Soane Tongaʻuiha. However Bobo became unavailable, and Tongaʻuiha later withdrew from the tour.

== Results ==
=== 2004 ===
20 June 2004

| Queensland XV | 29–48 | Pacific Islanders |
| Try: Pelesasa (2); Hynes; Kefu; Con: Milroy (3); Pen: Milroy | | Try: Sivivatu (3); Bai; Bobo; Fa'atau; Ligairi; Filise; Con: Bai (4) |

Ballymore, Brisbane
Attendance: 3,000
Referee: George Ayoub (Australia)

25 June 2004

| New South Wales | 21–68 | Pacific Islanders |
| Try: Turinui; McGann; Thaiday; Con: Burke (3) | | Try: Sivivatu (2); Filise (2); Mapusua (2); Bai; Koyamaibole; Tongaʻuiha; Fa'atau; Con: Bai (9) |

Aussie Stadium, Sydney
Attendance: 8,005
Referee: Greg Hinton (Australia)

3 July 2004

| Australia | 29–14 | Pacific Islanders |
| Try: Mortlock (2); Giteau (2); Cannon; Con: Roff; Burke | | Try: Lauaki; Bobo; Con: Bai (2) |

Adelaide Oval, Adelaide
Attendance: 19,266
Referee: André Watson (South Africa)

Australia: 15. Joe Roff, 14. Clyde Rathbone, 13. Stirling Mortlock, 12. Matt Giteau, 11. Lote Tuqiri, 10. Stephen Larkham, 9. George Gregan (capt), 8. David Lyons, 7. Phil Waugh, 6. Radike Samo, 5. Nathan Sharpe, 4. Justin Harrison, 3. Al Baxter, 2. Brendan Cannon, 1. Bill Young – Replacements: 16. Jeremy Paul, 17. Nic Henderson, 18. Dan Vickerman (yellow card) , 19. George Smith, 20. Chris Whitaker, 21. Matt Burke, 22. Chris Latham
Pacific Islanders: 15. Norman Ligairi, 14. Lome Fa'atau, 13. Seilala Mapusua, 12. Seremaia Baikeinuku, 11. Sitiveni Sivivatu, 10. Tanner Vili, 9. Moses Rauluni, 8. Alifereti Doviverata, 7. Sisa Koyamaibole, 6. Sione Lauaki, 5. Ifereimi Rawaqa, 4. Inoke Afeaki (capt), 3. Taufaʻao Filise, 2. Aleki Lutui, 1. Soane Tongaʻuiha - Replacements: 17. Tevita Taumoepeau, 18. Leo Lafaiali'i, 19. Semo Sititi, 20. Steven So'oialo, 21. Seru Rabeni, 22. Sireli Bobo – Unused: 16. Joeli Lotawa

10 July 2004

| New Zealand | 41–26 | Pacific Islanders |
| Try: Rokocoko (2); Marshall; Gear; Meeuws; Umaga; Con: Carter (4); Pen: Carter | | Try: Sivivatu (2); Rabeni; Lauaki; Con: Bai (3) |

North Harbour Stadium, Albany
Attendance: 22,000
Referee: Stuart Dickinson (Australia)

New Zealand: 15. Mils Muliaina, 14. Rico Gear, 13. Tana Umaga (capt.), 12. Dan Carter, 11. Joe Rokocoko, 10. Carlos Spencer, 9. Justin Marshall, 8. Xavier Rush, 7. Marty Holah, 6. Jono Gibbes, 5. Keith Robinson, 4. Chris Jack, 3. Carl Hayman, 2. Keven Mealamu, 1. Kees Meeuws – Replacements: 18. Jerry Collins, 20. Byron Kelleher, 21. Nick Evans – Unused: 16. Andrew Hore, 17. Greg Somerville, 19. Mose Tuiali'i, 22. Sam Tuitupou
Pacific Islanders: 15. Seru Rabeni, 14. Lome Fa'atau, 13. Brian Lima, 12. Seremaia Baikeinuku, 11. Sitiveni Sivivatu, 10. Tanner Vili, 9. Moses Rauluni, 8. Sisa Koyamaibole, 7. Alifereti Doviverata, 6. Sione Lauaki, 5. Ifereimi Rawaqa, 4. Inoke Afeaki (c), 3. Taufaʻao Filise, 2. Aleki Lutui, 1. Soane Tongaʻuiha - Replacements: 17. Tevita Taumoepeau, 18. Filipo Levi, 19. Semo Sititi, 19. Semo Sititi, 21. Tane Tuʻipulotu, 22. Sireli Bobo – Unused: 16. Joeli Lotawa, 20. Steven So'oialo

17 July 2004

| South Africa | 38–24 | Pacific Islanders |
| Try: Paulse (2); Cronjé; De Villiers; Con: Montgomery (3); Pen: Montgomery (4) | | Try: Sivivatu (2); Lauaki; Bobo; Con: Rabeni (2) |

Express Advocate Stadium, Gosford, Australia
Attendance: 15,732
Referee: Scott Young (Australia)

South Africa: 15. Percy Montgomery, 14. Breyton Paulse, 13. Marius Joubert, 12. De Wet Barry, 11. Jean de Villiers, 10. Jaco van der Westhuyzen, 9. Bolla Conradie, 8. Jacques Cronjé, 7. AJ Venter, 6. Schalk Burger, 5. Gerrie Britz, 4. Bakkies Botha, 3. Eddie Andrews, 2. John Smit (c), 1. Os du Randt – Replacements: 17. CJ van der Linde, 18. Quinton Davids, 19. Pedrie Wannenburg, 20. Fourie du Preez – Unused: 16. Danie Coetzee, 21. Brent Russell, 22. Gaffie du Toit
Pacific Islanders: 15. Norman Ligairi, 14. Sireli Bobo, 13. Seilala Mapusua, 12. Seru Rabeni, 11. Sitiveni Sivivatu, 10. Tanner Vili, 9. Moses Rauluni, 8. Sisa Koyamaibole, 7. Alifereti Doviverata, 6. Sione Lauaki, 5. Ifereimi Rawaqa, 4. Inoke Afeaki (capt.), 3. Tevita Taumoepeau, 2. Aleki Lutui, 1. Soane Tongaʻuiha - Replacements: 16. Joeli Lotawa, 17. Taufaʻao Filise, 18. Filipo Levi, 19. Tu Tamarua, 20. Steven So'oialo, 21. Seremaia Baikeinuku, 22. Brian Lima

=== 2006 ===
11 November 2006

| Wales | 38–20 | Pacific Islanders |
| Try: M. Jones; Hook; Morgan; Byrne; Sweeney; Con: Sweeney (5); Pen: Sweeney | | Try: Va'a; Mapusua; Ratuvou; Con: Pisi; Pen: Pisi |

Millennium Stadium, Cardiff
Attendance: 50,769
Referee: Wayne Barnes (England)

18 November 2006

| Scotland | 34–22 | Pacific Islanders |
| Try: Di Rollo; Callam; Brown; Henderson; Con: Paterson (4); Pen: Paterson; Drop: Di Rollo | | Try: Caucaunibuca; Ratuvou (2); Leo; Con: Pisi |

Murrayfield Stadium, Edinburgh
Attendance: 19,055
Referee: Bryce Lawrence (New Zealand)

26 November 2006

| Ireland | 61–17 | Pacific Islanders |
| Try: Hickie; Wallace; O'Kelly; Easterby (2); Horgan; Best; O'Connell; Con: Wallace (6); Pen: Wallace (3) | | Try: Rabeni; Fa'atau; Pisi; Con: Pisi |

Lansdowne Road, Dublin
Attendance: 43,000
Referee: Christophe Berdos (France)

=== 2008 ===
8 November 2008

| England | 39–13 | Pacific Islanders |
| Try: Sackey (2); Cipriani; Kennedy; Mears; Con: Cipriani (4); Pen: Cipriani (2) | Report | Try: Rabeni; Con: Hola; Pen: Hola; Bai |

Twickenham Stadium, London
Attendance: 55,427
Referee: Matt Goddard (Australia)

15 November 2008

| France | 42–17 | Pacific Islanders |
| Try: Tillous-Borde; Szarzewski; Heymans; Picamoles; Médard; Con: Skrela (4); Pen: Skrela (3) | (Report) | Try: Taione; Pen: Bai (4) |

Stade Auguste Bonal, Montbéliard
Attendance: 20,000
Referee: Nigel Owens (Wales)

22 November 2008

| Italy | 17–25 | Pacific Islanders |
| Try: Ghiraldini 16' c Mauro Bergamasco 65' c Con: Marcato (2); Pen: Marcato 6' | Report | Try: Delasau 3' c, 29' m Ratuvou 40' c Con: Bai (2); Pen: Bai 18', 42' |

Stadio Giglio, Reggio Emilia
Attendance: 13,595
Referee: Wayne Barnes (England)

== See also ==
- Pacific Islands Rugby Alliance
- Moana Pasifika
- Fiji national rugby union team
- Samoa national rugby union team
- Tonga national rugby union team
- First Nations & Pasifika XV
