= Seru Rabeni =

Fiji international rugby union player

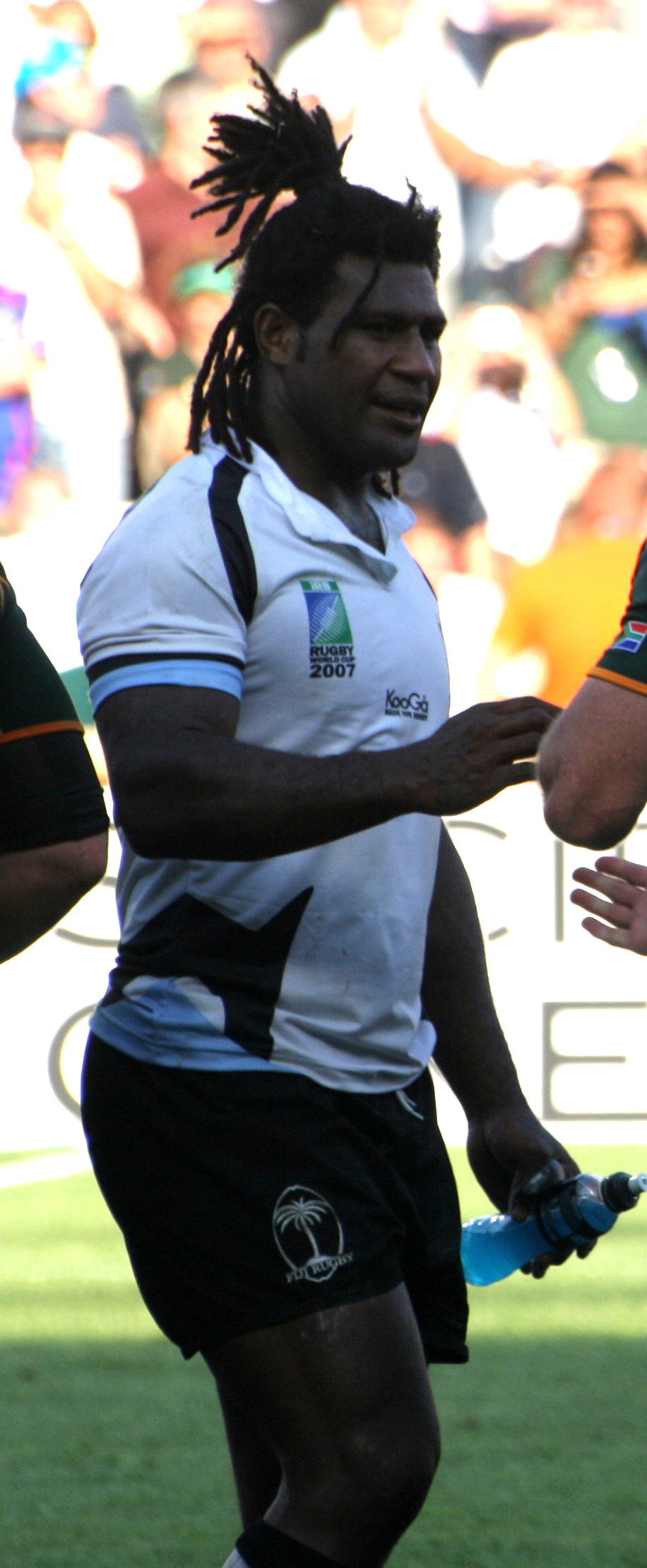
- South Africa vs Fiji during 2007 Rugby World Cup
- Born: Ratu Seru Rabeni; 27 December 1978 Bua, Fiji
- Died: 15 March 2016 (aged 37) Nausori, Fiji
- Height: 188 cm (6 ft 2 in)
- Weight: 106 kg (16 st 10 lb; 234 lb)
- School: Nadi District, Ratu Kadavulevu, Lautoka Teachers
- University: Otago University
- Notable relative: Rupeni Caucaunibuca (cousin)
- Occupation(s): Rugby Player & Coach

Rugby union career
- Position(s): Centre, Wing
Senior career
Years	Team	Apps	(Points)
1998–1999	Lautoka		
2000	Suva		
2002	Alhambra	7	(5)
2002	Otago	7	(5)
2003	Naitasiri		
2004	Otago	2	(0)
2004–2009	Leicester	63	(90)
2009–2010	Leeds	19	(5)
2010–2012	La Rochelle	41	(15)
2012–2013	Mont-de-Marsan	9	(0)
Super Rugby
Years	Team	Apps	(Points)
2003–04	Highlanders	11	(15)
International career
Years	Team	Apps	(Points)
2000–2011	Fiji	30	(10)
2004–2008	Pacific Islanders	9	(19)
National sevens team
Years	Team		Comps
1998–2002	Fiji 7s		13
Medal record
Men's rugby sevens
Representing Fiji
Commonwealth Games
Silver medal – second place	2002 Manchester	Team competition

Ratu Seru Rabeni (27 December 1978 – 15 March 2016) was a Fijian rugby union player. He played as a centre or wing. At both club and international level, his physicality and heavy tackles earned him the nickname "Rambo".

== Career ==
=== Early career ===
Rabeni was born and raised in Bua, Fiji, and played rugby union since his early schooldays at Ratu Kadavulevu School. He first played provincial rugby for Lautoka in 1998–99 while studying at Lautoka Teachers College, before moving on to the capital's club Suva in 2000. Rabeni made his Sevens debut in Dubai in 1998, playing in two Hong Kong Sevens tournaments. He played at both U21 and U23 level for Fiji before making his test debut in May 2000 against Japan in Tokyo during the Epson Cup tournament. An ankle injury saw him miss the remainder of the tournament.

In 2001, Rabeni took up a three-year degree course at the University of Otago, New Zealand, and the following year played 7 games for Otago in the National Provincial Championship before gaining a Super 12 contract with Highlanders for whom he played a dozen games over the 2003 and 2004 season.

=== Europe ===
Rabeni signed for English club Leicester Tigers shortly after being named in the Pacific Islanders squad. Rabeni scored 12 tries in 39 appearances, but suffered from knee injuries throughout his time at Welford Road, leading to him missing a season. He was also banned for 14 weeks for gouging Saracens player Andy Kyriacou in April 2008. In his time at Leicester he helped them win the Premiership in 2007, starting in the final.

In 2009 he was signed up by fellow Guinness Premiership team Gloucester on a 3-year deal. However, in August the deal fell through when he failed a medical. After this move fell through, he signed for newcomers Leeds Carnegie.

In 2010 he signed for French newcomers in Top 14 Stade Rochelais. Rabeni's final professional rugby signing was Stade Montois for the 2012–13 season when they were promoted to the Top 14.

== International ==
Rabeni toured New Zealand with Fiji in 2002, and the same year played Wales at the Millennium Stadium in Cardiff. He appeared for Fiji Sevens in the 2002 Commonwealth Games in Manchester. In 2003 he toured with the national side to South America, scoring a try in the 41–16 victory over Chile in Santiago. In 2004, he played in all three games for the newly formed Pacific Islanders, scoring a try against New Zealand in Albany and 2 conversions against South Africa in Gosford. Rabeni played for the Pacific Islanders numerous times and was one of a few players to go on every tour, in 2004, 2006 and 2008. He scored 3 tries and 2 conversions.

Rabeni started all four of Fiji's pool games in the 2003 Rugby World Cup, playing at centre in the games against France and the USA in Brisbane, Japan in Townsville and Scotland in Sydney.

Rabeni represented Fiji in the 2007 World Cup in France playing in all 4 Pool B games and the quarterfinals. He demonstrated his tackling ability against Australia, injuring two of their players. He was also instrumental in the Pool B decider helping Fiji beat Wales 38–34 and reach the quarterfinals for the 2nd time since 1987. He ended the cup with only one try, against Japan in their opening game.

== Coaching career ==
During the summer 2013, Rabeni moved to the United States to become an Assistant Coach for the college rugby team of Lindenwood University in Saint Louis, Missouri.

In September 2014, Rabeni then moved to Hong Kong to be with his life partner, Susan Macdonald, and daughter, Ayami Rabeni, where he was focusing on completing his master's degree in Sports Marketing & Business Management (distance learning with UCLan, UK) that led to the Head Coach position of the Discovery Bay Pirates focusing on youth (U13s to U19s) and was set as a player coach for the Pirates Championship team. He was to work alongside Craig Hammond of Hong Kong Scottish where he would have likewise played for this premiership team.

== Hong Kong National League ==
In 2014–2015 season, Rabeni was Head Coach/Player for Hong Kong's largest rugby club DB Pirates 1st and 2nd XV. His last professional appearance in March 2015 was with the Hong Kong Scottish Exiles in the HK Rugby 10s reaching the Cup Semi Finals. For the 2015–16 season, DB Pirates set-up a Chief Rugby Officer position for Rabeni sponsored by HKRFU with comments in the HK rugby community that he was on track to become HK's next National Coach. Rabeni visited Fiji in June 2015 to try and qualify for the World Cup one last time. Unfortunately, he was delayed in returning to Hong Kong to take up the HKRFU position due to ongoing financial issues with his own transport business in Fiji. His tragic and unexpected passing coincided with the week he planned to return to Hong Kong where he had lined up corporate speaking events for the 2016 HK Rugby 7s.

== Death ==
In the morning of 15 March 2016, Rabeni suddenly died while having breakfast at his home in Nausori, Fiji. The cause of death was heart failure (suspected viral cardiomyopathy). Rabeni developed flu symptoms and shortness of breath from December 2015, but brushed off his symptoms as just flu.

== See also ==
- List of rugby union players banned for eye gouging
