= Japan at the Rugby World Cup =

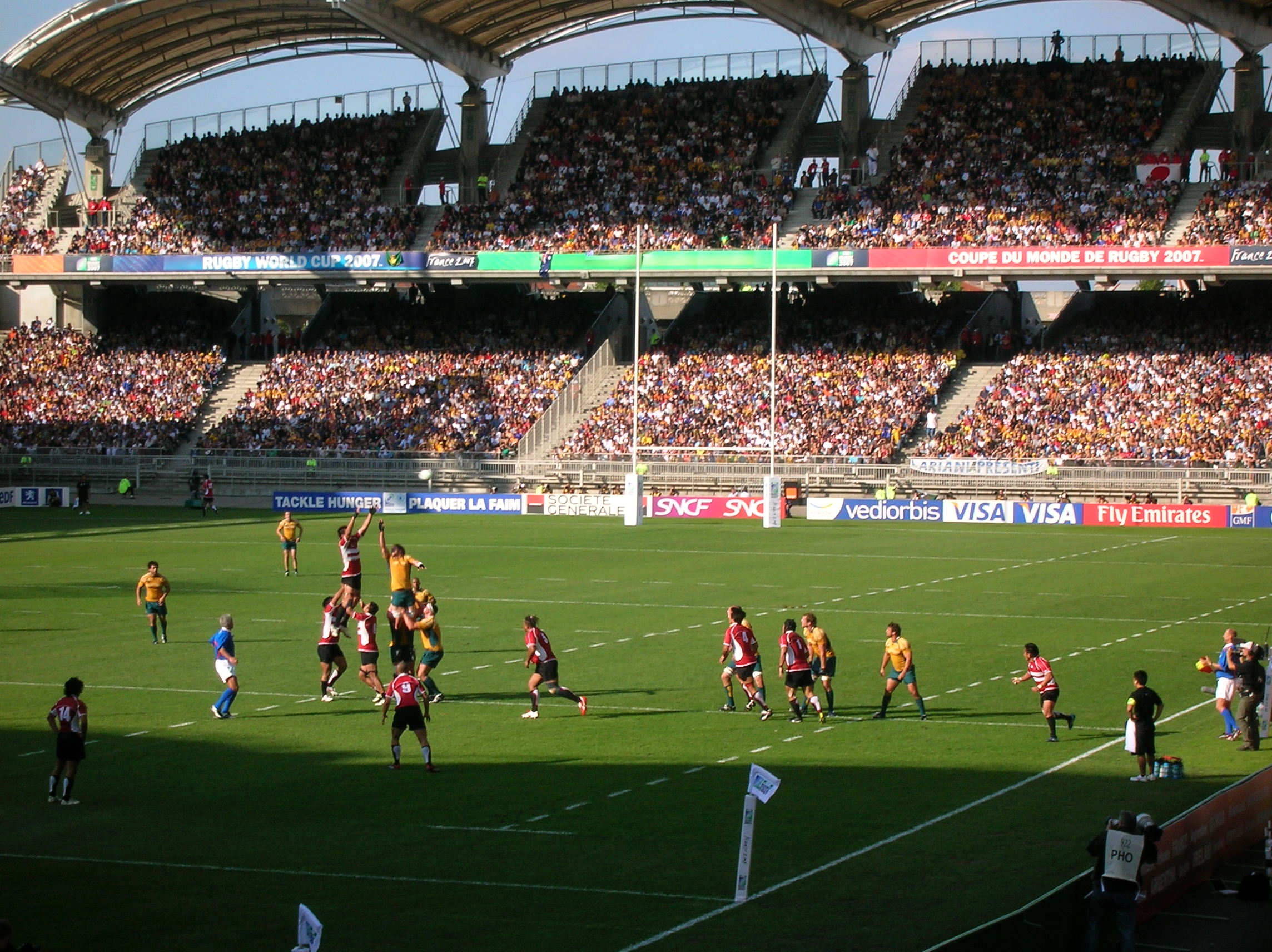
Japan playing Australia at the 2007 Rugby World Cup.

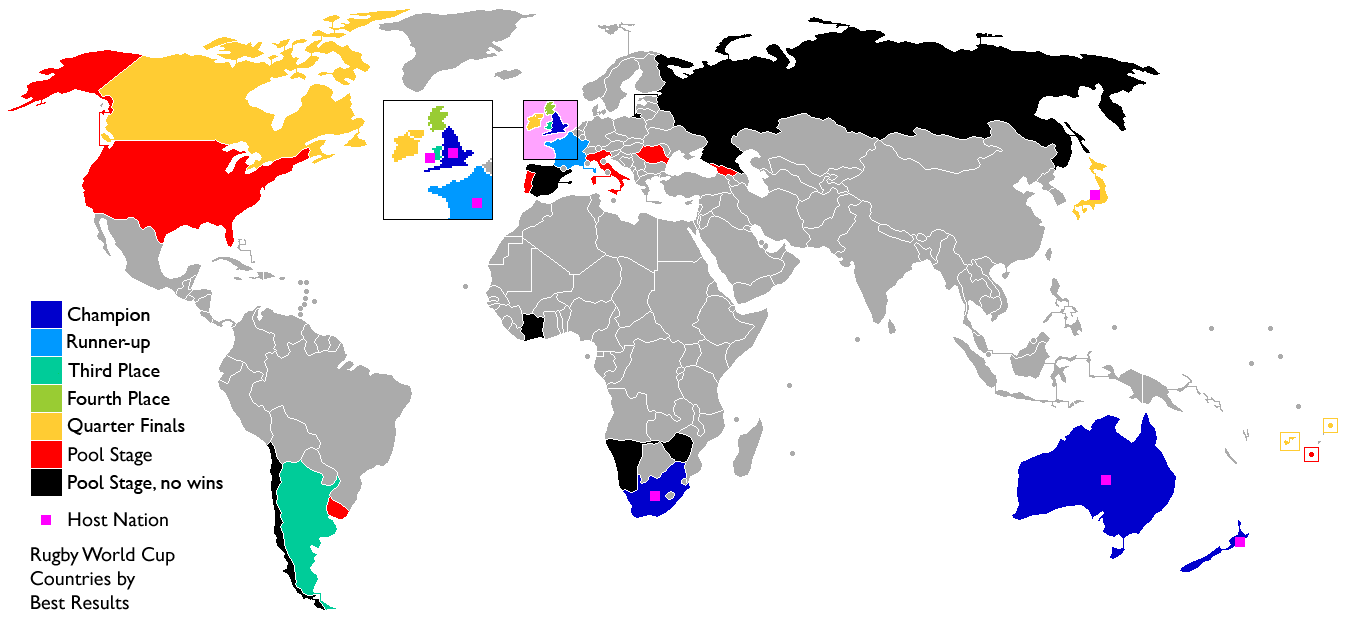
Map of nations best results, excluding nations which unsuccessfully participated in qualifying tournaments

The Japan national team have competed in every Rugby World Cup since the inaugural tournament in 1987. They are so far the only team to reach the Rugby World Cup through Asian regional qualifying. In 2019, they progressed to the quarterfinals for the first time in their participation, making them the first Asian team to do so in the tournament.

Their best performance was in the 2015 Rugby World Cup. Japan beat South Africa 34–32 in their first match of pool play, in what was described as the "greatest Rugby World Cup shock ever". They went on to beat Samoa and the United States in pool play. They won three games out of four in pool play, the same as Scotland and South Africa, but unlike the other two, Japan did not get any bonus points, so the other two qualified for the quarter-finals.

Japan's first victory was a 52–8 win over Zimbabwe at the 1991 tournament under coach Hiroaki Shukuzawa. Their worst defeat came at the 1995 Rugby World Cup, when they lost to New Zealand by 145–17, in a defeat blamed for setting the development of rugby union in Japan back by several years.

In 2007 ended a 13 match World Cup losing streak with a draw against Canada. In 2011 Japan drew with Canada again.

Japan hosted the tournament for the first time at the 2019 Rugby World Cup, reaching the quarter-finals. Typhoon Hagibis impacted the tournament, causing three matches to be cancelled and threatened some other matches.

== By position ==
| Rugby World Cup record | | | | | | | | | Qualification | | | | | | |
| Year | Round | Pld | W | D | L | PF | PA | Squad | Pos | Pld | W | D | L | PF | PA |
|---|---|---|---|---|---|---|---|---|---|---|---|---|---|---|---|
| (New Zealand) 1987 | Pool stage | 3 | 0 | 0 | 3 | 48 | 123 | Squad | Invited | | | | | | |
| (England) (France) (Ireland) (Scotland) (Wales) 1991 | Pool stage | 3 | 1 | 0 | 2 | 77 | 87 | Squad | 2nd | 3 | 2 | 0 | 1 | 65 | 63 |
| (South Africa) 1995 | Pool stage | 3 | 0 | 0 | 3 | 55 | 252 | Squad | 1st | 4 | 4 | 0 | 0 | 252 | 28 |
| (Wales) 1999 | Pool stage | 3 | 0 | 0 | 3 | 36 | 140 | Squad | 1st | 3 | 3 | 0 | 0 | 221 | 25 |
| (Australia) 2003 | Pool stage | 4 | 0 | 0 | 4 | 79 | 163 | Squad | 1st | 4 | 4 | 0 | 0 | 420 | 47 |
| (France) 2007 | Pool stage | 4 | 0 | 1 | 3 | 64 | 210 | Squad | 1st | 6 | 6 | 0 | 0 | 379 | 60 |
| (New Zealand) 2011 | Pool stage | 4 | 0 | 1 | 3 | 69 | 184 | Squad | 1st | 4 | 4 | 0 | 0 | 326 | 30 |
| (England) 2015 | Pool stage | 4 | 3 | 0 | 1 | 98 | 100 | Squad | 1st | 8 | 8 | 0 | 0 | 658 | 41 |
| (Japan) 2019 | Quarter-finals | 5 | 4 | 0 | 1 | 118 | 88 | Squad | Automatic qualification | | | | | | |
| (France) 2023 | Pool stage | 4 | 2 | 0 | 2 | 109 | 107 | Squad | Automatic qualification | | | | | | |
| (Australia) 2027 | Qualified | | | | | | | | Automatic qualification | | | | | | |
| (United States) 2031 | To be determined | | | | | | | | To be determined | | | | | | |
| Total | — | 37 | 10 | 2 | 25 | 753 | 1454 | — | — | 31 | 30 | 0 | 1 | 2295 | 283 |
Champions; Runners–up; Third place; Fourth place; Home venue

== By match ==
=== 1987 ===
| Team | Pld | W | D | L | PF | PA | PD | T | Pts | Qualification |
|---|---|---|---|---|---|---|---|---|---|---|
| Australia | 3 | 3 | 0 | 0 | 108 | 41 | +67 | 18 | 6 | Knockout stage |
| England | 3 | 2 | 0 | 1 | 100 | 32 | +68 | 15 | 4 | Knockout stage |
| United States | 3 | 1 | 0 | 2 | 39 | 99 | −60 | 5 | 2 | |
| Japan | 3 | 0 | 0 | 3 | 48 | 123 | −75 | 7 | 0 | |

24 May 1987

| Japan | 18–21 | United States |
| Try: Taumoefolau (2); Yoshinaga; Pen: Yoshinaga; Kutsuki | Report | Try: Nelson; Purcell; Lambert; Con: Nelson (3); Pen: Nelson |

Ballymore, Brisbane
Attendance: 4,000
Referee: Guy Maurette (France)

30 May 1987

| England | 60–7 | Japan |
| Try: Harrison (3); Underwood (2); Salmon; Richards; Redman; Rees; Simms; Con: Webb (7); Pen: Webb (2) | Report | Try: Miyamoto; Pen: Matsuo |

Concord Oval, Sydney
Attendance: 4,893
Referee: René Hourquet (France)

3 June 1987

| Australia | 42–23 | Japan |
| Try: Slack (2); Burke (2); Tuynman; Grigg; Hartill; Campese; Con: Lynagh (5) | Report | Try: Kutsuki (2); Fujita; Con: Okidoi; Pen: Okidoi (2); Drop: Okidoi |

Concord Oval, Sydney
Attendance: 8,785
Referee: Jim Fleming (Scotland)

=== 1991 ===
| Team | Pld | W | D | L | PF | PA | PD | Pts |
|---|---|---|---|---|---|---|---|---|
| Scotland | 3 | 3 | 0 | 0 | 122 | 36 | +86 | 6 |
| Ireland | 3 | 2 | 0 | 1 | 102 | 51 | +51 | 4 |
| Japan | 3 | 1 | 0 | 2 | 77 | 87 | −10 | 2 |
| Zimbabwe | 3 | 0 | 0 | 3 | 31 | 158 | −127 | 0 |

5 October 1991

| Scotland | 47–9 | Japan |
| Tries: S. Hastings, Stanger, Chalmers, White, Penalty Try, Tukalo, G. Hastings; Con: G. Hastings (5); Pen: G. Hastings (2), Chalmers | | Tries: Hosokawa; Con: Hosokawa; Drop: Hosokawa |

Murrayfield, Edinburgh
Referee: Ed Morrison (England)

9 October 1991

| Ireland | 32–16 | Japan |
| Tries: Mannion (2), O’Hara, Staples; Con: Keyes (2); Pen: Keyes (4) | | Tries: Hayashi, Kajihara, Yoshida; Con: Hosokawa (2) |

Lansdowne Road, Dublin
Referee: Laikini Colati (Fiji)

14 October 1991

| Japan | 52–8 | Zimbabwe |
| Tries: Yoshida (2), Mashuho (2), Kutsuki (2), Horikoshi, Luaiufi, Matsuo; Con: Hosokawa (2); Pen: Hosokawa (4) | | Tries: Tsimba, Nguruve |

Ravenhill, Belfast
Referee: Rene Hourquet (France)

=== 1995 ===
| Team | Pld | W | D | L | PF | PA | PD | Pts |
|---|---|---|---|---|---|---|---|---|
| New Zealand | 3 | 3 | 0 | 0 | 222 | 45 | +177 | 9 |
| Ireland | 3 | 2 | 0 | 1 | 93 | 94 | −1 | 7 |
| Wales | 3 | 1 | 0 | 2 | 89 | 68 | +21 | 5 |
| Japan | 3 | 0 | 0 | 3 | 55 | 252 | −197 | 3 |

27 May 1995

| Japan | 10–57 | Wales |
| Tries: Osamu Ota (2) | | Tries: Gareth Thomas (3), Ieuan Evans (2), Andrew Moore, Hemi Taylor; Con: Neil Jenkins (5); Pen: Neil Jenkins (4) |

Free State Stadium, Bloemfontein
Attendance: 12 000
Referee: Efrahim Sklar (Argentina)

31 May 1995

| Ireland | 50–28 | Japan |
| Tries: Neil Francis, Simon Geoghegan, David Corkery, Eddie Halvey, Niall Hogan; Con: Paul Burke (6); Pen: Paul Burke | | Tries: Sinali Latu, Ko Izawa, Seiji Hirao, Masanori Takura; Con: Yoshihito Yoshida (4) |

Free State Stadium, Bloemfontein
Attendance: 15 000
Referee: Stef Neethling (South Africa)

4 June 1995

| Japan | 17–145 | New Zealand |
| Tries: Hiroyuki Kajihara (2); Con: Keiji Hirose (2); Pen: Keiji Hirose | | Tries: Marc Ellis (6), Eric Rush (3), Jeff Wilson (3), Robin Brooke (2), Glen Osborne (2), Richard Loe, Simon Culhane, Paul Henderson, Craig Dowd, Alama Ieremia; Con: Simon Culhane (20) |

Free State Stadium, Bloemfontein
Attendance: 17 000
Referee: George Gadjovic (Canada)

=== 1999 ===
| Team | Pld | W | D | L | PF | PA | PD | Pts |
|---|---|---|---|---|---|---|---|---|
| Wales | 3 | 2 | 0 | 1 | 118 | 71 | +47 | 7 |
| Samoa | 3 | 2 | 0 | 1 | 97 | 72 | +25 | 7 |
| Argentina | 3 | 2 | 0 | 1 | 83 | 51 | +32 | 7 |
| Japan | 3 | 0 | 0 | 3 | 36 | 140 | −104 | 3 |

3 October 1999

| Samoa | 43–9 | Japan |
| Tries: Brian Lima (2), Steven So'oialo (2), Silao Leaega; Con: Silao Leaega (3); Pen: Silao Leaega (4) | | Pen: Keiji Hirose (3) |

Racecourse Ground, Wrexham
Referee: Andrew Cole (Australia)

9 October 1999

| Wales | 64–15 | Japan |
| Tries: Mark Taylor, (2) Robert Howley, Scott Gibbs, David Llewellyn, Gareth Thomas, Allan Bateman, Shane Howarth; Con: Neil Jenkins (8); Con: Neil Jenkins | | Tries: Patiliai Tuidraki, Daisuke Ohata; Con: Keiji Hirose; Pen: Keiji Hirose |

Millennium Stadium, Cardiff
Referee: Joel Dume (France)

16 October 1999

| Argentina | 33–12 | Japan |
| Tries: Diego Albanese, Agustín Pichot; Con: Felipe Contepomi; Pen: Gonzalo Quesada (7) | | Pen: Keiji Hirose (4) |

Millennium Stadium, Cardiff
Referee: Stuart Dickinson (Australia)

=== 2003 ===
| Team | Pld | W | D | L | PF | PA | PD | BP | Pts | Qualification |
|---|---|---|---|---|---|---|---|---|---|---|
| France | 4 | 4 | 0 | 0 | 204 | 70 | +134 | 4 | 20 | Quarter-finals |
| Scotland | 4 | 3 | 0 | 1 | 102 | 97 | +5 | 2 | 14 | Quarter-finals |
| Fiji | 4 | 2 | 0 | 2 | 98 | 114 | −16 | 2 | 10 | |
| United States | 4 | 1 | 0 | 3 | 86 | 125 | −39 | 2 | 6 | |
| Japan | 4 | 0 | 0 | 4 | 79 | 163 | −84 | 0 | 0 | |

11 October 2003

| Scotland | 32–11 | Japan |
| Tries: Paterson (2), Grimes, Taylor, Danielli; Con: Paterson, Townsend; Pen: Paterson | | Tries: Onozawa; Pen: Hirose (2) |

Dairy Farmers Stadium, Townsville
Attendance: 19,170
Referee: Stuart Dickinson (Australia)

18 October 2003

| France | 51–29 | Japan |
| Tries: Michalak, Rougerie (2), Pelous, Dominici, Crenca; Con: Michalak (5), Merceron; Pen: Michalak (3) | | Tries: Konia, Ohata; Con: Kurihara (2); Pen: Kurihara (5) |

Dairy Farmers Stadium, Townsville
Attendance: 21,309
Referee: Alan Lewis (Ireland)

23 October 2003

| Fiji | 41–13 | Japan |
| Tries: Tuilevu (2), Ligairi (2), Vunibaka; Con: Little (2); Pen: Little (4) | | Tries: Miller; Con: Miller; Pen: Miller; Drop: Miller |

Dairy Farmers Stadium, Townsville
Attendance: 17,269
Referee: Nigel Whitehouse (Wales)

27 October 2003

| Japan | 26–39 | United States |
| Tries: Kurihara, Ohata; Con: Kurihara (2); Pen: Kurihara (4) | | Tries: Hercus, Eloff, Schubert, van Zyl, Khasigian; Con: Hercus (4); Pen: Hercus (2) |

Bluetongue Central Coast Stadium, Gosford
Attendance: 19,653
Referee: Steve Walsh (New Zealand)

=== 2007 ===
| Pos | Team | Pld | W | D | L | PF | PA | PD | B | Pts | Qualification |
|---|---|---|---|---|---|---|---|---|---|---|---|
| 1 | Australia | 4 | 4 | 0 | 0 | 215 | 41 | +174 | 4 | 20 | Qualified for the quarter-finals |
| 2 | Fiji | 4 | 3 | 0 | 1 | 114 | 136 | −22 | 3 | 15 | Qualified for the quarter-finals |
| 3 | Wales | 4 | 2 | 0 | 2 | 168 | 105 | +63 | 4 | 12 | Eliminated, automatic qualification for RWC 2011 |
| 4 | Japan | 4 | 0 | 1 | 3 | 64 | 210 | −146 | 1 | 3 | |
| 5 | Canada | 4 | 0 | 1 | 3 | 51 | 120 | −69 | 0 | 2 | |

8 September 2007
15:45

| Australia | 91–3 | Japan |
| Tries: Sharpe 18' m Elsom (3) 24' c, 34' m, 41' c Ashley-Cooper 46' c Latham (2) 53' c, 72' c Barnes (2) 57' c, 75' c Mitchell (2) 59' c, 66' c Smith 62' m Freier 80+' c Con: Mortlock (7/10); Giteau (3/3); Pen: Mortlock (2/2) 10', 16' | Report | Pen: K. Ono (1/1) 38' |

Stade de Gerland, Lyon
Attendance: 40,043
Referee: Alan Lewis (Ireland)

12 September 2007
18:00

| Japan | 31–35 | Fiji |
| Tries: Thompson (2) 51' c, 78' c Soma 62' m Con: Onishi (2/3); Pen: Onishi (4/4) 18', 30', 40+', 43' | Report | Tries: Qera (2) 36' c, 49' c Rabeni 56' m Leawere 71' c Con: Little (3/4); Pen: Little (3/3) 4', 55', 74' |

Stadium de Toulouse, Toulouse
Attendance: 34,500
Referee: Marius Jonker (South Africa)

20 September 2007
21:00

| Wales | 72–18 | Japan |
| Tries: A. W. Jones 11' c Hook 24' c T. R. Thomas 31' c Morgan 40+' m Phillips 42' c S. Williams (2) 48' m, 80' m D. James 52' c Cooper 59' c M. Williams (2) 64' c, 74' c Con: S. Jones (5/7); Sweeney (2/4); Pen: S. Jones (1/1) 23' | Report | Tries: Endo 19' m Onozawa 57' c Con: Robins (1/1); Pen: Onishi (2/2) 4', 37' |

Millennium Stadium, Cardiff
Attendance: 35,245
Referee: Joël Jutge (France)

25 September 2007
18:00

| Canada | 12–12 | Japan |
| Tries: Riordan 48' m Van der Merwe 65' c Con: Pritchard (1/1) | Report | Tries: Endo 12' m Taira 80+' c Con: Onishi (1/2) |

Stade Chaban-Delmas, Bordeaux
Attendance: 33,810
Referee: Jonathan Kaplan (South Africa)

=== 2011 ===
Japan lost to New Zealand, Tonga and France, but managed to draw with Canada.

| Pos | Team | Pld | W | D | L | PF | PA | PD | T | B | Pts | Qualification |
|---|---|---|---|---|---|---|---|---|---|---|---|---|
| 1 | New Zealand | 4 | 4 | 0 | 0 | 240 | 49 | +191 | 36 | 4 | 20 | Advanced to the quarter-finals and qualified for the 2015 Rugby World Cup |
| 2 | France | 4 | 2 | 0 | 2 | 124 | 96 | +28 | 13 | 3 | 11 | Advanced to the quarter-finals and qualified for the 2015 Rugby World Cup |
| 3 | Tonga | 4 | 2 | 0 | 2 | 80 | 98 | −18 | 7 | 1 | 9 | Eliminated but qualified for 2015 Rugby World Cup |
| 4 | Canada | 4 | 1 | 1 | 2 | 82 | 168 | −86 | 9 | 0 | 6 | |
| 5 | Japan | 4 | 0 | 1 | 3 | 69 | 184 | −115 | 8 | 0 | 2 | |

10 September 2011

| France | 47–21 | Japan |
| Tries: Pierre 4' c Trinh-Duc 11' c Clerc 33' m Naller 70' c Pape 76' c Parra 81' m Con: Yachvili (4/6); Pen: Yachvili (3/3) 21', 28', 66' | Report | Tries: Arlidge (2) 30' m, 48' c Con: Arlidge (1/2); Pen: Arlidge (3/4) 17', 39', 57' |

North Harbour Stadium, Auckland

16 September 2011

| New Zealand | 83–7 | Japan |
| Tries: Smith 3' c Kahui (2) 15' m, 44' c Kaino 21' m Mealamu 29' c Ellis 33' c Slade 35' c Williams (2) 50' c, 78' c Toeava 55' c Hore 59' m Nonu 61' m Thomson 76' c Con: Slade (9/13) | Report | Tries: Onozawa 57' c Con: Williams (1/1) |

Waikato Stadium, Hamilton

21 September 2011

| Tonga | 31–18 | Japan |
| Tries: Ma'afu 6' m Lokotui 14' c Vainikolo 53' c Con: Morath (2/3); Pen: Morath (4/4) 29', 31', 49', 67' | Report | Tries: Hatakeyama 13' m Leitch 25' m Tupuailai 62' m Con: Arlidge (0/3); Pen: Webb (1/1) 39' |

Okara Park, Whangārei

27 September 2011

| Canada | 23–23 | Japan |
| Tries: Van der Merwe 6' c Mackenzie 43' m Monro 74' m Con: Pritchard (1/1); Monro (0/2); Pen: Monro (2/3) 63', 78' | Report | Tries: Horie 9' c Endo 39' c Tupuailai 62' m Con: Arlidge (2/2); Pen: Arlidge (3/3) 23', 65', 72' |

McLean Park, Napier

=== 2015 ===
| Pos | Team | Pld | W | D | L | PF | PA | PD | T | B | Pts | Qualification |
|---|---|---|---|---|---|---|---|---|---|---|---|---|
| 1 | South Africa | 4 | 3 | 0 | 1 | 176 | 56 | +120 | 23 | 4 | 16 | Advanced to the quarter-finals and qualified for the 2019 Rugby World Cup |
| 2 | Scotland | 4 | 3 | 0 | 1 | 136 | 93 | +43 | 14 | 2 | 14 | Advanced to the quarter-finals and qualified for the 2019 Rugby World Cup |
| 3 | Japan | 4 | 3 | 0 | 1 | 98 | 100 | −2 | 9 | 0 | 12 | Eliminated but qualified for 2019 Rugby World Cup |
| 4 | Samoa | 4 | 1 | 0 | 3 | 69 | 124 | −55 | 7 | 2 | 6 | |
| 5 | United States | 4 | 0 | 0 | 4 | 50 | 156 | −106 | 5 | 0 | 0 | |

19 September 2015
16:45

| South Africa | 32–34 | Japan |
| Try: Louw 18' c B. Du Plessis 33' m De Jager 44' c Strauss 62' c Con: Lambie (2/3) 19', 45'; Pollard (1/1) 63'; Pen: Lambie (1/1) 57'; Pollard (1/1) 73' | Report | Try: Leitch 30' c Goromaru 69' c Hesketh 80' m Con: Goromaru (2/3) 31', 70'; Pen: Goromaru (5/6) 8', 43', 49', 53', 60' |

Brighton Community Stadium, Brighton
Attendance: 29,290
Referee: Jérôme Garcès (France)

23 September 2015
14:30

| Scotland | 45–10 | Japan |
| Try: Hardie 48' m Bennett (2) 56' c, 69 c Seymour 64' c Russell 74' c Con: Laidlaw (4/5) 57', 65', 70', 75'; Pen: Laidlaw (4/5) 3', 12', 18', 20' | Report | Try: Mafi 15' c Con: Goromaru (1/1) 16'; Pen: Goromaru (1/3) 46' |

Kingsholm, Gloucester
Attendance: 14,354
Referee: John Lacey (Ireland)

3 October 2015
14:30

| Samoa | 5–26 | Japan |
| Try: Perez 64' m Con: T. Pisi (0/1) | Report | Try: Penalty try 24' c Yamada 40' c Con: Goromaru (2/2) 24', 40'; Pen: Goromaru (4/6) 8', 34', 48', 59' |

Stadium mk, Milton Keynes
Attendance: 29,019
Referee: Craig Joubert (South Africa)

11 October 2015
20:00

| United States | 18–28 | Japan |
| Try: Ngwenya 24' m Wyles 71' c Con: MacGinty (1/2) 72'; Pen: MacGinty (2/2) 5', 55' | Report | Try: Matsushima 7' c Fujita 28' c Mafi 62' m Con: Goromaru (2/3) 9', 29'; Pen: Goromaru (3/3) 33', 44', 77' |

Kingsholm, Gloucester
Attendance: 14,517
Referee: Glen Jackson (New Zealand)

=== 2019 ===
| Pos | Team | Pld | W | D | L | PF | PA | PD | T | B | Pts | Qualification |
|---|---|---|---|---|---|---|---|---|---|---|---|---|
| 1 | Japan | 4 | 4 | 0 | 0 | 115 | 62 | +53 | 13 | 3 | 19 | Advanced to the quarter-finals and qualified for the 2023 Rugby World Cup |
| 2 | Ireland | 4 | 3 | 0 | 1 | 121 | 27 | +94 | 18 | 4 | 16 | Advanced to the quarter-finals and qualified for the 2023 Rugby World Cup |
| 3 | Scotland | 4 | 2 | 0 | 2 | 119 | 55 | +64 | 16 | 3 | 11 | Eliminated but qualified for 2023 Rugby World Cup |
| 4 | Samoa | 4 | 1 | 0 | 3 | 58 | 128 | −70 | 8 | 1 | 5 | |
| 5 | Russia | 4 | 0 | 0 | 4 | 19 | 160 | −141 | 1 | 0 | 0 | |

20 September 2019
19:45 JST (UTC+09)

| (1 BP) Japan | 30–10 | Russia |
| Try: Matsushima (3) 12' m, 39' c, 69' c Labuschagné 47' m Con: Tamura (1/3) 40'; Matsuda (1/1) 71'; Pen: Tamura (2/2) 44', 64' | Report | Try: Golosnitski 5' c Con: Kushnarev (1/1) 6'; Pen: Kushnarev (1/1) 61' |

Tokyo Stadium, Chōfu
Attendance: 45,745
Referee: Nigel Owens (Wales)

28 September 2019
16:15 JST (UTC+09)

| Japan | 19–12 | Ireland (1 BP) |
| Try: Fukuoka 59' c Con: Tamura (1/1) 61'; Pen: Tamura (4/6) 18', 34', 40', 72' | Report | Try: Ringrose 14' m Kearney 21' c Con: Carty (1/2) 22' |

Shizuoka Stadium Ecopa, Fukuroi
Attendance: 47,813
Referee: Angus Gardner (Australia)

5 October 2019
19:30 JST (UTC+09)

| (1 BP) Japan | 38–19 | Samoa |
| Try: Lafaele 28' c Himeno 53' c Fukuoka 76' m Matsushima 80+5' c Con: Tamura (3/4) 29', 55', 80+7'; Pen: Tamura (4/5) 3', 8', 24', 51' | Report | Try: Taefu 73' c Con: Taefu (1/1) 74'; Pen: Taefu (4/5) 10', 15', 34', 45' |

City of Toyota Stadium, Toyota
Attendance: 39,695
Referee: Jaco Peyper (South Africa)

13 October 2019
19:45 JST (UTC+09)

| (1 BP) Japan | 28–21 | Scotland (1 BP) |
| Try: Matsushima 18' c Inagaki 26' c Fukuoka (2) 40' c, 43' c Con: Tamura (4/4) 20', 27', 40+2', 44' | Report | Try: Russell 7' c Nel 50' c Fagerson 55' c Con: Laidlaw (2/2) 8', 51'; Russell (1/1) 56' |

International Stadium Yokohama, Yokohama
Attendance: 67,666
Referee: Ben O'Keeffe (New Zealand)

Quarter-final

20 October 2019
19:15 JST (UTC+09)

| Japan | 3–26 | South Africa |
| Pen: Tamura (1/1) 20' | Report | Try: Mapimpi (2) 4' m, 70' m de Klerk 66' c Con: Pollard (1/3) 66'; Pen: Pollard (3/4) 44', 49', 64' |

Tokyo Stadium, Chōfu
Attendance: 48,831
Referee: Wayne Barnes (England)

=== 2023 ===
| Pos | Team | Pld | W | D | L | PF | PA | PD | TF | TA | B | Pts | Qualification |
|---|---|---|---|---|---|---|---|---|---|---|---|---|---|
| 1 | England | 4 | 4 | 0 | 0 | 150 | 39 | +111 | 17 | 3 | 2 | 18 | Advance to knockout stage, and qualification to the 2027 Men's Rugby World Cup |
| 2 | Argentina | 4 | 3 | 0 | 1 | 127 | 69 | +58 | 15 | 5 | 2 | 14 | Advance to knockout stage, and qualification to the 2027 Men's Rugby World Cup |
| 3 | Japan | 4 | 2 | 0 | 2 | 109 | 107 | +2 | 12 | 14 | 1 | 9 | Qualification to the 2027 Men's Rugby World Cup |
| 4 | Samoa | 4 | 1 | 0 | 3 | 92 | 75 | +17 | 11 | 7 | 3 | 7 | |
| 5 | Chile | 4 | 0 | 0 | 4 | 27 | 215 | −188 | 4 | 30 | 0 | 0 | |

Source: World Rugby
Rules for classification: Pool stage tiebreakers

10 September 2023
13:00 CEST (UTC+2)

| (1 BP) Japan | 42–12 | Chile |
| Try: Fakatava (2) 8' c, 40+1' c Naikabula 30' c Leitch 53' c Nakamura 71' c Dearns 79' c Con: Matsuda (6/6) 10', 31', 40+2', 54', 73', 80+1' | Report | Try: Fernández 6' c A. Escobar 48' m Con: Videla (1/2) 7' |

Stadium de Toulouse, Toulouse
Attendance: 30,187
Referee: Nic Berry (Australia)

17 September 2023
21:00 CEST (UTC+2)

| (1 BP) England | 34–12 | Japan |
| Try: Ludlam 24' c Lawes 56' c Steward 66' c Marchant 80+1' c Con: Ford (4/4) 26', 56', 67', 80+1'; Pen: Ford (2/3) 4', 42' | Report | Pen: Matsuda (4/4) 15', 23', 32', 54' |

Allianz Riviera, Nice
Attendance: 30,500
Referee: Nika Amashukeli (Georgia)

28 September 2023
21:00 CEST (UTC+2)

| Japan | 28–22 | Samoa (1 BP) |
| Try: Labuschagné 13' c Leitch 32' c Himeno 48' m Con: Matsuda (2/3) 15', 33'; Pen: Matsuda (3/3) 28', 56', 75' | Report | Try: S. Lam 38' m Paia'aua 65' c Leali'ifano 78' c Con: Leali'ifano (2/3) 66', 79'; Pen: Leuila (1/2) 25' |

Stadium de Toulouse, Toulouse
Attendance: 31,794
Referee: Jaco Peyper (South Africa)

8 October 2023
13:00 CEST (UTC+2)

| Japan | 27–39 | Argentina (1 BP) |
| Try: Fakatava 16' c Saitō 38' c Naikabula 65' c Con: Matsuda (3/3) 17', 39', 67'; Pen: Matsuda (1/1) 52'; Drop: Lemeki (1/1) 56' | Report | Try: Chocobares 2' c M. Carreras (3) 28' m, 46' c, 68' c Boffelli 58' c Con: Boffelli (3/4) 2', 47', 60'; Sánchez (1/1) 70'; Pen: Boffelli (1/2) 35'; Sánchez (1/1) 75' |

Stade de la Beaujoire, Nantes
Attendance: 33,624
Referee: Ben O'Keeffe (New Zealand)

== Overall record ==
| Against | Played | Win | Draw | Lost | Win % |
|---|---|---|---|---|---|
| Argentina | 2 | 0 | 0 | 2 | 0 |
| Australia | 2 | 0 | 0 | 2 | 0 |
| Canada | 2 | 0 | 2 | 0 | 0 |
| Chile | 1 | 1 | 0 | 0 | 100 |
| England | 2 | 0 | 0 | 2 | 0 |
| Fiji | 2 | 0 | 0 | 2 | 0 |
| France | 2 | 0 | 0 | 2 | 0 |
| Ireland | 3 | 1 | 0 | 2 | 33.33 |
| New Zealand | 2 | 0 | 0 | 2 | 0 |
| Russia | 1 | 1 | 0 | 0 | 100 |
| Samoa | 4 | 3 | 0 | 1 | 75 |
| Scotland | 3 | 1 | 0 | 2 | 33.33 |
| South Africa | 2 | 1 | 0 | 1 | 50 |
| Tonga | 1 | 0 | 0 | 1 | 0 |
| United States | 3 | 1 | 0 | 2 | 33.33 |
| Wales | 3 | 0 | 0 | 3 | 0 |
| Zimbabwe | 1 | 1 | 0 | 0 | 100 |
| Overall | | | | | |

== Hosting ==
At a special IRB meeting held in Dublin on 28 July 2009, Japan was announced as the host for the 2019 Rugby World Cup.

=== List of planned stadia ===
In addition to the nine venues located in Japan, one venue each from Singapore and Hong Kong have also been proposed to host five matches respectively.

- Nissan Stadium, Yokohama (72,000)
- Nagai Stadium, Osaka (50,000)
- Chichibunomiya Rugby Stadium, Tokyo (27,000)
- Yurtec Stadium Sendai, Sendai (20,000)
- Level-5 Stadium, Fukuoka (23,000)
- Toyota Stadium, Toyota (45,000)
- Sapporo Dome, Sapporo (41,000)
- Home's Stadium, Kobe (34,000)
- Hong Kong Stadium, Hong Kong (40,000)
- Singapore Sports Hub, Singapore (50,000)

Several changes to the venues submitted in the JRFU's original 2009 bid were made. The JRFU's own Chichibunomiya Stadium in Tokyo, suitable for smaller interest games in the capital, was not included in the plan. The JRFU selected the larger and more modern 50,000-seat Nagai multi-purpose stadium as its preferred venue for games in Osaka, though East Osaka City, which had taken over the Hanazono Rugby Stadium from long-time corporate owners Kintetsu in April 2015, submitted a joint bid with Osaka Municipality, intending to refurbish the stadium. Kamaishi, Hamamatsu, Kyoto, Ōita, Nagasaki and Kumamoto were also not part of the JRFU's bid. While the bids included venues from a broad area of Japan, two areas were not involved in hosting: Hokushin'etsu (Hokuriku and Kōshin'etsu regions), which includes the city of Niigata; and the Chūgoku region, which includes Hiroshima and the nearby island of Shikoku. No city in Chūgoku hosted games at the 2002 FIFA World Cup, but Hiroshima did host games in the 2006 FIBA World Championship.

The new National Stadium in Tokyo being constructed for the 2020 Summer Olympics was expected to be the primary venue of the tournament. However, the original plans were scrapped and rebid in 2015 due to criticism over its design and increasing costs. As a consequence, it would no longer be completed in time. The fixtures assigned to the stadium were re-located, with the opening match moved to Ajinomoto Stadium and the final moved to Nissan Stadium in Yokohama.

| Yokohama | Hamamatsu (Fukuroi) | Tokyo (Chōfu) | Nagoya (Toyota City) | Sapporo |
|---|---|---|---|---|
| International Stadium Yokohama | Shizuoka Stadium Ecopa | Tokyo Stadium | City of Toyota Stadium | Sapporo Dome |
| Capacity: 72,327 | Capacity: 50,889 | Capacity: 49,970 | Capacity: 45,000 | Capacity: 41,410 |
| Ōita | Japan at the Rugby World Cup is located in Japan | | | Kobe |
| Oita Stadium | Japan at the Rugby World Cup is located in Japan | | | Kobe Misaki Stadium |
| Capacity: 40,000 | Japan at the Rugby World Cup is located in Japan | | | Capacity: 30,132 |
| Osaka (Higashiosaka) | Kumamoto | Kumagaya | Fukuoka | Kamaishi |
| Hanazono Rugby Stadium | Kumamoto Stadium | Kumagaya Rugby Stadium | Fukuoka Hakatanom ori Stadium | Kamaishi Recovery Memorial Stadium |
| Capacity: 24,100 | Capacity: 32,000 | Capacity: 24,000 | Capacity: 20,049 | Capacity: 16,020 |

=== Typhoon Hagibis and match cancellations ===
On 10 October, World Rugby and the Japan Rugby 2019 Organising Committee announced that, due to the predicted weather caused by Typhoon Hagibis, the Pool B meeting between New Zealand and Italy and the Pool C meeting between England and France had been cancelled. The decisions had been made on safety grounds with considerations on the expected impact the typhoon would have on Tokyo, including likely public transport shutdown or disruption. This was the first ever occasion any Rugby World Cup match had been cancelled. Decision on cancellation of pool games scheduled for 13 October was made on the day of the game, including the match between Japan and Scotland.

On the evening of 12 October Japan Standard Time (JST), World Rugby and the Japan 2019 Organising Committee released a statement that they had advised Namibia and Canada of the possibility of their game being cancelled, with the typhoon predicted to impact Kamaishi. On 13 October, World Rugby and the Japan 2019 Organising Committee announced the cancellation of the Namibia–Canada game in Kamaishi. The decision was made following a level 5 evacuation order in the city on the day of the match following the typhoon. Canada's national team stayed in Kamaishi to help out local residents with their cleanup efforts. The Namibia national team interacted with fans in the campsite Miyako City.

Shortly after the announcement of the cancellation of the Namibia–Canada game, it was confirmed that the matches between Wales and Uruguay and the United States and Tonga would go ahead as scheduled. By noon on 12 October, it was confirmed that the match between Japan and Scotland was unaffected by the typhoon and would take place as scheduled, in front of spectators who had previously feared that they might have missed out with the game played behind closed doors.

In line with tournament rules, the canceled pool matches were declared as drawn, the points being shared two each with no score registered. With these cancellations, France were unable to compete for the top pool position (held by England at the time), with a victory to secure that place. For Italy, however, the cancellation effectively eliminated them from the tournament; a victory against defending champions New Zealand could have seen them qualify for the knock-out stage, dependent on the margin of the win. This also had implications on whether South Africa finished top of their pool or as runners-up, having already confirmed their progression to the quarter-finals.
