= United States at the Rugby World Cup =

The United States national rugby union team has played in all but two Rugby World Cups since the inaugural tournament in 1987. The USA is the strongest national rugby side in North America, and the second strongest in the Americas after the Argentina national rugby team.

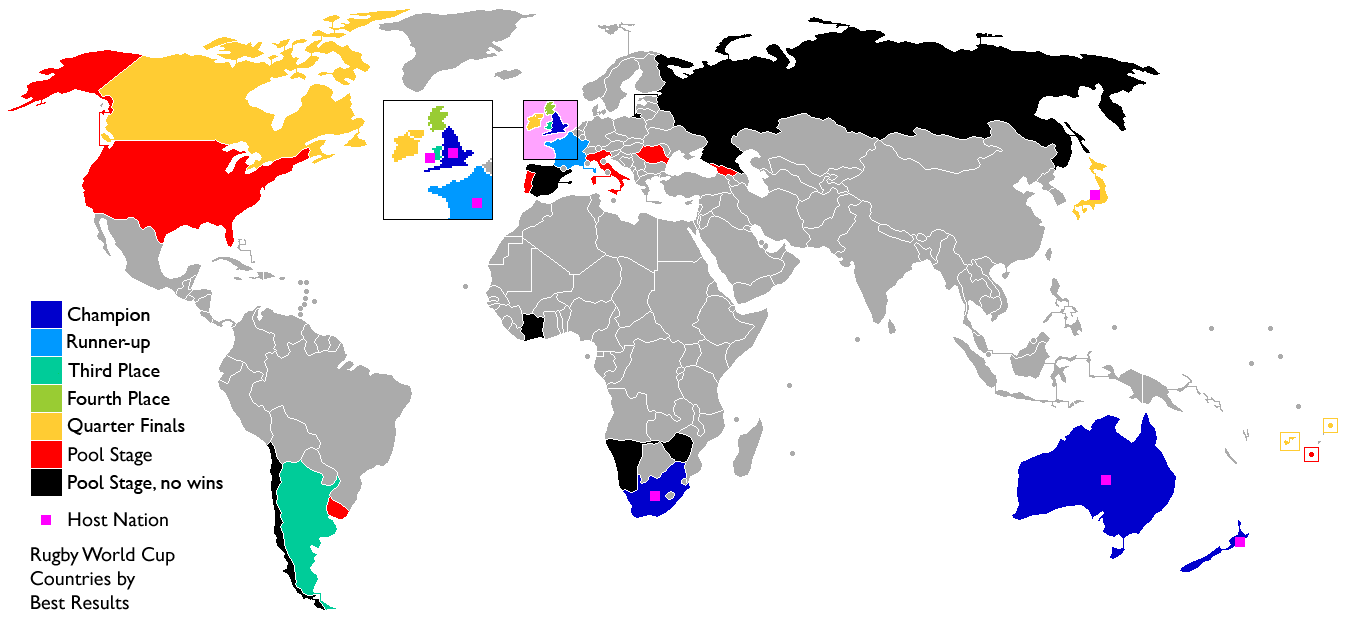
Map of nations best results, excluding nations which unsuccessfully participated in qualifying tournaments.

The U.S. has played in eight World Cups from the inaugural 1987 tournament to the 2019 tournament—all but the 1995 and 2023 World Cups. The team's best result so far has been to win one game—which they accomplished in 1987, 2003, and 2011.

The U.S. is set to host the Rugby World Cup in 2031.

== Summary of results by tournament ==
Rugby World Cup record									Qualification						
Year	Round	Pld	W	D	L	PF	PA	Squad	Pos	Pld	W	D	L	PF	PA
(New Zealand) (Australia) 1987	Pool stage	3	1	0	2	39	99	Squad	Invited						
(England) (France) (Ireland) (Scotland) (Wales) 1991	Pool stage	3	0	0	3	24	113	Squad	3rd	4	1	0	3	29	69
(South Africa) 1995	Did not qualify								P/O	3	1	0	2	93	47
(Wales) 1999	Pool stage	3	0	0	3	52	135	Squad	3rd	3	1	0	2	59	99
(Australia) 2003	Pool stage	4	1	0	3	86	125	Squad	P/O	8	4	0	4	224	165
(France) 2007	Pool stage	4	0	0	4	61	142	Squad	P/O	4	3	0	1	173	76
(New Zealand) 2011	Pool stage	4	1	0	3	38	122	Squad	P/O	4	3	0	1	84	75
(England) 2015	Pool stage	4	0	0	4	50	156	Squad	P/O	4	1	1	2	79	80
(Japan) 2019	Pool stage	4	0	0	4	52	156	Squad	P/O	2	1	1	0	80	44
(France) 2023	Did not qualify								P/O	9	5	1	3	277	189
(Australia) 2027	Qualified								3rd	3	1	0	2	70	95
(United States) 2031	Qualified as Hosts								Automatically qualified						
Total	—	29	3	0	26	402	1048	—	—	44	21	3	20	1171	939
Champions; Runners–up; Third place; Fourth place; Home venue

== Summary of results by opponent ==
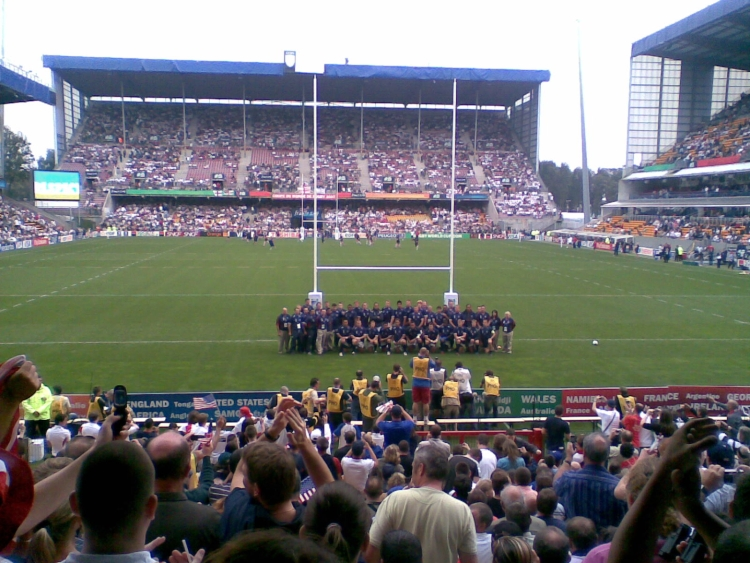
The United States squad ahead of the 2007 Rugby World Cup match with England at Stade Félix-Bollaert.

Against	Played	Won	Lost	Drawn	Win %
New Zealand	1	0	1	0	0
Australia	3	0	3	0	0
South Africa	2	0	2	0	0
England	4	0	4	0	0
France	2	0	2	0	0
Scotland	2	0	2	0	0
Ireland	2	0	2	0	0
Fiji	1	0	1	0	0
Samoa	2	0	2	0	0
Italy	2	0	2	0	0
Tonga	2	0	2	0	0
Romania	1	0	1	0	0
Japan	3	2	1	0	67
Russia	1	1	0	0	100
Argentina	1	0	1	0	0
Total	29	3	26	0	10.3%

Notes:

- Results current through end of 2019 Rugby World Cup.

== Qualifying ==
The U.S. has qualified for every World Cup, except for the 1995 and 2023 tournaments.

RWC	Record (Note: Format is Win-Loss, or in the case of draws, Win-Loss-Draw.)	Defeated	Lost to	Qualifying method
1987	—			No qualifying competition; all 16 participating nations were invited.
1991	1–3	Canada (14–12)	Argentina (6–13, 6–23); Canada (3–21)	Finished third of three teams in Americas qualifying.
1995	1–2	Bermuda (60–3)	Argentina (22–28, 11–16)	Failed to qualify: Lost to Argentina 44–33 in a two-game series.
1999	1–2	Uruguay (21–16)	Argentina (24–52); Canada (14–31)	Finished third in Americas qualifying by defeating Uruguay 21–16.
2003	2–4	Uruguay (28–24); Chile (35–22)	Canada (9–26, 13–36); Chile (13–21); Uruguay (9–10)	Finished ahead of Chile to qualify for the repechage; Defeated Spain 120–26 in a two-game series in the repechage.
2007	3–1	Uruguay (42–13, 33–7); Barbados (91–0)	Canada (7–56)	Defeated Uruguay 75–20 in a two-game series.
2011	3–1	Uruguay (27–22, 27–6); Canada (12–6)	Canada (18–41)	Defeated Uruguay 54–28 in a two-game series.
2015	1–2–1	Uruguay (32–13)	Canada (9–27, 11–13)	Defeated Uruguay 59–40 in a two-game series.
2019	1–0–1	Canada (52–16)		Defeated Canada 80–44 in a two-game series.
2023	5–3–1			Failed to qualify: Finished second in cross-regional playoff.
2027	1–2	Samoa (29–13)	Canada (34–20); Japan (21–47)	Defeated Samoa 29–13 in 2025 Pacific Nations Cup Fifth-place play-off

Results by Opponent
Opponent	Played	Won	Lost	Percent
Canada	11	2	9	18.18%
Uruguay	8	7	1	87.5%
Argentina	5	0	5	0%
Chile	2	1	1	50%
Japan	1	0	1	0%
Samoa	1	1	0	100%

== Rugby World Cup hosting ==
So far the USA has not hosted any Rugby World Cup games. However, the United States will host the 2031 Rugby World Cup, it will mark the first Rugby World Cup ever held in the Americas.

== Team RWC records ==
- Most points scored in a single tournament: 86 (2003)
- Most points scored in a single match: 39 (39–26 vs. Japan in 2003)
- Largest margin of victory: 13 (39–26 vs. Japan in 2003)

== Player RWC records ==
=== Career ===
Matches
No.	Player	Matches
1	Mike MacDonald	11
1	Blaine Scully	11
1	Chris Wyles	11
4	Taku Ngwenya	10
4	Alec Parker	10

Updated: 2019.

Tackles
No.	Player	Tackles
1	Louis Stanfill	62
2	Phil Thiel	56
3	Alec Parker	55
4	Mike MacDonald	47
5	Mike Hercus	45

Updated: 2019.

Points
No.	Player	Points
1	Mike Hercus	77
2	AJ MacGinty	42
3	Chris Wyles	33
4	Kevin Dalzell	29
5	Ray Nelson	28

Updated: 2019.

=== Tries scored ===
The following table shows all U.S. players that have scored two or more tries in their World Cup career, plus all active players who have scored at least one World Cup try.

Player	Tries	’87	’91	’95*	’99	’03	’07	’11	’15	’19
Chris Wyles	4						1	1	2	
Ray Nelson	3	2	1							
Taku Ngwenya	3						2		1	
Kort Schubert	3					3				
Mike Hercus	2					2				
Mike Purcell	2	2								
Blaine Scully	2									2
Louis Stanfill	2						2			
Mike Te'o	2									2
Riaan van Zyl	2					2				
Bryce Campbell	1									1
Tony Lamborn	1									1
Titi Lamositele	1								1	
Paul Lasike	1									1

Note: The U.S. failed to qualify for the 1995 Rugby World Cup.

- Most penalties scored: Mike Hercus, 15 (2003 & 2007)

=== Single tournament ===
- Most points in a single tournament: Mike Hercus, 51 (2003)
- Most tries in a single tournament: Kort Schubert, 3 (2003)

== Individual tournaments: 1987 to present ==
=== 1987 Rugby World Cup ===
Team	Pld	W	D	L	PF	PA	PD	T	Pts	Qualification
Australia	3	3	0	0	108	41	+67	18	6	Knockout stage
England	3	2	0	1	100	32	+68	15	4	Knockout stage
United States	3	1	0	2	39	99	−60	5	2	
Japan	3	0	0	3	48	123	−75	7	0	

24 May 1987

Japan	18–21	United States
Try: Taumoefolau (2); Yoshinaga; Pen: Yoshinaga; Kutsuki	Report	Try: Nelson; Purcell; Lambert; Con: Nelson (3); Pen: Nelson

Ballymore, Brisbane
Attendance: 4,000
Referee: Guy Maurette (France)

31 May 1987

Australia	47–12	United States
Try: Leeds (2) 43'; Penalty try Campese; Smith 24'; Slack 40'; Papworth; Codey; Con: Lynagh (6) 25', 41'; Pen: Lynagh 2'	Report	Try: Nelson 53'; Con: Nelson 54'; Pen: Nelson 32'; Drop: Horton 75'

Ballymore, Brisbane
Attendance: 10,855
Referee: Brian Anderson (Scotland)

3 June 1987

England	34–6	United States
Try: Winterbottom (2); Harrison; Dooley; Con: Webb (3); Pen: Webb (4)	Report	Try: Purcell; Con: Nelson

Concord Oval, Sydney
Attendance: 8,785
Referee: Kerry Fitzgerald (Australia)

=== 1991 Rugby World Cup ===
Team	Pld	W	D	L	PF	PA	PD	Pts
New Zealand	3	3	0	0	95	39	+56	6
England	3	2	0	1	85	33	+52	4
Italy	3	1	0	2	57	76	−19	2
United States	3	0	0	3	24	113	−89	0

1991-10-05

Italy	30–9	United States
Tries: Barba, Francescato, Vaccari, Gaetaniello; Con: Dominguez (4); Pen: Dominguez (2)		Tries: Swords; Con: Williams; Pen: Williams

Cross Green, Otley
Referee: Owen Doyle (Ireland)

1991-10-08

New Zealand	46–6	United States
Tries: Wright (3), Earl, Purvis, Timu, Tuigamala, Innes; Con: Preston (4); Pen: Preston (2)		Pen: Williams (2)

Kingsholm, Gloucester
Attendance: 12,000
Referee: Efraim Sklar (Argentina)

1991-10-11

England	37–9	United States
Tries: Underwood (2), Carling, Skinner, Heslop; Con: Hodgkinson (4); Pen: Hodgkinson (3)		Tries: Nelson; Con: Williams; Pen: Williams

Twickenham, London
Referee: Les Peard (Wales)

=== 1995 Rugby World Cup ===
The Americas were allotted only two teams for the 1995 tournament. Canada automatically qualified, by virtue of reaching the quarterfinals of the 1991 tournament. Only 1 place remained for the Americas qualifying, to be decided by the winner of the home-and-away series between the US and Argentina (the winner of the Americas South bracket) in 1994. In that series, the US lost their home match 22–28, and also lost their away match 11–16. With the 2–0 record and 44-33 aggregate score, Argentina secured the final qualifying spot for the Americas.

=== 1999 Rugby World Cup ===
Team	Pld	W	D	L	PF	PA	PD	Pts
Australia	3	3	0	0	135	31	+104	9
Ireland	3	2	0	1	100	45	+55	7
Romania	3	1	0	2	50	126	−76	5
United States	3	0	0	3	52	135	−83	3

1999-10-02

Ireland	53–8	United States
Tries: Keith Wood (4), Brian O'Driscoll, Justin Bishop, Penalty try Con: David Humphreys (4); Eric Elwood (2); Pen: David Humphreys (2)	Report	Tries: Kevin Dalzell; Pen: Kevin Dalzell

Lansdowne Road, Dublin
Attendance: 30,000
Referee: Joel Dume (France)

1999-10-09

United States	25–27	Romania
Tries: Kurt Shuman, Brian Hightower, Dan Lyle; Con: Kevin Dalzell (2); Pen: Kevin Dalzell (2)		Tries: Alin Petrache, Gheorghe Solomie, Tudor Constantin; Con: Petre Mitu (2); Pen: Petre Mitu

Lansdowne Road, Dublin
Referee: Jim Fleming (Scotland)

1999-10-14

Australia	55–19	United States
Tries: Scott Staniforth (2), Chris Latham, Chris Whitaker, Michael Foley, Matthew Burke, Stephen Larkham, Tiaan Straaus; Con: Matthew Burke (5), Joe Roff; Pen: Matthew Burke		Tries: Juan Grobler; Con: Kevin Dalzell; Pen: Kevin Dalzell (4)

Thomond Park, Limerick
Referee: Andre Watson (South Africa)

=== 2003 Rugby World Cup ===
Team	Pld	W	D	L	PF	PA	PD	BP	Pts	Qualification
France	4	4	0	0	204	70	+134	4	20	Quarter-finals
Scotland	4	3	0	1	102	97	+5	2	14	Quarter-finals
Fiji	4	2	0	2	98	114	−16	2	10	
United States	4	1	0	3	86	125	−39	2	6	
Japan	4	0	0	4	79	163	−84	0	0	

2003-10-15

Fiji	19–18	United States
Tries: Naevo; Con: Little; Pen: Little (4)		Tries: van Zyl, Schubert; Con: Hercus; Pen: Hercus (2)

Suncorp Stadium, Brisbane
Attendance: 30,990
Referee: Joël Jutge (France)

2003-10-20

Scotland	39–15	United States
Tries: Danielli (2), Kerr, Townsend, Paterson; Con: Paterson (4); Pen: Paterson (2)		Pen: Hercus (5)

Suncorp Stadium, Brisbane
Attendance: 46,796
Referee: Jonathan Kaplan (South Africa)

2003-10-27

Japan	26–39	United States
Tries: Kurihara, Ohata; Con: Kurihara (2); Pen: Kurihara (4)		Tries: Hercus, Eloff, Schubert, van Zyl, Khasigian; Con: Hercus (4); Pen: Hercus (2)

Bluetongue Central Coast Stadium, Gosford
Attendance: 19,653
Referee: Steve Walsh (New Zealand)

2003-10-31

France	41–14	United States
Tries: Liebenberg (3), Poux, Bru; Con: Merceron (2); Pen: Merceron (3); Drop: Yachvili		Tries: Hercus, Schubert; Con: Hercus (2)

WIN Stadium, Wollongong
Attendance: 17,833
Referee: Paul Honiss (New Zealand)

Mike Hercus was the leading points scorer for the United States - and 7th leading scorer among all players - with 51 points (2 tries, 9 penalties, 7 conversions).

=== 2007 Rugby World Cup ===
Pos	Team	Pld	W	D	L	PF	PA	PD	B	Pts	Qualification
1	South Africa	4	4	0	0	189	47	+142	3	19	Advanced to the quarter-finals and qualified for the 2011 Rugby World Cup
2	England	4	3	0	1	108	88	+20	2	14	Advanced to the quarter-finals and qualified for the 2011 Rugby World Cup
3	Tonga	4	2	0	2	89	96	−7	1	9	Eliminated, automatic qualification for 2011 Rugby World Cup
4	Samoa	4	1	0	3	69	143	−74	1	5	
5	United States	4	0	0	4	61	142	−81	1	1	

8 September 2007
18:00

England	28–10	United States
Tries: Robinson 35' m Barkley 40+' c Rees 49' c Con: Barkley (2/3); Pen: Barkley (3/3) 7', 22', 31'	Report	Tries: Moeakiola 74' c Con: Hercus (1/1); Pen: Hercus (1/1) 9'

Stade Félix Bollaert, Lens
Attendance: 36,755
Referee: Jonathan Kaplan (South Africa)

12 September 2007
14:00

United States	15 – 25	Tonga
Tries: MacDonald 47' m Stanfill 67' c Con: Hercus (1/2); Pen: Hercus (1/2) 33'	Report	Tries: Maka 2' c Vaka 59' m Vaki 70' c Con: Hola (2/3); Pen: Hola (2/2) 7', 26'

Stade de la Mosson, Montpellier
Attendance: 25,000
Referee: Stuart Dickinson (Australia)

26 September 2007
20:00

Samoa	25–21	United States
Tries: Fa'atau 5' m Tuilagi 9' c Thompson 37' c Con: Crichton (2/3); Pen: Crichton (2/2) 30', 72'	Report	Tries: Ngwenya 53' c Stanfill 79' m Con: Hercus (1/2); Pen: Hercus (3/4) 32', 65', 75'

Stade Geoffroy-Guichard, Saint-Étienne
Attendance: 34,124
Referee: Wayne Barnes (England)

30 September 2007
20:00

South Africa	64–15	United States
Tries: Burger 10' c Steyn 28' c Habana (2) 35' c, 42' m van der Linde 48' c du Preez 54' c Fourie (2) 64' c, 73' c Smith 77' c Con: Montgomery (6/7); James (2/2); Pen: Montgomery (1/1) 17'	Report	Tries: Ngwenya 39' c Wyles 51' m Con: Hercus (1/2); Pen: Hercus (1/1) 20'

Stade de la Mosson, Montpellier
Attendance: 28,750
Referee: Tony Spreadbury (England)

2007 Squad:

Forwards: Blake Burdette, Owen Lentz, Mike MacDonald, Matekitonga Moeakiola, Chris Osentowski, Jonathan Vitale, Luke Gross, Mike Mangan, Hayden Mexted, Alec Parker, Mark Aylor, Inaki Basauri, Todd Clever, Fifita Mounga, Louis Stanfill, Henry Bloomfield, Dan Payne

Backs: Chad Erskine, Mike Petri, Mike Hercus (C), Nese Malifa, Philip Eloff, Vahafolau Esikia, Thretton Palamo, Albert Tuipulotu, Paul Emerick, Takudzwa Ngwenya, Salesi Sika, Francois Viljoen, Chris Wyles

Head Coach: Peter Thorburn

In the 2007 Rugby World Cup, the US joined England, Samoa, South Africa and Tonga in Pool A. The Eagles, ranked 13th in the world standings, lost all 4 games in Pool A, scoring 1 bonus point in the game against Samoa. Coached by New Zealander Peter Thorburn, the Eagles started off with tough match against the defending world champions England, losing 28–10. The US was then beaten by Tonga 25–15, lost to Samoa 25 – 21, and lost their final match to highly favored South Africa 64 – 15. The Eagles, however, had a major highlight in the South Africa match. After an interception and a pair of passes, Takudzwa Ngwenya sped down the sideline and outran Bryan Habana, arguably the fastest man in world rugby, to score a try that received Try of the Year honors at the 2007 IRB Awards.

=== 2011 Rugby World Cup ===
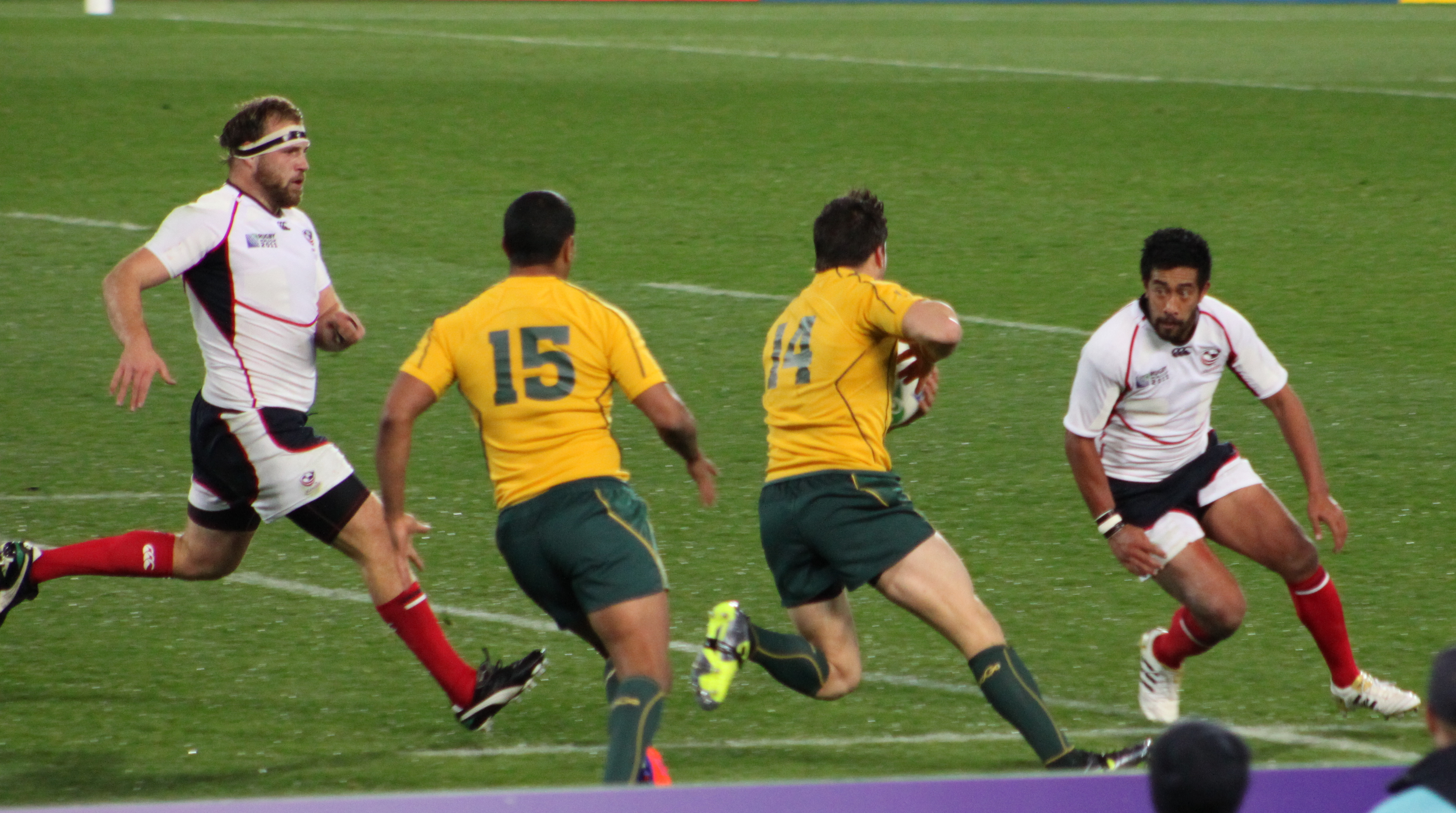
Australia vs USA at the Regional Stadium, Wellington. Australia won 67–5.

Pos	Team	Pld	W	D	L	PF	PA	PD	T	B	Pts	Qualification
1	Ireland	4	4	0	0	135	34	+101	15	1	17	Advanced to the quarter-finals and qualified for the 2015 Rugby World Cup
2	Australia	4	3	0	1	173	48	+125	25	3	15	Advanced to the quarter-finals and qualified for the 2015 Rugby World Cup
3	Italy	4	2	0	2	92	95	−3	13	2	10	Eliminated but qualified for 2015 Rugby World Cup
4	United States	4	1	0	3	38	122	−84	4	0	4	
5	Russia	4	0	0	4	57	196	−139	8	1	1	

11 September 2011	Ireland	22–10	United States	Stadium Taranaki, New Plymouth
15 September 2011	Russia	6–13	United States	Stadium Taranaki, New Plymouth
23 September 2011	Australia	67–5	United States	Regional Stadium, Wellington
27 September 2011	Italy	27–10	United States	Trafalgar Park, Nelson

Chris Wyles was the USA's leading scorer of the 2011 tournament with 18 points (1 try, 3 penalties, 2 conversions).

Mike Petri, Paul Emerick, and JJ Gagiano each scored 5 points (1 try) for the US.

30 Man Squad:

- Hooker: Chris Biller, Phil Thiel, Brian McClenahan
- Prop: Mike MacDonald, Mate Moeakiola, Shawn Pittman, Eric Fry
- Lock: Hayden Smith, John van der Giessen
- Loose: Todd Clever (c), Louis Stanfill, Nic Johnson, Scott LaValla, Patrick Danahy, JJ Gagiano, Inaki Basauri
- Scrumhalf: Mike Petri, Tim Usasz
- Flyhalf: Roland Suniula, Nese Malifa
- Center: Andrew Suniula, Paul Emerick, Tai Enosa, Junior Sifa
- Wing: Takudzwa Ngwyenya, James Paterson, Kevin Swiryn, Colin Hawley
- Fullback: Chris Wyles, Blaine Scully

The Eagles showed tremendous fight and power in their World Cup opening match against Ireland emotionally charged as the game coincided with the 10th anniversary of the September 11 attacks. The Irish came out strong but the Eagles were stiff in defense. The Irish suffered from poor goal kicking and were only able to gain a 3–0 lead before finally scoring their first try at the 39' mark to take a 10-0 half-time lead. The Irish came out more ready to play in the second half but still ran into stiff Eagles defense. Ultimately the Irish scored two more tries to give a final tally of 22 points. The Eagles succeeded in frustrating Irish expectations to gain a bonus point with a full strength squad and managed to post 10 points led by an interception try on full-time by Paul Emerick.

The Eagles came into the World Cup with their measuring mark for success as being a win over Russia. The Eagles did not disappoint. Russia leaped out to an early 3–0 lead after a penalty goal from inside the 22 set up by a block on a Mike Petri box kick. The Americans took a 10–3 lead into the half after a break by Andrew Suniula set up a try for Mike Petri. The kicking duty fell upon Chris Wyles who capitalized on his first kick, a deep strike in poor conditions from the 10 meter line. Wyles was also successful on a conversion and with his last attempt at goal. He did, however, miss 3 kicks at goal and a drop goal. Russia would land once more on the board to snatch a bonus point from the match but fell to the final tally of USA 13–6 Russia. Both Wyles and Mike MacDonald had amazing matches as McDonald scooped up the man of the match accolades. The Eagles were absolutely dominant at the lineout winning 7 of Russia's 13 throws and winning all 12 of their own throws. The win elevated the Eagles back up to 17th in the IRB rankings and dropped Russia one spot to 21st.

For their third match the Eagles trotted out a squad with 14 changes from the one that met Russia, ensuring that each player on the roster received a cap in the tournament. Australia got on the board early with tries at the 7- and 10-minute marks, but the Eagles answered with a JJ Gagiano try at the 22nd minute that cut the deficit to 10–5. Australia quickly responded with two more tries to take a 22–5 lead into the half along with clinching a bonus point. In the second half the Wallabies jumped on the Eagles leading to the final result of 67–5. This was the worst defeat a US team has ever suffered to Australia.

The final match saw the Eagles playing for a 3rd-place finish in Pool C and an automatic qualification into the 2015 Rugby World Cup. The Eagles faced Italy (the Azzurri) and the scoring began early by the Azzurri, but the Eagles struck back with a Chris Wyles try and conversion to level the match 7-7. The Italians struck quickly with their second try, and scored their third try on the stroke of halftime to lead 20–10 at the half. Italy focused their second-half efforts on scoring a fourth try and the bonus point. The US second-half defense held for 25 minutes, but after tremendous pressure by the Italian scrum - which Italy dominated all match - the Azzurri got their fourth try and the bonus point in the 65th minute. That try and conversion were the only points for the Azzurri in the second half. The defeat marked the end of the 2011 Rugby World Cup and the 2011 season for the Eagles.

=== 2015 Rugby World Cup ===
U.S. summer preparations for the World Cup included four matches at the 2015 Pacific Nations Cup plus two additional World Cup warm-up matches. The U.S. earned three wins and three losses over these matches, with wins against Canada (twice) and Japan.

Pos	Team	Pld	W	D	L	PF	PA	PD	T	B	Pts	Qualification
1	South Africa	4	3	0	1	176	56	+120	23	4	16	Advanced to the quarter-finals and qualified for the 2019 Rugby World Cup
2	Scotland	4	3	0	1	136	93	+43	14	2	14	Advanced to the quarter-finals and qualified for the 2019 Rugby World Cup
3	Japan	4	3	0	1	98	100	−2	9	0	12	Eliminated but qualified for 2019 Rugby World Cup
4	Samoa	4	1	0	3	69	124	−55	7	2	6	
5	United States	4	0	0	4	50	156	−106	5	0	0	

20 September 2015	Samoa	25–16	United States	Brighton Community Stadium, Brighton
27 September 2015	Scotland	39–16	United States	Elland Road, Leeds
7 October 2015	South Africa	64–0	United States	Olympic Stadium, London
11 October 2015	United States	18–28	Japan	Kingsholm, Gloucester

World Rugby Rankings
Rankings 10–20 as of 7 September 2015
Rank	Change*	Team	Points
10	Steady	Scotland	75.88
11	Steady	Tonga	75.69
12	Steady	Samoa	75.14
13	▲1	Japan	72.06
14	▲1	Italy	70.53
15	▲1	United States	70.36
16	▼3	Georgia	69.36
17	Steady	Romania	66.28
18	Steady	Canada	65.17
19	Steady	Uruguay	62.11
20	Steady	Namibia	61.85
The U.S. reached as high as 15th in the rankings in the buildup to the 2015 World Cup.

At the World Cup, the U.S. lost its first match against Samoa 16–25. The Eagles suffered from ill discipline, committing 14 penalties (compared to 7 for Samoa); and from poor tackling, with a 79% tackle success rate and 29 missed tackles, (compared to Samoa's 86% tackle rate and 19 missed tackles).

The team entered World Cup play with the highest hopes in years. The pool draw placed the Eagles alongside Japan, a team they had beaten earlier in the summer, Samoa, a team they've played well in the past, and Scotland. Scotland, though a tier 1 nation, had struggled in recent years. The last team was South Africa, a team that lost its first match of the World Cup to Japan. In their opening match against Samoa, the United States trailed 14–8 at the half, and ultimately fell 25–16, after finding tremendous difficulties at the lineout and in the scrum.

Carrying a tough 0–1 start into the team's second match, the Eagles made history by claiming a first ever halftime lead over a tier 1 nation (13–6), on the back of a strong showing in the scrum. The second half was less kind, as Scotland quickly overcame the deficit and pushed the final score well out of reach: Scotland 39, USA 16.

With a winless campaign becoming a real possibility, the coaching staff chose a roster that drastically differed from the starters in the first two matches. Against South Africa, the Eagles struggled early and were dominated in the scrum, but kept the match close at the break with South Africa holding a 14-point lead. In the second half, the Springboks blew the match open, running the match to 64–0. The defeat is the fifth largest in USA Rugby history and the largest in a World Cup.

2015 RWC: U.S. statistical leaders
Category	Player	Total	Rank
Carries	Samu Manoa	57	2nd
Carries over the gain line	Samu Manoa	26	4th
Turnovers made	Andrew Durutalo	6	8th
Penalties scored	AJ MacGinty	7	9th
Points scored	AJ MacGinty	25	17th
Tackles made	Alastair McFarland	37	—

Source: World Rugby Rank is as of the end of the pool stages, and does not include the knockout rounds.

=== 2019 Rugby World Cup ===
26 September 2019
19:45 JST (UTC+09)

(1 BP) England	45–7	United States
Try: Ford 6' c Vunipola 25' c Cowan-Dickie 33' m Cokanasiga (2) 48' m, 76' c McConnochie 58' c Ludlam 67' c Con: Ford (5/7) 7', 26', 60', 68', 77'	Report	Try: Campbell 80+1' c Con: MacGinty (1/1) 80+2'

Kobe Misaki Stadium, Kobe
Attendance: 27,194
Referee: Nic Berry (Australia)

2 October 2019
16:45 JST (UTC+09)

(1 BP) France	33–9	United States
Try: Huget 6' c Raka 24' m Fickou 67' c Serin 70' c Poirot 79' c Con: Ramos (1/2) 8'; Lopez (3/3) 68', 71', 80'+1	Report	Pen: MacGinty (3/3) 19', 31', 65'

Fukuoka Hakatanomori Stadium, Fukuoka
Attendance: 17,660
Referee: Ben O'Keeffe (New Zealand)

9 October 2019
13:45 JST (UTC+09)

(1 BP) Argentina	47-17	United States

Kumagaya Rugby Stadium, Kumagaya
Referee: Paul Williams (New Zealand)

13 October 2019
14:45 JST (UTC+09)

United States	19-31	Tonga

Hanazono Rugby Stadium, Higashiōsaka
Referee: Nigel Owens (Wales)

=== 2023 Rugby World Cup ===
The United States finished second to Portugal in the cross-regional playoff.

== See also ==
- Davies, Gerald (2004) The History of the Rugby World Cup, Sanctuary Publishing Ltd, (ISBN 1-86074-602-0)
- Farr-Jones, Nick, (2003). Story of the Rugby World Cup, Australian Post Corporation, (ISBN 0-642-36811-2)
