= 2003 Rugby World Cup =

5th Rugby World Cup

Tournament details
- Host nation: Australia
- Venue: 11 (in 10 host cities)
- Dates: 10 October – 22 November (44 days)
- No. of nations: 20 (80 qualifying)

Final positions
- Champions: England (1st title)
- Runner-up: Australia
- Third place: New Zealand

Tournament statistics
- Matches played: 48
- Attendance: 1,838,847 (38,309 per match)
- Top scorer(s): (England) Jonny Wilkinson (113)
- Most tries: (New Zealand) Doug Howlett (New Zealand) Mils Muliaina (7 tries each)

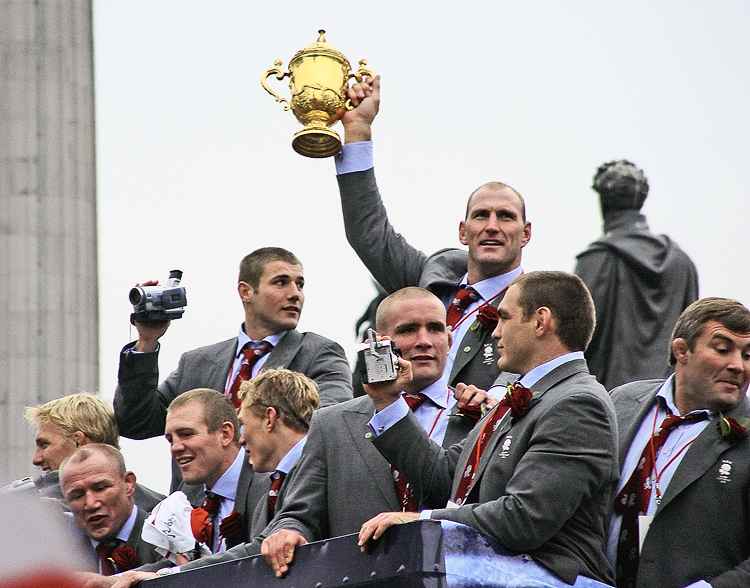
England 2003 World Cup winners

The 2003 Rugby World Cup was the fifth Rugby World Cup and was won by England. Originally planned to be co-hosted by Australia and New Zealand, all games were shifted to Australia following a contractual dispute over ground signage rights between the New Zealand Rugby Union and Rugby World Cup Limited. The pre-event favourites were England, regarded by many at the time as the best team in the world. New Zealand, France, South Africa and defending champions Australia were also expected to make strong showings, with New Zealand being second favourites after victory in the southern-hemisphere Tri-Nations championship.

The tournament began with host nation Australia defeating Argentina 24–8 at Stadium Australia in Sydney. Australia went on to defeat New Zealand 22–10 in the semi-final, to play England in the final. Along with a try to Jason Robinson, Jonny Wilkinson kicked four penalties and then a drop-goal in extra time to win the game 20–17 for England, who became the first northern hemisphere team to win the Webb Ellis Cup and the only one as of 2025 (with their only title).

== Qualifying ==
The following 20 teams, shown by region, qualified for the 2003 Rugby World Cup. Of the 20 teams, eight of those places were automatically filled by the teams that reached the quarter-final stages in 1999, including hosts and world champions Australia and did not have to play any qualification matches. A record 81 nations from five continents were involved in the qualification process designed to fill the remaining 12 spots, which began on 23 September 2000.

Africa	Americas	Europe	Oceania/Asia
Namibia (Africa); South Africa	Argentina; Canada (Americas 1); United States (Repechage 1); Uruguay (Americas 2)	England; France; Ireland (Europe 1); Italy (Europe 2); Romania (Europe 3); Scotland; Georgia (Europe 4); Wales	Australia; Fiji (Oceania 1); New Zealand; Samoa (Oceania 2); Tonga (Repechage 2); Japan (Asia)

== Host ==
Hosting rights to the tournament were initially awarded to both Australia and New Zealand; Australia would serve as the primary host, staging 25 of the 48 matches, while the other 23 would be played in New Zealand. Concerns were expressed in January 2001 that Australia might have been stripped of hosting rights after the International Rugby Board (IRB) removed official status from the 2001 Brisbane Sevens in response to the Australian government denying entry visas to the Fiji team; despite this, the IRB confirmed that Australia was still confirmed as host nation.

In March 2002, the Australian Rugby Union withdrew its offer to allow New Zealand to co-host the tournament after New Zealand Rugby failed to return the sub-host agreement by the deadline of 04:00 GMT on 8 March 2002. The New Zealand governing body had returned the documents, but with substantial changes relating to signage inside stadiums. New Zealand Rugby had intended for the annual National Provincial Championship to take place during the World Cup, and insisted on being able to honour its agreement with local sponsors, but this was not acceptable to the IRB. The ARU was then given 21 days to come up with alternative arrangements. Australia's new plans were ratified at an IRB meeting on 18 April 2003, confirming them as sole hosts of the tournament. The IRB was criticised from some quarters for its decision to strip New Zealand of the World Cup, and speaking to BBC Sport, former New Zealand number 8 Zinzan Brooke called on his former team to threaten a boycott of tournament. New Zealand Prime Minister Helen Clark said the IRB and the ARU had not given enough time to find a solution; however, the head of the ARU, John O'Neill, said he feared Australia could lose the World Cup entirely as a result of the disagreement.

== Venues ==
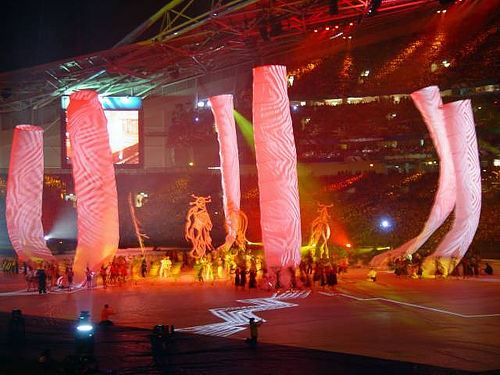
The Opening Ceremony at Stadium Australia

The overall stadium capacity was 421,311 across 11 venues. This was a reduction from the 1999 Rugby World Cup in Wales (with games also held in England, France, Ireland, Northern Ireland and Scotland) which had a total capacity of 654,677 across 18 venues.

The Adelaide Oval underwent a AU$20 million redevelopment for the 2003 Rugby World Cup, financed entirely by the South Australian Cricket Association, with two new grandstands built adjacent to the Victor Richardson Gates. Suncorp Stadium in Brisbane (formerly Lang Park) was a new A$280 million venue designed specifically for rugby league, rugby union and soccer, and was opened just prior to the start of the 2003 World Cup with a capacity of 52,500, some 12,000 more than the old Lang Park could hold. The Central Coast Stadium was also a newly built rectangular venue built for union, league and soccer. It was built on the site of the old Grahame Park ground and was opened in February 2000 at a cost of A$30 million.

The Sydney Football Stadium was one of two venues in Sydney that were used for football during the 2000 Olympic Games. The other venue in Sydney was Stadium Australia, which was the centrepiece of the 2000 Olympic Games. It was built as the main stadium of the 2000 Olympics at a cost of $690 million and with a capacity of 83,500 was the biggest stadium used in the 2003 World Cup (the stadium had an original capacity of 110,000 before undergoing a post-Olympics redevelopment from 2001 to 2003). The only stadium with a retractable roof used was the Docklands Stadium in Melbourne. Although the Docklands Stadium has movable seating which brings four sections of the lower bowl forward by 18 metres to create a more rectangular surround for the pitch, this was not used during the World Cup as it reduces the seating capacity of the stadium by approximately 3,500.

Sydney		Melbourne	Brisbane
Stadium Australia	Sydney Football Stadium	Docklands Stadium	Lang Park
Capacity: 83,500	Capacity: 42,500	Capacity: 56,347	Capacity: 52,500
Perth			Adelaide
Subiaco Oval			Adelaide Oval
Capacity: 42,922	2003 Rugby World Cup (Australia)		Capacity: 33,597
Townsville	2003 Rugby World Cup (Australia)		Canberra
Willows Sports Complex	2003 Rugby World Cup (Australia)		Canberra Stadium
Capacity: 26,500	2003 Rugby World Cup (Australia)		Capacity: 25,011
Gosford		Launceston	Wollongong
Central Coast Stadium		York Park	Wollongong Showground
Capacity: 20,059		Capacity: 19,891	Capacity: 18,484

== Referees ==
- (Argentina) Pablo De Luca
- (Australia) Andrew Cole
- (Australia) Stuart Dickinson
- (Australia) Scott Young
- (Australia) Peter Marshall
- (England) Chris White
- (England) Tony Spreadbury
- (France) Joël Jutge
- (Ireland) Alain Rolland
- (Ireland) David McHugh
- (New Zealand) Paul Honiss
- (New Zealand) Paddy O'Brien
- (New Zealand) Steve Walsh
- (South Africa) Jonathan Kaplan
- (South Africa) André Watson
- (Wales) Nigel Williams

Touch judges and television match officials

- (France) Joël Dumé
- (Ireland) Donal Courtney
- (Ireland) Alan Lewis
- (Italy) Giulio de Santis
- (New Zealand) Kelvin Deaker
- (Scotland) Iain Ramage
- (South Africa) Mark Lawrence
- (Wales) Nigel Whitehouse

== Pools and format ==
Pool A	Pool B	Pool C	Pool D
Australia; Ireland; Argentina; Namibia; Romania	France; United States; Japan; Fiji; Scotland	South Africa; England; Samoa; Georgia; Uruguay	New Zealand; Wales; Italy; Canada; Tonga

Following criticism of the complex format used in the 1999 Rugby World Cup a new simpler format was introduced and the twenty teams were divided into four pools of five nations, with the top two in each pool moving on to the knock-out quarter-final stage. With forty matches to be played in the pool stage on top of the knock-out matches would make the event the largest Rugby World Cup tournament to be played to date. For the first time, a bonus point system was implemented in pool play. This system is identical to that long used in Southern Hemisphere tournaments, and was soon adopted in most European competitions (though not in the Six Nations until 2017):

- 4 points for a win
- 2 points for a draw
- 0 points for a loss (before possible bonus points)
- 1 bonus point for scoring 4 or more tries, or a loss by 7 points or fewer

A total of 48 matches (40 pool stage and eight knock-out) were played throughout the tournament over 42 days from 10 October to 22 November 2003.

== Summary ==
=== Pool stage ===
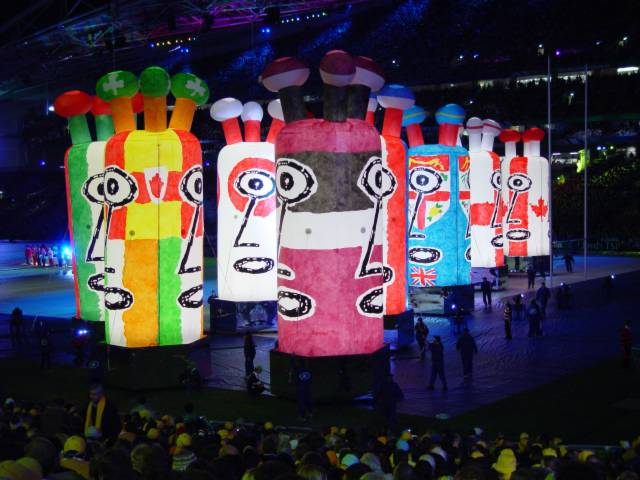
Stadium Australia before the 2003 Rugby World Cup opening game between Australia and Argentina

The Australian media criticised the competition early in the tournament as the smaller nations were crushed by the rugby superpowers by 60 points or more, in particular a 142–0 victory by the host nation over Namibia, the largest winning margin in Rugby World Cup history. However, some of these smaller, third-tier nations, such as Japan, acquitted themselves well in their opening matches. The South Pacific island countries of Fiji, Tonga and Samoa were reported as being handicapped by several of their foreign-based key players being warned by their clubs that their contracts would not be renewed if they played in the competition.

The pool stage of the competition played out largely as expected, with some tension as to whether some of the "developing" nations would overtake some of the weaker major countries for the second quarter-final qualification place in each pool – in Pool A, Argentina lost to Ireland by only one point, when a victory would have carried them into the quarter-finals in Ireland's place; in Pool B, Fiji narrowly missed out on a quarter-final berth, having led Scotland 20–15 with five minutes to go in their deciding match, only for a yellow card to lock Apenisa Naevo to allow Scotland to snatch victory from the jaws of defeat with a late converted try; in Pool D, Italy, despite missing the knockout stage, put up a good performance with two victories. In Pool C, Samoa gave England a fright with an adventurous approach that allowed them to take an early lead, but England overcame the early deficit and eventually won. This match was marked by controversy, as England technically fielded 16 players for 30 seconds during the game when Dan Luger came onto the pitch in substitution for Mike Tindall, who was receiving treatment for an injury but still on the pitch. England were fined £10,000 as a result.

The big clashes ran mainly to form. South Africa came through the pool in second place, after they lost to England, which meant a quarter-final against New Zealand. Australia, however, only beat Ireland by one point to top their pool, while Wales pushed the All Blacks to the wire in arguably the most entertaining game of the entire tournament; adopting a hyper-attacking style of play, they led 37–33 with just 20 minutes left, but New Zealand eventually proved too much in the 12-try thriller. France meanwhile routed Scotland to set up a quarter-final against Ireland.

=== Knockout stage ===
The quarter-final stage produced the widely predicted set of semi-finalists, although England again made heavy weather of defeating a resurgent Wales. England were widely rated the world's best team, but they struggled, at least in the first half, against a Welsh side full of belief after their game against New Zealand. However, spurred into action after the tactical substitution of Catt for Luger and by a Will Greenwood try, set up by a remarkable run by Jason Robinson from inside his own half, England pulled away in the second half, until a late Welsh try gave the scoreline the respectability that their first-half performance had deserved. France destroyed an Irish side who had gone into the match hopeful of a win, scoring 31 early points to put the game out of reach. In the other quarter-finals, a disappointing South Africa fell to a clinical New Zealand and Australia comprehensively defeated the Scots.

The first semi-final produced the first significant upset of the tournament, when Australia defeated the fancied New Zealand to become the first defending champions to reach the following championship final. Unfortunately, it was the last match for Australian star Ben Darwin, who badly injured his neck in a scrum. Although Darwin never played rugby again, the actions of Kees Meeuws – who immediately stopped exerting pressure when he heard the call "neck neck neck" – may well have saved his opponent's life and certainly prevented further injury. The match was decided by a Stirling Mortlock interception try, after a loose pass from highly rated All Blacks fly-half Carlos Spencer, and the excellent kicking of inside-centre Elton Flatley. George Gregan taunted his opponents in defeat with the comment, "Four more years boys, four more years".

The second semi-final saw France face England. The boot of Jonny Wilkinson was the difference between the two sides, with England coming out victors in torrential rain: although France scored the game's only try after an early English line-out error, they never seriously threatened the English line otherwise. With handling and place-kicking being so difficult in the wet and windy conditions (Wilkinson missed three kicks at goal, and Michalak missed four), England's superior forward pressure and territorial control forced France to concede a slew of penalties, of which Wilkinson kicked five, also adding three drop goals (two off his less-favoured right boot) - a remarkable display considering that the swirling winds made accurate kicking as difficult as the rain and mud made passing and running. French ill-discipline also cost them dear, with winger Christophe Dominici and flanker Serge Betsen both receiving yellow-cards for foul play: the former for a cynical trip on Jason Robinson, the latter for a late tackle on Wilkinson.

New Zealand played France in the third-place playoff, and New Zealand avenged their shock defeat to France in the semi-finals at the 1999 World Cup, running in 6 tries in a 40-13 demolition. Mils Muliaina and Doug Howlett scored a try a-piece, finishing as the tournament's joint-leading try-scorers with 7 tries.

=== Final ===
The final between Australia and England was played at Sydney's Stadium Australia in front of a crowd of 82,957, and was refereed by veteran South African official André Watson, in so doing becoming the first, and so far only, referee to officiate two Rugby World Cup finals. Australia opened the scoring after they decided to run a penalty instead of kicking for touch. Lote Tuqiri beat England's right wing, Jason Robinson, to a high cross-field kick and went over for the first try, but Elton Flatley was not able to add the conversion.

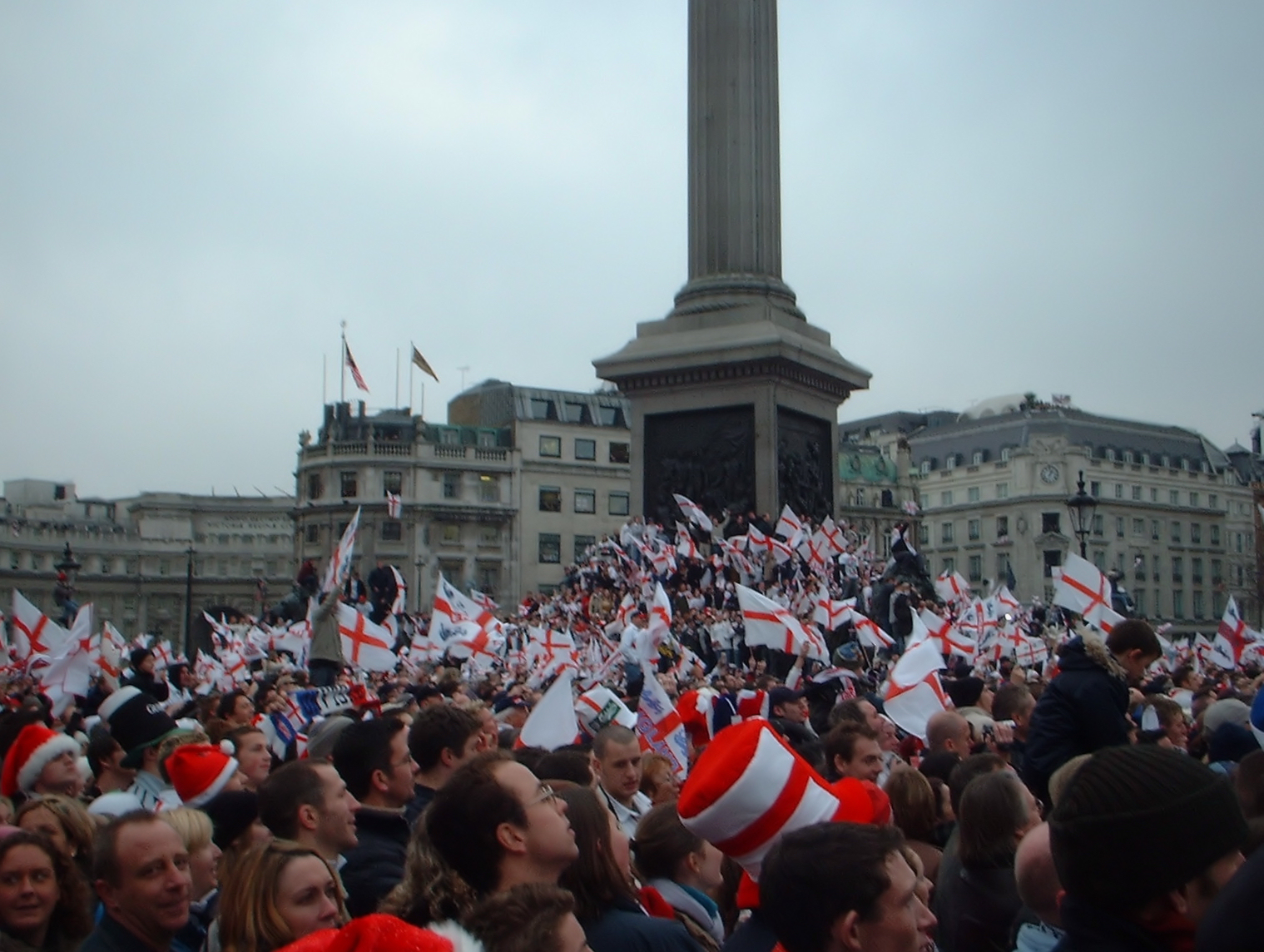
Celebrations in Trafalgar Square

The rest of the half was a tight affair, with England edging in front from applying pressure and Jonny Wilkinson's boot put them up to a 9–5 lead after Australian indiscipline gave away several penalties, but were unable to capitalise on their territory. Towards the end of the first half, England stretched their lead further. Lawrence Dallaglio made a break and popped the ball inside to Jonny Wilkinson, who drew the defence before putting Robinson away in the corner for a try. The conversion was missed, but England went in at half time leading by 14–5.

In the second half Australia tightened their discipline, and solid play forced mistakes from England. The game swung from end to end, with both sides having try-scoring opportunities, but neither able to take them. Australia managed to get points on the board and Elton Flatley scored two penalties to make the score 14–11 to England. In the 79th minute, Australia were putting pressure on England in their half, and Australia were awarded a penalty right before full-time, with the potential to tie the scores. Flatley converted it to make the score 14–14 and take the game into an additional 20 minutes' extra time.

England opened the scoring in extra time with another Wilkinson penalty, but with two and a half minutes of extra time remaining Australia were awarded another penalty, which Flatley kicked successfully. With 20 seconds left before sudden death, Wilkinson scored a drop goal to win the match and with it the world championship.

=== Post-final ===
After the final, Australian Prime Minister John Howard was widely criticised for his behaviour during the presentation ceremony. The offhand manner in which he presented the Webb Ellis Cup to the England captain was seen by many as a graceless piece of bad sportsmanship not befitting such a climactic sporting spectacle.

Three days after the final, the World Cup winning England team landed at Heathrow Airport in the early hours of the morning, emerging from their plane to a huge reception, despite the time. On 8 December, a national day of celebration took place in the form of a massive victory parade in the streets of London.

== Pool stage ==
=== Pool A ===
Team	Pld	W	D	L	PF	PA	PD	BP	Pts	Qualification
Australia	4	4	0	0	273	32	+241	2	18	Quarter-finals
Ireland	4	3	0	1	141	56	+85	3	15	Quarter-finals
Argentina	4	2	0	2	140	57	+83	3	11	
Romania	4	1	0	3	65	192	−127	1	5	
Namibia	4	0	0	4	28	310	−282	0	0	

10 October 2003

Australia	24–8	Argentina
Try: Sailor 20'; Roff 74'; Con: Flatley; Pen: Flatley (4)		Try: Corleto 72'; Pen: M. Contepomi

Stadium Australia, Sydney
Attendance: 81,350
Referee: Paul Honiss (New Zealand)

11 October 2003

Ireland	45–17	Romania
Try: S. Horgan; Wood; Hickie (2); Costello; Con: Humphreys (3); O'Gara; Pen: Humphreys (4)		Try: Penalty try Maftei; Con: Tofan; Vioreanu; Pen: Tofan

Central Coast Stadium, Gosford
Attendance: 19,123
Referee: Jonathan Kaplan (South Africa)

14 October 2003

Argentina	67–14	Namibia
Try: Méndez; Bouza (2); J. Fernández Miranda; Penalty try (2); Gaitán (3); N. Fernández Miranda; Con: Quesada (7); Pen: Quesada		Try: Grobler; Husselman; Con: Wessels (2)

Central Coast Stadium, Gosford
Attendance: 17,887
Referee: Nigel Williams (Wales)

18 October 2003

Australia	90–8	Romania
Try: Flatley; Rogers (3); Burke (2); Larkham (2); Mortlock; Roff; Giteau; Tuqiri; Smith; Con: Flatley (11); Pen: Flatley		Try: Toderașc; Pen: Tofan

Suncorp Stadium, Brisbane
Attendance: 48,778
Referee: Pablo De Luca (Argentina)

19 October 2003

Ireland	64–7	Namibia
Try: Quinlan (2); Dempsey; Hickie; Horan; Miller (2); G. Easterby; S. Horgan; Kelly; Con: O'Gara (7)		Try: Powell; Con: Wessels

Aussie Stadium, Sydney
Attendance: 35,382
Referee: Andrew Cole (Australia)

22 October 2003

Argentina	50–3	Romania
Try: Gaitán; Hernández (2); M. Contepomi; N. Fernández Miranda; Bouza (2); Con: J. Fernández Miranda (4); Quesada (2); Pen: J. Fernández Miranda		Pen: Tofan

Aussie Stadium, Sydney
Attendance: 33,673
Referee: Chris White (England)

25 October 2003

Australia	142–0	Namibia
Try: Latham (5); Lyons; Mortlock; Tuqiri (3); Penalty try Rogers (2); Paul; Giteau (3); Grey; Turinui (2); Burke; Roe; Con: Rogers (16)

Adelaide Oval, Adelaide
Attendance: 28,196
Referee: Joël Jutge (France)

Largest winning margin in Rugby World Cup history.

26 October 2003

Argentina	15–16	Ireland
Pen: Quesada (3); Drop: Quesada; Corleto		Try: Quinlan; Con: Humphreys; Pen: Humphreys; O'Gara (2)

Adelaide Oval, Adelaide
Attendance: 30,203
Referee: André Watson (South Africa)

30 October 2003

Namibia	7–37	Romania
Try: Isaacs; Con: Wessels		Try: Petrechei; Sîrbu; Chiriac; Teodorescu; Săuan; Con: Tofan (3); Pen: Tofan (2)

York Park, Launceston
Attendance: 15,457
Referee: Peter Marshall (Australia)

1 November 2003

Australia	17–16	Ireland
Try: Smith; Pen: Flatley (3); Drop: Gregan		Try: O'Driscoll; Con: O'Gara; Pen: O'Gara (2); Drop: O'Driscoll

Docklands Stadium, Melbourne
Attendance: 54,206
Referee: Paddy O'Brien (New Zealand)

=== Pool B ===
Team	Pld	W	D	L	PF	PA	PD	BP	Pts	Qualification
France	4	4	0	0	204	70	+134	4	20	Quarter-finals
Scotland	4	3	0	1	102	97	+5	2	14	Quarter-finals
Fiji	4	2	0	2	98	114	−16	2	10	
United States	4	1	0	3	86	125	−39	2	6	
Japan	4	0	0	4	79	163	−84	0	0	

11 October 2003

France	61–18	Fiji
Try: Dominici (2); Harinordoquy; Jauzion (3); Ibañez; Con: Michalak (4); Pen: Michalak (6)		Try: Naevo; Caucaunibuca; Con: Little; Pen: Little (2)

Suncorp Stadium, Brisbane
Attendance: 46,795
Referee: Alain Rolland (Ireland)

12 October 2003

Scotland	32–11	Japan
Try: Paterson (2); Grimes; Taylor; Danielli; Con: Paterson; Townsend; Pen: Paterson		Try: Onozawa; Pen: Hirose (2)

Dairy Farmers Stadium, Townsville
Attendance: 19,170
Referee: Stuart Dickinson (Australia)

15 October 2003

Fiji	19–18	United States
Try: Naevo; Con: Little; Pen: Little (4)		Try: Van Zyl; Schubert; Con: Hercus; Pen: Hercus (2)

Suncorp Stadium, Brisbane
Attendance: 30,990
Referee: Joël Jutge (France)

18 October 2003

France	51–29	Japan
Try: Michalak; Rougerie (2); Pelous; Dominici; Crenca; Con: Michalak (5); Merceron; Pen: Michalak (3)		Try: Konia; Ohata; Con: Kurihara (2); Pen: Kurihara (5)

Dairy Farmers Stadium, Townsville
Attendance: 21,309
Referee: Alan Lewis (Ireland)

20 October 2003

Scotland	39–15	United States
Try: Danielli (2); Kerr; Townsend; Paterson; Con: Paterson (4); Pen: Paterson (2)		Pen: Hercus (5)

Suncorp Stadium, Brisbane
Attendance: 46,796
Referee: Jonathan Kaplan (South Africa)

23 October 2003

Fiji	41–13	Japan
Try: Tuilevu (2); Ligairi (2); Vunibaka; Con: Little (2); Pen: Little (4)		Try: Miller; Con: Miller; Pen: Miller; Drop: Miller

Dairy Farmers Stadium, Townsville
Attendance: 17,269
Referee: Nigel Williams (Wales)

Andy Miller's drop goal, at 52 metres, remains the longest in Rugby World Cup history.

25 October 2003

France	51–9	Scotland
Try: Betsen; Harinordoquy; Michalak; Galthié; Brusque; Con: Michalak (3); Merceron; Pen: Michalak (4); Drop: Michalak; Brusque		Pen: Paterson (3)

Stadium Australia, Sydney
Attendance: 78,974
Referee: David McHugh (Ireland)

27 October 2003

Japan	26–39	United States
Try: Kurihara; Ohata; Con: Kurihara (2); Pen: Kurihara (4)		Try: Hercus; Eloff; Schubert; Van Zyl; Khasigian; Con: Hercus (4); Pen: Hercus (2)

Central Coast Stadium, Gosford
Attendance: 19,653
Referee: Steve Walsh (New Zealand)

31 October 2003

France	41–14	United States
Try: Liebenberg (3); Poux; Bru; Con: Merceron (2); Pen: Merceron (3); Drop: Yachvili		Try: Hercus; Schubert; Con: Hercus (2)

WIN Stadium, Wollongong
Attendance: 17,833
Referee: Paul Honiss (New Zealand)

1 November 2003

Scotland	22–20	Fiji
Try: Smith; Con: Paterson; Pen: Paterson (5)		Try: Caucaunibuca (2); Con: Little (2); Pen: Little (2)

Aussie Stadium, Sydney
Attendance: 37,137
Referee: Tony Spreadbury (England)

=== Pool C ===
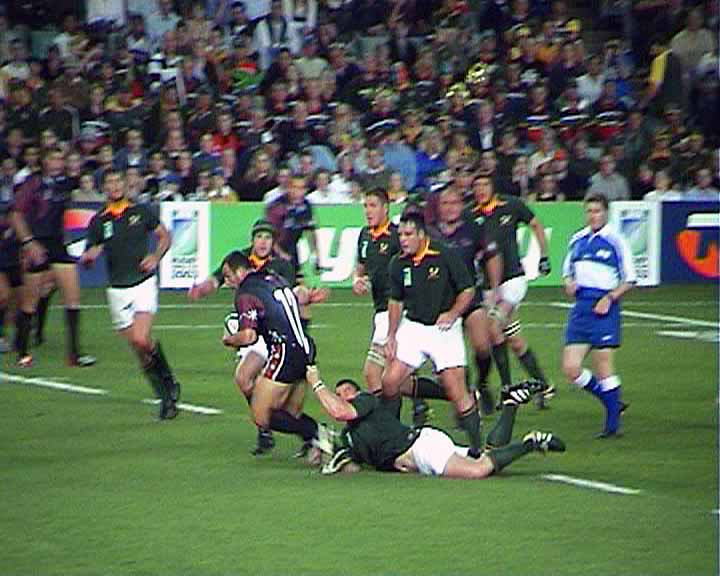
South Africa vs Georgia, 24 October 2003

Team	Pld	W	D	L	PF	PA	PD	BP	Pts	Qualification
England	4	4	0	0	255	47	+208	3	19	Quarter-finals
South Africa	4	3	0	1	184	60	+124	3	15	Quarter-finals
Samoa	4	2	0	2	138	117	+21	2	10	
Uruguay	4	1	0	3	56	255	−199	0	4	
Georgia	4	0	0	4	46	200	−154	0	0	

11 October 2003

South Africa	72–6	Uruguay
Try: Van der Westhuizen (3); Van Niekerk; Botha (2); Delport; Fourie; Bands; Rossouw; Scholtz; Greef; Con: Koen (5); Hougaard		Pen: Aguirre (2)

Subiaco Oval, Perth
Attendance: 16,906
Referee: Paddy O'Brien (New Zealand)

12 October 2003

England	84–6	Georgia
Try: Tindall; Dawson; Thompson; Back; Dallaglio; Greenwood (2); Regan; Cohen (2); Robinson; Luger; Con: Wilkinson (5); Grayson (4); Pen: Wilkinson (2)		Pen: Urjukashvili; Jimsheladze

Subiaco Oval, Perth
Attendance: 25,501
Referee: Pablo De Luca (Argentina)

15 October 2003

Samoa	60–13	Uruguay
Try: Fa'asavalu (2); Lima (2); Tagicakibau; Fa'atau; Lemalu; Vili; Fe'aunati; Palepoi; Con: Va'a (3); Vili (2)		Try: Capó; Lemoine; Pen: Aguirre

Subiaco Oval, Perth
Attendance: 22,020
Referee: David McHugh (Ireland)

18 October 2003

South Africa	6–25	England
Pen: Koen (2)		Try: Greenwood; Con: Wilkinson; Pen: Wilkinson (4); Drop: Wilkinson (2)

Subiaco Oval, Perth
Attendance: 38,834
Referee: Peter Marshall (Australia)

19 October 2003

Georgia	9–46	Samoa
Pen: Jimsheladze (2); Drop: Jimsheladze		Try: Tagicakibau; Va'a; Sititi; So'oialo; Fe'aunati; Lima; Con: Va'a (5); Pen: Va'a (2)

Subiaco Oval, Perth
Attendance: 21,507
Referee: Alain Rolland (Ireland)

24 October 2003

South Africa	46–19	Georgia
Try: Rossouw (2); Hougaard; Van Niekerk; Fourie; Botha; Burger; Con: Hougaard (4); Pen: Hougaard		Try: Dadunashvili; Con: Jimsheladze; Pen: Jimsheladze (3); Kvirikashvili

Aussie Stadium, Sydney
Attendance: 34,308
Referee: Stuart Dickinson (Australia)

26 October 2003

England	35–22	Samoa
Try: Back; Penalty try Balshaw; Vickery; Con: Wilkinson (3); Pen: Wilkinson (2); Drop: Wilkinson		Try: Sititi; Con: Va'a; Pen: Va'a (5)

Docklands Stadium, Melbourne
Attendance: 50,647
Referee: Jonathan Kaplan (South Africa)

28 October 2003

Georgia	12–24	Uruguay
Pen: Urjukashvili; Kvirikashvili (3)		Try: Cardoso; Lamelas; Brignoni; Con: Aguirre (2); Menchaca; Pen: Menchaca

Aussie Stadium, Sydney
Attendance: 28,576
Referee: Kelvin Deaker (New Zealand)

1 November 2003

South Africa	60–10	Samoa
Try: Van Niekerk; Muller; Hougaard; Smith; Willemse; Fourie; Van der Westhuyzen; De Kock; Con: Hougaard (5); Koen (2); Pen: Hougaard; Drop: Hougaard		Try: Palepoi; Con: Va'a; Pen: Va'a

Suncorp Stadium, Brisbane
Attendance: 48,496
Referee: Chris White (England)

2 November 2003

England	111–13	Uruguay
Try: Moody; Lewsey (5); Balshaw (2); Catt (2); Gomarsall (2); Luger; Abbott; Robinson (2); Greenwood; Con: Grayson (11); Catt (2)		Try: Lemoine; Con: Menchaca; Pen: Menchaca (2)

Suncorp Stadium, Brisbane
Attendance: 46,233
Referee: Nigel Williams (Wales)

=== Pool D ===
Team	Pld	W	D	L	PF	PA	PD	BP	Pts	Qualification
New Zealand	4	4	0	0	282	57	+225	4	20	Quarter-finals
Wales	4	3	0	1	132	98	+34	2	14	Quarter-finals
Italy	4	2	0	2	77	123	−46	0	8	
Canada	4	1	0	3	54	135	−81	1	5	
Tonga	4	0	0	4	46	178	−132	1	1	

11 October 2003

New Zealand	70–7	Italy
Try: B. Thorn; R. Thorne; Howlett (2); Spencer (2); Rokocoko (2); Marshall; Carter; MacDonald; Con: Carter (6); Pen: Spencer		Try: Phillips; Con: Peens

Docklands Stadium, Melbourne
Attendance: 41,715
Referee: Andrew Cole (Australia)

12 October 2003

Wales	41–10	Canada
Try: Parker; Cooper; M. Jones; Charvis; Thomas; Con: Harris (5); Pen: Harris (2)		Try: Tkachuk; Con: Pritchard; Drop: Ross

Docklands Stadium, Melbourne
Attendance: 24,874
Referee: Chris White (England)

15 October 2003

Italy	36–12	Tonga
Try: M. Dallan; D. Dallan (2); Con: Wakarua (3); Pen: Wakarua (5)		Try: Payne; Tuʻifua; Con: Tuipulotu

Canberra Stadium, Canberra
Attendance: 18,967
Referee: Steve Walsh (New Zealand)

17 October 2003

New Zealand	68–6	Canada
Try: Ralph (2); So'oialo (2); Muliaina (4); Meeuws; Nonu; Con: Carter (9)		Pen: Barker (2)

Docklands Stadium, Melbourne
Attendance: 38,899
Referee: Tony Spreadbury (England)

19 October 2003

Wales	27–20	Tonga
Try: Cooper; M. Williams; Con: S. Jones; Pen: S. Jones (4); Drop: M. Williams		Try: Hola; Kivalu; Lavaka; Con: Hola; Pen: Hola

Canberra Stadium, Canberra
Attendance: 19,806
Referee: Paul Honiss (New Zealand)

21 October 2003

Italy	19–14	Canada
Try: Parisse; Con: Wakarua; Pen: Wakarua (4)		Try: Fyffe; Pen: Barker (3)

Canberra Stadium, Canberra
Attendance: 20,515
Referee: Paddy O'Brien (New Zealand)

24 October 2003

New Zealand	91–7	Tonga
Try: Braid; Carter; Flynn; Ralph (2); Spencer; Meeuws; Penalty try Muliaina (2); MacDonald; Howlett (2); Con: MacDonald (12); Spencer		Try: Hola; Con: Tuipulotu

Suncorp Stadium, Brisbane
Attendance: 47,588
Referee: Pablo De Luca (Argentina)

25 October 2003

Italy	15–27	Wales
Pen: Wakarua (5)		Try: M. Jones; Parker; D. Jones; Con: Harris (3); Pen: Harris (2)

Canberra Stadium, Canberra
Attendance: 22,641
Referee: Andrew Cole (Australia)

29 October 2003

Canada	24–7	Tonga
Try: Fauth; Abrams; Con: Pritchard; Pen: Ross (4)		Try: Kivalu; Con: Hola

WIN Stadium, Wollongong
Attendance: 15,630
Referee: Alain Rolland (Ireland)

2 November 2003

New Zealand	53–37	Wales
Try: Rokocoko (2); MacDonald; Williams; Howlett (2); Spencer; Mauger; Con: MacDonald (5); Pen: MacDonald		Try: Taylor; Parker; Charvis; S. Williams; Con: S. Jones (4); Pen: S. Jones (3)

Stadium Australia, Sydney
Attendance: 80,012
Referee: André Watson (South Africa)

== Knockout stage ==
Quarter-finals
8 November – Melbourne
New Zealand	29
South Africa	9
8 November – Brisbane
Australia	33
Scotland	16
9 November – Melbourne
France	43
Ireland	21
9 November – Brisbane
England	28
Wales	17

Semi-finals
15 November – Sydney (Telstra)
New Zealand	10
Australia	22
16 November – Sydney (Telstra)
France	7
England	24

Final
22 November – Sydney (Telstra)
Australia	17
England (a.e.t.)	20
Third place
20 November – Sydney (Telstra)
New Zealand	40
France	13

=== Quarter-finals ===
8 November 2003

New Zealand	29–9	South Africa
Try: MacDonald 16' c Mealamu 59' m Rokocoko 72' m Con: MacDonald; Pen: MacDonald (3); Drop: Mauger 45'		Pen: Hougaard (3)

Docklands Stadium, Melbourne
Attendance: 40,734
Referee: Tony Spreadbury (England)

8 November 2003

Australia	33–16	Scotland
Try: Mortlock 46' c Gregan 59' c Lyons 64' c Con: Flatley (3); Pen: Flatley (4)		Try: Russell 80' c Con: Paterson; Pen: Paterson (2); Drop: Paterson 38'

Suncorp Stadium, Brisbane
Attendance: 45,412
Referee: Steve Walsh (New Zealand)

9 November 2003

France	43–21	Ireland
Try: Magne 3' c Dominici 29' c Harinordoquy 33' c Crenca 47' c Con: Michalak (4) 4', 31', 34', 48'; Pen: Michalak (5) 21', 39', 42', 60', 72'	Report	Try: Maggs 52' c O'Driscoll (2) 65' c, 80+2' c Con: Humphreys (3) 53', 66', 81'

Docklands Stadium, Melbourne
Attendance: 33,134
Referee: Jonathan Kaplan (South Africa)

9 November 2003

England	28–17	Wales
Try: Greenwood 44' c Con: Wilkinson; Pen: Wilkinson (6); Drop: Wilkinson 80+1'		Try: S. Jones 30' m Charvis 35' m M. Williams 71' c Con: Harris

Suncorp Stadium, Brisbane
Attendance: 45,252
Referee: Alain Rolland (Ireland)

=== Semi-finals ===
15 November 2003

New Zealand	10–22	Australia
Try: Thorne 35' c Con: MacDonald; Pen: MacDonald		Try: Mortlock 9' c Con: Flatley; Pen: Flatley (5)

Stadium Australia, Sydney
Attendance: 82,444
Referee: Chris White (England)

16 November 2003

France	7–24	England
Try: Betsen 10' c Con: Michalak		Pen: Wilkinson (5); Drop: Wilkinson (3) 9', 38', 58'

Stadium Australia, Sydney
Attendance: 82,346
Referee: Paddy O'Brien (New Zealand)

=== Third-place play-off ===
20 November 2003

New Zealand	40–13	France
Try: Jack 12' c Howlett 20' c Rokocoko 51' c Thorn 54' c Muliaina 58' c Holah 72' m Con: MacDonald; Carter (4)		Try: Elhorga 42' c Con: Yachvili; Pen: Yachvili; Drop: Yachvili

Stadium Australia, Sydney
Attendance: 62,712
Referee: Chris White (England)

=== Final ===
22 November 2003

Australia	17–20 (a.e.t.)	England
Try: Tuqiri 6' m Pen: Flatley (4)	Report	Try: Robinson 38' m Pen: Wilkinson (4); Drop: Wilkinson 100'

Stadium Australia, Sydney
Attendance: 82,957
Referee: André Watson (South Africa)

== Statistics ==
The tournament's top point scorer was England's Jonny Wilkinson, who scored 113 points. Doug Howlett and Mils Muliaina scored the most tries, seven in total.

Player	Team	Position	Played	Tries	Conversions	Penalties	Drop goals	Total points	Yellow cards
Jonny Wilkinson	England	Fly-half	6	0	10	23	8	113	0
Frédéric Michalak	France	Fly-half	6	2	17	18	1	101	0
Elton Flatley	Australia	Centre	6	1	16	21	0	100	0
Leon MacDonald	New Zealand	Centre	7	4	20	5	0	75	0
Chris Paterson	Scotland	Fly-half	5	3	7	13	1	71	0
Mat Rogers	Australia	Full-back	7	5	16	0	0	57	1
Mike Hercus	United States	Fly-half	4	2	7	9	0	51	0
Rima Wakarua	Italy	Fly-half	3	0	4	14	0	50	0
Earl Va'a	Samoa	Fly-half	4	1	10	8	0	49	0
Dan Carter	New Zealand	Fly-half	5	2	19	0	0	48	0

== Broadcasters ==
The event was broadcast by Seven Network and Fox Sports in Australia and by ITV in the United Kingdom.
