= Louis Stanfill =

US international rugby union player

- Born: May 30, 1985 (age 41) Sacramento, California, U.S.
- Height: 6 ft 3 in (1.91 m)
- Weight: 17 st 3 lb (110 kg 243 lb)
- University: University of California, Berkeley

Rugby union career
- Position: Flanker
Amateur team(s)
Years	Team	Apps	(Points)
2004–2008	Berkeley		
2010	Canberra		
2012	NYAC		
2014–2018	Seattle		
- Correct as of 6 September 2015
Senior career
Years	Team	Apps	(Points)
2010–2011	Mogliano	15	(15)
2012–2013	Vicenza		
2018	Austin	1	(0)
2019–2020	San Diego	19	(0)
- Correct as of 5 April 2020
International career
Years	Team	Apps	(Points)
2005–2015	United States	56	(15)
- Correct as of 7 October 2015

Louis Stanfill (born May 30, 1985 in Sacramento, California) is an American former rugby union player who last played for the San Diego Legion of Major League Rugby (MLR). He previously played for the United States national team. He played at flanker or No. 8, and could also play lock.

== Youth and college rugby ==
Stanfill began playing rugby in high school at Jesuit High School (Sacramento), where he led his school to a national semifinal appearance. Stanfill also played high school football, and was named Sacramento defensive player of the year in 2002.

Stanfill played his college rugby at Cal, where they won several national championships during his years there, and Stanfill was selected as an All-American.

== Club rugby ==
Following college, Stanfill played in Australia with the Canberra Royals, before moving to Italy to play with Super 10 club Mogliano in Treviso. At Mogliano he played the Number 8 position. For the 2012 Super League season Stanfill returned to the US to play for NYAC. Due to his strong play the team won the title, finishing the season undefeated. Stanfill was named MVP of the final. Stanfill signed with the Vicenza Rangers rugby club in Italy for the Serie A 2012-13 season. In 2019, Stanfill returned to compete in the second season of Major League Rugby for the San Diego Legion.

== International ==
Stanfill made his international debut against Canada in May 2005, at the age of 19. Stanfill was included in the USA squad for the 2007 Rugby World Cup, where he scored a try against both Tonga and Samoa in the Eagles' pool matches. Stanfill also scored a try against Uruguay in a 2009 qualifying match for the 2011 Rugby World Cup. Stanfill also played at the 2011 Rugby World Cup, where he started 3 matches, and co-lead the team in tackles in the USA's matches against Ireland (11 tackles) and Russia (9 tackles). Stanfill finished his career competing in the 2015 Rugby World Cup in England, starting for the Eagles against heavy favorites South Africa in Olympic Stadium. Louis finished his career with 56 caps, 6th most in USA Rugby history.

== Personal ==
Stanfill was diagnosed with Hodgkin's lymphoma in November 2020.

== See also ==
- United States national rugby union team
- United States at the Rugby World Cup
