= Keiji Hirose =

Japan international rugby union player

- Born: April 16, 1973 (age 53) Osaka, Japan
- Height: 5 ft 7 in (1.70 m)
- Weight: 163 lb (74 kg; 11.6 st)
- School: Shimamoto High School, Osaka
- University: Kyoto Sangyo University

Rugby union career
- Position: Fly-half
Amateur team(s)
Years	Team	Apps	(Points)
1989–1992	Shimamoto High School, Osaka		
1996–1996	Kyoto Sangyo University RFC		
Senior career
Years	Team	Apps	(Points)
1996–2008	Toyota		
International career
Years	Team	Apps	(Points)
1994–2005	Japan	40	(422)

Keiji Hirose (廣瀬佳司, Hirose Keiji), born April 16, 1973, in Osaka) is a former Japanese rugby union player. He played as a fly-half. His club team was Toyota Verblitz. He was nicknamed Golden Boots (ゴールデン・ブーツ, Gôruden Būtsu).

Hirose was awarded 40 caps for Japan; he made his debut in a 26–11 1995 Rugby World Cup qualifier win over South Korea, October 29, 1994, in Kuala Lumpur, Malaysia. In his career, Hirose scored 5 tries, 77 conversions, 79 penalties and 2 drop goals, reaching a national record of 422 points in aggregate. He was the primary goalkicker for Japan during his international career.

He played in a single game at the 1995 Rugby World Cup, the infamous 145–17 defeat to New Zealand. Hirose scored 2 conversions and 1 penalty in the game.

In the 44–17 win over Tonga, at 8 May 1999, in Tokyo, during the Pacific Rim Championship, he kicked a then record of 9 penalties from 9 attempts.

He played in all three of Japan's games at the 1999 Rugby World Cup. His 5 penalties and 4 conversions (a total of 23 points) led his country in scoring. Hirose again played only once at the 2003 Rugby World Cup, in a 32–11 defeat to Scotland, at 12 October 2003, scoring 2 penalties.

His last international game came was on 5 November 2005, a 44–29 win over Spain, in Tokyo. Hirose had a memorable farewell, scoring 19 points through 5 conversions, 2 penalties and 1 drop goal. He was 32 years old.
