= Ray Nelson (rugby union) =

US international rugby union player

- Born: June 11, 1961 (age 65) Glasgow, Scotland

Rugby union career
- Position: Fullback
International career
Years	Team	Apps	(Points)
1983–1991	United States	25	(65)

Ray Nelson (born June 11, 1961 in Glasgow, Scotland) is a Scottish-born American former rugby union player who played fullback for the United States national rugby union team. Nelson played in 25 test matches for the United States from 1983 to 1991, starting in 23.

Nelson represented the U.S. at both the 1987 and 1991 Rugby World Cup. Nelson's 13 points and perfect 4-for-4 goalkicking in a 1987 World Cup match gave the United States its first ever World Cup win in a match against Japan. Nelson scored 28 points for the U.S. at the 1987 and 1991 World Cups combined, and held the U.S. scoring record in World Cups until it was broken by Mike Hercus in 2003.
