= Toru Kurihara =

Japan international rugby union player

- Born: 12 August 1978 (age 48)
- Height: 5 ft 10 in (1.78 m)
- Weight: 180 lb (82 kg; 13 st)
- University: Keio University

Rugby union career
- Position(s): Wing, Fullback
Amateur team(s)
Years	Team	Apps	(Points)
1997-2001	Keio University RFC		
Senior career
Years	Team	Apps	(Points)
2001-2007	Suntory Sungoliath		
2008-2014	NTT Communications Shining Arcs		
International career
Years	Team	Apps	(Points)
2000-2003	Japan	27	(347)

Toru Kurihara (栗原 徹, Kurihara Tōru; born 12 August 1978 in Ibaraki Prefecture) is a Japanese rugby union player. He plays as a fullback or wing.

He played for Suntory Sungoliath.

Kurihara had 27 caps for Japan, from 2000 to 2003, scoring 20 tries, 71 conversions and 35 penalties, 347 points on aggregate. He played four times at the 2003 Rugby World Cup, scoring 1 try, 4 conversions and 9 penalties, 40 points in aggregate. He has been absent from his National Team since then.

Kurihara made History when he scored 6 tries and 15 conversions, 60 points on aggregate, in the 120–3 win over Taiwan, on 21 July 2002, in a Rugby World Cup qualifier, setting a new world record for points in a match.
