= Joël Jutge =

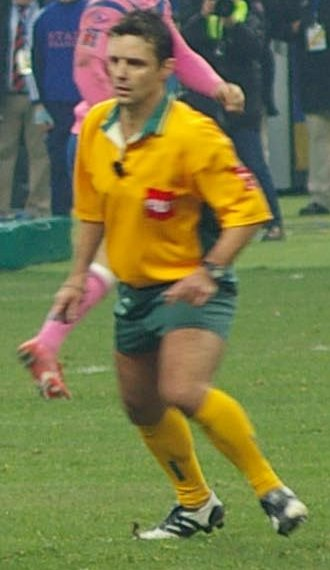
- Born: 5 April 1966 (age 60) Lavaur, Tarn

Rugby union career
- Position: Scrum-half
Senior career
Years	Team	Apps	(Points)
–	US Colomiers		
–	Cahors		
Refereeing career
Years	Competition		Apps
2003-2007	Rugby World Cup		
2000-2009	Test Matches		
2002-	Six Nations		
–	Heineken Cup		

Joël Jutge (born 5 April 1966 in Lavaur, Tarn) is a former French international rugby union referee. He made his international refereeing debut in a 2000 match between Italy and Romania in Naples. Jutge decided to be a referee in 1991 after his playing career was brought to an end by a knee ligament injury. He played for French club US Colomiers as a scrum-half, and later moved to Cahors before becoming a referee. He is now a referee manager.

He controlled many notable matches, and officiated his first Six Nations Championship match in 2002, between Wales and Scotland in Cardiff and subsequently the Heineken Cup final between Leicester Tigers and Munster. He was a referee at the 2003 Rugby World Cup in Australia and was appointed as one for the 2007 Rugby World Cup in France also.

However, since the 2007 World Cup, he suffered a chronic knee injury and had to withdraw from refereeing the Calcutta Cup match in 2009. On 16 June 2009 it was announced that Jutge had retired from refereeing.

On 3 August 2012 Jutge was announced as Paddy O'Brien's successor to the position of IRB High Performance Match Official Manager. He will begin on 3 September 2012.
