= Kort Schubert =

US international rugby union player

- Born: Kort Smith Schubert; July 24, 1979 (age 47) Sacramento, California, USA
- Height: 191 cm (6 ft 3 in)
- Weight: 112.5 kg (17 st 10 lb)
- School: Jesuit High School
- University: University of California, Berkeley

Rugby union career
- Position: Back row
Provincial / State sides
| Years | Team | Apps | (Points) |
| 2004–2006 | Cardiff Blues | 37 | (20) |
- Correct as of 1 January 2021
International career
| Years | Team | Apps | (Points) |
| 2000–2008 | United States | 49 | (20) |
- Correct as of 1 January 2021

Kort Schubert (born July 24, 1979 in Sacramento, California) is a former American rugby union footballer who captained the United States national team. He played flanker, number eight and lock. Schubert earned 49 caps (50 test matches) for the U.S. national team from 2000 until 2008. At the time of his international retirement, Schubert was the third most capped U.S. player of all time, and Schubert had started in 49 tests at the backrow positions.

== Youth Rugby ==
Schubert began his rugby career at Jesuit High School in Carmichael, California. Jesuit High School won the 2006 national rugby championship.

He captained the University of California and won five consecutive US collegiate championships. He earned 2 consecutive Woodley Awards in 2001 and 2002, collegiate rugby's equivalent to the Heisman. He was named 2001–02 University of California (Berkeley) Athlete of the Year.

== International ==
Schubert made his debut for the US Eagles in May 2000 playing against Japan in a 36–21 win. Schubert started all four matches for the US during the 2003 Rugby World Cup, scoring 3 tries for the US, a USA Rugby World Cup record. Schubert earned 48 caps for the American side from 2000 until 2006, before injury issues arose. As of 2006, Schubert was the third most capped US player of all time. He did not play for the US during the 2007 Rugby World Cup. He received one more cap in 2008, before retiring with 49 caps for the US Eagles and scored four tries (20 points).

Schubert joined the Welsh side Cardiff Blues in the Celtic League in August 2004 where he played until 2006.

Following knee surgery, Schubert joined the Cal coaching staff from 2007 to 2008 as an assistant to head coach Jack Clark.
