= Philip Eloff =

American former rugby union centre

- Born: Philip Thabu Eloff; September 17, 1978 (age 48) Thabazimbi, South Africa
- Height: 1.83 m (6 ft 0 in)
- Weight: 91 kg (201 lb)

Rugby union career
- Position: Centre
Amateur team(s)
Years	Team	Apps	(Points)
- Chicago Lions
International career
Years	Team	Apps	(Points)
2000–2007	United States	35	(50)

Philip Eloff (born 17 September 1978) is an American former rugby union centre. Eloff played for the United States national rugby union team from 2000 to 2007, earning 35 caps.

== Early life ==
Eloff was born in Thabazimbi, South Africa. He went to college at Northeastern Illinois University and played his club rugby with the Chicago Lions of the Rugby Super League.

== Career ==
Eloff scored 10 tries in his U.S. international career, ranking him second on the list of all-time U.S. try scorers at the time of his retirement (he has since fallen to fourth). His scoring includes a two-try performance in a win against Spain in a qualifying match for the 2003 Rugby World Cup and three tries against Barbados in a 2006 match.

Eloff played for the U.S. at the 2003 Rugby World Cup, starting all four matches and scoring a try in the US 39–26 victory against Japan. He participated with the U.S. squad at the 2007 Rugby World Cup, playing in three matches including two starts (missing the first match as he was recovering from injury), and he retired from international play following the 2007 tournament.

== Personal life ==
Philip Eloff is the older brother of JP Eloff, who starred on the Davenport University rugby team.

== See also ==
- United States national rugby union team
- Chicago Lions
