= Mike Hercus =

US international rugby union player (born 1979)

- Born: June 5, 1979 (age 47) Falls Church, Virginia, United States
- Height: 5 ft 11 in (1.80 m)
- Weight: 12 st 13 lb (82 kg)
- School: Shore School, Sydney

Rugby union career
- Position: Fly-half
Amateur team(s)
Years	Team	Apps	(Points)
1992–1994	Belmont Shore		
2007–2008	Belmont Shore		
2008–2009	IBM Big Blue		
2009	Stingrays		
2010	Gordon RFC		
Senior career
Years	Team	Apps	(Points)
2003–2005	Sale Sharks	22	(125)
2005–2006	Llanelli Scarlets	23	(182)
2006–2007	Newport Gwent Dragons	14	(11)
International career
Years	Team	Apps	(Points)
2002–2009	United States	48	(465)

Mike Hercus (born June 5, 1979) is an American-Australian former professional rugby union player who played at fly-half for the United States national team and several top-level professional clubs around the globe.

Hercus is the USA Eagles' all-time leading scorer with 465 points and is the leading scorer for the U.S. in Rugby World Cups with 77 points. At the time of his final match, Hercus was the Eagles' all-time most-capped back.

== Early life and career ==
Hercus was born in Falls Church, Virginia, but his parents returned to their native Australia, where he was brought up and educated at Shore School in North Sydney. He started in their first XV for two years and was captained by Phil Waugh when they were in Year 12. He played for the Australian schoolboys rugby union team and later progressed to the Australian under-21 side.

== Rugby career ==
=== 2003–2007 ===
The American national team, the USA Eagles, gave him a route into international rugby union. Hercus made his debut for the U.S. national team in 2002. Hercus played in the 2003 Rugby World Cup, scoring 51 points for the Eagles.

Hercus played at Sale Sharks for two seasons as Charlie Hodgson's understudy before moving to Llanelli Scarlets. Hercus secured a starting position at fly-half during the season, which he maintained in the 2006 Powergen Cup final (which saw the Scarlets lose to London Wasps 26–10). Hercus moved to the Newport Gwent Dragons in the summer of 2006 after it was announced that Welsh international fly-half Stephen Jones was to move to the Scarlets.

Also, in 2006, Hercus was invited to play for the prestigious Barbarians FC. His Barbarians cap came in the annual clash vs Leicester Tigers, in which he scored 17 points, including a try.

=== 2007–2010 ===
Hercus captained the Eagles in their 2006 qualifying matches against Uruguay for the 2007 Rugby World Cup. He returned to the US for the start of the 2007 U.S. Rugby Super League season, where he played for Belmont Shore and was in the US Falcons NA4 squad. Hercus started all four matches for the U.S. in the 2007 Rugby World Cup.

At the start of 2008, Hercus signed a contract to play for Japanese club IBM Big Blue. In 2009, after just one season, Hercus signed with the Australian club Sunshine Coast Stingrays, where he was the club's leading scorer in limited action. Hercus played with the USA Eagles during the 2009 summer internationals, including the Eagles against Canada and Uruguay in the 2011 Rugby World Cup qualifying matches. These qualifying matches in 2009 were Hercus's last matches for the U.S. national team.

In 2010, Hercus returned to Australia and his junior club, the Gordon Highlanders, to compete in the Shute Shield. To start the season, he was named Gordon's captain but saw limited action due to injury. By midseason, rumors began to leak out that he had retired or intended to retire from both international and club rugby due to persistent recurring injuries. Although no official announcement has ever been made, he has been presumed retired since summer 2010.

== Personal life ==
Hercus is married to TV presenter Natalie Michaels. He works as a Portfolio Manager for Soul Patts.
