= Kojiro Yoshinaga =

Japan international rugby union player

- Born: July 8, 1961 (age 65) Tokyo, Japan
- University: Nippon Sport Science University

Rugby union career
- Position: Centre
Senior career
Years	Team	Apps	(Points)
198?-1990	Mazda Motor Corporation		
International career
Years	Team	Apps	(Points)
1986-1990	Japan	6	(11)
Coaching career
- Years: Team
- 2003-2007: Toyota Verblitz

Kojiro Yoshinaga (吉永宏二郎, Yoshinaga Kojirō); born 8 June 1961 in Tokyo) is a former Japanese rugby union player and coach. He played as a centre.

== Career ==
Yoshinaga started his rugby career when he played for the team of Nippon Sports Sciences University, the university he attended. After his graduation, Yoshinaga started to play for Mazda Motors Corporation in the All-Japan Rugby Company Championship, in all of his career. Yoshinaga was first capped for Japan in the match against Korea, at Bangkok, on 29 November 1986. He also was capped for the 1987 Rugby World Cup, playing 2 matches in the tournament, making him the only player in Mazda Motor Company's history to take part in a Rugby World Cup. Yoshinaga was also present in the Japanese squad who defeated Scotland in 1989. His last international cap was against Samoa, at Tokyo, on 15 April 1990.
