= Riaan van Zyl =

US international rugby union player

- Born: July 9, 1972 (age 54)
- Height: 6 ft 0 in (1.83 m)
- Weight: 200 lb (91 kg; 14 st 4 lb)

Rugby union career
- Position: Wing
International career
Years	Team	Apps	(Points)
2003–2004	United States	13	(45)
National sevens team
Years	Team		Comps
1996	South Africa 7s		2

Riaan van Zyl (born July 9, 1972) is an American former rugby union player. He played wing for the United States national team from 2003 to 2004. In that short span, he earned 13 caps including 12 starts, and scored 9 tries. He started all four matches for the US during the 2003 Rugby World Cup where he scored 2 tries.
