= Daisuke Ohata =

Japan international rugby union player

Daisuke Ohata 大畑大介
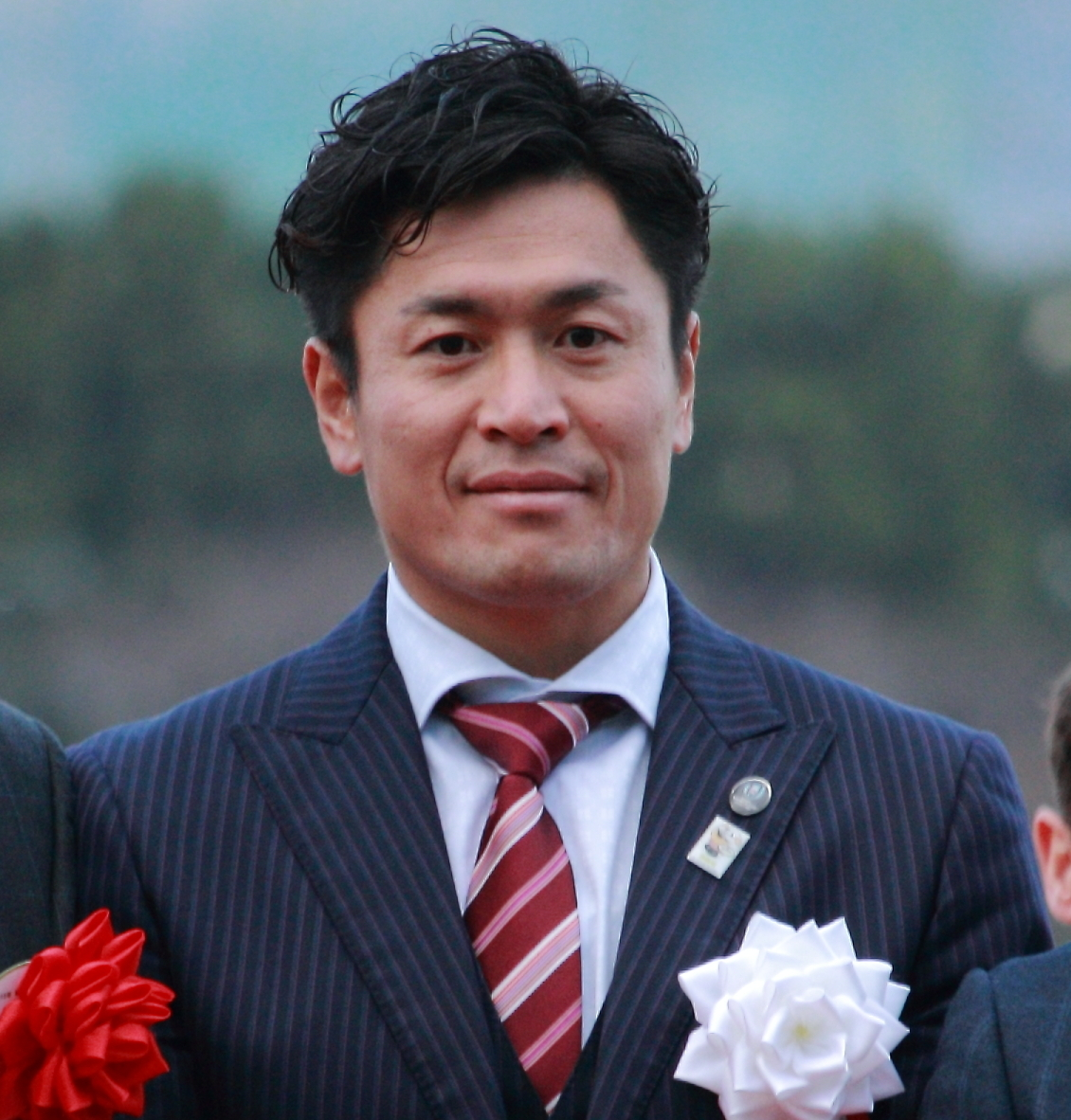
- Ohata in 2015
- Born: 11 November 1975 (age 51) Osaka, Osaka Prefecture, Japan
- Height: 176 cm (5 ft 9 in)
- Weight: 82 kg (181 lb)
- University: Kyoto Sangyo University

Rugby union career
- Position(s): Wing, Centre
Senior career
Years	Team	Apps	(Points)
1998–2002	Kobe Steel		
2003	Clermont Montferrand	2	(20)
2003–2011	Kobe Steelers	67	(210)
International career
Years	Team	Apps	(Points)
1996–2006	Japan	58	(345)
- Correct as of 25 November 2006
National sevens team
Years	Team		Comps
–1996	Japan		13

Daisuke Ohata (大畑大介, Ōhata Daisuke; born 11 November 1975) is a Japanese former rugby union player. He played on the wing centre for the Japan national team. He made his name internationally as a speedy ace in the World Rugby Sevens Series (then known as the IRB World Sevens Series), and went on to become a regular member of the national team. He first played for Japan in 1996, scoring three tries on his debut.

Ohata is the leading rugby union Test try scorer of all time with 69 tries. In November 2016, Ohata was inducted into the World Rugby Hall of Fame at the opening ceremony for the Hall's first physical location in Rugby, Warwickshire.

== Life and career ==
Ohata was born in Osaka and speaks with a strong Kansai accent. He attended rugby schools Tokai Dai Gyosei High School, alongside Japanese rugby teammates Koji Uehara and Yoshinori Tateyama, and Kyoto Sangyo University.

== Try record ==
On 14 May 2006, Ohata scored three tries for Japan against Georgia at Hanazono Stadium, in doing so claiming the world record for tries in rugby Test matches. This gave him sixty-five tries for his country in fifty-five tests; he has since extended his record to sixty-nine tries from fifty-eight tests. The record was previously held by David Campese of Australia, who scored 64 tries from 101 tests. Bryan Habana of South Africa eclipsed Campese's record with 67 tries (124 caps), the last one coming in 2016. However, unlike Campese and Habana, only a quarter of Ohata's tries were scored against major rugby union playing nations, causing controversy in some media.

Ohata did not take part in the 2007 Rugby World Cup for Japan as he had ruptured his left achilles tendon in an August practice match against Portugal. He had only just returned that month to the national side, having recovered from a right achilles tendon rupture in January.

In January 2011, Ohata announced his retirement. The 35-year-old stated: “It's sad that it ended like this but I think I have had a good career. I feel I have left my mark as a rugby player.”

== Personal life ==
In the early 2000s, Ohata featured on the TV program, Pro Sportsman No.1. He became one of most prominent competitors in the series, and shined in the 2001 and 2003 tournaments, achieving No. 1 in said tournaments. He also earned New World Record of Shot-Gun-Touch event at the time by achieving 13m 40cm.

== See also ==
- List of leading rugby union Test try scorers
