= 2003 Rugby World Cup Pool C =

Pool C was one of four pools at the 2003 Rugby World Cup into which the 20 participating teams were divided. The pool included South Africa and England, who both qualified automatically having reached the quarter-finals of the 1999 tournament, along with Samoa, Georgia and Uruguay.

== Teams ==
| Team | Method of qualification | Date of qualification | Apps. | Last | Previous best performance | IRB World Ranking (6 October 2003) |
|---|---|---|---|---|---|---|
| South Africa | Quarter-finalists in 1999 | 15 October 1999 | 3rd | 1999 | Champions (1995) | 6 |
| England | Quarter-finalists in 1999 | 20 October 1999 | 5th | 1999 | Runners-up (1991) | 1 |
| Samoa | Oceania 2 | 28 June 2002 | 4th | 1999 | Quarter-finals (1991, 1995) | 8 |
| Georgia | Europe 4 | 13 October 2002 | 1st | n/a | n/a | 17 |
| Uruguay | Americas 2 | 8 October 2002 | 2nd | 1999 | Pool stage (1999) | 19 |

== Standings ==
| Pos | Team | Pld | W | D | L | PF | PA | PD | B | Pts | Qualification |
|---|---|---|---|---|---|---|---|---|---|---|---|
| 1 | England | 4 | 4 | 0 | 0 | 255 | 47 | +208 | 3 | 19 | Advance to quarter-finals, and qualification to the 2007 Rugby World Cup |
| 2 | South Africa | 4 | 3 | 0 | 1 | 184 | 60 | +124 | 3 | 15 | Advance to quarter-finals, and qualification to the 2007 Rugby World Cup |
| 3 | Samoa | 4 | 2 | 0 | 2 | 138 | 117 | +21 | 2 | 10 | Qualification to the 2007 Rugby World Cup |
| 4 | Uruguay | 4 | 1 | 0 | 3 | 56 | 255 | −199 | 0 | 4 | |
| 5 | Georgia | 4 | 0 | 0 | 4 | 40 | 200 | −160 | 0 | 0 | |

In the quarter-finals:

- The winners of Pool C advanced to play the runners-up of Pool D.
- The runners-up of Pool C advanced to play the winners of Pool D.

== Matches ==
=== South Africa vs Uruguay ===
11 October 2003

| South Africa | 72–6 | Uruguay |
| Try: Van der Westhuizen (3); Van Niekerk; Botha (2); Delport; Fourie; Bands; Rossouw; Scholtz; Greef; Con: Koen (5); Hougaard | Report | Pen: Aguirre (2) |

Subiaco Oval, Perth
Attendance: 16,906
Referee: Paddy O'Brien (New Zealand)

| FB | 15 | Werner Greeff |
| RW | 14 | Ashwin Willemse |
| OC | 13 | Jaque Fourie |
| IC | 12 | De Wet Barry |
| LW | 11 | Thinus Delport |
| FH | 10 | Louis Koen |
| SH | 9 | Joost van der Westhuizen (c) |
| N8 | 8 | Juan Smith |
| OF | 7 | Danie Rossouw |
| BF | 6 | Joe van Niekerk |
| RL | 5 | Victor Matfield |
| LL | 4 | Bakkies Botha |
| TP | 3 | Richard Bands |
| HK | 2 | Danie Coetzee |
| LP | 1 | Lawrence Sephaka |
Replacements:
| HK | 16 | John Smit |
| PR | 17 | Faan Rautenbach |
| LK | 18 | Selborne Boome |
| FL | 19 | Hendro Scholtz |
| SH | 20 | Neil de Kock |
| FH | 21 | Derick Hougaard |
| FB | 22 | Ricardo Loubscher |
Coach:
Rudolf Straeuli

| FB | 15 | Joaquin Pastore |
| RW | 14 | Alfonso Cardoso |
| OC | 13 | Diego Aguirre (c) |
| IC | 12 | Martín Mendaro |
| LW | 11 | Emiliano Ibarra |
| FH | 10 | Sebastián Aguirre |
| SH | 9 | Emiliano Caffera |
| N8 | 8 | Rodrigo Capó Ortega |
| OF | 7 | Marcelo Gutierrez |
| BF | 6 | Nicolas Brignoni |
| RL | 5 | Juan Carlos Bado |
| LL | 4 | Juan Alzueta |
| TP | 3 | Pablo Lemoine |
| HK | 2 | Diego Lamelas |
| LP | 1 | Rodrigo Sánchez |
Replacements:
| PR | 16 | Eduardo Berruti |
| HK | 17 | Juan Andrés Pérez |
| PR | 18 | Guillermo Storace |
| FL | 19 | Nicolás Grille |
| FL | 20 | Hernán Ponte |
| FH | 21 | Bernardo Amarillo |
| FB | 22 | Juan Menchaca |
Coach:
Diego Ormaechea

=== England vs Georgia ===
12 October 2003

| England | 84–6 | Georgia |
| Try: Tindall; Dawson; Thompson; Back; Dallaglio; Greenwood (2); Regan; Cohen (2); Robinson; Luger; Con: Wilkinson (5); Grayson (4); Pen: Wilkinson (2) | Report | Pen: Urjukashvili; Jimsheladze |

Subiaco Oval, Perth
Attendance: 25,501
Referee: Pablo De Luca (Argentina)

| FB | 15 | Josh Lewsey |
| RW | 14 | Jason Robinson |
| OC | 13 | Will Greenwood |
| IC | 12 | Mike Tindall |
| LW | 11 | Ben Cohen |
| FH | 10 | Jonny Wilkinson |
| SH | 9 | Matt Dawson |
| N8 | 8 | Lawrence Dallaglio |
| OF | 7 | Neil Back |
| BF | 6 | Richard Hill |
| RL | 5 | Ben Kay |
| LL | 4 | Martin Johnson (c) |
| TP | 3 | Phil Vickery |
| HK | 2 | Steve Thompson |
| LP | 1 | Trevor Woodman |
Replacements:
| HK | 16 | Mark Regan |
| PR | 17 | Jason Leonard |
| LK | 18 | Danny Grewcock |
| FL | 19 | Lewis Moody |
| SH | 20 | Andy Gomarsall |
| FH | 21 | Paul Grayson |
| WG | 22 | Dan Luger |
Coach:
Clive Woodward

| FB | 15 | Bessik Khamashuridze |
| RW | 14 | Malkhaz Urjukashvili |
| OC | 13 | Tedo Zibzibadze |
| IC | 12 | Irakli Giorgadze |
| LW | 11 | Vasil Katsadze (c) |
| FH | 10 | Paliko Jimsheladze |
| SH | 9 | Irakli Abuseridze |
| N8 | 8 | Giorgi Chkhaidze |
| OF | 7 | Grégoire Yachvili |
| BF | 6 | Gia Labadze |
| RL | 5 | Victor Didebulidze |
| LL | 4 | Zurab Mtchedlishvili |
| TP | 3 | Aleka Margvelashvili |
| HK | 2 | Akvsenti Giorgadze |
| LP | 1 | Goderdzi Shvelidze |
Replacements:
| HK | 16 | David Dadunashvili |
| PR | 17 | Soso Nikolaenko |
| LK | 18 | Vano Nadiradze |
| FL | 19 | David Bolgashvili |
| FH | 20 | Merab Kvirikashvili |
| FB | 21 | Irakli Machkhaneli |
| WG | 22 | Badri Khekhelashvili |
Coach:
(France) Claude Saurel

=== Samoa vs Uruguay ===
15 October 2003

| Samoa | 60–13 | Uruguay |
| Try: Fa'asavalu (2); Lima (2); Tagicakibau; Fa'atau; Lemalu; Vili; Feaunati; Palepoi; Con: Va'a (3); Vili (2) | Report | Try: Capó; Lemoine; Pen: Aguirre |

Subiaco Oval, Perth
Attendance: 22,020
Referee: David McHugh (Ireland)

| FB | 15 | Tanner Vili |
| RW | 14 | Lome Fa'atau |
| OC | 13 | Terry Fanolua |
| IC | 12 | Brian Lima |
| LW | 11 | Sailosi Tagicakibau |
| FH | 10 | Earl Va'a |
| SH | 9 | Steven So'oialo |
| N8 | 8 | Semo Sititi (c) |
| OF | 7 | Maurie Fa'asavalu |
| BF | 6 | Peter Poulos |
| RL | 5 | Leo Lafaiali'i |
| LL | 4 | Opeta Palepoi |
| TP | 3 | Jeremy Tomuli |
| HK | 2 | Jonathan Meredith |
| LP | 1 | Kas Lealamanua |
Replacements:
| HK | 16 | Mahonri Schwalger |
| PR | 17 | Simon Lemalu |
| N8 | 18 | Kitiona Viliamu |
| FL | 19 | Des Tuiavi'i |
| SH | 20 | Denning Tyrell |
| CE | 21 | Dale Rasmussen |
| WG | 22 | Dominic Fe'aunati |
Coach:
(New Zealand) John Boe

| FB | 15 | Juan Menchaca |
| RW | 14 | Joaquin Pastore |
| OC | 13 | Diego Aguirre (c) |
| IC | 12 | Martín Mendaro |
| LW | 11 | Carlos Baldassari |
| FH | 10 | Bernardo Amarillo |
| SH | 9 | Juan Campomar |
| N8 | 8 | Rodrigo Capó Ortega |
| OF | 7 | Nicolás Grille |
| BF | 6 | Marcelo Gutierrez |
| RL | 5 | Juan Alzueta |
| LL | 4 | Juan Carlos Bado |
| TP | 3 | Pablo Lemoine |
| HK | 2 | Diego Lamelas |
| LP | 1 | Rodrigo Sánchez |
Replacements:
| HK | 16 | Juan Andrés Pérez |
| PR | 17 | Juan Machado |
| LK | 18 | Juan Álvarez |
| FL | 19 | Nicolas Brignoni |
| FL | 20 | Ignacio Conti |
| CE | 21 | Joaquín de Freitas |
| WG | 22 | José Viana |
Coach:
Diego Ormaechea

=== South Africa vs England ===
18 October 2003

| South Africa | 6–25 | England |
| Pen: Koen (2) | Report | Try: Greenwood; Con: Wilkinson; Pen: Wilkinson (4); Drop: Wilkinson (2) |

Subiaco Oval, Perth
Attendance: 38,834
Referee: Peter Marshall (Australia)

| FB | 15 | Jaco van der Westhuyzen |
| RW | 14 | Ashwin Willemse |
| OC | 13 | Jorrie Muller |
| IC | 12 | De Wet Barry |
| LW | 11 | Thinus Delport |
| FH | 10 | Louis Koen |
| SH | 9 | Joost van der Westhuizen |
| N8 | 8 | Juan Smith |
| OF | 7 | Joe van Niekerk |
| BF | 6 | Corné Krige (c) |
| RL | 5 | Victor Matfield |
| LL | 4 | Bakkies Botha |
| TP | 3 | Richard Bands |
| HK | 2 | Danie Coetzee |
| LP | 1 | Christo Bezuidenhout |
Replacements:
| HK | 16 | John Smit |
| PR | 17 | Lawrence Sephaka |
| LK | 18 | Selborne Boome |
| LK | 19 | Danie Rossouw |
| SH | 20 | Neil de Kock |
| FH | 21 | Derick Hougaard |
| WG | 22 | Werner Greeff |
Coach:
Rudolf Straeuli

| FB | 15 | Josh Lewsey |
| RW | 14 | Jason Robinson |
| OC | 13 | Will Greenwood |
| IC | 12 | Mike Tindall |
| LW | 11 | Ben Cohen |
| FH | 10 | Jonny Wilkinson |
| SH | 9 | Kyran Bracken |
| N8 | 8 | Lawrence Dallaglio |
| OF | 7 | Neil Back |
| BF | 6 | Lewis Moody |
| RL | 5 | Ben Kay |
| LL | 4 | Martin Johnson (c) |
| TP | 3 | Phil Vickery |
| HK | 2 | Steve Thompson |
| LP | 1 | Trevor Woodman |
Replacements:
| HK | 16 | Dorian West |
| PR | 17 | Jason Leonard |
| N8 | 18 | Martin Corry |
| FL | 19 | Joe Worsley |
| SH | 20 | Andy Gomarsall |
| FH | 21 | Paul Grayson |
| WG | 22 | Dan Luger |
Coach:
Clive Woodward

=== Georgia vs Samoa ===
19 October 2003

| Georgia | 9–46 | Samoa |
| Pen: Jimsheladze (2); Drop: Jimsheladze | Report | Try: Tagicakibau; Va'a; Sititi; So'oialo; Feaunati; Lima; Con: Va'a (5); Pen: Va'a (2) |

Subiaco Oval, Perth
Attendance: 21,507
Referee: Alain Rolland (Ireland)

| FB | 15 | Badri Khekhelashvili |
| RW | 14 | Malkhaz Urjukashvili |
| OC | 13 | Tedo Zibzibadze |
| IC | 12 | Irakli Giorgadze |
| LW | 11 | Vasil Katsadze |
| FH | 10 | Paliko Jimsheladze |
| SH | 9 | Irakli Abuseridze |
| N8 | 8 | Gia Labadze |
| OF | 7 | Grégoire Yachvili |
| BF | 6 | Ilia Zedginidze (c) |
| RL | 5 | Zurab Mtchedlishvili |
| LL | 4 | Vano Nadiradze |
| TP | 3 | Goderdzi Shvelidze |
| HK | 2 | Akvsenti Giorgadze |
| LP | 1 | Soso Nikolaenko |
Replacements:
| HK | 16 | David Dadunashvili |
| PR | 17 | Aleko Margvelashvili |
| LK | 18 | Victor Didebulidze |
| FL | 19 | David Bolgashvili |
| FH | 20 | Merab Kvirikashvili |
| FB | 21 | Irakli Machkhaneli |
| FB | 22 | Bessik Khamashuridze |
Coach:
(France) Claude Saurel

| FB | 15 | Tanner Vili |
| RW | 14 | Ron Fanuatanu |
| OC | 13 | Terry Fanolua |
| IC | 12 | Brian Lima |
| LW | 11 | Sailosi Tagicakibau |
| FH | 10 | Earl Va'a |
| SH | 9 | Steven So'oialo |
| N8 | 8 | Semo Sititi (c) |
| OF | 7 | Maurie Fa'asavalu |
| BF | 6 | Peter Poulos |
| RL | 5 | Leo Lafaiali'i |
| LL | 4 | Opeta Palepoi |
| TP | 3 | Jeremy Tomuli |
| HK | 2 | Jonathan Meredith |
| LP | 1 | Kas Lealamanua |
Replacements:
| HK | 16 | Mahonri Schwalger |
| PR | 17 | Simon Lemalu |
| N8 | 18 | Kitiona Viliamu |
| FL | 19 | Siaosi Vaili |
| SH | 20 | Denning Tyrell |
| CE | 21 | Dale Rasmussen |
| WG | 22 | Dominic Fe'aunati |
Coach:
(New Zealand) John Boe

=== South Africa vs Georgia ===
24 October 2003

| South Africa | 46–19 | Georgia |
| Try: Rossouw (2); Hougaard; Van Niekerk; Fourie; Botha; Burger; Con: Hougaard (4); Pen: Hougaard | Report | Try: Dadunashvili; Con: Jimsheladze; Pen: Jimsheladze (3); Kvirikashvili |

Aussie Stadium, Sydney
Attendance: 34,308
Referee: Stuart Dickinson (Australia)

| FB | 15 | Ricardo Loubscher |
| RW | 14 | Stefan Terblanche |
| OC | 13 | Jaque Fourie |
| IC | 12 | Werner Greeff |
| LW | 11 | Breyton Paulse |
| FH | 10 | Derick Hougaard |
| SH | 9 | Neil de Kock |
| N8 | 8 | Joe van Niekerk |
| OF | 7 | Danie Rossouw |
| BF | 6 | Hendro Scholtz |
| RL | 5 | Selborne Boome |
| LL | 4 | Bakkies Botha |
| TP | 3 | Faan Rautenbach |
| HK | 2 | John Smit (c) |
| LP | 1 | Lawrence Sephaka |
Replacements:
| HK | 16 | Dale Santon |
| PR | 17 | Christo Bezuidenhout |
| LK | 18 | Victor Matfield |
| FL | 19 | Schalk Burger |
| SH | 20 | Joost van der Westhuizen |
| FH | 21 | Louis Koen |
| WG | 22 | Jorrie Muller |
Coach:
Rudolf Straeuli

| FB | 15 | Irakli Machkhaneli |
| RW | 14 | Gocha Khonelidze |
| OC | 13 | Otar Eloshvili |
| IC | 12 | Vasil Katsadze (c) |
| LW | 11 | Archil Kavtarashvili |
| FH | 10 | Paliko Jimsheladze |
| SH | 9 | Irakli Modebadze |
| N8 | 8 | Giorgi Chkhaidze |
| OF | 7 | George Tsiklauri |
| BF | 6 | David Bolgashvili |
| RL | 5 | Victor Didebulidze |
| LL | 4 | Sergo Gujaraidze |
| TP | 3 | Aleko Margvelashvili |
| HK | 2 | David Dadunashvili |
| LP | 1 | Avto Kopaliani |
Replacements:
| HK | 16 | Akvsenti Giorgadze |
| PR | 17 | Soso Nikolaenko |
| N8 | 18 | Ilia Zedginidze |
| FL | 19 | Grégoire Yachvili |
| SH | 20 | Irakli Abuseridze |
| FH | 21 | Merab Kvirikashvili |
| FB | 22 | Bessik Khamashuridze |
Coach:
(France) Claude Saurel

=== England vs Samoa ===
26 October 2003

| England | 35–22 | Samoa |
| Try: Back; Penalty try Balshaw; Vickery; Con: Wilkinson (3); Pen: Wilkinson (2); Drop: Wilkinson | Report | Try: Sititi; Con: Va'a; Pen: Va'a (5) |

Docklands Stadium, Melbourne
Attendance: 50,647
Referee: Jonathan Kaplan (South Africa)

| FB | 15 | Jason Robinson |
| RW | 14 | Iain Balshaw |
| OC | 13 | Stuart Abbott |
| IC | 12 | Mike Tindall |
| LW | 11 | Ben Cohen |
| FH | 10 | Jonny Wilkinson |
| SH | 9 | Matt Dawson |
| N8 | 8 | Lawrence Dallaglio |
| OF | 7 | Neil Back |
| BF | 6 | Joe Worsley |
| RL | 5 | Ben Kay |
| LL | 4 | Martin Johnson |
| TP | 3 | Julian White |
| HK | 2 | Mark Regan |
| LP | 1 | Jason Leonard |
Replacements:
| HK | 16 | Steve Thompson |
| PR | 17 | Phil Vickery |
| N8 | 18 | Martin Corry |
| FL | 19 | Lewis Moody |
| SH | 20 | Andy Gomarsall |
| CE | 21 | Mike Catt |
| WG | 22 | Dan Luger |
Coach:
Clive Woodward

| FB | 15 | Tanner Vili |
| RW | 14 | Lome Fa'atau |
| OC | 13 | Terry Fanolua |
| IC | 12 | Brian Lima |
| LW | 11 | Sailosi Tagicakibau |
| FH | 10 | Earl Va'a |
| SH | 9 | Steven So'oialo |
| N8 | 8 | Semo Sititi (c) |
| OF | 7 | Maurie Fa'asavalu |
| BF | 6 | Peter Poulos |
| RL | 5 | Leo Lafaiali'i |
| LL | 4 | Opeta Palepoi |
| TP | 3 | Jeremy Tomuli |
| HK | 2 | Jonathan Meredith |
| LP | 1 | Kas Lealamanua |
Replacements:
| HK | 16 | Mahonri Schwalger |
| PR | 17 | Simon Lemalu |
| N8 | 18 | Kitiona Viliamu |
| FL | 19 | Des Tuiavi'i |
| SH | 20 | Denning Tyrell |
| CE | 21 | Dale Rasmussen |
| WG | 22 | Dominic Fe'aunati |
Coach:
(New Zealand) John Boe

=== Georgia vs Uruguay ===
28 October 2003

| Georgia | 12–24 | Uruguay |
| Pen: Urjukashvili; Kvirikashvili (3) | Report | Try: Cardoso; Lamelas; Brignoni; Con: Aguirre (2); Menchaca; Pen: Menchaca |

Aussie Stadium, Sydney
Attendance: 28,576
Referee: Kelvin Deaker (New Zealand)

| FB | 15 | Irakli Machkhaneli |
| RW | 14 | Malkhaz Urjukashvili |
| OC | 13 | Tedo Zibzibadze |
| IC | 12 | Irakli Giorgadze |
| LW | 11 | Archil Kavtarashvili |
| FH | 10 | Paliko Jimsheladze |
| SH | 9 | Irakli Modebadze |
| N8 | 8 | Giorgi Chkhaidze |
| OF | 7 | Grégoire Yachvili (c) |
| BF | 6 | Ilia Zedginidze |
| RL | 5 | Zurab Mtchedlishvili |
| LL | 4 | Sergo Gujaraidze |
| TP | 3 | Goderdzi Shvelidze |
| HK | 2 | David Dadunashvili |
| LP | 1 | Avto Kopaliani |
Replacements:
| HK | 16 | Akvsenti Giorgadze |
| PR | 17 | Soso Nikolaenko |
| FL | 18 | George Tsiklauri |
| FL | 19 | David Bolgashvili |
| FH | 20 | Merab Kvirikashvili |
| CE | 21 | Vasil Katsadze |
| FB | 22 | Bessik Khamashuridze |
Coach:
(France) Claude Saurel

| FB | 15 | Juan Menchaca |
| RW | 14 | Alfonso Cardoso |
| OC | 13 | Diego Aguirre (c) |
| IC | 12 | Martín Mendaro |
| LW | 11 | Carlos Baldassari |
| FH | 10 | Sebastián Aguirre |
| SH | 9 | Juan Campomar |
| N8 | 8 | Rodrigo Capó Ortega |
| OF | 7 | Hernán Ponte |
| BF | 6 | Nicolás Grille |
| RL | 5 | Juan Alzueta |
| LL | 4 | Juan Carlos Bado |
| TP | 3 | Pablo Lemoine |
| HK | 2 | Diego Lamelas |
| LP | 1 | Rodrigo Sánchez |
Replacements:
| HK | 16 | Juan Andrés Pérez |
| PR | 17 | Eduardo Berruti |
| PR | 18 | Guillermo Storace |
| FL | 19 | Nicolas Brignoni |
| LK | 20 | Marcelo Gutierrez |
| FH | 21 | Bernardo Amarillo |
| CE | 22 | Joaquin Pastore |
Coach:
Diego Ormaechea

=== South Africa vs Samoa ===
1 November 2003

| South Africa | 60–10 | Samoa |
| Try: Van Niekerk; Muller; Hougaard; Smith; Willemse; Fourie; Van der Westhuyzen; De Kock; Con: Hougaard (5); Koen (2); Pen: Hougaard; Drop: Hougaard | Report | Try: Palepoi; Con: Va'a; Pen: Va'a |

Suncorp Stadium, Brisbane
Attendance: 48,496
Referee: Chris White (England)

| FB | 15 | Jaco van der Westhuyzen |
| RW | 14 | Ashwin Willemse |
| OC | 13 | Jorrie Muller |
| IC | 12 | De Wet Barry |
| LW | 11 | Thinus Delport |
| FH | 10 | Derick Hougaard |
| SH | 9 | Joost van der Westhuizen |
| N8 | 8 | Juan Smith |
| OF | 7 | Joe van Niekerk |
| BF | 6 | Corné Krige (c) |
| RL | 5 | Victor Matfield |
| LL | 4 | Bakkies Botha |
| TP | 3 | Faan Rautenbach |
| HK | 2 | John Smit |
| LP | 1 | Christo Bezuidenhout |
Replacements:
| HK | 16 | Danie Coetzee |
| PR | 17 | Richard Bands |
| LK | 18 | Danie Rossouw |
| FL | 19 | Schalk Burger |
| SH | 20 | Neil de Kock |
| FH | 21 | Louis Koen |
| CE | 22 | Jaque Fourie |
Coach:
Rudolf Straeuli

| FB | 15 | Tanner Vili |
| RW | 14 | Lome Fa'atau |
| OC | 13 | Romi Ropati |
| IC | 12 | Brian Lima |
| LW | 11 | Sailosi Tagicakibau |
| FH | 10 | Earl Va'a |
| SH | 9 | Steven So'oialo |
| N8 | 8 | Semo Sititi (c) |
| OF | 7 | Maurie Fa'asavalu |
| BF | 6 | Peter Poulos |
| RL | 5 | Leo Lafaiali'i |
| LL | 4 | Opeta Palepoi |
| TP | 3 | Jeremy Tomuli |
| HK | 2 | Jonathan Meredith |
| LP | 1 | Kas Lealamanua |
Replacements:
| HK | 16 | Mahonri Schwalger |
| PR | 17 | Tamato Leupolu |
| N8 | 18 | Kitiona Viliamu |
| FL | 19 | Des Tuiavi'i |
| SH | 20 | Denning Tyrell |
| CE | 21 | Dale Rasmussen |
| WG | 22 | Dominic Fe'aunati |
Coach:
(New Zealand) John Boe

=== England vs Uruguay ===
2 November 2003

| England | 111–13 | Uruguay |
| Try: Moody; Lewsey (5); Balshaw (2); Catt (2); Gomarsall (2); Luger; Abbott; Robinson (2); Greenwood; Con: Grayson (11); Catt (2) | Report | Try: Lemoine; Con: Menchaca; Pen: Menchaca (2) |

Suncorp Stadium, Brisbane
Attendance: 46,233
Referee: Nigel Williams (Wales)

| FB | 15 | Josh Lewsey |
| RW | 14 | Iain Balshaw |
| OC | 13 | Stuart Abbott |
| IC | 12 | Mike Catt |
| LW | 11 | Dan Luger |
| FH | 10 | Paul Grayson |
| SH | 9 | Andy Gomarsall |
| N8 | 8 | Lawrence Dallaglio |
| OF | 7 | Lewis Moody |
| BF | 6 | Joe Worsley |
| RL | 5 | Danny Grewcock |
| LL | 4 | Martin Corry |
| TP | 3 | Phil Vickery (c) |
| HK | 2 | Dorian West |
| LP | 1 | Jason Leonard |
Replacements:
| HK | 16 | Steve Thompson |
| PR | 17 | Julian White |
| LK | 18 | Martin Johnson |
| LK | 19 | Ben Kay |
| SH | 20 | Kyran Bracken |
| CE | 21 | Will Greenwood |
| WG | 22 | Jason Robinson |
Coach:
Clive Woodward

| FB | 15 | Juan Menchaca |
| RW | 14 | Joaquin Pastore |
| OC | 13 | Diego Aguirre (c) |
| IC | 12 | Joaquín de Freitas |
| LW | 11 | José Viana |
| FH | 10 | Sebastián Aguirre |
| SH | 9 | Juan Campomar |
| N8 | 8 | Rodrigo Capó Ortega |
| OF | 7 | Nicolás Grille |
| BF | 6 | Nicolas Brignoni |
| RL | 5 | Juan Álvarez |
| LL | 4 | Juan Carlos Bado |
| TP | 3 | Pablo Lemoine |
| HK | 2 | Diego Lamelas |
| LP | 1 | Eduardo Berruti |
Replacements:
| HK | 16 | Juan Andrés Pérez |
| PR | 17 | Rodrigo Sánchez |
| PR | 18 | Guillermo Storace |
| LK | 19 | Juan Alzueta |
| LK | 20 | Marcelo Gutierrez |
| SH | 21 | Emiliano Caffera |
| FB | 22 | Diego Reyes |
Coach:
Diego Ormaechea
