= 2005 Japan rugby union tour of South America =

Summary
P	W	D	L
Total
2	0	0	2
Test match
2	0	0	2
Opponent
P	W	D	L
Uruguay
1	0	0	1
Argentina
1	0	0	1

The 2005 Japan rugby union tour of South America was a series of matches played in April 2005 in Uruguay and Argentina by Japan national rugby union team.

== Matches ==
In the first match, eight Japanese players made their debut.

16 April 2005

Uruguay	24–18	Japan
Try: Dugonjic, Perez del Castillo 3 Con: Perez del Castillo 2		Try: Loamanu, Ohata; Con: Morita; Pen: Morita; Drop: Morita

Luis Franzini, Montevideo
Attendance: 5,000
Referee: Leonardo Borghi (Argentina)

Uruguay: 15. Agustin Perez del Castillo, 14. Carlos Baldassari, 13. Joaquin Pastore, 12. Hilario Canessa, 11. Ivo Dugonjic, 10. Diego Aguirre, 9. Juan Campomar (c), 8. Ignacio Conti, 7. Nicolas Grille, 6. Alfredo Giuria, 5. Juan Alzueta, 4.Rafael Alvarez, 3. Federico Capo Ortega, 2. Juan Andres Perez, 1. Diego Lamelas – Replacements: 16. Rodrigo Sanchez, 17. Diego Silveira, 18. Luis Ara, 19. Marcelo Gutierrez
Japan: 15. Goshi Tachikawa, 14. Christian Loamanu, 13. Daisuke Ohata, 12. Reuben Parkinson, 11. Hirotoki Onozawa, 10. Kyohei Morita, 9. Wataru Murata, 8. Takuro Miuchi (c), 7. Tomoaki Nakai, 6. Hare Makiri, 5. Jamie Washington, 4. Takanori Kumagae, 3. Ryo Yamamura, 2. Ken Tsukagoshi, 1.Hiroshi Takahashi – Replacements: 17. Shigeyasu Takagi, 19. Takeomi Ito, 20. Shota Goto, 21. Yukio Motoki, 22. Ayumu Goromaru, 23. Kenji Kasai – Unused: 16. Masakazu Nakabayashi, 18. Hitoshi Ono

In the second match, Japan meet a young and inexperienced Argentinian team, with three debuts (Avramovic, Creevy and Leguizamón), and without several of their players who played at European clubs. The result was a whitewash with Argentina easily winning by 32 points.

23 April 2005

Argentina	68–36	Japan
Try: Albina, Ayerza; Bosch, Genoud 2 Higgs 2, Leguizamón penalty try Con: J. Fernández Miranda 2 Todeschini 5 Pen: Todeschini 3		Try: Motoki, Ohata; Onozawa, Tachikawa; Con: Morita 2 Pen: Morita 3 Drop: Morita

Stadium of B.A. C & R, Buenos Aires
Attendance: 5,000
Referee: Dave Pearson (England)

Argentina: 15. Federico Serra Miras, 14. Fernando Higgs, 13. Miguel Avramovic, 12. Francisco Leonelli Morey, 11. Francisco Bosch, 10. Federico Todeschini, 9. Nicolás Fernández Miranda, 8. Augusto Petrilli, 7. Juan Manuel Leguizamón, 6. Federico Andres Genoud, 5. Manuel Carizza, 4. Pablo Bouza, 3. Eusebio Guiñazú, 2. Alberto Vernet Basualdo, 1. Marcos Ayerza – Replacements: 16. Francisco Lecot, 17. Pablo Henn, 18. Gerardo Lazcano Miranda, 19. Agustin Creevy, 20. Matías Albina, 21. Juan Fernández Miranda, 22. Gonzalo Tiesi
Japan: 15. Goshi Tachikawa, 14. Daisuke Ohata, 13. Reuben Parkinson, 12. Yukio Motoki, 11. Hirotoki Onozawa, 10. Kyohei Morita, 9. Wataru Murata, 8. Takuro Miuchi (c), 7. Hitoshi Ono, 6. Hare Makiri, 5. Jamie Washington, 4. Takanori Kumagae, 3. Ryo Yamamura, 2. Ken Tsukagoshi, 1.Hiroshi Takahashi – Replacements: 17. Kenji Kasai, 18. Ryota Asano Inose, 19. Takeomi Ito, 20. Shota Goto – Unused: 16. Masakazu Nakabayashi, 21. Ayumu Goromaru, 22. Christian Loamanu
