= 2005 Samoa rugby union tour of Australia and New Zealand =

Summary
P	W	D	L
Total
4	1	0	3
Test match
1	0	0	1
Opponent
P	W	D	L
Australia
1	0	0	1

The 2005 Samoa rugby union tour of Australia and New Zealand was a series of matches played in June 2005 in Australia and New Zealand by the Samoa national rugby union team. It was a very experimental team, with nine debuts in an international test.

== Results ==
=== Week 1 ===
The Samoans won their opening mid-week tour match against New South Wales Country before being thrashed by the Wallabies in Sydney.

8 June 2005

NSW Country (New South Wales)	0–39	Western Samoa XV

Sydney

11 June 2005

Australia	74–7	Western Samoa
Try: Chisholm, Elsom; Latham, Mortlock (2); Rathbone, Rogers; Sailor (2), Sharpe(2), Con: Giteau (5), Mortlock (2)		Try: Fanolua; Con: Talapusi

Stadium Australia, Sydney
Referee: Lyndon Bray (New Zealand)

Team details
Australia: 15.Chris Latham, 14.Wendell Sailor, 13.Stirling Mortlock, 12.Morgan Turinui, 11.Clyde Rathbone, 10.Matt Giteau, 9.Chris Whitaker, 8.David Lyons, 7.George Smith, 6.Rocky Elsom, 5.Nathan Sharpe (capt), 4.Mark Chisholm, 3.Matt Dunning, 2.Jeremy Paul, 1.Bill Young, – replacements: 16.Stephen Moore, 17.Nic Henderson, 18.Hugh McMeniman, 19.John Roe, 20.Matt Henjak, 21.Stephen Larkham, 22.Mat Rogers

Samoa: 15.Apoua Stewart, 14.Lome Fa'atau, 13.Terry Fanolua, 12.Brian Lima (yellow card) , 11.Alesana Tuilagi, 10.Tanner Vili, 9.Lualua Vailoaloa, 8.Semo Sititi (capt), 7.Iva Motusaga, 6.Simaika Mikaele, 5.Leo Lafaiali'i, 4.Opeta Palepoi, 3.Census Johnston, 2.Jonathan Meredith, 1.Justin Va'a, – replacements: 16.Trevor Leota, 17.Jamie Parkinson, 18.Daniel Leo, 19.Paul Tupai (yellow card) , 20.Notise Tauafao, 21.Faletoese Talapusi, 22.George Leaupepe

=== Week 2 ===
Samoa completed their short tour of Australia with a 40–25 loss to the Northern Territory Mosquitoes in Darwin, before travelling home via New Zealand, where they were defeated by North Harbour.

18 June 2005

Northern Territory	40–25	Western Samoa XV

Darwin

22 June 2005

North Harbour (New Zealand)	18–10	Western Samoa XV

North Harbour, Albany, NZ
