= Spain at the Rugby World Cup =

Spain's only Rugby World Cup appearance was in 1999 when they competed in Pool A against South Africa (Springboks), Scotland and Uruguay. Spain lost all three games, and finished the tournament ranked 18th out of 20 teams.

They qualified for both the 2019 World Cup in Japan and the 2023 World Cup hosted in France. However, Spain was later disqualified due to fielding an ineligible player and falsification of a copy of an ineligible player's passport respectively.

Spain has not hosted any Rugby World Cup games.

== By position ==
| Rugby World Cup record | | | | | | | | | Qualification | | | | | | |
| Year | Round | Pld | W | D | L | PF | PA | Squad | Pos | Pld | W | D | L | PF | PA |
|---|---|---|---|---|---|---|---|---|---|---|---|---|---|---|---|
| (New Zealand) (Australia) 1987 | Not invited | | | | | | | | – | | | | | | |
| (England) (France) (Ireland) (Scotland) (Wales) 1991 | Did not qualify | | | | | | | | 3rd | 6 | 4 | 0 | 2 | 144 | 91 |
| (South Africa) 1995 | Did not qualify | | | | | | | | 2nd | 5 | 4 | 0 | 1 | 179 | 94 |
| (Wales) 1999 | Pool stage | 3 | 0 | 0 | 3 | 18 | 122 | Squad | 2nd | 6 | 5 | 0 | 1 | 182 | 144 |
| (Australia) 2003 | Did not qualify | | | | | | | | P/O | 9 | 3 | 0 | 6 | 158 | 359 |
| (France) 2007 | Did not qualify | | | | | | | | 3rd | 14 | 11 | 1 | 2 | 528 | 224 |
| (New Zealand) 2011 | Did not qualify | | | | | | | | 5th | 10 | 2 | 0 | 8 | 145 | 304 |
| (England) 2015 | Did not qualify | | | | | | | | 4th | 10 | 2 | 2 | 6 | 159 | 243 |
| (Japan) 2019 | Expelled from competing at tournament after qualification | | | | | | | | 4th | 8 | 6 | 0 | 2 | 217 | 85 |
| (France) 2023 | Expelled from competing at tournament after qualification | | | | | | | | 4th | 10 | 6 | 0 | 4 | 334 | 244 |
| (Australia) 2027 | Qualified | | | | | | | | 2nd | 3 | 2 | 0 | 1 | 128 | 99 |
| (United States) 2031 | To be determined | | | | | | | | To be determined | | | | | | |
| Total | — | 3 | 0 | 0 | 3 | 18 | 122 | — | — | 81 | 45 | 3 | 33 | 2174 | 1887 |
Champions; Runners–up; Third place; Fourth place; Home venue

== Qualifying ==
- 1987 Rugby World Cup – Not invited
- 1991 Rugby World Cup – Did not qualify.
- 1995 Rugby World Cup – Did not qualify.
- 1999 Rugby World Cup – Qualified as Europe 6 by beating Portugal 21–17.
- 2003 Rugby World Cup – Did not qualify. Spain lost to the United States 120–26 in aggregate in a two-match repechage.
- 2007 Rugby World Cup – Did not qualify. Spain lost to Romania 43-20 and Georgia 37-23 during European qualification.
- 2011 Rugby World Cup – Did not qualify. Spain finished 5th with a 2–8 record in the qualifying tournament, the 2008-10 European Nations Cup.
- 2015 Rugby World Cup – Did not qualify.
- 2019 Rugby World Cup – Disqualification due to fielding an ineligible player.
- 2023 Rugby World Cup – Disqualification for falsifying the passport of an ineligible player.
- 2027 Rugby World Cup – Qualified as second in Pool A by beating Switzerland 13–43.

== By matches ==
=== 1999 Rugby World Cup ===
Pool A matches

| Team | Pld | W | D | L | PF | PA | PD | Pts |
|---|---|---|---|---|---|---|---|---|
| South Africa | 3 | 3 | 0 | 0 | 132 | 35 | +97 | 9 |
| Scotland | 3 | 2 | 0 | 1 | 120 | 58 | +62 | 7 |
| Uruguay | 3 | 1 | 0 | 2 | 42 | 97 | −55 | 5 |
| Spain | 3 | 0 | 0 | 3 | 18 | 122 | −104 | 3 |

2 October 1999

| Uruguay | 27 – 15 | Spain |
| Tries: Diego Ormaechea, Alfonso Cardoso, Juan Menchaca; Con: Diego Aguirre, Federico Sciarra; Pen: Diego Aguirre | | Pen: Andrei Kovalenco (5) |

Netherdale, Galashiels
Referee: Chris White (England)

10 October 1999

| South Africa | 47 – 3 | Spain |
| Tries: André Vos (2), Anton Leonard, Pieter Muller, Bob Skinstad, Werner Swanepoel; Con: Jannie de Beer (6) | | Pen: Ferran Velazco Querol |

Murrayfield, Edinburgh
Referee: Paul Honiss (New Zealand)

16 October 1999

| Scotland | 48 – 0 | Spain |
| Tries: Cameron Mather (2), James McLaren, Shaun Longstaff, Duncan Hodge, Cameron Murray; Con: Duncan Hodge (5); Pen: Duncan Hodge |

Murrayfield, Edinburgh
Referee: Clayton Thomas (Wales)

== Overall record ==
| Country | Pld | W | D | L | F | A | +/- | % |
|---|---|---|---|---|---|---|---|---|
| Uruguay | 1 | - | - | 1 | 15 | 27 | -12 | 0 |
| South Africa | 1 | - | - | 1 | 3 | 47 | -44 | 0 |
| Scotland | 1 | - | - | 1 | 0 | 48 | -48 | 0 |
| TOTAL | 3 | - | - | 3 | 18 | 122 | -104 | 0 |

== Team Records ==
Most Points Scored

- 15 vs Uruguay 1999
- 3 vs South Africa 1999

Most Points Conceded

- 48 vs Scotland 1999
- 47 vs South Africa 1999
- 27 vs Uruguay 1999

Worst Losing Margin

- 48 vs Scotland 1999
- 44 vs South Africa 1999
- 12 vs Uruguay 1999

== Individual Records ==
Most Points

- 15 Andrei Kovalenco
- 3 Ferran Velazco Querol

Most Points in a Game

- 15 Andrei Kovalenco vs Uruguay
- 3 Ferran Velazco Querol vs South Africa

Most Tries

Most Drop Goals

- 1 Ferran Velazco Querol

== Bibliography ==
- Davies, Gerald (2004) The History of the Rugby World Cup (Sanctuary Publishing Ltd, (ISBN 1860746020)
- Farr-Jones, Nick, (2003). Story of the Rugby World Cup, Australian Post Corporation, (ISBN 0-642-36811-2)
