= 2007 Italy rugby union tour of South America =

Summary
P	W	D	L
Total
2	1	0	1
Test match
2	1	0	1
Opponent
P	W	D	L
Uruguay
1	1	0	0
Argentina
1	0	0	1

The 2007 Italy rugby union tour of South America was a series of matches played in June 2007 in South America by Italy national rugby union team.

== Results ==
2 June 2007

Uruguay	5–29	Italy
Try: Arocena	report	Try: Agüero, Pratichetti 3 Con: Burton 3 Pen: Burton

Estadio Gran Parque Central, Montevideo
Referee: Rob Debney (England)

Uruguay			Italy
Mathias Arocena	FB	15	FB	Kris Burton
Nicolas Morales	W	14	W	Kaine Robertson
Joaquin Pastore	C	13	C	Enrico Patrizio
Juan Martin Llovet	C	12	C	Cristian Stoica
Francisco Bulanti	W	11	W	Matteo Pratichetti
Martin Crosa	FH	10	FH	Roland de Marigny
Juan Labat	SH	9	SH	Paul Griffen
(capt.) Ignacio Conti	N8	8	N8	Alessandro Zanni
Ignacio Lussich	F	7	F	Robert Barbieri
Alfredo Giuria	F	6	F	Josh Sole
Carlos Protasi	L	5	L	Valerio Bernabò
Juan Alzueta (yellow card)	L	4	L	Carlo Del Fava
Mario Sagario Cagnani	P	3	P	Fabio Staibano
Carlos Arboleya Sarazola	H	2	H	Carlo Festuccia
Rodrigo Sanchez	P	1	P	Andrea Lo Cicero (capt.)
		Replacements
(substituted on) Ivo Dugonjic	W	16	H	Fabio Ongaro (substituted on)
(substituted on) Roberto Pose	L	17	P	Matías Agüero (substituted on)
(substituted on) Santiago Ariano	F	18	F	Roberto Mandelli (substituted on)
(substituted on) Sebastian Levaggi	P	19	F	Silvio Orlando (substituted on)
(substituted on) Gaston Szabo	P	20	UB	Ezio Galon (substituted on)
(substituted on) Martin Espiga	H	21	UB	Alessio Galante (substituted on)
(substituted on) Manuel Martinez	SH	22	FB	David Bortolussi (substituted on)
		Coaches
(Uruguay) Brancato and Berruti				Pierre Berbizier (France)

9 June 2007

Argentina	24–6	Italy
Try: Leonelli, Serra Miras; Con: Serra Miras; Pen: Serra Miras 4	report	Pen: Bortolussi 2

Estadio Malvinas Argentinas, Mendoza
Attendance: 25,000
Referee: Lyndon Bray (New Zealand)

Argentina			Italy
Federico Serra Miras	FB	15	FB	David Bortolussi
Horacio Agulla	W	14	W	Kaine Robertson
Martín Gaitán	C	13	C	Alessio Galante
Manuel Contepomi	C	12	C	Cristian Stoica
Francisco Leonelli	W	11	W	Matteo Pratichetti
Marcelo Bosch	FH	10	FH	Kris Burton
Nicolás Fernández Miranda	SH	9	SH	Pablo Canavosio
Juan Manuel Leguizamón	N8	8	N8	Robert Barbieri
Juan Martín Fernández Lobbe	F	7	F	Roberto Mandelli
(capt.) Martín Durand	F	6	F	Josh Sole (yellow card)
Manuel Carizza	L	5	L	Valerio Bernabò
Ignacio Fernández Lobbe	L	4	L	Carlo Del Fava
Omar Hasan	P	3	P	Carlos Nieto
Pablo Gambarini	H	2	H	Fabio Ongaro
Pablo Henn	P	1	P	Andrea Lo Cicero (capt.) (yellow card)
		Replacements
(substituted on) Eusebio Guiñazú	P	16	H	Carlo Festuccia (substituted on)
(substituted on) Santiago González Bonorino	P	17	P	Matías Agüero (substituted on)
(substituted on) Rimas Álvarez Kairelis	L	18	P	Fabio Staibano (substituted on)
(substituted on) Martín Schusterman	F	19	L	Antonio Pavanello (substituted on)
Nicolas Vergallo		20	F	Silvio Orlando (substituted on)
(substituted on) Juan Fernández Miranda	FH	21	SH	Paul Griffen (substituted on)
Tomás de Vedia		22	UB	Ezio Galon (substituted on)
		Coaches
(Argentina) Marcelo Loffreda				Pierre Berbizier (France)
