= Storace =

Storace is a surname. Notable people with the surname include:

- Bernardo Storace (fl. 1664), Italian composer
- Stefano Storace (1725 – 1781) Italian contrabassist, father of Stephen and Nancy
- Stephen Storace (1762–1796), English composer
- Nancy Storace (born Anna Selina Storace, 1765–1817), operatic singer, sister of Stephen
- Marc Storace (born 1951), Maltese rock vocalist (lives in Switzerland)
- Francesco Storace (born 1959), Italian politician
- Guillermo Storace (born 1974), a forward of the Uruguay national rugby union team
- Patricia Storace (fl. 1993), American poet and essayist
