= Sebastián Aguirre =

Sebastián Aguirre may refer to:

- Sebastián Aguirre (actor) (born 1998), Mexican actor
- Sebastián Aguirre (rugby union) (born 1976), Uruguayan rugby union player
