= Kasiano =

Kasiano may refer to:

- Sam Kasiano, a New Zealand rugby league footballer
- Kasiano "Kas" Lealamanua, a Samoan rugby union footballer
