= Rodrigo Sánchez =

Rodrigo Sánchez may refer to:

- Rodrigo Sánchez (rugby union), Uruguayan rugby union player
- Rodrigo Sánchez (tennis), Peruvian tennis player
- Rodrigo Sánchez Mercado, Roman Catholic prelate
- Rodrigo Sánchez de Arévalo, Spanish churchman, historian and political theorist
