= Juan Álvarez (disambiguation) =

Juan Álvarez (1790–1867) was a Mexican general and 1855 president of Mexico.

Juan Álvarez or Juan Alvarez may also refer to:

== Politics and law ==
- Juan Álvarez Mendizábal (1790–1853), Spanish economist and politician
- Juan Álvarez de Lorenzana, 10th Viscount of Barrantes (1818–1883), Spanish colonial politician
- Juan Álvarez (historian) (1878–1954), Argentine judge and historian

== Sports ==
=== Association football (soccer) ===
- Juan Álvarez (footballer, born 1942) (1942–2023), Chilean footballer
- Juan Álvarez (footballer, born 1948), Mexican footballer
- Juan Carlos Álvarez (Colombian footballer) (born 1966), Colombian football manager and former midfielder
- Juan Carlos Álvarez (Spanish footballer) (born 1954), Spanish football manager and former midfielder
- Juan Álvarez (footballer, born February 1996), Argentine footballer, currently playing for Club Atlético Banfield
- Juan Álvarez (footballer, born July 1996), Mexican footballer, currently playing for C.F. Monterrey
- Juan Álvarez (footballer, born 1997), Argentine footballer, currently playing for Chacarita Juniors
- Juan Alvarez (soccer) (born 2004), American soccer player

=== Other sports ===
- Juan Alvarez (baseball) (born 1973), American Major League Baseball pitcher
- Juan Álvarez (rugby union) (born 1980), Uruguayan rugby union player
- Juan Cruz Álvarez (born 1985), Argentine race car driver

== Others ==
- Juan Álvarez de Toledo (1488–1577), Spanish Dominican and cardinal
- Juan Álvarez de Eulate y Ladrón de Cegama (1583–1655), Spanish colonialist
- Juan Álvarez (writer) (born 1978), Colombian short story writer
- Juan Manuel Álvarez (Glendale train crash) (born 1979), American convicted of causing the 2005 Glendale train crash
- Security Chief Juan Alvarez, a fictional character in The Moon Is a Harsh Mistress
