= Peter Poulos =

Peter Poulos may refer to:

- Peter Poulos (rugby union)
- Peter Poulos (politician)
