= Juan Carlos Bado =

Uruguayan rugby union player

Juan Carlos Bado (born Montevideo, 29 December 1973) is a former Uruguayan rugby union player. He played as a lock.

He first started with Old Boys until moving to France, where he represented Union Bordeaux Bègles, in 2002/03, Stade Français, from 2003/04 to 2004/05, winning the Pro D2 in 2004/05, US Montauban, from 2005/06 to 2006/07, Oyonnax Rugby, from 2007/08 to 2012/13. He plays for Rugby Club Bassin d'Arcachon since 2013/14.

An emblematic player for Uruguay, Bado had 49 caps, with 2 tries scored, 10 points in aggregate, since his first match, a 67-3 win over Paraguay, on 2 October 1993, in Asunción, for the 1995 Rugby World Cup qualifyings, aged 19 years old. Bado played all the three matches at the 1999 Rugby World Cup and all the four matches at the 2003 World Cup for Uruguay, remaining scoreless.

After a three years absence, he returned to the National Team for the 2007 Rugby World Cup qualifyings, being sent-off in the 18-12 win over Portugal, at 24 March 2007, in Montevideo, who still wasn't enough to secure the qualification to the finals. Once again, he would be called for the 2011 Rugby World Cup qualifyings, playing in the 44-7 win over Kazakhstan at 17 July 2010, in Montevideo, aged 36 years old. It would be his last game for Uruguay, who would lose the qualification once again in the repechage.

Since his retirement, he has been the forwards coach for the national team, helping them to qualification for the 2015 Rugby World Cup.
