= Denning Tyrell =

- Born: Denning Iosua Tyrell; May 9, 1976 (age 50) Motootua, Samoa

Rugby union career
- Position: Scrum-half
Amateur team(s)
| Years | Team | Apps | (Points) |
- Kaierau
| – | Border | | |
| – | Kaierau | | |
| – | Border | | |
| – | Inglewood | | |
Provincial / State sides
| Years | Team | Apps | (Points) |
| 1997-2000 | Wanganui | 16 | (10) |
| 2001-2003 | Taranaki | 22 | (24) |
| 2005-2012 | Wanganui | 92 | (182) |
International career
| Years | Team | Apps | (Points) |
| 2000-2003 | Samoa | 13 | (0) |

Denning Iosua Tyrell (born May 9, 1976 in Motootua) is a Samoan rugby union player. He plays as a scrum-half.

== Career ==
He debuted for Samoa in 2000, against Fiji, at Apia, on June 3, 2000. He was part of the 2003 Rugby World Cup roster, where the match against South Africa at Brisbane. He also played for Wanganui and Taranaki in the NPC.
