= Akvsenti Giorgadze =

Georgia international rugby union player

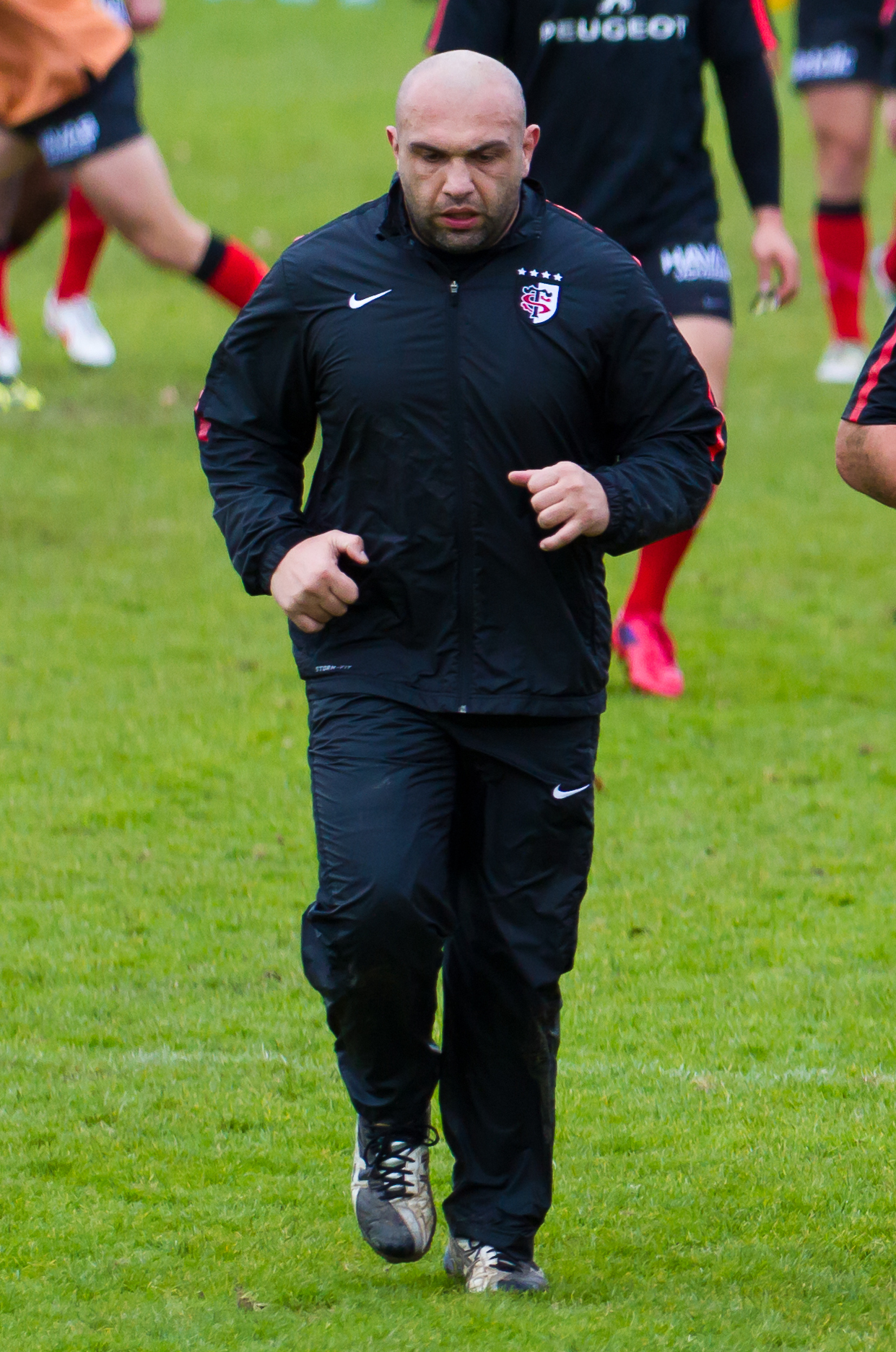
- Born: Akvsenti Giorgadze; 4 June 1976 (age 50) Kutaisi, Georgian SSR, Soviet Union
- Height: 1.80 m (5 ft 11 in)
- Weight: 110 kg (17 st 5 lb; 243 lb)
- Notable relative: Irakli Giorgadze (brother)

Rugby union career
- Position: Hooker
Senior career
Years	Team	Apps	(Points)
2001-2002	Toulon		
2002-2005	Rovigo		
2005-2011	Castres	94	(25)
2011	Mazamet		
2011-2012	Toulouse	2	(0)
2012	Tournefeuille		
- Correct as of 30 October 2012
International career
Years	Team	Apps	(Points)
1996–2011	Georgia	64	(60)
- Correct as of 25 March 2019

Akvsent Guiorgadze (Georgian: აქვსენტი გიორგაძე; born 4 June 1976 in Kutaisi, Georgian SSR, Soviet Union) is a Georgian rugby union player. He plays as a hooker.

Guiorgadze played for Toulouse, in 2011/12, and now plays for Tournefeuille, in France. He is an international player for the Georgian national team. Guiorgadze made his debut for Georgia on 12 April 1996 in a match against Czech Republic. Guiorgadze has played 64 times for his country, scoring 12 tries. Guiorgadze represented Georgia at the 2003, 2007 and 2011 World Cups. Akvsenti is the older brother of Irakli, fellow international rugby player.
