= Martín Mendaro =

Uruguayan rugby union player

Martín Mendaro (born 1 August 1973 in Montevideo) is a former Uruguayan rugby union player and a current coach. He played as a centre.

He played for Carrasco Polo Club in the Campeonato Uruguayo de Rugby.

He had 47 caps for Uruguay, from 1992 to 2003, scoring 4 tries, 20 points on aggregate. He was called for the 1999 Rugby World Cup, playing in two games, without scoring. He would be called once again for the 2003 Rugby World Cup, where he played in three games, remaining scoreless.

After finishing his player career, he became a coach. He was first head coach at Carrasco Polo Club, joining Trébol Paysandú in 2017/18, where he won the Campeonato Uruguayo de Rugby the same season.
