= John Boe =

New Zealand rugby union footballer and coach

John Boe (born 23 November 1955) is a New Zealand former rugby union footballer and a current coach. He played as a centre, before moving to fly-half.

He played for Waikato Colts, but never had a competitive game for the All Blacks, despite being selected for his tour of France, in 1981.

Boe started his coach career with Waikato Colts, being their head coach from 1995 to 1998. He reached the NPC final in the final season.

Being a member of NZRFU staff, he was loaned to Manu Samoa, in 2000, winning then the Pacific Rim Tournament. He also achieved the qualification for the 2003 Rugby World Cup finals, where his team won two matches, with Uruguay and Georgia, and had two honourable losses to England and South Africa, finishing in 3rd place of his group.

He left the Samoa Squad soon after, being the Pacific Islanders coach for 2004.

Boe was the head coach of East Coast Aces for the Australian Rugby Championship in 2007.

Sporting positions
Preceded by (New Zealand) Bryan Williams	Samoa National Rugby Union Coach; 2000–2003	Succeeded by (New Zealand) Michael Jones
