= Joaquín de Freitas =

Uruguayan rugby union player

Joaquín Ignacio de Freitas (born 21 April 1978) is a former Uruguayan rugby union player. He played as a centre.

He played for Champagnat Rugby Club in the Campeonato Uruguayo de Rugby.

He had 21 caps for Uruguay, from 2000 to 2006, scoring 1 conversion and 2 penalties, 8 points in aggregate. He had his first game at the 23-12 win over Namibia, at 22 September 2000, in Montevideo, in a tour. He was called for the 2003 Rugby World Cup, where he played in two games, one as substitute, but did not score. He had his last cap at the 33-7 loss to the United States, at 7 October 2006, in Stanford, for the 2007 Rugby World Cup qualifyings.
