= Sebastián Aguirre (rugby union) =

Uruguayan rugby union player (born 1976)

Sebastián Sarandi Aguirre (born 15 July 1976 in Montevideo) is a Uruguayan rugby union player. He plays as a fly-half. He is the younger brother of Diego Aguirre, also an international player for the "Teros".

Aguirre currently plays for Carrasco Polo Club. He was suspended for five months in October 2008, after incidents at the match with Old Christians.

He had 28 caps for Uruguay, from 1998 to 2007, scoring 1 try, 3 conversions, 5 penalties and 1 drop goal, 29 points on aggregate.

Aguirre was selected for the 1999 Rugby World Cup, playing a single match, and for the 2003 Rugby World Cup, playing in three matches, but never scoring. He was involved in the 2007 Rugby World Cup qualifyings, lost in the repechage to Portugal, the last time he played for the "Teros".
