= Alberico Passadore =

Uruguay international rugby union player

Alberico Passadore (born 18 March 1960) is a former Uruguayan rugby union footballer and a current coach. He played as a scrum-half.

Passadore had 5 caps for Uruguay, from 1989 to 1995, scoring a try.

He was the head coach of the "Teros" until being forced to leave functions, in October 2008, for professional reasons. His main purpose of qualifying for the 2011 Rugby World Cup finals, was followed by his successor, Argentine Guillermo García Porcel.
