= Kamp Staaldraad =

Boot camp for the South African rugby team

Kamp Staaldraad (Afrikaans words, translated idiomatically as Camp Barbed Wire, though more accurately Camp Steel Wire) was a military-style "boot camp" organized as a "team building" exercise for the South African national rugby union team, the Springboks (or Boks), during their preparation for the 2003 Rugby World Cup (RWC). Details of the camp emerged in the South African media, resulting in protest from the upper administrative levels of South African rugby.

Soon after the naming of the Springboks World Cup team in September 2003, Boks coach Rudolf Straeuli arranged for the team to go to a police camp in the South African bush, near the town of Thabazimbi. He delegated the responsibility for running the team camp. Several members of staff proclaimed the intention was to banish a sense of individuality from players.

Soon after the Boks were eliminated in the quarterfinals of the Rugby World Cup, a South African newspaper reported that before the RWC, the Boks had been sent to a boot camp where players had allegedly been ordered into a freezing lake naked to pump up rugby balls underwater. The story also alleged that players who tried to get out of the lake, including Boks captain Corné Krige, were forced back in at gunpoint. Within days, several South African newspapers ran pictures leaked from the camp, showing players standing naked in the lake and holding rugby balls in front of their private parts, and shivering Boks players huddled naked in a pit. The whistleblower emerged as Boks video analyst Dale McDermott.

In the days that followed, the media reported other details from the camp:

- The team was ordered to climb into a foxhole naked and sing the national anthem while ice-cold water were being poured over their heads. During their time in the hole, recordings of God Save the Queen (used as England's national anthem) and the New Zealand All Blacks haka were played at full volume.
- It was confirmed that firearms were present at the camp, although reports varied as to whether they were ever pointed at anyone.
- The players were forced to crawl naked across gravel.
- They also were ordered to spend a night in the bush, during which they were to kill and cook chickens, but not eat them.
- The players had to participate in bare-knuckle fights with each other.

Most South Africans condemned Kamp Staaldraad, including the South African military forces; a spokesman for the South African National Defence Force pointedly told the Cape Times newspaper that the force never trained its recruits naked, and he knew of no military organization in the world that did so. Many rugby observers also pointed out that trying to eliminate all individuality from a team could be counterproductive, as there are many times during a rugby match when individual initiative can make the difference between victory and defeat.

At the 2003 World Cup, South Africa had a disappointing campaign, for the first time not reaching the semi-finals. Schalk Burger felt the camp destroyed the team spirit and Stefan Terblanche felt the camp ruined all of the physical preparations the players had been making, and meant they were not in a fit state for the World Cup, although Juan Smith took positives from his experience.

Straeuli defended the camp as more details became public, but eventually resigned. Higher-ups in the country's rugby establishment initially refused to distance themselves from Kamp Staaldraad; many of them were purged at the same time as Straeuli. The Boks' disappointing results in 2003 (early exit from the RWC; record losses to France, England, Scotland, and New Zealand; a last-minute win over Argentina) were enough by themselves to threaten the jobs of Straeuli and many rugby executives. However, their attempts to defend Kamp Staaldraad apparently were the last straw for many South African rugby supporters, and for many within the rugby establishment who saw the need for dramatic change.

In a tragic postscript to the story, McDermott was found dead from a bullet wound to the head at his home in Durban on 9 January 2005. His death was eventually determined to be a suicide; no foul play had been suspected. McDermott's mother reported that he had suffered extreme clinical depression in the months leading to his death. After supplying the images that led to the controversy, he was forced to leave his job at the South African Council for Scientific and Industrial Research (from which he had been contracted out to the Boks) and returned to teaching at Durban High School. Jake White, who took over as Boks coach after the forced resignation of Straeuli, tried to bring McDermott back into the Boks staff, but SA Rugby vetoed the re-appointment.
