= Bernardo Amarillo =

Uruguayan rugby union player

Bernardo Amarillo (born 14 January 1978) is an Uruguayan rugby union player. He played as a scrum-half.

Amarillo played for Carrasco Polo Club, in Uruguay.

He had 24 caps for Uruguay, from 1998 to 2003, scoring 3 tries, 3 conversions, 4 penalties and 1 drop goal, 36 points on aggregate. He was called for the 2003 Rugby World Cup, playing in three games but remaining scoreless. He played at, Harlequins, Carrasco Polo club, Le tour, Le parpadelle and Farfeu
