= Kitiona Viliamu =

Samoa international rugby union player

- Born: 27 September 1980 (age 46) Wellington, New Zealand
- Height: 6 ft 3 in (1.91 m)
- Weight: 243 lb (110 kg)
- School: St Joseph's College, Samoa. Wesley College, New Zealand

Rugby union career
- Position(s): Lock, Flanker
Amateur team(s)
Years	Team	Apps	(Points)
–	Pukekohe RFC		
–	Papakura RFC		
Senior career
Years	Team	Apps	(Points)
2003	Manchester R.F.C.		
Provincial / State sides
Years	Team	Apps	(Points)
2001–2003	Counties Manukau	8	(10)
International career
Years	Team	Apps	(Points)
2001–2004	Samoa	10	(5)

Kitiona Villiamu (born Wellington, 27 September 1980) is a New Zealand-born Samoan rugby union player. He played as lock and flanker.

== Career ==
He first played for Samoa in a test against Ireland, at Lansdowne Road, on 11 November 2001. He was part of the 2003 Rugby World Cup roster, where he played four matches as substitute. His last international cap was against Scotland, at Wellington, on 4 June 2004. In his club career, he played for Counties Manukau in the NPC between 2001 and 2003, and in 2003 he moved to Manchester R.F.C.
