= Jeremy Tomuli =

Samoa international rugby union player

- Born: Jeremy S. Tomuli; 13 October 1971 (age 55) Auckland, New Zealand
- Height: 6 ft 3 in (1.91 m)
- Weight: 238 lb (108 kg)

Rugby union career
- Position: Prop
- Current team: Entente Vallée de l'Escou
Amateur team(s)
Years	Team	Apps	(Points)
–	Papakura RFC		
Senior career
Years	Team	Apps	(Points)
1999–2004	US Colomiers		
2004–2007	Aviron Bayonnais		
2007–2008	SU Agen		
2008–2010	Section Paloise		
2010–2016	FC Oloron		
2016	Entente Vallée de l'Escou		
Provincial / State sides
Years	Team	Apps	(Points)
1997–1999	Counties Manukau	19	(0)
International career
Years	Team	Apps	(Points)
2001–2006	Samoa	14	(0)

Jeremy S. Tomuli (born 13 October 1971 in Auckland) is a New Zealand-born Samoan rugby union player. He plays as a prop. He played for FC Oloron until 2016, when he started to play for Escou.

== Career ==
His first international cap was against Ireland, at Lansdowne Road, on 11 November 2001. He was also part of the 2003 Rugby World Cup roster, where he played 4 matches for Samoa in the tournament. His last cap was against Japan, at New Plymouth, on 17 June 2008. In his international career, he earned 14 caps and 0 points in aggregate.
