= Nicolás Brignoni =

Uruguay international rugby union player

- Born: September 3, 1976 (age 50) Montevideo, Uruguay
- Height: 6 ft 4 in (1.93 m)
- Weight: 235 lb (107 kg)

Rugby union career
- Position: Flanker
Amateur team(s)
Years	Team	Apps	(Points)
-2002	Montevideo Cricket Club		
Senior career
Years	Team	Apps	(Points)
2002-2006	L'Aquila		
2006-2007	Montauban	15	(0)
2007-2010	Oyonnax	53	(25)
2014	UA Libourne	8	(0)
International career
Years	Team	Apps	(Points)
1998-2010	Uruguay	47	(45)

Nicolas Brignoni (born 3 September 1976 in Montevideo) is a former Uruguayan rugby union player, of Swiss origin. He played as a flanker.

== Career ==
Brignoni played in Europe for L'Aquila Rugby, from Italy, from 2002/2003 to 2005/2006, and US Montauban, from France, in 2006/2007. He played for Oyonnax Rugby, another French team, from 2007/08 to 2009/10. He last played for French side UA Libourne in the Fédérale 1, in 2014.

He holds 47 caps with 9 tries scored, 45 points in aggregate, for Uruguay national rugby union team. His first game was at 8 June 1998 in a 72-5 loss to Argentina XV, in Buenos Aires, in a tour. He played four games at the 1999 Rugby World Cup, scoring a try, and three games at the 2003 Rugby World Cup, where he scored an important try against Georgia. He had his last cap at the 21-21 draw with Romania, at 23 November 2010, for the 2011 Rugby World Cup qualification repechage, in Montevideo.
