= Stuart Abbott =

England international rugby union player (born 1978)

Stuart Abbott MBE
- Born: Stuart Abbott; 3 June 1978 (age 48) Cape Town, South Africa
- Height: 1.82 m (6 ft 0 in)
- Weight: 89 kg (14 st 0 lb)
- School: Bishops Diocesan College
- University: Stellenbosch University

Rugby union career
- Position: Centre
- Current team: retired
Senior career
Years	Team	Apps	(Points)
1999	Griffons	25	(30)
1999–2000	Leicester Tigers	2	(0)
2000–2001	Western Province	12	(15)
2001	Stormers	9	(0)
2001–2006	London Wasps	100	(60)
2006–2007	Harlequins		
- Correct as of 25 June 2014
International career
Years	Team	Apps	(Points)
2001	South Africa U23		
2003–2006	England	9	(10)
- Correct as of 25 June 2014

Stuart Richard Abbott MBE (born 3 June 1978) is a South African born rugby union footballer who played centre for London Wasps and England.

Abbott was born in Cape Town, South Africa. His mother was English. He was educated at Western Province Prep School and Bishops, where he says he was caned. Springbok centre Robbie Fleck, and Selborne Boome went to the same school. He took a degree in economics at Stellenbosch University and played for the Northern Free State Griffons in the Currie Cup. He later played for Western Province and South Africa U23

During the 1999 World Cup, Abbott signed for English club Leicester Tigers, who had lost several players to international duty, and made two appearances, on the recommendation of former Tigers and Springbok fly-half Joel Stransky.

In 2001 he played for the South African Super 12 side Stormers. In November 2001 Abbott was signed by English club Wasps. He rocketed to prominence in 2002–03 as a prime force in the team that won the Zurich Premiership, he repeated this for 2003–04 when the club reached the finals of both the Heineken Cup and the end-of-season Zurich Premiership playoffs. Wasps won both finals and Abbott scored a try in both. He formed an exciting centre partnership with Fraser Waters.

He turned down an approach from South Africa coach Rudolf Straeuli prior to the World Cup but decided to play for England. Abbott scored on his England debut when he scored one of the five tries in England's 43–9 Rugby World Cup warm up match with Wales at the Millennium Stadium in August 2003. After impressing again in a pre-World Cup trial against France two weeks later, was selected in England's World Cup squad.

In 2003, he appeared in three Rugby World Cup games, adding a second try in the runaway win over Uruguay. England went on to win the World Cup and with his teammates Abbott was appointed an MBE in the 2004 New Year Honours. He missed out on the 2004 Six Nations Championship through injury but showed his class for his club, earning his call up for the 2004 summer tour. He struggled with injuries after the World Cup and broke his leg in 2005 in a Heineken Cup game between Wasps and Biarritz. He enjoyed a very successful period at London Wasps winning the Heineken Cup, Zurich Premiership and in his last season there, the Powergen Cup.

In 2006, he joined the newly promoted Harlequins for the 2006–07 season, but only made 17 appearances for them. On 24 October 2007 Abbott announced his retirement due to a shoulder injury.

== Post-retirement life ==
In May 2008 Abbott was announced Backs Coach at Rosslyn Park FC, who finished second in the 2008/2009 season.

He subsequently moved back to Cape Town. As of 2025, he was working as a fuel wholesaler.
