= Alessio Galante =

Italy international rugby union player

- Born: 24 October 1983 (age 43) Varese, Italy
- Height: 6 ft 2 in (188 cm)
- Weight: 216 lb (98 kg)

Rugby union career
- Position: Wing
International career
Years	Team	Apps	(Points)
2007	Italy	2	(0)

Alessio Galante (born 24 October 1983) is an Italian former international rugby union player.

Born in Varese, Galante played his rugby primarily on the wing and spent most of his career with Gran Parma, where he started as an under 21s player in the 2002–03 season.

Galante became the first Varese product to be capped for Italy when came on off the bench in a win over Uruguay during their 2007 tour of South America. He subsequently earned a starting berth for Italy's match against Argentina in Mendoza and the following year was a Six Nations squad member.

== See also ==
- List of Italy national rugby union players
