= Claude Saurel =

French rugby union player and coach (1948–2025)

- Born: 17 April 1948 Béziers, France
- Died: 6 April 2025 (aged 76) Mèze, France
- Height: 2.08 m (6 ft 10 in)

Rugby union career
- Position: Flanker
Senior career
Years	Team	Apps	(Points)
- Béziers
Coaching career
- Years: Team
- 1980–1983: Béziers
- 1992–1995: RC Mèze
- –: Morocco
- 1997–2003: Georgia
- 2005–2006: African Leopards
- 2007–2008: Russia
- –: Tunisia
- 2012: Béziers

Claude Saurel (17 April 1948 – 6 April 2025) was a French rugby union footballer and coach.

== Biography ==
Saurel played his rugby for Béziers, with his position being flanker. He later became the national coach of the Morocco national team. In 1997, he was invited to conduct an audit of Georgian rugby, which led to his involvement in the country’s rugby development.

He initially worked with Georgia’s Rugby Sevens team before being appointed head coach of the national team in the summer of 1999. Under his leadership, Georgian rugby experienced significant growth. During the European Nations Cup in 2000, Georgia finished second, narrowly behind Romania.

In 2001, Georgia won all five of their matches in the tournament, topping the table. The team placed second in the 2001–2002 tournament but went on to qualify for the Rugby World Cup for the first time. In the 2003 tournament, they were placed in Pool C alongside powerhouses South Africa and England. Despite heavy defeats to England and Samoa, they gave competitive performances against South Africa and Uruguay.

From 2007 to 2008, Saurel was the coach of the Russia national team. His first match in charge was against his former team, Georgia, who won 31–12.

Saurel died in Mèze on 6 April 2025, at the age of 76.
