= David Bolgashvili =

Georgia international rugby union player

- Born: 19 September 1979 (age 47) Tbilisi, Georgia, USSR
- Height: 6 ft 2 in (188 cm)
- Weight: 217 lb (98 kg)

Rugby union career
- Position: Flanker
International career
Years	Team	Apps	(Points)
2000–10	Georgia	30	(25)

David Bolgashvili (born 19 September 1979) is a Georgian rugby union coach and former international.

Bolgashvili was born in Tbilisi, to parents both in the medical field.

A flanker, Bolgashvili got started in the sport as a 12-year old and at the age of 19 became the first Georgian to be recruited by French club Lille Métropole. He was capped in 30 Tests for Georgia from 2000 to 2010, including three matches at the 2003 Rugby World Cup, which was the country's historic first appearance in the tournament.

Bolgashvili served as head coach of Stade Niçois between 2016 and 2022.

== See also ==
- List of Georgia national rugby union players
