= Giorgi Chkhaidze =

Georgian rugby union player

- Born: August 20, 1981 (age 45) Kutaisi, Georgian SSR, Soviet Union
- Height: 1.95 m (6 ft 5 in)
- Weight: 116 kg (18 st 4 lb; 256 lb)

Rugby union career
- Position(s): Number 8, Flanker, Lock
Senior career
Years	Team	Apps	(Points)
2006-2008	Massy	22	(5)
2008-2009	Racing Métro	12	(5)
2009-2011	Montpellier	22	(10)
2011-2012	Saint-Junien	13	(10)
2012-2014	Tarbes	37	(5)
2014-	Lille MR	17	(10)
- Correct as of 4 September 2015
International career
Years	Team	Apps	(Points)
2002-2017	Georgia	100	(78)
- Correct as of 14 May 2019

Giorgi Chkhaidze (born 20 August 1981 in Tbilisi) is a Georgian rugby union player who plays as a flanker.

He moved to France, where he has played for six clubs—Massy (2006–07), Racing 92 (at the time Racing Métro 92; 2007–2009), where he won the Pro D2 in 2008–09; Montpellier (2009–2011); Saint-Junien (2011–12); Tarbes (2012–14); and currently with Fédérale 1 side Lille (2014–present).

He has 101 caps for Georgia, since his debut, an 88–0 win over Netherlands, in Tbilisi, at 3 February 2002, aged only 19 years old, for the Six Nations B. He counts 4 tries scored, 20 points in aggregate. He was called for the 2003 Rugby World Cup, playing in three matches, the 2007 Rugby World Cup, playing in four matches, and the 2011 Rugby World Cup, once again in four matches. Chkhaidze appeared in his fourth World Cup in 2015.
