= Dominic Fe'aunati =

Samoa international rugby union & league player

- Born: Dominic Fe'aunati; 14 June 1978 (age 48) Wellington, New Zealand
- Height: 1.85 m (6 ft 1 in)
- Weight: 120 kg (18 st 13 lb)

Rugby union career
- Position(s): Centre, Wing
Senior career
Years	Team	Apps	(Points)
-1997	Marist St Pats		
1998–1999	Hutt Old Boys-Marist		
2000–2001	Viadana Stourbridge		
2001	Pontypridd		
2002–2003	Marist St Pats		
2005–2007	London Irish	12	(10)
2007–2008	Worcester	7	(5)
2008–2009	Béziers	8	(0)
2009–2010	Albi	11	(0)
Provincial / State sides
Years	Team	Apps	(Points)
1997–1999	Wellington		
2003	Wellington		
International career
Years	Team	Apps	(Points)
1997	New Zealand U19		
1999	New Zealand U21		
2003	Samoa	5	(25)
- Rugby league career

Playing information
- Position: Wing
Club
Years	Team	Pld	T	G	FG	P
2004	St. Helens	21	8	0	0	32
2005	Leigh	5	1	0	0	4
	Total	26	9	0	0	36

Dominic Fe'aunati (born 14 June 1978) is a Samoan former rugby league and rugby union footballer who last played for SC Albi, as a centre. He is a Samoa rugby union international.

== Background ==
Fe'aunati was born in Wellington, New Zealand.

== Career ==
Feaunati has previously played rugby league for St. Helens and Leigh Centurions in the Super League. He played primarily on the wing. He has also played for Pontypridd RFC, London Irish in the Guinness Premiership in 2005. Feaunati joined Worcester in January 2007 to add power and pace to the back line and became a regular in the first team squad. He then gained a contract in France with the Pro D2 club Béziers and has since moved on to Albi. Feaunati was also an NZ Junior Kiwis U15 in 1993 and represented the NZ U19 rugby union in 1997.

=== National career ===
Feaunati has already won seven caps for Samoa and played against England in the 2003 Rugby World Cup finals before switching codes to the league. Feaunati also played for Barbarians against England in 2006 at Twickenham Stadium before joining Samoa in New Zealand for their NZ tour.
