= Simon Lemalu =

Samoan rugby union player

- Full name: Siuola Simon Lemalu
- Born: 23 January 1981 (age 45) Samoa
- Height: 5 ft 9 in (1.75 m)
- Weight: 260 lb (118 kg)

Rugby union career
- Position: Prop
Amateur team(s)
Years	Team	Apps	(Points)
????	Ardmore Marist		
????	Waiuku		
Senior career
Years	Team	Apps	(Points)
2003-2004	Otahuhu RFC		
2006-2007	CA Brive	5	(0)
Provincial / State sides
Years	Team	Apps	(Points)
2004-2005	Northland	21	(20)
2006-2013	Counties Manukau	76	(8)
Super Rugby
Years	Team	Apps	(Points)
2008	Chiefs	2	(0)
2011	Chiefs Development		
International career
Years	Team	Apps	(Points)
2002	New Zealand U-21	5	(0)
2003-2011	Samoa	13	(5)

Siuola Simon Lemalu (born 23 January 1981) is a Samoan former rugby union player. He played as a prop.

== Career ==
He debuted in the 2003 Rugby World Cup playing his first cap against Uruguay, at Perth, on 15 October 2003. He played three matches in the tournament. His last cap was against Tonga, at Lautoka, on 13 July 2011. He also played for Northland, Counties Manukau, CA Brive and for Chiefs in the Super Rugby 2008 season. He also played for New Zealand Colts in 2002.

He signed with the Parramatta Two Blues for the 2014 season.
