= Juan Andrés Pérez =

Uruguayan rugby union player

Juan Andrés Pérez (born 26 August 1975, in Buenos Aires) is a former Uruguayan rugby union player. He played as a hooker.

He was born in Buenos Aires, Argentina, but decided to represent Uruguay. He played for Old Boys in the Campeonato Uruguayo de Rugby.

He had 32 caps for Uruguay, from 2001 to 2007, scoring 2 tries, 10 points on aggregate. He had his first cap at the 16–14 loss to Spain, at 1 September 2001, in Montevideo, in a tour. He was called for the 2003 Rugby World Cup, playing in all the four games, without scoring. He had his last cap at the 18–12 win over Portugal, at 24 March 2007, in Montevideo, for the 2007 Rugby World Cup qualification repechage.
