= Nicolás Grille =

Uruguay international rugby union player

- Born: 13 December 1974 (age 51) Montevideo, Uruguay

Rugby union career
- Position: Flanker
International career
Years	Team	Apps	(Points)
1996–2007	Uruguay	54	(40)

Nicolás Grille (born 13 December 1974) is a Uruguayan former rugby union international.

Grille was born in Montevideo and raised in the city of Paysandú.

A flanker, Grille represented Uruguay in 54 Test matches from 1996 to 2007. He competed in both the 1999 and 2003 editions of the Rugby World Cup. During his international career, Grille competed locally for Trébol Paysandú. By the time he left international rugby he was playing with Argentine club Hindú.

Grille played his rugby as an amateur and was employed as a sales manager.

== See also ==
- List of Uruguay national rugby union players
