= Guillermo Storace =

Uruguayan rugby union footballer

Guillermo Storace (born 20 March 1974, in Montevideo) is a former Uruguayan rugby union player who played as a prop. He is the current coach of Uruguay U19 and has recently won the South American Junior Rugby Championship.

Storace did his career at Old Christians Club, where he won several titles of National Champion.

He had 48 caps for Uruguay, since 18 September 1996, in a 54-20 loss to Argentina, in Hamilton, for the Pan-American Championship, to 24 March 2007, in an 18-12 win over Portugal, for the 2007 Rugby World Cup repechage. He scored 3 tries during his international career, on an aggregate of 15 points.

Storace was called for the 1999 Rugby World Cup, playing three matches, and for the 2003 Rugby World Cup, playing once again in three matches, but remaining scoreless.
