= Vasil Katsadze =

Georgia international rugby union & league player

- Born: 16 July 1976 (age 50) Potsdam, Germany
- Height: 188 cm (6 ft 2 in)
- Weight: 108 kg (238 lb; 17 st 0 lb)

Rugby union career
- Position(s): Flanker, Winger
Senior career
Years	Team	Apps	(Points)
1999-2000	AS Béziers		
2000-2001	FCS Rumilly		
2001-2002	FC Grenoble		
2004-2006	SC Albi		
- Correct as of 13 July 2024
International career
Years	Team	Apps	(Points)
1997–2005	Georgia	34	(40)
- Correct as of 13 July 2024
National sevens team
Years	Team		Comps
2001-2002	Georgia		
- Correct as of 13 July 2024
- Rugby league career

Playing information
Club
Years	Team	Pld	T	G	FG	P
2002–04	Villefranche XIII Aveyron
2006–07	UVC XIII
	Total	0	0	0	0	0

Vasil Katsadze (Georgian: ვასილ კაცაძე; born Potsdam, 16 July 1976) is a Georgian rugby union and rugby league player. He played as a wing and as a flanker in rugby union.

Katsadze moved to France, where he played in AS Béziers (1999/2000), FCS Rumilly (2000/01), FC Grenoble (2001/02), SC Albi (2004/05-2005/06) and Villefranche XIII Aveyron.

He had 34 caps for Georgia, scoring 8 tries, 40 points on aggregate. He had his first game at the 29–23 win over Poland, at 10 May 1997, in Sopot, for the FIRA Championship. He was called for the 2003 Rugby World Cup, playing in all the four games, two of them as the captain and one of them as a substitute, but without scoring. He had his last game at the 65–0 win over Ukraine, at 26 February 2005, in Tbilisi, for the Six Nations B, scoring a try. He also featured for the Georgia Sevens team.

He soon would change codes for rugby league, so this would be his last rugby union international game, aged only 28 years old. He went to play rugby league for UVC-13, in France, since 2006/07.
