= Leo Lafaiali'i =

Samoan rugby player and coach

- Born: Saveasiuleo Fredrik Lafaiali'i; 30 January 1974 (age 52) Auckland, New Zealand
- Height: 1.96 m (6 ft 5 in)
- Weight: 110 kg (243 lb)

Rugby union career
- Position: Lock
Senior career
Years	Team	Apps	(Points)
2001-2004	Sanyo		
2004-2005	Parma		
2005-2006	Bayonne		
2006-2007	Atlastars		
Provincial / State sides
Years	Team	Apps	(Points)
1996-	Auckland		
Super Rugby
Years	Team	Apps	(Points)
1997–98	Blues	16	(10)
1999	Chiefs	1	(0)
2000–01	Blues	4	(0)
International career
Years	Team	Apps	(Points)
2001-2007	Samoa	27	(0)
2004	Pacific Islanders	1	(0)

Leo Lafaiali'i (born 30 January 1974 in Auckland, New Zealand) is a Samoan rugby union footballer.

== Career ==
Leo Lafaiali'i made his debut for Samoa in 2001 against Tonga, going on to play in Test matches against Fiji, New Zealand, and Tonga later on in the year. After a number of appearances in 2002, he went to the 2003 Rugby World Cup in Australia, playing against Uruguay, Georgia, England, and South Africa. Lafaiali'i toured with the Pacific Islands in 2004 and helped Samoa to qualify for the World Cup in France. He featured in the 2007 Pacific Nations Cup for Samoa and was selected in the Samoa squad to go to the 2007 Rugby World Cup, where he played in his second global tournament.

Earlier in his career he played for Auckland winning national titles in 1996 and 1999. He was selected for the Blues in 1997 and was part of the championship winning side for that season. Drafted to the Chiefs in 1999 he returned to the Blues in 2000 & 2001 before departing to Sanyo in Japan. He has also played for Overmach Parma in Italy, Bayonne in France and Yokogawa in Japan.

He is, as of September 2024, the rugby head coach at Colby College in Waterville, Maine.
