= Tanner Vili =

Samoa international rugby union player

Tanner Aiavao Vili
- Born: 13 May 1976 (age 50) Wellington, New Zealand
- Height: 1.73 m (5 ft 8 in)
- Weight: 80 kg (176 lb)

Rugby union career
- Position(s): Flyhalf, Fullback
–	Pacific Islanders		
Senior career
Years	Team	Apps	(Points)
2002–04	Border Reivers		
2004–06	Kintetsu		
Provincial / State sides
Years	Team	Apps	(Points)
–2002	Counties Manukau		
2006–08	Wanganui		
2009	King Country		
Super Rugby
Years	Team	Apps	(Points)
2000–01	Hurricanes	5	(7)
International career
Years	Team	Apps	(Points)
1999–2006	Samoa	34	(99)

Tanner Vili (born 13 May 1976) is a New Zealand/Samoan rugby union footballer. He plays as a fly-half and full back

He played for Samoa at the 1999 Rugby World Cup and 2003 Rugby World Cup. He later joined the NZ Barbarians.

In 2004 Vili's illegal clothesline tackle on Mark Cueto began the tension that eventually led to the mass brawl that led to the dismissal of Semo Sititi (yellow card), Alesana Tuilagi and Lewis Moody (both red cards), in some of the worst scenes of violence ever to be witnessed at Twickenham.
