= Grégoire Yachvili =

Georgia international rugby union player

Grégoire Yachvili (born 30 May 1977, in Brive) is a former French rugby union player and a current coach. He played as a flanker. He was born in France to a Georgian father and an Armenian mother. His father, Michel Yachvili and brother Dimitri Yachvili, were also international players for their adopted country.

== Club career ==
Yachvili played for La Teste-de-Buch, Union Bordeaux-Bègles, Racing 92 (2002/03), Stade Bordelais (2003/04-2005/06), after the fusion with this team he played for Union Bordeaux-Bègles (2006/07-2008/09), Libourne (2009/10-2010/11) and Lormont (2011/12-2012/13).

== International career ==
He was invited to adopt Georgian citizenship, due to his father, so that he could play for Georgia. He accepted the invitation. He had 12 caps for Georgia, from 2001 to 2003, scoring 2 tries, 10 points on aggregate. He was called for the 2003 Rugby World Cup, playing in three games but without scoring.

== Coach career ==
He has been the head coach of Lormont, at the Fédérale 2, since 2014.
