= Juan Álvarez (rugby union) =

Uruguayan rugby union player (born 1980)

Juan Miguel Álvarez Zerbino
- Born: Juan Miguel Álvarez Zerbino; 8 July 1980 (age 46) Montevideo, Uruguay
- Occupation: Rugby player

Rugby union career
- Position: Lock
Senior career
Years	Team	Apps	(Points)
- Carrasco Polo Club
International career
Years	Team	Apps	(Points)
2001–2009	Uruguay	23	(10)

Juan Miguel Álvarez Zerbino (born Montevideo, 8 July 1980) is an Uruguayan rugby union player. He plays as a lock.

Álvarez plays for Carrasco Polo Club in Uruguay.

He had 23 caps for Uruguay, since his first game at the 62–8 win over Paraguay, at 6 October 2001, in Montevideo, for the South American Rugby Championship. His last game was at the 29–26 loss to Russia, at 21 June 2009, in Bucharest, for the IRB Nations Cup. He scored 2 tries during his international career, 10 points on aggregate.

He was called for the 2003 Rugby World Cup, playing in two games, one of them as a substitute, but without scoring.
