= Zurab Mtchedlishvili =

Georgian rugby union player

Zurab Mtchedlishvili (born 22 October 1971 in Tbilisi) is a former Georgian rugby union player. He played as a lock.

He played for several teams in France, including Millau, Albi, Stade Domontais and Figeac.

He had 45 caps for Georgia, from 1995 to 2007, scoring 4 tries, 20 points on aggregate. He was called for the 2003 Rugby World Cup, playing in three games, and for the 2007 Rugby World Cup, playing in one game. He never scored in any of his two presences. He was one of the oldest players present at the 2007 Rugby World Cup, aged 35 years old.
