= David Dadunashvili =

Georgian rugby union player

David Dadunashvili (geo: დავით დადუნაშვილი; born Kutaisi, 27 January 1982) is a Georgian rugby union player. He plays as a prop.

Dadunashvili has played in France for RC Nîmes, Valence Sportif, RC Massy (2006/07-2008/09), CA Périgueux (2009/10-2011/12), all in the Fédérale 1, except the last season at Pro D2, Tarbes Pyrénées Rugby (2012/13), in the Pro D2, and he plays for RC Massy since 2013/14, where he won the Fédérale 1 for the same season.

He has 28 caps for Georgia, since his first one at the 31–22 loss to Italy, in Asti, at 6 September 2003, aged 21 years old, in a tour. He has scored 9 tries, 45 points in aggregate. He was called for the 2003 Rugby World Cup, in Australia, playing in three matches and scoring the first ever Georgia try at the competition at the 19–46 loss to South Africa, at 24 October 2003, in Sydney. He was a regular player for Georgia in the following years, except for a one-year absence, after which he returned to the National Team in 2007. He wasn't called for the 2007 Rugby World Cup. He still would be a current member of the Georgia side until his most recent match at the 16–21 loss to Namibia, at 20 June 2010, in Bucharest, for the IRB Nations Cup. He has been absent from his National Team since then.
