= Des Tuiavi'i =

Samoa international rugby union player

- Born: Desmond R. Tuiavi'i; 14 January 1970 (age 56) Apia, Samoa
- Height: 6 ft 1 in (1.85 m)
- Weight: 227 lb (103 kg)

Rugby union career
- Position: Flanker
Amateur team(s)
Years	Team	Apps	(Points)
2001-2002	West Harbour		
Senior career
Years	Team	Apps	(Points)
2003-2004	Rotherham Titans	8	(0)
Provincial / State sides
Years	Team	Apps	(Points)
2001	Southland		
Super Rugby
Years	Team	Apps	(Points)
2001	NSW Waratahs		
2002	ACT Brumbies		
International career
Years	Team	Apps	(Points)
2003	Samoa	5	(0)

Desmond R. Tuiavi'i (born 14 January 1970 in Apia) is a Samoan former rugby union player. He played as a flanker.

== Career ==
He had five international caps for Samoa in 2003, being his first against Ireland, at Apia, on 20 June 2003. He played three matches in the 2003 Rugby World Cup, against Uruguay, England and South Africa. After the match against the Springboks, he was not called anymore for the national team. He also played in the Super 14 for the NSW Waratahs and the ACT Brumbies, and then in 2003 he moved to England to play for the Rotherham Titans.

Desmond now lives in Noordwijk, the Netherlands, and is coach of the Bassets Under 18 in Sassenheim. In 2018 he was co-founder of Invictus Rugby Club Noordwijk.
