= Carlos Baldassari =

Uruguayan rugby union footballer and coach

Carlos Andrés Baldassari (born 15 March 1979 in Salta) is a Uruguayan former rugby union player and a current coach. He played as a wing.

Baldassari started his career at Salto Rugby Club, aged 6, where he played until he was 18. He then moved to Champagnat, in Montevideo, where he became noticed and was called to play for Uruguay.

He had 11 caps for Uruguay, scoring 2 tries, 10 points on aggregate. His first match was a 57-0 loss to Argentina, on 27 August 2003, in Buenos Aires, for the Pan-American Championship. He participated in the 2003 Rugby World Cup, playing in two full matches but without scoring. His last match was the infamous 134-0 loss to South Africa on 11 June 2005, in East London, in a tour, when he was 26 years old.

After finishing his player career, he became a coach. He became coach of Farrapos, in Bento Gonçalves, Rio Grande do Sul, Brazil, in July 2009. He led Farrapos (previously a minor team in his state), to four titles of the Rio Grande do Sul Championship, a Cup of Brazil win, and to the I Division, where they are one of the top five teams in Brazil.

In 2016, Baldassari became the coach of Serra Rugby Club.
