= Bessik Khamashuridze =

Georgian rugby union footballer and coach (1977-)

Bessik Khamashuridze (Georgian: ბესიკ ხამაშურიძე; born 14 August 1977, in Kutaisi) is a former Georgian rugby union player and a current coach. He played as a fullback.

Khamashuridze played for Rugby Club Cannes Mandelieu, in France.

He had 59 caps for Georgia, from 1998 to 2011, scoring 14 tries, 70 points on aggregate. He was called for the 2003 Rugby World Cup, playing in all the four games, and for the 2007 Rugby World Cup, playing in three games. He never scored in his two presences at the major international rugby union competition. He played at the 2011 Rugby World Cup qualifyings but was left outside the final squad.

He is the current coach of RC AIA Kutaisi, in the Georgia Rugby Championship.
