= Juan Menchaca =

Uruguay international rugby union player

- Born: Juan Ramon Menchaca; July 23, 1977 (age 49) Montevideo, Uruguay
- Height: 5 ft 9 in (1.75 m)
- Weight: 176 lb (80 kg)

Rugby union career
- Position(s): Wing, Fullback
- Current team: Carrasco Polo Club
Senior career
| Years | Team | Apps | (Points) |
- Carrasco Polo Club
International career
| Years | Team | Apps | (Points) |
| 1999-2007 | Uruguay | 39 | (254) |

Juan Ramón Menchaca (born 23 July 1977 in Montevideo) is a former Uruguayan rugby union player. He played as a fullback or as a wing.

He was a member of Carrasco Polo Club squad.

He is considered one of the best rugby union footballers of Uruguay, having played at the 1999 Rugby World Cup finals and the 2003 Rugby World Cup finals. He played three games at his first presence, scoring a try, 5 points, and 4 games at his country's most recent presence at the finals, scoring two conversions and three penalties, 13 points in aggregate.

Menchaca's debut for his national team was on 13 March 1999, in a 46–9 win over Portugal, in Montevideo, for the 1999 Rugby World Cup qualifyings repechage. His last match was on 24 March 2007, again with Portugal, in an 18–12 win, in Montevideo, for the 2007 Rugby World Cup repechage.

He had 39 caps, with 6 tries, 28 conversions, 51 penalties and 5 drop goals scored, in an aggregate of 254 points, making him then the top scorer for the "Teros".
