= Alfonso Cardoso =

Uruguayan rugby union player

- Born: December 27, 1971 (age 54) Montevideo, Uruguay
- Height: 5 ft 8 in (1.73 m)
- Weight: 160 lb (73 kg)

Rugby union career
- Position: Fullback
International career
Years	Team	Apps	(Points)
1996-2003	Uruguay	42	(71)

Alfonso Cardoso (born Montevideo, 27 December 1971) is a Uruguayan former rugby union player. He played as a fullback.

== Career ==
For his club rugby, Cardoso played for Old Boys, and regularly represented them at the Punta Del Este Sevens.

He earned 42 caps for Uruguay, from 1996 to 2003, with 14 tries and 1 conversion, 71 points in aggregate. He played twice at the Rugby World Cup finals, in 1999 and 2003. He was capped three times at the first presence, scoring a try, and two times at the second, again scoring a try.
