= Papakura RFC =

Coordinates: 37.063913357°S 174.947033223°E

(New Zealand) Papakura Rugby Football Club
- Union: Counties Manukau Rugby Union
- Nickname: Kura
- Founded: 1912
- Location: Papakura, Auckland
- Ground: Massey Park
- President: Ross Mason

Official website
- www.sporty.co.nz/papakurarugby

Papakura Rugby Football Club is a rugby union club based in Papakura, Auckland. The club was established in 1912 and is affiliated with the Counties Manukau Rugby Union. The club fields teams at both senior and junior level. Junior levels range from small blacks under 6s to competition grades to under 14s. Senior grades range from under 19s to under 21s and representatives.

Papakura has won the Counties Club Rugby competition McNamara Cup on nine occasions: 1956, 1957, 1958 (shared with Waiuku), 1968, 1972, 1973, 1974 (shared with Manurewa), 1982, 1996).
