= Jonathan Meredith (rugby union) =

Samoa international rugby union player

- Born: July 8, 1978 (age 48) Apia, Samoa
- Height: 5 ft 9 in (1.75 m)
- Weight: 238 lb (108 kg)

Rugby union career
Amateur team(s)
Years	Team	Apps	(Points)
2001-2005	Ponsonby RFC		
Provincial / State sides
Years	Team	Apps	(Points)
2001, 2005	Auckland	3	(0)
International career
Years	Team	Apps	(Points)
2001-2005	Samoa	21	(5)

Jonathan E. Meredith (born Apia, July 8, 1978) is a Samoan rugby union player. He plays as a hooker.

== Career ==
He debuted for Samoa in a match against Ireland, at Lansdowne Road, on November 11, 2001. He was also part of the 2003 Rugby World Cup roster, where he played 4 matches. His last international cap was during a match against Fiji, at Suva, on July 30, 2005. He also played for Auckland in the NPC.
