= Semo Sititi =

Samoa international rugby union player

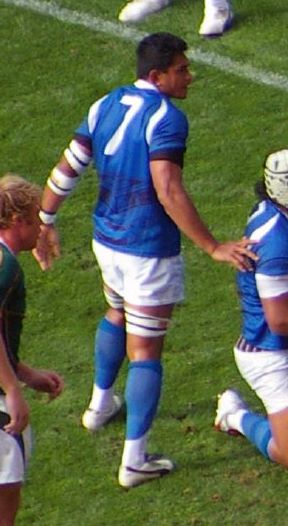
- Born: Lemalu Semo Sititi; 6 March 1974 (age 52) Moto'otua, Samoa
- Height: 1.88 m (6 ft 2 in)
- Weight: 105 kg (231 lb)
- School: St Joseph's College, Samoa
- Notable relative: Wallace Sititi (son)

Rugby union career
- Position(s): Flanker, Number 8
Amateur team(s)
Years	Team	Apps	(Points)
1990–1999	Marist St Joseph		
2000–2001	Marist St Pats		
Senior career
Years	Team	Apps	(Points)
2000–2001	Wellington	13	(5)
2001–2002	Cardiff	15	(10)
2002–2004	Borders	28	(25)
2004–2005	Newcastle	22	(5)
2005–2006	Borders	20	(5)
2006–2009	NTT DoCoMo Red Hurricanes		
Super Rugby
Years	Team	Apps	(Points)
2000	Hurricanes	5	(0)
International career
Years	Team	Apps	(Points)
1999–2009	Samoa	59	(85)
2004–2006	Pacific Islanders	4	(0)
National sevens team
Years	Team		Comps
1994–2005	Samoa 7s		
Coaching career
- Years: Team
- 2014–: Samoa U20

Semo Sititi (born 6 March 1974) is a rugby union player in Samoa. He was born in Motootua.

== Career ==
He is a flanker and last played for Ricoh in Japan, having previously played for Celtic League side Border Reivers and Manu Samoa internationally. He made his test debut in 1999 against Japan in Apia, Samoa. Of Manu Samoa's squad of 30 at the 1999 Rugby World Cup Sititi was the only one based in Samoa.

Sititi took over the role of captain of Samoa when Pat Lam retired after the 1999 Rugby Union World Cup. He has also skippered the Samoa 7s team, including a trip to the 2001 Rugby World Cup 7s in Argentina. In 2000, he won a Super 12 contract with the Wellington Hurricanes, making five appearances, he also played 13 times for Wellington in the National Provincial Championship scoring one try.

In 2002 he joined Cardiff and then Borders in Scotland, where he played for two seasons and then signed for the Newcastle Falcons and later returned to Borders in 2005. He played in the 2003 Rugby World Cup and scored a try against the eventual champions England. Semo is Samoa's third most capped player.

He is the father of two New Zealand national rugby team professionals All Black Wallace Sititi and daughter Amarante Sititi who plays for the Black Ferns.
