= Rudolf Straeuli =

South African rugby union player

- Born: Rudolf August Wilkens Straeuli; 20 August 1963 (age 63) Pretoria, South Africa
- Height: 1.95 m (6 ft 5 in)
- Weight: 110 kg (243 lb; 17 st 5 lb)
- School: Die Hoërskool Menlopark
- University: University of Pretoria; Stellenbosch University

Rugby union career
- Position: Loose forward
Senior career
Years	Team	Apps	(Points)
1998–1999	Bedford Blues	6	(0)
Provincial / State sides
Years	Team	Apps	(Points)
1990	Northern Transvaal		
1993–1996	Transvaal	61	
International career
Years	Team	Apps	(Points)
1994–1995	South Africa	10	(20)
Coaching career
- Years: Team
- 1998–1999: Bedford Blues
- 1999–2000: Boland
- 2000–2001: Coastal Sharks
- 2002–2003: South Africa

Rudolf August Wilkens Straeuli (born 20 August 1963) is a South African rugby union administrator, and a former player and coach. He is currently the CEO of the Lions Rugby Company. He played in the positions of flanker and Number 8, making 10 test appearances for South Africa in 1994 and 1995. He was the coach of the Springboks rugby team in 2002 and 2003. He also played for the Golden Lions provincial team in the Currie Cup and Super 12 competitions.

== Playing career ==
Straeuli played his first in provincial rugby in 1990 for Northern Transvaal and from 1993 he played for Transvaal. During 1993 he also toured with the South African Barbarians to the United Kingdom.

Straeuli made his debut for South Africa on 9 July 1994 against the All Blacks, in which he also scored a try. In all he played 10 tests, including representing South Africa in the 1995 Rugby World Cup, before his career ended on 18 November 1995 against England at Twickenham Stadium.

In 1997 he joined the Bedford Blues rugby club in England.

== Coaching career ==
In 1998 he transitioned from player to coach at Bedford.

=== Coastal Sharks ===
Staeuli coached the Coastal Sharks for the 2001 and 2002 seasons in the Super 12 tournament. In his first season in charge, he led the team to a runner up finish, having finished in last place the season before.

=== Springboks ===
In 2002, Straeuli took over as the head coach of the Springboks. He won his first four games, with two victories over Wales, a 20-point victory over Argentina and a convincing 60–18 defeat of Samoa. However, the team subsequently suffered several defeats against the bigger nations, losing 30–10 to France, 21–6 to Scotland, 53–3 to England and 52–16 to New Zealand during his reign.

He coached the Springboks during the 2003 Rugby World Cup, a campaign that saw South Africa failing to reach the semi-finals of a World Cup for the first time. Straeuli was forced to resign shortly after the tournament when details of his infamous Kamp Staaldraad training camp came to light.

Overall, Straeuli coached 23 tests and won 52% of them, one of the worst records for a South African coach.

== Accolades ==
In 2006 he was inducted into the University of Pretoria Sport Hall of fame.

== See also ==
- List of South Africa national rugby union players – Springbok no. 616

Sporting positions
Preceded by (South Africa) Harry Viljoen	South Africa National Rugby Union Coach; 2002–2003	Succeeded by (South Africa) Jake White
