= Ignacio Conti =

Uruguayan former rugby union player

- Born: Ignacio Conti; November 5, 1977 (age 49) Montevideo, Uruguay
- Height: 5 ft 11 in (180 cm)
- Weight: 210 lb (95 kg)

Rugby union career
- Position: Lock
Senior career
Years	Team	Apps	(Points)
20??-2009	Carrasco Polo Club		
International career
Years	Team	Apps	(Points)
2002–2009	Uruguay	35	(45)

Ignacio Conti (born 5 November 1977) is a Uruguayan former rugby union player who played as lock or as number eight.

== Career ==
At club level, Conti played for Carrasco Polo Club. His first cap for Uruguay was on 22 September 2002, against Namibia, in Montevideo. He was also part of the 2003 Rugby World Cup Uruguay squad, where he only played the match against Samoa. His last cap for Uruguay was against Scotland A, in Bucharest, on 16 June 2009.
