= Juan Campomar =

Uruguayan rugby union footballer

- Born: March 10, 1982 (age 44)
- Height: 5 ft 8 in (1.73 m)
- Weight: 162 lb (73 kg; 11.6 st)

Rugby union career
- Position: Scrum-half
International career
Years	Team	Apps	(Points)
2003-2009	Uruguay	36	(30)

Juan Campomar (born 10 March 1982) is a Uruguayan rugby union footballer. He plays as a scrum-half.

Campomar played at his country team of Old Boys, moving to US Montauban, for the season of 2005/06. He later returned to play for Old Boys.

Campomar had 36 caps for Uruguay, with 6 tries scored, 30 points in aggregate, from 2003 to 2009. He was present at the 2003 Rugby World Cup finals, playing in three matches. He was also the captain of the "Teros". He also played in the 2007 Rugby World Cup and 2011 Rugby World Cup failed qualifications.
