= Diego Lamelas =

Uruguay international rugby union player

- Born: Diego Lamelas; 14 November 1972 (age 53) Montevideo, Uruguay
- Height: 1.68 m (5 ft 6 in)
- Weight: 90 kg (14 st 2 lb)

Rugby union career
- Position: Hooker
International career
Years	Team	Apps	(Points)
1998-2006	Uruguay	51	(28)

Diego Lamelas (born Montevideo, 14 December 1972) is a Uruguayan rugby union player. He plays as a hooker.

Lamelas was a member of Argentinian team of Asociación Alumni. He was a senior Uruguayan rugby union player and a regular member of Uruguay national rugby union team. He played twice at the Rugby World Cup finals, in 1999 and 2003. At the first time, he played three games, and at the second, four, scoring a try. Lamelas ended his international career, who lasted from 1998 to 2006, with 51 caps for his side, with 6 tries scored and 28 points in aggregate. Lamelas also played at the unsuccessful campaign for the 2007 Rugby World Cup finals.
