= Lome Fa'atau =

Samoa international rugby union player

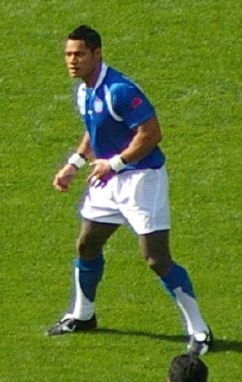
- Born: Lome Fa'atau; 23 October 1975 (age 51) Wellington, New Zealand
- Height: 6 ft 0 in (1.83 m)
- Weight: 14 st 7 lb (92 kg)
- School: St. Patrick's College, Wellington

Rugby union career
- Position(s): Wing, Fullback
Senior career
Years	Team	Apps	(Points)
- Marist St Pats
2007-2009	Glasgow Warriors	29	(50)
2009-2010	Nice	9	(20)
2010-2011	Crociati	13	(25)
2012-	Westoe	16	(40)
Provincial / State sides
Years	Team	Apps	(Points)
1999	Wellington		
2000	Taranaki		
2001-2006	Wellington		
Super Rugby
Years	Team	Apps	(Points)
2002–03	Hurricanes	15	(25)
2004	Chiefs	12	(25)
2005–07	Hurricanes	29	(80)
International career
Years	Team	Apps	(Points)
2000–07	Samoa	35	(70)
2004–06	Pacific Islanders	5	(5)

Lome Fa'atau (born 23 October 1975 in Wellington, New Zealand) is a rugby union player. The winger is recognisable by his traditional Samoan tattoo (pe'a). Before his rugby career took off, he attended St. Patrick's College in Wellington, where he was a star basketball player for his college team. It was not until he left college did he begin playing rugby union for the local club Marist St. Pat's, where he made his debut in the third grade division at fullback.

== Career ==
He made his provincial debut in the 1999 season of the National Provincial Championship in New Zealand, playing for Wellington. The next year he joined Taranaki and became the leading try scorer for the province that season. The following year he returned to his old province in Wellington. In 2002 he played for the Hurricanes in the international Super 12 competition. Two years later he joined the Chiefs before returning to the Hurricanes.

He made his debut for Manu Samoa in 2002. Fa'atau played on the wing in all matches for Samoa in the 2003 World Cup in Australia, except for the match against Georgia, Fa'atau scored one try during the World Cup. Fa'atau describes his best rugby memory as making the Manu Samoa team.

The Hurricanes made it to the 2006 Super 14 final. Although not finishing as champions, Fa'atau was the lead try scorer of the season, amassing a total of 10 tries.

Fa'atau joined Scottish side Glasgow after the 2007 Rugby World Cup.

After an indifferent two seasons with Glasgow he joined Nice who play in Federale 1 in France, and plays with former internationals Dan Luger, Ross Beattie, Kevin Yates and Mark McHugh, and England coach Martin Johnson's brother Will Johnson who used to play for Leicester Tigers.

== Personal life ==
Lome is also a committed Christian and wears the initial "J" and "C" (for Jesus Christ) on his wristbands every match.

His brother Eneliko (Ene) Fa'atau also plays rugby and is the player/coach for the Irish Leinster league division club Dundalk.

He is now working at Storm Fitness in Newcastle as a personal trainer and strength and conditioning coach.
