= Peter Poulos (rugby union) =

- Born: 7 June 1977 (age 49) Samoa
- Height: 6 ft 3 in (1.91 m)
- Weight: 238 lb (108 kg)

Rugby union career
Senior career
Years	Team	Apps	(Points)
- Orrell
2003-2004	NTT DoCoMo Red Hurricanes		
2004-2013	London Irish		
International career
Years	Team	Apps	(Points)
2003	Samoa	4	(0)

Peter Poulos (born 7 June 1977) is a Samoan rugby union player. He plays as a flanker.

== Career ==
He played for Orrell R.U.F.C, NTT Docomo Red Hurricanes and London Irish during his club career. His only international caps for Samoa were during the 2003 Rugby World Cup, where he played four matches. He retired as a player due to an injury.
