= Kas Lealamanua =

Samoan rugby union player

- Born: Kasiano Lealamanu'a; 15 December 1976 (age 49) Wellington, New Zealand
- Height: 1.75 m (5 ft 9 in)
- Weight: 115 kg (18 st 2 lb; 254 lb)
- School: St Patrick's College

Rugby union career
- Position: Prop
Senior career
Years	Team	Apps	(Points)
1998–2003	Wellington	27	
2004	Coventry	9	(5)
2004–2007	Biarritz	62	(10)
2007–2009	Dax	44	(0)
2009–2010	Saracens	9	(0)
2010–2011	Hawke's Bay	11	(0)
International career
Years	Team	Apps	(Points)
2000-2007	Samoa	30	(5)
2008	Pacific Islanders	1	(0)

Kasiano "Kas" Lealamanua (born 15 December 1976) is a Samoan rugby union player. Lealamanua plays Prop for Saracens in the Guinness Premiership. Having previously played for Biarritz and US Dax for a number of seasons in the Top 14. Lealamanua has represented Samoa a number of times, at both the 2003 and 2007 world cups. Lealamanua has also represented the Pacific Islanders 2008.
