= Motoʻotua =

Settlement in Samoa

Coordinates: 13°50′45.8″S 171°45′46.72″W

Motoʻotua is a settlement in Samoa. It is home to the Tupua Tamasese Meaʻole Hospital.
