= Irakli Giorgadze =

Georgian rugby union player

Irakli Giorgadze (born Kutaisi, 17 December 1982) is a Georgian rugby union player. He plays as a centre.

== Biography ==
Giorgadze moved to France, where he played for CS Bourgoin-Jallieu (2004/05-2006/07), US Dax (2007/08-2008/09) and SO Chambérien, where he plays since 2009/10.

He has 40 caps for Georgia, since 2001, with 2 tries and 2 drop goals scored, 16 points in aggregate. He was called for the 2003 Rugby World Cup, playing in three games, and for the 2007 Rugby World Cup, playing once again in three games, but remaining scoreless.
