= Rodrigo Sánchez (rugby union) =

Uruguay international rugby union player

- Born: October 25, 1976 (age 50) Montevideo
- Height: 5 ft 9 in (1.75 m)
- Weight: 212 lb (96 kg; 15.1 st)

Rugby union career
- Position: Prop
Senior career
Years	Team	Apps	(Points)
- Carrasco Polo Club
International career
Years	Team	Apps	(Points)
1996-2009	Uruguay	67	(25)

Rodrigo Toledo Sánchez (born Montevideo, 25 October 1976) was a Uruguayan rugby union player. He played as a prop.

He played for Carrasco Polo Club.

Sanchez is one of the most international players for Uruguay, counting 67 caps, from 1996 to 2009, with 5 tries scored, 25 points in aggregate. He had his first game at the 54-20 loss to Argentina, in Hamilton, Canada, for the PARA Pan American Championship, aged only 19 years old, in a competition where the "Teros" finished in 4th and last place.

He was called for the 1999 Rugby World Cup, where he played in three games, for the 2003 Rugby World Cup, where he played in four games, and remaining scoreless in both competitions. He had his last cap at the 27-6 loss to the United States, in Lauderhill, at 21 November 2009, aged 33 years old, for the 2011 Rugby World Cup qualifyings, which his country missed.
