= Joaquín Pastore =

Uruguay international rugby union player

- Born: 5 December 1981 (age 44) Montevideo
- Height: 5 ft 11 in (1.80 m)
- Weight: 189 lb (86 kg; 13.5 st)

Rugby union career
- Position(s): Wing, Centre
International career
| Years | Team | Apps | (Points) |
| 2003-2009 | Uruguay | 38 | (20) |

Joaquin Pastore (born 5 December 1981 in Montevideo) is a Uruguayan rugby union player. He plays as a wing or as a centre.

His current team is Old Boys.

Pastore holds 37 caps for Uruguay, with 4 tries scored, 20 points in aggregate, since his debut on 27 April 2003, in a 20-13 win over Chile, for the South American Rugby Championship, Division 1. Uruguay qualified the same year for the second time to be present at the 2003 Rugby World Cup finals. They managed a win over Georgia by 24-12. Pastore played in all four games, one of them as a substitute, remaining scoreless.

He has been a regular presence at The Teros side, being present at the unsuccessful attempt at qualification for the 2007 Rugby World Cup finals, lost in the repechage to Portugal.

Pastore played in the double wins over Brazil (71-3) and Chile (43-9) for the 2011 Rugby World Cup qualifying. Uruguay lost both home and away matches to USA but defeated Kazakhstan and qualified for the final play-offs with Romania, being eliminated.
