= Diego Aguirre (rugby union) =

Uruguay international rugby union player

- Born: September 23, 1974 (age 52) Montevideo, Uruguay
- Height: 6 ft 2 in (1.88 m)
- Weight: 210 lb (95 kg)

Rugby union career
- Position: Fly-half
Senior career
Years	Team	Apps	(Points)
- Carrasco
–	US Tours		
International career
Years	Team	Apps	(Points)
1995-2007	Uruguay	74	(152)

Diego Aguirre (born 23 September 1974 in Montevideo) is a former Uruguayan rugby player. He played as a fly half.

He played for Carrasco Polo Club, in Uruguay, and for US Tours, in France, in 2004/2005. He left competition in 2011/12.

Aguirre is one of the best players from his country, having his debut for Uruguay, on 7 March 1995, in a 9–28 loss to Canada. He had 74 caps for the "Teros", until 24 March 2007, at the 18–12 win over Portugal, being the most capped player of the national team. Aguirre has scored 11 tries, 17 conversions and 26 penalties, in an aggregate of 154 points.

He played at the Rugby World Cup finals, in 1999 and 2003. He was the top scorer for his country, in 1999, with one conversion and four penalties, 17 points in aggregate. He was also the captain in 2003, scoring two penalties and two conversions, this time, 10 points.
