= Uruguay national rugby union team =

Rugby union team

Uruguay
- Nickname: Los Teros
- Emblem: Southern lapwing
- Union: Uruguayan Rugby Union
- Head coach: Vacant
- Captain: Andrés Vilaseca
- Most caps: Diego Magno (107)
- Top scorer: Felipe Berchesi (369)
- Top try scorer: Diego Ormaechea (33)
- Home stadium: Estadio Charrúa
First colours	Second colours

World Rugby ranking
- Current: 15 (as of 19 June 2026)
- Highest: 14 (2005, 2025)
- Lowest: 23 (2012, 2013, 2017)

First international
- Chile 21–3 Uruguay (Buenos Aires, Argentina; 5 August 1948)

Biggest win
- Paraguay 6–102 Uruguay (Puerto Iguazú, Argentina; 14 May 2011)

Biggest defeat
- South Africa 134–3 Uruguay (East London, South Africa; 11 June 2005)

World Cup
- Appearances: 5 (first in 1999)
- Best result: Pool stage (1999, 2003, 2015, 2019, 2023)
- Website: uru.org.uy/teros-xv-3

The Uruguay national rugby union team, nicknamed Los Teros, represents the Uruguayan Rugby Union in men's international rugby union. One of the older test sides in the world, Uruguay has qualified six times for the Rugby World Cup, in 1999, 2003, 2015, 2019, 2023 and most recently 2027. As of 22 November 2025 they are ranked 14th in the world, and are ranked 2nd in the Americas region, behind rivals Argentina.

Uruguay has consistently been one of the better fringe international sides in rugby union, having consistently beaten Tier 2/3 competition from across the globe. Uruguay won the South American Rugby Championship in 1981, the only time (pre-2014) that a team other than Argentina won the tournament. They came second on 19 occasions and third on the remaining 9. As of 2012, Uruguay has been classified as a Tier 2 nation, which allows them to receive more funding from World Rugby.

Their home stadium is Estadio Charrúa in Montevideo and holds up to 14,000 people. Estadio Domingo Burgueño has also been used for some fixtures in the Americas Rugby Championship.

The nickname Los Teros refers to the national bird of Uruguay, the southern lapwing (Vanellus chilensis).

== History ==
=== 1900s–60s ===
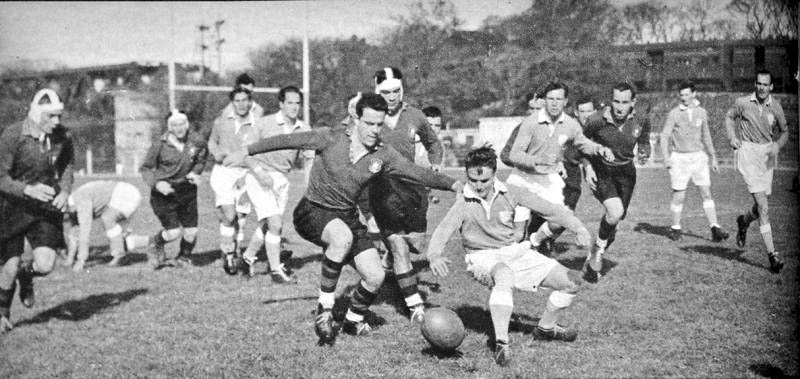
Uruguay v. Chile in the 1951 South American championship held in Buenos Aires

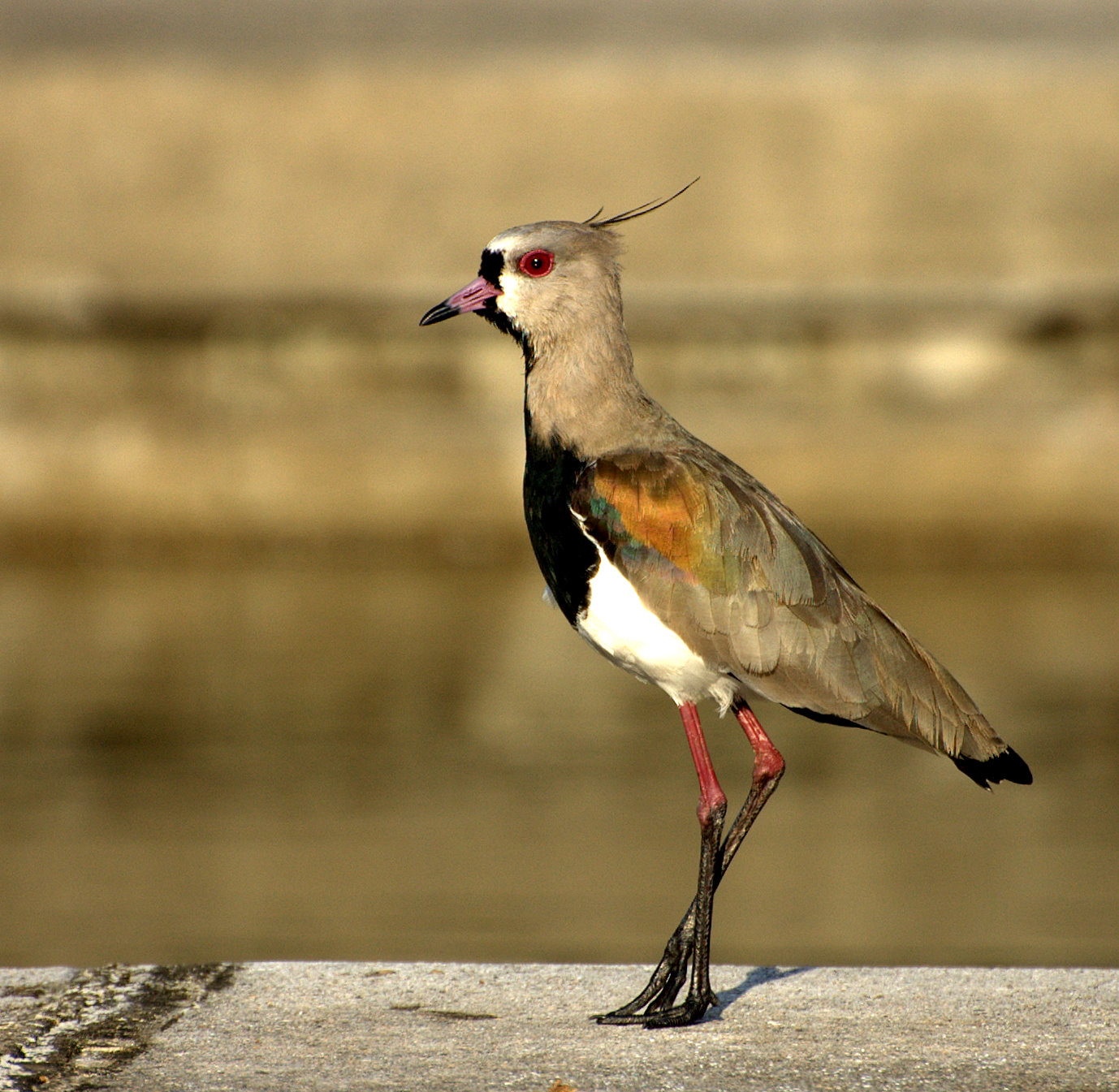
The southern lapwing, commonly seen in Uruguayan sport fields, became the emblem of the Uruguayan National Rugby Team.

There are reports of rugby football being played in Uruguay as early as 1865. The game was introduced by British immigrants, with the game being more popularized by the Congregation of Christian Brothers, who were of Irish origin. Because of this, Uruguay has one of the oldest rugby cultures outside the British Isles, and one of the most established in the South America.

Uruguay made their official international debut in 1948, in a game against Chile, which Uruguay lost 21–3. Following their debut match, they returned to competition in the Pan American Games, first against the more experienced Argentina, resulting in a 0–62 loss. Uruguay then faced Chile for the second time, defeating them by 8–3. The final match of the competition was a 17–10 win over Brazil. Uruguay thus became runners up in the first unofficial South American Rugby Championship.

Uruguay, after a four years hiatus, played Chile in 1956, who defeated them by 6–3. In 1958, they played for the first official South American Rugby Championship, in a pool of three countries. They first played Chile, this time losing by 9–34. The Teros met again Argentina, having another loss, this time by 3–50. Uruguay managed to defeat Peru (10–6) in the last game.

In 1960, Uruguay faced for the first time one of the powers of the Northern Hemisphere rugby, France XV, losing by 0–61 in Montevideo during a South American tour. Uruguay after this match entered their second South American Rugby Championship. They first won against Brazil in a close game (11–8), then losing to Chile (5–28) and Argentina (3–36) in the closest result to then between both countries.

=== 1970s – 1980s ===
The 1970s started off with a win over Paraguay in 1971, which was followed by a win and loss against Chile and a win against Brazil. They also played Argentina twice in the 1970s. However, they won all their matches except for those against Argentina, as well as losing one game against Chile and drawing another. However, the next game against Argentina, two years later in 1979, Uruguay came close to defeating the Pumas, going down by just three points, the final score being 19 to 16.

The 1980s started off with a 54 to 14 win over Paraguay, which resulted in a winning streak that was stopped by Argentina in 1983. In 1985, France visited Montevideo for a second time to play the Teros, beating the locals 34–6. Another short undefeated streak occurred over 1987/1989, which was broken by a 19 to 17 loss against Chile. This was followed by a sound loss to Argentina and loss to a new opponent, the United States Eagles.

=== 1990s ===
The 1990s started off with wins against of Chile, Brazil and Paraguay. This was followed by more wins over their traditional opponents, though Uruguay still lost to Argentina, they also played Canada in a competitive 28–9 loss in 1995. Uruguay played some of the bigger nations such as Argentina, Canada and the United States, although the Canada and U.S. games were a lot closer than some of their previous encounters.

A huge success for them was qualifying for the 1999 Rugby World Cup in Wales. They won their pool fixture against Spain, Uruguay finished third in their pool.

=== 2000–present ===
Uruguay came within 10 points of Argentina in 2001, and also played nations such as Italy in the same year. Uruguay won most of their matches against their traditional Americas opponents in the early 2000s. Later in 2002, Uruguay defeated Canada, winning 25–23. They followed this up with a 10–9 win over the United States. They again qualified for the 2003 World Cup. They won their pool fixture against Georgia 24–12.

Uruguay's qualification for the 2007 World Cup started in Americas Round 3a, where they were grouped with Argentina and Chile. After losing their first match 26–0 to Argentina, they defeated Chile 43–15 in Montevideo, which saw them enter Round 4. In round 4 they faced the United States, and Uruguay lost on aggregate, and moved onto the repechage round as Americas 4. Uruguay played Portugal in the repechage over two legs — losing the first in Lisbon and winning the second in Montevideo — but lost on aggregate points and failed to qualify.

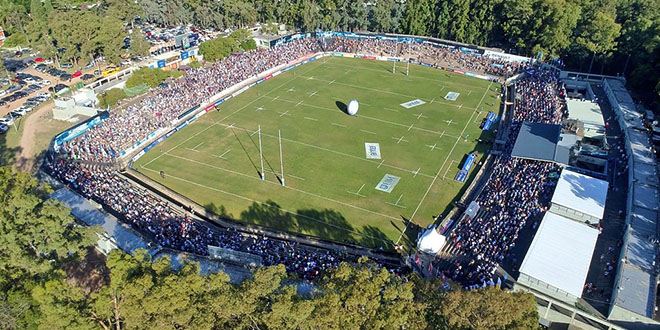
Estadio Charrúa in Montevideo, home of Los Teros.

Uruguay lost the 2011 Rugby World Cup qualification. Uruguay had won the 2009 South American Rugby Championship "A" by defeating Brazil and Chile at the Estadio Charrúa. Uruguay then lost to the United States 22–27 and 6–27. In the repechage, Uruguay defeated Kazakhstan 44–7, but in the battle for the 20th and final spot at the 2011 Rugby World Cup, Uruguay tied Romania at home 21–21 and lost 12–32 in Bucharest.

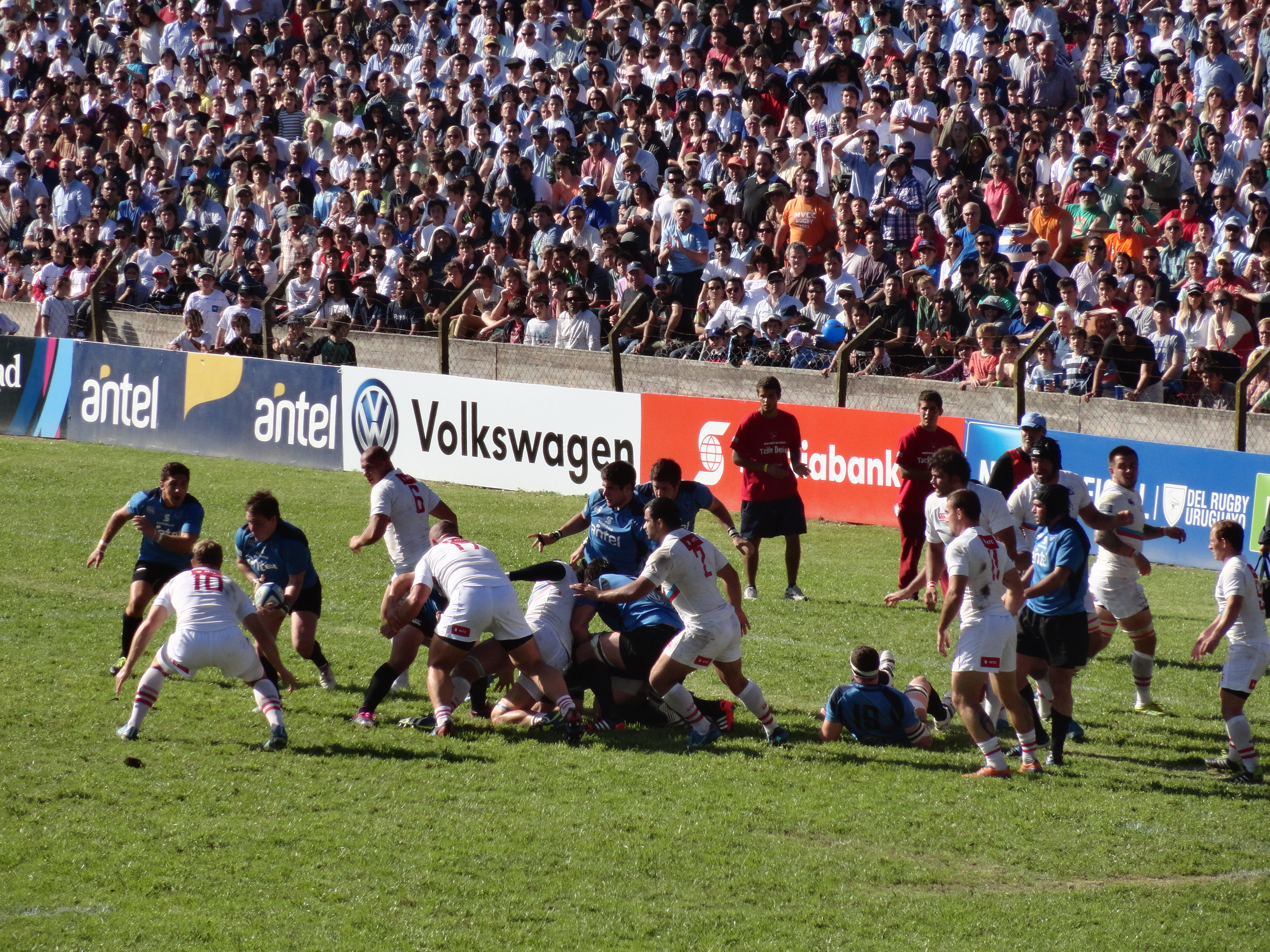
2015 Rugby World Cup repechage qualifier match between Uruguay and Russia

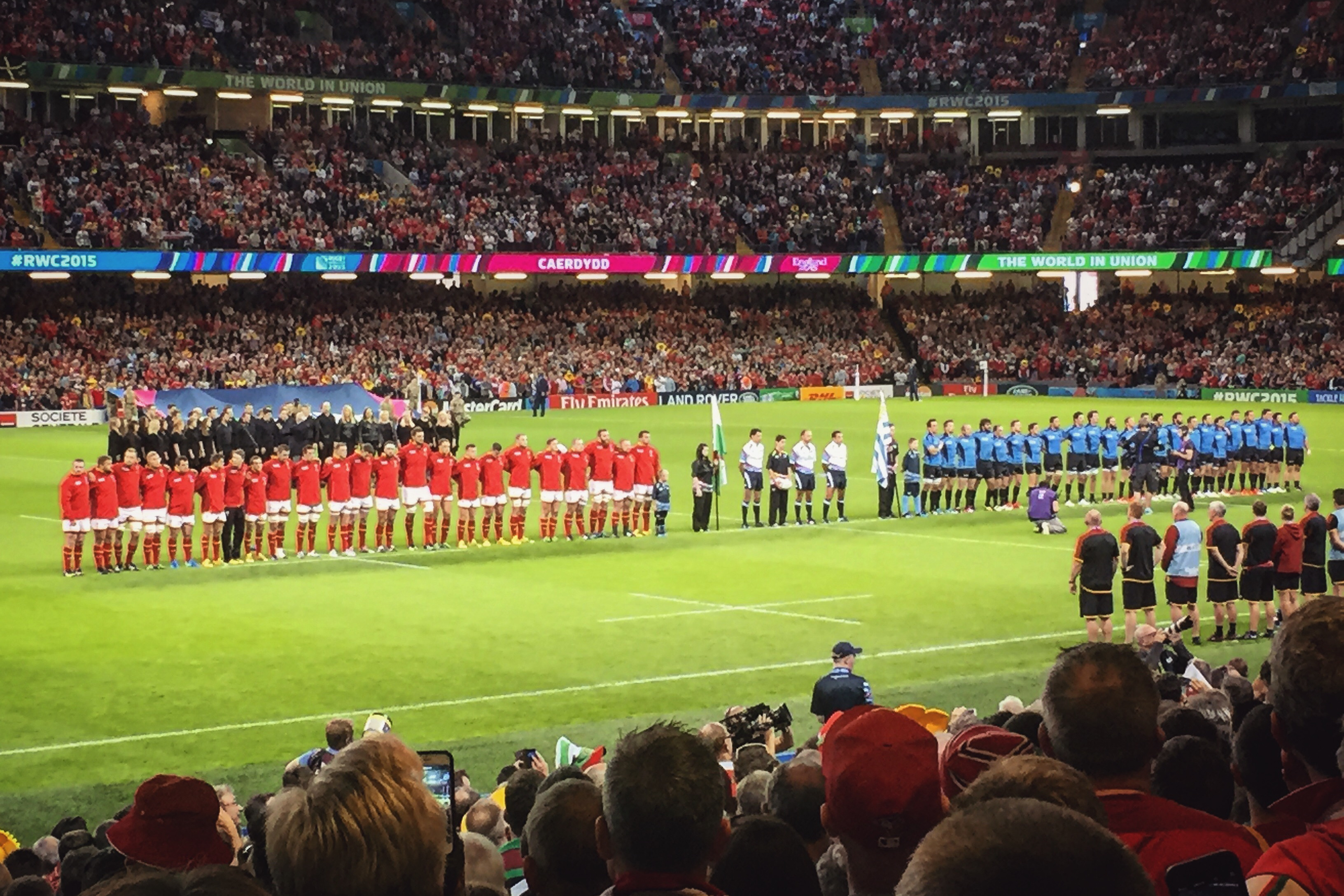
Uruguay lining up for the anthems at the Millennium Stadium before the Pool A match against Wales in the 2015 Rugby World Cup

During the 2015 Rugby World Cup qualifying, Uruguay won the 2013 South American Rugby Championship "A", getting wins at the Estadio Charrúa against Brazil (58–7) and Chile (23–9). In March 2014, Uruguay faced the United States in a NACRA-CONSUR playoff for the last Americas qualification spot. Uruguay tied the home leg 27–27, but lost the away leg 32–13. Uruguay then moved to the repechage, where it defeated Hong Kong 28–3 at the Estadio Charrúa, to face Russia for the 20th and final spot at the 2015 Rugby World Cup. Uruguay qualified for the 2015 Rugby World Cup by defeating Russia by an aggregate score of 57–49 in the two-game series, winning the second game at home 36–27 in front of 14,000 fans at the Charrua Stadium.

Uruguay claimed three wins and two losses at the 2016 Americas Rugby Championship, but ranked fourth out of six because they only scored two bonus points. In 2017 the team also claimed three wins and two losses, finishing third. On 3 February 2018, Los Teros qualified for 2019 Rugby World Cup as Americas 2 after beating Canada in the home-away leg, and started it with a surprising 30–27 win over Fiji on 25 September: it was Uruguay's first World Cup win in 16 years.

On 30 October 2019, nightclub in southwestern Japan filed criminal complaint against players from the Uruguay team for 2019 Rugby World Cup for allegedly damaging property.

In 2021, Uruguay qualified for the 2023 Rugby World Cup as Americas 1, after a 1–1 series draw with the United States They lost the first game 19-16, but won the second game 34-15. They won on aggregate points (50-34) and are in Pool A with New Zealand, France, Italy and Namibia.

== Record ==
=== Overall record ===
Men's World Rugby Rankings Top 20 as of 16 November 2026
Rank	Change (Note: Change from the previous week)	Team	Points
1	Steady	South Africa	91.53
2	Steady	New Zealand	90.65
3	▲1	France	89.05
4	▼1	Ireland	88.70
5	Steady	England	86.99
6	Steady	Scotland	85.28
7	Steady	Australia	82.24
8	Steady	Argentina	82.09
9	▲1	Wales	79.37
10	▼1	Fiji	77.79
11	Steady	Italy	75.84
12	Steady	Japan	75.25
13	Steady	Georgia	74.23
14	▲1	United States	68.39
15	▼1	Portugal	68.24
16	▲3	Samoa	67.60
17	▲1	Chile	67.00
18	▼2	Spain	66.53
19	▼2	Tonga	65.58
20	Steady	Uruguay	65.17

Uruguay's historical rankings

Source: World Rugby
Graph updated to 16 November 2026

Uruguay has lost all official matches versus Argentina, but has a winning record against their other South American rivals such as Chile, Paraguay, and Brazil. They played Chile for the fiftieth time during the 2023 Rugby World Cup warm-up matches, winning 26–25.

Regarding tier 2 teams, Uruguay has winning records against Namibia, Spain, Portugal and Russia, and losing records against the United States, Canada, Japan, Georgia, Romania, and Fiji.

Below is a table of the representative rugby matches played by an Uruguay national XV at test level up until 14 November 2026, updated after match with Zimbabwe.

Opponent	Played	Won	Lost	Drawn	Win %	For	Aga	Diff
Argentina	41	0	41	0	0.00%	418	1,784	−1,366
Argentina XV	15	5	9	1	33.33%	329	530	−201
Argentina Jaguars	2	0	2	0	0.00%	40	101	−61
Australia	2	0	2	0	0.00%	13	110	−97
Basque Country	1	1	0	0	100.00%	41	19	+22
Belgium	1	1	0	0	100%	39	13	+26
Brazil	31	28	3	0	90.32%	1,060	328	+732
Canada	13	5	8	0	38.46%	232	370	−138
Chile	57	43	13	1	78.43%	1,257	769	+488
Emerging Ireland	3	0	3	0	0.00%	43	126	−83
England	2	0	2	0	0.00%	16	171	−155
Fiji	4	1	3	0	25%	76	181	−105
Fiji XV	1	0	1	0	0.00%	3	24	−21
Fiji Warriors	3	1	2	0	33.33%	73	82	−9
France	2	0	2	0	0.00%	40	70	−30
France XV	3	0	3	0	0.00%	16	136	−120
Georgia	8	2	6	0	25%	138	216	−78
Germany	1	0	1	0	0.00%	21	24	−3
Hong Kong	2	1	1	0	50%	68	45	+23
Italy	5	0	5	0	0.00%	52	147	−95
Emerging Italy	4	2	2	0	50%	90	89	+1
Italy A	1	0	1	0	0%	13	31	–18
Japan	6	1	5	0	16.67%	74	201	−127
Kazakhstan	1	1	0	0	100%	44	7	+37
Morocco	2	1	1	0	100%	36	24	+12
Namibia	6	5	1	0	83.33%	204	156	+48
New Zealand	1	0	1	0	0.00%	0	73	−73
New Zealand XV	2	0	2	0	0.00%	24	109	−75
Paraguay	28	27	0	1	96.43%	1,438	248	+1,190
Peru	1	1	0	0	100%	10	6	+4
Portugal	10	7	3	0	70%	240	136	+104
Romania	17	5	10	2	29.41%	348	440	−92
Russia	9	5	4	0	55.56%	231	215	+16
Samoa	1	0	1	0	0.00%	13	60	−47
Scotland	2	0	2	0	0.00%	31	74	−43
Scotland A	1	0	1	0	0.00%	3	27	−24
South Africa	3	0	3	0	0.00%	12	245	−233
South Africa President's XV	1	0	1	0	0.00%	9	37	−28
Spain	16	7	9	0	43.75%	307	290	+17
United States	20	4	15	1	20%	364	612	−248
Venezuela	1	1	0	0	100%	92	8	+84
Wales	2	0	2	0	0.00%	22	89	−67
Zimbabwe	1	1	0	0	100%	20	15	+5
Total	326	152	168	6	46.63%	7,559	8,419	−860

=== World Cup record ===
Rugby World Cup record									Qualification						
Year	Round	Pld	W	D	L	PF	PA	Squad	Pos	Pld	W	D	L	PF	PA
(New Zealand) (Australia) 1987	Not invited								Not invited						
(England) (France) (Ireland) (Scotland) (Wales) 1991	Did not enter								Did not enter						
(South Africa) 1995	Did not qualify								2nd	3	2	0	1	91	28
(Wales) 1999	Pool stage	3	1	0	2	42	97	Squad	P/O	9	5	0	4	209	188
(Australia) 2003	Pool stage	4	1	0	3	56	255	Squad	2nd	6	3	0	3	115	144
(France) 2007	Did not qualify								P/O	6	2	0	4	86	140
(New Zealand) 2011	Did not qualify								P/O	7	3	1	3	249	106
(England) 2015	Pool stage	4	0	0	4	30	226	Squad	P/O	9	6	1	2	260	168
(Japan) 2019	Pool stage	4	1	0	3	60	140	Squad	P/O	8	8	0	0	318	160
(France) 2023	Pool stage	4	1	0	3	65	164	Squad	P/O	4	3	0	1	101	57
(Australia) 2027	Qualified								P/O	4	3	0	1	162	47
(United States) 2031	To be determined								To be determined						
Total	—	19	4	0	15	253	882	—	—	56	35	2	19	1591	1038
Champions; Runners–up; Third place; Fourth place; Home venue

== Current squad ==
On 23 October, Uruguay named a 32-player squad ahead of the 2026 World Rugby Nations Cup European-African-Asian Series.

Head Coach: (Uruguay) Guzmán Barreiro

- Caps updated: 14 November 2026 (after Zimbabwe v Uruguay)

Player	Position	Date of birth (age)	Caps	Club/province
Germán Kessler	Hooker	1 July 1994 (age 32)	76	(France) Rouen
Germán Kigel	Hooker	3 December 1996 (age 29)	3	(Uruguay) Los Cuervos
Sebastián Pérez	Hooker	31 March 2006 (age 20)	1	(Uruguay) Peñarol
Ignacio Péculo	Prop	22 February 1999 (age 27)	28	(United States) Seattle Seawolves
Mateo Perillo	Prop	11 November 2000 (age 26)	13	(Uruguay) Peñarol
Reinaldo Piussi	Prop	18 May 1999 (age 27)	21	(Uruguay) Peñarol
Mateo Sanguinetti	Prop	26 July 1992 (age 34)	100	(Uruguay) Peñarol
Felipe Aliaga	Lock	14 September 1999 (age 27)	27	(Italy) Parabiago
Ignacio Dotti	Lock	18 August 1994 (age 32)	77	(Portugal) Belenenses
Manuel Leindekar	Lock	23 April 1997 (age 29)	47	(Portugal) Grenoble
Manuel Rosmarino	Lock	15 January 2004 (age 22)	5	(Italy) Rangers Vicenza
Manuel Ardao	Back row	9 September 1998 (age 28)	43	(Portugal) Cascais
Lucas Bianchi	Back row	26 March 2001 (age 25)	31	(Italy) Viadana
Manuel Diana	Back row	7 March 1996 (age 30)	58	(Uruguay) Peñarol
Faustino Etchegorry	Back row		1	(Uruguay) Old Boys
Pedro Marsico	Back row		0	(Uruguay) Trébol
Mateo Sosa	Back row		0	(Uruguay) Los Cuervos
Pedro Suárez	Back row		0	(Uruguay) Old Christians
Ignacio Rodríguez Bosch	Scrum-half		3	(Uruguay) Old Boys
Pedro Hoblog	Scrum-half	14 June 2003 (age 23)	1	(Uruguay) Pucaru Stade Gaulois
Ícaro Amarillo	Fly-half	4 May 2004 (age 22)	10	(Portugal) Académica
Jean Cotarmanac'h	Fly-half	9 April 2005 (age 21)	5	(France) Vannes
Justo Ferrario	Fly-half	19 July 2006 (age 20)	3	(Uruguay) Peñarol
Juan Manuel Alonso	Centre	19 September 2001 (age 25)	24	(Uruguay) Peñarol
Felipe Arcos Pérez	Centre	17 May 2000 (age 26)	22	(Uruguay) Peñarol
Joaquín Súarez	Centre	6 November 2003 (age 23)	14	(Uruguay) Peñarol
Alfonso Perillo	Centre	25 February 2005 (age 21)	2	(Uruguay) Peñarol
Alfonso Vidal	Centre		4	(Uruguay) Old Boys
Ignacio Álvarez Akiki	Wing	28 February 2002 (age 24)	18	(Uruguay) Peñarol
Ignacio Facciolo	Wing	12 August 2001 (age 25)	4	(Uruguay) Peñarol
Juan Gonzalez	Fullback	12 April 2003 (age 23)	15	(England) Worcester Warriors
Manuel Parodi	Fullback		1	(Argentina) Champagnat

== Player career records ==
=== Most matches ===
#	Player	Pos	Tenure	Mat	Start	Sub	Pts	Tries	Won	Lost	Draw	%
1	Diego Magno	Flanker	2008-2024	107	65	42	60	12	50	55	2	46.73
2	Mateo Sanguinetti	Prop	2014-	100	84	16	20	4	50	49	1	50.00
3	Andres Vilaseca	Center	2013-	88	85	3	100	16	49	38	1	55.68
4	Gaston Mieres	Fullback	2010-2024	86	74	12	90	18	46	38	2	53.49
5	Rodrigo Silva	Fullback	2012-2023	78	71	7	114	19	41	37	0	52.56
6	Ignacio Dotti	Lock	2015-	77	55	22	20	4	43	33	1	55.84
7	German Kessler	Hooker	2015-	76	60	16	115	23	44	32	0	57.89
7	Leandro Leivas	Wing	2008-2019	76	63	13	120	24	32	42	2	42.11
7	Mario Sagario	Prop	2006-2019	76	53	23	5	1	32	42	2	42.11
10	Juan Manuel Gaminara	Flanker	2010-2019	71	66	5	35	7	34	35	2	47.89
10	Alejandro Nieto	Number 8	2012-2019	71	62	9	35	7	40	30	1	56.33

Last updated: Zimbabwe vs Uruguay, 14 November 2026. Statistics include officially capped matches only.

=== Most tries ===
#	Player	Pos	Span	Mat	Start	Sub	Pts	Tries
1	Diego Ormaechea	Number 8	1979-1999	54	51	3	151	33
2	Leandro Leivas	Wing	2008-2019	76	63	13	120	24
3	German Kessler	Hooker	2015-	76	60	16	115	23
4	Rodrigo Silva	Fullback	2012-2023	78	77	7	114	19
5	Gaston Mieres	Fullback	2010-2024	86	74	12	90	18
6	Santiago Arata	Scrum-half	2016-	52	36	16	80	16
6	Andrés Vilaseca	Center	2013-	88	85	3	100	16
8	Federico Sciarra	Scrum-half	1990-1999	40	38	2	272	14
9	Alfonso Cardoso	Centre	1995-2003	38	35	3	67	13
10	Diego Magno	Flanker	2008-2024	107	65	42	60	12

Last updated: Zimbabwe vs Uruguay, 14 November 2026. Statistics include officially capped matches only.

=== Most points ===
#	Player	Pos	Span	Mat	Pts	Tries	Conv	Pens	Drop
1	Felipe Berchesi	Fly-half	2011-2023	49	381	3	57	83	1
2	Federico Sciarra	Scrum-half	1990-1999	40	272	14	36	44	1
3	Juan Menchaca	Fullback	1998-2007	39	254	6	28	51	5
4	Jerónimo Etcheverry	Fly-half	2008-2016	45	213	8	37	30	3
5	Mathias Arocena	Fly-half	2005-2014	36	204	8	25	37	1
6	Federico Favaro	Wing	2013-2021	37	200	11	38	23	0
7	Marcelo Nicola	Fly-half	1989-1995	22	178	10	36	20	0
8	Agustín Ormaechea	Scrum-half	2011-2023	60	159	8	22	25	0
9	Jorge Zerbino	Flanker	1973-1985	27	157	8	19	29	0
10	Diego Ormaechea	Number 8	1979-1999	54	151	33	0	0	0

Last updated: Uruguay vs Georgia, 4 July 2026. Statistics include officially capped matches only.

=== Most matches as captain ===
#	Player	Pos	Span	Mat	Won	Lost	Draw	%	Pts	Tries
1	Juan Manuel Gaminara	Flanker	2016-2019	40	27	13	0	67.50	20	4
2	Diego Ormaechea	Number 8	1985-1999	37	20	17	0	54.05	109	23
3	Andres Vilaseca	Center	2019-2024	24	15	9	0	62.50	15	3
4	Jorge Zerbino	Flanker	1975–1985	20	12	6	2	60.00	120	7
5	Diego Aguirre	Fly-half	2002-2003	16	6	10	0	37.50	21	1

Last updated: Uruguay vs Georgia, 4 July 2026. Statistics include officially capped matches only.

== Notable players ==
- Diego Aguirre
- Rodrigo Capo Ortega
- Alfonso Cardoso
- Alejo Corral
- Diego Lamelas
- Juan Menchaca
- Diego Ormaechea
- Pablo Lemoine
- Juan Campomar
- Joaquin Pastore

== Coaches ==
=== Current coaching staff ===
Correct as of 29 August 2026

Position	Name
Head coach	Vacant
Assistant coach	Vacant
Assistant coach	Vacant
Assistant coach	Vacant
Skills coach	Vacant
Skills coach	Vacant
Skills coach	Vacant

=== Coaching history ===
Since the 1999 Rugby World Cup

Years	Coach
1994–2000	(Uruguay) Daniel Herrera
2001–2003	(Uruguay) Diego Ormaechea
2004–2005	(Uruguay) Sebastián Piñeyrúa
2006–2007	(Uruguay) Nicolás Inciarte & (Uruguay) Fernando Silva
2007	(Uruguay) José Brancato & (Uruguay) Francisco Berrutti
2007–2008	(Uruguay) Alberico Passadore
2008–2009	(Argentina) García Porcel
2009	(Uruguay) Felipe Puig
2010	(Argentina) Gonzalo Camardón
2011	(Uruguay) Sebastián Piñeyrúa
2011–2015	(Uruguay) Pablo Lemoine
2016–2023	(Argentina) Esteban Meneses
2024–2026	(Argentina) Rodolfo Ambrosio
2024–2026	(Uruguay) Guzmán Barreiro

== See also ==
- Rugby union in Uruguay
- Campeonato Uruguayo de Rugby – Club Championship of Uruguay
