= List of Uruguay national rugby union players =

List of Uruguay national rugby union players is a list of people who have played for the Uruguay national rugby union team. The list only includes players who have played in a Test match.

Note that the "position" column lists the position at which the player made his Test debut, not necessarily the position for which he is best known. A position in parentheses indicates that the player debuted as a substitute.

== Player list ==
Uruguay's International Rugby Capped Players
| Number | Name | Position | Date first cap obtained | Opposition |
|---|---|---|---|---|
| 1 | Alfredo Behrens | Flyhalf | 9-09-1951 | v Argentina at Buenos Aires |
| 2 | Robert Booth | No. 8 | 9-09-1951 | v Argentina at Buenos Aires |
| 3 | Alfredo Cat | Centre | 9-09-1951 | v Argentina at Buenos Aires |
| 4 | Carlos A. Cat | Prop | 9-09-1951 | v Argentina at Buenos Aires |
| 5 | Richard Day | Prop | 9-09-1951 | v Argentina at Buenos Aires |
| 6 | Malcolm Henderson | Fullback | 9-09-1951 | v Argentina at Buenos Aires |
| 7 | George Krieger | Scrum-half | 9-09-1951 | v Argentina at Buenos Aires |
| 8 | Eduardo Morelli | Lock | 9-09-1951 | v Argentina at Buenos Aires |
| 9 | Thomas Morton | Wing | 9-09-1951 | v Argentina at Buenos Aires |
| 10 | Francisco Nicola | Centre | 9-09-1951 | v Argentina at Buenos Aires |
| 11 | Guillermo Palmer | Flanker | 9-09-1951 | v Argentina at Buenos Aires |
| 12 | Bernardo Ramazzi | Lock | 9-09-1951 | v Argentina at Buenos Aires |
| 13 | Brian Rathbone | Flanker | 9-09-1951 | v Argentina at Buenos Aires |
| 14 | Francisco Rocco | Hooker | 9-09-1951 | v Argentina at Buenos Aires |
| 15 | Carlos Sierra | Wing | 9-09-1951 | v Argentina at Buenos Aires |
| 16 | Federico Armas | Wing | 13-09-1951 | v Chile at Buenos Aires |
| 17 | Nigel Davies | Scrum-half | 13-09-1951 | v Chile at Buenos Aires |
| 18 | Guy Furest | Wing | 13-09-1951 | v Chile at Buenos Aires |
| 19 | Alberto Puig | Lock | 13-09-1951 | v Chile at Buenos Aires |
| 20 | Antonio Rial | Prop | 13-09-1951 | v Chile at Buenos Aires |
| 21 | Pierre Chapt | Lock | 5-09-1953 | v Brazil at Montevideo |
| 22 | B.P. Devita | Wing | 5-09-1953 | v Brazil at Montevideo |
| 23 | Enrique Guillemette | Centre | 5-09-1953 | v Brazil at Montevideo |
| 24 | Miles Jones | Flyhalf | 5-09-1953 | v Brazil at Montevideo |
| 25 | Alejandro McGillivray | Flanker | 5-09-1953 | v Brazil at Montevideo |
| 26 | Harry Pugh | Hooker | 5-09-1953 | v Brazil at Montevideo |
| 27 | Carlos Reyes | Lock | 5-09-1953 | v Brazil at Montevideo |
| 28 | Juan Enrique Stein | Prop | 5-09-1953 | v Brazil at Montevideo |
| 29 | Jaime Cardoso | Flanker | 15-08-1956 | v Chile at Santiago |
| 30 | Manuel Gurmendez | Wing | 15-08-1956 | v Chile at Santiago |
| 31 | John Hyland | Hooker | 15-08-1956 | v Chile at Santiago |
| 32 | Eugenio Kramer | Prop | 15-08-1956 | v Chile at Santiago |
| 33 | Carlos López | Scrum-half | 15-08-1956 | v Chile at Santiago |
| 34 | Paul Mabott | Flyhalf | 15-08-1956 | v Chile at Santiago |
| 35 | Jorge Sagarra | No. 8 | 15-08-1956 | v Chile at Santiago |
| 36 | Rodolfo Skeri | Lock | 15-08-1956 | v Chile at Santiago |
| 37 | Pedro Stanham | Centre | 15-08-1956 | v Chile at Santiago |
| 38 | Pedro Aramendia | Fullback | 11-10-1958 | v Chile at Santiago |
| 39 | John Ayling | Flanker | 11-10-1958 | v Chile at Santiago |
| 40 | Hans Bergman | Lock | 11-10-1958 | v Chile at Santiago |
| 41 | Pedro Blanco | Wing | 11-10-1958 | v Chile at Santiago |
| 42 | Stanley Bowles | Lock | 11-10-1958 | v Chile at Santiago |
| 43 | Carlos Drever | Centre | 11-10-1958 | v Chile at Santiago |
| 44 | Mario Jurado | Prop | 11-10-1958 | v Chile at Santiago |
| 45 | Pedro Pick | Flanker | 11-10-1958 | v Chile at Santiago |
| 46 | Oscar Rodríguez | Centre | 11-10-1958 | v Chile at Santiago |
| 47 | Ricardo Vivo | Hooker | 11-10-1958 | v Chile at Santiago |
| 48 | Hugh Ruggeroni | Wing | 15-10-1958 | v Argentina at Vina del Mar |
| 49 | Humberto Vega | Fullback | 15-10-1958 | v Argentina at Vina del Mar |
| 50 | Eduardo Fynn | Prop | 18-10-1958 | v Peru at Santiago |
| 51 | Ceibal Regules | Flanker | 18-10-1958 | v Peru at Santiago |
| 52 | Jorge Trigo | Lock | 18-10-1958 | v Peru at Santiago |
| 53 | Alvaro Canessa | Lock | 20-08-1960 | v France XV at Montevideo |
| 54 | Agustín Canessa | Wing | 20-08-1960 | v France XV at Montevideo |
| 55 | Gonzalo Dupont | Prop | 20-08-1960 | v France XV at Montevideo |
| 56 | Bernardo Fontana | Centre | 20-08-1960 | v France XV at Montevideo |
| 57 | Roy Hubber | Scrum-half | 20-08-1960 | v France XV at Montevideo |
| 58 | Alex Hughes | Prop | 20-08-1960 | v France XV at Montevideo |
| 59 | Ernesto Llovet | Wing | 20-08-1960 | v France XV at Montevideo |
| 60 | Dicky Moor-Davie | Flyhalf | 20-08-1960 | v France XV at Montevideo |
| 61 | Penco | Centre | 20-08-1960 | v France XV at Montevideo |
| 62 | Gualtiero Sebasti | No. 8 | 20-08-1960 | v France XV at Montevideo |
| 63 | José Luis Shaw | Flanker | 20-08-1960 | v France XV at Montevideo |
| 64 | Luis Alberto Vazquez | Fullback | 20-08-1960 | v France XV at Montevideo |
| 65 | Carlos Baraibar | Wing | 8-10-1961 | v Brazil at Montevideo |
| 66 | Lucio Garcia Mansilla | Hooker | 8-10-1961 | v Brazil at Montevideo |
| 67 | Carlos Gómez | Flanker | 8-10-1961 | v Brazil at Montevideo |
| 68 | Charles Hughes | Flyhalf | 8-10-1961 | v Brazil at Montevideo |
| 69 | Alvaro Iruleguy | Flanker | 8-10-1961 | v Brazil at Montevideo |
| 70 | Sergio Lussich | Lock | 8-10-1961 | v Brazil at Montevideo |
| 71 | Juan Carlos Paysee | Centre | 8-10-1961 | v Brazil at Montevideo |
| 72 | Carlos Gutiérrez | Wing | 12-10-1961 | v Chile at Montevideo |
| 73 | Jorge Leindekar | Lock | 12-10-1961 | v Chile at Montevideo |
| 74 | Alberto Stewart | Scrum-half | 12-10-1961 | v Chile at Montevideo |
| 75 | José Pedro Artagaveytia | Prop | 14-10-1961 | v Argentina at Montevideo |
| 76 | Alejandro Moor-Davie | Scrum-half | 14-10-1961 | v Argentina at Montevideo |
| 77 | Hector Pepe | Lock | 14-10-1961 | v Argentina at Montevideo |
| 78 | Alberto Benquet | Flanker | 15-08-1963 | v Brazil at Montevideo |
| 79 | Rodolfo Cassarino | Fullback | 15-08-1963 | v Brazil at Montevideo |
| 80 | William Davies | No. 8 | 15-08-1963 | v Brazil at Montevideo |
| 81 | Alvaro López Castilla | Wing | 15-08-1963 | v Brazil at Montevideo |
| 82 | Nestor Pardo Iriondo | Hooker | 15-08-1963 | v Brazil at Montevideo |
| 83 | Andrés Pollak | Lock | 15-08-1963 | v Brazil at Montevideo |
| 84 | Jorge Pol Deus | Lock | 15-08-1963 | v Brazil at Montevideo |
| 85 | Alvaro Soto | Wing | 15-08-1963 | v Brazil at Montevideo |
| 86 | Gonzalo Estape | Prop | 15-08-1964 | v Argentina at San Pablo |
| 87 | Carlos Giavi | Prop | 15-08-1964 | v Argentina at San Pablo |
| 88 | José Gómez | Flanker | 15-08-1964 | v Argentina at San Pablo |
| 89 | Armando Lerma | Flyhalf | 15-08-1964 | v Argentina at San Pablo |
| 90 | Peter Lyford-Pike | Centre | 15-08-1964 | v Argentina at San Pablo |
| 91 | Diego Paysee | Fullback | 15-08-1964 | v Argentina at San Pablo |
| 92 | Martín Saavedra | No. 8 | 15-08-1964 | v Argentina at San Pablo |
| 93 | Donald Sedgfield | Scrum-half | 15-08-1964 | v Argentina at San Pablo |
| 94 | Jorge Gilberto Yorston | Wing | 15-08-1964 | v Argentina at San Pablo |
| 95 | Oscar Bacot Silveira | Flyhalf | 24-09-1967 | v Chile at Buenos Aires |
| 96 | Ricardo Bonner | Scrum-half | 24-09-1967 | v Chile at Buenos Aires |
| 97 | Gastón Costemale | Prop | 24-09-1967 | v Chile at Buenos Aires |
| 98 | Carlos Fossati | Lock | 24-09-1967 | v Chile at Buenos Aires |
| 99 | Rodolfo Hernández | Flanker | 24-09-1967 | v Chile at Buenos Aires |
| 100 | Raul Pollak | Flanker | 24-09-1967 | v Chile at Buenos Aires |
| 101 | Heriberto Stein | Centre | 24-09-1967 | v Chile at Buenos Aires |
| 102 | Anthoni Summer | Wing | 24-09-1967 | v Chile at Buenos Aires |
| 103 | Alfredo Faracco | Flanker | 27-09-1967 | v Argentina at Buenos Aires |
| 104 | Guillermo Hernández | Fullback | 27-09-1967 | v Argentina at Buenos Aires |
| 105 | Guido Magri | Scrum-half | 27-09-1967 | v Argentina at Buenos Aires |
| 106 | Gustavo Chiarino | Lock | 4-10-1969 | v Argentina at Santiago |
| 107 | Juan Antonio Chiarino | Lock | 4-10-1969 | v Argentina at Santiago |
| 108 | Bernardo Larre Borges | Centre | 4-10-1969 | v Argentina at Santiago |
| 109 | Andrés Miller | Flanker | 4-10-1969 | v Argentina at Santiago |
| 110 | Zak Orr | Wing | 4-10-1969 | v Argentina at Santiago |
| 111 | Juan Carlos Sartori | Wing | 4-10-1969 | v Argentina at Santiago |
| 112 | Juan Carlos Scasso | Hooker | 4-10-1969 | v Argentina at Santiago |
| 113 | Alfonso Tato | Flyhalf | 4-10-1969 | v Argentina at Santiago |
| 114 | Daniel Turcatti | Wing | 8-10-1969 | v Chile at Vina del Mar |
| 115 | Fabian Vejo | Flyhalf | 8-10-1969 | v Chile at Vina del Mar |
| 116 | Gonzalo Cassarino | Flanker | 10-10-1971 | v Paraguay at Montevideo |
| 117 | José Cassarino | Centre | 10-10-1971 | v Paraguay at Montevideo |
| 118 | Joaquín Castilla | Fullback | 10-10-1971 | v Paraguay at Montevideo |
| 119 | Carlos Dodero | Wing | 10-10-1971 | v Paraguay at Montevideo |
| 120 | Vladimir Jaugust | Prop | 10-10-1971 | v Paraguay at Montevideo |
| 121 | Gastón Lasarte | Prop | 10-10-1971 | v Paraguay at Montevideo |
| 122 | Francisco Manchoulas | Lock | 10-10-1971 | v Paraguay at Montevideo |
| 123 | Rodolfo Sayagues | Hooker | 10-10-1971 | v Paraguay at Montevideo |
| 124 | Michael Smith | Wing | 10-10-1971 | v Paraguay at Montevideo |
| 125 | Alvaro Mastroiani | (Wing) | 10-10-1971 | v Paraguay at Montevideo |
| 126 | Alfredo Menchaca | Flanker | 12-10-1971 | v Chile at Montevideo |
| 127 | Eduardo Suárez | Fullback | 12-10-1971 | v Chile at Montevideo |
| 128 | Roberto Canessa | Wing | 14-10-1971 | v Brazil at Montevideo |
| 129 | Roberto Jaugust | Lock | 14-10-1971 | v Brazil at Montevideo |
| 130 | Guillermo Jaume | Flanker | 14-10-1971 | v Brazil at Montevideo |
| 131 | Juan Manuel Montero | Flanker | 17-10-1971 | v Argentina at Montevideo |
| 132 | Pablo Behrens | Fullback | 14-10-1973 | v Chile at San Pablo |
| 133 | Miguel Diab | Prop | 14-10-1973 | v Chile at San Pablo |
| 134 | Pablo Iturria | Flyhalf | 14-10-1973 | v Chile at San Pablo |
| 135 | Eduardo Munyo | Centre | 14-10-1973 | v Chile at San Pablo |
| 136 | Abel Vivo | Wing | 14-10-1973 | v Chile at San Pablo |
| 137 | Roberto Wenzel | Prop | 14-10-1973 | v Chile at San Pablo |
| 138 | Gustavo Zerbino | Wing | 14-10-1973 | v Chile at San Pablo |
| 139 | Jorge Zerbino | Flanker | 14-10-1973 | v Chile at San Pablo |
| 140 | Arturo Beyhaut | Wing | 16-10-1973 | v Argentina at San Pablo |
| 141 | Gustavo Carrere | Prop | 16-10-1973 | v Argentina at San Pablo |
| 142 | Ricardo Mendoza | Prop | 16-10-1973 | v Argentina at San Pablo |
| 143 | Horacio Ocretich | Scrum-half | 16-10-1973 | v Argentina at San Pablo |
| 144 | Atilio Rienzi Saralegui | Flyhalf | 16-10-1973 | v Argentina at San Pablo |
| 145 | Enrique Stein | Lock | 16-10-1973 | v Argentina at San Pablo |
| 146 | Fernando Praderi | Hooker | 20-10-1973 | v Paraguay at San Pablo |
| 147 | Ignacio Amorin | Centre | 21-09-1975 | v Argentina at Asuncion |
| 148 | Jorge Etcheverria | No. 8 | 21-09-1975 | v Argentina at Asuncion |
| 149 | Raul Fajardo | Prop | 21-09-1975 | v Argentina at Asuncion |
| 150 | Juan José Gari | Flanker | 21-09-1975 | v Argentina at Asuncion |
| 151 | Roberto Hudson | Flyhalf | 21-09-1975 | v Argentina at Asuncion |
| 152 | Francisco Obes | Hooker | 21-09-1975 | v Argentina at Asuncion |
| 153 | José Obes | Wing | 21-09-1975 | v Argentina at Asuncion |
| 154 | Juan Peyrou | Lock | 21-09-1975 | v Argentina at Asuncion |
| 155 | Eduardo Viera | Wing | 21-09-1975 | v Argentina at Asuncion |
| 156 | Antonio Vizintin | Prop | 21-09-1975 | v Argentina at Asuncion |
| 157 | Jorge Fernandez Reyes | Hooker | 23-09-1975 | v Brazil at Asuncion |
| 158 | Rodolfo Merzario | Wing | 23-09-1975 | v Brazil at Asuncion |
| 159 | Juan Minut | No. 8 | 23-09-1975 | v Brazil at Asuncion |
| 160 | Pablo Morelli | Fullback | 23-09-1975 | v Brazil at Asuncion |
| 161 | Daniel Mutio | Scrum-half | 23-09-1975 | v Brazil at Asuncion |
| 162 | Rafael Zerbino | Lock | 23-09-1975 | v Brazil at Asuncion |
| 163 | José Luis Capezzuto | Flanker | 25-08-1976 | v Argentina XV at Montevideo |
| 164 | Gerardo Laenz | Lock | 25-08-1976 | v Argentina XV at Montevideo |
| 165 | Jorge Pedro Rignon | Prop | 25-08-1976 | v Argentina XV at Montevideo |
| 166 | José Maria Ubilla | Wing | 25-08-1976 | v Argentina XV at Montevideo |
| 167 | Mario Uria | Wing | 25-08-1976 | v Argentina XV at Montevideo |
| 168 | Daniel van Rompaey | Flanker | 25-08-1976 | v Argentina XV at Montevideo |
| 169 | Enrique Arechavaleta | (Wing) | 25-08-1976 | v Argentina XV at Montevideo |
| 170 | John Bird | (Prop) | 25-08-1976 | v Argentina XV at Montevideo |
| 171 | Alejandro Garcia Aust | (Flanker) | 25-08-1976 | v Argentina XV at Montevideo |
| 172 | Andrés Gianoli | (Wing) | 25-08-1976 | v Argentina XV at Montevideo |
| 173 | Juan Bordaberry | Flanker | 12-10-1976 | v NZ XV at Montevideo |
| 174 | Alberto Cibils | Scrum-half | 12-10-1976 | v NZ XV at Montevideo |
| 175 | Jorge Andrés Varela | Prop | 12-10-1976 | v NZ XV at Montevideo |
| 176 | Carlos Widemann | Wing | 12-10-1976 | v NZ XV at Montevideo |
| 177 | Mario Balinas | (Lock) | 12-10-1976 | v NZ XV at Montevideo |
| 178 | Pedro Crosta | Lock | 25-10-1977 | v Paraguay at Concepcion |
| 179 | José Gatti | Lock | 25-10-1977 | v Paraguay at Concepcion |
| 180 | Alejandro Nicolich | No. 8 | 25-10-1977 | v Paraguay at Concepcion |
| 181 | Marcelo Pereira | Centre | 25-10-1977 | v Paraguay at Concepcion |
| 182 | Diego Viana | Centre | 25-10-1977 | v Paraguay at Concepcion |
| 183 | Horacio Borrat | No. 8 | 27-10-1977 | v Chile at Concepcion |
| 184 | Alebrto Gari | Flanker | 27-10-1977 | v Chile at Concepcion |
| 185 | Alberto Villamil | Hooker | 28-10-1977 | v Argentina at Concepcion |
| 186 | José Barbe | Lock | 24-06-1979 | v Argentina XV at Montevideo |
| 187 | Eduardo Cerruti | Centre | 24-06-1979 | v Argentina XV at Montevideo |
| 188 | Martín Patino | Fullback | 24-06-1979 | v Argentina XV at Montevideo |
| 189 | Pedro Pineyrua | Flanker | 24-06-1979 | v Argentina XV at Montevideo |
| 190 | Rafael Ubilla | Flyhalf | 24-06-1979 | v Argentina XV at Montevideo |
| 191 | Carlos Calvo | (Centre) | 24-06-1979 | v Argentina XV at Montevideo |
| 192 | Carlos Vaccaro | Lock | 4-10-1979 | v Argentina at Santiago |
| 193 | Gustavo Mastroiani | Flanker | 6-10-1979 | v Brazil at Santiago |
| 194 | José Luis Nicola | Wing | 6-10-1979 | v Brazil at Santiago |
| 195 | Marcel Paullier | Prop | 6-10-1979 | v Brazil at Santiago |
| 196 | José Peirano | Wing | 6-10-1979 | v Brazil at Santiago |
| 197 | Diego Ormaechea | Prop | 9-10-1979 | v Paraguay at Santiago |
| 198 | Pablo Acerenza | Lock | 17-05-1981 | v Paraguay at Montevideo |
| 199 | Santiago Bordaberry | Flanker | 17-05-1981 | v Paraguay at Montevideo |
| 200 | Alberico Passadore | Scrum-half | 17-05-1981 | v Paraguay at Montevideo |
| 201 | Gabriel Puig | Wing | 17-05-1981 | v Paraguay at Montevideo |
| 202 | Nicolás Romay | Lock | 17-05-1981 | v Paraguay at Montevideo |
| 203 | Carlos Bonasso | Fullback | 21-05-1981 | v Brazil at Montevideo |
| 204 | Alejo Laurido | Flyhalf | 21-05-1981 | v Brazil at Montevideo |
| 205 | Daniel Mera | Scrum-half | 21-05-1981 | v Brazil at Montevideo |
| 206 | Gabriel Bomio | Wing | 16-07-1983 | v Paraguay at Buenos Aires |
| 207 | Ignacio Inciarte | Prop | 16-07-1983 | v Paraguay at Buenos Aires |
| 208 | Jorge Inciarte | Hooker | 16-07-1983 | v Paraguay at Buenos Aires |
| 209 | Juan Paladino | Lock | 16-07-1983 | v Paraguay at Buenos Aires |
| 210 | Carlos Uriarte | Flanker | 16-07-1983 | v Paraguay at Buenos Aires |
| 211 | José Brancato | (Fullback) | 16-07-1983 | v Paraguay at Buenos Aires |
| 212 | Alberto Baldomir | Wing | 20-07-1983 | v Chile at Buenos Aires |
| 213 | Eduardo Favaro | Centre | 20-07-1983 | v Chile at Buenos Aires |
| 214 | Nicolás Inciarte | Flanker | 20-07-1983 | v Chile at Buenos Aires |
| 215 | Diego Frederick | Centre | 30-06-1985 | v France XV at Montevideo |
| 216 | Miguel Ostazo | Hooker | 30-06-1985 | v France XV at Montevideo |
| 217 | Germán Pena | Scrum-half | 30-06-1985 | v France XV at Montevideo |
| 218 | Santiago Terra | Wing | 30-06-1985 | v France XV at Montevideo |
| 219 | Marcos Uriarte | Flanker | 30-06-1985 | v France XV at Montevideo |
| 220 | Alejandro Eirea | (Hooker) | 30-06-1985 | v France XV at Montevideo |
| 221 | Edgardo Martínez | (Lock) | 30-06-1985 | v France XV at Montevideo |
| 222 | Mauricio Salustio | (Prop) | 30-06-1985 | v France XV at Montevideo |
| 223 | Andrés Sommer | (Flanker) | 30-06-1985 | v France XV at Montevideo |
| 224 | Miguel Belluscio | Prop | 17-09-1985 | v Argentina at Asuncion |
| 225 | Ricardo Pigurina | Fullback | 17-09-1985 | v Argentina at Asuncion |
| 226 | Fernando Silva | Wing | 17-09-1985 | v Argentina at Asuncion |
| 227 | Andrés Pieroni | (Hooker) | 17-09-1985 | v Argentina at Asuncion |
| 228 | Martin Bocking | Flanker | 21-09-1985 | v Chile at Asuncion |
| 229 | Diego Cibils | Scrum-half | 21-09-1985 | v Chile at Asuncion |
| 230 | Daniel Muñoz | (Wing) | 21-09-1985 | v Chile at Asuncion |
| 231 | Mario Lamé | Lock | 3-05-1987 | v Argentina at Montevideo |
| 232 | Bernardo Saenz | Wing | 3-05-1987 | v Argentina at Montevideo |
| 233 | Marcelo Calandra | (Prop) | 3-05-1987 | v Argentina at Montevideo |
| 234 | Nicolás Terra | (Flanker) | 3-05-1987 | v Argentina at Montevideo |
| 235 | Pablo Abatte | Lock | 2-08-1987 | v Spain at Montevideo |
| 236 | Gabriel Alonso | Wing | 2-08-1987 | v Spain at Montevideo |
| 237 | Juan Cat | Fullback | 2-08-1987 | v Spain at Montevideo |
| 238 | Alejandro Silveira | Wing | 27-09-1987 | v Argentina at Santiago |
| 239 | Juan Decia Escardo | No. 8 | 3-09-1988 | v Belgium at Montevideo |
| 240 | Cesar Cat | Scrum-half | 7-10-1989 | v Brazil at Montevideo |
| 241 | Pablo Costabile | Wing | 7-10-1989 | v Brazil at Montevideo |
| 242 | Antonio Dabo | Flanker | 7-10-1989 | v Brazil at Montevideo |
| 243 | Pablo Diana | No. 8 | 7-10-1989 | v Brazil at Montevideo |
| 244 | Marcelo Nicola | Fullback | 7-10-1989 | v Brazil at Montevideo |
| 245 | Fernando Paullier | Centre | 7-10-1989 | v Brazil at Montevideo |
| 246 | Eduardo Berruti | Lock | 8-10-1989 | v Paraguay at Montevideo |
| 247 | Pablo Viglietti | Hooker | 8-10-1989 | v Paraguay at Montevideo |
| 248 | Federico Sciarra | Scrum-half | 3-11-1990 | v Chile at Santiago |
| 249 | Pedro Vecino | Centre | 3-11-1990 | v Chile at Santiago |
| 250 | Juan Pablo Blengio | (Flyhalf) | 3-11-1990 | v Chile at Santiago |
| 251 | Francisco de los Santos | (Hooker) | 3-11-1990 | v Chile at Santiago |
| 252 | Martín Panizza | (Flanker) | 3-11-1990 | v Chile at Santiago |
| 253 | Marcelo Shaw | (Wing) | 3-11-1990 | v Chile at Santiago |
| 254 | Juan Manuel Viacava | (Prop) | 3-11-1990 | v Chile at Santiago |
| 255 | Alvaro Luongo | Centre | 4-11-1990 | v Chile at Santiago |
| 256 | Ignacio Marques | Flyhalf | 4-11-1990 | v Chile at Santiago |
| 257 | Mauricio Mosca | (Flanker) | 8-09-1991 | v Chile at Santiago |
| 258 | Diego Lamelas | Hooker | 19-09-1992 | v Chile at Montevideo |
| 259 | Martín Mendaro | Scrum-half | 19-09-1992 | v Chile at Montevideo |
| 260 | Cesar Mosca | Fullback | 19-09-1992 | v Chile at Montevideo |
| 261 | Santiago Silva | Flyhalf | 19-09-1992 | v Chile at Montevideo |
| 262 | Alvaro Terra | Wing | 19-09-1992 | v Chile at Montevideo |
| 263 | Juan Carlos Bado | (Flanker) | 19-09-1992 | v Chile at Montevideo |
| 264 | Diego Aguirre | Wing | 20-09-1992 | v Chile at Montevideo |
| 265 | Santiago Zumaran | Lock | 20-09-1992 | v Chile at Montevideo |
| 266 | Gerardo Artola | Centre | 25-09-1993 | v Brazil at San Pablo |
| 267 | Martín Ferres | Wing | 25-09-1993 | v Brazil at San Pablo |
| 268 | Martín López | Flanker | 25-09-1993 | v Brazil at San Pablo |
| 269 | Diego Nairac | Prop | 25-09-1993 | v Brazil at San Pablo |
| 270 | Alejo Suárez | Hooker | 25-09-1993 | v Brazil at San Pablo |
| 271 | Agustín Ponce de Leon | (Flanker) | 25-09-1993 | v Brazil at San Pablo |
| 272 | Fernando Sosa Díaz | Scrum-half | 9-10-1993 | v Chile at Montevideo |
| 273 | Santiago Cat | Centre | 4-03-1995 | v Argentina at Buenos Aires |
| 274 | Hans Kuhffuss | Flanker | 4-03-1995 | v Argentina at Buenos Aires |
| 275 | Juan Machado | (Prop) | 4-03-1995 | v Argentina at Buenos Aires |
| 276 | Alfonso Cardoso | Wing | 2-09-1995 | v Spain at Montevideo |
| 277 | Pablo Lemoine | (Lock) | 2-09-1995 | v Spain at Montevideo |
| 278 | Fernando Sader | (Flanker) | 23-09-1995 | v Chile at Santiago |
| 279 | Nicolás Grille | Flanker | 8-06-1996 | v Argentina at Montevideo |
| 280 | Rodrigo Sánchez | Prop | 18-09-1996 | v Argentina at Hamilton |
| 281 | Guillermo Storace | Prop | 18-09-1996 | v Argentina at Hamilton |
| 282 | Manuel Reyes | (Wing) | 21-09-1996 | v USA at Markham |
| 283 | Sebastián Aguirre | Flyhalf | 24-08-1997 | v Chile at Montevideo |
| 284 | José Viana | (Wing) | 24-08-1997 | v Chile at Montevideo |
| 285 | Carlos Rodríguez | Wing | 20-09-1997 | v Paraguay at Asuncion |
| 286 | Diego Suárez | Flanker | 20-09-1997 | v Paraguay at Asuncion |
| 287 | Juan Labat | (Wing) | 20-09-1997 | v Paraguay at Asuncion |
| 288 | Diego Reyes | Wing | 27-09-1997 | v Argentina at Montevideo |
| 289 | Bernardo Amarillo | (Scrum-half) | 28-03-1998 | v Paraguay at Asuncion |
| 290 | Sebastian Mosquera | (Flanker) | 28-03-1998 | v Paraguay at Asuncion |
| 291 | Aram Chouldjian | Prop | 7-06-1998 | v Argentina XV at Buenos Aires |
| 292 | Federico Corletto | Wing | 7-06-1998 | v Argentina XV at Buenos Aires |
| 293 | Leonardo de Oliveira | Lock | 7-06-1998 | v Argentina XV at Buenos Aires |
| 294 | Alberto Sanabria | Prop | 7-06-1998 | v Argentina XV at Buenos Aires |
| 295 | Nicolás Brignoni | (Lock) | 7-06-1998 | v Argentina XV at Buenos Aires |
| 296 | Martín Hernández | (Prop) | 7-06-1998 | v Argentina XV at Buenos Aires |
| 297 | Guillermo Laffitte | (Flanker) | 15-08-1998 | v Canada at Buenos Aires |
| 298 | Juan Menchaca | (Fullback) | 10-10-1998 | v Paraguay at Montevideo |
| 299 | Martín Cervino | (Fullback) | 13-03-1999 | v Portugal at Montevideo |
| 300 | Juan Alzueta | (Prop) | 3-04-1999 | v Portugal at Lisbon |
| 301 | Juan Martín Marques | Centre | 26-08-1999 | v Fiji at L'Aquila |
| 302 | Emiliano Caffera | Scrum-half | 22-09-2000 | v Namibia at Montevideo |
| 303 | Hilario Canessa | Centre | 22-09-2000 | v Namibia at Montevideo |
| 304 | Emiliano Ibarra | Fullback | 22-09-2000 | v Namibia at Montevideo |
| 305 | Mauricio Lapetina | Hooker | 22-09-2000 | v Namibia at Montevideo |
| 306 | Pablo Pagani | Flanker | 22-09-2000 | v Namibia at Montevideo |
| 307 | Fernando Ponte | Prop | 22-09-2000 | v Namibia at Montevideo |
| 308 | Aldo Bertolotti | (Prop) | 22-09-2000 | v Namibia at Montevideo |
| 309 | Diego Bessio | (Hooker) | 22-09-2000 | v Namibia at Montevideo |
| 310 | Ignacio Conti | (Flanker) | 22-09-2000 | v Namibia at Montevideo |
| 311 | Joaquín de Freitas | (Centre) | 22-09-2000 | v Namibia at Montevideo |
| 312 | Marcelo Gutiérrez | (Lock) | 22-09-2000 | v Namibia at Montevideo |
| 313 | Rafael Sánchez | (Scrum-half) | 22-09-2000 | v Namibia at Montevideo |
| 314 | Rodrigo Capó Ortega | (Lock) | 12-11-2000 | v Chile at Montevideo |
| 315 | Gonzalo Silva | Wing | 18-11-2000 | v Argentina XV at Montevideo |
| 316 | Alfredo Delgado | Wing | 12-04-2001 | v Argentina XV at Buenos Aires |
| 317 | Fernando Auespberg | (Lock) | 12-04-2001 | v Argentina XV at Buenos Aires |
| 318 | Martín Grille | (Wing) | 12-04-2001 | v Argentina XV at Buenos Aires |
| 319 | Uriel Sokolovich | (Flanker) | 12-04-2001 | v Argentina XV at Buenos Aires |
| 320 | Agustín Urrestarazu | Scrum-half | 23-05-2001 | v Canada at Hamilton |
| 321 | Benjamin Bono | No. 8 | 1-09-2001 | v Spain at Montevideo |
| 322 | Juan Horta | (Flanker) | 1-09-2001 | v Spain at Montevideo |
| 323 | Juan Andrés Pérez | (Hooker) | 1-09-2001 | v Spain at Montevideo |
| 324 | Oscar Caviglia | Centre | 6-10-2001 | v Paraguay at Montevideo |
| 325 | Santiago de Castro | Scrum-half | 6-10-2001 | v Paraguay at Montevideo |
| 326 | Ricardo Sierra | Flyhalf | 6-10-2001 | v Paraguay at Montevideo |
| 327 | Juan Álvarez | (Lock) | 6-10-2001 | v Paraguay at Montevideo |
| 328 | Tomás Vecino | (Flanker) | 6-10-2001 | v Paraguay at Montevideo |
| 329 | Bernardo Acle | Prop | 24-11-2001 | v Argentina A at Buenos Aires |
| 330 | Juan Bautista Bado | Lock | 24-11-2001 | v Argentina A at Buenos Aires |
| 331 | Juan Beyhaut | Centre | 24-11-2001 | v Argentina A at Buenos Aires |
| 332 | Oscar Durán | Prop | 24-11-2001 | v Argentina A at Buenos Aires |
| 333 | Carlos Letamendia | Lock | 24-11-2001 | v Argentina A at Buenos Aires |
| 334 | Agustín Vazquez | Scrum-half | 24-11-2001 | v Argentina A at Buenos Aires |
| 335 | Guzman Zanandrea | Centre | 24-11-2001 | v Argentina A at Buenos Aires |
| 336 | Enrique Zeballos | Flyhalf | 24-11-2001 | v Argentina A at Buenos Aires |
| 337 | Juan Díaz | (Hooker) | 24-11-2001 | v Argentina A at Buenos Aires |
| 338 | Francisco Vilaboa | Wing | 28-04-2002 | v Argentina at Mendoza |
| 339 | Matías Aguirre | (Scrum-half) | 28-04-2002 | v Argentina at Mendoza |
| 340 | Hernan Ponte | (No. 8) | 28-04-2002 | v Argentina at Mendoza |
| 341 | Joaquín Pastore | Fullback | 27-04-2003 | v Chile at Montevideo |
| 342 | Ignacio Lussich | (Lock) | 27-04-2003 | v Chile at Montevideo |
| 343 | Juan Campomar | Scrum-half | 30-04-2003 | v Paraguay at Canelones |
| 344 | Antonio Suárez | Prop | 30-04-2003 | v Paraguay at Canelones |
| 345 | Carlos Baldassari | Wing | 27-08-2003 | v Argentina at Buenos Aires |
| 346 | Juan Bachini | Hooker | 24-04-2004 | v Venezuela at Santiago |
| 347 | Agustín Pereira | Flyhalf | 24-04-2004 | v Venezuela at Santiago |
| 348 | Joaquín Pérez | Lock | 24-04-2004 | v Venezuela at Santiago |
| 349 | Tomás Pineyrua | Scrum-half | 24-04-2004 | v Venezuela at Santiago |
| 350 | Luis Ara | (Flanker) | 24-04-2004 | v Venezuela at Santiago |
| 351 | Francisco Bulanti | (Centre) | 24-04-2004 | v Venezuela at Santiago |
| 352 | Federico Capo Ortega | (Prop) | 24-04-2004 | v Venezuela at Santiago |
| 353 | Ignacio Crosa | (Lock) | 24-04-2004 | v Venezuela at Santiago |
| 354 | Alfredo Giuria | (No. 8) | 24-04-2004 | v Venezuela at Santiago |
| 355 | Agustín Pérez del Castillo | (Fullback) | 24-04-2004 | v Venezuela at Santiago |
| 356 | Rafael Álvarez | (Lock) | 28-04-2004 | v Argentina at Santiago |
| 357 | Diego Silveira | (No. 8) | 28-04-2004 | v Argentina at Santiago |
| 358 | Claudio Cattivelli | (Centre) | 1-05-2004 | v Chile at Santiago |
| 359 | Ivo Dugonjic | Wing | 30-10-2004 | v Georgia at Montevideo |
| 360 | Carlos Arboleya | (Prop) | 30-10-2004 | v Georgia at Montevideo |
| 361 | Roberto Pose | (Prop) | 30-10-2004 | v Georgia at Montevideo |
| 362 | Nicolás Morales | (Centre) | 6-11-2004 | v Portugal at Montevideo |
| 363 | Sebastian Ramos | (Scrum-half) | 6-11-2004 | v Portugal at Montevideo |
| 364 | Mathías Arocena | (Flyhalf) | 11-05-2005 | v Chile at Buenos Aires |
| 365 | Diego Bertacchi | (Prop) | 11-05-2005 | v Chile at Buenos Aires |
| 366 | Gastón Ibarburu | (Prop) | 11-05-2005 | v Chile at Buenos Aires |
| 367 | Gonzalo Peyrou | (Flanker) | 11-05-2005 | v Chile at Buenos Aires |
| 368 | Juan Pablo Durán | (Replacement) | 15-05-2005 | v Argentina at Buenos Aires |
| 369 | Carlos Protasi | (Flanker) | 15-05-2005 | v Argentina at Buenos Aires |
| 370 | Dario Cano | Lock | 12-11-2005 | v Portugal at Estoril |
| 371 | Santiago Carracedo | Flanker | 12-11-2005 | v Portugal at Estoril |
| 372 | Martín Espiga Telleria | Prop | 12-11-2005 | v Portugal at Estoril |
| 373 | Rodrigo Klappenbach | Scrum-half | 12-11-2005 | v Portugal at Estoril |
| 374 | Nicolás Klappenbach | Hooker | 12-11-2005 | v Portugal at Estoril |
| 375 | Juan Labat | Wing | 12-11-2005 | v Portugal at Estoril |
| 376 | Facundo Cadenas | (Flanker) | 12-11-2005 | v Portugal at Estoril |
| 377 | Guillermo Gallo | (Scrum-half) | 12-11-2005 | v Portugal at Estoril |
| 378 | Juan Martín Llovet | Centre | 8-07-2006 | v Argentina at Buenos Aires |
| 379 | Gustavo Voituret | (Centre) | 8-07-2006 | v Argentina at Buenos Aires |
| 380 | Francisco de Posadas | Wing | 22-07-2006 | v Chile at Montevideo |
| 381 | Mario Sagario | (Prop) | 22-07-2006 | v Chile at Montevideo |
| 382 | Martín Crosa | Flyhalf | 2-06-2007 | v Italy at Montevideo |
| 383 | Santiago Ariano | (Flanker) | 2-06-2007 | v Italy at Montevideo |
| 384 | Sebastian Levaggi | (Prop) | 2-06-2007 | v Italy at Montevideo |
| 385 | Manuel Martínez | (Scrum-half) | 2-06-2007 | v Italy at Montevideo |
| 386 | Gastón Szabo | (Prop) | 2-06-2007 | v Italy at Montevideo |
| 387 | Pablo Bueno | (Wing) | 18-08-2007 | v Spain at Montevideo |
| 388 | Horacio Rivera | (Flanker) | 18-08-2007 | v Spain at Montevideo |
| 389 | Andrés Vazquez | Fullback | 25-08-2007 | v Chile at Santiago |
| 390 | Alvaro Aquistapache | (Flanker) | 25-08-2007 | v Chile at Santiago |
| 391 | Martín Campodonico | (Flanker) | 25-08-2007 | v Chile at Santiago |
| 392 | Agustín del Castillo | Flyhalf | 31-05-2008 | v Argentina at Montevideo |
| 393 | Santiago Vilaseca | Flanker | 31-05-2008 | v Argentina at Montevideo |
| 394 | Juan Pablo Horta | (Flanker) | 31-05-2008 | v Argentina at Montevideo |
| 395 | Juan Rombys | (Prop) | 31-05-2008 | v Argentina at Montevideo |
| 396 | Juan Pablo Orta | (Back-row) | 11-06-2008 | v Romania at Bucharest |
| 397 | Santiago Rodino | (Centre) | 15-06-2008 | v Georgia at Bucharest |
| 398 | Diego Magno | (Lock) | 20-06-2008 | v Russia at Bucharest |
| 399 | Jerónimo Etcheverry | Fullback | 8-11-2008 | v USA at Sandy |
| 400 | Enrico Laitano | Lock | 8-11-2008 | v USA at Sandy |
| 401 | Matías Fonseca | (Lock) | 8-11-2008 | v USA at Sandy |
| 402 | Leandro Leivas | (Wing) | 8-11-2008 | v USA at Sandy |
| 403 | Tomas Jolivet | Wing | 22-11-2008 | v Chile at Montevideo |
| 404 | Ignacio Barcos | No. 8 | 25-04-2009 | v Paraguay at Montevideo |
| 405 | Miguel Horta | Flanker | 25-04-2009 | v Paraguay at Montevideo |
| 406 | Alejandro Silveira | Wing | 25-04-2009 | v Paraguay at Montevideo |
| 407 | Santiago Gibernau | (Wing) | 25-04-2009 | v Paraguay at Montevideo |
| 408 | Gonzalo Campomar | (Flanker) | 23-05-2009 | v Argentina at Montevideo |
| 409 | Alejo Corral | (Prop) | 14-11-2009 | v USA at Montevideo |
| 410 | Juan de Freitas | (Replacement) | 21-11-2009 | v USA at Lauderhill |
| 411 | Santiago Arocena | Wing | 13-05-2010 | v Brazil at Santiago |
| 412 | Nicolás Badano | Lock | 13-05-2010 | v Brazil at Santiago |
| 413 | Matías Benitez | Prop | 13-05-2010 | v Brazil at Santiago |
| 414 | Mathías Braun Bassini | Flanker | 13-05-2010 | v Brazil at Santiago |
| 415 | Santiago Deicas | Flanker | 13-05-2010 | v Brazil at Santiago |
| 416 | Santiago Gortari | Wing | 13-05-2010 | v Brazil at Santiago |
| 417 | Ignacio Grignola | No. 8 | 13-05-2010 | v Brazil at Santiago |
| 418 | Adrian Lewis | Centre | 13-05-2010 | v Brazil at Santiago |
| 419 | Juan Pablo Ruffalini | Hooker | 13-05-2010 | v Brazil at Santiago |
| 420 | Diego Lussich | (Replacement) | 13-05-2010 | v Brazil at Santiago |
| 421 | Gastón Mieres | (Replacement) | 13-05-2010 | v Brazil at Santiago |
| 422 | Martín Sciarra | Flanker | 21-05-2010 | v Argentina at Santiago |
| 423 | Nicolás Martínez | (Wing) | 19-06-2010 | v Russia at Harrison |
| 424 | Juan Manuel Gaminara | (No. 8) | 13-11-2010 | v Romania at Montevideo |
| 425 | Juan Ignacio Tabarez | (Flanker) | 13-11-2010 | v Romania at Montevideo |
| 426 | Javier Ameglio | Lock | 14-05-2011 | v Paraguay at Cataratas |
| 427 | Arturo Avalo | Hooker | 14-05-2011 | v Paraguay at Cataratas |
| 428 | Diego Bascou | Flanker | 14-05-2011 | v Paraguay at Cataratas |
| 429 | Rodolfo de Mula Reyes | Prop | 14-05-2011 | v Paraguay at Cataratas |
| 430 | Ignacio Inchausti | Wing | 14-05-2011 | v Paraguay at Cataratas |
| 431 | Francisco Jimenez Larre Borges | Prop | 14-05-2011 | v Paraguay at Cataratas |
| 432 | Guillermo Lijtenstein López de Haro | Scrum-half | 14-05-2011 | v Paraguay at Cataratas |
| 433 | Alberto Román | Centre | 14-05-2011 | v Paraguay at Cataratas |
| 434 | Cristofer Soares de Lima | Lock | 14-05-2011 | v Paraguay at Cataratas |
| 435 | Pedro Crosta | (Lock) | 14-05-2011 | v Paraguay at Cataratas |
| 436 | Mathías Palomeque | Lock | 17-05-2011 | v Brazil at Cataratas |
| 437 | Gastón Gaminara | Wing | 25-05-2011 | v Argentina at Posadas |
| 438 | Joan Novoa | Centre | 25-05-2011 | v Argentina at Posadas |
| 439 | Pedro Costa | (Lock) | 25-05-2011 | v Argentina at Posadas |
| 440 | Nicolás Datindrade | (Hooker) | 25-05-2011 | v Argentina at Posadas |
| 441 | Fernando Bascou | Flanker | 13-11-2011 | v Portugal at Caldas da Rainha |
| 442 | Federico Berchesi | Flanker | 13-11-2011 | v Portugal at Caldas da Rainha |
| 443 | Felipe Berchesi | Flyhalf | 13-11-2011 | v Portugal at Caldas da Rainha |
| 444 | Agustín Ormaechea | Centre | 13-11-2011 | v Portugal at Caldas da Rainha |
| 445 | Juan Diego Ormaechea | No. 8 | 13-11-2011 | v Portugal at Caldas da Rainha |
| 446 | Francisco Vecino Capurro | Scrum-half | 13-11-2011 | v Portugal at Caldas da Rainha |
| 447 | Rodrigo Espiga | Flanker | 19-11-2011 | v Spain at Madrid |
| 448 | Rodrigo Martínez | Wing | 20-05-2012 | v Argentina at Santiago |
| 449 | Alejandro Nieto | No. 8 | 20-05-2012 | v Argentina at Santiago |
| 450 | Alejo Durán | (Replacement) | 8-06-2012 | v Romania at Bucharest |
| 451 | Franco Lamanna | (Flanker) | 8-06-2012 | v Romania at Bucharest |
| 452 | Rodrigo Silva | (Flyhalf) | 11-11-2012 | v Portugal at Montevideo |
| 453 | Andrés Vilaseca | Wing | 27-04-2013 | v Argentina at Montevideo |
| 454 | Federico Favaro | Wing | 1-05-2013 | v Brazil at Montevideo |
| 455 | Joaquín Prada | Centre | 7-06-2013 | v South Africa President's XI at Tbilisi |
| 456 | Germán Albanell Herrera | (Replacement) | 7-06-2013 | v South Africa President's XI at Tbilisi |
| 457 | Santiago Core | (Wing) | 7-06-2013 | v South Africa President's XI at Tbilisi |
| 458 | Juan Tassistro | (Flanker) | 7-06-2013 | v South Africa President's XI at Tbilisi |
| 459 | Maximiliano Gonzalez Gómez | Wing | 11-06-2013 | v Georgia at Tbilisi |
| 460 | Sebastian Sagario | Flanker | 11-06-2013 | v Georgia at Tbilisi |
| 461 | Gastón Gibernau Arredondo | (Wing) | 11-06-2013 | v Georgia at Tbilisi |
| 462 | José Coronel | (Lock) | 16-06-2013 | v Emerging Ireland at Tbilisi |
| 463 | Carlos Pombo | (Hooker) | 29-03-2014 | v USA at Atlanta |
| 464 | Matías Beer | Lock | 26-04-2014 | v Paraguay at Asuncion |
| 465 | Nicolás Freitas | Centre | 26-04-2014 | v Paraguay at Asuncion |
| 466 | Francisco López | Fullback | 26-04-2014 | v Paraguay at Asuncion |
| 467 | Santiago Martinez Etcheverry | Wing | 26-04-2014 | v Paraguay at Asuncion |
| 468 | Agustín Alonso | (No. 8) | 26-04-2014 | v Paraguay at Asuncion |
| 469 | Juan Echeverría | (Prop) | 26-04-2014 | v Paraguay at Asuncion |
| 470 | Gabriel Puig Carpaneto | (Lock) | 26-04-2014 | v Paraguay at Asuncion |
| 471 | Mateo Sanguinetti | (Prop) | 26-04-2014 | v Paraguay at Asuncion |
| 472 | Pedro Deal Herran | (Wing) | 3-05-2014 | v Brazil at Bento Gonsalves |
| 473 | Manuel Blengio | Flyhalf | 11-04-2015 | v Paraguay at Montevideo |
| 474 | Germán Kessler | Hooker | 11-04-2015 | v Paraguay at Montevideo |
| 475 | Jorge Zerbino Stajano | Lock | 11-04-2015 | v Paraguay at Montevideo |
| 476 | Ignacio Dotti | (Lock) | 11-04-2015 | v Paraguay at Montevideo |
| 477 | Rodrigo Bocking | Centre | 18-04-2015 | v Brazil at Montevideo |
| 478 | Santiago Arata | (Scrum-half) | 6-02-2016 | v Canada at Langford |
| 479 | Facundo Gattas | (Prop) | 6-02-2016 | v Canada at Langford |
| 480 | Rafael Mones | (Prop) | 6-02-2016 | v Canada at Langford |
| 481 | Gonzalo Soto Mera | (Lock) | 6-02-2016 | v Canada at Langford |
| 482 | Lucas Lacoste | (Flanker) | 12-02-2016 | v Brazil at Sao Paulo |
| 483 | Ignacio Secco | (Prop) | 12-02-2016 | v Brazil at Sao Paulo |
| 484 | Martín Secco | (Fullback) | 12-02-2016 | v Brazil at Sao Paulo |
| 485 | Facundo Klappenbach Zucchi | Centre | 20-02-2016 | v Argentina at Punte de l'Este |
| 486 | Andrés Rocco | Wing | 20-02-2016 | v Argentina at Punte de l'Este |
| 487 | Mauro Daverio | Wing | 23-04-2016 | v Brazil at Sao Jose dos Campos |
| 488 | Joaquín Dell'Acqua Steffano | (Flanker) | 23-04-2016 | v Brazil at Sao Jose dos Campos |
| 489 | Gastón Nicolas | (Flyhalf) | 23-04-2016 | v Brazil at Sao Jose dos Campos |
| 490 | Mateo Tortorella | (Fullback) | 23-04-2016 | v Brazil at Sao Jose dos Campos |
| 491 | Diego Ayala Etchart | Lock | 30-04-2016 | v Paraguay at Asuncion |
| 492 | Diego Arbelo | (No. 8) | 30-04-2016 | v Paraguay at Asuncion |
| 493 | Marcos Brovetto Assanelli | (Wing) | 30-04-2016 | v Paraguay at Asuncion |
| 494 | Santiago Hernández | Flanker | 12-11-2016 | v Germany at Frankfurt-am-Main |
| 495 | Juan Manuel Cat | (Fullback) | 12-11-2016 | v Germany at Frankfurt-am-Main |
| 496 | Marcos Chamyan | (Flanker) | 26-11-2016 | v Romania at Bucharest |
| 497 | Rodolfo Garese Zerbino | Flanker | 4-02-2017 | v USA at San Antonio |
| 498 | Francisco Berchesi | (Wing) | 4-02-2017 | v USA at San Antonio |
| 499 | Felipe Inciarte Stirling | (Prop) | 4-02-2017 | v USA at San Antonio |
| 500 | Diego Pombo Faux | (Hooker) | 4-02-2017 | v USA at San Antonio |
| 501 | Manuel Diana | (No. 8) | 11-02-2017 | v Argentina XV at Bahia Blanca |
| 502 | Lucas Durán | (Flyhalf) | 11-02-2017 | v Argentina XV at Bahia Blanca |
| 503 | Ignacio Garcia Curbelo | (Wing) | 11-02-2017 | v Argentina XV at Bahia Blanca |
| 504 | Lorenzo Surraco | (Lock) | 18-02-2017 | v Brazil at Punte de l'Este |
| 505 | Manuel Leindekar | (No. 8) | 13-05-2017 | v Paraguay at Asuncion |
| 506 | Agustín Della Corte | (Flyhalf) | 10-06-2017 | v Emerging Italy at Montevideo |
| 507 | Andrés de Leon Garcia | Flyhalf | 9-02-2018 | v Brazil at Pacaembu |
| 508 | Tomás Inciarte | (Flyhalf) | 9-02-2018 | v Brazil at Pacaembu |
| 509 | Juan Manuel Etcheverry | (Lock) | 24-02-2018 | v Chile at Santiago |
| 510 | Leandro Segredo Martínez Lamas | Flanker | 2-06-2018 | v Fiji Warriors at Las Piedras |
| 511 | Manuel Ardao | Hooker | 17-11-2018 | v Fiji at Hartpury |
| 512 | Guillermo Pujadas | (Hooker) | 17-11-2018 | v Fiji at Hartpury |
| 513 | Juan Manuel Rodríguez | Lock | 8-02-2019 | v Chile at Montevideo |
| 514 | Joaquín Alonso | (Scrum-half) | 8-02-2019 | v Chile at Montevideo |
| 515 | Santiago Pineyrua Frederick | Lock | 23-02-2019 | v Argentina XV at Buenos Aires |
| 516 | Santiago Civetta | (Lock) | 23-02-2019 | v Argentina XV at Buenos Aires |
| 517 | Joaquín Jaunsolo | (Prop) | 23-02-2019 | v Argentina XV at Buenos Aires |
| 518 | Mateo Mari | (No. 8) | 23-02-2019 | v Argentina XV at Buenos Aires |
| 519 | Ignacio Rodríguez Bosch | (Scrum-half) | 23-02-2019 | v Argentina XV at Buenos Aires |
| 520 | Felipe Etcheverry | Fullback | 4-06-2019 | v Russia at Montevideo |
| 521 | Juan Pablo Constabile Lenguas | (Wing) | 4-06-2019 | v Russia at Montevideo |
| 522 | Felipe Aliaga | Lock | 1-11-2020 | v Spain at Montevideo |
| 523 | Juanjuan Garese | Lock | 1-11-2020 | v Spain at Montevideo |
| 524 | Eric Dosantos | (Lock) | 1-11-2020 | v Spain at Montevideo |
| 525 | Ignacio Péculo | (Prop) | 1-11-2020 | v Spain at Montevideo |
| 526 | José Iruleguy Gonzalez | (Fullback) | 6-11-2020 | v Spain at Montevideo |
| 527 | Mateo Perillo | (Prop) | 6-11-2020 | v Spain at Montevideo |
| 528 | Felipe Arcos Pérez | Centre | 25-07-2021 | v Brazil at Montevideo |
| 529 | Baltazar Amaya | (Wing) | 7-11-2021 | v Romania at VR |
| 530 | Mateo Viñals | | 20-11-2021 | v Italy at Parma |
| 531 | Juan Manuel Alonso | | 20-11-2021 | v Italy at Parma |
| 532 | Lucas Bianchi | | 18-06-2022 | v Japan at Tokyo |
| 533 | Carlos Deus | | 18-06-2022 | v Japan at Tokyo |
| 534 | Tomás Etcheverry | | 18-06-2022 | v Japan at Tokyo |
| 535 | Emiliano Faccenini | | 18-06-2022 | v Japan at Tokyo |
| 536 | Santiago Álvarez | | 18-06-2022 | v Japan at Tokyo |
| 537 | Bautista Basso | | 22-06-2022 | v Japan at Fukuoka |
| 538 | Matías Franco | | 22-06-2022 | v Japan at Fukuoka |
| 539 | Juan Zuccarino | | 6-11-2022 | v Georgia at Tbilisi |
| 540 | Reinaldo Piussi | | 19-11-2022 | v Tonga at Bucharest |
| 541 | Ignacio Facciolo | | 5-08-2023 | v Namibia at Montevideo |
| 542 | Diego Ardao | | 5-08-2023 | v Namibia at Montevideo |
| 543 | Juan Manuel Tafernaberry | | 5-08-2023 | v Namibia at Montevideo |
| 544 | Ignacio Álvarez | | 5-08-2023 | v Namibia at Montevideo |
