= Rugby union in Uruguay =

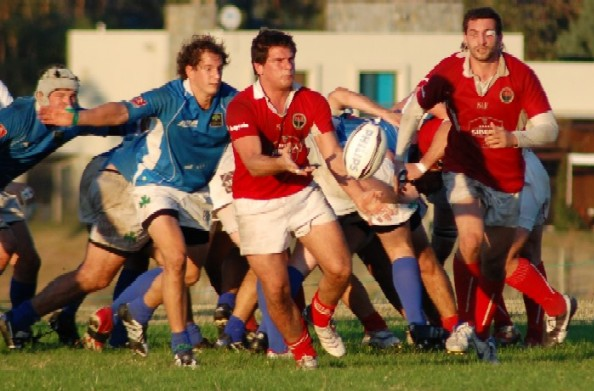
- PSG rugby vs OCC, Montevideo
- Country: Uruguay
- Governing body: Unión de Rugby del Uruguay
- National team: Uruguay
- Nickname: Los Teros
- First played: 1880
- Registered players: 37,463
- Clubs: 28

National competitions
- Rugby World Cup; Rugby World Cup Sevens; IRB Sevens World Series

Club competitions
- Campeonato Uruguayo; Punta Del Este Sevens

Rugby union in Uruguay is considered a popular sport. The Uruguay national team, commonly known as Los Teros, have been playing international rugby since the late 1940s and have made appearances in five Rugby World Cups: 1999, 2003, 2015, 2019 and 2023.

Rugby union is a popular recreational sport in Uruguay. Rugby union is considered the third most popular sport, behind association football (soccer) and basketball. The popularity of rugby union took off after the national side qualified for the 1999 Rugby World Cup and the subsequent 2003 World Cup, this saw a renewed interest in the sport and broad media coverage of the game.

== Governing body ==
The Unión de Rugby del Uruguay is the governing body for rugby union in Uruguay. The organisation was founded in 1951 and became an official affiliate of the International Rugby Board (IRB) in 1989. It is also a member of CONSUR.

== History ==
=== Early history ===
There is some argument as to who introduced the sport to the country. The British Schools of Montevideo claim that they were the first to play the game in the country. However, the growth of rugby in Uruguay can be attributed largely to the schools of the Christian Brothers which introduced the game from Ireland in the early twentieth century. Their schools tended to play rugby union, whereas those of the Jesuits played football.

Rugby was being played in neighbouring Argentina and Brazil in the late nineteenth century, mainly by British immigrants, and there is some evidence of this within Uruguay itself. English cricket clubs were the incubators of rugby in South America, although rugby has survived much better in these countries than cricket has. It has been claimed that Montevideo Cricket Club (MVCC) played rugby football as early as 1865, but the first certain match was between Uruguayans and British members of the MVCC in 1880. The MVCC claims to be the oldest rugby club outside Europe. One observer, apparently disdainful of the Britons mixing with the "natives", found the 1880 match to be:

"...at the same time sublime and ridiculous... [that the] young sons of distinguished families practising the games of the Anglo-Saxon in their youth and young Englishmen of blond Albion, face to face ... and on all sides [were] people strangely dressed who ran and shouted, pushed, fell, rose and finished by joining to form now a circle, now a pyramid, now a compact mass in which one could only distinguish heads without shoulders, legs without bodies and hands without arms."

=== Post-War period ===
After the Second World War, there was something of a revival, thanks largely to Carlos E. Cat, who had played for San Isidro (CASI) in the 1920s. Uruguay's rugby union international debut came in 1948, where they played a friendly match against Chile, which they eventually lost 21–3.

In 1949, "rugby criollo" was introduced into the Carrasco Polo Club, which not unlike the MVCC, would become more renowned for rugby than the sport it was named for.

In 1950, the Campeonato Uruguayo was held for first time, being today the main local competition. Its success led to the formation of the sports new governing body, the Uruguayan Rugby Union, in January 1951, with Carlos Cat as its first president. The first Club Championship was contested by Old Boys, Colonia Rugby, and multisport clubs such as Montevideo Cricket Club (MVCC) and Carrasco Polo (which supplied two XVs).

A second international followed in '51, against a vastly more experienced Argentina team, in the South American Championship. Again Uruguay were defeated this time 62–0. Uruguay, however did beat Chile in this championship. Following these matches Uruguay did not have a solid international calendar, so their next international match would be five years later, against Chile.

One consequence was that Argentina's governing body could no longer call itself the "River Plate Rugby Union", as Uruguay occupied the east bank, and had to rename itself the UAR in November 1951.

=== 1970s onwards ===
The 1970s saw a much better period for rugby union in Uruguay in comparison to previous decades with an increase in player numbers. The national team started off with a win over Paraguay in 1971, which was followed by a win and loss against Chile and a win against Brazil. They were beaten by Argentina by 55 points on two occasions in the early 1970s. However, except for these two against Argentina, they won all their matches. This led to a huge rise in the game's profile in Uruguay.

Carrasco Polo was transformed by the coaching of Amarillo Washington, who used scientific methods to replace the earlier habits of "training hard, but then after matches going to the bar to eat and drink everything." Carrasco's leading player Diego Ormaechea had been introduced to the sport as a fifteen-year-old in 1976 and was still playing for club and country more than twenty years later.

In the 1980s, the Unión de Rugby del Uruguay used the success of coaching at Stella Maris and the British School as a template for spreading the game into other schools.

The year 1989 saw the Unión de Rugby del Uruguay, officially join the International Rugby Board (IRB) this saw increased international competition. The 1990s started off in an optimistic fashion, with three straight defeats of Chile, Brazil and Paraguay. This was followed by more wins over their traditional opponents, though Uruguay still lost to South America's powerhouse Argentina. Uruguay's biggest success was qualifying for the 1999 Rugby World Cup in Wales. Uruguay finished third in their pool, winning one game against a weak Spanish side, which was not good enough to qualify for the knockout stages. Despite this rugby union's profile soared and is considered the third most popular sport, after football and basketball.

In 1993, Carrasco Polo beat a Buenos Aires squad which included 14 Pumas.

Ormaechea, aged 40 years old, was also the oldest player ever at the Rugby World Cup finals, in 1999, being the captain in his country first ever presence at the event. He scored a try in the 27–15 win over Spain. (He had been introduced to rugby as a fifteen-year-old in 1976, and played for over two decades.) In addition, Ormaechea was older than URU president, Andres Sanguinetti.

Uruguay has been visited by at least two French tours – that of 1960, and that of 1985.

Although the number of clubs is relatively small, rugby enjoys great social kudos in Uruguay, with past presidents of the URU including Pedro Bordaberry, a former cabinet minister, as well as Andres Sanguinetti, the half-brother of former national president Julio María Sanguinetti. This has ensured that the game is reasonably well funded.

One of the best known fixtures of Uruguayan rugby is the Punta del Este Sevens, which has attracted many of the world's top sides to one of South America's swankiest beach resorts.

=== 1972 Andes flight disaster ===
The crash of Uruguayan Air Force Flight 571 brought Uruguayan rugby into the global limelight. Members of the amateur Old Christians Club rugby union team from Montevideo, Uruguay, were scheduled to play a match in Santiago, Chile, against the Old Boys Club, an English rugby team. Club president Daniel Juan chartered a Uruguayan Air Force twin turboprop Fairchild FH-227D airplane to fly the team over the Andes mountains to Santiago. The aircraft carried 40 passengers and 5 crew members. The pilot in command, Colonel Julio César Ferradas, was an experienced Air Force pilot with 5,117 hours of flight time. He was accompanied by co-pilot Lieutenant-Colonel Dante Héctor Lagurara. There were extra seats, so the team invited friends and family members to accompany them. The plane crashed in the Andes Mountains due to pilot error. Ultimately 16 passengers survived after being trapped for over two months on the mountain.

During the 1999 Rugby World Cup, the national squad was reported to have been saddened by persistent press questioning about Flight 571, rather than their achievement in reaching it with such a small player base.

== National team ==
The national team, more commonly known as the Los Teros (southern lapwing), represent Uruguay at international level. The team is governed by the Unión de Rugby del Uruguay and are the second highest ranked team in South America after Argentina at 18th in the world. The team plays almost all of its home games at the 14,000-capacity Estadio Charrúa in Montevideo, typically drawing about 11,000 for international fixtures.

Uruguay has made a name for itself as the up-and-coming rugby nation of the Americas. Its wins of 67–3 over Paraguay and 14–6 over Chile in the qualifiers for the 1995 Rugby World Cup ensured that its place as the No. 2 nation in South American rugby was assured. In the same competition, they managed to hold Argentina, the most successful rugby nation of the Americas, to 10–19. This places Uruguay as No. 4 within the Americas a whole, despite its small population and number of players.

== Women's rugby ==
Although Uruguay's women have not yet played test match rugby, they have been playing international sevens rugby since 2004. (Current playing record).

== See also ==
- Uruguay at the Rugby World Cup
- Uruguay national rugby union team
- Unión de Rugby del Uruguay
- Pedro Bordaberry#Rugby
- Sports in Uruguay
