= Uruguay at the Rugby World Cup =

Uruguay has competed in five Rugby World Cup tournaments: 1999, 2003, 2015, 2019, and 2023.

A huge success for them was qualifying for the 1999 Rugby World Cup in Wales. They won their pool fixture against Spain, finishing third in their pool.

They qualified for the World Cup again in 2003, and won their pool fixture against Georgia, 24–12.

Uruguay's qualification for the 2007 World Cup started in Americas Round 3a, where they were pooled with Argentina and Chile. After losing their first match 26 points to nil to Argentina, they defeated Chile 43–15 in Montevideo, which saw them enter Round 4, where they faced the USA. Uruguay lost on aggregate, and moved on to the repechage round as Americas 4. They played Portugal over two legs - losing the first in Lisbon and winning the second in Montevideo. Portugal qualified on aggregate points. They again failed to qualify for the 2011 Rugby World Cup final tournament.

Uruguay qualified for the 2015 Rugby World Cup. They did not win any games during the tournament.

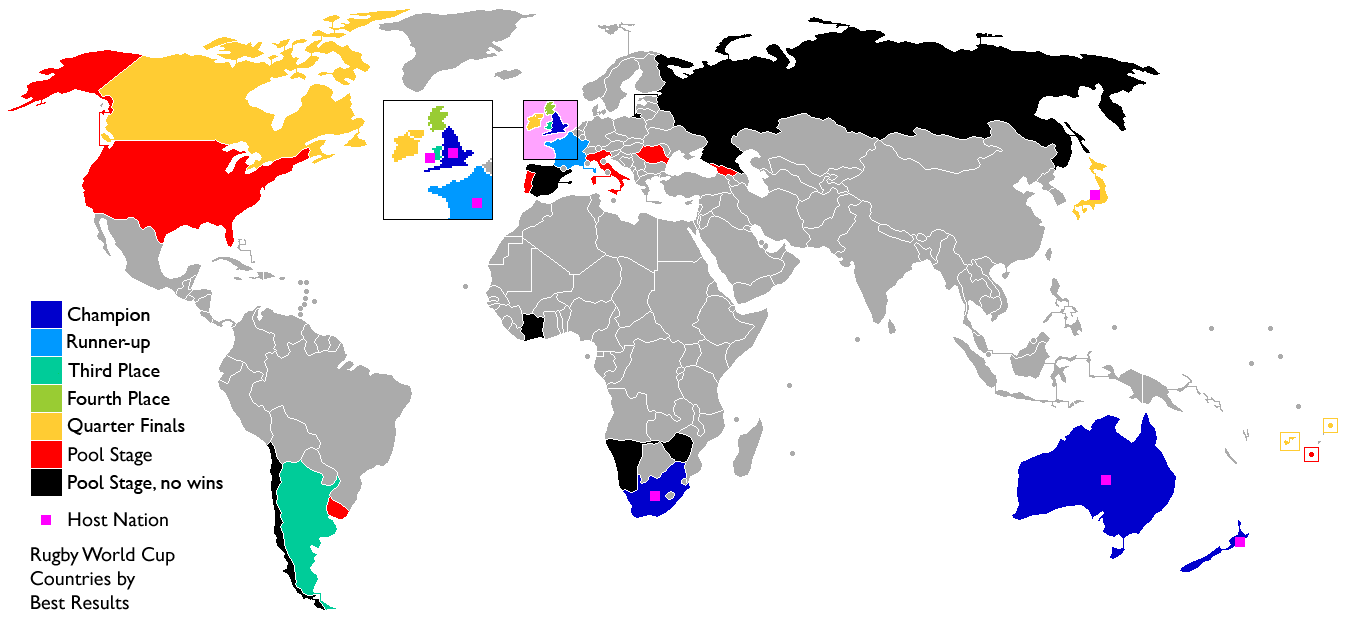
Map of countries' best results

Uruguay qualified for the 2019 Rugby World Cup and won their opening game against Fiji 30–27.

Nation	Number of appearances	First appearance	Most recent appearance	Streak	Best result
Uruguay	5	1999	2023	2	One win (1999, 2003, 2019, 2023)

== By position ==
Rugby World Cup record										Qualification						
Year	Round	Pld	W	D	L	PF	PA	Squad	Head coach	Pos	Pld	W	D	L	PF	PA
(New Zealand) (Australia) 1987	Not invited									Not invited						
(England) (France) (Ireland) (Scotland) (Wales) 1991	Did not enter									Did not enter						
(South Africa) 1995	Did not qualify									2nd	3	2	0	1	91	28
(Wales) 1999	Pool Stage	3	1	0	2	42	97	Squad	D. Herrera	P/O	9	5	0	4	209	188
(Australia) 2003	Pool Stage	4	1	0	3	56	255	Squad	D. Ormaechea	2nd	6	3	0	3	115	144
(France) 2007	Did not qualify									P/O	6	2	0	4	86	140
(New Zealand) 2011	Did not qualify									P/O	7	3	1	3	249	106
(England) 2015	Pool Stage	4	0	0	4	30	226	Squad	P. Lemoine	P/O	9	6	1	2	260	168
(Japan) 2019	Pool Stage	4	1	0	3	60	140	Squad	E. Meneses	P/O	8	8	0	0	318	160
(France) 2023	Pool Stage	4	1	0	3	65	164	Squad	E. Meneses	P/O	4	3	0	1	101	57
(Australia) 2027	To be determined									To be determined						
(United States) 2031	To be determined									To be determined						
Total	—	19	4	0	15	253	882	—	—	—	52	32	2	18	1429	991
Champions; Runners–up; Third place; Fourth place; Home venue

== 1999 Rugby World Cup (Pool A) ==
Team	Pld	W	D	L	PF	PA	PD	Pts
South Africa	3	3	0	0	132	35	+97	9
Scotland	3	2	0	1	120	58	+62	7
Uruguay	3	1	0	2	42	97	−55	5
Spain	3	0	0	3	18	122	−104	3

2 October 1999

Uruguay	27–15	Spain
Try: Ormaechea; Cardoso; Menchaca; Con: Aguirre; Sciarra; Pen: Aguirre		Pen: Kovalenco (5)

Netherdale, Galashiels
Referee: Chris White (England)

8 October 1999

Scotland	43–12	Uruguay
Try: Russell; Armstrong; Metcalfe; Leslie; Simpson; Townsend; Con: Logan (5); Pen: Logan		Pen: Aguirre (3); Sciarra

Murrayfield Stadium, Edinburgh
Referee: Stuart Dickinson (Australia)

15 October 1999

South Africa	39–3	Uruguay
Try: Van den Bergh (2); Van der Westhuizen; Kayser; Fleck; Con: De Beer (4); Pen: De Beer (2)		Pen: Aguirre

Hampden Park, Glasgow
Referee: Peter Marshall (Australia)

== 2003 Rugby World Cup (Pool C) ==
Team	Pld	W	D	L	PF	PA	PD	BP	Pts	Qualification
England	4	4	0	0	255	47	+208	3	19	Quarter-finals
South Africa	4	3	0	1	184	60	+124	3	15	Quarter-finals
Samoa	4	2	0	2	138	117	+21	2	10	
Uruguay	4	1	0	3	56	255	−199	0	4	
Georgia	4	0	0	4	46	200	−154	0	0	

11 October 2003

South Africa	72–6	Uruguay
Try: Van der Westhuizen (3); Van Niekerk; Botha; Delport; Fourie; Bands; Rossouw; Scholtz; Greef; Con: Koen (5); Hougaard		Pen: Aguirre (2)

Subiaco Oval, Perth
Attendance: 16,906
Referee: Paddy O'Brien (New Zealand)

15 October 2003

Samoa	60–13	Uruguay
Try: Fa'asavalu (2); Lima (2); Tagicakibau; Fa'atau; Lemalu; Vili; Fe'aunati; Palepoi; Con: Va'a (3); Vili (2)		Try: Capó; Lemoine; Pen: Aguirre

Subiaco Oval, Perth
Attendance: 22,020
Referee: David McHugh (Ireland)

28 October 2003

Georgia	12–24	Uruguay
Pen: Urjukashvili; Kvirikashvili (3)		Try: Cardoso; Lamelas; Brignoni; Con: Aguirre (2); Menchaca; Pen: Juan Menchaca

Sydney Football Stadium, Sydney
Attendance: 28,576
Referee: Kelvin Deaker (New Zealand)

2 November 2003

England	111–13	Uruguay
Try: Moody; Lewsey (5); Balshaw (2); Catt (2); Gomarsall (2); Luger; Abbott; Robinson (2); Greenwood; Con: Grayson (11); Catt (2)		Try: Lemoine; Con: Menchaca; Pen: Menchaca (2)

Suncorp Stadium, Brisbane
Attendance: 46,233
Referee: Nigel Whitehouse (Wales)

== 2007 Rugby World Cup ==
Did not qualify.

== 2011 Rugby World Cup ==
Did not qualify.

== 2015 Rugby World Cup ==
During 2015 Rugby World Cup qualifying, Uruguay won the 2013 South American Rugby Championship "A", getting wins at the Estadio Charrúa against Brazil (58–7) and Chile (23–9). In March 2014, Uruguay faced the United States in a NACRA-CONSUR playoff for the last Americas qualification spot. Uruguay tied the home leg 27–27, but lost the away leg 32–13. Uruguay then moved to the repechage, where it defeated Hong Kong 28–3 at the Estadio Charrúa, to face Russia for the 20th and final spot at the 2015 Rugby World Cup. Uruguay qualified for the 2015 Rugby World Cup by defeating Russia by an aggregate score of 57–49 in the two-game series, winning the second game at home 36–27 in front of 14,000 fans at the Charrua Stadium.

Uruguay played in Pool A. The pool was composed of hosts England, as well as the third- and fourth-placed teams from 2011, Australia and Wales. They were joined by one qualifier, Fiji. The group has been called the "group of death". Uruguay lost all their pool matches without any bonus points.

20 September 2015
14:30

Wales	54–9	Uruguay
Try: Lee 15' c Allen (3) 19' c, 30' c, 40' c Amos 50' c Davies (2) 60' m, 80' c Tipuric 71' c Con: Priestland (7/8) 16', 19', 30', 40', 51', 72', 80'	Report	Pen: Berchesi (3/4) 2', 9', 24'

Millennium Stadium, Cardiff
Attendance: 71,887
Referee: Romain Poite (France)

27 September 2015
12:00

Australia	65–3	Uruguay
Try: McMahon (2) 7' m, 69' m Tomane 9' c Mumm 26' m Speight 31' c McCalman (2) 36' c, 61' c Mitchell (2) 47' m, 52' m To'omua 71' m Kuridrani 80' c Con: Cooper (5/11) 10', 32', 36', 62', 80'	Report	Pen: Berchesi (1/1) 24'

Villa Park, Birmingham
Attendance: 39,605
Referee: Pascal Gaüzère (France)

6 October 2015
20:00

Fiji	47–15	Uruguay
Try: Penalty try (2) 3' c, 27' c Kenatale 8' m Nakarawa 38' c Cavubati 64' c Murimurivalu 66' c Nadolo 79' c Con: Nadolo (6/7) 3', 28', 39', 65', 66', 80	Report	Try: Arboleya 17' c Ormaechea 58' m Con: Ormaechea (1/2) 18'; Pen: Durán (1/1) 15'

Stadium mk, Milton Keynes
Attendance: 30,048
Referee: JP Doyle (England)

10 October 2015
20:00

England	60–3	Uruguay
Try: Watson (2) 7' c, 42' m Easter (3) 18' c, 23' c, 60' m Slade 54' m Nowell (3) 57' c, 70' m, 74' m Penalty try 80' c Con: Farrell (4/6) 8', 19', 25', 58'; Ford (1/4) 80'	Report	Pen: Berchesi (1/1) 2'

City of Manchester Stadium, Manchester
Attendance: 50,778
Referee: Chris Pollock (New Zealand)

Pos	Team	Pld	W	D	L	PF	PA	PD	T	B	Pts	Qualification
1	Australia	4	4	0	0	141	35	+106	17	1	17	Advanced to the quarter-finals and qualified for the 2019 Rugby World Cup
2	Wales	4	3	0	1	111	62	+49	11	1	13	Advanced to the quarter-finals and qualified for the 2019 Rugby World Cup
3	England	4	2	0	2	133	75	+58	16	3	11	Eliminated but qualified for 2019 Rugby World Cup
4	Fiji	4	1	0	3	84	101	−17	10	1	5	
5	Uruguay	4	0	0	4	30	226	−196	2	0	0	

== 2019 Rugby World Cup ==
Uruguay qualified by beating Canada over two legs. Uruguay play in Pool D. They are joined by Australia, Wales, Georgia and Fiji. Uruguay won their first match of the pool, which was 30–27 against Fiji.

Pos	Team	Pld	W	D	L	PF	PA	PD	T	B	Pts	Qualification
1	Wales	4	4	0	0	136	69	+67	17	3	19	Advanced to the quarter-finals and qualified for the 2023 Rugby World Cup
2	Australia	4	3	0	1	136	68	+68	20	4	16	Advanced to the quarter-finals and qualified for the 2023 Rugby World Cup
3	Fiji	4	1	0	3	110	108	+2	17	3	7	Eliminated but qualified for 2023 Rugby World Cup
4	Georgia	4	1	0	3	65	122	−57	9	1	5	
5	Uruguay	4	1	0	3	60	140	−80	6	0	4	

25 September 2019
14:15 JST (UTC+09)

(2 BP) Fiji	27–30	Uruguay
Try: Dolokoto 8' m Mawi 19' c Ratuniyarawa 48' m Matawalu (2) 67' m, 80+1' m Con: J. Matavesi (1/3) 20'	Report	Try: Arata 14' c Diana 22' c Cat 26' c Con: Berchesi (3/3) 15', 23', 28'; Pen: Berchesi (3/4) 38', 61', 76'

Kamaishi Recovery Memorial Stadium, Kamaishi
Attendance: 14,025
Referee: Pascal Gaüzère (France)

29 September 2019
14:15 JST (UTC+09)

(1 BP) Georgia	33–7	Uruguay
Try: Todua 9' m Giorgadze 30' c Chilachava 43' c Bregvadze 52' c Kveseladze 58' c Con: Abzhandadze (4/5) 30', 44', 53', 59'	Report	Try: Vilaseca 33' c Con: Berchesi (1/1) 34'

Kumagaya Rugby Stadium, Kumagaya
Attendance: 24,895
Referee: Wayne Barnes (England)

5 October 2019
14:15 JST (UTC+09)

(1 BP) Australia	45–10	Uruguay
Try: Haylett-Petty (2) 6' c, 68' m Petaia 24' c Kuridrani (2) 31' m, 46' c Genia 53' c Slipper 61' c Con: Lealiifano (5/7) 7', 25', 48', 55', 63'	Report	Try: Diana 79' c Con: Berchesi (1/1) 79'; Pen: Berchesi (1/1) 13'

Oita Stadium, Ōita
Attendance: 33,781
Referee: Mathieu Raynal (France)

13 October 2019
17:15 JST (UTC+09)

(1 BP) Wales	35–13	Uruguay
Try: Smith 17' c Adams 49' c Penalty try 66'; T. Williams 74' c G. Davies 80+5' c Con: Halfpenny (4/4) 18', 50', 75', 80+6'	Report	Try: Kessler 71' c Con: Berchesi (1/1) 72'; Pen: Berchesi (2/2) 22', 39'

Kumamoto Stadium, Kumamoto
Attendance: 27,317
Referee: Angus Gardner (Australia)

== 2023 Rugby World Cup ==
Pos	Team	Pld	W	D	L	PF	PA	PD	TF	TA	B	Pts	Qualification
1	France (H)	4	4	0	0	210	32	+178	27	5	2	18	Advance to knockout stage, and qualification to the 2027 Men's Rugby World Cup
2	New Zealand	4	3	0	1	253	47	+206	38	4	3	15	Advance to knockout stage, and qualification to the 2027 Men's Rugby World Cup
3	Italy	4	2	0	2	114	181	−67	15	25	2	10	Qualification to the 2027 Men's Rugby World Cup
4	Uruguay	4	1	0	3	65	164	−99	9	21	1	5	
5	Namibia	4	0	0	4	37	255	−218	3	37	0	0	

Source: World Rugby
Rules for classification: Pool stage tiebreakers
(H) Host

14 September 2023
21:00 CEST (UTC+2)

France	27–12	Uruguay
Try: Hastoy 10' c Mauvaka 55' c Bielle-Biarrey 74' c Con: Jaminet (3/3) 11', 56', 75'; Pen: Jaminet (2/3) 3', 14'	Report	Try: Freitas 6' m Amaya 53' c Con: Etcheverry (1/2) 54'

Stade Pierre-Mauroy, Villeneuve-d'Ascq
Attendance: 48,821
Referee: Ben O'Keeffe (New Zealand)

20 September 2023
17:45 CEST (UTC+2)

(1 BP) Italy	38–17	Uruguay
Try: Pani 7' c Lamaro 46' c Ioane 52' c L. Cannone 56' c Brex 61' c Con: Allan (5/5) 8', 47', 53', 57', 62'; Pen: P. Garbisi (1/1) 70'	Report	Try: Penalty try 27'; Freitas 37' c Con: Etcheverry (1/1) 38'; Drop: Etcheverry (1/1) 42'

Stade de Nice, Nice
Attendance: 28,627
Referee: Angus Gardner (Australia)

27 September 2023
17:45 CEST (UTC+2)

(1 BP) Uruguay	36–26	Namibia
Try: Amaya (2) 19' m, 49' c Kessler 28' c Arata 54' c Basso 66' c Con: Etcheverry (3/4) 29', 51', 55'; Berchesi (1/1) 67'; Pen: Berchesi (1/1) 74'	Report	Try: Mouton 1' c Greyling 11' c Con: Swanepoel (2/2) 2', 12'; Pen: Swanepoel (4/4) 25', 35', 43', 69'

Parc Olympique Lyonnais, Décines-Charpieu
Attendance: 49,342
Referee: Mathieu Raynal (France)

5 October 2023
21:00 CEST (UTC+2)

(1 BP) New Zealand	73–0	Uruguay
Try: McKenzie (2) 20' c, 53' c Mo'unga 25' c Jordan (2) 33' c, 65' c Roigard 38' m Newell 45' m Fainga'anuku (3) 49' c, 68' c, 77' c Williams 73' c Con: Mo'unga (5/7) 21', 26', 34', 50', 54'; McKenzie (2/2) 66', 69'; B. Barrett (2/2) 74', 78'	Report

Parc Olympique Lyonnais, Décines-Charpieu
Attendance: 57,672
Referee: Wayne Barnes (England)

== Overall record ==
Uruguay vs	Played	Win	Draw	Lost	Win %
Australia	2	0	0	2	0%
England	2	0	0	2	0%
Fiji	2	1	0	1	50%
France	1	0	0	1	0%
Georgia	2	1	0	1	50%
Italy	1	0	0	1	0%
Namibia	1	1	0	0	100%
New Zealand	1	0	0	1	0%
Samoa	1	0	0	1	0%
Scotland	1	0	0	1	0%
Spain	1	1	0	0	100%
South Africa	2	0	0	2	0%
Wales	2	0	0	2	0%
Overall	19	4	0	15	21.05%

== Team records ==
Most points in a tournament

- 65 (2023 in France)
- 60 (2019 in Japan)
- 56 (2003 in Australia)

Most points in a game

- 36 vs Namibia (2023)
- 30 vs Fiji (2019)
- 27 vs Spain (1999)

Biggest winning margin

- 12 vs Spain (1999)
- 12 Vs Georgia (2003)
- 10 vs Namibia (2023)

Highest score against

- 111 vs England (2003)
- 73 vs New Zealand (2023)
- 72 vs South Africa (2003)

Biggest losing margin

- 98 vs England (2003)
- 73 vs New Zealand (2023)
- 66 vs South Africa (2003)

Most tries in a tournament

- 9 (2023 in France)
- 6 (2019 in Japan)
- 6 (2003 in Australia)

Most tries in a game

- 5 vs Namibia (2023)
- 3 vs Spain (1999)
- 3 vs Georgia (2003)
- 3 vs Fiji (2019)

== Individual records ==
Most appearances

- 12 Agustín Ormaechea (England 2015, Japan 2019, France 2023)
- 12 Andrés Vilaseca (England 2015, Japan 2019, France 2023)
- 11 Felipe Berchesi (England 2015, Japan 2019, France 2023)
- 11 Mateo Sanguinetti (England 2015, Japan 2019, France 2023)
- 10 German Kessler (England 2015, Japan 2019, France 2023)

Most appearances as Captain

- 5 Andrés Vilaseca (Japan 2019, France 2023)
- 4 Diego Aguirre (Australia 2003)
- 4 Santiago Vilaseca (England 2015)

Most points overall

- 55 Felipe Berchesi (England 2015,Japan 2019, France 2023)
- 30 Diego Aguirre (Wales 1999, Australia 2003)
- 18 Juan Menchaca (Wales 1999, Australia 2003)
- 15 Baltazar Amaya (France 2023)
- 13 Felipe Etcheverry (Japan 2019, France 2023)

Most points in a game

- 15 vs Fiji - Felipe Berchesi (Japan 2019)
- 10 vs Namibia - Baltazar Amaya (France 2023)
- 9 vs Scotland - Diego Aguirre (Wales 1999)
- 9 vs Wales - Felipe Berchesi (England 2015)
- 8 vs England - Juan Menchaca (Australia 2003)
- 8 vs Wales - Felipe Berchesi (Japan 2019)

Most tries overall

- 3 Baltazar Amaya (France 2023)
- 2 Pablo Lemoine (Wales 1999, Australia 2003)
- 2 Alfonso Cardoso (Wales 1999, Australia 2003)
- 2 Santiago Arata (Japan 2019, France 2023)
- 2 Manuel Diana (Japan 2019, France 2023)
- 2 Nicolas Freitas (Japan 2019, France 2023)
- 2 German Kessler (Japan 2019, France 2023)

Most penalty goals

- 12 Felipe Berchesi (England 2015,Japan 2019, France 2023)
- 8 Diego Aguirre (Wales 1999, Australia 2003)
- 3 Juan Menchaca (Wales 1999, Australia 2003)
