= MVCC =

MVCC may refer to:

- Mohawk Valley Community College, Rome and Utica, New York, United States
- Montevideo Cricket Club, a multisport club in Uruguay
- Moonee Valley City Council, a local government area in Melbourne, Victoria, Australia
- Moraine Valley Community College, Palos Hills, Illinois, United States
- Multiversion concurrency control, a database feature
