= Club de Golf del Uruguay =

Coordinates: 34.9236°S 56.1661°W

Club de Golf
- Full name: Club de Golf del Uruguay
- Founded: 1922; 103 years ago
- Ground: Blvr. Artigas 379
- Location: Punta Carretas, Montevideo, Uruguay
- League(s): Campeonato Uruguayo (Rugby)
- Affiliations: Uruguayan Golf Association; Uruguayan Rugby Union
- Activities: List: basketball; field hockey; football; karate; pilates; rugby union; swimming; tennis; volleyball; yoga
- President: Santiago Fernández Secco
- Colors
- Website: cgu.com.uy

Club de Golf del Uruguay is an Uruguayan sports and social club from the city of Montevideo. Although golf is the main sport of the institution, the club hosts a large variety of sports such as basketball, field hockey, football, karate, pilates, rugby union, swimming, tennis, volleyball, and yoga, apart from other social activities.

The club was originally established as "Uruguay Golf Club", being its president Haroldo Capurro. In 1922 the club affiliated to Uruguayan Golf Association. The Golf Club also entrusted the association its courses to be built in Punta Carretas with the purpose of encouraging tourism at the region.

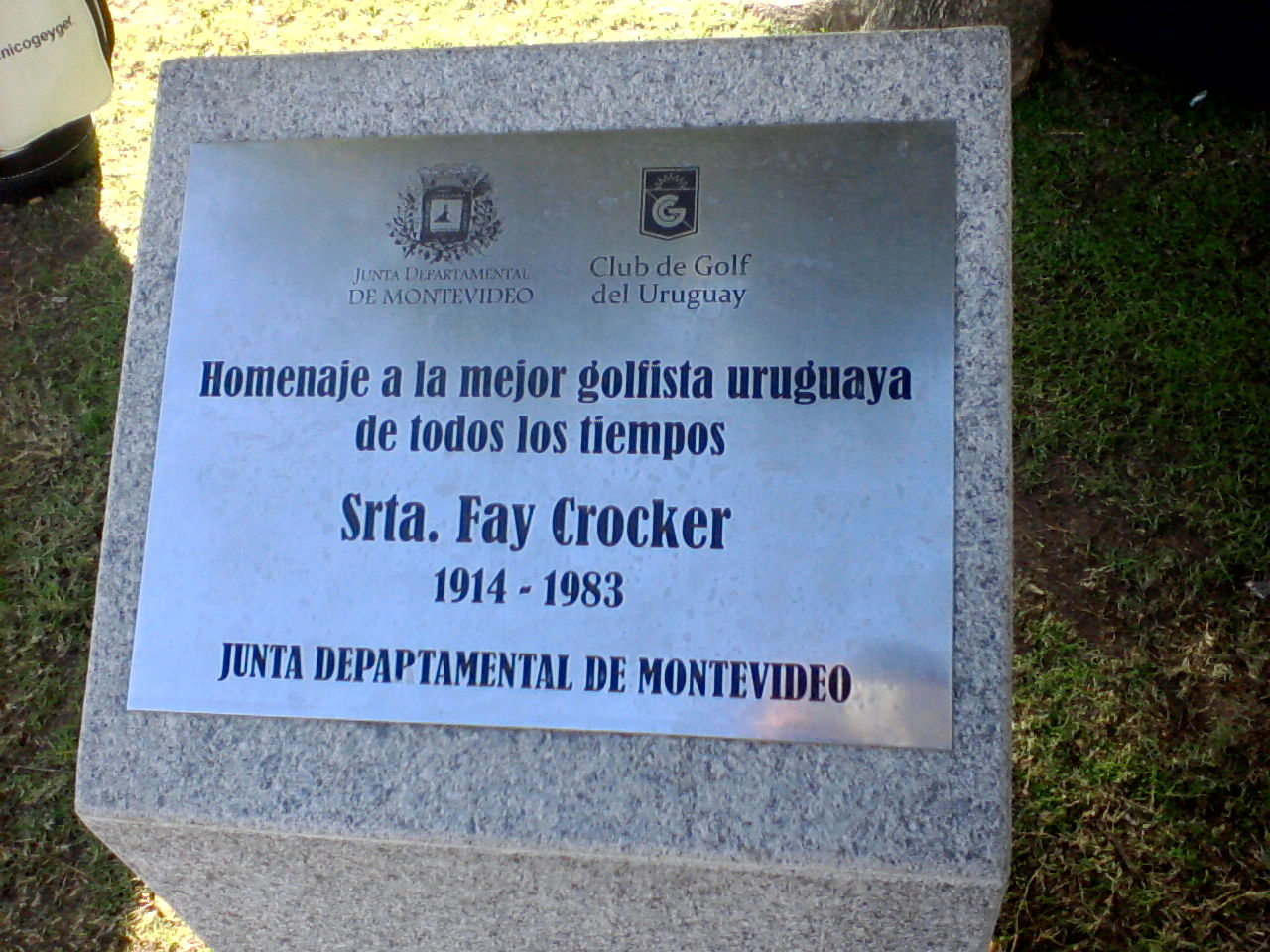
Plaque honoring Fay Crocker with the legend "The best Uruguayan golfer of all time".

The golf course is located on the Rambla of Montevideo that runs alongside the Río de la Plata. It was designed by Alister MacKenzie and has 18 holes and 6,635 yards. It is officially known as the Parque de las Instrucciones del Año XIII, and is open to public on Sunday afternoons, except in winter and during international tournaments. In 1975 it was declared an historical national monument.

The course was inaugurated on May 25, 1934 before starting the 2nd edition of Torneo Abierto de Montevideo. It held the Copa Los Andes, among other South American championship. In 2013 and 2014, the Roberto De Vicenzo Invitational Copa NEC, a professional tournament on PGA Tour Latinoamérica, was played at Club de Golf. The club also has an own publication, Golf Magazine that covers all the social and sports activities and corporate events organized by Club de Golf.

The rugby union team of the club, nicknamed "Los Cuervos" (The Crows) due to its black uniform, was formed in 1959 and currently competes in Campeonato Uruguayo, the first division of Uruguayan rugby system.

In 2018, a field hockey section (also with black kit and nicknamed Cuervos like the rugby team) was added to the club.

== Uniforms ==
Rugby union	Football

== Titles ==
Rugby union

- Campeonato Uruguayo (1): 1960
