= Mario Lamé =

Uruguay international rugby union player

- Born: 30 January 1966 (age 60) Montevideo, Uruguay
- Height: 6 ft 3 in (191 cm)
- Weight: 244 lb (111 kg)

Rugby union career
- Position: Lock
International career
Years	Team	Apps	(Points)
1987–01	Uruguay	52	(15)

Mario Lamé (born 30 January 1966) is a Uruguayan rugby union coach and former player.

A lock from Montevideo, Lamé played his rugby for the powerful Carrasco Polo Club.

Lamé competed on the Uruguay national team from 1987 to 2001, earning 52 caps. He was a member of the side that travelled to Scotland for the 1999 Rugby World Cup and featured in all three pool matches.

In 2017, Lamé was appointed head coach of the Uruguay under-20s.

== See also ==
- List of Uruguay national rugby union players
