= Martín Panizza =

Uruguay international rugby union player

- Born: 24 July 1970 (age 56) Montevideo, Uruguay
- Height: 6 ft 2 in (188 cm)
- Weight: 218 lb (99 kg)

Rugby union career
- Position: Flanker
International career
| Years | Team | Apps | (Points) |
| 1990–99 | Uruguay | 42 | (0) |

Martín Panizza (born 24 July 1970) is a Uruguayan former international rugby union player.

Born in Montevideo, Panizza was a flanker and spent most of his career with the Carrasco Polo Club.

Panizza was capped 42 times for Uruguay during the 1990s, bowing out of international rugby at the 1999 Rugby World Cup, where he featured in all three pool matches. His final appearance was against South Africa and he was the player kicked in the head by Brendan Venter, which resulted in the Springbok being suspended for the rest of the tournament.

== See also ==
- List of Uruguay national rugby union players
