= Old Boys & Old Girls Club =

Sports club

Old Boys
- Full name: The British Schools Old Boys & Old Girls Club
- Union: URU
- Nickname: "Cotorras"
- Founded: 19 april 1914; 112 years ago
- Location: Montevideo, Uruguay
- Ground: Máximo Tajes 6389-99
- President: Felip Cat
- League: Campeonato Uruguayo
- 2025: 1st (winner)
Team kit

Official website
- www.obcyogc.com

Old Boys & Old Girls Club, simply known as Old Boys, or the "cotorras" is a Uruguayan sports club from the Carrasco neighbourhood of Montevideo. The club was founded by alumni of the city's British Schools.

Mainly known for its rugby union team, other sports practised at the club include boxing, basketball, field hockey, football, gymnastics, squash and tennis.

== History ==
The British Schools of Montevideo were founded in 1908. Six years later, the school's first alumni decided to create a social and sport club: The Old Boys Club. Female alumni followed suit some years later and founded the Old Girls Club in 1937.

After a friendly rugby union game against former players of the British y Montevideo CC in 1948, Old Boys decided to start a rugby section. Only two years later, Old Boys won the first ever national title in 1950.

Rugby would quickly become the club's main sport and the sport for which the club is mostly known today. The club is the second most successful (behind Old Christians) in Uruguay, having won the Campeonato Uruguayo 17 times.

Old Boys' main rival is Old Christians.

== Notable all-time rugby players ==
- Juan Campomar
- Alfonso Cardoso
- Alejo Corral
- Joaquin Pastore
- José Malet
- Santiago Vilaseca
- Andrés Vilaseca
- Juan Manuel Gaminara
- Manuel Leindekar
- Santiago Civetta
- Carlos Deus
- Felipe Arcos Pérez
- Baltazar Amaya
- Bautista Basso
- Juan Manuel Cat

== Titles ==
=== Rugby union ===
- Campeonato Uruguayo (17):

1950, 1952, 1956, 1957, 1959, 1962, 1963, 1964, 1965, 1967, 1968, 1969, 1975, 2010, 2013, 2021, 2025
