= Old Christians Club =

Uruguayan sports club (Rugby, Football & Hockey) club, based in Montevideo

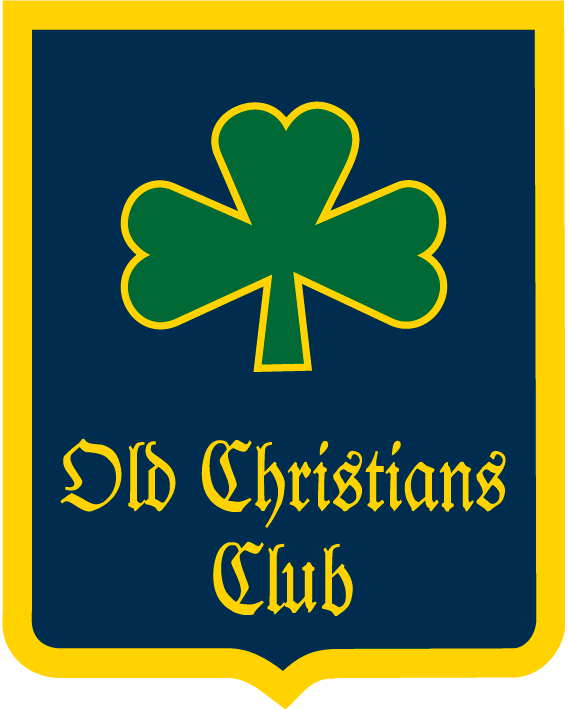
- Full name: Old Christians Club
- Union: Unión de Rugby del Uruguay
- Founded: 1962; 63 years ago
- Location: Montevideo, Uruguay
- Ground: San Patricio
- President: Julio Cesar Lestido
- League: Primera División
Team kit

Official website
- oldchristians.org

Old Christians Club, or simply Old Christians, is a Uruguayan sports club from the Carrasco neighbourhood of Montevideo.

The club is known mostly for its rugby union team that became famous around the world due to the 1972 Uruguayan Air Force Flight 571 crash that involved the first division team of the club. Old Christians currently plays in Primera División, the top division of local rugby system.

Apart from rugby union, the club also hosts football and field hockey branches.

== History ==
Old Christians Club was founded in 1962 by alumni of the Christian Brothers, Stella Maris College, one of Montevideo's best high schools.

The institution started as a rugby union club and, like most rugby clubs in Uruguay and Argentina, also developed a field hockey section for girls, thus becoming a multi-sports club.

=== Flight 571 disaster ===
On October 13, 1972, a plane carrying five crew members and 40 players and associates of Old Christians' rugby team crashed in the remote Andes, en route to Chile. Nine passengers and three crew members died in or shortly after the crash, and five more quickly succumbed to cold and injury. Of the 28 onboard who were alive a few days after the accident, another eight were killed by an avalanche that swept over their shelter in the wreckage.

The survivors had little food and no source of heat in the harsh climate, at over 3,600 metres (11,800 ft) altitude. Faced with starvation and radio news that the search for them had been abandoned in the second week, the survivors fed on the dead who had been preserved in the snow. Rescuers did not learn of the survivors until 10 weeks after the crash, when passengers Nando Parrado and Roberto Canessa, after a 10-day trek across the Andes, found a Chilean huaso who gave them food and then alerted authorities about the existence of 16 survivors. From 19 team members on the flight, seven of the rugby players survived the ordeal; 11 players and the team physician died.

The story of the disaster has since been depicted in many movies, television shows and books.

== Achievements in rugby ==
Despite being one of Montevideo's youngest clubs, Old Christians have achieved remarkable success on the national scene, winning their first national title only six years after the club's creation.

Since then the club has become a powerhouse of Uruguayan rugby, winning the Campeonato Uruguayo de Rugby 20 times, the most recent one in 2023.

Many Old Christians have also gone on to represent Uruguay at international level.

The club's main rivals are Carrasco Polo Club and Old Boys Club.

== Honours ==
- Campeonato Uruguayo de Rugby
  - Winners (20): 1968, 1970, 1973, 1976, 1977, 1978, 1979, 1980, 1982, 1984, 1985, 1986, 1987, 1988, 1989, 2007, 2015, 2016, 2017, 2019
- Campeonato Liga Universitaria de fútbol +40
  - Winners (2): 2020, 2021
