= Campeonato Uruguayo de Rugby =

Rugby competition in Uruguay

Campeonato Uruguayo
- Sport: Rugby union
- Inaugural season: 1950; 76 years ago
- Number of teams: 12
- Region: Uruguay (URU)
- Current champion: Old Boys Club (2025)
- Most titles: Carrasco Polo (28 titles)
- Website: uru.org.uy/primera
- Broadcast partner: ESPN

The Campeonato Uruguayo de Rugby, also known as Uruguayo de Rugby, is the main competition of Uruguayan rugby union league system. It includes the first, second and third division competitions. It was played for the first time in 1950.

== History ==
Rugby was introduced to Uruguay as early as the late 19th century, but did not really take off in formal terms until the mid-20th. The spur for this was Carlos E. Cat, who helped establish the Club Championship in 1950, and would become the first president of the URU in January 1951. The first Club Championship was contested by Old Boys, Colonia Rugby, and multisport clubs such as Montevideo Cricket Club (MVCC) and Carrasco Polo (which supplied two XVs). This was successful enough to lead to the establishment of the Uruguayan Rugby Union on 31 January 1951, with Cat as president.

Over the years, various other clubs would join the Championship, including Los Cuervos (the Crows) at the end of the 1950s, Old Christians at the beginning of the 1960s, as well as Champagnat and El Trébol de Paysandú in the 1970s, and Pucaru in the early 1990s, as well as La Cachila, Trouville, and Colonia Rowing.

== Current teams ==
There are 12 clubs participating in the 2025 championship:

Club	City	Estab.
Carrasco Polo	Montevideo	1933
Ceibos	Montevideo	2014
Champagnat	Montevideo	1975
Círculo de Tenis	Montevideo	1915
Los Cuervos (Note: name of Club de Golf del Uruguay rugby team.)	Montevideo	1959
Lobos	Punta del Este	1994
Montevideo Cricket	Montevideo	1861
Old Boys	Montevideo	1914
Old Christians	Montevideo	1962
Pucaru Stade Gaulois (Note: Mostly known as "PSG".)	Montevideo	2005
Seminario	Montevideo	2010
Trébol (Note: Rugby team of Paysandú Golf Club.)	Paysandú	1927

== Champions ==
Ed.	Year	Club
1	1950	Old Boys (1)
2	1951	Montevideo Cricket (1)
3	1952	Old Boys (2) / Carrasco Polo (1)
4	1953	Montevideo Cricket (2)
5	1954	Trouville (1)
6	1955	Colonia Rowing (1)
7	1956	Montevideo Cricket (3) / Old Boys (3) / Trouville (2)
8	1957	Old Boys (4)
9	1958	Colonia Rowing (2) / Trouville (3)
10	1959	Old Boys (5)
11	1960	Los Cuervos
12	1961	Carrasco Polo (2)
13	1962	Old Boys (6)
14	1963	Old Boys (7)
15	1964	Old Boys (8)
16	1965	Old Boys (9)
17	1966	Carrasco Polo (3)
18	1967	Old Boys (10)
19	1968	Old Christians (1) / Old Boys (11)
20	1969	Old Boys (12)
21	1970	Old Christians (2)
22	1971	La Cachila (1)
23	1972	La Cachila (2)
24	1973	Old Christians (3) / La Cachila (3)
25	1974	La Cachila (4)
26	1975	La Cachila (5) / Old Boys (13)
27	1976	Old Christians (4)
28	1977	Old Christians (5)
29	1978	Old Christians (6)
30	1979	Old Christians (7)
31	1980	Old Christians (8)
32	1981	Carrasco Polo (4)
33	1982	Old Christians (9)
34	1983	Carrasco Polo (5)
35	1984	Old Christians (10)
36	1985	Old Christians (11)
37	1986	Old Christians (12)
38	1987	Old Christians (13)
39	1988	Old Christians (14)
40	1989	Old Christians (15)
41	1990	Carrasco Polo (6)
42	1991	Carrasco Polo (7)
43	1992	Carrasco Polo (8)
44	1993	Carrasco Polo (9)
45	1994	Carrasco Polo (10)
46	1995	Carrasco Polo (11)
47	1996	Carrasco Polo (12)
48	1997	Carrasco Polo (13)
49	1998	Carrasco Polo (14)
50	1999	Carrasco Polo (15)
51	2000	Carrasco Polo (16)
52	2001	Carrasco Polo (17)
53	2002	Carrasco Polo (18)
54	2003	Carrasco Polo (19)
55	2004	Carrasco Polo (20)
56	2005	Carrasco Polo (21)
57	2006	Carrasco Polo (22)
58	2007	Old Christians (16)
59	2008	Carrasco Polo (23)
60	2009	Carrasco Polo (24)
61	2010	Old Boys (14)
62	2011	Carrasco Polo (25)
63	2012	Carrasco Polo (26)
64	2013	Old Boys (15)
65	2014	Carrasco Polo (27)
66	2015	Old Christians (17)
67	2016	Old Christians (18)
68	2017	Old Christians (19)
69	2018	Trébol (1)
70	2019	Old Christians (20)
71	2020	Carrasco Polo (28)
72	2021	Old Boys (16)
73	2022	Trébol (2)
73	2023	Old Christians (21)
73	2022	Old Christians (22)
73	2025	Old Boys (17)

== Titles by club ==
Club	Titles	Titles won
Carrasco Polo	28	1952, 1961, 1966, 1981, 1983, 1990, 1991, 1992, 1993, 1994, 1995, 1996, 1997, 1998, 1999, 2000, 2001, 2002, 2003, 2004, 2005, 2006, 2008, 2009, 2011, 2012, 2014, 2020
Old Christians	22	1968, 1970, 1973, 1976, 1977, 1978, 1979, 1980, 1982, 1984, 1985, 1986, 1987, 1988, 1989, 2007, 2015, 2016, 2017, 2019, 2023, 2024
Old Boys	17	1950, 1952, 1956, 1957, 1959, 1962, 1963, 1964, 1965, 1967, 1968, 1969, 1975, 2010, 2013, 2021, 2025
La Cachila	5	1971, 1972, 1973, 1974, 1975
Montevideo Cricket	3	1951, 1953, 1956
Trouville	3	1954, 1956, 1958
Trébol	2	2018, 2022
Colonia Rowing	2	1955, 1958
Los Cuervos	1	1960

== Bibliography ==
- Richards, Huw A Game for Hooligans: The History of Rugby Union (Mainstream Publishing, Edinburgh, 2007, ISBN 978-1-84596-255-5)
