= Daniel Herrera (rugby union) =

Uruguayan rugby union coach (born 1963)

Daniel Herrera Vidiella (born 1963) is a Uruguayan rugby union coach.

He was in charge of Uruguay, from 1994 to 1999, when he achieved his country's first ever qualification for the Rugby World Cup, after defeating Portugal twice in the repechage. In the 1999 Rugby World Cup, he achieved a win over Spain (27–15). Herrera was one of the youngest coaches at the tournament and was even younger than his oldest player, Diego Ormaechea, aged 40.
