= Montevideo Cricket Club =

(Uruguay) Montevideo Cricket Club
- Full name: Montevideo Cricket Club
- Union: Unión de Rugby del Uruguay
- Founded: 18 July 1861; 165 years ago
- Location: Montevideo, Uruguay
- Ground: Solymar
- President: Fabian Sfeir
- League: Campeonato Uruguayo
Team kit

Official website
- mvcc.com.uy

Montevideo Cricket Club (abbreviated "MVCC") is a Uruguayan sports club based in Montevideo, established in 1861 by English immigrants. Its predecessor had been the now defunct "Victoria Cricket Club", founded in 1842.

Montevideo has been ranked as the 8th oldest rugby union club (and the first outside Europe) by the World Rugby Museum of Twickenham. Apart from football and rugby, the other sports currently practised at the club are field hockey, and tennis.

As of 2017, the club had 500 members and 400 athletes competing in several sports.

== History ==
A predecessor to MVCC, "Victoria Cricket Club" had been founded by British immigrants led by Samuel Lafone in 1842, with the purpose of playing Cricket. Nevertheless, it is believed that the club was dissolved soon after as there were no further records of its activities. The Great Siege of Montevideo in 1843 also interrupted all sports activities in the city.

The same group of English people would establish MVCC on 18 July 1861 at "Confitería Oriental", where the high society and businessmen of Montevideo used to meet. The first playing field was located on a land where Military Hospital stands nowadays. The club is recognised as the oldest sports club of Uruguay, having been the pioneer in the practise of cricket, field hockey, football, rugby union, and tennis. Moreover, MVCC is regarded as the oldest sports club in South America. The coming of further British companies to Montevideo (such as water suppliers, railways, and banks) helped increase the number of members of the MVCC.

In 1868, the MVCC played its first international cricket game against Argentine Buenos Aires Cricket Club. It is the oldest international match registered in South America and was played on MVCC's ground known as La Blanqueda. MVCC played its first international rugby match against Argentine side Buenos Aires Football Club (another pioneer club regarded as the first institution to play any form of football in South America). The match was held in Montevideo.

The MVCC played its first football match in 1878, against the crew of a ship visiting Montevideo. This was the first organised match in Uruguay. In 1881, the MVCC played its first club match against the Montevideo Rowing Club. MVCC also took part of the first international match involving an Uruguayan football squad, when faced the "Buenos Aires Team" at Montevideo in 1889.

When the Uruguayan Football Association (AUF) was established in 1900, MVCC was one of the clubs invited to join but they refused so they did not want the club to be ruled by a non-British body.

In 1983, the MVCC first played the Club Universitario de Buenos Aires (C.U.B.A.), and has played them annually ever since.

In 1974 and 1975, the MVCC swimming teams won the summer championships in swimming and diving.

The ladies' field hockey team won the local championships in 1987, 1989, 1993 and 1997, and men's team won its first championship in 2000. The club also competes in athletics, cycling, and tennis.

== Rugby ==
English cricket clubs were the incubators of rugby in South America, although rugby has survived much better in these countries than cricket has. It has been claimed that MVCC played rugby football as early as 1865, but the first certain match was between Uruguayans and British members of the MVCC in 1880. One observer, apparently disdainful of the Britons mixing with the "natives", found it:

"...at the same time sublime and ridiculous... [that the] young sons of distinguished families practising the games of the Anglo-Saxon in their youth and young Englishmen of blond Albion, face to face ... and on all sides [were] people strangely dressed who ran and shouted, pushed, fell, rose and finished by joining to form now a circle, now a pyramid, now a compact mass in which one could only distinguish heads without shoulders, legs without bodies and hands without arms."

Carlos E. Cat, also known as "Charlie", was a member of the MVCC, and was also president of the club in 1946.

In 1950, the Campeonato Uruguayo de Rugby was inaugurated and continues today. The first game was between the MVCC, and Carrasco Polo Club.

MVCC had some success in the 1950s, winning the national title three times. In recent years however, the club has had to live in the shadows of Montevideo's two powerhouses: Carrasco Polo Club and Old Christians Club.

== Grounds ==
Since its establishment in 1861, MVCC has had five different grounds. Its original ground was known as "La Blanqueada" or the "English ground", but in 1889, it moved from its original location to make way for a military hospital to a new site nearby. This was also known as "La Blanqueada" or the "New Ground" to distinguish it from the original site. The new site was purchased by debentures that members bought.

The MVCC moved a third time in 1945 to near the town of Sayago. It moved for a fourth time to Carrasco, in 1955, where fields were shared by The British Schools of Montevideo.

In 1996, the MVCC moved yet again to Solymar on the outskirts of Montevideo.

== Origins of CURCC ==
The Central Uruguay Railway Cricket Club (CURCC), predecessor to club Peñarol, was established in 1891 by members of MVCC in disagreement with the club's rules that did not allowed native Uruguayans to be members of MVCC. Apart from that reason, the foundation of a new club reflected the need of those English immigrants to have another institution that competed in cricket.

British newspapers of South America celebrated the creation of CURCC, stating that "The MVVC have long felt the lack of a local rival club against which to measure their strength." The sixteen founders of CURCC were hierarchical employees of the Central Uruguay Railway, the main railway company in the country.

== Honours ==
=== Rugby union ===
- Campeonato Uruguayo (3)

1951, 1953, 1956

== Bibliography ==
- Richards, Huw A Game for Hooligans: The History of Rugby Union (Mainstream Publishing, Edinburgh, 2007, ISBN 978-1-84596-255-5)
- The Development of Rugby in the River Plate Region: Irish Influences by Hugh FitzGerald Ryan in "Irish Migration Studies in Latin America", Society of Irish Latin American Studies.
