= The British Schools of Montevideo =

Location
- 38 - Máximo Tajes 6421 - Montevideo - Uruguay; Montevideo; Uruguay; 34.8765°S 56.0720°W

Information
- Type: Private, laic, bilingual
- Motto: "Perfice"
- Established: 1908
- Campus: Carrasco
- Color: Green
- Website: british.edu.uy

The British Schools of Montevideo is a private, coeducational, non-profit school, founded in 1908 and based in the capital of Uruguay. It offers a bilingual education, combining the Uruguayan national curriculum with an English-language program.

== Educational programs and governance ==
The school offers English and international examinations, such as the IGCSE and International Baccalaureate.

The British Schools was among the first cohort of international schools to introduce the International Baccalaureate (IB) in the late 1960s, being one of the initial pilot schools seating candidates in the first examinations in May 1971.

The school is governed by a Board of Governors, elected by the British Schools Society in Uruguay, whose honorary ex-officio President is the British Ambassador to Uruguay.

== History ==
The School was founded by Jose Maria Guerra Bergman on 8 October 1908 to satisfy demand from the British community in Uruguay. The first classes began in February 1909 at a building located in Juan Blanes Street in downtown Montevideo. Initially there were separate schools for boys and girls, which is why, despite being co-educational since the mid 1930s, the school's name recalls its roots with the word Schools. The schools relocated to Pocitos in 1917 and finished new premises in 1926, with the main building dedicated by President José Serrato at the official opening. Ten years later the boys and girls schools were merged. In 1958 the senior school moved to a purpose built campus in Carrasco, and was joined by the junior school in 1965.

Today, though the bulk of students do not have a personal connection to the United Kingdom, a few are still descended from British families. The British schools was the first school to play rugby union in Uruguay, and its alumni club, Old Boys & Old Girls Club, gives the national rugby squad a number of important players.

=== Prominent alumni ===
Prominent alumni include the former president of Uruguay, Luis Alberto Lacalle Pou, current finance minister Azucena Arbeleche, and former government ministers Ernesto Talvi, Pedro Bordaberry, Gabriel Gurméndez Armand-Ugon and José Amorín Batlle.

Charles Benham Larrabee, from an American expatriate family, was a trial lawyer and Justice on the New Mexico Supreme Court. English author John Andrews, designer Gabriela Hearst, and tennis player Patricia Miller also attended the school.

There are numerous examples of students who have played rugby for Uruguay, including at least five members of the Uruguay squad at the 2019 Rugby World Cup: Santiago Civetta, Juan Manuel Gaminara, Manuel Leindekar, Juan Manuel Cat, and Andrés Vilaseca.
