= Manuel Leindekar =

Uruguayan rugby union player

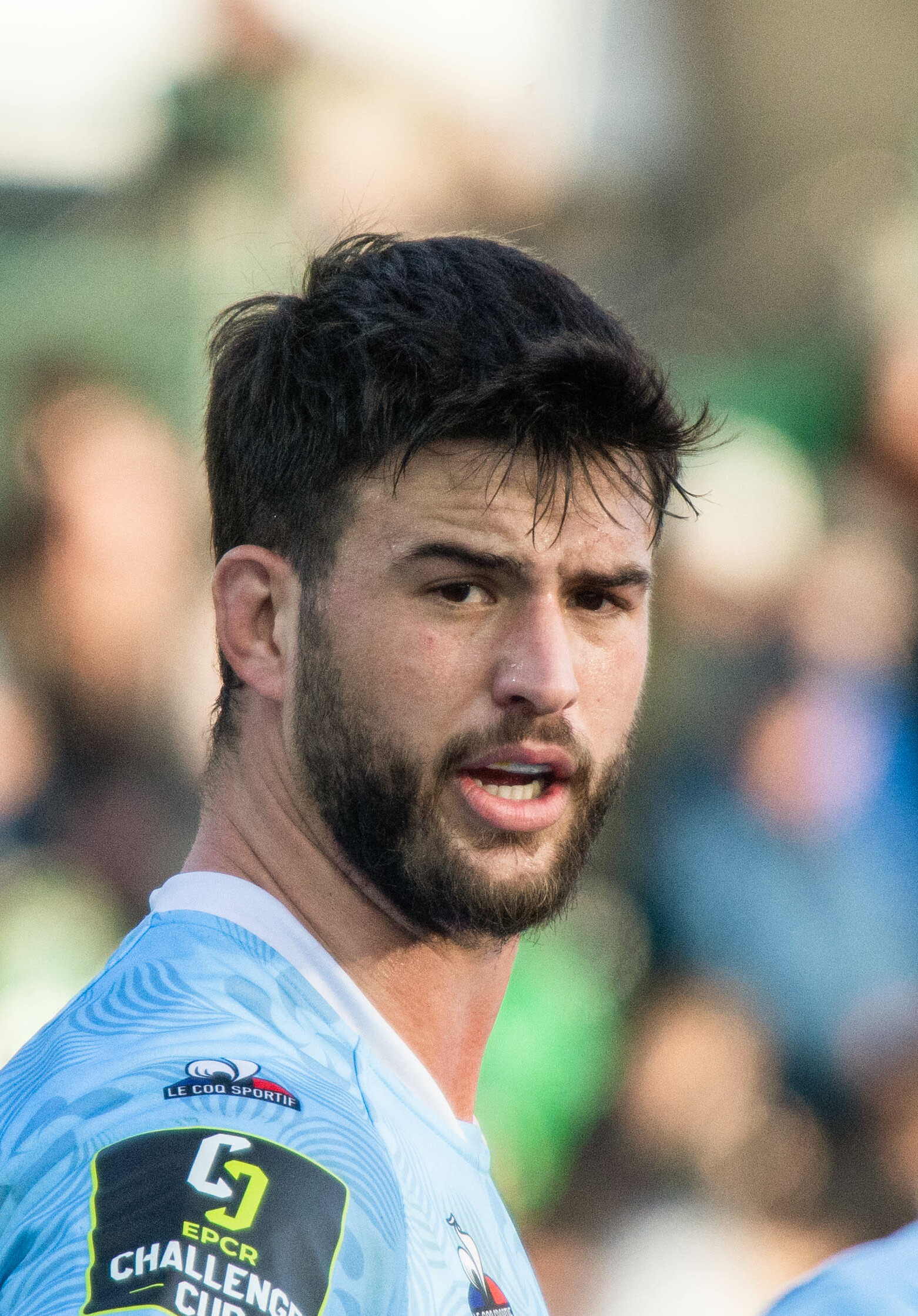
- Leindekar in 2023
- Born: Manuel Leindekar Virginio; 23 April 1997 (age 29) Montevideo, Uruguay
- Height: 6 ft 8 in (203 cm)
- Weight: 18 st 1 lb (253 lb; 115 kg)
- School: The British Schools of Montevideo

Rugby union career
- Position: Lock
- Current team: Bayonne
Amateur team(s)
| Years | Team | Apps | (Points) |
| 2015−2017 | Old Boys | | |
Senior career
| Years | Team | Apps | (Points) |
| 2017-2022 | Oyonnax | 58 | (0) |
| 2022- | Bayonne | 23 | (0) |
- Correct as of 30 June 2023
International career
| Years | Team | Apps | (Points) |
| 2015−2017 | Uruguay Under 20 | 7 | (10) |
| 2016– | Uruguay | 28 | (5) |
- Correct as of 9 September 2023

Manuel Leindekar Virginio (born 23 April 1997) is a Uruguayan rugby player whose primary position is lock. He plays for Aviron Bayonnais in the French Top 14 and for the Uruguay national rugby union team.

== Club career ==
Leindekar started his career playing in Uruguay at The British Schools and later the alumni club Old Boys.

In December 2015, he went to France to sign with Oyonnax Rugby. In mid 2022, he signed with Aviron Bayonnais.

== International career ==
Leindekar made his international debut for Uruguay on 13 May 2017, in a South American Rugby Championship game against Paraguay.

He was selected for Uruguay's 31-man squad for the 2019 Rugby World Cup on 30 August 2019.
