= Agustín Ormaechea =

Uruguay international rugby union player

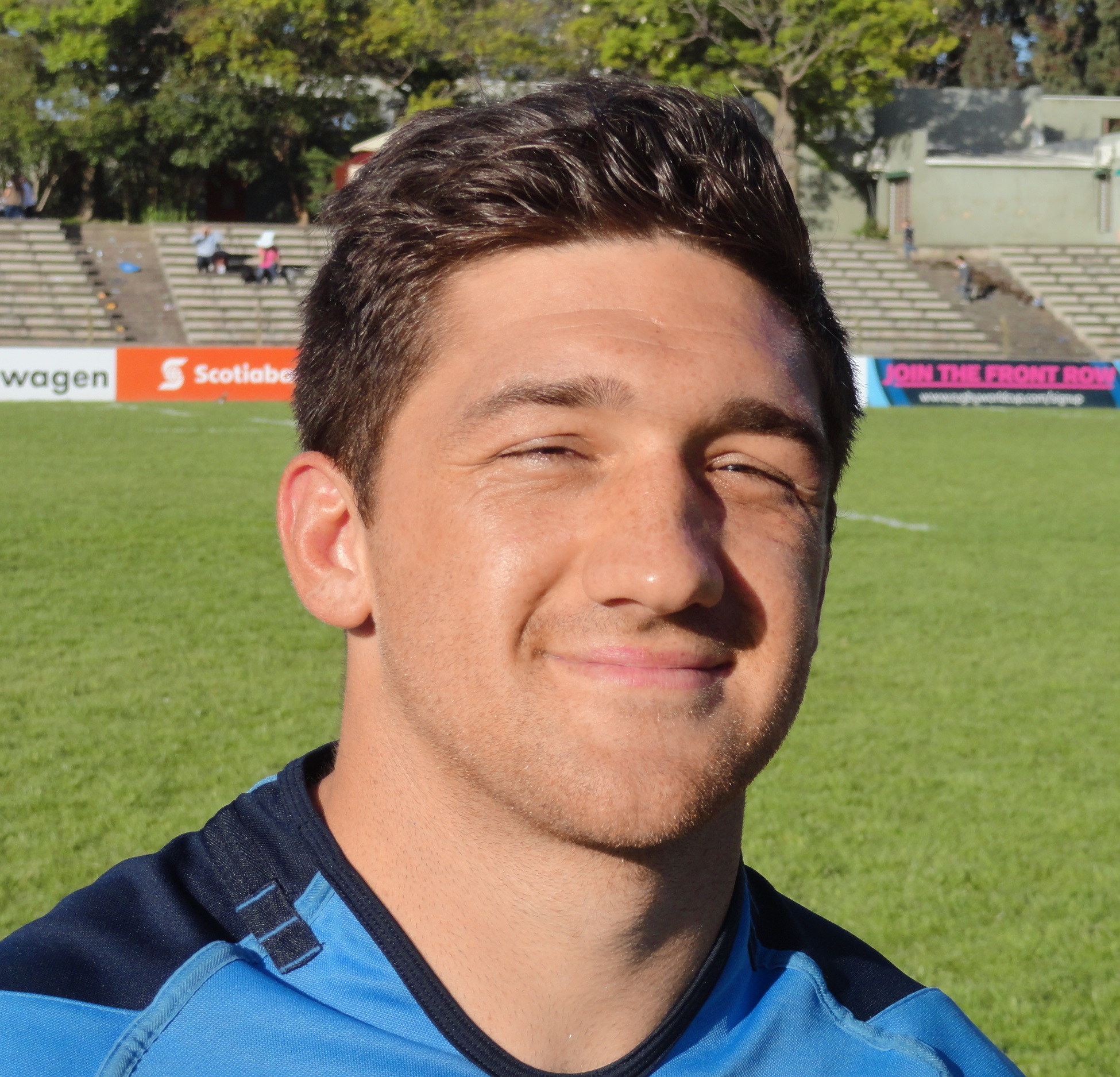
- Born: March 8, 1991 (age 35)
- Height: 5 ft 9 in (175 cm)
- Weight: 176 lb (80 kg)

Rugby union career
- Position: Scrum-Half
Amateur team(s)
Years	Team	Apps	(Points)
2009-2013	Carrasco Polo Club		
Senior career
Years	Team	Apps	(Points)
2013−17	Stade Montois	87	(62)
2017−18	RC Strasbourg	14	(12)
2018−20	Stade Montois	33	(2)
2020−	Nice	30	(29)
- Correct as of 7 May 2022
International career
Years	Team	Apps	(Points)
2010−2011	Uruguay Under 20		
2011–	Uruguay	56	(150)
- Correct as of 9 September 2023
National sevens team
Years	Team		Comps
2011-2013	Uruguay 7s		

Agustín Ormaechea (born 8 March 1991) is a Uruguayan rugby union player who plays as a scrum-half. He currently plays for Stade Montois at the Rugby Pro D2.

Ormaechea started his career in Uruguay playing for Carrasco Polo Club. In June 2013, he moved to France to play for Stade Montois.

== International career ==
Ormaechea has earned 14 caps for Uruguay, since 2011, with 3 tries and 17 penalties scored. He is involved in the 2015 Rugby World Cup. In 2015, he played Rugby World Cup with Uruguay.

Ormaechea has also played sevens for Uruguay. In 2011, he played rugby sevens at the Pan American Games. In 2013, Ormaechea was part of Uruguay's squad for the 2013 Rugby World Cup Sevens.

== Personal life ==
He is son of Uruguayan former rugby union footballer Diego Ormaechea, who is considered the greatest Uruguayan rugby union footballer of all time, and holds the record of being the oldest player ever to play in the Rugby World Cup in 1999.
