= Felipe Berchesi =

Uruguay international rugby union player (born 1991)

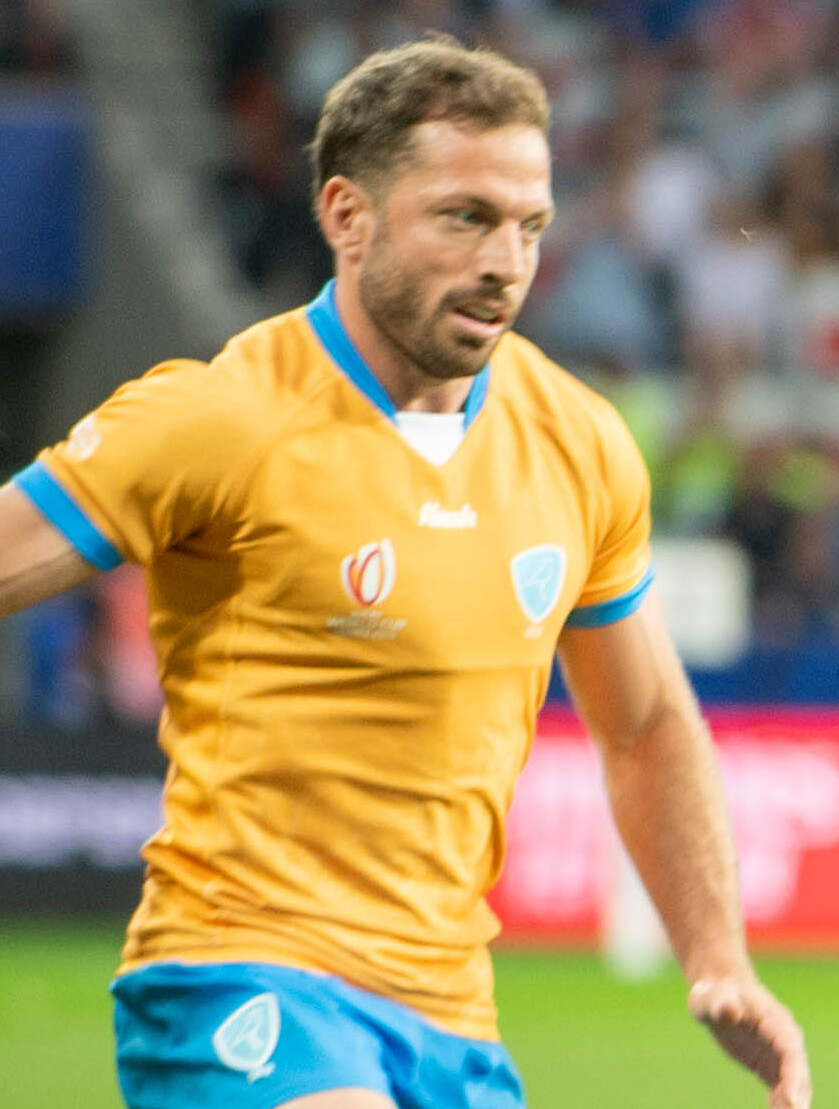
- Berchesi with Uruguay at the 2023 Rugby World Cup
- Full name: Felipe Berchesi Pisano
- Born: 12 April 1991 (age 35) Montevideo, Uruguay
- Height: 178 cm (5 ft 10 in)
- Weight: 80 kg (176 lb; 12 st 8 lb)

Rugby union career
- Position(s): Fly-half, Centre
- Current team: Dax
Senior career
| Years | Team | Apps | (Points) |
| 2013–2014 | Rugby Badia | | |
| 2014–2015 | Chambéry | 18 | (224) |
| 2015–2017 | Carcassonne | 33 | (146) |
| 2017–2023 | Dax | 64 | (456) |
- Correct as of 16 October 2021
International career
| Years | Team | Apps | (Points) |
| 2010–2011 | Uruguay U20 | 8 | (39) |
| 2011–2023 | Uruguay | 39 | (337) |
- Correct as of 16 October 2021
National sevens team
| Years | Team | | Comps |
| 2012–2016 | Uruguay | | 5 |
- Correct as of 25 September 2019

Felipe Berchesi Pisano (born 12 April 1991) is a Uruguayan former rugby union player who played as a fly-half.

== Club career ==
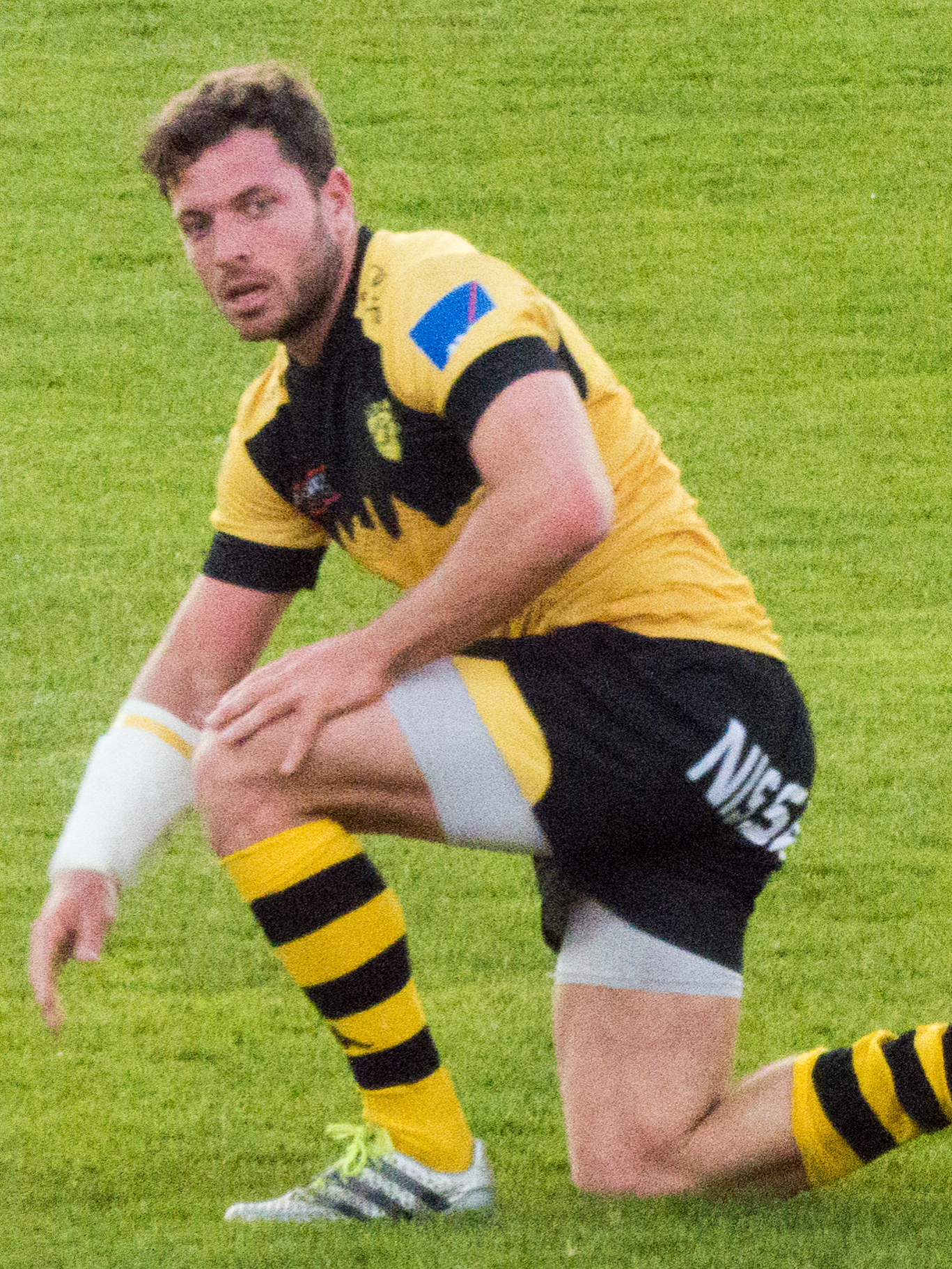
Berchesi during a match against Dax, April 2017.

Berchesi started his career in Uruguay playing for Carrasco Polo Club.

In mid 2013, he moved to Italy to play for Rugby Badia.

In mid 2014, he joined Fédérale 1 side Chambéry and after having an outstanding performance, he moved to Pro D2 side US Carcassonne.

== International career ==
He has 39 caps for Uruguay since 2011, scoring 2 tries, 48 conversions, 76 penalties and 1 drop goal, 337 points on aggregate. He had his first cap at the 16–9 win Portugal, at 13 November 2011, in Caldas da Rainha, in a tour, aged 20 years old. He was called for the 2015 Rugby World Cup, playing in 3 games and scoring 5 penalties, 15 points on aggregate. He was called once again for the 2019 Rugby World Cup, playing in all the 4 games and scoring 6 conversions and 6 penalties, 30 points on aggregate.

In 2011 he played rugby sevens at the Pan American Games.

In 2013 Berchesi was part of Uruguay's squad for the 2013 Rugby World Cup Sevens.
