= Juan Manuel Gaminara =

Uruguayan rugby union player

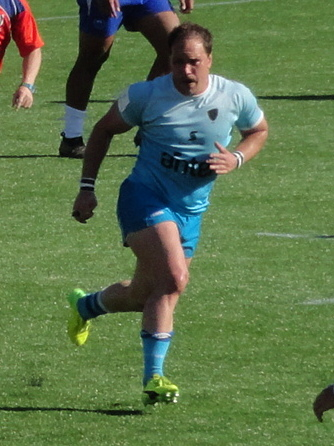
- Born: 1 May 1989 (age 37)
- Height: 1.75 m (5 ft 9 in)
- Weight: 90 kg (14 st 2 lb)

Rugby union career
- Position: Flanker
Amateur team(s)
Years	Team	Apps	(Points)
- Old Boys
International career
Years	Team	Apps	(Points)
2008−2009	Uruguay Under 20	6	(10)
2010-2019	Uruguay	71	(36)
- Correct as of 17 October 2019

Juan Manuel Gaminara (born 1 May 1989) is a Uruguayan rugby union player. He was named in Uruguay's squad for the 2015 Rugby World Cup.

== Personal ==
Gaminara was educated at The British Schools of Montevideo.

== Honours ==
Uruguay U20

- World Rugby Under 20 Trophy: 2008
