= Santiago Civetta =

Uruguayan rugby union player

Santiago Civenta
- Full name: Santiago Civenta Ponce de Leon
- Born: 28 February 1998 (age 28) Montevideo, Uruguay
- Height: 184 cm (6 ft 0 in)
- Weight: 109 kg (240 lb)
- School: The British Schools of Montevideo
- University: University of the Republic

Rugby union career
- Position: Back row
- Current team: Old Boys
Youth career
- Old Boys
Senior career
Years	Team	Apps	(Points)
2020−	Peñarol	1	(0)
- Correct as of 25 September 2019
International career
Years	Team	Apps	(Points)
2016–2018	Uruguay Under 20	12	(15)
2017–	Uruguay Sevens	12	(15)
2019–	Uruguay	26	(10)
- Correct as of 9 September 2023

Santiago Civetta Ponce de Leon (born 28 February 1998) is a Uruguayan rugby union player who generally plays as a Flanker represents Uruguay internationally. He was included in the Uruguayan squad for the 2019 Rugby World Cup which was held in Japan for the first time and also marked his first World Cup appearance.

== Career ==
He made his international debut for Uruguay against Argentina XV in a World Cup warm-up match on 23 February 2019. He also works as rugby teacher at The British Schools of Montevideo

=== International tries ===
As of 20 November 2021

Try	Opposing team	Location	Venue	Competition	Date	Result	Score
1	Russia	Montevideo, Uruguay	Estadio Charrua	2019 Rugby Nations Cup	4 June 2019	Win	48 – 26
2	Italy	Parma, Italy	Stadio Sergio Lanfranchi	2021 end-of-year rugby union internationals	20 November 2021	Loss	17 – 10
