= Diego Ormaechea =

Uruguayan rugby union footballer and coach

- Born: Diego Ormaechea; July 19, 1959 (age 67) Montevideo, Uruguay
- Height: 6 ft 0 in (1.83 m)
- Weight: 15 st 6 lb (98 kg; 216 lb)
- Notable relative: Agustín Ormaechea (son)

Rugby union career
- Position: Number eight
Senior career
Years	Team	Apps	(Points)
1979-2001	Carrasco Polo Club		
International career
Years	Team	Apps	(Points)
1979-1999	Uruguay	73	(79)

Diego Ormaechea (born 19 July 1959) is a former Uruguayan rugby union player and a current coach. He played as a number eight. Ormaechea is considered the greatest Uruguayan rugby player of all time. His contribution to rugby has been significant, not only as a player and coach, but as an inspirational personality that attracts many youngsters to the sport.

His profession is Veterinary Surgeon specialised in Racing Horses. He is one of the top veterinary surgeons in South America in his discipline.

His son, Agustín Ormaechea, is a current Uruguayan international rugby union player.

== Playing career ==
Ormaechea was born in Montevideo, Uruguay. He was introduced to rugby as a fifteen-year-old in 1976, and played for over two decades. He played most of his career at Carrasco Polo Club, winning the national championship thirteen times.

He also holds the national record for Uruguay, with 73 caps and 16 tries scored, 79 points in aggregate, during 20 years, from 1979 to 1999.

Ormaechea, aged 40 years old, was also the oldest player ever at the Rugby World Cup finals, in 1999, being the captain in his country first ever presence at the event. He scored a try in the 27-15 win over Spain.

He left rugby for a year, but later returned for a final season at Carrasco Polo Club, before putting an end to his long career, in 2001, aged 41.

== Coaching ==
Ormaechea was the coach of the Uruguay national team that qualified and played at the 2003 Rugby World Cup finals. He managed to win again a game, at the 24-12 defeat of Georgia.

Ormaechea is currently the coach of Carrasco Polo Club.

Together with his friends Washington Amarillo and Eduardo Loedel Soca, he promoted and implemented the changes that allowed Uruguay to participate in all Under 17, 18, 19 and 20, as well as Sevens, international competitions.

== Honors ==
- In 2019, World Rugby inducts Ormaechea to its Hall of Fame, the first Uruguayan rugby player ever, alongside Richie McCaw, Shiggy Konno, Os du Randt, Peter Fatialofa, and Graham Henry.
