= Carrasco Polo Club =

Uruguayan sports club

Carrasco Polo club
- Full name: Carrasco Polo Club
- Founded: 1933; 93 years ago
- Ground: Cno. Brig. Gral. Servando Gómez 2749
- Location: Carrasco, Montevideo, Uruguay
- League(s): Campeonato Uruguayo (Rugby)
- Affiliations: URU (Rugby)
- Activities: Equitation, field hockey, football, polo, rugby union, tennis
- President: Santiago Slinger
- Colors
- Website: cpc.com.uy

Carrasco Polo Club is a Uruguayan sports club from the Carrasco neighbourhood of Montevideo. Its name references directly the polo team and the fact that Carrasco has one of Uruguay's leading equestrian centres. Apart from polo, the club hosts a large variety of sports, such as equitation, field hockey, football, rugby union and tennis.

The rugby union team currently competes in Campeonato Uruguayo, the first division of Uruguayan league system. Carrasco Polo is the most successful rugby club of Uruguay, with 28 championships won.

The club's main rival is Old Christians.

== History ==
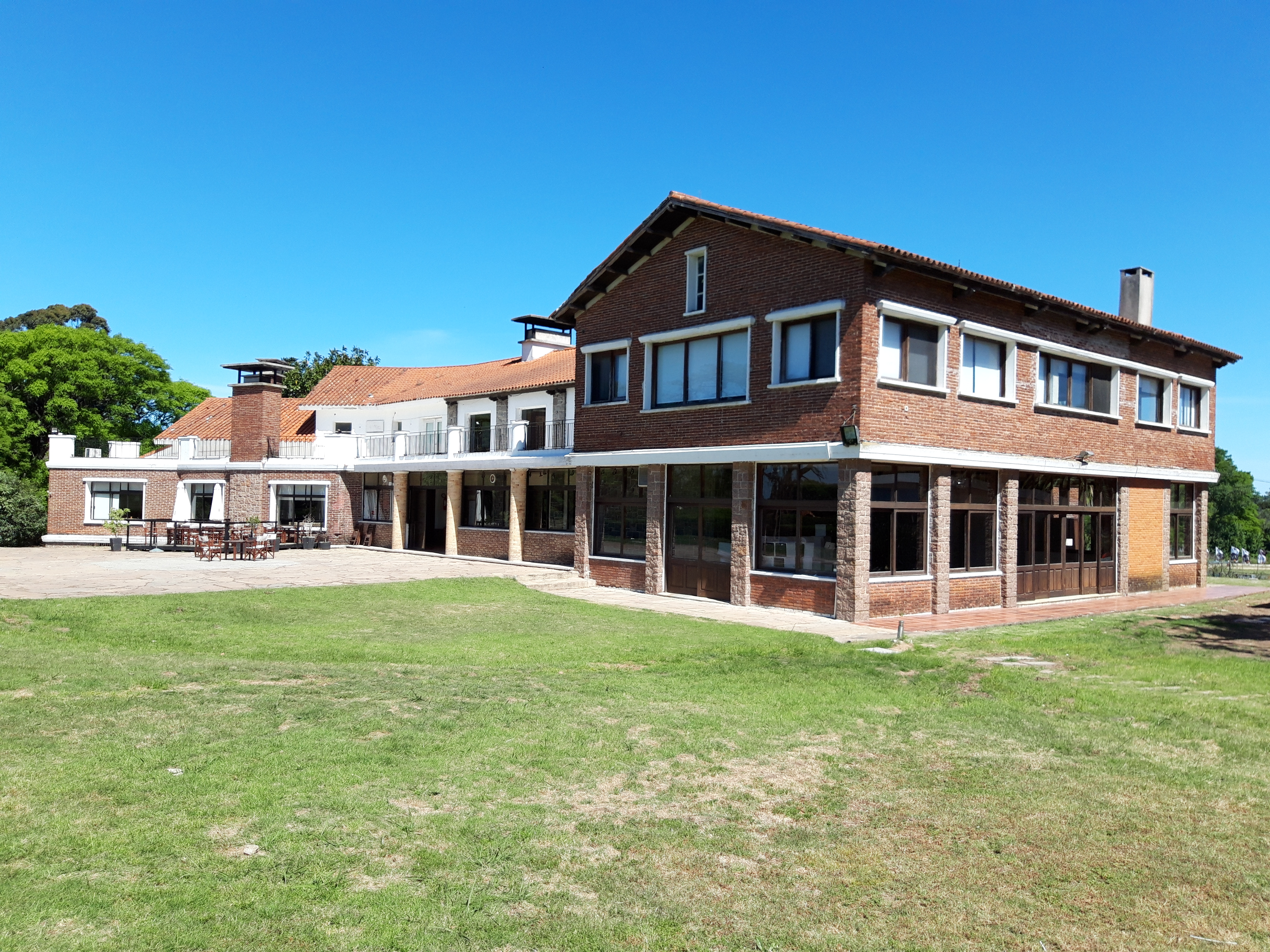
Carrasco clubhouse

Carrasco Polo Club was founded as an equestrian club in 1933 by 40 former members of recently dissolved Montevideo Polo Club, that had been established 3 years earlier. The first president designed by an assembly was Pedro Barcia, who led the club until 1944. Between 1949 and 1952 Carrasco Polo built its new facilities and polo fields.

In 1949, "rugby criollo" was introduced into the Carrasco Polo Club, which not unlike the Montevideo Cricket Club (MVCC), would become more renowned for rugby than the sport it was named for.

Club uniform (Football, hockey, rugby)

In 1950, the first edition of Campeonato Uruguayo was held, being contested by Old Boys, Colonia Rugby, and multisport clubs such as the MVCC and Carrasco Polo (which supplied two XVs).

Carrasco Polo Club was transformed by the coaching of Amarillo Washington, who used scientific methods to replace the earlier habits of "training hard, but then after matches going to the bar to eat and drink everything." Carrasco's leading player Diego Ormaechea had been introduced to the sport as a fifteen-year-old in 1976 and was still playing for club and country more than twenty years later.

In 1993, Carrasco Polo Club beat a Buenos Aires squad which included 14 national team players. The 2003 Rugby World Cup finals squad had 12 players from Carrasco Polo Club. Diego Ormaechea, considered the best Uruguayan rugby union player of all time, played all his career at Carrasco. He's currently the head coach of the rugby union team.

== Honours ==
Rugby union

- Campeonato Uruguayo (28): 1952, 1961, 1966, 1981, 1983, 1990, 1991, 1992, 1993, 1994, 1995, 1996, 1997, 1998, 1999, 2000, 2001, 2002, 2003, 2004, 2005, 2006, 2008, 2009, 2011, 2012, 2014, 2020

== Bibliography ==
- Richards, Huw A Game for Hooligans: The History of Rugby Union (Mainstream Publishing, Edinburgh, 2007, ISBN 978-1-84596-255-5)
