= Uruguayan Rugby Union =

Rugby union governing body in Uruguay

Unión de Rugby del Uruguay
- Sport: Rugby union
- Founded: 1951; 75 years ago
- World Rugby affiliation: 1989
- Sudamérica Rugby affiliation: 1989
- President: Sebastian Piñeyrua
- Men's coach: Meneses
- Website: uru.org.uy

The Uruguayan Rugby Union (Spanish: Unión de Rugby del Uruguay) is the governing body for rugby union in Uruguay. They were founded in 1951 and have qualified for the Rugby World Cup on a number of occasions.

== Foundation and affiliation ==
Rugby had first been played in Uruguay in 1865 due to the British expatriate community playing between members of the local cricket clubs. Montevideo Cricket Club became one of the strongest rugby clubs in the region due to rugby mostly staying within the British community. The Uruguayan Rugby Union was founded in 1951 following a Uruguayan representative team taking part in the El Sudamericano de Rugby against teams from Argentina, Chile and Brazil. They became affiliated to the International Rugby Football Board (now World Rugby) in 1989.

Most of the clubs that are members are affiliated to English speaking schools but the Uruguayan Rugby Union also promote the sport in sports centres and in prisons. In 2013, with funding from the Uruguayan government and private investment, the Uruguyan Rugby Union had a rugby performance centre built at Charrúa Stadium. It was completed in 2016. Before 2015, the Uruguayan Rugby Union was fully amateur with no payments to its national team players. After Uruguay qualified for the 2015 Rugby World Cup, the Union started making payments to players of the Uruguay national rugby union team due to an increase in funding. Contrary to many professional rugby nations, the Uruguayan Rugby Union often encourages its national players to play abroad in England or France to gain experience to benefit the Union.

They have been represented in the 1999, 2003, 2015 and 2019 Rugby World Cups.
