= 2003 Rugby World Cup squads =

Lists of players

The 2003 Rugby World Cup was played in Australia between 10 October and 22 November 2003.

== Pool A ==
=== Australia ===
Head coach: Eddie Jones

Note: Flags indicate national union for the club/province as defined by World Rugby.

Player	Position	Date of birth (age)	Caps	Club/province
Brendan Cannon	Hooker	5 April 1973 (aged 30)	18	(Australia) Waratahs
Jeremy Paul	Hooker	14 March 1977 (aged 26)	37	(Australia) Brumbies
Al Baxter	Prop	21 January 1977 (aged 26)	1	(Australia) Waratahs
Ben Darwin	Prop	17 October 1976 (aged 26)	22	(Australia) Brumbies
Matt Dunning	Prop	19 December 1978 (aged 24)	0	(Australia) Waratahs
Bill Young	Prop	4 March 1974 (aged 29)	19	(Australia) Brumbies
David Giffin	Lock	6 November 1973 (aged 29)	45	(Australia) Brumbies
Justin Harrison	Lock	20 April 1974 (aged 29)	17	(Australia) Brumbies
Nathan Sharpe	Lock	26 February 1978 (aged 25)	13	(Australia) Queensland Reds
Dan Vickerman	Lock	4 June 1979 (aged 24)	11	(Australia) Brumbies
Matt Cockbain	Flanker	19 September 1972 (aged 31)	56	(Australia) Queensland Reds
David Croft	Flanker	22 February 1979 (aged 24)	4	(Australia) Queensland Reds
George Smith	Flanker	14 July 1980 (aged 23)	28	(Australia) Brumbies
Phil Waugh	Flanker	22 September 1979 (aged 24)	15	(Australia) Waratahs
David Lyons	Number 8	15 June 1980 (aged 23)	14	(Australia) Waratahs
John Roe	Number 8	10 April 1977 (aged 26)	0	(Australia) Queensland Reds
George Gregan (c)	Scrum-half	19 April 1973 (aged 30)	89	(Australia) Brumbies
Chris Whitaker	Scrum-half	19 October 1974 (aged 28)	15	(Australia) Waratahs
Elton Flatley	Fly-half	7 May 1977 (aged 26)	27	(Australia) Queensland Reds
Stephen Larkham	Fly-half	29 May 1974 (aged 29)	59	(Australia) Brumbies
Matt Giteau	Centre	29 September 1982 (aged 21)	4	(Australia) Brumbies
Nathan Grey	Centre	31 March 1975 (aged 28)	33	(Australia) Waratahs
Morgan Turinui	Centre	5 January 1982 (aged 21)	3	(Australia) Waratahs
Stirling Mortlock	Centre	20 May 1977 (aged 26)	20	(Australia) Brumbies
Mat Rogers	Wing	1 February 1976 (aged 27)	12	(Australia) Waratahs
Joe Roff	Wing	20 September 1975 (aged 28)	76	(Australia) Brumbies
Wendell Sailor	Wing	16 July 1974 (aged 29)	13	(Australia) Queensland Reds
Lote Tuqiri	Wing	26 September 1979 (aged 24)	7	(Australia) Waratahs
Chris Latham	Fullback	8 September 1975 (aged 28)	38	(Australia) Queensland Reds
Matt Burke	Fullback	26 March 1973 (aged 30)	72	(Australia) Waratahs

=== Ireland ===
Head coach: Eddie O'Sullivan

Note: Flags indicate national union for the club/province as defined by World Rugby.

Player	Position	Date of birth (age)	Caps	Club/province
Shane Byrne	Hooker	18 July 1971 (aged 32)	22	(Ireland) Leinster
Frankie Sheahan	Hooker	27 August 1976 (aged 27)	13	(Ireland) Munster
Keith Wood (c)	Hooker	27 January 1972 (aged 31)	53	(Ireland) Munster
Simon Best	Prop	11 February 1978 (aged 25)	3	(Ireland) Ulster
Reggie Corrigan	Prop	19 November 1970 (aged 32)	26	(Ireland) Leinster
John Hayes	Prop	2 November 1973 (aged 29)	34	(Ireland) Munster
Marcus Horan	Prop	7 September 1977 (aged 26)	12	(Ireland) Munster
Gary Longwell	Lock	30 July 1971 (aged 32)	25	(Ireland) Ulster
Donncha O'Callaghan	Lock	24 March 1979 (aged 24)	5	(Ireland) Munster
Paul O'Connell	Lock	20 October 1979 (aged 23)	10	(Ireland) Munster
Malcolm O'Kelly	Lock	19 July 1974 (aged 29)	54	(Ireland) Leinster
Simon Easterby	Flanker	21 July 1975 (aged 28)	23	(Wales) Llanelli
Keith Gleeson	Flanker	17 June 1976 (aged 27)	16	(Ireland) Leinster
Alan Quinlan	Flanker	13 July 1974 (aged 29)	16	(Ireland) Munster
David Wallace	Flanker	8 July 1976 (aged 27)	18	(Ireland) Munster
Victor Costello	Number 8	23 October 1970 (aged 32)	32	(Ireland) Leinster
Anthony Foley	Number 8	30 October 1973 (aged 29)	45	(Ireland) Munster
Eric Miller	Number 8	23 September 1975 (aged 28)	35	(Ireland) Leinster
Neil Doak	Scrum-half	21 June 1972 (aged 31)	0	(Ireland) Ulster
Guy Easterby	Scrum-half	21 March 1971 (aged 32)	19	(England) Rotherham
Peter Stringer	Scrum-half	13 December 1977 (aged 25)	36	(Ireland) Munster
David Humphreys	Fly-half	10 September 1971 (aged 32)	56	(Ireland) Ulster
Ronan O'Gara	Fly-half	7 March 1977 (aged 26)	33	(Ireland) Munster
Paddy Wallace	Centre	27 August 1979 (aged 24)	0	(Ireland) Ulster
Kevin Maggs	Centre	3 June 1974 (aged 29)	53	(England) Bath
Brian O'Driscoll	Centre	21 January 1979 (aged 24)	41	(Ireland) Leinster
Anthony Horgan	Wing	15 November 1976 (aged 26)	3	(Ireland) Munster
Shane Horgan	Wing	18 July 1978 (aged 25)	19	(Ireland) Leinster
John Kelly	Wing	18 April 1974 (aged 29)	13	(Ireland) Munster
Tyrone Howe	Wing	2 April 1971 (aged 32)	10	(Ireland) Ulster
Girvan Dempsey	Fullback	2 October 1975 (aged 28)	38	(Ireland) Leinster

=== Argentina ===
Head coach: Marcelo Loffreda

Note: Flags indicate national union for the club/province as defined by World Rugby.

Player	Position	Date of birth (age)	Caps	Club/province
Mario Ledesma	Hooker	17 May 1973 (aged 30)	39	(France) Castres
Federico Méndez	Hooker	2 August 1972 (aged 31)	65	(Argentina) Mendoza
Roberto Diego Grau	Prop	16 July 1970 (aged 33)	45	(Argentina) Liceo
Omar Hasan	Prop	21 April 1971 (aged 32)	43	(France) Agen
Mauricio Reggiardo	Prop	22 February 1970 (aged 33)	47	(France) Castres
Rodrigo Roncero	Prop	16 February 1977 (aged 26)	6	(England) Gloucester
Martín Scelzo	Prop	5 February 1976 (aged 27)	24	(France) Narbonne
Patricio Albacete	Lock	9 February 1981 (aged 22)	6	(France) Colomiers
Rimas Álvarez Kairelis	Lock	22 July 1974 (aged 29)	20	(France) Perpignan
Ignacio Fernández Lobbe	Lock	20 November 1974 (aged 28)	42	(France) Castres
Pedro Sporleder	Lock	2 January 1974 (aged 29)	76	(Argentina) Curupaytí
Martín Durand	Flanker	30 May 1975 (aged 28)	24	(Argentina) Club Champagnat
Rolando Martín	Flanker	23 September 1968 (aged 35)	83	(Argentina) San Isidro Club
Lucas Ostiglia	Flanker	3 May 1976 (aged 27)	19	(Argentina) Hindú Club
Santiago Phelan	Flanker	31 March 1974 (aged 29)	43	(Argentina) Club Atlético San Isidro
Pablo Bouza	Number 8	9 May 1973 (aged 30)	19	(Argentina) Duendes
Gonzalo Longo	Number 8	14 March 1974 (aged 29)	29	(France) Narbonne
Agustín Pichot (c)	Scrum-half	22 August 1974 (aged 29)	47	(France) Stade Français
Nicolás Fernández Miranda	Scrum-half	25 November 1972 (aged 30)	33	(Argentina) Hindú Club
Felipe Contepomi	Fly-half	20 August 1977 (aged 26)	34	(Ireland) Leinster
Gonzalo Quesada	Fly-half	2 May 1974 (aged 29)	35	(France) Béziers
Juan Fernández Miranda	Centre	7 November 1974 (aged 28)	19	(Argentina) Hindú Club
Manuel Contepomi	Centre	20 August 1977 (aged 26)	14	(Argentina) Club Newman
Martín Gaitán	Centre	15 June 1978 (aged 25)	5	(France) Biarritz
José Orengo	Centre	26 April 1976 (aged 27)	32	(France) Grenoble
Diego Albanese	Wing	17 September 1973 (aged 30)	52	(England) Leeds Tykes
José María Núñez Piossek	Wing	6 December 1976 (aged 26)	12	(Argentina) Huirapuca
Hernán Senillosa	Wing	1 October 1977 (aged 26)	10	(Argentina) Hindú Club
Ignacio Corleto	Fullback	21 June 1978 (aged 25)	25	(France) Stade Français
Juan Martín Hernández	Fullback	7 August 1982 (aged 21)	6	(Argentina) Deportiva Francesa

=== Romania ===
Head coach: (France) Bernard Charreyre

Note: Flags indicate national union for the club/province as defined by World Rugby.

Player	Position	Date of birth (age)	Caps	Club/province
Răzvan Mavrodin	Hooker	29 October 1973 (aged 29)	19	(France) Tarbes
Marius Țincu	Hooker	7 April 1978 (aged 25)	15	(France) Pau
Paulică Ion	Prop	10 January 1983 (aged 20)	0	(Romania) Steaua București
Cezar Popescu	Prop	29 December 1976 (aged 26)	4	(Romania) Steaua București
Marcel Socaciu	Prop	23 April 1972 (aged 31)	13	(Italy) Rovigo
Petrișor Toderașc	Prop	15 July 1980 (aged 23)	20	(Romania) Farul Constanța
Petru Bălan	Prop	12 July 1976 (aged 27)	36	(France) Biarritz
Silviu Florea	Prop	19 April 1977 (aged 26)	12	(Romania) Steaua București
Marius Pantelimon	Lock	27 February 1979 (aged 24)	0	(Romania) Farul Constanța
Cristian Petre	Lock	22 March 1979 (aged 24)	17	(France) Racing 92
Bogdan Tudor	Lock	29 November 1976 (aged 26)	1	(France) Valence
Augustin Petrechei	Lock	4 August 1980 (aged 23)	8	(France) Bourgoin
Sorin Socol	Lock	30 November 1977 (aged 25)	13	(France) Brive
George Chiriac	Flanker	30 October 1979 (aged 23)	16	(Romania) Farul Constanța
Florin Corodeanu	Flanker	26 March 1977 (aged 26)	32	(France) Grenoble
Cornel Tatu	Flanker	12 July 1983 (aged 20)	0	(Romania) Steaua București
Ovidiu Tonița	Flanker	6 August 1980 (aged 23)	20	(France) Biarritz
Alexandru Tudori	Flanker	11 October 1977 (aged 25)	2	(Romania) Dinamo București
Marius Niculai	Number 8	20 May 1979 (aged 24)	0	(France) Lavelanet
Iulian Andrei	Scrum-half	28 July 1974 (aged 29)	2	(Romania) Steaua București
Cristian Podea	Scrum-half	22 February 1979 (aged 24)	8	(Romania) Universitatea Cluj
Lucian Sîrbu	Scrum-half	16 October 1976 (aged 26)	24	(France) Racing 92
Ionuț Tofan	Fly-half	8 March 1977 (aged 26)	34	(France) Racing 92
Romeo Gontineac (c)	Centre	18 December 1973 (aged 29)	47	(France) Aurillac
Valentin Maftei	Centre	26 September 1974 (aged 29)	25	(France) Valence
Gabriel Brezoianu	Centre	18 January 1977 (aged 26)	42	(France) Bordeaux-Bègles
Mihai Vioreanu	Centre	3 October 1974 (aged 29)	26	(Republic of Ireland) De La Salle Palmerston
Vasile Ghioc	Wing	28 February 1978 (aged 25)	14	(Romania) Dinamo București
Cătălin Nicolae	Wing	22 July 1980 (aged 23)	2	(Romania) Steaua București
Ion Teodorescu	Wing	27 July 1976 (aged 27)	9	(Romania) Farul Constanța
Bogdan Voicu	Wing	16 December 1981 (aged 21)	1	(Romania) Universitatea Cluj
Cristian Săuan	Wing	18 March 1974 (aged 29)	15	(Italy) Rovigo
Dănuț Dumbravă	Fullback	6 August 1981 (aged 22)	7	(Romania) Steaua București

=== Namibia ===
Head coach: (New Zealand) David Waterston

Note: Flags indicate national union for the club/province as defined by World Rugby.

Player	Position	Date of birth (age)	Caps	Club/province
Phillipus Isaacs	Hooker	8 May 1973 (aged 30)	5	(Namibia) Reho Falcon
Johannes Meyer	Hooker	19 February 1981 (aged 22)	2	(Namibia) Wanderers
Cor van Tonder	Hooker	21 March 1978 (aged 25)	4	(Namibia) United
Andries Blaauw	Prop	25 March 1970 (aged 33)	19	(Namibia) Grootfontein
Niel du Toit	Prop	12 September 1969 (aged 34)	2	(South Africa) Boland
Johan Jenkins	Prop	15 November 1977 (aged 25)	2	(Namibia) United
Kees Lensing	Prop	1 June 1978 (aged 25)	5	(England) Leeds Tykes
Archie Graham	Lock	20 May 1974 (aged 29)	6	(Namibia) Transnamib
Eben Isaacs	Lock	16 July 1970 (aged 33)	17	(Namibia) Reho Falcon
Heino Senekal	Lock	20 October 1975 (aged 27)	13	(England) Cornish Pirates
Shaun van Rooi	Flanker	27 October 1982 (aged 20)	1	(Namibia) Reho Falcon
Wolfie Duvenhage	Flanker	31 December 1978 (aged 24)	8	(Namibia) Wanderers
Herman Lintvelt	Flanker	6 September 1976 (aged 27)	15	(Namibia) United
Schalk van der Merwe	Flanker	30 August 1974 (aged 29)	14	(England) Harlequins
Sean Furter (c)	Number 8	9 January 1977 (aged 26)	13	(Namibia) United
Jurgens van Lill	Number 8	23 May 1981 (aged 22)	4	(Namibia) Wanderers
Hakkies Husselman	Scrum-half	3 November 1972 (aged 30)	7	(South Africa) Boland
Ronaldo Pedro	Scrum-half	22 August 1972 (aged 31)	9	(Namibia) Reho Falcon
Morné Schreuder	Fly-half	5 September 1979 (aged 24)	7	(Namibia) United
Emile Wessels	Fly-half	27 June 1979 (aged 24)	3	unknown
Corne Powell	Centre	27 May 1974 (aged 29)	10	(Namibia) Wanderers
Rudie van Vuuren	Centre	20 September 1972 (aged 31)	14	(Namibia) Wanderers
Du Preez Grobler	Centre	8 June 1977 (aged 26)	7	(Namibia) United
Regardt Kruger	Centre	26 September 1981 (aged 22)	1	(Namibia) Wanderers
Deon Mouton	Wing	20 November 1974 (aged 28)	12	(Namibia) Kudus
Melrick Africa	Wing	18 January 1978 (aged 25)	3	(Namibia) Reho Falcon
Niel Swanepoel	Wing	17 July 1980 (aged 23)	0	(Namibia) United
Vincent Dreyer	Fullback	8 October 1978 (aged 25)	1	(Namibia) United
Jurie Booysen	Fullback	30 July 1981 (aged 22)	2	(Namibia) Wanderers
Deon Grunschloss	Fullback	7 April 1973 (aged 30)	0	(Namibia) Walvis Bay

== Pool B ==
=== France ===
Head coach: Bernard Laporte

France called up lock Thibaut Privat as a replacement for Olivier Brouzet, who suffered a dislocated shoulder in their quarter-final against Ireland.

Note: Flags indicate national union for the club/province as defined by World Rugby.

Player	Position	Date of birth (age)	Caps	Club/province
Yannick Bru	Hooker	22 May 1973 (aged 30)	8	(France) Toulouse
Raphaël Ibañez	Hooker	17 February 1973 (aged 30)	66	(France) Castres
Jean-Jacques Crenca	Prop	3 April 1969 (aged 34)	28	(France) Agen
Sylvain Marconnet	Prop	8 April 1976 (aged 27)	33	(France) Stade Français
Olivier Milloud	Prop	9 December 1975 (aged 27)	10	(France) Bourgoin
Jean-Baptiste Poux	Prop	26 September 1979 (aged 24)	7	(France) Toulouse
David Auradou	Lock	13 November 1973 (aged 29)	34	(France) Stade Français
Olivier Brouzet	Lock	22 November 1972 (aged 30)	66	(France) Clermont
Fabien Pelous	Lock	7 December 1973 (aged 29)	80	(France) Toulouse
Thibaut Privat	Lock	4 February 1979 (aged 24)	7	(France) Clermont
Jérôme Thion	Lock	2 December 1977 (aged 25)	5	(France) Biarritz
Serge Betsen	Flanker	25 March 1974 (aged 29)	31	(France) Biarritz
Sébastien Chabal	Flanker	8 December 1977 (aged 25)	17	(France) Bourgoin
Olivier Magne	Flanker	11 April 1973 (aged 30)	66	(France) Clermont
Patrick Tabacco	Flanker	23 April 1974 (aged 29)	12	(France) Stade Français
Imanol Harinordoquy	Number 8	20 February 1980 (aged 23)	20	(France) Pau
Christian Labit	Number 8	11 February 1971 (aged 32)	12	(France) Toulouse
Fabien Galthié (c)	Scrum-half	20 March 1969 (aged 34)	59	(France) Stade Français
Dimitri Yachvili	Scrum-half	19 September 1980 (aged 23)	7	(France) Biarritz
Gérald Merceron	Fly-half	25 February 1973 (aged 30)	26	(France) Clermont
Frédéric Michalak	Fly-half	16 October 1982 (aged 20)	12	(France) Toulouse
Yannick Jauzion	Centre	28 July 1978 (aged 25)	10	(France) Toulouse
Brian Liebenberg	Centre	19 September 1979 (aged 24)	3	(France) Stade Français
Tony Marsh	Centre	12 August 1972 (aged 31)	11	(France) Clermont
Damien Traille	Centre	12 June 1979 (aged 24)	24	(France) Pau
David Bory	Wing	8 March 1976 (aged 27)	18	(France) Clermont
Christophe Dominici	Wing	20 May 1972 (aged 31)	30	(France) Stade Français
Pépito Elhorga	Wing	6 January 1978 (aged 25)	6	(France) Agen
Aurélien Rougerie	Wing	26 September 1980 (aged 23)	22	(France) Clermont
Nicolas Brusque	Fullback	7 August 1976 (aged 27)	11	(France) Biarritz
Clément Poitrenaud	Fullback	20 May 1982 (aged 21)	11	(France) Toulouse

=== Scotland ===
Head coach: Ian McGeechan

Note: Flags indicate national union for the club/province as defined by World Rugby.

Player	Position	Date of birth (age)	Caps	Club/province
Gordon Bulloch	Hooker	26 March 1975 (aged 28)	55	(Scotland) Glasgow Warriors
Dougie Hall	Hooker	24 September 1980 (aged 23)	1	(Scotland) Edinburgh
Robbie Russell	Hooker	1 May 1976 (aged 27)	15	(England) Saracens
Bruce Douglas	Prop	10 February 1980 (aged 23)	12	(Scotland) Border Reivers
Allan Jacobsen	Prop	22 September 1978 (aged 25)	3	(Scotland) Edinburgh
Gavin Kerr	Prop	3 April 1977 (aged 26)	7	(England) Leeds Tykes
Gordon McIlwham	Prop	13 November 1969 (aged 33)	15	(Ireland) Munster
Tom Smith	Prop	31 October 1971 (aged 31)	46	(England) Northampton Saints
Stuart Grimes	Lock	4 April 1974 (aged 29)	51	(England) Newcastle Falcons
Nathan Hines	Lock	29 November 1976 (aged 26)	14	(Scotland) Edinburgh
Scott Murray	Lock	15 January 1976 (aged 27)	51	(Scotland) Edinburgh
Cameron Mather	Flanker	20 August 1972 (aged 31)	4	(Scotland) Edinburgh
Martin Leslie	Flanker	25 October 1971 (aged 31)	35	(Scotland) Edinburgh
Jason White	Flanker	17 April 1978 (aged 25)	27	(Scotland) Glasgow Warriors
Ross Beattie	Flanker	15 November 1977 (aged 25)	6	(England) Bristol
Jon Petrie	Number 8	19 October 1976 (aged 26)	22	(Scotland) Glasgow Warriors
Simon Taylor	Number 8	17 August 1979 (aged 24)	25	(Scotland) Edinburgh
Bryan Redpath (c)	Scrum-half	2 July 1971 (aged 32)	55	(England) Sale Sharks
Mike Blair	Scrum-half	20 April 1981 (aged 22)	7	(Scotland) Edinburgh
Graeme Beveridge	Scrum-half	17 February 1976 (aged 27)	5	(Scotland) Glasgow Warriors
Gregor Townsend	Fly-half	26 April 1973 (aged 30)	77	(Scotland) Border Reivers
Gordon Ross	Fly-half	8 March 1978 (aged 25)	9	(England) Leeds Tykes
Andy Craig	Centre	16 March 1976 (aged 27)	14	(England) Orrell
Andrew Henderson	Centre	3 February 1980 (aged 23)	10	(Scotland) Glasgow Warriors
Ben Hinshelwood	Centre	22 March 1977 (aged 26)	5	(England) Worcester Warriors
James McLaren	Centre	28 July 1972 (aged 31)	26	(France) Bordeaux-Bègles
Simon Danielli	Wing	8 September 1979 (aged 24)	2	(England) Bath
Kenny Logan	Wing	3 April 1972 (aged 31)	65	(England) London Wasps
Nikki Walker	Wing	5 March 1982 (aged 21)	3	(Scotland) Border Reivers
Chris Paterson	Fullback	30 March 1978 (aged 25)	35	(Scotland) Edinburgh
Glenn Metcalfe	Fullback	15 April 1970 (aged 33)	36	(Scotland) Glasgow Warriors

=== Fiji ===
Head coach: (New Zealand) Mac McCallion

Note: Flags indicate national union for the club/province as defined by World Rugby.

Player	Position	Date of birth (age)	Caps	Club/province
Isaia Rasila	Hooker	29 April 1969 (aged 34)	32	(Fiji) Nadroga
Bill Gadolo	Hooker	1 May 1977 (aged 26)	7	(Fiji) Nadroga
Greg Smith (c)	Hooker	14 July 1974 (aged 29)	40	(New Zealand) Waikato
Richard Nyholt	Prop	25 October 1975 (aged 27)	11	(Australia) University of Queensland
Joeli Veitayaki	Prop	12 January 1967 (aged 36)	45	(New Zealand) King Country
Nacanieli Seru	Prop	20 July 1969 (aged 34)	2	(Fiji) Suva
Kele Leawere	Lock	27 April 1974 (aged 29)	5	(Fiji) Nadroga
Emori Katalau	Lock	9 April 1967 (aged 36)	47	(Wales) Llanelli
Ifereimi Rawaqa	Lock	20 September 1980 (aged 23)	8	(Fiji) Lautoka
Vula Maimuri	Lock	3 November 1975 (aged 27)	1	(New Zealand) North Harbour
Apenisa Naevo	Lock	24 February 1973 (aged 30)	31	(New Zealand) Counties Manukau
Alifereti Doviverata	Flanker	14 June 1976 (aged 27)	24	(Japan) Yamaha Júbilo
Kitione Salawa	Flanker	26 July 1976 (aged 27)	4	(Fiji) Gaunavou
Sisa Koyamaibole	Flanker	6 March 1981 (aged 22)	18	(Japan) Toyota Industries Shuttles
Koli Sewabu	Flanker	15 January 1975 (aged 28)	21	(Japan) Yamaha Júbilo
Setareki Tawake	Number 8	1 March 1969 (aged 34)	22	(Fiji) Suva
Alfie Mocelutu	Number 8	9 July 1971 (aged 32)	34	(Ireland) City of Derry
Samisoni Rabaka	Scrum-half	19 April 1969 (aged 34)	27	(Fiji) Nadi
Jacob Rauluni	Scrum-half	25 June 1972 (aged 31)	40	(England) Rotherham
Mosese Rauluni	Scrum-half	27 June 1975 (aged 28)	18	(Australia) Brisbane Easts
Nicky Little	Fly-half	13 September 1976 (aged 27)	49	(England) Saracens
Waisale Serevi	Fly-half	20 May 1968 (aged 35)	36	(France) Stade Montois
Seru Rabeni	Centre	27 December 1978 (aged 24)	11	(New Zealand) Otago
Saimoni Rokini	Centre	9 December 1972 (aged 30)	10	(Fiji) Naitasiri
Epeli Ruivadra	Centre	1 June 1977 (aged 26)	5	(Fiji) Tailevu
Isa Nacewa	Centre	22 July 1982 (aged 21)	0	(New Zealand) Auckland
Rupeni Caucaunibuca	Wing	5 July 1980 (aged 23)	2	(New Zealand) Blues
Aisea Tuilevu	Wing	13 July 1972 (aged 31)	14	(New Zealand) North Harbour
Marika Vunibaka	Wing	3 November 1974 (aged 28)	14	(New Zealand) Canterbury
Vilimoni Delasau	Wing	12 July 1977 (aged 26)	14	(France) Stade Montois
Norman Ligairi	Fullback	29 January 1976 (aged 27)	21	(England) Harlequins
Alfred Uluinayau	Fullback	20 February 1970 (aged 33)	29	(Japan) Suntory Sungoliath

=== United States ===
Head coach: Tom Billups

Note: Flags indicate national union for the club/province as defined by World Rugby.

Player	Position	Date of birth (age)	Caps	Club/province
Kirk Khasigian	Hooker	27 April 1977 (aged 26)	33	(United States) Belmont Shore
Matt Wyatt	Hooker	4 March 1978 (aged 25)	3	(United States) OMBAC
Dan Dorsey	Prop	18 January 1976 (aged 27)	16	(Wales) Swansea RFC
Richard Liddington	Prop	30 December 1978 (aged 24)	2	(England) Exeter Chiefs
Mike MacDonald	Prop	27 November 1980 (aged 22)	21	(United States) University of California
John Tarpoff	Prop	5 April 1980 (aged 23)	8	(United States) OMBAC
Jacob Waasdorp	Prop	18 October 1978 (aged 24)	4	(United States) Trinity College
Luke Gross	Lock	21 November 1969 (aged 33)	58	(England) Rotherham
Gerhard Klerck	Lock	6 December 1975 (aged 27)	2	(United States) Gentlemen of Aspen
Alec Parker	Lock	10 April 1974 (aged 29)	35	(United States) Gentlemen of Aspen
Todd Clever	Flanker	16 January 1983 (aged 20)	1	(United States) University of Nevada, Reno
Oloseti Fifita	Flanker	6 December 1968 (aged 34)	16	(United States) Hayward Griffins
Jurie Gouws	Flanker	4 April 1973 (aged 30)	5	(United States) Santa Monica
Dave Hodges (c)	Flanker	15 September 1969 (aged 34)	47	(Wales) Llanelli
Kort Schubert	Number 8	24 July 1979 (aged 24)	27	(United States) Olympic Club
Dan Lyle	Number 8	28 September 1970 (aged 33)	41	(England) Leicester Tigers
Kevin Dalzell	Scrum-half	25 January 1974 (aged 29)	38	(United States) OMBAC
Mose Timoteo	Scrum-half	7 September 1976 (aged 27)	18	(United States) Golden Gate
Kimball Kjar	Scrum-half	23 March 1978 (aged 25)	11	(United States) Brigham Young University
Mike Hercus	Fly-half	5 June 1979 (aged 24)	12	(United States) Belmont Shore
Matt Sherman	Fly-half	29 October 1978 (aged 24)	2	(United States) University of California
Link Wilfley	Fly-half	5 July 1979 (aged 24)	19	(England) Rotherham
Kain Cross	Centre	4 February 1974 (aged 29)	8	(United States) Santa Monica
Philip Eloff	Centre	17 September 1978 (aged 25)	24	(United States) Chicago Lions
Salesi Sika	Centre	7 July 1980 (aged 23)	0	(United States) Brigham Young University
Jason Keyter	Wing	20 December 1973 (aged 29)	15	(England) Rotherham
David Fee	Wing	15 December 1976 (aged 26)	13	(United States) Chicago Lions
Riaan van Zyl	Wing	9 July 1972 (aged 31)	7	(United States) Old Puget Sound Beach
Paul Emerick	Fullback	24 January 1980 (aged 23)	5	(United States) Chicago Lions
John Buchholz	Fullback	26 February 1979 (aged 24)	5	(United States) Olympic Club

=== Japan ===
Head coach: Shogo Mukai

Note: Flags indicate national union for the club/province as defined by World Rugby.

Player	Position	Date of birth (age)	Caps	Club/province
Masao Amino	Hooker	14 October 1974 (aged 28)	7	(Japan) NEC Green Rockets
Masaaki Sakata	Hooker	25 November 1972 (aged 30)	27	(Japan) Suntory Sungoliath
Shin Hasegawa	Prop	31 March 1972 (aged 31)	36	(Japan) Suntory Sungoliath
Masahiko Toyoyama	Prop	18 August 1976 (aged 27)	21	(Japan) Toyota Industries Shuttles
Masahito Yamamoto	Prop	29 May 1978 (aged 25)	10	(Japan) Toyota Verblitz
Ryō Yamamura	Prop	9 August 1981 (aged 22)	5	(Japan) Kanto Gakuin University
Hajime Kiso	Lock	7 November 1978 (aged 24)	7	(Japan) Yamaha Júbilo
Koichi Kubo	Lock	13 January 1976 (aged 27)	15	(Japan) Yamaha Júbilo
Adam Parker	Lock	21 April 1973 (aged 30)	13	(Japan) Toshiba Brave Lupus
Hiroyuki Tanuma	Lock	24 May 1973 (aged 30)	41	(Japan) Suntory Sungoliath
Naoya Okubo	Flanker	27 September 1975 (aged 28)	16	(Japan) Suntory Sungoliath
Ryota Asano	Flanker	25 September 1979 (aged 24)	2	(Japan) NEC Green Rockets
Takuro Miuchi (c)	Flanker	11 December 1975 (aged 27)	11	(Japan) NEC Green Rockets
Yasunori Watanabe	Flanker	2 June 1974 (aged 29)	22	(Japan) Toshiba Brave Lupus
Takahiro Hayano	Flanker	6 September 1974 (aged 29)	0	(Japan) Suntory Sungoliath
Takeomi Ito	Number 8	11 April 1971 (aged 32)	50	(Japan) Kobelco Steelers
Yuya Saito	Number 8	28 April 1977 (aged 26)	12	(France) Colomiers
Yuji Sonoda	Scrum-half	5 July 1973 (aged 30)	14	(Japan) Kobelco Steelers
Takashi Tsuji	Scrum-half	24 April 1977 (aged 26)	0	(Japan) NEC Green Rockets
Keiji Hirose	Fly-half	16 April 1973 (aged 30)	36	(Japan) Toyota Industries Shuttles
Andrew Miller	Fly-half	13 September 1972 (aged 31)	6	(Japan) Kobelco Steelers
George Konia	Centre	9 August 1969 (aged 34)	3	(Japan) NEC Green Rockets
Yukio Motoki	Centre	27 August 1971 (aged 32)	61	(Japan) Kobelco Steelers
Hideki Nanba	Centre	8 July 1976 (aged 27)	23	(Japan) Toyota Industries Shuttles
Reuben Parkinson	Centre	19 July 1973 (aged 30)	3	(Japan) Munakata Sanix Blues
Junichi Hojo	Wing	20 May 1977 (aged 26)	0	(Japan) Suntory Sungoliath
Toru Kurihara	Wing	12 August 1978 (aged 25)	24	(Japan) Suntory Sungoliath
Daisuke Ohata	Wing	11 November 1975 (aged 27)	36	(Japan) Kobelco Steelers
Hirotoki Onozawa	Wing	29 March 1978 (aged 25)	13	(Japan) Suntory Sungoliath
Tsutomu Matsuda	Fullback	30 April 1970 (aged 33)	40	(Japan) Toshiba Brave Lupus
Takashi Yoshida	Fullback	11 May 1975 (aged 28)	4	(Japan) Suntory Sungoliath

== Pool C ==
=== England ===
England announced their 30-man squad for the tournament on 7 September 2003. Danny Grewcock suffered an injury mid-tournament and was replaced by Simon Shaw on 3 November.

Head coach: Clive Woodward

Note: Flags indicate national union for the club/province as defined by World Rugby.

Player	Position	Date of birth (age)	Caps	Club/province
Mark Regan	Hooker	28 January 1972 (aged 31)	26	(England) Leeds Tykes
Steve Thompson	Hooker	15 July 1978 (aged 25)	18	(England) Northampton Saints
Dorian West	Hooker	5 October 1967 (aged 36)	19	(England) Leicester Tigers
Jason Leonard	Prop	14 August 1968 (aged 35)	106	(England) Harlequins
Phil Vickery	Prop	14 March 1976 (aged 27)	31	(England) Gloucester
Julian White	Prop	14 May 1973 (aged 30)	17	(England) Leicester Tigers
Trevor Woodman	Prop	4 August 1976 (aged 27)	10	(England) Gloucester
Martin Johnson (c)	Lock	9 March 1970 (aged 33)	77	(England) Leicester Tigers
Ben Kay	Lock	14 December 1975 (aged 27)	22	(England) Leicester Tigers
Danny Grewcock	Lock	7 November 1972 (aged 30)	42	(England) Bath
Simon Shaw^{1}	Lock	1 September 1973 (aged 30)	23	(England) London Wasps
Neil Back	Flanker	16 January 1969 (aged 34)	60	(England) Leicester Tigers
Richard Hill	Flanker	23 May 1973 (aged 30)	60	(England) Saracens
Lewis Moody	Flanker	12 June 1978 (aged 25)	17	(England) Leicester Tigers
Joe Worsley	Flanker	14 June 1977 (aged 26)	27	(England) London Wasps
Lawrence Dallaglio	Number 8	10 August 1972 (aged 31)	58	(England) London Wasps
Martin Corry	Number 8	12 October 1973 (aged 29)	28	(England) Leicester Tigers
Kyran Bracken	Scrum-half	22 November 1971 (aged 31)	47	(England) Saracens
Matt Dawson	Scrum-half	31 October 1972 (aged 30)	57	(England) Northampton Saints
Andy Gomarsall	Scrum-half	24 July 1974 (aged 29)	13	(England) Gloucester
Paul Grayson	Fly-half	30 May 1971 (aged 32)	27	(England) Northampton Saints
Jonny Wilkinson	Fly-half	25 May 1979 (aged 24)	46	(England) Newcastle Falcons
Stuart Abbott	Centre	3 June 1978 (aged 25)	2	(England) London Wasps
Will Greenwood	Centre	20 October 1972 (aged 30)	41	(England) Harlequins
Mike Catt	Centre	17 September 1971 (aged 32)	61	(England) Bath
Mike Tindall	Centre	18 October 1978 (aged 24)	27	(England) Bath
Ben Cohen	Wing	14 September 1978 (aged 25)	57	(England) Northampton Saints
Dan Luger	Wing	11 January 1975 (aged 28)	34	(France) Perpignan
Jason Robinson	Wing	30 July 1974 (aged 29)	21	(England) Sale Sharks
Josh Lewsey	Fullback	30 November 1976 (aged 26)	13	(England) London Wasps
Iain Balshaw	Fullback	14 April 1979 (aged 24)	16	(England) Bath

=== South Africa ===
Head coach: Rudolf Straeuli

Note: Flags indicate national union for the club/province as defined by World Rugby.

Player	Position	Date of birth (age)	Caps	Club/province
Dale Santon	Hooker	18 August 1969 (aged 34)	1	(South Africa) SWD Eagles
Danie Coetzee	Hooker	2 September 1977 (aged 26)	8	(South Africa) Bulls
John Smit	Hooker	3 April 1978 (aged 25)	21	(South Africa) Sharks
Richard Bands	Prop	25 March 1974 (aged 29)	7	(South Africa) Bulls
Christo Bezuidenhout	Prop	14 May 1970 (aged 33)	3	(South Africa) Pumas
Faan Rautenbach	Prop	22 February 1976 (aged 27)	8	(South Africa) Western Province
Lawrence Sephaka	Prop	8 August 1978 (aged 25)	13	(South Africa) Cats
Selborne Boome	Lock	16 April 1975 (aged 28)	17	(South Africa) Western Province
Bakkies Botha	Lock	22 September 1979 (aged 24)	6	(South Africa) Bulls
Victor Matfield	Lock	11 May 1977 (aged 26)	20	(South Africa) Bulls
Danie Rossouw	Lock	6 May 1978 (aged 25)	0	(South Africa) Bulls
Schalk Burger	Flanker	13 April 1983 (aged 20)	0	(South Africa) Western Province
Corné Krige (c)	Flanker	21 March 1975 (aged 28)	36	(South Africa) Western Province
Hendro Scholtz	Flanker	22 March 1979 (aged 24)	3	(South Africa) Cats
Joe van Niekerk	Number 8	4 May 1980 (aged 23)	19	(South Africa) Cats
Juan Smith	Number 8	30 July 1981 (aged 22)	6	(South Africa) Cats
Joost van der Westhuizen	Scrum-half	20 February 1971 (aged 32)	85	(South Africa) Bulls
Neil de Kock	Scrum-half	20 November 1978 (aged 24)	7	(South Africa) Western Province
Derick Hougaard	Fly-half	4 January 1983 (aged 20)	0	(South Africa) Bulls
Louis Koen	Fly-half	7 July 1975 (aged 28)	11	(South Africa) Cats
Jaco van der Westhuyzen	Fly-half	6 April 1978 (aged 25)	6	(South Africa) Bulls
Stefan Terblanche	Centre	2 June 1975 (aged 28)	36	(South Africa) Sharks
De Wet Barry	Centre	24 June 1978 (aged 25)	19	(South Africa) Western Province
Jaque Fourie	Centre	4 March 1984 (aged 19)	0	(South Africa) Cats
Jorrie Muller	Wing	1 March 1981 (aged 22)	2	(South Africa) Cats
Ashwin Willemse	Wing	8 September 1981 (aged 22)	5	(South Africa) Cats
Breyton Paulse	Wing	25 April 1976 (aged 27)	39	(South Africa) Western Province
Werner Greeff	Wing	14 July 1977 (aged 26)	7	(South Africa) Western Province
Thinus Delport	Fullback	2 February 1975 (aged 28)	12	(England) Gloucester
Ricardo Loubscher	Fullback	11 June 1974 (aged 29)	2	(South Africa) Sharks

=== Samoa ===
Head coach: (New Zealand) John Boe

Note: Flags indicate national union for the club/province as defined by World Rugby.

Player	Position	Date of birth (age)	Caps	Club/province
Jonathan Meredith	Hooker	8 July 1978 (aged 25)	9	(New Zealand) Auckland
Mahonri Schwalger	Hooker	15 September 1978 (aged 25)	4	(New Zealand) Hawke's Bay
Simon Lemalu	Prop	23 January 1981 (aged 22)	0	(New Zealand) Otahuhu RFC
Kas Lealamanua	Prop	15 September 1976 (aged 27)	17	(New Zealand) Wellington
Tamato Leupolu	Prop	7 December 1980 (aged 22)	9	(New Zealand) Auckland
Jeremy Tomuli	Prop	13 October 1971 (aged 31)	9	(France) Colomiers
Leo Lafaiali'i	Lock	30 January 1974 (aged 29)	11	(Japan) Sanyo Wild Knights
Opeta Palepoi	Lock	2 December 1975 (aged 27)	32	(England) Exeter Chiefs
Michael von Dincklage	Lock	21 June 1978 (aged 25)	0	(New Zealand) Waitemata
Maurie Fa'asavalu	Flanker	12 January 1980 (aged 23)	3	(Samoa) Marist St. Joseph
Des Tuiavi'i	Flanker	14 January 1970 (aged 33)	2	(England) Rotherham
Patrick Segi	Flanker	21 September 1980 (aged 22)	11	(New Zealand) Auckland
Siaosi Vaili	Flanker	7 September 1977 (aged 26)	6	(England) Exeter Chiefs
Peter Poulos	Flanker	7 July 1977 (aged 26)	0	(Japan) NTT DoCoMo Red Hurricanes
Semo Sititi	Number 8	6 March 1974 (aged 29)	27	(Scotland) Border Reivers
Kitiona Viliamu	Number 8	7 June 1977 (aged 26)	5	(New Zealand) Counties Manukau
Henry Tuilagi	Number 8	12 August 1976 (aged 27)	4	(England) Leicester Tigers
John Senio	Scrum-half	10 September 1982 (aged 21)	0	(New Zealand) Waitemata
Steven So'oialo	Scrum-half	11 May 1977 (aged 26)	24	(England) Orrell
Denning Tyrell	Scrum-half	9 May 1976 (aged 27)	9	(New Zealand) Taranaki
Tanner Vili	Fly-half	13 May 1976 (aged 27)	16	(Scotland) Borders Reivers
Fa'atonu Fili	Fly-half	31 August 1981 (aged 22)	2	(New Zealand) Wellington
Terry Fanolua	Centre	3 July 1974 (aged 29)	22	(England) Gloucester
Brian Lima	Centre	25 January 1972 (aged 31)	49	(Japan) Secom Rugguts
Dale Rasmussen	Centre	5 July 1977 (aged 26)	2	(New Zealand) Ponsonby RFC
Romi Ropati	Wing	20 June 1976 (aged 27)	0	(Japan) Toyota Verblitz
Lome Fa'atau	Wing	23 October 1975 (aged 27)	13	(New Zealand) Hurricanes
Ron Fanuatanu	Wing	7 July 1982 (aged 21)	1	(Samoa) Marist St. Joseph
Sailosi Tagicakibau	Wing	14 November 1982 (aged 20)	1	(New Zealand) Papakura
Dominic Fe'aunati	Wing	14 June 1978 (aged 25)	0	(New Zealand) Wellington
Earl Va'a	Fullback	1 May 1972 (aged 31)	24	(New Zealand) Wellington

=== Uruguay ===
Head Coach: Diego Ormaechea

Lock Leonardo de Oliveira was replaced by José Viana on 24 September 2003, due to a back injury.

Note: Flags indicate national union for the club/province as defined by World Rugby.

Player	Position	Date of birth (age)	Caps	Club/province
Diego Lamelas	Hooker	14 November 1972 (aged 30)	41	(Argentina) Asociación Alumni
Juan Andrés Pérez	Hooker	26 August 1975 (aged 28)	15	(Uruguay) Old Boys
Eduardo Berruti	Prop	15 March 1968 (aged 35)	43	(Uruguay) Old Christians Club
Pablo Lemoine	Prop	1 March 1975 (aged 28)	32	(France) Stade Français
Juan Machado	Prop	23 July 1973 (aged 30)	25	(Uruguay) Carrasco Polo Club
Rodrigo Sánchez	Prop	25 October 1976 (aged 26)	40	(Uruguay) Carrasco Polo Club
Guillermo Storace	Prop	20 March 1974 (aged 29)	33	(Uruguay) Old Christians Club
Juan Álvarez	Lock	8 July 1980 (aged 23)	10	(Uruguay) Carrasco Polo Club
Juan Alzueta	Lock	9 September 1975 (aged 28)	28	(Uruguay) Trébol Paysandú
Juan Carlos Bado	Lock	29 December 1973 (aged 29)	41	(France) Stade Français
Marcelo Gutierrez	Lock	10 August 1977 (aged 26)	17	(Uruguay) Old Christians Club
Nicolas Brignoni	Flanker	3 September 1976 (aged 27)	34	(Italy) L'Aquila
Ignacio Conti	Flanker	5 September 1977 (aged 26)	8	(Uruguay) Carrasco Polo Club
Nicolas Grille	Flanker	13 December 1974 (aged 28)	38	(Uruguay) Trébol Paysandú
Hernan Ponte	Flanker	2 January 1981 (aged 22)	15	(Uruguay) Carrasco Polo Club
Rodrigo Capo Ortega	Number 8	8 December 1980 (aged 22)	20	(France) Castres
Emiliano Caffera	Scrum-half	30 October 1978 (aged 24)	19	(Uruguay) Club Champagnat
Juan Campomar	Scrum-half	10 March 1982 (aged 21)	4	(Uruguay) Old Boys
Bernardo Amarillo	Fly-half	14 January 1978 (aged 25)	21	(Uruguay) Carrasco Polo Club
Sebastián Aguirre	Fly-half	15 July 1976 (aged 27)	28	(Uruguay) Carrasco Polo Club
Diego Aguirre (c)	Centre	23 September 1974 (aged 28)	46	(Uruguay) Carrasco Polo Club
Joaquín de Freitas	Centre	21 April 1978 (aged 25)	17	(Uruguay) Club Champagnat Rugby
Martín Mendaro	Centre	1 August 1973 (aged 30)	44	(Uruguay) Carrasco Polo Club
Joaquin Pastore	Centre	8 December 1981 (aged 21)	7	(Uruguay) Old Boys
Carlos Baldassari	Wing	15 March 1979 (aged 24)	2	(Uruguay) Club Champagnat Rugby
Alfonso Cardoso	Wing	27 December 1971 (aged 31)	36	(Uruguay) Old Boys
Emiliano Ibarra	Wing	10 March 1974 (aged 29)	22	(Uruguay) Carrasco Polo Club
José Viana	Wing	2 September 1977 (aged 26)	12	(Uruguay) Old Boys
Juan Menchaca	Fullback	23 July 1977 (aged 26)	28	(Uruguay) Carrasco Polo Club
Diego Reyes	Fullback	24 September 1980 (aged 22)	5	(Uruguay) Carrasco Polo Club

=== Georgia ===
Head coach: (France) Claude Saurel

Note: Flags indicate national union for the club/province as defined by World Rugby.

Player	Position	Date of birth (age)	Caps	Club/province
Akvsenti Giorgadze	Hooker	4 June 1976 (aged 27)	31	(Italy) Rovigo
David Dadunashvili	Hooker	27 January 1982 (aged 21)	1	(France) RC Nîmes
Aleko Margvelashvili	Prop	5 June 1975 (aged 28)	1	unknown
Soso Nikolaenko	Prop	18 May 1975 (aged 28)	11	unknown
Goderdzi Shvelidze	Prop	17 April 1978 (aged 25)	24	(France) Béziers
Avto Kopaliani	Prop	13 June 1982 (aged 21)	1	(France) US Montauban
Victor Didebulidze	Lock	4 November 1971 (aged 31)	28	(France) RC Nîmes
Sergo Gujaraidze	Lock	23 August 1979 (aged 24)	0	unknown
Zurab Mtchedlishvili	Lock	22 October 1971 (aged 31)	32	(France) SC Albi
Vano Nadiradze	Lock	23 February 1972 (aged 31)	32	unknown
David Bolgashvili	Flanker	19 September 1979 (aged 23)	20	unknown
Gia Labadze	Flanker	21 September 1973 (aged 29)	33	(France) Toulon
George Tsiklauri	Flanker	9 September 1981 (aged 22)	0	unknown
Grégoire Yachvili	Flanker	30 May 1977 (aged 26)	9	(France) Stade Bordelais
Giorgi Chkhaidze	Number 8	20 August 1981 (aged 22)	7	(France) RC Massy
Ilia Zedginidze (c)	Number 8	30 May 1977 (aged 26)	9	(Italy) Rovigo
Irakli Abuseridze	Scrum-half	25 November 1977 (aged 25)	22	(France) Aurillac
Irakli Modebadze	Scrum-half	22 November 1979 (aged 23)	1	unknown
Paliko Jimsheladze	Fly-half	8 July 1975 (aged 28)	38	(France) Aurillac
Merab Kvirikashvili	Fly-half	27 December 1983 (aged 19)	3	(Georgia (country)) Lelo Saracens
Otar Eloshvili	Centre	15 November 1978 (aged 24)	1	(France) Compiègne
Irakli Giorgadze	Centre	17 December 1982 (aged 20)	7	(France) Bourgoin
Vasil Katsadze	Centre	16 July 1976 (aged 27)	28	(France) Grenoble
Tedo Zibzibadze	Centre	6 August 1980 (aged 23)	24	(France) Gourdon XV
Archil Kavtarashvili	Wing	16 March 1973 (aged 30)	0	unknown
Badri Khekhelashvili	Wing	15 February 1978 (aged 25)	23	unknown
Gocha Khonelidze	Wing	2 February 1976 (aged 27)	1	unknown
Malkhaz Urjukashvili	Wing	24 September 1980 (aged 22)	28	(France) Rugby Club Cannes Mandelieu
Irakli Machkhaneli	Fullback	16 July 1976 (aged 27)	28	(Georgia (country)) RC Armazi Tbilisi
Bessik Khamashuridze	Fullback	14 August 1977 (aged 26)	29	(France) Rugby Club Cannes Mandelieu

== Pool D ==
=== New Zealand ===
Head coach: John Mitchell

^{1} Ben Atiga replaced Ben Blair following a mid-tournament injury.

Note: Flags indicate national union for the club/province as defined by World Rugby.

Player	Position	Date of birth (age)	Caps	Club/province
Corey Flynn	Hooker	5 January 1981 (aged 22)	0	(New Zealand) Crusaders / Canterbury
Mark Hammett	Hooker	13 July 1972 (aged 31)	24	(New Zealand) Crusaders / Canterbury
Keven Mealamu	Hooker	20 March 1979 (aged 24)	8	(New Zealand) Blues / Auckland
Dave Hewett	Prop	14 July 1971 (aged 32)	16	(New Zealand) Crusaders / Canterbury
Carl Hoeft	Prop	13 November 1974 (aged 28)	28	(New Zealand) Highlanders / Otago
Kees Meeuws	Prop	26 July 1974 (aged 29)	29	(New Zealand) Blues / Auckland
Greg Somerville	Prop	28 November 1977 (aged 25)	28	(New Zealand) Crusaders / Canterbury
Chris Jack	Lock	5 September 1978 (aged 25)	20	(New Zealand) Crusaders / Canterbury
Brad Thorn	Lock	3 February 1975 (aged 28)	5	(New Zealand) Crusaders / Canterbury
Ali Williams	Lock	30 April 1981 (aged 22)	10	(New Zealand) Blues / Auckland
Daniel Braid	Flanker	23 February 1981 (aged 22)	1	(New Zealand) Blues / Auckland
Marty Holah	Flanker	10 September 1978 (aged 25)	17	(New Zealand) Chiefs / Waikato
Richie McCaw	Flanker	31 December 1980 (aged 22)	14	(New Zealand) Crusaders / Canterbury
Reuben Thorne (c)	Flanker	2 January 1975 (aged 28)	34	(New Zealand) Crusaders / Canterbury
Jerry Collins	Flanker	4 November 1980 (aged 22)	8	(New Zealand) Hurricanes / Wellington
Rodney So'oialo	Number 8	3 October 1979 (aged 24)	3	(New Zealand) Hurricanes / Wellington
Steve Devine	Scrum-half	21 December 1976 (aged 26)	8	(New Zealand) Blues / Auckland
Byron Kelleher	Scrum-half	3 December 1976 (aged 26)	24	(New Zealand) Highlanders / Otago
Justin Marshall	Scrum-half	5 August 1973 (aged 30)	65	(New Zealand) Crusaders / Canterbury
Dan Carter	Fly-half	5 March 1982 (aged 21)	3	(New Zealand) Crusaders / Canterbury
Carlos Spencer	Fly-half	14 October 1975 (aged 27)	22	(New Zealand) Blues / Auckland
Leon MacDonald	Fly-half	21 December 1977 (aged 25)	19	(New Zealand) Crusaders / Canterbury
Aaron Mauger	Centre	29 November 1980 (aged 22)	15	(New Zealand) Crusaders / Canterbury
Ben Atiga^{1}	Centre	5 May 1983 (aged 20)	0	(New Zealand) Auckland
Tana Umaga	Centre	27 May 1973 (aged 30)	54	(New Zealand) Hurricanes / Wellington
Ma'a Nonu	Centre	21 May 1982 (aged 21)	1	(New Zealand) Hurricanes / Wellington
Caleb Ralph	Wing	10 September 1977 (aged 26)	10	(New Zealand) Crusaders / Canterbury
Joe Rokocoko	Wing	6 June 1983 (aged 20)	7	(New Zealand) Blues / Auckland
Doug Howlett	Wing	21 September 1978 (aged 25)	31	(New Zealand) Blues / Auckland
Ben Blair	Fullback	26 March 1979 (aged 24)	4	(New Zealand) Crusaders / Canterbury
Mils Muliaina	Fullback	30 July 1980 (aged 23)	7	(New Zealand) Blues / Auckland

=== Wales ===
Head coach: (New Zealand) Steve Hansen

Note: Flags indicate national union for the club/province as defined by World Rugby.

Player	Position	Date of birth (age)	Caps	Club/province
Huw Bennett	Hooker	11 June 1983 (aged 20)	2	(Wales) Ospreys
Mefin Davies	Hooker	2 September 1972 (aged 31)	11	(Wales) Celtic Warriors
Robin McBryde	Hooker	3 July 1970 (aged 33)	26	(Wales) Scarlets
Paul James	Prop	13 May 1982 (aged 21)	1	(Wales) Ospreys
Gethin Jenkins	Prop	17 November 1980 (aged 22)	10	(Wales) Celtic Warriors
Adam Jones	Prop	8 March 1981 (aged 22)	2	(Wales) Ospreys
Iestyn Thomas	Prop	15 December 1976 (aged 26)	25	(Wales) Scarlets
Brent Cockbain	Lock	15 November 1974 (aged 28)	1	(Wales) Celtic Warriors
Gareth Llewellyn	Lock	27 February 1969 (aged 34)	79	(Wales) Ospreys
Robert Sidoli	Lock	21 June 1979 (aged 24)	13	(Wales) Celtic Warriors
Chris Wyatt	Lock	10 June 1973 (aged 30)	36	(Wales) Scarlets
Colin Charvis (c)	Loose forward	27 December 1972 (aged 30)	59	(France) Tarbes
Dafydd Jones	Loose forward	24 June 1979 (aged 24)	10	(Wales) Scarlets
Jonathan Thomas	Loose forward	27 December 1982 (aged 20)	4	(Wales) Ospreys
Martyn Williams	Loose forward	1 September 1975 (aged 28)	36	(Wales) Cardiff Blues
Alix Popham	Loose forward	17 October 1979 (aged 23)	4	(England) Leeds Tykes
Gareth Cooper	Scrum-half	7 May 1979 (aged 24)	10	(Wales) Celtic Warriors
Dwayne Peel	Scrum-half	31 August 1981 (aged 22)	21	(Wales) Scarlets
Stephen Jones	Fly-half	8 December 1977 (aged 25)	31	(Wales) Scarlets
Ceri Sweeney	Fly-half	21 January 1980 (aged 23)	5	(Wales) Celtic Warriors
Iestyn Harris	Centre	25 June 1976 (aged 27)	17	(Wales) Cardiff Blues
Sonny Parker	Centre	27 August 1977 (aged 26)	5	(Wales) Celtic Warriors
Tom Shanklin	Centre	24 November 1979 (aged 23)	15	(Wales) Cardiff Blues
Mark Taylor	Centre	27 February 1973 (aged 30)	40	(Wales) Scarlets
Mark Jones	Wing	7 November 1979 (aged 23)	12	(Wales) Scarlets
Gareth Thomas	Wing	25 July 1974 (aged 29)	68	(Wales) Celtic Warriors
Kevin Morgan	Wing	23 February 1977 (aged 26)	24	(Wales) Celtic Warriors
Shane Williams	Wing	26 February 1977 (aged 26)	11	(Wales) Ospreys
Garan Evans	Fullback	16 February 1973 (aged 30)	3	(Wales) Scarlets
Rhys Williams	Fullback	23 February 1980 (aged 23)	30	(Wales) Cardiff Blues

=== Italy ===
Head coach: (New Zealand) John Kirwan

Note: Flags indicate national union for the club/province as defined by World Rugby.

Player	Position	Date of birth (age)	Caps	Club/province
Carlo Festuccia	Hooker	20 June 1980 (aged 23)	8	(Italy) Parma
Fabio Ongaro	Hooker	23 September 1977 (aged 26)	12	(Italy) Benetton Treviso
Martin Castrogiovanni	Prop	21 October 1981 (aged 21)	11	(Italy) Calvisano
Andrea Lo Cicero	Prop	7 May 1976 (aged 27)	26	(France) Toulouse
Ramiro Martínez	Prop	23 October 1970 (aged 32)	9	(Italy) Benetton Treviso
Salvatore Perugini	Prop	6 March 1978 (aged 25)	15	(Italy) Calvisano
Cristian Bezzi	Lock	13 May 1975 (aged 28)	6	(Italy) Viadana
Marco Bortolami	Lock	12 June 1980 (aged 23)	20	(Italy) Petrarca
Carlo Checchinato	Lock	30 August 1970 (aged 33)	76	(Italy) Benetton Treviso
Santiago Dellapè	Lock	9 May 1978 (aged 25)	11	(Italy) Benetton Treviso
Andrea Benatti	Flanker	8 November 1979 (aged 23)	4	(Italy) Aironi
Mauro Bergamasco	Flanker	1 May 1979 (aged 24)	32	(France) Stade Français
Andrea de Rossi	Flanker	7 August 1972 (aged 31)	25	(Italy) Calvisano
Scott Palmer	Flanker	10 November 1977 (aged 25)	7	(Italy) Benetton Treviso
Aaron Persico	Flanker	29 March 1978 (aged 25)	33	(England) Leeds Tykes
Sergio Parisse	Number 8	12 September 1983 (aged 20)	8	(Italy) Benetton Treviso
Matthew Phillips	Number 8	10 April 1975 (aged 28)	12	(Italy) Viadana
Matteo Mazzantini	Scrum-half	24 October 1976 (aged 26)	7	(Italy) Viadana
Alessandro Troncon (c)	Scrum-half	6 September 1973 (aged 30)	79	(Italy) Benetton Treviso
Francesco Mazzariol	Fly-half	1 March 1975 (aged 28)	29	(Italy) Benetton Treviso
Rima Wakarua	Fly-half	23 March 1976 (aged 27)	0	(Italy) Rugby Leonessa 1928
Matteo Barbini	Centre	8 June 1982 (aged 21)	5	(Italy) Benetton Treviso
Manuel Dallan	Centre	15 October 1976 (aged 26)	13	(Italy) Venezia
Cristian Stoica	Centre	1 August 1976 (aged 27)	52	(France) Montpellier
Gonzalo Canale	Centre	1 November 1982 (aged 20)	2	(Italy) Benetton Treviso
Denis Dallan	Wing	4 March 1978 (aged 25)	30	(Italy) Benetton Treviso
Nicola Mazzucato	Wing	27 October 1975 (aged 27)	29	(Italy) Calvisano
Mirco Bergamasco	Wing	23 February 1983 (aged 20)	12	(France) Stade Français
Gert Peens	Fullback	22 March 1974 (aged 29)	14	(Italy) L'Aquila
Andrea Masi	Fullback	30 March 1981 (aged 22)	6	(Italy) Viadana

=== Canada ===
Head coach: (Australia) David Clark

Note: Flags indicate national union for the club/province as defined by World Rugby.

Player	Position	Date of birth (age)	Caps	Club/province
Aaron Abrams	Hooker	9 July 1979 (aged 24)	1	(Canada) Castaway Wanderers
Mark Lawson	Hooker	17 March 1980 (aged 23)	13	(Canada) Victoria Vikes
Garth Cooke	Prop	18 April 1977 (aged 26)	11	(France) Stade Aurillacois Cantal Auvergne
Rod Snow	Prop	1 May 1970 (aged 33)	50	(Wales) Dragons
Jon Thiel	Prop	31 May 1975 (aged 28)	34	(Wales) Scarlets
Kevin Tkachuk	Prop	11 September 1976 (aged 27)	20	(England) Pertemps Bees
Jamie Cudmore	Lock	6 September 1978 (aged 25)	6	(Wales) Llandovery
Mike James	Lock	21 July 1973 (aged 30)	47	(France) Stade Français
Ed Knaggs	Lock	20 July 1973 (aged 30)	18	(Canada) Castaway Wanderers
Colin Yukes	Lock	23 October 1979 (aged 23)	13	(France) Agen
Jim Douglas	Flanker	7 March 1977 (aged 26)	5	(Canada) UBC Old Boys Ravens
Adam van Staveren	Flanker	28 September 1975 (aged 28)	17	(Canada) Bayside Sharks
Ryan Banks	Flanker	2 February 1972 (aged 31)	34	(Canada) Burnaby Lake Rugby Club
Al Charron (c)	Flanker	27 June 1966 (aged 37)	73	(France) Pau
Jeff Reid	Number 8	15 August 1974 (aged 29)	3	(Australia) Eastwood Rugby Club
Josh Jackson	Number 8	2 October 1980 (aged 23)	3	(Canada) Castaway Wanderers
Ed Fairhurst	Scrum-half	7 May 1979 (aged 24)	13	(Canada) Castaway Wanderers
Morgan Williams	Scrum-half	17 April 1976 (aged 27)	31	(England) Saracens
Jared Barker	Fly-half	10 January 1975 (aged 28)	12	(England) Saracens
Bobby Ross	Fly-half	29 August 1969 (aged 34)	56	(Canada) James Bay Athletic Association
John Cannon	Centre	18 August 1980 (aged 23)	21	(England) Doncaster Knights
Nik Witkowski	Centre	2 June 1976 (aged 27)	28	(England) Coventry
Marco Di Girolamo	Centre	9 May 1977 (aged 26)	13	(Canada) James Bay Athletic Association
Ryan Smith	Centre	13 September 1979 (aged 24)	6	(Canada) Brampton Beavers
Dave Lougheed	Wing	11 April 1968 (aged 35)	32	(Canada) Balmy Beach
Matt King	Wing	7 April 1980 (aged 23)	4	(Canada) Balmy Beach
Sean Fauth	Wing	8 February 1975 (aged 28)	27	(Canada) Castaway Wanderers
Winston Stanley	Wing	17 July 1974 (aged 29)	63	(England) Leeds Tykes
James Pritchard	Fullback	21 July 1979 (aged 24)	5	(England) Bedford Blues
Quentin Fyffe	Fullback	15 February 1972 (aged 31)	2	(Canada) James Bay Athletic Association

=== Tonga ===
Head coach: (New Zealand) Jim Love

Note: Flags indicate national union for the club/province as defined by World Rugby.

Player	Position	Date of birth (age)	Caps	Club/province
Viliami Maʻasi	Hooker	31 July 1975 (aged 28)	18	(England) Penzance
Ephraim Taukafa	Hooker	26 June 1976 (aged 27)	8	(New Zealand) North Harbour
Heamani Lavaka	Prop	10 January 1969 (aged 34)	11	(Australia) Eastern Suburbs
Tonga Leaʻaetoa	Prop	4 March 1977 (aged 26)	6	(Australia) Northern Suburbs
Kisi Pulu	Prop	31 January 1978 (aged 25)	7	(New Zealand) Auckland
Kafalosi Tonga	Prop	30 April 1975 (aged 28)	1	none
Sione Tuʻamoheloa	Prop	20 August 1980 (aged 23)	2	(New Zealand) North Harbour
Milton Ngauamo	Lock	25 May 1976 (aged 27)	7	(New Zealand) Wellington
Viliami Vaki	Lock	27 April 1976 (aged 27)	16	(Italy) Parma
Inoke Afeaki (c)	Lock	12 July 1973 (aged 30)	16	(Japan) Secom Rugguts
Benhur Kivalu	Lock	2 September 1972 (aged 31)	30	(Japan) Kintetsu Liners
Stanley Afeaki	Flanker	12 November 1978 (aged 24)	10	(New Zealand) Auckland
Ipolito Fenukitau	Flanker	22 July 1972 (aged 31)	14	(Japan) Ricoh Black Rams
Edward Langi	Flanker	12 November 1978 (aged 24)	0	none
Usaia Latu	Flanker	21 January 1978 (aged 25)	8	(Australia) Northern Suburbs
Nisifolo Naufahu	Number 8	30 October 1977 (aged 25)	14	(New Zealand) Northland
Sililo Martens	Scrum-half	27 April 1977 (aged 26)	23	(Wales) Bridgend Ravens
Tony Alatini	Scrum-half	21 August 1974 (aged 29)	8	(Wales) Blackwood
David Palu	Scrum-half	6 November 1981 (aged 21)	7	(New Zealand) Horowhenua-Kapiti
Pierre Hola	Fly-half	9 June 1978 (aged 25)	16	(Japan) Kobe Steel
Suka Hufanga	Centre	18 June 1982 (aged 21)	1	(Tonga) Vaini
Gus Leger	Centre	12 October 1974 (aged 28)	12	(New Zealand) Counties Manukau
Johnny Ngauamo	Centre	20 July 1969 (aged 34)	4	(France) Clermont
John Payne	Centre	1 February 1980 (aged 23)	7	(Australia) Manly
Tevita Tuʻifua	Wing	15 October 1975 (aged 27)	1	(New Zealand) Auckland
Pila Fifita	Wing	13 June 1975 (aged 28)	0	(New Zealand) North Otago
Sione Fonua	Wing	19 August 1980 (aged 23)	2	(New Zealand) Auckland
Sila Vaʻenuku	Wing	21 July 1978 (aged 25)	1	(Tonga) Toa-ko-Ma'afu
Sateki Tuipulotu	Fullback	3 July 1971 (aged 32)	18	(England) Worcester Warriors
Lisiate Ulufonua	Fullback	3 July 1971 (aged 32)	4	(Tonga) Lavengamalie
