= 2003 Scotland rugby union tour of South Africa =

Scotland rugby union tour

Summary
P	W	D	L
Total
2	0	0	2
Test match
2	0	0	2
Opponent
P	W	D	L
South Africa
2	0	0	2

The 2003 Scotland rugby union tour of South Africa was a short series of matches played in June 2003 in South Africa by Scotland national rugby union team.

== Results ==
7 June 2003

South Africa	29–25	Scotland
Try: Halstead, Terblanche; Con: Koen 2 Pen: Koen 5		Try: Craig, Paterson, White; Con: Paterson 2 Pen: Paterson 2

Kings Park Stadium, Durban
Attendance: 37,000
Referee: Joël Jutge (France)

South Africa: 15. Ricardo Loubscher, 14. Stefan Terblanche, 13. André Snyman, 12. Trevor Halstead, 11. Ashwin Willemse, 10. Louis Koen, 9. Joost van der Westhuizen (c), 8. Lawrence Sephaka, 7. Danie Coetzee, 6. Richard Bands, 5. Bakkies Botha, 4. Hendrik Gerber, 3. Victor Matfield, 2. Wikus van Heerden, 1. Pedrie Wannenburg – Replacements: 20. Robbi Kempson, 21. Cobus Visagie, 22. Selborne Boome, 19. Juan Smith, 17. Jaco van der Westhuyzen – Unused: 16. Craig Davidson, 18. Gcobani Bobo
Scotland: 15. Glenn Metcalfe, 14. Chris Paterson, 13. Andy Craig, 12. Andrew Henderson, 11. Kenny Logan, 10. Gregor Townsend, 9. Bryan Redpath (c), 8. Simon Taylor, 7. Andrew Mower, 6. Jason White, 5. Nathan Hines, 4. Scott Murray, 3. Bruce Douglas, 2. Gordon Bulloch, 1. Gavin Kerr – Replacements: 16. Robbie Russell, 18. Jon Petrie, 19. Martin Leslie, 22. James McLaren – Unused: 17. Gordon McIlwham, 20. Mike Blair, 21. Gordon Ross

14 June 2003

South Africa	28–19	Scotland
Try: Terblanche; Con: Koen; Pen: Koen 6 Drop: Koen		Try: Craig; Con: Paterson; Pen: Paterson 4

Ellis Park Stadium, Johannesburg
Attendance: 55,000
Referee: Scott Young (Australia)

South Africa: 15. Jaco van der Westhuyzen, 14. Stefan Terblanche, 13. Marius Joubert, 12. Trevor Halstead, 11. Ashwin Willemse, 10. Louis Koen, 9. Joost van der Westhuizen (c), 8. Lawrence Sephaka, 7. Danie Coetzee, 6. Richard Bands, 5. Bakkies Botha, 4. Hendrik Gerber, 3. Victor Matfield, 2. Wikus van Heerden, 1. Pedrie Wannenburg – Replacements: 16. Robbi Kempson (yellow card) , 17. Cobus Visagie, 18. Selborne Boome, 19. Juan Smith, 21. Gcobani Bobo – Unused: 20. Craig Davidson, 22. Brent Russell
Scotland: 15. Glenn Metcalfe, 14. Chris Paterson, 13. Andy Craig, 12. Andrew Henderson, 11. Kenny Logan, 10. Gregor Townsend, 9. Bryan Redpath (c), 8. Simon Taylor, 7. Andrew Mower, 6. Jason White, 5. Nathan Hines, 4. Scott Murray, 3. Bruce Douglas, 2. Gordon Bulloch, 1. Gavin Kerr – Replacements: 16. Robbie Russell, 17. Gordon McIlwham, 18. Jon Petrie, 19. Martin Leslie, 20. Mike Blair, 21. Gordon Ross, 22. Brendan Laney
