= 2003 Tri Nations Series =

Final positions
- Champions: New Zealand (5th title)
- Bledisloe Cup: New Zealand

Tournament statistics
- Matches played: 6
- Tries scored: 33 (5.5 per match)
- Attendance: 307,162 (51,194 per match)

The 2003 Tri Nations Series was contested from 12 July to 16 August between the national rugby union teams of Australia, New Zealand and South Africa. New Zealand won the tournament for the fifth time.

New Zealand regained the Bledisloe Cup which Australia had held since 1998.

== Table ==
Nation	Games				Points			Bonus points	Table points
Nation	Played	Won	Drawn	Lost	For	Against	Difference	Bonus points	Table points
New Zealand	4	4	0	0	142	65	+77	2	18
Australia	4	1	0	3	89	106	−17	2	6
South Africa	4	1	0	3	62	122	−60	0	4

== Results ==
=== Round 1 ===
12 July 2003
15:00 SAST (UTC+02)

South Africa	26–22	Australia (1 BP)
Try: Matfield; Russell; Con: Koen (2); Pen: Koen (4)		Try: Sailor; Roff; Waugh; Con: Burke (2); Drop: Burke

Newlands Stadium, Cape Town
Attendance: 48,678
Referee: Steve Walsh (New Zealand)

FB	15	Jaco van der Westhuyzen
RW	14	Stefan Terblanche
OC	13	Marius Joubert
IC	12	De Wet Barry
LW	11	Thinus Delport
FH	10	Louis Koen
SH	9	Joost van der Westhuizen
N8	8	Juan Smith
BF	7	Wikus van Heerden
OF	6	Corné Krige (c)
RL	5	Victor Matfield
LL	4	Bakkies Botha
TP	3	Richard Bands
HK	2	Danie Coetzee
LP	1	Lawrence Sephaka
Replacements:
HK	16	Dale Santon
PR	17	Robbi Kempson
LK	18	Selborne Boome
FL	19	Pedrie Wannenburg
SH	20	Craig Davidson
CE	21	Gcobani Bobo
WG	22	Brent Russell
Coach:
Rudolf Straeuli

FB	15	Matt Burke
RW	14	Wendell Sailor
OC	13	Mat Rogers
IC	12	Steve Kefu
LW	11	Joe Roff
FH	10	Elton Flatley
SH	9	George Gregan (c)
N8	8	Toutai Kefu
OF	7	Phil Waugh
BF	6	David Lyons
RL	5	Dan Vickerman
LL	4	David Giffin
TP	3	Patricio Noriega
HK	2	Brendan Cannon
LP	1	Bill Young
Replacements:
HK	16	Adam Freier
PR	17	Ben Darwin
LK	18	Nathan Sharpe
N8	19	Owen Finegan
SH	20	Chris Whitaker
FH	21	Stephen Larkham
WG	22	Lote Tuqiri
Coach:
Eddie Jones

=== Round 2 ===
19 July 2003
15:00 SAST (UTC+02)

South Africa	16–52	New Zealand (1 BP)
Try: Willemse; Con: Koen; Pen: Koen (2); Drop: Koen		Try: Howlett (2); Mauger; Meeuws; Rokocoko (2); Spencer; Con: Spencer (4); Pen: Spencer (3)

Loftus Versfeld, Pretoria
Attendance: 50,000
Referee: Alain Rolland (Ireland)

FB	15	Brent Russell
RW	14	Stefan Terblanche
OC	13	André Snyman
IC	12	De Wet Barry
LW	11	Ashwin Willemse
FH	10	Louis Koen
SH	9	Joost van der Westhuizen
N8	8	Juan Smith
BF	7	Wikus van Heerden
OF	6	Corné Krige (c)
RL	5	Bakkies Botha
LL	4	Victor Matfield
TP	3	Richard Bands
HK	2	Danie Coetzee
LP	1	Lawrence Sephaka
Replacements:
HK	16	Dale Santon
PR	17	Robbi Kempson
LK	18	Selborne Boome
FL	19	Pedrie Wannenburg
SH	20	Craig Davidson
CE	21	Gcobani Bobo
FH	22	André Pretorius
Coach:
Rudolf Straeuli

FB	15	Mils Muliaina
RW	14	Doug Howlett
OC	13	Tana Umaga
IC	12	Aaron Mauger
LW	11	Joe Rokocoko
FH	10	Carlos Spencer
SH	9	Steve Devine
N8	8	Jerry Collins
OF	7	Richie McCaw
BF	6	Reuben Thorne (c)
RL	5	Ali Williams
LL	4	Chris Jack
TP	3	Greg Somerville
HK	2	Keven Mealamu
LP	1	Dave Hewett
Replacements:
HK	16	Mark Hammett
PR	17	Kees Meeuws
LK	18	Brad Thorn
N8	19	Rodney So'oialo
SH	20	Justin Marshall
FH	21	Dan Carter
WG	22	Caleb Ralph
Coach:
John Mitchell

=== Round 3 ===
26 July 2003
20:00 AEST (UTC+10)

Australia	21–50	New Zealand (1 BP)
Try: Burke; Rogers; Sailor; Pen: Burke (2)		Try: Carter; Howlett; Mauger; Rokocoko (3); Umaga; Con: Carter; Spencer (2); Pen: Spencer (3)

Stadium Australia, Sydney
Attendance: 82,096
Referee: Tony Spreadbury (England)

FB	15	Matt Burke
RW	14	Wendell Sailor
OC	13	Mat Rogers
IC	12	Elton Flatley
LW	11	Lote Tuqiri
FH	10	Stephen Larkham
SH	9	George Gregan (c)
N8	8	Toutai Kefu
OF	7	Phil Waugh
BF	6	George Smith
RL	5	Dan Vickerman
LL	4	David Giffin
TP	3	Patricio Noriega
HK	2	Brendan Cannon
LP	1	Bill Young
Replacements:
HK	16	Adam Freier
PR	17	Ben Darwin
LK	18	Nathan Sharpe
N8	19	Owen Finegan
SH	20	Chris Whitaker
CE	21	Steve Kefu
FB	22	Chris Latham
Coach:
Eddie Jones

FB	15	Mils Muliaina
RW	14	Doug Howlett
OC	13	Tana Umaga
IC	12	Aaron Mauger
LW	11	Joe Rokocoko
FH	10	Carlos Spencer
SH	9	Justin Marshall
N8	8	Jerry Collins
OF	7	Richie McCaw
BF	6	Reuben Thorne (c)
RL	5	Ali Williams
LL	4	Chris Jack
TP	3	Greg Somerville
HK	2	Keven Mealamu
LP	1	Dave Hewett
Replacements:
HK	16	Mark Hammett
PR	17	Kees Meeuws
LK	18	Brad Thorn
FL	19	Marty Holah
SH	20	Steve Devine
FH	21	Dan Carter
WG	22	Caleb Ralph
Coach:
John Mitchell

=== Round 4 ===
2 August 2003
20:00 AEST (UTC+10)

Australia	29–9	South Africa
Try: Rogers; Waugh; Con: Flatley (2); Pen: Flatley (5)		Pen: Koen (3)

Lang Park, Brisbane
Attendance: 51,188
Referee: Paddy O'Brien (New Zealand)

FB	15	Chris Latham
RW	14	Wendell Sailor
OC	13	Mat Rogers
IC	12	Elton Flatley
LW	11	Lote Tuqiri
FH	10	Stephen Larkham
SH	9	George Gregan (c)
N8	8	Toutai Kefu
OF	7	Phil Waugh
BF	6	George Smith
RL	5	Dan Vickerman
LL	4	David Giffin
TP	3	Patricio Noriega
HK	2	Brendan Cannon
LP	1	Bill Young
Replacements:
HK	16	Jeremy Paul
PR	17	Glen Panoho
LK	18	Nathan Sharpe
N8	19	Owen Finegan
SH	20	Chris Whitaker
CE	21	Matt Giteau
FB	22	Matt Burke
Coach:
Eddie Jones

FB	15	André Pretorius
RW	14	Stefan Terblanche
OC	13	Jorrie Muller
IC	12	De Wet Barry
LW	11	Ashwin Willemse
FH	10	Louis Koen
SH	9	Craig Davidson
N8	8	Juan Smith
BF	7	Joe van Niekerk
OF	6	Corné Krige (c)
RL	5	Victor Matfield
LL	4	Selborne Boome
TP	3	Richard Bands
HK	2	Danie Coetzee
LP	1	Robbi Kempson
Replacements:
HK	16	Dale Santon
PR	17	Lawrence Sephaka
LK	18	Bakkies Botha
FL	19	Wikus van Heerden
SH	20	Joost van der Westhuizen
CE	21	Gcobani Bobo
FB	22	Brent Russell
Coach:
Rudolf Straeuli

=== Round 5 ===
9 August 2003
19:35 NZST (UTC+12)

New Zealand	19–11	South Africa
Try: Rokocoko; Con: Spencer; Pen: Spencer (4)		Try: Bands; Pen: Koen (2)

Carisbrook, Dunedin
Attendance: 30,200
Referee: Peter Marshall (Australia)

FB	15	Mils Muliaina
RW	14	Doug Howlett
OC	13	Tana Umaga
IC	12	Aaron Mauger
LW	11	Joe Rokocoko
FH	10	Carlos Spencer
SH	9	Justin Marshall
N8	8	Jerry Collins
OF	7	Marty Holah
BF	6	Reuben Thorne (c)
RL	5	Ali Williams
LL	4	Brad Thorn
TP	3	Kees Meeuws
HK	2	Mark Hammett
LP	1	Dave Hewett
Replacements:
HK	16	Keven Mealamu
PR	17	Greg Somerville
LK	18	Chris Jack
N8	19	Rodney So'oialo
SH	20	Byron Kelleher
FH	21	Dan Carter
FB	22	Leon MacDonald
Coach:
John Mitchell

FB	15	Thinus Delport
RW	14	Stefan Terblanche
OC	13	Jorrie Muller
IC	12	Gcobani Bobo
LW	11	Ashwin Willemse
FH	10	Louis Koen
SH	9	Joost van der Westhuizen
N8	8	Juan Smith
BF	7	Joe van Niekerk
OF	6	Corné Krige (c)
RL	5	Victor Matfield
LL	4	Geo Cronjé
TP	3	Richard Bands
HK	2	Danie Coetzee
LP	1	Lawrence Sephaka
Replacements:
HK	16	Lukas van Biljon
PR	17	Christo Bezuidenhout
LK	18	Selbourne Boome
FL	19	Pedrie Wannenburg
SH	20	Neil de Kock
CE	21	De Wet Barry
FB	22	André Pretorius
Coach:
Rudolf Straeuli

=== Round 6 ===
16 August 2003
19:35 NZST (UTC+12)

New Zealand	21–17	Australia (1 BP)
Try: Howlett (2); Con: Spencer; Pen: Spencer (3)		Try: Smith; Pen: Flatley (4)

Eden Park, Auckland
Attendance: 45,000
Referee: Jonathan Kaplan (South Africa)

FB	15	Mils Muliaina
RW	14	Doug Howlett
OC	13	Tana Umaga
IC	12	Aaron Mauger
LW	11	Joe Rokocoko
FH	10	Carlos Spencer
SH	9	Justin Marshall
N8	8	Jerry Collins
OF	7	Richie McCaw
BF	6	Reuben Thorne (c)
RL	5	Ali Williams
LL	4	Chris Jack
TP	3	Greg Somerville
HK	2	Keven Mealamu
LP	1	Dave Hewett
Replacements:
HK	16	Mark Hammett
PR	17	Kees Meeuws
LK	18	Brad Thorn
N8	19	Marty Holah
SH	20	Steve Devine
FH	21	Dan Carter
FB	22	Leon MacDonald
Coach:
John Mitchell

FB	15	Chris Latham
RW	14	Wendell Sailor
OC	13	Mat Rogers
IC	12	Elton Flatley
LW	11	Lote Tuqiri
FH	10	Stephen Larkham
SH	9	George Gregan (c)
N8	8	Toutai Kefu
OF	7	Phil Waugh
BF	6	George Smith
RL	5	Dan Vickerman
LL	4	David Giffin
TP	3	Glen Panoho
HK	2	Brendan Cannon
LP	1	Bill Young
Replacements:
HK	16	Jeremy Paul
PR	17	Al Baxter
LK	18	Nathan Sharpe
N8	19	Owen Finegan
SH	20	Chris Whitaker
CE	21	Matt Giteau
FB	22	Matt Burke
Coach:
Eddie Jones
