= 2002 Currie Cup =

Domestic rugby union competition

- Countries: South Africa
- Date: 19 July – 26 October 2002
- Champions: Blue Bulls (19th title)
- Runners-up: Golden Lions

The 2002 Currie Cup was the 2002 season of the South African domestic rugby union competition, the Absa Currie Cup premier division, played from 19 July 2002 – 26 October 2002. The finals were played at Ellis Park Stadium where the Blue Bulls beat the Golden Lions 31–7 to win the Cup. This would be the first win for the Blue Bulls in a streak of 3 consecutive Currie Cup wins from 2002-2004. South African pay TV channel SuperSport obtained exclusive rights to broadcast the 2002 Currie Cup. The public broadcaster, the South African Broadcasting Corporation could only begin broadcasting the matches 2 hours after SuperSport began their broadcast.

== Qualification ==
The final log of the 2002 Currie Cup qualification series:

Section X
Pos	Team	Pld	W	D	L	PF	PA	PD	TF	TA	TB	LB	Pts	Qualification
1	Western Province	6	5	0	1	253	113	+140	33	13	4	1	25	2002 Currie Cup Top 8
2	Free State Cheetahs	6	5	0	1	239	122	+117	29	13	4	1	25	2002 Currie Cup Top 8
3	Falcons	6	3	0	3	195	154	+41	24	17	2	2	16	2002 Currie Cup Top 8
4	Griquas	6	3	0	3	207	228	−21	30	32	3	0	15	2002 Currie Cup Top 8
5	Border Bulldogs	6	3	0	3	136	155	−19	16	18	2	0	14	2002 Bankfin Cup
6	Boland Cavaliers	6	2	0	4	136	194	−58	20	27	2	0	10	2002 Bankfin Cup
7	Griffons	6	0	0	6	107	307	−200	11	43	0	0	0	2002 Bankfin Cup

Rules for classification: 4 points for a win; 2 points for a draw; 1 bonus point for a loss by seven points or less; 1 bonus point for scoring four or more tries in a match

Section Y
Pos	Team	Pld	W	D	L	PF	PA	PD	TF	TA	TB	LB	Pts	Qualification
1	Sharks	6	4	1	1	257	125	+132	34	14	4	0	22	2002 Currie Cup Top 8
2	Blue Bulls	6	4	1	1	185	125	+60	21	14	3	1	22	2002 Currie Cup Top 8
3	Golden Lions	6	4	0	2	227	189	+38	28	19	4	1	21	2002 Currie Cup Top 8
4	Pumas	6	2	0	4	189	220	−31	25	29	5	2	15	2002 Currie Cup Top 8
5	SWD Eagles	6	3	0	3	152	194	−42	14	26	2	1	15	2002 Bankfin Cup
6	Leopards	6	2	0	4	131	216	−85	16	27	2	1	11	2002 Bankfin Cup
7	Mighty Elephants	6	1	0	5	158	230	−72	19	28	2	2	8	2002 Bankfin Cup

Rules for classification: 4 points for a win; 2 points for a draw; 1 bonus point for a loss by seven points or less; 1 bonus point for scoring four or more tries in a match

The following matches were played in the 2002 Currie Cup qualification series:

== Section X ==
=== Round one ===
19/07/2002	Border Bulldogs	12 – 25	Falcons

20/07/2002	Boland Cavaliers	45 – 28	Griquas

20/07/2002	Griffons	23 – 49	Free State Cheetahs

=== Round two ===
27/07/2002	Free State Cheetahs	31 – 33	Border Bulldogs

27/07/2002	Falcons	49 – 17	Boland Cavaliers

27/07/2002	Western province	47 – 10	Griffons

=== Round three ===
02/08/2002	Boland Cavaliers	10 – 24	Free State Cheetahs

02/08/2002	Border Bulldogs	8 – 42	Western Province

03/08/2002	Griquas	29 – 28	Falcons

=== Round four ===
23/08/2002	Western Province	41 – 13	Boland Cavaliers

24/08/2002	Free State Cheetahs	57 – 15	Griquas

24/08/2002	Griffons	23 – 32	Border Bulldogs

=== Round five ===
31/08/2002	Boland Cavaliers	44 – 19	Griffons

31/08/2002	Griquas	24 – 68	Western Province

31/08/2002	Falcons	15 – 47	Free State Cheetahs

=== Round six ===
06/09/2002	Western Province	29 – 27	Falcons

07/09/2002	Border Bulldogs	33 – 7	Boland Cavaliers

07/09/2002	Griffons	12 – 84	Griquas

=== Round seven ===
13/09/2002	Griquas	27 – 18	Border Bulldogs

14/09/2002	Free State Cheetahs	31 – 26	Western Province

14/09/2002	Falcons	51 – 20	Griffons

== Section Y ==
=== Round one ===
19/07/2002	Leopards	15 – 32	Blue Bulls
	Pen: Willem de Waal (4); Drop: Pietie Meyer		Try: Pedrie Wannenburg, Tiaan Joubert, Gavin September, Jaco van der Westhuyzen; Con: Derick Hougaard, Jaco van der Westhuyzen (2); Pen: Jaco van der Westhuyzen; Drop: Johan Roets

20/07/2002	Mighty Elephants	20 – 35	Pumas

20/07/2002	SWD Eagles	44 – 39	Golden Lions

=== Round two ===
19/07/2002	Natal Sharks	52 – 10	SWD Eagles

20/07/2002	Golden Lions	55 – 16	Mighty Elephants

20/07/2002	Pumas	35 – 42	Leopards

=== Round three ===
03/08/2002	Blue Bulls	37 – 10	Pumas
	Try: Danie Coetzee, Richard Bands, Geo Cronje, Wessel Roux, Johan Wasserman; Con: Jaco van der Westhuyzen (3); Pen: Jaco van der Westhuyzen (2)		Try: Franco Smith; Con: Marius Goosen; Pen: Marius Goosen

03/08/2002	Leopards	24 – 31	Golden Lions

03/08/2002	Mighty Elephants	16 – 30	Natal Sharks

=== Round four ===
24/08/2002	Golden Lions	20 – 33	Blue Bulls
	Try: Johann van Niekerk, Grant Esterhuizen; Con: Louis Koen (2); Pen: Louis Koen (2)		Try: Dries Scholtz, Richard Bands, Johan Wasserman; Con: Jaco van der Westhuyzen (3); Pen: Jaco van der Westhuyzen (4)

24/08/2002	Natal Sharks	52 – 10	Leopards

24/08/2002	SWD Eagles	32 – 27	Mighty Elephants

=== Round five ===
30/08/2002	Leopards	10 – 37	SWD Eagles

30/08/2002	Pumas	35 – 36	Golden Lions

31/08/2002	Blue Bulls	17 – 17	Sharks	Loftus Versveld
	Try: Dries Scholtz; Pen: Jaco van der Westhuizen (4)		Try: Stefan Terblanche, Penalty try Con: Butch James (2); Pen: Butch James

=== Round six ===
07/09/2002	Mighty Elephants	29 – 30	Leopards

07/09/2002	Natal Sharks	69 – 26	Pumas

07/09/2002	SWD Eagles	13 – 18	Blue Bulls
	Try: Jaco Gouws; Con: Rynhard van As; Pen: Rynhard van As (2)		Try: Wessel Roux, Derick Hougaard; Con: Derick Hougaard; Pen: Jaco van der Westhuyzen (2)

=== Round seven ===
13/09/2002	Pumas	48 – 16	SWD Eagles

14/09/2002	Blue Bulls	48 – 50	Mighty Elephants
	Try: Pedrie Wannenburg, Dries Scholtz, Wylie Human, Danie Rossouw, Derick Hougaard, Norman Jordaan; Con: Derick Hougaard (6); Pen: Derick Hougaard; Drop: Derick Hougaard		Try: Fabian Juries (2), Sam Gerber (2), Paul Treu (2), Tjaart Coetzee, Wayne van Heerden; Con: Clinton van Rensburg (4), Brett Hennessey

14/09/2002	Golden Lions	46 – 37	Natal Sharks

== Log ==
The final log of the 2002 Currie Cup Top 8 series:

2002 Currie Cup Top 8 log
Pos	Team	Pld	W	D	L	PF	PA	PD	TF	TA	TB	LB	Pts	Qualification
1	Sharks	7	5	1	1	324	160	+164	43	14	6	0	28	2002 Currie Cup Top 8 semi-finals
2	Free State Cheetahs	7	6	0	1	273	181	+92	33	19	3	0	27	2002 Currie Cup Top 8 semi-finals
3	Golden Lions	7	5	0	2	250	184	+66	28	20	5	1	26	2002 Currie Cup Top 8 semi-finals
4	Blue Bulls	7	5	1	1	225	136	+89	21	13	2	1	25	2002 Currie Cup Top 8 semi-finals
5	Western Province	7	3	0	4	228	239	−11	24	23	2	2	16	
6	Pumas	7	2	0	5	213	298	−85	22	41	4	2	14	
7	Griquas	7	1	0	6	134	316	−182	17	42	2	1	7	
8	Falcons	7	0	0	7	146	279	−133	18	34	1	3	4	

Rules for classification: 4 points for a win; 2 points for a draw; 1 bonus point for a loss by seven points or less; 1 bonus point for scoring four or more tries in a match

== Currie Cup Top 8 ==
=== Round one ===
20/09/2002	Falcons	32 – 38	Pumas

21/09/2002	Free State Cheetahs	35 – 29	Blue Bulls
	Try: Kennedy Tsimba, Boela du Plooy; Con: Kennedy Tsimba (2); Pen: Kennedy Tsimba (7)		Try: Pedrie Wannenburg, Danie Coetzee; Con: Derick Hougaard (2); Pen: Derick Hougaard (5)

21/09/2002	Griquas	12 – 29	Golden Lions

21/09/2002	Western Province	29 – 36	Natal Sharks

=== Round two ===
27/09/2002	Natal Sharks	33 – 6	Free State Cheetahs

28/09/2002	Blue Bulls	35 – 26	Western Province
	Try: Norman Jordaan; Pen: Derick Hougaard (9); Drop: Derick Hougaard		Try: Neil de kock, Egon Seconds; Con: Chris Rossouw (2); Pen: Chris Rossouw (4)

28/09/2002	Golden Lions	47 – 25	Falcons

28/09/2002	Pumas	27 – 19	Griquas

=== Round three ===
04/10/2002	Western Province	37 – 36	Pumas

05/10/2002	Free State Cheetahs	29 – 22	Golden Lions

05/10/2002	Griquas	28 – 29	Blue Bulls
	Try: Paul de koker, Louis Loubser, Jearus Nichols, Jannie Bornman; Con: Quintin van Tonder; Pen: Quintin van Tonder, Corrie Avenant		Try: Danie Coetzee, Jaco van der Westhuyzen, Frikkie Welsh; Con: Derick Hougaard; Pen: Derick Hougaard (3); Drop: Derick Hougaard

05/10/2002	Falcons	19 – 44	Natal Sharks

=== Round four ===
11/10/2002	Blue Bulls	45 – 0	Falcons
	Try: Jaco van der Westhuyzen (3), Wylie Human, Richard Bands, Anton Leonard; Con: Derick Hougaard (2), Jaco van der Westhuyzen; Pen: Derick Hougaard (3)

12/10/2002	Golden Lions	50 – 13	Western Province

12/10/2002	Natal Sharks	78 – 7	Griquas

12/10/2002	Pumas	41 – 68	Free State Cheetahs

=== Semifinals ===
19/10/2002	Free State Cheetahs	29 – 43	Golden Lions

19/10/2002	Sharks	19 – 22	Blue Bulls
	Try: Butch James; Con: Butch James; Pen: Butch James (4)		Try: Dries Scholtz; Con: Derick Hougaard; Pen: Derick Hougaard (4); Drop: Derick Hougaard

=== Grand final ===
26/10/2002	Golden Lions	7 – 31	Blue Bulls
	Try: Andre Pretorius; Con: Andre Pretorius	Report	Try: Pedrie Wannenburg; Derick Hougaard; Pen: Derick Hougaard (5); Drop: Derick Hougaard (2)

=== Final squads ===
Golden Lions:
FB	15	Jacque Fourie
RW	14	John Daniels
OC	13	Grant Esterhuizen
IC	12	Jorrie Muller
LW	11	Jaco Booysen
FH	10	André Pretorius
SH	9	Bennie Nortje
N8	8	Russel Winter
BF	7	Andre Vos (c)
OF	6	Wikus van Heerden
RL	5	Jannes Labuschagne
LL	4	Kleinjan Tromp
TP	3	Willie Meyer
HK	2	Delarey du Preez
LP	1	Lawrence Sephaka
Substitutes:
HK	16	James van der Walt
PR	17	Pietman van Niekerk
PR	18	Willem Stoltz
BR	19	Joe van Niekerk
BR	20	Deon de Kock
SH	21	Louis Koen
OB	22	Jaco Pretorius
Coach:
Frans Ludeke

Blue Bulls:
FB	15	Jaco van der Westhuyzen
RW	14	Wylie Human
OC	13	Dries Scholtz
IC	12	Tiaan Joubert
LW	11	Gavin Passens
FH	10	Derick Hougaard
SH	9	Joost van der Westhuizen (c)
N8	8	Anton Leonard
BF	7	Johan Wasserman
OF	6	Pedrie Wannenburg
RL	5	Victor Matfield
LL	4	Bakkies Botha
TP	3	Richard Bands
HK	2	Danie Coetzee
LP	1	Wessel Roux
Substitutes:
HK	16	Gary Botha
PR	17	Sias Wagner
PR	18	Geo Cronje
BR	19	Ruan Vermeulen
SH	20	Norman Jordaan
CE	21	JP Nel
OB	22	Johan Roets
Coach:
Heyneke Meyer

Referees:
Jonathan Kaplan
Andre Watson Assistant
Mark Lawrence Assistant
Television match official:
Steve Strydom
