= Ngauamo =

Ngauamo is a surname. Notable people with the surname include:

- Johnny Ngauamo (born 1969), Togan rugby player
- Maile Ngauamo (born 1993), Tongan rugby union player
- Milton Ngauamo (born 1976), New Zealand-born Tongan rugby union player
- Paul Ngauamo (born 1990), New Zealand rugby union player
