= Tuamoheloa =

Tuamoheloa or Tuʻamoheloa is a surname. Notable people with the surname include:

- Nathaniel Tuamoheloa (born 1994), American Samoan wrestler
- Sione Tuʻamoheloa (born 1980), Tongan rugby union player
