= Lions4Life =

- Genre: Sports reality show
- Created by: GreenSmile Productions
- Country of origin: South Africa
- Original language: English

Production
- Running time: 30 minutes

Original release
- Network: SuperSport 1
- Release: 23 February 2012 – 2013

Lions4Life is a monthly reality show produced by GreenSmile Productions. It debuted on SuperSport (South African broadcaster) 1 on Thursday, 23 February 2012 at 19:30 for its first season, which ran for 11 episodes. Currently, Lions4Life is in its second season, which aired on 31 January 2013.

== Plot ==
The series follows the Johannesburg-based MTN Lions or Golden Lions rugby team, both on and off the field, to show the team's preparation and performance throughout the season. The 26-minute show covers a wide array of the team's objectives for the season and shares inside jokes, players’ personal lives and hobbies, community involvement and team strategies. The show incorporates the different personalities that make up the team and gives viewers an inside look at the rigorous physical training programmes the players complete and endure.

The show unlocks many different areas within the MTN Lions or Golden Lions rugby team for viewers to see – from training in the gym and practising on the field to spending time in the players’ homes, at social events and meeting their families and fans. The show is for the supporters and allows them to gain a knowledge and understanding of Lions Rugby, as well as the lives of the players. Through social media, including Facebook, Twitter and YouTube, the show further engages rugby supporters and communities.

== Production ==
Former Springbok and Lions rugby player, Ashwin Willemse, is the executive producer of the show. Creative Director and Producer Michelle Tasic graduated with Honours from Otis College of Art and Design Los Angeles with a bachelor's degree in Digital Media. She has worked on several international productions which include The Lord of the Rings: The Battle for Middle-earth and Command & Conquer 3: Tiberium Wars for Electronic Arts.
