= Patrick Segi =

- Born: 21 September 1980 (age 46) Auckland, New Zealand
- Height: 6 ft 0 in (1.83 m)
- Weight: 210 lb (95 kg)

Rugby union career
Senior career
Years	Team	Apps	(Points)
2001-2003	Waitemata		
Provincial / State sides
Years	Team	Apps	(Points)
2002	Counties Manukau	1	(0)
International career
Years	Team	Apps	(Points)
2001-2002	Samoa	11	(0)

Patrick Segi (born Auckland, 21 September 1980) is a New Zealand-born Samoan former rugby union player. He played as a flanker.

== Career ==
His first cap was against Tonga, at Apia, on 2 June 2001 and his last cap was against Tonga, at Apia, on 28 June 2002. He also was part of the 2003 Rugby World Cup roster, but he never played any match. He also played for Counties Manukau in the National Provincial Championship.
