= Michael von Dincklage =

- Born: 21 June 1978 (age 48) Auckland, New Zealand
- Height: 6 ft 3 in (1.91 m)
- Weight: 240 lb (110 kg)

Rugby union career
Amateur team(s)
Years	Team	Apps	(Points)
–	Waitemata		
Provincial / State sides
Years	Team	Apps	(Points)
2004	Northland	7	(0)
International career
Years	Team	Apps	(Points)
2003–2004	Samoa	1	(0)

Michael von Dincklage (born 21 June 1978 in Auckland) is a former New Zealand-born Samoan rugby union player. He played as a lock.

== Career ==
He was present in the 2003 Rugby World Cup roster, although he never played any game in the tournament. His only international cap was against Scotland, at Wellington, on 4 June 2004.
