= Norman Jordaan =

South African rugby union player

- Born: 3 April 1975 (age 51) Cape Town, South Africa
- Height: 5 ft 11 in (180 cm)
- Weight: 203 lb (92 kg)

Rugby union career
- Position: Scrum-half
Super Rugby
Years	Team	Apps	(Points)
- Bulls
- Cats
International career
Years	Team	Apps	(Points)
2002	South Africa	1	(0)

Norman Jordaan (born 3 April 1975) is a South African former rugby union international for the Springboks.

Born and raised in Cape Town, Jordaan was a scrum-half and played for the Blue Bulls in the Currie Cup, where he was a member of three title winning teams. In the Super 12 competition he competed for the Bulls and Cats. He had several seasons in French rugby and was in the same Toulon side as fellow scrum-half George Gregan.

Jordaan made his only Test appearance for the Springboks in a heavy defeat to England at Twickenham in 2002. He was brought into the game off the bench after only 10 minutes, to replace Bolla Conradie.

In 2022 he was appointed head coach of the Maties Rugby Club.

== See also ==
- List of South Africa national rugby union players
