= Robbi Kempson =

South African rugby union player (born 1974)

- Full name: Robert Bruce Kempson
- Born: 23 February 1974 (age 52) Queenstown, South Africa
- Height: 1.85 m (6 ft 1 in)
- Weight: 115 kg (18 st 2 lb; 254 lb)
- School: Queen's College, Queenstown
- University: University of Natal

Rugby union career
- Position: Prop
Senior career
Years	Team	Apps	(Points)
1994–1998	Sharks		
1996–1998	Sharks		
1999–2003	Stormers		
1999–2001	Western Province		
1999	→ Newport		
2002–2004	Ulster		
2004–2005	Northampton Saints		
- Correct as of 9 March 2016
International career
Years	Team	Apps	(Points)
- South Africa Schools
1994	South Africa Under-23		
1996	South Africa 'A'		
1998–2003	South Africa (test)	37	
1998–2003	South Africa (tour)	1	
- Correct as of 9 March 2016

Robert Bruce Kempson (born 23 February 1974 in Queenstown, South Africa) is a South African former rugby union footballer, and the Director of High Performance and interim head coach of the Southern Kings in Pro14.

He played rugby between 1994 and 2003 for Natal, Western Province and Irish side Ulster, and also played in 37 test matches and one tour match for the South Africa national team. His regular position was prop.

== Rugby career ==
=== Playing career ===
When Kempson was still attending Queen's College, in Queenstown, he was selected to play in the South Africa Schools side. After school, he joined Natal, where he played his first class rugby until 1998.

Kempson was selected to represent South Africa at various youth or development levels; in 1994, he represented the South Africa Under-23 team and later in the same year, he toured with a South Africa Development side to the United Kingdom. He was named on the bench for South Africa in a match in 1995 against Wales in Johannesburg, but failed to make an appearance; but his good form continued as he was named the South African Rugby Young Player of the Year for 1995 In 1996, he played for a South Africa 'A' team that toured the United Kingdom and in 1997, he played for both the Sharks and the Emerging Springboks against the British and Irish Lions during their 1997 tour to South Africa.

On 20 June 1998, he finally made his test debut, playing off the bench in their match against Ireland in a mid-year rugby union international. He was promoted to the starting line-up for their 96–13 victory over Wales a week later and retained the number one jersey in an 18–0 victory over England.

After the 1998 Currie Cup, Kempson move to Cape Town, where he joined Currie Cup side Western Province and Super Rugby side the Stormers. However, he failed to be selected in the South Africa side that competed at the 1999 Rugby World Cup, instead joining Welsh side Newport on a short-term basis, here he joined fellow South Africans Gary Teichmann, Franco Smith and Andy Marinos.

He returned to South Africa to play for the Stormers and Western Province in 2000 and 2001, also forcing his way back into Springbok selection. However, a neck operation at the start of 2002 ruled him out of the entire 2002 Super 12 season. He then signed a deal with Irish side Ulster, where he joined former Stormers coach Alan Solomons. He did return to South Africa to play Stormers during the 2003 Super 12 season and appeared for the Springboks in the 2003 Tri Nations Series – where South Africa's 9–29 defeat to Australia turned out to be Kempson's final test match for South Africa – before returning to Ulster.

When Solomons left Ulster to join English Premiership side Northampton Saints, he also lured Kempson across the Irish Sea. However, Kempson's time in Northampton was marred by injuries and he was released after just one season.

=== Coaching career ===
Kempson's relationship with Alan Solomons continued when his playing career ended, and Kempson was appointed a forwards coach at the UCT Ikey Tigers, where Solomons was the technical director. He also assisted Gary Gold by coaching the Western Province Vodacom Cup team in 2007 and Namibia in their preparation for the 2007 Rugby World Cup.

In 2009, Kempson moved to Port Elizabeth to join Solomons' coaching staff at the Mighty Elephants, where he was also appointed the manager of their newly established academy in 2010. Kempson remained in his role as Academy Director over the next few years, also coaching the Eastern Province U21 side in the 2011, 2012 and 2013 Under-21 Provincial Championships and the NMMU Young Guns in the 2014 and 2015 Varsity Cup Young Guns competitions.

In March 2016, the Eastern Province Rugby Union confirmed that Kempson would be the head coach of the Eastern Province Kings for the 2016 Currie Cup qualification series.
