= Craig Davidson (rugby union) =

South African rugby union player

- Full name: Craig Dugald Davidson
- Born: 23 February 1977 (age 49) King William's Town, Eastern Cape, South Africa
- Height: 5 ft 9 in (175 cm)
- Weight: 178 lb (81 kg)

Rugby union career
- Position: Scrum-half
Senior career
Years	Team	Apps	(Points)
	Sharks	109	
International career
Years	Team	Apps	(Points)
2002–03	South Africa	5	(10)

Craig Dugald Davidson (born 23 February 1977) is a South African former rugby union international who represented the Springboks in five Test matches.

Davidson, born in King William's Town, was educated at Durban's Northwood School.

After playing his early rugby for the Crusaders Rugby Club in Durban, Davidson debuted for the Sharks in the 1999 Currie Cup and the following year played his first Super 12 season. A scrum-half, Davidson was a Test player for the Springboks in 2002 and 2003. On debut against Wales in Cape Town he scored a late try in a 19–8 win for the Springboks. He also played two Tests against Argentina and featured twice in the 2003 Tri Nations Series.

By the time Davidson retired in 2006, due to injuries, he had earned 53 Currie Cup and 56 Super Rugby caps for the Sharks. In 2009 he was presented with the exclusive Freedom of the Park Award from the club.

== See also ==
- List of South Africa national rugby union players
