= Dale Santon =

South African rugby union footballer

- Born: 18 August 1969 (age 57) Cape Town, South Africa
- Height: 1.80 m (5 ft 11 in)
- Weight: 107 kg (236 lb)
- School: Spine Road High School, Mitchells Plain

Rugby union career
- Position: Hooker
Provincial / State sides
Years	Team	Apps	(Points)
1993, 1995	Western Province	2	(0)
1996–2002	Boland Cavaliers	120	(165)
2003	SWD Eagles	4	(0)
2003–2004	Bulls	22	(10)
International career
Years	Team	Apps	(Points)
1997, 2003	South Africa	4	

Dale Santon (born 18 August 1969) is a former South African rugby union player.

== Playing career ==
Santon played for the Western Province Sacos Schools team in 1986 and made his senior provincial debut for Western Province in 1993. In 1996 he joined the Boland Cavaliers and played 120 games over a seven-year period, scoring 33 tries for the union. In 1996, Santon was also selected for the South African A team, a feat he achieved again in 2001.

He also had two stints in Super Rugby, both with the Bulls. His first event was during the 1998 and 1999 seasons, when he played ten games and then again in 2003 and 2004.

Santon toured with the Springboks during the end of the year tour to Europe in 1997 and played in one tour game. He made his test debut for the Springboks during the 2003 Tri Nations, as a replacement for Danie Coetzee against Australia at Newlands in Cape Town. Santon was also a member of the South African squad for the 2003 Rugby World Cup that was held in Australia and played in the test against Georgia during the Pool stages of the tournament. He played in four test matches for the Springboks.

=== Test history ===
No.	Opposition	Result (SA 1st)	Position	Tries	Date	Venue
1.	Australia	26–22	Replacement		12 Jul 2003	Newlands, Cape Town
2.	New Zealand	16–52	Replacement		19 Jul 2003	Loftus Versfeld, Pretoria
3.	Australia	9–29	Replacement		2 Aug 2003	Suncorp Stadium, Brisbane
4.	Georgia	46–19	Replacement		24 Oct 2003	Sydney Football Stadium, Sydney

== See also ==
- List of South Africa national rugby union players
