= Christo Bezuidenhout =

South African rugby union player

- Full name: Christo Johannes Bezuidenhout
- Born: 14 May 1970 (age 56) Tenerife, Spain
- Height: 1.87 m (6 ft 1 1/2 in)
- Weight: 116 kg (256 lb; 18 st 4 lb)
- School: Hoërskool Zwartkop

Rugby union career
- Position: Prop
- Current team: Gloucester Rugby
International career
Years	Team	Apps	(Points)
2003	South Africa	4	(0)

Christo Johannes Bezuidenhout (born 14 May 1970) is a Spanish-born former South African international rugby union, that usually played as a prop.

== Biography ==
Born on the island of Tenerife in the Canary Islands (Spain), where his father worked as a telecommunications engineer. Bezuidenhout debut in the national rugby at Currie Cup in 1994, only to disappear for a few years, apparently to perform agricultural work on the family farm. He reappeared in 1999, when he was contracted by the Bulls in a professional level and the Pumas in the Currie Cup.

He started his career in the South Africa national rugby union team in 33 against New Zealand in the 2003 Tri Nations Series Tournament; A few months later he participated in the 2003 Rugby World Cup in Australia with only 3 appearances, which were his last international.

In 2004 he moved to England to Gloucester for a season, after which he retired from rugby.
