= Gcobani Bobo =

South African rugby union player

- Born: Gcobani Bobo; 12 September 1979 (age 47) King William's Town, South Africa
- Height: 180 cm (5 ft 11 in)
- Weight: 97 kg (15 st 4 lb; 214 lb)
- School: Dale College; Rondebosch Boys' High

Rugby union career
- Position(s): Centre, Wing
Senior career
Years	Team	Apps	(Points)
2001–2004	Golden Lions		
2005–2007	Sharks (Currie Cup)		
2008–2009	Western Province		
2009–2011	Newcastle		
Super Rugby
Years	Team	Apps	(Points)
2002–2003	Cats	13	(30)
2005–2007	Sharks	13	(5)
2008–2009	Stormers	25	(10)
International career
Years	Team	Apps	(Points)
2003–2008	South Africa	6	(0)
2013	Bermuda Select XV		

Gcobani Bobo (born 12 September 1979) is a former South African rugby player, rugby commentator and author. His preferred position was centre, although he had played wing on numerous occasions, with some success due to his pace. Bobo played for the Golden Lions, Sharks, Western Province, Newcastle Falcons, Cats, Sharks and the Stormers.

== Career ==
Bobo started his career as a flanker, until then Bok coach Nick Mallet suggested that Bobo should shift from the side of the scrum to the midfield. Bobo was selected for the South African U-19 side in 1998 and then spent two years playing for the Golden Lions U-21 outfit. His performances in the then Bankfin Currie Cup earned him selection to the SA 'A' team in 2001. When he was elevated to Super Rugby, he was ready. The burly centre scored a hat-trick on debut against the Bulls, and looked set for full Springbok colours before a knee injury at the House of Pain put paid to his short-term ambitions.

Bobo had been named in Rudolf Straeuli's squad for the 2003 Rugby World Cup, but a torn anterior cruciate ligament in a warm-up encounter put paid to his chances of selection. Jake White realised Bobo's potential and tested him on the Vodacom Outgoing Tour in 2004. But Bobo had lost some of his enthusiasm and he lacked pace.

Given a second chance by Rassie Erasmus, Bobo returned home to the Cape to play for the Stormers Super 14 team and has rediscovered the form that made him a Bok, partnering Jean de Villiers. At the conclusion of the 2009 season, like de Villiers, Bobo left, signing for an overseas team, Newcastle Falcons.
