= Milton Ngauamo =

Tongan rugby union player

- Born: Milton Makasini Ngauamo; 25 May 1976 (age 50) Auckland, New Zealand
- Height: 6 ft 5 in (1.96 m)
- Weight: 252 lb (114 kg)
- Notable relative: Johnny Ngauamo (brother)

Rugby union career
- Position: Lock
Amateur team(s)
Years	Team	Apps	(Points)
1998-1999	Marist		
2000-2002	Oriental Rongotai		
Senior career
Years	Team	Apps	(Points)
2003-2007	Calvisano	31	(0)
2007-2010	Lyon OU	53	(0)
Provincial / State sides
Years	Team	Apps	(Points)
1998–1999	Auckland	12	(5)
2000-2002	Wellington	26	(5)
Super Rugby
Years	Team	Apps	(Points)
2002	Hurricanes	5	(0)
International career
Years	Team	Apps	(Points)
1997	New Zealand U-21	3	(0)
1998–2005	Tonga	39	(40)

Milton Makasini Ngauamo (born 25 May 1976 in Auckland) is a New Zealand-born Tongan former rugby union player. He played as a lock. He is the brother of Johnny Ngauamo, who is also a rugby union player.

== Career ==
Ngauamo debuted for Tonga during a match against Papua New Guinea on 30 November 2002, in Port Moresby. He was also part of the 2003 Rugby World Cup Tonga squad, playing four matches in the tournament. Although not being called up for the 2007 Rugby World Cup squad, Ngauamo still played at international level for Tonga, with his last international test cap being against Fiji on 5 July 2008, in Nuku'alofa. At club level he played the National Provincial Championship for Auckland and Wellington and for the Hurricanes in the Super 14, to then play in Europe for Calvisano and for Lyon OU. Ngauamo also played in 1997 for the New Zealand Colts.
