= Johnny Ngauamo =

- Born: Sione Fotu Ngauamo; 20 July 1969 (age 57) Nuku'alofa, Tonga

Rugby union career
- Position: Centre
Amateur team(s)
Years	Team	Apps	(Points)
- Suburbs RFC
Senior career
Years	Team	Apps	(Points)
1997-1998	Harlequins		
1999-2003	ASM Clermont		
Provincial / State sides
Years	Team	Apps	(Points)
1991-1996	Auckland		
International career
Years	Team	Apps	(Points)
1997-2003	Tonga	6	(5)

Johnny Fotu Ngauamo, was born on 20 July 1969 in Nuku'alofa, Tonga. He received his secondary education at Marcellin College, Auckland. He is a Rugby Union international player who played for Tonga in the position of centre (1.85 metres and 96 kg).

His brother Milton was also an international rugby player.

== Career ==
=== Clubs ===
- Harlequins 1997-1998
- ASM Clermont 1999-2003

=== International ===
He gained his first international cap for Tonga on 14 June 2003 in a match against Ireland and he played for Tonga four other times in that year.

=== Griffith University Colleges Knights ===
As of 2019 Johnny has signed on as head coach for the Knights in the Gold Coast District Rugby Union competition. He is looking to lead the 1st XV to back to back premierships for the first time in club history. 2019, Ngauamao's first in charge was a successful year finishing Minor Premiers at the end of the regular season, unfortunately falling to Helensvale Hogs in the Grand Final. 2020 was an exceptional year for Ngauamo and the Knights going undefeated throughout the whole season. The Grand Final saw the Knights defeat Nerang Bulls 34-12 in the final.
