= Steve Devine =

NZ international rugby union player (born 1976)

- Born: Stephen John Devine; 21 December 1976 (age 49) Boggabri, New South Wales, Australia
- Height: 1.76 m (5 ft 9 1/2 in)
- Weight: 85 kg (187 lb)

Rugby union career
- Position: Scrum Half/Half Back
Provincial / State sides
Years	Team	Apps	(Points)
1998 - 2007	Auckland	78	
Super Rugby
Years	Team	Apps	(Points)
1999 - 2007	Blues	70	(25)
International career
Years	Team	Apps	(Points)
2002–2003	New Zealand	10	(0)
National sevens team
Years	Team		Comps
1998	Australia 7s		

Stephen John Devine (born 12 December 1976) is a New Zealand rugby union footballer. He is a former All Black and international sevens player for Australia.

Devine played for Australia Under-21 before relocating to New Zealand. A loyal servant of Auckland rugby, he made 78 appearances for Auckland and 70 for the Blues in the Super 12 Rugby competition. He was eligible to play for New Zealand on residential grounds, and made his debut for the All Blacks on 9 November 2002, against England during the All Blacks end of year tour. Devine went on to play 10 tests for New Zealand, including the third/fourth place playoff in the 2003 Rugby World Cup.

He had to retire from rugby in 2007 after a series of concussions and other injuries, and a very long recovery from his final on-field concussion (2 years). After retirement, Devine co-hosted a programme on New Zealand Sky TV called This Given Sunday, along with Karl Te Nana.

He is now a firefighter. In 2019, he revealed that he still has migraines, extreme fatigue and light sensitivity due to the left pupil not being able to dilate properly.
