= Sione Tuʻamoheloa =

Tongan rugby union footballer (born 1980)

Sione Tuʻamoheloa (born 20 August 1980) is a Tongan former rugby union player who played as a back-row forward. He played for the Tonga national team and was part of the squad for the 2003 Rugby World Cup.
