= Wikus van Heerden =

South African rugby union player

- Born: Johannes Lodewikus van Heerden; 25 February 1979 (age 47) Johannesburg, South Africa
- Height: 1.93 m (6 ft 4 in)
- Weight: 108 kg (238 lb)
- School: Hoërskool Waterkloof
- Notable relative: Moaner van Heerden (father)

Rugby union career
- Position(s): Flanker, Lock
Provincial / State sides
Years	Team	Apps	(Points)
2001–2006	Golden Lions	25	(35)
2007–2008	Blue Bulls	15	(30)
2009–2010	Saracens	21	(10)
2010–2012	Golden Lions	17	(10)
Super Rugby
Years	Team	Apps	(Points)
2002	Cats	4	(0)
2003	Bulls	11	(10)
2004–2006	Cats	31	(25)
2007–2008	Bulls	27	(50)
2010–2012	Lions	20	(5)
International career
Years	Team	Apps	(Points)
2003–2007	South Africa	14	(5)
Medal record
Men's Rugby union
Representing South Africa
Rugby World Cup
Gold medal – first place	2007 France	Squad

Johannes Lodewikus 'Wikus' van Heerden (born 25 February 1979 in Johannesburg) is a South African former rugby union player who played as a flanker. He finished his career playing for the Lions in Super Rugby, and the Golden Lions in the national Currie Cup competition. Van Heerden also won 14 caps for the South Africa national team, the Springboks. Before his move to the Bulls, he was the captain of the Cats (now known as the Lions).

He announced his retirement during the 2012 Currie Cup Premier Division season.

== Career ==
Van Heerden made his debut for the Springboks on 7 June 2003 as flanker against Scotland at Kings Park in Durban. South Africa won the match 29 points to 25. He played at flanker for the second Test against the Scottish a week later at Ellis Park, which South Africa also won, 28 to 19.

He was subsequently including in South Africa's 2003 Tri Nations Series squad. He played against the Wallabies at Newlands, which the Springboks won 26 to 22. He also played against the All Blacks at Loftus Versfeld, and was a reserve in another match against Australia at Suncorp Stadium, both of which the Springboks lost.

Van Heerden had a good 2007 Super 14 campaign with the Bulls as the team's specialist fetcher. His best game was in the Bulls’ 92–3 win against the Reds at Loftus, scoring two tries in the process. This led to him being selected into the Springboks. In July 2007, Van Heerden played his first Test in four years, against the Wallabies in Sydney. He played very well in this match, being regarded as the best Bok forward, albeit in a second string Springbok XV. He was equally impressive in the match against the All Blacks in Christchurch a week later. These performances lead to his inclusion in the Springbok's victorious 2007 Rugby World Cup squad.

On 16 May 2008 it was confirmed that he would join Guinness Premiership side Saracens in November 2008 following his Currie Cup commitments with the Bulls. He scored a try on his debut for Saracens in a 27–14 defeat against London Irish at the Madejski Stadium on 23 November.

On 18 March 2010, it was confirmed that Saracens had released him to return to South Africa where he would play for the Lions. This was a surprise, as Saracens had indicated he would see out the season with the club. In his first super rugby season back in South Africa he broke his arm but was back for the first match of the Curriecup. Unfortunately he broke his arm again in exactly the same place in this match, putting him out for several weeks. His father is former Springbok Lock Moaner van Heerden.

== Honours ==
- 2007 Super Rugby winner (Bulls)
- 2007 Rugby World Cup winner (Springboks)
- 2011 Currie Cup winner (Golden Lions)
