= Lawrence Sephaka =

South African rugby union player

- Born: Lawrence Dumisani Sephaka; 8 August 1978 (age 48) Johannesburg, South Africa
- Height: 5 ft 10 in (1.78 m)
- Weight: 238 lb (108 kg)

Rugby union career
Senior career
Years	Team	Apps	(Points)
- Toulon
Provincial / State sides
Years	Team	Apps	(Points)
2001–2010	Golden Lions		
Super Rugby
Years	Team	Apps	(Points)
2001–2009	Lions		
International career
Years	Team	Apps	(Points)
2001–2006	South Africa	24	(0)

Lawrence Sephaka (born 8 August 1978 in Johannesburg, South Africa) is a South African retired rugby union footballer. His usual position was at prop, preferably loosehead.

He played in Super Rugby for the Lions.

In 2007 he played in Rugby Pro D2, the second level of the French professional league, for Toulon, an ambitious side which signed international stars such as George Gregan, Victor Matfield, Anton Oliver, and Andrew Mehrtens in a drive for promotion.

He has in the past competed for the Golden Lions in the domestic Currie Cup competition.

Sephaka made his international debut for the Springboks on 1 December 2001 in a match against the United States at Robertson Stadium in Houston. The Springboks won the game 43 points to 20.

He next played for the Springboks in 2002, earning six international caps that year. He played against Samoa on 6 June at Loftus Versfeld in Pretoria, which South Africa won 60 points to 18.

He was subsequently included in the Springboks' 2002 Tri Nations Series squad. He played in all four of the Tri Nations games that season against Australia and the All Blacks. He earned another cap at the end of the year in November, in the 10 to 30 loss against France at Stade Vélodrome in Marseille.

In 2003 he played nine times for the Springboks, the first of which was the 29 to 25 victory over Scotland at King's Park in Durban. He played in the subsequent test against the Scottish and then in all four of the 2003 Tri Nations Series matches.

Sephaka was part of South Africa's 2003 Rugby World Cup squad for Australia. He played in three matches at the world cup, the 72 to six victory over Uruguay and the six to 25 loss against England, both of which were contested at Perth's Subiaco Oval, as well as the 46 to 19 win over Georgia at Sydney Football Stadium.

In 2005 he played in a mid-year test against France before going onto play in the Tri Nations. After the first match against Australia, he was then controversially dropped from the starting lineup for the subsequent match against the Wallabies. He however played in two tests at the end of the year, against Scotland and Wales. He was included in the Springboks' 2006 Tri Nations Series squad.
