= Ashwin Willemse =

South African rugby union player

- Born: 8 September 1981 (age 45) Caledon, Western Cape
- Height: 1.90 m (6 ft 3 in)
- Weight: 92 kg (14 st 7 lb)
- School: Swartberg Secondary

Rugby union career
- Position: Wing
Provincial / State sides
Years	Team	Apps	(Points)
2000–2001	Boland Kavaliers		
2006–2007	Golden Lions		
- Correct as of 3 July 2016
Super Rugby
Years	Team	Apps	(Points)
2003–2006	Cats	24	(15)
2007–2009	Lions	7	(30)
- Correct as of 3 July 2016
International career
Years	Team	Apps	(Points)
2003–2007	South Africa	19	(25)

Ashwin Willemse (born 8 September 1981 in Caledon, Cape Province) is a retired South African rugby union player. He played at wing for the national team, the Springboks.

After winning an IRB Under-21 World Cup gold medal for South Africa in 2002, the winger set about gaining Super 12 experience with the Cats. Willemse's pace, speed and power contributed to him being selected for his test debut against Scotland. He was included in the South Africa 2003 Rugby World Cup squad and scored a solo try against Samoa. Willemse's achievements of 2003 were topped by scooping up three awards at the annual SA Rugby function - Player of the Year, Most Promising Player of the Year and Players' Player of the Year.

Willemse was injured for most of the 2004–2006 seasons. However, he was selected for the Springbok squad during the 2007 international season and Tri nations, and was selected for the 2007 Rugby World Cup squad. He then signed a two-year contract with Biarritz Olympique, joining a host of other Springboks choosing to continue their careers abroad after RWC 2007.

Willemse subsequently retired from international rugby stating "there are no controversial issues around my decision at all. I love the team, and the guys are exceptional. It was such a breath of fresh air being able to return to the Lions after some time overseas last year, and it has been so exciting. I have been able to play the best rugby of my career with the Lions, and I will miss each and every one of my teammates. The time, however, has come for me to move onto the next phase of my life".

In 2012, Willemse launched the GreenSmile Foundation. It is dedicated to helping educate and create better opportunities for children from socio-economic hardships. This was also the same year that Lions4Life premiered, it was produced by GreenSmile Productions with Willemse named as Executive Producer.

In May 2018, while providing live analysis, Willemse walked off the SuperSport set, as a result of conflicts with his co-presenters, Nick Mallett and Naas Botha. Willemse insinuated that his actions were a result of racism on the part of Mallett and Botha. Willemse requested an investigation by the South African Human Rights Commission, which was started in 2019 and closed in June 2023 due to Willemse's apparent failure to respond to further questions.

In May 2024, 6 years after the SuperSport incident, Willemse's return to television was announced with a new show entitled BÔll & Ôll on the channel EExtra.
