= Jaco van der Westhuyzen =

South African rugby union player

- Born: 6 April 1978 (age 48) Nelspruit, South Africa
- Height: 1.80 m (5 ft 11 in)
- Weight: 88 kg (13 st 12 lb)

Rugby union career
- Position(s): Fullback, Fly-half, Wing
Amateur team(s)
Years	Team	Apps	(Points)
1997	University of Natal		
Senior career
Years	Team	Apps	(Points)
- Sharks
- Pumas
2001–03	Bulls	5	(2)
2003–04	Leicester Tigers	11	(25)
2004–10	NEC Green Rockets		
2010	Bulls		
International career
Years	Team	Apps	(Points)
2000–2010	South Africa	32	(25)

Jaco van der Westhuyzen (born 6 April 1978) is a South African former professional rugby union footballer who played fly-half or fullback.

== Early life ==
Born in Groblersdal, Mpumalanga province, South Africa, van der Westhuyzen was educated at Ben Viljoen High School, Groblersdal, van der Westhuyzen studied law at the University of Natal (Pietermaritzburg) and through UNISA. Van der Westhuyzen played for South Africa A, U23s and U21s (helping them to the Sanzar title in Argentina in 1999), as well as the South African Barbarians in 2001 and South Africa Schools in 1996. He made his debut in the Super 12 as an 18 year old in 1997.

== Professional rugby career ==
He made his name with the Sharks as a fly-half starting at U21 level in 1997. Played in both the Currie Cup (scoring 96 points in 21 games) and then making his Super 12 debut in 1997 as a 19-year-old. He was unable to cement himself a place in the starting line-up, and moved north to the Mpumalanga Pumas where he came under the eye of ex-Springbok centre Danie Gerber.

Van der Westhuyzen was first capped for the Springboks in the 2000 Tri Nations tournament against New Zealand as a replacement, but a knee injury after his first two tests curtailed his international career.

Van der Westhuyzen then moved to the Pretoria-based Blue Bulls in 2001 helping them to the Vodacom Cup in his first year then, still playing as a fly-half, claiming the Currie Cup title in 2002. He was named the South African Super 12 Player of the Year following the Bulls' sixth-place finish in the competition – the highest of any South African team in 2003. He returned to the Bulls in 2006 after stints at Leicester Tigers and NEC Green Rockets. He has been played mainly at fullback since his return; Morné Steyn and Derick Hougaard are currently well-established as the team's fly-halves.

He scored his debut international try against Samoa in Brisbane in the 2003 Rugby World Cup, after he was called into the South African squad as a late replacement.

In 2006, van der Westhuyzen was part of the Springboks side that was thrashed 49–0 by the Wallabies, in their opening Tri Nations match. van der Westhuyzen made many handling errors during the match, leading to Butch James to be brought into the side. One of van der Westhuyzen's errors involved him dropping the ball and after in the bounced, kick it, claiming to the referee that he was attempting a drop goal. Later, van der Westhuyzen claimed he "needed to think of something".

=== Leicester Tigers ===
After the 2003 Rugby World Cup, he joined Leicester Tigers, where he initially was brought in as a fullback to replace Tim Stimpson. However, he was soon switched to fly-half, following in the tradition of Joel Stransky. His performances earned him a recall to the Springbok side in 2004. Van Der Westhuyzen made a total of 12 appearances, scoring 33 points for the Tigers.

=== NEC Green Rockets ===
Despite attempts by Leicester to keep him at the club, he decided to honour a contract he had signed with NEC Green Rockets in Japan and was registered from 2004 to 2009.

=== Return to Bulls ===
In 2010, van der Westhuyzen rejoined Bulls for the 2010 Super 14 season.

== Beliefs ==
Van der Westhuyzen is a devout Christian. He claims his knee injury was miraculously healed by prayer when he visited T. B. Joshua, pastor of Synagogue Church of All Nations in Lagos, Nigeria. According to him, he was cured from a career threatening knee ligament injury immediately following the prayer.

== Achievements ==
- SANZAR u21 Championship with South Africa Under-21 1999.
- Currie Cup 2002 with Blue Bulls.
- Superrugby winner 2007 & 2010 (Bulls)
- Tri Nations 2004, with South Africa.

31 Springbok caps. 2003 Super rugby player of the year.
