= Louis Koen (rugby union) =

South African rugby union player (born 1975)

- Full name: Louis Johannes Koen
- Born: 7 July 1975 (age 51) Cape Town, South Africa
- Height: 5 ft 9 in (175 cm)
- Weight: 13 st 6 lb (188 lb; 85 kg)
- School: Paarl Gymnasium
- University: Stellenbosch University

Rugby union career
- Position: Fly-half
Senior career
Years	Team	Apps	(Points)
1996–1999	Stormers	12	(86)
1996–1999	Western Province	46	(577)
2000–2002	Cats	28	(330)
2000–2002	Lions	28	(391)
2003	Bulls	11	(139)
2003–2005	Narbonne	10	(67)
2010	Boland Cavaliers	1	(12)
International career
Years	Team	Apps	(Points)
2000–2003	South Africa	15	(147)

Louis Johannes Koen (born 7 July 1975 in Cape Town, South Africa) is a South-African rugby union player who played for the Springboks, until 2003, when he moved abroad following the World Cup.

Effective at either fly half or full back, his career began with Western Province, before his move to the Lions and later the Bulls. He was part of the Western Province team that won the Currie Cup in 1997, contributing immensely with his accurate goal kicking. It was this dependable boot that led to his recall to the Springbok team in 2003 after a two-year absence, but following a difficult tournament and South Africa's disappointing exit in the quarter-finals, Koen was signed by Narbonne in France. After two years dogged by injury, Koen moved back to Western Province as only the second full-time kicking coach in South Africa. In 2010 he was recalled out of retirement to play one Currie Cup First Division match for the Boland Cavaliers against the Valke.

== Career ==
=== Provincial ===
- Lions (South Africa) – 28 caps
- Western Province (South Africa) – 46 caps
- Boland Cavaliers – 1 cap

=== Super Rugby ===
- Stormers (South Africa) – 12 caps (86 points- 2 tries, 20 conversions, 11 penalty goals, 1 drop goal)
- Cats (South Africa) – 28 caps (330 points- 3 tries, 42 conversions, 74 penalty goals, 3 drop goals)
- Bulls (South Africa) – 11 caps (139 points- 17 conversions, 28 penalty goals, 7 drop goals)

=== Club ===
- Stellenbosch

=== National team ===
He made his debut for South Africa against Australia on 8 July 2000.

He played four matches in the 2003 Rugby World Cup. During the game between South Africa and Samoa, as Koen prepared to take a conversion, a drunk rugby fan ran onto the field and attempted to tackle Koen, knocking himself out. Koen succeeded with the conversion.

== Achievements ==
=== With the Springboks ===
(as of 31 December 2005)

- 15 caps
- 0 tries, 23 conversions, 31 penalties, 2 drops
- 145 points
- Selections per season : 1 in 2000, 3 in 2001, 11 in 2003.
- Participation at the World Cup 2003 (4 matches).

=== With club and province ===
- Scored 577 points for Western Province (46 matches, 11 tries, 123 conversions, 92 penalty goals) (1996–99)
- Scored 391 points for Lions (28 matches, 5 tries, 87 conversions, 60 penalty goals, 4 drop goals) (2000–02)
- Scored 12 points for Boland Cavaliers (1 match, 3 conversions, 2 penalty goals) (2010)

== Coaching ==
In February 2022, Koen, then the South African Rugby Union's high-performance manager, was appointed to assist Heyneke Meyer with the Houston SaberCats.

In March 2023, Koen was appointed interim coach of the South Africa women's national rugby union team.
