= Danie Coetzee =

South African rugby union footballer

- Born: Danie Coetzee; 2 September 1977 (age 49) Harrismith, South Africa
- Height: 1.85 m (6 ft 1 in)
- Weight: 110 kg (17 st 5 lb; 243 lb)
- School: Harrismith High School
- University: University of the Free State

Rugby union career
- Position: Hooker
- Current team: London Irish
Senior career
Years	Team	Apps	(Points)
–	London Irish		
Provincial / State sides
Years	Team	Apps	(Points)
2000	Free State Cheetahs	5	(0)
2001–2002	Blue Bulls	35	(30)
Super Rugby
Years	Team	Apps	(Points)
2002–2004	Bulls	32	(0)
International career
Years	Team	Apps	(Points)
2002–2006	South Africa	52	(5)

Danie Coetzee (born 2 September 1977 in Harrismith, South Africa) is a South African rugby union footballer. His usual position is at hooker, and he has played for the Springboks. He played for the Bulls in the international Super 12 competition as well as the Blue Bulls in the Currie Cup, and played for London Irish for five seasons between 2005 and 2010, retiring in 2010.

Coetzee made his international debut for South Africa on 6 July 2002 in a match against Samoa at Loftus Versfeld in Pretoria, which the Springboks won 60-18.

In June 2003 he played in two tests against the Scottish in South Africa, which were both won by the Springboks. He subsequently played in the following test against Argentina in Port Elizabeth in which he scored a try.

After playing in the 2003 Tri Nations Series against Australia and the All Blacks, he was included in the Springboks 2003 Rugby World Cup squad. He then played in four World Cup matches in Australia. He played in two end-of-year tests in 2004, against Scotland and Argentina. He was included in the Springboks' 2006 Tri Nations Series squad.

Title=Child rudolf coetzee
