= Bakkies Botha =

South Africa international rugby union former player

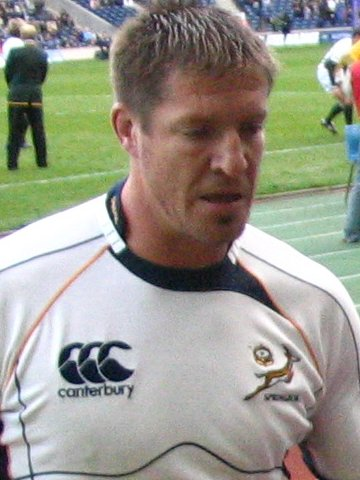
- Bakkies Botha, dressed in the Springbok change kit after a pre-match warm up
- Born: John Philip Botha; 22 September 1979 (age 47) Newcastle, South Africa
- Height: 2.02 m (6 ft 7 1/2 in)
- Weight: 124 kg (273 lb; 19 st 7 lb)
- School: HTS Middelburg and Vereeniging HTS, South Africa

Rugby union career
- Position: Lock
Senior career
Years	Team	Apps	(Points)
2011–2015	Toulon	73	(20)
- Correct as of 30 January 2015
Provincial / State sides
Years	Team	Apps	(Points)
1999–2000	Falcons	22	(12)
2001–2011	Blue Bulls	53	(50)
- Correct as of 24 March 2015
Super Rugby
Years	Team	Apps	(Points)
2002–2011	Bulls	100	(55)
- Correct as of 25 November 2013
International career
Years	Team	Apps	(Points)
2002–2014	South Africa (test)	85	(35)
2010	South Africa (tour)	1	(5)
2014	Springbok XV	1	(5)
2001–2003	South Africa 'A'	6	(5)
2001	South Africa Under-23	3	(5)
1998	South African Schools		
- Correct as of 17 November 2014
Medal record
Men's Rugby union
Representing South Africa
Rugby World Cup
Gold medal – first place	2007 France	Squad

John Philip Botha (born 22 September 1979), known as Bakkies Botha, is a South African former professional rugby union player who played as a lock. He was a member of the South Africa team that won the 2007 Rugby World Cup in France in addition to winning two Tri Nations titles in 2004 and 2009. Botha played for RC Toulonnais in the Top 14, the Blue Bulls in the Currie Cup and the Bulls in Super Rugby. Botha was a member of the Toulon squad which won the 2013, 2014 and 2015 Heineken Cup/European Rugby Champions Cup Finals. He became widely associated with fellow international lock Victor Matfield for their highly successful onfield partnership with the Bulls and the Springboks.

== Career ==
Botha played for the South Africa under-19 and under-23 sides before being chosen for the South African "A" team that toured Europe at the end of 2001. The following year he was selected for the full national team, the Springboks and made his debut against France in Marseille on 9 September 2002, a game South Africa lost 30–10.

Botha and Victor Matfield formed a partnership at lock for both their province and country. Botha is known as one of the toughest locks in world rugby.

His confrontational style resulted in a number of controversial incidents. He received a yellow card for stamping in his debut against France. Then in August 2003 he was accused of biting and then eye-gouging Wallabies hooker Brendan Cannon, and although there was insufficient video evidence to consider the biting charge, and he was found not guilty of gouging, he was still suspended for eight weeks for "attacking the face". Cannon has given interviews stating that Botha both bit and gouged him, and Botha himself gave an interview to The Times saying that his ban was "for an eye-gouge".

In April 2009 he received a three-match ban for striking Phil Waugh in a Super 14 match,

In June 2009 whilst playing for South Africa in the second test against the British & Irish Lions, Botha was banned for two weeks for a dangerous charge on the Lions prop Adam Jones in a ruck which left Jones with a dislocated shoulder requiring surgery. Botha's appeal against the ban was dismissed, and he missed the third test against the Lions. The injured Jones himself later said Botha should not have been banned, as it was not malicious. The whole South African team wore armbands with 'Justice 4' (a reference to Botha's shirt number) written on them in the third test against the Lions, in support of Botha and in protest over perceived inconsistencies in the citing process, for which the South African Rugby Union was charged with bringing the game into disrepute by the International Rugby Board.

In May 2010, Botha was suspended for four weeks following a dangerous clearout of wing Gio Aplon during the Bulls' Super 14 game against the Stormers. This was Botha's first match as captain of the Bulls; the suspension meant Botha missed the playoffs.

On 10 July 2010, in the first test of the 2010 Tri Nations Series against New Zealand, Botha was suspended from all rugby for 9 weeks for head-butting All Black halfback Jimmy Cowan, ruling him out of the remainder of the 2010 Tri Nations Series.

Botha played in three winning Currie Cup finals with the Bulls (2002, 2004 and 2009), and was also a member of the victorious Bulls teams in the Super 14 in 2007, 2009 and 2010. He also won the Heineken Cup/European Rugby Champions Cup with Toulon in 2013, 2014 and 2015. He is now one of the most decorated players in world rugby.

Botha was nicknamed 'the enforcer' and 'the butcher'. He is considered one of the dirtiest rugby players of the professional era. Journalist Mark Keohane has argued that his disciplinary record in international matches was not among the very worst. Coach Bernard Laporte said he was the greatest player he ever coached.

=== Honours ===
Blue Bulls

- Vodacom Cup: 2001
- Currie Cup: 2002, 2004, 2006 (draw), 2009

Bulls

- Super Rugby: 2007, 2009, 2010

Toulon

- Heineken Cup European Champions/European Rugby Champions Cup: 2013, 2014, 2015
- Top 14 French League : 2014

South Africa

- World Cup: 2007
- Tri-Nations: 2004, 2009
- British & Irish Lions series win: 2009
- Mandela Challenge Plate: 2005, 2009
- Freedom Cup: 2004, 2009
- Prince William Cup: 2007, 2008, 2010

== Activities in retirement ==
As of 2019 Botha runs a butchery business in South Africa called "Bakkies the Butcher".
