= Richard Bands =

South African rugby union player

- Born: Richard Edward Bands; 25 March 1974 (age 52) Mafikeng, South Africa
- Height: 6 ft (1.8 m)
- Weight: 18.2 st (116 kg)
- School: Lichtenburg High School

Rugby union career
- Position(s): Hooker, prop
- Current team: retired
Amateur team(s)
Years	Team	Apps	(Points)
1994	Stellaland		
- Correct as of 30 June 2014
Provincial / State sides
Years	Team	Apps	(Points)
2001–2007	Blue Bulls		((?))
- Correct as of 30 June 2014
Super Rugby
Years	Team	Apps	(Points)
2002–2003	Bulls	20	(0)
- Correct as of 30 June 2014
- Correct as of 30 June 2014

Richard Edward "Richie" Bands (born 25 March 1974 in Mafikeng) is a former South African rugby union test player. He was part of the Springboks squad for the 2003 Rugby World Cup and is fondly remembered in the South African rugby community for his memorable try for South Africa against the All Blacks in the 2003 Tri Nations Series.

Although he started his professional career as a hooker, he usually played as prop. During his career he was part of the Blue Bulls provincial team in the Currie Cup (South Africa's premier domestic rugby union competition) and the Bulls franchise in the Super 14 competition.

== Provincial ==
Bands made his provincial debut in 1994. After a break of several years he resumed his career 2001 when he joined Blue Bulls. He was part of Currie Cup winning teams from 2002 to 2004. After that numerous injuries prevented him from playing on the highest level. He retired from 1st class rugby by the end of the Super 14 season in 2008.

== Super Rugby ==
It was in 2002 that Bands made his Super rugby debut, in a match for the Bulls against New Zealand team, the Chiefs. He continued playing for the Bulls until 2005. During his Super Rugby career he scored several tries, an unusual feature for a prop.

== International ==
In 2003 he made his test debut for the Springboks against Scotland. During the 2003 Tri Nations Series match in Dunedin against the All Blacks he scored his famous try when he started his charge from the half-way line and effortlessly brushed away Carlos Spencer on his way to the try line. Grant Nesbitt's commentary of the try is one of the most popular phrases used when describing a try: "He's gonna have a go at Spencer! Get outta the road! That's one of the best tries you'll ever see from a prop forward, superb!" Later this season he played in four matches for the Springboks in the 2003 Rugby World Cup held in Australia. He scored a try in the win over Uruguay in South Africa's opening pool match. Altogether he played for the Springboks eleven times.

== Legal dispute with SA Rugby ==
In 2008 the Johannesburg Labour Court ended the protracted legal conflict between SA Rugby and players Victor Matfield, Richard Bands and Christo Bezuidenhout, which started in 2004, when the CCMA awarded the three players compensation for loss of earnings, when their fixed-term contracts were not renewed despite their strong performances in the 2003 Rugby World Cup. Former Springbok coach Rudolf Straeuli promised the three Springboks contracts before he was sacked. The Labour Court ruled that Straeuli's promise that the players were part of his future plans was not enough to create a reasonable expectation.

== Accomplishments ==
- Currie Cup Winner in 2003, 2003, 2004
- SA Rugby Player of the Year nominee, 2003
- SuperSport Try of the Year, 2003
- 11 Springbok caps (Win ratio: 6-5-0)
