= List of Australia national rugby union team records =

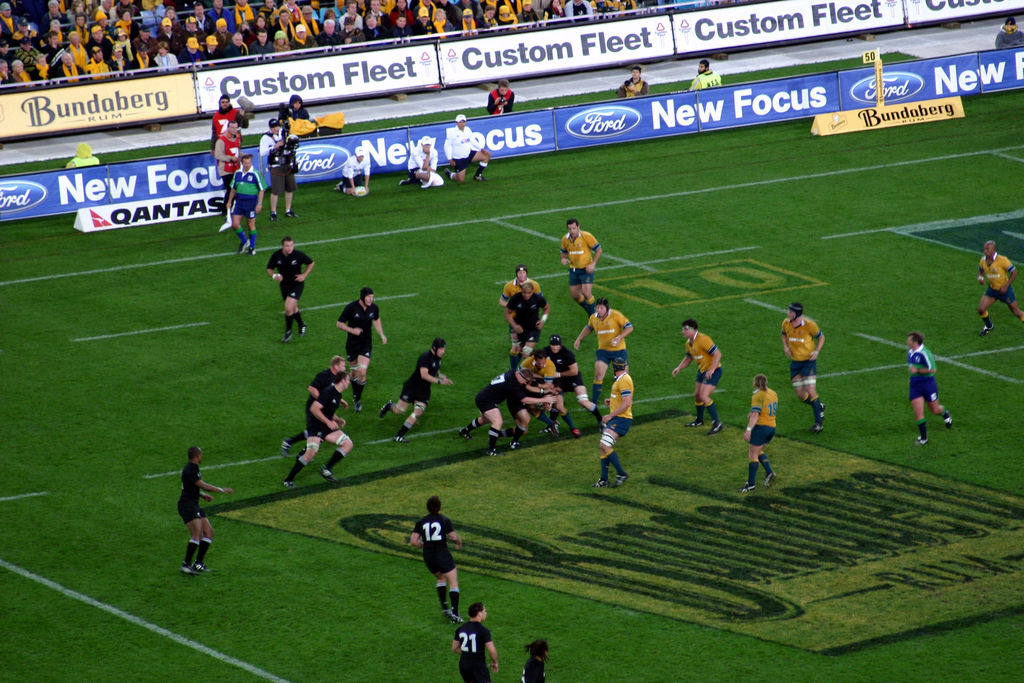
Australia (in gold), playing against New Zealand

Australia have competed in international rugby union matches since 1889. They compete in the annual Rugby Championship series and have appeared at every Rugby World Cup, winning the tournament in 1991 and 1999 and finishing second in 2003 and 2015. The records listed below only include performances in Test matches. The top five are listed in each category (except when there is a tie for the last place among the five, when all the tied record holders are noted).

== Team records ==
=== Greatest winning margins ===
Opponent (Note: Updated to 22 November 2026. However, ESPNscrum statistics are until 2016.)	Venue	Competition	Date	Score	Margin	Ref.
Namibia	Adelaide Oval, Adelaide	2003 Rugby World Cup	25 October 2003	142–0	142	
Japan	Stade de Gerland, Lyon	2007 Rugby World Cup	8 September 2007	91–3	88	
Spain	Campo Universitario, Madrid	2001 Australia tour of Europe	1 November 2001	92–10	82	
Romania	Lang Park, Brisbane	2003 Rugby World Cup	18 October 2003	90–8	82	
England	Lang Park, Brisbane	1998 England tour of Australasia and South Africa	6 June 1998	76–0	76	
Tonga	Canberra Stadium, Canberra	1999 Rugby World Cup Qualification – Third Round	22 September 1998	74–0	74	
Western Samoa	Sydney Football Stadium, Sydney	1994 Western Samoa tour of Australia	6 August 1994	73–3	70	
Samoa	Stadium Australia, Sydney	2005 June International	11 June 2005	74–7	67	
Canada	Ballymore Stadium, Brisbane	1996 Canada tour of Australia	29 June 1996	74–9	65	
United States	Wellington Regional Stadium, Wellington	2011 Rugby World Cup	23 September 2011	67–5	62	
Uruguay	Villa Park, Birmingham	2015 Rugby World Cup	27 September 2015	65–3	62	

=== Greatest losing margins ===
Opponent	Venue	Competition	Date	Score	Margin	Ref.
South Africa	Ellis Park Stadium, Johannesburg	2008 Tri Nations Series	30 August 2008	53–8	45	
Argentina	Estadio Brigadier General Estanislao López, Santa Fe	2024 Rugby Championship	7 September 2024	67–27	40	
South Africa	Loftus Versfeld Stadium, Pretoria	1997 Tri Nations Series	23 August 1997	61–22	39	
New Zealand	Stadium Australia, Sydney	2020 Tri Nations Series	31 October 2020	5–43	38	
New Zealand	Athletic Park, Wellington	1996 Tri Nations Series	6 July 1996	43–6	37	
New Zealand	Eden Park, Auckland	2019 Rugby World Cup warm-up match	17 August 2019	36–0	36	
New Zealand	Eden Park, Auckland	1972 Australia tour of New Zealand and Fiji	16 September 1972	38–3	35	
New Zealand	Eden Park, Auckland	2021 Rugby Championship	14 August 2021	57–22	35	
Wales	Parc Olympique Lyonnais, Décines-Charpieu	2023 Rugby World Cup	24 September 2023	40–6	34	
Argentina	Estadio San Juan del Bicentenario, San Juan	2022 Rugby Championship	13 August 2022	48–17	31	
South Africa	Loftus Versfeld Stadium, Pretoria	2023 Rugby Championship	8 July 2023	43–12	31	
New Zealand	Melbourne Cricket Ground, Melbourne	2023 Rugby Championship	29 July 2023	7–38	31	
New Zealand	Eden Park, Auckland	2026 Bledisloe Cup	10 October 2026	50–19	31	

== Player records ==
=== Appearances and caps ===
Most appearances
Apps	Player	Period
154	James Slipper	2010–2026
139	George Gregan	1994–2007
129	Stephen Moore	2005–2017
125	Michael Hooper	2012–2023
121	Adam Ashley-Cooper	2005–2019

Most appearances as captain
Apps	Player	Period
69	Michael Hooper	2014–2023
59	George Gregan	2001–2007
55	John Eales	1996–2001
36	Nick Farr-Jones	1988–1992
32	Harry Wilson	2024-

=== Tries and points ===
Most tries
Tries	Player	Period
64	David Campese	1982–1996
40	Chris Latham	1998–2007
39	Adam Ashley-Cooper	2005–2019
37	Israel Folau	2013–2018
34	Drew Mitchell	2005–2016

Most points
Points	Player	Period
911	Michael Lynagh	1984–1995
878	Matt Burke	1993–2004
698	Matt Giteau	2002–2016
670	Bernard Foley	2013–2022
489	Stirling Mortlock	2000–2009

=== Match records ===
==== Points ====
Player	Venue	Competition	Opponent	Date	Score	Score involvements				Points	Ref.
Player	Venue	Competition	Opponent	Date	Score	Tries	Con.	Pen.	Drop.	Points	Ref.
Mat Rogers	Adelaide Oval, Adelaide	2003 Rugby World Cup	Namibia	25 October 2003	142–0	2	16	0	0	42	
Matt Burke	Ballymore Stadium, Brisbane	1996 Canada tour of Australia	Canada	29 June 1996	74–9	3	9	2	0	39	
Elton Flatley	Lang Park, Brisbane	2003 Rugby World Cup	Romania	18 October 2003	90–8	1	11	1	0	30	
Stirling Mortlock	Docklands Stadium, Melbourne	Mandela Challenge Plate	South Africa	8 July 2000	44–23	2	2	5	0	29	
James O'Connor	Stade de France, Saint-Denis	2010 Autumn International	France	27 November 2010	16–59	1	6	4	0	29	
Bernard Foley	Twickenham Stadium, London	2015 Rugby World Cup	England	3 October 2015	33–13	2	3	4	0	28	
Michael Lynagh	Ballymore Stadium, Brisbane	1995 Argentina tour of Australia	Argentina	30 April 1995	53–7	2	3	4	0	28	
Matt Giteau	Stade de la Mosson, Montpellier	2007 Rugby World Cup	Fiji	23 September 2007	55–12	2	4	3	0	27	
Matt Burke	Sydney Football Stadium, Sydney	1998 Scotland tour of Australia and Fiji	Scotland	13 June 1998	45–3	1	4	4	0	25	
Matt Burke	Millennium Stadium, Cardiff	1999 Rugby World Cup final	France	6 November 1999	35–12	0	2	7	0	25	
Matt Burke	Docklands Stadium, Melbourne	2001 British & Irish Lions tour of Australia	British and Irish Lions	7 July 2001	35–14	1	1	6	0	25	
Ben Donaldson	Stade de France, Seint-Denis	2023 Rugby World Cup	Georgia	9 September 2023	35–15	2	3	3	0	25	
Chris Latham	Adelaide Oval, Adelaide	2003 Rugby World Cup	Namibia	25 October 2003	142–0	5	0	0	0	25	

==== Tries ====
Player	Venue	Competition	Opponent	Date	Score	Tries	Ref.
Chris Latham	Adelaide Oval, Adelaide	2003 Rugby World Cup	Namibia	25 October 2003	142–0	5	
Greg Cornelsen	Eden Park, Auckland	1978 Australia tour of New Zealand	New Zealand	9 September 1978	30–16	4	
David Campese	Sydney Cricket Ground, Sydney	1983 United States tour of Australia	United States	9 July 1983	49–3	4	
Jason Little	Canberra Stadium, Canberra	1999 Rugby World Cup Qualification – Third Round	Tonga	22 September 1998	74–0	4	
Chris Latham	Ballymore Stadium, Brisbane	2000 Argentina of Australia	Argentina	17 June 2000	53–6	4	
Lote Tuqiri	Docklands Stadium, Melbourne	2005 June International	Italy	25 June 2005	69–21	4	
Twenty three players						3	

== See also ==
- List of Australia national rugby union team test match results
