= List of international rugby union tries by David Campese =

David Campese is a former Australia rugby union fullback and winger. Campese is considered to be a once in a generation player, and since his retirement has held the most test tries for the Wallabies with sixty-four. Between 1982 and 1998. Campese held the most international tries scored by any player, being overtaken by Japanese winger Daisuke Ohata, the current record-holder. Originally Campese overtook Scottish winger Ian Smith, who, with twenty-four international tries, held the world record from the 1930s. However, when Campese overtook Smith's record (1987), he was an active player, and grew the record out to a significant margin by his retirement (1996).

In August 2016 South African winger Bryan Habana scored his sixty-fifth try, overtaking Campese's record. Habana was just the second international player to overtake Campese.

Currently David Campese is the third highest international try-scorer in the world, and is twenty-four tries ahead of the second-most try-scoring Wallaby Chris Latham with forty.

== International tries ==
=== List of International tries ===
International tries
No.	Opponent	Location	Competition	Date	Result	Ref.
1	New Zealand	Lancaster Park, Christchurch	1982 Australia tour of New Zealand	14 August 1982	23–16	
2	New Zealand	Athletic Park, Wellington	1982 Australia tour of New Zealand	28 August 1982	16–19	
3	United States	Sydney Cricket Ground, Sydney	1983 United States tour of Canada and Australia	9 July 1983	49–3	
4	United States	Sydney Cricket Ground, Sydney	1983 United States tour of Canada and Australia	9 July 1983	49–3	
5	United States	Sydney Cricket Ground, Sydney	1983 United States tour of Canada and Australia	9 July 1983	49–3	
6	United States	Sydney Cricket Ground, Sydney	1983 United States tour of Canada and Australia	9 July 1983	49–3	
7	Argentina	Sydney Cricket Ground, Sydney	1983 Argentina tour of Australia	7 August 1983	29–13	
8	Fiji	National Stadium, Suva	1984 Australia tour of Fiji	9 June 1984	3–16	
9	New Zealand	Sydney Cricket Ground, Sydney	1984 New Zealand tour of Australia	18 August 1984	24–25	
10	Scotland	Murrayfield Stadium, Edinburgh	1984 Australia tour of Great Britain and Ireland	8 December 1984	12–37	
11	Scotland	Murrayfield Stadium, Edinburgh	1984 Australia tour of Great Britain and Ireland	8 December 1984	12–37	
12	Fiji	Sydney Cricket Ground, Sydney	1985 Fiji tour of Australia	17 August 1985	31–9	
13	Fiji	Sydney Cricket Ground, Sydney	1985 Fiji tour of Australia	17 August 1985	31–9	
14	Italy	Ballymore Stadium, Brisbane	1986 Italy tour of Australia	1 June 1986	39–18	
15	Italy	Ballymore Stadium, Brisbane	1986 Italy tour of Australia	1 June 1986	39–18	
16	France	Sydney Cricket Ground, Sydney	1986 France tour of Argentina, Australia and New Zealand	21 June 1986	27–14	
17	Argentina	Ballymore Stadium, Brisbane	1986 Argentina tour of Australia	6 July 1986	39–19	
18	Argentina	Sydney Cricket Ground, Sydney	1986 Argentina tour of Australia	12 July 1986	26–0	
19	Argentina	Sydney Cricket Ground, Sydney	1986 Argentina tour of Australia	12 July 1986	26–0	
20	New Zealand	Athletic Park, Wellington	1986 Australia tour of New Zealand	9 August 1986	12–13	
21	New Zealand	Eden Park, Auckland	1986 Australia tour of New Zealand	6 September 1986	9–22	
22	England	Concord Oval, Sydney^{(P1)}	1987 Rugby World Cup	23 May 1987	19–6	
23	United States	Ballymore Stadium, Brisbane^{(P1)}	1987 Rugby World Cup	31 May 1987	47–12	
24	Japan	Concord Oval, Sydney^{(P1)}	1987 Rugby World Cup	3 June 1987	42–23	
25	France	Concord Oval, Sydney^{(SF)}	1987 Rugby World Cup	13 June 1987	24–30	
26	England	Concord Oval, Sydney	1988 England tour of Australia and Fiji	12 June 1988	28–8	
27	England	Twickenham Stadium, London	1988 Australia tour of Great Britain and Italy	5 November 1988	28–19	
28	Scotland	Murrayfield Stadium, Edinburgh	1988 Australia tour of Great Britain and Italy	19 November 1988	13–32	
29	Scotland	Murrayfield Stadium, Edinburgh	1988 Australia tour of Great Britain and Italy	19 November 1988	13–32	
30	Italy	Stadio Flaminio, Rome	1988 Australia tour of Great Britain and Italy	3 December 1988	6–55	
31	Italy	Stadio Flaminio, Rome	1988 Australia tour of Great Britain and Italy	3 December 1988	6–55	
32	Italy	Stadio Flaminio, Rome	1988 Australia tour of Great Britain and Italy	3 December 1988	6–55	
33	New Zealand	Eden Park, Auckland	1989 Australia tour of New Zealand	5 August 1989	24–12	
34	France	Stade de la Meinau, Strasbourg	1989 Australia tour of Canada and France	4 November 1989	15–32	
35	France	Ballymore Stadium, Brisbane	1990 France tour of Australia	24 June 1990	48–31	
36	France	Sydney Football Stadium, Sydney	1990 France tour of Australia	30 June 1990	19–28	
37	United States	Ballymore Stadium, Brisbane	1990 United States tour of Australia	8 July 1990	67–9	
38	Wales	Ballymore Stadium, Brisbane	1991 Wales tour of Australia	22 July 1991	63–6	
39	England	Sydney Football Stadium, Sydney	1991 England tour of Australia	27 July 1991	40–15	
40	England	Sydney Football Stadium, Sydney	1991 England tour of Australia	27 July 1991	40–15	
41	Argentina	Stradey Park, Llanelli (Wales)^{(P3)}	1991 Rugby World Cup	4 October 1991	19–32	
42	Argentina	Stradey Park, Llanelli (Wales)^{(P3)}	1991 Rugby World Cup	4 October 1991	19–32	
43	Wales	Cardiff Arms Park, Cardiff (Wales)^{(P3)}	1991 Rugby World Cup	12 October 1991	3–38	
44	Ireland	Lansdowne Road, Dublin (Ireland)^{(QF)}	1991 Rugby World Cup	20 October 1991	18–19	
45	Ireland	Lansdowne Road, Dublin (Ireland)^{(QF)}	1991 Rugby World Cup	20 October 1991	18–19	
46	New Zealand	Lansdowne Road, Dublin (Ireland)^{(SF)}	1991 Rugby World Cup	27 October 1991	16–6	
47	Scotland	Sydney Football Stadium, Sydney	1992 Scotland tour of Australia	13 June 1992	27–12	
48	Scotland	Sydney Football Stadium, Sydney	1992 Scotland tour of Australia	13 June 1992	27–12	
49	New Zealand	Sydney Football Stadium, Sydney	1992 New Zealand tour of Australia and South Africa	4 July 1992	16–15	
50	South Africa	Newlands Stadium, Cape Town	1992 Australia tour of South Africa	22 August 1992	3–26	
51	Ireland	Lansdowne Road, Dublin	1992 Australia tour of Great Britain and Ireland	31 October 1992	17–42	
52	Wales	Millennium Stadium, Cardiff	1992 Australia tour of Great Britain and Ireland	21 November 1992	6–23	
53	Tonga	Ballymore Stadium, Brisbane	1993 Tonga tour of Australia	4 July 1993	52–14	
54	Tonga	Ballymore Stadium, Brisbane	1993 Tonga tour of Australia	4 July 1993	52–14	
55	Canada	Kingsland, Calgary	1993 Australia tour of North America and France	9 October 1993	16–43	
56	Canada	Kingsland, Calgary	1993 Australia tour of North America and France	9 October 1993	16–43	
57	Canada	Kingsland, Calgary	1993 Australia tour of North America and France	9 October 1993	16–43	
58	Ireland	Ballymore Stadium, Brisbane	1994 Ireland tour of Australia	5 June 1994	33–13	
59	Italy	Olympic Park Stadium, Melbourne	1994 Italy tour of Australia	25 June 1994	20–7	
60	Western Samoa	Sydney Football Stadium, Sydney	1994 Western Samoa tour of Australia	6 August 1994	73–3	
61	Argentina	Ballymore Stadium, Brisbane	1995 Argentina tour of Australia	30 April 1995	53–7	
62	Argentina	Sydney Football Stadium, Sydney	1995 Argentina tour of Australia	6 May 1995	30–13	
63	Argentina	Sydney Football Stadium, Sydney	1995 Argentina tour of Australia	6 May 1995	30–13	
64	Canada	Ballymore Stadium, Brisbane	1996 Canada tour of Australia	29 June 1996	74–9	

=== Tries by opponent ===
International tries by opponent
Opponent	Matches					Tries	Try ratio
Opponent	P	W	D	L	%	Tries	Try ratio
Argentina	7	6	0	1	86	9	1.286
New Zealand	29	10	1	18	35	8	.276
United States	3	3	0	0	100	6	2.000
Scotland	4	4	0	0	100	6	1.500
Italy	6	6	0	0	100	6	1.000
England	8	6	0	2	75	5	.626
France	10	4	1	5	40	5	.500
Canada	3	3	0	0	100	4	1.333
Ireland	6	6	0	0	100	4	.667
Fiji	3	3	0	0	100	3	1.000
Wales	8	7	0	1	88	3	.376
Tonga	1	1	0	0	100	2	2.000
Japan	1	1	0	0	100	1	1.000
Western Samoa	2	2	0	0	100	1	.500
South Africa	7	4	0	3	57	1	.143
British & Irish Lions	3	1	0	2	33	0	.000
Total	101	67	2	32	66	64	.634
Opponent	P	W	D	L	%	Tries	Try ratio
Opponent	Matches					Tries	Try ratio

List of hat-tricks
Opponent	Location	Competition	Date	Result
United States^{4}	Sydney Cricket Ground, Sydney	1983 United States tour of Canada and Australia	9 July 1983	49–3
Italy	Stadio Flaminio, Rome	1988 Australia tour of Great Britain and Italy	3 December 1988	6–55
Canada	Kingsland, Calgary	1993 Australia tour of North America and France	9 October 1993	16–43

List of tries per year
Year	Caps	Tries	Try ratio
1982	3	2	.67
1983	7	5	.71
1984	8	4	.50
1985	2	2	1.00
1986	7	8	1.14
1987	7	4	.57
1988	8	7	.88
1989	6	2	.33
1990	6	3	.50
1991	10	9	.90
1992	8	6	.75
1993	8	5	.63
1994	6	3	.50
1995	6	3	.50
1996	9	1	.11
