= 2023 Rugby World Cup Pool C =

Pool C of the 2023 Rugby World Cup began on 9 September 2023 and concluded on 8 October 2023. The pool included two-times champions Australia, and automatic qualifiers Wales and Fiji. They were joined by Georgia (Europe 1) and Portugal (Final Qualifier Winner).

It is the fourth time in five Rugby World Cup tournament in which Australia, Wales and Fiji have been in the same group (2011 being the exception, where Wales and Fiji were still drawn together, and Wales faced Australia in the bronze medal match).

== Teams ==
Pos.	Team	Band	Confederation	Method of qualification	Date of qualification	Apps.	Last	Previous best performance	World Rugby Rankings	
Pos.	Team	Band	Confederation	Method of qualification	Date of qualification	Apps.	Last	Previous best performance	1 January 2020 (Note: The rankings of 1 January 2020 were used for seeding for the final draw.)	4 September 2023
C1	Wales	1	Europe	Top 3 in 2019 RWC pool	9 October 2019	10th	2019	Third place (1987)	4	10
C2	Australia	2	Oceania	Top 3 in 2019 RWC pool	9 October 2019	10th	2019	Winners (1991, 1999)	6	9
C3	Fiji	3	Oceania	Top 3 in 2019 RWC pool	11 October 2019	9th	2019	Quarter-finals (1987, 2007)	11	7
C4	Georgia	4 (Note: As the identity of the Europe 1 winners was not known at the time of the final draw, positions in the World Rugby Rankings were not taken into account, and the placeholder in the draw was automatically seeded into band 4.)	Europe	Europe 1	10 March 2022	6th	2019	Pool stage (2003, 2007, 2011, 2015, 2019)	14	11
C5	Portugal	5 (Note: As the identity of the Final Qualifier winners was not known at the time of the final draw, positions in the World Rugby Rankings were not taken into account, and the placeholder in the draw was automatically seeded into band 5.)	Europe	Final Qualifier	18 November 2022	2nd	2007	Pool stage (2007)	24	16

== Overview ==
Pool C got underway with Australia facing Georgia, in which Australia came out victorious with a 35–15 win. Ben Donaldson earned himself two tries while also succeeding in 3 conversions and 3 penalties, earning him player of the match. The following day, Wales faced Fiji in a pulsating encounter which Wales edged in a scoreline of 32–26. Tries were scored at both ends, but Elliot Dee's converted try in the 66th minute turned out to be what sealed victory for the Welsh, despite a late attempt at a fightback from Fiji which included a try from Mesake Doge in the 78th minute which was not converted. Portugal, making their first Rugby World Cup appearance since 2007, began their campaign the following week against Wales. Despite a valiant effort from the Portuguese, Wales came out winners with a scoreline of 28–8, courtesy of four Welsh tries. Australia faced Fiji for their second match of the pool the following day, as Fiji came out shock winners with a 15–22 victory in Saint-Étienne, with Josua Tuisova scoring their only try of the match.

After a six day rest in the pool, action returned with Georgia facing Portugal in Toulouse. After trailing 13–0, Portugal staged a comeback with two tries from Raffaele Storti, before a late try from Tengiz Zamtaradze drew Georgia level and denied Portugal a famous first World Cup victory, with Nuno Sousa Guedes missing a last minute penalty for the Portuguese as the match finished with a scoreline of 18–18. On the following day, Wales took on Australia, in which Wales scoring a record breaking 40 points to Australia's 6, a result which saw Wales become the first team to officially progress to the knockout stage in the 2023 Rugby World Cup, while leaving Australia in serious jeopardy of exiting the tournament at the pool stage for the first time in the Wallabies history.

The following weekend, on 30 September, Fiji and Georgia locked horns in Bordeaux with both sides still fighting to join Wales in the knockout stage. Despite trailing to first half penalties from Luka Matkava and Davit Niniashvili, Fiji fought back in the second half with tries from Waisea Nayacalevu and Vinaya Habosi to move to the brink of qualifying for the quarter-finals, while Georgia were confirmed elimination from the tournament despite Matkava's late penalty providing Georgia a losing bonus point. The next day, Australia played their last match of the pool against Portugal in a must win encounter for both sides in Saint-Étienne. In a physical match which saw three players sin-binned, the Australians came out victorious with a 34–14 scoreline, despite a valiant Portuguese effort. Five tries were scored by Australia, two not converted, to secure a bonus-point win and keep their faint hopes of progression to the knockout stage alive while officially knocking Portugal out of the tournament.

Ahead of the final matchweek in the pool, which Australia would not play, Fiji needed just a point from their match against Portugal to advance to the knockout stage alongside Wales and ahead of Australia. On 7 October, Wales played their final match of the pool against Georgia in which they came out with a 43–19 victory, courtesy of a hat-trick from Louis Rees-Zammit, to officially secure the Welsh top spot in Pool C. All that was left in Pool C was the final match the following day between Fiji and Portugal, to officially decide whether it would be Australia or Fiji who would finish second in the pool and join Wales in the knockout stage. With the exception of a few moments, Fiji started the game slowly and by halftime the scoreline was level at 3–3, with both teams having scored only a penalty each. By the 51st minute, Portugal looked to pull off a historic upset with Francisco Fernandes scoring a try, which converted, brought the scoreline to 10–17. In the 68th minute, a well-worked drive from Mesake Doge levelled the score at 17–17. Two converted penalties for Fiji within the space of four minutes looked to seal their place in the last-eight for them, however, in the final minute of the game, Rodrigo Marta ran in a last try. Samuel Marques would convert, bringing the final scoreline to 23–24, and marking Portugal's first ever victory in a World Cup tournament. Although Fiji lost the match, they were awarded a losing bonus-point as they lost the game within a margin of seven points, therefore putting them level with Australia on points in the standings. According to the tiebreaking criteria, advancement therefore went to the team with the better head-to-head record. Because Fiji had won against Australia, they went through to the knockout stage, and for the first time in their history, Australia was eliminated in the pool stages. Portugal finished in fourth, while Georgia took fifth.

== Standings ==
Pos	Team	Pld	W	D	L	PF	PA	PD	TF	TA	B	Pts	Qualification
1	Wales	4	4	0	0	143	59	+84	17	8	3	19	Advance to knockout stage, and qualification to the 2027 Men's Rugby World Cup
2	Fiji	4	2	0	2	88	83	+5	9	9	3	11 (Note: Head-to-head: Australia 15–22 Fiji)	Advance to knockout stage, and qualification to the 2027 Men's Rugby World Cup
3	Australia	4	2	0	2	90	91	−1	11	8	3	11	Qualification to the 2027 Men's Rugby World Cup
4	Portugal	4	1	1	2	64	103	−39	8	13	0	6	
5	Georgia	4	0	1	3	64	113	−49	7	14	1	3	

Source: World Rugby
Rules for classification: Pool stage tiebreakers

== Matches ==
=== Australia vs Georgia ===
9 September 2023
18:00 CEST (UTC+2)

(1 BP) Australia	35–15	Georgia
Try: Petaia 2' m Nawaqanitawase 9' c Donaldson (2) 56' c, 69' c Con: Donaldson (3/4) 7', 57', 70'; Pen: Donaldson (3/3) 14', 21', 31'	Report	Try: Ivanishvili 47' m Gigashvili 80' c Con: Abzhandadze (1/1) 80'; Pen: Matkava (1/1) 6'

Stade de France, Saint-Denis
Attendance: 75,770
Referee: Luke Pearce (England)

Australia	Georgia

FB	15	Ben Donaldson
RW	14	Mark Nawaqanitawase
OC	13	Jordan Petaia	(substituted off) 57'
IC	12	Samu Kerevi	(substituted off) 40'
LW	11	Marika Koroibete
FH	10	Carter Gordon
SH	9	Tate McDermott	(substituted off) 35'
N8	8	Rob Valetini
OF	7	Fraser McReight
BF	6	Tom Hooper
RL	5	Will Skelton (c)	(substituted off) 69'
LL	4	Richie Arnold	(substituted off) 62'
TP	3	Taniela Tupou	(substituted off) 70'
HK	2	Dave Porecki	(substituted off) 59'
LP	1	Angus Bell	(substituted off) 50'
Replacements:
HK	16	Matt Faessler	(substituted on) 59'
PR	17	Blake Schoupp	(substituted on) 50'
PR	18	Zane Nonggorr	(substituted on) 70'
FL	19	Rob Leota	(substituted on) 62'
FL	20	Langi Gleeson	(substituted on) 69'
SH	21	Nic White	(substituted on) 35'
CE	22	Lalakai Foketi	(substituted on) 40'
WG	23	Suliasi Vunivalu	(substituted on) 57'
Coach:
(Australia) Eddie Jones

FB	15	Davit Niniashvili		(substituted off) 62'
RW	14	Aka Tabutsadze
OC	13	Demur Tapladze
IC	12	Merab Sharikadze (c)
LW	11	Mirian Modebadze	(yellow card) 42'
FH	10	Luka Matkava		(substituted off) 69'
SH	9	Vasil Lobzhanidze		(substituted off) 52'
N8	8	Beka Gorgadze
OF	7	Luka Ivanishvili
BF	6	Tornike Jalaghonia		(substituted off) 68'
RL	5	Konstantin Mikautadze		(substituted off) 59'
LL	4	Nodar Cheishvili
TP	3	Guram Papidze		(substituted off) 40'
HK	2	Shalva Mamukashvili		(substituted off) 63'
LP	1	Nika Abuladze		(substituted off) 52'
Replacements:
HK	16	Tengiz Zamtaradze		(substituted on) 63'
PR	17	Guram Gogichashvili		(substituted on) 52'
PR	18	Beka Gigashvili		(substituted on) 40'
LK	19	Lasha Jaiani		(substituted on) 59'
FL	20	Giorgi Tsutskiridze		(substituted on) 68'
SH	21	Gela Aprasidze		(substituted on) 52'
FH	22	Tedo Abzhandadze		(substituted on) 69'
CE	23	Giorgi Kveseladze		(substituted on) 62'
Coach:
(Georgia (country)) Levan Maisashvili

Player of the Match:
Ben Donaldson (Australia)

Assistant referees:
James Doleman (New Zealand)
Craig Evans (Wales)
Television match official:
Brian MacNeice (Ireland)

Notes:

- Taniela Tupou (Australia) earned his 50th test cap.

=== Wales vs Fiji ===
10 September 2023
21:00 CEST (UTC+2)

(1 BP) Wales	32–26	Fiji (2 BP)
Try: Adams 7' m North 29' c Rees-Zammit 48' c Dee 66' c Con: Biggar (3/4) 30', 49', 67'; Pen: Biggar (2/3) 3', 24'	Report	Try: Nayacalevu 14' c Tagitagivalu 17' c Tuisova 73' c Doge 78' m Con: Lomani (2/2) 15', 18'; Tela (1/2) 73'

Nouveau Stade de Bordeaux, Bordeaux
Attendance: 41,274
Referee: Matthew Carley (England)

Wales	Fiji

FB	15	Liam Williams
RW	14	Louis Rees-Zammit
OC	13	George North
IC	12	Nick Tompkins
LW	11	Josh Adams		(substituted off) 59'
FH	10	Dan Biggar		(substituted off) 67'
SH	9	Gareth Davies		(substituted off) 38'	(substituted on) 41'	(substituted off) 52'
N8	8	Taulupe Faletau		(substituted off) 59'
OF	7	Jac Morgan (c)
BF	6	Aaron Wainwright			(substituted off) 70'
RL	5	Adam Beard		(substituted off) 59'
LL	4	Will Rowlands
TP	3	Tomas Francis		(substituted off) 63'
HK	2	Ryan Elias		(substituted off) 52'
LP	1	Gareth Thomas		(substituted off) 63'	(substituted on) 70'
Replacements:
HK	16	Elliot Dee		(substituted on) 52'
PR	17	Corey Domachowski	(yellow card) 68'	(substituted on) 63'
PR	18	Dillon Lewis		(substituted on) 63'
LK	19	Dafydd Jenkins		(substituted on) 59'
FL	20	Tommy Reffell		(substituted on) 59'
SH	21	Tomos Williams		(substituted on) 38'	(substituted off) 41'	(substituted on) 52'
FH	22	Sam Costelow		(substituted on) 67'
WG	23	Rio Dyer		(substituted on) 59'
Coach:
(New Zealand) Warren Gatland

FB	15	Ilaisa Droasese		(substituted off) 75'
RW	14	Selestino Ravutaumada
OC	13	Waisea Nayacalevu (c)
IC	12	Semi Radradra
LW	11	Vinaya Habosi		(substituted off) 52'
FH	10	Teti Tela
SH	9	Frank Lomani		(substituted off) 52'
N8	8	Viliame Mata
OF	7	Lekima Tagitagivalu	(yellow card) 65'
BF	6	Albert Tuisue		(substituted off) 59'
RL	5	Te Ahiwaru Cirikidaveta		(substituted off) 70'
LL	4	Isoa Nasilasila
TP	3	Luke Tagi		(substituted off) 67'
HK	2	Sam Matavesi		(substituted off) 67'
LP	1	Eroni Mawi		(substituted off) 57'
Replacements:
HK	16	Tevita Ikanivere		(substituted on) 67'
PR	17	Peni Ravai		(substituted on) 57'
PR	18	Mesake Doge		(substituted on) 67'
LK	19	Temo Mayanavanua		(substituted on) 70'
FL	20	Levani Botia		(substituted on) 59'
SH	21	Simione Kuruvoli		(substituted on) 52'
CE	22	Josua Tuisova		(substituted on) 52'
CE	23	Sireli Maqala		(substituted on) 75'
Coach:
(Fiji) Simon Raiwalui

Player of the Match:
Dan Biggar (Wales)

Assistant referees:
Wayne Barnes (England)
Christophe Ridley (England)
Television match official:
Brian MacNeice (Ireland)

=== Wales vs Portugal ===
16 September 2023
17:45 CEST (UTC+2)

(1 BP) Wales	28–8	Portugal
Try: Rees-Zammit 9' c Lake 40+3' c Morgan 56' c Faletau 80+3' c Con: Halfpenny (3/3) 10', 40+4', 57'; Costelow (1/1) 80+4'	Report	Try: Martins 63' m Pen: Marques (1/3) 37'

Allianz Riviera, Nice
Attendance: 28,700
Referee: Karl Dickson (England)

Wales	Portugal

FB	15	Leigh Halfpenny		(substituted off) 70'
RW	14	Louis Rees-Zammit
OC	13	Mason Grady
IC	12	Johnny Williams	(yellow card) 26'
LW	11	Rio Dyer
FH	10	Gareth Anscombe		(substituted off) 65'
SH	9	Tomos Williams		(substituted off) 65'
N8	8	Taulupe Faletau
OF	7	Jac Morgan
BF	6	Dan Lydiate		(substituted off) 54'
RL	5	Dafydd Jenkins		(substituted off) 51'
LL	4	Christ Tshiunza
TP	3	Dillon Lewis		(substituted off) 51'
HK	2	Dewi Lake (c)		(substituted off) 51'
LP	1	Nicky Smith		(substituted off) 51'
Replacements:
HK	16	Ryan Elias		(substituted on) 51'
PR	17	Corey Domachowski		(substituted on) 51'
PR	18	Tomas Francis		(substituted on) 51'
LK	19	Adam Beard		(substituted on) 51'
FL	20	Taine Basham		(substituted on) 54'
SH	21	Gareth Davies		(substituted on) 65'
FH	22	Sam Costelow		(substituted on) 65'
WG	23	Josh Adams		(substituted on) 70'
Coach:
(New Zealand) Warren Gatland

FB	15	Nuno Sousa Guedes		(substituted off) 70'
RW	14	Vincent Pinto	(red card) 77'
OC	13	José Lima		(substituted off) 57'
IC	12	Tomás Appleton (c)
LW	11	Rodrigo Marta
FH	10	Jerónimo Portela
SH	9	Samuel Marques		(substituted off) 74'
N8	8	Rafael Simões
OF	7	Nicolas Martins
BF	6	João Granate		(substituted off) 66'
RL	5	Steevy Cerqueira
LL	4	Martim Belo		(substituted off) 57'
TP	3	Anthony Alves		(substituted off) 55'
HK	2	Mike Tadjer		(substituted off) 78'
LP	1	Francisco Fernandes		(substituted off) 59'
Replacements:
HK	16	Lionel Campergue		(substituted on) 78'
PR	17	David Costa		(substituted on) 59'
PR	18	Diogo Hasse Ferreira		(substituted on) 55'
LK	19	Thibault de Freitas		(substituted on) 57'
FL	20	David Wallis		(substituted on) 66'
SH	21	Pedro Lucas		(substituted on) 74'
FH	22	Joris Moura		(substituted on) 70'
WG	23	Raffaele Storti		(substituted on) 57'
Coach:
(France) Patrice Lagisquet

Player of the Match:
Jac Morgan (Wales)

Assistant referees:
Luke Pearce (England)
Andrea Piardi (Italy)
Television match official:
Marius Jonker (South Africa)

Notes:

- This was the first ever meeting between these two nations at a World Cup. However, they did previously meet in a World Cup qualifying competition.
- Tomos Williams (Wales) earned his 50th test cap.
- Tommy Reffell (Wales) was originally named in the starting line-up, but withdrew during the match-day warm-up because of injury. He was replaced by Jac Morgan.
- José Madeira (Portugal) was originally named in the starting line-up, but withdrew the day before the match because of injury. He was replaced by Martim Belo, whose place on the bench was taken by Thibault de Freitas.

=== Australia vs Fiji ===
17 September 2023
17:45 CEST (UTC+2)

(1 BP) Australia	15–22	Fiji
Try: Nawaqanitawase 23' m Vunivalu 68' c Con: Donaldson (1/2) 70'; Pen: Donaldson (1/1) 3'	Report	Try: Tuisova 43' c Con: Kuruvoli (1/1) 44'; Pen: Kuruvoli (4/4) 12', 21', 27', 33'; Lomani (1/3) 66'

Stade Geoffroy-Guichard, Saint-Étienne
Attendance: 41,294
Referee: Andrew Brace (Ireland)

Australia	Fiji

FB	15	Ben Donaldson
RW	14	Mark Nawaqanitawase
OC	13	Jordan Petaia
IC	12	Samu Kerevi	(substituted off) 66'
LW	11	Marika Koroibete
FH	10	Carter Gordon	(substituted off) 50'
SH	9	Nic White	(substituted off) 57'
N8	8	Rob Valetini
BF	7	Fraser McReight	(substituted off) 59'
OF	6	Tom Hooper
RL	5	Richie Arnold	(substituted off) 65'
LL	4	Nick Frost
TP	3	James Slipper	(substituted off) 57'
HK	2	Dave Porecki (c)	(substituted off) 59'	(substituted on) 65'
LP	1	Angus Bell	(substituted off) 79'
Replacements:
HK	16	Jordan Uelese	(substituted on) 59'	(substituted off) 65'
PR	17	Blake Schoupp	(substituted on) 79'
PR	18	Zane Nonggorr	(substituted on) 57'
LK	19	Matt Philip	(substituted on) 65'
FL	20	Rob Leota	(substituted on) 59'
SH	21	Issak Fines-Leleiwasa	(substituted on) 57'
CE	22	Lalakai Foketi	(substituted on) 66'
WG	23	Suliasi Vunivalu	(substituted on) 50'
Coach:
(Australia) Eddie Jones

FB	15	Ilaisa Droasese
RW	14	Jiuta Wainiqolo	(substituted off) 42'
OC	13	Waisea Nayacalevu (c)
IC	12	Josua Tuisova	(substituted off) 68'
LW	11	Semi Radradra
FH	10	Teti Tela
SH	9	Simione Kuruvoli	(substituted off) 47'
N8	8	Viliame Mata
OF	7	Levani Botia	(substituted off) 59'
BF	6	Lekima Tagitagivalu
RL	5	Te Ahiwaru Cirikidaveta
LL	4	Isoa Nasilasila	(substituted off) 66'
TP	3	Luke Tagi	(substituted off) 51'	(substituted on) 59'
HK	2	Sam Matavesi	(substituted off) 51'
LP	1	Eroni Mawi	(substituted off) 51'
Replacements:
HK	16	Tevita Ikanivere	(substituted on) 51'
PR	17	Peni Ravai	(substituted on) 51'
PR	18	Mesake Doge	(substituted on) 51'	(substituted off) 59'
LK	19	Temo Mayanavanua	(substituted on) 66'
FL	20	Albert Tuisue	(substituted on) 59'
SH	21	Frank Lomani	(substituted on) 47'
CE	22	Vilimoni Botitu	(substituted on) 68'
WG	23	Vinaya Habosi	(substituted on) 42'
Coach:
(Fiji) Simon Raiwalui

Player of the Match:
Josua Tuisova (Fiji)

Assistant referees:
Jaco Peyper (South Africa)
Chris Busby (Ireland)
Television match official:
Brian MacNeice (Ireland)

Notes:

- Captain Will Skelton was originally named at lock for Australia, but failed a fitness test prior to the match. He was replaced in the starting line-up by Richie Arnold, whose place on the bench was taken by Matt Philip. The Wallabies captaincy was handed over to Dave Porecki.
- This was Fiji's first victory over Australia at the Rugby World Cup, and their first since an 18–16 away win in 1954.
- This was Fiji's largest victory over Australia.

=== Georgia vs Portugal ===
23 September 2023
14:00 CEST (UTC+2)

Georgia	18–18	Portugal
Try: Tabutsadze 2' c Zamtaradze 78' m Con: Abzhandadze (1/1) 3'; Pen: Abzhandadze (2/2) 16', 32'	Report	Try: Storti (2) 34' m, 57' c Con: Marques (1/2) 58'; Pen: Marques (2/2) 48', 53'

Stadium de Toulouse, Toulouse
Attendance: 31,889
Referee: Paul Williams (New Zealand)

Georgia	Portugal

FB	15	Davit Niniashvili
RW	14	Aka Tabutsadze
OC	13	Giorgi Kveseladze
IC	12	Merab Sharikadze (c)
LW	11	Alexander Todua	(substituted off) 67'
FH	10	Tedo Abzhandadze	(substituted off) 53'
SH	9	Gela Aprasidze	(substituted off) 59'
N8	8	Beka Gorgadze
OF	7	Beka Saghinadze	(substituted off) 70'
BF	6	Tornike Jalaghonia
RL	5	Konstantin Mikautadze	(substituted off) 55'
LL	4	Lado Chachanidze
TP	3	Beka Gigashvili	(substituted off) 59'
HK	2	Shalva Mamukashvili	(substituted off) 55'
LP	1	Mikheil Nariashvili	(substituted off) 51'
Replacements:
HK	16	Tengiz Zamtaradze	(substituted on) 55'
PR	17	Guram Gogichashvili	(substituted on) 51'
PR	18	Guram Papidze	(substituted on) 59'
LK	19	Nodar Cheishvili	(substituted on) 55'
FL	20	Giorgi Tsutskiridze	(substituted on) 70'
SH	21	Vasil Lobzhanidze	(substituted on) 59'
FH	22	Luka Matkava	(substituted on) 53'
WG	23	Demur Tapladze	(substituted on) 67'
Coach:
(Georgia (country)) Levan Maisashvili

FB	15	Nuno Sousa Guedes
RW	14	Raffaele Storti
OC	13	Pedro Bettencourt
IC	12	Tomás Appleton (c)
LW	11	Rodrigo Marta
FH	10	Jerónimo Portela
SH	9	Samuel Marques		(substituted off) 72'
N8	8	Rafael Simões		(substituted off) 59'
OF	7	Nicolas Martins
BF	6	João Granate		(substituted off) 42'	(substituted on) 45'	(substituted off) 59'
RL	5	Steevy Cerqueira		(substituted off) 66'
LL	4	José Madeira
TP	3	Diogo Hasse Ferreira					(substituted off) 80'
HK	2	Mike Tadjer		(substituted off) 69'
LP	1	Francisco Fernandes	(yellow card) 37'			(substituted off) 55'	(substituted on) 80'
Replacements:
PR	16	David Costa		(substituted on) 42'	(substituted off) 45'	(substituted on) 55'
HK	17	Lionel Campergue		(substituted on) 69'
PR	18	Anthony Alves
LK	19	Martim Belo		(substituted on) 66'
FL	20	David Wallis		(substituted on) 59'
FL	21	Thibault de Freitas				(substituted on) 59'
SH	22	Pedro Lucas		(substituted on) 72'
WG	23	Manuel Cardoso Pinto
Coach:
(France) Patrice Lagisquet

Player of the Match:
Jerónimo Portela (Portugal)

Assistant referees:
Matthew Carley (England)
Chris Busby (Ireland)
Television match official:
Joy Neville (Ireland)

Notes:

- This was the first ever meeting between these two nations at a World Cup.
- This was the fourth draw in a World Cup match, and the first since Canada and Japan drew 23–23 in 2011.

=== Wales vs Australia ===
24 September 2023
21:00 CEST (UTC+2)

Wales	40–6	Australia
Try: Davies 3' c Tompkins 48' c Morgan 78' m Con: Biggar (1/1) 4'; Anscombe (1/2) 49'; Pen: Anscombe (6/7) 21', 29', 39', 43', 52', 60'; Drop: Anscombe (1/1) 70'	Report	Pen: Donaldson (2/2) 9', 14'

Parc Olympique Lyonnais, Décines-Charpieu
Attendance: 55,296
Referee: Wayne Barnes (England)

Wales	Australia

FB	15	Liam Williams
RW	14	Louis Rees-Zammit	(substituted off) 71'
OC	13	George North
IC	12	Nick Tompkins
LW	11	Josh Adams
FH	10	Dan Biggar	(substituted off) 12'
SH	9	Gareth Davies	(substituted off) 60'
N8	8	Taulupe Faletau
OF	7	Jac Morgan (c)
BF	6	Aaron Wainwright	(substituted off) 71'
RL	5	Adam Beard
LL	4	Will Rowlands	(substituted off) 71'
TP	3	Tomas Francis	(substituted off) 67'
HK	2	Ryan Elias	(substituted off) 67'
LP	1	Gareth Thomas	(substituted off) 67'
Replacements:
HK	16	Elliot Dee	(substituted on) 67'
PR	17	Corey Domachowski	(substituted on) 67'
PR	18	Henry Thomas	(substituted on) 67'
LK	19	Dafydd Jenkins	(substituted on) 71'
FL	20	Taine Basham	(substituted on) 71'
SH	21	Tomos Williams	(substituted on) 60'
FH	22	Gareth Anscombe	(substituted on) 12'
WG	23	Rio Dyer	(substituted on) 71'
Coach:
(New Zealand) Warren Gatland

FB	15	Andrew Kellaway	(substituted off) 60'
RW	14	Mark Nawaqanitawase
OC	13	Jordan Petaia
IC	12	Samu Kerevi
LW	11	Marika Koroibete
FH	10	Ben Donaldson	(substituted off) 53'
SH	9	Tate McDermott	(substituted off) 68'
N8	8	Rob Valetini
OF	7	Tom Hooper
BF	6	Rob Leota	(substituted off) 50'
RL	5	Richie Arnold	(substituted off) 66'
LL	4	Nick Frost
TP	3	James Slipper	(substituted off) 41'
HK	2	Dave Porecki (c)	(substituted off) 60'
LP	1	Angus Bell	(substituted off) 68'
Replacements:
HK	16	Matt Faessler	(substituted on) 60'
PR	17	Blake Schoupp	(substituted on) 68'
PR	18	Pone Fa'amausili	(substituted on) 41'
LK	19	Matt Philip	(substituted on) 66'
FL	20	Fraser McReight	(substituted on) 50'
SH	21	Nic White	(substituted on) 68'
FH	22	Carter Gordon	(substituted on) 53'
WG	23	Suliasi Vunivalu	(substituted on) 60'
Coach:
(Australia) Eddie Jones

Player of the Match:
Gareth Anscombe (Wales)

Assistant referees:
Luke Pearce (England)
Christophe Ridley (England)
Television match official:
Tom Foley (England)

Notes:

- This was Wales' largest ever victory over Australia, for both total points scored and overall winning margin.
- This was Australia's largest defeat in a World Cup match (by margin). It was also the first time they had lost two matches in the World Cup pool stages.
- Adam Beard (Wales) earned his 50th test cap.
- With this loss, Australia dropped to 10th place in the World Rugby Rankings – their lowest placement in history.

=== Fiji vs Georgia ===
30 September 2023
17:45 CEST (UTC+2)

Fiji	17–12	Georgia (1 BP)
Try: Nayacalevu 51' c Habosi 68' c Con: Lomani (2/2) 52', 69'; Pen: Lomani (1/2) 65'	Report	Pen: Matkava (2/2) 5', 80'; Niniashvili (2/2) 19', 31'

Nouveau Stade de Bordeaux, Bordeaux
Attendance: 39,862
Referee: Karl Dickson (England)

Fiji	Georgia

FB	15	Ilaisa Droasese
RW	14	Selestino Ravutaumada
OC	13	Waisea Nayacalevu (c)
IC	12	Josua Tuisova	(yellow card) 80'
LW	11	Semi Radradra	(yellow card) 41'	(substituted off) 60'
FH	10	Teti Tela
SH	9	Simione Kuruvoli		(substituted off) 48'
N8	8	Viliame Mata		(substituted off) 60'
OF	7	Levani Botia
BF	6	Lekima Tagitagivalu
RL	5	Te Ahiwaru Cirikidaveta		(substituted off) 65'
LL	4	Isoa Nasilasila
TP	3	Luke Tagi		(substituted off) 70'
HK	2	Sam Matavesi		(substituted off) 60'
LP	1	Eroni Mawi		(substituted off) 48'
Replacements:
HK	16	Tevita Ikanivere		(substituted on) 60'
PR	17	Peni Ravai		(substituted on) 48'
PR	18	Samu Tawake		(substituted on) 70'
LK	19	Temo Mayanavanua		(substituted on) 65'
N8	20	Albert Tuisue		(substituted on) 60'
SH	21	Frank Lomani		(substituted on) 48'
CE	22	Vilimoni Botitu
WG	23	Vinaya Habosi		(substituted on) 60'
Coach:
(Fiji) Simon Raiwalui

FB	15	Mirian Modebadze
RW	14	Aka Tabutsadze
OC	13	Demur Tapladze
IC	12	Giorgi Kveseladze
LW	11	Davit Niniashvili	(substituted off) 78'
FH	10	Luka Matkava
SH	9	Vasil Lobzhanidze	(substituted off) 59'
N8	8	Tornike Jalaghonia
OF	7	Beka Saghinadze		(substituted off) 66'
BF	6	Mikheil Gachechiladze
RL	5	Konstantin Mikautadze	(substituted off) 61'	(substituted on) 66'
LL	4	Lasha Jaiani	(substituted off) 17'
TP	3	Beka Gigashvili	(substituted off) 59'
HK	2	Tengiz Zamtaradze	(substituted off) 12'
LP	1	Mikheil Nariashvili (c)	(substituted off) 44'
Replacements:
HK	16	Luka Nioradze	(substituted on) 12'
PR	17	Nika Abuladze	(substituted on) 44'
PR	18	Irakli Aptsiauri	(substituted on) 59'
LK	19	Nodar Cheishvili	(substituted on) 17'
FL	20	Luka Ivanishvili	(substituted on) 61'	(substituted off) 71'
SH	21	Gela Aprasidze	(substituted on) 59'
FH	22	Tedo Abzhandadze	(substituted on) 78'
CE	23	Tornike Kakhoidze		(substituted on) 71'
Coach:
(Georgia (country)) Levan Maisashvili

Player of the Match:
Levani Botia (Fiji)

Assistant referees:
Jaco Peyper (South Africa)
Pierre Brousset (France)
Television match official:
Tom Foley (England)

Notes:

- Irakli Aptsiauri (Georgia) made his international debut.

=== Australia vs Portugal ===
1 October 2023
17:45 CEST (UTC+2)

(1 BP) Australia	34–14	Portugal
Try: Arnold 19' c Porecki 22' c Bell 26' c McReight 47' m Koroibete 74' m Con: Donaldson (3/5) 20', 24', 27'; Pen: Donaldson (1/2) 4'	Report	Try: Bettencourt 13' c Simões 70' c Con: Marques (2/2) 14', 71'

Stade Geoffroy-Guichard, Saint-Étienne
Attendance: 41,342
Referee: Nika Amashukeli (Georgia)

Australia	Portugal

FB	15	Andrew Kellaway		(substituted off) 71'
RW	14	Mark Nawaqanitawase
OC	13	Izaia Perese		(substituted off) 56'
IC	12	Lalakai Foketi
LW	11	Marika Koroibete
FH	10	Ben Donaldson
SH	9	Tate McDermott		(substituted off) 71'
N8	8	Rob Valetini		(substituted off) 23'	(substituted on) 33'
OF	7	Fraser McReight			(substituted off) 60'	(substituted on) 71'
BF	6	Tom Hooper
RL	5	Richie Arnold		(substituted off) 78'
LL	4	Nick Frost				(substituted off) 41'
TP	3	James Slipper		(substituted off) 47'	(substituted on) 76'
HK	2	Dave Porecki (c)		(substituted off) 56'	(substituted on) 60'	(substituted off) 71'
LP	1	Angus Bell		(substituted off) 76'
Replacements:
HK	16	Matt Faessler	(yellow card) 60'	(substituted on) 56'
PR	17	Blake Schoupp		(substituted on) 76'
PR	18	Pone Fa'amausili		(substituted on) 47'	(substituted off) 76'
FL	19	Rob Leota		(substituted on) 23'	(substituted off) 33'	(substituted on) 41'
FL	20	Josh Kemeny		(substituted on) 78'
SH	21	Issak Fines-Leleiwasa		(substituted on) 71'
CE	22	Samu Kerevi	(yellow card) 62'	(substituted on) 56'
WG	23	Suliasi Vunivalu		(substituted on) 71'
Coach:
(Australia) Eddie Jones

FB	15	Nuno Sousa Guedes
RW	14	Raffaele Storti		(substituted off) 56'
OC	13	Pedro Bettencourt	(yellow card) 15'
IC	12	Tomás Appleton (c)
LW	11	Rodrigo Marta
FH	10	Jerónimo Portela		(substituted off) 76'
SH	9	Samuel Marques		(substituted off) 71'
N8	8	Thibault de Freitas		(substituted off) 41'
OF	7	Nicolas Martins
BF	6	David Wallis
RL	5	Martim Belo		(substituted off) 50'
LL	4	José Madeira
TP	3	Diogo Hasse Ferreira		(substituted off) 71'
HK	2	Mike Tadjer		(substituted off) 71'
LP	1	David Costa		(substituted off) 55'
Replacements:
PR	16	Francisco Fernandes		(substituted on) 55'
HK	17	Duarte Diniz		(substituted on) 71'
PR	18	Francisco Bruno		(substituted on) 71'
LK	19	Steevy Cerqueira		(substituted on) 50'
FL	20	Rafael Simões		(substituted on) 41'
SH	21	João Bello		(substituted on) 71'
FH	22	Joris Moura		(substituted on) 76'
WG	23	Manuel Cardoso Pinto		(substituted on) 56'
Coach:
(France) Patrice Lagisquet

Player of the Match:
Rob Valetini (Australia)

Assistant referees:
Mathieu Raynal (France)
Andrea Piardi (Italy)
Television match official:
Joy Neville (Ireland)

Notes:

- This was the first ever meeting between these two nations at a World Cup.
- Carter Gordon was originally named on the bench for Australia, but withdrew prior to the match because of injury. He was replaced by Samu Kerevi.

=== Wales vs Georgia ===
7 October 2023
15:00 CEST (UTC+2)

(1 BP) Wales	43–19	Georgia
Try: Francis 16' c L. Williams 23' c Rees-Zammit (3) 43' c, 67' c, 74' m North 80' c Con: Costelow (5/6) 17', 24', 44', 69', 80+1'; Pen: Costelow (1/2) 27'	Report	Try: Sharikadze 35' c Karkadze 59' c Niniashvili 62' m Con: Matkava (2/3) 36', 60'

Stade de la Beaujoire, Nantes
Attendance: 33,580
Referee: Mathieu Raynal (France)

Wales	Georgia

FB	15	Liam Williams		(substituted off) 69'
RW	14	Louis Rees-Zammit
OC	13	George North
IC	12	Nick Tompkins
LW	11	Rio Dyer
FH	10	Sam Costelow
SH	9	Tomos Williams		(substituted off) 60'
N8	8	Taulupe Faletau		(substituted off) 69'
OF	7	Tommy Reffell
BF	6	Aaron Wainwright		(substituted off) 69'
RL	5	Dafydd Jenkins
LL	4	Will Rowlands
TP	3	Tomas Francis		(substituted off) 52'
HK	2	Dewi Lake (c)		(substituted off) 52'
LP	1	Gareth Thomas		(substituted off) 52'
Replacements:
HK	16	Elliot Dee		(substituted on) 52'
PR	17	Nicky Smith		(substituted on) 52'
PR	18	Henry Thomas		(substituted on) 52'
LK	19	Christ Tshiunza		(substituted on) 69'
FL	20	Taine Basham	(yellow card) 71'	(substituted on) 69'
SH	21	Gareth Davies		(substituted on) 60'
FH	22	Dan Biggar
CE	23	Mason Grady		(substituted on) 69'
Coach:
(New Zealand) Warren Gatland

FB	15	Lasha Khmaladze		(substituted off) 41'
RW	14	Aka Tabutsadze
OC	13	Giorgi Kveseladze
IC	12	Merab Sharikadze (c)
LW	11	Davit Niniashvili	(yellow card) 71'
FH	10	Luka Matkava		(substituted off) 69'
SH	9	Vasil Lobzhanidze		(substituted off) 58'
N8	8	Tornike Jalaghonia
OF	7	Beka Saghinadze
BF	6	Mikheil Gachechiladze		(substituted off) 69'
RL	5	Konstantin Mikautadze		(substituted off) 49'
LL	4	Nodar Cheishvili
TP	3	Beka Gigashvili		(substituted off) 50'
HK	2	Shalva Mamukashvili		(substituted off) 41'
LP	1	Guram Gogichashvili		(substituted off) 41'
Replacements:
HK	16	Vano Karkadze		(substituted on) 41'
PR	17	Nika Abuladze		(substituted on) 41'
PR	18	Irakli Aptsiauri		(substituted on) 50'
LK	19	Lado Chachanidze		(substituted on) 49'
FL	20	Giorgi Tsutskiridze		(substituted on) 69'
SH	21	Gela Aprasidze		(substituted on) 58'
FH	22	Tedo Abzhandadze		(substituted on) 69'
CE	23	Demur Tapladze		(substituted on) 41'
Coach:
(Georgia (country)) Levan Maisashvili

Player of the Match:
Tommy Reffell (Wales)

Assistant referees:
Ben O'Keeffe (New Zealand)
Pierre Brousset (France)
Television match official:
Brendon Pickerill (New Zealand)

Notes:

- Gareth Anscombe was originally named to start at fly-half for Wales, but withdrew after sustaining a groin injury during the pre-match warm-up. He was replaced by Sam Costelow, whose place on the bench was taken by Dan Biggar.
- Wales finished top of their pool for the second World Cup in a row – the first time they have achieved this feat in consecutive tournaments.

=== Fiji vs Portugal ===
8 October 2023
21:00 CEST (UTC+2)

(1 BP) Fiji	23–24	Portugal
Try: Botia 48' c Doge 68' c Con: Lomani (2/2) 49', 69'; Pen: Lomani (3/3) 10', 74', 76'	Report	Try: Storti 45' c Fernandes 51' c Marta 78' c Con: Marques (3/3) 47', 53', 79'; Pen: Marques (1/1) 38'

Stadium de Toulouse, Toulouse
Attendance: 32,223
Referee: Luke Pearce (England)

Fiji	Portugal

FB	15	Sireli Maqala
RW	14	Selestino Ravutaumada		(substituted off) 77'
OC	13	Waisea Nayacalevu (c)		(substituted off) 62'
IC	12	Josua Tuisova		(substituted off) 72'
LW	11	Vinaya Habosi
FH	10	Vilimoni Botitu
SH	9	Frank Lomani
N8	8	Viliame Mata		(substituted off) 72'	(substituted on) 80'
OF	7	Levani Botia	(yellow card) 50'
BF	6	Meli Derenalagi
RL	5	Temo Mayanavanua		(substituted off) 17'
LL	4	Isoa Nasilasila
TP	3	Luke Tagi		(substituted off) 61'
HK	2	Sam Matavesi		(substituted off) 61'
LP	1	Eroni Mawi		(substituted off) 61'
Replacements:
HK	16	Tevita Ikanivere		(substituted on) 61'
PR	17	Peni Ravai		(substituted on) 61'
PR	18	Mesake Doge		(substituted on) 61'
LK	19	Te Ahiwaru Cirikidaveta		(substituted on) 17'	(substituted off) 80'
FL	20	Albert Tuisue		(substituted on) 72'
SH	21	Ratu Peni Matawalu		(substituted on) 77'
FH	22	Teti Tela		(substituted on) 72'
CE	23	Iosefo Masi		(substituted on) 62'
Coach:
(Fiji) Simon Raiwalui

FB	15	Manuel Cardoso Pinto	(substituted off) 65'
RW	14	Raffaele Storti
OC	13	Pedro Bettencourt	(substituted off) 61'	(substituted on) 72'
IC	12	José Lima (c)			(substituted off) 74'
LW	11	Rodrigo Marta
FH	10	Jerónimo Portela
SH	9	Samuel Marques
N8	8	Rafael Simões
OF	7	Nicolas Martins	(substituted off) 69'
BF	6	David Wallis
RL	5	Steevy Cerqueira	(substituted off) 77'
LL	4	José Madeira
TP	3	Diogo Hasse Ferreira	(substituted off) 62'
HK	2	Mike Tadjer	(substituted off) 74'
LP	1	Francisco Fernandes	(substituted off) 57'
Replacements:
PR	16	David Costa	(substituted on) 57'
HK	17	Duarte Diniz	(substituted on) 74'
PR	18	Anthony Alves	(substituted on) 62'
LK	19	Duarte Torgal	(substituted on) 77'
FL	20	João Granate	(substituted on) 69'
SH	21	João Bello
CE	22	Tomás Appleton	(substituted on) 61'	(substituted off) 72'	(substituted on) 74'
WG	23	Vincent Pinto	(substituted on) 65'
Coach:
(France) Patrice Lagisquet

Player of the Match:
Nicolas Martins (Portugal)

Assistant referees:
Jaco Peyper (South Africa)
Pierre Brousset (France)
Television match official:
Brian MacNeice (Ireland)

Notes:

- This was the first ever meeting between these two nations at a World Cup.
- This was Portugal's first ever World Cup victory, and their first ever victory over Fiji or any other Pacific Island nation.
- Portugal achieved their highest points total (24) and most tries scored (3) in a World Cup match.
- Fiji qualified for the knockout stage of the World Cup for the first time since 2007, and just the third time in their history.
- Fiji became the first team since France in 2011 to progress to the knockout stage with only two wins in the pool stage.
- With this result, Australia were eliminated at the pool stage of the World Cup for the first time.
