= History of rugby union matches between Australia and Fiji =

Australia and Fiji have played each other twenty-four times, of which Australia has won the most with twenty, including three at the Rugby World Cup's (RWC) of 2007, 2015 and 2019. Fiji won two of the first four matches between the two teams (between 1952 and 1954), however, did not beat Australia again until 2023 (69 years and 83 days later), at the 2023 Rugby World Cup.

Their first meeting was in 1952, and Australia won 15–9. Australia is also Fiji's most-played Tier-One opponent, slightly ahead of Japan, who was given Tier-One status by World Rugby (WR) in 2020.

== Summary ==
=== Overall ===
Details	Played	Won by Australia	Won by Fiji	Drawn	Australia points	Fiji points
In Australia	17	14	2	1	490	210
In Fiji	3	3	0	0	59	31
Neutral venue	4	3	1	0	137	68
Overall	24	20	3	1	686	309

=== Records ===
Note: Date shown in brackets indicates when the record was last set.

Record	Australia	Fiji
Longest winning streak	15 (19 September 1972 – 21 September 2019)	1 (26 June 1954 – 10 June 1961) (Note: Fiji have not beaten Australia in consecutive matches. The longest period of time following a victory, however, was 6 years and 349 days between 1954 and 1961.)
Largest points for
Home	66 (18 September 1998)	19 (19 September 1972)
Away	55 (23 September 2007)	28 (10 August 1985)
Largest winning margin
Home	49 (9 June 2007)	—
Away	43 (23 September 2007)	7 (17 September 2023)

== Results ==
No.	Date	Venue	Score	Winner	Competition	Attendance	Ref.
1	26 July 1952	Sydney Cricket Ground, Sydney	15–9	Australia	1952 Fiji tour of Australia	13,457	
2	9 August 1952	Sydney Cricket Ground, Sydney	15–17	Fiji	1952 Fiji tour of Australia	42,004	
3	5 June 1954	Exhibition Ground, Brisbane	22–19	Australia	1954 Fiji tour of Australia	29,753	
4	26 June 1954	Sydney Cricket Ground, Sydney	16–18	Fiji	1954 Fiji tour of Australia	33,099	
5	10 June 1961	Exhibition Ground, Brisbane	24–6	Australia	1961 Fiji tour of Australia	7,000	
6	17 June 1961	Sydney Cricket Ground, Sydney	20–14	Australia	1961 Fiji tour of Australia	20,868	
7	1 July 1961	Olympic Park Stadium, Melbourne	3–3	draw	1961 Fiji tour of Australia	7,500	
8	19 September 1972	Buckhurst Park, Suva	19–21	Australia	1972 Australia tour of New Zealand and Fiji	13,000	
9	12 June 1976	Sydney Cricket Ground, Sydney	22–6	Australia	1976 Fiji tour of Australia	14,299	
10	19 June 1976	Ballymore Stadium, Brisbane	21–9	Australia	1976 Fiji tour of Australia	10,000	
11	26 June 1976	Sydney Cricket Ground, Sydney	27–17	Australia	1976 Fiji tour of Australia	7,800	
12	24 May 1980	Buckhurst Park, Suva	9–22	Australia	1980 Australia tour of Fiji	20,000	
13	9 June 1984	Buckhurst Park, Suva	3–16	Australia	1984 Australia tour of Fiji	20,000	
14	10 August 1985	Ballymore Stadium, Brisbane	52–28	Australia	1985 Fiji tour of Australia	10,000	
15	17 August 1985	Sydney Cricket Ground, Sydney	31–9	Australia	1985 Fiji tour of Australia	12,987	
16	18 September 1998	Parramatta Stadium, Sydney	66–20	Australia	1999 Rugby World Cup qualification	17,242	
17	9 June 2007	Subiaco Oval, Perth	49–0	Australia	2007 Tri Nations Series warm-up match	20,108	
18	23 September 2007	Stade de la Mosson, Montpellier (France)	55–12	Australia	2007 Rugby World Cup	32,321	
19	5 June 2010	Canberra Stadium, Canberra	49–3	Australia	2010 Tri Nations Series warm-up match	15,438	
20	23 September 2015	Millennium Stadium, Cardiff (Wales)	28–13	Australia	2015 Rugby World Cup	67,253	
21	10 June 2017	Melbourne Rectangular Stadium, Melbourne	37–14	Australia	2017 Summer International	13,583	
22	21 September 2019	Sapporo Dome, Sapporo (Japan)	39–21	Australia	2019 Rugby World Cup	36,482	
23	17 September 2023	Stade Geoffroy-Guichard, Saint-Étienne (France)	15–22	Fiji	2023 Rugby World Cup	41,294	
24	6 July 2025	Newcastle International Sports Centre, Newcastle	21–18	Australia	2025 Summer International	28,132	

== List of series ==
Played	Won by Australia	Won by Fiji	Drawn
8	6	0	2

Year	Australia	Fiji	Series winner
1952	1	1	drawn
1954	1	1	drawn
1961	2	0 (Note: Australia won two tests with one test being drawn; Australia were series winners 2–0.)	Australia
1972	1	0	Australia
1976	3	0	Australia
1980	1	0	Australia
1984	1	0	Australia
1985	2	0	Australia

== Statistics ==
=== Per location ===
==== In Australia ====
State/Territory	Location	Venue	Won by Australia	Won by Fiji	Drawn
New South Wales	Sydney	Sydney Cricket Ground	5	2	0
New South Wales	Sydney	Parramatta Stadium	1	0	0
New South Wales	Newcastle	McDonald Jones Stadium	1	0	0
Total			7	2	—
Queensland	Brisbane	Exhibition Ground	2	0	0
Queensland	Brisbane	Ballymore Stadium	2	0	0
Total			4	0	—
Victoria	Melbourne	Olympic Park Stadium	0	0	1
Victoria	Melbourne	Melbourne Rectangular Stadium	1	0	0
Total			1	0	1
Western Australia	Perth	Subiaco Oval	1	0	0
Total			1	0	—
Australian Capital Territory	Canberra	Canberra Stadium	1	0	0
Total			1	0	—
Overall total			14	2	1

==== In Fiji ====
Province	Location	Venue	Won by Australia	Won by Fiji	Drawn
Rewa	Suva	National Stadium	3	0	0
Total			3	0	—
Overall total			3	0	—

==== Neutral location ====
Country	Location	Venue	Won by Australia	Won by Fiji	Drawn
France	Montpellier	Stade de la Mosson	1	0	0
France	Saint-Étienne	Stade Geoffroy-Guichard	0	1	0
Total			1	1	—
Wales	Cardiff	Millennium Stadium	1	0	0
Total			1	0	—
Japan	Sapporo	Sapporo Dome	1	0	0
Total			1	0	—
Overall total			3	1	—
