= 2005 June rugby union tests =

2005 international rugby union matches

The 2005 mid-year rugby union tests (also known as the Summer Internationals in the Northern Hemisphere) refers to the Rugby union Test matches played during between May and July in 2005. It will coincide with the 2005 British & Irish Lions tour to New Zealand, playing a 3-test tour against New Zealand. Wales toured North America, playing against Canada and the United States, while Ireland played two tests against Japan.

Scotland played one test against Romania due to the Lions tour, while Italy played two tests against Argentina and a single test against Australia. France toured South Africa for two tests before playing a single test against Australia. Ahead of the Lions series, New Zealand played Fiji as a warm-up, while Australia warmed-up against Samoa ahead of the French and Italian clashes. In addition to these two tier 2 sides, Japan played Argentina and Uruaguy losing both matches before the Irish test series.

== Overview ==
=== Series ===
Tour	Result	Winners
New Zealand v British & Irish Lions test series	3–0	New Zealand
South Africa v France test series	1–0	South Africa
Japan v Ireland test series	0–2	Ireland
Argentina v Italy test series	1–1	Drawn

=== Other tours ===
Team/Tour	Opponents
Barbarians tour	Scotland (L) – England (W)
Welsh tour	United States (W) – Canada (W)
Japan tour	Uruguay (L) – Argentina (L)

== Matches ==
=== Week 1 ===
16 April 2005
16:00 UYT (UTC-3)

Uruguay	24–18	Japan
Try: Dugonjic; Castillo (3); Con: Castillo (2/2)	Report	Try: Loamanu; Ohata; Con: Morita (1/2); Pen: Morita (1); Drop: Morita (1)

Estadio Luis Franzini, Montevideo
Attendance: 5,000
Referee: Leonardo Borghi (Argentina)

=== Week 2 ===
23 April 2005
15:00 ART (UTC-03)

Argentina	68–36	Japan
Try: Albina; Ayerza; Bosch; Genoud (2); Higgs (2); Leguizamón; Penalty try Con: J. F. Miranda (2); Todeschini (5); Pen: Todeschini (3)	Report	Try: Motoki; Ohata; Onozawa; Tachikawa; Con: Morita (2/4); Pen: Morita (3); Drop: Morita (1)

Buenos Aires Cricket & Rugby Club, Buenos Aires
Attendance: 5,000
Referee: Dave Pearson (England)

=== Week 3 ===
23 May 2005
20:00 BST (UTC+01)

British & Irish Lions	25–25	Argentina
Try: Smith; Con: Wilkinson (1/1); Pen: Wilkinson (6)	Report	Try: Núñez Piossek; Con: Todeschini (1/1); Pen: Todeschini (6)

Millennium Stadium, Cardiff
Attendance: 61,569
Referee: Stuart Dickinson (Australia)

24 May 2005
15:00 BST (UTC+01)

Scotland	38–7	Barbarians
	Report

Pittodrie Stadium, Aberdeen

28 May 2005
14:30 BST (UTC+01)

England	39–52	Barbarians
	Report

Twickenham Stadium, London

=== Week 4 ===
4 June 2005
15:00 EDT (UTC-04)

United States	3–77	Wales
	Report

Rentschler Field, East Hartford, Connecticut
Attendance: 8,027
Referee: Craig Joubert (South Africa)

5 June 2005
19:00 EEST (UTC+03)

Romania	19–39	Scotland
	Report

Stadionul Dinamo, Bucharest
Attendance: 3,000
Referee: Dave Pearson (England)

=== Week 5 ===
10 June 2005
19:10 NZST (UTC+12)

New Zealand	91–0	Fiji
Try: Carter; Howlett (2); Mauger; Mealamu; Muliaina; Sivivatu (4); Somerville; So'oialo; Umaga; Williams; Con: Carter (5); Mauger (3)	Report

North Harbour Stadium, Auckland
Attendance: 23,533
Referee: Nigel Whitehouse (Wales)

11 June 2005
15:00 SAST (UTC+02)

South Africa	134–3	Uruguay
	Report

Basil Kenyon Stadium, East London
Attendance: 9,800
Referee: Donal Courtney (Ireland)

11 June 2005
15:00 AEST (UTC+10)

Australia	74–7	Samoa
	Report

Stadium Australia, Sydney
Attendance: 38,556
Referee: Lyndon Bray (New Zealand)

11 June 2005
15:00 EDT (UTC-04)

Canada	3–60	Wales
	Report

York Stadium, Toronto
Referee: Matt Goddard (Australia)

11 June 2005
18:10 ART (UTC-03)

Argentina	35–21	Italy
Try: Arbizu; Todeschini; Con: Todeschini (2/2); Pen: Todeschini (7)	Report	Pen: Peens (6); Drop: Peens

Estadio Padre Ernesto Martearena, Salta
Attendance: 20,000
Referee: Tappe Henning (South Africa)

12 June 2005
14:13 JST (UTC+9)

Japan	12–44	Ireland
	Report

Nagai Stadium, Osaka
Attendance: 12,108
Referee: Nigel Owens (Wales)

=== Week 6 ===
17 June 2005
20:10 ART (UTC-03)

Argentina	29–30	Italy
Try: Bouza; Stortoni; Con: Todeschini (2/2); Pen: Todeschini (5)	Report	Try: Canale; Parisse; Pez; Con: Peens (3/3); Pen: Peens (3)

Estadio Mario Alberto Kempes, Córdoba
Referee: Mark Lawrence (South Africa)

18 June 2005
15:00 SAST (UTC+02)

South Africa	30–30	France
Try: De Villiers; Habana (2); Con: Montgomery (3/3); Pen: Montgomery (2); Drop: Montgomery	Report	Try: Bonnaire; Candelon; Nyanga; Papé; Con: Élissalde (2/4); Pen: Élissalde (1); Drop: Michalak

Kings Park Stadium, Durban
Attendance: 50,419
Referee: Alan Lewis (Ireland)

19 June 2005
14:06 JST (UTC+9)

Japan	18–47	Ireland
	Report

Chichibunomiya Rugby Stadium, Tokyo
Attendance: 14,913
Referee: Nigel Whitehouse (Wales)

=== Week 7 ===
25 June 2005
15:00 SAST (UTC+02)

South Africa	27–13	France
Try: De Villiers; Habana (2); Con: Montgomery (3/3); Pen: Montgomery (2)	Report	Try: Michalak; Con: Michalak; Pen: Michalak; Yachvili

EPRU Stadium, Port Elizabeth
Attendance: 35,000
Referee: Donal Courtney (Ireland)

25 June 2005
15:00 AEST (UTC+10)

Australia	69–21	Italy
Try: Chisholm; Giteau; Gregan; Lyons; Paul; Sailor; Rogers; Tuqiri (4); Con: Giteau (6); Mortlock	Report	Try: Bergamasco; Lo Cicero; Mannato; Con: Peens (3/3)

Docklands Stadium, Melbourne
Attendance: 26,520
Referee: Alan Lewis (Ireland)

25 June 2005
19:00 NZST (UTC+12)

New Zealand	21–3	British & Irish Lions
Try: Sivivatu; Williams; Con: Carter (1/2); Pen: Carter (3)	Report	Pen: Wilkinson (1)

Lancaster Park, Christchurch
Attendance: 37,200
Referee: Joël Jutge (France)

=== Week 8 ===
2 July 2005
14:00 MDT (UTC-06)

Canada	22–15	Argentina
	Report

Calgary Rugby Park, Calgary
Attendance: 2,173
Referee: Rob Dickson (Scotland)

2 July 2005
AEST (UTC+10)

Australia	37–31	France
Try: Larkham; Latham; Paul; Sailor; Turinui (2); Con: Giteau; Rogers; Pen: Giteau	Report	Try: Candelon; Heymans; Laharrague; Traille; Con: Élissalde (4/4); Pen: Élissalde (1)

Lang Park, Brisbane
Attendance: 50,826
Referee: Nigel Williams (Wales)

2 July 2005
19:00 NZST (UTC+12)

New Zealand	48–18	British & Irish Lions
Try: Carter (2); McCaw; Sivivatu; Umaga; Con: Carter (4/5); Pen: Carter (5)		Try: Easterby; Thomas; Con: Wilkinson (1/2); Pen: Wilkinson (2)

Wellington Regional Stadium, Wellington
Attendance: 39,800
Referee: Andrew Cole (Australia)

=== Week 9 ===
9 July 2005
19:00 NZST (UTC+12)

New Zealand	38–19	British & Irish Lions
Try: Gear; Smith; Umaga (2); Williams; Con: McAlister (5/5); Pen: McAlister (1)		Try: Moody; Con: S. Jones (1/1); Pen: S. Jones (4)

Eden Park, Auckland
Attendance: 48,533
Referee: Jonathan Kaplan (South Africa)

9 July 2005
20:00 AEST (UTC+10)

Australia	30–12	South Africa
Try: Giteau (2); Larkham; Mitchell; Rogers; Con: Giteau; Pen: Giteau	Report	Pen: Montgomery (4)

Stadium Australia, Sydney
Attendance: 61,534
Referee: Kelvin Deaker (New Zealand)

=== Week 10 ===
23 July 2005
15:00 SAST (UTC+02)

South Africa	33–20	Australia
Try: De Villiers; Fourie; Habana; Con: Montgomery (3/3; Pen: Montgomery (4)	Report	Try: Larkham; Lyons; Paul; Con: Mortlock; Pen: Giteau

Ellis Park Stadium, Johannesburg
Attendance: 60,486
Referee: Steve Walsh (New Zealand)

== See also ==
- Mid-year rugby union test series
- 2005 end-of-year rugby union tests
- 2005 British & Irish Lions tour to New Zealand
- 2005 Churchill Cup
