= Nicolas Martins =

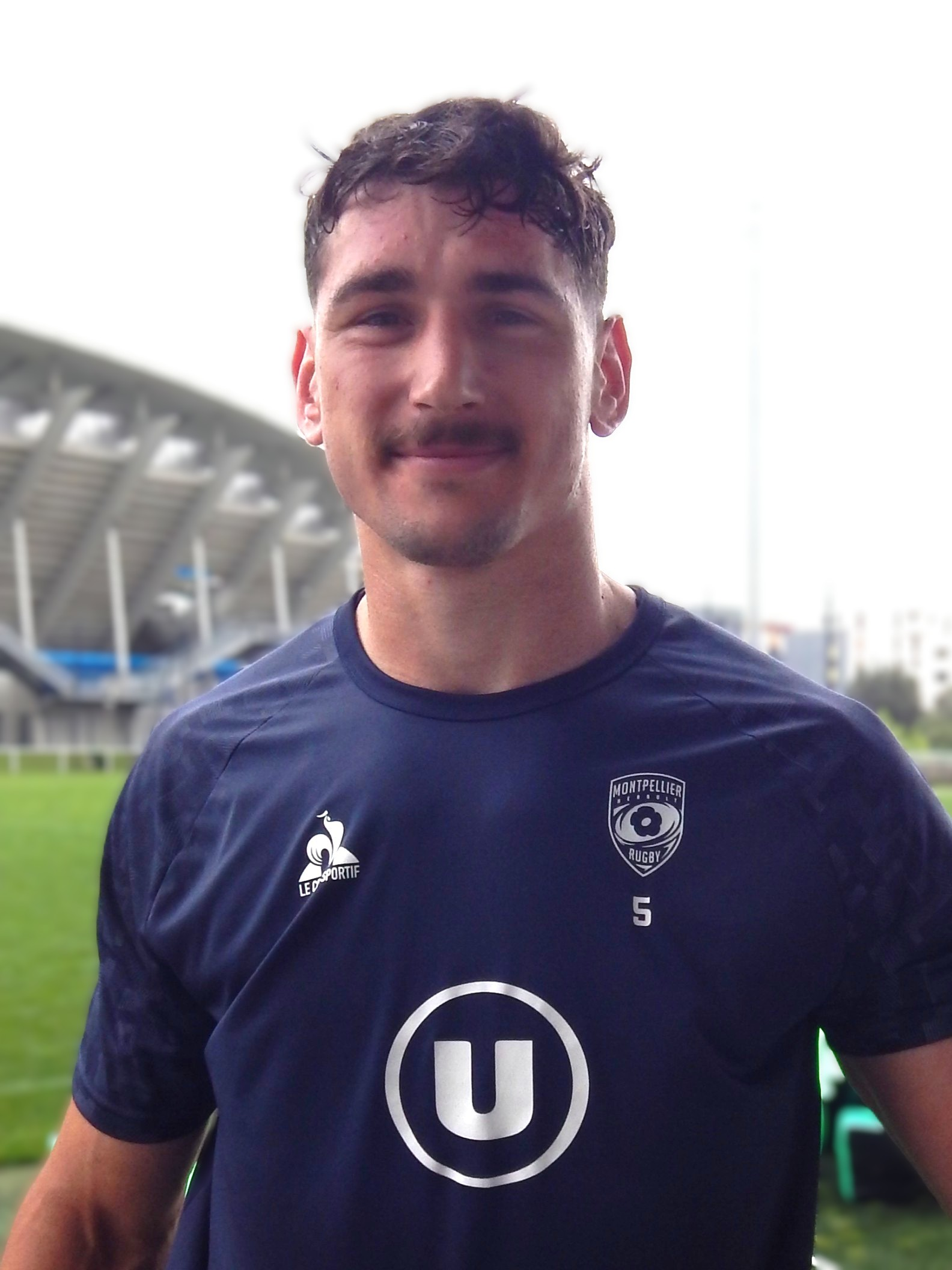
- Martins in 2025
- Born: Nicolas Martins; 18 January 1999 (age 27) Toulouse, France
- Height: 1.96 m (6 ft 5 in)
- Weight: 100 kg (15 st 10 lb)

Rugby union career
- Position: Flanker
- Current team: Colomiers
Youth career
- 2006–2013: Colomiers
- 2013–2020: AS Tournefeuille
- 2020–2021: Castanet
Senior career
Years	Team	Apps	(Points)
2021–2022	Castanet	15	(15)
2022–2024	Soyaux Angoulême	38	(40)
2024–2025	Montpellier	10	(6)
2025–	Colomiers	5	(4)
- Correct as of 17 November 2025
International career
Years	Team	Apps	(Points)
2022–	Portugal	28	(55)
- Correct as of 15 November 2025

Nicolas Martins (born 18 January 1999) is a French-born Portuguese rugby union player. His position is flanker and he currently plays for Colomiers in the Pro D2 and the Portugal national team. Martins was born in Toulouse to a Portuguese father.
