= Irakli Aptsiauri =

Georgian rugby union player

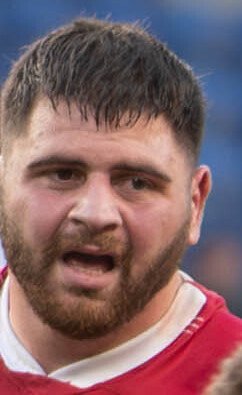
- Full name: Irakli Aptsiauri
- Born: 23 February 2003 (age 23) Georgia
- Height: 185 cm (6 ft 1 in)
- Weight: 122 kg (269 lb; 19 st 3 lb)

Rugby union career
- Position: Tight-head Prop
- Current team: FC Grenoble
Youth career
- 20??-2021: Lelo Saracens
Senior career
Years	Team	Apps	(Points)
2021-2024	FC Grenoble	50	(20)
2024-	Lyon OU	22	(0)
- Correct as of 3 July 2024
International career
Years	Team	Apps	(Points)
2021	Georgia under-18		
2023	Georgia under-20	5	(5)
2023-	Georgia	20	(0)
- Correct as of 3 July 2024

Irakli Aptsiauri (Georgian: ირაკლი აფციაური; born 23 February 2003) is a Georgian rugby union player who plays for Lyon OU in the French Top 14.

== Club career ==
Aptsiauri began his rugby career at Lelo Saracens in the capital of his home country, Tblissi. In 2021 he was signed by Pro D2 side Grenoble, making his debut in the following year against SU Agen.

== International career ==
He played in the U18 Rugby Europe Championship where he was named in the team of the tournament.

In 2023 he was part of the Georgia under-20 squad for the U20 World Championship, he featured in all of Georgia's matches starting both their wins over Argentina and Italy. He was named player of the match in the win over Italy. And he went on to score a try against New Zealand.

He was called up as a late addition to the Georgian squad for the 2023 Rugby World Cup replacing an injured Luka Japaridze. He made his international debut coming off the bench against Fiji.
