= Kyohei Morita =

Japanese rugby union footballer (born 1984)

Kyohei Morita (森田恭平) (born 6 February 1984) is a Japanese rugby union footballer who made his international debut as a fly half with the Japan national rugby union team in 2004. He graduated from Hosei University and joined Kobelco Steelers in 2006.
