= 2005 Barbarians end of season tour =

Summary
P	W	D	L
Total
2	1	0	1
Test match
2	1	0	1
Opponent
P	W	D	L
Scotland XV
1	0	0	1
England XV
1	1	0	0

The 2005 Barbarians rugby union tour was a series of matches played in May 2005 in by Barbarians F.C.

== Results ==
In the first match, Scotland won easily despite missing the players involved in the Lions tour to New Zealand.

24 May 2005

Scotland XV	38–7	Barbarians
Try: Henderson; Hall; S. Lamont; Jacobsen; Southwell; Con: Paterson (5); Pen: Paterson		Try: Lo Cicero; Con: Humphreys

Pittodrie Stadium, Aberdeen

Scotland: Chris Paterson; Rory Lamont, Mark Di Rollo, A. Henderson, Sean Lamont; G. Ross, Mike Blair; Allan Jacobsen, S. Lawson, B. Douglas, S. Grimes, S. Murray, K. Brown, A. Hogg, J. Petrie (c) – Replacements: D. Hall, E. Murray, C. Hamilton, A. Wilson, G. Beveridge, Dan Parks, Hugo Southwell.

Barbarians: G.Dempsey (Ireland); Brian Lima (Samoa), Matt Burke (Australia), Kevin Maggs (Ireland), Sereli Bobo (Fiji); David Humphreys (c; Ireland), Bryan Redpath; Andrea Lo Cicero, F. Sheahan (Ireland), D. Morris (Wales), Gary Longwell (Ireland), AJ Venter (South Africa), O. Finegan (Australia), Semo Sititi (Samoa), E. Miller (Ireland) -Replacements: Raphaël Ibañez (France), C. Visagie (South Africa), S. Boome (South Africa), J. O'Connor (Ireland), M. Robinson (New Zealand), Thomas Castaignède (France), Kenny Logan (Scotland).

Against Ireland (also without the better players involved in the Lions tour, Barbarians obtain an easy win)

28 May 2005

England XV	39–52	Barbarians

Twickenham Stadium, London
Referee: Stuart Dickson (Australia)
