= Francisco Fernandes =

Portuguese rugby union player

- Born: 6 September 1985 (age 41)
- Height: 181 cm (5 ft 11 in)
- Weight: 115 kg (254 lb; 18 st 2 lb)

Rugby union career
- Position: Prop
International career
Years	Team	Apps	(Points)
2010–	Portugal	50	(10)

Francisco Fernandes Moreira (born 6 September 1985) is a rugby union player. He plays as a prop. He was born and raised in France, but is capped by Portugal.

== Club career ==
He first played for AS Soustons. He moved to US Tyrosse, where he would play from 2005/06 to 2010/11, first at the Pro D2, and after the first season at the Fédérale 1. He moved to AS Béziers Hérault at 2011/12, at Pro D2, his first professional team, where he has been playing since then. He reached the mark of 250 games at the Pro D2 in 2021.

== International career ==
Fernandes has 50 caps for Portugal, with 2 tries scored, 10 points on aggregate, since his debut at the 14-10 loss to Russia, at 6 February 2010, in Sochi, for the 2011 Rugby World Cup qualifyings, when he was 24 years old. He has been playing more regularly for the Portuguese side since 2020. He played at the 2023 Rugby World Cup, where he was the oldest player, at 38 years old.
