= Simon Raiwalui =

Fiji international rugby union player

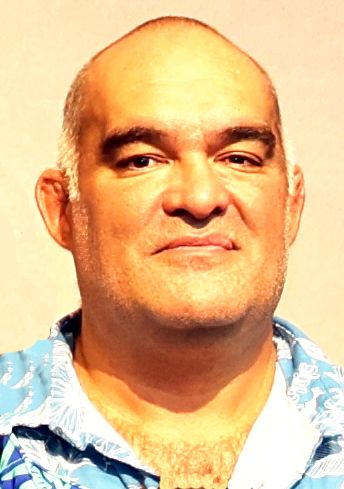
- Raiwalui in 2023
- Born: 8 September 1974 (age 52) Auckland, New Zealand
- Height: 6 ft 6 in (198 cm)
- Weight: 121 kg (267 lb)

Rugby union career
- Position: Lock
Senior career
Years	Team	Apps	(Points)
1997–1999	Sale Sharks	40	(15)
2000–2002	Newport		
2003–2007	Saracens	80	(5)
- Racing Métro 92
International career
Years	Team	Apps	(Points)
- Australian Schoolboys
1997–2006	Fiji	43	(15)
2006	Pacific Islanders	3	(0)
Coaching career
- Years: Team
- 2012–2013: Racing Métro 92 (Forwards coach)
- 2014–2017: Stade Français (Forwards coach)
- 2017–2018: Biarritz (Forwards coach)
- 2018–2020: Australia (Forwards coach)
- 2023: Fiji
- 2024–2025: Waratahs (Director of Performance)

Simon Raiwalui (born 8 September 1974) is a Fijian Australian former rugby union player and coach. He served as the General Manager for his former French club, Racing Métro 92. He has represented Fiji on a number of occasions and most recently coached the team in 2023. He has also been included in the Pacific Islanders touring team for Europe in November 2006. His usual position was lock.

== Early life ==
Raiwalui was born in Auckland, New Zealand, but was raised and educated in Australia, where, along with playing school rugby, played for club side Manly from colts level through to the under-21 side. He was also selected to represent the Australian Schoolboys alongside other footballers such as Ben Tune and Joe Roff.

== Rugby career ==
=== Playing career ===
Simon left the Manly club in Sydney, Australia to join Biggar RFC in November 1994. He played for the Lanarkshire club for the 1994/95 season before returning to Manly. In 1997 he left Australia again but this time to play rugby in England. He joined the Sale Sharks, and later moved to Wales to play for Newport. He joined Saracens in 2003 and made his debut for the club in September of that year against the Newcastle Falcons. After his years at Saracens Raiwalui finished his playing career at Racing Métro 92 in France where he moved onto coaching following his retirement.

He qualified for Fiji through his parents. He debuted for Fiji against the New Zealand in 1997, which Raiwalui has mentioned as his best moment in rugby. While with Newport, he was selected for the Fijian 1999 Rugby World Cup squad. He retired from international rugby prior to the 2003 Rugby World Cup in Australia, though he came out of retirement for Fiji in the Pacific Nations Cup in 2006, and was then selected in the combined Pacific Nations squad that toured Europe.

=== Coaching career ===
Following his retirement from rugby, Raiwalui became the forwards coach of Racing Métro 92 under head coach Gonzalo Quesada. After a fairly brief stint at Racing Métro 92 Raiwalui followed Quesada over to Stade Français where they won the 2014–15 Championship. After following Quesada to Biarritz for the 2017–18 season, Raiwalui joined Australia under the coach of Michael Cheika, whom had previously coached Stade Français. After Cheika's reign came to an end in 2019 Raiwalui joined the Fiji Rugby Union (FRU) as a High Performance Manager. In February 2023 following the resignation of Vern Cotter, Raiwalui became the head coach of the Fiji national team. In his first role as head coach Raiwalui took the team to the Quarter-finals of the 2023 Rugby World Cup.

In late 2023 Raiwalui left the FRU and joined World Rugby (WR) as a High Performance Pathways and Player Development Manager.

In June 2024 Raiwalui was confirmed to take up the role of Director of Performance with the Australian Super Rugby Pacific team, the New South Wales Waratahs. It is his first position with any Super Rugby team.

==== Statistics ====
Statistics as head coach of Fiji (2023).

Opponent	Played	Won	Drawn	Lost	W%	For	Against	Diff.
Australia	1	1	0	0	100.00	22	15	+7
England	2	1	0	1	50.00	54	52	+2
France	1	0	0	1	0.00	17	34	–17
Georgia	1	1	0	0	100.00	17	12	+5
Japan	1	1	0	0	100.00	35	12	+23
Portugal	1	0	0	1	0.00	23	24	–1
Samoa	1	1	0	0	100.00	33	19	+14
Tonga	1	1	0	0	100.00	36	20	+16
Wales	1	0	0	1	0.00	26	32	–6
Opponent	10	6	0	4	60	263	220	+43
Opponent	Played	Won	Drawn	Lost	W%	For	Against	Diff.

Sporting positions
Preceded by Vern Cotter	Fiji National Rugby Union Coach; 2020–2023	Succeeded by Mick Byrne
