= Bryan Habana =

South African rugby union player (born 1983)

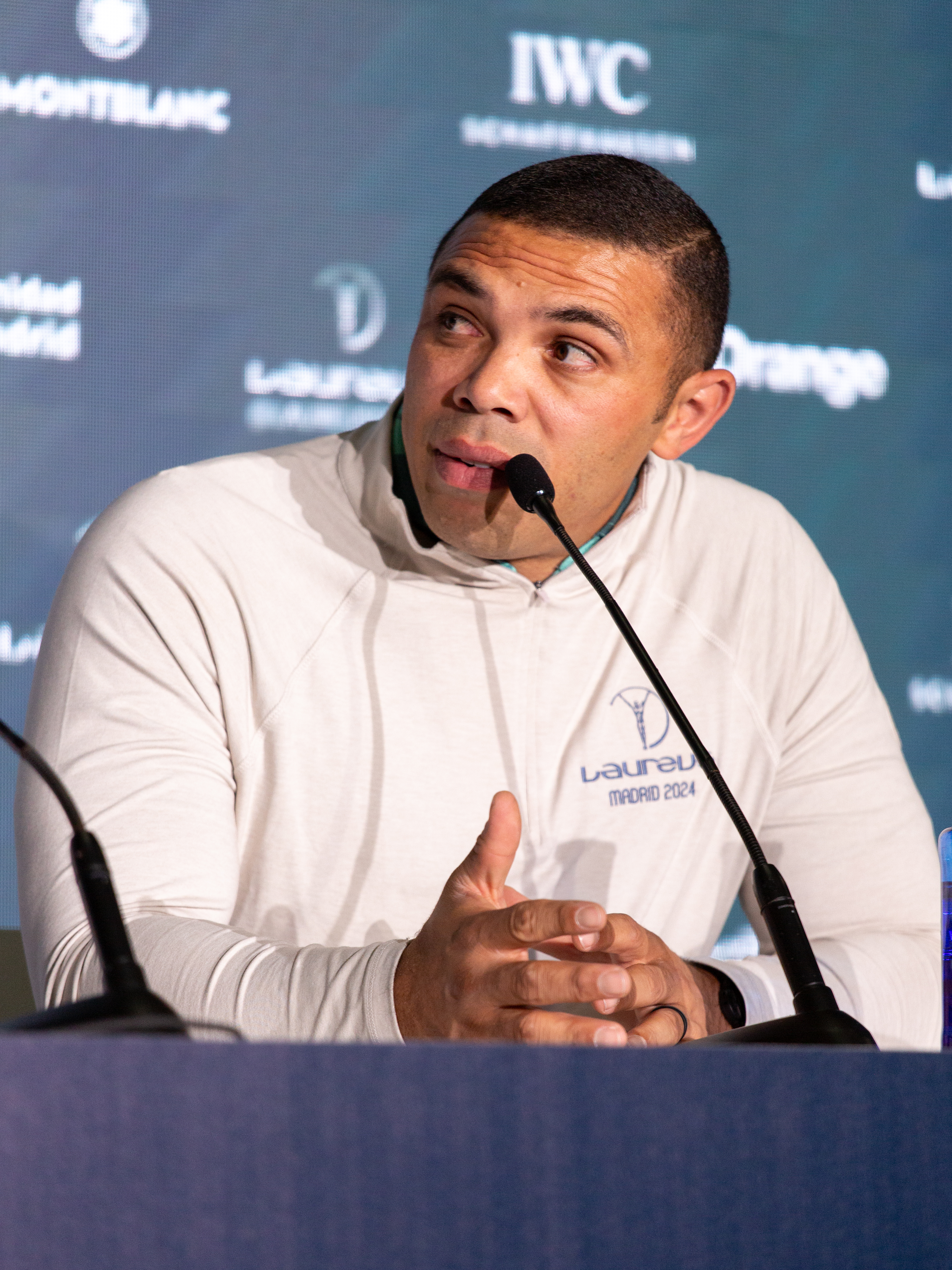
- Habana speaking at the 25th Laureus World Sports Awards in 2024
- Born: Bryan Gary Habana; 12 June 1983 (age 43) Johannesburg, South Africa
- Height: 1.80 m (5 ft 11 in)
- School: King Edward VII School
- University: Rand Afrikaans University

Rugby union career
- Position: Wing / Outside Centre
Senior career
Years	Team	Apps	(Points)
2013–2018	Toulon	66	(115)
- Correct as of 18 June 2017
Provincial / State sides
Years	Team	Apps	(Points)
2003–2004	Golden Lions	21	(85)
2005–2009	Blue Bulls	14	(45)
2010–2013	Western Province	8	(10)
- Correct as of 16 August 2015
Super Rugby
Years	Team	Apps	(Points)
2005–2009	Bulls	61	(185)
2010–2013	Stormers	57	(95)
- Correct as of 16 August 2015
International career
Years	Team	Apps	(Points)
2004	South Africa Under-21	3	(15)
2004, 2016	South Africa Sevens	4	(15)
2004–2016	South Africa (test)	124	(335)
2007	South Africa (tour)	2	(0)
2014	Springbok XV	2	(5)
- Correct as of 19 November 2016
Medal record
Men's Rugby union
Representing South Africa
Rugby World Cup
Gold medal – first place	2007 France	Squad
Bronze medal – third place	2015 England	Squad

Bryan Gary Habana OIS (born 12 June 1983) is a South African former professional rugby union player. Playing mainly as a wing, he is widely considered to be one of the greatest players in the history of the sport. He played for the Golden Lions, the Blue Bulls and Western Province in South Africa, for the Bulls and the Stormers in Super Rugby, and for Toulon in the French Top 14, and won 124 caps for the South Africa national team.

Habana was part of the South Africa team that won the 2007 Rugby World Cup and was one of the stars of the tournament, his eight tries equalling the record for a single tournament set by Jonah Lomu in 1999. He was subsequently named the 2007 IRB Player of the Year. During the 2015 Rugby World Cup Habana equalled Lomu's career record of 15 tries in World Cups. He is in second place among all time test try scorers, with 67 tries.

== Career ==
=== Early career ===
Habana was born in Johannesburg and named Bryan Gary Habana, after former Manchester United footballers Bryan Robson and Gary Bailey. Habana was educated at King Edward VII School and Rand Afrikaans University (now known as the University of Johannesburg).

He played outside centre and scrum-half in provincial and age group rugby. He was a member of the South Africa Sevens side in the 2003–2004 World Sevens Series. He made his Currie Cup debut for the Golden Lions in 2004, doing well enough to be voted the country's most promising player that year.

That November, he made his Test debut against England at Twickenham aged 21. Though the game was lost 32–16, Habana came on as a reserve to score a try with his first touch of the ball against the then World Cup holders. The following week Habana was moved into the starting line-up, where he contributed two tries to the 45–10 win over Scotland at Murrayfield. The next week, he was selected in the same position, on the left wing, in that year's final match against Argentina in Buenos Aires.

=== 2005–2007 ===
In 2005, he moved to the Blue Bulls. Following the 2005 Super 12 season, Habana was, as expected, included in the 2005 Springboks squad. He played on the left wing in South Africa's opening match of 2005 against Uruguay, whom the Springboks defeated 134–3, with Habana scoring two tries. South Africa then hosted France for a two test series; drawing the first 30-all, and winning the second 27–13, with Habana scoring two tries in both games. In the lead-up to the 2005 Tri Nations, Habana played in two tests against Australia, the first, a loss at Telstra Stadium, and then a 33–20 win at home at Ellis Park, with Habana scoring in the second Test.

Habana made his Tri Nations debut on 30 July against the Wallabies at the Bulls' home of Loftus Versfeld in Pretoria. South Africa won the match 22–16. The subsequent match against the All Blacks at Newlands was also a win for South Africa. In the second match against Australia in Perth, Habana scored two tries in the 22–19 win. The All Blacks won the last match of the series, a thrilling 31–27 win for the New Zealanders at Carisbrook. Although South Africa did not win the series, Habana had established himself on the international stage, finishing as the tournament's joint highest try-scorer with New Zealands' Doug Howlett and Joe Rokocoko. In the Currie Cup, the Blue Bulls made it to the final, which was played at home at Loftus Versfeld, against the Free State Cheetahs. The Cheetahs, somewhat underdogs, won the final. In November of that year, Habana earned caps for South Africa against Argentina, Wales and France, scoring two tries in the Welsh match. Habana was named to the five-man shortlist for 2005 IRB World Player of the Year, and was also selected by SA Rugby as 2005 South Africa Player of the Year in 2005.

The Springboks endured a poor year in 2006 as they lost four of their six tri nations matches. They also lost to France in the midyear test and lost to Ireland 32–15 – a game in which Habana was averted to centre for the first time in a Springbok shirt. He scored a try. They then lost to England in the first test but gained revenge in the second test.

In April 2007 Habana competed against a cheetah in a 100-meter race to help raise awareness of the imminent danger of the cheetah being classified as an endangered species, according to De Wildt officials. He lost, because cheetahs can run 70 mph, instead of 22 mph.

=== 2007 Super 14 ===
Habana's most dramatic act of the 2007 Super 14 season was his last minute try in the final, enabling flyhalf Derick Hougaard to make an easy conversion and giving the Bulls a dramatic 20–19 victory over the Sharks. The try was especially hard to take for Sharks fans as it was debated if Habana should have even been on the field after dangerously tackling fullback Percy Montgomery in the air, in the opening minutes of the game. Habana later admitted in an interview that, despite not intending to cause Montgomery harm, he should have been sent off for the challenge.

=== 2007 World Cup ===
Habana was selected on the wing for the Springboks first game of the 2007 Rugby World Cup, where he scored four tries in the 59–7 win over Samoa in Paris. In South Africa's final group game, he scored two tries against the US in Montpellier. He also scored two tries against Argentina in the semifinal, equalling Jonah Lomu's record of 8 tries in one World Cup. To score the first try, he chipped the defensive line, outran the cover defence, regathered the ball and scored near the corner flag. To score the second, he intercepted the ball after Argentina had gone blindside off a scrum, running nearly the length of the field to dot the ball down under the posts. He was a part of the world cup winning side contributing to the defeat of England in the 2007 final. Habana was awarded the IRB Player of the Year Award at the 2007 IRB Awards, held in Paris on 21 October.

=== 2008 season ===
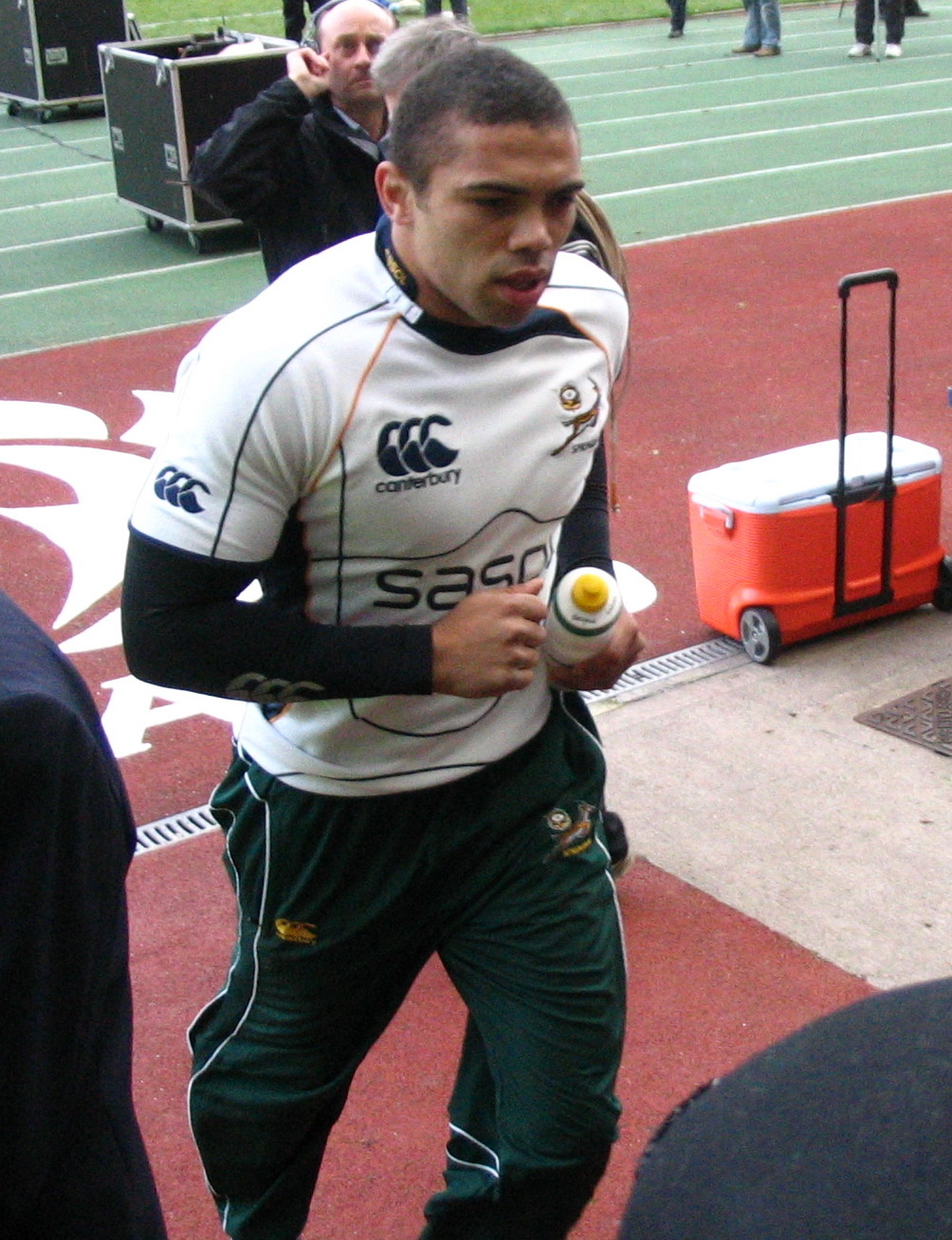
Habana in the Springbok change kit

The 2008 season wasn't Habana's greatest. Although he kept his spot in the Springboks side, he failed to make an impact like he did in the previous year. He only scored two tries in the whole year, one against the All Blacks in their 19–8 loss and one against England in the 42–6 win. The team struggled to adapt to new coach Peter de Villiers incoherent model for an expansive game, and thus the Springbok backline failed to find attacking impetus throughout that season. The Springboks had a poor year, only winning two of their six games in the 2008 Tri Nations but came back at the end of the year to win all of their Tour Matches against Wales, Scotland and England.

=== 2009 Super 14 ===
Habana had a mixed super 14 season. He was quiet on attack, but was a rock on defence, later he found his attacking form and finished the season second top try scorer, with 8 tries. This led to the Blue Bulls regaining their title as Champions of the Southern Hemisphere.

=== 2009 British & Irish Lions tour of South Africa ===
Habana had targeted the Lions tour as one of the biggest moments of his career, possibly bigger than the World Cup. In a close first test the South Africans defeated the Lions 26–21, but Habana failed to show the form he had displayed in the Super 14. In the second test, the Lions were more fired up and led 19–8 with 20 minutes to go before Habana burst through their defence and scored one of his most memorable tries. The Springboks went on to win after his Bulls teammate Morné Steyn kicked a last gasp penalty from 53 metres (58 yd). Habana was rested for the final test, a game which South Africa would rather forget as they lost 28–9 but with their series win they gained revenge after losing the 1997 tour.

=== 2009 Tri Nations ===
After the Lions series came the Tri-Nations. New Zealand beat Australia in the opening game 22–16, so the pressure was on South Africa to claim a victory over the All Blacks in their opener at Bloemfontein. They did this with a 28–19 win. They played the All Blacks at Durban the following week. This was Habana's 50th test and South Africa won 31–19 with Morné Steyn scoring all 31 points. This was the first time they'd beaten the All Blacks in successive games at home in 33 years (South Africa won 3 out of 4 home tests against New Zealand in 1976). The next week they took on Australia in Cape Town. South Africa once again came home with a 29–17 win. This meant they'd won all of their home games in the tournament for the first time since 2005 putting them on course for their first championship win since 2004. If South Africa take the 2009 Tri-Nations title it would be Habana's first tournament win meaning he would have won every tournament in professional southern hemisphere rugby. South Africa then won their first away-game and their 4th match out of 4 in the Tri Nations with a 32–25 victory over the Wallabies at Subiaco Oval in Perth. Habana scored 2 of the 4 tries. The Springboks would take on the Wallabies in Brisbane a week later, but this time they were outmuscled 21–6. This kept New Zealand in with a chance of claiming the tournament. Habana played well, making a try-saving tackle on Lachie Turner, but came off at halftime with an injury. He was however declared fit for the visit to New Zealand as the Springboks claimed victory by 32–29, to win their first Tri Nations title since 2004. It was also Habana's first success in that tournament.

=== Barbarians 2009 ===
On 5 December, Habana played on the left wing for the Barbarians for their 'Final Challenge' against New Zealand. He scored 3 tries as the Barbarians defeated the All Blacks, who had not lost a match in the Northern hemisphere in 2 years.

=== Provincial Move ===
In 2009 Habana moved to Cape Town, to play for Western Province and the Stormers starting in 2010. Habana played for the Stormers in a losing Super Rugby final in 2010, a losing Currie Cup final for Western Province in 2010 and a winning Currie Cup final in 2012.

=== 2011 Rugby World Cup ===
Habana was selected for the 2011 Rugby World Cup and played the first game which South Africa won against Wales 17-16 thanks to tries from François Steyn and Hougaard. They were then victorious against Fiji and Namibia before beating Samoa just 13–5 in which Habana scored a ninth minute try. South Africa however were then knocked out of the tournament by Australia in the quarter-finals by 11–9.

=== 2012 ===
Habana played two tests against England in the June internationals and 5 tests in The Rugby Championship against Argentina, Australia and New Zealand. He scored a hat trick of tries against Australia as well as tries, home and away, against the All Blacks

=== Toulon ===
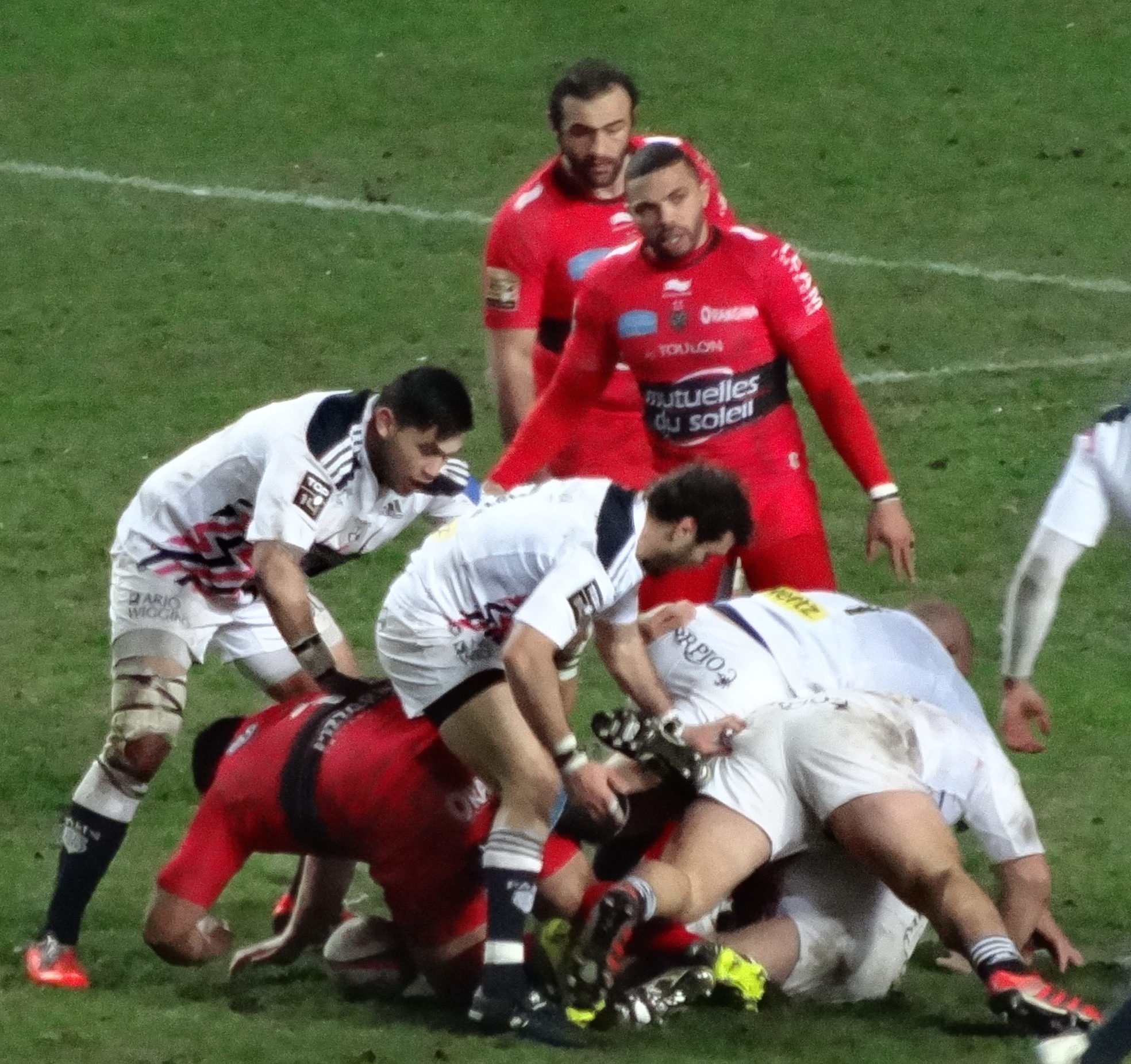
Habana with Toulon, vs Stade Français

On 11 January 2013, Habana confirmed he would move to French club Toulon at the end of the 2013 Super Rugby season, on a three-year contract. Toulon won the Heineken Cup and Top 14 in 2014 and the European Champions Cup in 2015. Habana scored an intercept try against Leinster in the 2015 Champions Cup semi-final to progress in extra-time.

=== 2015 Rugby World Cup ===
Habana was selected for the 2015 Rugby World Cup, where he equalled Jonah Lomu's record of 15 World Cup tries with a hat-trick against the USA. South Africa lost 20–18 in the semi-finals to eventual champions New Zealand and subsequently finished third.

Habana was made vice-captain of South Africa in 2016, and brought his career try tally to 67.

=== Retirement ===
On 24 April 2018, Habana announced his retirement from all rugby at the end of his French Top 14 club Toulon's season.

=== International tries ===
Try	Opposing team	Location	Venue	Competition	Date	Result	Score
1	England	London, England	Twickenham Stadium	2004 end-of-year rugby union internationals	20 November 2004	Loss	32 – 16
2	Scotland	Edinburgh, Scotland	Murrayfield Stadium	2004 end-of-year rugby union internationals	27 November 2004	Win	10 – 45
3	Scotland	Edinburgh, Scotland	Murrayfield Stadium	2004 end-of-year rugby union internationals	27 November 2004	Win	10 – 45
4	Uruguay	East London, South Africa	Basil Kenyon Stadium	2005 June rugby union test	11 June 2005	Win	134 – 3
5	Uruguay	East London, South Africa	Basil Kenyon Stadium	2005 June rugby union test	11 June 2005	Win	134 – 3
6	France	Durban, South Africa	Kings Park Stadium	2005 France rugby union tour of South Africa and Australia	18 June 2005	Draw	30 – 30
7	France	Durban, South Africa	Kings Park Stadium	2005 France rugby union tour of South Africa and Australia	18 June 2005	Draw	30 – 30
8	France	Port Elizabeth, South Africa	EPRU Stadium	2005 France rugby union tour of South Africa and Australia	25 June 2005	Win	27 – 13
9	France	Port Elizabeth, South Africa	EPRU Stadium	2005 France rugby union tour of South Africa and Australia	25 June 2005	Win	27 – 13
10	Australia	Johannesburg, South Africa	Ellis Park Stadium	2005 June rugby union test	23 July 2005	Win	33 – 20
11	Australia	Perth, Australia	Subiaco Oval	2005 Tri Nations Series	20 August 2005	Win	19 – 22
12	Australia	Perth, Australia	Subiaco Oval	2005 Tri Nations Series	20 August 2005	Win	19 – 22
13	New Zealand	Dunedin, New Zealand	Carisbrook	2005 Tri Nations Series	27 August 2005	Loss	31 – 27
14	Wales	Cardiff, Wales	Millennium Stadium	2005 end-of-year rugby union internationals	19 November 2005	Win	16 – 33
15	Wales	Cardiff, Wales	Millennium Stadium	2005 end-of-year rugby union internationals	19 November 2005	Win	16 – 33
16	New Zealand	Rustenburg, South Africa	Royal Bafokeng Stadium	2006 Tri Nations Series	2 September 2006	Win	21 – 20
17	Ireland	Dublin, Ireland	Lansdowne Road	2006 South Africa rugby union tour of Ireland and England	11 November 2006	Loss	32 – 15
18	England	Bloemfontein, South Africa	Free State Stadium	2007 England rugby union tour of South Africa	26 May 2007	Win	58 – 10
19	England	Bloemfontein, South Africa	Free State Stadium	2007 England rugby union tour of South Africa	26 May 2007	Win	58 – 10
20	England	Pretoria, South Africa	Loftus Versfeld Stadium	2007 England rugby union tour of South Africa	2 June 2007	Win	55 – 22
21	England	Pretoria, South Africa	Loftus Versfeld Stadium	2007 England rugby union tour of South Africa	2 June 2007	Win	55 – 22
22	Scotland	Edinburgh, Scotland	Murrayfield Stadium	2007 Rugby World Cup warm-up matches	25 August 2007	Win	3 – 27
23	Samoa	Paris, France	Parc des Princes	2007 Rugby World Cup	9 September 2007	Win	59 – 7
24	Samoa	Paris, France	Parc des Princes	2007 Rugby World Cup	9 September 2007	Win	59 – 7
25	Samoa	Paris, France	Parc des Princes	2007 Rugby World Cup	9 September 2007	Win	59 – 7
26	Samoa	Paris, France	Parc des Princes	2007 Rugby World Cup	9 September 2007	Win	59 – 7
27	United States	Montpellier, France	Stade de la Mosson	2007 Rugby World Cup	30 September 2007	Win	64 – 15
28	United States	Montpellier, France	Stade de la Mosson	2007 Rugby World Cup	30 September 2007	Win	64 – 15
29	Argentina	Saint-Denis, France	Stade de France	2007 Rugby World Cup	14 October 2007	Win	37 – 13
30	Argentina	Saint-Denis, France	Stade de France	2007 Rugby World Cup	14 October 2007	Win	37 – 13
31	New Zealand	Wellington, New Zealand	WestPac Stadium	2008 Tri Nations Series	5 July 2008	Loss	19 – 8
32	England	London, England	Twickenham Stadium	2008 South Africa rugby union tour of Europe	22 November 2008	Win	8 – 42
33	British and Irish Lions	Pretoria, South Africa	Loftus Versfeld Stadium	2009 British & Irish Lions tour to South Africa	27 June 2009	Win	28 – 25
34	Australia	Perth, Australia	Subiaco Oval	2009 Tri Nations Series	29 August 2009	Win	25 – 32
35	Australia	Perth, Australia	Subiaco Oval	2009 Tri Nations Series	29 August 2009	Win	25 – 32
36	Italy	Udine, Italy	Stadio Friuli	2009 end-of-year rugby union internationals	21 November 2009	Win	10 – 32
37	Italy	Witbank, South Africa	Puma Rugby Stadium	2010 June rugby union tests	19 June 2010	Win	29 – 13
38	Italy	East London, South Africa	Buffalo City Stadium	2010 June rugby union tests	26 June 2010	Win	55 – 11
39	Namibia	Auckland, New Zealand	North Harbour Stadium	2011 Rugby World Cup	22 September 2011	Win	87 – 0
40	Samoa	Auckland, New Zealand	North Harbour Stadium	2011 Rugby World Cup	30 September 2011	Win	13 – 5
41	Argentina	Cape Town, South Africa	Newlands Stadium	2012 Rugby Championship	18 August 2012	Win	27 – 6
42	Australia	Perth, Australia	Patersons Stadium	2012 Rugby Championship	8 September 2012	Loss	26 – 19
43	New Zealand	Dunedin, New Zealand	Forsyth Barr Stadium	2012 Rugby Championship	15 September 2012	Loss	21 – 11
44	Australia	Pretoria, South Africa	Loftus Versfeld Stadium	2012 Rugby Championship	29 September 2012	Win	31 – 8
45	Australia	Pretoria, South Africa	Loftus Versfeld Stadium	2012 Rugby Championship	29 September 2012	Win	31 – 8
46	Australia	Pretoria, South Africa	Loftus Versfeld Stadium	2012 Rugby Championship	29 September 2012	Win	31 – 8
47	New Zealand	Johannesburg, South Africa	FNB Stadium	2012 Rugby Championship	6 October 2012	Loss	16 – 32
48	Italy	Durban, South Africa	Mr Price Kings Park	2013 June rugby union tests	8 June 2013	Win	44 – 10
49	Samoa	Pretoria, South Africa	Loftus Versfeld Stadium	2013 June rugby union tests	22 June 2013	Win	56 – 23
50	Samoa	Pretoria, South Africa	Loftus Versfeld Stadium	2013 June rugby union tests	22 June 2013	Win	56 – 23
51	Argentina	Johannesburg, South Africa	FNB Stadium	2013 Rugby Championship	17 August 2013	Win	73 – 13
52	New Zealand	Johannesburg, South Africa	Coca-Cola Park	2013 Rugby Championship	5 October 2013	Loss	27 – 38
53	New Zealand	Johannesburg, South Africa	Coca-Cola Park	2013 Rugby Championship	5 October 2013	Loss	27 – 38
54	Wales	Durban, South Africa	Growthpoint Kings Park	2014 Wales rugby union tour of South Africa	14 June 2014	Win	38 – 16
55	Wales	Durban, South Africa	Growthpoint Kings Park	2014 Wales rugby union tour of South Africa	14 June 2014	Win	38 – 16
56	Argentina	Salta, Argentina	Estadio Padre Ernesto Martearena	2014 Rugby Championship	23 August 2014	Win	31 – 33
57	Italy	Padua, Italy	Stadio Euganeo	2014 end-of-year rugby union internationals	22 November 2014	Win	6 – 22
58	Argentina	Durban, South Africa	Growthpoint Kings Park	2015 Rugby Championship	8 August 2015	Loss	25 – 37
59	Argentina	Buenos Aires, Argentina	José Amalfitani Stadium	2015 Rugby World Cup warm-up matches	15 August 2015	Win	12 – 26
60	Samoa	Birmingham, England	Villa Park	2015 Rugby World Cup	26 September 2015	Win	46 – 6
61	Scotland	Newcastle-upon-Tyne, England	St. James' Park	2015 Rugby World Cup	3 October 2015	Win	34 – 16
62	United States	London, England	Olympic Stadium	2015 Rugby World Cup	7 October 2015	Win	64 – 0
63	United States	London, England	Olympic Stadium	2015 Rugby World Cup	7 October 2015	Win	64 – 0
64	United States	London, England	Olympic Stadium	2015 Rugby World Cup	7 October 2015	Win	64 – 0
65	Argentina	Salta, Argentina	Estadio Padre Ernesto Martearena	2016 Rugby Championship	27 August 2016	Loss	26 – 24
66	New Zealand	Christchurch, New Zealand	AMI Stadium	2016 Rugby Championship	17 September 2016	Loss	41 – 13
67	Italy	Florence, Italy	Stadio Artemio Franchi	2016 end-of-year rugby union internationals	19 November 2016	Loss	20 – 18

== Honours ==
Golden Lions

- Vodacom Cup: 2003, 2004

Blue Bulls

- Currie Cup: 2009

Bulls

- Super Rugby: 2007, 2009

Western Province

- Currie Cup: 2012

Toulon

- Heineken Cup European Champions/European Rugby Champions Cup: 2014, 2015
- Top 14 French League: 2014

South Africa

- Rugby World Cup: 2007
- Tri-Nations: 2009
- Lions series winner: 2009

South Africa Rugby Union Awards

- SARU Player of the Year: 2005, 2007 and 2012
- SuperSport Try of the year: 2007, 2012

International Rugby Board awards

- International Rugby Board Player of the Year: 2007
- International Rugby Players' Association Try of the Year: 2012
- World Rugby Hall of Fame Inductee Number 166: 2023

== Personal life ==
On 20 September 2009, Habana married his longtime girlfriend, Janine Viljoen.

== See also ==
- List of international rugby union tries by Bryan Habana
