= 1985 Fiji rugby union tour of Australia =

Summary
P	W	D	L
Total
10	4	1	5
Test match
2	0	0	2
Opponent
P	W	D	L
Australia
2	0	0	2

The 1985 Fiji rugby union tour of Australia was a series of matches played in July–August 1985 in Australia by the Fiji national rugby union team.

== Results ==
13 July 1985

Sydney	27 - 27	Fiji XV
	report

Sports Ground, Sydney

17 July 1985

Australian University	24 - 26	Fiji XV
	report

Ballymore, Brisbane

20 July 1985

Queensland	47 - 6	Fiji XV
	report

Ballymore, Brisbane

24 July 1985

Queensland Country	10 - 39	Fiji XV
	report

Rockhampton

27 July 1985

New South Wales Country	16 - 32	Fiji XV
	report

Singleton

31 July 1985

A.C.T.	24 - 23	Fiji XV
	report

Canberra

3 August 1985

New South Wales	43 - 10	Fiji XV
	report

Sports Ground, Sydney

6 August 1985

New South Wales B	16 - 36	Fiji XV

Grahame Park, Gosford

10 August 1985

Australia	52 - 28	Fiji

Ballymore, Brisbane

17 August 1985

Australia	31 - 9	Fiji
	report

Cricket Ground, Sydney
