= 1995 Argentina rugby union tour of Australia =

Summary
P	W	D	L
Total
5	1	0	4
Test match
2	0	0	2
Opponent
P	W	D	L
Australia
2	2	0	0

The 1995 Argentina rugby union tour of Australia was a series of eight matches played by the Argentina national rugby union team in April and May 1995, in Australia, in order to prepare the 1995 Rugby World Cup

== Matches ==
Scores and results list Argentina's points tally first.

Opposing Team	For	Against	Date	Venue	Status
ACT	16	33	22/4/1995	Manuka Oval, Canberra	Tour Match
Queensland B	34	24	25/4/1995	Ballymore Stadium, Brisbane	Tour Match
Australia	7	53	30/4/1995	Ballymore, Brisbane	Test Match
New South Wales B	16	42	3/5/1995	Wade Park, Orange	Tour Match
Australia	13	30	6/5/1995	Football Stadium, Sydney	Test Match
