= 1996 Canada rugby union tour of Australia =

- Manager: D Whidden
- Tour captain: J Graf
Summary
P	W	D	L
Total
5	2	0	3
Test match
1	0	0	1
Opponent
P	W	D	L
Australia
1	0	0	1

The 1996 Canada rugby union tour of Australia was a series of rugby union matches played during June 1996 in Australia by the Canada national rugby union team.

== Results ==
Scores and results list Canada's points tally first.

Opponent	For	Against	Date	Venue	Status
Queensland B	6	23	15 June 1996	Rockhampton	Tour match
New South Wales	19	44	19 June 1966	Newcastle	Tour match
South Australia	19	13	22 June 1966	Adelaide	Tour match
Australian Universities	19	6	25 June 1966	Sydney	Tour match
Australia	9	74	29 June 1996	Ballymore Oval, Brisbane	Test match

== See also ==
- List of Canada national rugby union team test matches
