= Christian Wade =

England international rugby union, American football player and rugby league footballer

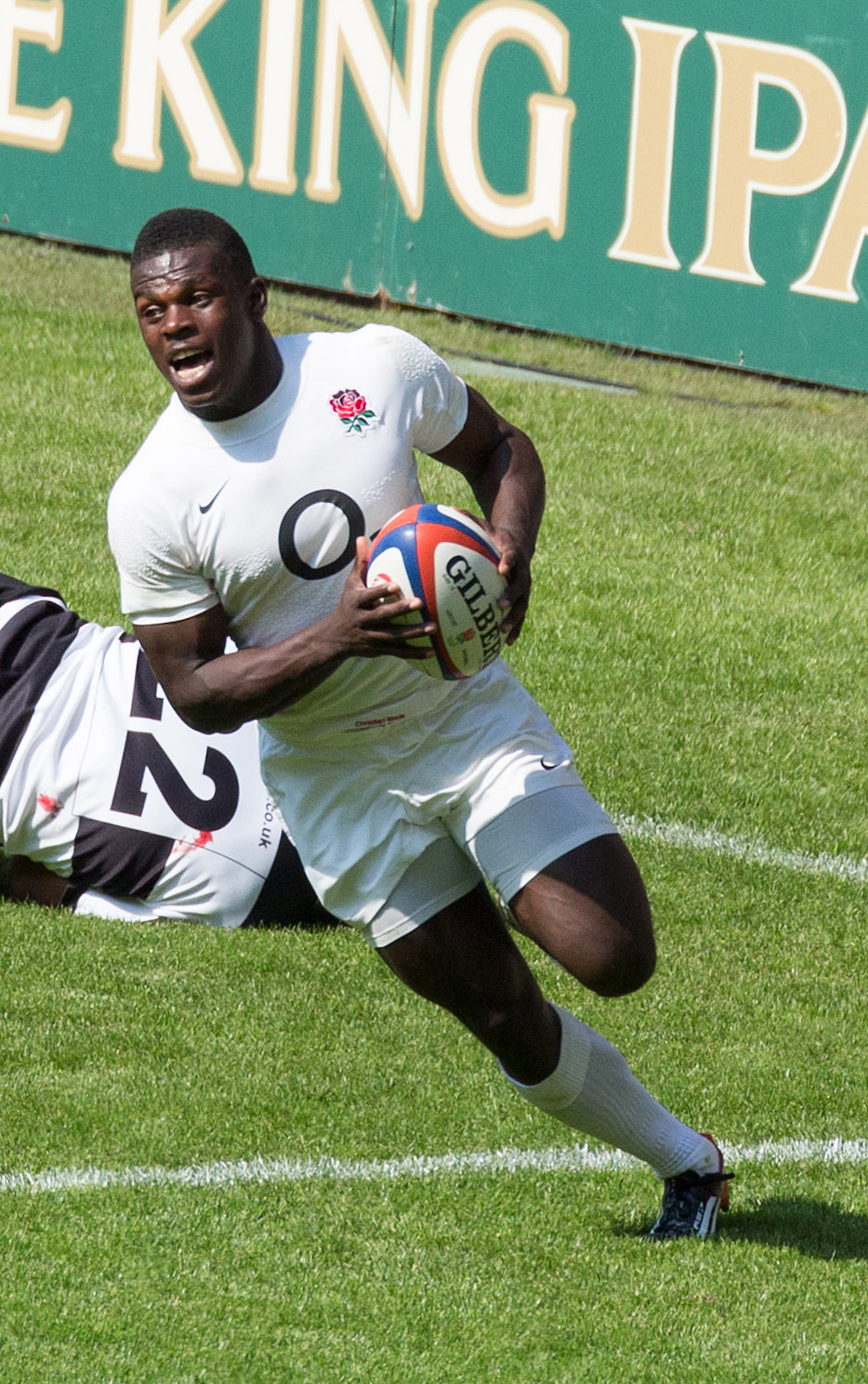
- Wade for England in 2012
- Full name: Christian Wade
- Born: 15 May 1991 (age 35) Slough, England
- Height: 1.75 m (5 ft 9 in)
- Weight: 85 kg (187 lb; 13 st 5 lb)
- School: Royal Grammar School, High Wycombe
- University: St Mary's University College

Rugby union career
- Position: Wing
- Current team: Newcastle Red Bulls
Youth career
- Chinnor
Senior career
Years	Team	Apps	(Points)
2011–2018	Wasps	165	(495)
2022–2024	Racing 92	25	(50)
2024–2025	Gloucester	19	(60)
2025–	Newcastle Red Bulls	18	(50)
- Correct as of 24 October 2026
International career
Years	Team	Apps	(Points)
2009–2011	England U20	8	(40)
2011	England A	6	(45)
2013	England	1	(0)
2013	British & Irish Lions	0	(0)
National sevens team
Years	Team		Comps
2009–2010	England 7s		7
- Football career

No. 45
- Position: Running back

Career history
- Buffalo Bills (2019–2022)*
- * Offseason or practice squad member only
- Stats at Pro Football Reference
- Rugby league career

Playing information
- Position: Wing
Club
Years	Team	Pld	T	G	FG	P
2025	Wigan Warriors	2	2	0	0	8

Christian Wade (born 15 May 1991) is an English professional rugby union player, former American football player, and former rugby league footballer, who currently plays wing for Prem Rugby club Newcastle Red Bulls. He currently jointly holds the record for the most tries scored in the top flight of English rugby alongside Chris Ashton.

Wade played for Wasps for seven seasons and scored 82 tries in Premiership Rugby, which places him fifth in the best try scorers list. In October 2018, he switched to American football to pursue a career in the National Football League. He spent three seasons as a running back for the Buffalo Bills' practice squad and then returned to rugby union in August 2022.

In 2013, Wade played one international match for England, against Argentina.

== Early life ==
Raised in High Wycombe, Buckinghamshire, Wade attended Hamilton Primary School and Royal Grammar School. He was not initially interested in rugby union but picked it up as it was the RGS's primary sport. He represented England U16 A, England U18 and England U20, and Wasps at the Middlesex Sevens as a schoolboy. A former district and English Schools athlete, Wade ran a time of 10.8 seconds over the 100m distance at the age of 16. He was trained by the former English sprinter Julian Golding.

After finishing school, Wade studied Sports science and Psychology at St Mary's University College in Twickenham while playing for the Wasps' academy side and then the senior team. As of 14 February 2017, he had a 0.623 tries per game ratio for Wasps with 76 tries in 122 matches. For the England Saxons, Wade had a 1.5 tries per game ratio, scoring nine tries in six matches.

== Rugby union and league career ==
=== Club career ===
==== Wasps ====
Wade made his debut for Wasps RFC in Abu Dhabi on 30 January 2011 against Harlequins by replacing Jack Wallace in the 48th minute of the 13–38 defeat in the 2010–2011 Season. He made three further appearances that season scoring one try against Exeter Chiefs.

Wade had a strong 2011–12 season, when despite missing three months with injury, he finished the season as the second-highest try scorer in the Premiership with nine in 15 games.

At the end of the 2012–13 season, Wade was named both the Players' Player of the Year and the Young Player of the Year after a good season for Wasps. He finished level with club teammate Tom Varndell as the Premiership's joint leading try-scorer with 13. Wade also scored five tries in the 2012–13 European Challenge Cup including their quarter-final defeat against Leinster. Overall he scored 18 tries in 26 appearances in that season.

In the 2013–2014 season, Wade made ten appearances and scored five tries before an injury against London Irish in November ended his season. After eight months of rehabilitation, he made his return against Saracens, scoring two tries in defeat. He scored 12 more tries in the next 21 games.

On 16 April 2016, Wade equalled the Premiership record by scoring six tries in one match against Worcester Warriors. At the end of that campaign he played in a Champions Cup semi-final loss against Saracens. The following 2016–17 season saw Wasps top the table and Wade started in the final which saw them lose to Exeter after extra time to finish runners up.

=== First return to rugby union (2022–2025) ===
Wade made a return to rugby in August 2022 in a sevens tournament for French side Racing 92. A permanent move to the side was confirmed in September 2022. His last appearance for the club came in the 2023–24 Top 14 season quarter-final elimination against Bordeaux Bègles.

On 13 March 2024, Wade would make his return to the English Premiership after 6 years as he signs for Gloucester for the 2024-25 season.

=== Rugby League (2025) ===
In April 2025, Wade signed a short-term contract with rugby league club Wigan Warriors until the end of the 2025 season. On 4 June, Wade made his rugby league debut in a reserves game against Castleford Tigers at The Jungle, with no senior league games taking place that weekend, as a result of the Challenge Cup final. Wigan won the game 56–10. Wade made his first team début on 11 July, scoring a try in a 30–10 victory over Huddersfield Giants.

=== Second return to rugby union (2025–) ===
==== Newcastle Red Bulls ====
On 8 September 2025, it was announced that Wade would be joining the newly-rebranded Newcastle Red Bulls at the conclusion of his time with Wigan Warriors in rugby league. In December 2025, he made his debut for the club in the Challenge Cup during a 14–10 victory against Lions. During the match, he went off in the first thirty minutes after sustaining a head injury.

In October 2026, he scored a hat-trick of tries in a 34–28 defeat to Exeter Chiefs. This included his 100th try in the Prem and put him one behind the all time record of 101 held by Chris Ashton. In the following league fixture, he equalled the record held by Ashton during a 17–3 victory over Sale Sharks.

=== International career ===
==== Sevens ====
Wade made his international sevens debut at the IRB Sevens World Series in Dubai in December 2009 and he scored 7 tries in George a week later, finishing joint top try scorer with Fijian wizard, William Ryder. He added 2 more in Wellington and three more tries in Las Vegas a week later. He scored 3 in London. Overall, he amassed 22 tries in 7 tournaments in the 2009–10 Series, which made him the 15th highest individual try scorer that season. Wade was selected for the 17-man initial England rugby sevens training squad for the 2010 Commonwealth Games in Delhi.

==== U20s ====
Wade was a member of the England U20 squad that finished fourth at the 2010 IRB Junior World Championship and scored his only try of the tournament against hosts Argentina during the pool stage. He was part of the side that completed a grand slam during the 2011 Six Nations Under 20s Championship and scored in the penultimate round against Scotland. Later that year he scored six tries at the 2011 IRB Junior World Championship including in the final against New Zealand which England lost to finish runners up.

==== England, Saxons and Lions ====
On 27 May 2012, Wade started for England against the Barbarians in an uncapped fixture at Twickenham which saw him score a try while also setting up Jonathan Joseph in the last play of the game with some elusive footwork in a 57–26 victory. He was included on the 2012 tour of South Africa and scored a hat-trick during the trip.

Wade was a member of the senior squad for their 2013 tour of Argentina and scored during a warm-up 40–12 victory over the Barbarians. On 8 June 2013 Wade made his Test debut playing the whole 80 minutes in a win against Los Pumas. This was ultimately his only cap for England.

Wade was selected for the second game against Argentina the following week but withdrew from the team when he was called up to join the 2013 British & Irish Lions tour to Australia. He made his Lions debut on the right wing against the ACT Brumbies Super Rugby side.

Wade was initially selected to play against Argentina in the 2013 Autumn Internationals, however a slight hamstring tear meant he had to withdraw from the game. He was overlooked for the 2014 Internationals, but was selected for England Saxons to play against the Irish Wolfhounds. In June 2016 Wade scored the winning try for England Saxons as they completed a series win over South Africa A at Outeniqua Park.

==== International tries ====
Try	Opposing team	Location	Venue	Competition	Date	Result	Score
†	Barbarians	London, England	Twickenham	Summer International	27 May 2012	Win	57 – 26
‡ x3	South African Barbarians (South)	Kimberley, South Africa	Griquas Park	2012 Tour of South Africa	13 June 2012	Win	54 – 26
†	Barbarians	London, England	Twickenham	Summer International	26 May 2013	Win	40 – 12
†	Ireland Wolfhounds	Cork, Ireland	Musgrave Park		30 January 2015	Win	18 – 9

† Full international cap not awarded for Barbarians Test match.

‡ Full international cap not awarded for South African Barbarians South Test match.

== American football career ==
In October 2018, Wade left rugby to pursue a career in the NFL, with Wasps releasing him from his contract.

On 8 April 2019, Wade was allocated as a running back to the Buffalo Bills as part of the NFL's International Player Pathway program.

Several months later, on 9 August 2019, for his debut with his new team, Wade had a 65-yard touchdown run on his first carry in the pre-season game against the Indianapolis Colts.

On 31 August 2019, Wade was waived by the Bills and re-signed to the practice squad the following day. He signed a reserve/future contract with the Bills on 6 January 2020.

On 27 April 2020, Wade was given a roster exemption as an international player for a second season. He was waived on 5 September, and signed to the practice squad the next day. Wade was placed on the practice squad/COVID-19 list by the team on 28 December, and restored to the practice squad four days later. On 26 January 2021, Wade signed a reserves/futures contract with the Bills.

On 4 May 2021, Wade was given a roster exemption as an international player for a third season. On 1 April 2022, he was released by the Bills.
