= Dom Shipperley =

Australia international rugby union player

- Born: Dominic Shipperley; 4 January 1991 (age 35) Redcliffe, Queensland, Australia
- Height: 1.86 m (6 ft 1 in)
- Weight: 94 kg (14 st 11 lb; 207 lb)
- School: St Joseph's College, Nudgee

Rugby union career
- Position(s): Wing, Fullback
Senior career
| Years | Team | Apps | (Points) |
| 2015−2016 | Melbourne Rising | 10 | (10) |
- Correct as of 15 October 2016
Super Rugby
| Years | Team | Apps | (Points) |
| 2011−2014 | Reds | 44 | (65) |
| 2015−2016 | Rebels | 19 | (25) |
- Correct as of 6 November 2017
International career
| Years | Team | Apps | (Points) |
| 2012 | Australia | 3 | (0) |
| 2010 | Australia U20 | 4 | (15) |
| 2008 | Australian Schools | | |
- Correct as of 30 September 2012
National sevens team
| Years | Team | | Comps |
| 2010 | Australia | | 3 |

Dominic Shipperley (born 4 January 1991) is an Australian retired professional rugby union footballer who played for the Australian national team in both test rugby and rugby sevens. In Super Rugby, he played four seasons with the Queensland Reds from 2011 to 2014, and a further two seasons for the Melbourne Rebels. His regular playing position was wing.

== Early life ==
Shipperley was born in Redcliffe, Queensland. He attended St Joseph's College, Nudgee and in 2008 received an OP1 which is the highest possible mark that can be achieved in the Queensland Certificate of Education. He played for the Australian Schoolboys rugby team in 2008, and with the Brothers club in Brisbane.

== Rugby career ==
Shipperley was selected for the Australian Sevens squad during the 2009–10 IRB Sevens World Series, playing in the Wellington, Adelaide, and Hong Kong tournaments in the team which finished the series in third place.

As a member of the Australia under 20 team that competed in the 2010 IRB Junior World Championship in Argentina, he scored a hat-trick of tries in the team's win against South Africa, with Australia finishing runner-up in the tournament. He was also selected for the Under 20s squad in 2011, but did not travel to the tournament due to his Super Rugby commitments with the Queensland Reds.

Shipperley made his Super Rugby debut for the Reds during the 2011 Super Rugby season against the Hurricanes. His breakthrough year came in 2012, beginning in the first game of the Reds' season with his last-minute match winning try against the Waratahs. A 75-metre sprint beating six defenders to score ended a nine-year losing drought for the Reds in Sydney and earned Shipperley the Super Rugby Try of the Year accolade. He started in all 17 matches for the Reds in 2012, and won the Most Improved Player award for the Reds.

Later in 2012 Shipperley received a starting Test debut for Australia against South Africa for the match in Perth after an injury forced out winger Drew Mitchell. He went on to gain two further caps in the 2012 Rugby Championship.

In June 2014 he signed a two-year deal to join the Melbourne Rebels beginning in 2015. A few weeks later, while playing for the Reds against the Rebels, he suffered a badly fractured and dislocated ankle requiring surgery. Shipperley managed to recover from that injury for the Rebels' opening game of the season, however, playing in a famous 20–10 away win against the Crusaders in Christchurch, He went on to score four tries from twelve Super Rugby matches in 2015.

Shipperley continued his good form for the Rebels in 2016, but missed the second half of the Super Rugby season due to a knee injury. Later that year he ruptured his anterior cruciate ligament during the 2016 National Rugby Championship semi-final, forcing him out of all rugby for 2017.

He was initially included in the Rebels' extended playing squad for 2018, and played in the Brisbane Global Rugby Tens before a further knee injury prompted his retirement from rugby in the early part of the 2018 season.

== Super Rugby statistics ==
As of 15 July 2018

| Season | Team | Games | Starts | Sub | Mins | Tries | Cons | Pens | Drops | Points | Yel | Red |
|---|---|---|---|---|---|---|---|---|---|---|---|---|
| 2011 | Reds | 6 | 2 | 4 | 274 | 2 | 0 | 0 | 0 | 10 | 0 | 0 |
| 2012 | Reds | 17 | 17 | 0 | 1360 | 8 | 0 | 0 | 0 | 40 | 0 | 0 |
| 2013 | Reds | 11 | 8 | 3 | 621 | 1 | 0 | 0 | 0 | 5 | 0 | 0 |
| 2014 | Reds | 10 | 8 | 2 | 598 | 2 | 0 | 0 | 0 | 10 | 0 | 0 |
| 2015 | Rebels | 12 | 12 | 0 | 960 | 4 | 0 | 0 | 0 | 20 | 0 | 0 |
| 2016 | Rebels | 7 | 7 | 0 | 478 | 1 | 0 | 0 | 0 | 5 | 0 | 0 |
| 2017 | Rebels | 0 | 0 | 0 | 0 | 0 | 0 | 0 | 0 | 0 | 0 | 0 |
| 2018 | Rebels | 0 | 0 | 0 | 0 | 0 | 0 | 0 | 0 | 0 | 0 | 0 |
| Total | | 63 | 54 | 9 | 4291 | 18 | 0 | 0 | 0 | 90 | 0 | 0 |

== Sources ==
- "Annual Report 2010" (PDF). Australian Rugby. 2010. Archived from the original (PDF 7.6 MB) on 14 February 2014.
