= 2009 Dubai Sevens =

World Rugby Sevens Series tournament

The Dubai Sevens is played annually as part of the IRB Sevens World Series for international rugby sevens (seven-a-side version of rugby union). The 2009 competition was held on December 4 and 5 at The Sevens. It was the first of eight events in the 2009–10 IRB Sevens World Series. New Zealand won the tournament with a 24–12 victory over Samoa in the final.

This was the second edition of the Dubai Sevens to be held at The Sevens. Previous editions were held at the Dubai Exiles Rugby Ground.

== Format ==
The tournament consists of four round-robin pools of four teams. All sixteen teams progress to the knockout stage. The top two teams from each group progress to quarter-finals in the main competition, with the winners of those quarter-finals competing in cup semi-finals and the losers competing in plate semi-finals. The bottom two teams from each group progress to quarter-finals in the consolation competition, with the winners of those quarter-finals competing in bowl semi-finals and the losers competing in shield semi-finals.

== Teams ==
- Arabian Gulf
- Argentina
- Australia
- England
- Fiji
- France
- Kenya
- New Zealand
- Portugal
- Russia
- Samoa
- Scotland
- South Africa
- United States
- Wales
- Zimbabwe

== Pool stages ==
=== Pool A ===
Team	Pld	W	D	L	PF	PA	+/-	Pts
South Africa	3	3	0	0	93	21	72	9
Australia	3	2	0	1	61	43	18	7
Wales	3	1	0	2	71	42	29	5
Arabian Gulf	3	0	0	3	14	133	-119	3

Date	Team 1	Score	Team 2
2009-12-04	South Africa	28 - 14	Wales
2009-12-04	Australia	47 - 7	Arabian Gulf
2009-12-04	South Africa	36 - 7	Arabian Gulf
2009-12-04	Australia	14 - 7	Wales
2009-12-04	Wales	50 - 0	Arabian Gulf
2009-12-04	South Africa	29 - 0	Australia

=== Pool B ===
Team	Pld	W	D	L	PF	PA	+/-	Pts
Samoa	3	2	1	0	88	24	64	8
Fiji	3	2	1	0	90	38	52	8
Zimbabwe	3	0	1	2	36	88	-52	4
Scotland	3	0	1	2	36	100	-64	4

Date	Team 1	Score	Team 2
2009-12-04	Fiji	47 - 12	Scotland
2009-12-04	Samoa	40 - 5	Zimbabwe
2009-12-04	Fiji	31 - 14	Zimbabwe
2009-12-04	Samoa	36 - 7	Scotland
2009-12-04	Scotland	17 - 17	Zimbabwe
2009-12-04	Fiji	12 - 12	Samoa

=== Pool C ===
Team	Pld	W	D	L	PF	PA	+/-	Pts
England	3	3	0	0	95	22	73	9
Kenya	3	2	0	1	67	58	9	7
Russia	3	1	0	2	19	66	-47	5
United States	3	0	0	3	50	85	-35	3

Date	Team 1	Score	Team 2
2009-12-04	England	40 - 12	United States
2009-12-04	Kenya	26 - 5	Russia
2009-12-04	England	28 - 0	Russia
2009-12-04	Kenya	31 - 26	United States
2009-12-04	United States	12 - 14	Russia
2009-12-04	England	27 - 10	Kenya

=== Pool D ===
Team	Pld	W	D	L	PF	PA	+/-	Pts
New Zealand	3	3	0	0	105	20	85	9
Argentina	3	2	0	1	72	57	15	7
Portugal	3	1	0	0	31	88	-57	5
France	3	0	0	3	36	79	-43	3

Date	Team 1	Score	Team 2
2009-12-04	New Zealand	34 - 0	Portugal
2009-12-04	Argentina	22 - 12	France
2009-12-04	New Zealand	33 - 10	France
2009-12-04	Argentina	40 - 7	Portugal
2009-12-04	Portugal	24 - 14	France
2009-12-04	New Zealand	38 - 10	Argentina

== Knockout ==
=== Shield ===
Quarter-finals
December 5 - The Sevens, Dubai
Wales	19
Scotland	12
December 5 - The Sevens, Dubai
Portugal	0
United States	5
December 5 - The Sevens, Dubai
Russia	21
France	22
December 5 - The Sevens, Dubai
Zimbabwe	28
Arabian Gulf	19

Semi-finals
December 5 - The Sevens, Dubai
Scotland	5
Portugal	29
December 5 - The Sevens, Dubai
Russia	26
Arabian Gulf	12

Final
December 5 - The Sevens, Dubai
Portugal	14
Russia	17

=== Bowl ===
Quarter-finals
December 5 - The Sevens, Dubai
Wales	19
Scotland	12
December 5 - The Sevens, Dubai
Portugal	0
United States	5
December 5 - The Sevens, Dubai
Russia	21
France	22
December 5 - The Sevens, Dubai
Zimbabwe	28
Arabian Gulf	19

Semi-finals
December 5 - The Sevens, Dubai
Wales	33
United States	12
December 5 - The Sevens, Dubai
France	14
Zimbabwe	27

Final
December 5 - The Sevens, Dubai
Wales	38
Zimbabwe	7

=== Plate ===
Quarter-finals
December 5 - The Sevens, Dubai
New Zealand	17
Kenya	14
December 5 - The Sevens, Dubai
South Africa	5
Fiji	17
December 5 - The Sevens, Dubai
England	17
Argentina	12
December 5 - The Sevens, Dubai
Samoa	28
Australia	27

Semi-finals
December 5 - The Sevens, Dubai
Kenya	14
South Africa	19
December 5 - The Sevens, Dubai
Argentina	12
Australia	26

Final
December 5 - The Sevens, Dubai
South Africa	0
Australia	7

=== Cup ===
Quarter-finals
December 5 - The Sevens, Dubai
New Zealand	17
Kenya	14
December 5 - The Sevens, Dubai
South Africa	5
Fiji	17
December 5 - The Sevens, Dubai
England	17
Argentina	12
December 5 - The Sevens, Dubai
Samoa	28
Australia	27

Semi-finals
December 5 - The Sevens, Dubai
New Zealand	19
Fiji	0
December 5 - The Sevens, Dubai
England	19
Samoa	28

Final
December 5 - The Sevens, Dubai
New Zealand	24
Samoa	12

== Statistics ==
=== Individual points ===
Individual Points
Pos.	Player	Country	Points
1	Lolo Lui	Samoa	49
2	Ben Gollings	England	46
3	Clinton Sills	Australia	45
4	Sherwin Stowers	New Zealand	45
5	Vasily Artemyev	Russia	40
6	William Ryder	Fiji	40
7	Mikaele Pesamino	Samoa	40
8	Mzwandile Stick	South Africa	40
9	Junior Tomasi Cama	New Zealand	38
10	Rayno Benjamin	South Africa	35

=== Individual tries ===
Individual Tries
Pos.	Player	Country	Tries
1	Clinton Sills	Australia	9
2	Sherwin Stowers	New Zealand	9
3	Vasily Artemyev	Russia	8
4	Mikaele Pesamino	Samoa	8
5	Rayno Benjamin	South Africa	7
6	Alex Cuthbert	Wales	7
7	Nicolas Bruzzone	Argentina	6
8	Collins Injera	Kenya	6
9	Humphrey Kayange	Kenya	6
10	Nick Edwards	United States	5

== Notes and references ==
Preceded by Edinburgh Sevens	Dubai Sevens; 2009	Succeeded by George Sevens
