= Stephen Betham =

Samoan rugby union player

- Born: Stephen Betham Samoa

Rugby union career
- Position: Coach
- Current team: No current team
International career
Years	Team	Apps	(Points)
- Samoa U-20
Coaching career
- Years: Team
- 2009-2012: Samoa sevens
- 2012-2015: Samoa
- Correct as of 17 September 2015

Stephen Betham is the former head coach of the Samoa national rugby union team, that regularly participated in the World Rugby Pacific Nations Cup. Betham, who played for Samoa U-20's at a young age, has spent most his rugby career as a coach.

== Samoa sevens team ==
Betham was previously head coach of the Samoa sevens side from 2009, where he led the team to victory in the 2010 USA Sevens, 2010 Adelaide Sevens, 2010 Hong Kong Sevens and 2010 Edinburgh Sevens to claim the 2009–10 IRB Sevens World Series title in his first year in charge. Samoa failed to make as much of an impact in 2010/11, finishing fifth on the table, only making a Cup final once, losing to England 29–21 in the 2010 Dubai Sevens.

== Samoa national team (2012-2015) ==
In 2012, he was appointed head coach of the Manu Samoa team, on a four-year contract until after the 2015 Rugby World Cup. This came just weeks after being named assistant coach for Manu Samoa, with the Australian Adrian Thompson in the sights of the Samoa Rugby Union, though Thompson turned the job down, to give Betham the role of head coach. His first match in charge came on 5 June 2012 during the 2012 IRB Pacific Nations Cup, where Betham led Samoa to a 20–18 victory over Tonga. This was backed up by a further 2 victories over Fiji 29–26, and Japan 27–26 to claim Samoa's first PNC title since 2010. On 23 June, Samoa push a strong Scotland side in Apia, to go down narrow losers 17–16. During Samoa's end-of-year tour, Betham led Samoa to a 26–19 victory over Wales at the Millennium Stadium, which was Samoa's first win over Wales since 1999. That also saw Samoa rise to seventh in the World Rugby Rankings, Samoa's highest ever positioning and the highest any tier 2 nation had got to.

In 2013, Samoa played in a quadrangular tournament with hosts South Africa, Scotland and Italy. After beating Scotland for their first ever time, 27–17, then Italy 39–10, Samoa would face the Springboks in the tournament decider. South Africa dominated the full 80 minutes, scoring 8 tries to win 56–23. In November 2013, Bethan led Samoa to a white wash end-of-year tour, losing to Ireland 40–9, and Georgia 16–15.

In 2014, Samoa returned to the PNC, and opened their campaign with an 18–all draw against Tonga in Apia, followed by an 18–13 win over Fiji. Between those tests, they also beat Italy 15–0 in a Mid year test. Later that year, Italy claimed revenge, beating Samoa 24–13, before Manu Samoa went down 28–9 to England in London.

In July 2015, Betham led Samoa to a first ever home match against the All Blacks. Despite leading 16–12 at half time, the All Blacks claimed the victory 25–16. Betham later led Samoa to the final of the 2015 World Rugby Pacific Nations Cup, haven beaten the United States 21–16, and Canada 21–20, to set up a second encounter with Fiji in the final. Samoa and Fiji had previously played each other in the Cross-pool matches, but that ended in a 30–all draw. Fiji were victors in the final running out 39–29 winners. On 19 October 2015, Betham stood down as Samoan head coach following a disappointing 2015 Rugby World Cup. Samoa came fourth in their Pool, with their only victory coming against the United States 25–16. Samoa who were largely expected to finish second in their group, went on to lose to South Africa 46–6, Japan 26–5, a record defeat, and Scotland 33–36. That meant they even failed to automatically qualify for the 2019 Rugby World Cup.

== Honors ==
- World Rugby Pacific Nations Cup
  - Winners: 2012
  - Runners-up: 2014 (joint with United States), 2015.
- South African quadrangular tournament
  - Runners-up: 2013

Sporting positions
Preceded by (Samoa) Titimaea Tafua	Samoan national rugby coach 2012–2015	Succeeded by (New Zealand) Alama Ieremia
