= Samoa national rugby sevens team =

Samoa
- Union: Samoa Rugby Football Union
- Nickname: Manu Sāmoa
- Coach: Vacant
- Captain: Alatasi Tupou
- Most caps: Uale Mai (359 matches)
- Top scorer: Uale Mai (1,320)
- Most tries: Mikaele Pesamino (161)
Team kit

World Cup Sevens
- Appearances: 8 (First in 1993)
- Best result: Third place (1997, 2009)

The Samoa national rugby sevens team (Samoan: ʻau lakapī toʻafitu o Sāmoa), referred to as Samoa Sevens or Manu Sāmoa 7s (Samoan: [ˈmanʉ saːˈmoːa]), competes in the annual World Rugby Sevens Series. Representing the polynesian country of Samoa, with a population of about 202,000, the team competes against some of the wealthiest countries in the world. The Samoa sevens team is overseen by the Samoa Rugby Football Union, which oversees all of rugby union in Samoa.

Samoa won the 2009–10 World Series by winning four tournaments – the Hong Kong Sevens, the USA Sevens, the Adelaide Sevens, and the Edinburgh Sevens. Samoa has played at all Rugby World Cup Sevens finals tournaments since the championship began in 1993; its best finish was third place in 1997 and again in 2007.

Samoa has won four Oceania Sevens titles since the first competition in 2008. They have also won all four gold medals at the Pacific Games Sevens and Pacific Mini Games Sevens between 2007 and 2013, defeating Fiji in the final on each occasion.

== History ==
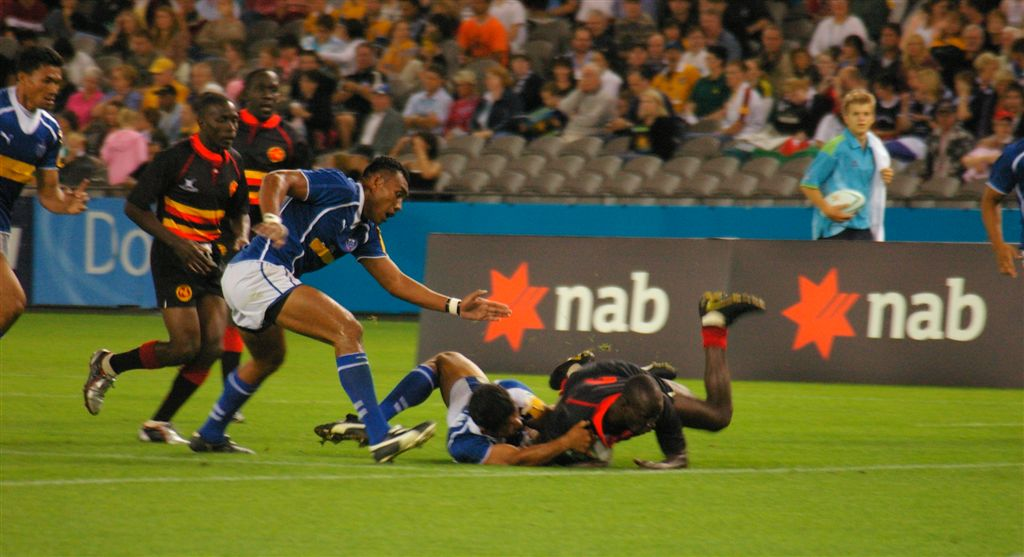
Uganda v Samoa (20 March 2006)

The first Samoan sevens team was selected in November 1978 to play at the invitation Hong Kong Sevens under the leadership of former SRU representative captain, Tuatagaloa Keli Tuatagaloa. The team included Rev-Dr Faitala Talapusi as captain, Lemalu Roy Slade (Brisbane) as vice-captain, Rev. Paul Gray (Melbourne), Peter Schmidt, Feausiga Sililoto, Rev - Andrew Leavasa (USA), Salafuti Patu and others. Samoa won the 1993 Hong Kong Sevens.

== Tournament history ==
=== Summer Olympics ===
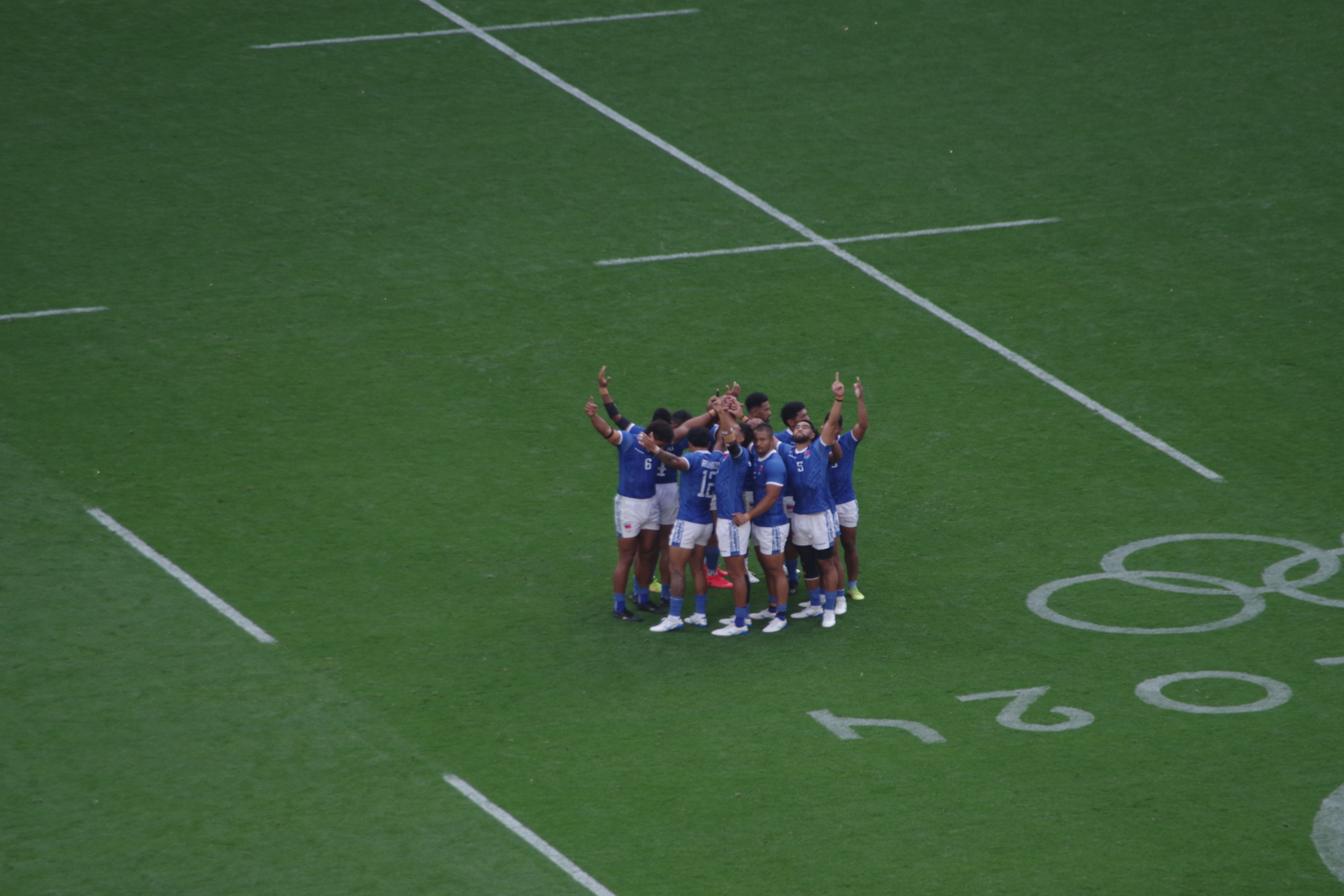
Samoa sevens team at the 2024 Summer Olympics

Olympic Games record
Year	Round	Position	Pld	W	L	D	Qualifying
(Brazil) 2016	Did not qualify						Lost 12–19 to Spain in the final of the final qualifying tournament.
(Japan) 2020	Did not qualify						Lost 31–0 to France in the semifinal of the final qualifying tournament.
(France) 2024	9th Place Final	10th	5	2	3	0	Won Oceania Olympic Qualifying
Total	0 Titles	1/3	5	2	3	0	-

In qualifying rounds for the 2016 Olympics, Samoa finished in third place at the 2015 Oceania Sevens Championship, meaning they didn't qualify directly for the Olympics as Oceania's representative. They instead went to the 2016 inter-continental final qualifying tournament, where they lost to Spain 12–19 in the final and failed to qualify for the 2016 Olympics.

=== Rugby World Cup Sevens ===
1993 Rugby World Cup Sevens - Murrayfield, Scotland

Western Samoa was in Pool D with England, Canada, Spain, Namibia and Hong Kong. After the first of Pool games Western Samoa remained undefeated along with South Africa and New Zealand.

In the quarterfinals Western Samoa was in Pool E alongside Tonga Fiji and Ireland. Western Samoa only win was against Tonga 42–7.

Team list

Coach: Taufusi Salesa

Manager: Marina Schaffhausen

1. Andrew Aiolupo (Moata'a)
2. Alama Ieremia (Wellington)
3. Danny Kaleopa (Moata'a)
4. Lolani Koko (Moata'a)
5. Brian Lima (Marist St Joseph)
6. Veli Patu (Vaiala)
7. Ofisa Tonu'u (Wellington)
8. To'o Vaega (Vaiala)
9. Sila Vaifale (Marist St Joseph)
10. Alefaio Vaisuai (Moata'a)

1997 Rugby World Cup Sevens - British Hong Kong

Western Samoa was in Pool C with Argentina and Morocco won both of its games. Western Samoa advanced to the Cup Quarter - finals to play England, winning 21 - 5. In the Cup Semi – Finals lost to eventual winners Fiji 38–14.

Team list

1. Kalolo Toleafoa
2. Isaac Fe'aunati
3. Rudolf Moors
4. Brian Lima
5. Tainafi Patu
6. Afato So'oalo
7. Terry Fanolua
8. Sila Vaifale
9. Laiafi Papali'i
10. Semo Sititi

2001 Rugby World Cup Sevens - Argentina

Western Samoa was in Pool D alongside Australia, Wales, United States, Portugal and Hong Kong. Western Samoa advanced to the Cup Quarterfinal, where they would meet New Zealand and eventually exit the tournament with a loss 45 -7.

Team list

Coach: Filipo Saena

1. Tim Cowley
2. Gaolo Elisara
3. Ron Fanuatanu
4. Daniel Farani
5. Ailaoa Samania
6. Toa Samania
7. Semo Sititi
8. Steven So'oialo
9. Luke Mealamu
10. Tanner Vili

2005 Rugby World Cup Sevens - Hong Kong

Samoa was in Pool B alongside England, France, Georgia, Chinese Taipei and Italy. Three teams, Samoa, England and France, won four of its five pool games, but Samoa did not advance to the Cup Quarterfinals because the Points For and Points Against difference was lower of the second placed France. England (+123), France (+82) and Samoa (+79).

Samoa move on the Plate competition and win against Ireland Quarter-finals (19–14), then beat Russia in Semi-finals (19–12) and eventually defeating Portugal to secure the World Cup Plate Final for 2005.

Team list

Coach: John Schuster

1. Lome Fa'atau
2. Sailosi Tagicakibau
3. Paul Perez
4. Junior Leota
5. Kiri Mariner
6. Gaolo Elisara
7. Apoua Stewart
8. Brian Lima
9. Uale Mai
10. Samu Eteuati
11. Mark Tanuvasa
12. David Lemi

Rugby World Cup Sevens Record
Year	Round	Position	Games	Won	Lost	Drew	Most tries	Most points
(Scotland) 1993	Quarterfinals	5th	8	6	2	0		
(Hong Kong) 1997	Semifinals	3rd	6	5	1	0		
(Argentina) 2001	Quarterfinals	5th	6	4	2	0		
(Hong Kong) 2005	Plate finals	9th	8	7	1	0		
(United Arab Emirates) 2009	Semifinals	3rd	5	4	1	0		
(Russia) 2013	Plate finals	10th	6	4	2	0		
(United States) 2018	Challenge quarterfinals	13th	5	3	2	0	Joe Perez (4)	Alatasi Tupou (24)
(South Africa) 2022	7th Place Final	8th	4	1	3	0		
Total	2 bronze medals	8/8	48	34	14	0	Brian Lima (17)	Brian Lima (101)

=== Commonwealth Games ===
Commonwealth record
Year	Round	Position	Pld	W	L	D
(Malaysia) 1998	Semifinalists	4th	7	4	2	1
(England) 2002	Semifinalists	4th	6	2	4	0
(Australia) 2006	Plate semifinalists	7th	5	2	3	0
(India) 2010	Plate winners	5th	6	4	2	0
(Scotland) 2014	Semifinalists	4th	6	4	2	0
(Australia) 2018	Group stage	9th-T	3	1	2	0
(England) 2022	Fifth place playoff	5th	6	4	2	0
Total	Three fourth-place finishes		36	20	15	1

== World Rugby Sevens Series ==
While long a solidly competitive side, Samoa emerged as contenders in the 2006-07 Sevens World Series, finishing third overall while winning two events – the Wellington Sevens and Hong Kong Sevens. The team reached the final four times in a row, playing against series favourite Fiji.

=== 2009–10 IRB Sevens World Series ===
Samoa won the 2009–10 Series in large part due to 2010 World Rugby Sevens Player of the Year Mikaele Pesamino who led all players with 56 tries scored. Samoa were also helped by the efforts of half-back Lolo Lui, another nominee for 2010 Sevens Player of the Year, who scored 264 points. Samoa's third star that season was forward Alafoti Faosiliva, who scored 29 tries and was also a Sevens Player of the Year nominee.

The itinerary for the 2009–10 IRB Sevens World Series:

2009–10 itinerary
Leg	Venue	Date	Winner
Dubai	The Sevens	4–5 December 2009	New Zealand
South Africa	Outeniqua Park, George	11–12 December 2009	New Zealand
New Zealand	Westpac Stadium, Wellington	5–6 February 2010	Fiji
United States	Sam Boyd Stadium, Las Vegas	13–14 February 2010	Samoa
Australia	Adelaide Oval, Adelaide	19–21 March 2010	Samoa
Hong Kong	Hong Kong Stadium	26–28 March 2010	Samoa
London	Twickenham	22–23 May 2010	Australia
Edinburgh	Murrayfield, Edinburgh	29–30 May 2010	Samoa

Overall standings

2009–10 standings
Pos.	Country	Dubai	South Africa (George)	New Zealand (Wellington)	USA (Las Vegas)	Australia (Adelaide)	Hong Kong	England (London)	Scotland (Edinburgh)	Overall
1	Samoa	20	6	20	24	24	30	16	24	164
2	New Zealand	24	24	16	20	12	25	12	16	149
3	Australia	12	6	12	16	16	16	24	20	122
4	Fiji	16	20	24	8	6	20	8	6	108
5	England	16	12	16	6	4	20	6	16	96
6	South Africa	8	8	8	12	8	10	20	6	80
7	Argentina	6	16	0	0	16	0	16	8	62
8	Kenya	6	16	6	16	0	8	0	0	52
9	Wales	4	4	4	6	6	0	6	4	34
10	United States	0	0	0	4	20	8	0	0	32
11	Canada	DNP	DNP	6	0	DNP	5	4	0	15
12	Scotland	0	0	0	0	0	0	0	12	12

=== Sevens Series tournament Cup wins ===
Event	Venue	Winner	Score	Runner-up
2022 South Africa Sevens	Cape Town Stadium	Samoa	12–7	New Zealand
2016 Paris Sevens	Stade Jean Bouin	Samoa	29–26	Fiji
2012 Dubai Sevens	The Sevens Stadium	Samoa	26–15	New Zealand
2012 USA Sevens	Sam Boyd Stadium	Samoa	26–19	New Zealand
2010 Edinburgh Sevens	Murrayfield Stadium	Samoa	41–14	Australia
2010 Hong Kong Sevens	Hong Kong Stadium	Samoa	24–21	New Zealand
2010 Adelaide Sevens	Adelaide Oval	Samoa	38–10	United States
2010 USA Sevens	Sam Boyd Stadium	Samoa	33–12	New Zealand
2008 London Sevens	Westpac Stadium	Samoa	19–14	Fiji
2007 Hong Kong Sevens	Hong Kong Stadium	Samoa	27–22	Fiji
2007 Wellington Sevens	Westpac Stadium	Samoa	14–7	Fiji
2011 Safari Sevens	Nyayo National Stadium	Samoa	31–12	Samurai Sevens
2005 Safari Sevens	RFUEA Ground	Samoa	50-5	Western Province
1993 Hong Kong Sevens	Hong Kong Stadium	Western Samoa	14–12	Fiji
1992 Middlesex Sevens	Twickenham Stadium	Western Samoa	30–6	London Scottish

In July 1997, the Government of Samoa changed the country's name from Western Samoa to Samoa.

In December 2022, Samoa won the Cape Town Sevens, defeating New Zealand 12–7 in the final to claim their first Series Cup title since 2016. Samoa had previously won the Paris Sevens in 2016, coming from 7–26 down to beat Fiji 29–26 in the final.

== Players ==
=== Current squad ===
The following players were selected to represent Samoa during the 2023–24 SVNS tournament beginning in December 2023.

Note: Caps reflect the total number of SVNS events competed in as of the 2023 South Africa Sevens.

Player	Position	Date of birth (age)	Caps	Club/province
Vaovasa Afa Su'a (c)	Forward	11 October 1991 (age 35)	18	Tama Uli
BJ Telefoni Lima	Forward	1999 (age 26–27)	6	Marist St. Joseph
Taunuu Niulevaea	Forward	21 January 2000 (age 26)	14	Safotu
Motu Opetai	Forward	20 June 2001 (age 25)	18	Matāfala
Paulo Scanlan	Forward	9 August 1996 (age 30)	25	Moata'a
Elisapeta Alofipo	Back	11 December 1997 (age 28)	28	Tama Uli
Faafoi Falaniko	Back	14 March 2002 (age 24)	17	Tepatasi
Faamaoni Junior Lalomilo	Back	10 July 2000 (age 26)	3	Marist St. Joseph
Malakesi Masefau	Back	9 January 2005 (age 21)	4	Tepatasi
Levi Milford	Back	18 September 2001 (age 25)	10	Marist St. Joseph
Pelasio Samuelu Niuula	Back	2001 (age 24–25)	2	Tepatasi
Taitaifono Senio Tavita	Back	2004 (age 21–22)	2	Apia Maroons
Paul Eti Slater	Back	12 September 1993 (age 33)	14	Laulii Lions

== Records and statistics ==
=== Former squads ===
Samoa team to the 2015 Pacific Games

Squad to 2015 Pacific Games:

- Fa'alemiga Selesele
- Tila Mealoi
- Tunufai Tunufai
- Phoenix Hunapo-Nofoa
- Alefosio Tapili
- Alex Samoa
- Tomasi Alosio
- Belgium Tuatagaloa
- Alamanda Motuga
- Ed Fidow
- Savelio Ropati
- Samoa Toloa
Samoa team to the 2014 Commonwealth Games

2014 Commonwealth Games Squad
- Afa Aiono
- Alex Samoa
- Levi Asifaamatala
- Fa'alemiga Selesele
- Lio Lolo
- Saena Vili
- Alatasi Tupou
- Lolo Lui
- Reupena Levasa
- Tulolo Tulolo
- Etiuefa Fiavaai
- Samoa Toloa
- Sonny Fereti
- George Antaky

=== Notable former players ===
Two of the highest points and try scorers in series history, Uale Mai and Mikaele Pesamino, played for Samoa. Pesamino was also named the 2010 IRB International Sevens Player of the Year, an honour which Uale Mai, a former team captain and one of the most capped players in the sport, had won in 2006. Captain Lolo Lui and teammate Alafoti Fa'osiliva had also been nominated.

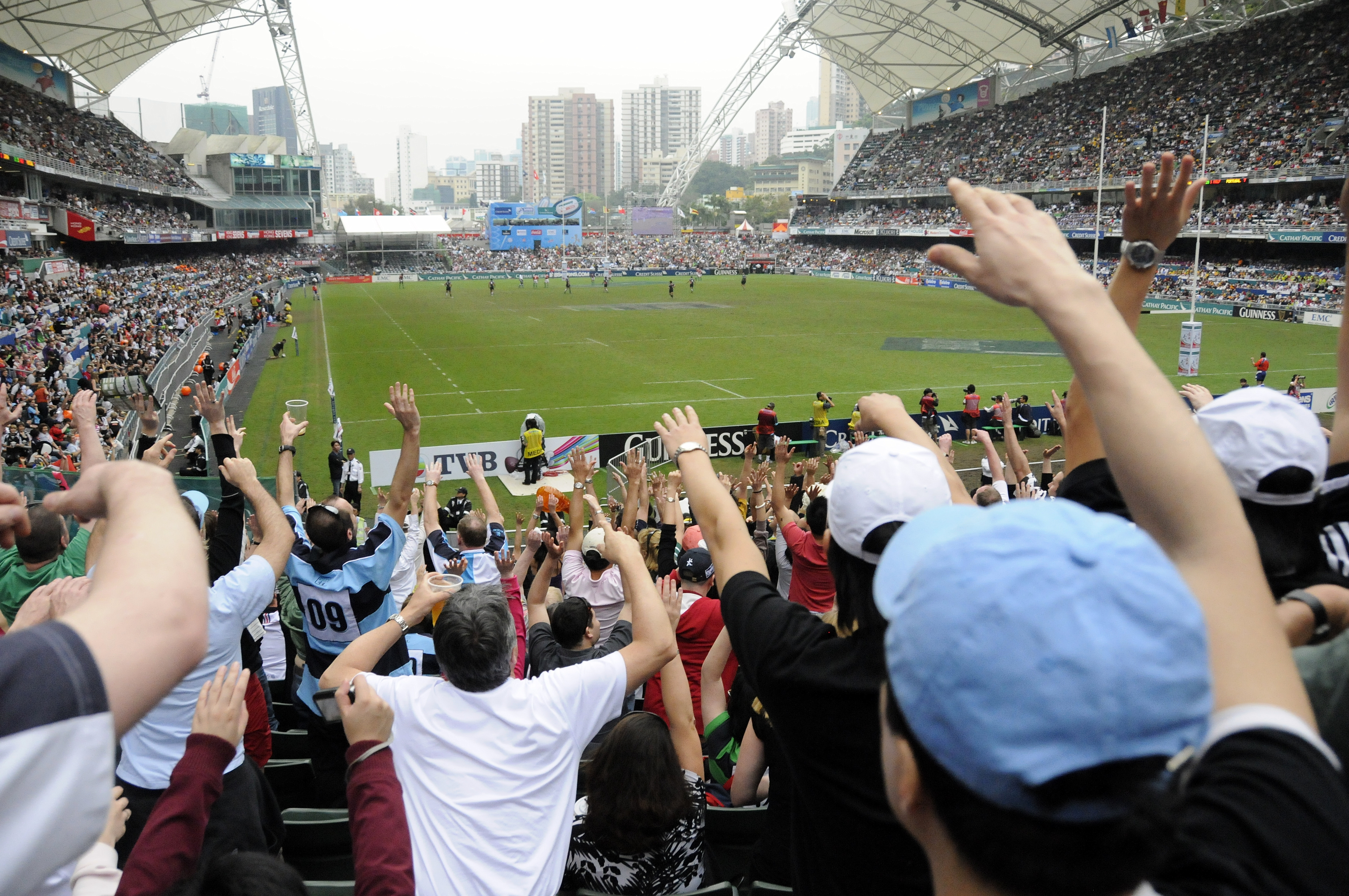
Crowd at the 2009 Hong Kong Sevens

- Anitelea Aiolupo
- Lome Fa'atau
- Fa'atonu Fili
- Malaki Iupeli
- Danny Kaleopa
- Lolani Koko
- Junior Paramore
- Afato So'oalo
- Steven So'oialo
- Filipo Toala
- Sila Vaifale
- Alefaio Vaisuai

=== Player records ===
The following table shows Samoa's statistical career leaders in the World Rugby Sevens Series. Players in bold are still active. Mikaele Pesamino is Samoa's top try scorer in the World Rugby Sevens Series. He was the overall top try score in both the 2006–07 (43 tries) and the 2009–10 (56 tries) seasons.

Most tries
Rank	Player	Tries
1	Mikaele Pesamino	161
2	Uale Mai	142
3	Alafoti Faosiliva	127
4	Alatasi Tupou	96
5	**Samoa Toloa**	93

=== Award winners ===
The following Samoa Sevens players have been recognised at the World Rugby Awards since 2004:

World Rugby Men's 7s Player of the Year
Year	Nominees	Winners
2006	Uale Mai	**Uale Mai**
2007	Mikaele Pesamino	—
2008	Uale Mai (2)	—
2010	Alafoti Fa'osiliva	**Mikaele Pesamino**
2010	Lolo Lui	**Mikaele Pesamino**
2010	Mikaele Pesamino (2)	**Mikaele Pesamino**

== Coaches ==
The current coach is Brian Lima, former player of the Samoa national rugby sevens team.

Past coaches include:

- Lilomaiava Taufusi Salesa coached the 1993 Hong Kong Sevens winning team.
- Fuimaono Titimaea "Dicky" Tafua coached the team on the 2005-2006 IRB Sevens Circuit where they qualified to two finals ( the London Sevens, where they lost to South Africa, and the Paris Sevens where they lost to Fiji). Fuimaono resigned from coaching in 2007 to his new post as Secretary to Samoa's Head of State, Tupua Tamasese Tufuga Efi.
- Damian McGrath won a Cup in Paris was sacked by the SRU controversially.
- Galumalemana Rudolph Moors took over as coach, but after a disappointing team performance in the 2008–09 Series he was temporarily replaced by Lilomaiava Taufusi Salesa for the final two legs of the series.
- Stephen Betham was named as Moors' successor in 2009.

=== Former coaches ===
- Lilomaiava Taufusi Salesa – led the 1993 Hong Kong Sevens winners.
- Sir Gordon Tietjens (2016–2020).
- Brian Lima (c. 2019/20–August 2024).
- Matamua Upati Junior Salima (appointed for Oceania Sevens, Nov 2024).

== Other statistics ==
Year	Host	Cup Final			Plate Final		
Year	Host	Winner	Score	Runner-up	Winner	Score	Runner-up
2009; Details	Dubai Exiles Rugby Ground	New Zealand	24-12	Samoa	Australia	7-0	South Africa
2008; Details	Dubai Exiles Rugby Ground	South Africa	19-12	England	Samoa	12-7	Kenya
2004; Details	Dubai Exiles Rugby Ground	England	26 - 21	Fiji	Samoa	21 - 19	Argentina

Year	Venue	Cup			Plate		
Year	Venue	Winner	Final score	Runner-up	Winner	Final score	Runner-up
2010; Details	Westpac Stadium	Fiji	19-14	Samoa	Australia	26-22	South Africa
2008; Details	Westpac Stadium	New Zealand	22-7	Samoa	South Africa	19-12	Wales

Year	Venue	Cup			Plate		
Year	Venue	Winner	Final score	Runner-up	Winner	Final score	Runner-up
2007; Details	Petco Park	Fiji	38 - 24	Samoa	South Africa	28 - 19	Scotland

Year	Venue	Cup			Plate		
Year	Venue	Winner	Final score	Runner-up	Winner	Final score	Runner-up
2005; Details	Outeniqua Park	Fiji	21 - 19	Argentina	Samoa	17 - 5	New Zealand

Year	Venue	Cup			Plate		
Year	Venue	Winner	Final score	Runner-up	Winner	Final score	Runner-up
2007; Details	Adelaide Oval	Fiji	21-7	Samoa	Australia	31-0	South Africa

Year	Venue	Cup			Plate		
Year	Venue	Winner	Final score	Runner-up	Winner	Final score	Runner-up
2007; Details	Murrayfield	New Zealand	34-5	Samoa	Fiji	31-7	Kenya

Year	Venue	Cup			Plate		
Year	Venue	Winner	Final score	Runner-up	Winner	Final score	Runner-up
2006; Details	Stade Jean-Bouin	South Africa	33-12	Samoa	Fiji	31-12	Argentina

Year	Venue	Cup			Plate		
Year	Venue	Winner	Final score	Runner-up	Winner	Final score	Runner-up
2006; Details	National Stadium, Singapore	Fiji	40-21	England	Samoa	26-5	France

Year	Venue	Cup			Plate		
Year	Venue	Winner	Final score	Runner-up	Winner	Final score	Runner-up
2006; Details	Twickenham	Fiji	54-14	Samoa	South Africa	42-7	Kenya

Year	Venue	Cup			Plate		
Year	Venue	Winner	Final score	Runner-up	Winner	Final score	Runner-up
1998; Details	Hong Kong Stadium	Fiji	28-19	Western Samoa	South Korea	40–14	Papua New Guinea

Year	Venue	Cup			Plate		
Year	Venue	Winner	Final score	Runner-up	Winner	Final score	Runner-up
1979; Details	HK Football Club Stadium	Australia	39-3	Western Samoa	Papua New Guinea	13-10	Hawaii

== See also ==
- Samoa national rugby union team
- Rugby union in Samoa
