= 2010 Wellington Sevens =

The Emirates Airline Wellington Sevens is played annually as part of the IRB Sevens World Series for international rugby sevens (seven-a-side version of rugby union). The 2010 competition, took place on 4 February and 5 February the third of eight Cup tournaments in the 2009–10 IRB Sevens World Series. Fiji won the tournament, its first title of the season, with a victory over Samoa in the final.

== Teams ==
- Argentina
- Australia
- Canada
- England
- Fiji
- France
- Kenya
- New Zealand
- Niue
- Papua New Guinea
- Samoa
- Scotland
- South Africa
- Tonga
- United States
- Wales

== Pool Stages ==
=== Pool A ===
Team	Pld	W	D	L	PF	PA	+/-	Pts
New Zealand	3	3	0	0	97	17	80	9
South Africa	3	2	0	1	83	34	49	7
Wales	3	1	0	2	36	79	−43	5
Niue	3	0	0	3	27	113	−86	3

Date	Team 1	Score	Team 2
2010-02-05	New Zealand	29 – 5	Wales
2010-02-05	South Africa	38 – 10	Niue
2010-02-05	New Zealand	49 – 5	Niue
2010-02-05	South Africa	38 – 5	Wales
2010-02-05	Wales	26 – 12	Niue
2010-02-05	New Zealand	19 – 7	South Africa

=== Pool B ===
Team	Pld	W	D	L	PF	PA	+/-	Pts
Fiji	3	3	0	0	115	12	103	9
Australia	3	2	0	1	62	57	5	7
Scotland	3	1	0	2	46	65	−19	5
Papua New Guinea	3	0	0	3	17	106	−89	3

Date	Team 1	Score	Team 2
2010-02-05	Fiji	36 – 5	Scotland
2010-02-05	Australia	31 – 12	Papua New Guinea
2010-02-05	Fiji	41 – 0	Papua New Guinea
2010-02-05	Australia	24 – 7	Scotland
2010-02-05	Scotland	34 – 5	Papua New Guinea
2010-02-05	Fiji	38 – 7	Australia

=== Pool C ===
Team	Pld	W	D	L	PF	PA	+/-	Pts
England	3	3	0	0	79	36	43	9
Kenya	3	2	0	1	49	38	11	7
United States	3	1	0	2	29	62	−33	5
Tonga	3	0	0	3	33	54	−21	3

Date	Team 1	Score	Team 2
2010-02-05	England	31 – 7	United States
2010-02-05	Kenya	15 – 7	Tonga
2010-02-05	England	24 – 19	Tonga
2010-02-05	Kenya	24 – 7	United States
2010-02-05	United States	15 – 7	Tonga
2010-02-05	England	24 – 10	Kenya

=== Pool D ===
Team	Pld	W	D	L	PF	PA	+/-	Pts
Samoa	3	3	0	0	91	47	44	9
Canada	3	2	0	1	61	53	8	7
Argentina	3	1	0	2	40	64	−24	5
France	3	0	0	3	43	71	−28	3

Date	Team 1	Score	Team 2
2010-02-05	Samoa	31 – 19	France
2010-02-05	Canada	26 – 7	Argentina
2010-02-05	Samoa	27 – 14	Canada
2010-02-05	Argentina	19 – 5	France
2010-02-05	Canada	21 – 19	France
2010-02-05	Samoa	33 – 14	Argentina

== Knockout ==
=== Shield ===
Quarter-finals
6 February – Wellington, New Zealand
Wales	31
Papua New Guinea	12
6 February – Wellington, New Zealand
Argentina	17
Tonga	7
6 February – Wellington, New Zealand
United States	10
France	21
6 February – Wellington, New Zealand
Scotland	12
Niue	17

Semi-finals
6 February – Wellington, New Zealand
Papua New Guinea	10
Tonga	26
6 February – Wellington, New Zealand
United States	19
Scotland	12

Final
6 February – Wellington, New Zealand
Tonga	14
United States	19

=== Bowl ===
Quarter-finals
6 February – Wellington, New Zealand
Wales	31
Papua New Guinea	12
6 February – Wellington, New Zealand
Argentina	17
Tonga	7
6 February – Wellington, New Zealand
United States	10
France	21
6 February – Wellington, New Zealand
Scotland	12
Niue	17

Semi-finals
6 February – Wellington, New Zealand
Wales	17
Argentina	12
6 February – Wellington, New Zealand
France	28
Niue	12

Final
6 February – Wellington, New Zealand
Wales	7
France	5

=== Plate ===
Quarter-finals
6 February – Wellington, New Zealand
New Zealand	24
Australia	12
6 February – Wellington, New Zealand
Samoa	14
Kenya	12
6 February – Wellington, New Zealand
England	31
Canada	0
6 February – Wellington, New Zealand
Fiji	21
South Africa	5

Semi-finals
6 February – Wellington, New Zealand
Australia	26
Kenya	17
6 February – Wellington, New Zealand
Canada	5
South Africa	29

Final
6 February – Wellington, New Zealand
Australia	26
South Africa	22

=== Cup ===
Quarter-finals
6 February – Wellington, New Zealand
New Zealand	24
Australia	12
6 February – Wellington, New Zealand
Samoa	14
Kenya	12
6 February – Wellington, New Zealand
England	31
Canada	0
6 February – Wellington, New Zealand
Fiji	21
South Africa	5

Semi-finals
6 February – Wellington, New Zealand
New Zealand	14
Samoa	24
6 February – Wellington, New Zealand
England	19
Fiji	28

Final
6 February – Wellington, New Zealand
Samoa	14
Fiji	19

== Statistics ==
=== Individual points ===
Individual Points
Pos.	Player	Country	Points
1	William Ryder	Fiji	45
2	Siaosi Iongi	Tonga	44
2	Ben Gollings	England	44
4	James Stannard	Australia	41
5	Osea Kolinisau	Fiji	37
6	Mikaele Pesamino	Samoa	35
7	Lolo Lui	Samoa	34
8	Paul Albaladejo	France	32
9	Nese Malifa	United States	30
9	Renaud Delmas	France	30
9	Mat Turner	England	30

=== Individual tries ===
Individual Tries
Pos.	Player	Country	Tries
1	Osea Kolinisau	Fiji	7
1	Mikaele Pesamino	Samoa	7
3	Renaud Delmas	France	6
3	Siaosi Iogni	Tonga	6
3	Mat Turner	England	6
6	Rayno Benjamin	South Africa	5
6	Seremaia Burotu	Fiji	5
6	Ifan Evans	Wales	5
6	Collins Injera	Kenya	5
6	Reupena Levasa	Samoa	5
6	Uale Mai	Samoa	5
6	Tim Mikkelson	New Zealand	5
6	William Ryder	Fiji	5

Preceded by South Africa Sevens	Wellington Sevens; 2010	Succeeded by USA Sevens
