= 2009 South Africa Sevens =

The South Africa Sevens is played annually as part of the IRB Sevens World Series for international rugby sevens. The 2009 competition took place on 11 December and 12 December at Outeniqua Park in George, Western Cape, the second of eight Cup events at the 2009–10 IRB Sevens World Series. New Zealand won its second consecutive title by defeating Fiji in the final.

== Format ==
The tournament consists of four round-robin pools of four teams. All sixteen teams progress to the knockout stage. The top two teams from each group progress to quarter-finals in the main competition, with the winners of those quarter-finals competing in cup semi-finals and the losers competing in plate semi-finals. The bottom two teams from each group progress to quarter-finals in the consolation competition, with the winners of those quarter-finals competing in bowl semi-finals and the losers competing in shield semi-finals.

== Teams ==
- Argentina
- Australia
- England
- Fiji
- France
- Kenya
- New Zealand
- Portugal
- Russia
- Samoa
- Scotland
- South Africa
- Tunisia
- United States
- Wales
- Zimbabwe

== Pool stages ==
=== Pool A ===
Team	Pld	W	D	L	PF	PA	+/-	Pts
Kenya	3	2	1	0	95	19	76	8
South Africa	3	2	1	0	79	31	48	8
Zimbabwe	3	1	0	2	36	84	-48	5
France	3	0	0	3	26	102	-76	3

Date	Team 1	Score	Team 2
2009-12-11	South Africa	38–14	France
2009-12-11	Kenya	50–0	Zimbabwe
2009-12-11	South Africa	29–5	Zimbabwe
2009-12-11	Kenya	33–7	France
2009-12-11	France	5–31	Zimbabwe
2009-12-11	South Africa	12–12	Kenya

=== Pool B ===
Team	Pld	W	D	L	PF	PA	+/-	Pts
Fiji	3	3	0	0	112	19	93	9
Australia	3	1	1	1	35	50	-15	6
Portugal	3	1	0	2	33	83	-50	5
Russia	3	0	1	2	38	66	-28	4

Date	Team 1	Score	Team 2
2009-12-11	Fiji	50–7	Portugal
2009-12-11	Australia	14–14	Russia
2009-12-11	Fiji	31–12	Russia
2009-12-11	Australia	21–5	Portugal
2009-12-11	Portugal	21–12	Russia
2009-12-11	Fiji	31–0	Australia

=== Pool C ===
Team	Pld	W	D	L	PF	PA	+/-	Pts
Samoa	3	3	0	0	60	29	31	9
New Zealand	3	2	0	1	96	34	62	7
Wales	3	1	0	2	25	55	-30	5
United States	3	0	0	3	19	82	-63	3

Date	Team 1	Score	Team 2
2009-12-11	New Zealand	22–24	Samoa
2009-12-11	Wales	15–12	United States
2009-12-11	New Zealand	57–0	United States
2009-12-11	Wales	0–26	Samoa
2009-12-11	Samoa	10–7	United States
2009-12-11	New Zealand	17–10	Wales

=== Pool D ===
Team	Pld	W	D	L	PF	PA	+/-	Pts
England	3	3	0	0	91	26	65	9
Argentina	3	2	0	1	65	22	43	7
Scotland	3	1	0	2	50	58	-8	5
Tunisia	3	0	0	3	14	114	-100	3

Date	Team 1	Score	Team 2
2009-12-11	Scotland	5–15	Argentina
2009-12-11	England	45–0	Tunisia
2009-12-11	Scotland	26–14	Tunisia
2009-12-11	England	17–7	Argentina
2009-12-11	Argentina	43–0	Tunisia
2009-12-11	Scotland	19–29	England

== Knockout ==
=== Shield ===
Quarter-finals
12 December – Outeniqua Park
Zimbabwe	17
Russia	22
12 December – Outeniqua Park
Scotland	10
United States	21
12 December – Outeniqua Park
Wales	33
Tunisia	0
12 December – Outeniqua Park
Portugal	28
France	17

Semi-finals
12 December – Outeniqua Park
Zimbabwe	12
Scotland	35
12 December – Outeniqua Park
Tunisia	21
France	26

Final
12 December – Outeniqua Park
Scotland	28
France	19

=== Bowl ===
Quarter-finals
12 December – Outeniqua Park
Zimbabwe	17
Russia	22
12 December – Outeniqua Park
Scotland	10
United States	21
12 December – Outeniqua Park
Wales	33
Tunisia	0
12 December – Outeniqua Park
Portugal	28
France	17

Semi-finals
12 December – Outeniqua Park
Russia	24
United States	5
12 December – Outeniqua Park
Wales	24
Portugal	7

Final
12 December – Outeniqua Park
Russia	5
Wales	14

=== Plate ===
Quarter-finals
12 December – Outeniqua Park
Kenya	24
Australia	12
12 December – Outeniqua Park
England	19
New Zealand	22
12 December – Outeniqua Park
Samoa	19
Argentina	26
12 December – Outeniqua Park
Fiji	21
South Africa	17

Semi-finals
12 December – Outeniqua Park
Australia	5
England	24
12 December – Outeniqua Park
Samoa	7
South Africa	10

Final
12 December – Outeniqua Park
England	21
South Africa	7

=== Cup ===
Quarter-finals
12 December – Outeniqua Park
Kenya	24
Australia	12
12 December – Outeniqua Park
England	19
New Zealand	22
12 December – Outeniqua Park
Samoa	19
Argentina	26
12 December – Outeniqua Park
Fiji	21
South Africa	17

Semi-finals
12 December – Outeniqua Park
Kenya	14
New Zealand	17
12 December – Outeniqua Park
Argentina	14
Fiji	19

Final
12 December – Outeniqua Park
New Zealand	21
Fiji	12

== Statistics ==
=== Individual points ===
Individual Points
Pos.	Player	Country	Points
1	William Ryder	Fiji	67
2	Ben Gollings	England	55
3	Mike Adamson	Scotland	53
4	Lavin Asego	Kenya	38
5	Mzwandile Stick	South Africa	36
6	Christian Wade	England	35
7	Joaquin Todeschini	Argentina	33
8	Sherwin Stowers	New Zealand	32
9	Collins Injera	Kenya	30
10	Diogo Miranda	Portugal	28

=== Individual tries ===
Individual Tries
Pos.	Player	Country	Tries
1	William Ryder	Fiji	7
2	Christian Wade	England	7
3	Collins Injera	Kenya	6
4	Sherwin Stowers	New Zealand	6
5	Mike Adamson	Scotland	5
6	Renauld Delmas	France	5
7	Ben Gollings	England	5
8	Zar Lawrence	New Zealand	5
9	Andrew Turnbull	Scotland	5
10	Cecil Afrika	South Africa	4

Preceded by Dubai Sevens	George Sevens; 2009	Succeeded by Wellington Sevens
