= Peter Schuster =

Peter Schuster may refer to:

- Peter Schuster (rugby union) (born c. 1952), Samoan former rugby union player and coach
- Peter Schuster (theoretical chemist) (1941–2026), Austrian theoretical chemist
