= 2010 Adelaide Sevens =

- IRB Sevens XI
- Host nation: Australia
- Date: 19–21 March 2010

Cup
- Champion: Samoa
- Runner-up: United States

Plate
- Winner: New Zealand
- Runner-up: South Africa

Bowl
- Winner: England
- Runner-up: Kenya

Shield
- Winner: Japan
- Runner-up: Tonga

The 2010 Adelaide Sevens, promoted as the International Rugby Sevens Adelaide 2010, was a rugby sevens tournament that was part of the IRB Sevens World Series in the 2009–10 season. It was the Australian Sevens leg of the series, held between 19 and 21 March at the Adelaide Oval in South Australia.

Samoa picked up their second consecutive Cup win, following on from their victory in the USA Sevens. In a major surprise, their opponent in the final was the United States, who advanced to their first-ever Cup final. Samoa's 38–10 win enabled them to narrow the gap behind series leaders New Zealand to only 2 points.

New Zealand, who were knocked out of the Cup competition by Samoa, gained the consolation prize of the Plate, defeating reigning series champions South Africa in the final. The Bowl was won by England and the Shield by Japan.

== Format ==
The teams were drawn into four pools of four teams each. Each team played the other teams in their pool once, with 3 points awarded for a win, 2 points for a draw, and 1 point for a loss (no points awarded for a forfeit). The top two teams from each group progressed to quarter-finals in the main competition, with the winners of those quarter-finals competing in cup semi-finals and the losers competing in plate semi-finals. The bottom two teams from each group progressed to quarter-finals in the consolation competition, with the winners of those quarter-finals competing in bowl semi-finals and the losers competing in shield semi-finals.

== Teams ==
The participating teams were:

- Argentina
- Australia
- England
- France
- Fiji
- Japan
- Kenya
- New Zealand
- Niue
- Papua New Guinea
- Samoa
- Scotland
- Tonga
- South Africa
- United States
- Wales

== Pool stage ==
The tournament started on the Friday night and Saturday with matches between teams in the same pool on a round robin basis. The following is a list of the recorded results.

=== Pool A ===
Team	Pld	W	D	L	PF	PA	+/-	Pts
New Zealand	3	3	0	0	104	7	+97	9
Argentina	3	2	0	1	40	71	-31	7
Tonga	3	1	0	2	39	52	-10	5
Scotland	3	0	0	3	14	67	-53	3

Date	Team 1	Score	Team 2
2010-03-19	New Zealand	31–0	Scotland
2010-03-19	Argentina	19–17	Tonga
2010-03-20	New Zealand	26–0	Tonga
2010-03-20	Argentina	14–7	Scotland
2010-03-20	Scotland	7–22	Tonga
2010-03-20	New Zealand	47–7	Argentina

=== Pool B ===
Team	Pld	W	D	L	PF	PA	+/-	Pts
South Africa	3	2	1	0	90	12	+78	8
Samoa	3	2	1	0	99	29	+70	8
Japan	3	1	0	2	26	109	-83	5
France	3	0	0	3	27	92	-65	3

Date	Team 1	Score	Team 2
2010-03-19	Samoa	33–12	France
2010-03-19	South Africa	40–0	Japan
2010-03-20	Samoa	54–5	Japan
2010-03-20	South Africa	38–0	France
2010-03-20	France	15–21	Japan
2010-03-20	Samoa	12–12	South Africa

=== Pool C ===
Team	Pld	W	D	L	PF	PA	+/-	Pts
Wales	3	2	0	1	89	36	+50	7
Fiji	3	2	0	1	74	24	+50	7
Kenya	3	2	0	1	53	33	+20	7
Papua New Guinea	3	0	0	3	12	132	-120	3

Date	Team 1	Score	Team 2
2010-03-19	Fiji	12–17	Wales
2010-03-19	Kenya	27–7	Papua New Guinea
2010-03-20	Fiji	41–0	Papua New Guinea
2010-03-20	Kenya	19–5	Wales
2010-03-20	Wales	64–5	Papua New Guinea
2010-03-20	Fiji	21–7	Kenya

=== Pool D ===
Team	Pld	W	D	L	PF	PA	+/-	Pts
Australia	3	3	0	0	93	17	+76	9
United States	3	2	0	1	53	64	–11	7
England	3	1	0	2	71	41	+30	5
Niue	3	0	0	3	12	107	–95	3

Date	Team 1	Score	Team 2
2010-03-19	England	21–24	United States
2010-03-19	Australia	40–5	Niue
2010-03-20	England	38–0	Niue
2010-03-20	Australia	36–0	United States
2010-03-20	United States	29–7	Niue
2010-03-20	England	12–17	Australia

== Knockout ==
Play on the last day of the tournament consisted of finals matches for the Bowl, Plate, and Cup competitions. The following is a list of the recorded results.

=== Shield ===
Quarter-finals
21 March - Adelaide, Australia
Tonga	0
France	38
21 March - Adelaide, Australia
England	47
Papua New Guinea	0
21 March - Adelaide, Australia
Kenya	25
Niue	7
21 March - Adelaide, Australia
Japan	15
Scotland	21

Semi-finals
21 March - Adelaide, Australia
Tonga	45
Papua New Guinea	0
21 March - Adelaide, Australia
Niue	5
Japan	22

Final
21 March - Adelaide, Australia
Tonga	19
Japan	22

=== Bowl ===
Quarter-finals
21 March - Adelaide, Australia
Tonga	0
France	38
21 March - Adelaide, Australia
England	47
Papua New Guinea	0
21 March - Adelaide, Australia
Kenya	25
Niue	7
21 March - Adelaide, Australia
Japan	15
Scotland	21

Semi-finals
21 March - Adelaide, Australia
France	0
England	19
21 March - Adelaide, Australia
Kenya	36
Scotland	12

Final
21 March - Adelaide, Australia
England	33
Kenya	12

=== Plate ===
Quarter-finals
21 March - Adelaide, Australia
New Zealand	19
Samoa	24
21 March - Adelaide, Australia
Australia	26
Fiji	22
21 March - Adelaide, Australia
Wales	10
United States	12
21 March - Adelaide, Australia
South Africa	14
Argentina	17

Semi-finals
21 March - Adelaide, Australia
New Zealand	24
Fiji	21
21 March - Adelaide, Australia
Wales	0
South Africa	29

Final
21 March - Adelaide, Australia
New Zealand	21
South Africa	14

=== Cup ===
Quarter-finals
21 March - Adelaide, Australia
New Zealand	19
Samoa	24
21 March - Adelaide, Australia
Australia	26
Fiji	22
21 March - Adelaide, Australia
Wales	10
United States	12
21 March - Adelaide, Australia
South Africa	14
Argentina	17

Semi-finals
21 March - Adelaide, Australia
Samoa	26
Australia	12
21 March - Adelaide, Australia
United States	28
Argentina	12

Final
21 March - Adelaide, Australia
Samoa	38
United States	10

== Statistics ==
=== Individual points ===
Individual Points
Pos.	Player	Country	Points
1	Ben Gollings	England	60
2	Mikaele Pesamino	Samoa	57
3	Sampie Mastriet	South Africa	45
4	Tomasi Cama	New Zealand	40
5	Lolo Lui	Samoa	39
6	Cecil Afrika	South Africa	38
7	James Stannard	Australia	34
8	Fautua Otto	Samoa	32
9	Innocent Simiyu	Kenya	30
9	Diego Palma	Argentina	30

=== Individual tries ===
Individual Tries
Pos.	Player	Country	Tries
1	Mikaele Pesamino	Samoa	11
2	Sampie Mastriet	South Africa	9
3	Fautua Otto	Samoa	6
3	Diego Palma	Argentina	6
3	Innocent Simiyu	Kenya	6
6	Brackin Karauria-Henry	Australia	5
6	Humphrey Kayange	Kenya	5
6	Sake Tokula	New Zealand	5
6	Collins Injera	Kenya	5
6	Alisi Tupuailei	Japan	5
6	Koji Wada	Japan	5

== Reference list ==
Preceded by USA Sevens	Adelaide Sevens; 2010	Succeeded by Hong Kong Sevens
