= Marist St. Joseph =

Samoan rugby union club, based in Apia

(Samoa) Marist St. Joseph
- Full name: Marist St. Joseph Sports Club
- Union: SRU
- Founded: 1970
- Ground: Marist Stadium (Capacity: ~4000)
Team kit

Official website
- sevens.maristsamoa.com/web/

Marist St. Joseph Sports Club is Samoan rugby union club from Apia. They play in green and white hooped jerseys and enjoy widespread support in Samoa.

== History ==
=== Early years ===
Before 1970, having two Marist Brothers' rugby clubs was not feasible in a small country such as Samoa. which were Marist Rugby Club, from Mulivai, Apia and St. Joseph's Rugby Club from Lotopa, founded in the 1960s by Casimir Foley as a team for the players who left Marist Rugby Club.

=== The merger ===
In 1970, Marist Rugby Club, who was facing relegation along with Moaula Rugby Club, had to win to avoid relegation. St. Joseph's deliberately lost in the final in order to avoid being relegated, which caused controversy at the time. As such, the management of the two clubs decided in order to strengthen Marist rugby. The merged club was named Marist Rugby Football Club, the St. Joseph was added to the club name in order to entice the former St. Joseph's College players to play for the newly created club rather than playing for their village teams. John Maihi and Brother Clement were appointed as coaches. Its first clubhouse, in Alafua, where currently is located Don Bosco technical school.

The inaugural Marist St.Joseph was composed by players such as Felise Vito, Aki Ripley, Iafeta Ekeroma, Ioane Sinuki Melei, George Meredith, Jimmy Fruean, Ricky McFall, Peter Schuster, Lino Passi, Norman McDonald, Toetu Palamo, Mefi Palamo, Rudy David, Gordan Bartley, Steve Stanley, Herbert Clarke (Manager), Petelo Lepou, Eneliko Ah Voo, Jeffrey Atoa, Henry Penn, Maligi Sefo and Maluelue Tafua. Most of them, later represented Samoa internationally.

=== After the merger ===
In 1983, Marist St.Joseph was incorporated under the Incorporated Societies Ordinance Act 1952, following a decision from Marist St. Joseph's management to become independent and split from the Marist Old Boys Association after the 1982 first tour of New Zealand, during the Muldoon government in New Zealand, which declared that all the New Zealanders of Samoan descent and the Samoans resident in New Zealand at the time were entitled to become New Zealand citizens. Upon returning from the tour, Marist St. Joseph members registered their club as sports body with a constitution in order to govern and promote sports and the club's objectives. From the aforementioned tour, John Schuster gained an opportunity to play for Marist St Pats and for the All Blacks

Since its inception, Marist St. Joseph won many accolades nationally and overseas. The club hosts the Vailima Marist International Sevens Rugby Tournament for 27 years, which helped to raise rugby sevens' profile in Samoa and attracted famous players from abroad such as Michael Jones, Viliami Ofahengaue, Waisale Serevi, John Kirwan, Terry Wright.

== Notable players ==
=== Samoa internationals ===
- Brian Lima
- Mathew Vaea
- Freddie Tuilagi
- Henry Tuilagi
- Alesana Tuilagi
- Anitelea Tuilagi
- Vavae Tuilagi
- Afato So'oalo
- Semo Sititi
- Leamy Toleafoa
- Kalolo Toleafoa
- Aleki Toleafoa
- Laulala Langkilde
- Lalovi Langkilde
- Michael Toleafoa
- Sila Vaifale
- George Stowers
- Lio Falaniko
- Su'a Peter Schuster
- Etuale Sefo
- Malaki Iupeli
- Mefi Palamo
- Toetu Palamo
- Arona Palamo
- Niko Palamo
- Ulia Ulia
- Henry Williams
- Afa Aiono
- Ofisa Treviranus
- Uale Mai
- Faatoina Autagavaia
- Maurie Fa'asavalu
- David Schuster
- David Sio
- George Meredith
- Peter Fatialofa
- Romeo Ah Chong
- Titimaea Tafua
- Faamaoni Lalomilo
- Rudolf Moors
- Stephen Betham

Tovio Petelo

=== Others ===
- (New Zealand) John Schuster
- (New Zealand) Sosene Anesi
- (New Zealand) Nepo Laulala

Several personalities such as the current Prime Minister of Samoa and CEO of Samoa Rugby Union Tuilaepa Aiono Sailele Malielegaoi, the first Samoan magistrate Su'a Fritz Thomsen, the first Prime Minister of Samoa Mata'afa Mulinu'u II, Member of Parliament Lefau Harry Schuster, also played for Marist St. Joseph.
