= Alafoti Fa'osiliva =

Samoa international rugby union player

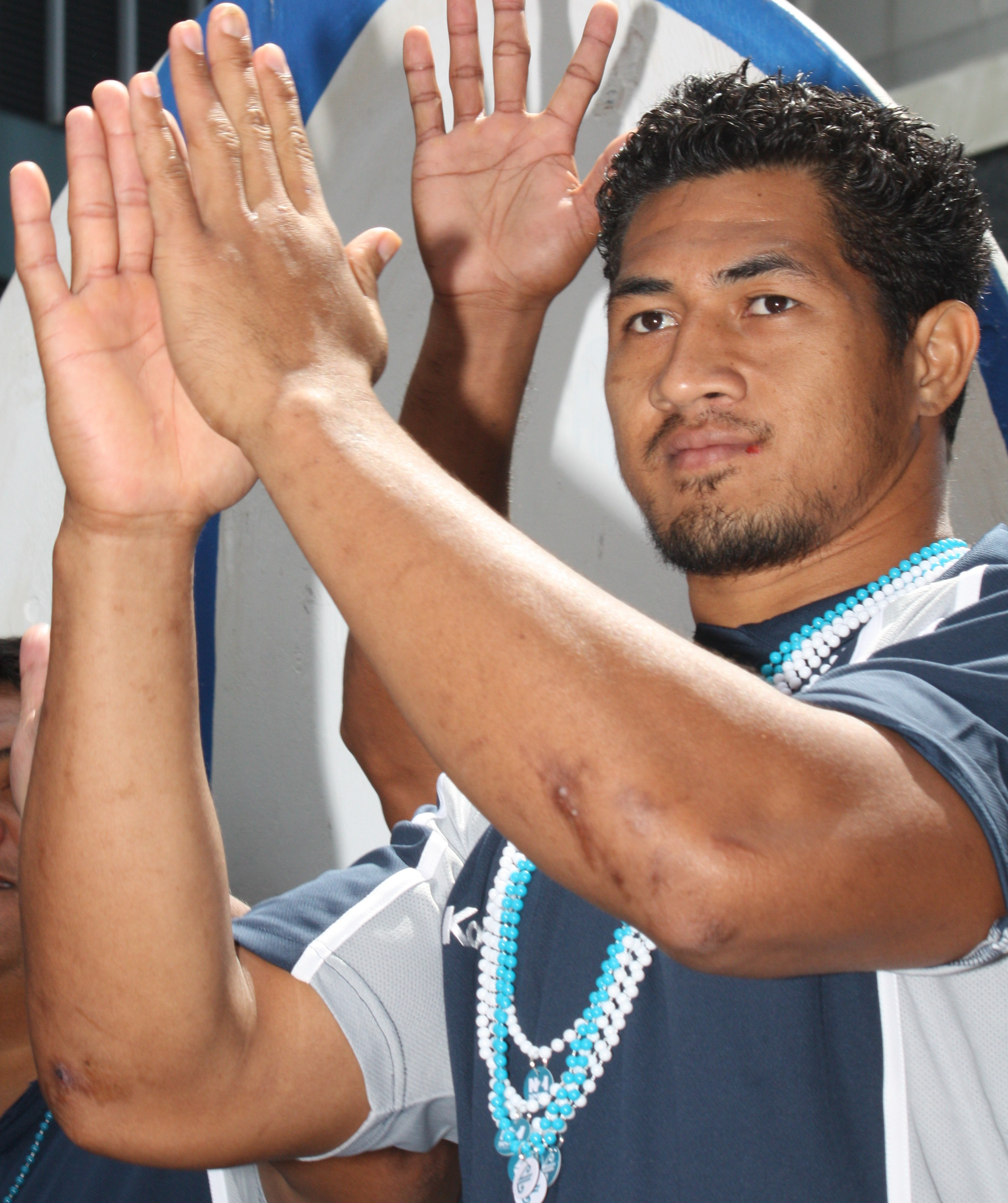
- Born: Alafoti Fa'osiliva; 28 October 1985 (age 41)
- Height: 1.87 m (6 ft 2 in)
- Weight: 128 kg (20 st 2 lb; 282 lb)
- Notable relative: married to Layla Faosiliva

Rugby union career
- Position: Back Row
- Current team: Chippenham RFC
Senior career
Years	Team	Apps	(Points)
2011–2012	Toulon	4	(5)
2012–2013	Bristol Bears	11	(20)
2013–2016	Bath	36	(25)
2016–	Worcester Warriors	26	(15)
2021–	Chippenham RFC	43	(70)
- Correct as of 12 August 2015
International career
Years	Team	Apps	(Points)
2006–	Samoa	23	(25)
- Correct as of 23 June 2017
National sevens team
Years	Team		Comps
2009-	Samoa		

Alafoti Fa'osiliva (born 28 October 1985) is a rugby union player for English club Worcester Warriors in the Aviva Premiership and in the national Samoa team.

== Early life ==
Fa'osiliva grew up in the village of Afega, situated on the central north coast of Upolu island. He attended the local Sagaga Primary School followed by neighbouring Leulumoega College. In 2004, at the age of 19, he was selected for the Samoa Under 21 team. He also plays for the national Samoa national rugby union team.

== Club career ==
Faosiliva joined Bristol in the summer of 2012. He made his first start in the RFU Championship game against London Scottish on 29 November 2012 at the Memorial Stadium.

After leaving Bristol, Fa'osiliva joined Bath Rugby in the Aviva Premiership for the 2013/14 season. On 13 May 2016, it was confirmed he had been released from Bath due to a recent guilty plea for assault and consequent suspended custodial sentence.

On 2 August 2016, Faosiliva signed for local rivals Worcester Warriors from the 2016–17 season, following his release from Bath. This was followed by a move to Championship club Bedford Blues in the 19–20 season. He is now lead player coach at Chippenham RFC.

== International career ==
Fa’osiliva was part of the Samoa national rugby sevens team that won the 2009–10 IRB Sevens World Series. He was nominated for the 2010 IRB International Sevens Player of the Year alongside team captains Lolo Lui and Mikaele Pesamino. He represented the Samoa 15s team during the 2015 Rugby World Cup.
