= 2010 Hong Kong Sevens =

Rugby union sevens tournament

- Host nation: Hong Kong
- Date: March 26–28, 2010

Cup
- Champion: Samoa
- Runner-up: New Zealand

Plate
- Winner: Australia
- Runner-up: South Africa

Bowl
- Winner: Canada
- Runner-up: Wales

Shield
- Winner: Hong Kong
- Runner-up: Russia

Tournament details
- Most points: (New Zealand) Kurt Baker (61)
- Most tries: (New Zealand) Kurt Baker (9)

The 2010 Hong Kong Sevens is a rugby union sevens tournament, part of the 2009–10 IRB Sevens World Series. The competition was held from March 26–28 in at Hong Kong Stadium in Hong Kong and featured 24 teams. Samoa won its third consecutive Cup after defeating New Zealand in the final. With the victory, Samoa moved into first place in the World Series standings.

== Format ==
Qualification for the various trophy brackets is as follows:

- Cup and Plate — The six pool winners, plus the two top-rated second-place teams
- Bowl — The four remaining second-place teams, plus the four top-rated third-place teams
- Shield — The eight remaining teams

The 2010 edition saw several significant changes to the tournament format. Foremost among these changes was the introduction of the fourth-level Shield trophy, which had not previously been awarded in Hong Kong. More important within the context of the IRB Sevens as a whole, the Cup and Plate are now contested in the same manner as in other competitions, with the losing quarterfinalists in the Cup parachuting into the Plate semifinals.

== Teams ==
- Argentina
- Australia
- Canada
- China
- Chinese Taipei
- England
- Fiji
- France
- Hong Kong
- Italy
- Japan
- Kenya
- South Korea
- New Zealand
- Portugal
- Russia
- Samoa
- Scotland
- South Africa
- Thailand
- Tonga
- United States
- Wales
- Zimbabwe

== Incident ==
One spectator dressed in fancy costume invaded the pitch. He jumped down from the south stand, climbed onto the crossbar at the south end of the stadium for several minutes whilst hapless security guards watched; he dodged back into the stands and evaded capture.

== Pool stages ==
=== Pool A ===
Pos	Team	Pld	W	D	L	PF	PA	PD	Pts
1	Samoa	3	3	0	0	85	38	+47	9
2	Argentina	3	2	0	1	75	33	+42	7
3	Italy	3	1	0	2	26	94	−68	5
4	Russia	3	0	0	3	36	57	−21	3

Date	Team 1	Score	Team 2
2010-03-26	Samoa	40 - 12	Italy
2010-03-26	Argentina	19 - 12	Russia
2010-03-27	Argentina	42 - 0	Italy
2010-03-27	Samoa	24 - 12	Russia
2010-03-27	Russia	12 - 14	Italy
2010-03-27	Samoa	21 - 14	Argentina

=== Pool B ===
Pos	Team	Pld	W	D	L	PF	PA	PD	Pts
1	New Zealand	3	3	0	0	117	10	+107	9
2	France	3	2	0	1	68	55	+13	7
3	Scotland	3	1	0	2	54	39	+15	5
4	Chinese Taipei	3	0	0	3	22	157	−135	3

Date	Team 1	Score	Team 2
2010-03-26	New Zealand	59 - 5	Chinese Taipei
2010-03-26	Scotland	7 - 12	France
2010-03-27	Scotland	42 - 5	Chinese Taipei
2010-03-27	New Zealand	36 - 0	France
2010-03-27	France	56 - 12	Chinese Taipei
2010-03-27	New Zealand	22 - 5	Scotland

=== Pool C ===
Pos	Team	Pld	W	D	L	PF	PA	PD	Pts
1	Fiji	3	3	0	0	165	26	+139	9
2	United States	3	2	0	1	91	48	+43	7
3	Portugal	3	1	0	2	67	62	+5	5
4	Thailand	3	0	0	3	7	194	−187	3

Date	Team 1	Score	Team 2
2010-03-26	Fiji	82 - 7	Thailand
2010-03-26	United States	17 - 10	Portugal
2010-03-27	United States	62 - 0	Thailand
2010-03-27	Fiji	45 - 7	Portugal
2010-03-27	Portugal	50 - 0	Thailand
2010-03-27	Fiji	38 - 12	United States

=== Pool D ===
Pos	Team	Pld	W	D	L	PF	PA	PD	Pts
1	Australia	3	3	0	0	114	36	+78	9
2	Canada	3	2	0	1	36	53	−17	7
3	Tonga	3	1	0	2	63	57	+6	5
4	China	3	0	0	3	31	98	−67	3

Date	Team 1	Score	Team 2
2010-03-26	Australia	45 - 12	China
2010-03-26	Canada	12 - 10	Tonga
2010-03-27	Canada	12 - 7	China
2010-03-27	Australia	33 - 12	Tonga
2010-03-27	Tonga	41 - 12	China
2010-03-27	Australia	36 - 12	Canada

=== Pool E ===
Pos	Team	Pld	W	D	L	PF	PA	PD	Pts
1	England	3	3	0	0	116	5	+111	9
2	Japan	3	1	0	2	50	64	−14	5
3	Wales	3	1	0	2	36	57	−21	5
4	Hong Kong	3	1	0	2	28	104	−76	5

Date	Team 1	Score	Team 2
2010-03-26	England	45 - 0	Hong Kong
2010-03-26	Wales	12 - 10	Japan
2010-03-27	Wales	19 - 21	Hong Kong
2010-03-27	England	45 - 0	Japan
2010-03-27	Japan	40 - 7	Hong Kong
2010-03-27	England	26 - 5	Wales

=== Pool F ===
Pos	Team	Pld	W	D	L	PF	PA	PD	Pts
1	South Africa	3	3	0	0	89	29	+60	9
2	Kenya	3	2	0	1	82	28	+54	7
3	Zimbabwe	3	1	0	2	46	76	−30	5
4	South Korea	3	0	0	3	38	122	−84	3

Date	Team 1	Score	Team 2
2010-03-26	South Africa	28 - 15	Zimbabwe
2010-03-26	Kenya	51 - 7	South Korea
2010-03-27	South Africa	40 - 7	South Korea
2010-03-27	Kenya	24 - 0	Zimbabwe
2010-03-27	Zimbabwe	31 - 24	South Korea
2010-03-27	Kenya	7 - 21	South Africa

== Knockout ==
=== Shield ===
Quarter-finals
March 28 - Hong Kong
Zimbabwe	43
Thailand	12
March 28 - Hong Kong
China	17
Russia	31
March 28 - Hong Kong
Hong Kong	31
South Korea	14
March 28 - Hong Kong
Chinese Taipei	12
Italy	45

Semi-finals
March 28 - Hong Kong
Zimbabwe	14
Russia	17
March 28 - Hong Kong
Hong Kong	26
Italy	19

Final
March 28 - Hong Kong
Russia	17
Hong Kong	19

=== Bowl ===
Quarter-finals
March 28 - Hong Kong
Argentina	12
Wales	17
March 28 - Hong Kong
Scotland	12
Japan	10
March 28 - Hong Kong
Canada	26
Tonga	0
March 28 - Hong Kong
Portugal	17
France	7

Semi-finals
March 28 - Hong Kong
Wales	26
Scotland	7
March 28 - Hong Kong
Canada	26
Portugal	24

Final
March 28 - Hong Kong
Wales	19
Canada	35

=== Plate ===
Quarter-finals
March 28 - Hong Kong
Samoa	24
United States	7
March 28 - Hong Kong
England	26
Australia	19
March 28 - Hong Kong
Fiji	14
South Africa	12
March 28 - Hong Kong
Kenya	12
New Zealand	21

Semi-finals
March 28 - Hong Kong
United States	12
Australia	21
March 28 - Hong Kong
South Africa	19
Kenya	12

Final
March 28 - Hong Kong
Australia	12
South Africa	5

=== Cup ===
Quarter-finals
March 28 - Hong Kong
Samoa	24
United States	7
March 28 - Hong Kong
England	26
Australia	19
March 28 - Hong Kong
Fiji	14
South Africa	12
March 28 - Hong Kong
Kenya	12
New Zealand	21

Semi-finals
March 28 - Hong Kong
Samoa	28
England	24
March 28 - Hong Kong
Fiji	28
New Zealand	33

Final
March 28 - Hong Kong
Samoa	24
New Zealand	21

South Africa was the third team to score 1,000 overall points after finishing on top of Group F

== Statistics ==
=== Individual points ===
Individual Points
Pos.	Player	Country	Points
1	Kurt Baker	New Zealand	61
2	Gardener Nechironga	Zimbabwe	48
3	James Stannard	Australia	44
4	Cecil Afrika	South Africa	41
5=	Mikaele Pesamino	Samoa	40
5=	Kevin Swiryn	United States	40
7=	Lolo Lui	Samoa	39
7=	Keith Robertson	Hong Kong	39
9	Philip Mack	Canada	38
10	Emosi Vucago	Fiji	37

=== Individual tries ===
Individual Tries
Pos.	Player	Country	Tries
1	Kurt Baker	New Zealand	9
2=	Gardener Nechironga	Zimbabwe	8
2=	Mikaele Pesamino	Samoa	8
2=	Kevin Swiryn	United States	8
5=	Goncalo Foro	Portugal	6
5=	Brackin Karauria-Henry	Australia	6
5=	Niumaia Rokobuli	Fiji	6
5=	Rowan Varty	Hong Kong	6
9=	Oliver Lindsay-Hague	England	5
9=	James Rodwell	England	5
9=	Nick Royle	England	5

Preceded by Adelaide Sevens	Hong Kong Sevens; 2010	Succeeded by London Sevens
