= 2010 USA Sevens =

- 2009–10 Sevens World Series
- Host nation: United States

Cup
- Champion: Samoa
- Runner-up: New Zealand

Plate
- Winner: South Africa

Bowl
- Winner: United States

Tournament details
- Matches played: 45
- Most points: (Samoa) M. Pesamino (55)
- Most tries: (Samoa) M. Pesamino (11)

The 2010 USA Sevens took place on February 13 and February 14 at Sam Boyd Stadium in Las Vegas, Nevada. It was the fourth Cup trophy in the 2009–10 IRB Sevens World Series. It was the first edition of the USA Sevens to be held in the Las Vegas area; the tournament had been hosted by the Los Angeles suburb of Carson, California from 2004 to 2006, and by San Diego from 2007 to 2009. The USA Sevens is played annually as part of the IRB Sevens World Series for international rugby sevens.

Samoa won the Cup final 33–12 over New Zealand. Samoa was led by Mikaele Pesamino, who scored 11 tries in the tournament, including two intercept tries against New Zealand in the final. The Plate went to defending series champion South Africa, the Bowl was won by the homestanding USA, and the Shield went to Scotland.

== Teams ==
- Argentina
- Australia
- Canada
- Chile
- England
- France
- Fiji
- Guyana
- Japan
- Kenya
- New Zealand
- Samoa
- Scotland
- South Africa
- United States
- Wales

== Pool stages ==
=== Pool A ===
Team	Pld	W	D	L	PF	PA	+/-	Pts
New Zealand	3	3	0	0	92	19	+73	9
Australia	3	2	0	1	78	12	+66	7
France	3	0	1	2	24	81	–57	4
Guyana	3	0	1	2	12	94	–82	4

Date	Team 1	Score	Team 2
2010-02-13	New Zealand	12 - 7	Australia
2010-02-13	France	12 - 12	Guyana
2010-02-13	Australia	38 - 0	France
2010-02-13	New Zealand	49 - 0	Guyana
2010-02-13	Australia	33 - 0	Guyana
2010-02-13	New Zealand	31 - 12	France

=== Pool B ===
Team	Pld	W	D	L	PF	PA	+/-	Pts
Fiji	3	3	0	0	52	29	+23	9
South Africa	3	2	0	1	71	24	+47	7
United States	3	1	0	2	50	52	–2	5
Canada	3	0	0	3	17	85	–68	3

Date	Team 1	Score	Team 2
2010-02-13	Fiji	14 - 12	United States
2010-02-13	South Africa	33 - 0	Canada
2010-02-13	Fiji	26 - 12	Canada
2010-02-13	South Africa	33 - 12	United States
2010-02-13	United States	26 - 5	Canada
2010-02-13	Fiji	12 - 5	South Africa

=== Pool C ===
Team	Pld	W	D	L	PF	PA	+/-	Pts
Samoa	3	3	0	0	89	31	+58	9
Kenya	3	2	0	1	57	26	+31	7
Scotland	3	1	0	2	38	68	–30	5
Chile	3	0	0	3	29	88	–59	3

Date	Team 1	Score	Team 2
2010-02-13	Samoa	41 - 12	Scotland
2010-02-13	Kenya	33 - 7	Chile
2010-02-13	Samoa	29 - 12	Chile
2010-02-13	Kenya	17 - 0	Scotland
2010-02-13	Scotland	26 - 10	Chile
2010-02-13	Samoa	19 - 7	Kenya

=== Pool D ===
Team	Pld	W	D	L	PF	PA	+/-	Pts
England	3	2	1	0	62	27	+35	8
Wales	3	2	0	1	53	46	+7	7
Japan	3	1	0	2	17	46	–29	5
Argentina	3	0	1	2	27	40	–13	4

Date	Team 1	Score	Team 2
2010-02-13	England	26 - 10	Wales
2010-02-13	Argentina	0 - 7	Japan
2010-02-13	England	24 - 5	Japan
2010-02-13	Argentina	15 - 21	Wales
2010-02-13	Wales	22 - 5	Japan
2010-02-13	England	12 - 12	Argentina

== Knockout ==
=== Shield ===
Quarter-finals
February 14 - Whitney, Nevada, USA
France	19
Canada	12
February 14 - Whitney, Nevada, USA
Japan	7
Chile	19
February 14 - Whitney, Nevada, USA
Scotland	7
Argentina	14
February 14 - Whitney, Nevada, USA
United States	33
Guyana	12

Semi-finals
February 14 - Whitney, Nevada, USA
Canada	5
Japan	17
February 14 - Whitney, Nevada, USA
Scotland	31
Guyana	7

Final
February 14 - Whitney, Nevada, USA
Japan	7
Scotland	17

=== Bowl ===
Quarter-finals
February 14 - Whitney, Nevada, USA
France	19
Canada	12
February 14 - Whitney, Nevada, USA
Japan	7
Chile	19
February 14 - Whitney, Nevada, USA
Scotland	7
Argentina	14
February 14 - Whitney, Nevada, USA
United States	33
Guyana	12

Semi-finals
February 14 - Whitney, Nevada, USA
France	45
Chile	7
February 14 - Whitney, Nevada, USA
Argentina	14
United States	19

Final
February 14 - Whitney, Nevada, USA
France	17
United States	28

=== Plate ===
Quarter-finals
February 14 - Whitney, Nevada, USA
New Zealand	12
South Africa	5
February 14 - Whitney, Nevada, USA
England	21
Kenya	26
February 14 - Whitney, Nevada, USA
Samoa	17
Wales	10
February 14 - Whitney, Nevada, USA
Fiji	7
Australia	28

Semi-finals
February 14 - Whitney, Nevada, USA
South Africa	27
England	14
February 14 - Whitney, Nevada, USA
Wales	0
Fiji	32

Final
February 14 - Whitney, Nevada, USA
South Africa	12
Fiji	7

=== Cup ===
Quarter-finals
February 14 - Whitney, Nevada, USA
New Zealand	12
South Africa	5
February 14 - Whitney, Nevada, USA
England	21
Kenya	26
February 14 - Whitney, Nevada, USA
Samoa	17
Wales	10
February 14 - Whitney, Nevada, USA
Fiji	7
Australia	28

Semi-finals
February 14 - Whitney, Nevada, USA
New Zealand	21
Kenya	7
February 14 - Whitney, Nevada, USA
Samoa	14
Australia	12

Final
February 14 - Whitney, Nevada, USA
New Zealand	12
Samoa	33

== Player scoring ==
=== Most points ===
Most points
Pos.	Player	Country	Points
1	Mikaele Pesamino	Samoa	55
2	Ben Gollings	England	42
2	Cecil Afrika	South Africa	42
4	Alafoti Fa'osiliva	Samoa	35
4	Nese Malifa	United States	35
6	Emosi Vucago	Fiji	32
7	Matt Hawkins	United States	30
8	James Stannard	Australia	28
9	Mathieu Acebes	France	26
10	Lee Jones	Scotland	25
10	Renaud Delmas	France	25

=== Most tries ===
Most tries
Pos.	Player	Country	Tries
1	Mikaele Pesamino	Samoa	11
2	Alafoti Fa'osiliva	Samoa	7
3	Cecil Afrika	South Africa	6
3	Matt Hawkins	United States	6
5	Renaud Delmas	France	5
5	Lee Jones	Scotland	5
7	7 tied with 4		

Preceded by Wellington Sevens	USA Sevens; 2010	Succeeded by Adelaide Sevens
