= Sila Vaifale =

Samoa international rugby union player

- Full name: Muagututia Tuala Peseta Sila Vaifale
- Born: 5 July 1967 (age 59) Lepea, Samoa
- Height: 6 ft 4 in (1.93 m)
- Weight: 212 lb (96 kg)

Rugby union career
- Position: Flanker
Amateur team(s)
| Years | Team | Apps | (Points) |
| 1992-1995 | Taradale | | |
Senior career
| Years | Team | Apps | (Points) |
| 1989-1992 | Marist St. Joseph | | |
Provincial / State sides
| Years | Team | Apps | (Points) |
| 1992-1995 | Hawke's Bay | 11 | (5) |
International career
| Years | Team | Apps | (Points) |
| 1989-1997 | Samoa | 28 | (16) |

Sila Vaifale (born 5 July 1967) is a former Samoan rugby union player. He made his international debut for Samoa against Romania in Bucharest on 14 October 1989. Vaifale made his last appearance for Samoa against Fiji in Apia on 5 July 1997.

He scored the second try that helped Samoa defeat Wales at the 1991 Rugby World Cup, 16–13. Vaifale was also a member of the 1995 Rugby World Cup. As part of the Samoan national team, he also played at the 1995 Rugby World Cup [6], was involved in the games of the Samoa sevens team at the 1993 and 1997 World Cups.

In 2014 he held one of the posts in the West Apia Rugby Union and oversees the Samoa youth rugby teams.
