= 2010 Edinburgh Sevens =

Rugby sevens tournament

The 2010 Edinburgh Sevens (also known as Scotland Sevens) was a rugby sevens tournament, the eighth and final Cup tournament in the 2009–10 IRB Sevens World Series. The 2010 competition was held at Murrayfield Stadium between 29 May and 30 May.

== Format ==
The tournament, as in all 16-team IRB Sevens events, consisted of four round-robin pools of four teams. All sixteen teams progressed to the knockout stage. The top two teams from each group progressed to quarter-finals in the main competition, with the winners of those quarter-finals competing in cup semi-finals and the losers competing in plate semi-finals. The bottom two teams from each group progressed to quarter-finals in the consolation competition, with the winners of those quarter-finals competing in bowl semi-finals and the losers competing in shield semi-finals.

== Teams ==
- Argentina
- Australia
- Canada
- England
- France
- Fiji
- Italy
- Kenya
- New Zealand
- Portugal
- Russia
- Samoa
- Scotland
- South Africa
- United States
- Wales

== Pool stages ==
=== Pool A ===
Team	Pld	W	D	L	PF	PA	+/-	Pts
Samoa	3	2	0	1	80	62	18	7
Argentina	3	2	0	1	64	38	26	7
France	3	2	0	1	68	40	28	7
Kenya	3	0	0	3	24	96	−72	3

Date	Team 1	Score	Team 2
2010-05-29	Samoa	42–5	Kenya
2010-05-29	Argentina	7–14	France
2010-05-29	Samoa	28–26	France
2010-05-29	Argentina	26–14	Kenya
2010-05-29	Kenya	5–28	France
2010-05-29	Samoa	10–31	Argentina

=== Pool B ===
Team	Pld	W	D	L	PF	PA	+/-	Pts
New Zealand	3	3	0	0	133	17	116	9
South Africa	3	2	0	1	85	36	49	7
Russia	3	1	0	2	31	88	−57	5
Italy	3	0	0	3	17	125	−108	3

Date	Team 1	Score	Team 2
2010-05-29	New Zealand	57–0	Russia
2010-05-29	South Africa	49–5	Italy
2010-05-29	New Zealand	52–0	Italy
2010-05-29	South Africa	19–7	Russia
2010-05-29	Russia	24–12	Italy
2010-05-29	New Zealand	24–17	South Africa

=== Pool C ===
Team	Pld	W	D	L	PF	PA	+/-	Pts
Australia	3	2	1	0	70	42	28	8
England	3	1	1	1	57	52	5	6
Portugal	3	1	0	2	50	66	−16	5
Canada	3	1	0	2	40	57	−17	5

Date	Team 1	Score	Team 2
2010-05-29	Australia	14–0	Canada
2010-05-29	England	17–5	Portugal
2010-05-29	Australia	35–21	Portugal
2010-05-29	England	19–26	Canada
2010-05-29	Canada	14–24	Portugal
2010-05-29	Australia	21–21	England

=== Pool D ===
Team	Pld	W	D	L	PF	PA	+/-	Pts
Scotland	3	3	0	0	97	47	50	9
Fiji	3	2	0	1	64	50	14	7
Wales	3	1	0	2	47	69	−22	5
United States	3	0	0	3	34	76	−42	3

Date	Team 1	Score	Team 2
2010-05-29	United States	10–19	Wales
2010-05-29	Fiji	14–31	Scotland
2010-05-29	United States	12–33	Scotland
2010-05-29	Fiji	26–7	Wales
2010-05-29	United States	12–24	Fiji
2010-05-29	Wales	21–33	Scotland

== Knockout ==
=== Shield ===
Quarter-finals
30 May – Edinburgh
France	19
Italy	5
30 May – Edinburgh
Wales	21
Canada	14
30 May – Edinburgh
Portugal	21
United States	26
30 May – Edinburgh
Russia	0
Kenya	12

Semi-finals
30 May – Edinburgh
Italy	0
Canada	35
30 May – Edinburgh
Portugal	0
Russia	17

Final
30 May – Edinburgh
Canada	7
Russia	26

=== Bowl ===
Quarter-finals
30 May – Edinburgh
France	19
Italy	5
30 May – Edinburgh
Wales	21
Canada	14
30 May – Edinburgh
Portugal	21
United States	26
30 May – Edinburgh
Russia	0
Kenya	12

Semi-finals
30 May – Edinburgh
France	12
Wales	26
30 May – Edinburgh
United States	12
Kenya	17 (a.e.t.)

Final
30 May – Edinburgh
Wales	26
Kenya	10

=== Plate ===
Quarter-finals
30 May – Edinburgh
Samoa	19
South Africa	0
30 May – Edinburgh
Scotland	7
England	19
30 May – Edinburgh
Australia	15
Fiji	7
30 May – Edinburgh
New Zealand	26
Argentina	0

Semi-finals
30 May – Edinburgh
South Africa	14
Scotland	19
30 May – Edinburgh
Fiji	17
Argentina	19

Final
30 May – Edinburgh
Scotland	19
Argentina	0

=== Cup ===
Quarter-finals
30 May – Edinburgh
Samoa	19
South Africa	0
30 May – Edinburgh
Scotland	7
England	19
30 May – Edinburgh
Australia	15
Fiji	7
30 May – Edinburgh
New Zealand	26
Argentina	0

Semi-finals
30 May – Edinburgh
Samoa	15 (a.e.t)
England	12
30 May – Edinburgh
Australia	24
New Zealand	19

Final
30 May – Edinburgh
Samoa	41
Australia	14

Preceded by London Sevens	Edinburgh Sevens; 2010	Succeeded by Dubai Sevens
