= 2010 London Sevens =

The London Sevens (also known as England Sevens) was a rugby union sevens tournament, the seventh of eight Cup tournaments in the 2009–10 IRB Sevens World Series. The 2010 competition was held at Twickenham Stadium between 22 May and 23 May. Australia won the tournament with a 19–14 victory over South Africa in the final. South Africa had beaten Samoa in the semifinals, ending a three-tournament winning streak for the Samoans. New Zealand captured the Plate, Canada won the Bowl, and Kenya won the Shield.

== Format ==
The tournament, as in all 16-team IRB Sevens events, consisted of four round-robin pools of four teams. All sixteen teams progressed to the knockout stage. The top two teams from each group progressed to quarter-finals in the main competition, with the winners of those quarter-finals competing in cup semi-finals and the losers competing in plate semi-finals. The bottom two teams from each group progressed to quarter-finals in the consolation competition, with the winners of those quarter-finals competing in bowl semi-finals and the losers competing in shield semi-finals.

== Teams ==
- Argentina
- Australia
- Canada
- England
- France
- Fiji
- Italy
- Kenya
- New Zealand
- Portugal
- Russia
- Samoa
- Scotland
- South Africa
- United States
- Wales

== Pool stages ==
=== Pool A ===
| Team | Pld | W | D | L | PF | PA | +/- | Pts |
|---|---|---|---|---|---|---|---|---|
| Argentina | 3 | 2 | 0 | 1 | 55 | 24 | 31 | 7 |
| Samoa | 3 | 2 | 0 | 1 | 89 | 28 | 61 | 7 |
| Italy | 3 | 1 | 0 | 2 | 17 | 84 | −67 | 5 |
| United States | 3 | 1 | 0 | 2 | 42 | 67 | −25 | 5 |

| Date | Team 1 | Score | Team 2 |
| 2010-05-22 | Samoa | 38–14 | United States |
| 2010-05-22 | Argentina | 29–0 | Italy |
| 2010-05-22 | Samoa | 41–0 | Italy |
| 2010-05-22 | United States | 14–12 | Argentina |
| 2010-05-22 | Samoa | 10–14 | Argentina |
| 2010-05-22 | United States | 14–17 | Italy |

=== Pool B ===
| Team | Pld | W | D | L | PF | PA | +/- | Pts |
|---|---|---|---|---|---|---|---|---|
| New Zealand | 3 | 2 | 1 | 0 | 97 | 36 | 61 | 8 |
| Wales | 3 | 2 | 0 | 1 | 41 | 62 | −21 | 7 |
| Kenya | 3 | 1 | 1 | 1 | 43 | 56 | −3 | 6 |
| Portugal | 3 | 0 | 0 | 3 | 39 | 66 | −27 | 3 |

| Date | Team 1 | Score | Team 2 |
| 2010-05-22 | New Zealand | 43–5 | Wales |
| 2010-05-22 | Kenya | 17–15 | Portugal |
| 2010-05-22 | New Zealand | 35–12 | Portugal |
| 2010-05-22 | Wales | 22–7 | Kenya |
| 2010-05-22 | New Zealand | 19–19 | Kenya |
| 2010-05-22 | Wales | 14–12 | Portugal |

=== Pool C ===
| Team | Pld | W | D | L | PF | PA | +/- | Pts |
|---|---|---|---|---|---|---|---|---|
| South Africa | 3 | 2 | 1 | 0 | 83 | 33 | 50 | 8 |
| Fiji | 3 | 2 | 1 | 0 | 78 | 54 | 24 | 8 |
| Canada | 3 | 1 | 0 | 2 | 45 | 76 | −31 | 5 |
| France | 3 | 0 | 0 | 3 | 31 | 74 | −43 | 3 |

| Date | Team 1 | Score | Team 2 |
| 2010-05-22 | Fiji | 28–19 | Canada |
| 2010-05-22 | South Africa | 19–12 | France |
| 2010-05-22 | Fiji | 29–14 | France |
| 2010-05-22 | South Africa | 43–0 | Canada |
| 2010-05-22 | Fiji | 21–21 | South Africa |
| 2010-05-22 | Canada | 26–5 | France |

=== Pool D ===
| Team | Pld | W | D | L | PF | PA | +/- | Pts |
|---|---|---|---|---|---|---|---|---|
| Australia | 3 | 3 | 0 | 0 | 128 | 22 | 106 | 9 |
| England | 3 | 2 | 0 | 1 | 70 | 53 | 17 | 7 |
| Scotland | 3 | 1 | 0 | 2 | 51 | 86 | −35 | 5 |
| Russia | 3 | 0 | 0 | 3 | 12 | 100 | −88 | 3 |

| Date | Team 1 | Score | Team 2 |
| 2010-05-22 | Australia | 43–17 | Scotland |
| 2010-05-22 | England | 29–5 | Russia |
| 2010-05-22 | Australia | 47–0 | Russia |
| 2010-05-22 | England | 36–10 | Scotland |
| 2010-05-22 | Australia | 38–5 | England |
| 2010-05-22 | Scotland | 24–7 | Russia |

== Knockout ==
=== Shield ===
Quarter-finals
23 May – London
Italy | 0
Portugal | 41
23 May – London
Scotland | 21
France | 12
23 May – London
Canada | 21
Russia | 12
23 May – London
Kenya | 10
United States | 19

Semi-finals
23 May – London
Italy | 7
France | 29
23 May – London
Russia | 17
Kenya | 21

Final
23 May – London
France | 21
Kenya | 24

=== Bowl ===
Quarter-finals
23 May – London
Italy | 0
Portugal | 41
23 May – London
Scotland | 21
France | 12
23 May – London
Canada | 21
Russia | 12
23 May – London
Kenya | 10
United States | 19

Semi-finals
23 May – London
Portugal | 24
Scotland | 19
23 May – London
Canada | 22
United States | 17

Final
23 May – London
Portugal | 17
Canada | 19

=== Plate ===
Quarter-finals
23 May – London
Argentina | 27
Wales | 14
23 May – London
Australia | 29
Fiji | 28
23 May – London
South Africa | 17
England | 12
23 May – London
New Zealand | 10
Samoa | 19

Semi-finals
23 May – London
Wales | 10
Fiji | 22
23 May – London
England | 19
New Zealand | 22

Final
23 May – London
Fiji | 24
New Zealand | 26

=== Cup ===
Quarter-finals
23 May – London
Argentina | 27
Wales | 14
23 May – London
Australia | 29
Fiji | 28
23 May – London
South Africa | 17
England | 12
23 May – London
New Zealand | 10
Samoa | 19

Semi-finals
23 May – London
Argentina | 14
Australia | 26
23 May – London
South Africa | 24
Samoa | 12

Final
23 May – London
Australia | 19
South Africa | 14

| Preceded by Hong Kong Sevens | London Sevens; 2010 | Succeeded by Edinburgh Sevens |
