= Uale Mai =

Samoa international rugby union player (born 1978)

Uale Mai Vala
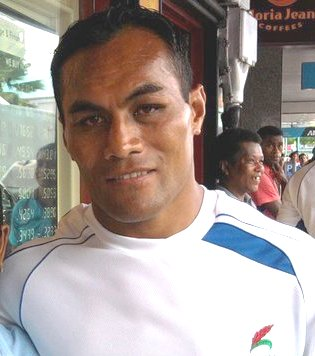
- Uale Mai in Fiji.
- Born: 20 July 1978 (age 48) Samoa
- Height: 1.76 m (5 ft 9 in)
- Weight: 88 kg (194 lb)

Rugby union career
- Position: Fly half
Amateur team(s)
Years	Team	Apps	(Points)
- Wainuiomata
2010	CR El Salvador		
International career
Years	Team	Apps	(Points)
2008–11	Samoa	16	
National sevens team
Years	Team		Comps
- Samoa 7s

Uale Mai Vala (born 20 July 1978) is a retired rugby union player who played for the country's national teams, Manu Samoa and Samoa Sevens. He is a former captain of the Samoa Sevens team which represent Samoa internationally in the IRB Sevens World Series. He was at the time of his retirement sevens rugby's most capped player (a record since surpassed by New Zealand's DJ Forbes), and Mai is considered one of the greats in the international sport. Mai has been one of the top points scorers in the IRB World Sevens Series.

Mai is from Vailoa village in Palauli district on the island of Savai'i. Mai was the first Samoan to be awarded the IRB International Sevens Player of the Year, which he received for the 2005–06 World Sevens Series. The ceremony took place in Glasgow on 26 November 2006.

Mai was awarded Player of the Tournament at the 2007 Hong Kong Sevens. In 2008, he was awarded the Samoan Senior Player of the Year and also received a nomination for the IRB International Sevens Player of the Year. In 2009, Mai took a short break from the Samoa Sevens team but returned in 2010 under new coach Stephen Betham.

In fifteens, he is comfortable at flyhalf and scrumhalf, where he represents Samoa in the Samoa national rugby union team. In 2010, he joined CR El Salvador in Spain's Division de Honor. " I also do this for my son Sene Nuulua now educated at NUS"

Mai was awarded the Head of State's Service Medal in the 2014 Samoa Honours and Awards.

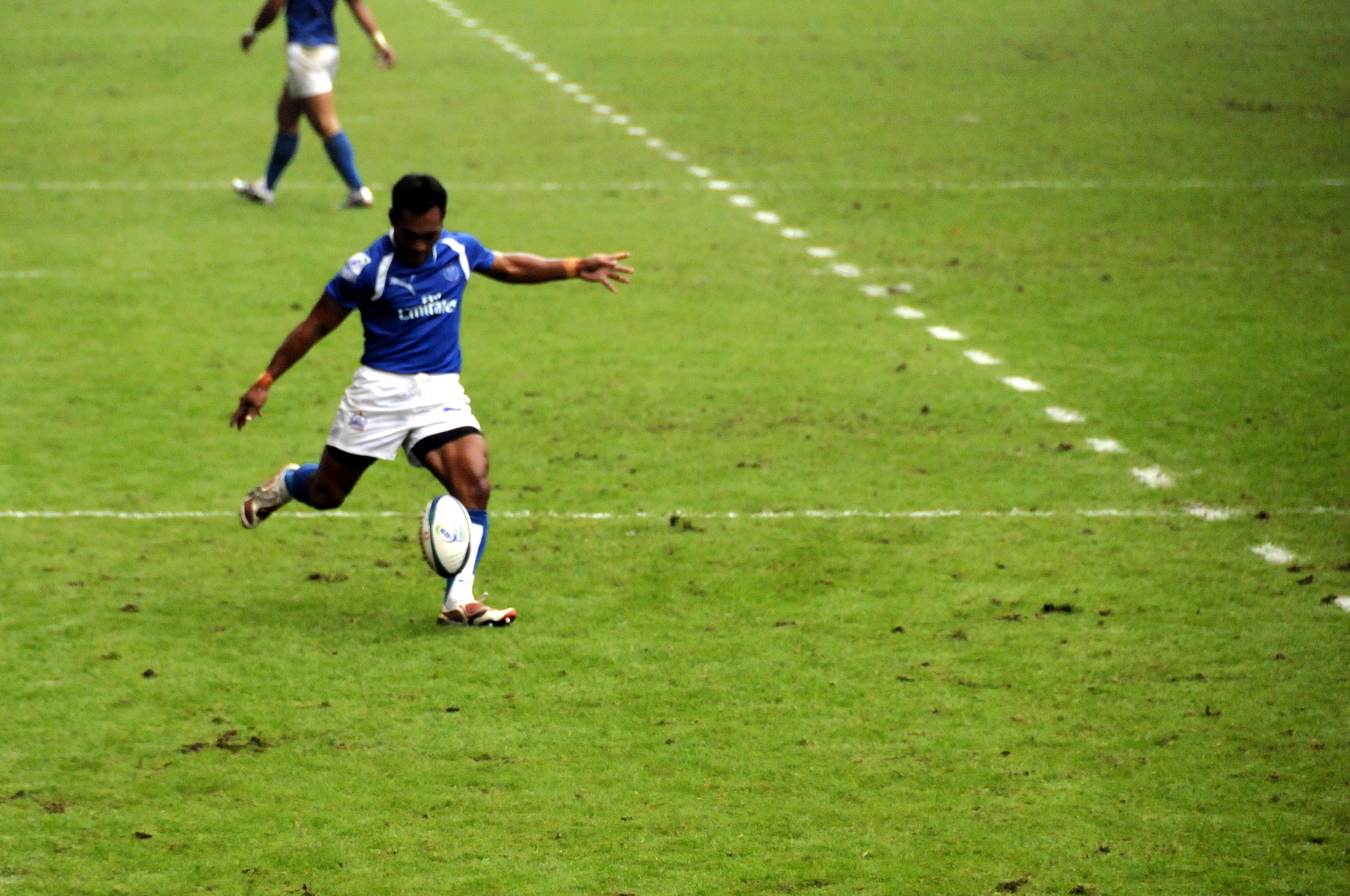
Uale Mai, 2009.
