= Malaki Iupeli =

Samoa international rugby union player (1965–1996)

- Born: November 23, 1965 Apia, Samoa
- Died: 1996 (aged 30–31) Apia, Samoa

Rugby union career
- Position: Flanker
Senior career
Years	Team	Apps	(Points)
????	Marist St. Joseph		
International career
Years	Team	Apps	(Points)
1988-1995	Samoa	16	(0)

Malaki Iupeli (23 November 1965 - 1996) is a former Samoan rugby union player. He played as a flanker.

== Career ==
At club level, Iupeli played for Marist St. Joseph for his entire career. His first international match was on May 28, 1988 against Tonga at Apia. Although not being included in the 1991 Rugby World Cup roster, he was part of the 1995 Rugby World Cup roster, playing only the match against England, in Durban. He played 16 matches for Samoa.

== Death ==
In 1995, Iupeli was diagnosed with HIV, and later his wife Peati Iupeli and his eldest young son became infected with the virus. A year later, both Malaki and his eldest son died. Peati, being HIV-positive, was fired from the bank where she had previously worked. After the death of her husband, she became a well-known AIDS activist, raising single-handedly the second child from Malaki, a son named Natal. She lived to be 60 years old and died on 28 May 2015.
