= Peter Schuster (rugby union) =

Samoan former rugby union player and coach

- Born: circa 1952 (age 73–74) Apia, Samoa
- Notable relative(s): Peter Schuster (son); John Schuster (brother); David Schuster(brother); Josh Schuster (nephew)

Rugby union career
- Position: Fullback
Senior career
Years	Team	Apps	(Points)
1970-197?	Marist St. Joseph		
International career
Years	Team	Apps	(Points)
1975	Samoa	1	(0)
Coaching career
- Years: Team
- 1988–95: Samoa

Su'a Peter Felise Schuster (born in Apia, circa 1952) is a Samoan former rugby union player. He played as a fullback. He was the Samoa Rugby Union chairman between 2007 and 2012.

== Career ==
Schuster was one of the players of the inaugural Marist St. Joseph side in 1970; after that, Marist Rugby Club and St Joseph's Rugby Club merged. His first international cap for Samoa was during a match against Tonga, on 4 June 1975. His last cap was also against Tonga, in Apia on 13 July of that same year.

== Coaching career ==
Between 1988 and 1995, he coached the Samoa national rugby union team, leading the Manu Samoa to the 1991 and 1995 Rugby World Cups. He retired from his coaching career in 1995.
