= Brackin Karauria-Henry =

New Zealand rugby player

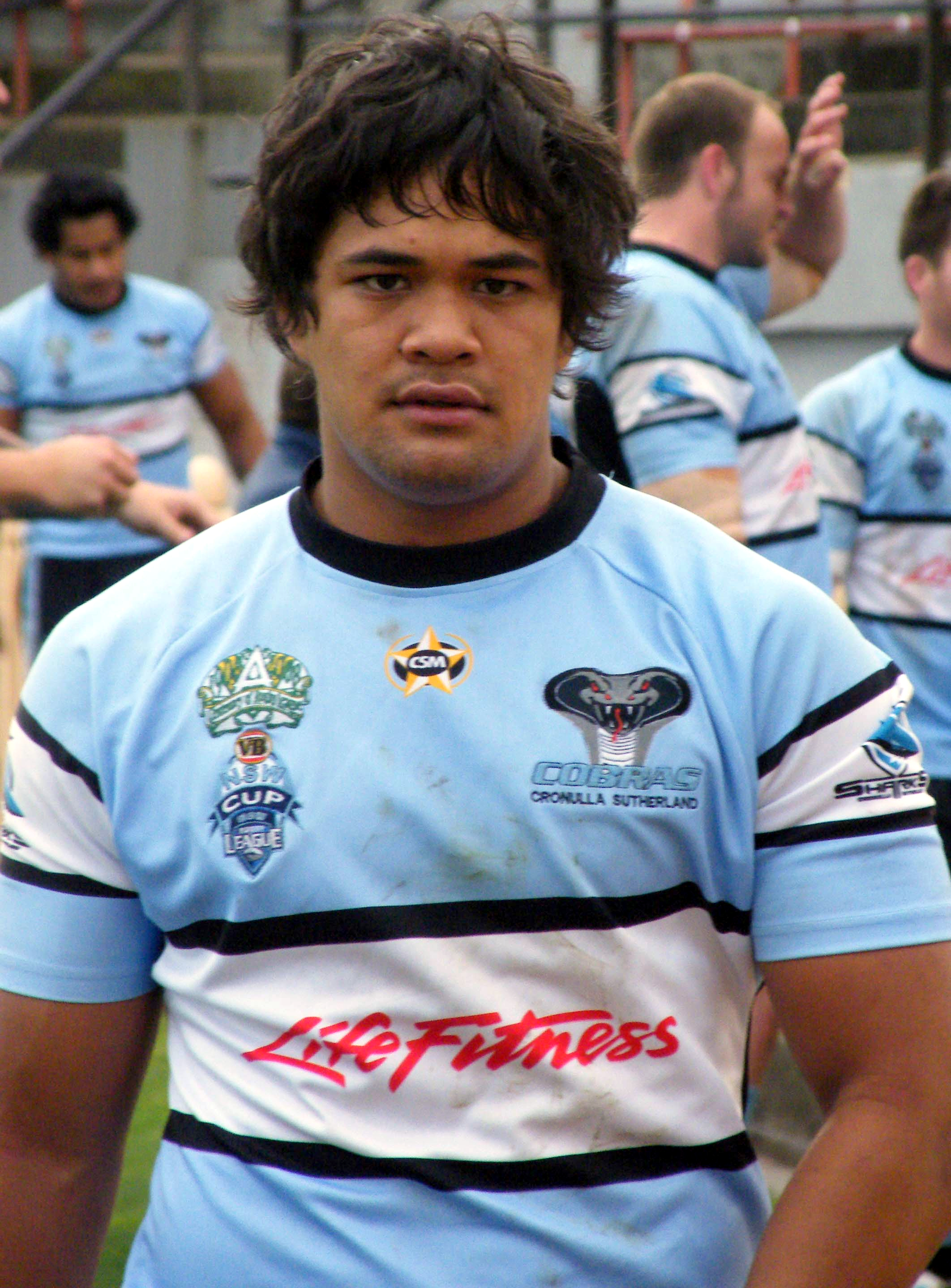
- Born: Brackin Karauria-Henry; 31 July 1988 (age 38) Auckland, New Zealand
- Height: 1.80 m (5 ft 11 in)
- Weight: 88 kg (194 lb)
- School: Christchurch Boys’ High School

Rugby union career
- Position(s): Centre, Wing, Fullback
Senior career
Years	Team	Apps	(Points)
2012–2022	NTT Com Shining Arcs	101	(125)
2022–2024	Mitsubishi DynaBoars	26	(25)
- Correct as of 21 February 2021
Super Rugby
Years	Team	Apps	(Points)
2010	Brumbies	2	(0)
2011–2012	Waratahs	2	(0)
- Correct as of 21 April 2012
National sevens teams
Years	Team		Comps
2009–2010	Australia Sevens		8
2021	Japan Sevens		1
- Correct as of 21 February 2021

Brackin Karauria-Henry (born 31 July 1988) is a New Zealand rugby footballer who has played rugby sevens for Australia. As of 2018 he plays for Japanese Top League club NTT Com Shining Arcs. He previously played Super Rugby for the Brumbies and NSW Waratahs. His usual position is centre. He competed for Japan 2020 Summer Olympics.

== Rugby career ==
Karauria-Henry was born in Auckland and grew up in Christchurch where he attended Christchurch Boys' High School.

In 2006 Karauria-Henry left New Zealand to play rugby league in Australia for the Cronulla Sharks in the NSW Cup competition. He was just 16 at the time and attended Endeavour Sports High in Sydney.

He switched codes in 2009 to play rugby union for Southern Districts and became qualified to play for Australia. Selected in the national sevens team, Karauria-Henry was Australia's leading try scorer during the 2009–10 Sevens World Series circuit. He signed with the Brumbies in 2010 and, in October that year, was selected to join the Wallabies training squad for the 2010 Spring Tour.

Karauria-Henry joined the NSW Waratahs for a further two seasons of Super Rugby, before moving to Japan where he signed with NTT Com.
