= Sherwin Stowers =

New Zealand rugby union player

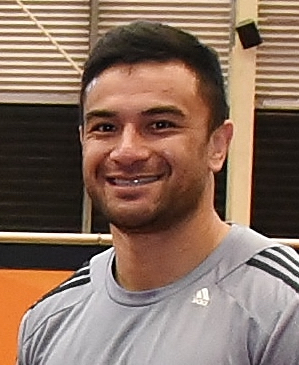
- Stowers in 2017
- Born: Sherwin Stowers; 19 May 1986 (age 40) Auckland, New Zealand
- Height: 1.76 m (5 ft 9 in)
- Weight: 90 kg (14 st 2 lb; 198 lb)
- School: De La Salle College, Mangere East

Rugby union career
- Position: Fullback / Wing
Amateur team(s)
Years	Team	Apps	(Points)
2007–	Ardmore Marist		
Provincial / State sides
Years	Team	Apps	(Points)
2008–2016	Counties Manukau	78	(149)
- Correct as of 23 October 2016
Super Rugby
Years	Team	Apps	(Points)
2011–12	Blues	18	(5)
- Correct as of 25 July 2012
National sevens team
Years	Team		Comps
2004–2017	New Zealand 7s		38 (630 pts)
Medal record
Men's rugby sevens
Representing New Zealand
Commonwealth Games
Gold medal – first place	2010 Delhi	Team competition
Silver medal – second place	2014 Glasgow	Team competition

Sherwin Stowers (born 19 May 1986) is a New Zealand former rugby player. He played for the Blues Super Rugby side, for whom he made 11 appearances following his 2011 debut. He also played for Counties Manukau in the New Zealand Provincial ITM Cup.

Stowers played for the New Zealand national rugby sevens team in the Sevens World Series. He played at the 2010 and 2014 Commonwealth Games. He announced his retirement from professional rugby in 2017.
