= 2009–10 IRB Sevens World Series =

Rugby tournament

2009–10 IRB Sevens
- Series XI
- Hosts: United Arab Emirates; South Africa; New Zealand; United States; Hong Kong; Australia; England; Scotland
- Date: 4 December 2009 - 30 May 2010

Final positions
- Champions: Samoa
- Runners-up: New Zealand
- Third: Australia

The 2009–10 IRB Sevens World Series was the eleventh of an annual series of rugby union sevens tournaments for full national sides run by the International Rugby Board since 1999–2000. Samoa won the IRB Sevens World Series crown for their first time.

Sevens is traditionally played in a two-day tournament format. However, the most famous event, the Hong Kong Sevens, is played over three days, largely because it involves 24 teams instead of the normal 16.

The 2009-10 Series was won by Samoa, who won four of the eight tournaments and placed second in two others. Samoa were led by top try-scorer Mikaele Pesamino, who led the Series with 56 tries.

== Itinerary ==
The series' tournaments were identical to those in 2008–09 and spanned the globe, visiting five of the six populated continents.

2009–10 Itinerary
Leg	Venue	Date	Winner
Dubai	The Sevens	December 4–5, 2009	New Zealand
South Africa	Outeniqua Park, George	December 11–12, 2009	New Zealand
New Zealand	Westpac Stadium, Wellington	February 5–6, 2010	Fiji
United States	Sam Boyd Stadium, Las Vegas	February 13–14, 2010	Samoa
Australia	Adelaide Oval, Adelaide	March 19–21, 2010	Samoa
Hong Kong	Hong Kong Stadium	March 26–28, 2010	Samoa
London	Twickenham	May 22–23, 2010	Australia
Edinburgh	Murrayfield, Edinburgh	May 29–30, 2010	Samoa

Two minor changes were made to the schedule:

- The USA event moved from San Diego, its home from 2007 to 2009, to Las Vegas.
- The Adelaide event moved from its previous slot of one week after Hong Kong to one week before.

== Core teams ==
Before each season, the IRB announces the 12 "core teams" that will receive guaranteed berths in each event in that season's series. The core teams for 2009–10 were:

- Argentina
- Australia
- England
- Fiji
- France
- Kenya
- New Zealand
- Samoa
- Scotland
- South Africa
- United States
- Wales

The core teams were unchanged from 2008–09; the most recent change came before that season, when the USA replaced its neighbor Canada.

== Points schedule ==
The season championship is determined by points earned in each tournament. Effective with this season, the IRB changed the points allocations for all events as follows:

16-team events (all except for Hong Kong)

- Cup winner (1st place): 24 points
- Cup runner-up: 20 points
- Losing Cup semifinalists: 16 points
- Plate winner (5th place): 12 points
- Plate runner-up: 8 points
- Losing Plate semifinalists: 6 points
- Bowl winner (9th place): 4 points

24-team event (Hong Kong)

- Cup winner: 30 points
- Cup runner-up: 25 points
- Losing Cup semifinalists: 20 points
- Plate winner (5th place): 16 points
- Plate runner-up: 10 points
- Losing Plate semifinalists: 8 points
- Bowl winner (9th place): 5 points

== Tournament structure ==
In all tournaments except Hong Kong, 16 teams participate. Due to its place as the sport's most prestigious annual event, the Hong Kong tournament has 24 teams. In each 16-team tournament, the teams are divided into pools of four teams, who play a round-robin within the pool. Points are awarded in each pool on a different schedule from most rugby tournaments—3 for a win, 2 for a draw, 1 for a loss. The first tiebreaker is the head-to-head result between the tied teams, followed by difference in points scored during the tournament.

Four trophies are awarded in each tournament. In descending order of prestige, they are the Cup, whose winner is the overall tournament champion, Plate, Bowl and Shield. The Shield was contested in Hong Kong for the first time in 2010. Each trophy is awarded at the end of a knockout tournament.

In a 16-team tournament, the top two teams in each pool advance to the Cup competition. The four quarterfinal losers drop into the bracket for the Plate. The Bowl is contested by the third- and fourth-place finishers in each pool, with the losers in the Bowl quarterfinals dropping into the bracket for the Shield.

The Hong Kong Sevens adopted a new structure effective with its 2010 edition. As in previous years, the 24 teams were divided into six pools of four teams each, with the competition points system and tiebreakers identical to those for a 16-team event. Also as in the past, the six pool winners and the two top second-place finishers advanced to the Cup competition. The changes made in 2010 were:

- The Plate competition was contested by the losing quarterfinalists from the Cup, as in all other events in the series.
- The Bowl was contested by the four remaining second-place finishers and the top four third-place finishers. In previous years, these teams competed for the Plate.
- The Shield was contested by the remaining eight entrants. In previous years, these teams competed for the Bowl.

== Final standings ==
The points awarded to teams at each event, as well as the overall season totals, are shown in the table below. Gold indicates the event champions. Silver indicates the event runner-ups. A zero (0) is recorded in the event column where a team competed in a tournament but did not gain any points. A dash (–) is recorded in the event column if a team did not compete at a tournament.

2009–10 IRB Sevens – Series XI
Pos.	Event Team	Dubai	George	Wellington	Las Vegas	Adelaide	Hong Kong	London	Edinburgh	Points total
1	Samoa	20	6	20	24	24	30	16	24	164
2	New Zealand	24	24	16	20	12	25	12	16	149
3	Australia	12	6	12	16	16	16	24	20	122
4	Fiji	16	20	24	8	6	20	8	6	108
5	England	16	12	16	6	4	20	6	16	96
6	South Africa	8	8	8	12	8	10	20	6	80
7	Argentina	6	16	0	0	16	0	16	8	62
8	Kenya	6	16	6	16	0	8	0	0	52
9	Wales	4	4	4	6	6	0	6	4	34
10	United States	0	0	0	4	20	8	0	0	32
11	Canada	–	–	6	0	–	5	4	0	15
12	Scotland	0	0	0	0	0	0	0	12	12
13	France	0	0	0	0	0	0	0	0	0

Legend
Gold	Event Champions
Silver	Event Runner-ups
Light blue line on the left indicates a core team eligible to participate in all events of the series.

== Player scoring ==
=== Most points ===
Most points
Pos.	Player	Country	Points
1	Ben Gollings	England	332
2	Mikaele Pesamino	Samoa	282
3	Lolo Lui	Samoa	264
4	James Stannard	Australia	257
5	Tomasi Cama	New Zealand	241
6	Cecil Afrika	South Africa	210
7	Kurt Baker	New Zealand	191
8	Lavin Asego	Kenya	173
9	Mzwandile Stick	South Africa	171
10	William Ryder	Fiji	166

=== Most tries ===
Most tries
Pos.	Player	Country	Tries
1	Mikaele Pesamino	Samoa	56
2=	Kurt Baker	New Zealand	33
2=	Humphrey Kayange	Kenya	33
4=	Rayno Benjamin	South Africa	32
4=	Collins Injera	Kenya	32
6	Brackin Karauria-Henry	Australia	30
7	Alafoti Fa'osiliva	Samoa	29
8=	Renaud Delmas	France	28
8=	Clinton Sills	Australia	28
10	Sherwin Stowers	New Zealand	27

== Tournaments ==
=== Dubai ===
Event	Winners	Score	Finalists	Semi Finalists
Cup	New Zealand	24 – 12	Samoa	England; Fiji
Plate	Australia	7 – 0	South Africa	Argentina; Kenya
Bowl	Wales	38 – 7	Zimbabwe	United States; France
Shield	Russia	17 – 14	Portugal	Scotland; Arabian Gulf

=== South Africa ===
Event	Winners	Score	Finalists	Semi Finalists
Cup	New Zealand	21 – 12	Fiji	Argentina; Kenya
Plate	England	21 – 7	South Africa	Samoa; Australia
Bowl	Wales	14 – 5	Russia	United States; Portugal
Shield	Scotland	28 – 19	France	Zimbabwe; Tunisia

=== New Zealand ===
Event	Winners	Score	Finalists	Semi Finalists
Cup	Fiji	19 – 14	Samoa	England; New Zealand
Plate	Australia	26 – 22	South Africa	Canada; Kenya
Bowl	Wales	7 – 5	France	Argentina; Niue
Shield	United States	17 – 14	Tonga	Papua New Guinea; Scotland

=== United States ===
Event	Winners	Score	Finalists	Semi Finalists
Cup	Samoa	33 – 12	New Zealand	Australia; Kenya
Plate	South Africa	12 – 7	Fiji	England; Wales
Bowl	United States	28 – 17	France	Argentina; Chile
Shield	Scotland	17 – 7	Japan	Canada; Guyana

=== Australia ===
Event	Winners	Score	Finalists	Semi Finalists
Cup	Samoa	38 – 10	United States	Argentina; Australia
Plate	New Zealand	21 – 14	South Africa	Fiji; Wales
Bowl	England	33 – 12	Kenya	France; Scotland
Shield	Japan	22 – 19	Tonga	Niue; Papua New Guinea

=== Hong Kong ===
Event	Winners	Score	Finalists	Semi Finalists	Quarter Finalists
Cup	Samoa	24 – 21	New Zealand	England; Fiji	
Plate	Australia	12 – 5	South Africa	Kenya; United States	
Bowl	Canada	35 – 19	Wales	Portugal; Scotland	Argentina; France; Japan; Tonga
Shield	Hong Kong	19 – 17	Russia	Italy; Zimbabwe	China; Chinese Taipei; South Korea; Thailand

=== London ===
Event	Winners	Score	Finalists	Semi Finalists
Cup	Australia	19 – 14	South Africa	Argentina; Samoa
Plate	New Zealand	26 – 24	Fiji	England; Wales
Bowl	Canada	19 – 17	Portugal	Scotland; United States
Shield	Kenya	24 – 21	France	Italy; Russia

=== Scotland ===
Event	Winners	Score	Finalists	Semi Finalists
Cup	Samoa	41 – 14	Australia	England; New Zealand
Plate	Scotland	19 – 0	Argentina	Fiji; South Africa
Bowl	Wales	26 – 10	Kenya	France; United States
Shield	Russia	26 – 7	Canada	Italy; Portugal
