= William Ryder (rugby union) =

Fijian rugby union footballer (born 1982)

William James Ryder
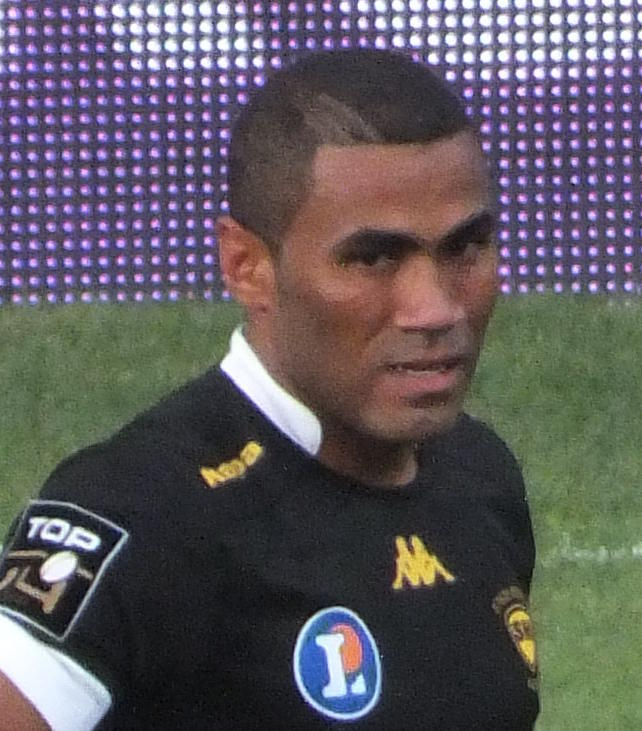
- William Ryder playing for Stade Montois
- Born: 6 June 1982 (age 44) Fiji
- Height: 1.74 m (5 ft 9 in)
- Weight: 77 kg (12 st 2 lb; 170 lb)

Rugby union career
- Position(s): wing, fullback. fly-half, scrum-half
- Current team: Toyota Verblitz
Amateur team(s)
Years	Team	Apps	(Points)
- Lancaster RGS
Senior career
Years	Team	Apps	(Points)
2004–present	Toyota Verblitz	33	(222)
National sevens team
Years	Team		Comps
2005 – present	Fiji 7s		987 (105 Tries)
- Correct as of 18 March 2010
Medal record
Men's rugby sevens
Representing Fiji
Commonwealth Games
Bronze medal – third place	2006 Melbourne	Team competition

William Ryder (born 6 June 1982) is a Fijian rugby union footballer. Ryder is well known within the rugby sevens community, as he has produced some of the best performances for the Fiji national sevens side. He is well known for his try scoring capability and goosestepping defenders. He was also one of the top try scorers of the World Sevens Series which has been overtaken recently. He has scored over 752 points to-date of which he has scored 105 tries. He was a part of the team that won the sevens world cup in 2005 and also won a bronze medal at the 2006 Commonwealth Games in Melbourne, Australia for the rugby sevens event.

Ryder played club rugby in Japan with Toyota Verblitz but he left and joined the Fiji sevens team for the 2009–10 IRB Sevens World Series. On 17 May 2011 it was announced that he had signed for Stade Montois. He wanted to join the Fiji team in 2013 under the guidance of Ben Ryan for the first time in 3 years but was left from the final squad as Ryan stated he is not as fit as he was three years ago. He kept on playing for local clubs in the domestic tournament to book a place in the Fiji team but it was unsuccessful all throughout the years.
