= Lolo Lui =

Samoa international rugby union player

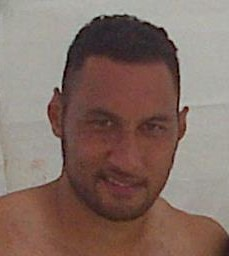
- Born: 4 January 1982 (age 44) Apia, Samoa
- Height: 1.85 m (6 ft 1 in)
- Weight: 13 st 5 lb (85 kg)

Rugby union career
- Position: First-Five/Fullback
International career
| Years | Team | Apps | (Points) |
| 2004-2012 | Samoa | 25 | (36) |
National sevens team
| Years | Team | | Comps |
- Samoa 7s

Lolo Lui (born 4 January 1982) is a Samoan rugby union player. He captained the Samoa Sevens team which won the 2009–10 IRB Sevens World Series.

Lui was born and raised in Moata'a, the same village as former All Blacks star Michael Jones and many other famous Samoan rugby players, such as Taufusi Salesa, Lolani Koko, and Alefaio Vaisuai.

Lui first made an appearance in national colours in the National Under 18 World Rugby Championship held in Chile in 1999. He also represented Manu Samoa at the 2007 Rugby World Cup.

A sevens specialist, Lui made his name on the sevens circuit and was a surprise selection ahead of Tanner Vili. However, he was not given much chance in the competition as Eliota Fuimaono was preferred out of position at fly half against pool A giants England and South Africa, and the reliable presence of Loki Crichton was thought to be needed to provide wins against Tonga and the USA. He plays his club rugby for Samoan side Moata'a apart from a six-month stint with the Leonessa Rugby Club in Italy in 2006.
