= Mikaele Pesamino =

- Born: Mikaele Pesamino; 2 April 1984 (age 42) Vailele, Upolu, Samoa
- Height: 1.88 m (6 ft 2 in)
- Weight: 90 kg (14 st 2 lb)
- School: Leififi College

Rugby union career
- Position: Wing
Senior career
Years	Team	Apps	(Points)
2007–10	Auckland	2	
2010–	Sale Sharks		
International career
Years	Team	Apps	(Points)
2009–10	Samoa	6	(35)
National sevens team
Years	Team		Comps
2007–11	Samoa 7s		639

Mikaele Pesamino (born 2 April 1984) is a rugby union player in the Samoa Sevens team. He was the highest point scorer in the 2009–2010 IRB Sevens World Series helping his country in securing their first World Series crown and was awarded the 2010 IRB World Rugby Sevens Player of the Year.

== Early sporting career ==
Pesamino was born in Vailele on the island of Upolu in Samoa. Pesamino was first discovered for his speed, when he represented Leifiifi College in the annual Champ of Chapms athletic competition. But ever since, he focused on his rugby career. His career began in both rugby union and Australian rules football. While still a teenager, he was a member of the Samoan national Australian rules football team during the 2002 Australian Football International Cup (where he was named in the All-International team), and then the 2005 Australian Football International Cup.

== Samoa sevens ==
Pesamino was the third highest try scorer in the 2007–2008 Sevens Series and the top try scorer in the 2009–2010 Series winning season. Pesamino scored a try in the final of the 2007 Wellington Sevens to help give Samoa its first-ever tournament win with a 17–14 victory over Fiji in the final.

The Samoa national rugby sevens team plays in the IRB Sevens World Series, which takes place annually in several countries.

== Fifteens career ==
Pesamino played provincial rugby for Auckland in the Air New Zealand Cup.

Pesamino signed for Sale Sharks in summer 2010 for the 2010/2011 season. However, Pesamino had issues with his work visa, and Pesamino's transfer was further delayed by Pesamino's involvement with Samoa in the 2010 Commonwealth Games and then Samoa's November tour of Europe. Sale abandoned the deal in January 2011.
