= 1995 Rugby World Cup squads =

Men's rugby union squads

This article lists the official squads for the 1995 Rugby World Cup in South Africa from 25 May to 24 June 1995. Players marked (c) were named as captain for their national squad. All details, such as number of international caps and player age, are current as of the opening day of the tournament on 25 May 1995.

== Pool A ==
=== Australia ===
Head coach: (Australia) Bob Dwyer

Note: Flags indicate national union for the club/province as defined by World Rugby.

Player	Position	Date of birth (age)	Caps	Club/province
Phil Kearns	Hooker	27 June 1967 (aged 27)	39	(Australia) Randwick / New South Wales
Michael Foley	Hooker	7 June 1967 (aged 27)	0	(Australia) Souths / Queensland
Tony Daly	Prop	7 March 1966 (aged 29)	39	(Australia) Randwick / New South Wales
Dan Crowley	Prop	28 August 1965 (aged 29)	10	(Australia) Souths / Queensland
Ewen McKenzie	Prop	21 June 1965 (aged 29)	40	(Australia) Randwick / New South Wales
Mark Hartill	Prop	29 May 1964 (aged 30)	17	(Australia) Gordon / New South Wales
Rod McCall	Lock	20 September 1963 (aged 31)	37	(Australia) Brothers / Queensland
John Eales	Lock	27 June 1970 (aged 24)	25	(Australia) Brothers / Queensland
Warwick Waugh	Lock	17 September 1968 (aged 26)	1	(Australia) Randwick / New South Wales
Daniel Manu	Flanker	4 June 1970 (aged 24)	0	(Australia) Eastwood / New South Wales
Ilivasi Tabua	Flanker	30 September 1964 (aged 30)	8	(Australia) GPS / Queensland
David Wilson	Flanker	4 January 1967 (aged 28)	24	(Australia) Easts Tigers / Queensland
Tim Gavin	Number 8	20 November 1963 (aged 31)	38	(Australia) Eastern Suburbs / New South Wales
Troy Coker	Number 8	30 May 1965 (aged 29)	16	(Australia) Souths / Queensland
Viliami Ofahengaue	Number 8	3 May 1968 (aged 27)	21	(Australia) Manly / New South Wales
George Gregan	Scrum-half	19 April 1973 (aged 22)	6	(Australia) Easts / ACT Kookaburras
Peter Slattery	Scrum-half	6 June 1965 (aged 29)	15	(Australia) University / Queensland
Michael Lynagh (c)	Fly-half	25 October 1963 (aged 31)	69	(Australia) University / Queensland
Scott Bowen	Fly-half	20 September 1972 (aged 22)	3	(Australia) Southern Districts / New South Wales
Daniel Herbert	Centre	6 February 1974 (aged 21)	67	(Australia) GPS / Queensland
Jason Little	Centre	26 August 1970 (aged 24)	33	(Australia) Souths / Queensland
Tim Horan	Centre	18 May 1970 (aged 25)	33	(Australia) Souths / Queensland
Joe Roff	Wing	20 September 1975 (aged 19)	0	(Australia) Tuggeranong / ACT Kookaburras
David Campese	Wing	21 October 1962 (aged 32)	88	(Australia) Randwick / New South Wales
Damian Smith	Wing	1 February 1969 (aged 26)	13	(Australia) Souths / Queensland
Matt Pini	Fullback	21 March 1969 (aged 26)	6	(Australia) Wests / Queensland
Matt Burke	Fullback	26 March 1973 (aged 22)	6	(Australia) Eastwood / New South Wales

=== Canada ===
Head coach: (England) Ian Birtwell

Note: Flags indicate national union for the club/province as defined by World Rugby.

Player	Position	Date of birth (age)	Caps	Club/province
Mark Cardinal	Hooker	5 May 1961 (aged 34)	14	(Canada) James Bay A.A.
Karl Svoboda	Hooker	23 March 1962 (aged 33)	22	(Canada) Ajax Wanderers R.U.F.C.
Richard Bice	Prop	1 March 1968 (aged 27)	0	(Canada) Vancouver Rowing Club
Paul LeBlanc	Prop	9 October 1967 (aged 27)	0	(Canada) Vancouver Kats R.C.
Rod Snow	Prop	1 May 1970 (aged 25)	2	(Canada) Dogs RFC
Eddie Evans	Prop	15 September 1964 (aged 30)	35	IBM Japan
Al Charron	Lock	27 July 1966 (aged 28)	19	(Canada) Ottawa Irish R.C.
Gareth Rowlands	Lock	12 March 1971 (aged 24)	2	(Canada) Velox Valhallians
Mike James	Lock	10 July 1973 (aged 21)	19	(Canada) Burnaby Lake R.C.
Ian Gordon	Flanker	12 March 1968 (aged 27)	11	(Canada) James Bay A.A.
John Hutchinson	Flanker	24 April 1969 (aged 26)	6	(Canada) UBC Old Boys Ravens
Gord MacKinnon	Flanker	27 July 1958 (aged 36)	26	(Canada) Britannia Lions R.C.
Glen Ennis	Number 8	19 May 1964 (aged 31)	25	(Canada) Vancouver Kats R.C.
Chris Michaluk	Number 8	11 June 1970 (aged 24)	0	(Canada) Vancouver Rowing Club
Colin McKenzie	Number 8	24 November 1964 (aged 30)	16	(Canada) UBC Old Boys Ravens
John Graf	Scrum-half	3 December 1968 (aged 26)	21	(Canada) UBC Old Boys Ravens
Alan Tynan	Scrum-half	23 August 1972 (aged 22)	3	(Canada) UBC Old Boys Ravens
Gareth Rees (c)	Fly-half	30 June 1967 (aged 27)	31	(Canada) Castaway Wanderers RFC
Bobby Ross	Fly-half	29 August 1969 (aged 25)	5	(Canada) James Bay A.A.
Steve Gray	Centre	19 July 1963 (aged 31)	29	(Canada) Vancouver Kats R.C.
Christian Stewart	Centre	17 October 1966 (aged 28)	11	(South Africa) Western Province
David Lougheed	Centre	11 April 1968 (aged 27)	14	(Canada) Toronto Welsh R.F.C.
Ron Toews	Wing	28 April 1969 (aged 26)	9	(Canada) Meraloma Rugby
Shawn Lytton	Wing	6 August 1968 (aged 26)	2	(Canada) Meraloma Rugby
Winston Stanley	Wing	17 July 1974 (aged 20)	5	(Canada) UBC Old Boys Ravens
Scott Stewart	Fullback	16 January 1969 (aged 26)	21	(Canada) UBC Old Boys Ravens

=== Romania ===
Head coaches: (Romania) Mircea Paraschiv / (Romania) Constantin Fugigi

Note: Flags indicate national union for the club/province as defined by World Rugby.

Player	Position	Date of birth (age)	Caps	Club/province
Ionel Negreci	Hooker	13 December 1970 (aged 24)	3	(Romania) RCJ Farul Constanța
Valere Tufă	Hooker	8 July 1965 (aged 29)	9	(Romania) CSA Steaua București
Vasile Lucaci	Prop	5 January 1969 (aged 26)	0	(Romania) CSM Baia Mare
Gabriel Vlad	Prop	9 April 1969 (aged 26)	18	(Romania) RC Grivița
Leodor Costea	Prop	10 December 1967 (aged 27)	5	(Romania) RCJ Farul Constanța
Gheorghe Leonte	Prop	12 February 1963 (aged 32)	54	(France) CS Vienne
Constantin Cojocariu	Lock	27 June 1965 (aged 29)	33	(France) Aviron Bayonnais
Sandu Ciorăscu	Lock	11 September 1966 (aged 28)	34	(France) FC Auch Gers
Ovidiu Slușariuc	Lock	7 February 1968 (aged 27)	3	(Romania) CSA Dinamo București
Traian Oroian	Flanker	25 December 1965 (aged 29)	25	(Romania) CSA Steaua București
Alexandru Gealapu	Flanker	19 February 1972 (aged 23)	6	(Romania) CSA Steaua București
Andrei Gurănescu	Flanker	24 July 1967 (aged 27)	12	(Romania) CS Dinamo București
Cătălin Drăguceanu	Flanker	19 November 1970 (aged 24)	9	(Romania) CSA Steaua București
Tiberiu Brînză (c)	Number 8	21 September 1968 (aged 26)	20	(Romania) CS Universitatea Cluj-Napoca
Daniel Neaga	Scrum-half	5 November 1965 (aged 29)	38	(Romania) CS Dinamo București
Vasile Flutur	Scrum-half	22 June 1969 (aged 25)	3	(Romania) CS Universitatea Cluj-Napoca
Ilie Ivanciuc	Fly-half	26 July 1971 (aged 23)	3	(Romania) CSM Bucovina Suceava
Neculai Nichitean	Fly-half	27 September 1969 (aged 25)	26	(Romania) CS Universitatea Cluj-Napoca
Nicolae Răcean	Centre	29 November 1963 (aged 31)	36	(Romania) CS Universitatea Cluj-Napoca
Romeo Gontineac	Centre	18 December 1973 (aged 21)	4	(Romania) CS Universitatea Cluj-Napoca
Adrian Lungu	Centre	5 September 1960 (aged 34)	75	(France) Castres Olympique
Radu Fugigi	Wing	29 November 1973 (aged 21)	0	(Romania) CSM Sibiu
Gheorghe Solomie	Wing	5 March 1969 (aged 26)	19	(Romania) Universitatea Timișoara
Ionel Rotaru	Wing	14 September 1973 (aged 21)	1	(Romania) CS Dinamo București
Lucian Colceriu	Wing	8 September 1968 (aged 26)	15	(Romania) CSA Steaua București
Vasile Brici	Fullback	20 June 1970 (aged 24)	19	(Romania) RCJ Farul Constanța

=== South Africa ===
James Dalton and Pieter Hendriks were banned from the tournament for fighting in their pool match against Canada and were replaced by Naka Drotské and Chester Williams respectively.

Head coach: (South Africa) Kitch Christie

Note: Flags indicate national union for the club/province as defined by World Rugby.

Player	Position	Date of birth (age)	Caps	Club/province
Chris Rossouw	Hooker	14 September 1969 (aged 25)	1	(South Africa) Transvaal
James Dalton	Hooker	10 August 1972 (aged 22)	1	(South Africa) Transvaal
Naka Drotské	Hooker	15 March 1971 (aged 24)	1	(South Africa) Orange Free State
Os du Randt	Prop	8 September 1972 (aged 22)	5	(South Africa) Orange Free State
Balie Swart	Prop	18 May 1964 (aged 31)	10	(South Africa) Transvaal
Marius Hurter	Prop	8 October 1970 (aged 24)	0	(South Africa) Western Province
Garry Pagel	Prop	17 September 1966 (aged 28)	0	(South Africa) Western Province
Mark Andrews	Lock	21 February 1972 (aged 23)	9	(South Africa) Natal
Kobus Wiese	Lock	16 May 1964 (aged 31)	2	(South Africa) Transvaal
Hannes Strydom	Lock	13 July 1965 (aged 29)	7	(South Africa) Transvaal
Krynauw Otto	Lock	8 October 1971 (aged 23)	0	(South Africa) Northern Transvaal
Francois Pienaar (c)	Flanker	2 January 1967 (aged 28)	6	(South Africa) Transvaal
Ruben Kruger	Flanker	30 March 1970 (aged 25)	5	(South Africa) Northern Transvaal
Robby Brink	Flanker	21 July 1971 (aged 23)	0	(South Africa) Western Province
Rudolf Straeuli	Number 8	20 August 1963 (aged 31)	16	(South Africa) Transvaal
Gary Teichmann	Number 8	9 January 1967 (aged 28)	0	(South Africa) Natal
Adriaan Richter	Number 8	10 May 1966 (aged 29)	7	(South Africa) Northern Transvaal
Joost van der Westhuizen	Scrum-half	20 February 1971 (aged 24)	8	(South Africa) Northern Transvaal
Johan Roux	Scrum-half	25 February 1969 (aged 26)	5	(South Africa) Transvaal
Joel Stransky	Fly-half	16 July 1967 (aged 27)	7	(South Africa) Western Province
Hennie le Roux	Centre	10 July 1967 (aged 27)	11	(South Africa) Transvaal
Japie Mulder	Centre	18 October 1969 (aged 25)	5	(South Africa) Transvaal
Brendan Venter	Centre	29 December 1969 (aged 25)	7	(South Africa) Orange Free State
Christiaan Scholtz	Centre	22 October 1970 (aged 24)	1	(South Africa) Transvaal
Pieter Hendriks	Wing	13 April 1970 (aged 25)	4	(South Africa) Transvaal
Chester Williams	Wing	8 August 1970 (aged 24)	11	(South Africa) Western Province
James Small	Wing	10 February 1969 (aged 26)	19	(South Africa) Natal
Andre Joubert	Fullback	15 April 1964 (aged 31)	11	(South Africa) Natal
Gavin Johnson	Fullback	17 October 1966 (aged 28)	4	(South Africa) Transvaal

== Pool B ==
=== Argentina ===
Head coaches: (Argentina) Alejandro Petra and (Argentina) Ricardo Paganini

Note: Flags indicate national union for the club/province as defined by World Rugby.

Player	Position	Date of birth (age)	Caps	Club/province
Federico Méndez	Hooker	2 August 1972 (aged 22)	21	(Argentina) Mendoza RC
Ricardo Le Fort	Hooker	13 October 1965 (aged 29)	14	(Argentina) Tucumán RC
Matias Corral	Prop	10 August 1968 (aged 26)	14	(Argentina) San Isidro
Marcelo Urbano	Prop	2 October 1965 (aged 29)	2	(Argentina) Buenos Aires
Roberto Diego Grau	Prop	16 July 1970 (aged 24)	3	(Argentina) Liceo Mendoza
Patricio Noriega	Prop	22 October 1971 (aged 23)	22	(Argentina) Hindú
Germán Llanes	Lock	27 May 1968 (aged 26)	24	(Argentina) La Plata
Pedro Sporleder	Lock	2 January 1971 (aged 24)	31	(Argentina) Curupaytí
Nicolás Bossicovich	Lock	27 June 1969 (aged 25)	2	(Argentina) Gimnasia y Esgrima Rosario
Pablo Buabse	Lock	27 March 1963 (aged 32)	7	(Argentina) Los Tarcos
Rolando Martín	Flanker	23 September 1968 (aged 26)	9	(Argentina) San Isidro
Cristián Viel	Flanker	4 November 1967 (aged 27)	14	(Argentina) Club Newman
Agustín Macome	Flanker	23 June 1967 (aged 27)	4	(Argentina) Tucumán RC
Martín Sugasti	Flanker	9 October 1967 (aged 27)	0	(Argentina) Jockey Club
Sebastián Irazoqui	Number 8	22 May 1969 (aged 26)	4	(Argentina) Palermo Bajo
José Santamarina	Number 8	21 May 1963 (aged 32)	17	(Argentina) Tucumán RC
Agustín Pichot	Scrum-half	22 August 1974 (aged 20)	0	(Argentina) CASI
Rodrigo Crexell	Scrum-half	5 February 1968 (aged 27)	8	(Argentina) CA Rosario
Gonzalo Camardón	Scrum-half	19 December 1970 (aged 24)	17	(Argentina) Alumni
Guillermo del Castillo	Fly-half	14 December 1963 (aged 31)	15	(Argentina) Jockey Club
José Cilley	Fly-half	28 December 1972 (aged 22)	1	(Argentina) San Isidro
Lisandro Arbizu	Fly-half	29 September 1971 (aged 23)	25	(Argentina) Belgrano
Fernando del Castillo	Centre	16 January 1971 (aged 24)	1	(Argentina) Jockey Club
Francisco García	Centre	30 October 1970 (aged 24)	4	(Argentina) Alumni
Diego Cuesta Silva	Wing	23 January 1963 (aged 32)	58	(Argentina) San Isidro
Martín Terán	Wing	25 July 1969 (aged 25)	23	(Argentina) Tucumán RC
Diego Albanese	Wing	17 September 1973 (aged 21)	2	(Argentina) San Isidro
Ezequiel Jurado	Fullback	17 April 1973 (aged 22)	2	(Argentina) Jockey Club
Sebastián Salvat (c)	Fullback	5 April 1967 (aged 28)	28	(Argentina) Alumni
Santiago Mesón	Fullback	25 January 1968 (aged 27)	31	(Argentina) San Isidro

=== England ===
Head coach: (England) Jack Rowell

Note: Flags indicate national union for the club/province as defined by World Rugby.

Player	Position	Date of birth (age)	Caps	Club/province
Brian Moore	Hooker	11 January 1962 (aged 33)	63	(England) Harlequins
Graham Dawe	Hooker	4 September 1959 (aged 35)	4	(England) Bath
Jason Leonard	Prop	14 August 1968 (aged 26)	40	(England) Harlequins
Graham Rowntree	Prop	18 April 1971 (aged 24)	1	(England) Leicester
Victor Ubogu	Prop	8 September 1964 (aged 30)	15	(England) Bath
John Mallett	Prop	28 May 1970 (aged 24)	0	(England) Bath
Martin Bayfield	Lock	21 December 1966 (aged 28)	25	(England) Northampton
Martin Johnson	Lock	9 March 1970 (aged 25)	14	(England) Leicester
Richard West	Lock	20 March 1971 (aged 24)	0	(England) Gloucester
Tim Rodber	Flanker	2 July 1969 (aged 25)	14	(England) Northampton
Steve Ojomoh	Flanker	25 May 1970 (aged 25)	6	(England) Bath
Neil Back	Flanker	16 January 1969 (aged 26)	2	(England) Leicester
Dean Richards	Number 8	11 July 1963 (aged 31)	48	(England) Leicester
Ben Clarke	Number 8	15 April 1968 (aged 27)	21	(England) Bath
Kyran Bracken	Scrum-half	22 November 1971 (aged 23)	8	(England) Bristol
Dewi Morris	Scrum-half	9 February 1964 (aged 31)	24	(England) Orrell
Rob Andrew	Fly-half	18 February 1963 (aged 32)	70	(England) Wasps
Will Carling (c)	Centre	12 December 1965 (aged 29)	56	(England) Harlequins
Jeremy Guscott	Centre	7 July 1965 (aged 29)	39	(England) Bath
Phil de Glanville	Centre	1 October 1968 (aged 26)	10	(England) Bath
Damian Hopley	Centre	12 April 1970 (aged 25)	0	(England) Wasps
Tony Underwood	Wing	17 February 1969 (aged 26)	16	(England) Leicester
Rory Underwood	Wing	19 June 1963 (aged 31)	79	(England) Leicester
Ian Hunter	Wing	15 February 1969 (aged 26)	5	(England) Northampton
Mike Catt	Fullback	17 September 1971 (aged 23)	6	(England) Bath
Jonathan Callard	Fullback	1 January 1966 (aged 29)	3	(England) Bath

=== Italy ===
Head coach: (France) Georges Coste

Note: Flags indicate national union for the club/province as defined by World Rugby.

Player	Position	Date of birth (age)	Caps	Club/province
Moreno Trevisiol	Hooker	29 April 1963 (aged 32)	8	(Italy) Benetton Rugby
Carlo Orlandi	Hooker	1 November 1967 (aged 27)	17	(Italy) Amatori Milano
Massimo Cuttitta (c)	Prop	2 September 1966 (aged 28)	38	(Italy) Amatori Milano
Franco Properzi	Prop	4 November 1965 (aged 29)	26	(Italy) Amatori Milano
Giovanni Grespan	Prop	21 January 1967 (aged 28)	20	(Italy) Benetton Rugby
Mauro Dal Sie	Prop	13 October 1967 (aged 27)	4	(Italy) Rugby San Donà
Andrea Castellani	Prop	15 May 1972 (aged 23)	1	(Italy) L'Aquila Rugby
Roberto Favaro	Lock	9 February 1965 (aged 30)	40	(Italy) Benetton Rugby
Mark Giacheri	Lock	1 February 1969 (aged 26)	16	(Italy) Benetton Rugby
Pierpaolo Pedroni	Lock	20 May 1964 (aged 31)	15	(Italy) Amatori Milano
Giambattista Croci	Lock	28 July 1965 (aged 29)	14	(Italy) Amatori Milano
Diego Scaglia	Lock	29 July 1967 (aged 27)	3	(Italy) Benetton Rugby
Orazio Arancio	Flanker	15 November 1967 (aged 27)	10	(Italy) Benetton Rugby
Andrea Sgorlon	Flanker	20 January 1968 (aged 27)	11	(Italy) Benetton Rugby
Massimo Giovanelli	Flanker	1 March 1967 (aged 28)	28	(Italy) Amatori Milano
Massimiliano Capuzzoni	Flanker	17 April 1969 (aged 26)	2	(Italy) Amatori Milano
Carlo Checchinato	Number 8	30 August 1970 (aged 24)	25	(Italy) Benetton Rugby
Julian Gardner	Number 8	12 May 1964 (aged 31)	10	(Italy) Benetton Rugby
Alessandro Troncon	Scrum-half	6 September 1973 (aged 21)	11	(Italy) Benetton Rugby
Ivan Francescato	Scrum-half	10 February 1967 (aged 28)	19	(Italy) Benetton Rugby
Diego Domínguez	Fly-half	25 April 1966 (aged 29)	23	(Italy) Amatori Milano
Francesco Mazzariol	Fly-half	1 March 1975 (aged 20)	0	(Italy) Benetton Rugby
Piermassimiliano Dotto	Fly-half	28 February 1970 (aged 25)	4	(Italy) Benetton Rugby
Massimo Bonomi	Centre	22 June 1967 (aged 27)	29	(Italy) Amatori Milano
Stefano Bordon	Centre	2 February 1968 (aged 27)	18	(Italy) Piacenza Rugby Club
Paolo Vaccari	Centre	17 January 1971 (aged 24)	27	(Italy) Amatori Milano
Marco Platania	Centre	6 May 1973 (aged 22)	1	(Italy) Amatori Milano
Massimo Ravazzolo	Wing	5 September 1972 (aged 22)	11	(Italy) Rugby Calvisano
Marcello Cuttitta	Wing	2 September 1966 (aged 28)	40	(Italy) Amatori Milano
Mario Gerosa	Wing	27 April 1967 (aged 28)	5	(Italy) Piacenza Rugby Club
Luigi Troiani	Fullback	25 February 1964 (aged 31)	45	(Italy) L'Aquila Rugby

=== Western Samoa ===
Head coach: (Samoa) Peter Schuster

Note: Flags indicate national union for the club/province as defined by World Rugby.

Player	Position	Date of birth (age)	Caps	Club/province
Tala Leiasamaivao	Hooker	12 June 1967 (aged 27)	6	(Samoa) Moata'a Rugby Club
Peter Fatialofa (c)	Prop	26 April 1959 (aged 36)	23	(New Zealand) Ponsonby RFC / Counties Manukau RFU
George Latu	Prop	1 January 1965 (aged 30)	5	(Samoa) Vaimoso Rugby Club
Michael Mika	Prop	24 July 1968 (aged 26)	1	(New Zealand) Kaikorai/Otago RFU
Brendan Reidy	Prop	13 September 1968 (aged 26)	0	(New Zealand) Marist St. Pats/Wellington RFU
Potu Leavasa	Lock	27 November 1971 (aged 23)	2	(Samoa) Apia Rugby Club
Saini Lemamea	Lock	14 July 1964 (aged 30)	9	(Samoa) SCOPA Rugby
Daryl Williams	Lock	30 September 1964 (aged 30)	3	(France) Colomiers
Lio Falaniko	Lock	17 September 1970 (aged 24)	8	(Samoa) Marist St. Joseph
Malaki Iupeli	Flanker	23 November 1965 (aged 29)	15	(Samoa) Marist St. Joseph
Sam Kaleta	Flanker	9 March 1966 (aged 29)	6	(New Zealand) Ponsonby RFC
Sila Vaifale	Flanker	5 July 1967 (aged 27)	19	(Samoa) Marist St. Joseph
Junior Paramore	Flanker	18 November 1968 (aged 26)	6	(New Zealand) Counties Manukau RFU
Shem Tatupu	Flanker	18 February 1968 (aged 27)	4	(New Zealand) Auckland Rugby Union
Pat Lam	Number 8	29 September 1968 (aged 26)	7	(New Zealand) Auckland Rugby Union
Tu Nu'uali'itia	Scrum-half	12 June 1971 (aged 23)	3	(New Zealand) Te Atatū/Auckland Rugby Union
Va'apu'u Vitale	Scrum-half	4 December 1970 (aged 24)	3	(Samoa) Vaiala Rugby Club
Esera Puleitu	Fly-half	15 November 1975 (aged 19)	1	(New Zealand) Marist Brothers Old Boys RFC
Darren Kellett	Fly-half	27 September 1972 (aged 22)	7	(New Zealand) Auckland Rugby Union
Tupo Fa'amasino	Centre	13 April 1966 (aged 29)	11	(New Zealand) Wellington RFU
George Harder	Centre	22 June 1974 (aged 20)	1	(New Zealand) Auckland Rugby Union
To'o Vaega	Centre	17 August 1965 (aged 29)	26	(New Zealand) Southland Rugby Union
George Leaupepe	Centre	2 April 1975 (aged 20)	1	(New Zealand) Counties Manukau RFU
Brian Lima	Wing	25 January 1972 (aged 23)	14	(Samoa) Marist St. Joseph
Fereti Tuilagi	Wing	9 June 1971 (aged 23)	5	(Samoa) Marist St. Joseph
Fata Sini	Wing	24 December 1966 (aged 28)	1	(New Zealand) Auckland Rugby Union
Mike Umaga	Fullback	19 February 1966 (aged 29)	1	(New Zealand) Wellington RFU

== Pool C ==
=== Ireland ===
Head coach: (Ireland) Gerry Murphy

Note: Flags indicate national union for the club/province as defined by World Rugby.

Player	Position	Date of birth (age)	Caps	Club/province
Terry Kingston (c)	Hooker	19 September 1963 (aged 31)	22	(Ireland) Dolphin RFC / Munster Rugby
Keith Wood	Hooker	27 January 1972 (aged 23)	5	(Ireland) Garryowen FC / Munster Rugby
Nick Popplewell	Prop	6 April 1964 (aged 31)	29	(Ireland) Greystones RFC / Leinster Rugby
John Fitzgerald	Prop	31 August 1961 (aged 33)	12	(Ireland) Young Munster / Munster Rugby
Gary Halpin	Prop	14 February 1966 (aged 29)	8	(England) London Irish RFC / Irish Exiles
Paul Wallace	Prop	30 December 1971 (aged 23)	0	(Ireland) Blackrock College RFC / Leinster Rugby
Neil Francis	Lock	17 March 1964 (aged 31)	29	(Ireland) Old Belvedere RFC / Leinster Rugby
Gabriel Fulcher	Lock	27 November 1969 (aged 25)	7	(Ireland) Cork Constitution / Munster Rugby
Davy Tweed	Lock	13 November 1959 (aged 35)	3	(Ireland) Ballymena R.F.C. / Ulster Rugby
Paddy Johns	Lock	19 February 1968 (aged 27)	20	(Ireland) Dungannon RFC / Ulster Rugby
Eddie Halvey	Flanker	11 August 1970 (aged 24)	3	(Ireland) Shannon RFC / Munster Rugby
Denis McBride	Flanker	9 September 1964 (aged 30)	19	(Ireland) Malone RFC / Ulster Rugby
David Corkery	Flanker	6 November 1972 (aged 22)	4	(Ireland) Cork Constitution / Munster Rugby
Anthony Foley	Number 8	30 October 1973 (aged 21)	5	(Ireland) Shannon RFC / Munster Rugby
Niall Hogan	Scrum-half	20 April 1971 (aged 24)	2	(Ireland) Terenure College RFC / Leinster Rugby
Michael Bradley	Scrum-half	17 November 1962 (aged 32)	39	(Ireland) Cork Constitution / Munster Rugby
Eric Elwood	Fly-half	26 February 1969 (aged 26)	11	(Ireland) Lansdowne FC / Connacht Rugby
Paul Burke	Fly-half	1 May 1973 (aged 22)	4	(Ireland) Cork Constitution / Munster Rugby
Brendan Mullin	Centre	30 October 1963 (aged 31)	52	(Ireland) Blackrock College RFC / Leinster Rugby
Jonny Bell	Centre	7 February 1974 (aged 21)	5	(Ireland) Ballymena R.F.C. / Ulster Rugby
Maurice Field	Centre	24 February 1964 (aged 31)	6	(Ireland) Malone RFC / Ulster Rugby
Simon Geoghegan	Wing	1 September 1968 (aged 26)	28	(England) Bath Rugby / Irish Exiles
Richard Wallace	Wing	16 January 1968 (aged 27)	17	(Ireland) Garryowen FC / Munster Rugby
Darragh O'Mahony	Wing	18 August 1972 (aged 22)	1	(Ireland) U.C.D. / Leinster Rugby
Jim Staples	Fullback	20 October 1965 (aged 29)	17	(England) Harlequins FC / Irish Exiles
Conor O'Shea	Fullback	21 October 1970 (aged 24)	10	(Ireland) Lansdowne FC / Leinster Rugby

=== Japan ===
Head coach: (Japan) Osamu Koyabu

Note: Flags indicate national union for the club/province as defined by World Rugby.

Player	Position	Date of birth (age)	Caps	Club/province
Masahiro Kunda (c)	Hooker	29 September 1966 (aged 28)	18	(Japan) Toshiba Fuchu
Eiji Hirotsu	Hooker	24 November 1967 (aged 27)	1	(Japan) Kobe Steel
Osamu Ota	Prop	23 March 1965 (aged 30)	24	(Japan) NEC
Kazuaki Takahashi	Prop	31 January 1968 (aged 27)	14	(Japan) Toyota Motors
Masanori Takura	Prop	30 September 1966 (aged 28)	15	(Japan) Mitsubishi Heavy Industries Sagamigahara
Kazu Hamabe	Prop	31 May 1971 (aged 23)	0	(Japan) Kintetsu
Yoshihiko Sakuraba	Lock	22 September 1966 (aged 28)	17	(Japan) Nippon Steel Kamaishi
Bruce Ferguson	Lock	25 July 1969 (aged 25)	8	(Japan) Hino Motors
Takashi Akatsuka	Lock	8 September 1973 (aged 21)	2	(Japan) Kubota
Tomoya Haneda	Flanker	21 December 1965 (aged 29)	1	(Japan) World Co.
Hiroyuki Kajihara	Flanker	28 September 1966 (aged 28)	20	(Japan) Katsunuma Club
Ko Izawa	Flanker	16 July 1970 (aged 24)	2	(Japan) Daito Bunka University
Sione Latu	Number 8	23 February 1971 (aged 24)	7	(Japan) Daito Bunka University
Sinali Latu	Number 8	22 August 1965 (aged 29)	31	(Japan) Sanyo Electric
Masami Horikoshi	Scrum-half	27 November 1968 (aged 26)	19	(Japan) Kobe Steel
Wataru Murata	Scrum-half	25 January 1968 (aged 27)	3	(Japan) Kobe Steel
Katsuhiro Matsuo	Fly-half	6 January 1964 (aged 31)	23	(Japan) World Co.
Keiji Hirose	Fly-half	16 April 1973 (aged 22)	2	(Japan) Kyoto Sangyo University
Seiji Hirao	Centre	21 January 1963 (aged 32)	33	(Japan) Kobe Steel
Akira Yoshida	Centre	13 August 1971 (aged 23)	1	(Japan) Kobe Steel
Yukio Motoki	Centre	27 August 1971 (aged 23)	12	(Japan) Kobe Steel
Tsutomu Matsuda	Wing	30 April 1970 (aged 25)	7	(Japan) Toshiba Fuchu
Terunori Masuho	Wing	29 January 1972 (aged 23)	12	(Japan) Kobe Steel
Lopeti Oto	Wing	2 November 1971 (aged 23)	3	(Japan) Daito Bunka University
Yoshihito Yoshida	Wing	18 February 1969 (aged 26)	27	(Japan) Isetan RFC
Kiyoshi Imazumi	Fullback	13 September 1967 (aged 27)	3	(Japan) Suntory RFC

=== New Zealand ===
Head coach: (New Zealand) Laurie Mains Manager: (New Zealand) Colin Meads

Note: Flags indicate national union for the club/province as defined by World Rugby.

Player	Position	Date of birth (age)	Caps	Club/province
Sean Fitzpatrick (c)	Hooker	4 June 1963 (aged 31)	63	(New Zealand) Auckland RFU
Norm Hewitt	Hooker	11 November 1968 (aged 26)	0	(New Zealand) Southland RFU
Craig Dowd	Prop	17 December 1963 (aged 31)	9	(New Zealand) Auckland RFU
Olo Brown	Prop	24 October 1967 (aged 27)	18	(New Zealand) Auckland RFU
Richard Loe	Prop	6 April 1960 (aged 35)	44	(New Zealand) Canterbury RFU
Blair Larsen	Lock	20 January 1969 (aged 26)	9	(New Zealand) North Harbour RFU
Ian Jones	Lock	17 April 1967 (aged 28)	38	(New Zealand) North Harbour RFU
Robin Brooke	Lock	10 December 1966 (aged 28)	13	(New Zealand) Auckland RFU
Kevin Schuler	Flanker	11 March 1967 (aged 28)	2	(New Zealand) North Harbour RFU
Mike Brewer	Flanker	6 November 1964 (aged 30)	26	(New Zealand) Canterbury RFU
Jamie Joseph	Flanker	21 November 1969 (aged 25)	15	(New Zealand) Otago RFU
Paul Henderson	Flanker	21 September 1964 (aged 30)	6	(New Zealand) Southland RFU
Josh Kronfeld	Flanker	20 June 1971 (aged 23)	1	(New Zealand) Otago RFU
Zinzan Brooke	Number 8	14 February 1965 (aged 30)	28	(New Zealand) Auckland RFU
Graeme Bachop	Half-back	11 June 1967 (aged 27)	24	(New Zealand) Canterbury RFU
Ant Strachan	Half-back	7 June 1966 (aged 28)	9	(New Zealand) North Harbour RFU
Andrew Mehrtens	First five-eighth	28 April 1973 (aged 22)	1	(New Zealand) Canterbury RFU
Simon Culhane	First five-eighth	10 March 1968 (aged 27)	0	(New Zealand) Southland RFU
Frank Bunce	Centre	4 February 1962 (aged 33)	23	(New Zealand) North Harbour RFU
Walter Little	Centre	14 October 1969 (aged 25)	26	(New Zealand) North Harbour RFU
Alama Ieremia	Centre	27 October 1970 (aged 24)	3	(New Zealand) Wellington RFU
Eric Rush	Wing	11 February 1965 (aged 30)	0	(New Zealand) North Harbour RFU
Jeff Wilson	Wing	24 October 1973 (aged 21)	4	(New Zealand) Otago RFU
Marc Ellis	Wing	8 October 1971 (aged 23)	3	(New Zealand) Otago RFU
Jonah Lomu	Wing	12 May 1975 (aged 20)	2	(New Zealand) Counties Manukau RFU
Glen Osborne	Fullback	27 August 1971 (aged 23)	1	(New Zealand) North Harbour RFU

=== Wales ===
Head coach: (Australia) Alec Evans

Note: Flags indicate national union for the club/province as defined by World Rugby.

Player	Position	Date of birth (age)	Caps	Club/province
Jonathan Humphreys	Hooker	27 February 1969 (aged 26)	0	(Wales) Cardiff RFC
Garin Jenkins	Hooker	18 August 1966 (aged 28)	26	(Wales) Swansea RFC
John Davies	Prop	1 February 1969 (aged 26)	19	(Wales) Neath RFC
Ricky Evans	Prop	23 June 1960 (aged 34)	17	(Wales) Llanelli RFC
Mike Griffiths	Prop	18 March 1962 (aged 33)	32	(Wales) Cardiff RFC
Spencer John	Prop	19 October 1973 (aged 21)	2	(Wales) Llanelli RFC
Derwyn Jones	Lock	14 November 1970 (aged 24)	4	(Wales) Cardiff RFC
Greg Prosser	Lock	21 May 1966 (aged 29)	0	(Wales) Pontypridd RFC
Stuart Roy	Lock	25 December 1968 (aged 26)	0	(Wales) Cardiff RFC
Gareth Llewellyn	Flanker	27 February 1969 (aged 26)	37	(Wales) Neath RFC
Hemi Taylor	Flanker	17 December 1963 (aged 31)	10	(Wales) Cardiff RFC
Mark Bennett	Flanker	26 January 1969 (aged 26)	0	(Wales) Cardiff RFC
Emyr Lewis (rugby union)	Number 8	29 August 1968 (aged 26)	34	(Wales) Cardiff RFC
Stuart Davies	Number 8	2 September 1965 (aged 29)	13	(Wales) Swansea RFC
Robert Jones	Scrum-half	10 November 1969 (aged 25)	52	(Wales) Swansea RFC
Andy Moore	Scrum-half	6 September 1968 (aged 26)	0	(Wales) Cardiff RFC
Adrian Davies	Fly-half	9 February 1969 (aged 26)	7	(Wales) Cardiff RFC
David Wyn Evans	Fly-half	1 November 1965 (aged 29)	11	(Wales) Treorchy RFC
Mike Hall (c)	Centre	13 October 1965 (aged 29)	39	(Wales) Cardiff RFC
Neil Jenkins	Centre	18 August 1966 (aged 28)	33	(Wales) Pontypridd RFC
Gareth Thomas	Centre	25 July 1974 (aged 20)	0	(Wales) Bridgend RFC
Ieuan Evans	Wing	21 March 1964 (aged 31)	57	(Wales) Llanelli RFC
Steve Ford	Wing	15 August 1965 (aged 29)	8	(Wales) Cardiff RFC
Wayne Proctor	Wing	12 June 1972 (aged 22)	16	(Wales) Llanelli RFC
Justin Thomas	Fullback	1 November 1973 (aged 21)	0	(Wales) UWIC
Tony Clement	Fullback	8 February 1967 (aged 28)	34	(Wales) Swansea RFC

== Pool D ==
=== France ===
Head coach: (France) Pierre Berbizier

Note: Flags indicate national union for the club/province as defined by World Rugby.

Player	Position	Date of birth (age)	Caps	Club/province
Jean-Michel Gonzalez	Hooker	10 July 1967 (aged 27)	24	(France) Bayonne
Marc de Rougemont	Hooker	24 May 1972 (aged 23)	2	(France) Toulon
Louis Armary	Prop	24 July 1963 (aged 31)	44	(France) FC Lourdes
Christian Califano	Prop	16 May 1972 (aged 23)	7	(France) Toulouse
Philippe Gallart	Prop	18 December 1962 (aged 32)	17	(France) Béziers
Laurent Benezech	Prop	19 December 1966 (aged 28)	8	Racing Club de France
Olivier Roumat	Lock	10 June 1966 (aged 28)	50	(France) Dax
Olivier Brouzet	Lock	22 November 1972 (aged 22)	6	(France) Grenoble
Olivier Merle	Lock	14 November 1965 (aged 29)	16	(France) Montferrand
Abdelatif Benazzi	Lock	20 August 1968 (aged 26)	32	(France) Agen
Philippe Benetton	Flanker	18 May 1968 (aged 27)	29	(France) Agen
Laurent Cabannes	Flanker	6 February 1964 (aged 31)	35	Racing Club de France
Arnaud Costes	Flanker	16 June 1973 (aged 21)	2	(France) Montferrand
Marc Cécillon	Number 8	30 July 1959 (aged 35)	42	(France) Bourgoin-Jallieu
Albert Cigagna	Number 8	25 September 1960 (aged 34)	0	(France) Toulouse
Guy Accoceberry	Scrum-half	5 May 1967 (aged 28)	8	(France) Bordeaux-Bègles
Fabien Galthié	Scrum-half	20 March 1969 (aged 26)	14	(France) Colomiers
Christophe Deylaud	Fly-half	2 October 1964 (aged 30)	10	(France) Toulouse
Yann Delaigue	Fly-half	5 April 1973 (aged 22)	5	(France) Toulon
Thierry Lacroix	Fly-half	2 March 1967 (aged 28)	29	(France) Dax
Sébastien Viars	Centre	24 June 1971 (aged 23)	13	(France) Brive
Philippe Sella	Centre	14 February 1962 (aged 33)	106	(France) Agen
Franck Mesnel	Centre	30 June 1961 (aged 33)	54	Racing Club de France
Philippe Saint-André (c)	Wing	19 April 1967 (aged 28)	44	(France) Montferrand
Émile Ntamack	Wing	25 June 1970 (aged 24)	8	(France) Toulouse
William Téchoueyres	Wing	12 February 1966 (aged 29)	2	(France) Bordeaux-Bègles
Jean-Luc Sadourny	Fullback	26 August 1966 (aged 28)	28	(France) Colomiers

=== Ivory Coast ===
Head coach: (Ivory Coast) Claude Ezoua

Note: Flags indicate national union for the club/province as defined by World Rugby.

Player	Position	Date of birth (age)	Caps	Club/province
Édouard Angoran	Hooker	6 May 1970 (aged 25)	3	(France) Stade Rodez Aveyron
Achille Niamien	Hooker	12 May 1967 (aged 28)	3	(Ivory Coast) Bouake RC
Ernest Bley	Prop	7 November 1968 (aged 26)	5	(Ivory Coast) ASPAA
Toussaint Djehi	Prop	1 November 1962 (aged 32)	5	(France) SO Millau
Jean-Pascal Ezoua	Prop	3 March 1964 (aged 31)	0	(Ivory Coast) ASPAA
Daniel Quansah	Prop	24 November 1966 (aged 28)	0	(France) RC USAP84
Ble Aka	Lock	19 January 1975 (aged 20)	5	(Ivory Coast) Burotic Abidjan RC
Gilbert Bado	Lock	29 September 1963 (aged 31)	0	(France) Rugby US Cognac
Amidou Koné	Lock	20 October 1965 (aged 29)	5	(Ivory Coast) Burotic Abidjan RC
Soumaïla Koné	Lock	22 December 1965 (aged 29)	0	(France) ASS Soustons Rugby
Patrice Pere	Flanker	14 February 1969 (aged 26)	0	(France) ACBB Paris Rugby
Alfred Okou	Flanker	3 September 1963 (aged 31)	4	(France) Stade Poitevin Rugby
Ismaila Lassissi	Flanker	11 September 1969 (aged 25)	5	(Ivory Coast) Burotic Abidjan RC
Djakaria Sanoko	Number 8	4 May 1964 (aged 31)	0	(France) Biarritz Olympique
Félix Dago	Scrum-half	5 January 1968 (aged 27)	2	unknown
Frédéric Dupont	Scrum-half	2 May 1967 (aged 28)	0	(France) RC Nîmes
Aboubakar Camara	Fly-half	26 December 1965 (aged 29)	4	(Ivory Coast) ASPAA
Athanase Dali (c)	Fly-half	9 September 1967 (aged 27)	5	(France) Clamart Rugby 92
Thierry Kouame	Centre	2 July 1966 (aged 28)	5	(Ivory Coast) ASPAA
Lucien Niakou	Centre	25 April 1964 (aged 31)	5	(France) Stade Niortais
Jean-Baptiste Sathiq	Centre	6 June 1966 (aged 28)	5	(Ivory Coast) CASGI
Aboubacar Soulama	Wing	1974 (21 years)	2	(Ivory Coast) Burotic Abidjan RC
Paulin Bouazo	Wing	18 February 1968 (aged 27)	4	(Ivory Coast) Burotic Abidjan RC
Max Brito	Wing	8 April 1971 (aged 24)	0	(France) Biscarrosse Olympique
Célestin N'Gbala	Wing	18 May 1971 (aged 24)	3	(France) Cahors Rugby
Victor Kouassi	Fullback	20 July 1971 (aged 23)	1	(Ivory Coast) Burotic Abidjan RC

=== Scotland ===
Head coach: Jim Telfer

Note: Flags indicate national union for the club/province as defined by World Rugby.

Player	Position	Date of birth (age)	Caps	Club/province
Kenny Milne	Hooker	1 December 1961 (aged 33)	36	(Scotland) Heriot's RC
Kevin McKenzie	Hooker	22 January 1968 (aged 27)	3	(Scotland) Stirling County RFC
Dave Hilton	Prop	3 April 1970 (aged 25)	6	(England) Bath Rugby
John Manson	Prop	22 June 1968 (aged 26)	1	(Scotland) Dundee HSFP
Peter Wright	Prop	30 December 1967 (aged 27)	12	(Scotland) Boroughmuir RFC
Paul Burnell	Prop	29 September 1965 (aged 29)	37	(England) London Scottish F.C.
Stewart Campbell	Lock	7 November 1972 (aged 22)	6	(Scotland) Dundee HSFP
Damian Cronin	Lock	17 April 1963 (aged 32)	32	(France) Bourges
Jeremy Richardson	Lock	7 September 1963 (aged 31)	1	(Scotland) Edinburgh Academicals
Doddie Weir	Lock	4 July 1970 (aged 24)	28	(Scotland) Melrose RFC
Rob Wainwright	Flanker	22 March 1965 (aged 30)	13	(England) West Hartlepool RFC
Peter Walton	Flanker	3 June 1969 (aged 25)	5	(England) Northampton Saints
Ian Morrison	Flanker	14 December 1962 (aged 32)	12	(England) London Scottish FC
Ian Smith	Flanker	16 March 1965 (aged 30)	10	(England) Gloucester Rugby
Eric Peters	Number 8	28 January 1969 (aged 26)	6	(England) Bath Rugby
Bryan Redpath	Scrum-half	2 July 1971 (aged 23)	11	(Scotland) Melrose RFC
Craig Chalmers	Fly-half	15 October 1968 (aged 26)	43	(Scotland) Melrose RFC
Scott Hastings	Centre	4 December 1964 (aged 30)	54	(Scotland) Watsonians RFC
Ian Jardine	Centre	28 May 1965 (aged 29)	8	(Scotland) Stirling County RFC
Graham Shiel	Centre	13 August 1970 (aged 24)	11	(Scotland) Melrose RFC
Kenny Logan	Wing	3 April 1972 (aged 23)	16	(Scotland) Stirling County RFC
Craig Joiner	Wing	21 April 1974 (aged 21)	8	(Scotland) Melrose RFC
Tony Stanger	Wing	14 May 1968 (aged 27)	37	(Scotland) Hawick RFC
Gavin Hastings (c)	Fullback	3 January 1962 (aged 33)	57	(Scotland) Watsonians RFC
Cameron Glasgow	Fullback	24 February 1966 (aged 29)	0	(Scotland) Heriot's RC

=== Tonga ===
Head coach: Fakahau Valu Manager: Mailefihi Tukuʻaho

Note: Flags indicate national union for the club/province as defined by World Rugby.

Player	Position	Date of birth (age)	Caps	Club/province
Saili Feʻao	Prop	1966 (age 29)	0	(Australia) Sunnybank/Queensland
Feʻao Vunipola	Hooker	6 January 1969 (aged 26)	10	(Tonga) Toa-ko-Maʻafu RFC
Fololisi Masila	Hooker	circa 1967 (29 years)	7	(Tonga) Kolomotuʻa
Tuʻakalau Fukofuka	Prop	1972 (age 23)	5	(New Zealand) Auckland
Etuini Talakai	Prop	1 October 1973 (aged 21)	6	(New Zealand) Auckland
Takau Lutua	Prop	circa 1963 (28 years)	8	(Tonga) Toloa Old Boys
Pouvalu Latukefu	Lock	4 March 1971 (aged 24)	2	(Australia) ACT Kookaburras
Falamani Mafi	Lock	6 March 1971 (aged 24)	7	(Australia) ACT Kookaburras
Inoke Afeaki	Lock	12 July 1973 (aged 21)	0	(New Zealand) Wellington
Willie Losʻe	Lock	22 July 1967 (aged 27)	0	(New Zealand) North Harbour
Ipolito Fenukitau	Flanker	22 July 1972 (aged 22)	9	(Australia) ACT Kookaburras
Feleti Fakaongo	Flanker	16 August 1970 (aged 24)	2	(New Zealand) King Country
Feleti Mahoni	Flanker	6 April 1973 (aged 22)	5	(Tonga) Fasi Maʻufanga
Mana Otai (c)	Number 8	21 September 1968 (aged 26)	2	(New Zealand) Manawatu
Manu Vunipola	Scrum-half	circa 1967 (26 years)	21	(Tonga) Toa-ko-Maʻafu RFC
Nafe Tufui	Scrum-half	19 September 1968 (aged 26)	6	(Tonga) Kolomotuʻa
Akuila Mafi	Fly-half	1969 (26 years)	0	(Tonga) Kolomotuʻa
Elisi Vunipola	Fly-half	5 July 1967 (aged 27)	11	(Tonga) Toa-ko-Maʻafu RFC
Falanisi Manukia	Fly-half	1972 (23 years)	7	(New Zealand) Auckland
David Manako	Centre	11 November 1971 (aged 23)	2	(New Zealand) Northland
Penieli Latu	Centre	20 February 1973 (aged 22)	4	(Tonga) Vaheloto
Unuoi Vaʻenuku	Centre	5 April 1976 (aged 19)	0	(Tonga) Kolofoʻou
Simana Mafileo	Centre	11 November 1971 (aged 23)	0	(New Zealand) Bay of Plenty
Alasika Taufa	Wing	14 August 1970 (aged 24)	3	(New Zealand) Wellington
Tevita Vaʻenuku	Wing	27 December 1967 (aged 27)	12	(Tonga) Kolofoʻou
Sateki Tuipulotu	Fullback	3 July 1971 (aged 23)	6	(Australia) New South Wales
Taipe ʻIsitolo	Fullback	1971 (24 years)	0	(Tonga) Kolofoʻou
