= 1993 Rugby World Cup Sevens squads =

Here is an overview of the teams which took part at the 1993 Rugby World Cup Sevens.

== Pool A ==
=== South Africa ===
- Head coach: Gysie Pienaar
1. Chris Badenhorst
2. Jannie Claassens
3. André Joubert
4. Dieter Kriese
5. Ruben Kruger
6. Dick Muir
7. Dion O'Cuinnegain
8. Jacques Olivier
9. Joost van der Westhuizen
10. Chester Williams

=== Fiji ===
Coach: Joe Sawailau

1. Etonia Nadura
2. Samisoni Rabaka
3. Mesake Rasari
4. Vesi Rauluni
5. Viliame Rauluni
6. Waisale Serevi
7. Fili Seru
8. Sakeasi Vonolagi
9. Jone Vueti
10. Penisoni Waki
11. Noa Nadruku

=== Wales ===
Coach: Bob Norster

1. Simon Davies
2. Robert Howley
3. Neil Jenkins
4. Emyr Wyn Lewis
5. Rupert Moon
6. Mark Perego
7. Wayne Proctor
8. Mark Thomas
9. David Williams
10. Andrew Williams

=== Japan ===
1. Takeomi Ito
2. Hironaga Kato
3. Sinali Latu
4. Tsutomu Matsuda
5. Yukio Motoki
6. Yoji Nagatomo
7. Paulo Nawalu
8. Shinji Ono
9. Hirofumi Ouchi
10. Yoshihito Yoshida

=== Romania ===
Coach: Paul Ciobanel

1. Cătălin Drăguceanu
2. Andrei Gurănescu
3. Șerban Gurănescu
4. Nicușor Marin
5. Adrian Mitocaru
6. Daniel Neaga
7. Cătălin Sasu
8. Bogdan Șerban
9. Ștefan Tofan
10. Vasile Udroiu
11. Martac Marius Cornel

=== Latvia ===
Head Coach: Uldis Bautris

1. Lauris Ērenpreiss
2. Pāvels Ivanovs
3. Aleksandrs Karaulovs
4. Vladimirs Ņikonovs
5. Nikolajs Petjuņins
6. Vjačeslavs Sņetkovs
7. Vadims Stepanovs
8. Kaspars Vekša
9. Armands Višņevskis
10. Demjans Zavadskis

== Pool B ==
=== New Zealand ===
Coach: (New Zealand) : Peter Thorburn Manager: (New Zealand) : M. Shannon

1. Todd Blackadder (Canterbury)
2. Frank Bunce (North Harbour)
3. Stu Forster (Otago)
4. Pat Lam (Auckland)
5. Glen Osborne (North Harbour)
6. Peter Woods (Bay of Plenty)
7. Junior Paramore (Counties)
8. Eric Rush (North Harbour)
9. Dallas Seymour (Canterbury)
10. John Timu (Otago)

=== Ireland ===
- Head coach: Noel Murphy

No.	Player	Position
1	Vince Cunningham	Centre
2	Eric Elwood	Fly-half
3	Mick Galwey	Forward
4	Jonathan Garth	Forward
5	Brian Glennon	
6	Paddy Johns	Forward
7	Bill Mulcahy	
8	Dennis McBride	Forward
9	Alain Rolland	Scrum-half
10	Richard Wallace	Wing

=== South Korea ===
1. Chae Deuk-Joon
2. Cho Doo-Hwan
3. Cho Sung-Chul
4. Choi Chang-Yul
5. Neil Crooks
6. Kang Dong-Ho
7. Kim Yeon-Ki
8. Lee Keun-Wook
9. Park Jin-Bae
10. Sung Hae-Kyung

=== France ===
1. Philippe Bernat-Salles
2. David Berty
3. Eric Bonneval
4. Laurent Cabannes
5. Dominique Dal Pos
6. Christophe Deylaude
7. Didier Faugeron
8. Said Filali
9. Thierry Janeczek
10. Ugo Mola

=== United States ===
Coach: Steve Finkel

1. Will Brewington (Maryland Old Boys)
2. Jim Burgett (Old Puget Sound Beach)
3. Andrew Dujakovich (Kansas City)
4. Gary Hein (Old Blue RFC)
5. John Hinkin (OMBAC)
6. Chris O'Brien (Old Blue RFC)
7. Tony Ridnell (Old Puget Sound Beach)
8. Scott Stephens (Washington RFC)
9. Mike Telkamp (Old Puget Sound Beach)
10. Brian Vizard (OMBAC)

=== Netherlands ===
1. Paul Blom
2. Gottfried Bos
3. Martin Geelhord
4. André Marcker
5. Terepal Marcker
6. Martijn Nagtegaal
7. Arno Seybel
8. Erik Tabak
9. Bernardus Verhofstad
10. Bart Wieringa

== Pool C ==
=== Tonga ===
- Coach: 'Ila Tapueluelu
1. Isi Fatani
2. Samisoni Lolo
3. Teutau Loto'ahea
4. Finau Ma'afu
5. Feleti Mahoni
6. Isi Tuivai
7. Tevita Vaʻenuku
8. Elisi Vunipola
9. Manu Vunipola
10. Willie Wolfgramm

=== Australia ===
1. Matt Burke (New South Wales)
2. David Campese (New South Wales)
3. Ryan Constable (Queensland)
4. Jin Fenwicke
5. John Flett (New South Wales)
6. Ronnie Kirkpatrick
7. Grant Lodge (New South Wales)
8. Michael Lynagh (New South Wales)
9. Viliami Ofahengaue (New South Wales)
10. Ilie Tabua (Queensland)
11. Semi Taupeaafe (New South Wales)

=== Argentina ===
Head Coaches: Ricardo Paganini and Miguel Setién

1. Lisandro Arbizu (Belgrano Athletic)
2. Pedro Baraldi (Jockey Club Rosario)
3. Gonzalo Camardón (Alumni)
4. Fernando del Castillo (Jockey Club Rosario)
5. Gonzalo García (Duendes)
6. Hernan Garcia Simon (Pueyrredón)
7. Horacio Herrera (Córdoba Athletic)
8. Gustavo Jorge (Pucará)
9. Santiago Mesón (Tucumán R.C.)
10. Martín Terán (Tucumán R.C.)
11. Cristián Viel (Newman)

=== Scotland ===
1. Mark Appleson
2. Stuart Bennett
3. Ian Corcoran
4. Carl Hogg
5. John Kerr
6. Dave Millard
7. Mark Moncrieff
8. Andrew Nicol
9. Gregor Townsend
10. Derek Turnbull
11. Fergus Wallace
12. Doddie Weir

=== Italy ===
1. Michelangelo Amore (CUS Catania)
2. Stefano Barba (Milan)
3. Massimo Bonomi (Milan)
4. Marcello Cuttitta (Milan)
5. Diego Dominguez (Milan)
6. Ivan Francescato (Benetton Treviso)
7. Nicola Giuliato (US Casale)
8. Javier Pértile (Rugby Roma Olympic)
9. Francesco Pietrosanti (L'Aquila)
10. Paolo Vaccari (Milan)

=== Taiwan ===
1. Hwang Chao-Hsien
2. Hwang Kuo-Cheng
3. Juang Gwo-Jin
4. Kao Chiya-Liang
5. Lee Wan-Rien
6. Lin Chih-Shao
7. Liu Pe-Yi
8. Murray Wallace
9. Tseng Chi-Ming
10. Weng Ching-Shue
11. Wu Tsu-Chi

== Pool D ==
=== Samoa ===
Coach: Taufusi Salesa Manager:Marina Schaffhausen

1. Andrew Aiolupo (Moata'a)
2. Alama Ieremia (Wellington)
3. Danny Kaleopa (Moata'a)
4. Lolani Koko (Moata'a)
5. Brian Lima (Marist St Joseph)
6. Veli Patu (Vaiala)
7. Ofisa Tonu'u (Wellington)
8. To'o Vaega (Vaiala)
9. Sila Vaifale (Marist St Joseph)
10. Alefaio Vaisuai (Moata'a)

=== England ===
Coach: Les Cusworth

1. Adedayo Adebayo
2. Nick Beal
3. Justyn Cassell
4. Lawrence Dallaglio
5. Matt Dawson
6. Andrew Harriman (c)
7. Damian Hopley
8. Tim Rodber
9. Chris Sheasby
10. Dave Scully
11. Michael Dods*

* player from Reserve pool

=== Spain ===
Coach: (France) Gérard Murillo

1. Jon Azkargorta - (Centre/Fullback) - Getxo RT
2. Francisco Puertas (Fullback/Fly-half) - Bayonne
3. Pablo Calderón (Centre) - CD Arquitectura
4. José Miguel Villaú (Lock) - Universidad de Sevilla
5. Unai Aurrekoetxea (Fly half) - Getxo RT
6. Alberto Malo (Flanker/Number 8) - UE Santboiana
7. Jon Etxebarria (Flanker) - Getxo RT
8. Iñaki Laskurain - (Flanker) - Getxo RT
9. Javier Díaz (Scrum-half) - Getxo RC
10. José Ángel Hermosilla (Wing) - Valladolid RAC
11. Pablo Gutiérrez (Fullback) - Moraleja Alcobendas Rugby Union
12. Gabriel Rivero (Centre/Fullback) - Pauillac
13. Jaime Gutiérrez (Flanker) - Moraleja Alcobendas Rugby Union

=== Canada ===
Coach: (Canada) Ian Birtwell

1. Al Charron
2. Barry Ebl
3. John Graf
4. Dave Lougheed
5. Julian Loveday
6. Gord MacKinnon
7. Scott MacKinnon
8. Scott Stewart
9. Chris Tynan

=== Hong Kong ===
Coach: (New Zealand) George Simpkin

1. Adam Adair
2. Ashley Billington
3. David Bulbeck
4. Stephen Burton
5. Philippe Lacamp
6. Simon Litster
7. Craig Pain
8. Ian Strange
9. Mark Thomas
10. Stuart Krohn

=== Namibia ===
1. Gerhard Barnard
2. Johan Barnard
3. Basie Buitendag
4. Piet du Plooy
5. André Hutsamen
6. Gerhard Mans
7. Michel Marais
8. Eden Meyer
9. Scott Nicol
10. Henning Snyman
11. Pieter von Wielligh
