= Latu =

Latu may be,

- Latu language
- Los Angeles Tenants Union

== People with the surname "Latu" include ==
- Akapei Latu (born 1978), Tongan judoka
- Cameron Latu (born 2000), American football player
- Cathrine Latu (born 1986), Tongan-New Zealand netball player
- George Latu (born 1965), Samoan lawyer
- Keleki Latu (born 2002), American football player
- Laiatu Latu (born 2000), American football player
- Leilani Latu (born 1993), Tongan rugby league footballer
- Nili Latu (born 1982), Tongan rugby union footballer
- Patrick Latu, American rugby league footballer
- Penieli Latu (born 1973), Tongan rugby league footballer
- Sam Latu (born 1988), Australian rugby union footballer
- Sinali Latu (born 1965), Tongan-Japanese rugby union footballer
- Sione Latu (born 1971), Tongan-Japanese rugby league footballer
- Tolu Latu (born 1993), Tongan-Australian rugby union footballer
- Viliami Latu, Tongan politician

== People with the given name "Latu" include ==
- Latu Fifita (born 1987), Australian-Tongan rugby league footballer
- Latu Makaafi (born 1982), Tongan rugby union footballer
- Latu Vaeno (born 1995), Tongan-New Zealand rugby union footballer
- Latu Vaʻeno (born 1959), Tongan rugby union footballer
