= Akatsuka =

Akatsuka may refer to:

- Akatsuka Botanical Garden, public garden in Japan
- Akatsuka Station (disambiguation), several train stations in Japan
- Akatsuka Award, semi-annual award for gag manga
- Akatsuka (surname)
