= Feao =

Feao or Feʻao is a name. Notable people with the name include:

- Feao Fotuaika (born 1993), New Zealand rugby union player
- Feʻao Vunipola (born 1969), Tongan rugby union player
- David Feao (born 1990), Australian rugby union player
- Saili Feʻao (born 1966), Tongan former rugby union player
