= Vaʻenuku =

Vaʻenuku is a surname. Notable people with the surname include:

- Tevita Vaʻenuku (born 1967), Tongan rugby union player
- Unuoi Vaʻenuku (born 1976), Tongan rugby union player
