= Feleti =

Feleti is a masculine given name.

Notable people with the name include:

- Feleti Fakaongo (born 1970), Tongan rugby union player
- Feleti Kaitu'u (born 1994), Australian rugby union player
- Feleti Mahoni (born 1973), Tongan rugby union player
- Feleti Mateo (born 1984), Tonga international rugby league footballer
- Feleti Sevele (born 1944), Tongan politician
- Feleti Teo (born 1962), Tuvaluan politician and lawyer

== See also ==
- Feleti Barstow Public Library, Utulei, American Samoa
- Jack Feleti (born 1995), Niuean weightlifter
