= Talakai =

Talakai is a surname. Notable people with the surname include:

- Adiana Talakai (born 1999), Australian rugby union player
- Chris Talakai (born 1994), Australian rugby union player
- Etuini Talakai (born 1970), Tongan rugby union player
- Latu Talakai (born 1989), Tongan rugby union player
- Sam Talakai (born 1991), Australian rugby union player
- Siosifa Talakai (born 1997), Tongan rugby league player
