= Akatsuka (surname) =

Akatsuka (written: 赤塚) is a Japanese surname. Notable people with the surname include:

- Fujio Akatsuka (赤塚 不二夫; 1935–2008), Japanese manga artist
- Hiroyuki Akatsuka (赤塚 裕幸; born 1940), Japanese sport shooter
- Akatsuka Jitoku (赤塚 自得; 1871–1936), Japanese lacquerware artist
- Noriko Akatsuka (1937–2016), Japanese linguist
- Takashi Akatsuka (赤塚 隆; born 1973), Japanese rugby union player
- Yasushi Akatsuka (赤塚 康志; born 1978), Japanese Bassist
