= Isitolo =

Isitolo is a given name and surname. Notable people with the name include:

- Isitolo Maka (born 1975), New Zealand rugby union player
- Taipe ʻIsitolo (born 1971), Tongan rugby union player
