= Siniša =

- Gender: male
- Language: Serbo Croatian

Origin
- Origin: Slavic
- Meaning: sin ("son")
- Region of origin: Balkans

Other names
- Alternative spelling: Sinisa, Sinisha

Siniša (Serbian Cyrillic: Синиша) is a South Slavic masculine given name of medieval Serbian origin. It may refer to:

- Simeon Uroš "Siniša" (1326–1371), Serbian ruler of Epirus and Thessaly
- Siniša Branković (born 1979), Serbian soccer player
- Siniša Dobrasinović (born 1977), Montenegrin-born Cypriot football player
- Sinișa Dragin (born 1960), Serbian-Romanian film director
- Siniša Đurić (born 1976), Bosnian Serb football manager and former player
- Siniša Ergotić (born 1968), Croatian long jumper
- Siniša Gagula (born 1984), Bosnian football player
- Siniša Glavašević (1960–1991), Croatian reporter who was killed in the Battle of Vukovar
- Siniša Gogić (born 1963), Serbian and Cypriot football striker
- Siniša Janković (born 1978), Serbian football forward
- Siniša Kelečević (born 1970), Croatian basketball player
- Siniša Kovačević (born 1954), Serbian author and playwright, professor of the Belgrade Academy of Arts
- Siniša Linić (born 1982), Croatian football midfielder
- Sinisa Malesevic MRIA (born 1969), political/historical sociologist at the University College, Dublin
- Siniša Mihajlović (born 1969), Serbian former football player turned manager
- Siniša Mulina (born 1973), Bosnia and Herzegovina international footballer
- Siniša Oreščanin (born 1972), Croatian football manager
- Siniša Radanović (born 1979), Serbian central defender
- Siniša Saničanin (born 1995), Bosnian footballer
- Siniša Skelin (born 1974), Croatian rower who has won two Olympic medals
- Siniša Školneković (born 1968), former Croatian water polo player
- Siniša Stevanović (born 1989), Serbian footballer
- Siniša Ubiparipović (born 1983), Serbian-American footballer
- Siniša Vuco (born 1971), Croatian singer and songwriter

== See also ==
- John Sinisa, Tongan rugby league player
- Siniša Broćeta Serbian humanists in Milan (Italy)
