= Lutua =

Lutua is a surname. Notable people with the surname include:

- Takau Lutua (born c. 1963), Tongan rugby union player
- Viliami Lutua (born c. 1956), Tongan rugby union player
