= Fakahau =

Fakahau is a given name and surname. Notable people with the name include:

- Fakahau Valu (born 1950), Tongan rugby union player
- Semisi Fakahau (1948−2022), Tongan politician
