= Simana =

Simana may refer to:

- Simana Mafileo (born 1969), Tongan former rugby union player
- Simana Periye, Bangladeshi film
