= Alefaio Vaisuai =

- Born: Alefaio Vaisuai; 21 September 1963 (age 63) Moata'a, Samoa

Rugby union career
Senior career
Years	Team	Apps	(Points)
199?-1998	Moata'a		
National sevens team
Years	Team		Comps
1988-1998	Samoa		1993

Alefaio Vaisuai (born Moata'a, 21 September 1963) is a Samoan former rugby sevens player who played as flanker.

== Career ==
At club level, Vaisuai played for Moata'a, which was the club where played many legends such as Michael Jones, Danny Kaleopa, Andy Aiolupo, Lolani Koko and Taufusi Salesa. He took part in the 1993 Rugby World Cup Sevens playing for Samoa sevens, as well in the 1993-1994 Hong Kong Sevens, where in the latter he scored the winning try against Fiji. He also played the 1996 Punta del Este Sevens tournament. He also took part at the 1992 Middlesex Sevens, in which Western Samoa won the final.

== Personal life ==
Currently he is married and has a daughter, and he lives in Glen Eden, Auckland.
