= Lassissi =

Lassissi is an African surname. Notable people with the surname include:

- Ismaila Lassissi (born 1969), Ivorian rugby union footballer
- Saliou Lassissi (born 1978), Ivorian footballer
