= Sayama Secom Rugguts =

Japanese rugby union club, based in Sayama

(Japan) Secom Rugguts セコムラガッツ
- Full name: Secom Rugguts
- Union: Japan Rugby Football Union
- Nickname: Rugguts
- Founded: 1985; 41 years ago
- Location: Sayama, Saitama, Japan
- Ground(s): SECOM Rugby Field, Sayama; Ashikaga Athletic Stadium, Ashikaga; JIT Recycle Ink Stadium, Kofu; Tochigi Green Stadium, Utsunomiya; Ebina Sports Park, Ebina
- Coach: Scott Pierce
- Captain: Koki Iida
- League(s): Japan Rugby League One, Division Three
- 2025: 2th Relegated to Division Three
1st kit	2nd kit

Official website
- www.rugguts.secom.co.jp

Secom Rugguts is a Japanese rugby union team founded in 1985 by SECOM. Its name is a portmanteau of "Rugger" and "Guts". The club was in the Top League for the first season of the league but was demoted at the end of the season. As the top team of the Top East league and by then coming second after Fukuoka Sanix Bombs in the three-way Top League Challenge Series, Secom got back into the Top League for the 2005–6 season but was relegated again in 2006–7.

On February 10, 2008, Secom's 3–10 loss to World Fighting Bull in the Top Challenge Two series ended its challenge to return to the Top League for the 2008–9 season.

Slogan for 2006 season: "Seize the day"

Rugguts will return to Japanese rugby system in season 2024–2025 to third tier of the rebranded Japan Rugby League One.

On 1 July 2024, the club rebranded itself to "Sayama Secom Rugguts".

== Current squad ==
The Secom Rugguts squad for the 2026–27 season is:

Secom Rugguts squad
**Props**: (Japan) Kentaro Ueno; (Japan) Daichi Inami; (Japan) Toshiki Sato; (Japan) Shogo Murakami; (Japan) Naoto Shirakawa; (Japan) Sotaro Tanaka; (Japan) Motoki Kaneko; (Japan) Makoto Kurata; **Hookers**: (Japan) Fūgo Takada; (Japan) Shota Okuno; (Japan) Tatsuki Tanina; (Japan) Minato Jinnouchi; (Japan) Shoki Teranishi; **Locks**: (Samoa) **Sam Slade**; (South Africa) PJ Steenkamp; (Japan) Kazuki Asakura; (New Zealand) Troy Callander*; (Japan) Itsuki Fujī; (Japan) Kosei Kanda; (Japan) Yūga Kawase; (New Zealand) **Jackson Hemopo**	**Flankers**: (New Zealand) Whetu Douglas* (cc); (New Zealand) Adrian Choat; (Japan) Kento Mizutani; (Japan) Ryūsuke Yamamoto; (Japan) Koki Īda (cc); (Japan) Yūki Tsujioka; (Japan) Ikki Morimoto; **No8s**: (Japan) So Kinoshita; **Loose forwards** **Scrum-halves**: (Japan) Kanaru Takahashi; (Japan) Ryotaro Shimizu; (Japan) Akito Takechi; **Fly-halves**: (Japan) Shota Kutsuna; (New Zealand) Daniel Wait; (Tonga) **Manu Vunipola**; (Japan) Kaito Sugawara	**Centres**: (Japan) Taisei Tanaka; (Japan) Fishipuna Tuiaki*; (New Zealand) TJ Faiane*; (Japan) Tomoya Haraguchi; (Japan) Haruya Nakasu; (Japan) Shoki Morimoto; (Japan) Keita Ichikawa; (New Zealand) Curtis Reid*; **Wings**: (Japan) Yoshihiro Noguchi; (Japan) Ryūnosuke Fujiwara; (Japan) Ayumu Sawada; (Japan) Riku Mizuno; (Japan) Tatsuki Kanza; (Japan) Yūshi Okuda; (Fiji) Tomasi Naivaluwaqa**; **Fullbacks**: (New Zealand) Chase Tiatia; (Japan) Yūdai Ishī; (Japan) Kanta Noguchi; **Utility backs**
(c) denotes team captain.; **Bold** denotes internationally capped.

== Notable players ==
=== Japan ===
- Motohiro Akagi
- Kensuke Iwabuchi (Former Japan international)
- Tomohiro Oinuma (currently playing for Ricoh Black Rams)
- Noriyoshi Ohara (currently Iwate Morioka High School RFC coach)
- Kota Kawashima (currently playing for Kintetsu Liners)
- Takashi Kamio
- Yoshiyuki Koike
- Takamasa Sawaguchi (former Japan international)
- Manabu Komatsu (currently playing for Mitsubishi Sagamihara DynaBoars)
- Yuta Sato (currently playing for Kamaishi Seawaves)
- Ken Suzuki
- Yosuke Shishido
- Manabu Suzuki
- Takashi Suzuki (currently playing for Kubota Spears and Japan Sevens)
- Naoto Tanemoto (former Rugguts coach and Japan international, Waseda University RFC coach)
- Yoshikazu Tamura (currently playing for Yamaha Jubilo)

=== Other Nationalities ===
- Brian Lima (Former Samoa international)
- Inoke Afeaki (Former Tonga international)
- Sene Ta'ala (Former Samoa international)
- Norman Ligairi (Former Fiji international)
- Seremaia Bai(Former Fiji international)
- Feleti Mahoni (Former Tonga international)
- Feleti Fakaongo (Former Tonga international)
- Penieli Latu (Former Tonga international)
- Murray Paul Tocker, Secom Coach 2001–2003, (Former Wellington Lions player

Marist ST Pats Player )

== See also ==
- Secom
- Top East League
