= Mafileo =

Mafileo is a given name and surname. Notable people with the name include:

- Mafileo Kefu (born 1983), Australian rugby union footballer
- Simana Mafileo (born 1969), Tongan rugby union player
- Sione Mafileo (born 1993), New Zealand rugby union player
- Tevita Mafileo (born 1998), New Zealand rugby union player
- Salote Mafileʻo Pilolevu Tuita (born 1951), Tongan princess
