= Akuila Mafi =

Tonga international rugby union player (born 1969)

- Born: 1969 (age 56–57) Tonga

Rugby union career
- Position: Fly-half
- Current team: --
Senior career
Years	Team	Apps	(Points)
199?-199?	Kolomotu'a		
International career
Years	Team	Apps	(Points)
1995	Tonga	1	(0)

Akuila Mafi (born in 1969) is a Tasmanian-raised Tongan former rugby union fly-half.

== Career ==
Mafi started his international career playing in the 1995 Rugby World Cup Tonga squad, coached by Fakahau Valu. He played against Ivory Coast, in Rustenburg, on 3 June, where he replaced the first choice fly-half Elisi Vunipola during the match. This match was also his last cap for Tonga.
