= Asaeli Ai Valu =

Tongan-Japanese rugby union footballer (1989-)

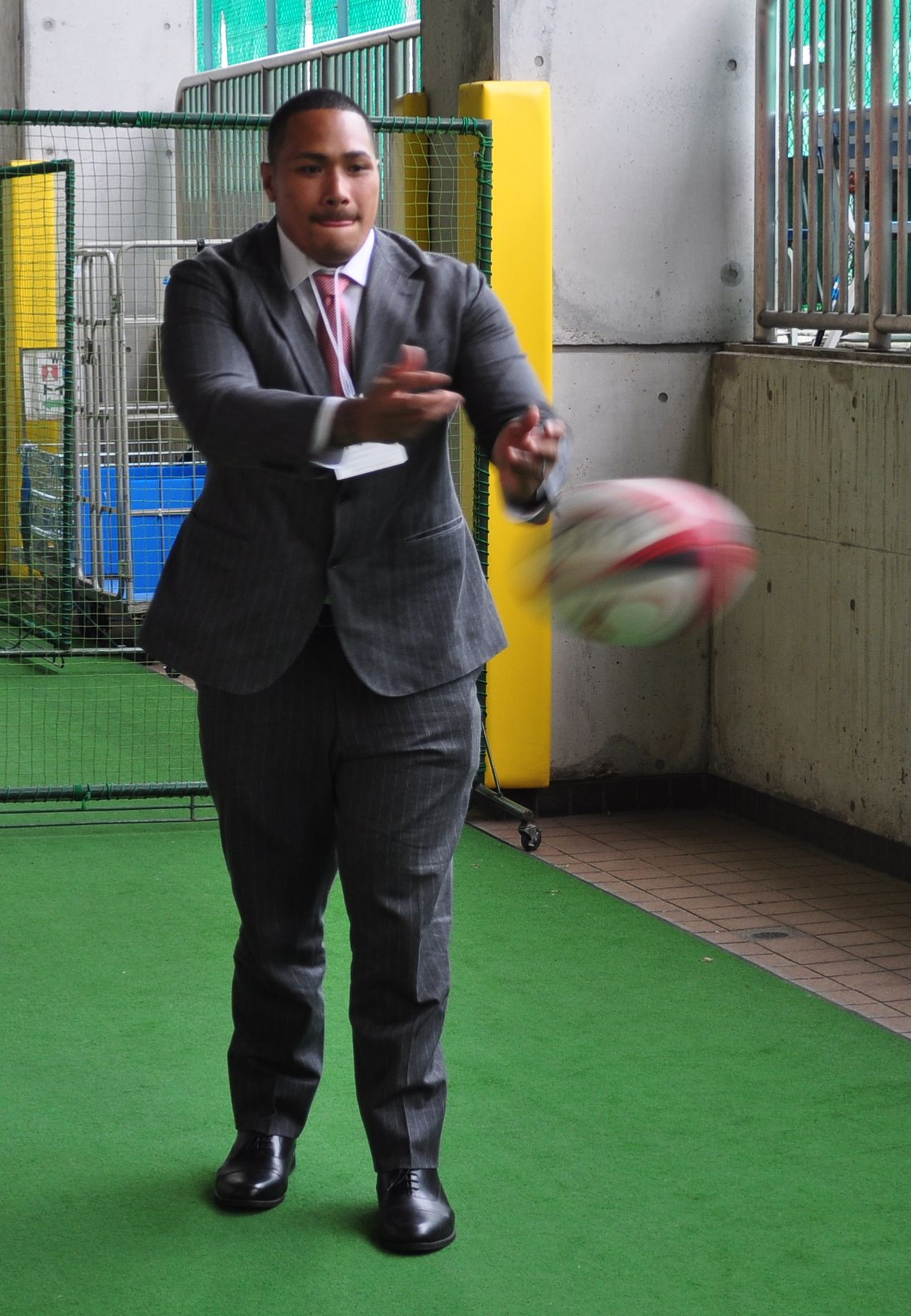
- Ai Valu representing the Sunwolves during Super Rugby
- Born: 7 May 1989 (age 37) Tofoa, Tonga
- Height: 1.87 m (6 ft 2 in)
- Weight: 115 kg (254 lb; 18 st 2 lb)
- School: Shochi Fukaya High School
- University: Saitama Institute of Technology
- Notable relative: Fakahau Valu (father)

Rugby union career
- Position(s): Tighthead Prop, Flanker, Number 8
- Current team: Panasonic Wild Knights
Senior career
Years	Team	Apps	(Points)
2014–	Panasonic Wild Knights	142	(85)
2018–2019	Sunwolves	6	(0)
- Correct as of 28 August 2023
International career
Years	Team	Apps	(Points)
2017–2023	Japan	30	(10)
- Correct as of 28 August 2023

Asaeli Ai Valu (ヴァル アサエリ愛, Baru Asaeri Ai; born 7 May 1989) is a professional rugby union player who plays as a prop for Japan Rugby League One club Saitama Wild Knights. Born in Tonga, he represents Japan at international level after qualifying on residency grounds.

== International career ==
After 4 Top League seasons for Panasonic Wild Knights Ai Valu received his first call-up to his adopted country, Japan's senior squad ahead of the 2017 end-of-year rugby union internationals.

== Personal life ==
Valu received Japanese Citizenship in 2017. He is the son of former rugby union player Fakahau Valu, who represented Tonga at the 1987 Rugby World Cup.

In Valu's university times, during the rugby off-season, he worked part-time at a farm-house and appeared at the Nippon Television variety show The! Tetsuwan! DASH!!.

Upon acquiring Japanese citizenship, he added the first kanji of his wife's name (Ai (愛)) to his Japanese name. His wife's great-uncle is the comedian Kinichi Hagimoto. Although Valu himself has not met Hagimoto, he has been received with a phone call.
