= Alejandro Petra =

Alejandro Petra is an Argentine rugby union coach and sports manager. He is professionally a physician.

He was one of the coaches of Tucumán Rugby Club, with Luis Castillo and Manuel Galindo.

Petra was one of the two head coaches of Argentina, with Ricardo Paganini at the 1995 Rugby World Cup. They couldn't avoid Argentina elimination in the 1st round. After the competition, Ricardo Paganini was replaced by Emilio Perasso.

Petra was the manager of Argentina during their tour of South Africa and Europe in 2002.
