= Curtis Reid (rugby union) =

- Born: 11 December 1994 (age 31) Auckland
- Height: 1.86 m (6 ft 1 in)
- Weight: 101 kg (15 st 13 lb)
- School: Westlake Boys High School

Rugby union career
- Position(s): Centre, Wing, Fullback
Amateur team(s)
Years	Team	Apps	(Points)
2013-2015,2018-2020;	Northcote Birkenhead Rugby & Sports Club		
2016-2017;	College Old Boys		
Senior career
Years	Team	Apps	(Points)
2021-2025	Akita Northern Bullets	30	(88)
2025-	Secom Rugguts	7	(35)
Provincial / State sides
Years	Team	Apps	(Points)
2016-2017;	Manawatu	11	(45)
- Correct as of 30 September 2017
National sevens team
Years	Team		Comps
2019–2020	New Zealand		

Curtis Reid (born 11 December 1994) is a New Zealand rugby union player. He currently plays for Manawatu in the Mitre 10 Cup.

Originally from Auckland, Reid attended Westlake Boys High School.

In 2015 Reid was part of the North Harbour set-up, however he only played matches for North Harbour B as others were preferred over him.

In early 2016 Reid moved down to Palmerston North to complete a business degree. He joined the College Old Boys club and based on a strong first club season he was selected for two Manawatu pre-season games.

He was then offered a full contract and he made his debut on 26 August against Southland.
