= Falamani Mafi =

Tongan rugby union player

- Born: 6 March 1971 (age 55) Kanokupolu, Tonga
- Height: 6 ft 5 in (196 cm)
- Weight: 264 lb (120 kg)

Rugby union career
- Position: Lock
Amateur team(s)
Years	Team	Apps	(Points)
1990-1993	Uni-Norths Owls		
1993-1994	Wests Lions		
1995-1996	Queanbeyan Whites		
Senior career
Years	Team	Apps	(Points)
1996-2000	Yokogawa Musashino Atlastars		
Provincial / State sides
Years	Team	Apps	(Points)
1993-1995	ACT Kookaburras		
International career
Years	Team	Apps	(Points)
1993-1999	Tonga	22	(10)

Falamani Mafi (born 6 March 1971, in Kanokupolu) is a Tongan former rugby union player. He played as lock

== Career ==
His first cap for Tonga was against Australia, in Brisbane, on 4 July 1993. He was also part of the 1995 Rugby World Cup Tonga squad coached by Fakahau Valu, where Mafi played two matches in the tournament. During the match against France, Mafi stomped the French player Philippe Benetton, however, his teammate Feleti Mahoni was sent off instead. Mafi also played in the 1999 Rugby World Cup, playing against New Zealand, Italy and England, the latter being his last international cap for Tonga.
