= Sene Ta'ala =

Samoan rugby union player

- Born: 20 October 1973 (age 53) Johnsonville, New Zealand
- Height: 6 ft 4 in (1.93 m)
- Weight: 260 lb (120 kg)
- Notable relative(s): Laifa Ta'ala (brother); Irisa Ta'ala (nephew)

Rugby union career
Amateur team(s)
Years	Team	Apps	(Points)
1996-1999	Johnsonville		
Senior career
Years	Team	Apps	(Points)
2001-2007	Secom Rugguts		
Provincial / State sides
Years	Team	Apps	(Points)
1996–1999	Wellington	25	(15)
International career
Years	Team	Apps	(Points)
1996–2001	Samoa	18	(0)

Laifa Sene Ta'ala (born Johnsonville, New Zealand, 20 October 1973) is a New Zealand-born Samoan former rugby union player. He played as a flanker.

== Career ==
He started his international career during a match against Tonga, at Apia, on 13 June 1996. He was part of the 1999 Rugby World Cup roster, where he played 4 matches. His last international cap was during a match against Japan, at Tokyo, on Jule 4, 2001.
