= Saili Feʻao =

Tonga international rugby union player

Willie Fe`ao
- Born: Saili Fe`ao; 1966 (age 59–60) Tonga
- Notable relative: David Feao (son)

Rugby union career
- Position: Prop
Senior career
Years	Team	Apps	(Points)
- Sunnybank Rugby
Provincial / State sides
Years	Team	Apps	(Points)
199?-199?	Queensland		
International career
Years	Team	Apps	(Points)
1995	Tonga	7	(15)

Saili Fe`ao, known also as Willie Fe`ao, (born in 1966) is a Tongan former rugby union player who played as prop. He is the father of the Tongan rugby union international rugby player David Feao.

== Career ==
Fe`ao started his international career playing in the 1995 Rugby World Cup Tonga squad, coached by Fakahau Valu. He played only two matches in the tournament played in Pretoria, being his first cap against France, on 26 May 1995 and against Scotland on 30 May 1995 his last cap.
