= Akatsuka Jitoku =

Japanese artist (1871–1936)

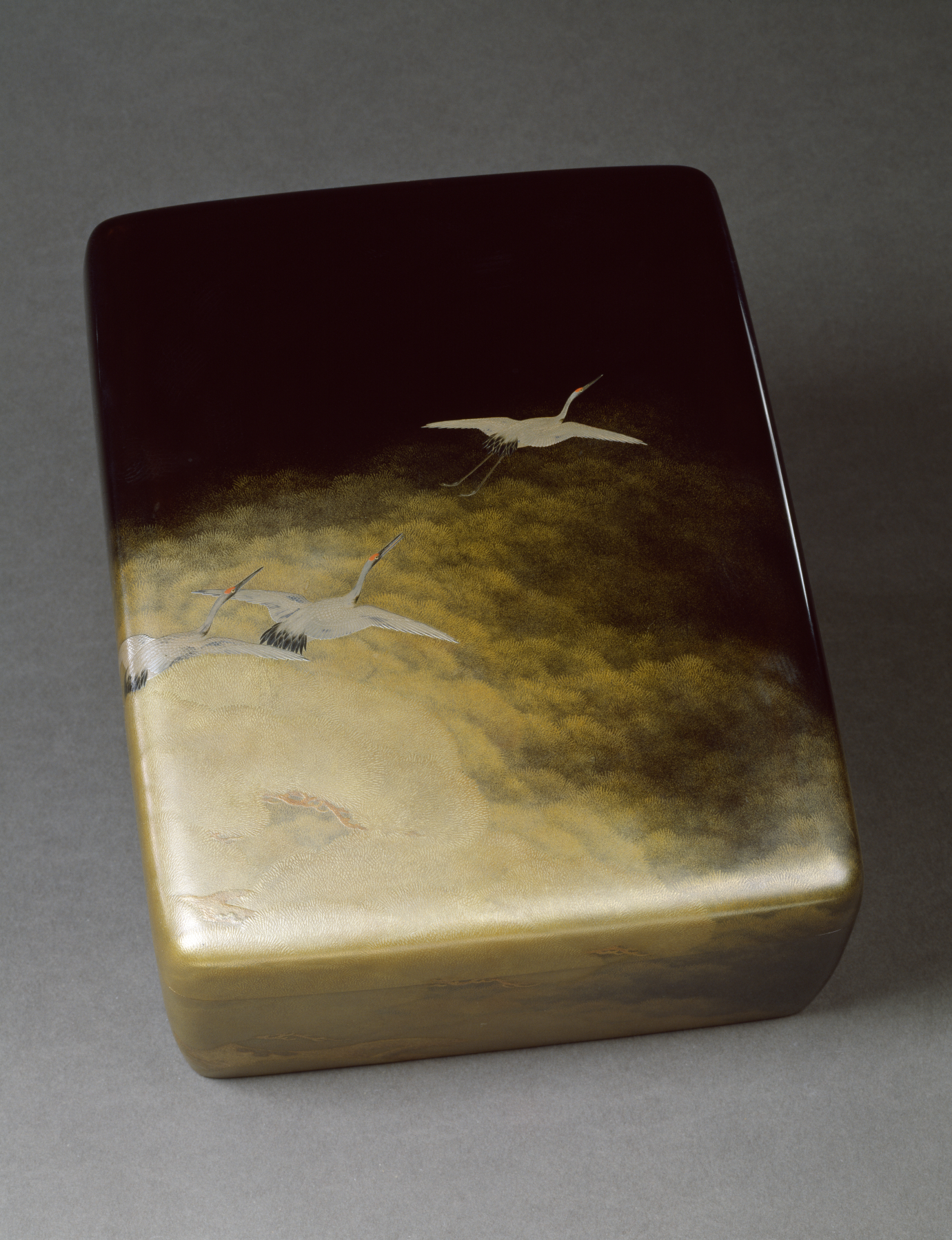
Box for Documents and Papers (ryoshi bako) with Cranes in Flight, Akatsuka Jitoku, c. 1904, lacquer, gold and silver. In the collection of the Walters Art Museum.

Akatsuka Jitoku (赤塚 自得, 1871–1936) was a Japanese artist. He created Japanese lacquerware based on the Maki-e style. Jitoku attended the Japan Art Academy.
