= Falanisi Manukia =

- Born: 1972 (age 53–54) Tonga
- School: Kelston Boys' High School

Rugby union career
- Position: Fly-half
Amateur team(s)
Years	Team	Apps	(Points)
199?-199?	Kelston Boys' HS		
Provincial / State sides
Years	Team	Apps	(Points)
199?-199?	Auckland		
International career
Years	Team	Apps	(Points)
1993-1995	Tonga	7	(15)

Falanisi Manukia, known also as Francis Manukia, (born in 1972) is a Tongan former rugby union player who played as fly-half.

== Career ==
Manukia debuted for Tonga on 4 July 1993, playing against Australia in Brisbane He was also part of the 1995 Rugby World Cup Tonga squad, however, Manukia did not play any match in the tournament as a result of a hamstring injury, with Elisi Vunipola taking the role as Tonga's regular fly-half. His last international cap was against Japan, in Tokyo on 19 February 1995.
