= Secom =

Japanese security company

Secom Co., Ltd.

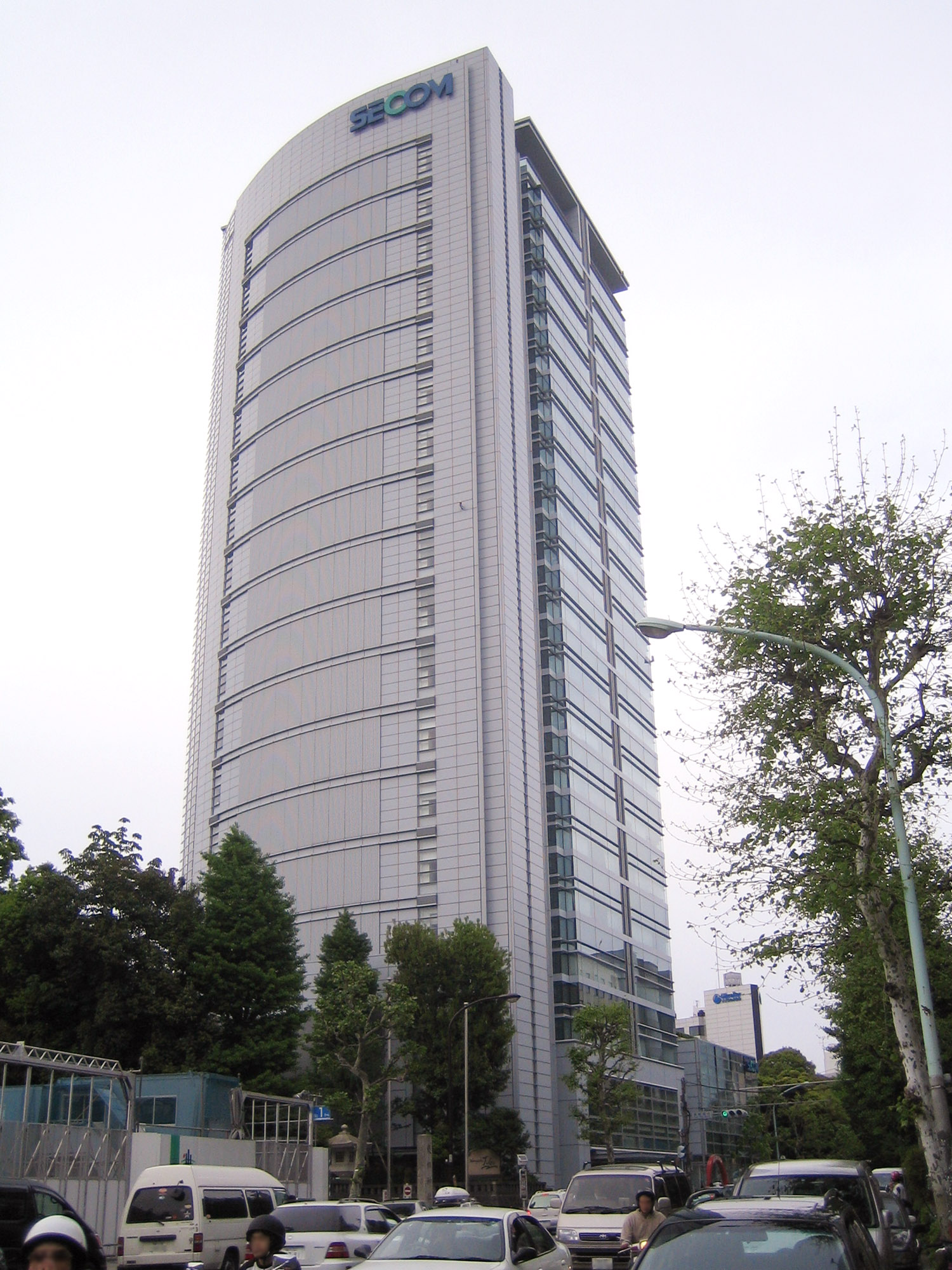
- Secom HQ in Shibuya, Tokyo
- Type: Public (K.K)
- Traded as: TYO: 9735
- Industry: Security
- Founded: 1962; 64 years ago
- Headquarters: Tokyo, Japan
- Area served: Worldwide
- Website: www.secom.co.jp

Secom Co., Ltd. (セコム株式会社, Sekomu Kabushiki-gaisha) is a Japanese security company headquartered in Tokyo, Japan. It has operations in Japan, United Kingdom, Australia, New Zealand, South Korea, Taiwan, China, Thailand, Vietnam, Malaysia, Singapore, Indonesia, and Myanmar.

== History ==
The company was founded in 1962 and operated under the name Nippon Keibi Hosho until 1983. It initially offered security services such as patrolling services and static guard services.

In 1966, the company developed Japan’s first on-line security system. In 1983, Nippon Keibi Hosho adapted the name Secom, which was originally used only as a brand name of the company. The Secom name "was coined as a contraction of 'security' and 'communication', the concept of this brand was to build 'a new security system collaborating people and science'”.
