= Nafe Tufui =

Tonga international rugby union player

- Born: September 19, 1968 (age 58) Tonga
- Height: 5 ft 5.5 in (166 cm)
- Weight: 176 lb (80 kg)

Rugby union career
- Position: Scrum-half
Senior career
Years	Team	Apps	(Points)
1990-199?	Haʻapai		
199?-1995	Kolomotu'a		
International career
Years	Team	Apps	(Points)
1990-1995	Tonga	8	(12)

Nafe Tufui (born 19 September 1968) is a Tongan former rugby union player. He played as scrum-half.

== Career ==
Tufui debuted for Tonga on 24 March 1990, against Fiji in Nuku'alofa. He was also part of the Tonga national team in the 1995 Rugby World Cup, playing two matches in the tournament, against Scotland in Pretoria and against Ivory Coast in Rustenburg, the latter being his last test cap. In 2005, Tufui was part of the Ikale Tahi management team, along with Sione Petelo, Tevita Vaʻenuku and Semi Taupeaafe.
