= Massimiliano Capuzzoni =

Italian rugby union player (1969–1995)

Massimiliano Capuzzoni (Milan, 17 April 1969 - Taormina, 5 August 1995) was an Italian rugby union player. He played as a flanker.

Capuzzoni played for A. S. Rugby Milano, where he started his career in 1981/82, at 12 years old, in the first categories. He joined the first team in 1987/88, aged 18 years old, and would remain in Rugby Milano until 1990/91. He moved to Rugby Lyons Piacenza for the two following seasons, 1991/92 to 1992/93. Capuzzoni returned to Milan, this time to play for Amatori Rugby Milano, from 1993/94 to 1994/95. He won the Italian Championship and the Cup of Italy in 1994/95, in what would be the last season of his career.

He had 2 caps for Italy, from 1993 to 1995, without scoring. He was called for the 1995 Rugby World Cup but never left the bench.

Capuzzoni was still a promising player when he died in the sequence of a diving accident in Taormina, Sicily, on 5 August 1995, aged only 26 years old. He was paid tribute five days later at the Mario Giuriati Stadium, of Rugby Milano, his first team, in a ceremony attended by fans of his three teams.

In a tribute to Capuzzoni, the Capuzzoni Memorial takes place every year since 1996, as a tournament held in Milan or Piacenza, between the three teams where he played.
