= Semi Taupeaafe =

Tonga international rugby union player

- Born: 29 July 1972 (age 54) Nuku'alofa, Tonga
- Height: 5 ft 10 in (178 cm)
- Weight: 210 lb (95 kg)

Rugby union career
- Position(s): Wing, Centre
Senior career
Years	Team	Apps	(Points)
1991-1993	Manly RUFC		(105)
1993-1998	NSW Waratahs		
1998-200?	Sanyo		
200?-present	Tokyo Gas		
International career
Years	Team	Apps	(Points)
1991-2001	Tonga	15	(0)

Samuela H. S. "Semi" Taupeaafe (born in Nuku'alofa, on 29 July 1972）is a Tongan former rugby union player. He played as wing and centre.

== Career ==
He represented Tonga in rugby union, Australia in rugby sevens, and Japan at the COBRA Rugby Tens, He is one of the rare players to play for three national teams. At the 1995 COBRA Rugby Tens, he led Japan to the final, lost against the Māori All Blacks. In 2005, Taupeaafe was part of the Ikale Tahi management team, along with Sione Petelo, Tevita Vaʻenuku and Nafe Tufui.

=== Club career ===
At club level, Taupeaafe played for the NSW Waratahs, then for Sanyo and later for Tokyo Gas Rugby Club.

=== International career ===
At international level, he debuted for Tonga on 11 June 1991, during the test match against Fiji, in Suva. Although not taking part at the 1995 Rugby World Cup, he would be called up later for the 1999 Rugby World Cup Tonga squad. At the tournament, he played 3 matches. His last cap was against Samoa, on 29 June 2001, in Nuku'alofa. He also represented Australia for the 1993 Rugby World Cup Sevens.
