= Édouard Angoran =

Ivorian rugby union player

Édouard Angoran (born 6 May 1970) is a former Ivorian rugby union player. He played as a hooker and as a flanker.

== Club career ==
Angoran played in France for US Colomiers (1993/94), Stade Rodez Aveyron (1994/95-1999/00) and Sporting Club Décazevillois (2000/01-2002/03).

== International career ==
He had 6 caps for Ivory Coast, from 1993 to 1995, without scoring. He had his debut at the 19-16 win over Tunisia, at 26 October 1993, in Tunis, for the 1995 Rugby World Cup qualification. He was called for the 1995 Rugby World Cup, where he played in all the three games, one of them as a substitute. He had his last game at the 29-11 loss to Tonga, at 3 June 1995, in Rustenburg. He wouldn't be called once again for the national team.
