= Eiji Hirotsu =

Japan international rugby union player

- Born: 24 November 1967 (age 58) Yamaguchi Prefecture, Japan
- University: Doshisha University

Rugby union career
- Position: Hooker
Senior career
Years	Team	Apps	(Points)
1989-2000	Kobelco Steelers		
International career
Years	Team	Apps	(Points)
1995	Japan	1	(0)

Eiji Hirotsu (弘津英司, Hirotsu Eiji) (born Yamaguchi, 24 November 1967) is a former Japanese rugby union player. He played as hooker.

== Career ==
Originally from Yamaguchi Prefecture, Hirotsu was educated at Doshisha University, for whose team he played until 1989, when he joined Kobe Steel, with which he won seven All-Japan Championship titles. In the Japan national team, he was also part of the 1995 Rugby World Cup roster, but his only cap was during the defeat against Tonga for 16-47, in Nagoya, on 11 February 1995.
