= Brendan Reidy =

- Born: 13 September 1968 (age 58) Wellington, New Zealand
- Height: 6 ft 1 in (1.85 m)
- Weight: 240 lb (109 kg)

Rugby union career
- Position: Prop
Amateur team(s)
Years	Team	Apps	(Points)
1994-1996	Marist St Pats		
Senior career
Years	Team	Apps	(Points)
1997–1999	Saracens	29	(5)
1999–2000	Rugby Rovigo		
2000–2002	ASM Clermont Auvergne	49	(25)
Provincial / State sides
Years	Team	Apps	(Points)
1994-1996	Wellington	11	(0)
International career
Years	Team	Apps	(Points)
1995–1999	Samoa	18	(0)

Brendan Philip Reidy (born 13 September 1968 in Wellington) is a New Zealand-born Samoan rugby union player. He plays as a prop.

== Career ==
He spent his club career first with the Saracens between 1997 and 1999, then with Rugby Rovigo for two years, and later, with AS Montferrand from 2000 to 2002, when he retired from the playing career. He was part of the 1995 and 1999 Rugby World Cup rosters, where he played for Samoa. He also played the National Provincial Championship in New Zealand for Wellington.
