= Tomoya Haneda =

Japan international rugby union player

- Born: 21 December 1968 (age 57) Osaka, Japan
- Height: 6 ft 2 in (188 cm)
- Weight: 227 lb (103 kg)

Rugby union career
- Position: Lock
Amateur team(s)
| Years | Team | Apps | (Points) |
- Okura High School
| – | Ryukoku University RFC | | |
Senior career
| Years | Team | Apps | (Points) |
| -2009 | World Co. | | |
| 2009- | Rokko Seahawks | | |
International career
| Years | Team | Apps | (Points) |
| 1995 | Japan | 1 | (0) |

Tomoya Haneda (羽根田智也, Haneda Tomoya) (born 21 December 1965 in Osaka) is a former Japanese rugby union player. He played as a lock.

== Career ==
After graduating from Okura High School, Haneda attended Ryukoku University, for whose rugby team he played in the All-Japan Rugby University Championship. Graduating from university, he joined World Co., with which he played the All-Japan Rugby Company Championship, for all his entire career, winning in 1994 World Co.'s first and only Kansai League A title, as well qualifying for the championship final lost against World Co.'s city rivals, Kobe Steel en 2000, finishing runner-up. In 1995, Haneda was called up by Osamu Koyabu, to play for the Japanese national team. His only cap was against Tonga, in Nagoya, on 11 February 1995. In the same year, he was in the Japanese squad for the third World Cup, but never saw action in the tournament. Since 2009, when World Fighting Bull disbanded, like many amateur players of the club, he moved to play for Rokko Seahawks non-corporate club (later renamed as Rokko Fighting Bull).
