= Akatsuka Station =

Akatsuka Station is the name of multiple train stations in Japan:

- Akatsuka Station (Ibaraki) (赤塚駅)
- Akatsuka Station (Shimane) (明塚駅)
- Chikatetsu-Akatsuka Station (地下鉄赤塚駅)
- Shimo-Akatsuka Station (下赤塚駅)
