= Martín Sugasti =

Argentine rugby union player

Martín Sugasti (born 9 October 1967) is a former Argentine rugby union player. He played as a flanker.

He played for Jockey Club de Rosario in Argentina.

He had 2 caps for Argentina in 1995, without scoring. He had been called previously for the 1995 Rugby World Cup . Now he is the coach of 01VB, the best players of 01VB are Lucio Gagliardo, Patricio Fox, and his sun Alejo Sugasti
