= Kazu Hamabe =

Japan international rugby union player

- Born: May 31, 1971 (age 55) Ishikawa Prefecture, Japan
- Height: 182 cm (6 ft 0 in)
- Weight: 110 kg (243 lb)
- School: Hakui Industrial High School

Rugby union career
- Position: Prop
Senior career
Years	Team	Apps	(Points)
199?-2008	Kintetsu		
International career
Years	Team	Apps	(Points)
1996-2001	Japan	12	(0)

Kazu Hamabe (浜辺和, Hamabe Kazu) (born Ishikawa Prefecture, 31 May 1971) is a former Japanese rugby union player who played as prop.

== Career ==
Hailing from Ishikawa Prefecture, Hamabe was educated at Hakui Industrial High School. He played for Kintetsu Liners between the late 1990s and the early 2000s. Although he was in the 1995 Rugby World Cup Japan squad, he did not play in any of the tournament matches, his first cap for Japan was during the match against Canada, in Tokyo, on 9 June 1996. Although he did not take part in the 1999 Rugby World Cup, Hamabe was in the Japan national team until 2001, on 8 July, in Tokyo, during the match against Canada, the team against which he played his first international match.
