= Toussaint Djehi =

Ivorian rugby union player

Toussaint Djehi (born 1 November 1962, in Abidjan) is a former Ivorian rugby union player. He played as a prop.

Djehi played in France for Stade Poitevin Rugby (1986/87–1988/89), SC Tulle (1989/90–1990/91), Stade Rodez Aveyron (1991/92–1992/93), SO Millau (1993/94–1994/95), and once again for Stade Rodez Aveyron (1995/96–1998/99).

He had 8 caps for Ivory Coast, from 1993 to 1995, without scoring. He was called for the 1995 Rugby World Cup, playing in all the three games.
