= John Sinisa =

Tonga international rugby league footballer

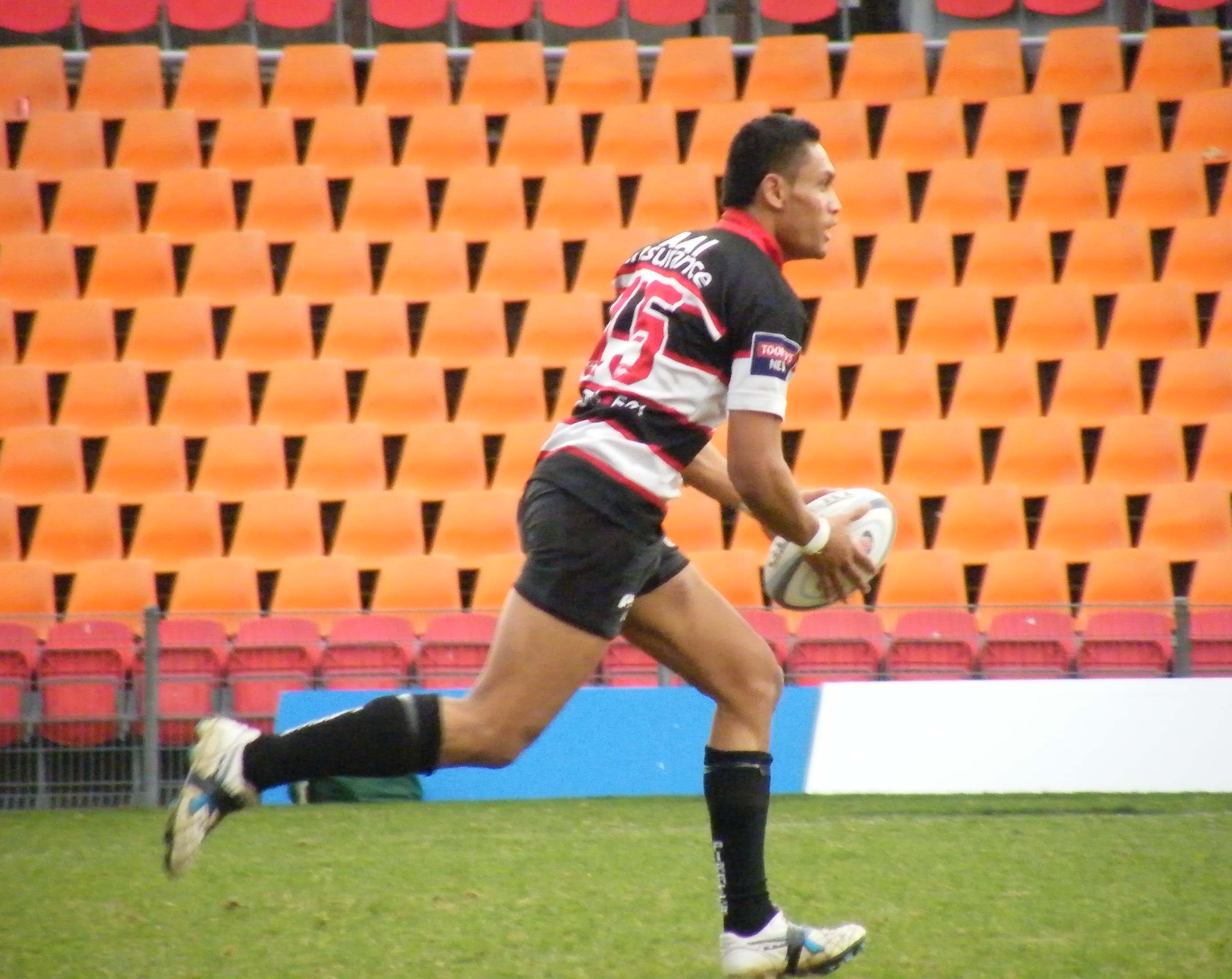

Personal information
- Full name: John Sinisa
- Born: Tonga

Playing information

Rugby league
- Position: Hooker
Club
Years	Team	Pld	T	G	FG	P
2005–06	Balmain Tigers
Representative
Years	Team	Pld	T	G	FG	P
2006	Tonga	1	1	0	0	4

Rugby union
Club
Years	Team	Pld	T	G	FG	P
2008–09	West Harbour RFC
2010–11	Stade Rodez Aveyron
2015–16	Drummoyne DRFC
	Total	0	0	0	0	0

John Sinisa is a Tongan rugby league footballer who played his club football as a hooker for the Balmain Tigers in the Premier League.

== Background ==
Sinisa was born in Tonga.

== Career ==
Sinisa has also appeared on several occasions for the Tonga national rugby league team with his most recent international games coming during the 2006 Federation Shield competition.

In 2010 he joined Stade Rodez Aveyron. He renewed his contract in 2011.

In August 2021 Sinisa was appointed coach for the Drummoyne DRFC Seniors.
