= Esera Puleitu =

- Born: 15 November 1975 (age 50) Auckland, New Zealand

Rugby union career
- Position: Flyhalf
Amateur team(s)
Years	Team	Apps	(Points)
1994	Onehunga High School		
1995	Auckland Institute		
1997	Marist Brothers Old Boys RFC		
Provincial / State sides
Years	Team	Apps	(Points)
1997	Auckland	3	(20)
International career
Years	Team	Apps	(Points)
1994	New Zealand Schools	2	(0)
1995	Samoa		

Esera Puleitu (born 15 November 1975) is a New Zealand born former Samoan rugby union player. He played as a fly-half. He was part of the 1995 Rugby World Cup roster, where he played against South Africa and England.
