= Stade Rodez Aveyron =

French rugby union club, based in Rodez

- Founded: 19 October 1902; 124 years ago
- Ground: Stade Paul-Lignon (Capacity: 6000)
- President: Jean Paul Barriac
- Coach: Arnaud Vercruysse
- League: Fédérale 2
- 2024–25: Fédérale 3, 1st (Promoted)

Official website
- www.sra-rodez.com

Stade Rodez Aveyron is a French rugby union club in Rodez, Aveyron. The club was founded in 1902, as Stade Ruthénois. They currently compete in the Fédérale 2 competition, the 6th division of French rugby.

== Notable former players ==
- Jean Fabre (rugby union)
- Toussaint Djehi
- Édouard Angoran
- Ismaila Lassissi
- Silvère Tian
- Mikhail Piskunov
- John Sinisa
- Pieter Myburgh
- Costel Burțilă
- Adriu Delai
- Davit Kacharava
- Sofiane Chellat
- Ionel Badiu
- Nomani Tonga
- Jeff Williams
