= Takau Lutua =

Tonga international rugby union player

- Born: 1963 (age 62–63) Haveluliku, Tonga
- School: Tupou College
- Occupation(s): Policeman, Tupou College Rugby Director

Rugby union career
- Position: Prop
Senior career
| Years | Team | Apps | (Points) |
| 1985-198? | Toloa Old Boys | | |
| 198?-1990 | Police | | |
| 1990-1999 | Toloa Old Boys | | |
International career
| Years | Team | Apps | (Points) |
| 1990-1995 | Tonga | 9 | (0) |

Takau Lutua (born Haveluliku, circa 1963) is a Tongan former rugby union player who played as prop.

== Career ==
Lutua started first his career in 1985 as member of the first Toloa Old Boys team who won the Tongan Secondary Schools Premiership. He then played for Police, where he played alongside his former Toloa team mates Tevita Vaʻenuku, ‘Eukaliti ‘Aukafolau, Tevita Palenapa and ‘Esafe Taufa. Lutua was first capped for Tonga in 1990, against Korea in Tokyo, on 15 April. He was also called up in the Ikale Tahi squad for the 1995 Rugby World Cup, where he only played the match against Ivory Coast in Rustenburg, which was also his last cap.

== Personal life ==
After working 22 years as Policeman, in 2007 he received his pension. He is married to Kato Kakala Lutua and has five children. His son, Nalesoni Lutua is the prop for the Grade 3 team.
