= Emilio Perasso =

Argentine rugby union coach

Emilio Perasso is an Argentine rugby union coach.

He was the coach of San Isidro Club for more than 25 years. He was in charge of Argentina for three times, all of them in partnership with other coaches. The first was in 1974, with Carlos Villegas and Jorge Merelle, the second was from 1976 to 1977, with Carlos Villegas, and the third in 1995, with Alejandro Petra, after the disappointing elimination at the 1995 Rugby World Cup finals Pool Stage. Perasso was considered for head coach of Argentina once again in 1999. He was also president of the Unión Argentina de Rugby, elected in 2004.
