= Justyn Cassell =

England international rugby union player

- Born: Justyn Paul Sheldon Cassell; 25 May 1967 (age 59) Reading, Berkshire, England
- School: Dulwich College

Rugby union career
- Position: Back-row forward
Amateur team(s)
Years	Team	Apps	(Points)
- Saracens
- Harlequins
- Northampton
- Marlow RUFC
International career
Years	Team	Apps	(Points)
	England	1	
National sevens team
Years	Team		Comps
1993	England		1993 Sevens World Cup

Justyn Cassell (born 25 May 1967) is a former a rugby union player who played for a number of top tier English club sides but was also known as an excellent Rugby Sevens player and in this capacity was capped for England and was part of the team that won the 1993 Rugby World Cup Sevens.

== Early life ==
Cassell was born in Reading, Berkshire and was educated at Dulwich College in London.

== Rugby union career ==
Cassell was a back-row forward who played his club rugby for a number of English club sides, his first major club being Saracens. He later joined Harlequins and then Northampton. His time with Northampton saw him into the era of the newly formed Premiership. However, his playing days were cut short in 1998 due to a knee injury.

At an international level he represented the England A squad, but was never capped as a full international. As an exponent of the Sevens form of the game he was selected for the 1993 England squad in the Sevens World Cup and he came on for Tim Rodber during the final, from which England emerged victorious.

Ten years later, Cassell played for a team of Latter Day Saints, a Northampton Saints veterans squad, who took on the Esher Expendables.

== Career outside rugby ==
Cassell went into marketing communications operating out of Piccadilly, London.
