= Akira Yoshida =

Japanese rugby union player (born 1971)

- Born: 13 August 1971 (age 55) Kyoto, Japan
- Height: 5 ft 11 in (180 cm)
- Weight: 198 lb (90 kg)

Rugby union career
- Position: Centre
Amateur team(s)
Years	Team	Apps	(Points)
- Keiko Gakuen High School
–	Kyoto Sangyo University		
Senior career
Years	Team	Apps	(Points)
1994-2006	Kobe Steel		
International career
Years	Team	Apps	(Points)
1995-2000	Japan	17	(5)

Akira Yoshida (吉田明, Yoshida Akira) (born Kyoto, 13 August 1971) is a former Japanese rugby union player who played as centre.

== Career ==
Educated at the Keiko Gakuen Junior High School, he served as captain of his college's rugby team during his high school days, finishing second at the 69th All-Japan High School Rugby Football Championship. Then, Yoshida attended Kyoto Sangyo University regularly since the first year. He was also the captain at the university's rugby team in 1993. In 1994, he joined Kobe Steel, as regular centre since his first year in the club, contributing to achieve the seventh consecutive victories in the All-Japan Rugby Company Championship and in the Japanese Championship for Kobe Steel. Yoshida also contributed to the victory of the 1999 and 2000 championships. In 1995, Yoshida was capped for the first time in the match against Romania, in the same year, he also took part in the 1995 Rugby World Cup, playing all the pool stage matches in the tournament, as well in the 1999 Rugby World Cup. He retired in February 2006, thus leaving Kobelco Steelers and Kobe Steel and became head coach of his alma mater, Kyoto Sangyo. In 2009 he took office as coach, but in February 2011 he resigned. From April 2013, Yoshida was in charge of the Nihon University Rugby Football Club, resigning as coach in the 2015 season. As of April 2016, he was appointed as head coach of Yakult Levins Rugby Football Club. Besides diffusing rugby as a part-time university lecturer, Yoshida works to train and strengthen the future generations.
