= Marcelo Urbano =

Argentine rugby union player

Marcelo Urbano (born 2 October 1965) is a former Argentine rugby union player. He played as a prop.

Urbano played for Buenos Aires Cricket & Rugby Club.

He had 7 caps for Argentina, from 1991 to 1995, without scoring. He was called for the 1995 Rugby World Cup, but he never played.
