= David Manako =

Tonga international rugby union player

- Born: Tevita Manako; 11 November 1971 (age 55) Tonga

Rugby union career
- Position: Centre
Amateur team(s)
Years	Team	Apps	(Points)
- Waipapa
–	Hikurangi		
Provincial / State sides
Years	Team	Apps	(Points)
1993-1995	Auckland	32	(145)
International career
Years	Team	Apps	(Points)
1993	New Zealand Divisional XV	5	(25)
1995–2000	Tonga	4	(15)

Tevita Manako, also known as David Manako (born 11 November 1971) is a Tongan former rugby union player who played as centre and wing.

== Career ==
Manako started playing rugby for Northland in the National Provincial Championship, playing there between 1993 and 1995. This included appearing at wing for North Auckland against the 1993 British and Irish Lions, the first game of the Lions' 1993 New Zealand tour. His debut for Tonga was on 11 February 1995, against Japan, in Nagoya. He was also part of the Tonga 1995 Rugby World Cup squad, but he never played any match at the tournament. Manako's last cap for Tonga was on 3 June 2000, against Japan, in Tokyo. He also played for New Zealand Divisional Team in 1993 and was an All Black trialist in the same year, playing for the Possibles.
