= Diego Scaglia =

Diego Scaglia (born 29 July 1967 in Córdoba, Argentina) is an Argentine-Italian former rugby union player and a current coach. He played as a lock.

Scaglia first played for La Tablada, in Argentina, from 1986 to 1994. He moved to Tarvisium, in Italy, for the season of 1994/95, being assigned to Benetton Treviso the following season. He played at Benetton Rugby Treviso, from 1995/96 to 2000/01, winning 4 Italian Championship titles, in 1995/96, 1997/98, 1998/99 and 2000/01, and the Cup of Italy, in 1997/98. His final team was Silea, where he played from 2001/02 to 2002/03.

He adopted Italian citizenship because of his ancestry, which made him eligible to play for Italy. He had 6 caps, from 1994 to 1999, scoring 1 try, 5 points on aggregate. He was called for the 1995 Rugby World Cup, but he never played.

After finishing his player career, he became a coach, being in charge of Tarvisium, from 2004/05 to 2006/07, and of Italy national team in the U-18 category, from 2008 to 2010.
