= David Feao =

Tonga international rugby union player

- Full name: David Feao
- Born: 10 June 1990 (age 36) Brisbane, Australia
- Height: 1.79 m (5 ft 10 in)
- Weight: 128 kg (20 st 2 lb; 282 lb)
- School: Brisbane State High School
- Notable relative: Willie Feʻao (father)

Rugby union career
- Position: Prop
Senior career
Years	Team	Apps	(Points)
2014	Brisbane City	8	(0)
2015	NSW Country Eagles	5	(5)
2016–2017	La Rochelle	16	(0)
2018	Narbonne	11	(5)
2018–2019	Leicester Tigers	12	(5)
- Correct as of 15 May 2019
International career
Years	Team	Apps	(Points)
2010	Tonga U20	4	(0)
2018	Tonga	3	(0)
- Correct as of 23 June 2018

David Feao (born 6 October 1990) is a rugby union player who plays at prop for Tonga. He has previously played for Leicester Tigers in England's Premiership Rugby.

== Family and early life ==
David Feao was born in Brisbane, Australia. He attended Brisbane State High School and was selected for the Australian Schoolboys rugby team in 2008. Feao played his club rugby for Souths in Brisbane. His father, Willie Feao, had played for Tonga at the 1995 Rugby World Cup.

== Rugby career ==
As a 19-year-old, Feao played in the 2009 Queensland Premier Rugby grand final for Souths Rugby Club, where the team was runner-up to Brothers. The following year he played for the Tonga U-20 team at the 2010 Junior World Championship.

In 2014, Feao was selected for Tonga A in the Pacific Rugby Cup. Later that season he played for the Brisbane City team that won Australia's inaugural National Rugby Championship. He transferred to the NSW Country Eagles in 2015 before signing a short-term contract with French club La Rochelle, initially for the final three months of the 2015–16 season, then extended for a further season.

He played for the Pro D2 side, Narbonne as a medical joker from January 2018, before joining Leicester Tigers in August 2018. Feao made his Leicester debut on 1 September 2019 against Exeter Chiefs, and scored his only try for the club in a 2018-19 Premiership Rugby Cup defeat against Saracens on 28 October 2018. On 15 May 2019 he was announced as one of the players to leave Leicester following the end of the 2018-19 Premiership Rugby season.
