= Bruce Ferguson (rugby union) =

Japan international rugby union player

- Born: July 25, 1969 (age 57) Suva, Fiji
- Height: 5 ft 11 in (1.80 m)
- Weight: 201 lb (91 kg)

Rugby union career
- Position: Lock
Senior career
Years	Team	Apps	(Points)
1991-1994	Hino Motors		
1994-1997	Kobelco Steelers		
International career
Years	Team	Apps	(Points)
1993-1996	Japan	17	(0)
National sevens team
Years	Team		Comps
1996-1997	Japan 7s		81997

Bruce Ferguson (born Suva, 25 July 1969) is a former Fijian-born Japanese rugby union player. He played as a lock.

== Career ==
His first international cap for Japan was against Wales, at the Cardiff Arms Park, on October 16, 1993. He was part of the 1995 Rugby World Cup roster, where he played four matches. His last cap was against Canada, at Vancouver, on July 13, 1996. He played also for Hino Motors and then, Kobe Steel in the Top League.
