= Sione Latu =

Japan & Tonga international rugby union player

- Born: Sione-Tupoumalohi Latu Mailangi; February 23, 1971 (age 55) Tonga
- Height: 188 cm (6 ft 2 in)
- Weight: 100 kg (220 lb)

Rugby union career
- Position: Number 8
Amateur team(s)
Years	Team	Apps	(Points)
- Daito Bunka University RFC
Senior career
Years	Team	Apps	(Points)
1992-1996	Sanyo		
International career
Years	Team	Apps	(Points)
- Tonga
1992-1995	Japan	9	(20)

Sione Latu (born February 23, 1971) is a former Tongan-born Japanese rugby player. He played as a number 8. He also played for Tonga and Japan XV. He is not related with fellow Japan national rugby union player Sinali Latu.

== Career ==
His first cap for Japan was during a match against Hong Kong, at Seoul, on September 26, 1992. He was also part of the 1995 Rugby World Cup, where he played two matches, against Wales and Ireland. After the tournament, he retired. He also played for Sanyo.
