= Fololisi Masila =

- Born: Penina Fololisi Masila; 1967 (age 58–59) Tonga
- Height: 5 ft 9 in (175 cm)
- Weight: 213 lb (97 kg)
- Occupation: Water board officer

Rugby union career
- Position: Hooker
Provincial / State sides
Years	Team	Apps	(Points)
1990-19??	ʻEua		
19??-1998	Kolomotu'a		
International career
Years	Team	Apps	(Points)
1990-1998	Tonga	11	(14)

Penina Fololisi Masila (born circa 1967) is a Tongan former rugby union player who played as hooker.

== Career ==
Masila's first international cap for Tonga was on 8 April 1990, against Japan at Chichibunomiya Rugby Stadium, Tokyo. He was also part of the Tonga squad for the 1995 Rugby World Cup, where he only played in the match against France in Pretoria, on 26 May 1995. His last cap for Tonga was against Australia in Canberra, on 22 September 1998.
