= Ricardo Paganini =

Argentine rugby union player

- Born: Rosario, Santa Fe, Argentina

Rugby union career
- Position: Coach
Senior career
| Years | Team | Apps | (Points) |
- Rosario Jockey Club
Coaching career
- Years: Team
- 1995: Argentina
- 2001-2005: Argentina 7s

Ricardo Paganini is an Argentine former rugby union player and coach. He was born in Rosario and is an orthopaedic surgeon.

Paganini played for Rosario Jockey Club. He would be the team coach for nine seasons, being Rosario Champion for six times.

He formed with Alejandro Petra a partnership of the two head coaches of Argentina at the 1995 Rugby World Cup finals. He was replaced by Emilio Perasso after the disappointing performance at the competition. He was assistant coach for the Argentina Sevens, from 1997 to 2001, and head coach from 2001 to 2005.

Paganini currently holds the offices of vice-president of the Unión Argentina de Rugby and president of the CONSUR. He is also a member of the International Rugby Board (IRB) Council.
