= Feleti Mahoni =

Tonga international rugby union player

- Born: April 6, 1973 (age 53) Ma'ufanga, Nuku'alofa, Tongatapu
- Height: 194 cm (6 ft 4 in)
- Weight: 103 kg (227 lb)

Rugby union career
- Position: Flanker
Senior career
Years	Team	Apps	(Points)
1992-1996	Fasi Ma'ufanga		
1997-2004	Secom		
International career
Years	Team	Apps	(Points)
1993-1999	Tonga	13	(15)
National sevens team
Years	Team		Comps
1992-1993	Tonga 7s		1993

Feleti Mahoni (born Ma'ufanga, Nuku'alofa, 6 April 1973) is a Tongan former rugby union player who played as flanker.

== Career ==
Mahoni debuted for the Tonga during the match against Samoa in Nuku'alofa, on 29 May 1993. He was also part of the 1995 Rugby World Cup squad coached by Fakahau Valu, however Mahoni only played the match against France, in Pretoria, where he was mistakenly sent off by the referee when his teammate Falamani Mafi stomped French player Philippe Benetton. Although not being called up in the 1999 Rugby World Cup squad, Mahoni still played for the 'Ikale Tahi, with his final cap being against Japan, in Tokyo, on 8 May 1999. At club level, Mahoni played for Fasi Ma'ufanga between 1992 and 1996, and then, he moved to Japan to play for Secom Rugguts until his retirement in 2004. He also played for Tonga in the inaugural Rugby World Cup Sevens in 1993.
