= Etuini Talakai =

Tonga international rugby union player

- Born: Edwin Talakai; 1 March 1970 (age 56) Tonga
- Height: 6 ft 2 in (188 cm)
- Weight: 275 lb (125 kg)
- School: Wesley College

Rugby union career
- Position: Prop
Amateur team(s)
Years	Team	Apps	(Points)
1991-1997	Suburbs		
Provincial / State sides
Years	Team	Apps	(Points)
1992	Hawke's Bay	3	(0)
1995	Auckland		
International career
Years	Team	Apps	(Points)
1992-1996	Tonga	28	(0)

Etuini Talakai, known also by his anglicised name Edwin Talakai (born 1 March 1970) is a Tongan former rugby union player who played as prop.

== Career ==
Talakai debuted for Tonga 1992, tour to NZ with games with Taranaki, King Country, Thames Valley, North Harbour. Super 10, Canterbury at Christchurch and Auckland at Tonga, Tour to Australia with games against New South Wales, ACT and test with Australia. Tours to Western Samoa and tour to American Samoa 1993. 29 May 1993, during a match against Western Samoa at Nuku'alofa. He was present in the 'Ikale Tahi squad for the 1995 Rugby World Cup, playing two matches against Scotland and Ivory Coast. His last test cap for Tonga was against Fiji, in Suva, on 15 July 1995. He also played for Hawke's Bay and for Auckland in the National Provincial Championship.
