= Feleti Fakaongo =

Tonga international rugby union player

- Born: Alifeleti Fakaongo; 16 August 1970 (age 56) Vava'u, Tonga
- Height: 1.96
- Weight: 115 kg (254 lb)

Rugby union career
- Position(s): Lock, Flanker
Amateur team(s)
Years	Team	Apps	(Points)
1994-1999	Tihoi		
1999-2004	Kumeu		
Senior career
Years	Team	Apps	(Points)
1996-1999	Secom Rugguts		
1999-2004	Bordeaux-Begles	6	(5)
2004-2005	FC Grenoble	23	(25)
2005-2008	Oyonnax Rugby	63	(25)
2008-2009	RC Chalon	14	(0)
2010-2011	Valence		
Provincial / State sides
Years	Team	Apps	(Points)
1994	King Country	2	(0)
1999	North Harbour	6	(0)
International career
Years	Team	Apps	(Points)
1993-2002	Tonga	14	(0)

Feleti Fakaongo (born 16 August 1970 in Vava'u) is a Tongan former rugby union player. He played as lock and flanker.

== Career ==
His first cap for Tonga was against Scotland, at Nuku'alofa, on 5 June 1993. He was also part of the 1995 Rugby World Cup squad, playing only against Ivory Coast in the tournament. His last international cap was against Samoa, at Nuku'alofa, on 15 June 2002. At club level he played for King Country and North Harbour in the National Provincial Championship in New Zealand, as well for FC Grenoble, Bordeaux-Begles Oyonnax RugbyRC Chalon and ROC La Voulte-Valence in France.
