= Takashi Akatsuka =

Japanese rugby union player

- Born: September 8, 1973 (age 53) Osaka, Japan
- Height: 193 cm (6 ft 4 in)
- Weight: 120 kg (265 lb)
- School: Josho Gakuen High School
- University: Meiji University

Rugby union career
- Position: Lock
Amateur team(s)
Years	Team	Apps	(Points)
- Josho Gakuen High School
–	Meiji University RFC		
Senior career
Years	Team	Apps	(Points)
1985-2005	Kubota		
International career
Years	Team	Apps	(Points)
1994-2006	Japan	6	(10)

Takashi Akatsuka (赤塚 隆, Akatsuka Takashi) (born Osaka, 8 September 1973), is a former Japanese rugby union player. He played as lock.

== Career ==
Originally from Osaka, Akatsuka was educated at Meiji University and played for Kubota, winning the promotions to Kanto League 3 in 1985, Kanto League 2 in 1991 and Kanto League 1 in 1995. Along with his teammate Hideki Nishida, he was the first Kubota player to play internationally for Japan. Akatsuka was first capped in 1994, during the match against Fiji, at Ehime, on 8 May 1994. He also took part at the 1995 Rugby World Cup, where he played only in the match against New Zealand, in Bloemfontein. After a nine years void, he was called in the Japanese national team by the then-coach Jean-Pierre Élissalde in 2005. Akatsuka last played for Japan against Korea, in Hong Kong, on 25 November 2006.
