= Lolani Koko =

Samoa dual-code rugby international footballer

Personal information
- Born: 2 October 1963
- Died: 18 June 2024 (aged 60)

Playing information
- Height: 191 cm (6 ft 3 in)
- Weight: 100 kg (15 st 10 lb)

Rugby union
- Position: Centre
Representative
Years	Team	Pld	T	G	FG	P
	Moata'a; Wellington
1983–94	Samoa	23	2	0	0	8

Rugby league
- Position: Wing
Club
Years	Team	Pld	T	G	FG	P
1995	Sydney City Roosters	0	0	0	0	0
Representative
Years	Team	Pld	T	G	FG	P
1995	Western Samoa	1	0	0	0	0

Lolani Koko (2 October 1963 – 18 June 2024) was a Samoan rugby union and rugby league footballer who played in the 1980s and 1990s. He played representative rugby union for Samoa and representative rugby league for Western Samoa, including at the 1995 Rugby League World Cup.

Koko also completed internationally in track as a 100m sprinter in the 1982 Commonwealth Games and captained Western Samoa in football in the 1994 Polynesia Cup.

== Rugby union career ==
Koko played for the Samoa national rugby union team, making his debut in 1983. He moved to New Zealand in the early 1990s, playing for Wellington. He was invited to trial for the All Blacks but decided to stick with his native Samoa. Koko scored 11 tries for Wellington in the 1992 NPC season. He was named the Man of Honour at the 1993 Hong Kong Sevens.

Koko also spent time with the Boroondara Rugby Club in Australia.

== Rugby league career ==
Koko switched to rugby league at the start of the 1995 season. Koko joined the Sydney City Roosters in the Australian Rugby League competition and led the Western Samoa team at the 1995 World Sevens. Koko also had a stint with the Narrandera Lizards in Group 20 Rugby League.

He was part of the Western Samoa squad at the 1995 World Cup.

== Personal life ==
Koko's brother Kofe Koko also represented Samoa in rugby union and his nephew Ali Koko also represented both Samoa and Wellington in rugby union. Koko died on 18 June 2024.
