= Ismaila Lassissi =

Ivorian rugby union player

- Born: September 11, 1969 (age 57)
- Height: 1.88 m (6 ft 2 in)
- Weight: 103 kg (227 lb)

Rugby union career
- Position: Loose forward
International career
Years	Team	Apps	(Points)
1993-1995	Côte d'Ivoire	8	(0)

Ismaila Lassissi, sometimes also spelled Isimaila Lassissi (born 11 September 1969), is a former Ivorian rugby union footballer. He played as a flanker and as a number eight.

He played for Burotic Abidjan, in Ivory Coast and for Stade Rodez Aveyron and Castres Olympique, in France. He earned 8 caps for the Ivory Coast national team, from 1993 to 1995, without ever scoring. He was a member of the Ivorian Squad at the 1995 Rugby World Cup finals, playing in all the three games. Lassissi has not since been selected for his National Team.
