= Penieli Latu =

Tonga international rugby union player

- Born: 20 February 1973 (age 53) Tonga
- Notable relative: Sinali Latu (brother)

Rugby union career
- Position: Centre
Amateur team(s)
Years	Team	Apps	(Points)
2002-2005	Celtic RFC		
Senior career
Years	Team	Apps	(Points)
1994-1996	Vaheloto		
1996-1998	Secom Rugguts		
Provincial / State sides
Years	Team	Apps	(Points)
2002-2005	South Canterbury		
International career
Years	Team	Apps	(Points)
1994-1995	Tonga	9	

Penieli Latu (born 20 February 1973) is a former Tongan rugby union player. He represented Tonga at the 1995 Rugby World Cup. He earned 9 caps for Tonga from 1994 to 1995. He debuted against Samoa on 4 June 1994. His last match was against Fiji a year later on 15 July.

He played for South Canterbury's Celtic Rugby Club alongside his three younger brothers. He is the younger brother of former dual international Sinali Latu.
