= Unuoi Vaʻenuku =

Tonga international rugby union player

Unuoi Va`enuku
- Born: April 5, 1976 (age 50) Tonga

Rugby union career
- Position: Centre
Senior career
Years	Team	Apps	(Points)
199?-199?	Kolofo'ou		
International career
Years	Team	Apps	(Points)
1995	Tonga	3	(0)

Unuoi Va`enuku (born 5 April 1976) is a Tongan former rugby union player. He played as centre.

== Career ==
Va`enuku debuted for Tonga during the 1995 Rugby World Cup, playing all the three pool stage matches, being his first cap against France in Pretoria. His last cap for Tonga was during the third pool stage match against Ivory Coast in Rustenburg.
