= Danny Kaleopa =

Samoan rugby union player (born 1966)

- Born: 3 May 1966 (age 60) Samoa
- Height: 6 ft 0 in (1.83 m)
- Weight: 209 lb (95 kg)

Rugby union career
- Position: Flanker
Amateur team(s)
Years	Team	Apps	(Points)
1995	Te Atatu		
2000–2003	Waitakere City		
Senior career
Years	Team	Apps	(Points)
1996–2000	Nippon Steel		
Provincial / State sides
Years	Team	Apps	(Points)
1990-1994	Canterbury		
1995	Auckland	6	(5)
International career
Years	Team	Apps	(Points)
1990–1993	Samoa	7	(12)

Danny K. Kaleopa (born 3 May 1966) is a former Samoan rugby union player. He played as a flanker. He played for Auckland, Nippon Steel, and Waitakere City. He also played for the Hawaii Harlequins from Hawai'i.

== Career ==
His debut with Western Samoa was during a test match against Korea at Tokyo, on 8 April 1990. He was part of the 1991 Rugby World Cup roster. His last international appearance was in a test match against Fiji at Apia, on 5 June 1993. In 1993, he played for the Samoa national team at the first ever Rugby World Cup Sevens, taking part in a series of test matches on 28 March 1993, when the teams of New Zealand (24-14) and Fiji (14-12) were defeated, and in the game against the New Zealanders, he scored several tries.

== After career ==
In 2011, after Samoa's disastrous performance at the World Cup in New Zealand, Kaleopa supported team captain Mahonri Schwalger, who called for reforms in the Samoa Rugby Union and to understand the reasons for the Samoan failures. The reason for Schwalger's indignation was the scandalous behavior of the national team manager Mathew Vaea, who was fired from the national team for drunkenness and neglection of duty at the World Cup.

His daughter is the New Zealand swimmer Gabrielle Fa'amausili.
