= Taipe ʻIsitolo =

Tonga international rugby union player

Taipe 'Isitolo
- Born: Taipe Vave 'Isitolo; 1971 (age 54–55) Tonga

Rugby union career
- Position: Fullback
Senior career
Years	Team	Apps	(Points)
199?–199?	Kolofo'ou		
International career
Years	Team	Apps	(Points)
1993–1995	Tonga	3	(10)

Taipe Vave 'Isitolo (born in 1971) is a Tongan former rugby union player who played as fullback.

== Career ==
Before starting his rugby union career, 'Isitolo was part of the Tonga national football team which visited Bergamo in 1991 to play three matches against Atalanta.

'Isitolo debuted for Tonga on 3 June 1995, during the pool stage match of the 1995 Rugby World Cup against Ivory Coast in Rustenburg, being his only appearance in the tournament. His last cap for Tonga was on 15 July 1995 against Fiji in Suva.
