= Fernando del Castillo =

Argentine rugby union player

- Born: January 16, 1971 (age 55) Rosario
- Height: 5 ft 7 in (1.70 m)
- Weight: 172 lb (78 kg; 12 st 4 lb)

Rugby union career
- Position: Centre
Amateur team(s)
Years	Team	Apps	(Points)
- Jockey Club de Rosario
International career
Years	Team	Apps	(Points)
1995-1998	Argentina	6	(0)
National sevens team
Years	Team		Comps
- Argentina 7s

Fernando (Darda) del Castillo (born Rosario, 16 January 1971) is a former Argentine rugby union player. He played as a centre.

He played for Jockey Club de Rosario.

He had 6 caps for Argentina, from 1995 to 1998, without ever scoring. He had his debut at the 29–26 win over Canada, for the Pan American Championship, at 10 March 1995, in Buenos Aires. He was called for the 1995 Rugby World Cup, but never left the bench. His last game was at the 55–0 win over Uruguay, for the 1999 Rugby World Cup qualifyings, at 18 August 1998, in Buenos Aires.
