= Simana Mafileo =

- Born: 14 September 1969 Tonga
- Died: 9 August 2022
- Height: 6 ft 1 in (185 cm)
- Weight: 209 lb (95 kg)

Rugby union career
- Position: Centre
Amateur team(s)
| Years | Team | Apps | (Points) |
| 1991-1992 | Arataki | | |
| 1996-1997 | North Shore | | |
Senior career
| Years | Team | Apps | (Points) |
| 1998-2004 | Kubota Spears | | |
Provincial / State sides
| Years | Team | Apps | (Points) |
| 1991-1992 | Bay of Plenty | | |
| 1996-1997 | North Harbour | | |
| 1997 | Northland | | |
International career
| Years | Team | Apps | (Points) |
| 1995-2003 | Tonga | 22 | (10) |
National sevens team
| Years | Team | | Comps |
| 2003-04 | Japan 7s | | 2001-02 |

Simana "Joe" Mafileo (born 14 September 1969) is a Tongan former rugby union player. He played as centre.

== Career ==
Mafileo debuted for Tonga in the 1995 Rugby World Cup, playing only against Ivory Coast, at Rustenburg. He also played for Tonga Sevens in the first Rugby World Cup Sevens in 1993 and for Japan Sevens in the 2001-02 World Sevens Series. His last international cap for tonga was during the match against Fiji, at Nadi, on 4 July 2003. At club level, he played for Bay of Plenty, North Harbour, Northland and Kubota Spears.
