= Tevita Vaʻenuku =

Tongan rugby union player

- Born: December 27, 1967 (age 58) Tonga
- Height: 5 ft 9 in (175 cm)
- Weight: 176 lb (80 kg)
- School: Tupou College
- Occupation: Police officer

Rugby union career
- Position: Wing
Senior career
Years	Team	Apps	(Points)
1991-1994	Police		
1994-1995	Kolofo'ou		
International career
Years	Team	Apps	(Points)
1991-1995	Tonga	15	(24)

Tevita Vaʻenuku (born 27 December 1967) is a Tongan former rugby union player. He played as wing.

== Career ==
Vaʻenuku debuted for Tonga on 28 May 1991, against Samoa in Nuku'alofa. He was also part of the Tonga national team in the 1995 Rugby World Cup, playing all the three pool stage matches, scoring a try against France in Pretoria. His last cap for Tonga was during the third pool stage match against Ivory Coast in Rustenburg. Vaʻenuku was also part of the 1993 and 1997 Rugby World Cup Sevens squads. In 2005, Vaʻenuku was part of the Ikale Tahi management team, along with Sione Petelo, Nafe Tufui and Semi Taupeaafe.
