= Sinali Latu =

Japan & Tonga international rugby union player

- Born: Sinali-Tui Latu; August 22, 1965 (age 61) Ha'apai
- Notable relative(s): Penieli Latu (brother); Kruger Latu (son)

Rugby union career
- Position: No. 8
Senior career
| Years | Team | Apps | (Points) |
| 1985-1995 | Sanyo | | |
International career
| Years | Team | Apps | (Points) |
| 1987-1995 | Japan | 32 | (18) |
| 1984 | Tonga | 2 | (0) |
National sevens team
| Years | Team | | Comps |
| 1991-1993 | Japan 7s | | 1993 5 |
Coaching career
- Years: Team
- 2003-: Daito Bunka University

Sinali Latu (born in Tonga in 1965) is a retired Tongan-Japanese rugby union player. He played in Japan for Sanyo and also played for the Japan national rugby union team. Now he coaches the Daito Bunka University rugby team. Since he acquired the Japanese citizenship, he changed his full name to William Sinali Latu (ラトゥ ウィリアム志南利, Ratu Uiriamu Shinari). He is the founder of the non-profit organisation Japan-Tonga Friendship Association. He was nicknamed "Bill" (ビル) during his playing career in Japan.

Viliami Sinali Latu played for Tonga's national side while attending Tonga College at the age of 19. He moved to study and play in Japan with a Tonga College school mate, Uatesoni Namoa. Latu played for Japan at three World Cups, in 1987, 1991 and in 1995.

== Family ==
Latu's younger brother, Tevita Latu, played sevens for Tonga while studying in Tonga College in 2000 before moving to New Zealand. The youngest of the Latu brothers, Kilifi, has captained the Tongan sevens team and played rugby in New Zealand, together with his older brothers Penieli and Langakali, and in the United States. Penieli played for Tonga in the 1995 World Cup. The Latu brothers all studied at Tonga College. They all played for South Canterbury's Celtic Rugby Club.
