= Fakahau Valu =

Tongan rugby union footballer and coach

- Born: Fakahau Valu; July 1, 1950 (age 76) Fo'ui, Tongatapu. Tonga
- Height: 185 cm (6 ft 1 in)
- School: Tupou College
- Notable relative: Asaeli Ai Valu (son)

Rugby union career
- Position: Flanker
Senior career
Years	Team	Apps	(Points)
- Hihifo Rugby Club
1973–1987	Toloa Old Boys		
International career
Years	Team	Apps	(Points)
1973–1987	Tonga	25	(24)
Coaching career
- Years: Team
- 1995: Tonga

Fakahau Valu (born July 1, 1950) is a former Tongan rugby union player. He played as a flanker.

== Career ==
He made his debut against the Māori All Blacks in 1973. Valu captained Tonga at the 1987 Rugby World Cup, he played his last game against Ireland. He was a member of the Tongan squad that handed Australia a shocking 16–11 defeat on June 30, 1973, at Ballymore Stadium.

He coached Tonga at the 1995 Rugby World Cup.

== After career ==
In 2009, Valu was inducted into IRB's Pathway of Fame. In 2008, Valu was awarded with the Order of Queen Sālote Tupou III and a year later, he was inducted to the Tongan National Sports Hall of Fame along with Kitione Lave, Paea Wolfgram, Taufa'ahau Tupou IV, Tali Kavapalu and Motuliki Kailahi. Valu is also a member of the organising committee for the 2019 Pacific Games.

== Personal life ==
His son, Asaeli Ai Valu is also a rugby union player, who represents Japan at international level.

== Honours ==
National honours

- Order of Queen Sālote Tupou III, Commander (31 July 2008).
