= 1999 Rugby World Cup squads =

This article lists the official squads for the 1999 Rugby World Cup in Wales.

== Pool A ==
=== Scotland ===
Head coach: (Scotland) Jim Telfer

Note: Flags indicate national union for the club/province as defined by World Rugby.

Player	Position	Date of birth (age)	Caps	Club/province
Gordon Bulloch	Hooker	26 March 1975 (aged 24)	15	(Scotland) Glasgow Warriors
Robbie Russell	Hooker	1 May 1976 (aged 23)	1	(England) Saracens F.C.
Paul Burnell	Prop	29 September 1965 (aged 34)	49	(England) London Scottish F.C.
George Graham	Prop	19 January 1966 (aged 33)	8	(England) Newcastle Falcons
Tom Smith	Prop	31 October 1971 (aged 27)	10	(France) CA Brive
Dave Hilton	Prop	3 April 1970 (aged 29)	35	(Scotland) Glasgow Warriors
Stuart Grimes	Lock	4 April 1974 (aged 25)	15	(England) Newcastle Falcons
Doddie Weir	Lock	4 July 1970 (aged 29)	54	(England) Newcastle Falcons
Scott Murray	Lock	15 January 1976 (aged 23)	14	(England) Saracens F.C.
Andy Reed	Lock	4 May 1969 (aged 30)	17	(England) London Wasps
Martin Leslie	Flanker	25 October 1971 (aged 27)	7	(Scotland) Edinburgh Rugby
Cameron Mather	Flanker	20 August 1973 (aged 26)	1	(Scotland) Edinburgh Rugby
Stuart Reid	Flanker	30 January 1970 (aged 29)	3	(Scotland) Edinburgh Rugby
Budge Pountney	Flanker	13 November 1973 (aged 25)	7	(England) Northampton Saints
Peter Walton	Flanker	3 June 1969 (aged 30)	20	(England) Newcastle Falcons
Gordon Simpson	Number 8	21 September 1971 (aged 28)	4	(Scotland) Glasgow Warriors
Gary Armstrong (c)	Scrum-half	30 September 1966 (aged 33)	42	(England) Newcastle Falcons
Bryan Redpath	Scrum-half	2 July 1971 (aged 28)	29	(Scotland) Melrose RFC
Iain Fairley	Scrum-half	29 August 1973 (aged 26)	2	(Scotland) Kelso RFC
Duncan Hodge	Fly-half	18 August 1974 (aged 25)	8	(Scotland) Edinburgh Rugby
Gregor Townsend	Fly-half	26 April 1973 (aged 26)	41	(France) CA Brive
Alan Tait	Centre	2 November 1964 (aged 34)	24	(Scotland) Edinburgh Rugby
John Leslie	Centre	25 November 1970 (aged 28)	6	(Scotland) Glasgow Warriors
James McLaren	Centre	28 June 1972 (aged 27)	2	(France) CS Bourgoin-Jallieu
Jamie Mayer	Centre	16 April 1977 (aged 22)	1	(England) Bristol RC
Cameron Murray	Wing	31 March 1975 (aged 24)	11	(Scotland) Edinburgh Rugby
Kenny Logan	Wing	3 April 1972 (aged 27)	41	(England) London Wasps
Shaun Longstaff	Wing	3 January 1972 (aged 27)	10	(Scotland) Glasgow Warriors
Glenn Metcalfe	Fullback	15 April 1970 (aged 29)	9	(Scotland) Glasgow Warriors
Chris Paterson	Fullback	30 March 1978 (aged 21)	0	(Scotland) Edinburgh Rugby

=== South Africa ===
Head coach: (South Africa) Nick Mallett

Note: Flags indicate national union for the club/province as defined by World Rugby.

Player	Position	Date of birth (age)	Caps	Club/province
Naka Drotské	Hooker	15 March 1971 (aged 28)	20	(South Africa) Free State
Chris Rossouw	Hooker	14 September 1969 (aged 30)	7	(South Africa) Western Province
Os du Randt	Prop	8 September 1972 (aged 27)	33	(South Africa) Free State
Ollie le Roux	Prop	10 May 1973 (aged 26)	20	(South Africa) Western Province
Adrian Garvey	Prop	25 June 1968 (aged 31)	27	(South Africa) Natal
Cobus Visagie	Prop	31 October 1973 (aged 25)	6	(South Africa) Western Province
Krynauw Otto	Lock	8 October 1971 (aged 27)	28	(South Africa) Bulls
Albert van den Berg	Lock	26 January 1974 (aged 25)	4	(South Africa) Griquas
Fritz van Heerden	Lock	29 June 1970 (aged 29)	13	(South Africa) Western Province
Mark Andrews	Lock	21 February 1972 (aged 27)	56	(South Africa) Natal
Rassie Erasmus	Flanker	5 November 1972 (aged 26)	23	(South Africa) Lions
André Venter	Flanker	14 November 1970 (aged 28)	39	(South Africa) Western Province
André Vos	Flanker	9 January 1975 (aged 24)	5	(South Africa) Lions
Bobby Skinstad	Flanker	3 July 1976 (aged 23)	10	(South Africa) Western Province
Ruben Kruger	Flanker	30 March 1970 (aged 29)	34	(South Africa) Bulls
Anton Leonard	Number 8	31 May 1974 (aged 25)	1	(South Africa) SW-Districts
Joost van der Westhuizen (c)	Scrum-half	20 February 1971 (aged 28)	52	(South Africa) Bulls
Werner Swanepoel	Scrum-half	15 April 1973 (aged 26)	13	(South Africa) Lions
Henry Honiball	Fly-half	1 December 1965 (aged 33)	33	(South Africa) Sharks
Jannie de Beer	Fly-half	22 April 1971 (aged 28)	8	(South Africa) Free State
Wayne Julies	Centre	23 October 1978 (aged 20)	0	(South Africa) Boland
Robbie Fleck	Centre	17 July 1975 (aged 24)	6	(South Africa) Western Province
Pieter Muller	Centre	5 May 1969 (aged 30)	29	(South Africa) Natal
Kaya Malotana	Centre	30 May 1976 (aged 23)	0	(South Africa) Border
Brendan Venter	Centre	29 December 1969 (aged 29)	15	(South Africa) Free State
Breyton Paulse	Wing	25 April 1976 (aged 23)	5	(South Africa) Western Province
Pieter Rossouw	Wing	3 December 1971 (aged 27)	29	(South Africa) Western Province
Deon Kayser	Wing	3 July 1970 (aged 29)	4	(South Africa) Eastern Province
Percy Montgomery	Fullback	15 March 1974 (aged 25)	29	(South Africa) Western Province
Stefan Terblanche	Fullback	2 July 1975 (aged 24)	17	(South Africa) Natal

=== Spain ===
Head coach: (Spain) Alfonso Feijoo

Note: Flags indicate national union for the club/province as defined by World Rugby.

Player	Position	Date of birth (age)	Caps	Club/province
Fernando de la Calle	Hooker	8 August 1970 (aged 29)	37	(Spain) Quesos Entrepinares
Diego Zarzosa	Hooker	25 December 1975 (aged 23)	9	(Spain) Dulciora El Salvador
Jordi Camps	Prop	5 May 1973 (aged 26)	25	(Spain) U.E. Santboiana
José Ignacio Zapatero	Prop	25 November 1971 (aged 27)	14	(Spain) Dulciora El Salvador
Víctor Torres	Prop	31 January 1967 (aged 32)	11	(Spain) U.E. Santboiana
Luis Javier Martínez	Prop	12 July 1971 (aged 28)	6	(Spain) Oviedo Rugby
José Miguel Villaú	Lock	30 October 1971 (aged 27)	31	(France) Stade Montois
Steve Tuineau	Lock	20 September 1969 (aged 30)	11	(Spain) U.E. Santboiana
Sergio Souto	Lock	4 November 1976 (aged 22)	3	(Spain) Oviedo Rugby
Alberto Malo (c)	Flanker	3 April 1964 (aged 35)	57	(Spain) U.E. Santboiana
Carlos Souto	Flanker	4 November 1976 (aged 22)	14	(Spain) Oviedo Rugby
Oscar Astarloa	Flanker	6 September 1974 (aged 25)	9	(France) Bayonne
José Díaz	Flanker	31 March 1963 (aged 36)	7	(France) Castres Olympique
Agustín Malet	Number 8	7 July 1967 (aged 32)	5	(Spain) CD Universidad de Sevilla
Alfonso Mata	Number 8	14 March 1976 (aged 23)	4	(Spain) Dulciora El Salvador
Aratz Gallastegui	Scrum-half	4 September 1976 (aged 23)	11	(Spain) Getxo Artea RT
Jaime Alonso	Scrum-half	29 April 1973 (aged 26)	4	(Spain) Dulciora El Salvador
Andrei Kovalenco	Fly-half	12 July 1971 (aged 28)	9	(Spain) CRC Madrid
Aitor Etxeberría	Fly-half	21 February 1976 (aged 23)	8	(Spain) Oviedo Rugby
Álvar Enciso	Centre	27 February 1974 (aged 25)	31	(Spain) Dulciora El Salvador
Fernando Díez	Centre	23 September 1974 (aged 25)	11	(Spain) CR Liceo Francés
Alberto Socías	Centre	16 May 1973 (aged 26)	9	(Spain) Valencia Tecnidex
Sébastien Loubsens	Centre	15 February 1973 (aged 26)	3	(France) Bordeaux-Begles
Raphaël Bastide	Wing	24 November 1977 (aged 21)	10	(France) U.S. Colomiers
Oriol Ripol	Wing	6 September 1975 (aged 24)	7	(Spain) U.E. Santboiana
Antonio Socías	Wing	12 July 1970 (aged 29)	6	(Spain) Valencia Tecnidex
José Ignacio Inchausti	Wing	1 January 1973 (aged 26)	2	(Spain) Moraleja Alcobendas Rugby Union
Miguel Ángel Frechilla	Wing	1 February 1974 (aged 25)	6	(Spain) Quesos Entrepinares
Ferran Velazco	Fullback	23 June 1976 (aged 23)	15	(Spain) U.E. Santboiana
Francisco Puertas	Fullback	8 September 1963 (aged 36)	57	(France) Saint-Jean-de-Luz

=== Uruguay ===
Head coach: (Uruguay) Daniel Herrera

Note: Flags indicate national union for the club/province as defined by World Rugby.

Player	Position	Date of birth (age)	Caps	Club/province
Francisco de los Santos	Hooker	7 May 1970 (aged 29)	23	(Uruguay) Carrasco Rugby Club
Diego Lamelas	Hooker	14 November 1972 (aged 26)	17	(Argentina) Asociación Alumni
Guillermo Storace	Prop	20 March 1974 (aged 25)	15	(Uruguay) Old Christians Club
Eduardo Berruti	Prop	15 March 1968 (aged 31)	19	(Uruguay) Old Christians Club
Rodrigo Sánchez	Prop	25 October 1976 (aged 22)	16	(Uruguay) Carrasco Rugby Club
Pablo Lemoine	Prop	1 March 1975 (aged 24)	18	(England) Bristol Rugby Club
Juan Alzueta	Lock	9 September 1975 (aged 24)	4	(Uruguay) Carrasco Rugby Club
Agustín Ponce de León	Lock	26 August 1964 (aged 35)	15	(Uruguay) Carrasco Rugby Club
Mario Lamé	Lock	30 January 1966 (aged 33)	41	(Uruguay) Carrasco Rugby Club
Juan Carlos Bado	Lock	29 December 1973 (aged 25)	32	(Uruguay) Old Boys
Leonardo de Oliveira	Lock	21 November 1975 (aged 23)	6	(Uruguay) Carrasco Rugby Club
Nicolás Grillé	Flanker	7 May 1970 (aged 29)	12	(Uruguay) Trébol Paysandu
Nicolas Brignoni	Flanker	3 September 1976 (aged 23)	11	(Uruguay) Montevideo Cricket Club
Martín Panizza	Flanker	24 July 1970 (aged 29)	39	(Uruguay) Carrasco Rugby Club
Diego Ormaechea (c)	Number 8	19 September 1959 (aged 40)	54	(Uruguay) Carrasco Rugby Club
Guillermo Laffitte	Number 8	19 May 1977 (aged 22)	5	(Uruguay) Carrasco Rugby Club
Fernando Sosa Díaz	Scrum-half	12 September 1971 (aged 28)	6	(Uruguay) Carrasco Rugby Club
Federico Sciarra	Scrum-half	14 February 1966 (aged 33)	39	(Uruguay) Carrasco Rugby Club
Diego Aguirre	Fly-half	23 September 1974 (aged 25)	28	(Uruguay) Carrasco Rugby Club
Sebastián Aguirre	Fly-half	15 July 1976 (aged 23)	10	(Uruguay) Carrasco Rugby Club
Martín Mendaro	Centre	1 August 1973 (aged 26)	28	(Uruguay) Carrasco Rugby Club
Pedro Vecino	Centre	8 March 1970 (aged 29)	35	(Uruguay) Carrasco Rugby Club
Fernando Paullier	Centre	27 October 1967 (aged 31)	22	(Uruguay) Old Christians Club
Martín Cerviño	Wing	22 April 1979 (aged 20)	3	(Uruguay) Old Christians Club
Pablo Costábile	Wing	24 April 1969 (aged 30)	21	(Uruguay) Carrasco Rugby Club
Juan Menchaca	Wing	23 July 1977 (aged 22)	2	(Uruguay) Carrasco Rugby Club
Martín Ferrés	Wing	15 January 1971 (aged 28)	24	(Uruguay) Carrasco Rugby Club
Juan Martín Marqués	Wing	8 June 1974 (aged 25)	1	(Uruguay) Carrasco Rugby Club
José Viana	Wing	2 September 1977 (aged 22)	5	(Uruguay) Old Boys
Alfonso Cardoso	Fullback	27 December 1971 (aged 27)	20	(Uruguay) Old Boys

== Pool B ==
=== England ===
Head coach: (England) Clive Woodward

Leon Lloyd and Martyn Wood were called up on 23 September as injury replacements for Kyran Bracken and David Rees.

Note: Flags indicate national union for the club/province as defined by World Rugby.

Player	Position	Date of birth (age)	Caps	Club/province
Richard Cockerill	Hooker	16 December 1970 (aged 28)	23	(England) Leicester Tigers
Neil McCarthy	Hooker	29 November 1974 (aged 24)	2	(England) Gloucester Rugby
Phil Greening	Hooker	3 October 1975 (aged 23)	8	(England) Sale Sharks
Jason Leonard	Prop	14 August 1968 (aged 31)	76	(England) Harlequins FC
Graham Rowntree	Prop	18 April 1971 (aged 28)	23	(England) Leicester Tigers
Victor Ubogu	Prop	8 September 1964 (aged 35)	24	(England) Bath Rugby
Phil Vickery	Prop	14 March 1976 (aged 23)	7	(England) Gloucester Rugby
Darren Garforth	Prop	9 April 1966 (aged 33)	21	(England) Leicester Tigers
Martin Johnson (c)	Lock	9 March 1970 (aged 29)	48	(England) Leicester Tigers
Danny Grewcock	Lock	7 November 1972 (aged 26)	12	(England) Saracens F.C.
Garath Archer	Lock	15 December 1974 (aged 24)	14	(England) Bristol Rugby
Richard Hill	Flanker	23 May 1973 (aged 26)	22	(England) Saracens F.C.
Neil Back	Flanker	16 January 1969 (aged 30)	23	(England) Leicester Tigers
Tim Rodber	Flanker	2 July 1969 (aged 30)	42	(England) Northampton Saints
Lawrence Dallaglio	Number 8	10 August 1972 (aged 27)	28	(England) London Wasps
Martin Corry	Number 8	12 October 1973 (aged 25)	8	(England) Leicester Tigers
Joe Worsley	Number 8	14 June 1977 (aged 22)	0	(England) London Wasps
Matt Dawson	Scrum-half	31 October 1972 (aged 26)	24	(England) Northampton Saints
Kyran Bracken	Scrum-half	22 November 1971 (aged 27)	23	(England) Bristol Rugby
Martyn Wood	Scrum-half	25 April 1977 (aged 22)	0	(England) London Wasps
Paul Grayson	Fly-half	30 May 1971 (aged 28)	19	(England) Northampton Saints
Jonny Wilkinson	Fly-half	25 May 1979 (aged 20)	10	(England) Newcastle Falcons
Phil de Glanville	Centre	1 October 1968 (aged 31)	34	(England) Bath Rugby
Will Greenwood	Centre	20 October 1972 (aged 26)	11	(England) Leicester Tigers
Jeremy Guscott	Centre	7 July 1965 (aged 34)	62	(England) Bath Rugby
Austin Healey	Wing	26 October 1973 (aged 25)	20	(England) Leicester Tigers
Leon Lloyd	Wing	22 September 1977 (aged 22)	0	(England) Leicester Tigers
Dan Luger	Wing	11 January 1975 (aged 24)	10	(England) Saracens F.C.
David Rees	Wing	15 October 1974 (aged 24)	11	(England) Bristol Rugby
Mike Catt	Fullback	17 September 1971 (aged 28)	36	(England) Bath Rugby
Nick Beal	Fullback	2 December 1970 (aged 28)	11	(England) Northampton Saints
Matt Perry	Fullback	27 January 1977 (aged 22)	20	(England) Bath Rugby

=== Italy ===
Head coach: (Italy) Massimo Mascioletti

Note: Flags indicate national union for the club/province as defined by World Rugby.

Player	Position	Date of birth (age)	Caps	Club/province
Stefano Saviozzi	Hooker	4 March 1975 (aged 24)	9	(Italy) Benetton Treviso
Alessandro Moscardi	Hooker	26 March 1969 (aged 30)	14	(Italy) Benetton Treviso
Andrea Moretti	Hooker	13 November 1972 (aged 26)	4	(Italy) Petrarca
Andrea Lo Cicero	Prop	7 July 1976 (aged 23)	0	(Italy) Rovigo
Alex Moreno	Prop	21 April 1973 (aged 26)	0	(France) Agen
Franco Properzi	Prop	4 November 1965 (aged 33)	48	(Italy) Benetton Treviso
Andrea Castellani	Prop	15 May 1972 (aged 27)	18	(Italy) Rugby Roma
Giampiero de Carli	Prop	17 March 1970 (aged 29)	13	(France) Stade Français
Federico Pucciariello	Prop	24 June 1975 (aged 24)	2	(Italy) Parma
Laurent Travini	Lock	24 November 1972 (aged 26)	4	(France) Dax
Carlo Checchinato	Lock	30 August 1970 (aged 29)	48	(Italy) Benetton Treviso
Walter Cristofoletto	Lock	2 June 1964 (aged 35)	27	(Italy) Benetton Treviso
Mark Giacheri	Lock	1 February 1969 (aged 30)	29	(England) West Hartlepool
Carlo Caione	Flanker	18 February 1973 (aged 26)	14	(Italy) Rugby Roma
Mauro Bergamasco	Flanker	1 May 1979 (aged 20)	3	(Italy) Petrarca
Massimo Giovanelli (c)	Flanker	1 March 1967 (aged 32)	56	(Italy) Rovigo
Orazio Arancio	Flanker	15 November 1967 (aged 31)	32	(Italy) Benetton Treviso
Andrea De Rossi	Number 8	7 August 1972 (aged 27)	2	(Italy) Livorno
Alessandro Troncon	Scrum-half	6 September 1973 (aged 26)	43	(Italy) Benetton Treviso
Giampiero Mazzi	Scrum-half	14 October 1974 (aged 24)	5	(Italy) Rugby Roma
Diego Domínguez	Fly-half	25 April 1966 (aged 33)	53	(France) Stade Français
Francesco Mazzariol	Fly-half	1 March 1975 (aged 24)	14	(Italy) Benetton Treviso
Paolo Vaccari	Centre	17 January 1971 (aged 28)	51	(Italy) Calvisano
Luca Martin	Centre	25 November 1973 (aged 25)	16	(France) Bègles-Bordeaux
Cristian Stoica	Centre	1 August 1976 (aged 23)	17	(France) Narbonne
Sandro Ceppolino	Centre	9 August 1974 (aged 25)	3	(Italy) Piacenza
Nicola Mazzucato	Wing	27 October 1975 (aged 23)	5	(Italy) Benetton Treviso
Fabio Roselli	Wing	13 April 1971 (aged 28)	15	(Italy) Rugby Roma
Nick Zisti	Wing	2 August 1972 (aged 27)	0	(Italy) Rugby Roma
Matt Pini	Fullback	21 March 1969 (aged 30)	5	(Italy) Rugby Roma

=== New Zealand ===
Head coach: (New Zealand) John Hart

Player	Position	Date of birth (age)	Caps	Franchise/province
Anton Oliver	Hooker	9 September 1975 (aged 24)	14	(New Zealand) Highlanders / Otago
Mark Hammett	Hooker	13 July 1972 (aged 27)	2	(New Zealand) Crusaders / Canterbury
Craig Dowd	Prop	26 October 1969 (aged 29)	48	(New Zealand) Blues / Auckland
Greg Feek	Prop	20 July 1975 (aged 24)	3	(New Zealand) Crusaders / Canterbury
Kees Meeuws	Prop	26 July 1974 (aged 25)	7	(New Zealand) Highlanders / Otago
Carl Hoeft	Prop	13 November 1974 (aged 24)	9	(New Zealand) Highlanders / Otago
Robin Brooke	Lock	10 December 1966 (aged 32)	57	(New Zealand) Blues / Auckland
Ian Jones	Lock	17 April 1967 (aged 32)	77	(New Zealand) Chiefs / North Harbour
Norm Maxwell	Lock	5 March 1976 (aged 23)	6	(New Zealand) Crusaders / Canterbury
Royce Willis	Lock	28 August 1975 (aged 24)	6	(New Zealand) Blues / Bay of Plenty
Andrew Blowers	Flanker	27 March 1975 (aged 24)	10	(New Zealand) Blues / Auckland
Josh Kronfeld	Flanker	20 June 1971 (aged 28)	42	(New Zealand) Highlanders / Otago
Dylan Mika	Flanker	17 April 1972 (aged 27)	5	(New Zealand) Blues / Auckland
Scott Robertson	Flanker	20 October 1975 (aged 23)	3	(New Zealand) Crusaders / Canterbury
Reuben Thorne	Flanker	2 January 1975 (aged 24)	1	(New Zealand) Crusaders / Canterbury
Taine Randell (c)	Number 8	5 November 1974 (aged 24)	25	(New Zealand) Highlanders / Otago
Byron Kelleher	Half-back	23 September 1976 (aged 23)	3	(New Zealand) Highlanders / Otago
Justin Marshall	Half-back	5 August 1973 (aged 26)	34	(New Zealand) Crusaders / Canterbury
Rhys Duggan	Half-back	31 July 1972 (aged 27)	0	(New Zealand) Chiefs / Waikato
Andrew Mehrtens	First five-eighth	28 April 1973 (aged 26)	34	(New Zealand) Crusaders / Canterbury
Tony Brown	First five-eighth	17 January 1975 (aged 24)	5	(New Zealand) Highlanders
Carlos Spencer	First five-eighth	14 October 1975 (aged 23)	12	(New Zealand) Blues / Auckland
Alama Ieremia	Centre	27 October 1970 (aged 28)	19	(New Zealand) Hurricanes / Wellington
Christian Cullen	Centre	12 February 1976 (aged 23)	35	(New Zealand) Hurricanes / Wellington
Tana Umaga	Centre	27 May 1973 (aged 26)	12	(New Zealand) Hurricanes / Wellington
Jonah Lomu	Wing	12 May 1975 (aged 24)	32	(New Zealand) Chiefs / Counties Manukau
Jeff Wilson	Wing	24 October 1973 (aged 25)	48	(New Zealand) Highlanders / Otago
Pita Alatini	Centre	11 April 1976 (aged 23)	1	(New Zealand) Highlanders / Otago
Daryl Gibson	Centre	2 March 1975 (aged 24)	6	(New Zealand) Crusaders / Canterbury
Glen Osborne	Fullback	27 August 1971 (aged 28)	18	(New Zealand) Chiefs / North Harbour

=== Tonga ===
Head coach: (Tonga) Polutele Tuʻihalamaka

Player	Position	Date of birth (age)	Caps	Franchise/province
Feʻao Vunipola	Hooker	6 January 1969 (aged 30)	28	(Wales) Pontypridd
Latiume Maka	Hooker	11 February 1970 (aged 29)	6	(Wales) Pontypridd
Taʻu Faingaʻanuku	Prop	14 July 1972 (aged 27)	1	(Wales) Pontypridd
Puke Faletau	Prop	3 October 1968 (aged 30)	9	Tonga Police
Damien Penisini	Prop	1 March 1971 (aged 28)	9	(Wales) Pontypridd
Ngalu Tau	Prop	15 January 1969 (aged 30)	17	(Wales) Pontypridd
Tevita Taumoepeau	Prop	16 May 1974 (aged 25)	4	(New Zealand) Auckland
Kuli Faletau	Lock	30 December 1963 (aged 35)	20	(Wales) Ebbw Vale
Isi Fatani	Lock	6 January 1969 (aged 30)	16	(Tonga) Toa-ko-maʻafu
Benhur Kivalu	Lock	2 September 1972 (aged 27)	9	(Japan) Kintetsu Liners
Falamani Mafi	Lock	6 March 1971 (aged 28)	19	(Japan) Yokogawa
David Edwards	Flanker	17 December 1970 (aged 28)	7	(New Zealand) Auckland
Jonathan Koloi	Flanker	2 July 1972 (aged 27)	8	(Tonga) Toa-ko-maʻafu
Matt Te Pou	Flanker	27 August 1973 (aged 26)	8	(South Africa) Gauteng Falcons
Katilimoni Tuʻipulotu	Flanker	5 December 1967 (aged 31)	11	(Tonga) Toa-ko-Maʻafu
Vaʻa Toloke	Number 8	24 August 1974 (aged 25)	11	(Japan) Kubota Spears
Sililo Martens	Scrum-half	27 April 1977 (aged 22)	12	(England) Worcester Warriors
Sione Tuʻipulotu	Scrum-half	28 November 1976 (aged 22)	5	(Tonga) Toloa
Elisi Vunipola	Fly-half	5 June 1972 (aged 27)	24	(Japan) Sanyo
Brian Woolley	Fly-half	18 June 1974 (aged 25)	8	(New Zealand) Wellington
Semisi Fakaʻosifolau	Centre	30 April 1976 (aged 23)	12	(Tonga) Toa-ko-Maʻafu
Salesi Finau (c)	Centre	5 May 1973 (aged 26)	6	(Wales) Llanelli
Epi Taione	Centre	2 March 1979 (aged 20)	0	(Tonga) Fasi Maʻufanga
Etuate Manu	Centre	9 September 1969 (aged 30)	6	(New Zealand) North Harbour
Josh Taumalolo	Centre	8 July 1976 (aged 23)	14	(Wales) Ebbw Vale
Dave Tiueti	Centre	6 June 1973 (aged 26)	10	(Wales) Neath
Taunaholo Taufahema	Wing	23 December 1969 (aged 29)	5	(Japan) World Fighting Bull
Semi Taupeaafe	Wing	29 July 1972 (aged 27)	8	(Japan) Sanyo
Fepikou Tatafu	Wing	2 March 1975 (aged 24)	16	(Tonga) Fasi Maʻufanga
Isi Tapueluelu	Fullback	29 September 1970 (aged 29)	10	Tonga Police
Sateki Tuipulotu	Fullback	3 July 1971 (aged 28)	13	(England) Leeds

== Pool C ==
=== Fiji ===
Head coach: (New Zealand) Brad Johnstone

Player	Position	Date of birth (age)	Caps	Franchise/province
Greg Smith (c)	Hooker	14 July 1974 (aged 25)	19	(New Zealand) Waikato
Isaia Rasila	Hooker	29 April 1969 (aged 30)	9	(Fiji) Nadroga
Daniel Rouse	Prop	1 May 1972 (aged 27)	24	(Fiji) Nadi
Epeli Naituivau	Prop	22 May 1962 (aged 37)	20	(Fiji) Suva
Joeli Veitayaki	Prop	12 January 1967 (aged 32)	30	(New Zealand) North Harbour
Niko Qoro	Prop	9 September 1969 (aged 30)	10	(Fiji) Lautoka
Emori Katalau	Lock	9 April 1967 (aged 32)	27	(Wales) Dunvant
Simon Raiwalui	Lock	8 September 1974 (aged 25)	18	(Wales) Newport
Apenisa Naevo	Lock	24 February 1973 (aged 26)	18	(New Zealand) Counties Manukau
Ifereimi Tawake	Lock	21 September 1962 (aged 37)	44	(Fiji) Nadroga
Setareki Tawake	Flanker	1 March 1969 (aged 30)	44	(Australia) Brisbane Easts
Ilivasi Tabua	Flanker	30 September 1964 (aged 35)	14	(Japan) World Fighting Bull
Alfie Mocelutu	Flanker	29 July 1971 (aged 28)	20	(Japan) Honda Heat
Koli Sewabu	Flanker	15 January 1975 (aged 24)	8	(Fiji) Naitasiri
Alifereti Doviverata	Number 8	14 June 1976 (aged 23)	1	(Fiji) Suva
Inoke Male	Number 8	2 June 1965 (aged 34)	2	(Fiji) Suva
Jacob Rauluni	Scrum-half	25 June 1972 (aged 27)	19	(Australia) Queensland Reds
Mosese Rauluni	Scrum-half	27 June 1975 (aged 24)	7	(Australia) Brisbane
Nicky Little	Fly-half	13 September 1976 (aged 23)	21	(New Zealand) North Harbour
Waisale Serevi	Fly-half	20 May 1968 (aged 31)	25	(France) Stade Montois
Lawrence Little	Centre	24 October 1967 (aged 31)	16	(New Zealand) North Harbour
Tabai Matson	Centre	14 May 1973 (aged 26)	2	(France) CA Brive
Meli Nakauta	Centre	13 October 1971 (aged 27)	6	(Australia) Manly RUFC
Viliame Satala	Centre	19 July 1972 (aged 27)	8	(Fiji) Lautoka
Waisake Sotutu	Centre	11 November 1970 (aged 28)	8	(Japan) Yamaha Júbilo
Fero Lasagavibau	Wing	27 May 1976 (aged 23)	15	(Fiji) Nadroga
Marika Vunibaka	Wing	3 October 1970 (aged 28)	5	(Fiji) Lomaiviti
Manasa Bari	Wing	20 May 1974 (aged 25)	17	(Fiji) Tavua
Imanueli Tiko	Wing	30 September 1974 (aged 25)	7	(Fiji) Lautoka
Alfred Uluinayau	Fullback	20 February 1970 (aged 29)	17	(Japan) Suntory Sungoliath

=== Namibia ===
Head coach: (South Africa) Rudy Joubert

Player	Position	Date of birth (age)	Caps	Franchise/province
Hugo Horn	Hooker	9 May 1977 (aged 22)	6	(Namibia) Wanderers
Frans Fisch	Prop	10 April 1970 (aged 29)	1	(Namibia) Oranjemund
Gerhard Opperman	Prop	2 July 1968 (aged 31)	2	(Namibia) Reho Falcons
Mario Jacobs	Prop	9 July 1972 (aged 27)	2	(England) Harlequins
Eben Smith	Prop	30 January 1971 (aged 28)	4	(Namibia) Wanderers
Andries Blaauw	Prop	25 March 1970 (aged 29)	11	(Namibia) United
Heino Senekal	Lock	20 October 1975 (aged 23)	4	(Namibia) Wanderers
Eben Isaacs	Lock	16 July 1970 (aged 29)	4	(Namibia) Reho Falcons
Pieter Steyn	Lock	28 November 1973 (aged 25)	10	(Namibia) Transnamib
Duimpie Theron	Lock	7 May 1979 (aged 20)	3	(Namibia) United
Sybrand de Beer	Flanker	2 May 1975 (aged 24)	8	(Namibia) United
Herman Lintvelt	Flanker	6 September 1976 (aged 23)	1	(Namibia) United
Mathys van Rooyen	Flanker	25 December 1971 (aged 27)	7	(Namibia) Mariental
Jaco Olivier	Flanker	5 February 1975 (aged 24)	1	(England) Harlequins
Schalk van der Merwe	Flanker	30 August 1974 (aged 25)	6	(England) Harlequins
Quinn Hough (c)	Number 8	29 September 1972 (aged 27)	10	(Namibia) Wanderers
Sean Furter	Number 8	9 January 1977 (aged 22)	1	(Namibia) United
Ronaldo Pedro	Scrum-half	22 August 1972 (aged 27)	1	(Namibia) Reho Falcons
Riaan Jantjies	Scrum-half	23 June 1965 (aged 34)	11	(England) Harlequins
Johan Zaayman	Fly-half	24 September 1973 (aged 26)	9	(Namibia) Wanderers
Rudie van Vuuren	Fly-half	20 September 1972 (aged 27)	6	(Namibia) Wanderers
Sarel van Rensburg	Centre	4 March 1977 (aged 22)	5	(Namibia) United
Lukas Holtzhausen	Centre	7 November 1973 (aged 25)	8	(England) Redruth
Cliff Loubser	Centre	15 May 1973 (aged 26)	0	(Namibia) Reho Falcons
Francois van Rensburg	Centre	23 February 1974 (aged 25)	7	(England) Harlequins
Deon Mouton	Wing	20 November 1974 (aged 24)	1	(Namibia) Kudus
Derek Farmer	Wing	17 June 1974 (aged 25)	8	(Namibia) Reho Falcons
Arthur Samuelson	Wing	6 February 1974 (aged 25)	13	(Namibia) Wanderers
Lean van Dyk	Fullback	5 June 1976 (aged 23)	5	(Namibia) Wanderers
Glovin van Wyk	Fullback	26 November 1973 (aged 25)	1	(Namibia) Unam

=== France ===
Head coach: (France) Jean-Claude Skrela

Note: Flags indicate national union for the club/province as defined by World Rugby.

Player	Position	Date of birth (age)	Caps	Club/province
Marc Dal Maso	Hooker	14 February 1967 (aged 32)	24	(France) US Colomiers
Raphaël Ibañez (c)	Hooker	17 February 1973 (aged 26)	24	(France) USA Perpignan
Christian Califano	Prop	16 May 1972 (aged 27)	47	(France) Stade Toulousain
Pieter de Villiers	Prop	3 July 1972 (aged 27)	1	(France) Stade Français
Cédric Soulette	Prop	30 May 1972 (aged 27)	8	(France) Stade Toulousain
Franck Tournaire	Prop	4 December 1972 (aged 26)	37	(France) Stade Toulousain
David Auradou	Lock	13 November 1973 (aged 25)	6	(France) Stade Français
Abdelatif Benazzi	Lock	20 August 1968 (aged 31)	64	(France) SU Agen
Olivier Brouzet	Lock	22 November 1972 (aged 26)	33	(France) CA Bordeaux-Bègles
Fabien Pelous	Lock	7 December 1973 (aged 25)	43	(France) Stade Toulousain
Arnaud Costes	Flanker	16 June 1973 (aged 26)	7	(France) AS Montferrand
Marc Lièvremont	Flanker	28 October 1968 (aged 30)	19	(France) Stade Français
Olivier Magne	Flanker	11 April 1973 (aged 26)	23	(France) AS Montferrand
Lionel Mallier	Flanker	6 March 1974 (aged 25)	2	(France) CA Brive
Christophe Juillet	Number 8	20 March 1969 (aged 30)	6	(France) Stade Français
Thomas Lièvremont	Number 8	6 November 1973 (aged 25)	14	(France) USA Perpignan
Stéphane Castaignède	Scrum-half	30 September 1969 (aged 30)	1	(France) Stade Montois
Fabien Galthié^{1}	Scrum-half	20 March 1969 (aged 30)	27	(France) US Colomiers
Thomas Castaignède	Fly-half	21 January 1975 (aged 24)	30	(France) Castres Olympique
Christophe Lamaison	Fly-half	8 April 1971 (aged 28)	23	(France) CA Brive
Cédric Desbrosse	Centre	9 November 1971 (aged 27)	0	(France) Stade Toulousain
Richard Dourthe	Centre	13 December 1974 (aged 24)	16	(France) US Dax
Stéphane Glas	Centre	12 November 1973 (aged 25)	27	(France) CS Bourgoin-Jallieu
Philippe Bernat-Salles	Wing	17 February 1970 (aged 29)	27	(France) Biarritz Olympique
Christophe Dominici	Wing	20 May 1972 (aged 27)	9	(France) Stade Français
Jimmy Marlu	Wing	25 May 1977 (aged 22)	1	(France) AS Montferrand
Émile Ntamack	Wing	25 June 1970 (aged 29)	35	(France) Stade Toulousain
Ugo Mola	Fullback	13 May 1974 (aged 25)	6	(France) Castres Olympique
Olivier Sarramea	Fullback	20 October 1975 (aged 23)	4	(France) Castres Olympique

^{1} Fabien Galthié was called up to the squad to replace Pierre Mignoni, who suffered an injury mid-tournament.

=== Canada ===
Head coach: (Republic of Ireland) / (Canada) Patrick Parfrey

Note: Flags indicate national union for the club/province as defined by World Rugby.

Player	Position	Date of birth (age)	Caps	Club/province
Mark Cardinal	Hooker	5 May 1961 (aged 38)	33	(Canada) James Bay Athletic Association
Pat Dunkley	Hooker	18 September 1972 (aged 27)	13	(Canada) James Bay Athletic Association
Richard Bice	Prop	1 March 1968 (aged 31)	21	(Canada) Vancouver Rowing Club
Duane Major	Prop	15 February 1972 (aged 27)	1	(New Zealand) Burnside
David Penney	Prop	4 June 1970 (aged 29)	7	(England) Henley Hawks
Rod Snow	Prop	1 May 1970 (aged 29)	26	(Wales) Newport RFC
Jon Thiel	Prop	31 May 1975 (aged 24)	11	(Canada) James Bay Athletic Association
Al Charron	Lock	27 July 1966 (aged 33)	51	(England) Bristol Rugby
Mike James	Lock	21 July 1973 (aged 26)	31	(France) USA Perpignan
Brian McCarthy	Lock	15 September 1969 (aged 30)	5	(Canada) James Bay Athletic Association
John Tait	Lock	14 August 1973 (aged 26)	18	(Wales) Cardiff Blues
Chris Whittaker	Lock	12 September 1971 (aged 28)	16	(Canada) James Bay Athletic Association
Dan Baugh	Flanker	10 September 1974 (aged 25)	14	(Wales) Cardiff Blues
John Hutchinson	Flanker	24 April 1969 (aged 30)	43	(Japan) Suntory Sungoliath
Rob Robson	Flanker	16 December 1967 (aged 31)	3	(Canada) James Bay Athletic Association
Ryan Banks	Flanker	2 February 1972 (aged 27)	7	(England) Bedford Blues
Mike Schmid	Number 8	28 November 1969 (aged 29)	17	(England) Rotherham Titans
John Graf	Scrum-half	3 December 1968 (aged 30)	52	(Canada) UBC Old Boys Ravens
Morgan Williams	Scrum-half	17 April 1976 (aged 23)	3	(France) Bordeaux Bègles
Bobby Ross	Fly-half	29 August 1969 (aged 30)	36	(Canada) James Bay Athletic Association
Scott Bryan	Centre	10 June 1969 (aged 30)	18	(Canada) Balmy Beach RFC
Kyle Nichols	Centre	3 February 1975 (aged 24)	11	(Wales) Newport RFC
David Lougheed	Centre	11 April 1968 (aged 31)	29	(England) Leicester Tigers
Jeremy Cordle	Wing	24 October 1972 (aged 26)	5	(Canada) Castaway Wanderers RFC
Julian Loveday	Wing	26 March 1963 (aged 36)	10	(England) London Irish
Courtney Smith	Wing	14 April 1971 (aged 28)	20	(Canada) Meraloma Rugby
Joe Pagano	Wing	28 May 1972 (aged 27)	9	(Canada) York Yeomen RFC
Winston Stanley	Wing	14 July 1974 (aged 25)	34	(Canada) James Bay Athletic Association
Gareth Rees (c)	Fullback	30 June 1967 (aged 32)	52	(England) Harlequin F.C.
Scott Stewart	Fullback	16 January 1969 (aged 30)	50	(England) Bedford Blues

== Pool D ==
=== Wales ===
Wales named an initial 30-man squad for the tournament in June 1999. The highlight of the selection was centre Jason Jones-Hughes, who was born in Australia, but was believed to be qualified for Wales through his father. The Australian Rugby Union (ARU) disputed Jones-Hughes' selection because he had already played for the Australian Barbarians, who were considered Australia's de facto second team. This led to a protracted legal battle over Jones-Hughes' eligibility for Wales, in which the International Rugby Board initially ruled in Australia's favour; on appeal, Wales were allowed to select Jones-Hughes, but the ARU refused to release him from his contract with New South Wales. Nevertheless, Jones-Hughes was ultimately allowed to join the Wales team and was named on the bench for the tournament opener against Argentina.

Head coach: (New Zealand) Graham Henry

Note: Flags indicate national union for the club/province as defined by World Rugby.

Player	Position	Date of birth (age)	Caps	Club/province
Garin Jenkins	Hooker	18 August 1966 (aged 33)	46	(Wales) Swansea
Jonathan Humphreys	Hooker	27 February 1969 (aged 30)	32	(Wales) Cardiff
Peter Rogers	Prop	20 January 1969 (aged 30)	8	(Wales) Newport
Andrew Lewis	Prop	13 June 1973 (aged 26)	19	(Wales) Cardiff
Dai Young	Prop	26 July 1967 (aged 32)	35	(Wales) Cardiff
Ben Evans	Prop	31 July 1975 (aged 24)	7	(Wales) Swansea
Chris Wyatt	Lock	10 June 1973 (aged 26)	14	(Wales) Llanelli
Craig Quinnell	Lock	9 July 1975 (aged 24)	17	(Wales) Cardiff
Mike Voyle	Lock	3 January 1970 (aged 29)	19	(Wales) Cardiff
Andy Moore	Lock	25 January 1974 (aged 25)	8	(Wales) Swansea
Gareth Llewellyn	Lock	27 February 1969 (aged 30)	63	(England) Harlequins
Colin Charvis	Flanker	27 December 1972 (aged 26)	23	(Wales) Swansea
Geraint Lewis	Flanker	12 January 1974 (aged 25)	4	(Wales) Pontypridd
Brett Sinkinson	Flanker	30 December 1971 (aged 27)	7	(Wales) Neath
Martyn Williams	Flanker	1 September 1975 (aged 24)	11	(Wales) Pontypridd
Scott Quinnell	Number 8	20 August 1972 (aged 27)	30	(Wales) Llanelli
Rob Howley (c)	Scrum-half	13 October 1970 (aged 28)	36	(Wales) Cardiff
David Llewellyn	Scrum-half	29 September 1970 (aged 29)	3	(Wales) Newport
Neil Jenkins	Fly-half	8 July 1971 (aged 28)	69	(Wales) Cardiff
Stephen Jones	Fly-half	8 December 1977 (aged 21)	2	(Wales) Llanelli
Allan Bateman	Centre	6 March 1965 (aged 34)	20	(England) Northampton
Scott Gibbs	Centre	23 January 1971 (aged 28)	41	(Wales) Swansea
Mark Taylor	Centre	27 February 1973 (aged 26)	16	(Wales) Swansea
Leigh Davies	Centre	20 February 1976 (aged 23)	19	(Wales) Cardiff
Jason Jones-Hughes	Centre	13 September 1976 (aged 23)	0	(Australia) Waratahs
Dafydd James	Wing	25 July 1975 (aged 24)	20	(Wales) Pontypridd
Gareth Thomas	Wing	25 July 1974 (aged 25)	36	(Wales) Cardiff
Nick Walne	Wing	18 September 1975 (aged 24)	3	(Wales) Pontypridd
Neil Boobyer	Fullback	11 June 1972 (aged 27)	7	(Wales) Llanelli
Shane Howarth	Fullback	8 July 1968 (aged 31)	12	(Wales) Newport

=== Argentina ===
Head coaches: (New Zealand) Alex Wyllie and (Argentina) Héctor Mendéz

Note: Flags indicate national union for the club/province as defined by World Rugby.

Player	Position	Date of birth (age)	Caps	Club/province
Agustín Canalda	Hooker	18 April 1977 (aged 22)	2	(Argentina) Club Newman
Mario Ledesma	Hooker	17 May 1973 (aged 26)	19	(Argentina) Curupaytí
Fernando Díaz Alberdi	Prop	2 July 1972 (aged 27)	3	(Argentina) CUBA
Roberto Diego Grau	Prop	16 July 1970 (aged 29)	26	(England) Saracens F.C.
Omar Hasan	Prop	21 April 1971 (aged 28)	24	(Argentina) Natación
Mauricio Reggiardo	Prop	22 February 1970 (aged 29)	24	(France) Castres Olympique
Martín Scelzo	Prop	5 February 1976 (aged 23)	13	(Argentina) Hindú Club
Alejandro Allub	Lock	1 December 1976 (aged 22)	18	(Argentina) Jockey Club Córdoba
Ignacio Fernández Lobbe	Lock	20 November 1974 (aged 24)	16	(Argentina) Liceo Naval
Miguel Ruiz	Lock	10 January 1975 (aged 24)	18	(Argentina) Teque Rugby Club
Pedro Sporleder	Lock	2 January 1971 (aged 28)	64	(Argentina) Curupaytí
Rolando Martín	Flanker	23 September 1968 (aged 31)	49	(Argentina) San Isidro Club
Lucas Ostiglia	Flanker	3 May 1976 (aged 23)	4	(Argentina) Hindú Club
Santiago Phelan	Flanker	31 March 1974 (aged 25)	12	(Argentina) CASI
Raúl Pérez	Flanker	2 July 1965 (aged 34)	21	(Argentina) Duendes Rugby Club
Gonzalo Longo	Number 8	14 March 1974 (aged 25)	4	(Argentina) San Isidro Club
Nicolás Fernández Miranda	Scrum-half	25 November 1972 (aged 26)	22	(Argentina) Hindú Club
Agustín Pichot	Scrum-half	22 August 1974 (aged 25)	21	(England) Bristol
José Cilley	Fly-half	28 December 1972 (aged 26)	12	(Argentina) San Isidro Club
Gonzalo Quesada	Fly-half	2 May 1974 (aged 25)	17	(Argentina) Hindú Club
Lisandro Arbizu (c)	Centre	29 September 1971 (aged 28)	62	(France) CA Brive
Felipe Contepomi	Centre	20 August 1977 (aged 22)	7	(Argentina) Club Newman
Juan Fernández Miranda	Centre	11 November 1974 (aged 24)	5	(Argentina) Hindú Club
José Orengo	Centre	26 April 1976 (aged 23)	12	(Argentina) CA Rosario
Eduardo Simone	Centre	16 October 1974 (aged 24)	24	(England) Bristol
Diego Albanese	Wing	17 September 1973 (aged 26)	27	(Argentina) San Isidro Club
Octavio Bartolucci	Wing	8 March 1975 (aged 24)	9	(Argentina) CA Rosario
Gonzalo Camardón	Wing	19 December 1970 (aged 28)	24	(Argentina) Asociación Alumni
Manuel Contepomi	Fullback	20 August 1977 (aged 22)	7	(Argentina) Club Newman
Ignacio Corleto	Fullback	21 June 1978 (aged 21)	4	(Argentina) CUBA

=== Samoa ===
Head coach: (New Zealand) Bryan Williams

- On 30 June 1999, Fosi Pala'amo was replaced by Robbie Ale due to knee medial ligament injury before the World Cup.

Note: Flags indicate national union for the club/province as defined by World Rugby.

Player	Position	Date of birth (age)	Caps	Club/province
Trevor Leota	Hooker	8 February 1975 (aged 24)	10	(England) London Wasps
Onehunga Matauiau	Hooker	9 November 1975 (aged 23)	2	(New Zealand) Waitemata
Kepi Faiva'ai	Prop	19 April 1970 (aged 29)	29	(New Zealand) Wellington
Robbie Ale	Prop	4 September 1973 (aged 26)	2	(New Zealand) Taranaki
Polo Asi	Prop	30 September 1974 (aged 25)	0	(New Zealand) Bay of Plenty
Brendan Reidy	Prop	13 September 1968 (aged 31)	14	(England) Saracens F.C.
Michael Mika	Prop	24 July 1968 (aged 31)	10	(England) Coventry RFC
Lio Falaniko	Lock	17 September 1970 (aged 29)	18	(New Zealand) Hurricanes
Lama Tone	Lock	24 January 1971 (aged 28)	9	(New Zealand) Counties Manukau
Opeta Palepoi	Lock	2 December 1975 (aged 23)	7	(New Zealand) Wellington
Junior Paramore	Flanker	18 November 1968 (aged 30)	16	(England) Gloucester Rugby
Sene Ta'ala	Flanker	20 October 1973 (aged 25)	19	(New Zealand) Wellington
Kalolo Toleafoa	Flanker	26 May 1971 (aged 28)	2	(Samoa) Marist St. Joseph
Craig Glendinning	Flanker	12 January 1973 (aged 26)	7	(New Zealand) Northland
Semo Sititi	Number 8	6 March 1974 (aged 25)	2	(Samoa) Marist St. Joseph
Isaac Fe'aunati	Number 8	23 July 1973 (aged 26)	4	(England) London Irish
Pat Lam	Number 8	29 September 1968 (aged 31)	31	(England) Northampton Saints
Steven So'oialo	Scrum-half	11 May 1977 (aged 22)	7	(England) Orrell R.U.F.C.
John Clarke	Scrum-half	31 May 1975 (aged 24)	6	(New Zealand) Wellington
Fa'atonu Fili	Fly-half	31 August 1981 (aged 18)	0	(New Zealand) Wellington
Stephen Bachop	Fly-half	2 April 1966 (aged 33)	33	(England) London Irish
Tanner Vili	Fly-half	13 May 1976 (aged 23)	3	(New Zealand) Counties Manukau
George Leaupepe	Centre	2 April 1975 (aged 24)	23	(New Zealand) Counties Manukau
Va'aiga Tuigamala	Centre	4 September 1969 (aged 30)	10	(England) Newcastle Falcons
To'o Vaega	Centre	17 August 1965 (aged 34)	44	(New Zealand) Highlanders
Terry Fanolua	Centre	3 July 1974 (aged 25)	6	(England) Gloucester Rugby
Silao Leaega	Wing	24 July 1973 (aged 26)	3	(New Zealand) North Harbour
Brian Lima	Wing	25 January 1972 (aged 27)	34	(New Zealand) Blues
Afato So'oalo	Wing	5 January 1974 (aged 25)	9	(New Zealand) Crusaders
Filipo Toala	Wing	18 August 1976 (aged 23)	3	(New Zealand) Taranaki
Mike Umaga	Fullback	19 February 1966 (aged 33)	13	(England) Rotherham R.U.F.C.
Earl Va'a	Fullback	1 May 1972 (aged 27)	6	(Italy) L'Aquila Rugby

=== Japan ===
Head coach: (Japan) Seiji Hirao

Note: Flags indicate national union for the club/province as defined by World Rugby.

Player	Position	Date of birth (age)	Caps	Club/province
Toshikazu Nakamichi	Hooker	16 July 1971 (aged 28)	11	(Japan) Kobe Steel
Masahiro Kunda	Hooker	29 September 1966 (aged 33)	45	(Japan) Toshiba
Kohei Oguchi	Prop	6 October 1968 (aged 30)	4	(Japan) Ricoh
Shin Hasegawa	Prop	31 March 1972 (aged 27)	17	(Japan) Suntory
Masaaki Sakata	Prop	25 November 1972 (aged 26)	12	(Japan) Suntory
Naoto Nakamura	Prop	18 January 1969 (aged 30)	17	(Japan) Suntory
Naoya Okubo	Lock	27 September 1975 (aged 24)	5	(Japan) Suntory
Yoshihiko Sakuraba	Lock	22 September 1966 (aged 33)	41	(Japan) Nippon Steel Kamaishi
Hiroyuki Tanuma	Lock	24 May 1973 (aged 26)	22	(Japan) Ricoh
Yasunori Watanabe	Lock	2 July 1974 (aged 25)	14	(Japan) Toshiba
Greg Smith	Flanker	16 July 1968 (aged 31)	14	(Japan) Toyota Motors
Ryuji Ishii	Flanker	13 March 1970 (aged 29)	1	(Japan) Toyota Motors
Jamie Joseph	Flanker	21 November 1969 (aged 29)	6	(Japan) Sanix
Takeomi Ito	Flanker	11 April 1971 (aged 28)	28	(Japan) Kobe Steel
Hajime Kiso	Number 8	7 November 1978 (aged 20)	0	(Japan) Ritsumeikan University
Rob Gordon	Number 8	7 August 1965 (aged 34)	14	(Japan) Toshiba
Graeme Bachop	Scrum-half	11 June 1967 (aged 32)	5	(Japan) Sanix
Wataru Murata	Scrum-half	25 January 1968 (aged 31)	23	(France) Aviron Bayonnais
Keiji Hirose	Fly-half	16 April 1973 (aged 26)	23	(Japan) Toyota Motors
Kensuke Iwabuchi	Fly-half	30 December 1975 (aged 23)	12	(Japan) Kobe Steel
Patiliai Tuidraki	Wing	29 June 1969 (aged 30)	12	(Japan) Toyota Motors
Tsutomu Matsuda	Wing	30 April 1970 (aged 29)	31	(Japan) Toshiba
Daisuke Ohata	Wing	11 November 1975 (aged 23)	15	(Japan) Kobe Steel
Terunori Masuho	Wing	29 January 1972 (aged 27)	36	(Japan) Kobe Steel
Andrew McCormick (c)	Centre	5 February 1967 (aged 32)	22	(Japan) Toyota Motors
Ryohei Miki	Centre	24 March 1978 (aged 21)	1	(Japan) Ryukoku University
Yukio Motoki	Centre	27 August 1971 (aged 28)	44	(Japan) Kobe Steel
Akira Yoshida	Centre	13 August 1971 (aged 28)	9	(Japan) Kobe Steel
Atsushi Koga	Centre	25 February 1975 (aged 24)	0	(Japan) Sanyo Electric
Takafumi Hirao	Fullback	3 March 1975 (aged 24)	4	(Japan) Kobe Steel

== Pool E ==
=== Ireland ===
Head coach: (New Zealand) Warren Gatland

Gordon D'Arcy replaced the injured Girvan Dempsey on 11 September 1999.

Note: Flags indicate national union for the club/province as defined by World Rugby.

Player	Position	Date of birth (age)	Caps	Club/province
Keith Wood	Hooker	27 January 1972 (aged 27)	27	(Ireland) Munster
Ross Nesdale	Hooker	30 July 1968 (aged 31)	11	(England) Newcastle Falcons
Paul Wallace	Prop	30 December 1971 (aged 27)	30	(England) Saracens
Peter Clohessy	Prop	22 March 1966 (aged 33)	31	(Ireland) Munster
Reggie Corrigan	Prop	19 November 1970 (aged 28)	10	(Ireland) Leinster
Justin Fitzpatrick	Prop	21 November 1973 (aged 25)	10	(Ireland) Ulster
Angus McKeen	Prop	13 February 1969 (aged 30)	0	(Ireland) Leinster
Paddy Johns	Lock	19 February 1968 (aged 31)	54	(Ireland) Ulster
Jeremy Davidson	Lock	28 April 1974 (aged 25)	26	(France) Castres Olympique
Malcolm O'Kelly	Lock	19 July 1974 (aged 25)	15	(England) London Irish
Bob Casey	Lock	18 July 1978 (aged 21)	0	(Ireland) Leinster
Eric Miller	Flanker	23 September 1975 (aged 24)	16	(Ireland) Ulster
David Corkery	Flanker	6 November 1972 (aged 26)	27	(Ireland) Munster
Trevor Brennan	Flanker	22 September 1973 (aged 26)	7	(Ireland) Leinster
Andy Ward	Flanker	8 September 1970 (aged 29)	15	(Ireland) Ulster
Kieron Dawson	Flanker	29 January 1975 (aged 24)	3	(England) London Irish
Dion O'Cuinneagain (c)	Number 8	24 May 1972 (aged 27)	13	(Ireland) Ulster
Brian O'Meara	Scrum-half	5 April 1976 (aged 23)	4	(Ireland) Leinster
Tom Tierney	Scrum-half	1 September 1976 (aged 23)	3	(Ireland) Munster
Eric Elwood	Fly-half	25 February 1969 (aged 30)	32	(Ireland) Connacht
David Humphreys	Fly-half	10 September 1971 (aged 28)	18	(Ireland) Ulster
Gordon D'Arcy	Centre	10 February 1980 (aged 19)	0	(Ireland) Leinster
Brian O'Driscoll	Centre	21 January 1979 (aged 20)	3	(Ireland) Leinster
Kevin Maggs	Centre	3 June 1974 (aged 25)	20	(England) Bath
Jonny Bell	Centre	7 February 1974 (aged 25)	29	(Ireland) Ulster
Mike Mullins	Centre	29 October 1970 (aged 28)	1	(Ireland) Munster
Justin Bishop	Wing	8 November 1974 (aged 24)	13	(England) London Irish
James Topping	Wing	18 December 1974 (aged 24)	5	(Ireland) Ulster
Matt Mostyn	Wing	10 September 1974 (aged 25)	2	(Ireland) Connacht
Conor O'Shea	Fullback	21 October 1970 (aged 28)	30	(England) London Irish

=== United States ===
Head coach: (United States) Jack Clark

Note: Flags indicate national union for the club/province as defined by World Rugby.

Player	Position	Date of birth (age)	Caps	Club/province
Tom Billups	Hooker	26 December 1964 (aged 34)	41	(Wales) Pontypridd
Kirk Khasigian	Hooker	24 April 1977 (aged 22)	3	(United States) University of California
Joe Clayton	Prop	24 November 1973 (aged 25)	1	(United States) Old Blues (CA)
Marc L'Huillier	Prop	1 March 1971 (aged 28)	1	(Australia) Sydney University
Ray Lehner	Prop	13 March 1972 (aged 27)	29	(England) Oxford University
George Sucher	Prop	6 March 1969 (aged 30)	12	(United States) Washington
Luke Gross	Lock	21 November 1969 (aged 29)	35	(England) Harlequins
Alec Parker	Lock	10 April 1974 (aged 25)	21	(United States) Gentlemen of Aspen
Dave Hodges	Lock	15 September 1968 (aged 31)	20	(Wales) Llanelli
Shaun Paga	Flanker	16 November 1977 (aged 21)	4	(United States) University of California
Richard Tardits	Flanker	30 July 1965 (aged 34)	0	(United States) Life University
Fifita Mounga	Flanker	5 March 1973 (aged 26)	8	(United States) Old Blues (CA)
Dan Lyle (c)	Number 8	28 September 1970 (aged 29)	24	(England) Bath Rugby
Rob Lumkong	Number 8	3 August 1970 (aged 29)	27	(United States) Denver Barbarians
Kevin Dalzell	Scrum-half	25 January 1974 (aged 25)	12	(United States) OMBAC
Jesse Coulson	Scrum-half	6 January 1977 (aged 22)	0	(New Zealand) Hamilton Old Boys
David Niu	Fly-half	3 January 1966 (aged 33)	5	(United States) Philadelphia Whitemarsh
Dave Stroble	Fly-half	29 April 1976 (aged 23)	0	(France) Maisons-Laffitte
Juan Grobler	Centre	7 July 1973 (aged 26)	15	(United States) Denver Barbarians
Alatini Saulala	Centre	22 September 1968 (aged 31)	17	(United States) San Mateo
Mark Scharrenberg	Centre	30 April 1969 (aged 30)	36	(United States) Golden Gate
Tomasi Takau	Centre	15 October 1969 (aged 29)	22	(United States) Gentlemen of Aspen
Mark Williams	Centre	26 June 1961 (aged 38)	22	(United States) Gentlemen of Aspen
Vaea Anitoni	Wing	20 September 1970 (aged 29)	41	(United States) San Mateo
Andre Blom	Wing	4 June 1970 (aged 29)	10	(United States) Denver Barbarians
Brian Hightower	Wing	15 September 1970 (aged 29)	14	(United States) Gentlemen of Aspen
Rich Schurfeld	Wing	19 April 1963 (aged 36)	5	(United States) Ann Arbor
Sinapati Uiagalelei	Wing	21 March 1979 (aged 20)	0	(United States) Orange County Islanders
Kurt Shuman	Fullback	5 January 1974 (aged 25)	14	(United States) OMBAC

=== Australia ===
Head coach: (Australia) Rod MacQueen

Note: Flags indicate national union for the club/province as defined by World Rugby.

Player	Position	Date of birth (age)	Caps	Club/province
Phil Kearns	Hooker	27 June 1967 (aged 32)	65	(Australia) Waratahs
Jeremy Paul	Hooker	14 March 1977 (aged 22)	10	(Australia) Brumbies
Michael Foley	Hooker	7 June 1967 (aged 32)	25	(Australia) Reds
Andrew Blades	Prop	4 June 1967 (aged 32)	27	(Australia) Waratahs
Richard Harry	Prop	30 November 1967 (aged 31)	25	(Australia) Waratahs
Dan Crowley	Prop	28 August 1965 (aged 34)	34	(Australia) Reds
Rod Moore	Prop	6 January 1972 (aged 27)	0	(Australia) Waratahs
John Eales (c)	Lock	27 June 1970 (aged 29)	64	(Australia) Reds
Owen Finegan	Lock	22 April 1972 (aged 27)	27	(Australia) Brumbies
David Giffin	Lock	6 November 1973 (aged 25)	10	(Australia) Brumbies
Matt Cockbain	Flanker	19 September 1972 (aged 27)	24	(Australia) Reds
Jim Williams	Flanker	8 December 1968 (aged 30)	3	(Australia) Brumbies
David Wilson	Flanker	4 January 1967 (aged 32)	67	(Australia) Reds
Mark Connors	Flanker	17 May 1971 (aged 28)	4	(Australia) Reds
Brett Robinson	Flanker	24 January 1970 (aged 29)	16	(Australia) Brumbies
Toutai Kefu	Number 8	8 April 1974 (aged 25)	21	(Australia) Reds
Tiaan Strauss	Number 8	28 June 1965 (aged 34)	7	(Australia) Waratahs
George Gregan	Scrum-half	19 April 1973 (aged 26)	49	(Australia) Brumbies
Chris Whitaker	Scrum-half	19 October 1974 (aged 24)	4	(Australia) Waratahs
Rod Kafer	Fly-half	25 June 1971 (aged 28)	1	(Australia) Brumbies
Stephen Larkham	Fly-half	29 May 1974 (aged 25)	25	(Australia) Brumbies
Nathan Grey	Centre	31 March 1975 (aged 24)	13	(Australia) Waratahs
Tim Horan	Centre	18 May 1970 (aged 29)	74	(Australia) Reds
Daniel Herbert	Centre	6 February 1974 (aged 25)	33	(Australia) Reds
Jason Little	Centre	26 August 1970 (aged 29)	62	(Australia) Reds
Joe Roff	Wing	20 September 1975 (aged 24)	45	(Australia) Brumbies
Ben Tune	Wing	28 December 1976 (aged 22)	31	(Australia) Reds
Scott Staniforth	Wing	12 December 1977 (aged 21)	0	(Australia) Waratahs
Matt Burke	Fullback	26 March 1973 (aged 26)	38	(Australia) Waratahs
Chris Latham	Fullback	8 September 1975 (aged 24)	5	(Australia) Reds

=== Romania ===
Head coach: (Romania) Mircea Paraschiv

Note: Flags indicate national union for the club/province as defined by World Rugby.

Player	Position	Date of birth (age)	Caps	Club/province
Ștefan Demici	Hooker	4 August 1975 (aged 24)	1	(Romania) CS Dinamo București
Răzvan Mavrodin	Hooker	23 September 1973 (aged 26)	3	(France) USA Perpignan
Petru Bălan	Prop	12 July 1976 (aged 23)	8	(Romania) CS Dinamo București
Nicolae Dragoș Dima	Prop	30 July 1979 (aged 20)	0	(France) Castres Olympique
Laurențiu Rotaru	Prop	17 January 1970 (aged 29)	1	(France) US Montauban
Constantin Stan	Prop	10 January 1969 (aged 30)	23	(Romania) CS Dinamo București
Dragoș Niculae	Prop	17 March 1971 (aged 28)	39	(France) Aurillac
Daniel Chiriac	Lock	8 June 1973 (aged 26)	1	(France) US Annecy
Tudor Constantin (c)	Lock	17 November 1969 (aged 29)	9	(France) Racing Club
Ovidiu Slușariuc	Lock	7 February 1968 (aged 31)	14	(Romania) CS Dinamo București
Cătălin Drăguceanu	Flanker	19 November 1970 (aged 28)	25	(Romania) CSA Steaua București
Alin Petrache	Flanker	29 October 1976 (aged 22)	4	(France) Racing Club
Florin Corodeanu	Flanker	26 March 1977 (aged 22)	8	(Romania) CSA Steaua București
Ovidiu Tonița	Flanker	6 August 1980 (aged 19)	0	(Romania) CS Rulmentul Bârlad
Tiberiu Brînză	Number 8	21 September 1968 (aged 31)	31	(France) RC Narbonne
Erdinci Septar	Number 8	12 February 1973 (aged 26)	9	(Romania) RCJ Farul Constanța
Marius Iacob	Scrum-half	5 December 1972 (aged 26)	6	(Romania) CS Dinamo București
Lucian Sîrbu	Scrum-half	16 October 1976 (aged 22)	1	(Romania) RC Grivița București
Petre Mitu	Scrum-half	22 March 1977 (aged 22)	14	(France) Aurillac
Ionuț Tofan	Fly-half	8 March 1977 (aged 22)	6	(Romania) CSA Steaua București
Lucien Vusec	Fly-half	15 September 1972 (aged 27)	4	(France) RC Strasbourg
Gabriel Brezoianu	Centre	18 January 1977 (aged 22)	10	(Romania) Universitatea Timișoara
Romeo Gontineac	Centre	18 December 1973 (aged 25)	23	(France) Aurillac
Cristian Lupu	Centre	19 June 1975 (aged 24)	4	(Romania) CS Dinamo București
Mihai Ciolacu	Wing	11 September 1977 (aged 22)	4	(Romania) RCJ Farul Constanța
Radu Fugigi	Wing	29 November 1973 (aged 25)	8	(France) Caen
Cristian Hîldan	Wing	22 September 1973 (aged 26)	4	(Romania) CS Dinamo București
Cristian Săuan	Wing	18 March 1974 (aged 25)	1	(Romania) Universitatea Cluj
Gheorghe Solomie	Wing	5 March 1969 (aged 30)	41	(France) Aurillac
Mihai Vioreanu	Fullback	3 October 1974 (aged 24)	9	(Romania) Universitatea Timișoara
