= 1999 Rugby World Cup – European qualification =

Tournament details
- Dates: 5 October 1996 – 5 December 1998
- No. of nations: 30

In the 1999 Rugby World Cup qualifying process, European teams played for six places in the final tournament. Three more places were available in the repechage. France and Wales were automatic qualifiers.

== Round A ==
=== Pool 1 ===
Ukraine qualify for Round B.

Place	Nation	Games				Points			Table points
Place	Nation	Played	Won	Drawn	Lost	For	Against	Diff.	Table points
1	Ukraine	4	4	0	0	177	21	+156	12
2	Yugoslavia	4	2	0	2	18	70	-52	8
3	Switzerland	4	1	1	2	40	50	-10	7
4	Israel	4	1	1	2	46	73	-27	7
5	Austria	4	1	0	3	15	82	-67	6

5 October 1996

Ukraine	60–0	Yugoslavia

Kyiv

26 October 1996

Austria	3–0 withdraw	Yugoslavia

Vienna

2 November 1996

Switzerland	0–30	Ukraine

Nyon

23 November 1996

Israel	15–3	Austria

Tel Aviv

30 November 1996

Israel	9–9	Switzerland

Tel Aviv

1 March 1997

Yugoslavia	8–0	Switzerland

Belgrade

26 April 1997

Austria	6–36	Ukraine

Vienna

10 May 1997

Yugoslavia	10–7	Israel

Pancevo

17 May 1997

Ukraine	51–15	Israel

Odesa

24 May 1997

Switzerland	31–3	Austria

Basel

=== Pool 2 ===
Croatia qualify for Round B.

Place	Nation	Games				Points			Table points
Place	Nation	Played	Won	Drawn	Lost	For	Against	Diff.	Table points
1	Croatia	4	4	0	0	192	67	+125	12
2	Latvia	4	3	0	1	165	52	+113	10
3	Moldova	4	2	0	2	53	81	-28	8
4	Norway	4	1	0	3	42	125	-83	6
5	Bulgaria	4	0	0	4	44	171	-127	4

28 September 1996

Latvia	44–6	Norway

Riga

12 October 1996

Norway	7–43	Croatia

Stavanger

12 October 1996

Bulgaria	6–14	Moldova

Sofia

19 October 1996

Moldova	3–8	Latvia

Chișinău

26 October 1996

Bulgaria	31–46	Croatia

Sofia

3 May 1997

Moldova	31–7	Norway

Chișinău

10 May 1997

Latvia	89–0	Bulgaria

Riga

10 May 1997

Croatia	60–5	Moldova

Split

17 May 1997

Croatia	43–24	Latvia

Makarska

24 May 1997

Norway	22–7	Bulgaria

Oslo

=== Pool 3 ===
Andorra qualify for Round B.

Place	Nation	Games				Points			Table points
Place	Nation	Played	Won	Drawn	Lost	For	Against	Diff.	Table points
1	Andorra	4	4	0	0	139	65	+74	12
2	Sweden	4	3	0	1	191	60	+131	10
3	Hungary	4	2	0	2	50	79	-29	8
4	Lithuania	4	1	0	3	70	157	-87	6
5	Luxembourg	4	0	0	4	27	116	-89	4

5 October 1996

Lithuania	26–3	Luxembourg

Vilnius

19 October 1996

Andorra	54–24	Lithuania

Andorra-la-Vella

19 October 1996

Sweden	39–17	Hungary

Vanersborg

2 November 1996

Luxembourg	3–12	Hungary

Cessange

2 November 1996

Andorra	21–20	Sweden

Andorra-la-Vella

15 March 1997

Luxembourg	16–30	Andorra

Cessange

19 April 1997

Sweden	48–5	Luxembourg

Karlskrona

3 May 1997

Lithuania	17–84	Sweden

Plungė

31 May 1997

Hungary	16–3	Lithuania

Budapest

14 June 1997

Hungary	5–34	Andorra

Budapest

== Round B ==
=== Pool 1 ===
Italy and Georgia qualify for Round C.

Place	Nation	Games				Points			Table points
Place	Nation	Played	Won	Drawn	Lost	For	Against	Diff.	Table points
1	Italy	4	4	0	0	220	62	+158	12
2	Georgia	4	3	0	1	74	60	+14	10
3	Croatia	4	2	0	2	105	90	+15	8
4	Russia	4	1	0	3	85	92	-7	6
5	Denmark	4	0	0	4	26	206	-180	4

12 October 1997

Georgia	29–15	Croatia

Tbilisi

18 October 1997

Denmark	8–19	Georgia

Copenhagen

19 October 1997

Croatia	23–16	Russia

Makarska

1 November 1997

Italy A	102–3	Denmark

Brescia

11 April 1998

Italy A	31–14	Georgia

L'Aquila

18 April 1998

Russia	18–48	Italy

Krasnoiarsk

3 May 1998

Russia	45–9	Denmark

Penza

16 May 1998

Denmark	6–40	Croatia

Aalborg

20 May 1998

Georgia	12–6	Russia

Tbilisi

6 June 1998

Croatia	27–39	Italy A

Makarska

=== Pool 2 ===
Romania and Netherlands qualify for Round C.

Place	Nation	Games				Points			Table points
Place	Nation	Played	Won	Drawn	Lost	For	Against	Diff.	Table points
1	Romania	4	4	0	0	238	51	+187	12
2	Netherlands	4	3	0	1	106	78	+78	10
3	Ukraine	4	2	0	2	97	87	+10	8
4	Poland	4	1	0	3	58	152	-94	6
5	Belgium	4	0	0	4	49	180	-131	4

4 October 1997

Belgium	18–83	Romania

Brussels

18 October 1997

Ukraine	48–5	Belgium

Kyiv

26 October 1997

Netherlands	49–7	Poland

Amsterdam

1 November 1997

Netherlands	35–13	Ukraine

Amsterdam

28 March 1998

Poland	30–10	Belgium

Gdańsk

18 April 1998

Belgium	16–19	Netherlands

Brussels

25 April 1998

Romania	42–3	Netherlands

Bucharest

2 May 1998

Romania	74–13	Poland

Bucharest

16 May 1998

Poland	8–19	Ukraine

Mosir

30 May 1998

Ukraine	17–39	Romania

Kharkiv

=== Pool 3 ===
Spain and Portugal qualify for Round C.

Place	Nation	Games				Points			Table points
Place	Nation	Played	Won	Drawn	Lost	For	Against	Diff.	Table points
1	Spain	4	4	0	0	158	42	+116	12
2	Portugal	4	3	0	1	120	60	+60	10
3	Germany	4	2	0	2	102	82	+20	8
4	Czech Republic	4	1	0	3	80	105	-25	6
5	Andorra	4	0	0	4	45	216	-171	4

13 September 1997

Czech Republic	45–20	Andorra

Prague

4 October 1997

Andorra	11–56	Germany

Andorra-la-Vella

18 October 1997

Germany	31–17	Czech Republic

Hanover

8 November 1997

Andorra	3–62	Spain

Andorra-la-Vella

30 November 1997

Spain	39–8	Czech Republic

Santander

4 April 1998

Portugal	30–6	Germany

Lisbon

18 April 1998

Czech Republic	10–15	Portugal

Prague

26 April 1998

Germany	9–24	Spain

Heidelberg

9 May 1998

Spain	33–22	Portugal

Elche

30 May 1998

Portugal	53–11	Andorra

Lousã

== Round C ==
=== Pool 1 ===
Ireland and Romania qualify for RWC 1999, Georgia goes forward to Repechage.

Place	Nation	Games				Points			Table points
Place	Nation	Played	Won	Drawn	Lost	For	Against	Diff.	Table points
1	Ireland	2	2	0	0	123	35	+88	6
2	Romania	2	1	0	1	62	76	-14	4
3	Georgia	2	0	0	2	23	97	-74	2

14 November 1998	Ireland	70–0	Georgia	Lansdowne Road, Dublin
	Try: Bell, Costello; Dempsey 2, Duignan; Johns, Maggs; O'Shea, Scally; Wallace; Con: Elwood 10			Referee: Robert Davies (Wales)
Ireland: 15. Conor O'Shea, 14. Justin Bishop, 13. Pat Duignan, 12. Jonny Bell, 11. Kevin Maggs, 10. Eric Elwood, 9. Conor McGuinness, 8. Victor Costello, 7. Andy Ward, 6. Eric Miller, 5. Malcolm O'Kelly, 4. Paddy Johns, (cap) 3. Paul Wallace, 2. Ross Nesdale, 1. Peter Clohessy, Replacements: Allen Clarke, Girvan Dempsey, Cieran Scally, Jeremy Davidson, Dion O'Cuinneagain, Justin Fitzpatrick,				Referee: Robert Davies (Wales)
Georgia : 15. Vassil Abashidze, 14. George Buguianishvili, 13. Emzar Dzagnidze, 12. Vassil Katsadze, 11. Archil Kavtarahvili, 10. Besso Tepnadze, 9. Shavleg Janelidze, 8. Kakha Kobakhidze, 7. Grigol Labadze, 6. Archil Kobakhidze, 5. Vano Nadiradze, (cap) 4. Ilia Zedginidze, 3. Goderdzi Shvelidze, 2. Levan Javelidze, 1. Irakli Chikava, Replacements: Zurab Mtchedlishvili, Levan Tsabadze, Paliko Jimsheladze, Bessik Khamashuridze,

18 November 1998	Romania	27–23	Georgia	Lansdowne Road, Dublin
	Try: Brezoianu, Mitu, Solomie; Con: Mitu 3 Pen: Mitu 2		Try: Kavtarahvili, Tsabadze; Con: Urjukashvili 2 Pen: Machitidze, Urjukashvili 2	Referee: Jonathan Kaplan (South Africa)
Romania :15. Mihai Vioreanu, 14. Cristian Hîldan, 13. Gabriel Brezoianu, 12. Romeo Gontineac, 11. Gheorghe Solomie, 10. Roland Vusec, 9. Petre Mitu, 8. Cătălin Drăguceanu (cap.), 7. Florin Corodeanu, 6. Alex Manta, 5. Adrian Gîrbu, 4. Mihăiță Dragomir, 3. Constantin Stan, 2. Răzvan Mavrodin, 1. Dragoș Niculae, Replacements: Florin Mărioara, Petru Bălan, Ovidiu Slușariuc, Vasile Doja, Mihai Ciolacu				Referee: Jonathan Kaplan (South Africa)
Georgia :15. Malkhaz Urjukashvili, 14. Archil Kavtarahvili, 13. Paliko Jimsheladze, 12. Bessik Khamashuridze, 11. George Buguianishvili, 10. Kakha Machitidze, 9. Irakli Guiorkhelidze, 8. Kakha Kobakhidze, 7. Grigol Labadze, 6. Zaza Lezhava, 5. Zurab Mtchedlishvili (cap), 4. Guia Rapava-Ruskini, 3. Levan Tsabadze, 2. Akvsenti Giorgadze, 1. Mevlud Mtiulishvili, Replacements: Besso Tepnadze, Goderdzi Shvelidze, Shavleg Janelidze, Vassil Katsadze, Vano Nadiradze

21 November 1998	Ireland	53–35	Romania	Lansdowne Road, Dublin
	Try: Bell 2, O'Shea; Scally, Ward; Penalty try 2 Con: Elwood 3, Humphreys 3 Pen: Elwood 2		Try: Brezoianu, Fugigi; Solomie, Vioreanu 2 Con: Mitu 2 Pen: Mitu 2	Referee: Paul Honiss (New Zealand)
Ireland 15. Conor O'Shea, 14. Justin Bishop, 13. Pat Duignan, 12. Jonny Bell, 11. Darragh O'Mahony, 10. Eric Elwood, 9. Cieran Scally, 8. Victor Costello, 7. Andy Ward, 6. Eric Miller, 5. Malcolm O'Kelly, 4. Paddy Johns (cap), 3. Paul Wallace, 2. Allen Clarke, 1. Peter Clohessy, Replacements: Kevin Maggs, Jeremy Davidson, Dion O'Cuinneagain, Keith Wood, David Humphreys, Conor McGuinness, Justin Fitzpatrick				Referee: Paul Honiss (New Zealand)
Romania :15. Mihai Vioreanu, 14. Radu Fugigi, 13. Gabriel Brezoianu, 12. Romeo Gontineac, 11. Gheorghe Solomie, 10. Roland Vusec, 9. Petre Mitu, 8. Cătălin Drăguceanu (cap), 7. Adrian Gîrbu, 6. Alex Manta, 5. Vasile Doja, 4. Mihăiță Dragomir, 3. Florin Mărioara, 2. Răzvan Mavrodin, 1. Dragoș Niculae, Replacements: Erdinci Septar, Cristian Lupu, Mihai Ciolacu, Ovidiu Slușariuc, Petru Bălan, Marius Iacob, Sergiu Mocanu

=== Pool 2 ===
England and Italy qualify for RWC 1999, Netherlands goes forward to Repechage.

Place	Nation	Games				Points			Table points
Place	Nation	Played	Won	Drawn	Lost	For	Against	Diff.	Table points
1	England	2	2	0	0	133	15	+118	6
2	Italy	2	1	0	1	82	30	+52	4
3	Netherlands	2	0	0	2	7	177	-170	2

14 November 1998

England	110–0	Netherlands

Alfred McAlpine Stadium, Huddersfield

18 November 1998

Netherlands	7–67	Italy

Alfred McAlpine Stadium, Huddersfield

22 November 1998

England	23–15	Italy

Alfred McAlpine Stadium, Huddersfield

=== Pool 3 ===
Scotland and Spain qualify for RWC 1999, Portugal goes forward to Repechage.

Place	Nation	Games				Points			Table points
Place	Nation	Played	Won	Drawn	Lost	For	Against	Diff.	Table points
1	Scotland	2	2	0	0	170	14	+156	6
2	Spain	2	1	0	1	24	102	-78	4
3	Portugal	2	0	0	2	28	106	-78	2

28 November 1998

Scotland XV	85–11	Portugal

Murrayfield, Edinburgh

2 December 1998

Portugal	17–21	Spain

Murrayfield, Edinburgh

5 December 1998

Scotland XV	85–3	Spain

Murrayfield, Edinburgh

== Bibliography ==
- Volpe, Francesco; Pacitti, Paolo (1999). Rugby 2000 (in Italian). GTE Gruppo Editorale.
- "Rugby World Cup–European qualifiers 1999". The Rugby Archive. 13 December 2018. Archived from the original on 28 February 2022.
