= Etuate =

Etuate is a given name. Notable people with the given name include:

- ʻEtuate Lavulavu (born 1958 or 1959), Tongan politician
- Etuate Manu (born 1969), Tongan rugby union player
- Etuate Mataitini (1887–1967), Fijian chief
- Etuate Qionimacawa (fl. 2016), Fijian rugby league player
- Etuate Tavai (1958–1999), Fijian politician
- Etuate Uaisele (born 1984), Tongan rugby league player
- Etuate Vakatawa (fl. 2000), Fijian rugby league player
