= Ciolacu =

Ciolacu is a Romanian surname. Notable people with the surname include:

- Andrei Ciolacu (born 1992), Romanian footballer
- Ioana Ciolacu (born 1982), Romanian fashion designer
- Marcel Ciolacu (born 1967), Romanian politician
- Mihaela Ciolacu (born 1998), Romanian footballer
- Mihai Ciolacu (born 1977), Romanian rugby union player

== See also ==
- Ciolacu Nou, a commune in Fălești District, Moldova, and its village of Ciolacu Vechi
