= Atsushi Koga =

Atsushi Koga may refer to:

- Atsushi Koga (rugby union)
- Atsushi Koga (politician)
