= Gia Labadze =

Georgia international rugby union player

- Born: 21 September 1973 (age 53) Tbilisi, Georgian SSR, Soviet Union
- Height: 1.94 m (6 ft 4 1/2 in)
- Weight: 95 kg (14 st 13 lb)

Rugby union career
- Position(s): Number 8, Flanker
Senior career
Years	Team	Apps	(Points)
1999-2000	SO Chambéry		
2000-2009	Toulon		
2009-2010	Stade phocéen		
2010-2012	US La Seyne		
- Correct as of 30/10/2012
International career
Years	Team	Apps	(Points)
1996-2012	Georgia	67	(60)
- Correct as of 31/10/2021

Grigol Labadze, better known as Gia Labadze (born 21 September 1973 in Tbilisi) is a retired Georgian rugby union player. He played as a flanker or number 8.

== Domestic career ==
Labadze moved to France from Russia where he was previously playing domestically in 1998 after being spotted playing for Georgia against Ireland and Romania in the 1999 World Cup qualifiers, he joined Fédérale 2 SO Chambéry initially before joining Toulon in 2000 where he spent the majority of his club career and was a regular part of the side for a decade, helping them to two Pro D2 titles in 2005 and 2008 and captaining them between 2006 and 2007. He left Toulon at the end of the 2008/09 season and alongside Czech winger Martin Jágr, he was given a lap of honour at Toulon's last home game of the season at the Stade Mayol.

After leaving Toulon, Labadze spent the rest of his career in Fédérale 1, he joined Stade Phocéen for a single season and spent his last two seasons with La Seyne before retiring from rugby in 2012.

== International career ==
Labadze played for the Soviet Union at age grade level, and made his debut for Georgia in 1996 against Czech Republic. He was a mainstay of the national side from his debut for 15 years, playing in Georgia's first two World Cup campaigns in 2003 and 2007 and captaining the side on six occasions. He hoped to make Georgia's squad for the 2011 World Cup but failed to do so. However he received a surprise recall aged 38 to the side for the 2012 tour to North America before he retired from rugby.

Labadze retired with 67 caps with 12 tries and as the third most capped Georgian player of all time. And at the age of 38 in his final appearance against Canada in 2012, he is the oldest player ever to play for Georgia and tenth oldest international player of all time.
