= Frank Molloy =

Samoan golfer (born 1938)

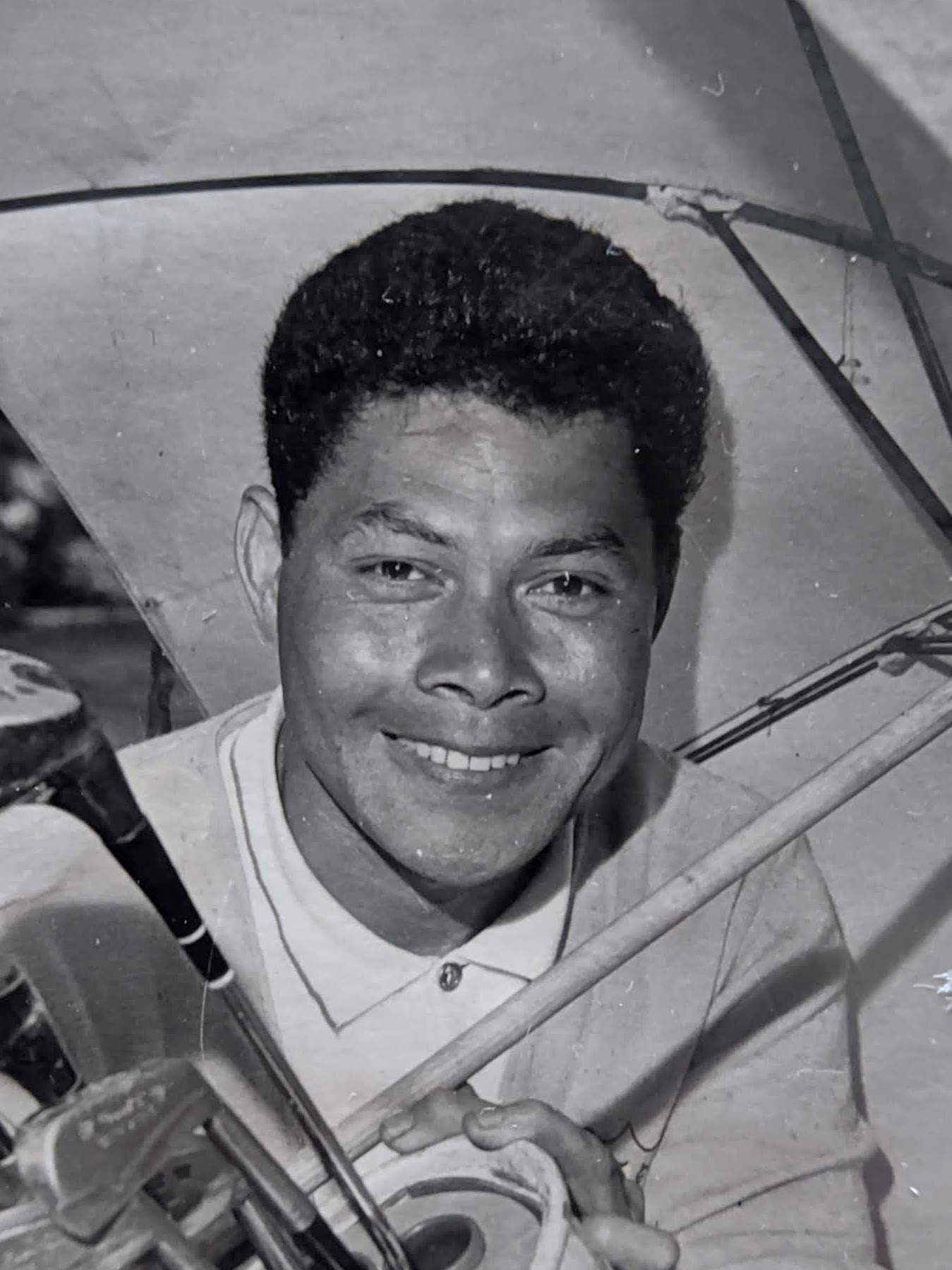

Personal information
- Nickname: Boomer
- Nationality: New Zealand
- Born: March 1, 1938 Moataʻa, Samoa
- Died: 16 October 2026 (aged 88) Auckland, New Zealand

Career
- Sport: Golf
- Turned professional: 1966
- Professional wins: 3

Best results in major championships
- Masters Tournament: DNP
- PGA Championship: DNP
- U.S. Open: DNP
- The Open Championship: CUT: 1972

Frank Molloy (Note: The spelling of his surname varies, it is sometimes spelt Malloy. Molloy is used in this article for consistency.) (1 March 1938 – 16 October 2026) was a Samoan-born New Zealand professional golfer. He won the Fiji Open in 1971 and the Samoan Open in 1972 and 1974. He was notable for being one of the first Polynesian professional golfers. He is believed to have been the first Pacific Islander to compete in The Open Championship. He also played Rugby league for Auckland in 1962.

== Early life ==
Molloy was born in the village of Moataʻa just to the east of Apia, Samoa. He is a member of the Sā Talavou branch of the Sā Malietoa, one of Samoa's four paramount chiefly dynasties. As a child, Frank caddied for his father, an amateur golfer who had a three handicap at the makeshift golf course at the Apia racecourse. Growing up, Molloy spent time around the New Zealand administration. This was due to his family's high societal standing and his father's job in the Samoan Police. The New Zealand administrator recognised Molloy's aptitude for the sport. He challenged him to a game, offering his set of clubs as a prize if Molloy were to win the game. Molloy won and the administrator kept his word and gave him his first set of clubs. Around 1955, Molloy's father died of elephantiasis. Following his father's death, he and his family emigrated to Auckland, New Zealand in 1956.

== Golf career ==
In 1957, Molloy joined the Akarana Golf Club and was selected for the club's top team within a year. He was later chosen to represent Auckland at the Freyburg Rosebowl and Gerrad Shield Golf competitions over a period of four years and he was ranked number one in the team for two of those years. In 1965, Molloy lost his finger in a work accident. He was told by doctors he would not be able to play for six months, however, he was back playing again after just one. He was able to quickly adapt to the loss of his finger, and in 1966 was granted entry to the NZPGA. In 1968, Molloy was appointed club professional at Maungakiekie Golf Club, a club with which he has a long standing association. In 1971, Molloy won the second Fiji Open. He competed again a number of times, placing highly but never winning again. In 1972 and 1974 he won the Samoan Open.

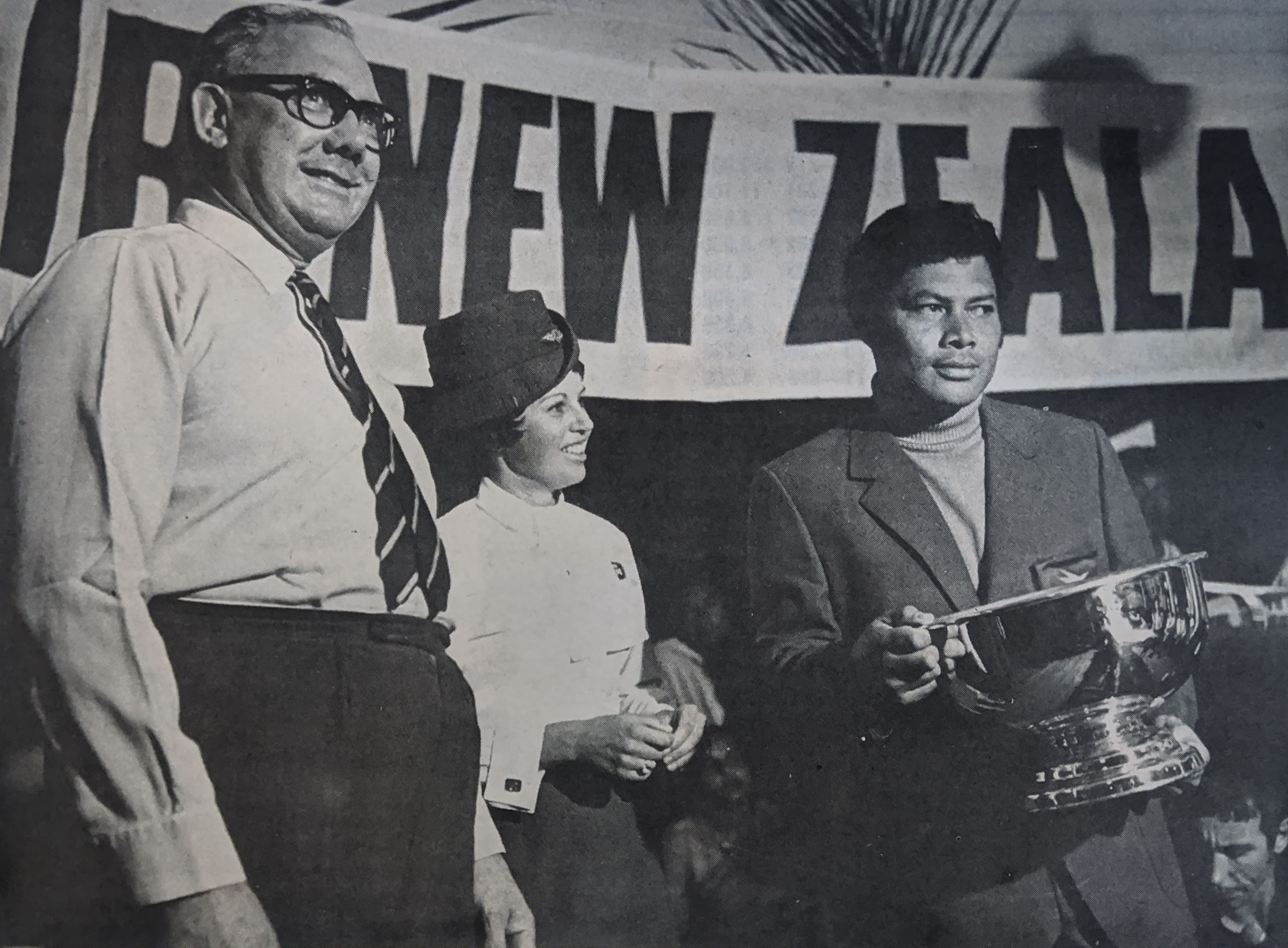
Frank Molloy being presented with the Fiji Open Cup by Fiji Governor Sir Robert Foster

=== 1972 Open Championship ===
While they were on tour in New Zealand, Molloy tutored and played with Roy Phillips, lead vocalist of the British pop group The Peddlers. Philips and the group liked Molloy so much that they decided to sponsor him to attend 1972 Open Championship. They paid for his airfares, picked him up from the airport and even lent him one of their Rolls Royces to drive. At the Open, Molloy initially performed well, easily passing the pre-qualifying rounds. During the second round he seriously injured his hand striking a rock while attempting to hit his ball out from the rough. The injury hampered his performance but despite this he missed the 36-hole cut by only three strokes.

== Death ==
Molloy died at the age of 88 in Auckland, New Zealand, due to complications arising from an influenza infection. He had been suffering from dementia for a number of years prior to his death.
