= María Ribera =

Spanish rugby sevens player (born 1986)

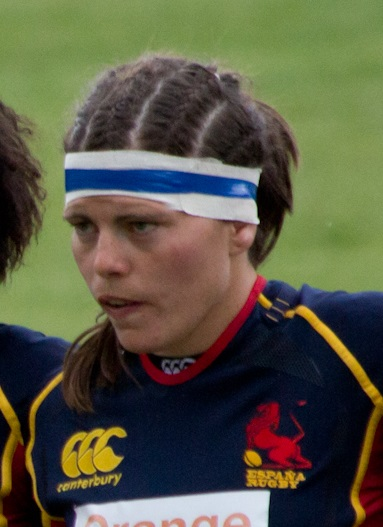
- Ribera in 2013
- Born: 8 July 1986 (age 40) Badajoz, Spain
- Height: 172 cm (5 ft 8 in)
- Weight: 76 kg (168 lb; 12 st 0 lb)

Rugby union career
- Position: Lock
Senior career
Years	Team	Apps	(Points)
?–2015	Club Esportiu INEF Barcelona		
2013	Richmond F.C.		
2015–2019	Sanse Scrum		
2019–2020	Club Esportiu INEF Barcelona		
2020–2022	Rugby Turia		
International career
Years	Team	Apps	(Points)
?–2017	Spain	30	(0)
National sevens team
Years	Team		Comps
2013–2018	Spain 7s		176
Coaching career
- Years: Team
- 2024–: Spain 7s (women)

María Ribera (born 8 July 1986) is a Spanish rugby sevens coach and former player. She is currently the coach of Spain's women's national sevens team.

== Career ==
Ribera competed for the Spanish women's national rugby sevens team and was included in their squad to the 2016 Summer Olympics. She was also part of the team that won the final Olympic qualification tournament in Dublin, Ireland.

Ribera also played at the 2013 Rugby World Cup Sevens in Russia.

=== Coach ===
On 30 August 2024, she was appointed coach of the Spain Women's 7s, replacing Alberto Socías.
