= Mosir =

Mosir may refer to:

- MOSiR, or Municipal Sports and Recreation Center, public sports bodies in Poland
- MOSiR Stadium, several stadiums with the name

== See also ==
- Aynu mosir, modern Ainu name for the island of Hokkaido, Japan
- Ainu Mosir, a 2020 Japanese film
