= Polo Asi =

Samoan rugby union player

- Born: Samuela Polo Asi; 30 September 1974 (age 52) Moata'a, Samoa
- Height: 5 ft 10 in (1.78 m)
- Weight: 252 lb (114 kg)
- School: St Joseph's College, Samoa.

Rugby union career
- Position: Prop
Provincial / State sides
Years	Team	Apps	(Points)
1999	Bay of Plenty	4	(0)
2001	Counties Manukau	8	(0)
International career
Years	Team	Apps	(Points)
1999-2001	Samoa	15	(0)

Samuela Polo Asi (born 7 June 1977) is a Samoan rugby union player. He plays as a prop.

== Career ==
He first played for Samoa as tighthead prop during the quarter-final match of the 1999 Rugby World Cup against Scotland, at Murrayfield . His last match for Samoa was against Fiji, at Tokyo, on 8 July 2001.
