= Robbie Ale =

Samoan rugby union player

- Born: Robert Anthony Ale; 4 September 1973 (age 53) Samoa
- Height: 5 ft 11 in (1.80 m)
- Weight: 252 lb (114 kg)

Rugby union career
- Position: Prop
Amateur team(s)
Years	Team	Apps	(Points)
1995	Alhambra Union		
1997	Inglewood		
1998-1999	Jonhsonville		
2000-2001	Kaierau		
Provincial / State sides
Years	Team	Apps	(Points)
1995	South Canterbury	1	(0)
1997	Taranaki	7	(10)
1998	Wellington		
2000–2001	Wanganui	18	(10)
International career
Years	Team	Apps	(Points)
1997–1999	Samoa	6	(10)

Robert Anthony Ale (born 4 September 1973) is a Samoan rugby union player. He plays as a prop.

== Career ==
His first international cap was during a match against Tonga, at Apia, on 28 June 1997. He was part of the 1999 Rugby World Cup roster, replacing the injured Fosi Pala'amo, where he played 4 matches. In the NPC he played for South Canterbury, Taranaki and Wanganui.
