= Filipo Toala =

Samoa international rugby union player (born 1973)

- Born: 2 August 1973 (age 53) Apia, Samoa

Rugby union career
- Position: Wing
Senior career
Years	Team	Apps	(Points)
1999–2004	Stade Rochelais	95	(127)
–	Eastwood		
Provincial / State sides
Years	Team	Apps	(Points)
1997–1999	Taranaki	24	(25)
International career
Years	Team	Apps	(Points)
1998–2000	Samoa	6	(5)

Filipo Toala (born 2 August 1973 in Apia) is a former Samoan rugby union player. He played as a wing.

== Career ==
His first international cap was against Fiji, at Canberra, on 22 September 1998. He was part of the 1999 Rugby World Cup, playing one match. His last international cap was against Scotland, at Murrayfield, on 18 November 2000. He played in the NPC for Taranaki between 1997 and 1999. A year later, he moved to France, to play for Stade Rochelais, where he was nicknamed Le Tigre d'Apia (The Tiger of Apia). He ended his career in 2005, playing for Eastwood Rugby Club.
