= Courtney Smith (rugby union) =

Canada international rugby union player

- Born: Courtney Dwight Smith; 14 April 1971 Kingston, Jamaica
- Height: 179 cm (5 ft 10 in)
- Weight: 88 kg (13 st 12 lb)

Rugby union career
- Position: Wing
Amateur team(s)
Years	Team	Apps	(Points)
- Meraloma Rugby
–	London Scottish,		
International career
Years	Team	Apps	(Points)
1995-1999	Canada	21	(40)

Courtney "Cortz" Smith (born April 14, 1971 in Kingston, Jamaica) is a Canadian retired professional rugby player.

== International ==
Played twice against All-Japan on Canada's Under 23 tour in 1993 and has since been to Europe and then to Fiji and New Zealand with Canada winning his first cap against the Uruguay in '95. Played against Japan and Hong Kong in Pac Rim '96 scoring a try against Japan. Scored two tries against the US in 1996 Pan Am. Suffered an unfortunate broken arm in first match of the Pac Rim '97 and missed further caps. Toured Ireland with Canada in Nov. 1997 and scored two tries for Rugby Canada in the Welsh Challenge Cup and three more in four Pac Rim tests in 1998.

== Premier and club ==
Club rugby included Ontario Premiership rugby for Balmy Beach and the Meraloma Rugby club Premier Division for the Canadian Direct British Columbia's Premiership League.
