= Giampiero Mazzi =

Italian rugby union coach and former player

Giampiero Mazzi (born 14 October 1974) is an Italian rugby union coach and former player who played as a scrum-half.

Born in Frascati, Lazio, Mazzi played all his career at Rugby Roma Olimpic, becoming a member of the first category in 1994/95. He played there until 2008/09. He won the titles of the Italian Championship in 1999/2000, and the Cup of Italy in 1997/98. He became the coach of the Rugby Roma Olimpic U-20 after finishing his career.

Mazzi won five caps for the Italy national team between 1998 and 1999, scoring 1 try. He was selected for the 1999 Rugby World Cup but did not play.
