= Ryuji Ishii =

Japan international rugby union player

- Born: March 13, 1970 (age 56) Fukuoka, Japan
- Height: 6 ft 0 in (1.83 m)
- Weight: 204 lb (93 kg; 14.6 st)
- School: Miyoshi High School, Tokushima

Rugby union career
- Position: Flanker
Senior career
Years	Team	Apps	(Points)
1993-2000	Toyota Verblitz		
International career
Years	Team	Apps	(Points)
1999	Japan	1	(0)

Ryuji Ishii (石井 龍司, Ishii Ryūji; born Fukuoka, 13 March 1970) is a Japanese former rugby union player. He played as flanker.

== Career ==
At club level, Ishii played throughout all of his career for Toyota Verblitz until his retirement. His only cap for Japan was against Spain, in Tokyo, on 20 August 1999. He was called up to play in the 1999 Rugby World Cup squad, but he never played any match in the tournament. Between 2004 and 2010, Ishi was appointed as manager for Toyota Verblitz.
