= Moataʻa =

Coordinates: 13°50′S 171°45′W

Moataʻa is a village on the island of Upolu in Samoa. It is situated on the central north coast of the island, and falls within the urban conglomeration surrounding Samoa's capital, Apia. The village is located 2.5 km east of central Apia and lies within the political district of Tuamasaga.

The village has between 300 and 500 homes and as of the 2016 census, the population was 1,412.

== Geography ==
Moataʻa is located in a low-lying area within the floodplain of the Vaisigano River, surrounding a mangrove swamp. The mangrove swamp currently covers around 5 hectares, having declined from around 20 hectares in the 1970s, due to land reclamation as the village expanded. The mangroves constitute a rich and diverse ecosystem which is an important habitat for crustaceans, birds, fish and reptiles. The mangroves have faced environmental issues including contamination from sewerage and runoff from the surrounding urban areas, and decline in area due to reclamation. The village has taken steps to protect the mangroves such as instituting a ban on cutting the mangroves and redesigning a causeway to enhance the movement of water, nutrients and fauna across the mangrove system. The Moataʻa mangroves were also the focus of a restoration project funded by the United States embassy in Apia.

Due to its low-lying nature, Moataʻa faces serious challenges with coastal innundation. In recent years, these issues have been exacerbated by climate change, leading to shoreline erosion, worsening flooding and a reduction in the availability of marine life locals traditionally catch. While historically the mangroves providing good protection from the tides, due to rising sea levels and a decline in mangove health, the natural protection they offer is no longer as effective. Today, sea water reaches the doorsteps of homes behind the mangrove conservation area on a daily basis, carrying rubbish into local's backyards. As a result, local residents have been lobbying for the construction of a seawall to protect their homes.

== Chiefly titles ==
Several notable people have been bestowed chiefly titles by the village. In September 2022, New Zealand-born actor KJ Apa was bestowed the title of Savaʻe chief of the village. KJ Apa's uncle and former All Black, Sir Michael Jones also holds the Savaʻe title along with the Laʻauli title. In October 2024, when King Charles III visited Samoa to attend the 2024 Commonwealth Heads of Government Meeting, Moataʻa bestowed him the Tui Taumeasina (high chief) title.

== Sports ==
Moataʻa has a rugby club, Moataʻa Rugby Club, which celebrated its centenary in 2025. Moataʻa also has a football club, Moataʻa FC.

== Notable people ==
- Frank Molloy, Samoan-born New Zealand professional golfer
