= Craig Glendinning =

- Born: Craig Rau Glendinning; 12 January 1973 (age 53) Ōtāhuhu, New Zealand
- Height: 1.83 m (6 ft 0 in)
- Weight: 95 kg (210 lb)

Rugby union career
- Position: Flanker
Senior career
Years	Team	Apps	(Points)
1997	Benetton Treviso		
Provincial / State sides
Years	Team	Apps	(Points)
1995–97, 2002–03	Counties Manukau	38	(15)
1998	Northland	6	(5)
2000	Southland	4	(0)
International career
Years	Team	Apps	(Points)
1997	New Zealand Māori	3	(5)
1999–2001	Samoa	22	(5)

Craig Rau Glendinning (born 12 January 1973) is a former New Zealand rugby union player, who represented both New Zealand Māori and Samoa. He usually played as a flanker.

== Career ==
Born in Ōtāhuhu, Glendinning played provincial rugby for Counties Manukau, Northland, and Southland. Of Māori descent, he played three matches for New Zealand Māori in 1997, before going on to play for Samoa between 1999 and 2001. His first cap for Samoa as a number 8 against Japan, at Osaka, on 22 May 1999. He played three matches for Samoa at the 1999 Rugby World Cup. His final cap for Samoa was against Fiji, at Tokyo, on 8 July 2001.
