= Onehunga Matauiau =

Samoa international rugby union player

- Born: Onehunga Mata'uiau-Esau; 9 November 1975 (age 51) Apia, Samoa
- Height: 5 ft 11 in (1.80 m)
- Weight: 212 lb (96 kg)

Rugby union career
Senior career
Years	Team	Apps	(Points)
1996-2000	Waitemata	10	(10)
Provincial / State sides
Years	Team	Apps	(Points)
2000	Hawkes Bay		
International career
Years	Team	Apps	(Points)
1996–2000	Samoa	9	(0)

Onehunga Mata'uiau-Esau (born 9 November 1975 in Apia) is a Samoan former rugby union player and coach. He played as a hooker. As of April 2015, he coached Central Queensland.

== Career ==
His first international cap was earned during a match against Tonga at Apia on July 13, 1996. He was part of the 1999 Rugby World Cup roster, where he played in three matches. His last international cap was against Scotland at Murrayfield on November 18, 2000. He also played in the NPC for Hawke's Bay.
