= Naoto Nakamura (rugby union) =

Japan international rugby union player

- Born: January 18, 1969 (age 57) Kyoto Prefecture, Japan
- Height: 5 ft 10 in (178 cm)
- Weight: 220 lb (100 kg)

Rugby union career
- Position: Prop
Amateur team(s)
Years	Team	Apps	(Points)
-1998	Doshisha University RFC		
Senior career
Years	Team	Apps	(Points)
1998-2000	Suntory		
International career
Years	Team	Apps	(Points)
1998-2000	Japan	20	(10)
Coaching career
- Years: Team
- 2012: Canon Eagles (scrum coach)

Naoto Nakamura (中村直人, Nakamura Naoto) (born 18 January 1969) is a Japanese former rugby union player who played as prop. He played 20 tests for the Japan national rugby union team including two matches in 1999 Rugby World Cup. Currently he is the scrum coach for Canon Eagles.

== Career ==
After his graduation from Doshisha University, Nakamura started to play for Suntory throughout all of his career, with which he won the All-Japan Rugby Football Championship in 1996. He was first capped for Japan on 3 May 1998, against Canada, in Tokyo. He was also present at the 1999 Rugby World Cup, where he played two matches in the tournament. Nakamura's last cap for Japan was against Ireland, at Lansdowne Road, on 11 November 2000.
