= Agustín Malet =

Spain international rugby union player

- Born: 7 July 1967 (age 59) Sevilla, Andalucia, Spain
- Height: 6 ft 2 in (1.88 m)
- Weight: 224 lb (102 kg)

Rugby union career
- Position: Number 8
Senior career
Years	Team	Apps	(Points)
- CD Universidad de Sevilla
International career
Years	Team	Apps	(Points)
1997-1999	Spain	4	(0)

Agustín Malet Raga (born 7 July 1967) is a Spanish rugby union player. He plays as a back-row.

== Career ==
His first international cap was during a match against Andorra, at Andorra la Vella, on 8 November 1997. He was part of the 1999 Rugby World Cup roster, playing two matches.
