= Daniel Chiriac =

Romanian rugby union player

- Born: Daniel Chiriac; 8 June 1973 (age 53) Constanța, Romania
- Height: 6 ft 5 in (196 cm)
- Weight: 233 lb (106 kg)

Rugby union career
- Position: Lock
Senior career
Years	Team	Apps	(Points)
- Farul Constanța
Provincial / State sides
Years	Team	Apps	(Points)
1995–1998	Farul Constanța	7	(5)
International career
Years	Team	Apps	(Points)
1999–2001	Romania	5	(0)

Daniel Chiriac (born 8 June 1973 in Constanța) is a former Romanian rugby union player. He played as a lock.

== Club career ==
During his career, Chiriac played for RCJ Farul Constanța in Romania with whom he played in European competitions.

== International career ==
Chiriac received five caps for Romania, from his debut in 1999 against Scotland to his last game in 2001 against Netherlands. He was a member of the national side for the 5th Rugby World Cup in 1999, where he played three matches in the East Group against Australia, USA and Ireland.
