= Laurențiu Rotaru =

Romanian rugby union player and coach

- Full name: Laurențiu Rotaru
- Born: 19 January 1970 (age 56) Botoșani, Romania
- Height: 1.85 m (6 ft 1 in)
- Weight: 104 kg (16 st 5 lb; 229 lb)

Rugby union career
- Position: Prop
Senior career
| Years | Team | Apps | (Points) |
- Farul Constanța
- Correct as of 8 March 2020
Provincial / State sides
| Years | Team | Apps | (Points) |
| 1997 | Farul Constanța | 5 | (5) |
International career
| Years | Team | Apps | (Points) |
| 1999 | Romania | 3 | (0) |
- Correct as of 8 March 2020

Laurențiu Rotaru (born 19 January 1970) is a Romanian former rugby union football player. He played as a prop. He also played for Romania's national team, the Oaks, making his international debut in a match against the Le XV de France.

== Club career ==
Laurențiu Rotaru played during his career for professional SuperLiga club, Farul Constanța. He also played with Farul in the European Rugby Challenge Cup competition.

== International career ==
Rotaru was selected for 4th Rugby World Cup in 1999, playing two test matches against Australia and Ireland.
