= Oscar Astarloa =

Spanish rugby union player (born 1974)

- Born: 6 September 1974 (age 52) Elgoibar, Basque Country, Spain
- Height: 6 ft 3 in (1.91 m)
- Weight: 201 lb (91 kg)
- Occupation: Wood cutter

Rugby union career
- Position(s): Lock, Flanker
Amateur team(s)
Years	Team	Apps	(Points)
1988-1993	Elorrio Rugby Taldea		
Senior career
Years	Team	Apps	(Points)
1993-1997	Getxo Rugby Taldea		
1997-2004	Saint-Jean-de-Luz		
2004-2006	Aviron Bayonnais		
2006-2009	Ordizia RE		
2009-2011	Bera Bera RT		
2009	Basque Korsarioak		
2011-2015	Gernika RT		
2015-2018	Durango RT		
2018-2019	Hernani CRE		
International career
Years	Team	Apps	(Points)
1998-2006	Spain	20	(5)
Coaching career
- Years: Team
- 2014-2015: Gernika RT
- 2019: Spain U-19

Oskar Astarloa Uriarte (born 6 September 1974 in Elgoibar) is a Spanish former rugby union player and currently coach. He plays as an open-side lock and flanker. He currently coaches Spain national under-19 rugby union team.

== Career ==
His first international cap was during a match against Germany, at Heidelberg, on 26 April 1998. He was part of the 1999 Rugby World Cup roster, playing all the three matches as first choice. His last cap was during a match against Georgia, at Tbilisi, on 28 October 2006. He also took part at the 2001 Rugby World Cup Sevens in Argentina.
