= Alfonso Mata =

- Born: 14 March 1976 (age 50) Valladolid, Spain
- Height: 6 ft 2 in (1.88 m)
- Weight: 205 lb (93 kg)

Rugby union career
- Position(s): Flanker, Number 8
Senior career
Years	Team	Apps	(Points)
- El Salvador Rugby
International career
Years	Team	Apps	(Points)
1998-2008	Spain	50	(15)

Alfonso Mata Suárez (born Valladolid, 14 March 1976) is a Spanish rugby union player. He plays as a flanker and number 8.

== Career ==
His first international cap was during a match against Portugal, at Murrayfield, on December 2, 1998. He was also part of the 1999 Rugby World Cup roster, where he played all the three matches. His last international cap was during a match against Romania, at Madrid, on February 23, 2008.
