= Fernando Díaz Alberdi =

Argentine rugby union player (born 1972)

- Born: July 2, 1972 (age 54)
- Height: 5 ft 11 in (1.80 m)
- Weight: 238 lb (108 kg; 17 st 0 lb)

Rugby union career
- Position: Prop
Senior career
Years	Team	Apps	(Points)
1990-2001	Club Universitario de Buenos Aires		
International career
Years	Team	Apps	(Points)
1997-2000	Argentina	5	(5)

Fernando Díaz Alberdi (born July 2, 1972, in Buenos Aires) is a former Argentine rugby union prop, now he has a vice president position at Tenaris and resides in Dubai.

He was playing at Club Universitario de Buenos Aires team, when he was selected for the Argentina Squad that entered the 1999 Rugby World Cup finals. He was never used. He played 6 times for the "Pumas", from 1997 to 2000, scoring 1 try, 5 points in aggregate. He had to leave competition in 2001, due to a serious injury. While playing rugby, he studied in the Universidad Catolica Argentina, getting the Industrial Engineering degree in 1998.

After leaving the competition in 2001, he works in different companies of the Techint Group in different countries, including Kazakhstan, Norway and UAE.

He continues to be involved in rugby. He had coached the Club Universitario de Buenos Aires first team for five years, achieving four times the Semifinals of Buenos Aires Rugby Union (URBA) tournament. When moving to Kazakhstan in 2008, he has developed a youth rugby team in Almaty and advised the national team, which qualified for playoff stages. From 2013 to 2015, he coached a junior colt team in Stavanger (Norway). In 2015 he moved back to Argentina and coached different Club Universitario de Buenos Aires colt teams for three years. Currently in Dubai, he has been coaching different teams, including the development of girls rugby for UAE Hurricanes.
