= Lama Tone =

- Born: 24 January 1971 (age 55) Auckland, New Zealand
- Height: 6 ft 6 in (1.98 m)
- Weight: 231 lb (105 kg)

Rugby union career
Amateur team(s)
Years	Team	Apps	(Points)
1998	Manurewa		
Provincial / State sides
Years	Team	Apps	(Points)
1998	Counties Manukau	2	(0)
International career
Years	Team	Apps	(Points)
1998–2001	Samoa	24	(0)

Lama Tone (born 24 January 1971 in Auckland) is a New Zealand-born Samoan rugby union player. He plays as a lock.

== Career ==
His first international cap was during a match against Tonga, at Sydney, on 18 September 1998. He was part of the 1999 Rugby World Cup roster, playing 4 matches. His last international cap was during a match against Fiji, at Tokyo, on 8 July 2001. He also played for Counties Manukau in the NPC.

== Personal life ==
Tone currently works as architect.
