= Stadion MOSiR =

Stadion MOSiR ("MOSiR Stadium") may refer to various stadiums in Poland, including:

- Stadion MOSiR (Bystrzyca)
- Stadion MOSiR (Gdańsk) – now known as Gdańsk Sports Center Stadium
- Stadion MOSiR (Stalowa Wola)
- Stadion MOSiR (Wodzisław Śląski)
