= Kepi Faiva'ai =

- Born: 19 April 1970 (age 56) Wellington, New Zealand
- Height: 5 ft 11 in (1.80 m)
- Weight: 258 lb (117 kg)

Rugby union career
- Position: Prop
Amateur team(s)
Years	Team	Apps	(Points)
1996-1998	Johnsonville		
1998-1999	Ories Rugby Club		
2000-2001	Johnsonville		
Provincial / State sides
Years	Team	Apps	(Points)
1998-1999	Wellington	10	(5)
2000-2001	Marlborough	16	(10)
International career
Years	Team	Apps	(Points)
1998-1999	Samoa	9	(0)

Lemo Felise Kepi Faiva'ai (born 19 April 1970 in Wellington) is a New Zealand-born Samoan former rugby union player. He played as

== Career ==
His first international cap was against Tonga, at Sydney, on 18 September 1998. He was part of the 1999 Rugby World Cup squad, although he didn't play in any match. His last international cap was against Fiji, at Lautoka, on 3 July 1999.
