= Toshikazu Nakamichi =

Japan international rugby union player

- Born: July 16, 1971 (age 55) Osaka, Japan
- Height: 5 ft 9 in (1.75 m)
- Weight: 224 lb (102 kg)
- University: Doshisha University

Rugby union career
- Position(s): Hooker, Prop
Amateur team(s)
Years	Team	Apps	(Points)
198?-199?	Doshisha University Rugby Football Club		
Senior career
Years	Team	Apps	(Points)
1991-2004	Kobe Steel	13	(5)
International career
Years	Team	Apps	(Points)
1996-2000	Japan	16	(0)

Toshikazu Nakamichi (中道紀和, Nakamichi Toshikazu) (born Osaka, 16 July 1971) is a Japanese former rugby union player who played usually as hooker or as prop. He earned 16 caps without scoring in his international career.

== Career ==
After his graduation from Doshisha University, Nakamichi joined Kobe Steel. He was part of the Kobe squad which dominated the Japanese rugby scene in the early 1990s. He debuted for the Japan's national team against Hong Kong in Tokyo, on 11 May 1996. He was called up by the then-national coach Seiji Hirao for the 1999 Rugby World Cup squad, playing two matches in the tournament. His last cap for Japan was against Tonga, in Tokyo, on 3 June 2000.
