= Francois van Rensburg =

Namibia international rugby union footballer

- Born: February 23, 1974 (age 52) Windhoek, Namibia
- Height: 5 ft 11 in (1.80 m)
- Weight: 193 lb (88 kg; 13 st 11 lb)

Rugby union career
- Position: Centre
International career
Years	Team	Apps	(Points)
1995-2001	Namibia	15	(10)

Francois van Rensburg (born Windhoek, 23 February 1974) is a Namibian former rugby union footballer. He played as a centre and as a fly-half. His profession was a farmer.

He had 15 caps for Namibia, from 1995 to 2001, scoring 2 tries, 10 points in aggregate. He played three games at the 1999 Rugby World Cup finals, where his country entered for the first time.
