= Antonio Socías =

- Born: July 12, 1970 (age 56) Valencia, Spain
- Height: 5 ft 11 in (1.80 m)
- Weight: 180 lb (82 kg)
- Notable relative(s): Alberto Socías; Raquel Socías
- Occupation: Post-graduate student

Rugby union career
- Position: Wing
Senior career
Years	Team	Apps	(Points)
-	RC Valencia		
International career
Years	Team	Apps	(Points)
1998-2001	Spain	10	(5)

Antonio Socías Olmos (born Valencia, 12 July 1970) is a Spanish rugby union player. He plays as a wing. He is the brother of Alberto Socías and Raquel Socías, who also were a Spanish internationals.

== Career ==
His first international cap was during a match against Germany at Heidelberg, on April 26, 1998. He was part of the 1999 Rugby World Cup roster. His last international cap was during a match against Australia, at Madrid, on November 1, 2001.
