= David Rees (rugby union, born 1974) =

England international rugby union player

David Rees (born 15 October 1974) is a former Bristol Rugby player, who gained 11 caps for England between 1997 and 1999, scoring three tries.

Sale where he was first selected to play for England. Fourth cap on 6 December 1997 at Twickenham when facing legendary Jonah Lomu. With about 5 minutes gone, New Zealand won a penalty in their own 22. The All black fly-half Andrew Mehrtens kicked cross-field and found Rees on his right wing. Rees counter-attacked, chipped over the head of Lomu. He collected the ball, sidestepped round Zinzan Brooke's cover tackle and scored in the corner. The try sparked England on to a 23-9 half-time lead, though the All Blacks fought back in the second half with the match ending in a 26–26 draw.

He also scored two tries against Wales in a 1998 Five Nations Championship game.

In 1999 he moved to Bristol, and moved to Leeds Tykes in 2003 after Bristol were relegated. Later, in 2006, he moved to Newbury R.F.C. In the 2008–2009 season he joined Clifton.
