= Alberto Socías =

Spain international rugby union player

- Born: 16 May 1973 (age 53) Valencia, Spain
- Height: 6 ft 0 in (1.83 m)
- Weight: 210 lb (95 kg)
- Notable relative(s): Antonio Socías; Raquel Socías

Rugby union career
- Position: Centre
Senior career
Years	Team	Apps	(Points)
- RC Valencia
–	CR Les Abelles		
International career
Years	Team	Apps	(Points)
1994–2002	Spain	25	(25)
2001	Spain 7s		
Coaching career
- Years: Team
- 2012-2015: Spain 7s
- 2015-2021: CR Les Abelles
- 2023: Spain 7s
- 2023-2024: Spain Women's 7s

Alberto Socías Olmos (born 16 May 1973) is a former Spanish rugby union player and coach. He played as a centre.

He is the brother of Antonio Socías and Raquel Socías, who also were former Spanish internationals.

He is currently the Technical Director of Rugby Seven of the RFER.

== Career ==
His first international cap was during a match against Italy, on 7 May 1994, at Parma. He was part of the 1999 Rugby World Cup roster, where he played two matches. His last international cap was during a match against Netherlands, on 6 April 2002 at Murcia.

=== Coaching career ===
He coached the Spain national rugby sevens team from 2012 until 2015, when he José Ignacio Inchausti replaced Socías due to criteria differences with the FER. He coached Les Abelles between 2015 and 2020/2021.

In 2023, he was appointed alongside Francisco Hernández coaches of the Spain 7s, although Alberto was later appointed head coach of the Spain Women's 7s. On August 30, 2024, he was replaced as coach of the women's rugby 7s team by María Ribera, although he would continue to work with the Spanish Rugby Federation in the technical direction of rugby 7.
