= Atsushi Koga (rugby union) =

Japanese rugby union player

- Born: February 25, 1975 (age 51) Kanagawa Prefecture, Japan
- Height: 174 cm (5 ft 9 in)
- Weight: 88 kg (194 lb)
- School: Fujisawa Nichidai High School
- University: Yamanashi Gakuin University

Rugby union career
- Position: Centre
Senior career
Years	Team	Apps	(Points)
1996-2008	Sanyo Wild Knights	5	(0)
International career
Years	Team	Apps	(Points)
1999	Japan	0	(0)

Atsushi Koga (古賀淳, Koga Atsushi), sometimes translated erroneously as Jun Koga, (born Kanagawa Prefecture, 25 February 1975) is a Japanese former rugby union player who played as Centre.

== Career ==
After his graduation from Yamanashi Gakuin University, for whose rugby club he played, Koga joined Sanyo Wild Knights, where he played throughout all of his career until his retirement in 2008. He was also part of the 1999 Rugby World Cup squad, but he never had a cap for Japan.
