= Cătălin Drăguceanu =

Catalin Drăguceanu
- Born: Catalin Sebastian Drăguceanu; 19 November 1970 (age 55) Mediaș, Romania
- Height: 6 ft 3 in (191 cm)
- Weight: 235 lb (107 kg)

Rugby union career
- Position: Wing
Senior career
Years	Team	Apps	(Points)
1992-2000	Steaua		
International career
Years	Team	Apps	(Points)
1994–2000	Romania	35	(20)

Catalin Sebastian Drăguceanu (born 19 November 1970) in Mediaș, is a former Romanian rugby union football player. He played as a Number Eight. He was the Captain of Romanian Rugby Union team. Played for the Rugby Union World Cup in 1995.

== Club career ==
He mostly played for Steaua during his career. He also played for West Club Brisbane in Australia.

== International career ==
Drăguceanu gathered 35 caps for Romania, from his debut in 1994 to his last game in 2000. He scored 4 tries during his international career, 20 points on aggregate. He was a member of his national side for the 3rd and 4th Rugby World Cups in 1995 and 1999.
