= Etuate Manu =

Kingdom of Tonga rugby player

- Born: 9 September 1969 (age 57) Tonga
- Height: 6 ft 6 in (1.98 m)
- Weight: 231 lb (105 kg)

Rugby union career
- Position: Centre
Amateur team(s)
Years	Team	Apps	(Points)
- Renwick
–	Spotswood United		
Provincial / State sides
Years	Team	Apps	(Points)
1993	Marlborough	9	(10)
1995-1996	Taranaki	19	(40)
International career
Years	Team	Apps	(Points)
1996–1999	Tonga	6	(5)

Etuate Manu, known also as Etu Manu (born 9 September 1969) is a Tongan former rugby union player who played as centre.

== Career ==
At club level, Manu played in the National Provincial Championship initially in 1993 for Marlborough, and later in 1996 and 1997 for Taranaki. At international level, he was first capped for Tonga on 13 July 1996 against Samoa, in Apia. He was also part of the 1999 Rugby World Cup Tonga squad, but did not play any match in the tournament due to his dismissal in the repechage stage against Korea. His last cap for Tonga was on 15 May 1999, against United States in San Francisco.
