= Ovidiu Slușariuc =

- Born: Ovidiu Ștefan Slușariuc; 7 February 1968 (age 58) Suceava, Romania
- Height: 6 ft 3 in (191 cm)
- Weight: 241 lb (109 kg)

Rugby union career
- Position: Number 8
Senior career
Years	Team	Apps	(Points)
- CSM Suceava
- Dinamo București
International career
Years	Team	Apps	(Points)
1993–1999	Romania	16	(5)

Ovidiu Ștefan Slușariuc (born 7 February 1968) is a Romanian former rugby union football player. He played as a No. 8.

== Club career ==
During his career Slușariuc played for Romanian clubs CSM Suceava and Dinamo București.

== International career ==
Slușariuc gathered 16 caps for Romania, from his debut in 1991 to his last game in 1999. He scored 1 try during his international career, 5 points on aggregate. He was a member of his national side for the 3rd and 4th Rugby World Cups in 1995 and 1999 and played 2 group matches without scoring.
