= Mihai Ciolacu =

Romania international rugby union player

- Born: Mihai Leonard Ciolacu; 11 September 1977 (age 49) Constanța, Romania
- Height: 6 ft 0 in (183 cm)
- Weight: 191 lb (87 kg)

Rugby union career
- Position(s): Wing, Fly-half
Senior career
Years	Team	Apps	(Points)
- Farul Constanța
- Albertville
International career
Years	Team	Apps	(Points)
1998–2001	Romania	10	(12)

Mihai Ciolacu (born 11 September 1977 in Constanța) is a former Romanian rugby union player. He played as a wing and also as a fly-half.

== Club career ==
During his career, Ciolacu played mostly for Farul Constanța in Romania, and for a period of time for Albertville in France.

== International career ==
Ciolacu gathered 10 caps for Romania, first in 1998 against Ukraine and the last one in 2001 against England. During his career, Ciolacu scored 2 tries and a conversion, 12 points on aggregate. He was a member of his national side for the 5th Rugby World Cup in 1999.

== Honours ==
Farul Constanța

- SuperLiga: 1996–97
