= List of Tonga national rugby union players =

List of Tonga national rugby union players is a list of people who have played for the Tonga national rugby union team. The list only includes players who have played in a Test match.

Note that the "position" column lists the position at which the player made his Test debut, not necessarily the position for which he is best known. A position in parentheses indicates that the player debuted as a substitute.

== List ==
Tonga's international rugby capped players
Number	Name	Position	Date first cap obtained	Opposition
1	O. Faupula		25 August 1924	v Fiji at Nukuʻalofa
2	Te. Fifita		25 August 1924	v Fiji at Nukuʻalofa
3	Afu Fifita		25 August 1924	v Fiji at Nukuʻalofa
4	Sione Finau		25 August 1924	v Fiji at Nukuʻalofa
5	Tevita Finau		25 August 1924	v Fiji at Nukuʻalofa
6	L. Fineanganofo		25 August 1924	v Fiji at Nukuʻalofa
7	S. Halahingalo		25 August 1924	v Fiji at Nukuʻalofa
8	S. Halaholo		25 August 1924	v Fiji at Nukuʻalofa
9	Taniela Haumono		25 August 1924	v Fiji at Nukuʻalofa
10	T. Havea		25 August 1924	v Fiji at Nukuʻalofa
11	Peni Katoa		25 August 1924	v Fiji at Nukuʻalofa
12	M. Liongitau		25 August 1924	v Fiji at Nukuʻalofa
13	E. Moʻungaloa		25 August 1924	v Fiji at Nukuʻalofa
14	P. Palavi		25 August 1924	v Fiji at Nukuʻalofa
15	S. Pifalati		25 August 1924	v Fiji at Nukuʻalofa
16	Sione Selupe		25 August 1924	v Fiji at Nukuʻalofa
17	Peni Sikalu		25 August 1924	v Fiji at Nukuʻalofa
18	Sione Simiki		25 August 1924	v Fiji at Nukuʻalofa
19	Tevita Tofua		25 August 1924	v Fiji at Nukuʻalofa
20	Naʻa Tovo		25 August 1924	v Fiji at Nukuʻalofa
21	Aisea Tupou		25 August 1924	v Fiji at Nukuʻalofa
22	S. Vakaʻuta		25 August 1924	v Fiji at Nukuʻalofa
23	Sione Kuila		3 September 1924	v Fiji at Nukuʻalofa
24	Peni Ake	prop	14 August 1926	v Fiji at Suva
25	J. Fakalolo	lock	14 August 1926	v Fiji at Suva
26	J. Fukofuka	wing	14 August 1926	v Fiji at Suva
27	Aminiasi Kefu	centre	14 August 1926	v Fiji at Suva
28	Moahegi Latunipulu	prop	14 August 1926	v Fiji at Suva
29	Amone Lino	fullback	14 August 1926	v Fiji at Suva
30	Sione Misa	fly-half	14 August 1926	v Fiji at Suva
31	Tevita Sitanilei	scrum-half	14 August 1926	v Fiji at Suva
32	Viliami Taufatofua	no. 8	14 August 1926	v Fiji at Suva
33	Simione Tufui	wing	14 August 1926	v Fiji at Suva
34	Esei Tuʻipolotu	centre	14 August 1926	v Fiji at Suva
35	S. Akauʻola		25 August 1928	v Fiji at Nukuʻalofa
36	Samiuela Fonua		25 August 1928	v Fiji at Nukuʻalofa
37	Tevita Fuataimi		25 August 1928	v Fiji at Nukuʻalofa
38	Faʻaitu Hafoka		25 August 1928	v Fiji at Nukuʻalofa
39	Isitolo Hafoka		25 August 1928	v Fiji at Nukuʻalofa
40	L. Kainga		25 August 1928	v Fiji at Nukuʻalofa
41	T. Langi		25 August 1928	v Fiji at Nukuʻalofa
42	Sione Leba		25 August 1928	v Fiji at Nukuʻalofa
43	F. Mailangi		25 August 1928	v Fiji at Nukuʻalofa
44	S. Mateaki		25 August 1928	v Fiji at Nukuʻalofa
45	Suli Moa		25 August 1928	v Fiji at Nukuʻalofa
46	Osaisai Pepa Koloamatangii		25 August 1928	v Fiji at Nukuʻalofa
47	Sione T. Puloka		25 August 1928	v Fiji at Nukuʻalofa
48	Pauli Taumoepeau		25 August 1928	v Fiji at Nukuʻalofa
49	L. Tuʻuta		25 August 1928	v Fiji at Nukuʻalofa
50	Saia Vaea		25 August 1928	v Fiji at Nukuʻalofa
51	Sione Finisi Heleta		1 September 1928	v Fiji at Nukuʻalofa
52	Ilaikimi Omani		1 September 1928	v Fiji at Nukuʻalofa
53	Sefesi Ata	wing	8 September 1928	v Fiji at Nukuʻalofa
54	Tevita Alatini	scrum-half	27 August 1932	v Fiji at Suva
55	Osaiasi Beba	centre	27 August 1932	v Fiji at Suva
56	Tomasi Soaiti	wing	27 August 1932	v Fiji at Suva
57	Siosi Tuʻitavake	lock	27 August 1932	v Fiji at Suva
58	Visa Vaka	prop	27 August 1932	v Fiji at Suva
59	Viliami Vuni	wing	27 August 1932	v Fiji at Suva
60	Sione Buloka	centre	31 August 1932	v Fiji at Suva
61	Joasina Kaihau	centre	31 August 1932	v Fiji at Suva
62	Sione Laiseni	hooker	31 August 1932	v Fiji at Suva
63	Sione Vikilani	prop	31 August 1932	v Fiji at Suva
64	Siu Aisake		8 August 1934	v Fiji at Nukuʻalofa
65	Masiu Akauʻola		8 August 1934	v Fiji at Nukuʻalofa
66	Tonga Faleola		8 August 1934	v Fiji at Nukuʻalofa
67	Simione Fangupo		8 August 1934	v Fiji at Nukuʻalofa
68	Fine Fifita		8 August 1934	v Fiji at Nukuʻalofa
69	Lisala Fifita		8 August 1934	v Fiji at Nukuʻalofa
70	Siua Kaihau		8 August 1934	v Fiji at Nukuʻalofa
71	Timote Mafi		8 August 1934	v Fiji at Nukuʻalofa
72	Viliami Moeaki		8 August 1934	v Fiji at Nukuʻalofa
73	Sione Napaʻa		8 August 1934	v Fiji at Nukuʻalofa
74	Tevita Piukala		8 August 1934	v Fiji at Nukuʻalofa
75	Henele Taliai		8 August 1934	v Fiji at Nukuʻalofa
76	Sione Tunufaʻi		8 August 1934	v Fiji at Nukuʻalofa
77	Tevita Unga		8 August 1934	v Fiji at Nukuʻalofa
78	Tevita Apitani	prop	26 July 1947	v Fiji at Suva
79	Samiuela Fotu	lock	26 July 1947	v Fiji at Suva
80	Mesiu Ilolahia	centre	26 July 1947	v Fiji at Suva
81	Tevita Kaufana	lock	26 July 1947	v Fiji at Suva
82	Valita Likio	fly-half	26 July 1947	v Fiji at Suva
83	Tongatoutei Maʻu	no. 8	26 July 1947	v Fiji at Suva
84	Valeti Maʻu	prop	26 July 1947	v Fiji at Suva
85	Sione Moʻungalo	flanker	26 July 1947	v Fiji at Suva
86	Sini Pouanga	centre	26 July 1947	v Fiji at Suva
87	Tevita Samiu	scrum-half	26 July 1947	v Fiji at Suva
88	Makoni Sifa	wing	26 July 1947	v Fiji at Suva
89	Kuli Tonga	flanker	26 July 1947	v Fiji at Suva
90	Malakai Tonga	hooker	26 July 1947	v Fiji at Suva
91	Soane Tuʻipulotu	wing	26 July 1947	v Fiji at Suva
92	Sione Valeli	fullback	26 July 1947	v Fiji at Suva
93	Mr Inoke	flanker	30 July 1947	v Fiji at Suva
94	Mr Malu	fullback	30 July 1947	v Fiji at Suva
95	Tuifio Taufa Aloua		2 August 1958	v Fiji at Nukuʻalofa
96	Kisione Fifita		2 August 1958	v Fiji at Nukuʻalofa
97	Samiu Halaʻunga		2 August 1958	v Fiji at Nukuʻalofa
98	Mafileʻo Kefu		2 August 1958	v Fiji at Nukuʻalofa
99	Sele Latukefu		2 August 1958	v Fiji at Nukuʻalofa
100	Samiuela Mafana		2 August 1958	v Fiji at Nukuʻalofa
101	Lutu Mailangi		2 August 1958	v Fiji at Nukuʻalofa
102	Tevita Moli		2 August 1958	v Fiji at Nukuʻalofa
103	Sione Nauvai		2 August 1958	v Fiji at Nukuʻalofa
104	Tevita Sika		2 August 1958	v Fiji at Nukuʻalofa
105	Sione Tavo		2 August 1958	v Fiji at Nukuʻalofa
106	Talaiasi Teu		2 August 1958	v Fiji at Nukuʻalofa
107	Paula Tevi		2 August 1958	v Fiji at Nukuʻalofa
108	Isikeli Vakaʻuta		2 August 1958	v Fiji at Nukuʻalofa
109	Sione Vunipola		2 August 1958	v Fiji at Nukuʻalofa
110	Finau Otutoa		9 August 1958	v Fiji at Nukuʻalofa
111	Pauli Maʻafu	wing	26 September 1959	v Fiji at Suva
112	Kalisi Moala	flanker	26 September 1959	v Fiji at Suva
113	Lausiʻi Tuʻitavake	wing	26 September 1959	v Fiji at Suva
114	Samiuela Ula	fly-half	26 September 1959	v Fiji at Suva
115	Viliami Vakaʻuta	lock	26 September 1959	v Fiji at Suva
116	Kakalosi Kioa	(replacement)	26 September 1959	v Fiji at Suva
117	Lausiʻi Fililava	centre	21 May 1960	v New Zealand Maori at Nukuʻalofa
118	Uatesoni Palavi	fly-half	21 May 1960	v New Zealand Maori at Nukuʻalofa
119	Petelo Faʻapoi	wing	31 August 1963	v Fiji at Lautoka
120	Panuve Fakaʻua	centre	31 August 1963	v Fiji at Lautoka
121	Siaosi Selupe	lock	31 August 1963	v Fiji at Lautoka
122	Ngalumoetutula Kalaniuvalu	lock	10 September 1963	v Fiji at Suva
123	Foua Moala	lock	10 September 1963	v Fiji at Suva
124	Takai Sime	wing	10 September 1963	v Fiji at Suva
125	Tamataʻane Tatafu	wing	10 September 1963	v Fiji at Suva
126	Mr Fetuʻulele	lock	8 July 1967	v Fiji at Nukuʻalofa
127	Taniela Finau	prop	8 July 1967	v Fiji at Nukuʻalofa
128	Talitaufa Helu	scrum-half	8 July 1967	v Fiji at Nukuʻalofa
129	Kimpu Inoke	flanker	8 July 1967	v Fiji at Nukuʻalofa
130	Kei Iongi	wing	8 July 1967	v Fiji at Nukuʻalofa
131	Etuini Kelemeni	centre	8 July 1967	v Fiji at Nukuʻalofa
132	Tali Latukefu	centre	8 July 1967	v Fiji at Nukuʻalofa
133	Tevita Leger	flanker	8 July 1967	v Fiji at Nukuʻalofa
134	Tuilipe Mapa	fly-half	8 July 1967	v Fiji at Nukuʻalofa
135	Viliami Pahulu	hooker	8 July 1967	v Fiji at Nukuʻalofa
136	Samiuela Tatafu	fullback	8 July 1967	v Fiji at Nukuʻalofa
137	Kalani Hafoka	fullback	15 July 1967	v Fiji at Nukuʻalofa
138	Viliami Hosea	prop	15 July 1967	v Fiji at Nukuʻalofa
139	Sione Kava	flanker	15 July 1967	v Fiji at Nukuʻalofa
140	Sione Motuliki	lock	15 July 1967	v Fiji at Nukuʻalofa
141	Freddie Muller	scrum-half	15 July 1967	v Fiji at Nukuʻalofa
142	Viliami Alipate	no. 8	22 July 1967	v Fiji at Nukuʻalofa
143	Tali Kavapalu	fly-half	22 July 1967	v Fiji at Nukuʻalofa
144	George Selupe	lock	22 July 1967	v Fiji at Nukuʻalofa
145	Mr Telanisi	lock	22 July 1967	v Fiji at Nukuʻalofa
146	Supileo Fotu	flanker	17 August 1968	v Fiji at Suva
147	Fetuʻulele Mailangi	lock	17 August 1968	v Fiji at Suva
148	Sione Sika	centre	17 August 1968	v Fiji at Suva
149	Molou Filimoehala	(replacement)	7 September 1968	v Fiji at Suva
150	Taniela Tonga	(replacement)	7 September 1968	v Fiji at Suva
151	Sione Mafi	prop	16 August 1969	v New Zealand Maori at Christchurch
152	Sio Motuʻapuaka	lock	16 August 1969	v New Zealand Maori at Christchurch
153	Uhila Tai	fly-half	16 August 1969	v New Zealand Maori at Christchurch
154	Vainikolo Vanisi	wing	16 August 1969	v New Zealand Maori at Christchurch
155	Inoke Lupina	(replacement)	16 August 1969	v New Zealand Maori at Christchurch
156	Malakai Alatini	fly-half	6 September 1969	v New Zealand Maori at Auckland
157	Sami Latu	centre	15 July 1972	v Fiji at Nukuʻalofa
158	Taufuʻi Moala	wing	15 July 1972	v Fiji at Nukuʻalofa
159	Kulini Motuʻapuaka	prop	15 July 1972	v Fiji at Nukuʻalofa
160	Ilavalu Taufa	fullback	15 July 1972	v Fiji at Nukuʻalofa
161	Polutele Tuʻihalamaka	lock	15 July 1972	v Fiji at Nukuʻalofa
162	Fatai Kefu	centre	22 July 1972	v Fiji at Nukuʻalofa
163	Eukaliti Hehepoto	fly-half	5 August 1972	v Fiji at Nukuʻalofa
164	Tevita Bloomfield	hooker	22 May 1973	v New Zealand Maori at Nukuʻalofa
165	Haʻunga Fonua	scrum-half	22 May 1973	v New Zealand Maori at Nukuʻalofa
166	F. Hufanga		22 May 1973	v New Zealand Maori at Nukuʻalofa
167	Valita Maʻake	fullback	22 May 1973	v New Zealand Maori at Nukuʻalofa
168	Siope Matapule	winger	22 May 1973	v New Zealand Maori at Nukuʻalofa
169	Fakahau Valu	flanker	22 May 1973	v New Zealand Maori at Nukuʻalofa
170	Sione Foliaki	centre	23 June 1973	v Australia at Sydney
171	Pasifiki Tonga	prop	23 June 1973	v Australia at Sydney
172	Faʻaleo Tupi	lock	23 June 1973	v Australia at Sydney
173	Isikeli Vave	wing	23 June 1973	v Australia at Sydney
174	Tuli Kaho	(replacement)	23 June 1973	v Australia at Sydney
175	Ualeni Pahulu	prop	30 June 1973	v Australia at Brisbane
176	Sitafooti Aho	centre	28 September 1974	v Scotland XV at Murrayfield
177	Saia Fifita	prop	28 September 1974	v Scotland XV at Murrayfield
178	Talilotu Ngaluafe	wing	28 September 1974	v Scotland XV at Murrayfield
179	Tevita Pulumufita	hooker	28 September 1974	v Scotland XV at Murrayfield
180	Saimone Vaea	flanker	28 September 1974	v Scotland XV at Murrayfield
181	Hala Makaʻohi		25 October 1974	v Canada at Vancouver
182	Peni Kaihau	scrum-half	19 July 1975	v New Zealand Maori at New Plymouth
183	Sosaia Makalo	centre	19 July 1975	v New Zealand Maori at New Plymouth
184	Vainga Fakatulolo	prop	2 August 1975	v New Zealand Maori at Auckland
185	Sateki Tupou	scrum-half	2 August 1975	v New Zealand Maori at Auckland
186	Alele Vaihu	flanker	2 August 1975	v New Zealand Maori at Auckland
187	Niuselau Tofa Fakauho	centre	9 July 1977	v Fiji at Lautoka
188	Mana Hafoka	lock	9 July 1977	v Fiji at Lautoka
189	Pangia Katoa	hooker	9 July 1977	v Fiji at Lautoka
190	Peni Kiole	prop	9 July 1977	v Fiji at Lautoka
191	Pasuka Mapakaitolo	lock	9 July 1977	v Fiji at Lautoka
192	Viliami Moalaʻeua	wing	9 July 1977	v Fiji at Lautoka
193	Mosese Tuʻipulotu	wing	9 July 1977	v Fiji at Lautoka
194	Viliami Tuʻipulotu	no. 8	9 July 1977	v Fiji at Lautoka
195	Folafala Vuna	prop	9 July 1977	v Fiji at Lautoka
196	Nunu Vahe	(replacement)	9 July 1977	v Fiji at Lautoka
197	Sitani Halaʻufia	flanker	23 July 1977	v Fiji at Nadi
198	Sione Alatini	fly-half	30 July 1977	v Fiji at Suva
199	Satisi Vunipola	(replacement)	30 July 1977	v Fiji at Suva
200	Molitoni Finau	25 May 1979	v New Zealand Maori at Nukuʻalofa	
201	Rocky Fotu	wing	25 May 1979	v New Zealand Maori at Nukuʻalofa
202	Siai Liavaʻa	lock	25 May 1979	v New Zealand Maori at Nukuʻalofa
203	Peseti Maʻafu	scrum-half	25 May 1979	v New Zealand Maori at Nukuʻalofa
204	Tuʻipulotu Viliame	centre	25 May 1979	v New Zealand Maori at Nukuʻalofa
205	Ofa Hiko	prop	1 June 1979	v England XV at Nukuʻalofa
206	Alamoni Liavaʻa	centre	1 June 1979	v England XV at Nukuʻalofa
207	Prince Mailefihi	lock	1 June 1979	v England XV at Nukuʻalofa
208	Nofomuli Taumoefolau		1 June 1979	v England XV at Nukuʻalofa
209	Tuʻipulotu Maka		30 August 1979	v Samoa at Suva
210	M. Malu		30 August 1979	v Samoa at Suva
211	Malakai Pulumu		30 August 1979	v Samoa at Suva
212	Puniani Tuʻipulotu		30 August 1979	v Samoa at Suva
213	Mailefihi Tukuʻaho		30 August 1979	v Samoa at Suva
214	Soane Hola	lock	8 September 1979	v Fiji at Suva
215	Talanoa Kitekeiʻaho	wing	8 September 1979	v Fiji at Suva
216	Kulikefu Lomu	centre	8 September 1979	v Fiji at Suva
217	Soakai Motuʻapuaka	prop	8 September 1979	v Fiji at Suva
218	Semisi Faleafa	centre	3 June 1980	v Samoa at Apia
219	Foukimoana Maʻafu	wing	3 June 1980	v Samoa at Apia
220	Fili Moala	hooker	3 June 1980	v Samoa at Apia
221	Sione Vai	(centre)	3 June 1980	v Samoa at Apia
222	Sweet Leilani Fekau	fly-half	8 August 1981	v Fiji at Nukuʻalofa
223	Poseisei Havili	flanker	8 August 1981	v Fiji at Nukuʻalofa
224	Viliami Lutua	prop	8 August 1981	v Fiji at Nukuʻalofa
225	Sitini Mahe	lock	8 August 1981	v Fiji at Nukuʻalofa
226	Paea Moala	wing	8 August 1981	v Fiji at Nukuʻalofa
227	Soape Nuku	fullback	8 August 1981	v Fiji at Nukuʻalofa
228	Sisi Tuʻipulotu	(replacement)	8 August 1981	v Fiji at Nukuʻalofa
229	Pohahau Palu		8 August 1981	v Fiji at Nukuʻalofa
230	Siale Vai	centre	15 August 1981	v Fiji at Nukuʻalofa
231	Mr Sanilaita	(replacement)	15 August 1981	v Fiji at Nukuʻalofa
232	Amone Afu		1982	v Samoa at Nukuʻalofa
233	Tuʻikolovatu Halafihi		1982	v Samoa at Nukuʻalofa
234	Liapo Halavatau		1982	v Samoa at Nukuʻalofa
235	T. Kapeli		1982	v Samoa at Nukuʻalofa
236	Tomasi Lovo		1982	v Samoa at Nukuʻalofa
237	Feleti Moala		1982	v Samoa at Nukuʻalofa
238	Filimone Moala		1982	v Samoa at Nukuʻalofa
239	Pule Moala		1982	v Samoa at Nukuʻalofa
240	Tevita Soane		1982	v Samoa at Nukuʻalofa
241	Poese Taukolo		1982	v Samoa at Nukuʻalofa
242	Hakatoa Tupou		1982	v Samoa at Nukuʻalofa
243	Kapelilei Vunipola		1982	v Samoa at Nukuʻalofa
244	Mesui Fangaʻuta	wing	28 August 1982	v Fiji at Suva
245	Vatuniloka Fifita	no. 8	28 August 1982	v Fiji at Suva
246	Haʻunga Petelo	wing	28 August 1982	v Fiji at Suva
247	Feleti Taniela	centre	28 August 1982	v Fiji at Suva
248	Viliami Vunipola	centre	28 August 1982	v Fiji at Suva
249	Pau Afeaki		28 August 1982	v Fiji at Suva
250	Talai Fifita	scrum-half	28 August 1982	v Fiji at Suva
251	Viliami Maka		28 August 1982	v Fiji at Suva
252	Kouliti Maʻu		28 August 1982	v Fiji at Suva
253	Laukau Ofa		28 August 1982	v Fiji at Suva
254	Heneli Pauʻu		28 August 1982	v Fiji at Suva
255	Otenili Pifeleti		28 August 1982	v Fiji at Suva
256	Ofa Blake	prop	6 August 1983	v New Zealand Maori at Rotorua
257	Tohi Leha	lock	6 August 1983	v New Zealand Maori at Rotorua
258	Pauʻu Lolohea	flanker	6 August 1983	v New Zealand Maori at Rotorua
259	Tuʻihalafatai Maʻafu	wing	6 August 1983	v New Zealand Maori at Rotorua
260	Takai Makisi	no. 8	6 August 1983	v New Zealand Maori at Rotorua
261	Moʻunga Taufateau	fullback	6 August 1983	v New Zealand Maori at Rotorua
262	Paula Taholo	prop	13 August 1983	v New Zealand Maori at Auckland
263	Sinali Latu	no. 8	7 July 1984	v Fiji at Suva
264	Feao Lavemai	fly-half	7 July 1984	v Fiji at Suva
265	Sekona Taufa	wing	7 July 1984	v Fiji at Suva
266	Tali Eteʻaki	fullback	21 July 1984	v Fiji at Suva
267	Paula Tupou	flanker	21 July 1984	v Fiji at Suva
268	Laifaiʻi Kauhalaniua	(replacement)	21 July 1984	v Fiji at Suva
269	Peni Fakava	wing	5 June 1985	v Fiji at Apia
270	Manisela Hekeheke	flanker	5 June 1985	v Fiji at Apia
271	Fetaiaki Langi	flanker	5 June 1985	v Fiji at Apia
272	Pila Maka	lock	5 June 1985	v Fiji at Apia
273	Lui Stanley	wing	5 June 1985	v Fiji at Apia
274	Latu Vaʻeno	prop	5 June 1985	v Fiji at Apia
275	Lausii Hopoate	wing	12 June 1986	v Wales at Nukuʻalofa
276	Emosi Koloto	flanker	12 June 1986	v Wales at Nukuʻalofa
277	Funa Moala	prop	12 June 1986	v Wales at Nukuʻalofa
278	Samiu Mohi	wing	12 June 1986	v Wales at Nukuʻalofa
279	Mofuike Tuʻungafasi	lock	12 June 1986	v Wales at Nukuʻalofa
280	Vaivao Faʻaumu	centre	28 June 1986	v Fiji at Nukuʻalofa
281	Maliu Filise	no. 8	28 June 1986	v Fiji at Nukuʻalofa
282	Popolini Taʻunivao	flanker	28 June 1986	v Fiji at Nukuʻalofa
283	Totilini Tuavao	flanker	20 July 1986	v Fiji at Nukuʻalofa
284	Soane ʻAsi	wing	24 May 1987	v Canada at Napier
285	Quddus Fielea		24 May 1987	v Canada at Napier
286	Kasi Fine	lock	24 May 1987	v Canada at Napier
287	Kini Fotu	no. 8	24 May 1987	v Canada at Napier
288	Taipaleti Tuʻuta	flanker	24 May 1987	v Canada at Napier
289	Sione Tahaafe	(replacement)	24 May 1987	v Canada at Napier
290	Lemeki Vaipulu	(replacement)	24 May 1987	v Canada at Napier
291	Asa Amone	fly-half	29 May 1987	v Wales at Palmerston North
292	Manu Vunipola	wing	29 May 1987	v Wales at Palmerston North
293	Siaosi Atiola		1987	v Sam
294	Inoke Finau		1987	v Sam
295	Maimoa Havili		1987	v Sam
296	Teutau Lotoʻahea		1987	v Sam
297	Kite Tuivailala		1987	v Sam
298	Lopeti Uhatafe		1987	v Sam
299	Semi Veʻehala		1987	v Sam
300	Chris Manu		1987	v Sam
301	Liueli Fusimalohi	wing	29 August 1987	v Fiji at Suva
302	Tevita Hafoka	lock	29 August 1987	v Fiji at Suva
303	Kolona Latu	lock	29 August 1987	v Fiji at Suva
304	Faʻonelua Fakaua		1988	v Sam
305	Kuli Faletau		1988	v Sam
306	Fatai Ika		1988	v Sam
307	Maliepo Toma		1988	v Sam
308	Soane Finau	hooker	31 May 1988	v Fiji at Apia
309	Taitusi Halasika	hooker	31 May 1988	v Fiji at Apia
310	Sione Palenapa		31 May 1988	v Fiji at Apia
311	Hikifoʻou Vaingolo	centre	31 May 1988	v Fiji at Apia
312	Asisi Pouʻuhila	centre	2 July 1988	v Fiji at Nukuʻalofa
313	Takitoa Taumoepeau	wing	2 July 1988	v Fiji at Nukuʻalofa
314	Koloni Tuivailala	lock	2 July 1988	v Fiji at Nukuʻalofa
315	Feʻao Vunipola	prop	2 July 1988	v Fiji at Nukuʻalofa
316	Koliniata Feke	(replacement)	2 July 1988	v Fiji at Nukuʻalofa
317	Samiu Mafi	fullback	8 October 1988	v Fiji at Nadi
318	Tinitale Makalea	prop	8 October 1988	v Fiji at Nadi
319	Liueli Susimalofi	centre	15 July 1989	v Fiji at Suva
320	Moimoi Halatanu	fullback	22 July 1989	v Fiji at Nukuʻalofa
321	Feao Filikitonga	hooker	24 March 1990	v Fiji at Nukuʻalofa
322	Isi Tapueluelu		24 March 1990	v Fiji at Nukuʻalofa
323	Ikani Taufa	lock	24 March 1990	v Fiji at Nukuʻalofa
324	Nafe Tufui	scrum half	24 March 1990	v Fiji at Nukuʻalofa
325	Elisi Vunipola	fly-half	24 March 1990	v Fiji at Nukuʻalofa
326	Tevita Lavaki	prop	8 April 1990	v Japan at Tokyo
327	Amanaki Vahaʻakolo	centre	8 April 1990	v Japan at Tokyo
328	Fololisi Masila	(replacement)	8 April 1990	v Japan at Tokyo
329	Peniola Ahofono		11 April 1990	v Samoa at Tokyo
330	Vaea Anitoni		11 April 1990	v Samoa at Tokyo
331	Feleti Faotusa		11 April 1990	v Samoa at Tokyo
332	Takau Lutua		15 April 1990	v Korea at Tokyo
333	Uafe Niuila		1990	v Sam
334	Sitiveni Pongi		1990	v Sam
335	Tukua Tonga		1990	v Sam
336	Fifita Faletau	prop	1990	v Sam
337	Lehaʻuli Fotu		28 May 1991	v Samoa at Nukuʻalofa
338	Okalani Kanatea		28 May 1991	v Samoa at Nukuʻalofa
339	Lopeti Samiu	prop	28 May 1991	v Samoa at Nukuʻalofa
340	Sione Vaeno		28 May 1991	v Samoa at Nukuʻalofa
341	Tevita Vaʻenuku		28 May 1991	v Samoa at Nukuʻalofa
342	Soane Hiko	fullback	8 June 1991	v Fiji at Suva
343	Alatini Saulala	centre	8 June 1991	v Fiji at Suva
344	Fatui Lagilagi	prop	11 June 1991	v Fiji at Suva
345	Huihahau Nisa	fly-half	11 June 1991	v Fiji at Suva
346	Semi Taupeaafe	wing	11 June 1991	v Fiji at Suva
347	Pelimani Fisiʻiahi	lock	1992	v Sam
348	Rudi Kapeli		1992	v Sam
349	Dave Latailakepa		1992	v Sam
350	Holani Pohiva	no. 8	1992	v Sam
351	Chris Schaumkel		1992	v Sam
352	Isi Tuʻivai		29 May 1993	v Samoa at Nukuʻalofa
353	Mistana Vea	wing	25 July 1992	v Fiji at Nukuʻalofa
354	Tasi Vikilani	flanker	25 July 1992	v Fiji at Nukuʻalofa
355	Isi Fatani	lock	25 July 1992	v Fiji at Nukuʻalofa
356	Siaosi Latu	prop	25 July 1992	v Fiji at Nukuʻalofa
357	Tevita Pauʻu	wing	25 July 1992	v Fiji at Nukuʻalofa
358	Tavake Tuineau	centre	25 July 1992	v Fiji at Nukuʻalofa
359	Ipolito Fenukitau		29 May 1993	v Samoa at Nukuʻalofa
360	Samisoni Lolo		29 May 1993	v Samoa at Nukuʻalofa
361	Feleti Mahoni		29 May 1993	v Samoa at Nukuʻalofa
362	Valita Moa		29 May 1993	v Samoa at Nukuʻalofa
363	Etuini Talakai		29 May 1993	v Samoa at Nukuʻalofa
364	Pauliasi Vakamalolo		29 May 1993	v Samoa at Nukuʻalofa
365	Martin Manukia		29 May 1993	v Samoa at Nukuʻalofa
366	Feleti Fakaongo	flanker	5 June 1993	v Scotland XV at Nukuʻalofa
367	Manu Lavaka	centre	5 June 1993	v Scotland XV at Nukuʻalofa
368	A. Tulikaki	scrum-half	5 June 1993	v Scotland XV at Nukuʻalofa
369	Afu Uasi	wing	5 June 1993	v Scotland XV at Nukuʻalofa
370	Finau Maʻafu	(replacement)	12 June 1993	v Fiji at Suva
371	Semisi Tongia	(replacement)	12 June 1993	v Fiji at Suva
372	Falamani Mafi	lock	4 July 1993	v Australia at Brisbane
373	Alasika Taufa	wing	4 July 1993	v Australia at Brisbane
374	Taipe Vave	fullback	4 July 1993	v Australia at Brisbane
375	Tuʻihakavalu Kolo	(replacement)	4 July 1993	v Australia at Brisbane
376	Falanisi Manukia	(replacement)	4 July 1993	v Australia at Brisbane
377	Tuʻakalau Fukofuka	prop	17 July 1993	v Fiji at Nukuʻalofa
378	Sateki Tuipulotu	fullback	17 July 1993	v Fiji at Nukuʻalofa
379	Sam Alatini		4 June 1994	v Samoa at Moamoa
380	Unaloto Fa		4 June 1994	v Samoa at Moamoa
381	Valai Taumoepeau		4 June 1994	v Samoa at Moamoa
382	Penieli Latu	centre	22 June 1994	v Wales at Nukuʻalofa
383	Kati Tuipulotu	flanker	22 June 1994	v Wales at Nukuʻalofa
384	Kilioni Tuipulotu	no. 8	9 July 1994	v Fiji at Nukuʻalofa
385	Jonathan Tupou	prop	9 July 1994	v Fiji at Nukuʻalofa
386	Pouvalu Latukefu	lock	11 February 1995	v Japan at Nagoya
387	David Manako	centre	11 February 1995	v Japan at Nagoya
388	Mana Otai	flanker	11 February 1995	v Japan at Nagoya
389	Taholo Anitoni	(replacement)	19 February 1995	v Japan at Tokyo
390	Vaʻa Toloke	(replacement)	19 February 1995	v Japan at Tokyo
391	Saili Feʻao	prop	26 May 1995	v France at Pretoria
392	Willie Losʻe	lock	26 May 1995	v France at Pretoria
393	Unuoi Vaʻenuku	centre	26 May 1995	v France at Pretoria
394	Inoke Afeaki	(replacement)	26 May 1995	v France at Pretoria
395	Simana Mafileo	centre	3 June 1995	v Côte d'Ivoire at Rustenberg
396	Taipe ʻIsitolo	(replacement)	3 June 1995	v Côte d'Ivoire at Rustenberg
397	Akuila Mafi	(replacement)	3 June 1995	v Côte d'Ivoire at Rustenberg
398	Fitz Takeifanga	centre	28 June 1995	v Samoa at Nukuʻalofa
399	Pita Tanginoa	wing	28 June 1995	v Samoa at Nukualofa
400	Paula Tuitavake	(replacement)	15 July 1995	v Fiji at Suva
401	Tevita Asi		13 July 1996	v Samoa at Apia
402	Paula Kalanivalu		13 July 1996	v Samoa at Apia
403	Lani Katoa		13 July 1996	v Samoa at Apia
404	Heamani Lavaka		13 July 1996	v Samoa at Apia
405	Etuate Manu		13 July 1996	v Samoa at Apia
406	Ngalu Tau		13 July 1996	v Samoa at Apia
407	Josh Taumalolo		13 July 1996	v Samoa at Apia
408	Maikolo Kaihea	hooker	27 July 1996	v Fiji at Nukuʻalofa
409	Fepikou Tatafu	centre	27 July 1996	v Fiji at Nukuʻalofa
410	Gustavo Tonga	fullback	27 July 1996	v Fiji at Nukuʻalofa
411	Semisi Fakaʻosifolau		17 May 1997	v Zimbabwe at Harare
412	Latiume Maka		17 May 1997	v Zimbabwe at Harare
413	Viliami Uhi		17 May 1997	v Zimbabwe at Harare
414	Maama Molitika	flanker	24 May 1997	v Namibia at Windhoek
415	Damien Penisini	prop	24 May 1997	v Namibia at Windhoek
416	Taunaholo Siale	hooker	24 May 1997	v Namibia at Windhoek
417	Alipate Taʻufoʻou	lock	24 May 1997	v Namibia at Windhoek
418	Talanoa Tohi	flanker	24 May 1997	v Namibia at Windhoek
419	Semi Tulikifanga	(replacement)	10 June 1997	v South Africa at Cape Town
420	Dave Tiueti	wing	21 June 1997	v Fiji at Suva
421	Vikilani Afeaki		28 June 1997	v Samoa at Apia
422	Johnny Ngauamo	centre	5 July 1997	v Cook Islands at Nukuʻalofa
423	David Briggs	prop	16 November 1997	v Wales at Swansea
424	Usaia Latu	lock	16 November 1997	v Wales at Swansea
425	Viliami Maʻasi	hooker	16 November 1997	v Wales at Swansea
426	Tom Matakiongo	flanker	16 November 1997	v Wales at Swansea
427	Sione Tuʻipulotu	scrum-half	16 November 1997	v Wales at Swansea
428	Simon Hafoka	(replacement)	16 November 1997	v Wales at Swansea
429	Sione Tai	(replacement)	16 November 1997	v Wales at Swansea
430	Salesi Finau	centre	18 September 1998	v Samoa at Sydney
431	Pierre Hola	fullback	18 September 1998	v Samoa at Sydney
432	Benhur Kivalu	lock	18 September 1998	v Samoa at Sydney
433	Jonathan Koloi	flanker	18 September 1998	v Samoa at Sydney
434	Taunaholo Taufahema	wing	18 September 1998	v Samoa at Sydney
435	Brian Woolley	fly-half	18 September 1998	v Samoa at Sydney
436	Hainga Fakatou	(replacement)	18 September 1998	v Samoa at Sydney
437	Uiniati Moa	(replacement)	18 September 1998	v Samoa at Sydney
438	Maʻafu Pale	hooker	22 September 1998	v Australia at Canberra
439	Matt Te Pou	flanker	22 September 1998	v Australia at Canberra
440	David Edwards	(replacement)	22 September 1998	v Australia at Canberra
441	Sililo Martens	(replacement)	22 September 1998	v Australia at Canberra
442	Jeff Sitoa	(replacement)	22 September 1998	v Australia at Canberra
443	Sam Hala	wing	6 March 1999	v Georgia at Nukuʻalofa
444	Fifitapuku Faletau	prop	28 March 1999	v Georgia at Tbilisi
445	Aleki Lutui	(replacement)	28 March 1999	v Georgia at Tbilisi
446	Tevita Taumoepeau	(replacement)	16 April 1999	v Korea at Nukuʻalofa
447	Sengili Tuihalamaka	(replacement)	16 April 1999	v Korea at Nukuʻalofa
448	Kenni Fisilau	(replacement)	8 May 1999	v Japan at Tokyo
449	Kisione Ahotaʻeiloa	flanker	5 June 1999	v Samoa at Apia
450	Taʻu Faingaʻanuku	prop	5 June 1999	v Samoa at Apia
451	Epi Taione	wing	10 October 1999	v Italy at Leicester
452	Hotili Asi	prop	20 May 2000	v Canada at Vancouver
453	Chris Halaʻufia	flanker	20 May 2000	v Canada at Vancouver
454	Aisea Havili	wing	20 May 2000	v Canada at Vancouver
455	Apai Kaituʻu	no. 8	20 May 2000	v Canada at Vancouver
456	Epafasi Taʻufoʻou	centre	20 May 2000	v Canada at Vancouver
457	Lotu Filipine	(replacement)	20 May 2000	v Canada at Vancouver
458	Fakataha Molitika	(replacement)	20 May 2000	v Canada at Vancouver
459	Sioeli Nau	(replacement)	20 May 2000	v Canada at Vancouver
460	Movete Otoʻota	(replacement)	20 May 2000	v Canada at Vancouver
461	Solomone Matangi	wing	3 June 2000	v Japan at Tokyo
462	Soane Havea	scrum-half	16 June 2000	v New Zealand at North Shore City
463	Henry Saafi	flanker	16 June 2000	v New Zealand at North Shore City
464	Loni Manako	(replacement)	16 June 2000	v New Zealand at North Shore City
465	Tevita Fifita	flanker	25 May 2001	v Fiji at Nukuʻalofa
466	Nisifolo Naufahu	lock	25 May 2001	v Fiji at Nukuʻalofa
467	Manako Tonga	no. 8	25 May 2001	v Fiji at Nukuʻalofa
468	Viliami Vaki	lock	25 May 2001	v Fiji at Nukuʻalofa
469	Taufaʻao Filise	(replacement)	25 May 2001	v Fiji at Nukuʻalofa
470	Gus Leger	centre	10 November 2001	v Scotland at Murrayfield
471	John Pale	prop	10 November 2001	v Scotland at Murrayfield
472	Toni Alatini	(replacement)	10 November 2001	v Scotland at Murrayfield
473	Tukulua Lokotui	(replacement)	17 November 2001	v Wales at Millennium Stadium
474	Salesi Moimoi	(replacement)	17 November 2001	v Wales at Millennium Stadium
475	Moʻunga Kafatolu	fullback	25 May 2002	v Japan at Kumagaya
476	Andrew Maʻilei	centre	25 May 2002	v Japan at Kumagaya
477	Stanley Afeaki	flanker	7 June 2002	v Fiji at Nukuʻalofa
478	Nick Hau	(replacement)	7 June 2002	v Fiji at Nukuʻalofa
479	Sione Fonua	wing	15 June 2002	v Samoa at Nukuʻalofa
480	Emosi Kauhenga	(replacement)	15 June 2002	v Samoa at Nukuʻalofa
481	Laukau Lile	(replacement)	15 June 2002	v Samoa at Nukuʻalofa
482	Kisi Pulu	(replacement)	6 July 2002	v Fiji at Nadi
483	Kilioni Bakewa	wing	30 November 2002	v Papua New Guinea at Port Moresby
484	Tonga Leaʻaetoa	prop	30 November 2002	v Papua New Guinea at Port Moresby
485	Milton Ngauamo	lock	30 November 2002	v Papua New Guinea at Port Moresby
486	David Palu	scrum-half	30 November 2002	v Papua New Guinea at Port Moresby
487	John Payne	centre	30 November 2002	v Papua New Guinea at Port Moresby
488	Ephraim Taukafa	hooker	30 November 2002	v Papua New Guinea at Port Moresby
489	Lisiate Ulufonua	fly-half	30 November 2002	v Papua New Guinea at Port Moresby
490	Willie Gibbons	(replacement)	30 November 2002	v Papua New Guinea at Port Moresby
491	Taniela Tulia	wing	15 March 2003	v Korea at Seoul
492	Feki Latusalu	(replacement)	15 March 2003	v Korea at Seoul
493	Tevita Tuʻifua	wing	4 July 2003	v Fiji at Nadi
494	Sione Tuʻamoheloa	(replacement)	4 July 2003	v Fiji at Nadi
495	Suka Hufanga	centre	11 July 2003	v Fiji at Nukuʻalofa
496	Kafalosi Tonga	prop	11 July 2003	v Fiji at Nukuʻalofa
497	Sila Vaʻenuku	wing	11 July 2003	v Fiji at Nukuʻalofa
498	Edward Langi	(replacement)	24 October 2003	v New Zealand at Brisbane
499	Pila Fifita	wing	29 October 2003	v Canada at Wollongong
500	Fangatapu Apikotoa		29 May 2004	v Samoa at Apia
501	Lisiate Faʻaoso		29 May 2004	v Samoa at Apia
502	Seti Filo		29 May 2004	v Samoa at Apia
503	Ofa Misa		29 May 2004	v Samoa at Apia
504	Mosese Moala		29 May 2004	v Samoa at Apia
505	Sefa Vaka		29 May 2004	v Samoa at Apia
506	Sikuti Vunipola		29 May 2004	v Samoa at Apia
507	Seti Kiole	wing	25 June 2005	v Fiji at Suva
508	Mosese Makasini	lock	25 June 2005	v Fiji at Suva
509	Matini Tupou	no. 8	25 June 2005	v Fiji at Suva
510	Siaosi Taufa	(replacement)	25 June 2005	v Fiji at Suva
511	Hudson Tongaʻuiha	(replacement)	25 June 2005	v Fiji at Suva
512	Samuela Fakava		2 July 2005	v Samoa at Apia
513	Ueleni Fono	no. 8	2 July 2005	v Samoa at Apia
514	Siope Kapeli	flanker	2 July 2005	v Samoa at Apia
515	Samuela Lisala	wing	2 July 2005	v Samoa at Apia
516	Sione Niu Tonga	(replacement)	2 July 2005	v Samoa at Apia
517	Sione Masima	centre	16 July 2005	v Fiji at Nukuʻalofa
518	Rodney Mahe	(replacement)	22 July 2005	v Samoa at Nukuʻalofa
519	Fotuʻaika Naitoko	(replacement)	22 July 2005	v Samoa at Nukuʻalofa
520	Sione Taukapo	(replacement)	22 July 2005	v Samoa at Nukuʻalofa
521	Soane Tongaʻuiha	prop	12 November 2005	v Italy at Prato
522	Peni Fakalelu	(replacement)	12 November 2005	v Italy at Prato
523	Alani Maka	(replacement)	19 November 2005	v France at Toulouse
524	Talite Vaioleti	(replacement)	19 November 2005	v France at Toulouse
525	Paino Hehea	lock	4 June 2006	v Japan at Fukuoka
526	Nili Latu Langilangi	flanker	4 June 2006	v Japan at Fukuoka
527	Tatafu Naʻaniumotu	centre	4 June 2006	v Japan at Fukuoka
528	Tevita Vaikona	wing	4 June 2006	v Japan at Fukuoka
529	Viliami Hakalo	(replacement)	4 June 2006	v Japan at Fukuoka
530	Isileli Tupou	(replacement)	24 June 2006	v Cook Islands at Rarotonga
531	Isieli Fine	lock	10 February 2007	v Korea at Henderson
532	Tevita Fonua	prop	10 February 2007	v Korea at Henderson
533	Teuʻimuli Kaufusi	lock	10 February 2007	v Korea at Henderson
534	Vunga Lilo	fullback	10 February 2007	v Korea at Henderson
535	Sione Poteki	hooker	10 February 2007	v Korea at Henderson
536	Vaea Poteki	wing	10 February 2007	v Korea at Henderson
537	Toma Toke	prop	10 February 2007	v Korea at Henderson
538	Hale T-Pole	no. 8	10 February 2007	v Korea at Henderson
539	Atonio Halangahu	(replacement)	10 February 2007	v Korea at Henderson
540	Sione Kalamafoni	(replacement)	10 February 2007	v Korea at Henderson
541	Heamani Paea	(replacement)	10 February 2007	v Korea at Henderson
542	Folauhola Tautauʻa	(replacement)	10 February 2007	v Korea at Henderson
543	Makoni Finau	(replacement)	25 May 2007	v Australia A at Sydney
544	Tevita Ahoafi	(replacement)	25 May 2007	v Australia A at Sydney
545	Setaleki Luʻau	(replacement)	25 May 2007	v Australia A at Sydney
546	Sateki Mataʻu	(replacement)	25 May 2007	v Australia A at Sydney
547	Naisa Sikalu	(replacement)	25 May 2007	v Australia A at Sydney
548	Tevita Tanginoa	lock	25 May 2007	v Australia A at Sydney
549	Samiu Vahafolau	no. 8	2 June 2007	v Japan at Coffs Harbour
550	Lisiate Tafa	(replacement)	2 June 2007	v Japan at Coffs Harbour
551	Patrick Tamoua	(replacement)	2 June 2007	v Japan at Coffs Harbour
552	Lopeti Lolohea	(fullback)	9 June 2007	v Junior ABs at Nukuʻalofa
553	Mesui Lemoto	fullback	16 June 2007	v Fiji at Lautoka
554	Finau Maka	no. 8	12 September 2007	v United States of America at Montpellier
555	Enele Taufa	scrum-half	16 September 2007	v Samoa at Montpellier
556	Josh Afu	lock	15 June 2008	v Japan at Sendai
557	Sione Lavaka	wing	15 June 2008	v Japan at Sendai
558	Tupou Palu	wing	15 June 2008	v Japan at Sendai
559	Semisi Telefoni	prop	15 June 2008	v Japan at Sendai
560	Samuela Ika	(replacement)	15 June 2008	v Japan at Sendai
561	Sione Timani	(replacement)	15 June 2008	v Japan at Sendai
562	Semosoni Pone	wing	28 June 2008	v Samoa at Nukuʻalofa
563	Alipate Fatafehi	wing	13 June 2009	v Fiji at Nukuʻalofa
564	David Tevita Halaifonua	wing	13 June 2009	v Fiji at Nukuʻalofa
565	Ilaisa Maʻasi	hooker	13 June 2009	v Fiji at Nukuʻalofa
566	Poʻaloʻi Taula	prop	13 June 2009	v Fiji at Nukuʻalofa
567	Opeti Fonua	(no. 8)	13 June 2009	v Fiji at Nukuʻalofa
568	Pasuka Mapakaitolo	(lock)	13 June 2009	v Fiji at Nukuʻalofa
569	Mateo Malupo	wing	23 June 2009	v Samoa at Lautoka
570	Mahe Fangupo	(scrum-half)	23 June 2009	v Samoa at Lautoka
571	Fou-Ki-Moana Katoa	(flanker)	27 June 2009	v Japan at Lautoka
572	Siosaia Palei	(scrum-half)	27 June 2009	v Japan at Lautoka
573	Kilifi Fangupo	scrum-half	28 November 2009	v Portugal at Lisbon
574	Paula Kata	flanker	28 November 2009	v Portugal at Lisbon
575	Etueni Siua	wing	28 November 2009	v Portugal at Lisbon
576	Sione Vaiomoʻunga	hooker	28 November 2009	v Portugal at Lisbon
577	Mani Vakaloa	wing	28 November 2009	v Portugal at Lisbon
578	Kurt Morath	(replacement)	28 November 2009	v Portugal at Lisbon
579	Manu Ahotaʻeʻiloa	winger	12 June 2010	v Samoa at Apia
580	Akameta Feʻao	lock	12 June 2010	v Samoa at Apia
581	Saia Fekitoa	centre	12 June 2010	v Samoa at Apia
582	Kelepi Halafihi	flanker	12 June 2010	v Samoa at Apia
583	Daniel Morath	scrum-half	12 June 2010	v Samoa at Apia
584	Alepini Olosoni	lock	12 June 2010	v Samoa at Apia
585	Alaska Taufa	winger	12 June 2010	v Samoa at Apia
586	Samisoni Fisilau	(scrum-half)	12 June 2010	v Samoa at Apia
587	Sione Fukofuka	(prop)	12 June 2010	v Samoa at Apia
588	Steve Mafi	(lock)	12 June 2010	v Samoa at Apia
589	William Helu	winger	19 June 2010	v Fiji at Apia
590	Haani Halaeua	(flanker)	19 June 2010	v Fiji at Apia
591	Viliami Pola	(prop)	19 June 2010	v Fiji at Apia
592	Aloisio Mailangi	(flanker)	26 June 2010	v Japan at Apia
593	Damien Fakafanu	centre	29 September 2010	v Chile at Santiago
594	Taumei Hikila	lock	29 September 2010	v Chile at Santiago
595	Rutikha Ilolahia	flanker	29 September 2010	v Chile at Santiago
596	Petuliki Mateo	centre	29 September 2010	v Chile at Santiago
597	Kama Sakalia	hooker	29 September 2010	v Chile at Santiago
598	Paea Siulangapo	lock	29 September 2010	v Chile at Santiago
599	Michael Toloke	winger	29 September 2010	v Chile at Santiago
600	Sione Vaioleti	flanker	29 September 2010	v Chile at Santiago
601	Sioeli Faupula	(prop)	29 September 2010	v Chile at Santiago
602	Kuea Kolokihakaufiji	(flanker)	29 September 2010	v Chile at Santiago
603	Viliame Iongi	winger	8 June 2011	v USA at Esher
604	Pepa Koloamatangi	flanker	8 June 2011	v USA at Esher
605	Viliami Maʻafu	no. 8	8 June 2011	v USA at Esher
606	Ofa Faingaʻanuku	(prop)	8 June 2011	v USA at Esher
607	Paula Kaho	(no. 8)	8 June 2011	v USA at Esher
608	Eddie Paea	(hooker)	8 June 2011	v USA at Esher
609	Silivenusi Taumoepeau	(centre)	8 June 2011	v USA at Esher
610	Sona Taumalolo	prop	2 July 2011	v Fiji at Lautoka
611	Joe Tuineau	(flanker)	2 July 2011	v Fiji at Lautoka
612	Tevita Ula	(flanker)	2 July 2011	v Fiji at Lautoka
613	Sila Puafisi	prop	9 July 2011	v Japan at Suva
614	Maleko Latu	(prop)	9 July 2011	v Japan at Suva
615	Tomasi Palu	(fly-half)	13 July 2011	v Samoa at Lautoka
616	Halani Aulika	prop	13 August 2011	v Fiji at Lautoka
617	Taniela Moa	scrum-half	13 August 2011	v Fiji at Lautoka
618	Fetuʻu Vainikolo	winger	13 August 2011	v Fiji at Lautoka
619	Siale Piutau	(centre)	13 August 2011	v Fiji at Lautoka
620	Mafileo Kefu	centre	5 June 2012	v Samoa at Nagoya
621	Vili Faingaʻa	(flanker)	5 June 2012	v Samoa at Nagoya
622	Tevita Mailau	(prop)	5 June 2012	v Samoa at Nagoya
623	Sione Piukala	centre	10 November 2012	v Italy at Brescia
624	Elvis Taione	hooker	10 November 2012	v Italy at Brescia
625	Eddie Aholelei	prop	25 May 2013	v Japan at Kanagawa
626	Taione Vea	prop	25 May 2013	v Japan at Kanagawa
627	Viliami Fihaki	(no. 8)	25 May 2013	v Japan at Kanagawa
628	Samisone Masima	(lock)	25 May 2013	v Japan at Kanagawa
629	Fraser Anderson	centre	14 June 2013	v USA at Carson
630	Siale Fahiua	(fly-half)	14 June 2013	v USA at Carson
631	Daniel Faleafa	(no. 8)	14 June 2013	v USA at Carson
632	Rocky Havili	(winger)	23 June 2013	v Fiji at Tokyo
633	Uili Koloʻofai	lock	9 November 2013	v Romania at Bucharest
634	Latiume Fosita	(fly-half)	9 November 2013	v Romania at Bucharest
635	Suliasi Taufalele	(hooker)	9 November 2013	v Romania at Bucharest
636	Mataʻali Paea	centre	22 November 2013	v Wales at Millennium Stadium
637	Otulea Katoa	winger	7 June 2014	v Samoa at Apia
638	Paul Ngauamo	(hooker)	7 June 2014	v Samoa at Apia
639	Sonatane Takulua	(scrum-half)	7 June 2014	v Samoa at Apia
640	Paea Faʻanunu	(prop)	8 November 2014	v Georgia at Tbilisi
641	Siua Halanukonuka	(prop)	8 November 2014	v Georgia at Tbilisi
642	Sione Lea	(prop)	15 November 2014	v USA at Gloucester
643	Telusa Veainu	winger	18 July 2015	v Fiji at Suva
644	Viliami Tahituʻa	centre	24 July 2015	v Canada at Vancouver
645	Sosefo Sakalia	(hooker)	24 July 2015	v Canada at Vancouver
646	Jack Ram	flanker	29 July 2015	v USA at Toronto
647	Sosefo Maʻake	(scrum-half)	29 July 2015	v USA at Toronto
648	Sione Faletau	prop	11 June 2016	v Fiji at Suva
649	Daniel Kilioni	winger	11 June 2016	v Fiji at Suva
650	Nafi Tuitavake	centre	11 June 2016	v Fiji at Suva
651	Sione Angaʻaelangi	(hooker)	11 June 2016	v Fiji at Suva
652	Kali Hala	(centre)	11 June 2016	v Fiji at Suva
653	ʻApakuki Maʻafu	(centre)	11 June 2016	v Fiji at Suva
654	Fusi Malimali	(prop)	11 June 2016	v Fiji at Suva
655	Sione Tau	(no. 8)	11 June 2016	v Fiji at Suva
656	Wayne Ngaluafe	(scrum-half)	18 June 2016	v Georgia at Suva
657	Martin Naufahu	fly-half	25 June 2016	v Samoa at Apia
658	Tevita Koloamatangi	no. 8	12 November 2016	v Spain at Madrid
659	Kotoni Ale	(flanker)	12 November 2016	v Spain at Madrid
660	Valentino Mapapalangi	(no. 8)	12 November 2016	v Spain at Madrid
661	Fetuli Paea	(replacement)	12 November 2016	v Spain at Madrid
662	Cooper Vuna	(fullback)	26 November 2016	v Italy at Padova
663	Leva Fifita	lock	16 June 2017	v Wales at Auckland
664	Latu Talakai	prop	16 June 2017	v Wales at Auckland
665	Ben Tameifuna	prop	16 June 2017	v Wales at Auckland
666	Mike Faleafa	(flanker)	16 June 2017	v Wales at Auckland
667	Leon Fukofuka	(scrum-half)	16 June 2017	v Wales at Auckland
668	Phil Kite	(prop)	16 June 2017	v Wales at Auckland
669	Kiti Taimani Vaini	(winger)	16 June 2017	v Wales at Auckland
670	Siegfried Fisiʻihoi	prop	1 July 2017	v Samoa at Nukuʻalofa
671	Atieli Pakalani	fullback	1 July 2017	v Samoa at Nukuʻalofa
672	Tevita Taufuʻi	(winger)	1 July 2017	v Samoa at Nukuʻalofa
673	Fotu Lokotui	flanker	18 November 2017	v Japan at Toulouse
674	Maama Vaipulu	no. 8	18 November 2017	v Japan at Toulouse
675	Jethro Felemi	(prop)	18 November 2017	v Japan at Toulouse
676	Onehunga Havili	(flanker)	18 November 2017	v Japan at Toulouse
677	Penikolo Latu	(winger)	18 November 2017	v Japan at Toulouse
678	Sione Lolohea	(hooker)	18 November 2017	v Japan at Toulouse
679	George Taina	(fly-half)	18 November 2017	v Japan at Toulouse
680	Suke Tuumotooa	(scrum-half)	18 November 2017	v Japan at Toulouse
681	Sione Vailanu	(lock)	18 November 2017	v Japan at Toulouse
682	Leo Halavatau	(prop)	25 November 2017	v Romania at Bucharest
683	Sione Fifita	fullback	9 June 2018	v Georgia at Suva
684	Dave Lolohea	prop	9 June 2018	v Georgia at Suva
685	Nasi Manu	no. 8	9 June 2018	v Georgia at Suva
686	David Feao	(prop)	9 June 2018	v Georgia at Suva
687	Viliami Lolohea	(winger)	9 June 2018	v Georgia at Suva
688	Maʻafu Fia	prop	17 November 2018	v Wales at Millennium Stadium
689	Zane Kapeli	no. 8	24 November 2018	v Georgia at Tbilisi
690	Latu Vaeno	centre	24 November 2018	v Georgia at Tbilisi
691	Tolu Fahamokioa	(prop)	24 November 2018	v Georgia at Tbilisi
692	James Faiva	fly-half	27 July 2019	v Samoa at Apia
693	Mali Hingano	centre	27 July 2019	v Samoa at Apia
694	Sam Lousi	lock	27 July 2019	v Samoa at Apia
695	Otumaka Mausia	(winger)	27 July 2019	v Samoa at Apia
696	Toma Taufa	(prop)	27 July 2019	v Samoa at Apia
697	Vunipola Fifita	(prop)	31 August 2019	v Fiji at Auckland
698	Siua Maile	hooker	7 September 2019	v New Zealand at Hamilton
699	Nikolai Foliaki	centre	3 July 2021	v New Zealand at Auckland
700	Solomone Funaki	flanker	3 July 2021	v New Zealand at Auckland
701	Fine Inisi	centre	3 July 2021	v New Zealand at Auckland
702	Mateaki Kafatolu	flanker	3 July 2021	v New Zealand at Auckland
703	Don Lolo	lock	3 July 2021	v New Zealand at Auckland
704	Sam Moli	hooker	3 July 2021	v New Zealand at Auckland
705	Duke Nginingini	prop	3 July 2021	v New Zealand at Auckland
706	Hosea Saumaki	winger	3 July 2021	v New Zealand at Auckland
707	Sione Tuipulotu	no. 8	3 July 2021	v New Zealand at Auckland
708	Walter Fifita	(fullback)	3 July 2021	v New Zealand at Auckland
709	Lua Li	(prop)	3 July 2021	v New Zealand at Auckland
710	Harrison Mataele	(lock)	3 July 2021	v New Zealand at Auckland
711	Viliami Taulani	(flanker)	3 July 2021	v New Zealand at Auckland
712	Viliami Fine	(winger)	10 July 2021	v Samoa at Auckland
713	Sam Vaka	(fullback)	10 July 2021	v Samoa at Auckland
714	Jay Fonokalafi	(hooker)	17 July 2021	v Samoa at Hamilton
715	Aisea Halo	(scrum-half)	17 July 2021	v Samoa at Hamilton
716	Kelemete Finau-Fetuli	flanker	24 July 2021	v Cook Islands at Pukekohe
717	Semisi Paea	lock	24 July 2021	v Cook Islands at Pukekohe
718	Tovo Faleafa	(flanker)	24 July 2021	v Cook Islands at Pukekohe
719	Paula Mahe	(centre)	24 July 2021	v Cook Islands at Pukekohe
720	Nela Matakaiongo	(no. 8)	24 July 2021	v Cook Islands at Pukekohe
721	John Tapueluelu	(fullback)	24 July 2021	v Cook Islands at Pukekohe
722	Setefano Funaki	lock	30 October 2021	v Scotland at Murrayfield
723	Tanginoa Halaifonua	flanker	30 October 2021	v Scotland at Murrayfield
724	Atu Manu	winger	30 October 2021	v Scotland at Murrayfield
725	Maile Ngauamo	hooker	30 October 2021	v Scotland at Murrayfield
726	Vaea Tutuila Vaea	centre	30 October 2021	v Scotland at Murrayfield
727	Loni Uhila	prop	30 October 2021	v Scotland at Murrayfield
728	Navarre Haisila	(fly-half)	30 October 2021	v Scotland at Murrayfield
729	Solomone Kata	winger	6 November 2021	v England at Twickenham
730	Afusipa Taumoepeau	centre	6 November 2021	v England at Twickenham
731	Lopeti Timani	flanker	6 November 2021	v England at Twickenham
732	Latu Latunipulu		20 November 2021	v Romania at Bucharest
733	Joe Apikotoa		2 July 2022	v Fiji at Suva
734	Tima Faingaʻanuku		2 July 2022	v Fiji at Suva
735	Malakai Fekitoa		2 July 2022	v Fiji at Suva
736	Israel Folau		2 July 2022	v Fiji at Suva
737	William Havili		2 July 2022	v Fiji at Suva
738	Lotu Inisi		2 July 2022	v Fiji at Suva
739	Manu Paea		2 July 2022	v Fiji at Suva
740	Charles Piutau		2 July 2022	v Fiji at Suva
741	Veikoso Poloniati		2 July 2022	v Fiji at Suva
742	Sione Havili Talitui		2 July 2022	v Fiji at Suva
743	Siate Tokolahi		2 July 2022	v Fiji at Suva
744	Anzelo Tuitavuki		2 July 2022	v Fiji at Suva
745	Feao Fotuaika		9 July 2022	v Samoa at Lautoka
746	Semisi Paea		9 July 2022	v Samoa at Lautoka
747	Vaea Fifita		5 November 2022	v Spain at Málaga
748	Tau Koloamatangi		5 November 2022	v Spain at Málaga
749	Augustine Pulu		5 November 2022	v Spain at Málaga
750	George Moala		5 November 2022	v Spain at Málaga
751	Pita Ahki		14 July 2023	v Australia A at Nukuʻalofa
752	Kyren Taumoefolau		14 July 2023	v Australia A at Nukuʻalofa
753	Patrick Pellegrini		22 July 2023	v Fiji at Lautoka
754	Tasi Feke		15 August 2023	v Canada at Nukuʻalofa
755	Christopher Halaʻufia		15 August 2023	v Canada at Nukuʻalofa
756	John Ika		15 August 2023	v Canada at Nukuʻalofa
757	Paula Latu		15 August 2023	v Canada at Nukuʻalofa
758	Vutulongo Puloka		15 August 2023	v Canada at Nukuʻalofa
759	Sione Tupou		15 August 2023	v Canada at Nukuʻalofa
760	Adam Coleman		24 September 2023	v Scotland at Nice
