= 2023 Rugby World Cup – Oceania qualification =

Tournament details
- Dates: 10 July 2021 – 24 July 2021
- No. of nations: 7

Qualifying for the 2023 Rugby World Cup for Oceania Rugby began in July 2021, where 3 teams competed for one direct qualification spot into the final tournament and for a place in a cross-regional play-off match.

== Format ==
Oceania Rugby was granted one direct qualification berth, and was awarded to the winner on aggregate of a Samoa–Tonga home and away play-off (Oceania 1). The loser then progressed to a straight play-off match against the winner of the 2021 Oceania Rugby Cup to advance as Oceania 2 to a cross-regional play-off against Asia 1. All matches were held in New Zealand due to COVID-19 restrictions and rates in the region.

== Entrants ==
Seven teams had been meant to compete for the Oceania qualifiers for the 2023 Rugby World Cup, but this was later reduced to three after the cancelation of the 2021 Oceania Rugby Cup; teams World Rankings are prior to the first Oceania qualification match on 10 July while nations in bold denote teams that have previously played in a Rugby World Cup.

| Nation | Rank | Began play | Qualifying status |
|---|---|---|---|
| **Australia** | 7 | N/A | Qualified with Top 12 finish at 2019 World Cup |
| Cook Islands | 53 | 24 July | Eliminated by Tonga on 24 July 2021 |
| **Fiji** | 11 | N/A | Qualified with Top 12 finish at 2019 World Cup |
| **New Zealand** | 2 | N/A | Qualified with Top 12 finish at 2019 World Cup |
| Niue | 98 | N/A | Eliminated with 2021 Oceania Rugby Cup Cancellation |
| Papua New Guinea | 83 | N/A | Eliminated with 2021 Oceania Rugby Cup Cancellation |
| **Samoa** | 14 | 10 July | Qualified as Oceania 1 on 17 July 2021 |
| Solomon Islands | 104 | N/A | Eliminated with 2021 Oceania Rugby Cup Cancellation |
| Tahiti | 100 | N/A | Eliminated with 2021 Oceania Rugby Cup Cancellation |
| **Tonga** | 13 | 10 July | Advances to Asia/Pacific play-off as Oceania 2 on 24 July 2021 |

== Round 1: 2021 Oceania Rugby Cup ==
Papua New Guinea were due to host the 2021 Oceania Rugby Cup which was due to take place in June 2021. However, in April 2021, the participating unions agreed to cancel the tournament due to the rising impacts of the COVID-19 pandemic in the region. With the event's cancellation and the tight timeframe available to determine the region's champion, the World Rugby Rankings were used to confirm the team progressing in the Rugby World Rugby 2023 qualification process, and with the Cook Islands the highest-ranked team at the time, earned progression to Round 3.

Advanced to Round 3

| Pos | Team | Rank |
|---|---|---|
| 1 | Cook Islands | 52 |
| 2 | Papua New Guinea | 83 |
| 3 | Niue | 94 |
| 4 | Tahiti | 96 |
| 5 | Solomon Islands | 99 |

== Round 2: Oceania 1 play-offs ==
Round 2 consisted of a 2-leg play-off series between the highest-ranked participating teams in Oceania; Samoa and Tonga. This series was scheduled to be a home-and-away play-off series in Samoa and Tonga, but due to restrictions in the region, New Zealand became the hub for the qualification round.

The winner of this round, Samoa, qualified as Oceania 1, whilst the loser moved to round 3 to play the Cook Islands in an Oceania 2 play-off decider.

| Team 1 | Agg. | Team 2 | 1st leg | 2nd leg |
|---|---|---|---|---|
| Samoa | 79–28 | Tonga | 42–13 | 37–15 |

=== Leg 1 ===
10 July 2021
16:30 NZST (UTC+12)

| Samoa | 42–13 | Tonga |
| Try: Niuia 46' c Motuga 50' m Taefu 56' c Fidow 63' c Ili 78' c Con: Taefu (3/4) 47', 57', 64'; Leuila (1/1) 79'; Pen: Taefu (3/3) 23', 36', 43' | Report; WR Report | Try: Taulani 54' c Con: Takulua (1/1) 55'; Pen: Takulua (2/3) 17', 60' |

Mount Smart Stadium, Auckland, New Zealand
Attendance: 3,000
Referee: Ben O'Keeffe (New Zealand)

Team details

| FB | 15 | Ahsee Tuala | (substituted off) 40' |
| RW | 14 | Tomasi Alosio |
| OC | 13 | Stacey Ili |
| IC | 12 | Henry Taefu |
| LW | 11 | Neria Fomai |
| FH | 10 | Rodney Iona | (substituted off) 72' |
| SH | 9 | Auvasa Faleali'i | (substituted off) 5' |
| N8 | 8 | Henry Stowers | (substituted off) 54' |
| OF | 7 | Alamanda Motuga |
| BF | 6 | Olajuwon Noa |
| RL | 5 | Samuel Slade |
| LL | 4 | Ben Nee-Nee | (substituted off) 67' |
| TP | 3 | Michael Alaalatoa (c) | (substituted off) 64' |
| HK | 2 | Ray Niuia | (substituted off) 57' |
| LP | 1 | Tietie Tuimauga | (substituted off) 60' |
Replacements:
| HK | 16 | Seilala Lam | (substituted in) 57' |
| PR | 17 | Jonah Aoina | (substituted in) 60' |
| PR | 18 | Kalolo Tuiloma | (substituted in) 64' |
| LK | 19 | Theo McFarland | (substituted in) 67' |
| FL | 20 | Jack Lam | (substituted in) 54' |
| SH | 21 | Jonathan Taumateine | (substituted in) 5' |
| FH | 22 | D'Angelo Leuila | (substituted in) 72' |
| WG | 23 | Ed Fidow | (substituted in) 40' |
Coach:
(Samoa) Seilala Mapusua

| FB | 15 | Nafi Tuitavake | (substituted off) 52' |
| RW | 14 | Penikolo Latu | (substituted off) 60' |
| OC | 13 | Fine Inisi |
| IC | 12 | Nikolai Foliaki |
| LW | 11 | Hosea Saumaki |
| FH | 10 | Kali Hala |
| SH | 9 | Sonatane Takulua (c) | (substituted off) 65' |
| N8 | 8 | Nasi Manu | (substituted off) 47' |
| OF | 7 | Mateaki Kafatolu |
| BF | 6 | Sione Tuipulotu |
| RL | 5 | Zane Kapeli | (substituted off) 67' |
| LL | 4 | Don Lolo |
| TP | 3 | Sila Puafisi | (substituted off) 54' |
| HK | 2 | Sam Moli | (substituted off) 60' |
| LP | 1 | Jethro Felemi | (substituted off) 54' |
Replacements:
| HK | 16 | Siua Maile | (substituted in) 60' |
| PR | 17 | Duke Nginingini | (substituted in) 54' |
| PR | 18 | Ben Tameifuna | (substituted in) 54' |
| LK | 19 | Harrison Mataele | (substituted in) 67' |
| FL | 20 | Viliami Taulani | (substituted in) 70' |
| SH | 21 | Leon Fukofuka | (substituted in) 65' |
| CE | 22 | Viliami Fine | (substituted in) 60' |
| WG | 23 | Sam Vaka | (substituted in) 52' |
Coach:
(Australia) Toutai Kefu

Assistant referees:
Angus Mabey (New Zealand)
Marcus Playle (New Zealand)
Television match official:
Glenn Newman (New Zealand)

Notes:

- James Faiva was named to start but withdrew ahead of the game and was replaced by Nafi Tuitavake, who was replaced by Viliami Fine.
- Tomasi Alosio, Jonah Aoina, Neria Fomai, Theo McFarland, Olajuwon Noa, Samuel Slade, Jonathan Taumateine, Kalolo Tuiloma and Tietie Tuimauga (all Samoa) and Viliami Fine and Sam Vaka (both Tonga) made their international debuts.

=== Leg 2 ===
17 July 2021
16:00 NZST (UTC+12)

| Tonga | 15–37 | Samoa |
| Try: Fonokalafi 51' c Tuipulotu 56' c Con: Faiva (1/2) 52'; Pen: Faiva (1/1) 4' | Report; WR Report | Try: Fidow 26' c Taumateine 38' c Ili 73' c Tuiloma 79' c Con: Taefu (3/3) 27', 74', 80'; Iona (1/1) 39'; Pen: Taefu (3/3) 9', 13', 43' |

FMG Stadium Waikato, Hamilton, New Zealand
Attendance: 3,000
Referee: Paul Williams (New Zealand) (Note: Swapped appointments with Brendon Pickerill (Australia v France) after travel restrictions changed between Australia and New Zealand and Williams was unable to travel to Australia.)

Team details

| FB | 15 | Kali Hala |
| RW | 14 | Penikolo Latu | (substituted off) 44' |
| OC | 13 | Fine Inisi |
| IC | 12 | Nikolai Foliaki |
| LW | 11 | Hosea Saumaki | (substituted off) 59' |
| FH | 10 | James Faiva |
| SH | 9 | Sonatane Takulua (c) | (substituted off) 69' |
| N8 | 8 | Nasi Manu | (substituted off) 40' |
| OF | 7 | Mateaki Kafatolu |
| BF | 6 | Sione Tuipulotu |
| RL | 5 | Harrison Mataele | (substituted off) 5' |
| LL | 4 | Don Lolo |
| TP | 3 | Sila Puafisi | (substituted off) 44' |
| HK | 2 | Siua Maile | (substituted off) 9' |
| LP | 1 | Jethro Felemi | (substituted off) 19' |
Replacements:
| HK | 16 | Jay Fonokalafi | (substituted in) 9' |
| PR | 17 | Duke Nginingini | (substituted in) 19' |
| PR | 18 | Ben Tameifuna | (substituted in) 44' |
| FL | 19 | Maama Vaipulu | (substituted in) 40' |
| FL | 20 | Viliami Taulani | (substituted in) 5' |
| SH | 21 | Aisea Halo | (substituted in) 69' |
| WG | 22 | Nafi Tuitavake | (substituted in) 59' |
| WG | 23 | Walter Fifita | (substituted in) 44' |
Coach:
(Australia) Toutai Kefu

| FB | 15 | Tomasi Alosio |
| RW | 14 | Ed Fidow | | (substituted off) 63' |
| OC | 13 | Stacey Ili |
| IC | 12 | Henry Taefu |
| LW | 11 | Neria Fomai |
| FH | 10 | Rodney Iona | | (substituted off) 71' |
| SH | 9 | Jonathan Taumateine | | (substituted off) 74' |
| N8 | 8 | Henry Stowers | | (substituted off) 57' |
| OF | 7 | Alamanda Motuga |
| BF | 6 | Olajuwon Noa | | (substituted off) 65' | (substituted in) 75' |
| RL | 5 | Samuel Slade |
| LL | 4 | Ben Nee-Nee | | (substituted off) 64' |
| TP | 3 | Michael Alaalatoa (c) | | (substituted off) 67' |
| HK | 2 | Ray Niuia | | (substituted off) 75' |
| LP | 1 | Tietie Tuimauga | (yellow card) 65' | | (substituted off) 75' |
Replacements:
| HK | 16 | JP Sauni | | (substituted in) 75' |
| PR | 17 | Jonah Aoina | | (substituted in) 65' |
| PR | 18 | Kalolo Tuiloma | | (substituted in) 67' |
| LK | 19 | Theo McFarland | | (substituted in) 64' |
| FL | 20 | Jack Lam | | (substituted in) 57' |
| SH | 21 | Dwayne Polataivao | | (substituted in) 74' |
| FH | 22 | D'Angelo Leuila | | (substituted in) 71' |
| CE | 23 | Losi Filipo | | (substituted in) 63' |
Coach:
(Samoa) Seilala Mapusua

Assistant referees:
Dan Waenga (New Zealand)
Angus Mabey (New Zealand)
Television match official:
Chris Hart (New Zealand)

Notes:

- Jay Fonokalafi and Aisea Halo (both Tonga) and Losi Filipo and JP Sauni (both Samoa) made their international debuts.

== Round 3: Oceania 2 play-off ==
The winner of this match, Tonga, advanced to a Asia/Oceania play-off match against Asia 1 (as Oceania 2), with the winner earning the right to qualify for the 2023 Rugby World Cup as the Asia/Pacific play-off winner.

24 July 2021
17:35 NZST (UTC+12)

| Tonga | 54–10 | Cook Islands |
| Try: Fifita 18' c Vaka 24' c Tuipulotu (2) 36' c, 55' c Faiva 39' m Takulua (2) 43' c, 48' c Mahe 66' c Con: Faiva (7/8) 20', 25', 37', 44', 49', 56', 68' | Report; WR Report | Try: Tou 27' c Con: To. Sopoaga (1/1) 28'; Pen: To. Sopoaga (1/2) 10' |

Navigation Homes Stadium, Pukekohe, New Zealand
Attendance: 2,000
Referee: Graham Cooper (Australia)

Team details

| FB | 15 | Nikolai Foliaki | (substituted off) 60' |
| RW | 14 | Nafi Tuitavake |
| OC | 13 | Fine Inisi |
| IC | 12 | Sam Vaka | (substituted off) 60' |
| LW | 11 | Walter Fifita | (substituted off) 68' |
| FH | 10 | James Faiva |
| SH | 9 | Sonatane Takulua (c) |
| N8 | 8 | Sione Tuipulotu | (substituted off) 71' |
| OF | 7 | Mateaki Kafatolu |
| BF | 6 | Kelemete Finau | (substituted off) 47' |
| RL | 5 | Viliami Taulani |
| LL | 4 | Semisi Paea |
| TP | 3 | Ben Tameifuna | (substituted off) 60' |
| HK | 2 | Sam Moli | (substituted off) 60' |
| LP | 1 | Duke Nginingini | (substituted off) 71' |
Replacements:
| HK | 16 | Jay Fonokalafi | (substituted in) 60' |
| PR | 17 | Sona Taumalolo | (substituted in) 71' |
| PR | 18 | Sila Puafisi | (substituted in) 60' |
| LK | 19 | Nela Matakaiongo | (substituted in) 71' |
| FL | 20 | Tovo Faleafa | (substituted in) 47' |
| SH | 21 | Leon Fukofuka | (substituted in) 68' |
| FH | 22 | Paula Mahe | (substituted in) 60' |
| WG | 23 | John Tapueluelu | (substituted in) 60' |
Coach:
(Australia) Toutai Kefu

| FB | 15 | Te Puhi Rudolph |
| RW | 14 | Materua Tupou | | (substituted off) 44' |
| OC | 13 | Junior Taia |
| IC | 12 | Leon Ellia-Niukore | | (substituted off) 62' |
| LW | 11 | Tevita Yamaraki |
| FH | 10 | Reece Joyce |
| SH | 9 | Tokahirere Sopoaga |
| N8 | 8 | Leroy Henry-Jack |
| OF | 7 | Tupou Sopoaga (c) | | (substituted off) 65' |
| BF | 6 | Rob Heather | | (substituted off) 49' |
| RL | 5 | Oneal Rongo | | (substituted off) 49' |
| LL | 4 | Tahquinn Hansen |
| TP | 3 | Alex Matapo | | (substituted off) 11' |
| HK | 2 | Ben Tou | | (substituted off) 58' |
| LP | 1 | Antonio Ripata | | (substituted off) 60' |
Replacements:
| PR | 16 | James Pakoti | | (substituted in) 58' |
| PR | 17 | Tuakana Paitai | | (substituted in) 11' |
| HK | 18 | Ezekiel Sopoaga | | (substituted in) 60' |
| LK | 19 | James Kora | | (substituted in) 49' |
| FL | 20 | Jardine Pumati Chung-Ching | | (substituted in) 65' |
| FL | 21 | Francis Smith | (yellow card) 59' | (substituted in) 49' |
| CE | 22 | Gideon Kautai | | (substituted in) 44' |
| FB | 23 | Matamanea Matapakia | | (substituted in) 62' |
Coach:
(Cook Islands) Nathan Robinson

Assistant referees:
Angus Mabey (New Zealand)
Michael Winter (New Zealand)
Television match official:
Aaron Paterson (New Zealand)

Notes:

- Tovo Faleafa, Kelemete Finau, Paula Mahe, Nela Matakaiongo, Semisi Paea and John Tapueluelu (all Tonga) and Jardine Pumati Chung-Ching, Leon Ellia-Niukore, Tahquinn Hansen, Leroy Henry-Jack, Gideon Kautai, Antonio Ripata, Te Puhi Rudolph, Ezekiel Sopoaga, Tokahirere Sopoaga, Tupou Sopoaga, Junior Taia, Materua Tupou, Ben Tou and Tevita Yamaraki (all Cook Islands) made their international debuts.
