= Faingaʻanuku =

Faingaʻanuku is a surname. Notable people with the surname include:

- Leicester Faingaʻanuku (born 1999), New Zealand rugby union player
- Ofa Faingaʻanuku (born 1982), Tongan rugby union player
- Taʻu Faingaʻanuku (born 1972), Tongan rugby union player
- Tima Faingaʻanuku (born 1997), Tongan-born New Zealand rugby union player
