= Taufa (name) =

Taufa is a name. Notable people with the name include:

- Taufa Fukofuka (born 1979), Tongan rugby league player
- Taufa Funaki (born 2000), New Zealand rugby union player
- Taufa Neuffer (born 1978), Tahiti footballer
- Taufa Vakatale 1938–2023), Fijian politician
- Alasika Taufa (born 1970), Tongan rugby union player
- Alaska Taufa (born 1983), Tongan rugby union player
- Api Taufa, Tongan New Zealander netball player
- Simaima Taufa (born 1994), Tongan rugby league player
- Sione Taufa, American rugby league player
- Toetu'u Taufa (born 1980), Tongan-born Japanese rugby union player
- Una Taufa, Tongan rugby league player
- Moala Graham-Taufa (born 2002), New Zealand rugby league footballer
