= Fukofuka =

Fukofuka is a surname. Notable people with the surname include:

- Leon Fukofuka (born 1994), New Zealand rugby union player
- Taufa Fukofuka (born 1979), Tongan rugby league footballer
- Tuʻakalau Fukofuka (born 1972), Tongan former rugby union player
