= Brian Woolley =

Brian Woolley may refer to:

- Brian Woolley (rugby union)
- Brian Woolley (long jumper)
