= Kapeli (name) =

Kapeli is a given name and surname. Notable people with the name include:

- Kapeli Pifeleti (born 1999), Tongan rugby union player
- Rudi Kapeli (born 1957), Tongan rugby union player
- Zane Kapeli (born 1992), Tongan rugby union player
