= Koloi (surname) =

Koloi is a surname. Notable people with the surname include:

- Alysha Koloi (born 2001), Australian diver
- Jonathan Koloi (born 1972), Tongan rugby union player
- Limakatso Koloi, South African politician
- Motshidisi Koloi (born 1970 or 1971), South African politician and educator
- Paul Koloi (born 1972), Tongan rugby league player
