= Fifitapuku Faletau =

Tonga international rugby union player

- Born: 3 October 1968 (age 58) Neiafu, Vava'u, Tonga
- Height: 6 ft 2 in (188 cm)
- Weight: 270 lb (122 kg)

Rugby union career
- Position: Prop
International career
Years	Team	Apps	(Points)
1999	Tonga	9	(0)

Fifitapuku Faletau (born 3 October 1968) is a Tongan former international rugby union player.

Born in Neiafu, Faletau played his rugby as a prop and gained nine caps for Tonga. He was an unused member of Tonga's squad at the 1999 Rugby World Cup and afterwards remained in the United Kingdom to play rugby with Welsh club Dunvant, which he followed with a stint at Narberth.

Faletau settled in Wales, marrying a local.

== See also ==
- List of Tonga national rugby union players
