= Damien Penisini =

- Born: 1 March 1971 (age 55)
- Height: 5 ft 10 in (178 cm)
- Weight: 252 lb (114 kg)

Rugby union career
- Position: Prop
Provincial / State sides
Years	Team	Apps	(Points)
1997–98	Wellington	3	(0)
International career
Years	Team	Apps	(Points)
1997–99	Tonga	6	(0)

Damien Penisini (born 1 March 1971) is a Tongan former international rugby union player.

A powerful tight-head prop, Penisini played provincial rugby in New Zealand with Wellington and had several seasons in the United Kingdom. He competed with Neath in the 1998–99 Heineken Cup and joined fellow Welsh club Ebbw Vale the following season, then played for New Brighton in the north of England.

Penisini competed on the Tonga national team in the late 1990s and gained six caps, which included qualifying matches for the 1999 Rugby World Cup. He made Tonga's World Cup squad but did not get to take the field during the tournament.

== See also ==
- List of Tonga national rugby union players
