= Isi Tapueluelu =

Tonga international rugby union player

- Full name: Isileli Tapueluelu
- Born: 29 September 1970 (age 56)
- Height: 6 ft 0 in (183 cm)
- Weight: 220 lb (100 kg)

Rugby union career
- Position: Utility back
International career
Years	Team	Apps	(Points)
1990–99	Tonga	13	(25)

Isileli Tapueluelu (born 29 September 1970) is a Tongan former international rugby union player.

Capped 13 times, Tapueluelu played for Tonga during the 1990s as a centre, wing and fullback, scoring five tries. He came on off the bench in all three of Tonga's pool matches at the 1999 Rugby World Cup and made his mark against England when he was yellow carded for a dangerous mid-air tackle on Matt Perry, which caused a scuffle between the sides.

Tapueluelu was also a rugby league player and got signed by the Widnes Vikings in 2000.

== See also ==
- List of Tonga national rugby union players
