= Semisi Fakaʻosifolau =

Semisi Faka'osifolau
- Born: 30 April 1976 (age 50)
- Height: 5 ft 11 in (180 cm)
- Weight: 196 lb (89 kg)

Rugby union career
- Position: Wing
International career
Years	Team	Apps	(Points)
1996–01	Tonga	13	(25)

Semisi Faka'osifolau (born 30 April 1976) is a Tongan former international rugby union player.

Faka'osifolau was capped 13 times for Tonga between 1996 and 2001, used mainly as a winger.

A member of the Tongan squad for the 1999 Rugby World Cup, Faka'osifolau was named to play their opening pool match against the All Blacks, but had to withdraw with a hamstring injury and would not get to feature in the tournament.

== See also ==
- List of Tonga national rugby union players
