= Ngalu Tau =

Tonga international rugby union player

- Full name: Ngalusele Taufo'ou
- Born: 15 January 1969 (age 57) Haʻapai, Tonga
- Height: 6 ft 0 in (183 cm)
- Weight: 255 lb (116 kg)

Rugby union career
- Position: Prop
Provincial / State sides
Years	Team	Apps	(Points)
1997	South Canterbury	8	(5)
1998	Auckland	3	(0)
International career
Years	Team	Apps	(Points)
1996–00	Tonga	23	(15)

Ngalusele Taufo'ou (born 15 January 1969), known as Ngalu Tau, is a Tongan former international rugby union player.

Born in Haʻapai, Tau gained 23 caps as a prop for the national team from 1996 to 2000. He started all three of Tonga's pool matches at the 1999 Rugby World Cup. His tournament ended early when was red carded at Twickenham for running in and striking England's Richard Hill during a melee, for which he also received a 28-day suspension.

Tau had a brief stint with New Zealand provincial sides South Canterbury and Auckland in the late 1990s, before plying his trade in the United Kingdom. He played for Welsh club Pontypridd from 1998 to 2001, then made 168 appearances for Doncaster and finished his career with Birmingham & Solihull, where he was still playing into his 40s.

== See also ==
- List of Tonga national rugby union players
