= David Edwards (rugby union, born 1970) =

Tonga international rugby union player

- Full name: David Lavulo Edwards
- Born: 17 December 1970 (age 55) Auckland, New Zealand
- Height: 6 ft 4 in (193 cm)
- Weight: 233 lb (106 kg)
- School: King's College, Auckland

Rugby union career
- Position: Flanker
International career
Years	Team	Apps	(Points)
1998–99	Tonga	10	(0)

David Lavulo Edwards (born 17 December 1970) is a Tongan former international rugby union player.

Edwards is the son of former Tongan cabinet minister Clive Edwards and was born in Auckland, where his father started his political career as a local councillor. He was educated at King's College, Auckland.

A flanker, Edwards gained 10 Tonga caps, debuting against the Wallabies in Canberra in 1998. His other appearances all came in 1999 and included their historic win over France. Representing Tonga at the 1999 Rugby World Cup, Edwards featured in all three pool matches, coming on off the bench against the All Blacks, then starting the matches against Italy and England. He played professional rugby with the Bedford Blues in England and Italian club Benetton Treviso.

== See also ==
- List of Tonga national rugby union players
