= Tietie Tuimauga =

Samoan rugby union player

- Born: 5 August 1993 (age 33) Samoa
- Height: 1.88 m (6 ft 2 in)
- Weight: 130 kg (20 st; 290 lb)

Rugby union career
- Position: Prop
Senior career
Years	Team	Apps	(Points)
2018	Wellington	2	(0)
2020–2021	Manawatu	11	(0)
2021–2022	Connacht	10	(5)
2022	Brive	6	(0)
2022–2025	Montauban	40	(5)
2025–	Saracens	0	(0)
- Correct as of 26 June 2025
International career
Years	Team	Apps	(Points)
2016–2017	Samoa A	5	(5)
2023–	Samoa	8	(0)
- Correct as of 30 August 2024

Tietie Tuimauga (born 5 August 1993) is a Samoan rugby union player, currently playing for English side Saracens F.C. . Previous to that Tietie played for CAB (Brive) in the Top14 French league and two seasons with USM Sapiac Montauban who were crowned champions of ProD2 in 2024. In 2022, Tuimauga was part of the Championship winning Wellington Lions squad in the Bunnings NPC competition. Other contracts include the United Rugby Championship side Connacht in Galway, Ireland. His preferred position is prop.

== Professional career ==
Tuimauga has represented both Wellington and Manawatu in the National Provincial Championship. He earned his first caps for Samoa in the 2023 Rugby World Cup qualifiers against Tonga. In October 2021, he signed for Irish side Connacht.

On 30 October 2022, Tuimauga moved to France to join Brive as a medical joker in the Top 14 competition. Afterwards, he was signed by another French club named Montauban in the Pro D2 from the 2022-23 season.

On 19 May 2025, Tuimauga would sign for English club Saracens in the Premiership Rugby competition ahead of the 2025-26 season.

== Personal life ==
Tuimauga holds a Samoan Matai Chief title of Tausivaatele from his maternal side's village of Fagafau, Savai'i.
