= Taʻu Faingaʻanuku =

Ta'u Fainga'anuku
- Full name: Malakai Ta'ufo'ou Fainga'anuku
- Born: 14 July 1972 (age 54) Kiltifo, Haʻapai, Tonga
- Height: 6 ft 2 in (188 cm)
- Weight: 269 lb (122 kg)
- Notable relative(s): Leicester Fainga'anuku (son); Tima Fainga'anuku (son)

Rugby union career
- Position: Prop
International career
Years	Team	Apps	(Points)
1999–2001	Tonga	12	(5)

Malakai Ta'ufo'ou Fainga'anuku (born 14 July 1972) is a Tongan former rugby union international.

Fainga'anuku, a prop, featured in 12 Test matches for Tonga from 1999 to 2001. He played in all of Tonga's matches at the 1999 Rugby World Cup, including a famous win over Italy. The next day, he had a son born back in Tonga who was given his name Leicester from the city that had hosted the Italy match. Not long after the World Cup, Fainga'anuku immigrated with his family to New Zealand and he played some rugby for Counties Manukau. His son Leicester has since debuted for the All Blacks and another son Tima has been capped for Tonga.

== See also ==
- List of Tonga national rugby union players
