= Latiume Maka =

- Born: 11 February 1970 (age 56)
- Height: 6 ft 0 in (183 cm)
- Weight: 242 lb (110 kg)

Rugby union career
- Position: Hooker / Prop
Provincial / State sides
Years	Team	Apps	(Points)
2002	Counties Manukau	6	(0)
International career
Years	Team	Apps	(Points)
1997–03	Tonga	20	(10)

Latiume Maka (born 11 February 1970) is a Tongan former international rugby union player.

A front-row forward, Maka was capped 20 times for Tonga, debuting in 1997. He represented Tonga at the 1999 Rugby World Cup, where he featured in all three pool matches, including as starting hooker in their win over Italy.

Maka played provincial rugby for Counties Manukau in 2002.

== See also ==
- List of Tonga national rugby union players
