= Jonah Aoina =

Samoan rugby union player

- Born: 25 February 1996 (age 30)
- Height: 1.83 m (6 ft 0 in)
- Weight: 120 kg (265 lb; 18 st 13 lb)
- School: Otago Boys' High School

Rugby union career
- Position: Prop
Senior career
| Years | Team | Apps | (Points) |
| 2016– | Otago | 29 | (15) |
- Correct as of 12 November 2021
International career
| Years | Team | Apps | (Points) |
| 2021– | Samoa | 4 | (0) |
- Correct as of 13 October 2021

Jonah Aoina (born 25 February 1996) in a Samoan rugby union player who plays for Otago in the National Provincial Championship (NPC). He has played for the Samoan national team. His playing position is prop.

== Early life ==
Aoina is from Toamua, Samoa. He arrived in New Zealand in 2013 and attended Otago Boys' High School. In 2014 he scored 18 tries for the school's First XV, including five in one game.

Aoina has played club rugby for Kaikorai RFC.

== Rugby career ==
=== Provincial rugby career ===
He signed for Otago in 2016, making his debut on 1 October 2016 in a 54–17 loss against Auckland, scoring a try on debut.

Aoina has continued playing for Otago since 2016, scoring tries in each of the 2017 and 2018 seasons and earning 27 appearances between 2016 and 2020.

=== International career ===
Aoina was called up to the Samoa national team in 2021. He made his international debut against the Māori All Blacks on 26 June 2021. Aoina played two tests against Tonga in July 2021 as part of the Oceania region 2023 Rugby World Cup qualifiers; Samoa would go on to win both matches and qualify for the 2023 Rugby World Cup.
