= Olajuwon Noa =

Samoan rugby union player

- Born: 28 December 1989 (age 36) New Zealand
- Height: 193 cm (6 ft 4 in)
- Weight: 110 kg (243 lb; 17 st 5 lb)

Rugby union career
- Position: Flanker
- Current team: Bayonne
Senior career
Years	Team	Apps	(Points)
2014	Melbourne Rising	4	(0)
2016	Canberra Vikings	6	(6)
2018–2019	SilverStorm El Salvador	22	(40)
2021	NHRU Wildfires	6	(0)
2021–2022	Sharks	0	(0)
2022	Sharks (Currie Cup)	8	(0)
2022–2023	Bayonne	8	(0)
2024	New Orleans Gold	9	(5)
2025	Seattle Seawolves	0	
- Correct as of 16 September 2022
International career
Years	Team	Apps	(Points)
2021–	Samoa	5	(0)
- Correct as of 23 July 2022

Olajuwon Noa (born 28 December 1989) is a Samoan rugby union player who plays for the Sharks in the United Rugby Championship. His playing position is flanker. Noa joined the Sharks ahead of the 2021–22 United Rugby Championship, having previously played semi-professionally in the Shute Shield for NHRU Wildfires. Noa also represented both the Melbourne Rising and Canberra Vikings in the National Rugby Championship. In 2021, Noa won his first caps for Samoa in their 2023 Rugby World Cup qualifiers against Tonga.
