= Vaʻa Toloke =

Va'a Toloke
- Full name: Solomone Toloke
- Born: 24 August 1974 (age 52)
- Height: 6 ft 4 in (193 cm)
- Weight: 242 lb (110 kg)

Rugby union career
- Position: No. 8
Provincial / State sides
Years	Team	Apps	(Points)
1993	Nelson Bays	10	(5)
1996	Taranaki	7	(0)
International career
Years	Team	Apps	(Points)
1995–02	Tonga	19	(10)

Solomone "Va'a" Toloke (born 24 August 1974) is a Tongan former international rugby union player.

A number eight, Toloke played club rugby for Spotswood United and Riwaka, while turning out at provincial level with Nelson Bays and Taranaki. He also competed in Japan with Chiba-based club Kubota.

Toloke was capped 19 times for Tonga, which included two appearances at the 1999 Rugby World Cup, where he started their match against the All Blacks and came on off the bench against England.

== See also ==
- List of Tonga national rugby union players
