= Jonathan Koloi =

Tonga international rugby union player

- Full name: Sonatane Charles Jonathan Koloi
- Born: 2 July 1972 (age 54) Nuku'alofa, Tonga
- Height: 6 ft 4 in (193 cm)
- Weight: 222 lb (101 kg)
- Notable relative: Jonah Lomu (cousin)

Rugby union career
- Position: Flanker
International career
Years	Team	Apps	(Points)
1998–01	Tonga	15	(30)

Sonatane Charles Jonathan Koloi (born 2 July 1972) is a Tongan former international rugby union player.

Born in Nuku'alofa, Koloi is a second cousin of Jonah Lomu and played his rugby as a flanker.

Koloi was capped 15 times for Tonga, debuting in 1998. He scored a hat-trick of tries as Tonga beat South Korea in Seoul to secure qualification to the 1999 Rugby World Cup, where he would start in all three pool matches, including against Lomu's All Blacks. Prior to the World Cup, Koloi competed with South African Currie Cup side Falcons, a stint organised by Tonga coach David Waterston. He also played in Wales for Aberavon, Carmarthen and Llanelli, as well as with English club Coventry over the course of his career.

== See also ==
- List of Tonga national rugby union players
