= Brian Woolley (rugby union) =

- Born: 18 June 1974 (age 52) Wellington, New Zealand
- Height: 5 ft 10 in (178 cm)
- Weight: 178 lb (81 kg)

Rugby union career
- Position: Fly-half
International career
Years	Team	Apps	(Points)
1998–99	Tonga	9	(3)

Brian Woolley (born 18 June 1974) is a Tongan former international rugby union player.

Woolley was born in Wellington and played for the city's Johnsonville club.

Capped nine times for Tonga, Woolley made the 1999 Rugby World Cup squad and was starting fly-half in their win over Italy at Leicester, where he had to be substituted off after 18 minutes due to injury.

== See also ==
- List of Tonga national rugby union players
