= Leicester Faingaʻanuku =

NZ rugby union player (born 1999)

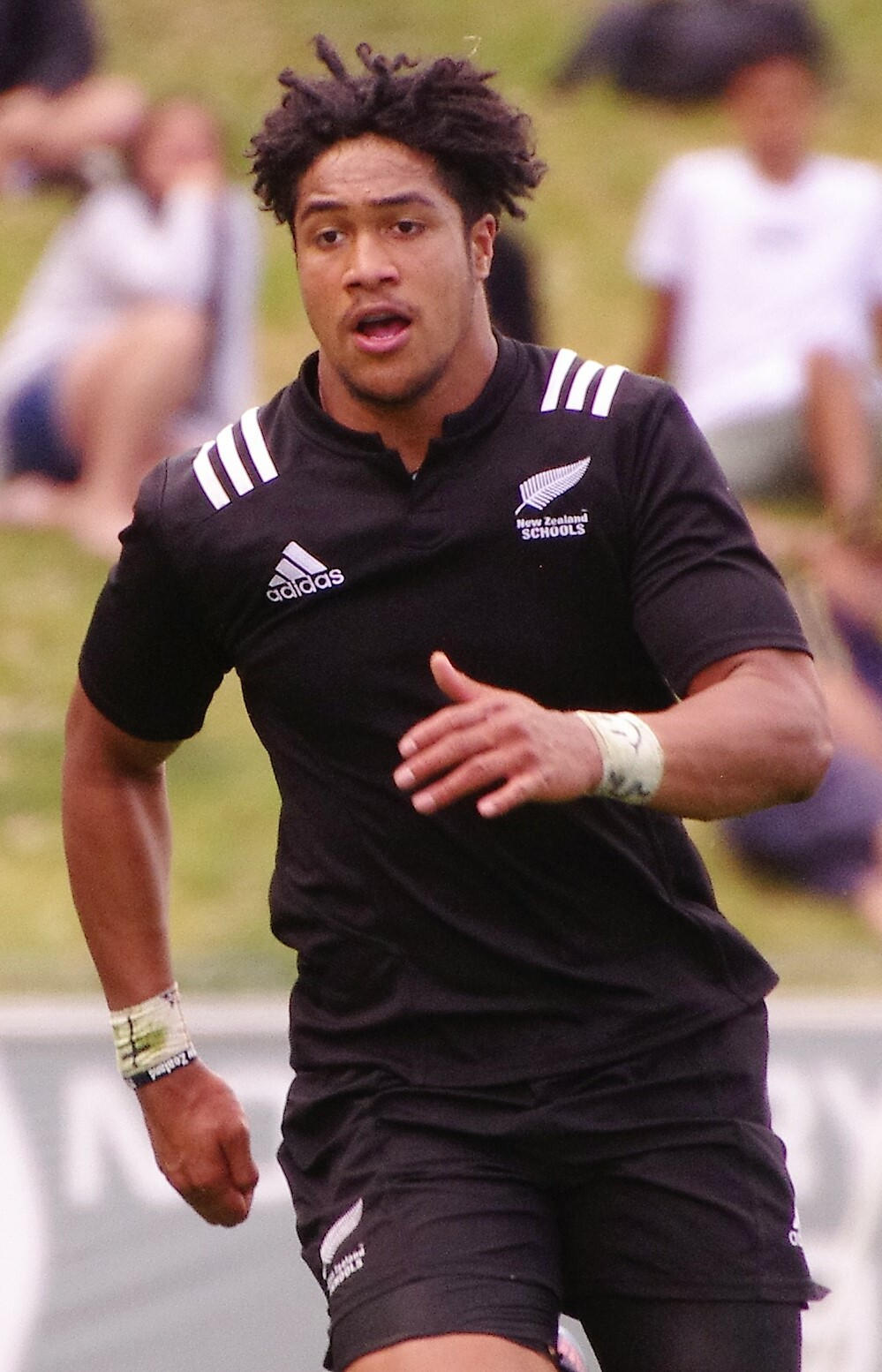
- Full name: Leicester Ofa Ki Wales Twickenham Faingaʻanuku
- Born: 11 October 1999 (age 27) Nuku'alofa, Tonga
- Height: 188 cm (6 ft 2 in)
- Weight: 109 kg (240 lb; 17 st 2 lb)
- School: Nelson College
- Notable relative(s): Taʻu Faingaʻanuku (father); Tima Faingaʻanuku (brother)

Rugby union career
- Position(s): Wing, Centre, Flanker
- Current team: Tasman, Crusaders
Senior career
Years	Team	Apps	(Points)
2018–2023, 2025–	Tasman	45	(120)
2019–2023, 2026–	Crusaders	70	(185)
2023–2025	Toulon	39	(80)
- Correct as of 15 November 2026
International career
Years	Team	Apps	(Points)
2018–2019	New Zealand U20	9	(35)
2020	South Island	1	(0)
2020	Moana Pasifika	1	(0)
2022–	New Zealand	14	(30)
2022	All Blacks XV	1	(0)
- Correct as of 21 November 2026
Medal record
Men's Rugby union
Representing New Zealand
Rugby World Cup
Silver medal – second place	2023 France	Squad

Leicester Ofa Ki Wales Twickenham Faingaʻanuku (born 11 October 1999) is a rugby union player, who plays as a wing or centre for Tasman in the Bunnings NPC, the Crusaders in Super Rugby and the All Blacks. He previously played for Toulon in the Top 14. Born in Tonga, he represents New Zealand internationally.

== Early career ==
Faingaʻanuku was born in Nuku'alofa, Tonga. His father, Taʻu Faingaʻanuku, and his older brother, Tima Faingaʻanuku, have both played for the Tonga national team.

His father Taʻu Faingaʻanuku played prop for Tonga in the 1999 Rugby World Cup. One of the games during the World Cup, in which Tonga beat Italy, was played at Welford Road Stadium, Leicester, England. Ta'u named his son after the city in honour of the game. Wales was used as one of his middle names as the hosts and Twickenham was named after Twickenham Stadium where Tonga were due to play their next match.

He was educated at Nelson College, where he was captain of the school's first XV.

== Senior career ==
=== Tasman ===
Faingaʻanuku was named in the Tasman Mako squad for the first time for the 2018 Mitre 10 Cup season and made his debut in Round 8 when Tasman played Otago at Forsyth Barr Stadium in Dunedin, coming off the bench in a 21–47 win for the Mako. He was part of the Tasman team that won the Mitre 10 Cup for the first time in 2019. He was again part of the Mako side that won the 2020 Mitre 10 Cup. Faingaʻanuku had an outstanding 2021 Bunnings NPC season as Tasman made the final before losing 23–20 to Waikato.

=== Crusaders ===
Faingaʻanuku was named in the Crusaders squad for the 2019 Super Rugby season, after signing a three-year contract with the franchise. He made his debut for the franchise, off the bench, against the Brumbies in Round 11, but that was the only game he played in the 2019 season as the Crusaders went on to win their third Super Rugby title in a row.

During the following seasons, Faingaʻanuku cemented himself in the squad, from 2022 as a regular starter. He starred during that season, which he finished as the joined top try scorer with Crusaders teammates Sevu Reece and Will Jordan at 10 tries each. The Crusaders won their sixth title in a row with a 7–21 win over the Blues in the final.

The 2023 season was Faingaʻanuku's last season with the Crusaders. On 8 June 2023, the Crusaders announced that he had signed an 18-month contract with French Top 14 club Toulon. Less than three weeks later, the Crusaders won their seventh consecutive Super Rugby title, beating the Chiefs 20–25 in the final. Faingaʻanuku finished the 2023 Super Rugby Pacific season as the competition's top try scorer with 13 tries.

In April 2026, Fainga'anuku was named to start at flanker when the Crusaders played against the Waratahs in the opening game of the new One NZ stadium.

=== North v South ===
Faingaʻanuku was named on the South Island team's bench for the North vs South match that was played on 5 September 2020 at Sky Stadium in Wellington. The South Island won the game 38–35.

=== Moana Pasifika ===
On 5 December 2020, Faingaʻanuku played for Moana Pasifika in a one-off match against the Māori All Blacks in Hamilton. He started in the number 14 jersey in a historic game that the Moana Pasifika side lost 21–28.

== International career ==
Faingaʻanuku was selected in the All Blacks squad for the 2022 Steinlager Series against Ireland. He was named to debut as a starting winger in the first test of the series on 2 July 2022 at Eden Park, Auckland. New Zealand won the match 42–19, with Faingaʻanuku becoming All Black number 1200.

On 7 August 2023, Faingaʻanuku was named in the All Blacks squad for the 2023 Rugby World Cup. He made his World Cup debut – via the bench – on 8 September 2023 in the round 1 loss against France. He scored his first ever try for the All Blacks in the second pool match against Namibia on 15 September 2023. On 5 October 2023, Faingaʻanuku scored a hat-trick in the final pool match against Uruguay.
