= Sam Vaka =

New Zealand rugby union footballer (born 1992)

- Born: 26 October 1992 (age 34) Ōtāhuhu, New Zealand
- Height: 1.86 m (6 ft 1 in)
- Weight: 95 kg (14 st 13 lb; 209 lb)

Rugby union career
- Position: Midfield Back
Senior career
Years	Team	Apps	(Points)
2013−17	Counties Manukau	34	(10)
2015-16	Chiefs	3	(5)
2018-2021	SU Agen Lot-et-Garonne	34	(35)
2021-2025	Kyuden Voltex	32	(80)
- Correct as of 23 October 2016
International career
Years	Team	Apps	(Points)
2014−15	All Blacks Sevens		
2021	Tonga	1	
- Correct as of 1 November 2015

Sam Vaka (born 26 October 1992) is a New Zealand rugby union player who currently plays as a midfield back for Counties Manukau in the ITM Cup. Solid domestic performances for them over the course of 3 seasons saw him named in the Chiefs wider training group ahead of the 2016 Super Rugby season.

Vaka was an All Blacks Sevens representative in 2014 and 2015.
