= Alasika Taufa =

Tonga international rugby union player

- Born: Alasika S. Taufa; 14 August 1970 (age 56) Tonga
- Notable relative: Alaska Taufa (son)

Rugby union career
- Position: Wing
Amateur team(s)
Years	Team	Apps	(Points)
- Old Boys College/University
–	Harlequins		
Provincial / State sides
Years	Team	Apps	(Points)
1992-1995	Wellington	26	(67)
International career
Years	Team	Apps	(Points)
1993-1995	Tonga	5	(5)

Alasika S. Taufa, known also as Alaska Taufa (born 14 August 1970) is a Tongan former rugby union player who played as wing. He is father of his namesake Alaska Taufa, who is also a Tongan rugby union international.

== Career ==
Taufa first played for Tonga on 4 July 1993, against Australia, in Brisbane. He was also part of the 1995 Rugby World Cup Tonga squad, playing two matches in the tournament, with the match against Scotland in Pretoria, on 30 May 1995 being his final international cap. At club level, Taufa played the National Provincial Championship for Wellington between 1992 and 1995.
