= Tuʻakalau Fukofuka =

Kalau Fukofuka
- Born: Tuʻakalau Fukofuka; 1972 (age 53–54) Tonga
- School: St Paul's College, Auckland

Rugby union career
- Position: Prop
Amateur team(s)
Years	Team	Apps	(Points)
1995	Grammar Carlton		
1996	Mid Northern		
Provincial / State sides
Years	Team	Apps	(Points)
1995	Auckland	3	(0)
1996	Northland	2	(0)
1999	Auckland	4	(0)
International career
Years	Team	Apps	(Points)
1993–1995	Tonga	8	(0)

Tuʻakalau Fukofuka, known also as Kalau Fukofuka (born Tonga, in 1972) is a Tongan former rugby union player. He played as prop.

== Career ==
Fukofuka debuted for the Tonga national rugby union team during a match against Fiji in Nuku'alofa on 17 July 1993. He also took part at the 1995 Rugby World Cup, playing all the three pool stage matches in the tournament. His last cap for Tonga was on 15 July 1995 in Suva, also against Fiji. At club level, Fukofuka played the National Provincial Championship for Auckland and for Northland.

== Personal life ==
He is father of the Crusaders scrum-half Leon Fukofuka.
