= Alaska Taufa =

Tonga international rugby union player

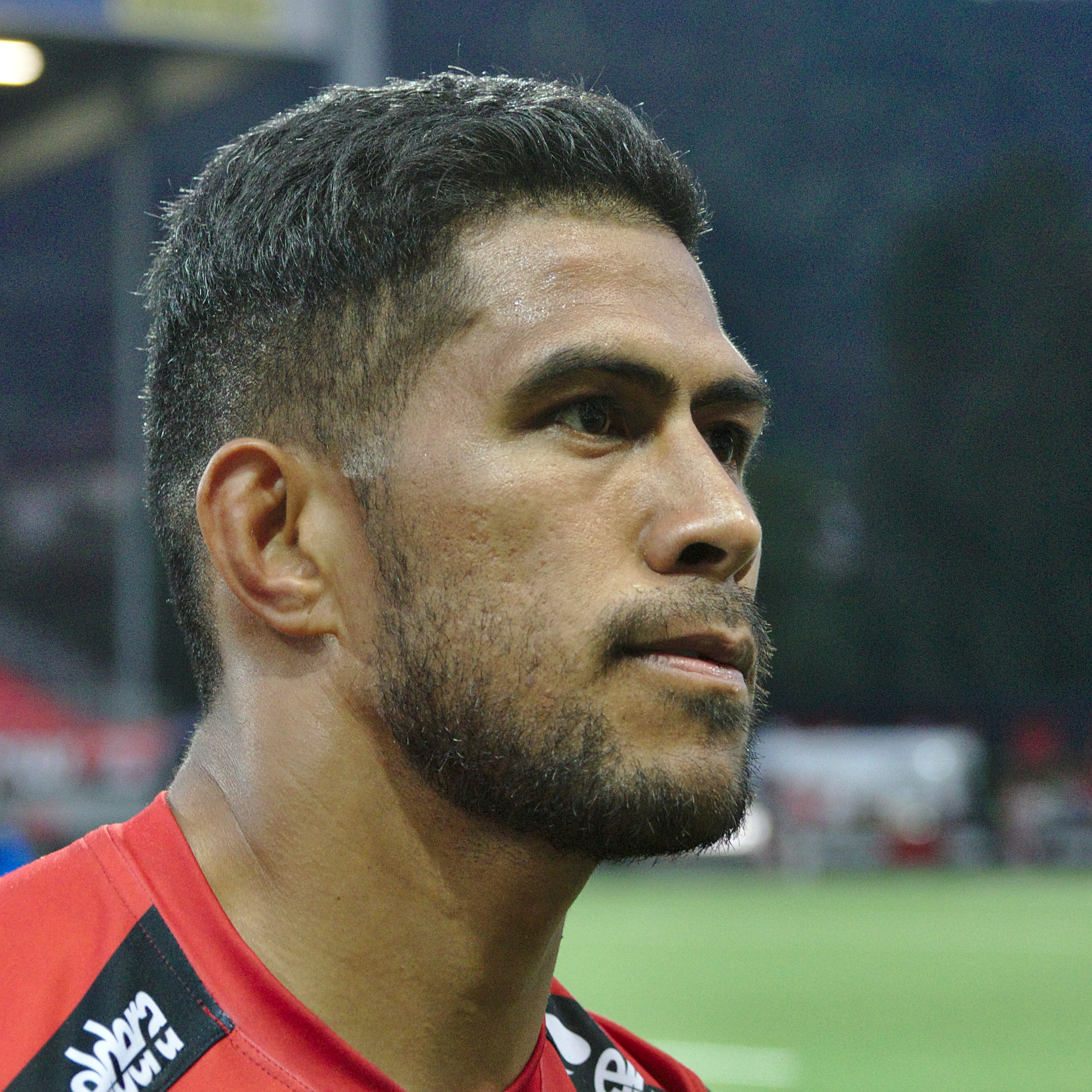
- Born: Alaska Nikolasi Taufa; 24 July 1983 (age 43) Ha'ateiho, Tonga
- Height: 6 ft 2 in (188 cm)
- Weight: 227 lb (103 kg)
- School: Tonga College
- Notable relative: Alasika Taufa (cousin)

Rugby union career
- Position(s): Center, Wing
Senior career
Years	Team	Apps	(Points)
2014-2017	Oyonnax Rugby	49	(50)
2017-	FC Grenoble	34	(10)
International career
Years	Team	Apps	(Points)
2010–	Tonga	12	(20)

Alaska Taufa (born 24 July 1983) is a Tongan rugby union footballer. His usual position is on the wing. He was part of the Tongan squad at the 2011 Rugby World Cup where he played in one match. He has also signed with French club Oyonnax for the 2015 season. He is the son of Alasika Taufa, who was also a Tongan international in the 1995 Rugby World Cup.
