= Rudi Kapeli =

- Born: 27 August 1957 (age 69)

Rugby union career
- Position: Hooker
Amateur team(s)
Years	Team	Apps	(Points)
1989	Marist		
Provincial / State sides
Years	Team	Apps	(Points)
- Auckland
International career
Years	Team	Apps	(Points)
1992-1993	Tonga	4	
Coaching career
- Years: Team
- 2001: Marist

Rudi Kapeli (born 27 August 1957) is a Tongan rugby union player. He played as a Hooker for Tonga and Auckland. He made his international debut in 1992 against Samoa and made his last appearance against Australia in 1993. He injured Australian halfback Peter Slattery in the match when he dropped onto him with his knees. He captained Marist in 1989. Kapeli also coached Marist.
