= Tima Faingaʻanuku =

Tonga international rugby union player

Tima Fainga'anuku
- Full name: Lotima Taufo'ou Fainga'anuku
- Born: 26 April 1997 (age 29) Nuku'alofa, Tonga
- Height: 1.90 m (6 ft 3 in)
- Weight: 105 kg (16 st 7 lb; 231 lb)
- School: Nelson College
- Notable relative: Leicester Fainga'anuku (brother)

Rugby union career
- Position(s): Wing, Centre
- Current team: North Harbour
Senior career
Years	Team	Apps	(Points)
2016–2020	Tasman	42	(40)
2018–2019	Perpignan	14	(15)
2021–2023	Manawatu	24	(30)
2024–	North Harbour	14	(15)
- Correct as of 4 October 2025
Super Rugby
Years	Team	Apps	(Points)
2018	Crusaders	2	(0)
2020	Highlanders	2	(0)
2022–2023	Moana Pasifika	14	(20)
- Correct as of 11 June 2025
International career
Years	Team	Apps	(Points)
2017	New Zealand U20	7	(15)
2022–	Tonga	9	(10)
- Correct as of 11 June 2025
National sevens team
Years	Team		Comps
2018	New Zealand		1
- Correct as of 11 June 2025

Lotima Taufo'ou Fainga'anuku (born 26 April 1997) is a Tongan rugby union player who currently plays for North Harbour in the Bunnings NPC. He usually plays in the wing or centre positions.

== Early career ==
Fainga'anuku was educated at Nelson College from 2011 to 2015. He was a part of the New Zealand Under 20s winning team over England Under 20s 64–17 in the 2017 World Rugby Under 20 Championship.

== Senior career ==
=== Early career ===
Fainga'anuku started his senior career at Tasman in 2016. He made his Super Rugby debut for the Crusaders in their 34–20 win over the Chiefs in Round 16, 2018. Tima was named in the Highlanders 2020 squad after Connor Garden-Bachop had to withdraw because of injury. He was part of the Mako side that won the 2020 Mitre 10 Cup.

=== 2021-2024 ===
In June 2021, it was announced that Fainga'anuku would be switching his international eligibility to Tonga using the Olympic loophole, representing Tonga Sevens at the 2020 Men's Rugby Sevens Final Olympic Qualification Tournament, but due to quarantining issues relating to the COVID-19 pandemic he was unable to play. Fainga'anuku made the move to Manawatu on a 2-year deal. In May 2022 he was named in the Tonga national squad.

Fainga'anuku was recalled to the Tonga squad for their2024 end of year tests, after leaving Manawatu to join North Harbour.
