= Leon Fukofuka =

- Full name: Leon Fukofuka
- Born: 8 September 1995 (age 31) Auckland, New Zealand
- Height: 1.85 m (6 ft 1 in)
- Weight: 94 kg (14 st 11 lb; 207 lb)
- School: Kelston Boys' High School
- Notable relative: Tuʻakalau Fukofuka (father)

Rugby union career
- Position: Halfback
- Current team: Auckland
Youth career
- 2008−12: Auckland
Senior career
Years	Team	Apps	(Points)
2014−	Auckland	34	(5)
2016−2018	Crusaders	15	(0)
- Correct as of 19 November 2018
International career
Years	Team	Apps	(Points)
2014	New Zealand Under-20	4	(5)
2017	Tonga	7	(0)
- Correct as of 11 September 2019

Leon Fukofuka (born 8 September 1994) is a rugby union player who currently plays as a halfback for Auckland in New Zealand's domestic Mitre 10 Cup and is a Tonga international.

== Early career ==
The son of former Auckland and Tonga Prop, Kalau Fukofuka, Leon was born and raised in West Auckland and played first XV rugby for Kelston Boys' High School, initially as a flanker before switching to halfback in year 11. After graduating from high school, he began playing for Marist in Auckland's Premier club rugby competition and also turned out for Auckland's sevens team.

== Senior career ==
He was first named in Auckland's senior squad for the 2014 ITM Cup and made a total of 7 appearances in the competition, although only 3 were starts as he largely played backup to the more experienced Junior Poluleuligaga. 2015 was largely a right-off as a shoulder injury restricted him to just a solitary appearance during Auckland's run to the ITM Cup Premiership final while 2016 saw him return to full fitness and play in all 10 of Auckland's regular season games as they finished in a disappointing 5th place which saw them miss out on the play-offs.

== Super Rugby ==
Despite his relative lack of experience, an injury to All Blacks halfback Tawera Kerr-Barlow paved the way for Fukofuka to be named in the Chiefs wider training group for the 2015 Super Rugby season. The presence of two excellent number 9s in the shape of Augustine Pulu and Brad Weber meant that Fukofuka didn't see any game time during the campaign and subsequently transferred to the Crusaders wider training group for 2016. With the franchise's first choice halfback Andy Ellis returning from a spell in Japan after the season had begun, Fukofuka was able to get some game time as back up to Mitchell Drummond, debuting as a substitute in a home game against his former side, the Chiefs. He found himself promoted to the senior squad for 2017 where he would compete against Drummond and new arrival from the Blues, Bryn Hall for a starting berth.

== International ==
Fukofuka was selected for the New Zealand Barbarians Schools side in 2012 and 2 years later was a member of the New Zealand Under-20 side which finished 3rd at the 2014 IRB Junior World Championship in his home country where he played once and scored one try.

== Super Rugby Statistics ==
As of 23 December 2016

Season	Team	Games	Starts	Sub	Mins	Tries	Cons	Pens	Drops	Points	Yel	Red
2016	Crusaders	12	0	4	0	0	0	0	0	0	0	0
Total		12	0	4	0	0	0	0	0	0	0	0
