= 2003 Rugby World Cup Pool A =

Pool A was one of four pools at the 2003 Rugby World Cup into which the 20 participating teams were divided. The pool included hosts Australia and Argentina, who both qualified automatically having reached the quarter-finals of the 1999 tournament, along with Ireland, Romania and Namibia.

== Teams ==
| Team | Method of qualification | Date of qualification | Apps. | Last | Previous best performance | IRB World Ranking (6 October 2003) |
|---|---|---|---|---|---|---|
| Australia | Hosts | 10 October 1999 | 5th | 1999 | Winners (1991, 1999) | 4 |
| Argentina | Quarter-finalists in 1999 | 16 October 1999 | 5th | 1999 | Quarter-finals (1999) | 7 |
| Ireland | Europe 1 | 28 September 2002 | 5th | 1999 | Quarter-finals (1987, 1991, 1995) | 3 |
| Romania | Europe 3 | 5 October 2002 | 5th | 1999 | Pool stage (1987, 1991, 1995, 1999) | 15 |
| Namibia | Africa | 13 October 2002 | 2nd | 1999 | Pool stage (1999) | 25 |

== Standings ==
| Pos | Team | Pld | W | D | L | PF | PA | PD | B | Pts | Qualification |
|---|---|---|---|---|---|---|---|---|---|---|---|
| 1 | Australia (H) | 4 | 4 | 0 | 0 | 273 | 32 | +241 | 2 | 18 | Advance to quarter-finals, and qualification to the 2007 Rugby World Cup |
| 2 | Ireland | 4 | 3 | 0 | 1 | 141 | 56 | +85 | 3 | 15 | Advance to quarter-finals, and qualification to the 2007 Rugby World Cup |
| 3 | Argentina | 4 | 2 | 0 | 2 | 140 | 57 | +83 | 3 | 11 | Qualification to the 2007 Rugby World Cup |
| 4 | Romania | 4 | 1 | 0 | 3 | 65 | 192 | −127 | 1 | 5 | |
| 5 | Namibia | 4 | 0 | 0 | 4 | 28 | 310 | −282 | 0 | 0 | |

(H) Host

In the quarter-finals:

- The winners of Pool A advanced to play the runners-up of Pool B.
- The runners-up of Pool A advanced to play the winners of Pool B.

== Matches ==
=== Australia vs Argentina ===
10 October 2003

| Australia | 24–8 | Argentina |
| Try: Sailor; Roff; Con: Flatley; Pen: Flatley (4) | Report | Try: Corleto; Pen: M. Contepomi |

Stadium Australia, Sydney
Attendance: 81,350
Referee: Paul Honiss (New Zealand)

| FB | 15 | Mat Rogers |
| RW | 14 | Wendell Sailor |
| OC | 13 | Matt Burke |
| IC | 12 | Elton Flatley |
| LW | 11 | Joe Roff |
| FH | 10 | Stephen Larkham |
| SH | 9 | George Gregan (c) |
| N8 | 8 | David Lyons |
| OF | 7 | Phil Waugh |
| BF | 6 | George Smith |
| RL | 5 | Nathan Sharpe |
| LL | 4 | David Giffin |
| TP | 3 | Al Baxter |
| HK | 2 | Brendan Cannon |
| LP | 1 | Bill Young |
Replacements:
| HK | 16 | Jeremy Paul |
| PR | 17 | Ben Darwin |
| LK | 18 | Dan Vickerman |
| FL | 19 | Matt Cockbain |
| SH | 20 | Chris Whitaker |
| FH | 21 | Matt Giteau |
| WG | 22 | Lote Tuqiri |
Coach:
Eddie Jones

| FB | 15 | Ignacio Corleto |
| RW | 14 | José María Núñez Piossek |
| OC | 13 | Manuel Contepomi |
| IC | 12 | José Orengo |
| LW | 11 | Diego Albanese |
| FH | 10 | Felipe Contepomi |
| SH | 9 | Agustín Pichot (c) |
| N8 | 8 | Gonzalo Longo |
| OF | 7 | Rolando Martín |
| BF | 6 | Santiago Phelan |
| RL | 5 | Patricio Albacete |
| LL | 4 | Ignacio Fernández Lobbe |
| TP | 3 | Omar Hasan |
| HK | 2 | Mario Ledesma |
| LP | 1 | Roberto Diego Grau |
Replacements:
| HK | 16 | Federico Méndez |
| PR | 17 | Mauricio Reggiardo |
| LK | 18 | Rimas Álvarez Kairelis |
| FL | 19 | Martín Durand |
| SH | 20 | Nicolás Fernández Miranda |
| FH | 21 | Gonzalo Quesada |
| CE | 22 | Juan Martín Hernández |
Coach:
Marcelo Loffreda

=== Ireland vs Romania ===
11 October 2003

| Ireland | 45–17 | Romania |
| Try: S. Horgan; Wood; Hickie (2); Costello; Con: Humphreys (3); O'Gara; Pen: Humphreys (4) | Report | Try: Penalty try Maftei; Con: Tofan; Vioreanu; Pen: Tofan |

Central Coast Stadium, Gosford
Attendance: 19,123
Referee: Jonathan Kaplan (South Africa)

| FB | 15 | Girvan Dempsey |
| RW | 14 | Shane Horgan |
| OC | 13 | Brian O'Driscoll |
| IC | 12 | Kevin Maggs |
| LW | 11 | Denis Hickie |
| FH | 10 | David Humphreys |
| SH | 9 | Peter Stringer |
| N8 | 8 | Anthony Foley |
| OF | 7 | Keith Gleeson |
| BF | 6 | Victor Costello |
| RL | 5 | Malcolm O'Kelly |
| LL | 4 | Paul O'Connell |
| TP | 3 | Reggie Corrigan |
| HK | 2 | Keith Wood (c) |
| LP | 1 | Marcus Horan |
Replacements:
| HK | 16 | Shane Byrne |
| PR | 17 | John Hayes |
| LK | 18 | Donncha O'Callaghan |
| FL | 19 | Alan Quinlan |
| SH | 20 | Guy Easterby |
| FH | 21 | Ronan O'Gara |
| WG | 22 | John Kelly |
Coach:
Eddie O'Sullivan

| FB | 15 | Dănuț Dumbravă |
| RW | 14 | Cristian Săuan |
| OC | 13 | Valentin Maftei |
| IC | 12 | Romeo Gontineac |
| LW | 11 | Gabriel Brezoianu |
| FH | 10 | Ionuț Tofan |
| SH | 9 | Lucian Sîrbu |
| N8 | 8 | Cristian Petre |
| OF | 7 | Ovidiu Tonița |
| BF | 6 | George Chiriac |
| RL | 5 | Augustin Petrechei |
| LL | 4 | Sorin Socol |
| TP | 3 | Marcel Socaciu |
| HK | 2 | Răzvan Mavrodin |
| LP | 1 | Petru Bălan |
Replacements:
| HK | 16 | Petrișor Toderașc |
| PR | 17 | Cezar Popescu |
| FL | 18 | Alexandru Tudori |
| N8 | 19 | Marius Niculai |
| SH | 20 | Iulian Andrei |
| CE | 21 | Mihai Vioreanu |
| WG | 22 | Ion Teodorescu |
Coach:
(France) Bernard Charreyre

=== Argentina vs Namibia ===
14 October 2003

| Argentina | 67–14 | Namibia |
| Try: Méndez; Bouza (2); J. Fernández Miranda; Penalty try (2); Gaitán (3); N. Fernández Miranda; Con: Quesada (7); Pen: Quesada | Report | Try: Grobler; Husselman; Con: Wessels (2) |

Central Coast Stadium, Gosford
Attendance: 17,887
Referee: Nigel Williams (Wales)

| FB | 15 | Juan Martín Hernández |
| RW | 14 | Hernán Senillosa |
| OC | 13 | Martín Gaitán |
| IC | 12 | Juan Fernández Miranda |
| LW | 11 | Diego Albanese |
| FH | 10 | Gonzalo Quesada |
| SH | 9 | Nicolás Fernández Miranda (c) |
| N8 | 8 | Pablo Bouza |
| OF | 7 | Lucas Ostiglia |
| BF | 6 | Martín Durand |
| RL | 5 | Pedro Sporleder |
| LL | 4 | Rimas Álvarez Kairelis |
| TP | 3 | Martín Scelzo |
| HK | 2 | Federico Méndez |
| LP | 1 | Mauricio Reggiardo |
Replacements:
| HK | 16 | Mario Ledesma |
| PR | 17 | Rodrigo Roncero |
| LK | 18 | Patricio Albacete |
| LK | 19 | Ignacio Fernández Lobbe |
| SH | 20 | Agustín Pichot |
| FH | 21 | Felipe Contepomi |
| WG | 22 | Ignacio Corleto |
Coach:
Marcelo Loffreda

| FB | 15 | Jurie Booysen |
| RW | 14 | Deon Mouton |
| OC | 13 | Du Preez Grobler |
| IC | 12 | Corne Powell |
| LW | 11 | Melrick Africa |
| FH | 10 | Emile Wessels |
| SH | 9 | Hakkies Husselman |
| N8 | 8 | Sean Furter (c) |
| OF | 7 | Herman Lintvelt |
| BF | 6 | Schalk van der Merwe |
| RL | 5 | Eben Isaacs |
| LL | 4 | Heino Senekal |
| TP | 3 | Niel du Toit |
| HK | 2 | Johannes Meyer |
| LP | 1 | Kees Lensing |
Replacements:
| HK | 16 | Cor van Tonder |
| PR | 17 | Andries Blaauw |
| FL | 18 | Wolfie Duvenhage |
| N8 | 19 | Jurgens van Lill |
| SH | 20 | Ronaldo Pedro |
| WG | 21 | Niel Swanepoel |
| FB | 22 | Vincent Dreyer |
Coach:
(New Zealand) David Waterston

=== Australia vs Romania ===
18 October 2003

| Australia | 90–8 | Romania |
| Try: Flatley; Rogers (3); Burke (2); Larkham (2); Mortlock; Roff; Giteau; Tuqiri; Smith; Con: Flatley (11); Pen: Flatley | Report | Try: Toderașc; Pen: Tofan |

Suncorp Stadium, Brisbane
Attendance: 48,778
Referee: Pablo De Luca (Argentina)

| FB | 15 | Mat Rogers |
| RW | 14 | Wendell Sailor |
| OC | 13 | Matt Burke |
| IC | 12 | Elton Flatley |
| LW | 11 | Joe Roff |
| FH | 10 | Stephen Larkham |
| SH | 9 | George Gregan (c) |
| N8 | 8 | David Lyons |
| OF | 7 | Phil Waugh |
| BF | 6 | George Smith |
| RL | 5 | Dan Vickerman |
| LL | 4 | Nathan Sharpe |
| TP | 3 | Bill Young |
| HK | 2 | Brendan Cannon |
| LP | 1 | Al Baxter |
Replacements:
| HK | 16 | Jeremy Paul |
| PR | 17 | Ben Darwin |
| LK | 18 | Justin Harrison |
| FL | 19 | Matt Cockbain |
| FH | 20 | Matt Giteau |
| CE | 21 | Stirling Mortlock |
| WG | 22 | Lote Tuqiri |
Coach:
Eddie Jones

| FB | 15 | Dănuț Dumbravă |
| RW | 14 | Gabriel Brezoianu |
| OC | 13 | Valentin Maftei |
| IC | 12 | Romeo Gontineac (c) |
| LW | 11 | Cristian Săuan |
| FH | 10 | Ionuț Tofan |
| SH | 9 | Lucian Sîrbu |
| N8 | 8 | George Chiriac |
| OF | 7 | Ovidiu Tonița |
| BF | 6 | Marius Niculai |
| RL | 5 | Cristian Petre |
| LL | 4 | Sorin Socol |
| TP | 3 | Silviu Florea |
| HK | 2 | Răzvan Mavrodin |
| LP | 1 | Petrișor Toderașc |
Replacements:
| HK | 16 | Cezar Popescu |
| PR | 17 | Marcel Socaciu |
| FL | 18 | Alexandru Tudori |
| LK | 19 | Bogdan Tudor |
| SH | 20 | Cristian Podea |
| FH | 21 | Mihai Vioreanu |
| WG | 22 | Ion Teodorescu |
Coach:
(France) Bernard Charreyre

=== Ireland vs Namibia ===
19 October 2003

| Ireland | 64–7 | Namibia |
| Try: Quinlan (2); Dempsey; Hickie; Horan; Miller (2); G. Easterby; S. Horgan; Kelly; Con: O'Gara (7) | Report | Try: Powell; Con: Wessels |

Aussie Stadium, Sydney
Attendance: 35,382
Referee: Andrew Cole (Australia)

| FB | 15 | Girvan Dempsey |
| RW | 14 | Shane Horgan |
| OC | 13 | Brian O'Driscoll |
| IC | 12 | Kevin Maggs |
| LW | 11 | Denis Hickie |
| FH | 10 | Ronan O'Gara |
| SH | 9 | Peter Stringer |
| N8 | 8 | Simon Easterby |
| OF | 7 | Alan Quinlan |
| BF | 6 | Eric Miller |
| RL | 5 | Malcolm O'Kelly |
| LL | 4 | Paul O'Connell |
| TP | 3 | John Hayes |
| HK | 2 | Keith Wood (c) |
| LP | 1 | Marcus Horan |
Replacements:
| HK | 16 | Shane Byrne |
| PR | 17 | Simon Best |
| LK | 18 | Donncha O'Callaghan |
| N8 | 19 | Victor Costello |
| SH | 20 | Guy Easterby |
| FH | 21 | David Humphreys |
| WG | 22 | John Kelly |
Coach:
Eddie O'Sullivan

| FB | 15 | Ronaldo Pedro |
| RW | 14 | Deon Mouton |
| OC | 13 | Du Preez Grobler |
| IC | 12 | Corne Powell |
| LW | 11 | Vincent Dreyer |
| FH | 10 | Emile Wessels |
| SH | 9 | Hakkies Husselman |
| N8 | 8 | Sean Furter (c) |
| OF | 7 | Wolfie Duvenhage |
| BF | 6 | Schalk van der Merwe |
| RL | 5 | Archie Graham |
| LL | 4 | Heino Senekal |
| TP | 3 | Niel du Toit |
| HK | 2 | Johannes Meyer |
| LP | 1 | Kees Lensing |
Replacements:
| HK | 16 | Cor van Tonder |
| PR | 17 | Andries Blaauw |
| FL | 18 | Herman Lintvelt |
| N8 | 19 | Jurgens van Lill |
| WG | 20 | Niel Swanepoel |
| WG | 21 | Melrick Africa |
| FH | 22 | Morné Schreuder |
Coach:
(New Zealand) David Waterston

=== Argentina vs Romania ===
22 October 2003

| Argentina | 50–3 | Romania |
| Try: Gaitán; Hernández (2); M. Contepomi; N. Fernández Miranda; Bouza (2); Con: J. Fernández Miranda (4); Quesada (2); Pen: J. Fernández Miranda | Report | Pen: Tofan |

Aussie Stadium, Sydney
Attendance: 33,673
Referee: Chris White (England)

| FB | 15 | Juan Martín Hernández |
| RW | 14 | José María Núñez Piossek |
| OC | 13 | Martín Gaitán |
| IC | 12 | Manuel Contepomi |
| LW | 11 | Hernán Senillosa |
| FH | 10 | Juan Fernández Miranda |
| SH | 9 | Nicolás Fernández Miranda |
| N8 | 8 | Pablo Bouza |
| OF | 7 | Martín Durand |
| BF | 6 | Santiago Phelan (c) |
| RL | 5 | Patricio Albacete |
| LL | 4 | Pedro Sporleder |
| TP | 3 | Martín Scelzo |
| HK | 2 | Mario Ledesma |
| LP | 1 | Rodrigo Roncero |
Replacements:
| HK | 16 | Federico Méndez |
| PR | 17 | Omar Hasan |
| LK | 18 | Rimas Álvarez Kairelis |
| FL | 19 | Rolando Martín |
| SH | 20 | Agustín Pichot |
| FH | 21 | Gonzalo Quesada |
| CE | 22 | José Orengo |
Coach:
Marcelo Loffreda

| FB | 15 | Gabriel Brezoianu |
| RW | 14 | Mihai Vioreanu |
| OC | 13 | Valentin Maftei |
| IC | 12 | Romeo Gontineac (c) |
| LW | 11 | Ion Teodorescu |
| FH | 10 | Ionuț Tofan |
| SH | 9 | Lucian Sîrbu |
| N8 | 8 | George Chiriac |
| OF | 7 | Ovidiu Tonița |
| BF | 6 | Alexandru Tudori |
| RL | 5 | Cristian Petre |
| LL | 4 | Sorin Socol |
| TP | 3 | Silviu Florea |
| HK | 2 | Răzvan Mavrodin |
| LP | 1 | Petrișor Toderașc |
Replacements:
| PR | 16 | Paulică Ion |
| PR | 17 | Cezar Popescu |
| WG | 18 | Vasile Ghioc |
| LK | 19 | Augustin Petrechei |
| FL | 20 | Cornel Tatu |
| SH | 21 | Iulian Andrei |
| WG | 22 | Cristian Săuan |
Coach:
(France) Bernard Charreyre

=== Australia vs Namibia ===
25 October 2003

| Australia | 142–0 | Namibia |
| Try: Latham (5); Lyons; Mortlock; Tuqiri (3); Penalty try Rogers (2); Paul; Giteau (3); Grey; Turinui (2); Burke; Roe; Con: Rogers (16) | Report |

Adelaide Oval, Adelaide
Attendance: 28,196
Referee: Joël Jutge (France)

| FB | 15 | Chris Latham |
| RW | 14 | Lote Tuqiri |
| OC | 13 | Stirling Mortlock |
| IC | 12 | Nathan Grey |
| LW | 11 | Mat Rogers |
| FH | 10 | Matt Giteau |
| SH | 9 | Chris Whitaker |
| N8 | 8 | David Lyons |
| OF | 7 | David Croft |
| BF | 6 | George Smith |
| RL | 5 | Nathan Sharpe |
| LL | 4 | Justin Harrison |
| TP | 3 | Ben Darwin |
| HK | 2 | Jeremy Paul |
| LP | 1 | Matt Dunning |
Replacements:
| HK | 16 | Brendan Cannon |
| PR | 17 | Bill Young |
| LK | 18 | David Giffin |
| N8 | 19 | John Roe |
| FL | 20 | Matt Cockbain |
| CE | 21 | Morgan Turinui |
| FB | 22 | Matt Burke |
Coach:
Eddie Jones

| FB | 15 | Ronaldo Pedro |
| RW | 14 | Deon Mouton |
| OC | 13 | Du Preez Grobler |
| IC | 12 | Emile Wessels |
| LW | 11 | Jurie Booysen |
| FH | 10 | Morné Schreuder |
| SH | 9 | Hakkies Husselman |
| N8 | 8 | Jurgens van Lill |
| OF | 7 | Herman Lintvelt |
| BF | 6 | Shaun van Rooi |
| RL | 5 | Eben Isaacs |
| LL | 4 | Heino Senekal |
| TP | 3 | Niel du Toit |
| HK | 2 | Cor van Tonder |
| LP | 1 | Kees Lensing |
Replacements:
| HK | 16 | Phillipus Isaacs |
| PR | 17 | Andries Blaauw |
| FL | 18 | Schalk van der Merwe |
| FL | 19 | Sean Furter |
| WG | 20 | Niel Swanepoel |
| FB | 21 | Deon Grunschloss |
| WG | 22 | Melrick Africa |
Coach:
(New Zealand) David Waterston

=== Argentina vs Ireland ===
26 October 2003

| Argentina | 15–16 | Ireland |
| Pen: Quesada (3); Drop: Quesada; Corleto | Report | Try: Quinlan; Con: Humphreys; Pen: Humphreys; O'Gara (2) |

Adelaide Oval, Adelaide
Attendance: 30,203
Referee: André Watson (South Africa)

| FB | 15 | Ignacio Corleto |
| RW | 14 | José María Núñez Piossek |
| OC | 13 | José Orengo |
| IC | 12 | Felipe Contepomi |
| LW | 11 | Diego Albanese |
| FH | 10 | Gonzalo Quesada |
| SH | 9 | Agustín Pichot (c) |
| N8 | 8 | Gonzalo Longo |
| OF | 7 | Rolando Martín |
| BF | 6 | Lucas Ostiglia |
| RL | 5 | Rimas Álvarez Kairelis |
| LL | 4 | Ignacio Fernández Lobbe |
| TP | 3 | Mauricio Reggiardo |
| HK | 2 | Federico Méndez |
| LP | 1 | Roberto Diego Grau |
Replacements:
| HK | 16 | Mario Ledesma |
| PR | 17 | Martín Scelzo |
| LK | 18 | Patricio Albacete |
| FL | 19 | Santiago Phelan |
| SH | 20 | Nicolás Fernández Miranda |
| CE | 21 | Martín Gaitán |
| FB | 22 | Juan Martín Hernández |
Coach:
Marcelo Loffreda

| FB | 15 | Girvan Dempsey |
| RW | 14 | Shane Horgan |
| OC | 13 | Brian O'Driscoll |
| IC | 12 | Kevin Maggs |
| LW | 11 | Denis Hickie |
| FH | 10 | David Humphreys |
| SH | 9 | Peter Stringer |
| N8 | 8 | Victor Costello |
| OF | 7 | Alan Quinlan |
| BF | 6 | Simon Easterby |
| RL | 5 | Paul O'Connell |
| LL | 4 | Malcolm O'Kelly |
| TP | 3 | John Hayes (c) |
| HK | 2 | Keith Wood |
| LP | 1 | Reggie Corrigan |
Replacements:
| HK | 16 | Shane Byrne |
| PR | 17 | Marcus Horan |
| LK | 18 | Donncha O'Callaghan |
| N8 | 19 | Eric Miller |
| SH | 20 | Guy Easterby |
| FH | 21 | Ronan O'Gara |
| WG | 22 | John Kelly |
Coach:
Eddie O'Sullivan

=== Namibia vs Romania ===
30 October 2003

| Namibia | 7–37 | Romania |
| Try: Isaacs; Con: Wessels | Report | Try: Petrechei; Sîrbu; Chiriac; Teodorescu; Săuan; Con: Tofan (3); Pen: Tofan (2) |

York Park, Launceston
Attendance: 15,457
Referee: Peter Marshall (Australia)

| FB | 15 | Ronaldo Pedro |
| RW | 14 | Deon Mouton |
| OC | 13 | Du Preez Grobler |
| IC | 12 | Emile Wessels |
| LW | 11 | Vincent Dreyer |
| FH | 10 | Morné Schreuder |
| SH | 9 | Niel Swanepoel |
| N8 | 8 | Sean Furter (c) |
| OF | 7 | Wolfie Duvenhage |
| BF | 6 | Schalk van der Merwe |
| RL | 5 | Eben Isaacs |
| LL | 4 | Heino Senekal |
| TP | 3 | Niel du Toit |
| HK | 2 | Johannes Meyer |
| LP | 1 | Kees Lensing |
Replacements:
| HK | 16 | Cor van Tonder |
| PR | 17 | Andries Blaauw |
| FL | 18 | Herman Lintvelt |
| N8 | 19 | Jurgens van Lill |
| CE | 20 | Rudie van Vuuren |
| FB | 21 | Deon Grunschloss |
| CE | 22 | Corne Powell |
Coach:
(New Zealand) David Waterston

| FB | 15 | Dănuț Dumbravă |
| RW | 14 | Ion Teodorescu |
| OC | 13 | Valentin Maftei |
| IC | 12 | Romeo Gontineac (c) |
| LW | 11 | Gabriel Brezoianu |
| FH | 10 | Ionuț Tofan |
| SH | 9 | Lucian Sîrbu |
| N8 | 8 | Sorin Socol |
| OF | 7 | Ovidiu Tonița |
| BF | 6 | George Chiriac |
| RL | 5 | Cristian Petre |
| LL | 4 | Augustin Petrechei |
| TP | 3 | Marcel Socaciu |
| HK | 2 | Răzvan Mavrodin |
| LP | 1 | Petru Bălan |
Replacements:
| PR | 16 | Cezar Popescu |
| PR | 17 | Petrișor Toderașc |
| PR | 18 | Silviu Florea |
| FL | 19 | Alexandru Tudori |
| SH | 20 | Iulian Andrei |
| WG | 21 | Cristian Săuan |
| CE | 22 | Mihai Vioreanu |
Coach:
(France) Bernard Charreyre

=== Australia vs Ireland ===
1 November 2003

| Australia | 17–16 | Ireland |
| Try: Smith; Pen: Flatley (3); Drop: Gregan | Report | Try: O'Driscoll; Con: O'Gara; Pen: O'Gara (2); Drop: O'Driscoll |

Docklands Stadium, Melbourne
Attendance: 54,206
Referee: Paddy O'Brien (New Zealand)

| FB | 15 | Mat Rogers |
| RW | 14 | Wendell Sailor |
| OC | 13 | Matt Burke |
| IC | 12 | Elton Flatley |
| LW | 11 | Joe Roff |
| FH | 10 | Stephen Larkham |
| SH | 9 | George Gregan (c) |
| N8 | 8 | David Lyons |
| OF | 7 | Phil Waugh |
| BF | 6 | George Smith |
| RL | 5 | Nathan Sharpe |
| LL | 4 | David Giffin |
| TP | 3 | Ben Darwin |
| HK | 2 | Brendan Cannon |
| LP | 1 | Bill Young |
Replacements:
| HK | 16 | Jeremy Paul |
| PR | 17 | Al Baxter |
| LK | 18 | Dan Vickerman |
| FL | 19 | Matt Cockbain |
| SH | 20 | Chris Whitaker |
| FH | 21 | Matt Giteau |
| WG | 22 | Lote Tuqiri |
Coach:
Eddie Jones

| FB | 15 | Girvan Dempsey |
| RW | 14 | Shane Horgan |
| OC | 13 | Brian O'Driscoll |
| IC | 12 | Kevin Maggs |
| LW | 11 | Denis Hickie |
| FH | 10 | Ronan O'Gara |
| SH | 9 | Peter Stringer |
| N8 | 8 | Anthony Foley |
| OF | 7 | Keith Gleeson |
| BF | 6 | Simon Easterby |
| RL | 5 | Paul O'Connell |
| LL | 4 | Malcolm O'Kelly |
| TP | 3 | John Hayes |
| HK | 2 | Keith Wood (c) |
| LP | 1 | Reggie Corrigan |
Replacements:
| HK | 16 | Shane Byrne |
| PR | 17 | Marcus Horan |
| LK | 18 | Donncha O'Callaghan |
| N8 | 19 | Eric Miller |
| SH | 20 | Guy Easterby |
| FH | 21 | David Humphreys |
| WG | 22 | John Kelly |
Coach:
Eddie O'Sullivan
