= 2002 Romania rugby union tour of British Isles =

Summary
P	W	D	L
Total
4	0	0	4
Test match
3	0	0	3
Opponent
P	W	D	L
Ireland
1	0	0	1
Wales
1	0	0	1
Scotland
1	0	0	1

The 2002 Romania rugby union tour of British Isles was a series of matches played in September and November 2002 in Ireland, Scotland and Wales by the Romania national rugby union team. It was a tour in two phases with the first match in September against Ireland, and the remaining three matches in Wales and Scotland during November. After the Irish match Romania played two qualification matches for 2003 Rugby World Cup against Italy and Spain.

== First test: Ireland ==
7 September 2002

Ireland	39–8	Romania
Try: Gleeson; Hayes; Henderson; O'Driscoll; Penalty try Con: O'Gara (3); Pen: O'Gara (2)		Try: Maftei; Pen: Tofan

Thomond Park, Limerick
Attendance: 8,000
Referee: Giulio de Santis (Italy)

Ireland: 15. Girvan Dempsey, 14. John Kelly, 13. Brian O'Driscoll, 12. Kevin Maggs, 11. Denis Hickie, 10. Ronan O'Gara, 9. Peter Stringer, 8. Anthony Foley (c), 7. Keith Gleeson, 6. Simon Easterby, 5. Malcolm O'Kelly, 4. Gary Longwell, 3. John Hayes, 2. Shane Byrne, 1. Reggie Corrigan (yellow card) – Replacements: 17. Paul Wallace, 18. Leo Cullen, 19. Victor Costello, 20. Guy Easterby, 21. David Humphreys, 22. Rob Henderson – Unused: 16. Paul Shields
Romania: 15. Gabriel Brezoianu, 14. Cristian Săuan, 13. Valentin Maftei, 12. Romeo Gontineac (c), 11. Mihai Vioreanu, 10. Ionuț Tofan, 9. Lucian Sîrbu, 8. Alin Petrache (yellow card) , 7. Alex Manta, 6. George Chiriac, 5. Cristian Petre, 4. Marius Dragomir, 3. Marius Țincu (yellow card) , 2. Răzvan Mavrodin, 1. Mihai Dumitru – Replacements: 16. Marius Picoiu, 17. Roland Vusec, 18. Petrișor Toderașc, 19. Dan Tudosa, 20. Augustin Petrechei, 21. Cristian Podea

== Second Test: Wales ==
1 November 2002

Wales	40–3	Romania
Try: M. Jones; Quinnell; G. Thomas; Penalty try Con: N. Jenkins (4); Pen: N. Jenkins (4)		Pen: Tofan

Racecourse Ground, Wrexham
Attendance: 9,448
Referee: Joël Jutge (France)

Wales: 15. Rhys Williams, 14. Mark Jones, 13. Tom Shanklin, 12. Sonny Parker, 11. Gareth Thomas, 10. Neil Jenkins, 9. Dwayne Peel, 8. Scott Quinnell, 7. Colin Charvis (c), 6. Michael Owen, 5. Steve Williams, 4. Robert Sidoli, 3. Martyn Madden, 2. Mefin Davies, 1. Gethin Jenkins – Replacements: 16. Andrew Lewis, 17. Ben Evans, 18. Gareth Llewellyn, 19. Gavin Thomas, 21. Stephen Jones, 22. Craig Morgan – Unused: 20. Ryan Powell
Romania: 15. Dănuț Dumbravă, 14. Vasile Ghioc, 13. Gabriel Brezoianu, 12. Romeo Gontineac (c), 11. Marius Picoiu, 10. Ionuț Tofan, 9. Petre Mitu, 8. Ovidiu Tonița, 7. Alin Petrache (yellow card) , 6. Florin Corodeanu, 5. Cristian Petre, 4. Sorin Socol, 3. Silviu Florea, 2. Răzvan Mavrodin, 1. Petrișor Toderașc – Replacements: 16. Nicolae Dragoș Dima, 17. Marian Constantin, 18. Marcel Socaciu, 19. George Chiriac, 21. Remus Lungu, 22. Marius Coltuneac – Unused: 20. Cristian Podea

== Mid week game against "Scotland A" ==
5 November 2002

Scotland A	21–18	Romania A

Aberdeen

== Third Test: Scotland ==
9 November 2002

Scotland	37–10	Romania
Try: Grimes; Leslie; Moffat; Paterson; Pountney; Con: Laney (3); Pen: Laney (2)		Try: Tofan; Con: Tofan; Pen: Tofan

Murrayfield Stadium, Edinburgh
Attendance: 34,413
Referee: Andy Turner (South Africa)

Scotland: 15. Stuart Moffat, 14. Nikki Walker, 13. Andy Craig, 12. Brendan Laney, 11. Chris Paterson, 10. Gordon Ross, 9. Bryan Redpath (c), 8. Simon Taylor, 7. Budge Pountney, 6. Martin Leslie, 5. Stuart Grimes, 4. Scott Murray, 3. Bruce Douglas, 2. Gordon Bulloch, 1. Tom Smith – Replacements: 16. Steve Scott, 17. Mattie Stewart, 18. Nathan Hines, 19. Jon Petrie, 21. Gregor Townsend, 22. Ben Hinshelwood – Unused: 20. Graeme Beveridge
Romania: 15. Gabriel Brezoianu, 14. Ion Teodorescu, 13. Valentin Maftei, 12. Romeo Gontineac (c), 11. Vasile Ghioc, 10. Ionuț Tofan, 9. Petre Mitu, 8. Alin Petrache, 7. George Chiriac, 6. Florin Corodeanu, 5. Cristian Petre, 4. Augustin Petrechei, 3. Nicolae Dragoș Dima, 2. Marius Țincu, 1. Petru Bălan – Replacements: 16. Petrișor Toderașc, 17. Marcel Socaciu, 18. Stefan Dragnea, 19. Costica Mersoiu, 22. Lucian Sîrbu – Unused: 20. Cristian Podea, 21. Marius Coltuneac
