= Namibia at the Rugby World Cup =

National sports performance

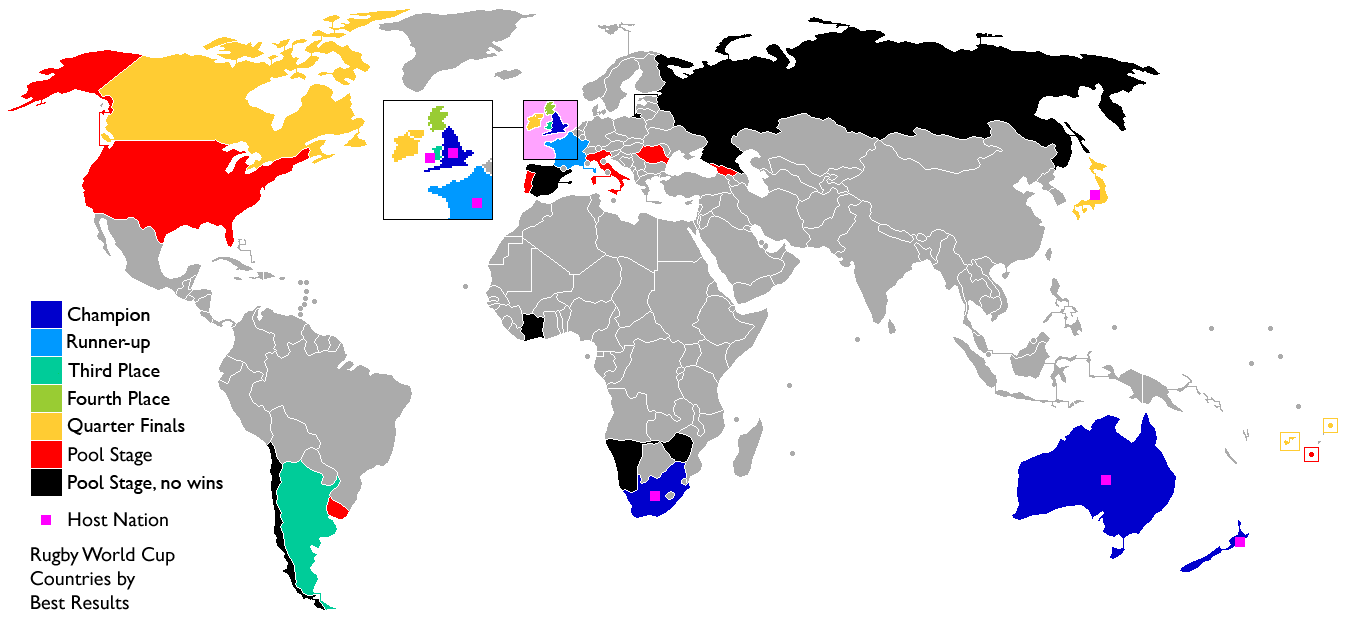
Map of countries' best results

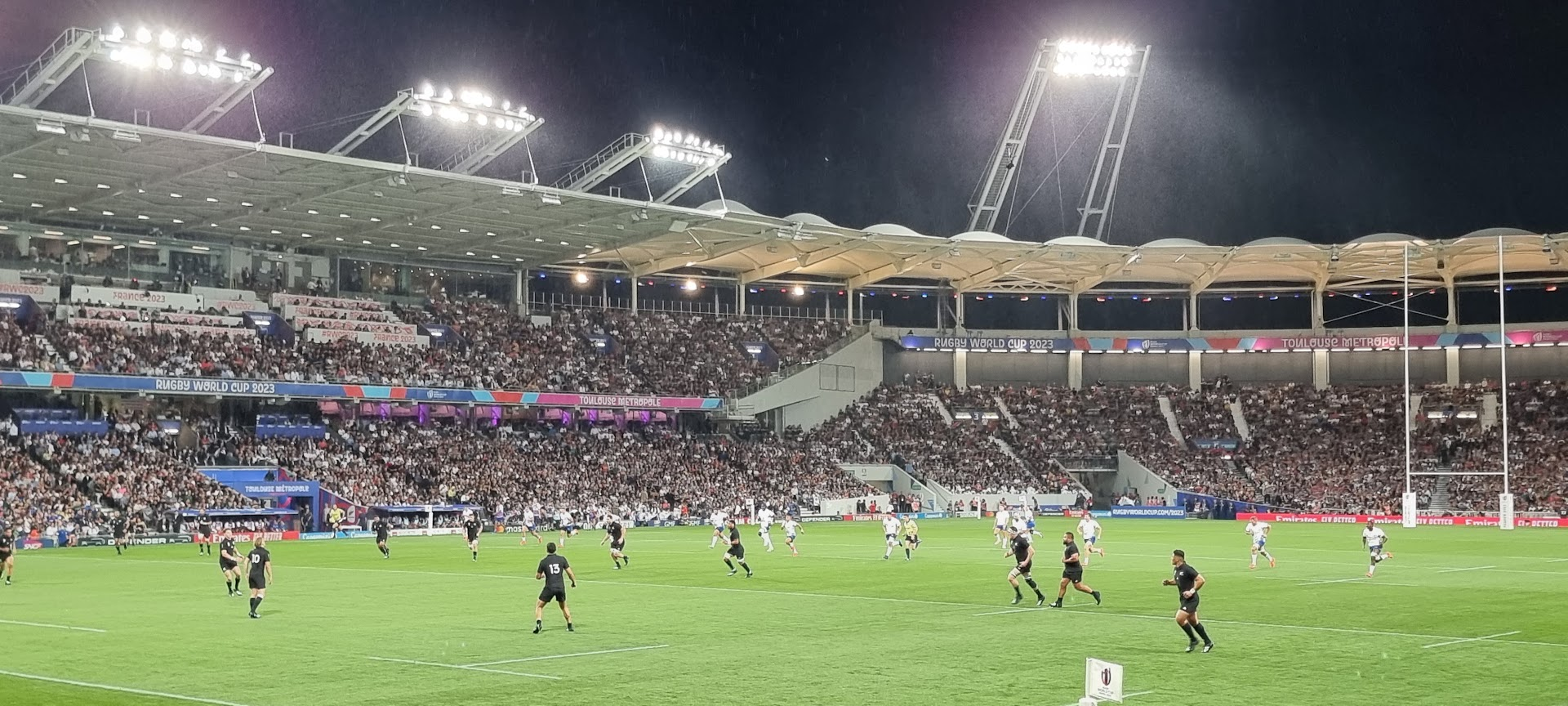
2023 Rugby World Cup match between New Zealand (All Blacks) and Namibia in Toulouse, France.

Namibia has competed in seven Rugby World Cup tournaments, having qualified as the African representative. The Namibian rugby union team, nicknamed the Welwitschias after the Namibian national symbol, made their first appearance at the Rugby World Cup in 1999 and appeared at the following six tournaments. Namibia has so far played 26 games at that cup without ever winning one.

Namibia's best match result was in 2015 when they lost to Georgia by a single point. Namibia's worst match result was in 2003 when they lost to Australia 0-142, which is the record of the biggest winning margin. So far Namibia has not hosted any World Cup games.

== World Cup record ==
Rugby World Cup record										Qualification						
Year	Round	Pld	W	D	L	PF	PA	Squad	Head coach	Pos	Pld	W	D	L	PF	PA
(New Zealand) (Australia) 1987	Part of South Africa: Not an independent country									—						
(England) (France) (Ireland) (Scotland) (Wales) 1991	Did not enter									—						
(South Africa) 1995	Did not qualify									2nd	6	4	1	1	218	104
(Wales) 1999	Pool Stage	3	0	0	3	42	186	Squad	R. Joubert	1st	5	4	0	1	127	78
(Australia) 2003	Pool Stage	4	0	0	4	28	310	Squad	D. Waterston	P/O	4	3	0	1	197	73
(France) 2007	Pool Stage	4	0	0	4	30	212	Squad	H. Husselman	P/O	6	4	0	2	190	96
(New Zealand) 2011	Pool Stage	4	0	0	4	44	266	Squad	J. Diergaardt	P/O	6	5	1	0	155	81
(England) 2015	Pool Stage	4	0	0	4	70	174	Squad	P. Davies	1st	7	5	0	2	289	159
(Japan) 2019	Pool Stage	4	0	1	3	34	175	Squad	P. Davies	1st	10	10	0	0	619	133
(France) 2023	Pool Stage	4	0	0	4	37	255	Squad	A. Coetzee	P/O	5	4	0	1	206	58
(Australia) 2027	To be determined									To be determined						
(United States) 2031	To be determined									To be determined						
Total	—	27	0	1	26	285	1578	—	—	—	49	39	2	8	2001	782
Champions; Runners–up; Third place; Fourth place; Home venue

During Typhoon Hagibis; Canada v Namibia was to be cancelled and recorded as 0–0 draw

== 1999 Rugby World Cup (Pool C) ==
Team	Pld	W	D	L	PF	PA	PD	Pts
France	3	3	0	0	108	52	+56	9
Fiji	3	2	0	1	124	68	+56	7
Canada	3	1	0	2	114	82	+32	5
Namibia	3	0	0	3	42	186	−144	3

1 October 1999

Fiji	67–18	Namibia
Try: Lasagavibau (2); S. Tawake; Rauluni; Satala; Mocelutu; Smith; Tiko; Katalau; Con: Serevi (8); Pen: Serevi (2)		Try: Jacobs; Senekal; Con: Van Dyk; Pen: Van Dyk (2)

Stade de la Méditerranée, Béziers
Referee: David McHugh (Ireland)

8 October 1999

France	47–13	Namibia
Try: Mola (3); Ntamack; Dourthe; Mignoni; Bernat-Salles; Con: Dourthe (4); Pen: Dourthe (3)		Try: Samuelson; Con: Van Dyk; Pen: Van Dyk (2)

Parc Lescure, Bordeaux
Referee: Chris White (England)

14 October 1999

Canada	72–11	Namibia
Try: Stanley (2); Snow (2); Nichols (2); Charron; Ross; Williams; Con: Rees (9); Pen: Rees (3)		Try: Hough; Pen: Van Dyk (2)

Stade de Toulouse
Referee: Andrew Cole (Australia)

== 2003 Rugby World Cup (Pool A) ==
Team	Pld	W	D	L	PF	PA	PD	BP	Pts	Qualification
Australia	4	4	0	0	273	32	+241	2	18	Quarter-finals
Ireland	4	3	0	1	141	56	+85	3	15	Quarter-finals
Argentina	4	2	0	2	140	57	+83	3	11	
Romania	4	1	0	3	65	192	−127	1	5	
Namibia	4	0	0	4	28	310	−282	0	0	

14 October 2003

Argentina	67–14	Namibia
Try: Méndez; Bouza (2); J. Fernández Miranda; Penalty try (2); Gaitán (3); N. Fernández Miranda; Con: Quesada (7); Pen: Quesada		Try: Grobier; Husselman; Con: Wessels (2)

Bluetongue Central Coast Stadium, Gosford
Attendance: 17,887
Referee: Nigel Whitehouse (Wales)

19 October 2003

Ireland	64–7	Namibia
Try: Quinlan (2); Dempsey; Hickie; Horan; Miller (2); G. Easterby; S. Horgan; Kelly; Con: O'Gara (7)		Try: Powell; Con: Wessels

Sydney Football Stadium, Sydney
Attendance: 35,382
Referee: Andrew Cole (Australia)

25 October 2003

Australia	142–0	Namibia
Try: Latham (5); Lyons; Mortlock; Tuqiri (3); Penalty try Rogers (2); Paul; Giteau (3); Grey; Turinui (2); Burke; Roe; Con: Rogers (16)

Adelaide Oval, Adelaide
Attendance: 33,000
Referee: Joël Jutge (France)

30 October 2003

Namibia	7–37	Romania
Try: Isaacs; Con: Wessels		Try: Petrechei; Sîrbu; Chiriac; Teodorescu; Săuan; Con: Tofan (3); Pen: Tofan (2)

Aurora Stadium, Launceston
Attendance: 15,457
Referee: Peter Marshall (Australia)

== 2007 Rugby World Cup (Pool D) ==
Pos	Team	Pld	W	D	L	PF	PA	PD	B	Pts	Qualification
1	Argentina	4	4	0	0	143	33	+110	2	18	Qualified for the quarter-finals
2	France	4	3	0	1	188	37	+151	3	15	Qualified for the quarter-finals
3	Ireland	4	2	0	2	64	82	−18	1	9	Eliminated, automatic qualification for RWC 2011
4	Georgia	4	1	0	3	50	111	−61	1	5	
5	Namibia	4	0	0	4	30	212	−182	0	0	

9 September 2007
20:00

Ireland	32–17	Namibia
Try: O'Driscoll 5' c Trimble 19' m Easterby 30' m Penalty try 49' c Flannery 76' m Con: O'Gara (2/5); Pen: O'Gara (1/1) 17'	Report	Try: Nieuwenhuis 60' c Van Zyl 64' c Con: Wessels (2/2); Pen: Wessels (1/2) 40+'

Stade Chaban-Delmas, Bordeaux
Attendance: 33,694
Referee: Joël Jutge (France)

16 September 2007
21:00

France	87–10	Namibia
Try: Heymans 7' m Marty 11' c Dusautoir 21' c Nallet (2) 32' c, 40+' c Clerc (3) 38' c, 59' c, 65' c Bonnaire 47' c Chabal (2) 49' c, 54' c Élissalde 56' c Ibañez 75' m Con: Élissalde (11/13)	Report	Try: Langenhoven 79' c Con: Losper (1/1); Drop: Wessels (1/1) 10'

Stadium de Toulouse, Toulouse
Attendance: 35,339
Referee: Alain Rolland (Ireland)

22 September 2007
21:00

Argentina	63–3	Namibia
Try: Roncero 25' c Leguizamón (2) 35' m, 52' c M. Contepomi 38' c F. Contepomi 45' c Tiesi 55' m Corleto 58' m Penalty try 63' c Todeschini 71' c Con: Contepomi (4/7); Todeschini (2/2); Pen: F. Contepomi (2/2) 10', 20'	Report	Pen: Schreuder (1/1) 7'

Stade Vélodrome, Marseille
Attendance: 55,067
Referee: Stuart Dickinson (Australia)

26 September 2007
18:00

Georgia	30–0	Namibia
Try: Giorgadze 37' c Machkhaneli 70' c Kacharava 80+' c Con: Kvirikashvili (3/3); Pen: Kvirikashvili (3/6) 8', 26', 69'	Report

Stade Félix Bollaert, Lens
Attendance: 32,549
Referee: Steve Walsh (New Zealand)

== 2011 Rugby World Cup (Pool D) ==
Pos	Team	Pld	W	D	L	PF	PA	PD	T	B	Pts	Qualification
1	South Africa	4	4	0	0	166	24	+142	21	2	18	Advanced to the quarter-finals and qualified for the 2015 Rugby World Cup
2	Wales	4	3	0	1	180	34	+146	23	3	15	Advanced to the quarter-finals and qualified for the 2015 Rugby World Cup
3	Samoa	4	2	0	2	91	49	+42	9	2	10	Eliminated but qualified for 2015 Rugby World Cup
4	Fiji	4	1	0	3	59	167	−108	7	1	5	
5	Namibia	4	0	0	4	44	266	−222	5	0	0	

10 September 2011
15:30

Fiji	49–25	Namibia
Try: Goneva (4) 6' c, 20' m, 40+' c, 51' c Nakarawa 18' c Nalaga 77' c Con: Bai (5/6); Pen: Bai (3/3) 17', 24', 75'	Report	Try: Koll 43' m Botha 56' m Pen: Kotzé (2/3) 4', 37'; Drop: Kotzé (3/3) 11', 13', 15'

Rotorua International Stadium, Rotorua
Attendance: 10,100
Referee: Nigel Owens (Wales)

14 September 2011
14:30

Samoa	49–12	Namibia
Try: Fotuali'i 1' c Tuilagi (3) 17' c, 35' m, 55' c Williams 59' c Penalty try 70' c Con: T. Pisi (2/2); Williams (2/3); Pen: T. Pisi (2/2) 10', 24'; Williams (1/1) 53'	Report	Try: van Wyk 63' m Kotzé 79' c Con: Kotzé (1/2)

Rotorua International Stadium, Rotorua
Attendance: 12,752
Referee: Romain Poite (France)

22 September 2011
20:00

South Africa	87–0	Namibia
Try: Aplon (2) 7' c, 65' c Habana 22' c Penalty try 30' c Fourie 38' c F. Steyn 49' c M. Steyn 61' c De Jongh (2) 63' c, 71' c Hougaard (2) 68' c, 80' c Rossouw 78' c Con: M. Steyn (6/6); Pienaar (6/6); Pen: M. Steyn (1/1) 4'	Report

North Harbour Stadium, Auckland
Attendance: 26,839
Referee: George Clancy (Ireland)

26 September 2011
19:30

Wales	81–7	Namibia
Try: S. Williams (3) 8' m, 47' c, 70' c Brew 14' c Faletau 18' c Jenkins 50' c North (2) 61' c, 66' c J. Davies 62' c L. Williams 75' m Byrne 77' m A. W. Jones 80+' c Con: S. Jones (6/7); Priestland (3/5); Pen: S. Jones (1/1) 3'	Report	Try: Koll 53' c Con: Kotzé (1/1)

Stadium Taranaki, New Plymouth
Attendance: 13,710
Referee: Steve Walsh (Australia)

== 2015 Rugby World Cup (Pool C) ==
Pos	Team	Pld	W	D	L	PF	PA	PD	T	B	Pts	Qualification
1	New Zealand	4	4	0	0	174	49	+125	25	3	19	Advanced to the quarter-finals and qualified for the 2019 Rugby World Cup
2	Argentina	4	3	0	1	179	70	+109	22	3	15	Advanced to the quarter-finals and qualified for the 2019 Rugby World Cup
3	Georgia	4	2	0	2	53	123	−70	5	0	8	Eliminated but qualified for 2019 Rugby World Cup
4	Tonga	4	1	0	3	70	130	−60	8	2	6	
5	Namibia	4	0	0	4	70	174	−104	8	1	1	

24 September 2015
20:00

New Zealand	58–14	Namibia
Try: Vito 6' c Milner-Skudder (2) 10' m, 40' m Fekitoa 21' c Barrett 31' c Savea (2) 47' c, 75' m Smith 61' m Taylor 79' c Con: Barrett (4/8) 7', 21', 32', 80'; Slade (1/1) 48'; Pen: Barrett (1/1) 5'	Report	Try: Deysel 51' m Con: Kotzé (0/1); Pen: Kotzé (3/3) 14', 23', 44'

Olympic Stadium, London
Attendance: 51,820
Referee: Romain Poite (France)

29 September 2015
16:45

Tonga	35–21	Namibia
Try: Veainu (2) 6' c, 55' m Ram (2) 12' m, 45' m Fosita 25' c Con: Lilo (2/5) 7', 26'; Pen: Lilo (1/2) 35'; Morath (1/1) 73'	Report	Try: Tromp 18' c Burger (2) 49' c, 67' c Con: Kotzé (3/3) 19', 49', 68'

Sandy Park, Exeter
Attendance: 10,103
Referee: Glen Jackson (New Zealand)

7 October 2015
20:00

Namibia	16–17	Georgia
Try: Kotzé 74' c Con: Kotzé (1/1) 76'; Pen: Kotzé (3/3) 2', 18', 71'	Report	Try: Gorgodze 50' c Malaghuradze 55' c Con: Kvirikashvili (2/2) 51', 56'; Pen: Kvirikashvili (1/1) 68'

Sandy Park, Exeter
Attendance: 11,156
Referee: George Clancy (Ireland)

11 October 2015
12:00

Argentina	64–19	Namibia
Try: Hernández 7' c Moroni 19' c Agulla 24' c Isa 36' m Noguera Paz 40' c Alemanno 49' c Senatore 64' c Montoya 69' c Cubelli 74' c Con: González Iglesias (4/5) 8', 20', 26', 40'; Socino (4/4) 50', 65', 70', 75'; Pen: González Iglesias (1/2) 12'	Report	Try: Tromp 13' c Greyling 46' c Jantjies 80' m Con: Kotzé (2/2) 14', 47'; Redelinghuys (0/1)

Leicester City Stadium, Leicester
Attendance: 30,198
Referee: Pascal Gaüzère (France)

== 2019 Rugby World Cup (Pool B) ==
Pos	Team	Pld	W	D	L	PF	PA	PD	T	B	Pts	Qualification
1	New Zealand	4	3	1	0	157	22	+135	22	2	16	Advanced to the quarter-finals and qualified for the 2023 Rugby World Cup
2	South Africa	4	3	0	1	185	36	+149	27	3	15	Advanced to the quarter-finals and qualified for the 2023 Rugby World Cup
3	Italy	4	2	1	1	98	78	+20	14	2	12	Eliminated but qualified for 2023 Rugby World Cup
4	Namibia	4	0	1	3	34	175	−141	3	0	2	
5	Canada	4	0	1	3	14	177	−163	2	0	2	

22 September 2019
14:15 JST (UTC+09)

(1 BP) Italy	47–22	Namibia
Try: Penalty try 11'; Allan 26' c Tebaldi 40+1' c Bellini 44' c Canna 47' c Polledri 70' m Minozzi 76' c Con: Allan (3/3) 27', 40+2', 45'; Canna (2/3) 48', 77'	Report	Try: Stevens 6' c Greyling 57' m Plato 79' c Con: Loubser (2/3) 7', 80'; Pen: Loubser (1/1) 51'

Hanazono Rugby Stadium, Higashiōsaka
Attendance: 20,354
Referee: Nic Berry (Australia)

28 September 2019
18:45 JST (UTC+09)

(1 BP) South Africa	57–3	Namibia
Try: Mbonambi (2) 10' c, 17' c Louw 15' m Mapimpi (2) 27' m, 54' c Am 42' c Gelant 48' c Kolisi 59' m Brits 64' c Con: E. Jantjies (6/9) 11', 19', 43', 50', 55', 66'	Report	Pen: Loubser (1/2) 24'

City of Toyota Stadium, Toyota
Attendance: 36,449
Referee: Mathieu Raynal (France)

6 October 2019
13:45 JST (UTC+09)

(1 BP) New Zealand	71–9	Namibia
Try: Reece (2) 6' m, 53' c Lienert-Brown (2) 21' m, 47' c Ta'avao 36' c B. Smith (2) 40+5' c, 68' c Moody 42' m Whitelock 56' c J. Barrett 76' c Perenara 79' m Con: J. Barrett (8/11) 37', 40+6', 44', 48', 53', 57', 69', 77'	Report	Pen: Stevens (3/3) 3', 26', 30'

Tokyo Stadium, Chōfu
Attendance: 48,354
Referee: Pascal Gaüzère (France)

13 October 2019
12:15 JST (UTC+09)

Namibia	0–0 (Cancelled)	Canada

Kamaishi Recovery Memorial Stadium, Kamaishi
Referee: Paul Williams (New Zealand)

Notes:

- Despite both teams naming their sides, this match was cancelled following an evacuation order in Kamaishi during Typhoon Hagibis and awarded as a 0–0 draw.

== 2023 Rugby World Cup (Pool A) ==
Pos	Team	Pld	W	D	L	PF	PA	PD	TF	TA	B	Pts	Qualification
1	France (H)	4	4	0	0	210	32	+178	27	5	2	18	Advance to knockout stage, and qualification to the 2027 Men's Rugby World Cup
2	New Zealand	4	3	0	1	253	47	+206	38	4	3	15	Advance to knockout stage, and qualification to the 2027 Men's Rugby World Cup
3	Italy	4	2	0	2	114	181	−67	15	25	2	10	Qualification to the 2027 Men's Rugby World Cup
4	Uruguay	4	1	0	3	65	164	−99	9	21	1	5	
5	Namibia	4	0	0	4	37	255	−218	3	37	0	0	

Source: World Rugby
Rules for classification: Pool stage tiebreakers
(H) Host

9 September 2023
13:00 CEST (UTC+2)

(1 BP) Italy	52–8	Namibia
Try: L. Cannone 11' c P. Garbisi 15' c Lamb 46' c Capuozzo 55' c Faiva 74' c Zuliani 78' c Odogwu 80+3' c Con: Allan (7/7) 12', 16', 48', 57', 75', 79', 80+4'; Pen: Allan (1/1) 8'	Report	Try: Mouton 21' m Pen: Swanepoel (1/2) 4'

Stade Geoffroy-Guichard, Saint-Étienne
Attendance: 35,515
Referee: Andrew Brace (Ireland)

15 September 2023
21:00 CEST (UTC+2)

(1 BP) New Zealand	71–3	Namibia
Try: Roigard (2) 2' c, 7' m McKenzie (2) 20' c, 39' c Fainga'anuku 25' m Lienert-Brown 35' c De Groot 49' m Papalii 55' c Havili 58' c Clarke 67' c Ioane 77' c Con: McKenzie (8/11) 3', 20', 36', 40', 55', 59', 68', 78'	Report	Pen: Swanepoel (1/1) 11'

Stadium de Toulouse, Toulouse
Attendance: 31,996
Referee: Luke Pearce (England)

21 September 2023
21:00 CEST (UTC+2)

(1 BP) France	96–0	Namibia
Try: Penaud (3) 6' m, 21' c, 55' c Danty (2) 9' c, 26' c Ollivon (2) 18' c, 68' c Flament 33' c Dupont 38' c Bielle-Biarrey (2) 40+1' c, 64' c Couilloud 47' c Jaminet 76' c Penalty try 80'; Con: Ramos (12/13) 10', 18', 22', 27', 34', 39', 40+2', 48', 56', 65', 70', 77'	Report

Stade de Marseille, Marseille
Attendance: 63,486
Referee: Matthew Carley (England)

27 September 2023
17:45 CEST (UTC+2)

(1 BP) Uruguay	36–26	Namibia
Try: Amaya (2) 19' m, 49' c Kessler 28' c Arata 54' c Basso 66' c Con: Etcheverry (3/4) 29', 51', 55'; Berchesi (1/1) 67'; Pen: Berchesi (1/1) 74'	Report	Try: Mouton 1' c Greyling 11' c Con: Swanepoel (2/2) 2', 12'; Pen: Swanepoel (4/4) 25', 35', 43', 69'

Parc Olympique Lyonnais, Décines-Charpieu
Attendance: 49,342
Referee: Mathieu Raynal (France)

== Overall record ==
Up to date as of 2023 World Cup

Namibia vs	Played	Win	Draw	Lost	Win %
Argentina	3	0	0	3	0%
Australia	1	0	0	1	0%
Canada	2	0	1	1	0%
Fiji	2	0	0	2	0%
France	3	0	0	3	0%
Georgia	2	0	0	2	0%
Ireland	2	0	0	2	0%
Italy	2	0	0	2	0%
New Zealand	3	0	0	3	0%
Romania	1	0	0	1	0%
Samoa	1	0	0	1	0%
South Africa	2	0	0	2	0%
Tonga	1	0	0	1	0%
Uruguay	1	0	0	1	0%
Wales	1	0	0	1	0%
Overall	27	0	1	26	0%

Notes:

- The table above excludes the awarded 0–0 draw against Canada during the 2019 World Cup following the cancellation of the match due to Typhoon Hagibis.

== Team records ==
Most points in a game

- 26 vs Uruguay (2023)
- 25 vs Fiji (2011)
- 22 vs Italy (2019)
- 21 vs Tonga (2015)
- 19 vs Argentina (2015)

Biggest winning margin

- Never won a match.

Most tries in a game

- 3 vs Tonga (2015)
- 3 vs Argentina (2015)
- 3 vs Italy (2019)
- 2 vs Fiji (1999)
- 2 vs Argentina (2003)
- 2 vs Ireland (2007)
- 2 vs Fiji (2011)
- 2 vs Samoa (2011)
- 2 vs Uruguay (2011)

Highest score against

- 142 vs Australia (2003)
- 96 vs France (2023)
- 87 vs France (2007)
- 87 vs South Africa (2011)
- 81 vs Wales (2011)

Biggest losing margin

- 142 vs Australia (2003)
- 96 vs France (2023)
- 87 vs South Africa (2011)
- 77 vs France (2007)
- 74 vs Wales (2011)

Most tries against

- 22 vs Australia (2003)
- 14 vs France (2023)
- 13 vs France (2007)
- 12 vs South Africa (2011)
- 12 vs Wales (2011)

== Individual records ==
Most appearances overall

- 14 Eugene Jantjies
- 12 PJ van Lill
- 11 Jacques Burger
- 11 Aranos Coetzee
- 11 Tinus du Plessis
- 11 Hugo Horn
- 11 Johnny Redelinghuys

Most points overall

- 59 Theuns Kotzé
- 22 Tiaan Swanepoel
- 22 Leandre van Dyk
- 18 Emile Wessels
- 15 JC Greyling

Most points in a match

- 16 Theuns Kotzé vs Georgia (2015)
- 16 Tiaan Swanepoel vs Uruguay (2023)
- 15 Theuns Kotzé vs Fiji (2011)
- 10 Jacques Burger vs Tonga (2015)
- 9 Theuns Kotzé vs New Zealand (2015)
- 9 Damian Stevens vs New Zealand (2019)

Most tries overall

- 3 JC Greyling
- 2 Jacques Burger
- 2 Heinz Koll
- 2 Theuns Kotzé
- 2 Gerswin Mouton
- 2 Johann Tromp

Most penalty goals overall

- 8 Theuns Kotzé
- 6 Tiaan Swanepoel
- 6 Leandre van Dyk
- 3 Damian Stevens
- 2 Cliven Loubser
- 1 Morné Schreuder
- 1 Emile Wessels
