= Romania at the Rugby World Cup =

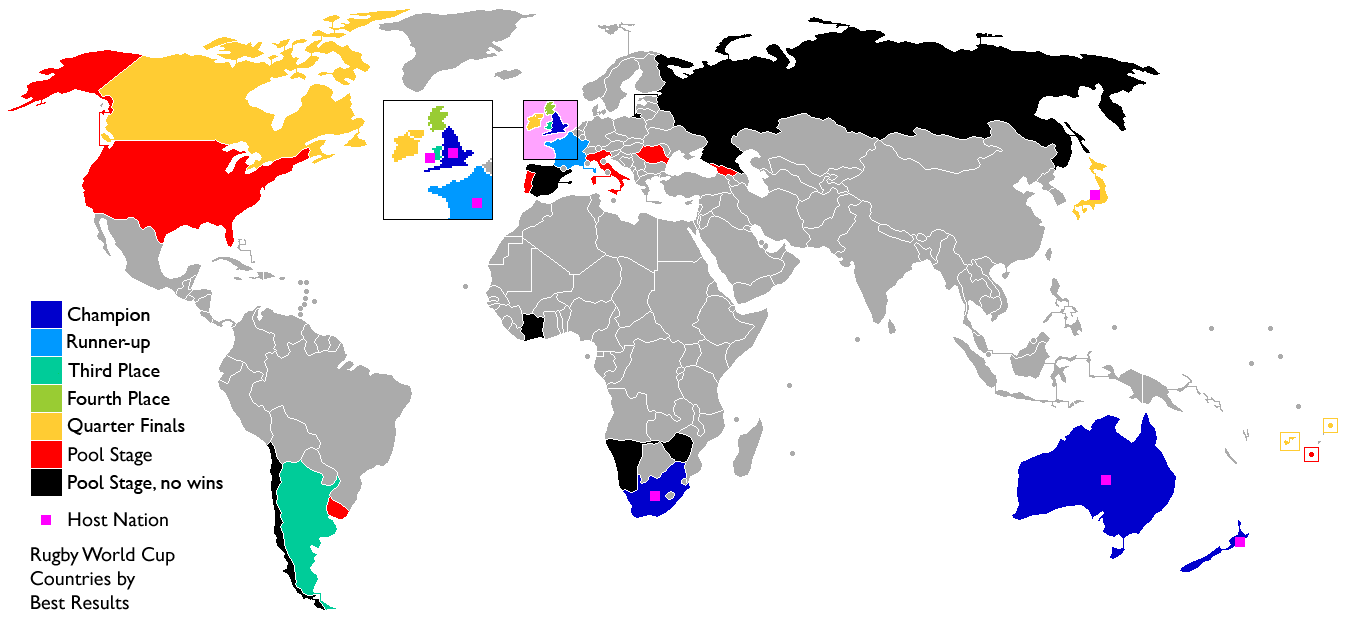
Map of nations best results, excluding nations which unsuccessfully participated in qualifying tournaments.

Romania played in the first eight editions of the Rugby World Cup including the inaugural tournament in 1987. They originally qualified for the ninth edition of the Rugby World Cup to be played in 2019. In 2018, after it was discovered that Romania were one of three countries guilty of fielding ineligible players in multiple qualifiers, they received a points deduction. The points deduction meant Romania did not qualify for the 2019 Rugby World Cup.

== Summary ==
| Nation | Number of appearances | First appearance | Most recent appearance | Streak | Best result |
|---|---|---|---|---|---|
| Romania | 9 | 1987 | 2023 | 8 | One win, 1987, 1991, 1999, 2003, 2007, 2015 |

| Rugby World Cup record | | | | | | | | | | Qualification | | | | | | |
| Year | Round | Pld | W | D | L | PF | PA | Squad | Head coach | Pos | Pld | W | D | L | PF | PA |
|---|---|---|---|---|---|---|---|---|---|---|---|---|---|---|---|---|
| (New Zealand) (Australia) 1987 | Pool stage | 3 | 1 | 0 | 2 | 61 | 130 | Squad | M. Naca | Invited | | | | | | |
| (England) (France) (Ireland) (Scotland) (Wales) 1991 | Pool stage | 3 | 1 | 0 | 2 | 31 | 64 | Squad | P. Ianusevici | 2nd | 3 | 2 | 0 | 1 | 85 | 42 |
| (South Africa) 1995 | Pool stage | 3 | 0 | 0 | 3 | 14 | 97 | Squad | M. Paraschiv | 3rd | 4 | 2 | 0 | 2 | 105 | 46 |
| (Wales) 1999 | Pool stage | 3 | 1 | 0 | 2 | 50 | 126 | Squad | M. Paraschiv | 2nd | 6 | 4 | 0 | 2 | 300 | 127 |
| (Australia) 2003 | Pool stage | 4 | 1 | 0 | 3 | 65 | 192 | Squad | B. Charreyre | 2nd | 2 | 1 | 0 | 1 | 84 | 31 |
| (France) 2007 | Pool stage | 4 | 1 | 0 | 3 | 40 | 161 | Squad | D. Santamans | 1st | 12 | 10 | 0 | 2 | 452 | 122 |
| (New Zealand) 2011 | Pool stage | 4 | 0 | 0 | 4 | 44 | 169 | Squad | R. Gontineac | P/O | 12 | 8 | 1 | 3 | 376 | 142 |
| (England) 2015 | Pool stage | 4 | 1 | 0 | 3 | 60 | 129 | Squad | L. Howells | 2nd | 10 | 8 | 1 | 1 | 242 | 106 |
| (Japan) 2019 | Expelled from competing at tournament after qualification | | | | | | | | | 3rd | 8 | 6 | 0 | 2 | 296 | 106 |
| (France) 2023 | Pool stage | 4 | 0 | 0 | 4 | 32 | 287 | Squad | E. Apjok | 2nd | 10 | 6 | 0 | 4 | 289 | 232 |
| (Australia) 2027 | Qualified | | | | | | | | | 2nd | 3 | 2 | 0 | 1 | 85 | 58 |
| (United States) 2031 | To be determined | | | | | | | | | To be determined | | | | | | |
| Total | — | 32 | 6 | 0 | 26 | 397 | 1355 | — | — | — | 70 | 49 | 2 | 19 | 2314 | 1012 |
Champions; Runners–up; Third place; Fourth place; Home venue

== By match ==
=== 1987 ===
| Team | Pld | W | D | L | PF | PA | PD | T | Pts | Qualification |
|---|---|---|---|---|---|---|---|---|---|---|
| France | 3 | 2 | 1 | 0 | 145 | 44 | +101 | 25 | 5 (Note: France qualify as pool winner having scored three tries to Scotland's two in their drawn match.) | Knockout stage |
| Scotland | 3 | 2 | 1 | 0 | 135 | 69 | +66 | 22 | 5 | Knockout stage |
| Romania | 3 | 1 | 0 | 2 | 61 | 130 | −69 | 6 | 2 | |
| Zimbabwe | 3 | 0 | 0 | 3 | 53 | 151 | −98 | 5 | 0 | |

Notes:

23 May 1987

| Romania | 21–20 | Zimbabwe |
| Try: Paraschiv; Toader; Hodorcă; Pen: Alexandru (3) | | Try: Tsimba (2); Neill; Con: Ferreira; Pen: Ferreira (2) |

Eden Park, Auckland
Attendance: 4,500
Referee: Stephen Hilditch (Ireland)

28 May 1987

| France | 55–12 | Romania |
| Try: Lagisquet (2); Charvet (2); Sella; Andrieu; Camberabero; Erbani; Laporte; Con: Laporte (8); Pen: Laporte | | Pen: Bezuscu (4) |

Athletic Park, Wellington
Attendance: 7,000
Referee: Bob Fordham (Australia)

2 June 1987

| Romania | 28–55 | Scotland |
| Try: Murariu (2); Toader; Con: Alexandru; Ion; Pen: Alexandru (3); Ion | | Try: Jeffrey (3); Tait (2); Hastings (2); Duncan; Tukalo; Con: Hastings (8); Pen: Hastings |

Carisbrook, Dunedin
Attendance: 14,000
Referee: Stephen Hilditch (Ireland)

=== 1991 ===
| Team | Pld | W | D | L | PF | PA | PD | Pts |
|---|---|---|---|---|---|---|---|---|
| France | 3 | 3 | 0 | 0 | 82 | 25 | +57 | 6 |
| Canada | 3 | 2 | 0 | 1 | 45 | 33 | +12 | 4 |
| Romania | 3 | 1 | 0 | 2 | 31 | 64 | −33 | 2 |
| Fiji | 3 | 0 | 0 | 3 | 27 | 63 | −36 | 0 |

4 October 1991

| France | 30–3 | Romania |
| Try: Roumat; Lafond; Penalty try Saint-André; Con: Camberabero; Pen: Camberabero (4) | | Pen: Nichitean |

Stade de la Méditerranée, Béziers
Referee: Les Peard (Wales)

9 October 1991

| Canada | 19–11 | Romania |
| Try: McKinnon; Ennis; Con: Mark Wyatt; Pen: Wyatt (2); Drop: Rees | | Try: Lungu; Sasu; Pen: Nichitean |

Stade Ernest-Wallon, Toulouse
Referee: Sandy MacNeill (Australia)

12 October 1991

| Fiji | 15–17 | Romania |
| Pen: Turuva (2); Drop: Rabaka (2); Turuva | | Try: Ion; Dumitras; Sasu; Con: Racean; Pen: Nichitean |

Parc Municipal des Sports, Brive
Referee: Owen Doyle (Ireland)

=== 1995 Rugby World Cup ===
| Team | Pld | W | D | L | PF | PA | PD | Pts |
|---|---|---|---|---|---|---|---|---|
| South Africa | 3 | 3 | 0 | 0 | 68 | 26 | +42 | 9 |
| Australia | 3 | 2 | 0 | 1 | 87 | 41 | +46 | 7 |
| Canada | 3 | 1 | 0 | 2 | 45 | 50 | −5 | 5 |
| Romania | 3 | 0 | 0 | 3 | 14 | 97 | −83 | 3 |

26 May 1995

| Canada | 34–3 | Romania |
| Try: Charron; McKenzie; Snow; Con: Rees (2); Pen: Rees (4) | | Pen: Neculai Nichitean |

Boet Erasmus Stadium, Port Elizabeth
Attendance: 18,000
Referee: Colin Hawke (New Zealand)

30 May 1995

| South Africa | 21–8 | Romania |
| Try: Adriaan Richter (2); Con: Gavin Johnson; Pen: Gavin Johnson (3) | | Try: Andrei Gurănescu; Pen: Ilie Ivanciuc |

Newlands Stadium, Cape Town
Attendance: 35,000
Referee: Ken McCartney (Scotland)

3 June 1995

| Australia | 42–3 | Romania |
| Try: Smith; Wilson; Roff; Foley; Burke; Con: Matt Burke (2); John Eales (4) | | Pen: Ilie Ivanciuc |

Danie Craven Stadium, Stellenbosch
Attendance: 15,000
Referee: Naoki Saito (Japan)

=== 1999 ===
| Team | Pld | W | D | L | PF | PA | PD | Pts |
|---|---|---|---|---|---|---|---|---|
| Australia | 3 | 3 | 0 | 0 | 135 | 31 | +104 | 9 |
| Ireland | 3 | 2 | 0 | 1 | 100 | 45 | +55 | 7 |
| Romania | 3 | 1 | 0 | 2 | 50 | 126 | −76 | 5 |
| United States | 3 | 0 | 0 | 3 | 52 | 135 | −83 | 3 |

3 October 1999

| Australia | 57–9 | Romania |
| Try: Kefu (3); Roff (2); Kafer; Burke; Little; Horan; Con: Burke (5); Eales | | Pen: Mitu (3) |

Ravenhill Stadium, Belfast
Referee: Paul Honiss (New Zealand)

9 October 1999

| United States | 25–27 | Romania |
| Try: Shuman; Hightower; Lyle; Con: Dalzell (2); Pen: Dalzell (2) | | Try: Petrache; Solomie; Constantin; Con: Mitu (2); Pen: Mitu |

Lansdowne Road, Dublin
Referee: Jim Fleming (Scotland)

15 October 1999

| Ireland | 44–14 | Romania |
| Try: O'Shea (2); Ward; Tierney; O'Cuinneagain; Con: Elwood (5); Pen: Elwood (2); Drop: O'Driscoll | | Try: Săuan; Pen: Mitu (3) |

Lansdowne Road, Dublin
Referee: Brian Campsell (England)

=== 2003 ===
| Team | Pld | W | D | L | PF | PA | PD | BP | Pts | Qualification |
|---|---|---|---|---|---|---|---|---|---|---|
| Australia | 4 | 4 | 0 | 0 | 273 | 32 | +241 | 2 | 18 | Quarter-finals |
| Ireland | 4 | 3 | 0 | 1 | 141 | 56 | +85 | 3 | 15 | Quarter-finals |
| Argentina | 4 | 2 | 0 | 2 | 140 | 57 | +83 | 3 | 11 | |
| Romania | 4 | 1 | 0 | 3 | 65 | 192 | −127 | 1 | 5 | |
| Namibia | 4 | 0 | 0 | 4 | 28 | 310 | −282 | 0 | 0 | |

11 October 2003

| Ireland | 45–17 | Romania |
| Try: S. Horgan; Wood; Hickie (2); Costello; Con: Humphreys (3); O'Gara; Pen: Humphreys (4) | | Try: Penalty try Maftei; Con: Tofan; Vioreanu; Pen: Tofan |

Bluetongue Central Coast Stadium, Gosford
Attendance: 19,123
Referee: Jonathan Kaplan (South Africa)

18 October 2003

| Australia | 90–8 | Romania |
| Try: Flatley; Rogers (3); Burke (2); Larkham (2); Mortlock; Roff; Giteau; Tuqiri; Smith; Con: Flatley (11); Pen: Flatley | | Try: Toderașc; Pen: Tofan |

Suncorp Stadium, Brisbane
Attendance: 48,778
Referee: Pablo De Luca (Argentina)

22 October 2003

| Argentina | 50–3 | Romania |
| Try: Gaitán; Hernández (2); M. Contepomi; N. Fernández Miranda; Bouza (2); Con: J. Fernández Miranda (4); Quesada (2); Pen: J. Fernández Miranda | | Pen: Tofan |

Sydney Football Stadium, Sydney
Attendance: 33,673
Referee: Chris White (England)

30 October 2003

| Namibia | 7–37 | Romania |
| Try: Isaacs; Con: Wessels | | Try: Petrechei; Sîrbu; Chiriac; Teodorescu; Săuan; Con: Tofan (3); Pen: Tofan (2) |

Aurora Stadium, Launceston
Attendance: 15,457
Referee: Peter Marshall (Australia)

=== 2007 ===
| Pos | Team | Pld | W | D | L | PF | PA | PD | B | Pts | Qualification |
|---|---|---|---|---|---|---|---|---|---|---|---|
| 1 | New Zealand | 4 | 4 | 0 | 0 | 309 | 35 | +274 | 4 | 20 | Qualified for the quarter-finals |
| 2 | Scotland | 4 | 3 | 0 | 1 | 116 | 66 | +50 | 2 | 14 | Qualified for the quarter-finals |
| 3 | Italy | 4 | 2 | 0 | 2 | 85 | 117 | −32 | 1 | 9 | Eliminated, automatic qualification for RWC 2011 |
| 4 | Romania | 4 | 1 | 0 | 3 | 40 | 161 | −121 | 1 | 5 | |
| 5 | Portugal | 4 | 0 | 0 | 4 | 38 | 209 | −171 | 1 | 1 | |

12 September 2007
20:00

| Italy | 24–18 | Romania |
| Try: Dellapè 6' m Penalty try 55' c Con: Pez (1/1); Pen: Bortolussi (1/2) 14'; Ramiro Pez (3/3) 62', 66', 72' | Report | Try: Manta 43' m Țincu 47' c Con: Dimofte (1/1); Pen: Dimofte (2/2) 70', 74' |

Stade Vélodrome, Marseille
Attendance: 44,241
Referee: Tony Spreadbury (England)

18 September 2007
21:00

| Scotland | 42–0 | Romania |
| Try: Paterson 2' c Hogg (3) 17' c, 46' c, 53' c R. Lamont (2) 36' c, 72' c Con: Paterson (6/6) | Report |

Murrayfield Stadium, Edinburgh
Attendance: 31,222
Referee: Nigel Owens (Wales)

25 September 2007
20:00

| Romania | 14–10 | Portugal |
| Try: Țincu 63' c Corodeanu 72' c Con: Calafeteanu (1/1); Dumbravă (1/1) | Report | Try: Ferreira 18' c Con: D. Pinto (1/1); Pen: Malheiro (1/1) 69' |

Stadium de Toulouse, Toulouse
Attendance: 35,526
Referee: Paul Honiss (New Zealand)

29 September 2007
13:00

| New Zealand | 85–8 | Romania |
| Try: Sivivatu (2) 1' m, 24' c Masoe 10' c Rokocoko (3) 15' c, 58' c, 66' c Evans 18' m Mauger 37' m Toeava (2) 47' c, 80+' c Hore 64' c Smith 75' c Howlett 79' c Con: McAlister (4/7); Evans (6/6) | Report | Try: Țincu 31' m Pen: Vlaicu 72' |

Stadium de Toulouse, Toulouse
Attendance: 35,608
Referee: Joël Jutge (France)

=== 2011 ===
| Pos | Team | Pld | W | D | L | PF | PA | PD | T | B | Pts | Qualification |
|---|---|---|---|---|---|---|---|---|---|---|---|---|
| 1 | England | 4 | 4 | 0 | 0 | 137 | 34 | +103 | 18 | 2 | 18 | Advanced to the quarter-finals and qualified for the 2015 Rugby World Cup |
| 2 | Argentina | 4 | 3 | 0 | 1 | 90 | 40 | +50 | 10 | 2 | 14 | Advanced to the quarter-finals and qualified for the 2015 Rugby World Cup |
| 3 | Scotland | 4 | 2 | 0 | 2 | 73 | 59 | +14 | 4 | 3 | 11 | Eliminated but qualified for 2015 Rugby World Cup |
| 4 | Georgia | 4 | 1 | 0 | 3 | 48 | 90 | −42 | 3 | 0 | 4 | |
| 5 | Romania | 4 | 0 | 0 | 4 | 44 | 169 | −125 | 3 | 0 | 0 | |

| 10 September 2011 | Scotland | 34–24 | Romania | Rugby Park Stadium, Invercargill |
| 17 September 2011 | Argentina | 43–8 | Romania | Rugby Park Stadium, Invercargill |
| 24 September 2011 | England | 67–3 | Romania | Forsyth Barr Stadium, Dunedin |
| 28 September 2011 | Georgia | 25–9 | Romania | Arena Manawatu, Palmerston North |

=== 2015 ===
| Pos | Team | Pld | W | D | L | PF | PA | PD | T | B | Pts | Qualification |
|---|---|---|---|---|---|---|---|---|---|---|---|---|
| 1 | Ireland | 4 | 4 | 0 | 0 | 134 | 35 | +99 | 16 | 2 | 18 | Advanced to the quarter-finals and qualified for the 2019 Rugby World Cup |
| 2 | France | 4 | 3 | 0 | 1 | 120 | 63 | +57 | 12 | 2 | 14 | Advanced to the quarter-finals and qualified for the 2019 Rugby World Cup |
| 3 | Italy | 4 | 2 | 0 | 2 | 74 | 88 | −14 | 7 | 2 | 10 | Eliminated but qualified for 2019 Rugby World Cup |
| 4 | Romania | 4 | 1 | 0 | 3 | 60 | 129 | −69 | 7 | 0 | 4 | |
| 5 | Canada | 4 | 0 | 0 | 4 | 58 | 131 | −73 | 7 | 2 | 2 | |

| 23 September 2015 | France | 38–11 | Romania | Olympic Stadium, London |
| 27 September 2015 | Ireland | 44–10 | Romania | Wembley Stadium, London |
| 6 October 2015 | Canada | 15–17 | Romania | Leicester City Stadium, Leicester |
| 11 October 2015 | Italy | 32–22 | Romania | Sandy Park, Exeter |

=== 2023 ===
| Pos | Team | Pld | W | D | L | PF | PA | PD | TF | TA | B | Pts | Qualification |
|---|---|---|---|---|---|---|---|---|---|---|---|---|---|
| 1 | Ireland | 4 | 4 | 0 | 0 | 190 | 46 | +144 | 27 | 5 | 3 | 19 | Advance to knockout stage, and qualification to the 2027 Men's Rugby World Cup |
| 2 | South Africa | 4 | 3 | 0 | 1 | 151 | 34 | +117 | 22 | 4 | 3 | 15 | Advance to knockout stage, and qualification to the 2027 Men's Rugby World Cup |
| 3 | Scotland | 4 | 2 | 0 | 2 | 146 | 71 | +75 | 21 | 10 | 2 | 10 | Qualification to the 2027 Men's Rugby World Cup |
| 4 | Tonga | 4 | 1 | 0 | 3 | 96 | 177 | −81 | 13 | 25 | 1 | 5 | |
| 5 | Romania | 4 | 0 | 0 | 4 | 32 | 287 | −255 | 4 | 43 | 0 | 0 | |

Source: World Rugby
Rules for classification: Pool stage tiebreakers

9 September 2023
15:30 CEST (UTC+2)

| (1 BP) Ireland | 82–8 | Romania |
| Try: Gibson-Park 5' c Keenan 13' c Beirne (2) 17' m, 80+3' c Aki (2) 34' c, 75' c Sexton (2) 40' c, 62' c Herring 45' c O'Mahony (2) 50' c, 70' c McCarthy 67' c Con: Sexton (7/8) 6', 13', 36', 40', 46', 51', 63'; Crowley (4/4) 68', 72', 76', 80+3' | Report | Try: Rupanu 3' m Pen: Rupanu (1/1) 21' |

Stade de Bordeaux, Bordeaux
Attendance: 41,170
Referee: Nika Amashukeli (Georgia)

17 September 2023
15:00 CEST (UTC+2)

| (1 BP) South Africa | 76–0 | Romania |
| Try: Reinach (3) 2' m, 8' c, 23' c Mapimpi (3) 6' c, 63' m, 67' c Willemse 11' c Fourie 42' m Penalty try 52'; Williams (2) 54' c, 61' c Le Roux 73' m Con: Willemse (5/7) 7', 9', 11', 24', 55'; De Klerk (2/4) 62', 68' | Report |

Stade de Bordeaux, Bordeaux
Attendance: 38,789
Referee: Mathieu Raynal (France)

30 September 2023
21:00 CEST (UTC+2)

| (1 BP) Scotland | 84–0 | Romania |
| Try: Watson 9' c Price 17' c Graham (4) 21' c, 34' c, 40' c, 77' c Fagerson 38' c Harris 45' c Smith 53' c Healy 58' c Matthews 71' c Darge 73' c Con: Healy (11/11) 10', 18', 22', 35', 39', 40', 47', 55', 59', 72', 77'; Horne (1/1) 73' | Report |

Stade Pierre-Mauroy, Villeneuve-d'Ascq
Attendance: 46,516
Referee: Wayne Barnes (England)

8 October 2023
17:45 CEST (UTC+2)

| (1 BP) Tonga | 45–24 | Romania |
| Try: Kata (2) 11' c, 66' m Moala 15' c Taumoepeau 22' c Vailanu 49' c Ahki 62' c Taumoefolau 71' m Con: Havili (5/7) 13', 17', 23', 51', 63' | Report | Try: Boboc 30' c Surugiu 36' c Simionescu 55' c Con: Conache (3/3) 32', 37', 57'; Pen: Conache (1/2) 19' |

Stade Pierre-Mauroy, Villeneuve-d'Ascq
Attendance: 45,042
Referee: Angus Gardner (Australia)
