= 2003 Samoa rugby union tour of Africa =

Summary
P	W	D	L
Total
1	1	0	0
Test match
4	2	0	2
Opponent
P	W	D	L
Namibia
1	1	0	0

The 2003 Samoa rugby union tour of Austral Africa was a series of matches played in July 2003 in Namibia and South Africa by Samoa national rugby union team, to prepare the 2003 Rugby World Cup.

The Samoans played three match against South African provincial teams and one test match against Namibia.

2 July 2003

Orange Free State	51–45	Western Samoa XV

Bloemfontein

6 July 2003

Gauteng Lions	32–34	Western Samoa XV

Johannesburg

8 July 2003

Pumas	35–29	Western Samoa XV

Witbank

12 July 2003

Namibia	13–40	Western Samoa
Try: Duvenhage, Grobler; Pen: Wessels		Try: Feau'nati 3, Lima; Tagicakibau; Con: Va'a 3 Pen: Va'a 3

Windhoek
Referee: A. Rolland (Ireland)

Namibia: Jurie Booysen, 14.Riaan van Wyk, 13.Du Preez Grobler, 12.Corne Powell (capt), 11.Melrick Afrika, 10.Emile Wessels, 9.Hakkies Husselman, 8.Kees Lensing, 7.Hugo Horn, 6.Niel du Toit, 5.Heino Senekal, 4.Wolfie Duvenhage, 3.Eben Isaacs (yellow card) , 2.Schalk van der Merwe, 1.Sean Furter, – replacements: 16.Cor van Tonder, 17.Herman Lintvelt, 18.Jurgens van Lill, 19.Ronaldo Pedro (yellow card) , 20.Mot Schreuder, 21.Deon Mouton – No entry : 22.Johan Jenkins
Samoa: 15.Fa'atonu Fili, 14.Sailosi Tagicakibau, 13.Terry Fanolua, 12.Brian Lima, 11.Dom Feau'nati, 10.Earl Va'a, 9.Steve So'oialo, 8.Semo Sititi (capt), 7.Maurie Fa'asavalu, 6.Des Tuiavi'i, 5.Leo Lafaiali'i, 4.Opeta Palepoi, 3.Jeremy Tomuli, 2.Jonathan Meredith, 1.Kas Lealamanua, – replacements: 16.Denning Tyrell, 17.Mahonri Schwalger, 18.Tamato Leupolu (yellow card) , 19.Pama Petia, 20.Dale Rasmussen, 21.Gaolo Elisara
