= 2006 France rugby union tour of Romania and South Africa =

- Manager: Bernard Laporte
- Tour captain: Fabien Pelous
Summary
P	W	D	L
Total
2	2	0	0
Test match
2	2	0	0
Opponent
P	W	D	L
Romania
1	1	0	0
South Africa
1	1	0	0

Tour chronology
- ← South Africa & Australia 2005 New Zealand 2007 →

The 2006 France rugby union tour of Romania and South Africa was a series of matches played in June 2006 in Romania and South Africa by France national rugby union team.

== Results ==
17 June 2006

Romania	14–62	France
Try: Fercu; Pen: Vlaicu 3		Try: Jauzion, Laharrague; Castaignède, Dusautoir; Marconnet, Martin; Marty, Szarzewski, Traille; Con: Castaignède, Traille 6 Pen: Traille

Cotroceni Stadium, Bucharest
Attendance: 8,000
Referee: Bryce Lawrence (New Zealand)

Romania: 15. Florin Vlaicu, 14. Cătălin Fercu, 13. Catalin Dascalu, 12. Romeo Gontineac, 11. Ion Teodorescu, 10. Ionuț Dimofte, 9. Lucian Sîrbu, 8. Cosmin Rațiu, 7. Alex Tudori, 6. Stelian Burcea, 5. Cristian Petre, 4. Sorin Socol (c), 3. Bogdan Bălan, 2. Marius Țincu, 1. Petru Bălan – Replacements: 16. Cezar Popescu, 17. Paulică Ion, 18. Răzvan Mavrodin, 19. Valentin Ursache, 20. Valentin Calafeteanu, 21. Gabriel Brezoianu, 22. Iulian Dumitraș
France: 15. Clément Poitrenaud, 14. Philippe Bidabé, 13. Yannick Jauzion, 12. Damien Traille, 11. Cédric Heymans, 10. Thomas Castaignède, 9. Pierre Mignoni, 8. Julien Bonnaire, 7. Rémy Martin, 6. Thierry Dusautoir, 5. Fabien Pelous (c), 4. Lionel Nallet, 3. David Attoub, 2. Raphaël Ibañez, 1. Sylvain Marconnet – Replacements: 16. Dimitri Szarzewski, 17. Vincent Debaty, 18. Jérôme Thion, 19. Imanol Harinordoquy, 21. David Marty, 22. Julien Laharrague – Unused: 20. Dimitri Yachvili

24 June 2006

South Africa	26–36	France
Try: Russell; Pen: Montgomery 7		Try: Clerc 2, Heymans, Traill; Con: Yachvili 2 Pen: Yachvili 2 Drop: Fritz, Traille

Newlands Stadium, Cape Town
Attendance: 46,000
Referee: Stuart Dickinson (Australia)

South Africa: 15. Percy Montgomery, 14. Brent Russell, 13. Wynand Olivier, 12. De Wet Barry, 11. Bryan Habana, 10. Jaco van der Westhuyzen, 9. Fourie du Preez, 8. Pedrie Wannenburg, 7. Juan Smith, 6. Joe van Niekerk, 5. Victor Matfield, 4. Danie Rossouw, 3. Eddie Andrews, 2. John Smit (c), 1. Os du Randt – Replacements: 17. CJ van der Linde, 19. Jacques Cronjé, 20. Ricky Januarie, 21. Wayne Julies, 22. Gaffie du Toit – Unused: 16. Gary Botha, 18. Albert van den Berg
France: 15. Julien Laharrague, 14. Vincent Clerc, 13. Florian Fritz, 12. Yannick Jauzion, 11. Cédric Heymans, 10. Damien Traille, 9. Dimitri Yachvili, 8. Imanol Harinordoquy, 7. Thierry Dusautoir, 6. Serge Betsen, 5. Jérôme Thion, 4. Fabien Pelous (c), 3. Pieter de Villiers, 2. Dimitri Szarzewski, 1. Sylvain Marconnet – Replacements: 16. Raphaël Ibañez, 18. Lionel Nallet, 19. Julien Bonnaire, 20. Rémy Martin, 22. Thomas Castaignède – Unused: 17. Vincent Debaty, 21. Pierre Mignoni
