= Senekal (surname) =

Senekal is a surname. Notable people with the surname include:

- Dewald Senekal (born 1981), South African rugby union player and coach
- Heino Senekal (born 1975), Namibian rugby union player
- Ischke Senekal (born 1993), South African discus thrower

== See also ==
- Senekal
