= Johan Diergaardt =

Namibian rugby union coach

Johan Diergaardt is a Namibian rugby union coach.

He was coach of Western Suburbs Premier League Namibian team and chairman of the national selectors committee. He was nominated head coach of Namibia, in February 2008.

Diergaardt achieved the third qualification in a row of Namibia for the 2011 Rugby World Cup. He also won for the first time the IRB Nations Cup of 2010, in Romania. Namibia disappointed at the 2011 Rugby World Cup finals, losing once again all the four matches.

Sporting positions
Preceded by (Namibia) Hakkies Husselman	Namibia National Rugby Union Coach; 2008–2011	Succeeded by (Namibia) Danie Vermeulen
Preceded by (Wales) Phil Davies	Namibia National Rugby Union Coach; 2020–2021	Succeeded by (South Africa) Allister Coetzee
