= Nicolae Dragoș Dima =

Romanian retired rugby union player

Dragoș Dima
- Born: Dragoș Nicolae Dima; 30 July 1979 (age 47) Focșani, Romania
- Height: 1.85 m (6 ft 1 in)

Rugby union career
- Position: Prop
Youth career
- 1993–1996: LPS Focșani
- 1996–1998: Farul Constanța
- 1998–1999: Castres Olympique
Senior career
Years	Team	Apps	(Points)
1999–2002	Castres Olympique		
2002–2005	Stade Toulousain		
2005–2006	Villefranche		
2006–2008	Section Paloise		
2008–2009	US Orthez		
2009–2010	Oloron		
2010–2011	Blagnac		
International career
Years	Team	Apps	(Points)
1999–2011	Romania	39	(10)

Dragoș Nicolae Dima (born 30 July 1979 in Focșani) is a Romanian former rugby union prop and current coach.

Dima spent his entire club career in France, playing for Castres Olympique (1999/02), Stade Toulousain (2002/05), Villefranchois (2005/06), Section Paloise (2006/08), US Orthez (2008/09), Oloron (2009/10) and Blagnac (2010/11). He was the assistant coach of Angers in the 2013/14 season

He has 39 caps for Romania, from 1999 to 2011, scoring 2 tries, 10 points on aggregate. He had his debut for the "Oaks" at the 1999 Rugby World Cup, playing in three games as a substitute but without scoring. He would be called again for the 2011 Rugby World Cup, but this time he didn't play.

Dima comes from a sporting family. His mother Constanța was a volleyball player and his father Costică a former Greco-Roman wrestler.

== Honours ==
=== Club ===
Toulouse

- Heineken Cup: 2004–05

Castres

- European Challenge Cup runner-up: 1999–00

=== International ===
Romania

- European Nations Cup: 2000
