= Bogdan Tudor (rugby union) =

- Born: Bogdan Tudor; 29 November 1976 (age 49) Romania
- Height: 6 ft 2 in (188 cm)
- Weight: 238 lb (108 kg)

Rugby union career
- Position: Lock
Senior career
Years	Team	Apps	(Points)
2006–07	Valence	17	(0)
International career
Years	Team	Apps	(Points)
2003	Romania	2	(0)

Bogdan Tudor (born 29 November 1976) is a former Romanian rugby union player. He played as a lock.

== Club career ==
During his career, Tudor played for Valence in France.

== International career ==
Tudor gathered 2 caps for Romania, both of them in 2003. He was a member of his national side for the 6th Rugby World Cup in 2003, where he played one match and his final one for the Oaks in Pool A against the host country, the Wallabies.
