= Andries Blaauw =

Namibia international rugby union player

- Born: March 25, 1970 (age 56) Keetmanshoop, South-West Africa

Rugby union career
- Position: Prop
International career
Years	Team	Apps	(Points)
1996–2004	Namibia	24	(5)

Andries J.K. Blaauw (born 25 March 1970) is a Namibian rugby union player. He made his international debut in 1996.

== Career ==
He made his international debut for Namibia against Zimbabwe on 1 March 1996 at Windhoek. He was named in Namibian squads for 1999 Rugby World Cup and 2003 Rugby World Cup. His last competitive international match came against Morocco at Casablanca on 29 February 2004.
