= Iulian Andrei =

Romanian rugby union player

- Born: Iulian Andrei; 28 July 1974 (age 52) Bucharest, Romania
- Height: 5 ft 7 in (170 cm)
- Weight: 165 lb (75 kg)

Rugby union career
- Position: Scrum-half
Senior career
Years	Team	Apps	(Points)
1993–1999	CSM Sibiu		
1999–2009	Steaua București		
Provincial / State sides
Years	Team	Apps	(Points)
2004–2009	București Wolves	8	(28)
International career
Years	Team	Apps	(Points)
2003–2008	Romania	22	(2)

Iulian Andrei (born 28 July 1974 in Bucharest) is a former Romanian rugby union player. He played as a scrum-half.

== Club career ==
During his career, Andrei played mostly for Steaua București in Romania and for București Wolves, a Romanian professional rugby union team based in Bucharest that competed in the European Rugby Challenge Cup competition.

== International career ==
Andrei gathered 22 caps for Romania, from his debut in 2003 against Czech Republic to his last game in 2008 against Russia. He was a member of his national side for the 6th Rugby World Cup in 2003, where he played three matches in Pool A against Ireland, Argentina and Namibia.

== Honours ==
CSM Sibiu

- Romanian Cup: 1994, 1995

Steaua București

- SuperLiga: 2002–03, 2004–05, 2005–06
- Romanian Cup: 2006, 2007
