= Vincent Dreyer =

Namibian rugby union fullback

- Born: 8 October 1978 (age 48)
- Height: 5 ft 10 in (1.78 m)
- Weight: 173 lb (78 kg; 12.4 st)

Rugby union career
- Position: Fullback
International career
Years	Team	Apps	(Points)
2002-2003	Namibia	4	(0)

Vincent Dreyer (born 8 October 1978) was a Namibian rugby union fullback. He played with the Namibia national rugby union team at the 2003 Rugby World Cup.
