= Ovidiu Tonița =

Romania international rugby union player

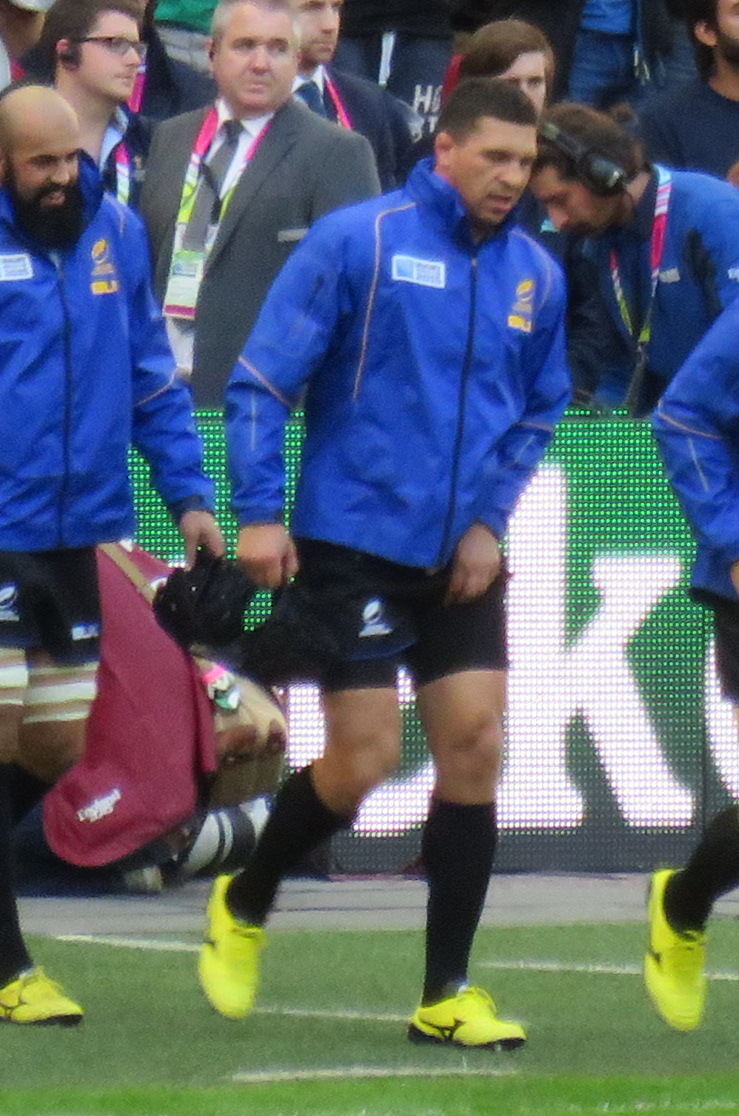
- Tonița at the 2015 Rugby World Cup
- Born: 6 August 1980 (age 46) Bârlad, Romania
- Height: 1.95 m (6 ft 5 in)
- Weight: 109 kg (17 st 2 lb)

Rugby union career
- Position: Flanker
Senior career
Years	Team	Apps	(Points)
1999–2002	Grenoble		
2002–2004	Biarritz	36	(35)
2004–2012	Perpignan	160	(75)
2012–2014	Carcassonne	22	(5)
2014–2015	Provence	10	(0)
2015–2016	Carcassonne	9	(0)
2016–2018	Salanque CR		
2019	CSM București	3	(5)
International career
Years	Team	Apps	(Points)
2000–2016	Romania	73	(75)

Ovidiu Tonița (born 6 August 1980) is a Romanian former rugby union player who played 73 times for the Romania national team between 2000 and 2016. A former lock and presently a flanker and number 8. He played the majority of his career for USA Perpignan. He is noted for his size, which is considered unusual for his position on the field. His supporters are known to have compared him to the Australian footballer John Eales, and he is often seen as Romania's key player.

== Career ==
Born in Bârlad, Tonița worked as a soft drinks distributor for The Coca-Cola Company from age 15, and played rugby for local club Rulmentul Bârlad. He moved to France, where he played in the Top 14, originally for FC Grenoble (1999–2002), and later for Biarritz Olympique (2002–2004).

In 1999, at the age of 19, he made his international debut as a reserve for the Romania national team, being one of the youngest players at the 1999 Rugby World Cup. His test debut was against Morocco national team in 2000. He won his first 14 caps as a lock, and established himself as a flanker after moving to Perpignan.

He was included in Romania's squad at the 2003 Rugby World Cup. He was injured for three months in early 2005 and took part in the 2007 Rugby World Cup, where he was Romania's vice-captain. During the latter event, as Romania prepared to face the Scotland, Tonița was deemed "perhaps (Romania's) one world-class player" in a Scotsman article. An analysis of the Romanian squad, published by The West Australian, noted that Tonița "is a class act in the scrum", while arguing that, given Romania's poor results: "The sad thing for him is that he is playing with the wrong generation of players." He also competed at the 2011 and 2015 Rugby World Cups. In a testimony to both the length of his top-level career and his country's lack of World Cup success, Tonița set a new record at the 2015 World Cup by participating in his 12th losing World Cup match, surpassing the previous record of 11 held by his countryman Romeo Gontineac and Namibian Hugo Horn.

== Honours ==
Club
Grenoble

- Pro D2
  - Runner-up: 2001–02

Perpignan

- Top 14
  - Champion: 2009
  - Runner-up: 2010

International
Romania

- European Nations Cup: 2004–06
