= Vasile Ghioc =

Romanian rugby union player

- Born: Vasile Ghioc; 28 February 1978 (age 48) Bucharest, Romania
- Height: 5 ft 11 in (180 cm)
- Weight: 176 lb (80 kg)

Rugby union career
- Position: Wing
Senior career
Years	Team	Apps	(Points)
?–2003	Dinamo București		
2003–?	Launceston		
- Dinamo București
Provincial / State sides
Years	Team	Apps	(Points)
1998–2003	Dinamo București	15	(10)
2004–05	București Wolves	2	(0)
International career
Years	Team	Apps	(Points)
2000–2008	Romania	22	(30)

Vasile Ghioc (born 28 February 1978 in Bucharest) is a former Romanian rugby union player. He played as a wing.

== Club career ==
During his career, Ghioc played mostly for Dinamo București in Romania and for București Wolves a Romanian professional rugby union team based in Bucharest and competed with both teams in the European Rugby Challenge Cup competition. In 2003 he moved to English-based club Launceston only to return to Dinamo a short period of time after his stint in English rugby.

== International career ==
Ghioc gathered 22 caps for Romania, from his debut in 2000 against Italy to his last game in 2008 against Portugal. He was a member of his national side for the 6th Rugby World Cup in 2003, where he played a single match in Pool A against Argentina.
