= Deon Mouton =

Namibia international rugby union player

- Born: 20 November 1974 (age 51) Rehoboth, South West Africa
- Height: 1.84 m (6 ft 1/2 in)
- Weight: 96 kg (212 lb; 15.1 st)

Rugby union career
- Position: Wing
International career
Years	Team	Apps	(Points)
1999–2008	Namibia	24	(30)

Deon Mouton (born 20 November 1974 in Rehoboth) is a Namibian rugby union wing. He is a member of the Namibia national rugby union team and participated with the squad at the 2007 Rugby World Cup.
