= Herman Lintvelt =

Namibia international rugby union player

- Born: September 6, 1976 (age 50) Windhoek, Namibia
- Height: 1.93 m (6 ft 4 in)
- Weight: 104 kg (229 lb; 16.4 st)

Rugby union career
- Position: Flanker
International career
Years	Team	Apps	(Points)
1998–2007	Namibia	33	(40)

Herman Lintvelt (born 6 September 1976 in Windhoek) is a Namibian rugby union player. He is a member of the Namibia national rugby union team and participated with the squad at the 2007 Rugby World Cup. He made his test debut against Ivory Coast in Casablanca on 12 September 1998. His last test was against Argentina in Marseille on 22 Sept 2007.
