= Federico Méndez =

Argentine rugby union player (born 1972)

- Born: Federico Eduardo Méndez Azpillaga; 2 August 1972 (age 54) Mendoza, Argentina
- Height: 1.83 m (6 ft 0 in)
- Weight: 108 kg (17 st 0 lb)

Rugby union career
- Position: Hooker
- Current team: Mendoza RC (coach)
Senior career
| Years | Team | Apps | (Points) |
| ????-1996 | Mendoza RC | | |
| 1996 | Sharks (Currie Cup) | | |
| 1997–98 | Bath | | |
| 1998–2000 | Northampton | | |
| 2000–01 | Bordeaux-Bègles | | |
| 2002 | Sharks (Currie Cup) | | |
| 2002–05 | Mendoza RC | | |
| 2005 | Western Province | | |
International career
| Years | Team | Apps | (Points) |
| 1990–2004 | Argentina | 74 | (70) |
Coaching career
- Years: Team
- 2005–present: Mendoza RC

Federico Eduardo Méndez Azpillaga (born 2 August 1972) is an Argentine rugby union footballer. Méndez played professional rugby in South Africa, England and France. He also played for Mendoza Rugby Club in Argentina and won 74 caps for the Argentina national rugby union team, including appearances at four Rugby World Cups, in 1991, 1995 and 2003. Mendez was considered the best hooker at the 1995 World Cup and had the unique ability to play hooker, loosehead or tighthead.

== Biography ==
=== Playing career ===
Méndez started his career with Mendoza RC in his hometown; he made his Argentina debut as a teenager, and was sent off in a match against England for a punch on English lock Paul Ackford in 1990.

Méndez played in the 1995 Rugby World Cup and later played for Sharks in South Africa winning the Currie Cup in 1996.

He played for Bath Rugby and Northampton Saints in England. He won the Heineken Cup in 1998 with Bath (as a replacement) and then in 2000 with Northampton, thus becoming the first player to win the trophy twice. Mendez also won the player of the season award for Northampton Saints in the 1998–99 season.

Méndez then had a spell in France with Bordeaux-Bègles and a second spell with Sharks before returning to Argentina to play for Mendoza RC.

=== Coaching career ===
Méndez announced his retirement from rugby in 2005, but returned to the game later that year for a brief spell as player-coach at Western Province in South Africa. He then went on to coach at his beloved Mendoza RC.

He recently turned down the position of scrum coach for the South African Springboks. He said he could not live with himself if he helped the Boks beat the Argentinian Pumas.

Méndez is currently on the panel of judges for the annual IRB Awards.
