= Kees Lensing =

Namibian rugby union player and coach (born 1978)

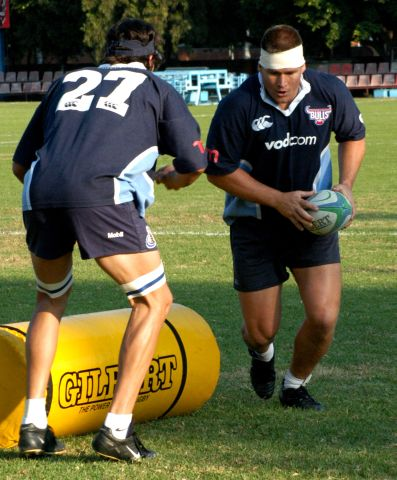
- Born: Gideon "Kees" Lensing; 1 June 1978 (age 48) Keetmanshoop, Namibia
- Height: 1.9 m (6 ft 3 in)
- Weight: 125 kg (276 lb; 19.7 st)

Rugby union career
- Position: Prop
Senior career
Years	Team	Apps	(Points)
- Castres
2001–10	Leeds Carnegie		
–	Sharks		
–	Bulls		
–	Mighty Elephants		
–	Griffons		
International career
Years	Team	Apps	(Points)
2002–09	Namibia	24	(5)
Coaching career
- Years: Team
- 2018–19: Rugby United New York (Forwards)
- 2020–2021: Seattle Seawolves (head)
- Correct as of January 18, 2022

Gideon "Kees" Lensing (born 1 June 1978 in Keetmanshoop, Namibia) is a former Namibian rugby union player and former head coach of the Seattle Seawolves of Major League Rugby (MLR). He played as a prop for six different teams over more than 11 years.

== Professional rugby career ==
Lensing played for the Namibia national rugby union team in the 2003 Rugby World Cup and the 2007 Rugby World Cup. He was Captain of the Namibia National Team from 2006 to 2009, and ultimately played 24 matches for Namibia (including leading the team at the 2007 World Cup).

== Coaching career ==
Following a back injury, Lensing retired from his career as a player and transitioned into coaching in 2011. After three years as the specialist scrum/forwards and defense coach of the Canon Eagles in Japan's Top League,

Lensing relocated to New York City and signed as forwards coach of Rugby United New York for the Major League Rugby 2019 season. He stayed in the MLR and served as the head coach of the Seattle Seawolves in the 2020 and 2021 seasons.

== Professional rugby career ==
=== South Africa ===
Lensing played for six teams during his professional rugby career. He made his professional debut at age 21 with South Africa's Northern Free State Griffons, playing 49 matches from 1999 to 2001.

In 2001, Lensing was selected for the South African National Rugby Union Team, the Springboks, U/23 Group, but had to withdraw due to a knee injury.

From 2002 to 2003, Lensing played with the Mighty Elephants (South Africa). He also made his debut for the Namibian National Side during this time (2002), and at age 25 he represented Namibia at the 2003 Rugby World Cup as first choice loose head prop.

From 2004 to 2005, he signed with the Blue Bulls Rugby Union Team (South Africa). Lensing played 47 matches in two seasons with the Bulls and in 2004 helped bring the team to a first place win at the Currie Cup and second place at the Vodacom Cup. He played for the Blue Bulls in the 2005 Super 12 international rugby competition, and was selected as Man of the match (MVP) in the game against the Australian Queensland Rugby Union (the Reds) at Loftus Versfeld Stadium in Pretoria, South Africa. During this time, he was named in the Super Rugby "Super XV" two weeks in a row. In total, Lensing had 10 Test match appearances for the Bulls. While playing for the Bulls, he also gained experience conducting numerous training sessions and clinics at schools.

=== Europe ===
In 2006, Lensing signed a three-year contract to play for Yorkshire Carnegie in Leeds, England (formerly Leeds Carnegie/LeedsTykes). The move was seen as a loss to the Bulls. However, at the end of his first season with Leeds, Lensing exercised the opt-out release clause in his contract and was aggressively recruited by the Sharks. He returned to South Africa to play for the Sharks in the Super 14 in 2006, generating controversy surrounding a reportedly high salary that was allegedly leaked to the media by a competing agent. Brian Smith, then-director of the London Irish, publicly criticized Lensing for the move, claiming that he had agreed to play for the Exiles. Lensing played for the Sharks from 2006 to 2008.

In 2007, at age 29, Lensing represented Namibia for the second time at the Rugby World Cup, this time as Team Captain. Although he was living in South Africa at the time, Lensing was barred from playing for South Africa under World Rugby Regulations because he had already represented Namibia in the 2003 World Cup.

In 2008, Lensing signed with Castres Olympique (France) in the Top 14 French rugby union league. He continued to play for the Namibian national team until 2009. In 2010, after helping Namibia qualify for the 2011 Rugby World Cup, Lensing announced his retirement at the age of 32.

In 2014, Lensing played for the Classic Springboks (South Africa), at the World Rugby Classic in Bermuda.

== Coaching career ==
=== South Africa ===
In 2011, Lensing completed his Level 1 and Level 2 World Rugby (International Rugby Board) coaching certification and began coaching both players and other coaches. He first worked as a Forward Coach with the South African Correctional Services team in 2011.

In 2012, Lensing became a forwards coach with the Blue Bulls Tuks Rugby Academy at the University of Pretoria. Within the year he transitioned to head coach, and in November 2012 he became a scrum and forwards coach of the Tuks team.

In 2013, Lensing was named Forward Coach of the Limpopo Blue Bulls, U/21.

In 2014, he was selected as Forward Coach at the Investec International Rugby Academy in South Africa.

=== Overseas ===
In 2015, Lensing was recruited as Specialist Scrum/Forward and Defense Coach of the Canon Eagles in Japan's Top League in Tokyo, Japan. In 2015, the Eagles placed 6th out of 16 teams in the Top League.

In 2018, Rugby United New York announced via its website and social media accounts that it had signed Lensing as the forwards coach for the New York City side's first season in Major League Rugby. Additionally, Lensing continues to do education and training seminars for World Rugby, USA Rugby, the Blue Bulls Tuks Rugby Academy, and the Kees Lensing Front Row Academy at the International Rugby Institute in Pretoria, South Africa.

== Successive clubs ==
- Northern Free State Griffons (South Africa) 1999–2001
- Eastern Province Elephants (South Africa) 2002–2003
- Blue Bulls (South Africa) 2004–2005
- Leeds Tykes (England) 2005–2006
- Sharks (South Africa) 2006–2007
- Castres Olympique (France) 2008
