= Alexandru Tudori =

Romanian rugby union player

Alex Tudori
- Full name: Marian Alexandru Tudori
- Born: 11 October 1978 (age 48) Bucharest, Romania
- Height: 1.94 m (6 ft 4 in)
- Weight: 105 kg (231 lb)

Rugby union career
- Position: Flanker
Youth career
- 1988–1997: Steaua București
Senior career
Years	Team	Apps	(Points)
1997–1998	Steaua București		
1998–2000	Universitatea Cluj		
2000–2002	RC Rouen		
2002	CA Pontarlier		
2002–2003	Universitatea Cluj		
2003–2004	Peyrehorade SR		
2004–2005	CA Périgueux		
2005–2006	Venezia Mestre		
2006–2010	Dinamo București		
2010–2012	ROC La Voulte-Valence		
2012–2015	Rouen Normandie; Stade Poitevin		
International career
Years	Team	Apps	(Points)
2003–2009	Romania	35	(20)
Coaching career
- Years: Team
- 2018–2019: Stade Poitevin
- 2019–: RC Toulon U-15
- 2020–: Romania U-20 (forwards)

Marian Alexandru "Alex" Tudori (born 11 October 1978 in Bucharest) is a Romanian former rugby union flanker and current coach.

Tudori had 35 caps for Romania, with 4 tries scored, 20 points in aggregate. He was called for the 2003 Rugby World Cup, playing four games, and for the 2007 Rugby World Cup, playing three games.

== Honours ==
=== Club ===
Dinamo București

- SuperLiga champion: 2006/07, 2007/08
- Romanian Cup: 2007/08
