= Bernard Charreyre =

French rugby union player & coach

Bernard Charreyre (born Perpignan, 27 January 1950) is a French rugby union coach and a former footballer.

He won the title of French Junior Championship at USA Perpignan, in 1969. He would play most of his career at Asptt Paris, where he stayed 14 years.

He coached French Students (1996) and won the Students World Cup in South Africa. He also was the coach of France U-19 (from 1999 until 2001) and won the U-19 World Cup in 2000 in France. He was later assigned as head coach of Romania after they had been smashed 134–0 by England at Twickenham in November 2001.

In January 2002 Charreyre took over. He was nicknamed the Little Napoleon. That year they won the European Nations Cup and qualified for the 2003 Rugby World Cup finals, where they suffered in their tough pool with defeats at the hands of Australia (90–8), Argentina (50–3) and Ireland (45–17). Romania won the last game against Namibia (37–7) but Bernard Charreyre decided to leave the Romanian team at the end of the competition.
