= Corne Powell =

Namibia international rugby union player

- Born: 27 May 1974 (age 52) Windhoek, Namibia
- Height: 194 cm (6 ft 4 in)
- Weight: 95 kg (209 lb; 14 st 13 lb)

Rugby union career
- Position: Centre
International career
Years	Team	Apps	(Points)
2001–2007	Namibia	26	(50)
- Correct as of 5 May 2021

Corne Powell (born 27 May 1974 in Namibia) was a Namibian rugby union player. His playing position was centre. He was named in the Namibia squad for both the 2003 Rugby World Cup and the 2007 Rugby World Cup's, making 5 total appearances in the tournaments, scoring one try. He was the Namibian captain heading into the 2003 World Cup, before coach David Waterston announced Sean Furter as captain for the tournament.
