= Marcel Socaciu =

- Born: Sorin Marcel Socaciu; 23 April 1972 (age 54) Mociu, Romania
- Height: 5 ft 11 in (180 cm)
- Weight: 243 lb (110 kg)

Rugby union career
- Position: Prop
Senior career
Years	Team	Apps	(Points)
2001–05	Rovigo Delta		
2005–06	Tarbes		
2006–10	Périgueux		
2010–	Belvès		
International career
Years	Team	Apps	(Points)
2000–06	Romania	34	(0)

Sorin Marcel Socaciu (born 23 April 1972 in Mociu) is a former Romanian rugby union player. He played as a prop.

== Club career ==
During his career, Socaciu played for Rovigo Delta in Italy, Tarbes, Périgueux and Belvès, all in France.

== International career ==
Socaciu gathered 34 caps for Romania, from his debut in 2000 to his last game in 2006. He was a member of his national side for the 5th and 6th Rugby World Cups in 1999 and 2003. At the 2003 World Cup he played three matches against Ireland, Wallabies and Namibia.
