= Silviu Florea =

Romanian rugby union player

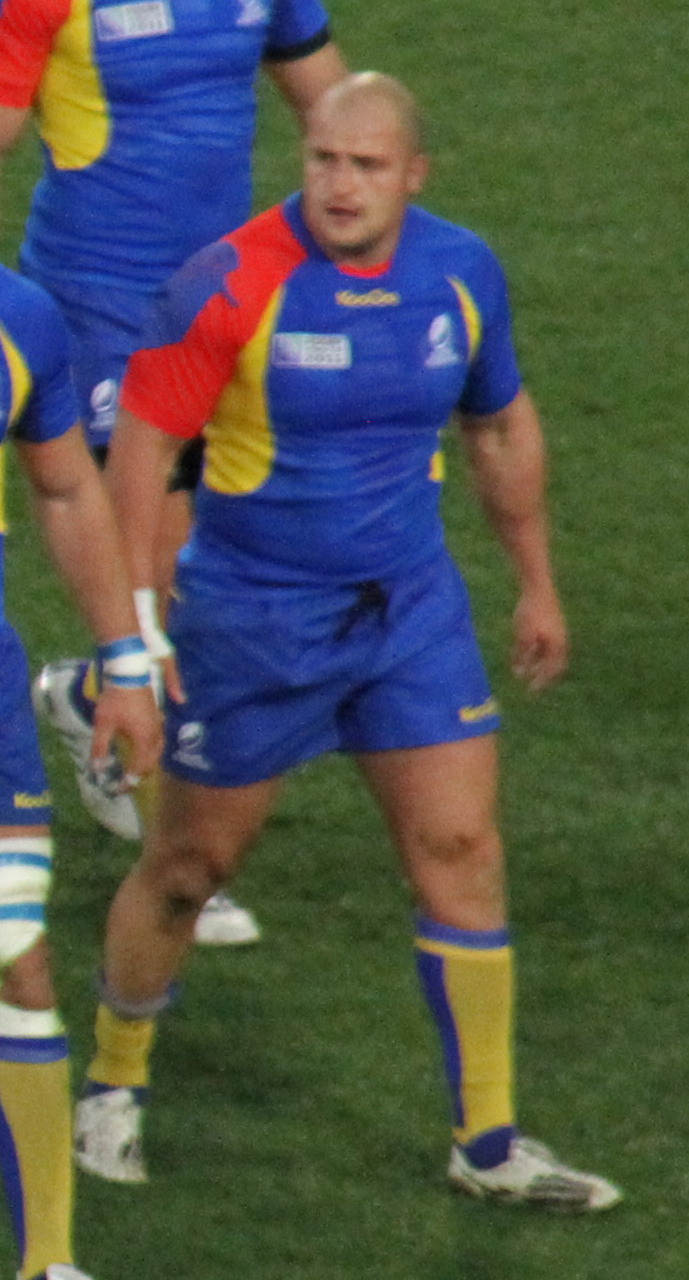
- Silviu Florea at 2011 Rugby World Cup during the match vs England
- Born: Silviu Florea; 19 April 1977 (age 49) Bucharest, Romania
- Height: 1.82 m (6 ft 0 in)
- Weight: 105 kg (16.5 st)

Rugby union career
- Position: Prop
Senior career
Years	Team	Apps	(Points)
2000–2003	RC Cannes		
2003–2005	Steaua Bucharest		
2005–2006	Racing Métro 92		
2006–2008	AS Béziers		
2008–2010	US Montauban		
2011–	Bordeaux		
International career
Years	Team	Apps	(Points)
2000–2010	Romania	29	(0)
- Correct as of 19 December 2011

Silviu Florea (born 19 April 1977, in Bucharest) is a Romanian rugby union player. He plays as a prop.

He played for RC Cannes-Mandelieu before returning to Romania, where he played for Steaua Bucharest, from 2003 to 2006, winning the Divizia Naţională. He then moved back to France, to play for Racing Métro 92, until 2006, when he joined AS Béziers.

He made his debut for Romania on 18 November 2000 against Italy. He went to play at the 2003 Rugby World Cup, the 2007 Rugby World Cup and the 2011 Rugby World Cup.
