= Alin Petrache =

Romanian rugby union player

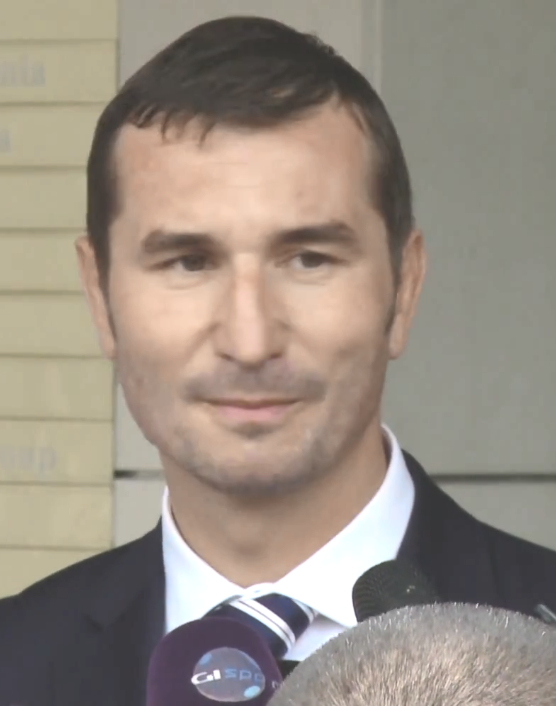
- Petrache in 2014 during a press conference
- Born: Adrian Alin Petrache; 29 October 1976 (age 50) Bucharest, Romania
- Height: 6 ft 4 in (1.93 m)
- Weight: 236 lb (107 kg; 16 st 12 lb)

Rugby union career
- Position: Number Eight
Youth career
- Locomotiva București
Senior career
Years	Team	Apps	(Points)
1995–1996	Universitatea Timișoara		
1996–1999	Dinamo Bucharest		
1999–2000	RC Paris		
2000–2001	Bordeaux Bègles		
2001–2002	Dinamo Bucharest		
2002–2003	Toulon		
2003–2005	AS Béziers		
International career
Years	Team	Apps	(Points)
1998–2004	Romania	31	(30)

Adrian Alin Petrache (born 29 October 1976 in Bucharest) is a Romanian rugby union administrator and former player. He is currently the president of CSM București sports club and also president of the Romanian Rugby Federation. He was also the president of the Romanian Olympic and Sports Committee between 2014 and 2016.

Petrache was a member of the Romania national team. He played three matches at the 1999 Rugby World Cup and scored a try against the United States. He played as a Number Eight.
