= Cezar Popescu =

Romania international rugby union player

- Born: 29 December 1976 (age 49)
- Height: 1.88 m (6 ft 2 in)
- Weight: 120 kg (265 lb; 18 st 13 lb)

Rugby union career
- Position: Prop
International career
Years	Team	Apps	(Points)
1997–2011	Romania	49	(30)

Cezar Popescu (born 29 December 1976 in Bucharest) is a Romanian rugby union player. He plays as a prop.

He first played at CSA Steaua București (Rugby), moving to Tarbes Pyrénées Rugby in 2003. He moved in 2005 to SU Agen, where he would play two seasons. He played for RC Chalon for the season of 2008/09.

Popescu has currently 41 caps for Romania, with 5 tries scored, 25 points in aggregate. His first cap was at a 4 October 1997, in an 83–18 win over Belgium, in Brussels, in a 1999 Rugby World Cup qualifier, aged only 20 years old. He was a member of Romania squad at the 2003 Rugby World Cup, playing in four games, and at the 2007 Rugby World Cup, playing in two matches.
