= Cristian Podea =

Romanian rugby union player and coach

- Born: Ionel Cristian Podea; 22 February 1979 (age 47) Bucharest, Romania
- Height: 5 ft 8 in (173 cm)
- Weight: 182 lb (83 kg)

Rugby union career
- Position: Scrum-half
Senior career
Years	Team	Apps	(Points)
–2003	Universitatea Cluj		
2003	Dinamo București		
- CSU Arad
- Timișoara
2009–13	Baia Mare		
2013–15	Universitatea Cluj		
International career
Years	Team	Apps	(Points)
2001–03	Romania	9	(0)

Cristian Podea (born 22 February 1979 in Bucharest) is a former Romanian rugby union player and coach. He played as a scrum-half.

== Club career ==
During his career, Podea played for Universitatea Cluj, Dinamo București, CSU Arad, Timișoara, Baia Mare and again for Universitatea Cluj.

== International career ==
Podea gathered 9 caps for Romania, from his debut in 2001 to his last game in 2003. He was a member of his national side for the 6th Rugby World Cup in 2003 playing one match against host country, the Wallabies.

Since 2019, Podea is the current team manager of U Cluj Rugby, which plays in the Romanian SuperLiga.
