= Răzvan Mavrodin =

Romanian rugby union footballer and coach

- Born: 29 September 1973 (age 53) Bucharest, Romania
- Height: 1.78 m (5 ft 10 in)
- Weight: 100 kg (220 lb; 16 st)

Rugby union career
- Position: Hooker
Senior career
Years	Team	Apps	(Points)
1993–1999	Steaua Bucharest		
1999–2000	RC France		
2000–2001	Perpignan		
2001–2006	Tarbes		
2006–2008	Section Paloise		
2008–2008	Tarbes		
International career
Years	Team	Apps	(Points)
1998–2009	Romania	50	(10)
Coaching career
- Years: Team
- 2009–2012: Tarbes
- 2012–2013: Stade Nantais

Răzvan Mavrodin (born 29 September 1973 in Bucharest) is a Romanian former rugby union player and a current coach. He played as a hooker.

== Career ==
Mavrodin played in France for Racing Club (1999/00), USA Perpignan (2000/01), Tarbes Pyrénées Rugby (2001/06), Section Paloise (2006/08), returning to Tarbes Pyrénées Rugby for the final season of his career, in 2008/09. He became the teams forwards coach for the season of 2009/10.

Mavrodin had 50 caps for Romania, from 1998 to 2007, scoring 2 tries, 10 points in aggregate. He played at three Rugby World Cup finals. At the 1999 Rugby World Cup, he played in three games, at the 2003 Rugby World Cup, in four games, and at the 2007 Rugby World Cup, in four games once more. He never score in any of his presences at the Rugby World Cup finals.

== Honours ==
=== Club ===
Steaua Bucharest

- SuperLiga : 1998/99

=== International ===
Romania

- European Nations Cup: 2000
