= Du Preez Grobler =

Namibia international rugby union player

- Born: June 8, 1977 (age 49) Keetmanshoop, ǁKaras Region
- Height: 1.83 m (6 ft 0 in)
- Weight: 93 kg (205 lb; 14.6 st)

Rugby union career
- Position: Centre
International career
Years	Team	Apps	(Points)
2001–2008	Namibia	25	(50)

Du Preez Grobler (born 8 June 1977 in Keetmanshoop, ǁKaras Region) is a Namibian rugby union centre. He played with the Namibia national rugby union team at the 2003 Rugby World Cup and 2007 Rugby World Cup.
