= Martín Gaitán =

Argentine rugby union player and coach

- Born: June 15, 1978 (age 48) Paraná, Entre Ríos, Argentina
- Height: 1.77 m (5 ft 10 in)
- Weight: 85 kg (13 st 5 lb)

Rugby union career
- Position: Centre
Senior career
Years	Team	Apps	(Points)
2002-2007	Biarritz		
1997-2002	CASI		
International career
Years	Team	Apps	(Points)
1998-2007	Argentina	10	(40)
- Correct as of 30 September 2007
National sevens team
Years	Team		Comps
1998-2002	Argentina		22

Martín Gaitán (born June 15, 1978, in Paraná) is a former rugby union football player and current coach from Argentina.

Gaitán started his career with Club Atlético San Isidro in 1997. He soon earned his debut for the national team, playing against the United States team in 1998. He then spent most of the next four years playing sevens. He played as a centre.

In 2002, Gaitán moved to France to play for Biarritz, but only played two Heineken Cup seasons due to having a European passport and in 2003 he was selected to be part of the Argentina Rugby World Cup squad. In 2005, he eventually played in the French Championship from the 2004–05 season, taking part in the victory of the Bouclier de Brennus. He did not take part in the 2005 and 2006 finals due to a knee injury.

He was selected to play for Argentina at the 2007 tournament, but a scan revealed that he had a blocked artery in his heart, this meant that he missed the tournament in order to have surgery. He eventually had to retire from rugby because of this.

In 2009, he became coach of the Biarritz Olympique youth team and video analyst for the first-grade team.

In 2012 and 2013, he was named assistant coach for Argentina under head coaches Santiago Phelan and Daniel Hourcade. Between 2013 and 2015, he was in charge of formating young coaches for Union Argentina de Rugby.
