= Cristian Petre =

Romania international rugby union player

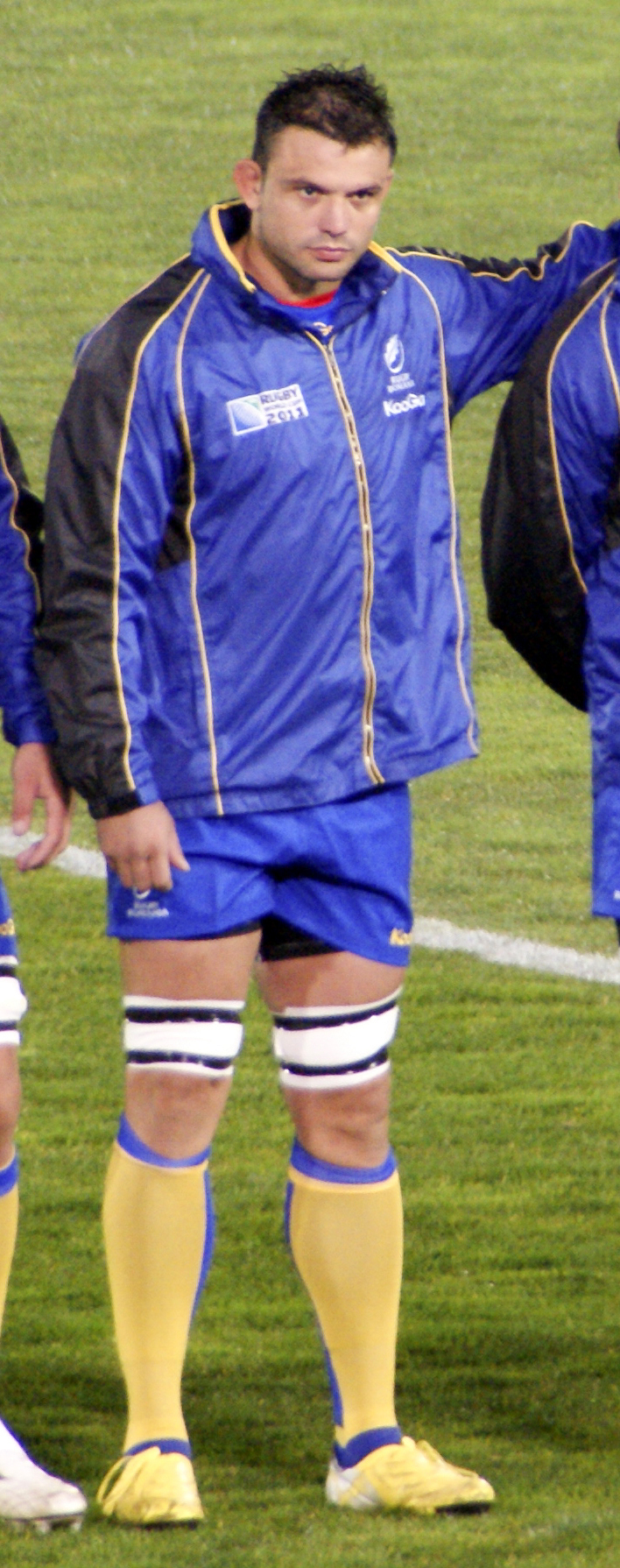
- Petre with Romania in 2011.
- Born: 22 March 1979 (age 47) Oradea, Romania
- Height: 1.95 m (6 ft 5 in)
- Weight: 115 kg (18 st 2 lb; 254 lb)

Rugby union career
- Position: Lock
Senior career
Years	Team	Apps	(Points)
1997–2002	Universitatea Cluj		
2002–2004	Racing-Métro		
2004–2006	Tarbes	43	(5)
2006–2007	Brive	13	(0)
2007–2010	Béziers	66	(5)
2010–2012	Saint-Étienne	33	(0)
2012–2013	Stade nantais		
2013–2014	RCJ Farul Constanța	10	(0)
International career
Years	Team	Apps	(Points)
2001–2012	Romania	92	(30)

Cristian Constantin Petre (born 22 March 1979 in Oradea) is a Romanian former rugby union player and current coach.

He won 92 caps for the Romania national rugby union team, with 6 tries scored, 30 points in aggregate. Petre played in all the four games for his country at the 2007 Rugby World Cup.

== Honours ==
Romania

- European Nations Cup (2): 2002, 2006
