= Mihai Vioreanu =

Romanian rugby union player

- Born: Mihai Horia Vioreanu; 3 October 1974 (age 52) Făgăraș, Romania
- Height: 6 ft 0 in (183 cm)
- Weight: 180 lb (82 kg)
- School: Victor Babeș University of Medicine and Pharmacy
- Occupation: Orthopedic surgeon

Rugby union career
- Position(s): Fullback, Centre
Senior career
Years	Team	Apps	(Points)
- Universitatea Timișoara
1999–2000	RC Strasbourg		
2000–05	De La Salle Palmerston		
Provincial / State sides
Years	Team	Apps	(Points)
1998–1999	Dinamo București	2	(0)
International career
Years	Team	Apps	(Points)
1994–2003	Romania	30	(45)

Mihai Vioreanu (born 3 October 1974 in Făgăraș) is a former Romanian rugby union football player and currently a surgeon specialized in orthopedic surgery. He played as a fullback or as centre.

Vioreanu is an experienced, Irish-trained consultant orthopedic surgeon with expertise in knee and hip surgery obtained in Canada and Australia and performing over 500 surgeries yearly.

== Club career ==
During his career in Romania, Vioreanu mostly played for Universitatea Timișoara and was loaned at the end of the 1990s at Dinamo București for a few matches in Continental Shield. Soon after he signed with RC Strasbourg in France. After his stint with French rugby followed a transfer in Ireland, where he played for De La Salle Palmerston for five seasons. He ended his career in 2008 after playing for three seasons at a hospital's rugby union team, his workplace then.

== International career ==
Vioreanu gathered 30 caps for Romania, from his debut in 1994 against England to his last game in 2003 against Namibia. He was a member of his national side for the 5th and 6th Rugby World Cups in 1999 and 2003. In 1999 he played three matches in the East Group against Australia, USA and Ireland. In 2003 he played all four matches in Pool A against Ireland, Australia, Argentina and Namibia, which was also his final match for the Oaks. He scored nine tries for his national team, 45 points on aggregate.

== Career outside rugby ==
In 1999, Vioreanu graduated from the Victor Babeș University of Medicine and Pharmacy in Timișoara with honours. He then soon moved to France and just after 9 months to Ireland, where he continued his postgraduate training. He currently resides in Dublin and holds dual citizenship (Romanian and Irish).

Freshly moved to Dublin, he completed his specialtist training in Orthopaedic Surgery at RCSI. He pursued further sub-specialized training in primary, complex and revision hip and knee replacement at the Arthroplasty Centre in Vancouver, Canada. He then travelled to Sydney, Australia during 2013 and 2014 to perform sports knee surgery (i.e. ACL reconstruction, tibial osteotomies, cartilage and meniscal surgery) alongside Professors Justin Roe and Leo Pinczewski. In 2014, he was awarded the Asia Pacific ESSKA–APKASS Travelling Fellowship facilitating him to visit centres in sports knee surgery in the Asia-Pacific region. In 2017, he was awarded the European ESSKA Osteotomy Traveling Fellowship where he visited high volume joint-preserving centres in Europe.

Vioreanu is involved in clinical research and has published a number of clinical studies, book chapters and surgical techniques.

Vioreanu joined the Sports Surgery Clinic in 2014, and later the Mater Private Hospital.

== Honours ==
Romania

- Rugby Europe International Championships Winner: 2000
