= Morné Schreuder =

Namibia international rugby union player

- Born: September 5, 1979 (age 47)
- Height: 1.83 m (6 ft 0 in)
- Weight: 84 kg (185 lb; 13 st 3 lb)

Rugby union career
- Position: Fly-half
International career
Years	Team	Apps	(Points)
2005–present	Namibia	19	(146)

Morné Schreuder (born 5 September 1979 in Windhoek) is a Namibian rugby union fly half. Schreuder competed for the Namibia national rugby union team at the 2007 Rugby World Cup.
