= Hakkies Husselman =

Namibia international rugby union player

- Born: 3 November 1972 (age 54)
- Height: 1.79 m (5 ft 10 1/2 in)
- Weight: 88 kg (194 lb; 13 st 12 lb)

Rugby union career
- Position: Scrum-half
Senior career
Years	Team	Apps	(Points)
- Western Province
International career
Years	Team	Apps	(Points)
1993–2003	Namibia	10	(20)
Coaching career
- Years: Team
- 2007: Namibia

Dawid Husselman, better known as Hakkies Husselman (born 3 November 1972), is a Namibian rugby union former international player and a current coach. He played as a scrum-half.

== Career ==
=== Player ===
He played for Western Province in South Africa. His first match for Namibia was on 3 July 1993, with AGRU, in a 64–20 win.

Husselman was present at the 2003 Rugby World Cup finals, playing three games. He had 10 caps for his country, with 4 tries scored, 20 points in aggregate.

=== Coach ===
He latter became a coach, and was nominated coach of Namibia at 27 June 2007, for the 2007 Rugby World Cup finals. Namibia lost all four games, but did a convincing performance at the 17–32 loss to Ireland. He applied to remain in office after the World Cup but was dismissed.

== Notes ==
Sporting positions
Preceded by (Namibia) Johan Venter	Namibia National Rugby Union Coach; 2007–2007	Succeeded by (Namibia) Johan Diergaardt
