= Petrișor Toderașc =

- Born: 15 July 1980 (age 46)
- Height: 1.85 m (6 ft 1 in)
- Weight: 113 kg (249 lb; 17.8 st)

Rugby union career
- Position: Prop
International career
Years	Team	Apps	(Points)
2000-2009	Romania	50	(40)

Petrişor Toderaşc (born 15 July 1980 in Iași) is a Romanian former rugby union footballer who played as a prop.

Toderaşc played in France for Oyonnax (2004/05), CA Brive (2005/10) and Stade Rochelais (2010/13).

He has 50 caps for Romania, with 8 tries and 40 points scored, since his first match, a 37-17 loss to Italy, at 18 November 2000. He represented Romania twice at the Rugby World Cup finals, playing four matches in 2003, where he scored a try in the 90-8 loss to Australia, and two in 2007. His most recent match for the "Oaks" was at the 42-0 loss to Scotland, at 18 September 2007, at the Rugby World Cup finals. Toderaşc was absent from his National Team until 28 November 2009, playing as a replacement in the 18-29 loss do Fiji, in a friendly match, in Bucharest.
