= David Waterston (rugby union) =

NZ rugby union coach

Rugby union career
- Position: Coach
Coaching career
- Years: Team
- 1999: Tonga
- 2003: Namibia

David Waterston is a New Zealand rugby union coach. David was appointed in 1995 by the South African Rugby Union as technical analyst, and worked with legendary coach Kitch Christie. Waterston and Christie led the Springboks to become the first African country to win a Webb Ellis Cup title. Waterston was famous for his tactics and was a key in the Springboks against New Zealand and the Australian team in the same year, which were both expected to win the 1995 Rugby World Cup.

He was briefly in charge of Tonga, in 1999. Later, he became coach of Namibia for the 2003 Rugby World Cup finals. In the tournament Namibia lost all the four matches, and reached a loss record of 142–0 to Australia. During the 2003 Rugby World Cup, Waterston faced sanctions from the International Rugby Board after claiming that referees favoured the senior established teams over the emerging countries such as Namibia.

After retiring from professional coaching, Waterston continued his role of CEO at W4 Group, a specialised insurance risk administrator and broker company.
