= Valentin Maftei =

Romanian rugby union player

- Born: Valentin Dimian Maftei; 26 September 1974 (age 52) Săgeata, Romania
- Height: 6 ft 1 in (185 cm)
- Weight: 187 lb (85 kg)

Rugby union career
- Position: Fullback
Youth career
- CSȘ Constanța
Senior career
Years	Team	Apps	(Points)
1993–1998	U Cluj		
1998–2000	Mirano		
2000–2008	Aurillac		
2008–2010	Figeac		
2010–2013	Mauriac		
International career
Years	Team	Apps	(Points)
1995–2006	Romania	42	(44)

Valentin Dimian Maftei (born 26 September 1974) is a Romanian former rugby union player. He played as a fullback.

== Club career ==
During his career, Maftei played for Universitatea Cluj in Romania, Mirano in Italy and for Aurillac, Figeac and Mauriac, all in France.

== International career ==
Maftei gathered 42 caps for Romania, from his debut in 1995 to his last game in 2006. He scored 7 tries, 3 conversions and one drop-goal, 44 points on aggregate. He was a member of his national side for the 6th Rugby World Cup in 2003, where he played four matches in Pool A against Ireland, Wallabies, Argentina and Namibia and scored one try against Ireland.
