= Sorin Socol =

Romania international rugby union player

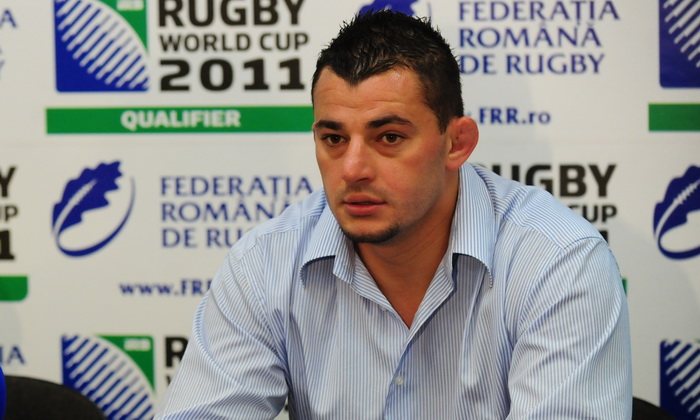
- Socol in 2010
- Born: 30 November 1977 (age 48) Bucharest, Romania
- Height: 1.96 m (6 ft 5 in)
- Weight: 115 kg (254 lb)
- University: Business school of the Brive Chamber of Commerce

Rugby union career
- Position: Lock
Senior career
Years	Team	Apps	(Points)
1996–2003	Brive		
2003–2007	Agen		
2007–2009	Pau		
2009–2010	FC Oloron		
2010–2012	FC Lourdes		
International career
Years	Team	Apps	(Points)
2001–2011	Romania	61	(40)

Sorin Socol (born 30 November 1977 in Bucharest) is a Romanian retired rugby union player who played as a lock.

He has won 61 caps for Romania. After being voted player of the tournament in the 1996 Under 21 Rugby World Championships where he captained Romania, Socol has played club rugby in France. He moved to France just prior to the tournament and studied business while playing for Brive. He played for Brive's top squad for seven years between 1996 and 2003.

Socol made his international debut for Romania against Spain on 18 February 2001. At the beginning of the 2003/2004 season he moved to Agen where he played in the Top 14 and Heineken Cup. He captained Romania for the first time on 30 October 2003 during the 2003 World Cup match against Namibia. After leaving Agen in 2007 he played for Pau in France's Pro D2 for the 2007/2008 season. He also captained Romania in the 2007 World Cup finals.
