= Emile Wessels =

Namibia international rugby union player

- Born: Emile Wessels; June 27, 1979 (age 47) Windhoek, Namibia
- Height: 1.8 m (5 ft 11 in)

Rugby union career
- Position: Fly-half
International career
Years	Team	Apps	(Points)
2002–present	Namibia	9	(40)
- Correct as of September 9, 2007

Emile Wessels (born 27 June 1979) is a rugby union player who plays for Namibia. Wessels plays as a fly-half, specialising in kicking. He made his international debut in October 2002 in a friendly match against Tunisia. He played four matches at the 2003 Rugby World Cup finals and two matches the 2007 Rugby World Cup finals. Wessels was born in Windhoek.
