= George Chiriac =

Romanian rugby union player

- Born: George Chiriac; 30 October 1979 (age 47) Bârlad, Romania
- Height: 6 ft 3 in (191 cm)
- Weight: 210 lb (95 kg)

Rugby union career
- Position: Flanker
Senior career
Years	Team	Apps	(Points)
- RC Bârlad
- Politehnica Iași
- Farul Constanța
2005	Rumilly		
2007–2008	RC Orléans		
2009–2011	RC Compiégnois		
2012–?	RC Beauvais		
International career
Years	Team	Apps	(Points)
1996–2003	Romania	20	(10)

George Chiriac (born 30 October 1979 in Bârlad) is a former Romanian rugby union player. He played as a flanker.

== Club career ==
During his career, Chiriac played for RC Bârlad, Politehnica Iași, RCJ Farul Constanța in Romania and for Rumilly, RC Orléans, RC Compiégnois and RC Beauvais in France.

== International career ==
Chiriac gathered 20 caps for Romania, from his debut in 1996 against Belgium to his last game in 2003 against Namibia. He was a member of his national side for the 6th Rugby World Cup in 2003, where he played all four matches in Pool A against Ireland, Australia, Argentina and Namibia, which was also his final match for the Oaks. He scored two tries for his national team, 10 points on aggregate.
