= Ionuț Tofan =

Romanian retired rugby union player

- Born: Ionuț Răzvan Tofan; 8 March 1977 (age 49) Bucharest, Romania
- Height: 1.78 m (5 ft 10 in)
- Weight: 77 kg (170 lb)

Rugby union career
- Position: Fly-half
Youth career
- 1989–1996: CS Triumf București
Senior career
Years	Team	Apps	(Points)
1996–2002	Steaua Bucharest		
2002–2005	Racing Métro		
2005–2008	USA Limoges		
2008–2009	Le Bugue AC		
2009–2010	Castelnaudary		
International career
Years	Team	Apps	(Points)
1997–2007	Romania	60	(316)

Ionuț Răzvan Tofan (born 8 March 1977 in Bucharest) is a Romanian former rugby union footballer. A fly-half, he made his international debut in 1997 and was the Romanian national team's goalkicker during their 2003 World Cup campaign. He has scored 316 points in tests for his country.

== Honours ==
=== Club ===
Steaua Bucharest
SuperLiga champion: 1998/99

=== International ===
Romania
European Nations Cup: 2000, 2002
