= Heino Senekal =

Namibian rugby union player (born 1975)

- Born: October 20, 1975 (age 51) Tsumeb
- Height: 1.98 m (6 ft 6 in)
- Weight: 118 kg (260 lb; 18.6 st)

Rugby union career
- Position: Lock
International career
Years	Team	Apps	(Points)
1998–2007	Namibia	27	(10)

Johannes Hendrik "Heino" Senekal (born 20 October 1975 in Tsumeb) is a retired Namibian rugby union lock. Senekal competed for the Namibia national rugby union team at the 1999 Rugby World Cup finals, 2003 Rugby World Cup finals and the 2007 Rugby World Cup finals, playing 10 matches in aggregate.

He was a member of the Welsh team Cardiff Blues in the Celtic League and the Cornish Pirates, from Cornwall.

Senekal attended high school at Windhoek High School in Windhoek then later at Sentraal High School in Bloemfontein, South Africa.
