= Augustin Petrechei =

- Born: 4 August 1980 (age 46)
- Height: 1.98 m (6 ft 6 in)
- Weight: 108 kg (238 lb; 17.0 st)

Rugby union career
- Position: Lock
International career
Years	Team	Apps	(Points)
2002-2009	Romania	21	(10)

Augustin Simion Petrechei (born 4 August 1980 in Constanța) is a Romanian rugby union player. He plays as a lock.

Petrechei has been playing in France for USA Perpignan (2004/05), AS Béziers Hérault (2005/06-2008/09), US Marmande (2009/10) and for CA Périgueux, since 2010/11.

Petrechei had 21 caps for Romania, from 2002 to 2009, scoring 2 tries, 10 points on aggregate. Petrechei first game was at 7 September 2002, in a 39-8 loss to Ireland, in Limerick, in a friendly match. He was called for the 2003 Rugby World Cup, playing in three games and scoring a try. He would be called once again to the 2007 Rugby World Cup, but he never played. His most recent game was at 28 November 2009, in the 28-19 loss to Fiji, in Bucharest, in a tour friendly.
