= Lucian Sîrbu =

Romania international rugby union player

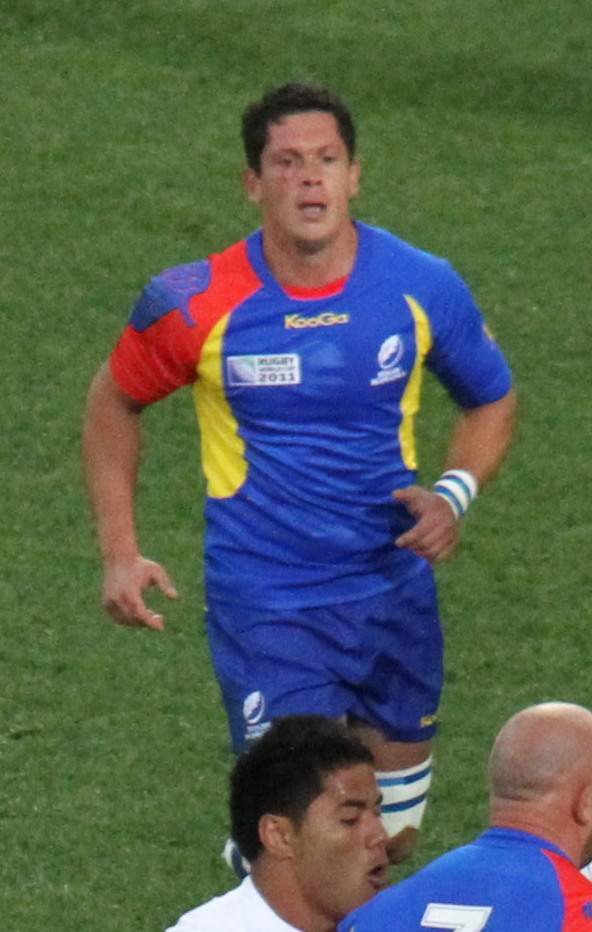
- Sîrbu during 2011 RWC
- Born: Lucian Mihai Sirbu; 16 October 1976 (age 50)
- Height: 6 ft 0 in (1.83 m)
- Weight: 190 lb (86 kg; 14 st)

Rugby union career
- Position: Scrumhalf
International career
Years	Team	Apps	(Points)
1996–2011	Romania	76	(45)

Lucian Sîrbu (born 16 October 1976 in Bucharest) is a former Romanian rugby union footballer. He played as a scrum-half.

Sîrbu played at Grivița Roșie and Steaua București, in Romania, until moving to Racing Métro 92, in France. He moved to AS Béziers, in 2007.

He had his first cap for Romania, at 20 February 2000, in a 39–10 win over the Netherlands. He was selected for the 2003 Rugby World Cup finals, playing all the four matches and scoring a try, and for the 2007 Rugby World Cup finals, playing again in all the four matches.

Sîrbu had 76 caps, from 1996 to 2011, with 9 tries scored, 45 points in aggregate.
