= Ion Teodorescu =

- Born: 27 July 1976 (age 50)
- Height: 1.75 m (5 ft 9 in)
- Weight: 80 kg (176 lb; 12 st 8 lb)

Rugby union career
- Position: Wing
Senior career
Years	Team	Apps	(Points)
- SU Agen
International career
Years	Team	Apps	(Points)
2001-2007	Romania	40	(65)

Ion Teodorescu (born 27 July 1976 in Bucharest) is a Romanian rugby union player. He plays as a wing.

He played in France for SU Agen and in Romania for Contor Arad.

Teodorescu had 39 caps for Romania, from 2001 to 2007, scoring 13 tries, 65 points in aggregate. He played four matches at the 2003 Rugby World Cup, scoring a try. He was selected for the 2007 Rugby World Cup but was never used. Teodorescu has been absent from his national team since then.
