= 2007 Rugby World Cup Pool D =

Pool D of the 2007 Rugby World Cup began on 7 September and concluded on 30 September. The pool was composed of World Cup hosts France, Argentina, Georgia, Ireland and Namibia.

== Standings ==
Pool D was expected to be the Pool of Death in the 2007 tournament and so it proved: the final rankings were only determined after the last round of matches. The pool was won by Argentina, who won all their matches, while France, who lost to Argentina in the opening game of the tournament, finished in second place. Ireland, whom many commentators had expected to do well, were eliminated after winning only two matches, against Georgia and Namibia: Georgia came close to scoring a winning try late in their game, while Namibia recorded their best World Cup result against a team ranked in the top 10.

Pos	Team	Pld	W	D	L	PF	PA	PD	B	Pts	Qualification
1	Argentina	4	4	0	0	143	33	+110	2	18	Qualified for the quarter-finals
2	France	4	3	0	1	188	37	+151	3	15	Qualified for the quarter-finals
3	Ireland	4	2	0	2	64	82	−18	1	9	Eliminated, automatic qualification for RWC 2011
4	Georgia	4	1	0	3	50	111	−61	1	5	
5	Namibia	4	0	0	4	30	212	−182	0	0	

== Matches ==
All times local (UTC+2)

=== France vs Argentina ===
7 September 2007
21:00

France	12–17	Argentina
Pen: Skrela (4/5) 7', 31', 40+', 60'	Report	Try: Corleto 27' m Pen: F. Contepomi (4/6) 5', 10', 24', 34'

Stade de France, Saint-Denis
Attendance: 79,312
Referee: Tony Spreadbury (England)

FB	15	Cédric Heymans
RW	14	Aurélien Rougerie
OC	13	Yannick Jauzion
IC	12	Damien Traille	16' to 24'
LW	11	Christophe Dominici
FH	10	David Skrela			(substituted off) 62'
SH	9	Pierre Mignoni	(substituted off) 73'
N8	8	Imanol Harinordoquy
OF	7	Rémy Martin	(substituted off) 60'
BF	6	Serge Betsen
RL	5	Jérôme Thion
LL	4	Fabien Pelous	(substituted off) 60'
TP	3	Pieter de Villiers
HK	2	Raphaël Ibañez (c)	(substituted off) 60'
LP	1	Olivier Milloud
Replacements:
HK	16	Dimitri Szarzewski	(substituted in) 60'
PR	17	Jean-Baptiste Poux
LK	18	Sébastien Chabal	(substituted in) 60'
N8	19	Julien Bonnaire	(substituted in) 60'
FL	20	Thierry Dusautoir
SH	21	Jean-Baptiste Élissalde	(substituted in) 73'
FH	22	Frédéric Michalak	(substituted in) 16'	(substituted off) 24'	(substituted in) 62'
Coach:
Bernard Laporte

FB	15	Ignacio Corleto
RW	14	Lucas Borges
OC	13	Manuel Contepomi	48' to 50'		(substituted off) 73'
IC	12	Felipe Contepomi
LW	11	Horacio Agulla
FH	10	Juan Martín Hernández
SH	9	Agustín Pichot (c)
N8	8	Juan Manuel Leguizamón
OF	7	Juan Martín Fernández Lobbe
BF	6	Lucas Ostiglia	(substituted off) 72'
RL	5	Patricio Albacete
LL	4	Ignacio Fernández Lobbe	(substituted off) 28'
TP	3	Martín Scelzo	(substituted off) 64'
HK	2	Mario Ledesma
LP	1	Rodrigo Roncero
Replacements:
HK	16	Alberto Vernet Basualdo
PR	17	Santiago González Bonorino	(substituted in) 64'
LK	18	Rimas Álvarez Kairelis	(substituted in) 28'
FL	19	Martín Durand	(substituted in) 72'
SH	20	Nicolás Fernández Miranda
FH	21	Federico Todeschini
CE	22	Hernán Senillosa	(substituted in) 48'	(substituted off) 50'	(substituted in) 73'
Coach:
Marcelo Loffreda

Man of the Match:
Felipe Contepomi (Argentina)

Touch judges:
Stuart Dickinson (Australia)
Bryce Lawrence (New Zealand)
Television match official:
Marius Jonker (South Africa)
Fourth official:
Alain Rolland (Ireland)
Fifth official:
Eric Gauzins (France)

Notes

- This was the third consecutive World Cup in which Argentina played the tournament host in the competition's opening match. In 1999, the Pumas lost 23–18 to Wales and in 2003 lost 24–8 to Australia.
- The three points from Skrela's second half penalty is the lowest points total in a half in World Cup history.
- This was the second consecutive world cup match (following the 2003 final), in which the winner was scoreless in the second half.
- This was the fifth win for Argentina in their last six Tests against France, whose sole win in November 2006 was by one point.
- Argentina became the second side to beat the hosts in the opening match, after New Zealand beat England in 1991 at Twickenham.
- It was France's first defeat in the first round of the World Cup (although they had a 20–20 draw against Scotland in 1987). Only New Zealand continued to have a 100% record in the first round after 2007, until the loss versus France in the opening match of 2023 Rugby World Cup.

=== Ireland vs Namibia ===
9 September 2007
20:00

Ireland	32–17	Namibia
Try: O'Driscoll 5' c Trimble 19' m Easterby 30' m Penalty try 49' c Flannery 76' m Con: O'Gara (2/5); Pen: O'Gara (1/1) 17'	Report	Try: Nieuwenhuis 60' c Van Zyl 64' c Con: Wessels (2/2); Pen: Wessels (1/2) 40+'

Stade Chaban-Delmas, Bordeaux
Attendance: 33,694
Referee: Joël Jutge (France)

FB	15	Girvan Dempsey
RW	14	Andrew Trimble
OC	13	Brian O'Driscoll (c)	(substituted off) 80+'
IC	12	Gordon D'Arcy
LW	11	Denis Hickie
FH	10	Ronan O'Gara	(substituted off) 80'
SH	9	Peter Stringer
N8	8	Denis Leamy
OF	7	David Wallace	(substituted off) 69'
BF	6	Simon Easterby
RL	5	Paul O'Connell
LL	4	Donncha O'Callaghan
TP	3	John Hayes
HK	2	Rory Best	(substituted off) 62'
LP	1	Marcus Horan	(substituted off) 62'
Replacements:
HK	16	Jerry Flannery	(substituted in) 62'
PR	17	Simon Best	(substituted in) 62'
LK	18	Malcolm O'Kelly
FL	19	Neil Best	(substituted in) 69'
SH	20	Isaac Boss
FH	21	Paddy Wallace	(substituted in) 80'
FB	22	Geordan Murphy	(substituted in) 80+'
Coach:
Eddie O'Sullivan

FB	15	Tertius Losper
RW	14	Ryan Witbooi	(substituted off) 80+'
OC	13	Bradley Langenhoven
IC	12	Piet van Zyl
LW	11	Heini Bock
FH	10	Emile Wessels
SH	9	Eugene Jantjies	(substituted off) 51'
N8	8	Jacques Burger	66' to 69'
OF	7	Heino Senekal	(substituted off) 22'
BF	6	Jacques Nieuwenhuis
RL	5	Nico Esterhuyse
LL	4	Wacca Kazombiaze
TP	3	Jané du Toit
HK	2	Hugo Horn	(substituted off) 77'
LP	1	Kees Lensing (c)	(substituted off) 50'	(substituted in) 78'
Replacements:
HK	16	Johannes Meyer	(substituted in) 77'
PR	17	Johnny Redelinghuys	(substituted in) 50'	(substituted off) 78'
FL	18	Michael MacKenzie	(substituted in) 22'
FL	19	Tinus du Plessis	(substituted in) 66'	(substituted off) 69'
SH	20	Jurie van Tonder	(substituted in) 51'
CE	21	Lu-Wayne Botes
WG	22	Melrick Africa	(substituted in) 80+'
Coach:
Hakkies Husselman

Man of the Match:
Ryan Witbooi (Namibia)

Touch judges:
Federico Cuesta (Argentina)
Malcolm Changleng (Scotland)
Television match official:
Paul Marks (Australia)
Fourth official:
Romain Poite (France)
Fifth official:
Stephane Pomarede (France)

Notes

- Brian O'Driscoll took sole possession of the all-time Ireland try-scoring lead from teammate Denis Hickie with his 30th try.
- This was Namibia's best result in a World Cup match, surpassing a thirty-point defeat to Romania in 2003.

=== Argentina vs Georgia ===
11 September 2007
20:00

Argentina	33–3	Georgia
Try: Borges (2) 47' c, 56' m Albacete 72' m Martin Aramburu 80' c Con: F. Contepomi (1/3); Hernández (1/1); Pen: F. Contepomi (3/3) 12', 35', 54'	Report	Pen: Kvirikashvili (1/2) 2'

Stade de Gerland, Lyon
Attendance: 40,240
Referee: Nigel Owens (Wales)

FB	15	Ignacio Corleto
RW	14	Lucas Borges			(substituted off) 69'
OC	13	Gonzalo Tiesi	44' to 45'
IC	12	Felipe Contepomi (c)	(substituted off) 74'
LW	11	Federico Martín Aramburú
FH	10	Juan Martín Hernández
SH	9	Nicolás Fernández Miranda
N8	8	Juan Manuel Leguizamón	(substituted off) 61'
OF	7	Juan Martín Fernández Lobbe
BF	6	Martín Durand
RL	5	Patricio Albacete
LL	4	Rimas Álvarez Kairelis	44' to 45'		(substituted off) 68'
TP	3	Santiago González Bonorino	(substituted off) 45'
HK	2	Mario Ledesma	(substituted off) 68'
LP	1	Marcos Ayerza
Replacements:
HK	16	Alberto Vernet Basualdo	(substituted in) 68'
PR	17	Omar Hasan	(substituted in) 45'
LK	18	Esteban Lozada	(substituted in) 44'	(substituted off) 45'	(substituted in) 68'
FL	19	Martín Schusterman	(substituted in) 61'
CE	20	Hernán Senillosa	(substituted in) 44'	(substituted off) 45'	(substituted in) 69'
FH	21	Federico Todeschini	(substituted in) 74'
FB	22	Federico Serra Miras
Coach:
Marcelo Loffreda

FB	15	Pavle Jimsheladze	(substituted off) 59'
RW	14	Irakli Machkhaneli
OC	13	Malkhaz Urjukashvili	(substituted off) 74'
IC	12	Irakli Giorgadze
LW	11	Besiki Khamashuridze
FH	10	Merab Kvirikashvili
SH	9	Irakli Abuseridze	(substituted off) 64'
N8	8	Besso Udessiani	(substituted off) 65'
OF	7	Grigol Labadze
BF	6	Giorgi Chkhaidze	(substituted off) 50'
RL	5	Mamuka Gorgodze
LL	4	Ilia Zedginidze (c)
TP	3	David Zirakashvili	(substituted off) 41'
HK	2	Akvsenti Giorgadze
LP	1	David Khinchagashvili	(substituted off) 63'
Replacements:
PR	16	Goderdzi Shvelidze	(substituted in) 63'
PR	17	Avtandil Kopaliani	(substituted in) 41'
LK	18	Victor Didebulidze	(substituted in) 65'
FL	19	Zviad Maisuradze	(substituted in) 50'
SH	20	Bidzina Samkharadze	(substituted in) 64'
CE	21	Revaz Gigauri	(substituted in) 74'
WG	22	Giorgi Shkinin	(substituted in) 59'
Coach:
Malkhaz Cheishvili

Man of the Match:
Juan Martín Fernández Lobbe (Argentina)

Touch judges:
Simon McDowell (Ireland)
Dave Pearson (England)
Television match official:
Hugh Watkins (Wales)
Fourth official:
Alan Lewis (Ireland)
Fifth official:
Laurent Valin (France)

=== Ireland vs Georgia ===
15 September 2007
21:00

Ireland	14–10	Georgia
Try: R. Best 17' c Dempsey 55' c Con: O'Gara (2/2)	Report	Try: Shkinin 45' c Con: Kvirikashvili (1/1); Pen: Kvirikashvili (1/2) 37'

Stade Chaban-Delmas, Bordeaux
Attendance: 33,807
Referee: Wayne Barnes (England)

FB	15	Girvan Dempsey
RW	14	Shane Horgan
OC	13	Brian O'Driscoll (c)
IC	12	Gordon D'Arcy
LW	11	Denis Hickie
FH	10	Ronan O'Gara
SH	9	Peter Stringer		(substituted off) 70'
N8	8	Denis Leamy
OF	7	David Wallace	(yellow card) 37'
BF	6	Simon Easterby		(substituted off) 73'
RL	5	Paul O'Connell
LL	4	Donncha O'Callaghan
TP	3	John Hayes		(substituted off) 66'
HK	2	Rory Best		(substituted off) 53'
LP	1	Marcus Horan
Replacements:
HK	16	Jerry Flannery		(substituted in) 53'
PR	17	Simon Best		(substituted in) 66'
LK	18	Malcolm O'Kelly
FL	19	Neil Best		(substituted in) 73'
SH	20	Isaac Boss		(substituted in) 70'
FH	21	Paddy Wallace
FB	22	Geordan Murphy
Coach:
Eddie O'Sullivan

FB	15	Otar Barkalaia	(substituted off) 34'
RW	14	Giorgi Shkinin
OC	13	Malkhaz Urjukashvili
IC	12	Davit Kacharava
LW	11	Giorgi Elizbarashvili	(substituted off) 51'
FH	10	Merab Kvirikashvili
SH	9	Bidzina Samkharadze	(substituted off) 72'
N8	8	Giorgi Chkhaidze
OF	7	Rati Urushadze
BF	6	Ilia Maisuradze	(substituted off) 58'
RL	5	Mamuka Gorgodze
LL	4	Ilia Zedginidze (c)	(substituted off) 32'
TP	3	Avtandil Kopaliani	(substituted off) 48'
HK	2	Goderdzi Shvelidze
LP	1	Mamuka Magrakvelidze	(substituted off) 48'
Replacements:
HK	16	Akvsenti Giorgadze	(substituted in) 48'
PR	17	David Khinchagashvili	(substituted in) 48'
LK	18	Levan Datunashvili	(substituted in) 32'
FL	19	Zviad Maisuradze	(substituted in) 58'
SH	20	Irakli Abuseridze	(substituted in) 72'
CE	21	Irakli Machkhaneli	(substituted in) 34'
WG	22	Otar Eloshvili	(substituted in) 51'
Coach:
Malkhaz Cheishvili

Man of the Match:
Giorgi Shkinin (Georgia)

Touch judges:
Malcolm Changleng (Scotland)
Paul Marks (Australia)
Television match official:
Federico Cuesta (Argentina)
Fourth official:
Nigel Owens (Wales)
Fifth official:
Hervé Dubes (France)

=== France vs Namibia ===
16 September 2007
21:00

France	87–10	Namibia
Try: Heymans 7' m Marty 11' c Dusautoir 21' c Nallet (2) 32' c, 40+' c Clerc (3) 38' c, 59' c, 65' c Bonnaire 47' c Chabal (2) 49' c, 54' c Élissalde 56' c Ibañez 75' m Con: Élissalde (11/13)	Report	Try: Langenhoven 79' c Con: Losper (1/1); Drop: Wessels (1/1) 10'

Stadium de Toulouse, Toulouse
Attendance: 35,339
Referee: Alain Rolland (Ireland)

FB	15	Clément Poitrenaud	(substituted off) 65'
RW	14	Vincent Clerc
OC	13	David Marty
IC	12	Damien Traille	(substituted off) 51'
LW	11	Cédric Heymans
FH	10	Frédéric Michalak	(substituted off) 63'
SH	9	Jean-Baptiste Élissalde (c)
N8	8	Julien Bonnaire
OF	7	Thierry Dusautoir
BF	6	Yannick Nyanga	(substituted off) 54'
RL	5	Lionel Nallet
LL	4	Sébastien Chabal	(substituted off) 58'
TP	3	Pieter de Villiers	(substituted off) 42'
HK	2	Dimitri Szarzewski	(substituted off) 58'
LP	1	Jean-Baptiste Poux
Replacements:
HK	16	Raphaël Ibañez	(substituted in) 58'
PR	17	Nicolas Mas	(substituted in) 42'
LK	18	Fabien Pelous	(substituted in) 58'
N8	19	Imanol Harinordoquy	(substituted in) 54'
FH	20	Lionel Beauxis	(substituted in) 63'
CE	21	Yannick Jauzion	(substituted in) 51'
WG	22	Aurélien Rougerie	(substituted in) 65'
Coach:
Bernard Laporte

FB	15	Tertius Losper
RW	14	Ryan Witbooi
OC	13	Bradley Langenhoven
IC	12	Piet van Zyl		(substituted off) 66'
LW	11	Heini Bock
FH	10	Emile Wessels		(substituted off) 12'
SH	9	Jurie van Tonder		(substituted off) 41'
N8	8	Jacques Nieuwenhuis	(red card) 19'
OF	7	Jacques Burger		(substituted off) 57'
BF	6	Michael MacKenzie
RL	5	Nico Esterhuyse		(substituted off) 57'
LL	4	Wacca Kazombiaze
TP	3	Jané du Toit			(substituted off) 68'
HK	2	Hugo Horn		(substituted off) 65'
LP	1	Kees Lensing (c)		(substituted off) 57'	(substituted in) 68'
Replacements:
HK	16	Johannes Meyer		(substituted in) 65'
PR	17	Johnny Redelinghuys		(substituted in) 57'
FL	18	Herman Lintvelt		(substituted in) 57'
FL	19	Tinus du Plessis		(substituted in) 57'
SH	20	Eugene Jantjies		(substituted in) 41'
CE	21	Lu-Wayne Botes		(substituted in) 12'
WG	22	Melrick Africa		(substituted in) 66'
Coach:
Hakkies Husselman

Man of the Match:
Jean-Baptiste Élissalde (France)

Touch judges:
Kelvin Deaker (New Zealand)
Carlo Damasco (Italy)
Television match official:
Simon McDowell (Ireland)
Fourth official:
Paul Honiss (New Zealand)
Fifth official:
Jean-Luc Rebollal (France)

=== France vs Ireland ===
21 September 2007
21:00

France	25–3	Ireland
Try: Clerc (2) 59' m, 69' m Pen: Élissalde (5/6) 7', 18', 22', 40+', 55'	Report	Drop: O'Gara (1/1) 37'

Stade de France, Saint-Denis
Attendance: 80,267
Referee: Chris White (England)

FB	15	Clément Poitrenaud		(substituted off) 72'
RW	14	Vincent Clerc
OC	13	David Marty		(substituted off) 74'
IC	12	Damien Traille	(yellow card) 76'
LW	11	Cédric Heymans
FH	10	Frédéric Michalak
SH	9	Jean-Baptiste Élissalde		(substituted off) 74'
N8	8	Julien Bonnaire
OF	7	Thierry Dusautoir
BF	6	Serge Betsen		(substituted off) 62'
RL	5	Jérôme Thion
LL	4	Sébastien Chabal		(substituted off) 46'
TP	3	Pieter de Villiers
HK	2	Raphaël Ibañez (c)		(substituted off) 57'
LP	1	Olivier Milloud		(substituted off) 74'
Replacements:
HK	16	Dimitri Szarzewski		(substituted in) 57'
PR	17	Jean-Baptiste Poux		(substituted in) 74'
LK	18	Lionel Nallet		(substituted in) 46'
FL	19	Yannick Nyanga		(substituted in) 62'
FH	20	Lionel Beauxis		(substituted in) 74'
CE	21	Yannick Jauzion		(substituted in) 74'
WG	22	Aurélien Rougerie		(substituted in) 72'
Coach:
Bernard Laporte

FB	15	Girvan Dempsey
RW	14	Shane Horgan
OC	13	Brian O'Driscoll (c)
IC	12	Gordon D'Arcy
LW	11	Andrew Trimble
FH	10	Ronan O'Gara
SH	9	Eoin Reddan
N8	8	Denis Leamy
OF	7	David Wallace
BF	6	Simon Easterby		(substituted off) 73'
RL	5	Paul O'Connell	(yellow card) 64'
LL	4	Donncha O'Callaghan		(substituted off) 72'
TP	3	John Hayes		(substituted off) 74'
HK	2	Jerry Flannery		50' to 55'		(substituted off) 78'
LP	1	Marcus Horan
Replacements:
HK	16	Frankie Sheahan		(substituted in) 50'	(substituted off) 55'	(substituted in) 78'
PR	17	Simon Best		(substituted in) 74'
LK	18	Malcolm O'Kelly		(substituted in) 72'
FL	19	Neil Best		(substituted in) 73'
SH	20	Isaac Boss
FH	21	Paddy Wallace
CE	22	Gavin Duffy
Coach:
Eddie O'Sullivan

Man of the Match:
Jean-Baptiste Élissalde (France)

Touch judges:
Hugh Watkins (Wales)
Dave Pearson (England)
Television match official:
Jonathan Kaplan (South Africa)
Fourth official:
Nigel Owens (Wales)
Fifth official:
Eric Gauzins (France)

=== Argentina vs Namibia ===
22 September 2007
21:00

Argentina	63–3	Namibia
Try: Roncero 25' c Leguizamón (2) 35' m, 52' c M. Contepomi 38' c F. Contepomi 45' c Tiesi 55' m Corleto 58' m Penalty try 63' c Todeschini 71' c Con: Contepomi (4/7); Todeschini (2/2); Pen: F. Contepomi (2/2) 10', 20'	Report	Pen: Schreuder (1/1) 7'

Stade Vélodrome, Marseille
Attendance: 55,067
Referee: Stuart Dickinson (Australia)

FB	15	Ignacio Corleto	(substituted off) 65'
RW	14	Hernán Senillosa
OC	13	Gonzalo Tiesi
IC	12	Manuel Contepomi
LW	11	Horacio Agulla
FH	10	Felipe Contepomi	(substituted off) 59'
SH	9	Agustín Pichot (c)	(substituted off) 56'
N8	8	Juan Manuel Leguizamón	(substituted off) 59'
OF	7	Juan Martín Fernández Lobbe
BF	6	Lucas Ostiglia
RL	5	Patricio Albacete
LL	4	Ignacio Fernández Lobbe	(substituted off) 66'
TP	3	Omar Hasan
HK	2	Alberto Vernet Basualdo
LP	1	Rodrigo Roncero	(substituted off) 66'
Replacements:
HK	16	Mario Ledesma
PR	17	Martín Scelzo	(substituted in) 66'
LK	18	Rimas Álvarez Kairelis	(substituted in) 66'
FL	19	Gonzalo Longo	(substituted in) 59'
SH	20	Nicolás Fernández Miranda	(substituted in) 56'
FH	21	Federico Todeschini	(substituted in) 59'
FB	22	Federico Serra Miras	(substituted in) 65'
Coach:
Marcelo Loffreda

FB	15	Heini Bock
RW	14	Deon Mouton	(substituted off) 53'
OC	13	Du Preez Grobler	(substituted off) 51'
IC	12	Corne Powell (c)
LW	11	Melrick Africa
FH	10	Morne Schreuder	(substituted off) 73'
SH	9	Eugene Jantjies
N8	8	Tinus du Plessis
OF	7	Jacques Burger
BF	6	Michael MacKenzie	(substituted off) 39'
RL	5	Nico Esterhuyse
LL	4	Wacca Kazombiaze	(substituted off) 60'
TP	3	Marius Visser	(substituted off) 41'
HK	2	Johannes Meyer	(substituted off) 41'
LP	1	Johnny Redelinghuys
Replacements:
HK	16	Hugo Horn	(substituted in) 41'
PR	17	Kees Lensing	(substituted in) 41'
FL	18	Herman Lintvelt	(substituted in) 39'
LK	19	Heino Senekal	(substituted in) 60'
SH	20	Jurie van Tonder	(substituted in) 73'
CE	21	Bradley Langenhoven	(substituted in) 53'
CE	22	Piet van Zyl	(substituted in) 51'
Coach:
Hakkies Husselman

Man of the Match:
Rodrigo Roncero (Argentina)

Touch judges:
Carlo Damasco (Italy)
Simon McDowell (Ireland)
Television match official:
Kelvin Deaker (New Zealand)
Fourth official:
Joël Jutge (France)
Fifth official:
Franck Maciello (France)

=== Georgia vs Namibia ===
26 September 2007
18:00

Georgia	30–0	Namibia
Try: Giorgadze 37' c Machkhaneli 70' c Kacharava 80+' c Con: Kvirikashvili (3/3); Pen: Kvirikashvili (3/6) 8', 26', 69'	Report

Stade Félix Bollaert, Lens
Attendance: 32,549
Referee: Steve Walsh (New Zealand)

FB	15	Malkhaz Urjukashvili	(substituted off) 69'
RW	14	Irakli Machkhaneli
OC	13	Davit Kacharava
IC	12	Irakli Giorgadze
LW	11	Giorgi Shkinin	(substituted off) 47'
FH	10	Merab Kvirikashvili
SH	9	Irakli Abuseridze (c)	(substituted off) 56'
N8	8	Giorgi Chkhaidze
OF	7	Rati Urushadze	(substituted off) 51'
BF	6	Grigol Labadze
RL	5	Mamuka Gorgodze	(substituted off) 19'
LL	4	Levan Datunashvili
TP	3	David Zirakashvili
HK	2	Akvsenti Giorgadze	(substituted off) 56'
LP	1	Goderdzi Shvelidze
Replacements:
PR	16	David Khinchagashvili	(substituted in) 56'	(substituted off) 72'
PR	17	Avtandil Kopaliani		(substituted in) 72'
LK	18	Victor Didebulidze	(substituted in) 19'
N8	19	Besso Udessiani	(substituted in) 51'
SH	20	Bidzina Samkharadze	(substituted in) 56'
CE	21	Revaz Gigauri	(substituted in) 69'
WG	22	Besiki Khamashuridze	(substituted in) 47'
Coach:
Malkhaz Cheishvili

FB	15	Heini Bock			(substituted off) 72'
RW	14	Ryan Witbooi
OC	13	Piet van Zyl
IC	12	Corne Powell
LW	11	Bradley Langenhoven
FH	10	Morne Schreuder	(substituted off) 59'
SH	9	Jurie van Tonder	44' to 55'
N8	8	Tinus du Plessis	(substituted off) 41'
OF	7	Jacques Burger
BF	6	Jacques Nieuwenhuis
RL	5	Heino Senekal	(substituted off) 72'
LL	4	Wacca Kazombiaze
TP	3	Marius Visser	(substituted off) 41'
HK	2	Hugo Horn	(substituted off) 70'
LP	1	Kees Lensing (c)
Replacements:
HK	16	Johannes Meyer	(substituted in) 70'
PR	17	Johnny Redelinghuys		(substituted in) 51'
PR	18	Jané du Toit	(substituted in) 41'	(substituted off) 51'
LK	19	Nico Esterhuyse	(substituted in) 41'
SH	20	Eugene Jantjies	(substituted in) 44'	(substituted off) 55'	(substituted in) 72'
WG	21	Melrick Africa	(substituted in) 59'
LK	22	Domingo Kamonga	(substituted in) 72'
Coach:
Hakkies Husselman

Man of the Match:
Merab Kvirikashvili (Georgia)

Touch judges:
Paul Marks (Australia)
Malcolm Changleng (Scotland)
Television match official:
Federico Cuesta (Argentina)
Fourth official:
Alan Lewis (Ireland)
Fifth official:
Bruno Gaudefrin (France)

=== France vs Georgia ===
30 September 2007
15:00

France	64–7	Georgia
Try: Poitrenaud 6' c Nyanga 30' c Beauxis 37' c Dominici (2) 45' m, 57' m Bruno 52' c Nallet 63' c Martin 67' m Bonnaire 80' m Con: Beauxis (5/9); Pen: Beauxis (3/3) 4', 18', 24'	Report	Try: Z. Maisuradze 72' c Con: Urjukashvili (1/1)

Stade Vélodrome, Marseille
Attendance: 58,695
Referee: Alan Lewis (Ireland)

FB	15	Clément Poitrenaud	(substituted off) 73'
RW	14	Aurélien Rougerie
OC	13	David Marty	(substituted off) 58'
IC	12	Yannick Jauzion
LW	11	Christophe Dominici
FH	10	Lionel Beauxis
SH	9	Pierre Mignoni	(substituted off) 21'
N8	8	Julien Bonnaire
OF	7	Yannick Nyanga
BF	6	Serge Betsen (c)	(substituted off) 64'
RL	5	Jérôme Thion	(substituted off) 54'
LL	4	Lionel Nallet
TP	3	Jean-Baptiste Poux	(substituted off) 58'	(substituted in) 73'
HK	2	Sébastien Bruno	(substituted off) 58'
LP	1	Olivier Milloud		(substituted off) 73'
Replacements:
HK	16	Dimitri Szarzewski	(substituted in) 58'
PR	17	Nicolas Mas	(substituted in) 58'
LK	18	Fabien Pelous	(substituted in) 54'
FL	19	Rémy Martin	(substituted in) 64'
SH	20	Jean-Baptiste Élissalde	(substituted in) 21'
FH	21	David Skrela	(substituted in) 58'
WG	22	Vincent Clerc	(substituted in) 73'
Coach:
Bernard Laporte

FB	15	Otar Barkalaia		(substituted off) 54'
RW	14	Malkhaz Urjukashvili
OC	13	Revaz Gigauri	(yellow card) 75'
IC	12	Irakli Giorgadze
LW	11	Besiki Khamashuridze		(substituted off) 54'
FH	10	Merab Kvirikashvili
SH	9	Irakli Abuseridze (c)		(substituted off) 31'
N8	8	Giorgi Chkhaidze
OF	7	Rati Urushadze		33' to 39'
BF	6	Ilia Maisuradze		(substituted off) 49'
RL	5	Zurab Mtchedlishvili
LL	4	Victor Didebulidze		(substituted off) 41'
TP	3	David Zirakashvili
HK	2	Akvsenti Giorgadze
LP	1	Mamuka Magrakvelidze	(yellow card) 29'			(substituted off) 49'
Replacements:
PR	16	Goderdzi Shvelidze		(substituted in) 33'	(substituted off) 39'	(substituted in) 49'
PR	17	Avtandil Kopaliani
LK	18	Levan Datunashvili		(substituted in) 41'
FL	19	Zviad Maisuradze		(substituted in) 49'
SH	20	Bidzina Samkharadze		(substituted in) 31'
WG	21	Otar Eloshvili		(substituted in) 54'
WG	22	Giorgi Elizbarashvili		(substituted in) 54'
Coach:
Malkhaz Cheishvili

Man of the Match:
Lionel Beauxis (France)

Touch judges:
Nigel Owens (Wales)
Dave Pearson (England)
Television match official:
Hugh Watkins (Wales)
Fourth official:
Steve Walsh (New Zealand)
Fifth official:
Franck Maciello (France)

=== Ireland vs Argentina ===
30 September 2007
17:00

Ireland	15–30	Argentina
Try: O'Driscoll 32' c Murphy 47' m Con: O'Gara (1/2); Pen: O'Gara (1/1) 20'	Report	Try: Borges 17' m Agulla 39' c Con: F. Contepomi (1/2); Pen: F. Contepomi (3/4) 43', 62', 66'; Drop: Hernández (3/5) 21', 36', 79'

Parc des Princes, Paris
Attendance: 45,450
Referee: Paul Honiss (New Zealand)

FB	15	Geordan Murphy
RW	14	Shane Horgan
OC	13	Brian O'Driscoll (c)
IC	12	Gordon D'Arcy
LW	11	Denis Hickie	(substituted off) 71'
FH	10	Ronan O'Gara
SH	9	Eoin Reddan	(substituted off) 66'
N8	8	Denis Leamy
OF	7	David Wallace	25' to 28'		(substituted off) 65'
BF	6	Simon Easterby
RL	5	Paul O'Connell
LL	4	Donncha O'Callaghan	(substituted off) 65'
TP	3	John Hayes
HK	2	Jerry Flannery	(substituted off) 65'
LP	1	Marcus Horan
Replacements:
HK	16	Rory Best	(substituted in) 65'
PR	17	Bryan Young
LK	18	Malcolm O'Kelly	(substituted in) 65'
FL	19	Neil Best	(substituted in) 25'	(substituted off) 28'	(substituted in) 65'
SH	20	Isaac Boss	(substituted in) 66'
FH	21	Paddy Wallace
CE	22	Gavin Duffy	(substituted in) 71'
Coach:
Eddie O'Sullivan

FB	15	Ignacio Corleto
RW	14	Lucas Borges
OC	13	Manuel Contepomi	(substituted off) 71'
IC	12	Felipe Contepomi
LW	11	Horacio Agulla
FH	10	Juan Martín Hernández
SH	9	Agustín Pichot (c)
N8	8	Gonzalo Longo
OF	7	Juan Martín Fernández Lobbe
BF	6	Lucas Ostiglia	(substituted off) 62'
RL	5	Patricio Albacete
LL	4	Ignacio Fernández Lobbe	(substituted off) 55'
TP	3	Martín Scelzo	(substituted off) 77'
HK	2	Mario Ledesma	(substituted off) 79'
LP	1	Rodrigo Roncero
Replacements:
HK	16	Alberto Vernet Basualdo	(substituted in) 79'
PR	17	Omar Hasan	(substituted in) 77'
LK	18	Rimas Álvarez Kairelis	(substituted in) 55'
FL	19	Martín Durand	(substituted in) 62'
SH	20	Nicolás Fernández Miranda
FH	21	Federico Todeschini
CE	22	Hernán Senillosa	(substituted in) 71'
Coach:
Marcelo Loffreda

Man of the Match:
Gonzalo Longo (Argentina)

Touch judges:
Mark Lawrence (South Africa)
Craig Joubert (South Africa)
Television match official:
Stuart Dickinson (Australia)
Fourth official:
Christophe Berdos (France)
Fifth official:
Eric Gauzins (France)

Notes

- This was the second time that Argentina had eliminated Ireland from a Rugby World Cup, having also done so in the 1999 Rugby World Cup quarter-final play-off.
- This was Paul Honiss' 44th test as referee, equalling the record of Welsh referee Derek Bevan.
