= List of Namibia national rugby union players =

List of Namibia national rugby union players is a list of people who have played for the Namibia national rugby union team. The list only includes players who have played in test match since 1990, when the Namibia Rugby Union was admitted into the International Rugby Board.

== List ==
No.	Name	Position	Debut date	Debut opponent
1	Barries Barnard	Flanker	24 Mar 1990	v Zimbabwe, Windhoek
2	Eben Beukes	Hooker	24 Mar 1990	v Zimbabwe, Windhoek
3	Cassie Derks	Prop	24 Mar 1990	v Zimbabwe, Windhoek
4	Heinrich de Waal	Winger	24 Mar 1990	v Zimbabwe, Windhoek
5	Johan Deysel	Centre	24 Mar 1990	v Zimbabwe, Windhoek
6	Manie Grobler	Prop	24 Mar 1990	v Zimbabwe, Windhoek
7	Theo Grunewald	Flyhalf	24 Mar 1990	v Zimbabwe, Windhoek
8	Hendrik Loots	Scrumhalf	24 Mar 1990	v Zimbabwe, Windhoek
9	Sarel Losper	Lock	24 Mar 1990	v Zimbabwe, Windhoek
10	Wim Lotter	Centre	24 Mar 1990	v Zimbabwe, Windhoek
11	Gerhard Mans	Winger	24 Mar 1990	v Zimbabwe, Windhoek
12	Willem Maritz	Flanker	24 Mar 1990	v Zimbabwe, Windhoek
13	Theo Oosthuizen	No. 8	24 Mar 1990	v Zimbabwe, Windhoek
14	Alex Skinner	Lock	24 Mar 1990	v Zimbabwe, Windhoek
15	Andre Stoop	Fullback	24 Mar 1990	v Zimbabwe, Windhoek
16	Vince du Toit	Centre	21 Apr 1990	v Portugal, Windhoek
17	Moolman Olivier	Flyhalf	21 Apr 1990	v Portugal, Windhoek
18	Stephan Smith	Hooker	21 Apr 1990	v Portugal, Windhoek
19	Arra van der Merwe	Lock	21 Apr 1990	v Portugal, Windhoek
20	Japie Vermaak	Scrumhalf	21 Apr 1990	v Portugal, Windhoek
21	Jaco Coetzee	(Fullback)	21 Apr 1990	v Portugal, Windhoek
22	Basie Buitendag	Scrumhalf	2 Jun 1990	v Wales, Windhoek
23	Shaun McCulley	Flyhalf	2 Jun 1990	v Wales, Windhoek
24	Ben Swartz	Winger	2 Jun 1990	v Wales, Windhoek
25	Jasper Coetzee	(No. 8)	9 Jun 1990	v Wales, Windhoek
26	Henning Snyman	Centre	23 Jun 1990	v France XV, Windhoek
27	Doug Jeffery	(Winger)	23 Jun 1990	v France XV, Windhoek
28	Hawie Engels	Winger	30 Jun 1990	v France XV, Windhoek
29	Johan Swart	Centre	30 Jun 1990	v France XV, Windhoek
30	Grove Smith	(Replacement)	30 Jun 1990	v France XV, Windhoek
31	Jasper Engelbrecht	Flanker	21 Jul 1990	v West Germany, Windhoek
32	Danie van der Merwe	Centre	21 Jul 1990	v West Germany, Windhoek
33	Willem Alberts	Hooker	18 May 1991	v Spain, Madrid
34	Khaki Goosen	Flanker	18 May 1991	v Spain, Madrid
35	Eden Meyer	Winger	18 May 1991	v Spain, Madrid
36	Andre van Rooyen	No. 8	18 May 1991	v Spain, Madrid
37	Pieter von Wielligh	(Flanker)	22 Jun 1991	v Italy, Windhoek
38	Arno Kotze	Lock	29 Jun 1991	v Zimbabwe, Windhoek
39	Gielie Vermeulen	Fullback	29 Jun 1991	v Zimbabwe, Windhoek
40	Bernard Malgas	Lock	3 Aug 1991	v Zimbabwe, Harare
41	Wimpie Wentzel	Winger	10 Aug 1991	v Zimbabwe, Harare
42	Jannie Augustyn	(Prop)	7 Sep 1991	v Zimbabwe, Windhoek
43	Henry Brink	Flanker	9 May 1992	v Zimbabwe, Windhoek
44	Piet du Plooy	Lock	9 May 1992	v Zimbabwe, Windhoek
45	Michael Marais	Centre	9 May 1992	v Zimbabwe, Windhoek
46	Tiaan Steenkamp	Fullback	9 May 1992	v Zimbabwe, Windhoek
47	Migiel Booysen	Flyhalf	5 Jun 1993	v Wales, Windhoek
48	Dirk Kotze	Lock	5 Jun 1993	v Wales, Windhoek
49	Abe van Wyk	Prop	5 Jun 1993	v Wales, Windhoek
50	Glen Rich	(Replacement)	5 Jun 1993	v Wales, Windhoek
51	Wimpie Otto	Prop	3 Jul 1993	v Arabian Gulf, Nairobi
52	Louis van Coller	Flanker	3 Jul 1993	v Arabian Gulf, Nairobi
53	Charl van Schalkwyk	Winger	3 Jul 1993	v Arabian Gulf, Nairobi
54	Natie van Vuuren	No. 8	3 Jul 1993	v Arabian Gulf, Nairobi
55	Hakkies Husselman	(Scrum half)	3 Jul 1993	v Arabian Gulf, Nairobi
56	Nick du Plessis	Centre	7 Jul 1993	v Kenya, Nairobi
57	Eben Isaacs	Winger	7 Jul 1993	v Kenya, Nairobi
58	Ogies Louw	Flanker	7 Jul 1993	v Kenya, Nairobi
59	Piet Smith	Prop	7 Jul 1993	v Kenya, Nairobi
60	Herman Neethling	(No. 8)	7 Jul 1993	v Kenya, Nairobi
61	Ben Cronje		19 Mar 1994	v Russia, Windhoek
62	Jeane Beukes	Prop	14 Jun 1994	v Zimbabwe, Casablanca
63	Awie Steenkamp	Winger	16 Jun 1994	v Ivory Coast, Casablanca
64	Leon Stoop	Scrumhalf	16 Jun 1994	v Ivory Coast, Casablanca
65	Riaan Jantjies	Scrumhalf	24 Aug 1994	v Hong Kong, Windhoek
66	Quinn Hough	Flanker	18 Mar 1995	v Zimbabwe, Windhoek
67	Jaco Kotze	Winger	18 Mar 1995	v Zimbabwe, Windhoek
68	Chris Roets	Lock	18 Mar 1995	v Zimbabwe, Windhoek
69	Apie van Tonder	Hooker	18 Mar 1995	v Zimbabwe, Windhoek
70	Bertus Calitz	Prop	21 Sep 1995	v Zimbabwe, Harare
71	Sybrand de Beer	No. 8	21 Sep 1995	v Zimbabwe, Harare
72	Attie Samuelson	Fullback	21 Sep 1995	v Zimbabwe, Harare
73	Francois van Rensburg	Centre	21 Sep 1995	v Zimbabwe, Harare
74	Braam Vermeulen	Lock	21 Sep 1995	v Zimbabwe, Harare
75	Claus Schumacher	(Flanker)	21 Sep 1995	v Zimbabwe, Harare
76	Hardus Swart	(Lock)	21 Sep 1995	v Zimbabwe, Harare
77	Andries Blaauw	Prop	1 Mar 1996	v Zimbabwe, Windhoek
78	Nols Engelbrecht	Prop	1 Mar 1996	v Zimbabwe, Windhoek
79	Pres Kotze	Flanker	1 Mar 1996	v Zimbabwe, Windhoek
80	Johan Lombaard	Flanker	1 Mar 1996	v Zimbabwe, Windhoek
81	Pieter Steyn	Lock	1 Mar 1996	v Zimbabwe, Windhoek
82	Thys van Rooyen	No. 8	1 Mar 1996	v Zimbabwe, Windhoek
83	Franklin Hartung	(Winger)	1 Mar 1996	v Zimbabwe, Windhoek
84	Danie Vermeulen	(Prop)	1 Mar 1996	v Zimbabwe, Windhoek
85	Johan Britz	(Replacement)	4 May 1996	v Zimbabwe, Harare
86	Herman Reinders	(Lock)	4 May 1996	v Zimbabwe, Harare
87	Emile Erasmus	Flyhalf	24 May 1997	v Tonga, Windhoek
88	Derek Farmer	Winger	24 May 1997	v Tonga, Windhoek
89	Andre Greeff	Winger	24 May 1997	v Tonga, Windhoek
90	Lukas Holtzhausen	Centre	24 May 1997	v Tonga, Windhoek
91	Kobus Horn	No. 8	24 May 1997	v Tonga, Windhoek
92	Schalk van der Merwe	Flanker	24 May 1997	v Tonga, Windhoek
93	Riaan van Zyl	Hooker	24 May 1997	v Tonga, Windhoek
94	Johan Zaayman	Scrumhalf	24 May 1997	v Tonga, Windhoek
95	Hugo Horn	(Hooker)	24 May 1997	v Tonga, Windhoek
96	Rudie van Vuuren	(Replacement)	24 May 1997	v Tonga, Windhoek
97	Deon Gouws	Centre	14 Jun 1997	v Zimbabwe, Bulawayo
98	Hardus Breedt	(Prop)	14 Jun 1997	v Zimbabwe, Bulawayo
99	Jan Dames	(Flanker)	14 Jun 1997	v Zimbabwe, Bulawayo
100	Johan Nienaber	Winger	23 Jan 1998	v Portugal, Lisbon
101	Riaan Theart	(Replacement)	23 Jan 1998	v Portugal, Lisbon
102	Lean van Dyk	Fullback	18 Apr 1998	v Tunisia, Tunis
103	Eben Smith	(Prop)	18 Apr 1998	v Tunisia, Tunis
104	Sarel Janse van Rensburg	(Centre)	9 May 1998	v Zimbabwe, Windhoek
105	Heino Senekal	Lock	12 Sep 1998	v Ivory Coast, Casablanca
106	Duimpie Theron	Lock	12 Sep 1998	v Ivory Coast, Casablanca
107	Herman Lintvelt	(Flanker)	12 Sep 1998	v Ivory Coast, Casablanca
108	Ronaldo Pedro	(Scrum half)	19 Sep 1998	v Zimbabwe, Casablanca
109	Driek Vermaak	(Flyhalf)	19 Sep 1998	v Zimbabwe, Casablanca
110	Sean Furter	Flanker	7 Aug 1999	v Zimbabwe, Pretoria
111	Mario Jacobs	Prop	7 Aug 1999	v Zimbabwe, Pretoria
112	Jaco Olivier	No. 8	7 Aug 1999	v Zimbabwe, Pretoria
113	Jood Opperman	Prop	7 Aug 1999	v Zimbabwe, Pretoria
114	Glovin van Wyk	Fullback	7 Aug 1999	v Zimbabwe, Pretoria
115	Frans Fisch	(Prop)	7 Aug 1999	v Zimbabwe, Pretoria
116	Deon Mouton	(Winger)	7 Aug 1999	v Zimbabwe, Pretoria
117	Cliff Loubser	(Centre)	8 Oct 1999	v France, Bordeaux
118	Henk Botha	No. 8	1 Jul 2000	v Zimbabwe, Harare
119	Wolfie Duvenhage	Flanker	1 Jul 2000	v Zimbabwe, Harare
120	Jassie Genis	Lock	1 Jul 2000	v Zimbabwe, Harare
121	Philip Isaacs	Hooker	1 Jul 2000	v Zimbabwe, Harare
122	Fanna Lambert	Prop	1 Jul 2000	v Zimbabwe, Harare
123	Skille Nell	Flyhalf	1 Jul 2000	v Zimbabwe, Harare
124	Maurice Kapitako	(Prop)	1 Jul 2000	v Zimbabwe, Harare
125	Andy Boy Engelbrecht	Winger	22 Jul 2000	v Zimbabwe, Windhoek
126	Robert Jeary	Lock	22 Jul 2000	v Zimbabwe, Windhoek
127	Dirkie Beukes	(Replacement)	22 Jul 2000	v Zimbabwe, Windhoek
128	Dirk de Beer	(Replacement)	22 Jul 2000	v Zimbabwe, Windhoek
129	Hendrik Mouton	(Replacement)	22 Jul 2000	v Zimbabwe, Windhoek
130	Nico de Wet	Winger	22 Sep 2000	v Uruguay, Montevideo
131	Archie Graham	Lock	23 Jun 2001	v Italy, Windhoek
132	Johan Kruger	Winger	23 Jun 2001	v Italy, Windhoek
133	Lorenzo Plaath	Flyhalf	23 Jun 2001	v Italy, Windhoek
134	Corne Powell	Centre	23 Jun 2001	v Italy, Windhoek
135	Rudiger Gentz	(Lock)	23 Jun 2001	v Italy, Windhoek
136	Pat Kotze	(Flanker)	23 Jun 2001	v Italy, Windhoek
137	Corne Redelinghuys	(Flanker)	23 Jun 2001	v Italy, Windhoek
138	Morné du Plessis	Fullback	7 Jul 2001	v Zimbabwe, Bulawayo
139	Du Preez Grobler	(Centre)	7 Jul 2001	v Zimbabwe, Bulawayo
140	Dries Tredoux	(Lock)	7 Jul 2001	v Zimbabwe, Bulawayo
141	Kees Lensing	Prop	15 Jun 2002	v Madagascar, Windhoek
142	Tiaan Opperman	Prop	15 Jun 2002	v Madagascar, Windhoek
143	Morné Schreuder	Flyhalf	15 Jun 2002	v Madagascar, Windhoek
144	Rian van Wyk	Winger	15 Jun 2002	v Madagascar, Windhoek
145	Johan Jenkins	(Prop)	15 Jun 2002	v Madagascar, Windhoek
146	Willem Smith	(Scrum half)	15 Jun 2002	v Madagascar, Windhoek
147	Jurgens van Lill	(No. 8)	15 Jun 2002	v Madagascar, Windhoek
148	Vincent Dreyer	Fullback	29 Jun 2002	v Zimbabwe, Bulawayo
149	Niel du Toit	Prop	28 Sep 2002	v Tunisia, Windhoek
150	Cor van Tonder	Hooker	28 Sep 2002	v Tunisia, Windhoek
151	Emile Wessels	(Flyhalf)	28 Sep 2002	v Tunisia, Windhoek
152	Robert Dedig	(Prop)	12 Oct 2002	v Tunisia, Tunis
153	Melrick Africa	Winger	12 Jul 2003	v Samoa, Windhoek
154	Jurie Booysen	Fullback	12 Jul 2003	v Samoa, Windhoek
155	Johannes Meyer	(Hooker)	16 Aug 2003	v Kenya, Nairobi
156	Tommie Gouws	Lock	31 Aug 2003	v Uganda, Windhoek
157	Regardt Kruger	Scrumhalf	31 Aug 2003	v Uganda, Windhoek
158	Martyn Jeary	(Prop)	31 Aug 2003	v Uganda, Windhoek
159	Desmond Snyders	(Flyhalf)	31 Aug 2003	v Uganda, Windhoek
160	Shaun van Rooi	(Flanker)	31 Aug 2003	v Uganda, Windhoek
161	Tinus Venter	(Centre)	31 Aug 2003	v Uganda, Windhoek
162	Niel Swanepoel	(Flyhalf)	14 Oct 2003	v Argentina, Gosford
163	Deon Grunschloss	(Fullback)	25 Oct 2003	v Australia, Adelaide
164	Domingo Kamonga	Lock	29 Feb 2004	v Morocco, Casablanca
165	Jurie van Tonder	Scrumhalf	29 Feb 2004	v Morocco, Casablanca
166	Leon van Wyk	Flanker	29 Feb 2004	v Morocco, Casablanca
167	Rene Kruger	(Hooker)	29 Feb 2004	v Morocco, Casablanca
168	Jacques Burger	No. 8	14 Aug 2004	v Zambia, Nchingola
169	Ivan Gaya	Prop	14 Aug 2004	v Zambia, Nchingola
170	Hendrik Meyer	Fullback	14 Aug 2004	v Zambia, Nchingola
171	Pieter Rossouw	Scrumhalf	14 Aug 2004	v Zambia, Nchingola
172	Rheeder van Wyk	Lock	14 Aug 2004	v Zambia, Nchingola
173	JJ Husselman	(Replacement)	14 Aug 2004	v Zambia, Nchingola
174	Roger Thompson	(Centre)	14 Aug 2004	v Zambia, Nchingola
175	Ryan Witbooi	(Winger)	14 Aug 2004	v Zambia, Nchingola
176	Michael MacKenzie	(Flanker)	25 Sep 2004	v Zimbabwe, Windhoek
177	Heiki Amakali	Prop	1 Oct 2005	v Madagascar, Windhoek
178	Jacky Bock	Flyhalf	1 Oct 2005	v Madagascar, Windhoek
179	Heini Bock	Winger	1 Oct 2005	v Madagascar, Windhoek
180	Faan Horn	Flanker	1 Oct 2005	v Madagascar, Windhoek
181	Mbaroro Katjiuanjo	Lock	1 Oct 2005	v Madagascar, Windhoek
182	Duan Spangenberg	No. 8	1 Oct 2005	v Madagascar, Windhoek
183	Johann Wohler	Flanker	1 Oct 2005	v Madagascar, Windhoek
184	Enrico Gaoab	(Lock)	1 Oct 2005	v Madagascar, Windhoek
185	Craig Lesch	(Prop)	1 Oct 2005	v Madagascar, Windhoek
186	Philip Meyer	(Replacement)	1 Oct 2005	v Madagascar, Windhoek
187	Pieter Mouton	(Replacement)	1 Oct 2005	v Madagascar, Windhoek
188	Gerhard Suze	(Replacement)	1 Oct 2005	v Madagascar, Windhoek
189	Deon van der Bergh	Prop	6 Nov 2005	v Morocco, Casablanca
190	Ismael du Plessis	(Replacement)	6 Nov 2005	v Morocco, Casablanca
191	Joseph Losper	(Replacement)	6 Nov 2005	v Morocco, Casablanca
192	Uakazuwaka Kazombiaze	Lock	27 May 2006	v Kenya, Windhoek
193	Eugene Jantjies	(Scrum half)	27 May 2006	v Kenya, Windhoek
194	Leinard van der Linde	(Prop)	1 Jul 2006	v Tunisia, Tunis
195	P. J. van Lill	(Back row)	1 Jul 2006	v Tunisia, Tunis
196	Lu-Wayne Botes	Centre	9 Sep 2006	v Kenya, Nairobi
197	Tinus du Plessis	Flanker	9 Sep 2006	v Kenya, Nairobi
198	Nico Esterhuyse	Lock	9 Sep 2006	v Kenya, Nairobi
199	Riaan Grundling	Prop	9 Sep 2006	v Kenya, Nairobi
200	Elrich Jansen	Scrumhalf	9 Sep 2006	v Kenya, Nairobi
201	Johnny Redelinghuys	Prop	9 Sep 2006	v Kenya, Nairobi
202	John Drotsky	(Centre)	9 Sep 2006	v Kenya, Nairobi
203	Morne Louw	(Hooker)	9 Sep 2006	v Kenya, Nairobi
204	Dawie Koen	(Scrum half)	7 Oct 2006	v Tunisia, Windhoek
205	Guillaume Nel	Winger	28 Oct 2006	v Morocco, Windhoek
206	Jané du Toit	Prop	26 May 2007	v Zambia, Windhoek
207	Tertius Losper	Fullback	26 May 2007	v Zambia, Windhoek
208	Jacques Nieuwenhuis	Flanker	26 May 2007	v Zambia, Windhoek
209	Justinus van der Westhuizen	Flyhalf	26 May 2007	v Zambia, Windhoek
210	Marius Visser	(Prop)	26 May 2007	v Zambia, Windhoek
211	Skipper Badenhorst	(Hooker)	5 Jun 2007	v Georgia, Bucharest
212	Stefan Durand	(Winger)	5 Jun 2007	v Georgia, Bucharest
213	Christo Steenkamp	Centre	23 Jun 2007	v Uganda, Kampala
214	Bradley Langenhoven	Winger	15 Aug 2007	v South Africa, Cape Town
215	Piet van Zyl	Centre	15 Aug 2007	v South Africa, Cape Town
216	Okkert du Plessis	Lock	14 Jun 2008	v Senegal, Dakar
217	David Philander	Centre	14 Jun 2008	v Senegal, Dakar
218	Jaco van Zyl	Flyhalf	14 Jun 2008	v Senegal, Dakar
219	Gawan Esterhuizen	(Replacement)	14 Jun 2008	v Senegal, Dakar
220	Deon Pieters	(Replacement)	14 Jun 2008	v Senegal, Dakar
221	Chrysander Botha	Fullback	2 Aug 2008	v Zimbabwe, Windhoek
222	Luwayne Kotzee	Winger	2 Aug 2008	v Zimbabwe, Windhoek
223	Llewellyn Winckler	Winger	2 Aug 2008	v Zimbabwe, Windhoek
224	Carlo Campbell	(Prop)	2 Aug 2008	v Zimbabwe, Windhoek
225	Shaun Esterhuizen	(Hooker)	2 Aug 2008	v Zimbabwe, Windhoek
226	Godwin Walters	(Flyhalf)	2 Aug 2008	v Zimbabwe, Windhoek
227	McGrath van Wyk	Winger	14 Jun 2009	v Ivory Coast, Abidjan
228	Andre de Klerk	(Lock)	14 Jun 2009	v Ivory Coast, Abidjan
229	Robert Herridge	(Fullback)	7 Nov 2009	v Portugal, Lisbon
230	Heinz Koll	(Lock)	7 Nov 2009	v Portugal, Lisbon
231	Brendon Walters	(Back row)	7 Nov 2009	v Portugal, Lisbon
232	Thomasau Forbes	Flanker	23 Jan 2010	v Russia, Windhoek
233	André Vermeulen	Flanker	23 Jan 2010	v Russia, Windhoek
234	Eneill Buitendag	(Scrum half)	23 Jan 2010	v Russia, Windhoek
235	Darryl de la Harpe	(Centre)	23 Jan 2010	v Russia, Windhoek
236	Renaud van Neel	(Lock)	23 Jan 2010	v Russia, Windhoek
237	Bertus O'Callaghan	(Hooker)	11 Jun 2010	v Romania, Bucharest
238	Colin de Koe	(Scrum half)	20 Jun 2010	v Georgia, Bucharest
239	Conrad Marais	Winger	20 Nov 2010	v Portugal, Coimbra
240	Attie du Plessis	(Centre)	20 Nov 2010	v Portugal, Coimbra
241	Rohan Kitshoff	(Flanker)	20 Nov 2010	v Portugal, Coimbra
242	Sergio de la Harpe	Winger	27 Nov 2010	v Spain, Palma de Mallorca
243	Morné Blom	(Lock)	27 Nov 2010	v Spain, Palma de Mallorca
244	Casper Viviers	(Prop)	27 Nov 2010	v Spain, Palma de Mallorca
245	Ryan de la Harpe	Scrumhalf	10 Jun 2011	v Romania, Bucharest
246	Danie van Wyk	Centre	10 Jun 2011	v Romania, Bucharest
247	Theuns Kotzé	Flyhalf	15 Jun 2011	v Portugal, Bucharest
248	Danie Dames	Winger	10 Sep 2011	v Fiji, Rotorua
249	Raoul Larson	Prop	10 Sep 2011	v Fiji, Rotorua
250	Henk Franken	Lock	14 Sep 2011	v Samoa, Rotorua
251	Arthur Bouwer	Centre	4 Jul 2012	v Senegal, Antananarive
252	Anthony Jevu	Centre	4 Jul 2012	v Senegal, Antananarive
253	Justin Nel	Fullback	4 Jul 2012	v Senegal, Antananarive
254	Collen Smith	Prop	4 Jul 2012	v Senegal, Antananarive
255	Carel Swanepoel	Hooker	4 Jul 2012	v Senegal, Antananarive
256	Petrus Human	(Lock)	4 Jul 2012	v Senegal, Antananarive
257	Lean Stoop	(Centre)	4 Jul 2012	v Senegal, Antananarive
258	Shaun du Preez	(Replacement)	8 Jul 2012	v Madagascar, Antananarive
259	Harold Kasera	(Flanker)	8 Jul 2012	v Madagascar, Antananarive
260	Herman Stroh	(Winger)	8 Jul 2012	v Madagascar, Antananarive
261	Rathony Becker	Hooker	10 Nov 2012	v Zimbabwe, Windhoek
262	Munio Kasiringua	Lock	10 Nov 2012	v Zimbabwe, Windhoek
263	Stefan Neustadt	Lock	10 Nov 2012	v Zimbabwe, Windhoek
264	André Schlechter	Prop	10 Nov 2012	v Zimbabwe, Windhoek
265	Munee Tjiueza Uatjiueza	Flanker	10 Nov 2012	v Zimbabwe, Windhoek
266	Johann Tromp	Winger	10 Nov 2012	v Zimbabwe, Windhoek
267	Stef Botha	(Lock)	10 Nov 2012	v Zimbabwe, Windhoek
268	Hannes Dursewei	(Hooker)	10 Nov 2012	v Zimbabwe, Windhoek
269	Roderique Victor	(Flanker)	10 Nov 2012	v Zimbabwe, Windhoek
270	Shaun Kaizemi	(Fullback)	17 Nov 2012	v Spain, Windhoek
271	Jaco Engels	Prop	11 Jun 2013	v Senegal, Dakar
272	Heinrich Smit	(Winger)	11 Jun 2013	v Senegal, Dakar
273	Jaco Swanepoel	(Lock)	11 Jun 2013	v Senegal, Dakar
274	Awie Thompson	(Flanker)	11 Jun 2013	v Senegal, Dakar
275	Malcolm Moore	Winger	15 Jun 2013	v Tunisia, Dakar
276	Louis van der Westhuizen	(Hooker)	8 Nov 2013	v Zimbabwe, Windhoek
277	Janco Venter	(No. 8)	8 Nov 2013	v Zimbabwe, Windhoek
278	Johan Deysel	Centre	16 Nov 2013	v Kenya, Windhoek
279	Chris Arries	(Flyhalf)	16 Nov 2013	v Kenya, Windhoek
280	Renaldo Bothma	Flanker	28 Jun 2014	v Kenya, Antananarive
281	DG Wiese	(Hooker)	2 Jul 2014	v Zimbabwe, Antananarive
282	Torsten van Jaarsveld	Hooker	29 Oct 2014	v Germany, Windhoek
283	J. C. Greyling	(Centre)	29 Oct 2014	v Germany, Windhoek
284	Tjiuee Uanivi	(Lock)	29 Oct 2014	v Germany, Windhoek
285	Franklin Bertolini	(Prop)	7 Nov 2014	v Canada, Colwyn Bay
286	Quintin Esterhuizen	(Prop)	22 Nov 2014	v Portugal, Lisbon
287	Aranos Coetzee	Prop	6 Jun 2015	v Tunisia, Nabeul
288	Leneve Damens	Flanker	6 Jun 2015	v Tunisia, Nabeul
289	A. J. de Klerk	(Prop)	17 Jun 2015	v Romania, Bucharest
290	Russell van Wyk	Winger	21 Jun 2015	v Spain, Bucharest
291	Zana Botes	No. 8	18 Jul 2015	v Russia, Windhoek
292	Wian Conradie	Flanker	8 Aug 2015	v Kenya, Windhoek
293	Damian Stevens	Scrumhalf	8 Aug 2015	v Kenya, Windhoek
294	Gert Lotter	Hooker	9 Jun 2016	v Romania, Bucharest
295	Gino Wilson	Winger	9 Jun 2016	v Romania, Bucharest
296	Ruan Ludick	(Lock)	9 Jun 2016	v Romania, Bucharest
297	Christo van der Merwe	(Flanker)	16 Jul 2016	v Kenya, Windhoek
298	Cameron Klassen	(Scrum half)	6 Aug 2016	v Zimbabwe, Windhoek
299	Lesley Klim	Winger	10 Jun 2017	v Spain, Montevideo
300	Mahepisa Tjeriko	Lock	10 Jun 2017	v Spain, Montevideo
301	Johan Retief	(Lock)	10 Jun 2017	v Spain, Montevideo
302	Justin Newman	Centre	18 Jun 2017	v Russia, Montevideo
303	Cliven Loubser	(Flyhalf)	18 Jun 2017	v Russia, Montevideo
304	Max Katjijeko	(Lock)	1 Jul 2017	v Tunisia, Monastir
305	TC Kisting	(Flyhalf)	1 Jul 2017	v Tunisia, Monastir
306	Des Sethie	(Prop)	1 Jul 2017	v Tunisia, Monastir
307	Adriaan Booysen	No. 8	8 Jul 2017	v Senegal, Windhoek
308	Obert Nortjé	(Hooker)	8 Jul 2017	v Senegal, Windhoek
309	Niël van Vuuren	(Hooker)	22 Jul 2017	v Uganda, Kampala
310	Nelius Theron	(Prop)	18 Nov 2017	v Uruguay, Windhoek
311	André Rademeyer	(Prop)	16 Jun 2018	v Uganda, Windhoek
312	P. W. Steenkamp	(Fullback)	16 Jun 2018	v Uganda, Windhoek
313	Janry du Toit	Winger	10 Nov 2018	v Russia, Krasnodar
314	Adriaan Ludick	Lock	10 Nov 2018	v Russia, Krasnodar
315	Prince ǃGaoseb	(Flanker)	10 Nov 2018	v Russia, Krasnodar
316	Henrique Olivier	Flyhalf	17 Nov 2018	v Spain, Madrid
317	Jason Benade	(Prop)	17 Nov 2018	v Spain, Madrid
318	Chad Plato	(Centre)	17 Nov 2018	v Spain, Madrid
319	Wihan von Wielligh	(Scrum half)	17 Nov 2018	v Spain, Madrid
320	Oderich Mouton	Winger	9 Jun 2019	v Uruguay, Montevideo
321	Dumarcho Hartung	Winger	15 Jun 2019	v Russia, Montevideo
322	PJ Walters	(Fullback)	22 Sep 2019	v Italy, Osaka
323	Riaan van Zyl	Scrumhalf	3 Jul 2021	v Ivory Coast, Grand-Bassam
324	Ethan Beukes	(Centre)	3 Jul 2021	v Ivory Coast, Grand-Bassam
325	Cameron Langenhoven	(Flanker)	3 Jul 2021	v Ivory Coast, Grand-Bassam
326	Ricardo Swartz	(Winger)	3 Jul 2021	v Ivory Coast, Grand-Bassam
327	Hanreco van Zyl	(Scrum half)	3 Jul 2021	v Ivory Coast, Grand-Bassam
328	Simon Kanime	(Prop)	7 Jul 2021	v Madagascar, Grand-Bassam
329	Johan Luttig	(Lock)	7 Jul 2021	v Madagascar, Grand-Bassam
330	Gerhard Thirion	(Hooker)	7 Jul 2021	v Madagascar, Grand-Bassam
331	Danco Burger		14 Nov 2021	v Kenya, Stellenbosch
332	Jayden Bussel		14 Nov 2021	v Kenya, Stellenbosch
333	Lorenzo Louis		14 Nov 2021	v Kenya, Stellenbosch
334	Gerhard Opperman		14 Nov 2021	v Kenya, Stellenbosch
335	Herschell van Wyk		14 Nov 2021	v Kenya, Stellenbosch
336	Chemigan Beukes		20 Nov 2021	v Zimbabwe, Stellenbosch
337	Warren Ludwig		12 Nov 2022	v Spain, Madrid
338	Le Roux Malan		12 Nov 2022	v Spain, Madrid
339	Wicus Jacobs		12 Nov 2022	v Spain, Madrid
340	André van den Berg		12 Nov 2022	v Spain, Madrid
341	Divan Rossouw		12 Nov 2022	v Spain, Madrid
342	Richard Hardwick		19 Nov 2022	v Canada, Amsterdam
343	Darryl Wellman		19 Nov 2022	v Canada, Amsterdam
344	Gerswin Mouton		5 Aug 2023	v Uruguay, Montevideo
345	Haitembu Shikufa		5 Aug 2023	v Uruguay, Montevideo
346	Tiaan Swanepoel		5 Aug 2023	v Uruguay, Montevideo
347	Gihard Visagie		5 Aug 2023	v Uruguay, Montevideo
348	Jacques Theron		5 Aug 2023	v Uruguay, Montevideo
349	Tiaan de Klerk		12 Aug 2023	v Chile, Valparaíso
350	Oela Blaauw		21 Sep 2023	v France, Marseille
351	Alcino Izaacs		21 Sep 2023	v France, Marseille
