= 2006 Barbarians end of season tour =

Summary
P	W	D	L
Total
3	1	0	2
Test match
3	1	0	2
Opponent
P	W	D	L
England XV
1	0	0	1
Scotland XV
1	0	0	1
Georgia
1	1	0	0

The 2006 Barbarians rugby union tour was a series of matches played in May–June 2006 in by Barbarians F.C. They played against Scotland, England and, for the first time, against Georgia.

== Results ==
28 May 2006

England XV	46–19	Barbarians
Try: Simpson-Daniel (2); Barkley; Forrester; Barnes; Armitage; Con: Barkley (5); Pen: Barkley (2)	report	Try: Magne; Reihana; Burke; Con: Burke (2)

Twickenham Stadium, London
Referee: Donal Courtney (Ireland)

England XV: 15. Mark van Gisbergen, 14. James Simpson-Daniel (Delon Armitage from 77'), 13. Mathew Tait, 12. Mike Catt (Stuart Abbott from 55'), 11. Iain Balshaw, 10. Olly Barkley, 9. Peter Richards(Scott Bemand from 75'), 8. Pat Sanderson (c), 7. Michael Lipman (James Haskell from 75'), 6. James Forrester, 5. Alex Brown, 4. James Hudson (Kieran Roche from 55'), 3. Duncan Bell, 2. Lee Mears (David Paice from 55'), 1. Tim Payne (David Barnes from 55')
Barbarians: 15. Matt Burke (Australia), 14. Bruce Reihana (New Zealand), 13. Thomas Castaignède (France), 12. Isaac Fe'aunati (Samoa) (Fraser Waters – England, from 66'), 11. Joe Roff (Australia) ( Isa Nacewa – Fiji from 41'), 10. Carlos Spencer (New Zealand) 9. Robinson (New Zealand) (Justin Marshall – New Zealand from 50'), 8. Xavier Rush (New Zealand), 7. Olivier Magne (France), 6. Toutai Kefu (Australia), (Sam Harding – New Zealand from 66'), 5. Tom Palmer (England), 4. Bob Casey (Ireland) (Daniel Leo, Samoa from 73'), 3. Christian Califano (France), 2. Raphaël Ibañez (c; France) (James Regan – England from 66'), 1. Andrea Lo Cicero (Italy) (Peter Bracken – England from 66')

31 May 2006

Scotland XV	66–19	Barbarians
	Report

Murrayfield Stadium, Edinburgh

Scotland XV: 15. Hugo Southwell, 14. Chris Paterson, 13. Marcus Di Rollo, 12. Andrew Henderson, 11. Sean Lamont, 10. Dan Parks, 9. Mike Blair, 8. Derek White, 7. Kelly Brown, 6. Ally Hogg 5. Scott Murray, 4. Alastair Kellock, 3. Craig Smith, 2. Scott Lawson, 1. Gavin Kerr – Replacements: Dougie Hall, Bruce Douglas, Scott MacLeod, Donnie Macfadyen, Sam Pinder, Gordon Ross, Simon Webster
Barbarians: Hanley, Lloyd, Greenwood, Parker, L. Robinson, Malone, Spice, Tkachuk, Dixon, Davies, Hamilton, Louw, Dawson, Forster, Browne – Replacements: Azam, Miall, Crompton, Skinstad, Rauluni, Maggs, Monye, Marsh

4 June 2006

Georgia	19–28	Barbarians
Try: Machkhaneli (2); Magrakvelidze; Con: Barkalaia (2)		Try: Hallett; Hanley (2); Monye; Con: Hallett; Malone (3)

Mikheil Meskhi Stadium, Tbilisi
Attendance: 10,000
Referee: Tony Spreadbury (England)

Georgia: 15. Paliko Jimsheladze (c), 14. Otar Eloshvili, 13. Revaz Gigauri, 12. Irakli Giorgadze, 11. Irakli Machkhaneli, 10. Otar Barkalaia, 9. Bidzina Samkharadze, 8. Besso Udessiani, 7. Rati Urushadze, 6. Ilia Maissuradze, 5. Levan Datunashvili, 4. Mamuka Gorgodze, 3. Avto Kopaliani, 2. Akvsenti Giorgadze, 1. Mamuka Magrakvelidze – Replacements: 16. Michael Sujashvili, 17. David Khinchagashvili, 18. Shalva Papashvili, 19. Zviad Maissuradze, 20. George Kacharava, 21. Lexo Gugava, 22. George Elizbarashvili
Barbarians: 15. Neil Hallett, 14. Ugo Monye, 13. Tony Marsh, 12. Kevin Maggs, 11. Lee Robinson, 10. Chris Malone, 9. Jacob Rauluni, 8. Bobby Skinstad (c), 7. Will Skinner, 6. Brad MacLeod-Henderson, 5. Simon Miall, 4. Jim Hamilton, 3. Darren Crompton, 2. Olivier Azam, 1. Justin Fitzpatrick – Replacements: 16. Steve Hanley, 17. Leon Lloyd, 18. Pat Howard, 19. Pieter Dixon, 20. Kevin Tkachuk, 21. Hottie Louw, 22. Daniel Browne, 23. Ian Vass, 24. Jason Forster, 25. John Davies
