= Georgia at the Rugby World Cup =

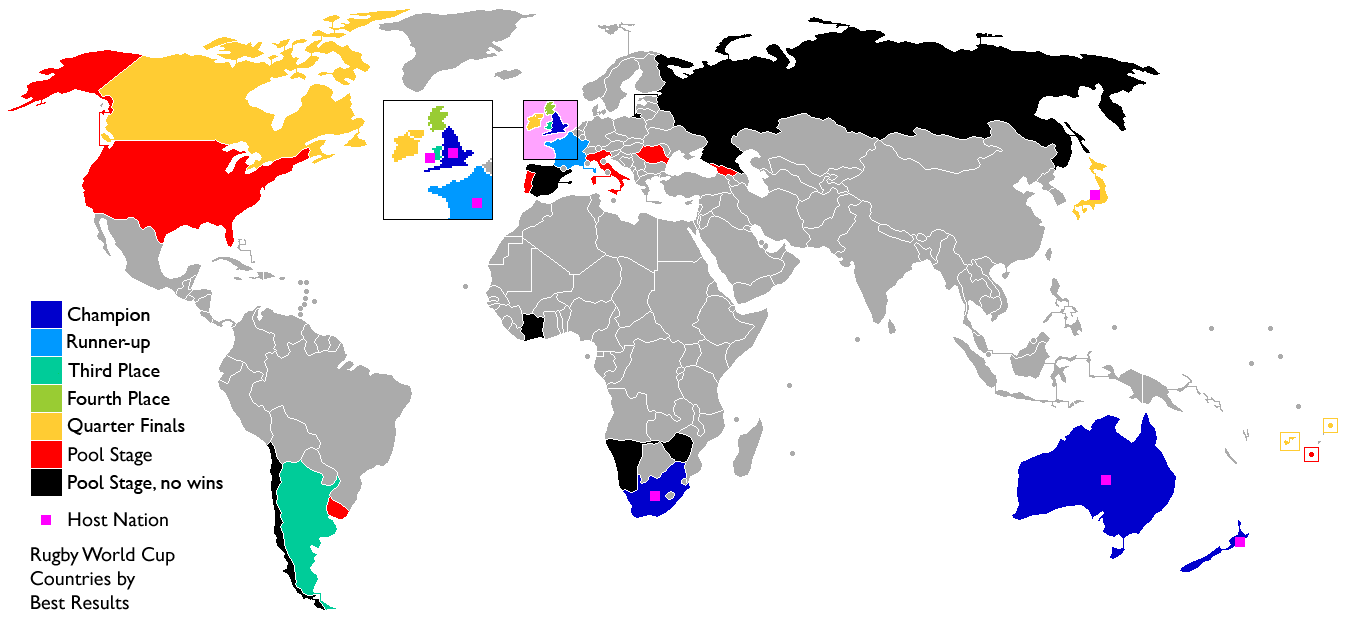
Map of nations best results, excluding nations which unsuccessfully participated in qualifying tournaments

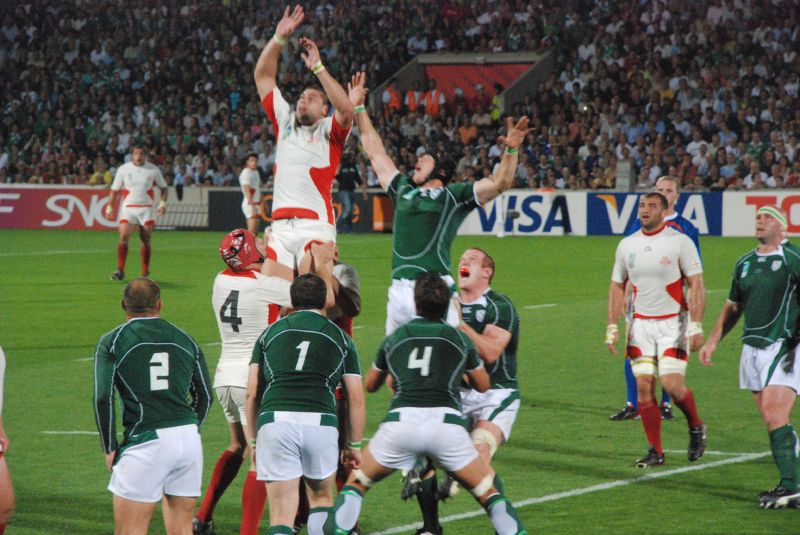
Ireland playing Georgia in the 2007 Rugby World Cup

The Georgia national rugby union team has competed in five consecutive Rugby World Cup tournaments. Starting in 2003, which also served as the only appearance prior to the Rose Revolution, they were placed in Pool C with eventual winners England, South Africa, Uruguay and Samoa, where they lost all four matches. Georgia qualified for the 2007 World Cup and were placed in Pool D with Argentina, France, Ireland and Namibia, where they beat Namibia. In 2011 Rugby World Cup, Georgia qualified for their third straight tournament. They were placed in Pool B with Scotland, England, Argentina and Romania and won the game against rivals Romania. Their best performance was in 2015 tournament, when they were drawn against eventual world champions New Zealand, Argentina, Tonga and Namibia. Georgia won games against Tonga and Namibia, finished third in the group and automatically qualified for 2019 Rugby World Cup.

== World Cup record ==
Rugby World Cup record										Qualification						
Year	Round	Pld	W	D	L	PF	PA	Squad	Head coach	Pos	Pld	W	D	L	PF	PA
(New Zealand) (Australia) 1987	Part of the Soviet Union: Not an independent country									—						
(England) (France) (Ireland) (Scotland) (Wales) 1991	Part of the Soviet Union: Not an independent country									—						
(South Africa) 1995	Did not qualify									3rd	2	0	0	2	15	38
(Wales) 1999	Did not qualify									P/O	8	4	0	4	131	221
(Australia) 2003	Pool Stage	4	0	0	4	46	200	Squad	C. Saurel	2nd	2	1	0	1	31	76
(France) 2007	Pool Stage	4	1	0	3	50	111	Squad	M. Cheishvili	P/O	14	10	1	3	426	182
(New Zealand) 2011	Pool Stage	4	1	0	3	48	90	Squad	R. Dickson	1st	10	8	1	1	326	132
(England) 2015	Pool Stage	4	2	0	2	53	123	Squad	M. Haig	1st	10	9	1	0	286	106
(Japan) 2019	Pool Stage	4	1	0	3	65	122	Squad	M. Haig	Automatically qualified						
(France) 2023	Pool Stage	4	0	1	3	64	113	Squad	L. Maisashvili	1st	10	9	1	0	325	146
(Australia) 2027	Qualified									1st	3	3	0	0	212	39
(United States) 2031	To be determined									To be determined						
Total	—	24	5	1	18	326	759	—	—	—	59	44	4	11	1752	940
Champions; Runners–up; Third place; Fourth place; Home venue

== By matches ==
=== 2003 ===
Group C matches -

Team	Pld	W	D	L	PF	PA	PD	BP	Pts	Qualification
England	4	4	0	0	255	47	+208	3	19	Quarter-finals
South Africa	4	3	0	1	184	60	+124	3	15	Quarter-finals
Samoa	4	2	0	2	138	117	+21	2	10	
Uruguay	4	1	0	3	56	255	−199	0	4	
Georgia	4	0	0	4	46	200	−154	0	0	

12 October 2003

England	84–6	Georgia
Try: Tindall, Dawson, Thompson, Back, Dallaglio, Greenwood (2), Regan, Cohen (2), Robinson, Luger; Con: Wilkinson (5), Grayson (4); Pen: Wilkinson (2)		Pen: Urjukashvili, Jimsheladze

Subiaco Oval, Perth
Attendance: 25,501
Referee: Pablo De Luca (Argentina)

19 October 2003

Georgia	9–46	Samoa
Pen: Jimsheladze (2); Drop: Jimsheladze		Try: Tagicakibau, Vaa'a, Sititi, So'oialo, Fe'aunati, Lima; Con: Va'a (5); Pen: Va'a (2)

Subiaco Oval, Perth
Attendance: 21,507
Referee: Alain Rolland (Ireland)

24 October 2003

South Africa	46–19	Georgia
Try: Rossouw (2), Hougaard, van Niekerk, Fourie, Botha, Burger; Con: Hougaard (4); Pen: Hougaard		Try: Dadunashvili; Con: Jimsheladze; Pen: Jimsheladze (3), Kvirikashvili

Sydney Football Stadium, Sydney
Attendance: 34,308
Referee: Stuart Dickinson (Australia)

28 October 2003

Georgia	12–24	Uruguay
Pen: Urjukashvili, Kvirikashvili (3)		Try: Cardoso, Lamelas, Brignoni; Con: Aguirre (2), Menchaca; Pen: Juan Menchaca

Sydney Football Stadium, Sydney
Attendance: 28,576
Referee: Kelvin Deaker (New Zealand)

=== 2007 ===
Pos	Team	Pld	W	D	L	PF	PA	PD	B	Pts	Qualification
1	Argentina	4	4	0	0	143	33	+110	2	18	Qualified for the quarter-finals
2	France	4	3	0	1	188	37	+151	3	15	Qualified for the quarter-finals
3	Ireland	4	2	0	2	64	82	−18	1	9	Eliminated, automatic qualification for RWC 2011
4	Georgia	4	1	0	3	50	111	−61	1	5	
5	Namibia	4	0	0	4	30	212	−182	0	0	

11 September 2007
20:00

Argentina	33–3	Georgia
Try: Borges 47' c, 56' m Albacete 72' m Martín Aramburú 80' c Con: F. Contepomi (1/3); Hernández (1/1); Pen: F. Contepomi (3/3) 12', 35', 54'	Report	Pen: Kvirikashvili (1/2) 2'

Stade de Gerland, Lyon
Attendance: 40,240
Referee: Nigel Owens (Wales)

15 September 2007
21:00

Ireland	14–10	Georgia
Try: R. Best 17' c Dempsey 55' c Con: O'Gara (2/2)	Report	Try: Shkinin 45' c Con: Kvirikashvili (1/1); Pen: Kvirikashvili (1/2) 37'

Stade Chaban-Delmas, Bordeaux
Attendance: 33,807
Referee: Wayne Barnes (England)

26 September 2007
18:00

Georgia	30–0	Namibia
Try: Giorgadze 37' c Machkhaneli 70' c Kacharava 80+' c Con: Kvirikashvili (3/3); Pen: Kvirikashvili (3/6) 8', 26', 69'	Report

Stade Félix Bollaert, Lens
Attendance: 32,549
Referee: Steve Walsh (New Zealand)

30 September 2007
15:00

France	64–7	Georgia
Try: Poitrenaud 6' c Nyanga 30' c Beauxis 37' c Dominici (2) 45' m, 57' m Bruno 52' c Nallet 63' c Martin 67' m Bonnaire 80' m Con: Beauxis (5/9); Pen: Beauxis (3/3) 4', 18', 24'	Report	Try: Z. Maissuradze 72' c Con: Urjukashvili (1/1)

Stade Vélodrome, Marseille
Attendance: 58,695
Referee: Alan Lewis (Ireland)

=== 2011 ===
Pos	Team	Pld	W	D	L	PF	PA	PD	T	B	Pts	Qualification
1	England	4	4	0	0	137	34	+103	18	2	18	Advanced to the quarter-finals and qualified for the 2015 Rugby World Cup
2	Argentina	4	3	0	1	90	40	+50	10	2	14	Advanced to the quarter-finals and qualified for the 2015 Rugby World Cup
3	Scotland	4	2	0	2	73	59	+14	4	3	11	Eliminated but qualified for 2015 Rugby World Cup
4	Georgia	4	1	0	3	48	90	−42	3	0	4	
5	Romania	4	0	0	4	44	169	−125	3	0	0	

14 September 2011
19:30

Scotland	15–6	Georgia
Pen: Parks (4/7) 24', 34', 71', 76'; Drop: Parks (1/1) 39'	Report	Pen: Kvirikashvili (2/2) 17', 73'

Rugby Park Stadium, Invercargill
Attendance: 10,267
Referee: George Clancy (Ireland)

18 September 2011
18:00

England	41–10	Georgia
Try: Hape (2) 4' c, 21' c Armitage 47' m Tuilagi 62' c Ashton (2) 65' c, 80' m Con: Flood (4/6); Pen: Flood (1/1) 35'	Report	Try: Basilaia 40' c Con: Kvirikashvili (1/1); Pen: Kvirikashvili (1/6) 27'

Otago Stadium, Dunedin
Attendance: 20,117
Referee: Jonathan Kaplan (South Africa)

28 September 2011
19:30

Georgia	25–9	Romania
Try: Gorgodze 56' c Con: Kvirikashvili (1/1); Pen: Kvirikashvili (5/7) 9', 24', 31', 36', 70'; Urjukashvili (1/1) 76'	Report	Pen: Dumbravă (2/4) 12', 34'; Vlaicu (1/1) 72'

Arena Manawatu, Palmerston North
Attendance: 13,228
Referee: Dave Pearson (England)

2 October 2011
13:00

Argentina	25–7	Georgia
Try: Imhoff 32' m Contepomi 68' c Gosio 79' c Con: Contepomi (1/2); Bosch (1/1); Pen: Contepomi (2/4) 51', 60'	Report	Try: Khmaladze 39' c Con: Urjukashvili (1/1)

Arena Manawatu, Palmerston North
Attendance: 13,754
Referee: Alain Rolland (Ireland)

=== 2015 ===
Pos	Team	Pld	W	D	L	PF	PA	PD	T	B	Pts	Qualification
1	New Zealand	4	4	0	0	174	49	+125	25	3	19	Advanced to the quarter-finals and qualified for the 2019 Rugby World Cup
2	Argentina	4	3	0	1	179	70	+109	22	3	15	Advanced to the quarter-finals and qualified for the 2019 Rugby World Cup
3	Georgia	4	2	0	2	53	123	−70	5	0	8	Eliminated but qualified for 2019 Rugby World Cup
4	Tonga	4	1	0	3	70	130	−60	8	2	6	
5	Namibia	4	0	0	4	70	174	−104	8	1	1	

19 September 2015
12:00

Tonga	10–17	Georgia
Try: Vainikolo 72' c Con: Morath (1/1) 73'; Pen: Morath (1/1) 9'	Report	Try: Gorgodze 27' c Tkhilaishvili 56' c Con: Kvirikashvili (2/2) 28', 57'; Pen: Kvirikashvili (1/3) 19'

Kingsholm Stadium, Gloucester
Attendance: 14,200
Referee: Nigel Owens (Wales)

25 September 2015
16:45

Argentina	54–9	Georgia
Try: Lavanini 10' m Cubelli 47' c Imhoff (2) 49' c, 76' m Cordero (2) 53' c, 72' c Landajo 70' c Con: Sánchez (3/4) 48', 51', 54'; Bosch (2/3) 71', 74'; Pen: Sánchez (2/2) 21', 35'; Drop: Sánchez 6'	Report	Pen: Kvirikashvili (3/3) 17', 20', 32'

Kingsholm Stadium, Gloucester
Attendance: 14,256
Referee: JP Doyle (England)

2 October 2015
20:00

New Zealand	43–10	Georgia
Try: Naholo 2' c Savea (3) 8' m, 17' m, 74' c Coles 22' m Read 52' c Fekitoa 77' c Con: Carter (4/7) 3', 53', 75', 78'	Report	Try: Tsiklauri 5' c Con: Malaghuradze (1/1) 6'; Pen: Malaghuradze (1/1) 12'

Millennium Stadium, Cardiff
Attendance: 69,187
Referee: Pascal Gaüzère (France)

7 October 2015
20:00

Namibia	16–17	Georgia
Try: Kotzé 74' c Con: Kotzé (1/1) 76'; Pen: Kotzé (3/3) 2', 18', 71'	Report	Try: Gorgodze 50' c Malaghuradze 55' c Con: Kvirikashvili (2/2) 51', 56'; Pen: Kvirikashvili (1/1) 68'

Sandy Park, Exeter
Attendance: 11,156
Referee: George Clancy (Ireland)

=== 2019 ===
Pos	Team	Pld	W	D	L	PF	PA	PD	T	B	Pts	Qualification
1	Wales	4	4	0	0	136	69	+67	17	3	19	Advanced to the quarter-finals and qualified for the 2023 Rugby World Cup
2	Australia	4	3	0	1	136	68	+68	20	4	16	Advanced to the quarter-finals and qualified for the 2023 Rugby World Cup
3	Fiji	4	1	0	3	110	108	+2	17	3	7	Eliminated but qualified for 2023 Rugby World Cup
4	Georgia	4	1	0	3	65	122	−57	9	1	5	
5	Uruguay	4	1	0	3	60	140	−80	6	0	4	

23 September 2019
19:15 JST (UTC+09)

(1 BP) Wales	43–14	Georgia
Try: Jo. Davies 3' m Tipuric 13' c Adams 19' c L. Williams 40' c T. Williams 65' c North 76' c Con: Biggar (4/5) 14', 20', 40', 66'; Halfpenny (1/1) 77'; Pen: Biggar (1/1) 7'	Report	Try: Mamukashvili 43' c Chilachava 69' c Con: Abzhandadze (2/2) 44', 70'

City of Toyota Stadium, Toyota
Attendance: 35,546
Referee: Luke Pearce (England)

29 September 2019
14:15 JST (UTC+09)

(1 BP) Georgia	33–7	Uruguay
Try: Todua 9' m Giorgadze 30' c Chilachava 43' c Bregvadze 52' c Kveseladze 58' c Con: Abzhandadze (4/5) 30', 44', 53', 59'	Report	Try: Vilaseca 33' c Con: Berchesi (1/1) 34'

Kumagaya Rugby Stadium, Kumagaya
Attendance: 24,895
Referee: Wayne Barnes (England)

3 October 2019
14:15 JST (UTC+09)

Georgia	10–45	Fiji (1 BP)
Try: Gorgodze 53' c Con: Matiashvili (1/1) 55'; Pen: Matiashvili (1/2) 35'	Report	Try: Nayacalevu 20' c Lomani 45' m Tuisova 50' m Radradra (2) 61' c, 76' c Kunatani 68' c Ratuniyarawa 70' c Con: Volavola (5/7) 21', 63', 70', 72', 77'

Hanazono Rugby Stadium, Higashiōsaka
Attendance: 21,069
Referee: Paul Williams (New Zealand)

11 October 2019
19:15 JST (UTC+09)

(1 BP) Australia	27–8	Georgia
Try: White 23' c Koroibete 60' c Dempsey 75' m Genia 79' m Con: To'omua (2/4) 24', 61'; Pen: To'omua (1/1) 37'	Report	Try: Todua 70' m Pen: Matiashvili (1/1) 28'

Shizuoka Stadium Ecopa, Fukuroi
Attendance: 39,802
Referee: Pascal Gaüzère (France)

=== 2023 ===
Pos	Team	Pld	W	D	L	PF	PA	PD	TF	TA	B	Pts	Qualification
1	Wales	4	4	0	0	143	59	+84	17	8	3	19	Advance to knockout stage, and qualification to the 2027 Men's Rugby World Cup
2	Fiji	4	2	0	2	88	83	+5	9	9	3	11 (Note: Head-to-head: Australia 15–22 Fiji)	Advance to knockout stage, and qualification to the 2027 Men's Rugby World Cup
3	Australia	4	2	0	2	90	91	−1	11	8	3	11	Qualification to the 2027 Men's Rugby World Cup
4	Portugal	4	1	1	2	64	103	−39	8	13	0	6	
5	Georgia	4	0	1	3	64	113	−49	7	14	1	3	

Source: World Rugby
Rules for classification: Pool stage tiebreakers
Notes:

9 September 2023
18:00 CEST (UTC+2)

(1 BP) Australia	35–15	Georgia
Try: Petaia 2' m Nawaqanitawase 9' c Donaldson (2) 56' c, 69' c Con: Donaldson (3/4) 7', 57', 70'; Pen: Donaldson (3/3) 14', 21', 31'	Report	Try: Ivanishvili 47' m Gigashvili 80' c Con: Abzhandadze (1/1) 80'; Pen: Matkava (1/1) 6'

Stade de France, Saint-Denis
Attendance: 75,770
Referee: Luke Pearce (England)

23 September 2023
14:00 CEST (UTC+2)

Georgia	18–18	Portugal
Try: Tabutsadze 2' c Zamtaradze 78' m Con: Abzhandadze (1/1) 3'; Pen: Abzhandadze (2/2) 16', 32'	Report	Try: Storti (2) 34' m, 57' c Con: Marques (1/2) 58'; Pen: Marques (2/2) 48', 53'

Stadium de Toulouse, Toulouse
Attendance: 31,889
Referee: Paul Williams (New Zealand)

30 September 2023
17:45 CEST (UTC+2)

Fiji	17–12	Georgia (1 BP)
Try: Nayacalevu 51' c Habosi 68' c Con: Lomani (2/2) 52', 69'; Pen: Lomani (1/2) 65'	Report	Pen: Matkava (2/2) 5', 80'; Niniashvili (2/2) 19', 31'

Nouveau Stade de Bordeaux, Bordeaux
Attendance: 39,862
Referee: Karl Dickson (England)

7 October 2023
15:00 CEST (UTC+2)

(1 BP) Wales	43–19	Georgia
Try: Francis 16' c L. Williams 23' c Rees-Zammit (3) 43' c, 67' c, 74' m North 80' c Con: Costelow (5/6) 17', 24', 44', 69', 80+1'; Pen: Costelow (1/2) 27'	Report	Try: Sharikadze 35' c Karkadze 59' c Niniashvili 62' m Con: Matkava (2/3) 36', 60'

Stade de la Beaujoire, Nantes
Attendance: 33,580
Referee: Mathieu Raynal (France)

== Overall record ==
Country	Pld	W	D	L	F	A	+/−	Win %
Uruguay	2	1	-	1	45	31	14	50
Tonga	1	1	-	-	17	10	7	100
South Africa	1	-	-	1	19	46	-27	0
New Zealand	1	-	-	1	10	43	-33	0
Samoa	1	-	-	1	9	46	-35	0
England	2	-	-	2	16	125	-109	0
Argentina	3	-	-	3	19	112	-93	0
Ireland	1	-	-	1	10	14	-4	0
Scotland	1	-	-	1	6	15	-9	0
Romania	1	1	-	-	25	9	16	100
Namibia	2	2	-	-	47	16	31	100
Fiji	2	-	-	2	22	62	-40	0
France	1	-	-	1	7	64	-57	0
Australia	2	-	-	2	23	62	-39	0
Portugal	1	-	1	-	18	18	0	0
Wales	2	-	-	2	33	86	-53	0
Total	24	5	1	18	326	759	−431	20.83%

== Team records ==
Most points in a tournament

- 65 (2019 in Japan)
- 64 (2023 in France)
- 53 (2015 in England)

Most points in a game

- 33 vs Uruguay (2019)
- 30 vs Namibia (2007)
- 25 vs Romania (2011)

Biggest winning margin

- 30 vs Namibia (2007)
- 26 Vs Uruguay (2019)
- 16 vs Romania (2011)

Highest score against

- 84 vs England (2003)
- 64 vs France (2007)
- 54 vs Argentina (2015)

Biggest losing margin

- 78 vs England (2003)
- 57 vs France (2007)
- 45 vs Argentina (2015)

Most tries in a tournament

- 9 (2019 in Japan)
- 7 (2023 in France)
- 5 (2007 in France)
- 5 (2015 in England)

Most tries in a game

- 5 vs Uruguay (2019)
- 3 vs Namibia (2007)
- 3 vs Wales (2023)
- 2 vs Tonga (2015)
- 2 vs Namibia (2015)
- 2 vs Wales (2019)
- 2 vs Australia (2023)

== Individual records ==
Most appearances

- 15 Mamuka Gorgodze
- 15 Merab Kvirikashvili
- 13 Davit Kacharava

Most appearances as captain

- 6 Irakli Abuseridze

Most points overall

- 86 Merab Kvirikashvili
- 23 Paliko Jimsheladze
- 22 Tedo Abzhandadze

Most points in a game

- 17 vs Romania – Merab Kvirikashvili (New Zealand 2011)
- 15 vs Namibia – Merab Kvirikashvili (France 2007)
- 11 vs South Africa – Paliko Jimsheladze (Australia 2003)

Most tries overall

- 4 Mamuka Gorgodze
- 2 Levan Chilachava
- 2 Alexander Todua

Most penalty goals

- 22 Merab Kvirikashvili
- 6 Paliko Jimsheladze
- 3 Malkhaz Urjukashvili
- 3 Luka Matkava

Most penalty goals in a game

- 5 vs Romania – Merab Kvirikashvili (New Zealand 2011)
- 3 vs Uruguay – Merab Kvirikashvili (Australia 2003)
- 3 vs Namibia – Merab Kvirikashvili (France 2007)
- 3 vs Argentina – Merab Kvirikashvili (England 2015)

Most drop goals

- 1 Paliko Jimsheladze
