= Malkhaz =

- Gender: Male
- Language: Georgian

Origin
- Region of origin: Georgia

Malkhaz (Georgian: მალხაზ) is a Georgian masculine given name. Notable people with the name include:

- Malkhaz Abdushelishvili (1926–1998), Georgian scientist, anthropologist and academician
- Malkhaz Akishbaia (born 1972), Abkhaz-Georgian politician
- Malkhaz Arziani (born 1964), Georgian footballer
- Malkhaz Asatiani (born 1981), Georgian footballer
- Malkhaz Cheishvili (born 19??), Georgian rugby coach
- Malkhaz Urjukashvili (born 1980), Georgian rugby player
- Malkhaz Zarkua (born 1986), Georgian freestyle wrestler
