= Kvirikashvili =

Kvirikashvili is a Georgian surname (Georgian: კვირიკაშვილი). Notable people with the surname include:

- Giorgi Kvirikashvili (born 1967), Georgian politician
- Merab Kvirikashvili (born 1983), Georgian rugby union player
