= Drotsky =

Drotsky is a surname. Notable people with the surname include:

- John Drotsky (born 1984), Namibian rugby union player
- Martinus Drotsky, for whom Drotsky's Cavern (Gcwihaba), cave in Botswana, was named

== See also ==
- Trotsky (surname)
