= Tim Lane (rugby union) =

- Born: Timothy Alan Lane; 24 November 1959 (age 66) Coonabarabran, NSW
- Height: 1.78 m (5 ft 10 in)
- Weight: 83 kg (13 st 1 lb)

Rugby union career
- Position(s): Centre, Fly-half
Amateur team(s)
Years	Team	Apps	(Points)
1980	Randwick		
1981–87	Wests Bulldogs		
Provincial / State sides
Years	Team	Apps	(Points)
1981–87	Queensland		
International career
Years	Team	Apps	(Points)
1985	Australia	3	(82t)
Coaching career
- Years: Team
- 1997, 2011–12: Manly
- 2000–01: Clermont Ferrand
- 2003: Golden Cats
- 2005–06: Ricoh Black Rams
- 2007–08: Toulon
- 2008–10: Georgia
- 2013–March 15: Lyon OU

Tim Lane (born 24 November 1959, in Coonabarabran, New South Wales) is an Australian rugby union coach and former player.

== Playing career ==
Lane played either in the centres or at fly-half. He represented Queensland from 1981 to 1987, and also won three caps for the Wallabies in 1985.

== Coaching career ==
He started his coaching career at the Manly club in Sydney where in one season took them to an undefeated premiership. In 1998 he took on the job of an assistant coach for the Wallabies, coaching the back-line during which time the team won the Bledisloe Cup and Tri- Nations and the 1999 Rugby World Cup in Wales. In 2000 he took over coaching at Clermont Ferrand in France where he took the club to the final in his first season.

At the end of the 2000-01 French season he joined the Springboks as an assistant coach for the back-line. Following coaching appointments with the Cats, the Italian national side, the Ricoh Black Rams and CA Brive he joined Toulon in January 2007 for the remainder of the 2006/07 season as general manager and backs coach. He was successful in helping the club in its bid for promotion to the Top 14.

Lane was appointed head coach of the Georgia national rugby union team in February 2008. Despite achieving good results, he was controversially sacked from the Georgian job in 2010. He then returned to Australia and took up the head coaching position again at Manly for the 2011 Shute Shield season.

Lane was appointed as head coach of Lyon OU in 2013, winning the Rugby Pro D2 title with the club and gaining promotion to the French Top 14. However, with six rounds remaining in the 2014–15 season, he was sacked by Lyon with a 7–13 win–loss record at the club.

Sporting positions
Preceded by (Georgia (country)) Malkhaz Cheishvili	Georgia National Rugby Union Coach; 2008-2010	Succeeded by (Scotland) Richie Dixon
