= Robert Herridge (sportsman) =

Namibian cricketer and rugby union international

Personal information
- Full name: Robert Jacobus Herridge
- Born: 12 May 1989 (age 37); Outjo, Kunene, South West Africa
- Height: 5 ft 10 in (1.78 m)
- Batting: Right-handed
- Bowling: Right-arm medium

Domestic team information
- Years: Team
- 2014/15–2015/16: Namibia

Career statistics
Competition	First-class
Matches	2
Runs scored	0
Batting average	0.00
100s/50s	–/–
Top score	0
Balls bowled	156
Wickets	1
Bowling average	115.00
5 wickets in innings	–
10 wickets in match	–
Best bowling	1/76
Catches/stumpings	1/–
- Source: Cricinfo, 7 February 2022

Robert Jacobus Herridge (born 12 May 1989) is a Namibian former rugby union international and first-class cricketer.

== Biography ==
Herridge was born at Outjo in the Kunene Region, of what was then South West Africa, in May 1989. He played rugby union at under-19 level for Namibia in 2008, when he was studying at the time in South Africa. The following year he gained three Test caps for Namibia, playing once against Portugal and twice against Tunisia. Herridge also played first-class cricket for the Namibian cricket team in the CSA 3-Day Cup, against Northerns in the 2014–15 season, and Gauteng in the 2015–16 season. Herridge struggled in his two appearances, failing to score any runs, while taking just a single wicket from 26-overs of his medium pace bowling. He was named in Namibia's squad for their Intercontinental Cup fixture against Hong Kong in May 2015, but did not make the Namibian starting eleven.
