= Goderdzi Shvelidze =

Georgia international rugby union player

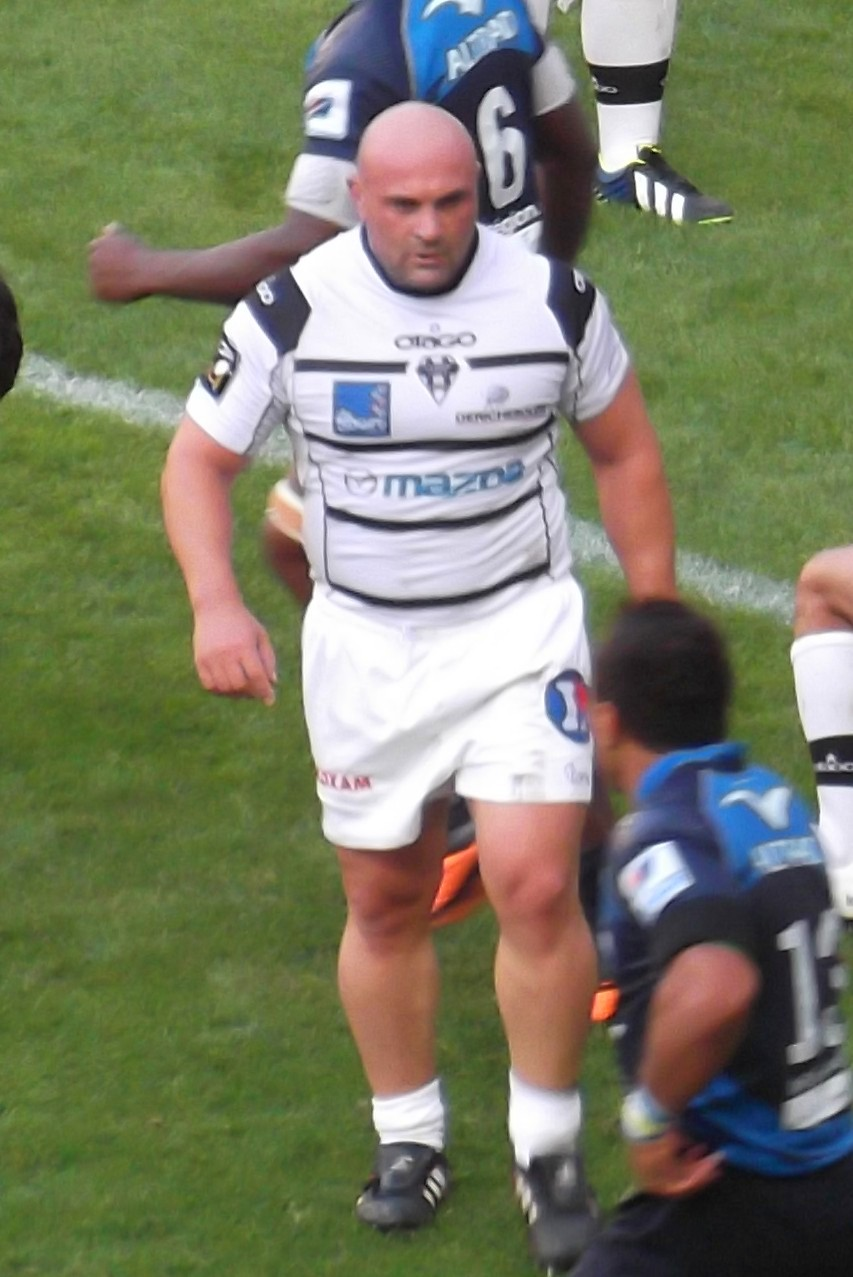
- Born: 17 April 1978 (age 48) Rustavi, Georgia
- Height: 1.77 m (5 ft 9 1/2 in)
- Weight: 110 kg (17 st 5 lb; 243 lb)

Rugby union career
- Position: Prop
Senior career
Years	Team	Apps	(Points)
2001-2004	Béziers	45	(5)
2004-2008	Clermont	67	(15)
2008-2010	Montauban	51	(0)
2010-2012	Montpellier	21	(5)
2012-2016	Brive	9	(0)
International career
Years	Team	Apps	(Points)
1998–2011	Georgia	64	(35)
- Correct as of 14 May 2019

Goderdzi Shvelidze (Georgian: გოდერძი შველიძე; born 17 April 1978, in Rustavi) is a former Georgian rugby union player. He played as a prop.

He played for the Georgian Army club and the Georgia national rugby union team. He played at club level in France for Béziers, Clermont Auvergne, Montauban, Montpellier, and Brive.

He had 64 caps for Georgia, with 7 tries, 35 points on aggregate.
