= Giorgi Shkinin =

Georgia international rugby union player

George Shkinin
- Born: 7 March 1983 (age 43) Tbilisi, Soviet Union
- Height: 1.78 m (5 ft 10 in)
- Weight: 70 kg (154 lb)

Rugby union career
- Position: Wing
Senior career
Years	Team	Apps	(Points)
	Blois Hooligana Armia	57 125	(78 498)
- Correct as of 2007-09-16
International career
Years	Team	Apps	(Points)
2004-	Georgia	21	(25)
- Correct as of 2007-09-16

George Shkinin (Georgian: გიორგი შკინინი; born 7 March 1983 in Tbilisi, Soviet Union; also known as Gosha, Goga, Georgi, and Giorgi, surname alternately spelled Shkinini) is a Georgian rugby union player. He was first capped for Georgia in 2004, and has played for his country 21 times since then. Playing at wing, He started his career in Georgian club "Hooligana" from Tbilisi. Shkinin has played for the Blois club in France and returned to his old club "Hooligana" in Tbilisi, Georgia. He is player and coach of kids in "Hooligana" till now. He has scored five tries playing for Georgia. Also Shkinin is captain of national Georgian rugby sevens team.

Shkinin was in the Georgia squad for the 2007 Rugby World Cup, and scored Georgia's only try in their 10–14 loss to Ireland national rugby union team on 15 September 2007. His try came from an intercepted pass off Peter Stringer. Despite Georgia being unable to upset Ireland, planet-rugby.com named Shkinin their man of the match for "his big-hearted efforts in attack and defence."
