= Will Skinner (rugby union) =

English rugby union player

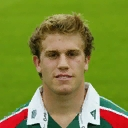
- Born: William Skinner; 8 February 1984 (age 42) Northampton, England
- Height: 1.80 m (5 ft 11 in)
- Weight: 97 kg (15 st 4 lb)
- School: Bedford School

Rugby union career
- Position: Flanker
Amateur team(s)
Years	Team	Apps	(Points)
- Olney Rugby Club
2002–06	Leicester Tigers	34	(20)
2006–13	Harlequins	149	(15)
International career
Years	Team	Apps	(Points)
2007–08	England Saxons	10	(0)
National sevens team
Years	Team		Comps
2003	England		2

William John Skinner (born 8 February 1984 in Northampton) is an English former rugby union player who played openside flanker for Leicester Tigers and Harlequins.

He began his rugby career at Bedford School before representing England at U-16, U-18 and U-21 level. He came through the Leicester Tigers youth setup where many drew comparison between the small, blond, pacy openside and his mentor, Tigers legend Neil Back. Long-term injury and lack of versatility, however, saw him leave Tigers in the summer of 2006 to move to Quins where he linked up with former Tigers' Director of Rugby and back row legend Dean Richards.

Skinner represented the England Sevens team at Brisbane in early 2003. Skinner represented England Saxons at the 2007 Churchill Cup.

Skinner was called into the England Saxons side that defeated Ireland A on 1 February 2008.

He captained the England Saxons to victory at the 2008 Churchill Cup.

Injury forced his retirement in 2013.
