= Jim Regan (rugby) =

Wales international rugby league & union footballer

James Regan
Personal information
- Full name: James Regan
- Born: unknown Wales
- Died: unknown

Playing information

Rugby union
- Position: Hooker
Club
| Years | Team | Pld | T | G | FG | P |
|---|---|---|---|---|---|---|
| ≤1939–39 | Cardiff RFC |

Rugby league
- Position: Hooker
Club
| Years | Team | Pld | T | G | FG | P |
|---|---|---|---|---|---|---|
| 1939–≥39 | Huddersfield |
Representative
| Years | Team | Pld | T | G | FG | P |
| 1939 | Wales | 1 |

James Regan (fl. 1939) was a Welsh rugby union, and professional rugby league footballer who played in the 1930s. He played club level rugby union (RU) for Cardiff RFC, as a hooker, and representative level rugby league (RL) for Wales, and at club level for Huddersfield, as a hooker.

== International honours ==
Jim Regan won a cap for Wales (RL) while at Huddersfield in 1939.
