= Alberto Vernet Basualdo =

Argentine rugby union player (born 1982)

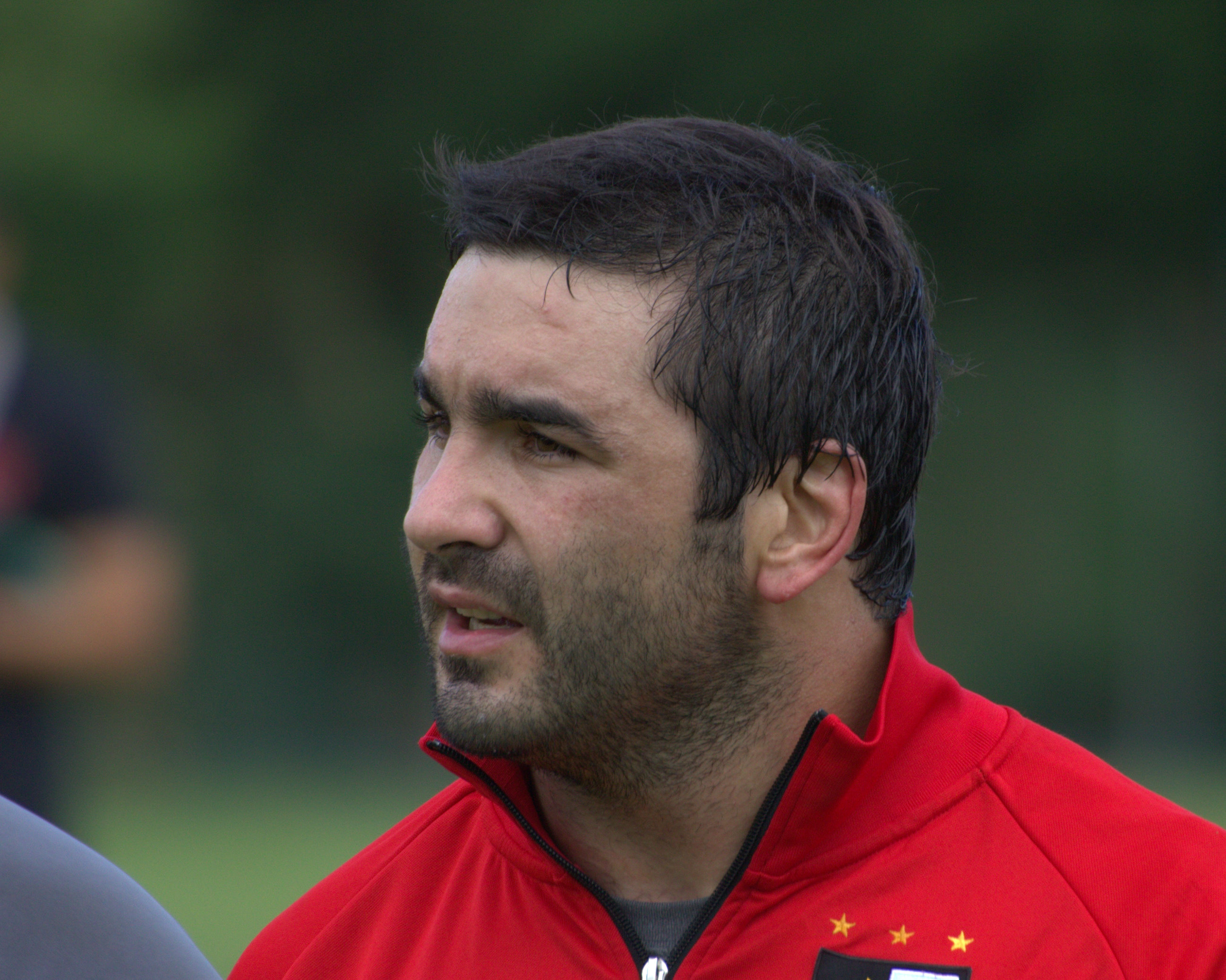
- Born: June 8, 1982 (age 44) Buenos Aires, Argentina
- Height: 1.80 m (5 ft 11 in)
- Weight: 109 kg (17 st 2 lb)

Rugby union career
- Position: Hooker
Senior career
| Years | Team | Apps | (Points) |
| 2007–2011 | Toulouse | 0 | (0) |
| 2002–2007 | Alumni | | |
- Correct as of 25 september 2007
International career
| Years | Team | Apps | (Points) |
| 2004–present | Argentina | 12 | (0) |
- Correct as of 21 November 2011

Alberto Vernet Basualdo (born June 8, 1982) is an Argentine rugby union player. His position is hooker. He started playing in Buenos Aires for Asociación Alumni and for Toulouse in France four years; he also played for the Argentine national rugby team, his debut for Los Pumas was on December 4, 2004.

In 2005 he suffered a career threatening neck injury displacing the 5th vertebra and the Intervertebral disc, but he recovered and was selected to represent Argentina at the 2007 Rugby World Cup. He joined Toulouse after the end of the tournament. In 2010 he was a replacement for the final as Toulouse won the Heineken Cup.
