= David Barnes (rugby union) =

English rugby union player

- Born: David Michael Barnes; 12 July 1976 (age 50) Leicester, England
- Height: 1.83 m (6 ft 0 in)
- Weight: 112 kg (17 st 9 lb)
- School: Sedbergh School
- University: Durham University
- Occupation: RFU Head of Discipline

Rugby union career
- Position: Prop
Amateur team(s)
Years	Team	Apps	(Points)
14	Stoneygate FC		
–	Kendal RUFC		
Senior career
Years	Team	Apps	(Points)
1995–1998	Newcastle	3	(0)
1997	West Hartlepool	10	(5)
1998–2000	Harlequins	45	(5)
2000–	Bath	266	(30)
International career
Years	Team	Apps	(Points)
1997–2011	England Saxons		

David Michael Barnes (born 12 July 1976 in Leicester) was a rugby union prop for Bath Rugby in the Guinness Premiership retiring in 2011. He was appointed head of Discipline at the Rugby Football Union in July 2017.

Barnes was educated at Nevill Holt, Sedbergh School and Durham University. Whilst at Durham, he competed for Kendal RUFC. His performances then led to him playing for West Hartlepool R.F.C., during the 1996–97 season, when they were in the top tier.

He subsequently played for the Newcastle Falcons when they won the 1997–98 Premiership. It was during 1997 that Barnes was first involved with England A.

Barnes then joined Harlequin F.C., where he understudied Jason Leonard and played 45 games during his two seasons at the club, before moving to Bath Rugby in 2000. Before retiring from the sport, due to injury, in 2011, he had played 266 first team games for Bath Rugby and a career total of over 200 Premiership games.

In 2006, Barnes featured in an England XV side against the Barbarians. He then captained England Saxons at the 2006 Churchill Cup.

Barnes played in the final of the 2007–08 European Challenge Cup, as Bath defeated the Worcester Warriors.

Barnes, who is uncapped, was called up to Martin Johnson's squad for the 2009 Autumn Internationals. Barnes withdrew from the squad due to an injury inflicted upon him by teammate Duncan Bell. Barnes is the chairman of The Professional Rugby Players' Association.

Barnes also represented the Barbarians FC on four occasions with his last appearance being in the 29–23 victory over Ireland on 4 June 2010. On retirement, he joined the committee of the famous club and currently still holds this position.

== Charity work ==
Throughout and after his Rugby Union career, Barnes has taken on various challenges that he has used to raise money for specific charitable causes.

In 2008 he was part of a 4-man team completing the Greene King IPA Challenge trek of Kilimanjaro. This challenge raised several £000's for the PRA Benevolent Fund (now Restart) and Cancer Research UK.

In 2011, Barnes was one of the primary organizers for the AXA Wealth Kilimanjaro Challenge that saw 42 people climb Kilimanjaro and raise over £225,000 for charities, including Help for Heroes, Restart and the Rugby Football Union Injured Players Foundation. This challenge was covered by the TV program, Total Rugby and shown in three parts,Total Rugby – Kilimanjaro Pt1. As part of this climb, Barnes encouraged Andy Blyth, an ex-teammate at Newcastle Falcons, who had suffered a serious spinal injury playing for Sale Rugby Club, in 2000 to join the trip. In total 39 of the 42 people reached the summit of Kilimanjaro, including Blyth.

Having transformed himself from an 18 stone Prop into a long-distance runner, he has completed numerous Marathons and Ultra Marathon events. 2014 saw Barnes take on the "toughest race on earth" the 29th Marathon Des Sables. As part of a 3-man team, including injured soldier Martin Hewitt – British Forces News- he successfully completed the 7 day, 150 mile, Ultra Marathon across the Sahara Desert. Once again he used this experience to raise money for charity and supported Help for Heroes, Restart and the Bath Rugby Foundation. His efforts were covered by Total Rugby in Catch up with David Barnes.

December 2014, saw Barnes take on a new challenge to support the military charity, Walking with the Wounded. Accompanied by Stuart Doughty, whom he had also run the 2014 MDS with, he supported the fundraising campaign, Walking home for Christmas, by running non-stop from London to Bath, a distance of over 100 Miles.

== Relatives ==
Barnes is married to Elie Barnes since 2012 the former Welsh Hockey international who retired in 2015 with 96 caps.
