= Heini Bock =

Namibian rugby union scrum-half

- Born: 28 December 1981 (age 44) Oranjemund, South West Africa
- Height: 5 ft 11 in (1.80 m)
- Weight: 178 lb (81 kg; 12.7 st)

Rugby union career
- Position(s): Fullback, Wing
International career
| Years | Team | Apps | (Points) |
| 2005–2011 | Namibia | 23 | (20) |

Heini Bock (born 28 December 1981 in Oranjemund) is a Namibian rugby union scrum-half. He is a member of the Namibia national rugby union team and participated with the squad at the 2007 Rugby World Cup.
