= Michael MacKenzie (rugby union) =

Namibia international rugby union player

- Born: 13 September 1983 (age 43) Windhoek
- Height: 1.85 m (6 ft 1 in)
- Weight: 95 kg (209 lb; 15.0 st)

Rugby union career
- Position: Flanker
International career
Years	Team	Apps	(Points)
2004–2007	Namibia	8	(10)

Michael Valentine MacKenzie (born 13 September 1983 in Windhoek) is a Namibian rugby union player. He plays as a prop.

MacKenzie had 8 caps for Namibia national rugby union team, from 2004 to 2007, with 2 tries scored, 10 points in aggregate. He participated with the squad at the 2007 Rugby World Cup, playing in three games. He has been absent from the National Team since then.
