= Rati Urushadze =

Georgian rugby union player (born 1975)

Rati Urushadze (born Tbilisi, 22 September 1975) is a Georgian rugby union player. He plays as a lock and as a flanker.

He moved to France, where he played for Nice, in 2006/07, in the Fédérale 2, and for Lons-le-Saunier, in 2007/08, in the Fédérale 1. He played for Enisey STM-Krasnoyarsk, for 2012/13, in the Russian League. He is playing for RC Kochebi Bolnisi, in Georgia Championship for 2013/14 season.

He had 41 caps for Georgia, from 1997 to 2009, scoring 5 tries, 25 points on aggregate. He was called for the 2007 Rugby World Cup, playing in three games and remaining scoreless.
