= Johannes Meyer (rugby union) =

Namibia international rugby union player

- Born: 19 February 1981 (age 45)
- Height: 1.9 m (6 ft 3 in)
- Weight: 125 kg (276 lb; 19.7 st)

Rugby union career
- Position: Prop
International career
Years	Team	Apps	(Points)
2003–2007	Namibia	16	(5)

Johannes Meyer (born 19 February 1981 in Bloefanter) is a Namibian rugby union prop. He is a member of the Namibia national rugby union team and participated with the squad at the 2007 Rugby World Cup.
