= Bradley Langenhoven =

Namibia international rugby union player

- Born: Bradley Langenhoven; 3 December 1983 (age 42) Walvis Bay, South Africa
- Height: 1.91 m (6 ft 3 in)
- Weight: 89 kg (196 lb)

Rugby union career
- Position(s): wing, centre
Amateur team(s)
Years	Team	Apps	(Points)
- North-West University
2008–present	SC 1880 Frankfurt		
International career
Years	Team	Apps	(Points)
2002 –	Namibia	5	(10)
- Correct as of 17 September 2007

Bradley Langenhoven (born 3 December 1983 in Walvis Bay) is a rugby union player who plays for Namibia. He plays as a wing or center.

Langenhoven made his international debut against South Africa on 15 August 2007, in which he scored a try. Langenhoven was in the Namibian squad for the 2007 World Cup finals. He played in all four matches, scoring a try in the 10–87 loss against the hosts France. He is playing currently for SC 1880 Frankfurt, current German champion.
