= Besso Udessiani =

Georgian rugby union player

Besarion Udessiani, known as Besso Udessiani (born Tbilisi, 14 March 1978) is a Georgian rugby union player. He plays as number-eight.

Udessiani played in France for Châlon, Saint-Étienne (2009/10) and Mâcon, since 2010/11.

He had 42 caps for Georgia, from 2001 to 2011, scoring 8 tries, 40 points on aggregate. He was called for the 2007 Rugby World Cup, playing in two games but without scoring.
