= Otar Barkalaia =

Georgian rugby union player

- Born: February 17, 1984 (age 42)
- Height: 1.75 m (5 ft 9 in)
- Weight: 75 kg (165 lb; 11.8 st)

Rugby union career
- Position: Fly-half
International career
Years	Team	Apps	(Points)
2002-2009	Georgia	37	(49)

Otar Barkalaia (born 17 February 1984 in Tbilisi) is a Georgian rugby union player who plays as a fly-half.

Barkalaia played for Figeac, in France. He currently plays for VPC Andorra XV, in Andorra.

He has 37 caps for Georgia, since 2002, with 8 conversions, 10 penalties and 1 drop goal scored, 49 points in aggregate. He was called for the 2007 Rugby World Cup, playing two games. His greatest success as a player was the win at the Six Nations B for the 2008 edition.
