= Lu-Wayne Botes =

Namibia international rugby union player

- Born: 14 July 1983 (age 43) Johannesburg, South Africa
- Height: 1.89 m (6 ft 2 1/2 in)
- Weight: 89 kg (196 lb; 14.0 st)

Rugby union career
- Position: Centre
International career
Years	Team	Apps	(Points)
2006–2007	Namibia	9	(10)

Lu-Wayne Botes (born 14 July 1983, in Johannesburg) is a Namibian rugby union centre with University of Johannesburg. He played with Namibia at the 2007 Rugby World Cup.
