= Ilia Maisuradze =

Georgia international rugby union player

Ilia Maissuradze
- Born: 31 July 1977 (age 49) Tbilisi

Rugby union career
- Position(s): centre, flanker
International career
Years	Team	Apps	(Points)
1997-2007	Georgia		
Coaching career
- Years: Team
- –: The Black Lion (Assistant)

Ilia Maissuradze (born Tbilisi, 31 July 1977) is a Georgian former rugby union player and current coach. He played as a centre and as flanker. He is an assistant coach of The Black Lion.

He played for Stade Nantais, in France and RK Heusenstamm in Germany.

He had 18 caps for Georgia, from 1997 to 2007, scoring 1 try, 5 points on aggregate. He was called for the 2007 Rugby World Cup, playing in two games but remaining scoreless.
