= Tertius Losper =

Namibia international rugby union player

- Born: Tertius Claude Losper; 22 November 1985 (age 40) Windhoek
- Height: 6 ft 2 in (1.88 m)
- Weight: 188 lb (85 kg; 13.4 st)

Rugby union career
- Position(s): Fullback, Fly-half
International career
Years	Team	Apps	(Points)
2007–11	Namibia	10	(24)

Tertius Losper (born 22 November 1985 in Windhoek) is a Namibian rugby union fullback. He is a member of the Namibia national rugby union team and participated with the squad at the 2007 and 2011 Rugby World Cups.
