= Merab Kvirikashvili =

Georgia international rugby union & league player

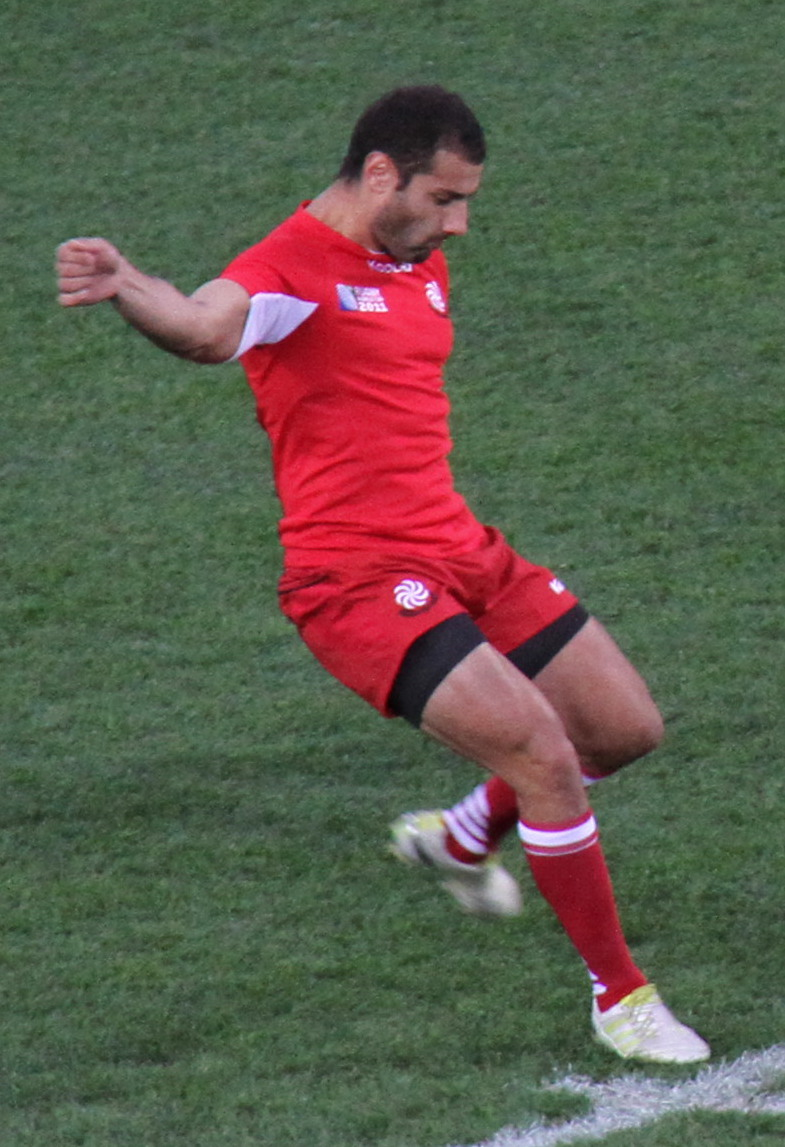
- Kvirikashvili in 2011
- Born: 27 December 1983 (age 42) Tbilisi, Georgian SSR, Soviet Union
- Height: 1.77 m (5 ft 10 in)
- Weight: 80 kg (12 st 8 lb; 176 lb)

Rugby union career
- Position(s): Fly-half, Fullback, Scrum-half
Senior career
Years	Team	Apps	(Points)
–2006	Lelo Saracens		
2006–2008	Pau	16	(54)
2008–2009	Massy	16	(188)
2009–2011	Figeac	19	(218)
2011–2013	Saint-Junien	27	(318)
2013–2014	Vienne	12	(88)
2014–17	Montluçon	14	(137)
2017-	Lelo Saracens		
International career
Years	Team	Apps	(Points)
2003–2018	Georgia	115	(840)
- Correct as of 23 June 2018
National sevens team
Years	Team		Comps
- Georgia 7s
- Rugby league career

Playing information
- Position: Five-eighth
Representative
Years	Team	Pld	T	G	FG	P
2006	Georgia	2	4	14	2	46

Merab "Meko" Kvirikashvili (Georgian: მერაბ კვირიკაშვილი; born 27 December 1983) is a Georgian rugby union player. He started his career as a scrum-half but now plays as a fly-half and occasional fullback and is the all-time leading points scorer for the Georgia national rugby union team. He has also represented the Georgia national rugby league team and Georgia national rugby sevens team.

== Domestic career ==
Kvirikashvili was born 27 December 1983, Tbilisi, Georgian SSR, Soviet Union. He left Georgia in 2006 for Pro D2 side Pau, and has since moved on to three other French clubs in Fédérale 1 in Massy, Figeac and most recently Saint-Junien where he joined after the 2011 World Cup and currently plays. He has not spent more than two seasons at one club during his stay in France.

== International career ==
Kvirikashvili made his Georgia debut as a teenager in 2003 against Portugal, and made the squad for Georgia's first ever appearance in a World Cup later that year, playing in all four of Georgia's matches from the bench.

However he failed to establish himself in the Georgian side over the next couple of years, with Irakli Abuseridze and Bidzina Samkharadze both ahead of him for selection in the scrum half position. But in 2007 he switched to fly half and in his first start for his country in the position Georgia beat Romania away in Bucharest, he has remained a regular member of the Georgian side ever since.

He was an important player in Georgia's 2007 World Cup campaign, starting all four matches and he showed good form against Ireland as Georgia narrowly lost 14–10 and was named man of the match in Georgia's first ever World Cup win against Namibia.

After the 2007 World Cup Kvirikashvili was moved to full back to accommodate a new fly half Lasha Malaghuradze. In 2010 he broke a record he previously shared with Paliko Jimsheladze for most points scored for Georgia in a match, with 32 points in Georgia's 77–3 thrashing of Germany. Later that year he also kicked a last minute conversion for Georgia to defeat the USA 19–17 in Tbilisi.

After Malaghuradze suffered an injury and then a loss of form, Kvirikashvili returned to the first choice fly half position in 2011 helping Georgia to an undefeated season in the European Nations Cup.

However his fortunes were more mixed during the World Cup later that year as he failed to replicate the good form he showed in the 2007 tournament. Notably against England, Georgia were competing well but Kvirikashvili failed to capitalise on England's indiscipline and the Georgian forwards hard work and missed five penalties which would have put Georgia in a very competitive position in the match. He recovered to a better performance scoring 17 points in the win against Romania in the next match, but was dropped for the final match with Argentina.

Kvirikashvili returned to the starting position in 2012 though and started every game for Georgia that year, and with some better kicking performances he broke the Georgian record for most points scored in a calendar year.

=== National records ===
Kvirikashvili is Georgia's all-time leading points scorer, overtaking Pavle Jimsheladze's previous record during the 46–0 thrashing of Russia in 2012 on his 60th cap. He also holds the record for most points scored in a match for Georgia with 32 against Germany in 2010. In 2012 he broke the Georgian record previously held by Pavle Jimsheladze for most points in a calendar year with 91 in 8 matches.

== Road accident ==
In July 2016, Kvirikashvili was involved in a car accident on the Kutaisi-Samtredia highway, while travelling with fellow rugby player Giorgi Lominadze and their respective wives. Lominadze and his wife survived, but Merab's wife and mother of their four children died in hospital, as did three passengers travelling in another vehicle involved in the accident.
