= Tinus du Plessis =

Namibia international rugby union player

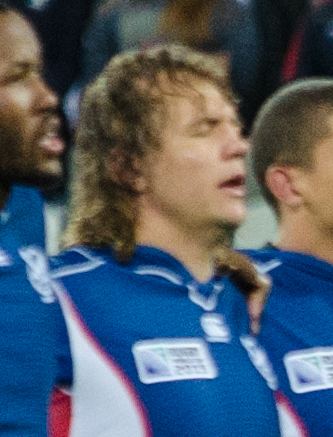
- Born: 20 May 1984 (age 42) Windhoek, South West Africa
- Height: 1.88 m (6 ft 2 in)
- Weight: 108 kg (238 lb; 17 st 0 lb)
- School: Windhoek High School
- Notable relative: Anton Bresler (cousin)

Rugby union career
- Position: Flanker / Number 8
- Current team: Welwitschias
Senior career
Years	Team	Apps	(Points)
2006–2008	Cornish Pirates		
2008–2010	Rotherham Titans		
2011	Welwitschias	8	(15)
2011–2013	Wasps	10	(0)
2015	Welwitschias	1	(0)
2016	London Scottish	7	(10)
2016	Welwitschias	1	(0)
- Correct as of 22 July 2018
International career
Years	Team	Apps	(Points)
2006–2016	Namibia	53	(45)
- Correct as of 22 July 2018

Tinus du Plessis (born 20 May 1984 in Windhoek) is a Namibian rugby union player and a member of the Namibia national rugby union team. He is a back-row player who plays on both flanks and at number eight.

== Early life ==
Du Plessis attended Windhoek High School in Windhoek and is a graduate from Stellenbosch University. In 2003, he attended Gisborne Boys' High School and played first XV rugby in the Super 8 competition in New Zealand.

== Club career ==
He has played club rugby in Namibia for Wanderers RFC, and professionally in England for Rotherham Titans RFC. He was named Rotherham's player of the year in 2009. In December 2011 he joined London Wasps, on a deal taking him through to the end of the season. Having impressed during his time at Wasps Du Plessis was awarded a two-year contract. Du Plessis signed for English Championship club London Scottish for the remainder of the 2015–2016 season.

== International career ==
He was selected for the Namibian squad to play in the 2007 Rugby World Cup where he made three appearances. Having appeared in the Africa Cup in 2008 and 2009 and the RWC 2011 Qualifiers he now has 23 full international caps. He was a member of the victorious Namibia Squad that won the 2010 IRB Nations Cup which went alongside their 2009 African Cup win.

He received the Man of the Match award in a 2011 Rugby World Cup match against Wales in which his Wasps teammate Heinz Koll scored a try. However Namibia lost the match 81–7.
