= Revaz Gigauri =

Georgian rugby union player

Revaz Gigauri (born 9 May 1984, in Kazbegi) is a Georgian rugby union player who plays as a fullback and as a centre.

Gigauri moved to France, where he has been playing for Montluçon Rugby (2006/07–2007/08), RC Massy (2008/09), GS Figeac (2009/10) and Boulogne-Billancourt, since 2010/11.

He has currently 34 caps for Georgia, since 2006, with 2 tries scored, 10 points on aggregate. He was called for the 2007 Rugby World Cup, playing three games, and for the 2011 Rugby World Cup, playing three games once again but remaining scoreless.
