= Mamuka Magrakvelidze =

Georgia international rugby union player

- Born: August 12, 1977 (age 49)
- Height: 1.9 m (6 ft 3 in)
- Weight: 120 kg (265 lb; 18 st 13 lb)

Rugby union career
- Position: Prop
Senior career
Years	Team	Apps	(Points)
- Montpellier
–	Racing Métro		
–	Tarbes		
International career
Years	Team	Apps	(Points)
1998-2007	Georgia	20	(10)

Mamuka Magrakvelidze (Georgian: მამუკა მაგრაქველიძე; born 12 August 1977) is a Georgian rugby union player, currently playing in the French professional Pro D2, for the Tarbes Pyrénées Rugby club. He previously played for other French clubs, the Montpellier Hérault RC and the Racing Metro 92 Paris.

Magrakvelidze is also an international player for the Georgia national team. He played for Georgia at the 2007 Rugby World Cup in France.
