= Jurie van Tonder =

Namibia international rugby union player

- Born: April 9, 1980 (age 46)
- Height: 1.82 m (5 ft 11 1/2 in)
- Weight: 75 kg (165 lb; 11 st 11 lb)

Rugby union career
- Position: Scrum-half
International career
Years	Team	Apps	(Points)
2004–2009	Namibia	17	(15)

Jurie van Tonder (born 9 August 1980 in Windhoek) is a Namibian rugby union scrum-half. Van Tonder competed for the Namibia national rugby union team at the 2007 Rugby World Cup.
