= John Drotsky =

Namibian rugby union scrum-half

- Born: 6 June 1984 (age 42)
- Height: 1.78 m (5 ft 10 in)
- Weight: 83 kg (183 lb; 13 st 1 lb)

Rugby union career
- Position: Scrum-half
International career
Years	Team	Apps	(Points)
2006–2008	Namibia	2	(0)

John Drotsky (born 16 June 1984, in Rehoboth) is a Namibian rugby union scrum-half. He is a member of the Namibia national rugby union team and participated with the squad at the 2007 Rugby World Cup.
