= Marius Visser =

Namibia international rugby union player

- Born: 24 April 1982 (age 44)
- Height: 6 ft 3 in (1.91 m)
- Weight: 286 lb (130 kg; 20.4 st)

Rugby union career
- Position: Prop
International career
Years	Team	Apps	(Points)
2007–2011	Namibia	18	(5)

Marius Visser (born 24 April 1982 in Walvis Bay) is a rugby union player for Namibia and the heaviest player at the 2007 Rugby World Cup at 140 kilograms. While due to play for the Lyon team subsequent to the World Cup, he retired after the discovery of irreversible spinal problems.

In 2009, he returned to the Namibian national team, apparently able to continue playing after earlier worries that injury ended his career.
