= Jacques Nieuwenhuis =

Namibia international rugby union player

- Born: 23 March 1980 (age 46) Brakpan, South Africa
- Height: 1.88 m (6 ft 2 in)
- Weight: 94 kg (207 lb; 14 st 11 lb)
- School: Hoërskool Hoogland, Brakpan

Rugby union career
- Position: Flanker / Number eight
Youth career
- 1998–2002: Falcons
Amateur team(s)
Years	Team	Apps	(Points)
2013–2014	Brakpan	8	(15)
Senior career
Years	Team	Apps	(Points)
2003–2007	Falcons	91	(95)
2008–2011	Aurillac	75	(30)
2012	Falcons	9	(15)
- Correct as of 27 March 2015
International career
Years	Team	Apps	(Points)
2007–2011	Namibia	23	(30)
- Correct as of 27 March 2015

Jacques Nieuwenhuis (born 23 March 1980 in Brakpan, South Africa) is a former professional rugby union player and currently a referee on the contenders squad panel of the South African Rugby Referees' Association.

Through a Namibian mother, he qualified to play for Namibia and represented them at the 2007 and 2011 Rugby World Cups. He also made 100 first class appearances for South African provincial side the Falcons and 75 for French side Aurillac. He regularly played, as a flanker or number eight.

== Namibia ==
He scored a try in Namibia's first match in the 2007 Rugby World Cup in a game against Ireland. He later blotted his copybook by being the first Namibian to be sent off at a World Cup against France.
