= Davit Khinchagishvili =

Georgian rugby union player

- Born: July 24, 1982 (age 44) Tbilisi, Georgian SSR, Soviet Union
- Height: 1.81 m (5 ft 11 1/2 in)
- Weight: 112 kg (17 st 9 lb)

Rugby union career
- Position: Prop
Senior career
Years	Team	Apps	(Points)
2003-2005	Béziers	15	(0)
2005-2007	Bourgoin	36	(5)
2007-2013	Brive	127	(20)
2013-16	Racing Métro	40	(0)
2016-17	Aviron Bayonnais	11	(0)
- Correct as of 20 December 2019
International career
Years	Team	Apps	(Points)
2003-	Georgia	38	(15)

David Khinchaguishvili (Georgian: დავით ხინჩაგიშვილი) (born 24 July 1982) is a Georgian rugby union footballer.

He previously played in the Top 14 for Aviron Bayonnais. He also previously played for CS Bourgoin-Jallieu, AS Béziers, CA Brive and Racing 92.

Khinchaguishvili is an international player for the Georgia national team, making his debut in a match against Spain in 2003. He played for Georgia in their matches in 2006 that saw them qualify for the 2007 Rugby World Cup. He also played at the 2011 Rugby World Cup.
