= Jané du Toit =

Namibia international rugby union player

- Born: Johannes Albertus du Toit; 2 October 1975 (age 51) Windhoek, South-West Africa
- Height: 6 ft 1 in (1.85 m)
- Weight: 257 lb (117 kg)

Rugby union career
- Position: Prop
International career
Years	Team	Apps	(Points)
2007–present	Namibia	16	(5)

Johannes Albertus du Toit (born 2 October 1975 in Windhoek, South-West Africa) is a Namibian rugby union loosehead prop with Plymouth Albion. He played with Namibia at the 2007 Rugby World Cup.

== Club career ==
- 1996 : Western Province U21s (South Africa)
- 1997–2000 : Stellenbosch University (South Africa)
- 2000 : Western Province (South Africa)
- 2001–2003 : Border Bulldogs (South Africa)
- 2003–2006 : Griquas (South Africa)
- 2007–2008 : Boland Cavaliers (South Africa)
- Since Sept 2008 : Plymouth Albion (England)
