= Ryan Witbooi =

Namibia international rugby union player

- Born: Ryan Carter Witbooi; 7 September 1985 (age 41) Rehoboth, Namibia
- Height: 1.91 m (6 ft 3 in)
- Weight: 87 kg (192 lb; 13.7 st)

Rugby union career
- Position: Wing
International career
Years	Team	Apps	(Points)
2004–2008	Namibia	14	(5)

Ryan Witbooi (born 7 September 1985 in Rehoboth) is a Namibian rugby union scrum half. He is a member of the Namibia national rugby union team and participated with the squad at the 2007 Rugby World Cup.He has one daughter.
