= Uakazuwaka Kazombiaze =

Namibia international rugby union player

Uamazuwaka Kazombiaze
- Born: 25 January 1979 (age 47)
- Height: 1.97 m (6 ft 6 in)
- Weight: 109 kg (17 st 2 lb)

Rugby union career
- Position: Lock
Senior career
Years	Team	Apps	(Points)
2007–present	Birmingham & Solihull R.F.C.		
International career
Years	Team	Apps	(Points)
2006–2011	Namibia	23	(5)

Uakazuwaka Kazombiaze, also known as Wakka Kazombiaze (born 25 January 1979 in Okakarara), is a Namibian rugby union player with Birmingham & Solihull R.F.C. of England's National Division Two and the Namibia national rugby union team.
