= Melrick Africa =

Namibian rugby union player

- Born: 18 January 1978 (age 48) Rehoboth, South West Africa
- Height: 1.80 m (5 ft 11 in)
- Weight: 89 kg (196 lb; 14 st 0 lb)

Rugby union career
- Position(s): Centre, Wing
Senior career
Years	Team	Apps	(Points)
- Reho Falcons
International career
Years	Team	Apps	(Points)
2003–2007	Namibia	23	(62)

Melrick John Africa (born 18 January 1978 in Rehoboth) is a Namibian rugby union centre and wing.

Africa played for Reho Falcons, in Namibia for the season of 2006/07.

He has 23 caps for Namibia, from 2003 to 2007, with 12 tries and 1 conversion scored, 62 points in aggregate. He was called for the 2003 Rugby World Cup, playing in three games, and for the 2007 Rugby World Cup, playing in all the four games. He never scored in his two presences and has been absent from the National Team since the 2007 Rugby World Cup.
