= Irakli Abuseridze =

Georgian rugby union player

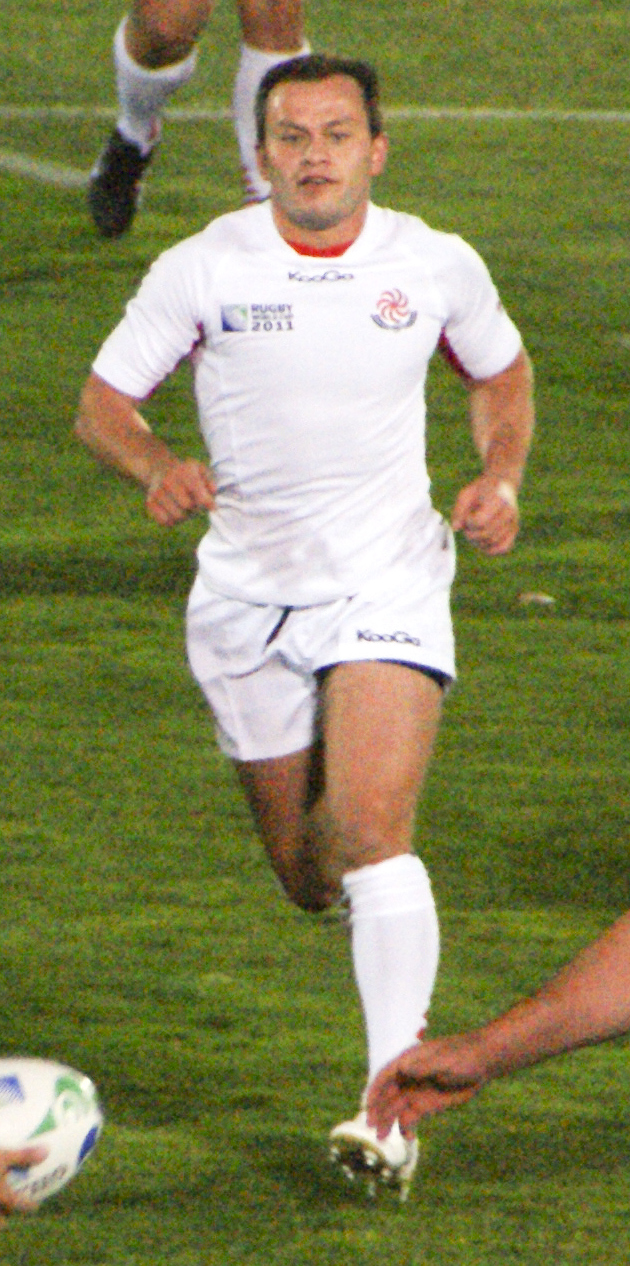
- Abuseridze in action vs Romania at 2011 Rugby World Cup
- Born: Irakli Abuseridze; November 25, 1977 (age 48) Tbilisi, Georgia
- Height: 1.74 m (5 ft 8 1/2 in)
- Weight: 70 kg (154 lb)

Rugby union career
- Position: Scrum-half
Senior career
Years	Team	Apps	(Points)
2003-2006	Aurillac		
2006-2009	Orléans		
2009-2013	Auxerre		
International career
Years	Team	Apps	(Points)
2000-2013	Georgia	85	(40)

Irakli Abuseridze (Georgian: ირაკლი აბუსერიძე, pronounced [iɾakʼli abuseɾidze]; born November 25, 1977, in Tbilisi) is a Georgian former rugby union player. He played as a scrum-half. Abuseridze is the third the most capped player of all time for the Georgia national rugby union team.

== Career ==
Abuseridze made his international debut for Georgia aged 22 against Italy XV in 2000. He has gone on to become a stalwart of the national team and played in all three of Georgia's World Cup appearances in 2003, 2007 and 2011, and has captained the side since 2008 taking over from Ilia Zedginidze.

At club level Abuseridze played with Aurillac in Pro D2 for three years between 2003 and 2006, reaching the Pro De semi finals with them in 2005. He moved down to Fédérale 1 to play for another three years with Orléans. In 2009 he again moved down a division to play in Fédérale 2 with Auxerre as a player/coach. He finished his career at the end of the 2012/13 season.

At national level Abuseridze was the first ever Georgian to reach 80 caps and held the record for most caps for Georgia with 85 before Merab Kvirikashvili superseded him. He is the third most capped player of all time outside the Tier 1 nations. He scored 8 tries, 40 points on aggregate. He was called for the 2007 Rugby World Cup and the 2011 Rugby World Cup.
