= Avto Kopaliani =

Georgia international rugby union player

- Born: June 13, 1982 (age 44)
- Height: 1.82 m (5 ft 11 1/2 in)
- Weight: 113 kg (249 lb; 17.8 st)

Rugby union career
- Position: Prop
Senior career
| Years | Team | Apps | (Points) |
- Aviron Bayonnais
| – | US Montauban | | |
International career
| Years | Team | Apps | (Points) |
| 2003-2007 | Georgia | 23 | (10) |

Avtandil "Avto" Kopaliani (Georgian: ავთანდილ კოპალიანი; born 13 June 1982) is a Georgian rugby union footballer, currently playing in the top French professional rugby league, the Top 14, for the Aviron Bayonnais club. He previously played for another French club, the US Montauban. His usual position is tighthead prop.
