= Domingo Kamonga =

Namibia international rugby union player

- Born: March 3, 1974 (age 52) Tondoro, Okavango Region
- Height: 1.9 m (6 ft 3 in)
- Weight: 101 kg (223 lb; 15.9 st)

Rugby union career
- Position: Lock
International career
Years	Team	Apps	(Points)
2004–present	Namibia	7	(0)

Domingo Kamonga (born 3 March 1974 in Tondoro, Okavango Region) is a Namibian rugby Lock with United Rugby Club and the Namibia national rugby union team. He made his international debut with Namibia in 2004.
