= Zviad Maissuradze =

Georgian rugby union player (born 1981)

Zviad Maisuradze (born Tbilisi, 28 October 1981) is a Georgian rugby union player. He plays as a flanker.

Maisuradze has 34 caps for Georgia, since 2004, with 6 tries scored, 40 points on aggregate. He was called for the 2007 Rugby World Cup, playing in three games and scoring a try. He was the only player called from the Georgia Championship, since all the others were playing abroad. He missed the 2011 Rugby World Cup but has since then returned to the "Lelos" squad.
