= Malkhaz Cheishvili =

Georgian rugby union coach

Malkhaz Cheishvili, a Georgian rugby union coach

Malkhaz Cheishvili (Georgian: მალხაზ ჭეიშვილი) (born Tbilisi, 18 October 1959) is a Georgian rugby union coach. He was the coach of Georgia at the 2007 Rugby World Cup finals.

He managed to lose by less than a try to Ireland (10-14) and achieved the first win ever of his country at the Rugby World Cup finals, with Namibia (30-0). He went on to coach the Georgia national team at the National Rugby Academy until 2008, and was the head coach of the Georgia national team at the 2007 Rugby World Cup, where he led the team to a 1-3 record. His lone World Cup win came against Namibia, a 30-0 win thanks to three tries from Akvcenti Ghiorghadze and the rest of the backs.

In 2009 he was appointed coach of the Azerbaijan rugby team. He is currently the head coach of Azerbaijan.

== Notes ==
Sporting positions
Preceded by (France) Claude Saurel	Georgia National Rugby Union Coach; 2004-2007	Succeeded by (Australia) Tim Lane
