= Malkhaz Urjukashvili =

Georgia international rugby union player

- Born: 24 September 1980 (age 46) Tbilisi, USSR
- Height: 5 ft 10 in (1.78 m)
- Weight: 176 lb (80 kg; 12.6 st)

Rugby union career
- Position: Wing
International career
Years	Team	Apps	(Points)
1997-2011	Georgia	70	(320)

Malkhaz Urjukashvili (Georgian: მალხაზ ურჯუკაშვილი, born 24 September 1980 in Tbilisi) is a Georgian former rugby union player. He played as a wing.

== Career ==
Urjukashvili moved to France, where he played for Stade Toulousain, RC Nîmes, US Tours, in 2003, Rugby Club Cannes Mandelieu, from 2003/04 to 2006/07, in the Fédérale 2, Stade Aurillacois Cantal Auvergne, from 2007/08 to 2008/09, in the Rugby Pro D2, Groupe Sportife Figeacois, from 2009/10 to 2011/12, and SC Decazeville, from 2012/13, in the Fédérale 2. He has now retired.

Urjukashvili was one of the best players and scorers for Georgia, holding 70 caps for his National Team, with 17 tries, 47 conversions, 46 penalties and 1 drop goal, in an aggregate of 320 points. His first match was a 29-15 win over Croatia, in Tbilisi, at 12 October 1997, aged only 17 years old. This made him one of the youngest players ever to be capped at international rugby level.

Urjukashvili was called up for the 2003 Rugby World Cup, playing three matches and scoring 2 penalties and 1 drop goal, 9 points in aggregate. In the game against England at Perth, he kicked a long range penalty that was Georgia's first Rugby World Cup points (England eventually won the game 84-6).

Urjukashvili was called once again for the 2007 Rugby World Cup, playing in all the four matches and scoring one conversion. He continued to be a valuable player in the 2011 Rugby World Cup qualification, the third Georgia gained in a row, playing three games and scoring 1 penalty and 1 conversion in the final stage, 5 points on aggregate. He has been absent from his national team since then.
