= Paliko Jimsheladze =

Georgian rugby union player

Paliko Jimsheladze (Georgian: პალიკო ჯიმშელაძე; born 8 July 1975 in Rustavi, Georgia) is a former Georgian rugby union player. He played as a fly-half.

He twice won the Georgia Championship, for Tbilissi Tbilisi, in 1994, and for Gumari Tbilisi, in 1996. He moved to France, where he played for Castres (1998–2000), Grenoble (2000–01) Stade Aurillacois (2001–04), AC Bobigny (2004–06) and Arras (2006–07). He began playing for SO Chambéry in 2007.

Jimsheladze had 57 caps for the Georgia national rugby union team from 1995 to 2007, scoring 9 tries, 61 conversions, 48 penalties and 3 drop goals, 320 points in aggregate. He is the national top scorer for Georgia.

Jimsheladze was selected to play for Georgia during the 2003 Rugby World Cup, playing in four games, where he scored 1 conversion, 6 penalties and 1 drop goal, 23 points in aggregate, and at the 2007 Rugby World Cup, playing in a single game, this time being scoreless.
