= 2007 Rugby World Cup Pool C =

Pool C of the 2007 Rugby World Cup began on 8 September and concluded on 29 September 2007. The pool was composed of Italy, New Zealand, Romania and Scotland and World Cup debutants Portugal.

== Standings ==
New Zealand were assured of first place in the pool after only three rounds of matches, having secured the maximum of five points from each of their matches. Over their four matches, the All Blacks established a new points record for the pool stage with 309 points.

Italy were unable to carry their strong Six Nations form into the World Cup, and were knocked out by a narrow margin. Scotland qualified for the quarter-finals as pool runners-up.

Pos	Team	Pld	W	D	L	PF	PA	PD	B	Pts	Qualification
1	New Zealand	4	4	0	0	309	35	+274	4	20	Qualified for the quarter-finals
2	Scotland	4	3	0	1	116	66	+50	2	14	Qualified for the quarter-finals
3	Italy	4	2	0	2	85	117	−32	1	9	Eliminated, automatic qualification for RWC 2011
4	Romania	4	1	0	3	40	161	−121	1	5	
5	Portugal	4	0	0	4	38	209	−171	1	1	

== Matches ==
All times local (UTC+2)

=== New Zealand vs Italy ===
8 September 2007
13:45

New Zealand	76–14	Italy
Try: McCaw (2) 2' c, 7' c Howlett (3) 12' c, 56' c, 59' m Muliaina 15' c Sivivatu (2) 18' c, 29' m Jack 50' c Collins (2) 68' c, 70' c Con: Carter (7/9); McAlister (2/2); Pen: Carter (1/1) 11'	Report	Try: Stanojevic 38' c Mi. Bergamasco 71' c Con: Bortolussi (1/1); De Marigny (1/1)

Stade Vélodrome, Marseille
Attendance: 58,612
Referee: Wayne Barnes (England)

FB	15	Leon MacDonald
RW	14	Doug Howlett
OC	13	Mils Muliaina		(substituted off) 53'
IC	12	Luke McAlister
LW	11	Sitiveni Sivivatu
FH	10	Dan Carter		(substituted off) 60'
SH	9	Byron Kelleher		(substituted off) 52'
N8	8	Rodney So'oialo
OF	7	Richie McCaw (c)		(substituted off) 60'
BF	6	Jerry Collins		(substituted off) 46'	(substituted on) 46'
RL	5	Ali Williams		(substituted off) 71'
LL	4	Chris Jack
TP	3	Carl Hayman	(yellow card) 42'
HK	2	Keven Mealamu		(substituted off) 52'
LP	1	Tony Woodcock				(substituted off) 55'
Replacements:
HK	16	Anton Oliver		(substituted on) 52'
PR	17	Neemia Tialata		(substituted on) 46'	(substituted off) 46'	(substituted on) 55'
FL	18	Chris Masoe		(substituted on) 60'
N8	19	Sione Lauaki		(substituted on) 71'
SH	20	Brendon Leonard		(substituted on) 52'
CE	21	Aaron Mauger		(substituted on) 60'
CE	22	Isaia Toeava		(substituted on) 53'
Coach:
(New Zealand) Graham Henry

FB	15	David Bortolussi		(substituted off) 67'
RW	14	Kaine Robertson
OC	13	Andrea Masi
IC	12	Mirco Bergamasco
LW	11	Marko Stanojevic
FH	10	Roland de Marigny
SH	9	Alessandro Troncon		(substituted off) 67'
N8	8	Sergio Parisse
OF	7	Mauro Bergamasco
BF	6	Alessandro Zanni		(substituted off) 42'
RL	5	Marco Bortolami (c)
LL	4	Santiago Dellapè		(substituted off) 58'
TP	3	Martin Castrogiovanni			(substituted off) 55'
HK	2	Fabio Ongaro		(substituted off) 57'
LP	1	Salvatore Perugini	(yellow card) 62'	(substituted off) 41'	(substituted on) 55'
Replacements:
HK	16	Carlo Festuccia		(substituted on) 57'
PR	17	Andrea Lo Cicero		(substituted on) 41'
LK	18	Valerio Bernabò		(substituted on) 58'
N8	19	Manoa Vosawai		(substituted on) 42'
SH	20	Paul Griffen		(substituted on) 67'
WG	21	Gonzalo Canale
FB	22	Ezio Galon		(substituted on) 67'
Coach:
(France) Pierre Berbizier

Man of the Match:
Richie McCaw (New Zealand)

Touch judges:
Mark Lawrence (South Africa)
Christophe Berdos (France)
Television match official:
Craig Joubert (South Africa)
Fourth official:
Nigel Owens (Wales)
Fifth official:
Franck Maciello (France)

Note: Doug Howlett's three tries in this match brought him level with Christian Cullen as New Zealand's all-time highest try scorer, with 46.

=== Scotland vs Portugal ===
9 September 2007
18:00

Scotland	56–10	Portugal
Try: R. Lamont (2) 12' c, 14' c S. Lawson 23' c Dewey 30' c Parks 57' c Southwell 60' c Brown 68' c Ford 76' c Con: Parks (5/5); Paterson (3/3)	Report	Try: Carvalho 28' c Con: D. Pinto (1/1); Pen: D. Pinto (1/1) 34'

Stade Geoffroy-Guichard, Saint-Étienne
Attendance: 34,162
Referee: Steve Walsh (New Zealand)

FB	15	Rory Lamont
RW	14	Sean Lamont
OC	13	Marcus Di Rollo	(substituted off) 52'
IC	12	Rob Dewey
LW	11	Simon Webster
FH	10	Dan Parks	(substituted off) 59'
SH	9	Mike Blair	(substituted off) 67'
N8	8	Simon Taylor
OF	7	Ally Hogg
BF	6	Jason White (c)	(substituted off) 62'
RL	5	Scott Murray	(substituted off) 62'
LL	4	Nathan Hines
TP	3	Euan Murray
HK	2	Scott Lawson	(substituted off) 69'
LP	1	Allan Jacobsen	(substituted off) 36'
Replacements:
HK	16	Ross Ford	(substituted on) 69'
PR	17	Gavin Kerr	(substituted on) 36'
LK	18	Scott MacLeod	(substituted on) 62'
FL	19	Kelly Brown	(substituted on) 62'
SH	20	Rory Lawson	(substituted on) 67'
FH	21	Chris Paterson	(substituted on) 59'
FB	22	Hugo Southwell	(substituted on) 52'
Coach:
(Scotland) Frank Hadden

FB	15	Pedro Leal
RW	14	David Mateus
OC	13	Frederico Sousa		(substituted off) 38'
IC	12	Diogo Mateus
LW	11	Pedro Carvalho
FH	10	Duarte Cardoso Pinto		(substituted off) 64'
SH	9	José Pinto		(substituted off) 66'
N8	8	Vasco Uva (c)
OF	7	João Uva	(yellow card) 40+'	(substituted off) 64'
BF	6	Juan Severino Somoza
RL	5	David Penalva		(substituted off) 52'
LL	4	Gonçalo Uva
TP	3	Ruben Spachuck
HK	2	Joaquim Ferreira		(substituted off) 52'
LP	1	Rui Cordeiro		(substituted off) 60'
Replacements:
PR	16	Juan Muré		(substituted on) 60'
HK	17	João Correia		(substituted on) 52'
FL	18	Paulo Murinello		(substituted on) 52'
FL	19	Diogo Coutinho		(substituted on) 64'
SH	20	Luís Pissarra		(substituted on) 66'
FH	21	Pedro Cabral		(substituted on) 64'
CE	22	Miguel Portela		(substituted on) 38'
Coach:
(Portugal) Tomaz Morais

Man of the Match:
Vasco Uva (Portugal)

Touch judges:
Hugh Watkins (Wales)
Marius Jonker (South Africa)
Television match official:
Dave Pearson (England)
Fourth official:
Alan Lewis (Ireland)
Fifth official:
Cyril Lafon (France)

=== Italy vs Romania ===
12 September 2007
20:00

Italy	24–18	Romania
Try: Dellapè 6' m Penalty try 55' c Con: Pez (1/1); Pen: Bortolussi (1/2) 14'; Ramiro Pez (3/3) 62', 66', 72'	Report	Try: Manta 43' m Țincu 47' c Con: Dimofte (1/1); Pen: Dimofte (2/2) 70', 74'

Stade Vélodrome, Marseille
Attendance: 44,241
Referee: Tony Spreadbury (England)

FB	15	David Bortolussi			(substituted off) 49'
RW	14	Kaine Robertson
OC	13	Gonzalo Canale
IC	12	Mirco Bergamasco
LW	11	Andrea Masi	(substituted off) 42'	(substituted on) 45'
FH	10	Ramiro Pez
SH	9	Paul Griffen	(substituted off) 49'
N8	8	Sergio Parisse
OF	7	Mauro Bergamasco
BF	6	Josh Sole	(substituted off) 49'
RL	5	Marco Bortolami (c)
LL	4	Santiago Dellapè	(substituted off) 8'
TP	3	Martin Castrogiovanni
HK	2	Carlo Festuccia
LP	1	Andrea Lo Cicero
Replacements:
HK	16	Leonardo Ghiraldini
PR	17	Matías Agüero
LK	18	Valerio Bernabò	(substituted on) 8'
N8	19	Manoa Vosawai	(substituted on) 49'
SH	20	Alessandro Troncon	(substituted on) 49'
WG	21	Ezio Galon	(substituted on) 42'	(substituted off) 45'	(substituted on) 49'
FH	22	Roland de Marigny
Coach:
(France) Pierre Berbizier

FB	15	Iulian Dumitraș		(substituted off) 79'
RW	14	Cătălin Fercu
OC	13	Csaba Gál
IC	12	Romeo Gontineac
LW	11	Gabriel Brezoianu
FH	10	Ionuț Dimofte
SH	9	Lucian Sîrbu		(substituted off) 80'
N8	8	Ovidiu Tonița		(substituted off) 72'
OF	7	Alexandru Manta	(yellow card) 53'	(substituted off) 80+'
BF	6	Florin Corodeanu
RL	5	Cristian Petre
LL	4	Sorin Socol (c)
TP	3	Bogdan Bălan
HK	2	Marius Țincu		(substituted off) 40'	(substituted on) 41'	(substituted off) 54'	(substituted on) 57'	(substituted off) 70'
LP	1	Petrișor Toderașc		(substituted off) 64'
Replacements:
HK	16	Răzvan Mavrodin		(substituted on) 40'	(substituted off) 41'	(substituted on) 54'	(substituted off) 57'	(substituted on) 70'
PR	17	Cezar Popescu		(substituted on) 64'
LK	18	Cosmin Rațiu		(substituted on) 72'
N8	19	Alexandru Tudori		(substituted on) 80+'
SH	20	Valentin Calafeteanu		(substituted on) 80'
CE	21	Ionuț Tofan
CE	22	Dan Vlad		(substituted on) 79'
Coach:
(France) Daniel Santamans

Man of the Match:
Ramiro Pez (Italy)

Touch judges:
Kelvin Deaker (New Zealand)
Bryce Lawrence (New Zealand)
Television match official:
Lyndon Bray (New Zealand)
Fourth official:
Alain Rolland (Ireland)
Fifth official:
Franck Maciello (France)

=== New Zealand vs Portugal ===
15 September 2007
13:00

New Zealand	108–13	Portugal
Try: Rokocoko (2) 3' m, 12' c Toeava 25' c Williams 28' c Mauger (2) 30' c, 66' c Collins 32' c Masoe 34' m Hore 40' c Leonard 50' c Evans 59' c Ellis 61' c MacDonald 69' c Smith (2) 72' c, 79' c Hayman 76' c Con: Evans (14/16)	Report	Try: Cordeiro 48' c Con: D. Pinto (1/1); Pen: D. Pinto (1/1) 75'; Drop: Malheiro (1/2) 22'

Stade de Gerland, Lyon
Attendance: 40,729
Referee: Chris White (England)

FB	15	Mils Muliaina	(substituted off) 7'
RW	14	Isaia Toeava
OC	13	Conrad Smith
IC	12	Aaron Mauger
LW	11	Joe Rokocoko
FH	10	Nick Evans
SH	9	Brendon Leonard	(substituted off) 54'
N8	8	Sione Lauaki
OF	7	Chris Masoe
BF	6	Jerry Collins (c)	(substituted off) 64'
RL	5	Ali Williams	(substituted off) 54'
LL	4	Chris Jack	(substituted off) 51'
TP	3	Greg Somerville	(substituted off) 61'
HK	2	Andrew Hore	(substituted off) 57'
LP	1	Neemia Tialata
Replacements:
HK	16	Anton Oliver	(substituted on) 57'
PR	17	Tony Woodcock	(substituted on) 61'
PR	18	Carl Hayman	(substituted on) 51'
N8	19	Rodney So'oialo	(substituted on) 54'
HK	20	Keven Mealamu	(substituted on) 64'
SH	21	Andy Ellis	(substituted on) 54'
FB	22	Leon MacDonald	(substituted on) 7'
Coach:
(New Zealand) Graham Henry

FB	15	Pedro Leal
RW	14	António Aguilar
OC	13	Miguel Portela
IC	12	Diogo Mateus
LW	11	Pedro Carvalho
FH	10	Gonçalo Malheiro	(substituted off) 41'
SH	9	Luís Pissarra	(substituted off) 41'
N8	8	Vasco Uva (c)	(substituted off) 54'
OF	7	Paulo Murinello
BF	6	Diogo Coutinho	(substituted off) 44'
RL	5	Gonçalo Uva	(substituted off) 51'
LL	4	Marcello d'Orey	(substituted off) 27'
TP	3	Ruben Spachuck
HK	2	João Correia
LP	1	André Silva	(substituted off) 41'
Replacements:
PR	16	Rui Cordeiro	(substituted on) 41'
PR	17	Joaquim Ferreira	(substituted on) 54'
LK	18	David Penalva	(substituted on) 27'
FL	19	Tiago Girão	(substituted on) 44'
FL	20	João Uva	(substituted on) 51'
SH	21	José Pinto	(substituted on) 41'
FH	22	Duarte Cardoso Pinto	(substituted on) 41'
Coach:
(Portugal) Tomaz Morais

Man of the Match:
Jerry Collins (New Zealand)

Touch judges:
Hugh Watkins (Wales)
Marius Jonker (South Africa)
Television match official:
Dave Pearson (England)
Fourth official:
Paul Honiss (New Zealand)
Fifth official:
Laurent Valin (France)

=== Scotland vs Romania ===
18 September 2007
21:00

Scotland	42–0	Romania
Try: Paterson 2' c Hogg (3) 17' c, 46' c, 53' c R. Lamont (2) 36' c, 72' c Con: Paterson (6/6)	Report

Murrayfield Stadium, Edinburgh
Attendance: 31,222
Referee: Nigel Owens (Wales)

FB	15	Rory Lamont
RW	14	Sean Lamont
OC	13	Simon Webster
IC	12	Rob Dewey	(substituted off) 59'
LW	11	Chris Paterson
FH	10	Dan Parks	(substituted off) 68'
SH	9	Mike Blair	(substituted off) 59'
N8	8	Simon Taylor
OF	7	Ally Hogg	(substituted off) 65'
BF	6	Jason White (c)
RL	5	Jim Hamilton
LL	4	Nathan Hines	(substituted off) 52'
TP	3	Euan Murray		(substituted off) 68'
HK	2	Ross Ford	(substituted off) 59'
LP	1	Gavin Kerr	(substituted off) 52'	(substituted on) 68'
Replacements:
HK	16	Scott Lawson	(substituted on) 59'
PR	17	Craig Smith	(substituted on) 52'
LK	18	Scott MacLeod	(substituted on) 52'
FL	19	Kelly Brown	(substituted on) 65'
SH	20	Chris Cusiter	(substituted on) 59'
FB	21	Hugo Southwell	(substituted on) 59'
WG	22	Nikki Walker	(substituted on) 68'
Coach:
(Scotland) Frank Hadden

FB	15	Iulian Dumitraș
RW	14	Cătălin Fercu
OC	13	Csaba Gál
IC	12	Romeo Gontineac	(substituted off) 73'
LW	11	Gabriel Brezoianu
FH	10	Ionuț Dimofte	(substituted off) 45'
SH	9	Lucian Sîrbu	(substituted off) 45'
N8	8	Ovidiu Tonița
OF	7	Alexandru Manta	(substituted off) 53'
BF	6	Florin Corodeanu	(substituted off) 61'
RL	5	Cristian Petre
LL	4	Sorin Socol (c)
TP	3	Bogdan Bălan	(substituted off) 69'
HK	2	Marius Țincu	(substituted off) 41'
LP	1	Petrișor Toderașc
Replacements:
PR	16	Silviu Florea	(substituted on) 69'
HK	17	Răzvan Mavrodin	(substituted on) 41'
LK	18	Cosmin Rațiu	(substituted on) 61'
N8	19	Alexandru Tudori	(substituted on) 53'
SH	20	Valentin Calafeteanu	(substituted on) 45'
CE	21	Ionuț Tofan	(substituted on) 45'
FB	22	Florin Vlaicu	(substituted on) 73'
Coach:
(France) Daniel Santamans

Man of the Match:
Ally Hogg (Scotland)

Touch judges:
Craig Joubert (South Africa)
Christophe Berdos (France)
Television match official:
Mark Lawrence (South Africa)
Fourth official:
Wayne Barnes (England)
Fifth official:
Peter Allan (Scotland)

Note: With an attendance of 31,222, Scotland vs Romania was the lowest-attended match in Pool C, despite Scotland playing at home.

=== Italy vs Portugal ===
19 September 2007
20:00

Italy	31–5	Portugal
Try: Masi (2) 4' c, 77' c Ma. Bergamasco 72' m Con: Bortolussi (2/3); Pen: Bortolussi (4/4) 17', 30', 40+', 63'	Report	Try: Penalva 33' m

Parc des Princes, Paris
Attendance: 45,476
Referee: Marius Jonker (South Africa)

FB	15	David Bortolussi
RW	14	Pablo Canavosio
OC	13	Gonzalo Canale
IC	12	Andrea Masi
LW	11	Matteo Pratichetti
FH	10	Roland de Marigny
SH	9	Alessandro Troncon		(substituted off) 80'
N8	8	Manoa Vosawai		(substituted off) 59'
OF	7	Mauro Bergamasco
BF	6	Sergio Parisse
RL	5	Marco Bortolami (c)	(yellow card) 8'
LL	4	Carlo Del Fava
TP	3	Martin Castrogiovanni		(substituted off) 64'
HK	2	Leonardo Ghiraldini
LP	1	Andrea Lo Cicero		(substituted off) 64'
Replacements:
HK	16	Fabio Ongaro
PR	17	Matías Agüero		(substituted on) 64'
PR	18	Salvatore Perugini		(substituted on) 64'
LK	19	Valerio Bernabò
FL	20	Silvio Orlando		(substituted on) 59'
SH	21	Paul Griffen		(substituted on) 80'
WG	22	Ezio Galon
Coach:
(France) Pierre Berbizier

FB	15	Pedro Cabral
RW	14	David Mateus	(substituted off) 61'
OC	13	Federico Sousa
IC	12	Diogo Mateus	(substituted off) 31'
LW	11	António Aguilar
FH	10	Duarte Cardoso Pinto
SH	9	José Pinto	(substituted off) 66'
N8	8	Vasco Uva (c)
OF	7	João Uva	(substituted off) 64'
BF	6	Tiago Girão
RL	5	David Penalva
LL	4	Gonçalo Uva
TP	3	Ruben Spachuck	(substituted off) 61'
HK	2	João Correia	(substituted off) 70'
LP	1	Rui Cordeiro	(substituted off) 61'
Replacements:
PR	16	Juan Muré	(substituted on) 61'
PR	17	André Silva	(substituted on) 61'
PR	18	Duarte Figueiredo	(substituted on) 70'
FL	19	Paulo Murinello	(substituted on) 64'
SH	20	Luís Pissarra	(substituted on) 66'
CE	21	Diogo Gama	(substituted on) 31'
WG	22	Gonçalo Foro	(substituted on) 61'
Coach:
(Portugal) Tomaz Morais

Man of the Match:
José Pinto (Portugal)

Touch judges:
Federico Cuesta (Argentina)
Malcolm Changleng (Scotland)
Television match official:
Paul Marks (Australia)
Fourth official:
Chris White (England)
Fifth official:
Eric Molier (France)

=== Scotland vs New Zealand ===
23 September 2007
17:00

Scotland	0–40	New Zealand
	Report	Try: McCaw 5' c Howlett (2) 15' m, 74' m Kelleher 33' m Williams 62' m Carter 65' c Con: Carter (2/6); Pen: Carter (2/3) 26', 43'

Murrayfield Stadium, Edinburgh
Attendance: 64,558
Referee: Marius Jonker (South Africa)

FB	15	Hugo Southwell
RW	14	Nikki Walker
OC	13	Marcus Di Rollo
IC	12	Andrew Henderson	(substituted off) 69'
LW	11	Simon Webster
FH	10	Chris Paterson	(substituted off) 21'
SH	9	Chris Cusiter	(substituted off) 59'
N8	8	David Callam
OF	7	John Barclay
BF	6	Kelly Brown
RL	5	Scott Murray (c)
LL	4	Scott MacLeod	(substituted off) 69'
TP	3	Craig Smith	(substituted off) 51'	(substituted on) 66'
HK	2	Scott Lawson	(substituted off) 58'
LP	1	Alasdair Dickinson		(substituted off) 66'
Replacements:
HK	16	Fergus Thomson	(substituted on) 58'
PR	17	Gavin Kerr	(substituted on) 51'
LK	18	Jim Hamilton	(substituted on) 69'
FL	19	Ally Hogg
SH	20	Rory Lawson	(substituted on) 59'
FH	21	Dan Parks	(substituted on) 21'
CE	22	Rob Dewey	(substituted on) 69'
Coach:
(Scotland) Frank Hadden

FB	15	Leon MacDonald	(substituted off) 21'
RW	14	Doug Howlett
OC	13	Conrad Smith	(substituted off) 65'
IC	12	Luke McAlister
LW	11	Sitiveni Sivivatu
FH	10	Dan Carter
SH	9	Byron Kelleher	(substituted off) 59'
N8	8	Rodney So'oialo
OF	7	Richie McCaw (c)	(substituted off) 61'
BF	6	Chris Masoe
RL	5	Ali Williams	(substituted off) 66'
LL	4	Reuben Thorne
TP	3	Carl Hayman	(substituted off) 65'
HK	2	Anton Oliver	(substituted off) 59'
LP	1	Tony Woodcock
Replacements:
HK	16	Andrew Hore	(substituted on) 59'
PR	17	Neemia Tialata	(substituted on) 65'
LK	18	Chris Jack	(substituted on) 66'
N8	19	Sione Lauaki	(substituted on) 61'
SH	20	Brendon Leonard	(substituted on) 59'
FH	21	Nick Evans	(substituted on) 21'
CE	22	Isaia Toeava	(substituted on) 65'
Coach:
(New Zealand) Graham Henry

Man of the Match:
Chris Masoe (New Zealand)

Touch judges:
Dave Pearson (England)
Paul Marks (Australia)
Television match official:
Hugh Watkins (Wales)
Fourth official:
Chris White (England)
Fifth official:
Peter Allan (Scotland)

Note: Doug Howlett's two tries in this match brought his total in internationals to 48, a new try-scoring record for New Zealand.

=== Romania vs Portugal ===
25 September 2007
20:00

Romania	14–10	Portugal
Try: Țincu 63' c Corodeanu 72' c Con: Calafeteanu (1/1); Dumbravă (1/1)	Report	Try: Ferreira 18' c Con: D. Pinto (1/1); Pen: Malheiro (1/1) 69'

Stadium de Toulouse, Toulouse
Attendance: 35,526
Referee: Paul Honiss (New Zealand)

FB	15	Iulian Dumitraș
RW	14	Cătălin Nicolae
OC	13	Ionuț Dimofte
IC	12	Romeo Gontineac
LW	11	Cătălin Fercu
FH	10	Dănuț Dumbravă
SH	9	Valentin Calafeteanu	(substituted off) 64'
N8	8	Ovidiu Tonița (c)	(substituted off) 66'
OF	7	Florin Corodeanu
BF	6	Alexandru Tudori	(substituted off) 41'
RL	5	Cristian Petre
LL	4	Cosmin Rațiu
TP	3	Bogdan Bălan	(substituted off) 52'	(substituted on) 63'
HK	2	Răzvan Mavrodin	(substituted off) 41'
LP	1	Cezar Popescu		(substituted off) 63'
Replacements:
HK	16	Marius Țincu	(substituted on) 41'
PR	17	Paulică Ion	(substituted on) 52'
LK	18	Sorin Socol	(substituted on) 41'
LK	19	Valentin Ursache	(substituted on) 66'
SH	20	Lucian Sîrbu	(substituted on) 64'
FB	21	Florin Vlaicu
WG	22	Gabriel Brezoianu
Coach:
(France) Daniel Santamans

FB	15	Pedro Leal
RW	14	António Aguilar
OC	13	Miguel Portela
IC	12	Federico Sousa
LW	11	Pedro Carvalho
FH	10	Duarte Cardoso Pinto	(substituted off) 65'
SH	9	José Pinto	(substituted off) 75'
N8	8	Tiago Girão
OF	7	João Uva	(substituted off) 76'
BF	6	Diogo Coutinho
RL	5	David Penalva	(substituted off) 79'
LL	4	Gonçalo Uva
TP	3	Ruben Spachuck	(substituted off) 52'
HK	2	Joaquim Ferreira (c)	(substituted off) 70'
LP	1	Rui Cordeiro
Replacements:
PR	16	Juan Muré	(substituted on) 70'
PR	17	João Correia	(substituted on) 52'
PR	18	Salvador Palha	(substituted on) 79'
FL	19	Paulo Murinello	(substituted on) 76'
SH	20	Luís Pissarra	(substituted on) 75'
FH	21	Gonçalo Malheiro	(substituted on) 65'
CE	22	Diogo Gama
Coach:
(Portugal) Tomaz Morais

Man of the Match:
Diogo Coutinho (Portugal)

Touch judges:
Carlo Damasco (Italy)
Simon McDowell (Ireland)
Television match official:
Kelvin Deaker (New Zealand)
Fourth official:
Stuart Dickinson (Australia)
Fifth official:
Jean-Luc Rebollal (France)

=== New Zealand vs Romania ===
29 September 2007
13:00

New Zealand	85–8	Romania
Try: Sivivatu (2) 1' m, 24' c Masoe 10' c Rokocoko (3) 15' c, 58' c, 66' c Evans 18' m Mauger 37' m Toeava (2) 47' c, 80+' c Hore 64' c Smith 75' c Howlett 79' c Con: McAlister (4/7); Evans (6/6)	Report	Try: Țincu 31' m Pen: Vlaicu 72'

Stadium de Toulouse, Toulouse
Attendance: 35,608
Referee: Joël Jutge (France)

FB	15	Nick Evans
RW	14	Joe Rokocoko
OC	13	Isaia Toeava
IC	12	Aaron Mauger
LW	11	Sitiveni Sivivatu	(substituted off) 61'
FH	10	Luke McAlister	(substituted off) 55'
SH	9	Andy Ellis	(substituted off) 59'
N8	8	Sione Lauaki
OF	7	Chris Masoe	(substituted off) 55'
BF	6	Jerry Collins (c)
RL	5	Keith Robinson	(substituted off) 55'
LL	4	Reuben Thorne
TP	3	Greg Somerville
HK	2	Keven Mealamu	(substituted off) 61'
LP	1	Neemia Tialata
Replacements:
HK	16	Andrew Hore	(substituted on) 61'
PR	17	Tony Woodcock
LK	18	Chris Jack	(substituted on) 55'
FL	19	Richie McCaw	(substituted on) 55'
SH	20	Brendon Leonard	(substituted on) 59'
WG	21	Doug Howlett	(substituted on) 55'
CE	22	Conrad Smith	(substituted on) 61'
Coach:
(New Zealand) Graham Henry

FB	15	Iulian Dumitraș	(substituted off) 61'
RW	14	Ștefan Ciuntu
OC	13	Csaba Gál
IC	12	Romeo Gontineac	(substituted off) 70'
LW	11	Gabriel Brezoianu
FH	10	Ionuț Dimofte
SH	9	Lucian Sîrbu	(substituted off) 62'
N8	8	Ovidiu Tonița
OF	7	Alexandru Manta	(substituted off) 67'
BF	6	Florin Corodeanu	(substituted off) 48'
RL	5	Cristian Petre
LL	4	Sorin Socol (c)
TP	3	Silviu Florea	(substituted off) 53'	(substituted on) 57'
HK	2	Marius Țincu	(substituted off) 53'
LP	1	Bogdan Bălan		(substituted off) 57'
Replacements:
HK	16	Răzvan Mavrodin	(substituted on) 53'
PR	17	Paulică Ion	(substituted on) 53'
LK	18	Valentin Ursache	(substituted on) 67'
N8	19	Cosmin Rațiu	(substituted on) 48'
SH	20	Valentin Calafeteanu	(substituted on) 62'
FB	21	Florin Vlaicu	(substituted on) 61'
CE	22	Robert Cătălin Dascălu	(substituted on) 70'
Coach:
(France) Daniel Santamans

Man of the Match:
Joe Rokocoko (New Zealand)

Touch judges:
Federico Cuesta (Argentina)
Malcolm Changleng (Scotland)
Television match official:
Paul Marks (Australia)
Fourth official:
Romain Poite (France)
Fifth official:
Jean-Luc Rebollal (France)

=== Scotland vs Italy ===
29 September 2007
21:00

Scotland	18–16	Italy
Pen: Paterson (6/6) 2', 6', 32', 35', 47', 53'	Report	Try: Troncon 13' c Con: Bortolussi (1/1); Pen: Bortolussi (3/6) 18', 56', 62'

Stade Geoffroy-Guichard, Saint-Étienne
Attendance: 34,701
Referee: Jonathan Kaplan (South Africa)

FB	15	Rory Lamont		(substituted off) 25'
RW	14	Sean Lamont
OC	13	Simon Webster
IC	12	Rob Dewey		(substituted off) 60'
LW	11	Chris Paterson
FH	10	Dan Parks
SH	9	Mike Blair		(substituted off) 72'
N8	8	Simon Taylor
OF	7	Ally Hogg		(substituted off) 70'
BF	6	Jason White (c)
RL	5	Jim Hamilton		(substituted off) 72'
LL	4	Nathan Hines	(yellow card) 55'
TP	3	Euan Murray
HK	2	Ross Ford
LP	1	Gavin Kerr		(substituted off) 65'
Replacements:
HK	16	Scott Lawson
PR	17	Craig Smith		(substituted on) 65'
LK	18	Scott MacLeod		(substituted on) 72'
FL	19	Kelly Brown		(substituted on) 70'
SH	20	Chris Cusiter		(substituted on) 72'
CE	21	Andrew Henderson		(substituted on) 60'
FB	22	Hugo Southwell		(substituted on) 25'
Coach:
(Scotland) Frank Hadden

FB	15	David Bortolussi
RW	14	Kaine Robertson
OC	13	Gonzalo Canale
IC	12	Mirco Bergamasco
LW	11	Andrea Masi		(substituted off) 79'
FH	10	Ramiro Pez
SH	9	Alessandro Troncon (c)
N8	8	Sergio Parisse
OF	7	Mauro Bergamasco	(yellow card) 8'
BF	6	Josh Sole
RL	5	Carlo Del Fava
LL	4	Santiago Dellapè
TP	3	Martin Castrogiovanni			(substituted off) 75'
HK	2	Carlo Festuccia		(substituted off) 54'
LP	1	Salvatore Perugini		(substituted off) 49'	(substituted on) 75'
Replacements:
HK	16	Fabio Ongaro		(substituted on) 54'
PR	17	Andrea Lo Cicero		(substituted on) 49'
LK	18	Valerio Bernabò
HK	19	Leonardo Ghiraldini
SH	20	Paul Griffen
FH	21	Roland de Marigny
WG	22	Ezio Galon		(substituted on) 79'
Coach:
(France) Pierre Berbizier

Man of the Match:
Dan Parks (Scotland)

Touch judges:
Hugh Watkins (Wales)
Wayne Barnes (England)
Television match official:
Dave Pearson (England)
Fourth official:
Cyril Lafon (France)
Fifth official:
Laurent Valin (France)
