= Portugal at the Rugby World Cup =

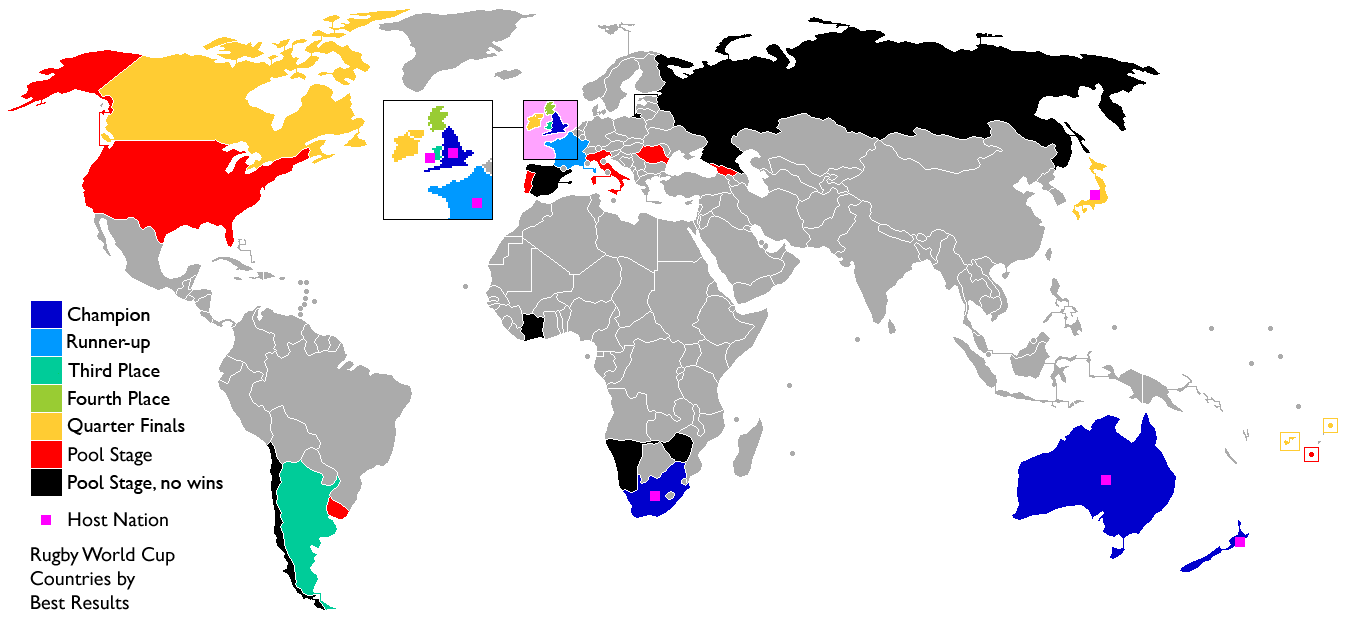
Map of nations best results, excluding nations which unsuccessfully participated in qualifying tournaments.

Portugal has appeared at the Rugby World Cup twice, in 2007 and 2023.

At the 2007 Rugby World Cup the team lost all four matches but succeeded in scoring points and one try in every match, and was able to gain a bonus point on the final game against Romania.

At the 2023 Rugby World Cup the team achieved its first draw against Georgia and also its first ever win beating Fiji 24 points to 23.

Portugal has never made it past the pool stage of the tournament.

== By position ==
Rugby World Cup record										Qualification						
Year	Round	Pld	W	D	L	PF	PA	Squad	Head coach	Pos	Pld	W	D	L	PF	PA
(New Zealand) (Australia) 1987	Not invited									Not invited						
(England) (France) (Ireland) (Scotland) (Wales) 1991	Did not qualify									P/O	2	1	0	1	18	45
(South Africa) 1995	Did not qualify									3rd	5	2	0	3	85	177
(Wales) 1999	Did not qualify									P/O	8	3	0	5	181	245
(Australia) 2003	Did not qualify									2nd	2	1	0	1	60	60
(France) 2007	Pool Stage	4	0	0	4	38	209	Squad	T. Morais	P/O	18	10	2	6	283	360
(New Zealand) 2011	Did not qualify									4th	10	5	1	4	255	149
(England) 2015	Did not qualify									2nd	10	2	1	7	145	222
(Japan) 2019	Did not qualify									P/O	7	6	0	1	237	65
(France) 2023	Pool Stage	4	1	1	2	64	103	Squad	P. Lagisquet	P/O	13	7	2	4	478	267
(Australia) 2027	Qualified									1st	3	3	0	0	130	50
(United States) 2031	To be determined									To be determined						
Total	—	8	1	1	6	102	312	—	—	—	78	40	6	32	1872	1640
Champions; Runners–up; Third place; Fourth place; Home venue

== Matches ==
=== 2007 Rugby World Cup ===
Pos	Team	Pld	W	D	L	PF	PA	PD	B	Pts	Qualification
1	New Zealand	4	4	0	0	309	35	+274	4	20	Qualified for the quarter-finals
2	Scotland	4	3	0	1	116	66	+50	2	14	Qualified for the quarter-finals
3	Italy	4	2	0	2	85	117	−32	1	9	Eliminated, automatic qualification for RWC 2011
4	Romania	4	1	0	3	40	161	−121	1	5	
5	Portugal	4	0	0	4	38	209	−171	1	1	

9 September 2007
18:00

Scotland	56–10	Portugal
Try: R. Lamont (2) 12' c, 14' c S. Lawson 23' c Dewey 30' c Parks 57' c Southwell 60' c Brown 68' c Ford 76' c Con: Parks (5/5); Paterson (3/3)	Report	Try: Carvalho 28' c Con: D. Pinto (1/1); Pen: D. Pinto (1/1) 34'

Stade Geoffroy-Guichard, Saint-Étienne
Attendance: 34,162
Referee: Steve Walsh (New Zealand)

15 September 2007
13:00

New Zealand	108–13	Portugal
Try: Rokocoko (2) 3' m, 12' c Toeava 25' c Williams 28' c Mauger (2) 30' c, 66' c Collins 32' c Masoe 34' m Hore 40' c Leonard 50' c Evans 59' c Ellis 61' c MacDonald 69' c Smith (2) 72' c, 79' c Hayman 76' c Con: Evans (14/16)	Report	Try: Cordeiro 48' c Con: D. Pinto (1/1); Pen: D. Pinto (1/1) 75'; Drop: Malheiro (1/2) 22'

Stade de Gerland, Lyon
Attendance: 40,729
Referee: Chris White (England)

19 September 2007
20:00

Italy	31–5	Portugal
Try: Masi (2) 4' c, 77' c Ma. Bergamasco 72' m Con: Bortolussi (2/3); Pen: Bortolussi (4/4) 17', 30', 40+', 63'	Report	Try: Penalva 33' m

Parc des Princes, Paris
Attendance: 45,476
Referee: Marius Jonker (South Africa)

25 September 2007
20:00

Romania	14–10	Portugal
Try: Țincu 63' c Corodeanu 72' c Con: Calafeteanu (1/1); Dumbrava (1/1)	Report	Try: Ferreira 18' c Con: D. Pinto (1/1); Pen: Malheiro (1/1) 69'

Stadium de Toulouse, Toulouse
Attendance: 35,526
Referee: Paul Honiss (New Zealand)

=== 2023 Rugby World Cup ===
Pos	Team	Pld	W	D	L	PF	PA	PD	TF	TA	B	Pts	Qualification
1	Wales	4	4	0	0	143	59	+84	17	8	3	19	Advance to knockout stage, and qualification to the 2027 Men's Rugby World Cup
2	Fiji	4	2	0	2	88	83	+5	9	9	3	11 (Note: Head-to-head: Australia 15–22 Fiji)	Advance to knockout stage, and qualification to the 2027 Men's Rugby World Cup
3	Australia	4	2	0	2	90	91	−1	11	8	3	11	Qualification to the 2027 Men's Rugby World Cup
4	Portugal	4	1	1	2	64	103	−39	8	13	0	6	
5	Georgia	4	0	1	3	64	113	−49	7	14	1	3	

Source: World Rugby
Rules for classification: Pool stage tiebreakers
Notes:

16 September 2023
17:45

Wales	28–8	Portugal
Try: Rees-Zammit 9'; Lake 43'; Morgan 56'; Faletau 83'; Con: Halfpenny 10', 44', 57'	Report	Try: Martins 63'; Pen: Marques 37'

Stade de Nice, Nice
Attendance: 28,700
Referee: Karl Dickson (Rugby Football Union)

23 September 2023
14:00 CEST (UTC+2)

Georgia	18–18	Portugal
Try: Tabutsadze 2' c Zamtaradze 78' m Con: Abzhandadze (1/1) 3'; Pen: Abzhandadze (2/2) 16', 32'	Report	Try: Storti (2) 34' m, 57' c Con: Marques (1/2) 58'; Pen: Marques (2/2) 48', 53'

Stadium de Toulouse, Toulouse
Attendance: 31,889
Referee: Paul Williams (New Zealand)

1 October 2023
17:45 CEST (UTC+2)

(1 BP) Australia	34–14	Portugal
Try: Arnold 19' c Porecki 22' c Bell 26' c McReight 47' m Koroibete 74' m Con: Donaldson (3/5) 20', 24', 27'; Pen: Donaldson (1/2) 4'	Report	Try: Bettencourt 13' c Simões 70' c Con: Marques (2/2) 14', 71'

Stade Geoffroy-Guichard, Saint-Étienne
Attendance: 41,342
Referee: Nika Amashukeli (Georgia)

8 October 2023
21:00 CEST (UTC+2)

(1 BP) Fiji	23–24	Portugal
Try: Botia 48' c Doge 68' c Con: Lomani (2/2) 49', 69'; Pen: Lomani (3/3) 10', 74', 76'	Report	Try: Storti 45' c Fernandes 51' c Marta 78' c Con: Marques (3/3) 47', 53', 79'; Pen: Marques (1/1) 38'

Stadium de Toulouse, Toulouse
Attendance: 32,223
Referee: Luke Pearce (England)

== Overall record ==
Up to date as of 2023 World Cup

Country	Pld	W	D	L	F	A	+/−	%
Australia	1	0	0	1	14	34	−20	0
Fiji	1	1	0	0	24	23	+1	100
Georgia	1	0	1	0	18	18	0	0
Italy	1	0	0	1	5	31	−26	0
New Zealand	1	0	0	1	13	108	−95	0
Romania	1	0	0	1	10	14	−4	0
Scotland	1	0	0	1	10	56	−46	0
Wales	1	0	0	1	8	28	−20	0
TOTAL	8	1	1	6	102	312	−210	23

== Team records ==
Highest team score

- 24 – vs Fiji 2023
- 18 - vs Georgia 2023
- 14 – vs Australia 2023
- 13 – vs New Zealand 2007
- 10 – vs Scotland 2007
- 10 – vs Romania 2007

Most tries in a game

- 3 - vs Fiji 2023
- 2 - vs Georgia 2023
- 2 - vs Australia 2023
- 1 – vs Scotland 2007
- 1 – vs New Zealand 2007
- 1 – vs Italy 2007
- 1 – vs Romania 2007
- 1 – vs Wales 2023

Most penalty goals in a game

- 2 - vs Georgia 2023
- 1 – vs Scotland 2007
- 1 – vs New Zealand 2007
- 1 – vs Romania 2007
- 1 – vs Wales 2023
- 1 - vs Fiji 2023

Biggest score against

- 108 – vs New Zealand, 2007
- 56 – vs Scotland, 2007
- 34 - vs Australia 2023
- 31 – vs Italy, 2007
- 28 – vs Wales 2023

Best winning margin

- 1 – vs Fiji 2023

Worst losing margin

- 95 – vs New Zealand, 2007
- 46 – vs Scotland, 2007
- 26 – vs Italy, 2007
- 20 – vs Wales 2023
- 20 - vs Australia 2023

== Individual records ==
Most points

- 24 - Samuel Marques
- 15 - Raffaele Storti
- 12 – Duarte Cardoso Pinto
- 6 – Gonçalo Malheiro
- 5 – David Penalva
- 5 – Rui Cordeiro
- 5 – Joaquim Ferreira
- 5 – Pedro Carvalho
- 5 – Nicolas Martins
- 5 – Pedro Bettencourt
- 5 – Rafael Simões
- 5 – Francisco Fernandes
- 5 – Rodrigo Marta

Most points in a game

- 10 - Raffaele Storti vs Georgia, 2023
- 9 - Samuel Marques vs Fiji, 2023
- 8 - Samuel Marques vs Georgia, 2023
- 5 – Duarte Cardoso Pinto vs New Zealand, 2007
- 5 – Rui Cordeiro vs New Zealand, 2007
- 5 – Pedro Carvalho vs Scotland, 2007
- 5 – Duarte Cardoso Pinto vs Scotland, 2007
- 5 – David Penalva vs Italy, 2007
- 5 – Joaquim Ferreira vs Romania, 2007
- 5 – Nicolas Martins vs Wales, 2023
- 5 – Pedro Bettencourt vs Australia, 2023
- 5 – Rafael Simões vs Australia, 2023
- 5 – Francisco Fernandes vs Fiji, 2023
- 5 – Rodrigo Marta vs Fiji, 2023

Most tries

- 3 - Raffaele Storti
- 1 – Pedro Carvalho
- 1 – Rui Cordeiro
- 1 – Joaquim Ferreira
- 1 – David Penalva
- 1 – Nicolas Martins
- 1 – Pedro Bettencourt
- 1 – Rafael Simões
- 1 – Francisco Fernandes
- 1 – Rodrigo Marta

Most penalty goals

- 4 – Samuel Marques
- 2 – Duarte Cardoso Pinto
- 1 – Gonçalo Malheiro

Most drop goals

- 1 – Gonçalo Malheiro
