= 1996–97 FIRA Tournament =

European rugby union championship

- Date: 22 November 1996 – 17 May 1997
- Countries: Belgium; Czech Republic; Denmark; Georgia; Germany; Morocco; Netherlands; Poland; Portugal; Russia; Spain; Tunisia

Tournament statistics
- Champions: Spain
- Matches played: 24

The 1996–97 FIRA Tournament was the 32nd edition of the European rugby union championship for national teams organized by the Fédération Internationale de Rugby Amateur (FIRA).

France, Italy and Romania did not participate, because of other appointments. France and Italy had to play the final of the previous trophy, due to the large number of international matches, only on 23 March 1997, after this tournament was started. Both countries were not interested in continuing their participation in the FIRA senior competitions and this would be their last presence at the competition.

The tournament had a new formula. Twelve teams were divided into four pools of 3 teams each. After a round robin, they were ranked in 3 groups to define the ranking, also valid to divide the teams for the second round qualification to the 1999 Rugby World Cup.

There was no second division, the other 18 European teams played the first round of qualification to the 1999 Rugby World Cup.

Spain and Portugal qualified for the First Place final, which was won 25-18 by the Spaniards.

== First round ==
=== Pool A ===
Pos	Team	Pld	W	D	L	PF	PA	PD	Pts	Qualification
1	Spain	2	2	0	0	102	17	+85	6	Qualified for 1–4th-place semifinals
2	Belgium	2	1	0	1	24	80	−56	4	Qualified for 5–8th-place semifinals
3	Germany	2	0	0	2	20	49	−29	2	Qualified for 9–12th-place semifinals

16 November 1996

Belgium	24–3	Germany

Brussels

24 November 1996

Germany	17–25	Spain

Fritz Grunebaum Stadium, Heidelberg
Referee: (Romania) M. Paraschivescu

8 December 1996

Spain	77–0	Belgium

Madrid

=== Pool B ===
Pos	Team	Pld	W	D	L	PF	PA	PD	Pts	Qualification
1	Georgia	2	2	0	0	47	34	+13	6	Qualified for 1–4th-place semifinals
2	Russia	2	1	0	1	57	43	+14	4	Qualified for 5–8th-place semifinals
3	Czech Republic	2	0	0	2	28	55	−27	2	Qualified for 9–12th-place semifinals

22 September 1996

Czech Republic	14–18	Georgia

Tatra Simchov Stadium, Prague

20 October 1996

Georgia	29–20	Russia
Try: Kavtararhvili, Modebadze, Nadiradze; Con: Machitidze; Pen: Machitidze (2); Drop: Iurini, Machitidze		Try: Boldakov; Pen: Boldakov (5)

National Stadium, Tbilisi
Referee: (France) G. Barrabes

26 October 1996

Russia	37–14	Czech Republic

Fili Stadium, Moscow
Referee: (Lithuania) A. Grombinas

=== Pool C ===
Pos	Team	Pld	W	D	L	PF	PA	PD	Pts	Qualification
1	Portugal	2	2	0	0	66	17	+49	6	Qualified for 1–4th-place semifinals
2	Tunisia	2	1	0	1	26	26	0	4	Qualified for 5–8th-place semifinals
3	Netherlands	2	0	0	2	26	75	−49	2	Qualified for 9–12th-place semifinals

27 October 1996

Netherlands	15–20	Tunisia

Leiden

24 November 1996

Portugal	55–11	Netherlands

Lisbon University Stadium, Lisbon

7 December 1996

Tunisia	6–11	Portugal

Tunis

=== Pool D ===
Pos	Team	Pld	W	D	L	PF	PA	PD	Pts	Qualification
1	Poland	2	2	0	0	33	26	+7	6	Qualified for 1–4th-place semifinals
2	Morocco	2	1	0	1	33	22	+11	4	Qualified for 5–8th-place semifinals
3	Denmark	2	0	0	2	15	33	−18	2	Qualified for 9–12th-place semifinals

28 September 1996

Poland	16–10	Denmark

Danzig

19 October 1996

Morocco	16–17	Poland

Casablanca

2 November 1996

Denmark	5–17	Morocco

Copenhagen

== Second round ==
- First to Fourth places Semifinals

19 April 1997

Portugal	21–17	Georgia
Try: Pires (2); Con: Amaral; Pen: Mourão (3)		Try: Nadiradze; Pen: Modebadze (3); Drop: Machididze

Lisbon University Stadium, Lisbon
Referee: (France) A. Fernandez

20 April 1997

Spain	44–10	Poland

Campo Universitario, Madrid

- 5th to 8th places Semifinals

20 April 1997

Belgium	9–14	Morocco

Brussels

20 April 1997

Tunisia	25–30	Russia

Tunis

- 9th to 12th places Semifinals

20 April 1997

Denmark	8–13	Germany

Aalborg

19 April 1997

Czech Republic	19–18	Netherlands

Prague

== Finals ==
- First Place Final

11 May 1997	Spain	25–18	Portugal	Campo Universitário, Madrid
	Try: Gutíerrez Merelles, Puertas Soto, C. Souto; Con: Aurrekeotxea Arregui (2); Pen: Aurrekeotxea Arregui (2)		Try: Bento, Portela; Con: Mourão; Pen: Mourão (2)
Spain: Francisco Puertas Soto, 14. Daniel Saenz Lobsack, 13. Álvar Enciso, 12. Pablo Calderón Sole, 11. Francisco Fernández Jiménez, 10. Unai Aurrekoetxea Arregui, 9. Aratz Gallastegui, 8. Carlos Souto, 7. Jaime Gutiérrez Merelles, 6. Diego Fuks Mitelmann, 5. Steve Tuineau Iloa, 4. José Miguel Villaú, 3. Víctor Torres, 2. Javier Aguiar Cayetano, 1. José Ignacio Zapatero - replacements: 16. Fernando de la Calle, 17. Oscar Solano Sevilla
Portugal: 15. Salvador Amaral, 14. António Rebelo Andrade, 13. João Bento, 12. Pedro Castro, 11. Marcello d'Orey, 10. Joaquim Ferreira, 9. Rohan Hoffmann, 8. Ricardo Vieira, 7. João Varela, 6. Paulo Silva, 5. Alcino Silva, 4. Miguel Portela, 3. Luís Pissarra, 2. José Pires, 1. Nuno Mourão - replacements: 16. António Cláudio, 17. Gonçalo Neto, 18. Luís Sequeira, 19. Sérgio Azevedo, 20. Sérgio Ferreira

- 3rd-place final

10 May 1997

Poland	29–23	Georgia
Try: Fedorowicz, Wróbel; Con: Szwichtenberg, Wróbel; Pen: Szymański (2), Urbanowicz (2)		Try: Katsadze, Andghuladze; Con: Iruni (2); Pen: Iurini (3)

Ogniwo, Sopot
Referee: (Germany) K. Blank

- 5th-place final

17 May 1997

Morocco	20–7	Russia

Settat

- 7th-place final

10 May 1997

Belgium	22–29	Tunisia

Brussels

- 9th-place final

11 May 1997

Czech Republic	9–14	Germany

Prague

- 11th-place final

10 May 1997

Netherlands	48–5	Denmark

Amsterdam

== Final ranking ==
1. Spain
2. Portugal
3. Poland
4. Georgia
5. Morocco
6. Russia
7. Tunisia
8. Belgium
9. Germany
10. Czech Republic
11. Netherlands
12. Denmark

== Bibliography ==
- (in Italian) Francesco Volpe, Valerio Vecchiarelli (2000), 2000 Italia in Meta, Storia della nazionale italiana di rugby dagli albori al Sei Nazioni, GS Editore (2000) ISBN 88-87374-40-6.
- (in Italian) Francesco Volpe, Paolo Pacitti (Author), Rugby 2000, GTE Gruppo Editorale (1999).
