= Salvador Palha =

Portuguese rugby union player

- Born: 14 April 1984 (age 42)
- Height: 1.81 m (5 ft 11 1/2 in)
- Weight: 86 kg (190 lb; 13.5 st)

Rugby union career
- Position: Flanker
International career
| Years | Team | Apps | (Points) |
| 2006–2010 | Portugal | 18 | (0) |

Salvador Palha (born Lisbon, 14 April 1984) is a Portuguese rugby union footballer. He plays as a lock.

Currently a member of Direito squad, he was called by Tomaz Morais for the 2007 Rugby World Cup finals, to replace the injured Marcello d'Orey. Palha played in the 14–10 loss to Romania.

Palha had 18 caps for the "Lobos", from 2007 to 2010, without ever scoring.
