= Vasco Uva =

Portuguese rugby union player

- Born: Vasco Maria Nunes Barata de Sousa Uva; 15 December 1982 (age 43) Lisbon, Portugal
- Height: 1.87 m (6 ft 2 in)
- Weight: 98 kg (216 lb)
- University: Catholic University of Portugal, Lisbon
- Notable relative(s): Gonçalo Uva, João Uva

Rugby union career
- Position: Number eight
Amateur team(s)
Years	Team	Apps	(Points)
2005–2007	Direito		
2008–2018	Direito		
Senior career
Years	Team	Apps	(Points)
2007–08	Montpellier	3	(0)
International career
Years	Team	Apps	(Points)
2003–2016	Portugal	101	(65)
- Correct as of 19 March 2016

Vasco Maria Nunes Barata de Sousa Uva (born 15 December 1982) is a Portuguese former rugby union player. He played as a number eight.

He took his law degree at the Catholic University of Portugal, in Lisbon, and he works as a lawyer.

== Club career ==
In Portugal he played for Grupo Desportivo Direito. He played briefly for Montpellier Hérault RC in the top division of French rugby, the Top 14 with his brother Gonçalo Uva, which he joined in January 2008. He soon moved back to Direito, where he was the captain, until finishing his career at 2017/18. He also played for Lusitanos XV at international level.

== International career ==
He was the captain of the Portugal national team in three of the four games at the 2007 Rugby World Cup finals. He was voted as Man of the Match in the 56–10 loss to Scotland. He commanded his team extremely well against New Zealand's All Blacks, but he fractured his hand against Italy and missed the last game of the RWC with Romania.

He was replaced as the capitan of the "Lobos" by João Correia before the match played with Russia, at 1 March 2008, which resulted in a 26–41 loss.

After the RWC he co-wrote Hoje é por Portugal (2007) (Today is For Portugal), a title taken from his quote before the first game against Scotland, a book that relates everything that this amateur team, and himself as the captain, lived before the qualifications and during this major sportive and professional event of their lives.

He had 101 caps for the Portugal National Team, from 2003 to 2016, with 13 tries scored, 65 points in aggregate. He is one of the most capped players for Portugal, and is also the first men's player from outside the Rugby Championship or Six Nations countries to reach the 100-cap mark.
