= Gonçalo Uva =

Portuguese rugby union player

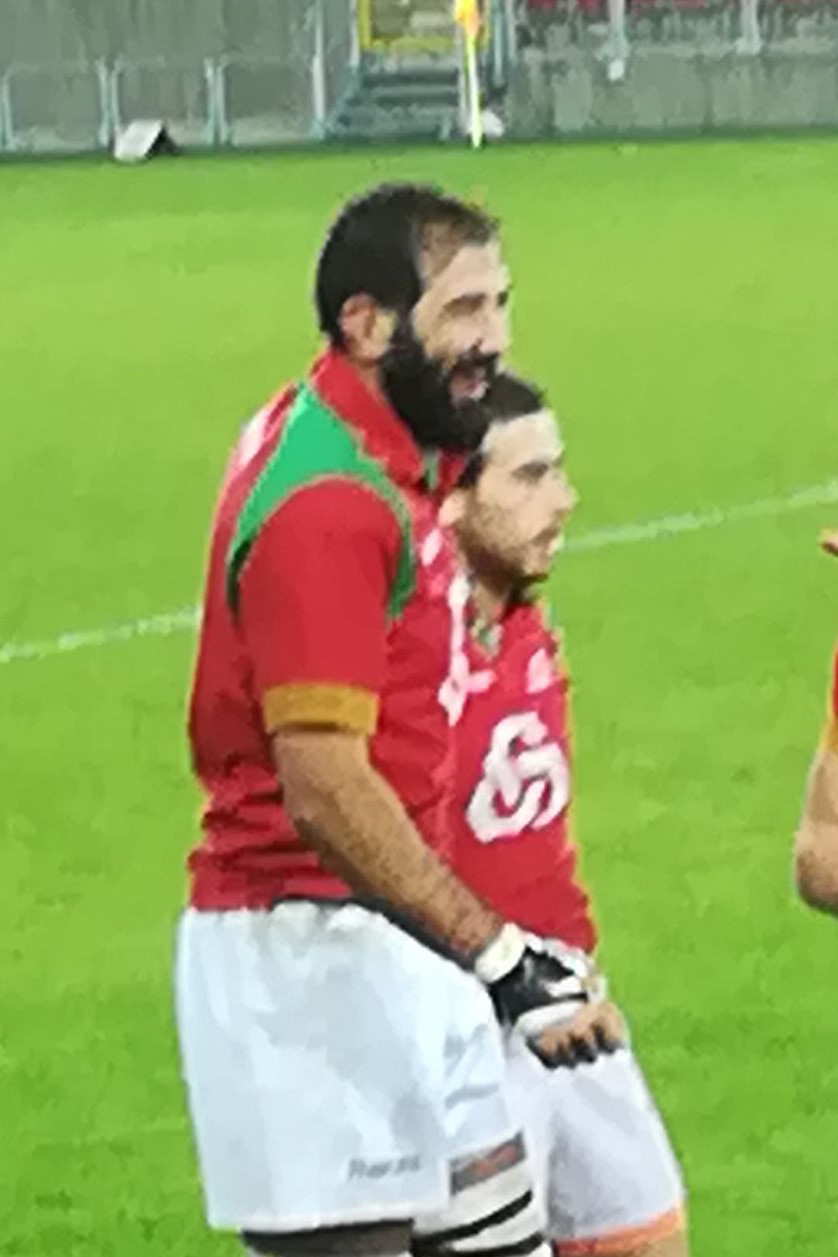
- Born: Gonçalo Nunes Barata de Sousa Uva; 3 October 1984 (age 42) Lisbon, Portugal
- Height: 2.02 m (6 ft 8 in)
- Weight: 112 kg (17 st 9 lb)
- Notable relative(s): Vasco Uva (brother); João Uva (cousin)

Rugby union career
- Position: Lock
Amateur team(s)
Years	Team	Apps	(Points)
2009–10	G.D. Direito		
Senior career
Years	Team	Apps	(Points)
2006–2011	Montpellier	39	(5)
2012–2014	Narbonne	28	(5)
2014–2018	G.D. Direito		
- Correct as of 15 December 2021
International career
Years	Team	Apps	(Points)
2004–2018	Portugal	101	(45)
- Correct as of 1 March 2019

Gonçalo Uva (born 3 October 1984 in Lisbon) is a former Portuguese rugby union player. He played as a lock.

He played for Montpellier Hérault RC and RC Narbonne, in French rugby, the Top 14. He played for Grupo Desportivo Direito, in Portugal, where he finished his career in 2017/18.

Uva had 101 caps for Portugal, from 2004 to 2018. He scored 9 tries, 45 points on aggregate. Uva is the brother of Vasco Uva, and cousin of João Uva, both rugby players. They all played at the 2007 Rugby World Cup. Gonçalo Uva played in all the four games at the competition, without scoring.
