= Santamans =

Santamans is a surname. Notable people with the surname include:

- Anna Santamans (born 1993), French swimmer
- Daniel Santamans (1959–2008), French rugby union player and coach
- Joana Santamans (born 1977), Catalan illustrator
