= Paulo Murinello =

Portuguese rugby union player and coach

- Born: 4 May 1974 (age 52) Mozambique
- Height: 1.74 m (5 ft 8 1/2 in)
- Weight: 85 kg (187 lb; 13.4 st)

Rugby union career
- Position: Flanker
International career
Years	Team	Apps	(Points)
2003–2007	Portugal	30	

Paulo Murinello (born Mozambique, 4 May 1974) is a former Portuguese rugby union player and a current project manager of Mafalala Rugby Clube, Maputo, Mozambique. He played as a flanker.

He started and finished is playing career for Grupo Dramático e Sportivo de Cascais, Portugal, but also representend CDUL, Portugal and Universidad de Sevilla, Spain.

He has a degree on Sports Management at the Faculdade de Motricidade Humana, ULisboa, while he was the Academy Coordinator of CDUL RUGBY and CASCAIS RUGBY.

He won for Portugal the 2003-2004 European Nations Cup and played from 2002 to 2007 the World Sevens Series.

Murinello had 30 caps for Portugal Rugby Union, from 2003 to 2007. He played at 2007 Rugby World Cup, France, playing in all the four matches, being referred on Tomaz Morais book, as the soul of the team.
