= Ruben Spachuck =

Argentine-born Portuguese rugby union footballer

Ruben Spachuk
- Born: Cristian Ruben Spachuk; 14 February 1981 (age 45) Argentina
- Height: 1.81 m (5 ft 11 in)
- Weight: 114 kg (251 lb)

Rugby union career
- Position: Prop
Senior career
Years	Team	Apps	(Points)
– 2007	CF Os Belenenses		
2007 – 2008	Blagnac SCR	22	(0)
2008 – 2009	FC Auch Gers	13	(0)
2009 – 2011	US Colomiers	31	(0)
2011 – 2017	CS Bourgoin-Jallieu	110	(0)
- Correct as of 6 July 2020
International career
Years	Team	Apps	(Points)
2005–2014	Portugal	47	(10)
- Correct as of 20 June 2013

Cristian Ruben Spachuck, commonly known as Ruben Spachuck (born 14 February 1981), is an Argentine-born Portuguese rugby union footballer. He played as a prop.

He was one of the four Belenenses players at the 2007 Rugby World Cup finals. He moved to the French team of Blagnac after the tournament, where he played in 2007/08. He also would play for FC Auch Gers, in 2008/09, US Colomiers, from 2009/10 to 2010/11, and CS Bourgoin-Jallieu, where he played from 2011/12 to 2016/17, when he finished his career.

He had 47 caps for Portugal, from 2005 to 2014, with 2 tries scored, 10 points on aggregate. Spachuck's first game for Portugal came on 5 February 2005, against Georgia, in an 18–14 win. He played in all the four games of Portugal at the 2007 Rugby World Cup, without scoring. He had his last game on 8 March 2014, in a 34–18 defeat to Russia, in Sochi, aged 33 years old, in a 2015 Rugby World Cup qualifier.

== International Statistics ==
- Ruben Spachuck International Statistics
