= Juan Murré =

Portugal international rugby union player

- Born: Juan Manuel Murré; 21 March 1980 Argentina
- Height: 1.86 m (6 ft 1 in)
- Weight: 114 kg (251 lb)

Rugby union career
- Position: Prop
Senior career
Years	Team	Apps	(Points)
2001–04	Belgrano		
2004–07	Belenenses		
2007–08	Pozzi Livorno	14	(5)
2008–09	St-Nazaire	11	(0)
2009–10	Auch		
2010–11	Cetransa		
2011–12	Saint-Étienne		
2012–2013	Stade dijonnais		
2013–2014	RAC Saint-Jean-d'Angély		
2014–2015	Aparejadores Burgos		
International career
Years	Team	Apps	(Points)
2006–2013	Portugal	37	(10)
- Correct as of 23 November 2013

Juan Manuel Murré (born 21 March 1980) is a former rugby union player. He played as a prop. Born in Argentina, he is a naturalised citizen of Portugal and has played for that national team.

== Career ==
Murré first played in Portugal at Belenenses, later becoming a naturalized Portuguese citizen. He was soon selected for the Portugal squad which played at the 2007 Rugby World Cup finals. He won his first cap at the 10–56 defeat to Scotland, and also played in the matches against Italy and Romania. He was assigned to the Italian team of Pozzi Livorno soon after.

He was a regular player with the Portugal squad, from 2006 to 2013, counting 37 caps with 2 tries scored, 10 points in aggregate.
