= José Pinto (rugby union) =

Portuguese rugby union player

- Born: José Manuel Duarte Pinto Neves; 5 February 1981 (age 45) Lisbon
- Height: 1.75 m (5 ft 9 in)
- Weight: 83 kg (183 lb)

Rugby union career
- Position: Scrum-half
International career
Years	Team	Apps	(Points)
2001–2012	Portugal	57	(22)

José Manuel Duarte Pinto Neves (born 5 February 1981, in Lisbon) is a Portuguese rugby union player. He plays as a scrum-half and fullback. He's graduated in medicine.

José Pinto was a leading name for Direito, from 1999/2000 until 2006/2007. After the 2007 Rugby World Cup finals he moved to CRC Madrid Noroeste. He was assigned by the Italian professional team of Benetton Treviso, in November 2007.

He played in all four games at the 2007 Rugby World Cup, and was chosen as Man of the Match in the 31–5 loss to Italy. He was assigned to an Italian team soon after joining Benetton Treviso for the remainder of the 2007/2008 season. He joined Rugby Roma Olimpic in the off-season for the 2008/2009 season.

José Pinto had 57 caps for Portugal, from 2001 to 2012, with 3 tries, 2 conversion and 1 penalty, 20 points in aggregate.
