= Bogdan Bălan =

Romania international rugby union player

- Born: 11 February 1980 (age 46) Brăila, Romania
- Height: 1.83 m (6 ft 0 in)
- Weight: 105 kg (231 lb)

Rugby union career
- Position: Prop
Youth career
- RC Brăila
Senior career
| Years | Team | Apps | (Points) |
| 1999–2000 | RC Timișoara | | |
| 2000–2004 | U Cluj | | |
| 2004–2005 | CA Bordeaux | | |
| 2005–2010 | US Montauban | 103 | (15) |
| 2010–2015 | Lyon OU | 78 | (5) |
| 2016–2017 | SC Nègrepelisse | | |
International career
| Years | Team | Apps | (Points) |
| 2003–2011 | Romania | 29 | (10) |

Bogdan Bălan (born 11 February 1980 in Brăila) is a Romanian former rugby union footballer who played as prop.

Balan began his rugby career playing for Brăila in his home town. He then played for Timişoara, U Cluj and Bucharest Wolves. After that he moved to France and played for Bègles Bordeaux who were in Fédérale 1 at the time. He helped them get promoted to the Pro D2, and then joined US Montauban in 2005. Montauban was promoted from the Pro D2 to France's premier competition the Top 14 following Balan's first season with them.

He also played for Lyon, helping them win two Rugby Pro D2 titles.

Bălan was first selected for Romania in 2003 when he played against Georgia on 30 March that year. He has participated in the European Nations Cup, and in the 2007 Rugby World Cup.

== Honours ==
Club
Montauban
Pro D2 (1): 2005–06

Lyon
Pro D2 (2): 2010–11, 2013–14

International
Romania
European Nations Cup (1): 2006
