= Diogo Coutinho =

Portuguese rugby union player

- Born: 3 September 1977 (age 49) Lisbon
- Height: 1.88 m (6 ft 2 in)
- Weight: 102 kg (225 lb; 16.1 st)

Rugby union career
- Position: Loose forward
International career
Years	Team	Apps	(Points)
2000–2007	Portugal	35	(20)

Diogo Coutinho (born 3 September 1977) is a former Portuguese rugby union footballer. He played as a flanker for Direito, a Lisbon team.

He had 35 caps for Portugal, from 2000 to 2007, scoring 4 tries, 20 points in aggregate. Coutinho played in three games at the 2007 Rugby World Cup and was chosen as the Man of the Match in the 10–14 loss to Romania.

His last cap was at 1 December 2007, in an 8–23 loss to Romania.
