= André Silva (rugby union, born 1975) =

Portugal international rugby union player

André da Silva
- Born: André Lourenço da Silva; 9 February 1975 (age 51) Paris, France
- Height: 1.74 m (5 ft 9 in)
- Weight: 115 kg (254 lb)

Rugby union career
- Position: Prop
Senior career
Years	Team	Apps	(Points)
- Racing Métro
- RC Orléans
2001 – 2002	CA Périgueux	13	(0)
- Bourgoin
- Toulon
– 2007	Nimes		
2007 – 2008	Stade Montois	2	(0)
2008 -	RC Carqueiranne-Hyères		
International career
Years	Team	Apps	(Points)
2007 – 2007	Portugal	5	(0)
- Correct as of 22 February 2010

André Lourenço da Silva (born 9 February 1975) is a French-born Portuguese rugby union player, who plays as a prop. Born in Paris, he had his debut in French rugby for Racing Club de France, aged 17.

He already played for RC Orléans, CA Périgueux, CS Bourgoin-Jallieu, RC Toulon and RC Nîmes. He played for Stade Montois, for the season of 2007/08, and plays for RC Carqueiranne-Hyères, since 2008/09.

He chose to represent Portugal, having his debut the same year, at 10 March 2007, with Uruguay, in a 12–5, at the repechage for the Rugby World Cup qualifying. He was on the squad that went to 2007 Rugby World Cup finals, playing two matches, being the last one with Italy, at a 31–5 loss. He had five games without scoring for the Portuguese squad by the end of the tournament, and has been absent from the national team since.
