= Joaquim Ferreira (rugby union) =

Portuguese rugby union footballer and coach

- Born: 27 April 1973 (age 53)
- Height: 1.75 m (5 ft 9 in)
- Weight: 100 kg (220 lb; 15 st 10 lb)

Rugby union career
- Position: Hooker
International career
Years	Team	Apps	(Points)
1993–2007	Portugal	84	(15)

Joaquim Vaz Ferreira (born 27 April 1973 in Porto) is a former Portuguese rugby union player.

== Career ==
The Portuguese prop played all his career for Centro Desportivo Universitário do Porto (CDUP), since he was 17 years old. His first national team match was on 3 April 1993, in a 41–13 loss to Romania, in Lisbon. He is currently the most capped player from his country, having played 84 games for Portugal national team, with 3 tries scored, 15 points in aggregate, from 1993 to 2007.

Ferreira played in three games at the 2007 Rugby World Cup, scoring a try against Romania, in a 14–10 loss, in what would be his last competitive match. He was the captain of that same game due to Vasco Uva's absence. He retired from rugby after the tournament, aged 34. He was assistant coach to Tomaz Morais in the Portugal national team. He was nominated head coach of CDUP for the 2008/2009 season.
