= Peter Allan (rugby union) =

Scottish rugby union referee (born 1975)

- Born: Peter Allan; 19 July 1975 (age 51) Edinburgh, Scotland
- Occupation: Rugby union referee

Rugby union career
- Position: Prop
Amateur team(s)
Years	Team	Apps	(Points)
- Watsonians
Refereeing career
Years	Competition		Apps
2010	1872 Cup		

Peter Allan (born 19 July 1975) is a professional rugby union referee who represented the Scottish Rugby Union.

== Rugby union career ==
=== Playing career ===
==== Amateur career ====
Allan played as prop for Watsonians.

=== Referee career ===
==== Professional career ====
Allan won SRU referee of the year in 2005-06 season.

Allan refereed in the Celtic League.

He refereed his first 1872 Cup match on 2 January 2010.

He is now an Assistant Referee in the English Premiership.

==== International career ====
He was the fifth official in the Scotland v New Zealand match in the 2007 Rugby World Cup Pool C
