= Alexandru Manta =

- Born: 7 June 1977 (age 49) Bucharest, Romania
- Height: 1.90 m (6 ft 3 in)
- Weight: 100 kg (220 lb)

Rugby union career
- Position(s): Flanker, Number eight
Youth career
- (Romania) Locomotiva București
Senior career
Years	Team	Apps	(Points)
1995–1998	RC Timișoara		
1998	Terrasson		
1998–2002	Aurillac		
2002–2003	CA Bègles	15	(20)
2003–2006	Pau	48	(30)
2006–2007	Castres	21	(5)
2007–2009	CA Brive	34	(35)
2009	Avenir Valencien	0	(0)
2009–2013	Lyon OU	65	(20)
2013–2015	La Voulte-Valence	29	(0)
2015–2016	CS Vienne	13	(5)
International career
Years	Team	Apps	(Points)
1996–2012	Romania	40	(60)

Alexandru Manta (born 7 June 1977 in Bucharest) is a Romanian former rugby union footballer.

== Career ==
Manta spent the majority of his career in France, playing for USC Terrasson (1998), Stade Aurillacois (1998/02), Bègles-Bordeaux (2002/03), Section Paloise (2003/06), Castres Olympique (2006/07), CA Brive (2007/09), Lyon OU (2009/13), La Voulte-Valence (2013/15) and CS Vienne (2015/16).

Manta made his debut for Romania in 1996 against Belgium, in an 83–5 win. He played three matches at the 2007 Rugby World Cup, scoring a try against Italy (18–24).

== Honours ==
Club
Lyon
Pro D2
Champion: 2010–11

Pau
European Challenge Cup
Runner-up: 2004–05

International
Romania
European Nations Cup
Winner: 2006
