= Florin Corodeanu =

Romanian rugby union player

- Born: 26 March 1977 (age 49)
- Height: 1.90 m (6 ft 3 in)
- Weight: 104 kg (229 lb; 16.4 st)

Rugby union career
- Position: Flanker
International career
Years	Team	Apps	(Points)
1997-2009	Romania	60	(55)

Florin Corodeanu (born 26 March 1977 in Piatra Neamţ) is a Romanian former rugby union flanker.

He played for several clubs in France including Stade Aurillacois and FC Grenoble.

Corodeanu won 60 caps for Romania, with 11 tries scored, 55 points on aggregate, since his first game, on 1 June 1997, a 20-51 loss with France.

Corodeanu played three times at the Rugby World Cup finals. He counts three games at both the 1999 Rugby World Cup and the 2003 Rugby World Cup, and four games at the 2007 Rugby World Cup, where he scored a try in the 14-10 win over Portugal.
