= David Bortolussi =

Italian rugby union footballer

- Born: David Bortolussi; 21 June 1981 (age 45) Auch, France
- Height: 6 ft 2 in (1.88 m)
- Weight: 14 st 4 lb (91 kg)

Rugby union career
- Position: Full-back / Wing
- Current team: JS Riscle
Senior career
Years	Team	Apps	(Points)
____ - 00	JS Riscle	? (?)	
2000 - 02	FC Auch	16	(91)
2002 - 03	Bègles-Bordeaux	15	(42)
2003 - 08	Montpellier Hérault RC	68	(517)
2008 - 10	US Dax	27	(35)
2010 -	JS Riscle		
International career
Years	Team	Apps	(Points)
2006-2008	Italy	16	(153)

David Bortolussi (born 21 June 1981) is a French-born Italian rugby union footballer. He usually plays at full back or on the wing.

== Club career ==
He played for French club Montpellier Hérault RC in the top league, the Top 14, from 2003/04 to 2007/08. He previously played for other French clubs Bègles-Bordeaux in 2002-03, FC Auch in 2001-02 and JS Riscle in 2010/11, becoming player-coach in 2015/16.

== International career ==
Bortolussi had 16 caps for the national rugby team of Italy, having made his debut in a Test against Japan, in 52-6 win, in Tokyo from 2006 to 2008, scoring 1 try, 35 conversions, 25 penalties and 1 drop goal, 153 points on aggregate. He played for Italy during the 2006 Autumn internationals. He was called for the 2007 Rugby World Cup, playing in all four games, scoring 4 conversions and 8 penalties, 32 points on aggregate. It would be his only presence at the competition. He played at the 2008 Six Nations Championship, in two games, scoring 1 conversion and 6 penalties, 20 points on aggregate. He had his last cap for the national team at 10 February 2008, at the 19-23 loss to England, in Rome, in a game where he scored 1 conversion and 4 penalties. He was only 26 years old.
