= Daniel Santamans =

French rugby union player and coach (1959–2008)

Daniel Santamans (4 September 1959 in Lombez – 26 July 2008 in Cugnaux) was a French former rugby union player, as a hooker, and coach.

He played for Blagnac SCR and Stade Toulousain from 1977 to 1989, during which he won 3 titles of French Champion (1985, 1986 and 1989) and a Coupe de France (French Cup) in 1984.

After ending his player career, he became a coach, first at the youth level of Stade Toulousain (1989–1995). He won 4 titles (1990, 1991, 1994 and 1995) before being promoted to assistant coach at the main team (1995–1997). He won the French Championship in 1997.

He later coached the French teams of FC Lourdes (2000–2002), Tarbes Pyrénées Rugby (2002–2003), and Blagnac SCR (2003–2004).

Santamans was signed for Romania in 2004, where he remained until 2007. He won the Six Nations Tournament, Group B, in 2006 and qualified Romania for the 2007 Rugby World Cup finals. Romania achieved a bonus point in the 18–24 loss to Italy and a 14–10 win over Portugal.

After that, he returned to France to become the coach of Blagnac SCR.

He died unexpectedly from a cardiovascular accident at the funeral of his mother, aged only 48.

Sporting positions
Preceded by (France) Robert Antonin (caretaker)	Romanian National Rugby Union Coach; 2004–2007	Succeeded by (Romania) Marin Mot
