= Scott Lawson =

Scotland international rugby union player

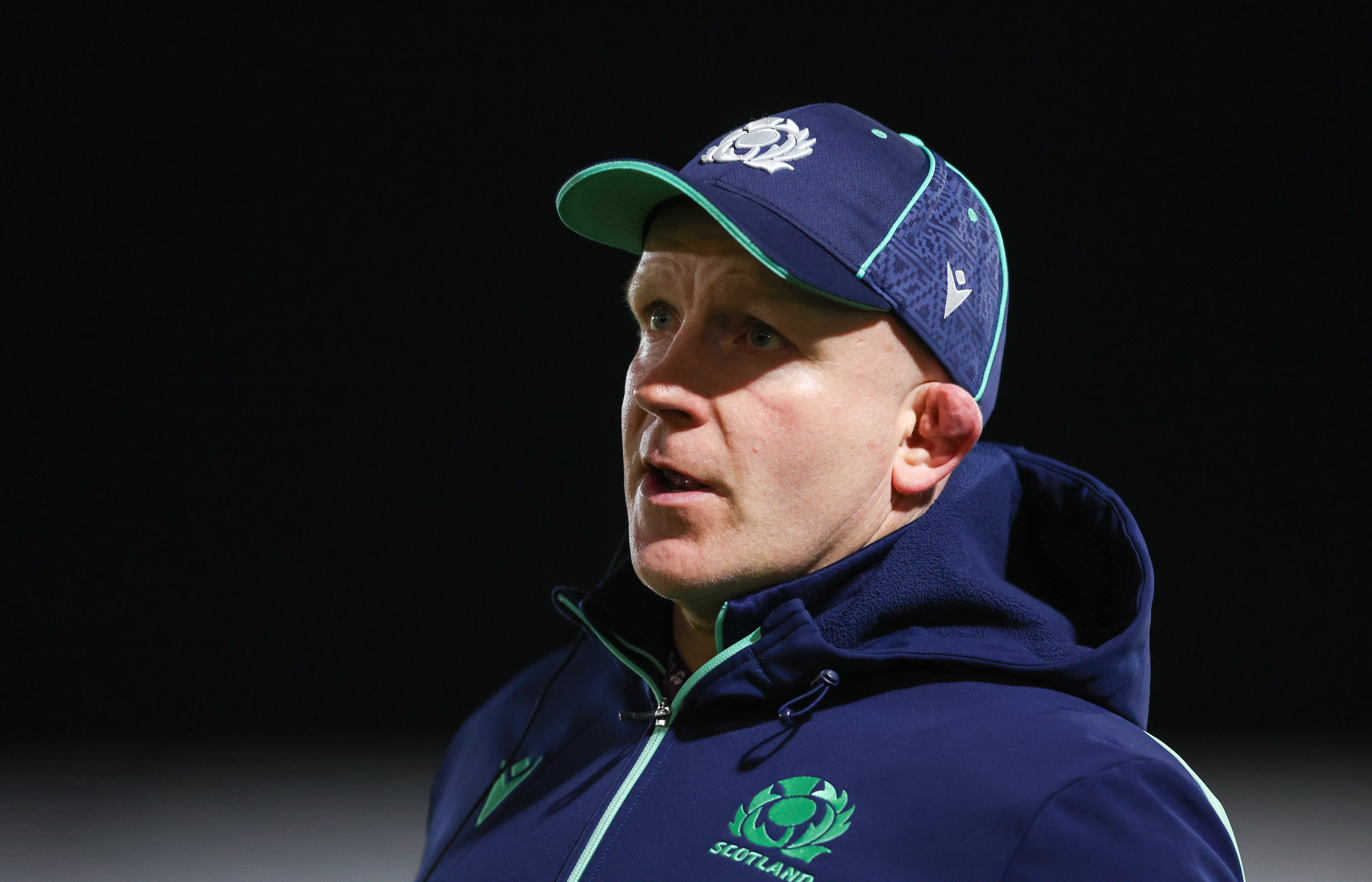
- Born: Scott Lawson; 28 September 1981 (age 45) Lanark, Scotland
- Height: 1.73 m (5 ft 8 in)
- Weight: 96 kg (15 st 2 lb)

Rugby union career
- Position: Hooker
Amateur team(s)
Years	Team	Apps	(Points)
—	Biggar RFC		
Senior career
Years	Team	Apps	(Points)
2002–2007	Glasgow Warriors	91	(15)
2007–2008	Sale Sharks	4	(0)
2008–2012	Gloucester	89	(20)
2012–2013	London Irish	18	(0)
2013–2018	Newcastle Falcons	128	(30)
2002–2018	Total	340	(65)
- Correct as of 3 June 2018
International career
Years	Team	Apps	(Points)
2005–2018	Scotland	47	(10)
- Correct as of 3 June 2018

Scott Lawson (born 28 September 1981) is a Scottish rugby union coach and former international player. He played as a hooker and earned 47 caps for the Scotland national team during a 13-year international career, including appearances at the 2007 and 2011 Rugby World Cups. Following his professional playing career, Lawson now coaches within Scottish Rugby’s high-performance pathway, including appointments across the male and female national teams.

== Early Life and Amateur Career ==
Lawson began his rugby career with Biggar, progressing through the youth ranks to the club’s senior side. Following this he played for Melrose for a season with his performances at club level leading to selection for professional rugby in Scotland.

== Professional career ==
Lawson began his professional career with Glasgow Warriors, playing in the Celtic League. He later moved to Sale Sharks, before signing with Gloucester Rugby in 2008. After four seasons with Gloucester, Lawson joined London Irish in 2012.

In 2013, Lawson signed with Newcastle Falcons ahead of the 2013–14 Aviva Premiership season. He played a significant role in helping the Falcons transition from a newly promoted side to a top-four Premiership team, contributing leadership and stability to the forward pack.

== International career ==
Lawson made his Scotland debut in 2005 and was selected for the 2007 Rugby World Cup, scoring a try in Scotland’s opening match against Portugal. He also featured in the 2011 Rugby World Cup, reinforcing his position as a key member of Scotland’s front row over two World Cup cycles.

After a four-year absence from international selection, Lawson earned a recall ahead of the 2018 Six Nations, maintaining his place in the squad until his final cap at the age of 36, making him Scotland’s oldest-ever professional Test player.

== Club career ==
In April 2013, Lawson signed for Newcastle Falcons ahead of the 2013–14 Premiership Rugby season. Over five seasons, he made 109 appearances and played a crucial role in the club’s rise from newly promoted status to a top-four Premiership team and earned a semi-final berth in 2018.

== Coaching career ==
After retiring in 2018, Lawson was appointed Director of Rugby at the University of St Andrews. He later transitioned into Scottish Rugby as a Specialist Skills Coach, working across both the men's and women's performance pathways with involvement in Scotland U19, Scotland U20, and the Futures programme.

== Personal life ==
Lawson currently resides in St Andrews, Fife, with his wife Ella and their four children: Fran, Orla, Quinlan, and Ada.
