= Hugh Watkins (rugby union) =

- Born: 3 September 1963 (age 63)

Rugby union career
Refereeing career
Years	Competition	Apps
2007	Rugby World Cup	

Hugh David Watkins (born 3 September 1963) is a Welsh former rugby union referee. He was selected as a touch judge at the 2007 Rugby World Cup, before being used as a television match official later in the competition. In 2008, he was hired by the Worcester Warriors rugby team as a consultant in charge of reviewing the team's performances. That same year, he was hired as the video referee on the UK television game show Gladiators.
