= Víctor Torres (rugby union) =

- Born: 31 January 1967 (age 59) Spain
- Height: 6 ft 1 in (1.85 m)
- Weight: 242 lb (110 kg)

Rugby union career
- Position: Prop
Senior career
Years	Team	Apps	(Points)
- U.E. Santboiana
International career
Years	Team	Apps	(Points)
1998-1999	Spain	9	(5)

Víctor Torres Funes (born 31 January 1967) is a Spanish rugby union player. He played as prop.

== Career ==
His first international cap was during a test match against Germany, at Heidelberg, on 26 April 1998. He was in the 1999 Rugby World Cup roster, playing two matches.
