= Miguel Portela =

Portuguese rugby union player

- Born: 4 March 1974 (age 52) Lisbon
- Height: 1.86 m (6 ft 1 in)
- Weight: 85 kg (187 lb; 13.4 st)

Rugby union career
- Position: Centre
International career
Years	Team	Apps	(Points)
1996–2010	Portugal	59	(28)

Miguel Portela de Morais (born 4 March 1974 in Lisbon) is a Portuguese former rugby union player. He played as a center, although he was also capable of nearly all positions, except prop and hooker. He was a leading member of the Grupo Desportivo Direito team. Professionally, he is a lawyer.

Miguel Portela had 59 caps, from 1996 to 2010, with 5 tries and a drop goal scored, in an aggregate of 28 points.

He was a member of the Portuguese squad present at the 2007 Rugby World Cup finals. He played in all four matches, without scoring. His four children are Jerónimo Portela Morais, Duarte Portela Morais, Benedita Portela Morais and Rosinha Portela Morais a mais linda.
