= David Penalva =

Portuguese rugby union player

- Born: David Penalva; 26 January 1980 (age 46) Bayonne, France
- Height: 1.94 m (6 ft 4 in)
- Weight: 100 kg (220 lb)

Rugby union career
- Position: Lock
Senior career
Years	Team	Apps	(Points)
– 2002	Biarritz		
– 2005	Tours		
2005 – 2006	Poitiers		
2006	Belenenses		
2006 – 2008	Blagnac	48	(15)
2008 – 2010	Auch	37	(0)
2010 –	Nice	5	(0)
International career
Years	Team	Apps	(Points)
2002–2012	Portugal	35	(5)

David Penalva (born 26 January 1980 in France) is a Portuguese rugby union footballer. He plays as a lock.

Penalva played for Nice, in the French Fédérale 1, for the 2010–11 season.

He had 35 caps for Portugal, from 2002 to 2012, scoring 1 try, 5 points on aggregate. Penalva made his debut for the national side on 3 March 2002, in a 13–10 win over Spain, in Caldas da Rainha for the Six Nations B. He was called for the 2007 Rugby World Cup, playing in all the four games and scoring a try in the third game against Italy in a 31–5 loss. That would be the single points of his international career. Penalva's most recent game was at 10 March 2012, in a 23–17 win over Spain, in Coimbra, for the Six Nations B. He has been absent from the National Team since then.
