= Duarte Cardoso Pinto =

Portuguese rugby union footballer

- Born: 17 March 1982 (age 44) Lisbon, Portugal
- Height: 1.73 m (5 ft 8 in)
- Weight: 83 kg (183 lb; 13.1 st)

Rugby union career
- Position: Fly-half
International career
Years	Team	Apps	(Points)
2003–2010	Portugal	45	(107)

Duarte Daun e Lorena Cardoso Pinto (born 17 March 1982 in Lisbon) is a Portuguese rugby union footballer. He plays as a fly-half.

Before moving to France, he played for Agronomia in Portugal, where he won the National Championship title in 2006–2007. He played for Blagnac in the French Second Division, in 2007/08.

He had 45 caps for the Portugal national team, from 2003 to 2010, and scored a total of 107 points (2 tries, 17 conversions and 21 penalties). He was a member of the Portugal squad that went to the 2007 Rugby World Cup. He played in all four games, being the top scorer for his country, with 2 conversions and 3 penalties, 12 points in aggregate.
