= Rui Cordeiro =

Portuguese rugby union footballer

- Born: 14 October 1976 (age 50) Figueira da Foz, Portugal
- Height: 1.85 m (6 ft 1 in)
- Weight: 130 kg (287 lb)

Rugby union career
- Position: Prop
Amateur team(s)
Years	Team	Apps	(Points)
- Académica de Coimbra
International career
Years	Team	Apps	(Points)
2002–2007	Portugal	44	(10)

Rui Pedro Godinho Cordeiro (born 14 October 1976) is a Portuguese former rugby union footballer. He played as a prop. He has a degree in veterinary medicine.

== Club career ==
Cordeiro played for Académica de Coimbra. He won the National II Division title in 1998–99 and 2006–07, and the National I Division title in 2003–04.

== International career ==
He had 46 caps for the Portugal national team, from 2002 to 2007, having scored 2 tries, 10 points in aggregate.

He was a member of the Portugal squad at the 2007 Rugby World Cup, and played in all four games. He was one of the heaviest players of the competition, with 138 kg. He scored Portugal's only try in their 108–13 loss to New Zealand on 15 September 2007. The try was particularly memorable for the Portuguese because it was achieved in a maul with the All Blacks. The try was only awarded after consulting the video referee.

He announced that he was leaving the National Team and finishing his career after the tournament. He returned in 2011/12 for a final season with Académica.
