= Luís Pissarra =

Portuguese rugby union player

- Born: 5 October 1975 (age 51) Lisbon
- Height: 1.71 m (5 ft 7 in)
- Weight: 73 kg (161 lb; 11.5 st)

Rugby union career
- Position: Scrum-half
International career
Years	Team	Apps	(Points)
1996–2007	Portugal	73	(0)

Luís Eduardo Pissarra (born 5 October 1975) is a Portuguese former rugby union player of Argentine descent. He played as a scrum-half for AEIS Agronomia, with whom he won the Campeonato Nacional Honra/Super Bock in 2006–07.

Pissarra has 73 caps for the Portugal national team, from 1996 to 2007. He was the vice-captain of the Portugal squad at the 2007 Rugby World Cup, where he played in all four games. He left the national team after the 8–23 loss to Romania, on 1 December 2007, aged 32, in a match where he was the captain. He never scored during his international career.

He is currently one of the national team's assistant coaches.
