= Gonçalo Malheiro =

Portuguese rugby union player

- Born: 11 May 1978 (age 48) Porto
- Height: 1.73 m (5 ft 8 in)
- Weight: 87 kg (192 lb; 13.7 st)

Rugby union career
- Position(s): Fly-half, Fullback. Scrum-half
International career
Years	Team	Apps	(Points)
1998–2007	Portugal	41	(279)

Gonçalo Pinto de Mesquita Viegas Malheiro (born 11 May 1978, in Porto) is a Portuguese rugby union footballer. He plays as a fly-half. He works as a civil engineer. He took his degree at University of Porto.

Malheiro played at first at CDUP. He spent a season at Madrid 2012, in 2004/05, where he became a professional and was the top scorer of the Spanish League, with 249 points scored.

He had 39 caps for Portugal, since his debut, in 1998, scoring a total of 261 points (8 tries, 25 conversions, 42 penalties and 15 drop goals). This makes him the current top scorer for the "Lobos".

Malheiro played twice at the 2007 Rugby World Cup finals, with New Zealand, in a 108–13 loss, scoring the first drop goal of the tournament, and Romania, in a narrow 14–10 loss, scoring a penalty.

His last cap was at the 8–23 loss to Romania, at 1 December 2007, for the Six Nations B.
