= João Correia (rugby union) =

Portuguese rugby union player

- Born: João Carlos Gonçalves Correia; 19 August 1979 (age 47) Lisbon
- Height: 1.74 m (5 ft 9 in)
- Weight: 100 kg (220 lb)

Rugby union career
- Position(s): Hooker, Prop
International career
Years	Team	Apps	(Points)
2003–2014	Portugal	80	(20)

João Carlos Gonçalves Correia (born 19 August 1979 in Lisbon) is a Portuguese rugby union player. He plays as a hooker. He is professionally a physician.

He is a member of Direito, where he already won several titles of the National Championship.

He has 74 caps for Portugal, since his first game, in 2003, with 4 tries scored, 20 points on aggregate. Correia was a member of the Portugal squad that entered the 2007 Rugby World Cup finals, playing in all of the four games. He became the captain of the "Lobos" at the same game where he scored his first try at 1 March 2008, with Russia (26–41). He's been the National Team captain since then.
