= Vano Nadiradze =

Georgia international rugby union player

- Born: 23 February 1972 (age 54) Gurjaani, Kakheti, Georgia
- Height: 6 ft 5 in (196 cm)
- Weight: 242 lb (110 kg)

Rugby union career
- Position: Lock
International career
Years	Team	Apps	(Points)
1994–2003	Georgia	34	(15)

Vano Nadiradze (born 23 February 1972) is a Georgian former rugby union international.

Nadiradze played rugby in France for over a decade with several clubs, including Béziers.

A lock, Nadiradze earned 34 caps for Georgia and was part of Georgia's 2001 European Nations Cup triumph. He retired after Georgia's historic appearance at the 2003 Rugby World Cup in Australia, where he featured in two matches.

Nadiradze's family is in the wine-making business. He was born in Gurjaani.

== See also ==
- List of Georgia national rugby union players
