= Pedro Carvalho (rugby union) =

Portuguese rugby union player

- Born: Pedro Carvalho; 29 June 1984 (age 42) Lisbon, Portugal
- Height: 1.85 m (6 ft 1 in)
- Weight: 87 kg (192 lb)

Rugby union career
- Position: Wing
Amateur team(s)
Years	Team	Apps	(Points)
- Grupo Desportivo Direito
International career
Years	Team	Apps	(Points)
2004–2007	Portugal	28	(25)
- Correct as of 2019-03-16

Pedro Carvalho Cabral (born 29 June 1984 in Lisbon) is a Portuguese rugby union player, who plays as a wing for Portuguese amateur side Grupo Desportivo Direito, and for Portugal's national side.

Carvalho made his debut for the national side on 20 November 2004, in a match against Ukraine, and had 28 caps, scoring 25 points. Carvalho was in the Portuguese squad for the 2007 World Cup, where he scored Portugal's first Rugby World Cup try in the opening match against Scotland.
