= Marius Tincu =

Romania international rugby union player

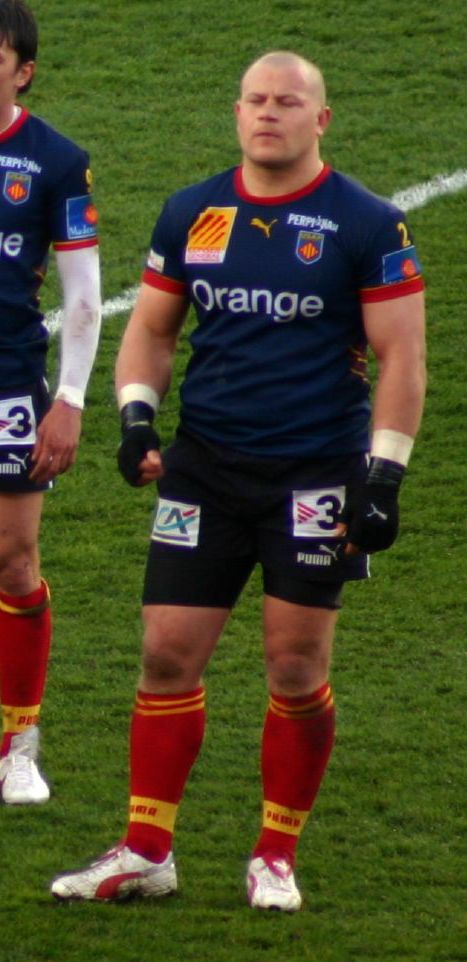
- Marius Tincu playing for Perpignan in 2006
- Born: Marius Vasilică Tincu; 7 April 1978 (age 48) Vanatori, Romania
- Height: 184 cm (6 ft 0 in)
- Weight: 120 kg (18 st 13 lb; 265 lb)

Rugby union career
- Position: Hooker
Senior career
Years	Team	Apps	(Points)
1996–2000	U Cluj		
2000–2002	Rouen NR		
2002	La Teste		
2002–2005	Section Paloise		
2005–2012	USA Perpignan		
International career
Years	Team	Apps	(Points)
2002–2012	Romania	53	(70)
- Correct as of 13 July 2019

Marius Vasilică Tincu (born 7 April 1978 in Vânători, Iași) is a Romanian former rugby union footballer. He played as a hooker. Since 2007, he has held dual French-Romanian citizenship.

He was first noticed in Romania, but soon moved to France, where he already played for Rouen, La Teste, Section Paloise (until 2005). He played for USA Perpignan, from the 2005-06 Top 14.

Tincu played his first game for Romania on 3 February 2002 against Portugal.

He played in four games at the 2007 Rugby World Cup, scoring three tries, in the games against Italy, Portugal and the New Zealand. He also competed at the 2011 Rugby World Cup.

== Honours ==
=== Club ===
==== USA Perpignan ====
- Top 14
  - Champion: 2009
  - Runner-up: 2010

=== International ===
Romania

- European Nations Cup (2): 2001–02, 2004–06

== Notes ==
Sporting positions
Preceded by (France) Thomas Lièvremont	Romania national rugby union coach (caretaker); 2019	Succeeded by (England) Andy Robinson
