= João Uva =

Portuguese rugby union footballer

- Born: 19 May 1980 (age 46) Ponte da Barca
- Height: 1.82 m (5 ft 11 1/2 in)
- Weight: 90 kg (198 lb; 14 st 2 lb)

Rugby union career
- Position: Flanker
International career
Years	Team	Apps	(Points)
2000–2009	Portugal	46	(15)

João Pedro Azevedo de Sousa Uva (born 19 May 1980 in Lisbon) is a former Portuguese rugby union footballer and a current coach. He played as a flanker.

He played for Belenenses, where he won the Portuguese Cup in 2000–01, the Portuguese SuperCup in 2001–02, and the National Championship title in 2002–03 and 2007/08. for Bandeirantes Rugby Club, of São Paulo, Brazil, since February 2011.

He had 46 caps for Portugal, from 2000 to 2009, and scored 3 tries, 15 points in aggregate.

He was one of five Belenenses players in the Portugal squad at the 2007 Rugby World Cup finals, and he played in all four games, without scoring.

He has been the coach of Belenenses since 2014/15.
