= Dave Pearson (rugby union) =

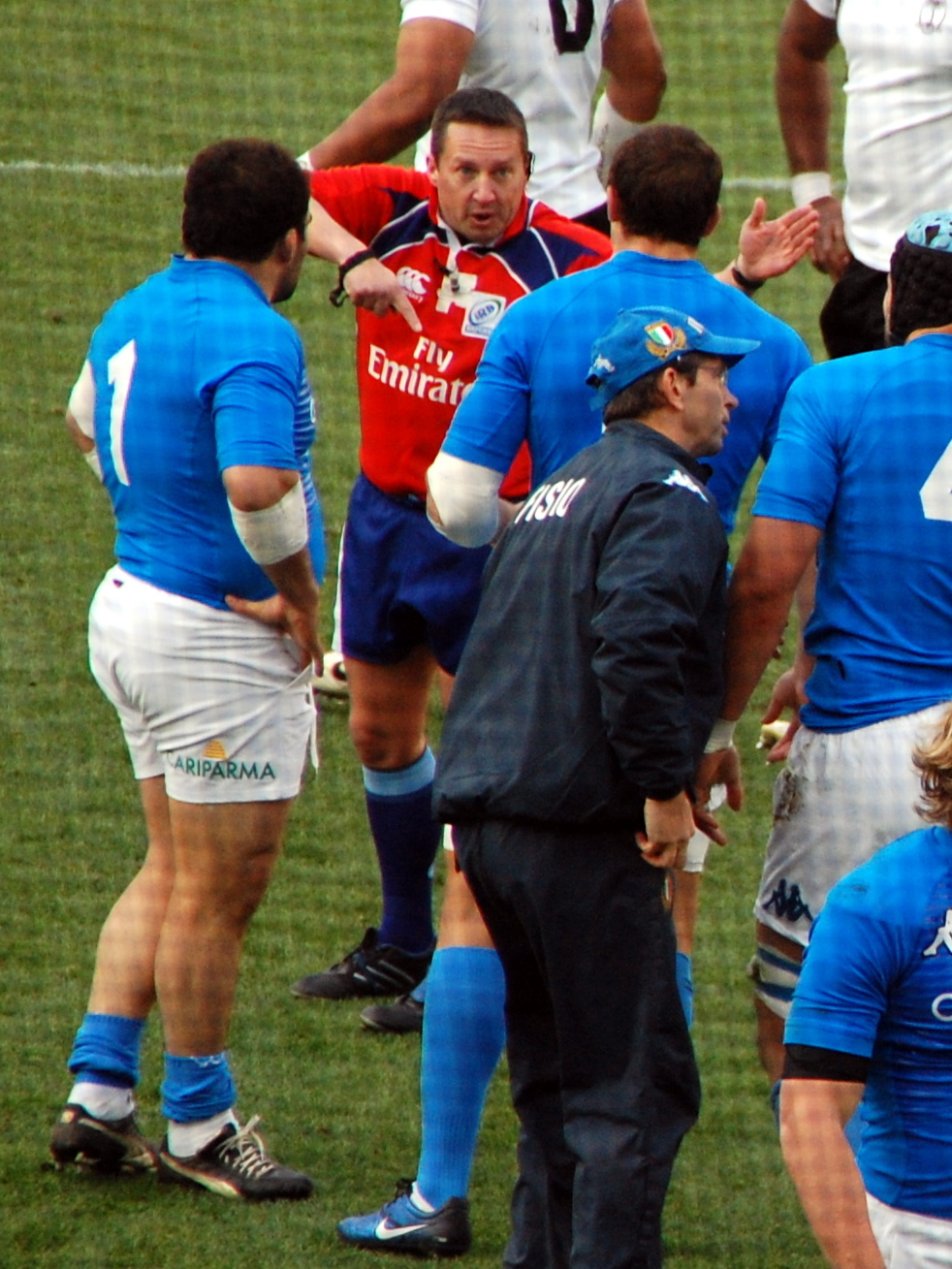
- Born: 9 August 1966 (age 60)

Rugby union career
Refereeing career
Years	Competition	Apps
2011	Rugby World Cup	
–	Test Matches	

Dave Pearson (born 9 August 1966) is an English former rugby union referee.

He was on the International Rugby Board's list of 17 international referees for the 2009/10 season. Pearson officiated the first test match between Argentina and Scotland in June 2010. David Pearson also refereed France versus Ireland in the 2011 six nations.

Since 2015, he has been the performance referee manager at the Scottish Rugby Union, where he is responsible for bringing through the next generation of Scottish and Northern English referees. He has mentored Mike Adamson, Holly Davidson, Sam Grove-White, and Ben Blain.
