= Marius Jonker =

South African rugby union referee (born 1968)

- Born: 19 June 1968 (age 58) Kimberley, Northern Cape

Rugby union career
Refereeing career
| Years | Competition | Apps |
| 2007 | 2007 Rugby World Cup | |
| 2005–2014 | Super Rugby | |
| 2005–2014 | Currie Cup | |
| 2006 | Pacific Nations Cup | |
| 2005 | U-21 World Championship | |
| 2004 | U-19 World Championship | |

Marius Jonker (born 19 June 1968 in Kimberley, Northern Cape) is a South African rugby union Television Match Official and former referee. He refereed at the 2007 Rugby World Cup in France, and regularly took charge of Super Rugby and Currie Cup matches. He also acted as a TMO at the 2019 Rugby World Cup in Japan, and will reprise this role at the 2023 Rugby World Cup in France.

== Career ==
Jonker began playing rugby at school. After matriculating at Hoerskool Gert Maritz in Pietermaritzburg, he joined the South African police force and played rugby as a fly-half for Pietermaritzburg Police. He also gained diplomas in Human Resources and Labour Relations. In September 1994, he moved to Richards Bay to take up employment with Bell Equipment, and played rugby for North Coast Rhinos of Empangeni in Zululand. He then played for Richards Bay, where he was the captain of the first XV and the club captain.

His refereeing career began by chance in 2000 when the referee failed to turn up for a local game in Richards Bay and Jonker took his place.

In 2004, Jonker refereed at the Under-19 World Championship, which was held in South Africa, and had charge of the final, between France and New Zealand. The following year he made his debut in the Super 12 and Currie Cup and also officiated at the Under-21 World Championship in Argentina, where he refereed a semi-final.

In August 2005, he made his international debut when he was in charge of a Rugby World Cup qualifying match between Uganda and Zimbabwe in Kampala. In June 2006 he refereed the Pacific Nations Cup match between the Junior all Blacks and Samoa and the mid-year international between Fiji and Italy. In November he was the referee for the Autumn International between Ireland and Australia, which was the last game to be played at the old Lansdowne Road ground. In March 2007 he took charge of his first Six Nations match, the Calcutta Cup match between Scotland and England. A month later, despite having handled only seven internationals, Jonker was named as one of three 'debutants' (the others were Wayne Barnes of England and Nigel Owens of Wales) in the 12-man panel of referees for the pool stages of the 2007 Rugby World Cup; he refereed three games, including Scotland v New Zealand, and was one of the touch judges for the semi-final between England and France.

Jonker was placed third on merit in South Africa's 12-man panel of national referees in November 2008, behind Jonathan Kaplan and Mark Lawrence. Together they and fourth-placed Craig Joubert were included in a merit panel of nine referees chosen by SANZAR to handle the majority of matches in the 2009 Super 14 regardless of nationality; he became the first South African to referee as a non-neutral in South Africa when he had charge of the first-round match between the Bulls and the Queensland Reds in Pretoria on 14 February 2009.

In addition to his refereeing activities, Jonker is Security Manager for the Bell Group. He and his wife, Belinda, have two children, Rynhardt, a professional rugby player for the Sharks and Sharks (Currie Cup), and Brenda.

Jonker retired from refereeing at the end of the 2014 season, with an international match between Namibia and Germany the last one in which he refereed.

Jonker took on the role of Television Match Official at the 2019 Rugby World Cup in Japan.

In 2021 he officiated as the television match official of the British and Irish lions tour of 2021. The tourists were unhappy with this decision.

He will officiate as a television match official for the forthcoming 2023 Rugby World Cup.
