= Marcello d'Orey =

Portuguese rugby union player

- Born: 3 March 1976 (age 50) Rio de Janeiro, Brazil
- Height: 1.96 m (6 ft 5 in)
- Weight: 127 kg (280 lb; 20.0 st)

Rugby union career
- Position: Lock
International career
Years	Team	Apps	(Points)
1996–2007	Portugal	60	(25)

Marcello d’Orey de Araújo Dias (born Rio de Janeiro, Brazil, 7 March 1976) is a Portuguese lawyer and former rugby union player.

His position in the field is as a lock, but he has also played as number 8.

He played his entire career in CDUP, where he won 2 National Cups, in 2002/2003 and 2005/2006.

D'Orey is one of the most capped Portuguese rugby footballers, with 60 caps and 5 tries, 25 points in aggregate, since his debut, on 10 November 1996, in a 20–31 loss to Spain.

D'Orey was selected for the squad that entered the 2007 Rugby World Cup. He was injured in his only presence, at the loss to New Zealand (13–108), in the first time the two teams played, missing the rest of the tournament. That would be his last game for the National Team.
