= Tomaz Morais =

Portuguese rugby union player and coach

- Born: April 6, 1970 (age 56) Lobito, Angola
- Notable relative: Frederico Morais

Rugby union career
- Position: Centre
International career
Years	Team	Apps	(Points)
1991-1995	Portugal	20	(5)
Coaching career
- Years: Team
- 2001-2010: Portugal

Tomaz Eduardo Carvalho Morais (born 6 April 1970 in Lobito, Angola) is a Portuguese rugby union coach and a former player.

== Life and career ==
The son of Portuguese settlers in Angola, Morais moved to Portugal following the 25 April 1974 revolution. He went on to become a Physical Education teacher and a rugby union player, playing as a centre for Cascais. He took some time off from the sport because of his studies, but later returned to play for Direito. He won 6 titles of the National Championship and 2 Iberian Cups.

Morais won 20 caps for Portugal national rugby union team, scoring a try, from 1991 to 1995. He had to retire from rugby in 1996 due to a serious injury. He took the opportunity to start a career as a rugby coach, first at Direito.

=== National Team Coach ===
He became coach of the Portuguese national team in September 2001, and, after a hard work, went to win the European Nations Cup, for the first time, in 2004. The same year, he was nominated for the award of "Coach of the Year" by the IRB. In 2007, he led Portugal to their first Rugby World Cup finals, after beating Uruguay over two legs. At the 2007 Rugby World Cup finals, Portugal lost all four of their games, but scored in all of them, including a try in each one, and earned a bonus point in the 14-10 loss to Romania.

He missed the qualification for the repechage to the 2011 Rugby World Cup, by finishing in 4th place. He left office as the National Team coach in March 2010 and was replaced by New Zealand Errol Brain in September. He took office in March 2010 as technical officer of the Portuguese Rugby Federation.

He co-wrote the 2006 book Compromisso: Nunca Desistir ("A Commitment: Never Give Up") with the journalist Carlos Mendonça.

Awards
Preceded by Sérgio Santos; João Ganço	Portuguese Coach of the Year; 2007; 2010	Succeeded by João Ganço; Ilídio Vale
Sporting positions
Preceded by (New Zealand) Evan Crawford	Portugal National Rugby Union Coach; 2001–2010	Succeeded by (New Zealand) Errol Brain
