= 2007 Rugby World Cup =

6th Rugby World Cup

French: Coupe du monde de rugby 2007

Tournament details
- Host nation: France
- Venue: 12 (in 12 host cities)
- Dates: 7 September – 20 October (44 days)
- No. of nations: 20 (91 qualifying)

Final positions
- Champions: South Africa (2nd title)
- Runner-up: England
- Third place: Argentina

Tournament statistics
- Matches played: 48
- Attendance: 2,265,182 (47,191 per match)
- Top scorer(s): (South Africa) Percy Montgomery (105)
- Most tries: (South Africa) Bryan Habana (8)

The 2007 Rugby World Cup (French: Coupe du monde de rugby 2007) was the sixth Rugby World Cup, a quadrennial international rugby union competition organised by the International Rugby Board. Twenty nations competed for the Webb Ellis Cup in the tournament, which was hosted by France from 7 September to 20 October. France won the hosting rights in 2003, beating a bid from England. The competition consisted of 48 matches over 44 days; 42 matches were played in 10 cities throughout France, as well as four in Cardiff, Wales, and two in Edinburgh, Scotland.

The eight quarter-finalists from 2003 were granted automatic qualification, while 12 other nations gained entry through the regional qualifying competitions that began in 2004 – of them, Portugal was the only World Cup debutant. The top three nations from each pool at the end of the pool stage qualified automatically for the 2011 World Cup.

The competition opened with a match between hosts France and Argentina on 7 September at the Stade de France in Saint-Denis, outside Paris. The stadium was also the venue of the final, played between England and South Africa on 20 October, which South Africa won 15–6 to win their second World Cup title.

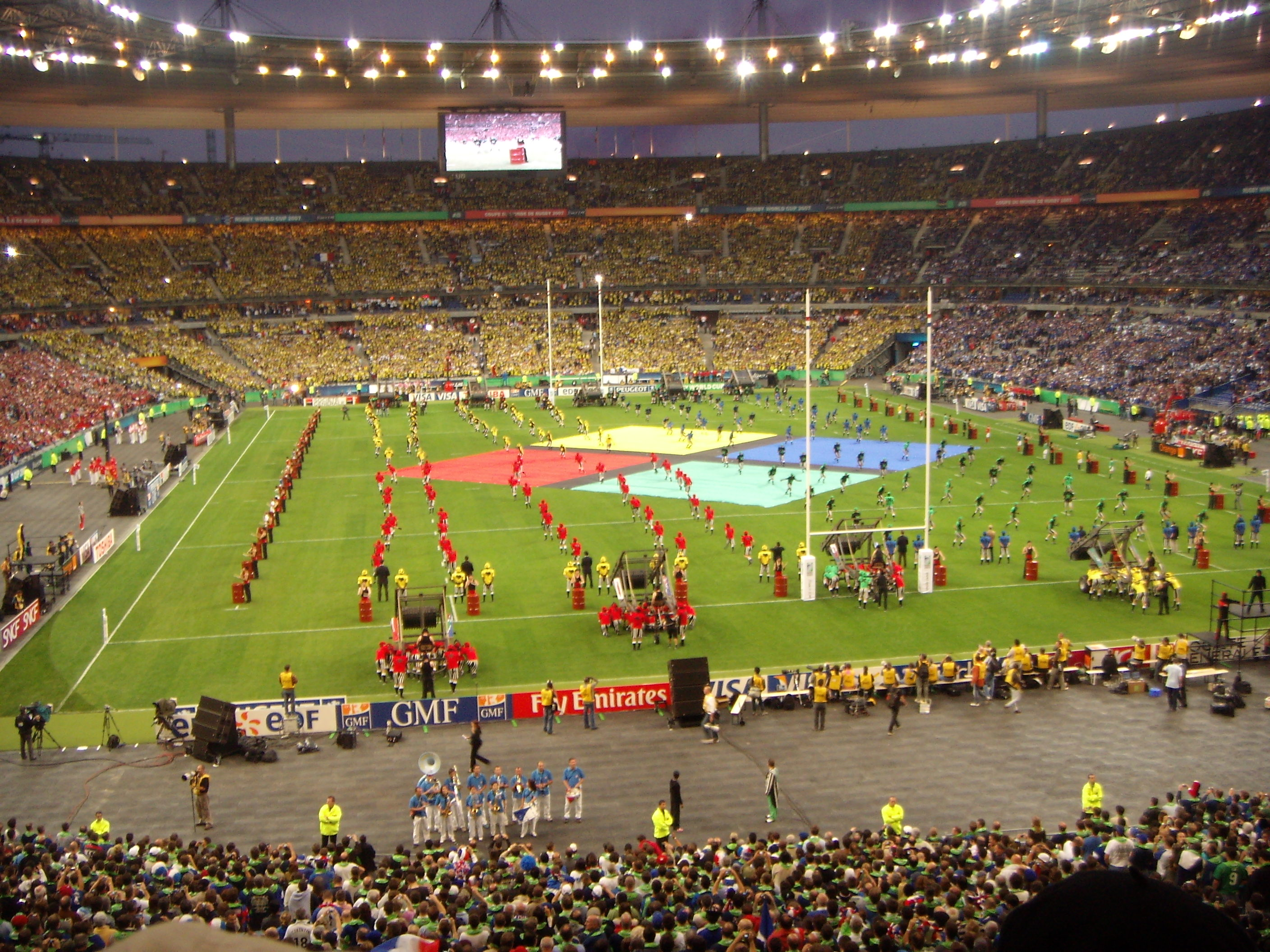
The opening ceremony of the 2007 Rugby World Cup

== Bids ==
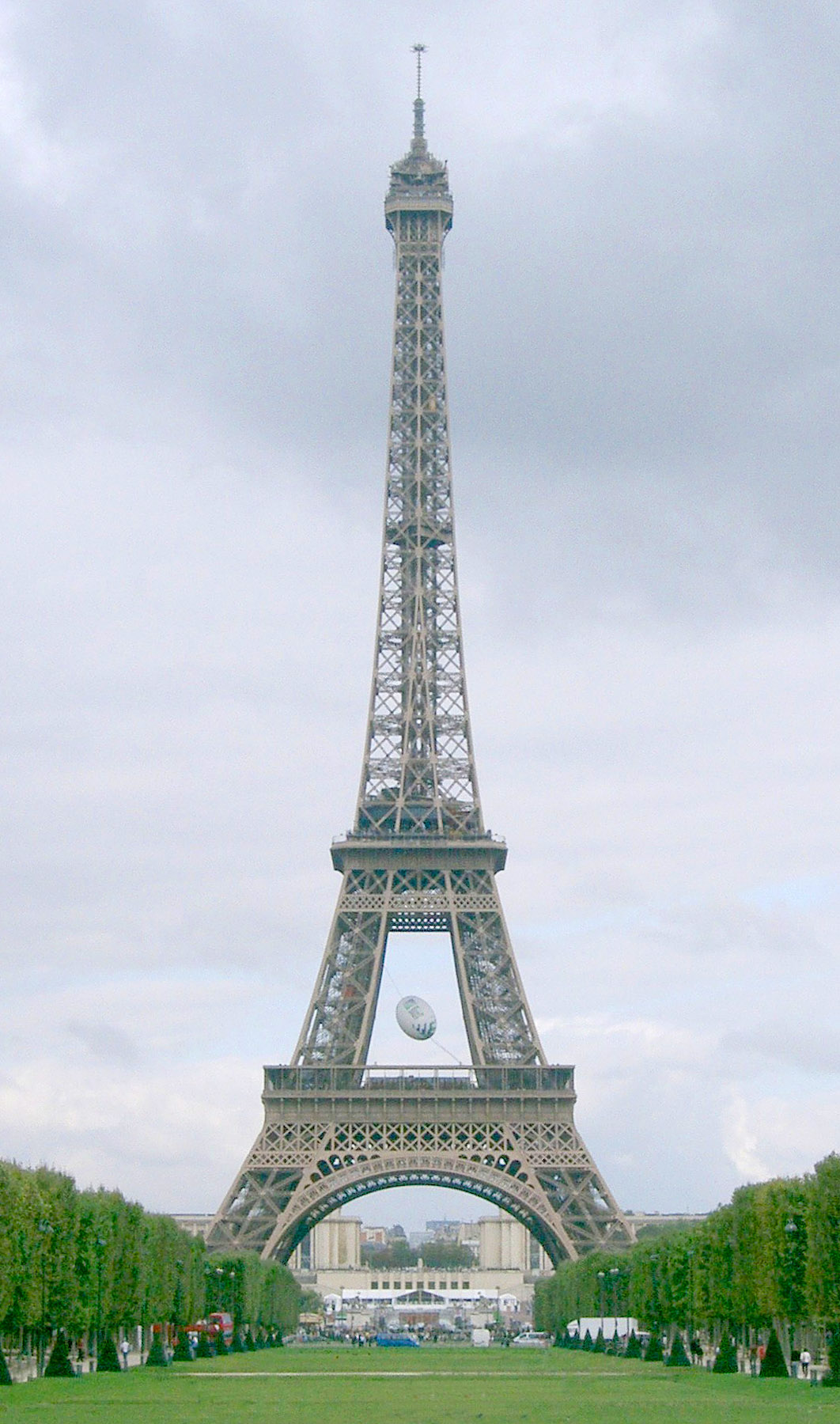
The Eiffel Tower in Paris decorated with a giant rugby ball for the 2007 Rugby World Cup.

Both England and France bid to host the tournament. The tender document for the 2007 bidding process was due out on 31 October 2001. Both England and France were invited to re-submit their plans. The International Rugby Board (IRB) stated that both countries must comply with tender document terms in one bid, but in their second option, could propose alternative ideas. The IRB said "England's original proposal contained three plans for hosting the tournament with a traditional, new and hybrid format all on offer... The French bid, while complying with the tender document in all other respects, fell outside one of the 'windows' in which the IRB wanted to stage an event". England's bids included a two-tier tournament and altering the structure of the qualifying tournament and France had a bid in September/October.

It was announced in April 2003 that France had won the right to host the tournament. The tournament was moved to the proposed September–October dates with the tournament structure remaining as it was. It was also announced that ten French cities would be hosting games, with the final at the Stade de France. French Prime Minister Jean-Pierre Raffarin said that "this decision illustrates the qualities of our country and its capacity to host major sporting events...This World Cup will be the opportunity to showcase the regions of France where the wonderful sport of rugby is deeply rooted". French Sports Minister Jean-François Lamour said that "The organisation of this World Cup will shine over all of France because ten French towns have the privilege of organising matches and to be in the world's spotlight." French cities to host games were Bordeaux, Lens, Lyon, Marseille, Montpellier, Nantes, St. Etienne, Toulouse and Paris, and it was also announced that the final would be at the Stade de France in Saint-Denis.

== Qualifying ==
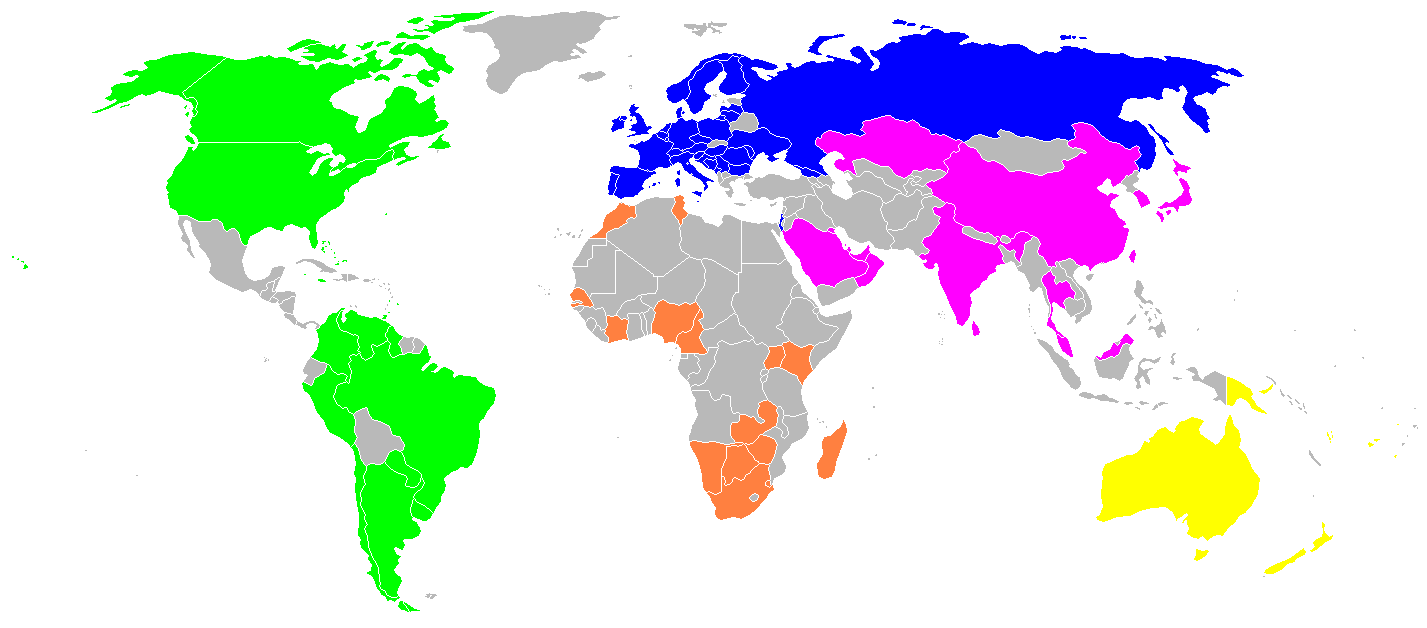
Nations participating in qualifying competition and those that have qualified automatically; Asia (purple), Africa (orange), Americas (green), Europe (blue) and Oceania (yellow). In total, over 90 nations took part.

The eight quarter-finalists from the 2003 World Cup all received automatic entry, with the other 12 nations coming from qualifying series around the world. Ten of the 20 positions available in the tournament were filled by regional qualifiers, with an additional two being filled by repechage qualification. The qualifying tournament was divided into five regional groups; Africa, Americas, Asia, Europe and Oceania. Qualifying matches began in 2004 and were completed in early 2007. Including the automatic qualifiers, over 90 nations were in qualifying contention for the final tournament.

In July 2005, both Samoa and Fiji were confirmed as the qualifiers from Oceania, as Oceania 1 and 2 respectively. In July of the following year, Argentina qualified as Americas 1 by defeating Uruguay 26–0 in Buenos Aires. Canada qualified as Americas 2 in August by defeating the United States 56–7 in Newfoundland. The United States went on to qualify as Americas 3 after beating Uruguay in a two-legged tie in early October. That month also saw Italy qualify as Europe 1 after defeating Russia 67–7 in Moscow, reaching the first place in its qualifying group; Romania defeated Spain 43–20 in Madrid, and also qualified for the World Cup as Europe 2.

Namibia qualified for their third consecutive World Cup after they earned their spot in France by defeating Morocco over two legs in November. In late 2006, it was announced that the IRB had withdrawn Colombo as the venue of the final Asian qualifying tournament due to security problems. Japan won the only Asian allocation after the tournament was moved to Hong Kong. Georgia was 14 points the better of Portugal over two legs to claim the last European place. Tonga qualified through repechage after defeating Korea. The final spot went to Portugal, joining Pool C after beating Uruguay 24–23 on aggregate. Portugal's qualification was the only change in the 20-team roster from the 2003 World Cup, replacing Uruguay, becoming the only wholly amateur team to qualify.

| Africa | Americas | Europe | Oceania/Asia |
|---|---|---|---|
| Namibia (Africa); South Africa | Argentina (Americas 1); Canada (Americas 2); United States (Americas 3) | England; France; Ireland; Italy (Europe 1); Romania (Europe 2); Scotland; Georgia (Europe 3); Portugal (Repechage 1); Wales | Australia; Fiji (Oceania 2); New Zealand; Samoa (Oceania 1); Tonga (Repechage 2); Japan (Asia) |

== Venues ==
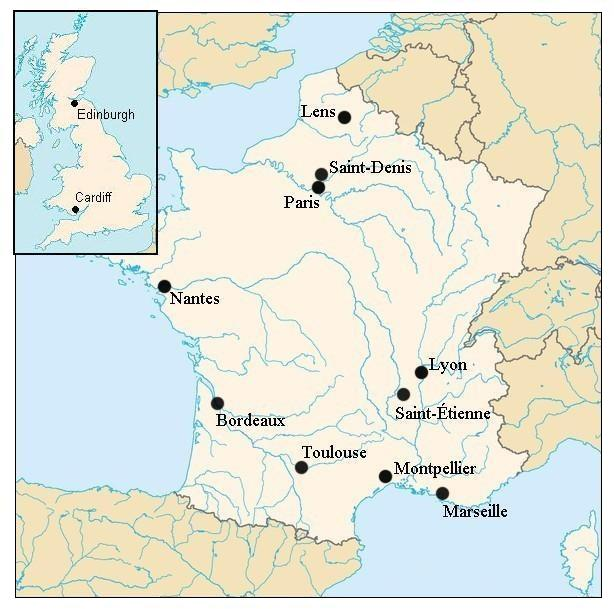
The 2007 World Cup was hosted by France, with additional venues at Edinburgh and Cardiff.

France won the right to host the 2007 World Cup in 2003, Then it was announced that 6 games would be held abroad, at the request of their neighbouring countries. Four matches would be held in Wales, at Cardiff's 74,500-seat Millennium Stadium: two Pool B games involving Wales, the match between Fiji and Canada and a quarter-final. Ireland was to have hosted matches at Lansdowne Road, Dublin, but opted out because the stadium was being redeveloped.

Two of Scotland's Pool C matches were played at Murrayfield Stadium in Scotland. The Scottish Rugby Union was reportedly having doubts in early 2006 about hosting these games and whether Scotland would generate enough market demand, but confirmed in April 2006 that the games would be played at Murrayfield. In the end, the Scotland v. New Zealand match failed to sell out, and the stadium was less than half-full for the Scotland v. Romania match.

There was a substantial increase in the overall capacity of stadiums compared to the 2003 Rugby World Cup – the smallest venue at the 2007 tournament could seat 33,900 people. The French venues were the same as those used for the 1998 FIFA World Cup. Around 6,000 volunteers helped to organise the competition.

Although the 2007 tournament was the first to be hosted primarily by France, a number of matches during the 1991 and 1999 tournaments were played in France. In 1991, matches in Pool D (which included France) were played in Béziers, Bayonne, Grenoble, Toulouse, Brive and Agen, while Parc des Princes and Stadium Lille-Metropole each hosted a quarter-final. Similarly, in 1999, fixtures in Pool C (which included France) were played in Béziers, Bordeaux and Toulouse, Stade Félix-Bollaert was the venue for one of the quarter-final play-offs, and the Stade de France hosted a quarter-final.

| (France) Saint-Denis | (Wales) Cardiff | (Scotland) Edinburgh | (France) Marseille |
|---|---|---|---|
| Stade de France | Millennium Stadium | Murrayfield | Stade Vélodrome |
| Capacity: 80,000 | Capacity: 74,500 | Capacity: 67,144 | Capacity: 59,500 |
| (France) Paris | (France) Lens | (France) Lyon | (France) Nantes |
| Parc des Princes | Stade Félix-Bollaert | Stade de Gerland | Stade de la Beaujoire |
| Capacity: 47,870 | Capacity: 41,400 | Capacity: 41,100 | Capacity: 38,100 |
| (France) Toulouse | (France) Saint-Étienne | (France) Bordeaux | (France) Montpellier |
| Stadium de Toulouse | Stade Geoffroy-Guichard | Stade Chaban-Delmas | Stade de la Mosson |
| Capacity: 35,700 | Capacity: 35,650 | Capacity: 34,440 | Capacity: 33,900 |

== Tickets and sponsorship ==
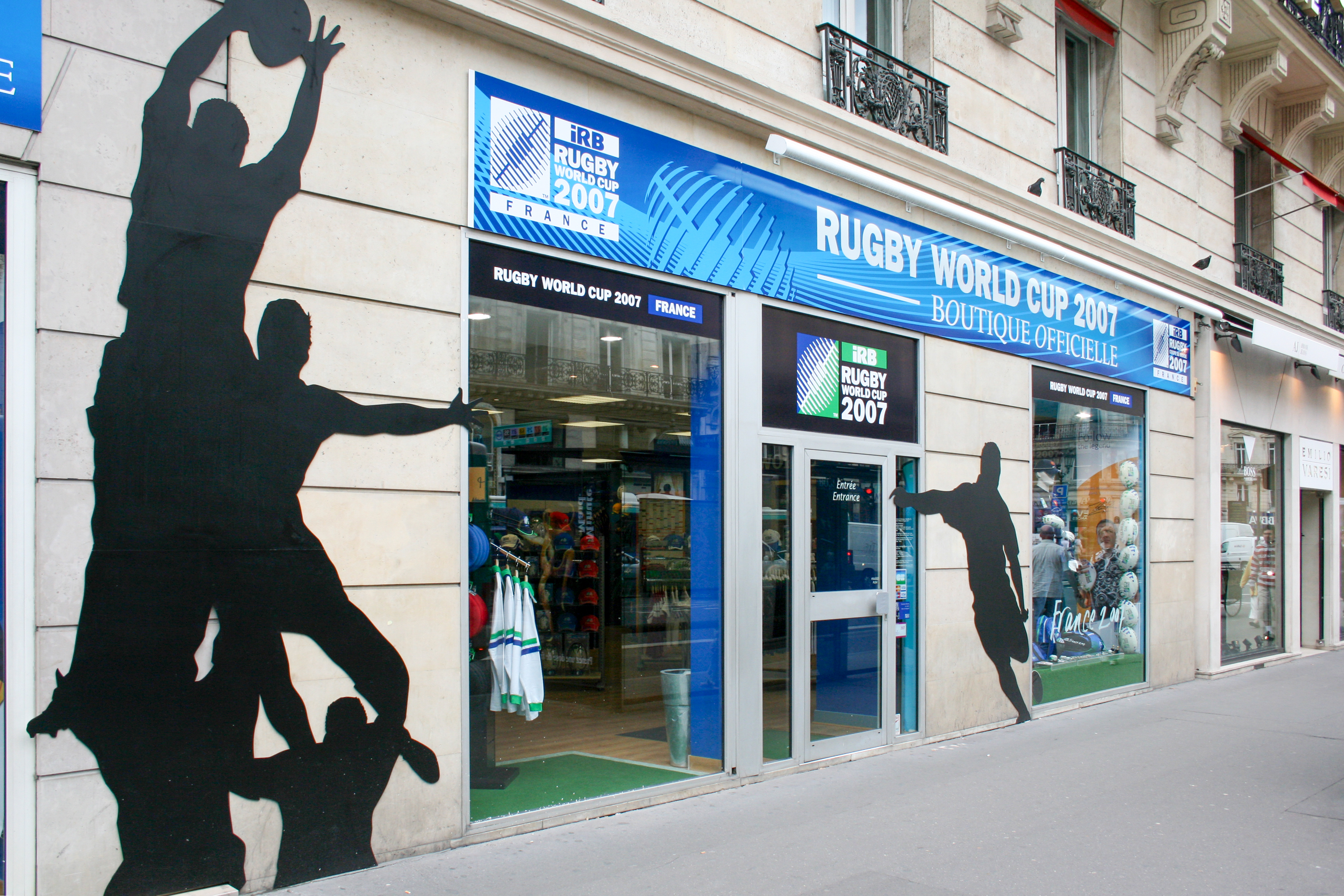
The official Rugby World Cup shop in Paris

Ticket sales for the Rugby World Cup were broken up into three phases. The first phase was released in November 2005, when members of the European rugby community, such as officials, players and so on were given the opportunity for various packages. Upon the release of the second phase ticketing scheme, more than 100,000 tickets were sold in the first ten hours of release. The remaining tickets – individual tickets and tickets to the semi-finals – were released in phase three in November 2006. In June 2007, it was announced that 2 million of the 2.4 million tickets had been sold in advance of the tournament.

The Worldwide partners for the tournament were Société Générale, GMF, Électricité de France, Peugeot, Visa and SNCF, and official sponsors include Heineken, Vediorbis, Capgemini, Orange, Toshiba and Emirates. Gilbert provided the tournament balls, with the Gilbert Synergie match ball used throughout the tournament. This continued Gilbert's involvement with the World Cup, the company having provided the Barbarian (1995), Revolution (1999) and Xact (2003) balls in the past. Along with Gilbert, the official suppliers were Adidas, Coca-Cola, Clifford Chance, Goodyear and McDonald's. The host broadcaster for the event was TF1.

== Squads ==
Each country was allowed a squad of 30 players for the tournament. These squads were to be submitted to the International Rugby Board by a deadline of 14 August 2007. Once the squad was submitted a player could be replaced if injured, but would not be allowed to return to the squad.

== Match officials ==
The 2007 Rugby World Cup officials were appointed in late-April 2007, with 12 referees and 13 touch judges being chosen to officiate during the pool stage. In the knockout stage the 12 referees also acted as touch judges, with referee appointments being based on performance from previous matches and selection for neutrality. Referees came from seven different nationalities and three of them made their Rugby World Cup debut. The touch judges came from 10 countries. Tony Spreadbury of England officiated the opening game between France and Argentina at the Stade de France and Irishman Alain Rolland refereed the final.

Referees
| Country | Name |
|---|---|
| Australia | Stuart Dickinson |
| England | Wayne Barnes |
| England | Tony Spreadbury |
| England | Chris White |
| France | Joël Jutge |
| Ireland | Alan Lewis |
| Ireland | Alain Rolland |
| New Zealand | Paul Honiss |
| New Zealand | Steve Walsh |
| South Africa | Marius Jonker |
| South Africa | Jonathan Kaplan |
| Wales | Nigel Owens |

Touch judges
| Country | Name |
|---|---|
| Argentina | Federico Cuesta |
| Australia | Paul Marks |
| England | Dave Pearson |
| France | Christophe Berdos |
| Italy | Carlo Damasco |
| Ireland | Simon McDowell |
| New Zealand | Lyndon Bray |
| New Zealand | Kelvin Deaker |
| New Zealand | Bryce Lawrence |
| Scotland | Malcolm Changleng |
| South Africa | Craig Joubert |
| South Africa | Mark Lawrence |
| Wales | Hugh Watkins |

== Pool format ==
The competition was contested over 44 days between 20 different nations, over 48 fixtures. The tournament began on 7 September at the Stade de France with a match between the host nation, France, and Argentina. The tournament culminated at the same venue on 20 October for the final between England and South Africa.

=== Pool stage ===
| Pool A | Pool B | Pool C | Pool D |
|---|---|---|---|
| England; Samoa; South Africa; Tonga; United States | Australia; Canada; Fiji; Japan; Wales | Italy; New Zealand; Portugal; Romania; Scotland | Argentina; France; Georgia; Ireland; Namibia |

Classification within each pool was based on the following scoring system:

- four match points for a win;
- two for a draw;
- zero for a loss.

Bonus points, contributing to a team's cumulative match-point score, were awarded in each of the following instances (one match point for each event):

- a team scores four or more tries (regardless of the match result);
- a team loses by seven points (a converted try) or fewer.

At the end of the pool stage, teams were ranked from first to fifth based on cumulative match points, with the top two nations proceeding to the quarter-finals.

Tie-breaking criteria

If at the completion of the pool phase two or more Teams were level on Match points, then the following criteria would have been used in the following order until one of the Teams could be determined as the higher ranked:

i. The winner of the Match in which the two tied Teams have played each other shall be the higher ranked;
ii. The Team which has the best difference between points scored for and points scored against in all its pool Matches shall be the higher ranked;
iii. The Team which has the best difference between tries scored for and tries scored against in all its pool Matches shall be the higher ranked;
iv. The Team which has scored most points in all its pool Matches shall be the higher ranked;
v. The Team which has scored most tries in all its pool Matches shall be the higher ranked;
vi. Should the tie be unresolved at the conclusion of steps (i) through (v), the Team that is higher ranked in the updated Official IRB World Rankings on 1 October 2007.

By elevating head-to-head results (rule i) above points difference (rule ii), a notable difference is created to other sports competitions, in which points difference usually determines rank for teams with the same number of match points (table points). These rules allowed the winners of Pools A, B and C to be determined by the results of the third pool matches on the weekend of 22 and 23 September. Although other teams could theoretically draw level on table points with South Africa, Australia and New Zealand and exceed their points differences at the end of the pool stages, head-to-head results by that time ensured these teams could be declared winners of their respective pools, with a match to spare. This also illustrates the fact that the pool tables do not tell the whole story.

=== Knockout stage ===
From this stage onwards, the tournament adopted a knockout format comprising eight fixtures: four quarter-finals, two semi-finals, a bronze medal match, and the final. The winner and runner-up from each of the four pools advanced to the quarter-finals. Pool winners were drawn against opposite pool runners-up in the quarter-finals, e.g. the winner of Pool A faced the runner up of Pool B, and the winner of Pool B faced the runner-up of Pool A.

In the knockout stage, if a match resulted in a draw after 80 minutes of normal play, further periods would be played to determine an outright winner. Initially, there would be two periods of extra time, 10 minutes each way; if there was no winner after this, then play would proceed to a single 10-minute period of "sudden death". If the contest was unresolved after a total 110 minutes of open play, the winner would be determined by a placekicking competition.

=== Effect on 2011 qualification ===
In a change from the format of the previous tournament, the top three teams in each pool would qualify for the 2011 Rugby World Cup in New Zealand; previously, only the eight quarter-finalists gained an automatic place in the following tournament.

== Pool stage ==
Qualified for the quarter-finals
Eliminated, automatic qualification for RWC 2011

All times French time (UTC+2)

=== Pool A ===
| Pos | Team | Pld | W | D | L | PF | PA | PD | B | Pts |
|---|---|---|---|---|---|---|---|---|---|---|
| 1 | South Africa | 4 | 4 | 0 | 0 | 189 | 47 | +142 | 3 | 19 |
| 2 | England | 4 | 3 | 0 | 1 | 108 | 88 | +20 | 2 | 14 |
| 3 | Tonga | 4 | 2 | 0 | 2 | 89 | 96 | −7 | 1 | 9 |
| 4 | Samoa | 4 | 1 | 0 | 3 | 69 | 143 | −74 | 1 | 5 |
| 5 | United States | 4 | 0 | 0 | 4 | 61 | 142 | −81 | 1 | 1 |

| 8 September 2007 | England | 28–10 | United States | Stade Félix Bollaert, Lens |
| 9 September 2007 | South Africa | 59–7 | Samoa | Parc des Princes, Paris |
| 12 September 2007 | United States | 15–25 | Tonga | Stade de la Mosson, Montpellier |
| 14 September 2007 | England | 0–36 | South Africa | Stade de France, Saint-Denis |
| 16 September 2007 | Samoa | 15–19 | Tonga | Stade de la Mosson, Montpellier |
| 22 September 2007 | South Africa | 30–25 | Tonga | Stade Félix Bollaert, Lens |
| 22 September 2007 | England | 44–22 | Samoa | Stade de la Beaujoire, Nantes |
| 26 September 2007 | Samoa | 25–21 | United States | Stade Geoffroy-Guichard, Saint-Étienne |
| 28 September 2007 | England | 36–20 | Tonga | Parc des Princes, Paris |
| 30 September 2007 | South Africa | 64–15 | United States | Stade de la Mosson, Montpellier |

=== Pool B ===
| Pos | Team | Pld | W | D | L | PF | PA | PD | B | Pts |
|---|---|---|---|---|---|---|---|---|---|---|
| 1 | Australia | 4 | 4 | 0 | 0 | 215 | 41 | +174 | 4 | 20 |
| 2 | Fiji | 4 | 3 | 0 | 1 | 114 | 136 | −22 | 3 | 15 |
| 3 | Wales | 4 | 2 | 0 | 2 | 168 | 105 | +63 | 4 | 12 |
| 4 | Japan | 4 | 0 | 1 | 3 | 64 | 210 | −146 | 1 | 3 |
| 5 | Canada | 4 | 0 | 1 | 3 | 51 | 120 | −69 | 0 | 2 |

| 8 September 2007 | Australia | 91–3 | Japan | Stade de Gerland, Lyon |
| 9 September 2007 | Wales | 42–17 | Canada | Stade de la Beaujoire, Nantes |
| 12 September 2007 | Japan | 31–35 | Fiji | Stadium de Toulouse, Toulouse |
| 15 September 2007 | Wales | 20–32 | Australia | Millennium Stadium, Cardiff |
| 16 September 2007 | Fiji | 29–16 | Canada | Millennium Stadium, Cardiff |
| 20 September 2007 | Wales | 72–18 | Japan | Millennium Stadium, Cardiff |
| 23 September 2007 | Australia | 55–12 | Fiji | Stade de la Mosson, Montpellier |
| 25 September 2007 | Canada | 12–12 | Japan | Stade Chaban-Delmas, Bordeaux |
| 29 September 2007 | Australia | 37–6 | Canada | Stade Chaban-Delmas, Bordeaux |
| 29 September 2007 | Wales | 34–38 | Fiji | Stade de la Beaujoire, Nantes |

=== Pool C ===
| Pos | Team | Pld | W | D | L | PF | PA | PD | B | Pts |
|---|---|---|---|---|---|---|---|---|---|---|
| 1 | New Zealand | 4 | 4 | 0 | 0 | 309 | 35 | +274 | 4 | 20 |
| 2 | Scotland | 4 | 3 | 0 | 1 | 116 | 66 | +50 | 2 | 14 |
| 3 | Italy | 4 | 2 | 0 | 2 | 85 | 117 | −32 | 1 | 9 |
| 4 | Romania | 4 | 1 | 0 | 3 | 40 | 161 | −121 | 1 | 5 |
| 5 | Portugal | 4 | 0 | 0 | 4 | 38 | 209 | −171 | 1 | 1 |

| 8 September 2007 | New Zealand | 76–14 | Italy | Stade Vélodrome, Marseille |
| 9 September 2007 | Scotland | 56–10 | Portugal | Stade Geoffroy-Guichard, Saint-Étienne |
| 12 September 2007 | Italy | 24–18 | Romania | Stade Vélodrome, Marseille |
| 15 September 2007 | New Zealand | 108–13 | Portugal | Stade de Gerland, Lyon |
| 18 September 2007 | Scotland | 42–0 | Romania | Murrayfield Stadium, Edinburgh |
| 19 September 2007 | Italy | 31–5 | Portugal | Parc des Princes, Paris |
| 23 September 2007 | Scotland | 0–40 | New Zealand | Murrayfield Stadium, Edinburgh |
| 25 September 2007 | Romania | 14–10 | Portugal | Stadium de Toulouse, Toulouse |
| 29 September 2007 | New Zealand | 85–8 | Romania | Stadium de Toulouse, Toulouse |
| 29 September 2007 | Scotland | 18–16 | Italy | Stade Geoffroy-Guichard, Saint-Étienne |

=== Pool D ===
| Pos | Team | Pld | W | D | L | PF | PA | PD | B | Pts |
|---|---|---|---|---|---|---|---|---|---|---|
| 1 | Argentina | 4 | 4 | 0 | 0 | 143 | 33 | +110 | 2 | 18 |
| 2 | France | 4 | 3 | 0 | 1 | 188 | 37 | +151 | 3 | 15 |
| 3 | Ireland | 4 | 2 | 0 | 2 | 64 | 82 | −18 | 1 | 9 |
| 4 | Georgia | 4 | 1 | 0 | 3 | 50 | 111 | −61 | 1 | 5 |
| 5 | Namibia | 4 | 0 | 0 | 4 | 30 | 212 | −182 | 0 | 0 |

| 7 September 2007 | France | 12–17 | Argentina | Stade de France, Saint-Denis |
| 9 September 2007 | Ireland | 32–17 | Namibia | Stade Chaban-Delmas, Bordeaux |
| 11 September 2007 | Argentina | 33–3 | Georgia | Stade de Gerland, Lyon |
| 15 September 2007 | Ireland | 14–10 | Georgia | Stade Chaban-Delmas, Bordeaux |
| 16 September 2007 | France | 87–10 | Namibia | Stadium de Toulouse, Toulouse |
| 21 September 2007 | France | 25–3 | Ireland | Stade de France, Saint-Denis |
| 22 September 2007 | Argentina | 63–3 | Namibia | Stade Vélodrome, Marseille |
| 26 September 2007 | Georgia | 30–0 | Namibia | Stade Félix Bollaert, Lens |
| 30 September 2007 | France | 64–7 | Georgia | Stade Vélodrome, Marseille |
| 30 September 2007 | Ireland | 15–30 | Argentina | Parc des Princes, Paris |

== Knockout stage ==
Quarter-finals
6 October – Marseille
Australia | 10
England | 12
6 October – Cardiff
New Zealand | 18
France | 20
7 October – Marseille
South Africa | 37
Fiji | 20
7 October – Saint-Denis
Argentina | 19
Scotland | 13

Semi-finals
13 October – Saint-Denis
England | 14
France | 9
14 October – Saint-Denis
South Africa | 37
Argentina | 13

Final
20 October – Saint-Denis
England | 6
South Africa | 15
Bronze final
19 October – Paris
France | 10
Argentina | 34

=== Quarter-finals ===
6 October 2007
15:00

| Australia | 10–12 | England |
| Try: Tuqiri 33' c Con: Mortlock (1/1); Pen: Mortlock (1/4) 6' | Report | Pen: Wilkinson (4/7) 22', 25', 51', 59' |

Stade Vélodrome, Marseille
Attendance: 59,102
Referee: Alain Rolland (Ireland)

6 October 2007
21:00

| New Zealand | 18–20 | France |
| Try: McAlister 17' c So'oialo 63' m Con: Carter (1/1); Pen: Carter (2/2) 14', 31' | Report | Try: Dusautoir 54' c Jauzion 69' c Con: Beauxis (1/1); Élissalde (1/1); Pen: Beauxis (2/3) 40+', 46' |

Millennium Stadium, Cardiff
Attendance: 71,669
Referee: Wayne Barnes (England)

7 October 2007
15:00

| South Africa | 37–20 | Fiji |
| Try: Fourie 13' m Smit 35' m Pietersen 51' c Smith 70' c James 80' c Con: Montgomery (3/5); Pen: Steyn (1/1) 8'; Montgomery (1/2) 63' | Report | Try: Delasau 57' c Bobo 59' c Con: Bai (2/2); Pen: Bai (2/2) 26', 44' |

Stade Vélodrome, Marseille
Attendance: 55,943
Referee: Alan Lewis (Ireland)

7 October 2007
21:00

| Argentina | 19–13 | Scotland |
| Try: Longo Elía 33' c Con: F. Contepomi (1/1); Pen: F. Contepomi (3/4) 23', 29', 43'; Drop: Hernández (1/4) 54' | Report | Try: Cusiter 63' c Con: Paterson (1/1); Pen: Parks (1/2) 16'; Paterson (1/1) 38' |

Stade de France, Saint-Denis
Attendance: 76,866
Referee: Joël Jutge (France)

=== Semi-finals ===
13 October 2007
21:00

| England | 14–9 | France |
| Try: Lewsey 2' m Pen: Wilkinson (2/3) 47', 75'; Drop: Wilkinson (1/4) 78' | Report | Pen: Beauxis (3/3) 8', 18', 44' |

Stade de France, Saint-Denis
Attendance: 80,283
Referee: Jonathan Kaplan (South Africa)

14 October 2007
21:00

| South Africa | 37–13 | Argentina |
| Try: du Preez 7' c Habana (2) 32' c, 76' c Rossouw 40' c Con: Montgomery (4/4); Pen: Montgomery (3/3) 17', 71', 75' | Report | Try: M. Contepomi 45' c Con: F. Contepomi (1/1); Pen: F. Contepomi (2/4) 15', 30' |

Stade de France, Saint-Denis
Attendance: 77,055
Referee: Steve Walsh (Australia)

=== Bronze final ===
19 October 2007
21:00

| France | 10–34 | Argentina |
| Try: Poitrenaud 69' c Con: Beauxis (1/1); Pen: Élissalde (1/1) 18' | Report | Try: F. Contepomi (2) 28' c, 77' c Hasan 32' c Aramburú 53' m Corleto 65' m Con: F. Contepomi (3/5); Pen: F. Contepomi (1/1) 21' |

Parc des Princes, Paris
Attendance: 45,958
Referee: Paul Honiss (New Zealand)

=== Final ===
20 October 2007
21:00

| England | 6–15 | South Africa |
| Pen: Wilkinson (2/2) 13', 44' | Report | Pen: Montgomery (4/4) 7', 16', 40', 51'; Steyn (1/2) 62' |

Stade de France, Saint-Denis
Attendance: 80,430
Referee: Alain Rolland (Ireland)

== Statistics ==
The tournament's top point scorer was South African Percy Montgomery, who scored 105 points. Bryan Habana scored the most tries, eight in total.

| Points | Name | Team | Pos | Apps | Tries | Con | Pen | Drop |
|---|---|---|---|---|---|---|---|---|
| 105 | Percy Montgomery | South Africa | FB | 7 | 2 | 22 | 17 | 0 |
| 91 | Felipe Contepomi | Argentina | CE | 7 | 3 | 11 | 18 | 0 |
| 67 | Jonny Wilkinson | England | FH | 5 | 0 | 5 | 14 | 5 |
| 50 | Nick Evans | New Zealand | FH/FB | 4 | 2 | 20 | 0 | 0 |
| 47 | Jean-Baptiste Élissalde | France | SH | 7 | 1 | 12 | 6 | 0 |
| 46 | Chris Paterson | Scotland | WG/FH | 5 | 1 | 10 | 7 | 0 |
| 44 | Pierre Hola | Tonga | FH | 4 | 0 | 7 | 10 | 0 |
| 43 | Lionel Beauxis | France | FH | 6 | 1 | 7 | 8 | 0 |
| 42 | Nicky Little | Fiji | FH | 3 | 0 | 9 | 8 | 0 |
| 40 | Dan Carter | New Zealand | FH | 3 | 1 | 10 | 5 | 0 |
| 40 | Matt Giteau | Australia | CE | 4 | 3 | 8 | 3 | 0 |
| 40 | Bryan Habana | South Africa | WG | 7 | 8 | 0 | 0 | 0 |

== See also ==
- 2007 Rugby World Cup warm-up tests
