= 2007 Rugby World Cup squads =

Sports teams

The 2007 Rugby World Cup was played in France between 7 September and 20 October 2007. Each of the twenty competing nations was required to confirm their 30-man squad by 14 August. United States player Thretton Palamo, aged 18 when the teams were named and 8 days past his 19th birthday when he made his only appearance in the competition, was the youngest to ever take part at a World Cup final stage.

== Pool A ==
=== England ===
Final squad released on 13 August 2007. Jamie Noon was sent home injured on 15 September; he was replaced by Newcastle Falcons team-mate, Toby Flood. After Josh Lewsey was injured in the semi-final against France, Nick Abendanon was called up as cover.

Head coach: (England) Brian Ashton

Note: Flags indicate national union for the club/province as defined by World Rugby.

Player	Position	Date of birth (age)	Caps	Club/province
George Chuter	Hooker	9 July 1976 (aged 31)	12	(England) Leicester Tigers
Lee Mears	Hooker	5 March 1979 (aged 28)	16	(England) Bath
Mark Regan	Hooker	28 January 1972 (aged 35)	37	(England) Bristol
Perry Freshwater	Prop	27 July 1973 (aged 34)	7	(France) Perpignan
Andrew Sheridan	Prop	11 January 1979 (aged 28)	10	(England) Sale Sharks
Matt Stevens	Prop	1 October 1982 (aged 25)	11	(England) Bath
Phil Vickery (c)	Prop	14 March 1976 (aged 31)	53	(England) Wasps
Steve Borthwick	Lock	12 October 1979 (aged 28)	28	(England) Bath
Ben Kay	Lock	14 December 1975 (aged 31)	45	(England) Leicester Tigers
Simon Shaw	Lock	28 January 1972 (aged 35)	36	(England) Wasps
Martin Corry	Flanker	12 October 1973 (aged 33)	55	(England) Leicester Tigers
Lewis Moody	Flanker	12 June 1978 (aged 29)	45	(England) Leicester Tigers
Tom Rees	Flanker	11 September 1984 (aged 23)	5	(England) Wasps
Joe Worsley	Flanker	14 June 1977 (aged 30)	56	(England) Wasps
Lawrence Dallaglio	Number 8	10 August 1972 (aged 35)	79	(England) Wasps
Nick Easter	Number 8	15 August 1978 (aged 29)	5	(England) Harlequins
Andy Gomarsall	Scrum-half	24 July 1974 (aged 33)	25	(England) Harlequins
Shaun Perry	Scrum-half	4 May 1978 (aged 29)	10	(England) Bristol
Peter Richards	Scrum-half	10 March 1978 (aged 29)	6	(England) London Irish
Olly Barkley	Fly-half	28 November 1981 (aged 25)	16	(England) Bath
Jonny Wilkinson	Fly-half	25 May 1979 (aged 28)	57	(England) Newcastle
Toby Flood	Fly-half	8 August 1985 (aged 31)	9	(England) Newcastle
Mike Catt	Centre	17 September 1971 (aged 36)	69	(England) London Irish
Andy Farrell	Centre	30 May 1975 (aged 32)	3	(England) Saracens
Dan Hipkiss	Centre	4 June 1982 (aged 25)	1	(England) Leicester Tigers
Jamie Noon	Centre	9 May 1979 (aged 28)	24	(England) Newcastle
Mathew Tait	Centre	6 February 1986 (aged 21)	11	(England) Newcastle
Mark Cueto	Wing	26 December 1979 (aged 27)	19	(England) Sale Sharks
Josh Lewsey	Wing	30 November 1976 (aged 30)	47	(England) Wasps
Paul Sackey	Wing	8 November 1979 (aged 27)	2	(England) Wasps
Nick Abendanon	Fullback	27 August 1986 (aged 21)	2	(England) Bath
Jason Robinson	Fullback	30 July 1974 (aged 33)	51	Unattached

=== Samoa ===
Final squad announced on 29 August 2007.

- Filipo Levi and Donald Kerslake were replaced by Tani Fuga and Alfie Vaeluaga before the tournament
- Sailosi Tagicakibau replaced Anitelia Tuilagi, ahead of the Tonga game.
- Fosi Pala'amo was called in to replace Justin Va'a for the England game.
- Na'ama Leleimalefaga was called into the squad to replace Fosi Pala'amo for the USA game.

Head coach: (New Zealand) Michael Jones

Note: Flags indicate national union for the club/province as defined by World Rugby.

Player	Position	Date of birth (age)	Caps	Club/province
Tani Fuga	Hooker	14 July 1973	1	(England) Harlequins
Mahonri Schwalger	Hooker	15 September 1978	17	(Wales) Scarlets
Silao Vaisola Sefo	Hooker	15 January 1979	0	(New Zealand) Alhambra
Census Johnston	Prop	6 May 1981	11	(England) Saracens
Kas Lealamanua	Prop	15 December 1976	15	(France) Dax
Na'ama Leleimalefaga	Prop	20 November 1987	1	(France) Montpellier
Fosi Pala'amo	Prop	23 August 1976	1	(England) Leeds
Muliufi Salanoa	Prop	16 August 1980	10	(Samoa) Skopa
Justin Va'a	Prop	26 July 1978	11	(Scotland) Glasgow Warriors
Leo Lafaiali'i	Lock	30 January 1974	15	(Japan) Yokogawa
Joe Tekori	Lock	17 December 1983	4	(France) Castres
Kane Thompson	Lock	9 January 1982	5	(France) Dax
Daniel Leo	Flanker	2 October 1982	11	(England) Wasps
Justin Purdie	Flanker	13 May 1980	3	(France) Dax
Semo Sititi (c)	Flanker	6 March 1974	27	(Japan) Docomo
Ulia Ulia	Flanker	13 June 1980	9	(Samoa) Marist St. Joseph
Henry Tuilagi	Number 8	12 August 1976	4	(France) Perpignan
Alfie To'oala	Number 8	30 January 1980	1	(England) Bristol
Junior Poluleuligaga	Scrum-half	5 February 1981	5	(France) Toulon
Steven So'oialo	Scrum-half	11 May 1977	21	(England) Harlequins
Loki Crichton	Fly-half	14 March 1976	8	(England) Worcester
Eliota Fuimaono-Sapolu	Fly-half	21 October 1980	5	(England) Bath
Brian Lima	Centre	25 January 1972	27	Unattached
Seilala Mapusua	Centre	27 February 1980	9	(England) London Irish
Jerry Meafou	Centre	22 April 1982	1	(Samoa) Skopa
Elvis Seveali'i	Centre	20 June 1978	19	(England) Sale Sharks
Anitelea Tuilagi	Centre	5 June 1986	9	(England) Leeds
Lome Fa'atau	Wing	23 October 1975	21	(Scotland) Glasgow
David Lemi	Wing	10 February 1982	6	(England) Bristol
Sailosi Tagicakibau	Wing	14 November 1982	8	(England) London Irish
Alesana Tuilagi	Wing	24 April 1981	4	(England) Leicester Tigers
Lolo Lui	Fullback	4 January 1982	7	(Samoa) Moataa
Gavin Williams	Fullback	25 October 1979	4	(France) Dax

=== South Africa ===
Squad released 21 July 2007

Pierre Spies was withdrawn from the squad after developing a condition believed to be a pulmonary embolism, with Bismarck du Plessis taking his place, although one specialist disputed the diagnosis. A third specialist confirmed the original diagnosis, and Spies remained off the team.

On 10 September, after South Africa's match against Samoa, Jean de Villiers was ruled out of the rest of the World Cup with a torn left biceps suffered in that match. Wayne Julies replaced him on the squad.

On 1 October, Jannie du Plessis, older brother of Bismarck du Plessis, replaced BJ Botha, who tore knee ligaments in South Africa's last pool match against the United States.

Head coach: (South Africa) Jake White

Note: Flags indicate national union for the club/province as defined by World Rugby.

Player	Position	Date of birth (age)	Caps	Club/province
Gary Botha	Hooker	12 October 1981 (aged 25)	9	(South Africa) Bulls
Bismarck du Plessis	Hooker	22 May 1984 (aged 23)	2	(South Africa) Sharks
John Smit (c)	Hooker	3 April 1978 (aged 29)	67	(South Africa) Sharks
BJ Botha	Prop	4 January 1980 (aged 27)	10	(South Africa) Sharks
Jannie du Plessis	Prop	16 November 1982 (aged 24)	2	(South Africa) Cheetahs
Os du Randt	Prop	8 September 1972 (aged 35)	72	(South Africa) Cheetahs
Gurthro Steenkamp	Prop	12 June 1981 (aged 26)	11	(South Africa) Bulls
CJ van der Linde	Prop	27 August 1980 (aged 27)	39	(South Africa) Cheetahs
Bakkies Botha	Lock	22 September 1979 (aged 28)	35	(South Africa) Bulls
Victor Matfield	Lock	11 May 1977 (aged 30)	58	(South Africa) Bulls
Johann Muller	Lock	6 January 1980 (aged 27)	16	(South Africa) Sharks
Albert van den Berg	Lock	26 January 1974 (aged 33)	46	(South Africa) Sharks
Schalk Burger	Flanker	13 April 1983 (aged 24)	31	(South Africa) Stormers
Juan Smith	Flanker	30 July 1981 (aged 26)	32	(South Africa) Cheetahs
Wikus van Heerden	Flanker	28 February 1979 (aged 28)	7	(South Africa) Bulls
Danie Rossouw	Number 8	6 May 1978 (aged 29)	24	(South Africa) Bulls
Bobby Skinstad	Number 8	3 July 1976 (aged 31)	38	(South Africa) Sharks
Fourie du Preez	Scrum-half	24 March 1982 (aged 25)	30	(South Africa) Bulls
Ricky Januarie	Scrum-half	1 February 1982 (aged 25)	18	(South Africa) Stormers
Ruan Pienaar	Scrum-half	10 March 1984 (aged 23)	12	(South Africa) Sharks
Butch James	Fly-half	8 January 1979 (aged 28)	18	(South Africa) Sharks
André Pretorius	Fly-half	29 December 1978 (aged 28)	24	(South Africa) Lions
Jean de Villiers	Centre	24 February 1981 (aged 26)	31	(South Africa) Stormers
Jaque Fourie	Centre	4 March 1983 (aged 24)	29	(South Africa) Lions
Wayne Julies	Centre	23 October 1978 (aged 28)	10	(South Africa) Bulls
Wynand Olivier	Centre	11 June 1983 (aged 24)	17	(South Africa) Bulls
François Steyn	Centre	14 May 1987 (aged 20)	8	(South Africa) Sharks
Bryan Habana	Wing	12 June 1983 (aged 24)	27	(South Africa) Bulls
Akona Ndungane	Wing	20 February 1981 (aged 26)	8	(South Africa) Bulls
JP Pietersen	Wing	12 July 1986 (aged 21)	6	(South Africa) Sharks
Ashwin Willemse	Wing	8 September 1981 (aged 26)	16	(South Africa) Lions
Percy Montgomery	Fullback	15 March 1974 (aged 33)	85	(South Africa) Sharks

=== Tonga ===
Squad announced on 10 August 2007 Kisi Pulu replaced Mosese Moala, while Maama Molitika was called up to replace Paino Hehea ahead of the England game.

Head coach: (Tonga) Quddus Fielea

Note: Flags indicate national union for the club/province as defined by World Rugby.

Player	Position	Date of birth (age)	Caps	Club/province
Aleki Lutui	Hooker	1 July 1978	21	(England) Worcester
Ephraim Taukafa	Hooker	26 June 1976	19	(France) Lyon
Taufaʻao Filise	Prop	26 May 1977	14	(Wales) Cardiff Blues
Siosateki Havea Mataʻu	Prop	5 December 1979	1	(France) Chalon-sur-Saône
Kisi Pulu	Prop	31 January 1978	15	(France) Perpignan
Toma Toke	Prop	20 June 1985	5	(Tonga) Tau'uta Reds
Soane Tongaʻuiha	Prop	21 January 1982	3	(England) Northampton Saints
Inoke Afeaki	Lock	12 July 1973	20	(France) Grenoble
Lisiate Faʻaoso	Lock	18 March 1983	6	(New Zealand) Manawatu
Paino Hehea	Lock	1 February 1979	6	(France) Racing Métro
Emosi Kauhenga	Lock	27 April 1981	4	(Tonga) Tau'uta Reds
Nili Latu (c)	Flanker	19 February 1982	12	(Japan) Green Rockets
Maama Molitika	Flanker	26 August 1974	15	(Wales) Cardiff Blues
Hale T-Pole	Flanker	30 April 1979	6	(Wales) Ospreys
Viliami Vaki	Flanker	27 April 1976	25	(France) Perpignan
Lotu Filipine	Number 8	27 August 1980	5	(Japan) Big Blue
Finau Maka	Number 8	11 July 1977	4	(France) Toulouse
Soane Havea	Scrum-half	29 August 1981	16	(Tonga) Tautahi Gold
Enele Taufa	Scrum-half	24 September 1984	0	(Tonga) Tau'uta Reds
Sione Tuʻipulotu	Scrum-half	28 November 1978	23	(Japan) Yokogawa
Pierre Hola	Fly-half	9 June 1978	27	(Japan) Kobelco Steelers
Suka Hufanga	Centre	18 June 1982	12	(France) Brive
Epi Taione	Centre	2 March 1979	11	(South Africa) Sharks
Hudson Tongaʻuiha	Centre	16 November 1983	15	(France) Cergy-Pontoise
Isileli Tupou	Centre	26 October 1984	6	(Tonga) Tau'uta Reds
Aisea Havili	Wing	11 March 1977	11	(England) Worcester
Ualosi Kailea	Wing	28 October 1978	0	(Tonga) Tau'uta Reds
Seti Kiole	Wing	7 June 1980	8	(France) Montauban
Tevita Tuʻifua	Wing	15 October 1975	11	(New Zealand) Counties Manukau
Joseph Wilson Vaka	Wing	21 November 1980	4	(Tonga) Tautahi Gold
Vunga Lilo	Fullback	28 February 1983	3	(England) Cornish Pirates

=== United States ===
Squad released 14 August 2007 John van der Giessen was called up to replace Luke Gross.

Head coach: (New Zealand) Peter Thorburn

Note: Flags indicate national union for the club/province as defined by World Rugby.

Player	Position	Date of birth (age)	Caps	Club/province
Blake Burdette	Hooker	19 January 1980	5	(United States) NYAC
Owen Lentz	Hooker	24 January 1980	3	(United States) Maryland Exiles
Mike MacDonald	Prop	27 November 1980	43	(England) Leeds
Matekitonga Moeakiola	Prop	16 May 1978	0	(United States) Park City Haggis
Chris Osentowski	Prop	26 February 1975	14	(United States) Belmont Shore
Jonathan Vitale	Prop	3 November 1981	3	(United States) Chicago Lions
Luke Gross	Lock	21 November 1969	62	(England) Doncaster Knights
Mike Mangan	Lock	3 November 1975	14	(United States) Denver Barbarians
Hayden Mexted	Lock	10 March 1979	6	(United States) St. Louis Bombers
Alec Parker	Lock	10 April 1974	46	(United States) Gentlemen of Aspen
John van der Giessen	Lock	6 May 1982	0	(United States) Denver Barbarians
Mark Aylor	Flanker	1 November 1978	8	(United States) Denver Barbarians
Inaki Basauri	Flanker	1 October 1984	1	(France) Marmande
Todd Clever	Flanker	16 January 1983	16	(United States) OMBAC
Louis Stanfill	Flanker	30 May 1985	5	(United States) UC Berkeley
Henry Bloomfield	Number 8	4 January 1973	0	(United States) Belmont Shore
Fifita Mounga	Number 8	1 March 1973	17	(United States) San Francisco Golden Gate
Dan Payne	Number 8	12 September 1972	1	(United States) OMBAC
Chad Erskine	Scrum-half	8 January 1980	3	(England) Waterloo
Mike Petri	Scrum-half	16 August 1984	0	(United States) Belmont Shore
Mike Hercus (c)	Fly-half	5 June 1979	31	(United States) Belmont Shore
Nese Malifa	Fly-half	10 September 1985	3	(United States) Belmont Shore
Philip Eloff	Centre	17 September 1978	32	(United States) Chicago Lions
Paul Emerick	Centre	24 January 1980	24	(Wales) Newport Gwent Dragons
Vahafolau Esikia	Centre	28 November 1979	7	(United States) San Mateo
Albert Tuipulotu	Centre	27 February 1979	16	(United States) San Mateo
Takudzwa Ngwenya	Wing	22 July 1985	0	(France) Biarritz
Thretton Palamo	Wing	22 September 1988	0	(United States) San Francisco Golden Gate
Salesi Sika	Wing	6 July 1980	13	(France) Béziers
Francois Viljoen	Fullback	16 May 1981	18	(United States) Belmont Shore
Chris Wyles	Fullback	12 February 1983	3	(United States) Belmont Shore

The following players are in reserve in case of injury.

Note: Flags indicate national union for the club/province as defined by World Rugby.

Player	Position	Date of birth (age)	Caps	Club/province
Mark Crick	Hooker	27 January 1975	3	(United States) Potomac Athletic Club
Mike French	Prop	19 November 1975	8	(United States) OMBAC
Brian LeMay	Prop	26 May 1983	0	(United States) Boston
Chris Moreno	Prop	23 April 1978	0	(United States) Denver Barbarians
John van der Giessen	Lock	6 May 1982	0	(United States) Denver Barbarians
Tyson Meek	Scrum-half	21 April 1980	4	(United States) Denver Barbarians
Andrew Osborne	Fullback	4 March 1981	1	(United States) OMBAC

== Pool B ==
=== Australia ===
Squad announced 23 July 2007. Mark Gerrard was injured in the opening game and replaced by Cameron Shepherd. Morgan Turinui was called up on 1 October 2007 to replace number 8 David Lyons.

Head coach: (Australia) John Connolly

Note: Flags indicate national union for the club/province as defined by World Rugby.

Player	Position	Date of birth (age)	Caps	Club/province
Adam Freier	Hooker	20 March 1980	15	(Australia) Waratahs
Sean Hardman	Hooker	6 May 1977	3	(Australia) Queensland Reds
Stephen Moore	Hooker	20 January 1983	16	(Australia) Queensland Reds
Al Baxter	Prop	21 January 1977	47	(Australia) Waratahs
Matt Dunning	Prop	19 December 1978	32	(Australia) Waratahs
Greg Holmes	Prop	11 June 1983	11	(Australia) Queensland Reds
Guy Shepherdson	Prop	17 February 1982	14	(Australia) Brumbies
Mark Chisholm	Lock	18 September 1981	32	(Australia) Brumbies
Hugh McMeniman	Lock	1 November 1983	8	(Australia) Queensland Reds
Nathan Sharpe	Lock	26 February 1978	60	(Australia) Western Force
Daniel Vickerman	Lock	4 June 1979	48	(Australia) Waratahs
Rocky Elsom	Flanker	14 February 1983	28	(Australia) Waratahs
George Smith	Flanker	14 July 1980	79	(Australia) Brumbies
Phil Waugh	Flanker	22 September 1979	62	(Australia) Waratahs
Wycliff Palu	Number 8	27 July 1982	13	(Australia) Waratahs
Stephen Hoiles	Number 8	13 October 1981	10	(Australia) Brumbies
Sam Cordingley	Scrum-half	20 March 1976	12	(Australia) Queensland Reds
George Gregan	Scrum-half	19 April 1973	134	(Australia) Brumbies
Berrick Barnes	Fly-half	28 May 1986	0	(Australia) Queensland Reds
Stephen Larkham	Fly-half	29 May 1974	101	(Australia) Brumbies
Morgan Turinui	Centre	5 January 1982	22	(Australia) Queensland Reds
Matt Giteau	Centre	29 September 1982	47	(Australia) Western Force
Stirling Mortlock (c)	Centre	20 May 1977	60	(Australia) Brumbies
Scott Staniforth	Centre	12 December 1977	10	(Australia) Western Force
Adam Ashley-Cooper	Wing	27 March 1984	8	(Australia) Brumbies
Cameron Shepherd	Wing	30 March 1984	6	(Australia) Western Force
Lote Tuqiri	Wing	23 September 1979	53	(Australia) Waratahs
Drew Mitchell	Wing	26 March 1984	16	(Australia) Western Force
Julian Huxley	Fullback	3 August 1979	6	(Australia) Brumbies
Chris Latham	Fullback	8 September 1975	73	(Australia) Queensland Reds

The following players are on reserve in case of injuries in the main squad

Note: Flags indicate national union for the club/province as defined by World Rugby.

Player	Position	Date of birth (age)	Caps	Club/province
Rodney Blake	Prop	29 April 1983	7	(Australia) Queensland Reds
Tatafu Polota-Nau	Hooker	26 July 1985	3	(Australia) Waratahs
James Horwill	Lock	29 May 1985	1	(Australia) Queensland Reds
Alister Campbell	Lock	17 July 1979	4	(Australia) Brumbies
Matt Cockbain	Flanker	19 September 1972	63	(Australia) Melbourne Rebels
Jone Tawake	Number 8	17 April 1982	0	(Australia) Brumbies
Josh Holmes	Scrum-half	6 January 1987	0	(Australia) Brumbies
Ryan Cross	Centre	6 October 1979	0	(Australia) Western Force
Clinton Schifcofske	Wing	10 November 1975	0	(Australia) Queensland Reds
Sam Norton-Knight	Fullback	2 December 1983	2	(Australia) Waratahs

=== Canada ===
Final squad announced 15 August 2007. Josh Jackson replaced Jamie Cudmore who was ruled out with a broken bone in his hand.

Head coach: (Canada) Ric Suggitt

Note: Flags indicate national union for the club/province as defined by World Rugby.

Player	Position	Date of birth (age)	Caps	Club/province
Aaron Carpenter	Hooker	1 September 1983	12	(Canada) Brantford
Pat Riordan	Hooker	30 September 1979	12	(Canada) Burnaby Lake
Scott Franklin	Prop	23 October 1980	2	(Canada) Castaway Wanderers
Dan Pletch	Prop	12 April 1983	16	(Canada) Oakville Crusaders
Mike Pletch	Prop	12 April 1983	7	(Canada) Oakville Crusaders
Rod Snow	Prop	1 May 1970	55	(Canada) Newfoundland Rock
Jon Thiel	Prop	31 May 1975	36	(Canada) Bayside Sharks
Mike Burak	Lock	9 October 1980	15	(France) Pau
Mike James	Lock	21 July 1973	51	(France) Stade Français
Josh Jackson	Lock	2 October 1980	15	(France) Bordeaux Bègles
Luke Tait	Lock	26 October 1981	11	(Italy) Overmach Parma
David Biddle	Flanker	10 August 1985	1	(Canada) Meralomas
Jamie Cudmore	Flanker	7 April 1980	17	(France) Clermont Auvergne
Adam Kleeberger	Flanker	2 March 1984	7	(Canada) University of Victoria
Colin Yukes	Flanker	23 October 1979	29	(France) Agen
Sean-Michael Stephen	Number 8	27 October 1982	8	(France) Béziers
Mike Webb	Number 8	19 June 1979	15	(Canada) Swilers
Ed Fairhurst	Scrum-half	7 May 1979	27	(England) Cornish Pirates
Matt Weingart	Scrum-half	26 June 1982	6	(Canada) Castaway Wanderers
Morgan Williams (c)	Scrum-half	17 April 1976	47	(France) Albi
Nathan Hirayama	Fly-half	23 March 1988	0	(Canada) University of Victoria
Ander Monro	Fly-half	6 September 1981	6	(England) Waterloo
Ryan Smith	Fly-half	13 September 1979	29	(France) Montauban
Craig Culpan	Centre	17 May 1982	2	(Canada) Meralomas
Derek Daypuck	Centre	20 February 1978	16	(Canada) Castaway Wanderers
Dave Spicer	Centre	31 May 1985	8	(Canada) University of Victoria
Nick Trenkel	Centre	7 April 1987	0	(Canada) Capilano
Justin Mensah-Coker	Wing	18 November 1983	7	(France) Albi
James Pritchard	Wing	21 July 1979	12	(England) Bedford Blues
D. T. H. van der Merwe	Wing	28 April 1986	2	(Canada) James Bay AA
Mike Pyke	Fullback	24 March 1984	14	(France) Montauban

=== Fiji ===
Final squad announced 22 July 2007. Filimoni Bolavucu was ruled out of the tournament and was replaced by Sireli Bobo.

Head coach: (Fiji) Ilivasi Tabua

Note: Flags indicate national union for the club/province as defined by World Rugby.

Player	Position	Date of birth (age)	Caps	Club/province
Bill Gadolo	Hooker	May 1, 1977 (age 49)	19	(Fiji) Barbarians
Sunia Koto	Hooker	April 15, 1980 (age 46)	14	(Fiji) Warriors
Vereniki Sauturaga	Hooker	November 18, 1982 (age 43)	1	(Fiji) Warriors
Graham Dewes	Prop	January 24, 1982 (age 44)	3	(New Zealand) Marist
Henry Qiodravu	Prop	February 8, 1977 (age 49)	13	(France) Orléans
Jone Railomo	Prop	February 26, 1981 (age 45)	1	(France) Poitiers
Alefoso Yalayalatabua	Prop	January 22, 1977 (age 49)	4	(Fiji) Warriors
Isoa Domolailai	Lock	January 13, 1981 (age 45)	12	(France) Toulon
Kele Leawere	Lock	April 27, 1974 (age 52)	15	(Japan) Hino Motors
Wame Lewaravu	Lock	September 24, 1983 (age 43)	2	(Fiji) Barbarians
Ifereimi Rawaqa	Lock	September 20, 1980 (age 46)	34	(Japan) Fighting Bull
Semisi Naevo	Flanker	March 3, 1976 (age 50)	2	(Japan) Green Rockets
Akapusi Qera	Flanker	April 24, 1984 (age 42)	12	(England) Pertemps Bees
Aca Ratuva	Flanker	December 30, 1978 (age 47)	11	(France) Massy
Netani Talei	Flanker	March 19, 1983 (age 43)	6	(England) Doncaster Knights
Sisa Koyamaibole	Number 8	March 6, 1981 (age 45)	44	(Italy) Petrarca Padova
Jone Qovu	Number 8	August 27, 1985 (age 41)	8	(Fiji) Warriors
Jone Daunivucu	Scrum-half	June 1, 1977 (age 49)	1	(France) Tarbes
Mosese Rauluni (c)	Scrum-half	June 27, 1975 (age 51)	35	(England) Saracens
Nicky Little	Fly-half	September 13, 1976 (age 50)	79	(Italy) Petrarca Padova
Waisea Luveniyali	Fly-half	July 23, 1985 (age 41)	1	(Fiji) Warriors
Seremaia Bai	Centre	January 4, 1979 (age 47)	28	(France) Clermont
Maleli Kunavore	Centre	August 12, 1983 (age 43)	5	(France) Toulouse
Gabiriele Lovobalavu	Centre	June 20, 1985 (age 41)	4	(Fiji) Warriors
Seru Rabeni	Centre	December 27, 1978 (age 47)	26	(England) Leicester Tigers
Sireli Bobo	Wing	January 28, 1976 (age 50)	9	(France) Biarritz
Vilimoni Delasau	Wing	July 12, 1977 (age 49)	24	(France) Clermont
Isoa Neivua	Wing	June 7, 1978 (age 48)	6	(Fiji) Warriors
Norman Ligairi	Fullback	January 29, 1976 (age 50)	39	(France) Brive
Kameli Ratuvou	Fullback	November 6, 1982 (age 43)	15	(England) Saracens

=== Japan ===
Squad released 11 August 2007. Mitsugu Yamamoto replaced by Yusuke Aoki on 21 August. Daisuke Ohata tore his left Achilles tendon in Japan's final warm-up against Portugal, and was replaced by Tomoki Kitagawa.

Head coach: (New Zealand) John Kirwan

Note: Flags indicate national union for the club/province as defined by World Rugby.

Player	Position	Date of birth (age)	Caps	Club/province
Ryo Yamamura	Prop	9 August 1981	34	(Japan) Jubilo
Masahito Yamamoto	Prop	29 May 1978	25	(Japan) Verblitz
Tomokazu Soma	Prop	5 June 1977	13	(Japan) Wild Knights
Tatsukichi Nishiura	Prop	20 February 1976	7	(Japan) West Red Sparks
Yuji Matsubara	Hooker	5 September 1979	19	(Japan) Kobelco Steelers
Yusuke Aoki	Hooker	19 June 1983	2	(Japan) Verblitz
Hitoshi Ono	Lock	6 May 1978	20	(Japan) Brave Lupus
Takanori Kumagae	Lock	31 May 1978	25	(Japan) Green Rockets
Luatangi Vatuvei	Lock	8 December 1977	20	(Japan) Liners
Luke Thompson	Lock	16 April 1981	5	(Japan) Liners
Yasunori Watanabe	Flanker	2 June 1974	30	(Japan) Brave Lupus
Hajime Kiso	Flanker	7 November 1978	28	(Japan) Jubilo
Hare Makiri	Flanker	31 May 1978	16	(Japan) Fukuoka
Philip O'Reilly	Flanker	24 July 1980	5	(Japan) Wild Knights
Takamichi Sasaki	Flanker	30 October 1983	5	(Japan) Sungoliath
Takuro Miuchi (c)	Number 8	11 December 1975	36	(Japan) Green Rockets
Yuki Yatomi	Scrum-half	16 February 1985	7	(Japan) Jubilo
Tomoki Yoshida	Scrum-half	22 February 1982	4	(Japan) Brave Lupus
Kim Chul-won	Scrum-half	22 January 1984	0	(Japan) Liners
Eiji Ando	Fly-half	14 May 1982	12	(Japan) Green Rockets
Kousei Ono	Fly-half	17 April 1987	3	(Japan) Fukuoka
Shotaro Onishi	Centre	18 November 1978	24	(Japan) Jubilo
Nataniela Oto	Centre	16 May 1980	11	(Japan) Brave Lupus
Yuta Imamura	Centre	31 October 1984	11	(Japan) Kobelco Steelers
Koji Taira	Centre	12 January 1983	3	(Japan) Sungoliath
Bryce Robins	Centre	19 September 1980	6	(Japan) Black Rams
Hirotoki Onozawa	Wing	29 March 1978	35	(Japan) Sungoliath
Kosuke Endo	Wing	11 November 1980	13	(Japan) Verblitz
Tomoki Kitagawa	Wing	25 July 1983	2	(Japan) Wild Knights
Christian Loamanu	Wing	13 May 1986	7	(Japan) Saitama
Go Aruga	Fullback	13 November 1983	7	(Japan) Sungoliath

The following players are on reserve in case of injury.

Note: Flags indicate national union for the club/province as defined by World Rugby.

Player	Position	Date of birth (age)	Caps	Club/province
Takahiro Sugiura	Prop	4 October 1983	1	(Japan) Fukuoka
Yuta Inose	Prop	15 March 1982	0	(Japan) Green Rockets
Taku Inokuchi	Hooker	5 October 1982	1	(Japan) Brave Lupus
Ryota Asano	Flanker	25 September 1979	20	(Japan) Green Rockets
James Arlidge	Fly-half	11 August 1979	1	(Japan) Docomo

=== Wales ===
Squad announced 10 August 2007

Head coach: (Wales) Gareth Jenkins

Note: Flags indicate national union for the club/province as defined by World Rugby.

Player	Position	Date of birth (age)	Caps	Club/province
Huw Bennett	Hooker	11 June 1983	12	(Wales) Ospreys
Matthew Rees	Hooker	9 December 1980	11	(Wales) Llanelli Scarlets
T. Rhys Thomas	Hooker	23 April 1982	10	(Wales) Cardiff Blues
Chris Horsman	Prop	2 February 1978	11	(England) Worcester Warriors
Gethin Jenkins	Prop	17 November 1980	46	(Wales) Cardiff Blues
Adam Jones	Prop	8 March 1981	41	(Wales) Ospreys
Duncan Jones	Prop	18 September 1978	38	(Wales) Ospreys
Ian Evans	Lock	4 October 1984	5	(Wales) Ospreys
Ian Gough	Lock	10 November 1976	40	(Wales) Ospreys
Will James	Lock	12 December 1976	1	(England) Gloucester
Alun Wyn Jones	Lock	19 September 1985	11	(Wales) Ospreys
Colin Charvis	Flanker	27 December 1972	87	(Wales) Newport Gwent Dragons
Martyn Williams	Flanker	1 September 1975	70	(Wales) Cardiff Blues
Jonathan Thomas	Flanker	27 December 1982	34	(Wales) Ospreys
Michael Owen	Number 8	7 November 1980	37	(Wales) Newport Gwent Dragons
Alix Popham	Number 8	17 October 1979	30	(Wales) Llanelli Scarlets
Gareth Cooper	Scrum-half	7 May 1979	34	(England) Gloucester
Dwayne Peel	Scrum-half	31 August 1981	53	(Wales) Llanelli Scarlets
Mike Phillips	Scrum-half	29 August 1982	22	(Wales) Ospreys
Stephen Jones	Fly-half	8 December 1977	62	(Wales) Llanelli Scarlets
Ceri Sweeney	Fly-half	21 January 1980	32	(Wales) Newport Gwent Dragons
James Hook	Centre	27 June 1985	13	(Wales) Ospreys
Sonny Parker	Centre	27 August 1977	23	(Wales) Ospreys
Jamie Robinson	Centre	7 April 1980	20	(Wales) Cardiff Blues
Tom Shanklin	Centre	24 November 1979	41	(Wales) Cardiff Blues
Dafydd James	Wing	24 July 1975	46	(Wales) Llanelli Scarlets
Mark Jones	Wing	7 November 1979	29	(Wales) Llanelli Scarlets
Shane Williams	Wing	26 February 1977	46	(Wales) Ospreys
Kevin Morgan	Fullback	23 February 1977	43	(Wales) Newport Gwent Dragons
Gareth Thomas (c)	Fullback	25 July 1974	95	(Wales) Cardiff Blues

== Pool C ==
=== Italy ===
Squad released 16 August 2007. Carlo Del Fava withdrew due to injury on 17 August. Fabio Staibano was originally announced as his replacement, but he was in turn ruled out due to injury. Del Fava was later ruled fit to play, and was restored to the squad on 27 August. Silvio Orlando replaced Robert Barbieri after he was ruled out due to injury in a warm-up game.

Head coach: (France) Pierre Berbizier

Note: Flags indicate national union for the club/province as defined by World Rugby.

Player	Position	Date of birth (age)	Caps	Club/province
Carlo Festuccia	Hooker	20 June 1980	39	(Italy) Gran Parma
Leonardo Ghiraldini	Hooker	26 December 1984	5	(Italy) Calvisano
Fabio Ongaro	Hooker	23 September 1977	49	(England) Saracens
Matías Agüero	Prop	13 February 1981	7	(Italy) Viadana
Martin Castrogiovanni	Prop	21 October 1981	45	(England) Leicester Tigers
Andrea Lo Cicero	Prop	7 May 1976	67	(Italy) L'Aquila
Salvatore Perugini	Prop	6 March 1978	44	(France) Toulouse
Valerio Bernabò	Lock	3 March 1984	11	(Italy) Calvisano
Marco Bortolami (c)	Lock	12 June 1980	61	(England) Gloucester
Carlo Del Fava	Lock	1 July 1981	21	(France) Bourgoin
Santiago Dellapè	Lock	9 May 1978	44	(France) Biarritz Olympique
Mauro Bergamasco	Flanker	1 May 1979	58	(France) Stade Français
Silvio Orlando	Flanker	9 February 1981	13	(Italy) Benetton Treviso
Josh Sole	Flanker	15 February 1980	21	(Italy) Viadana
Alessandro Zanni	Flanker	31 January 1984	16	(Italy) Calvisano
Sergio Parisse	Number 8	13 September 1983	42	(France) Stade Français
Manoa Vosawai	Number 8	12 August 1983	2	(Italy) Overmach Parma
Paul Griffen	Scrum-half	30 March 1975	35	(Italy) Calvisano
Alessandro Troncon	Scrum-half	6 September 1973	97	(France) Clermont Auvergne
Roland de Marigny	Fly-half	17 November 1975	17	(Italy) Calvisano
Ramiro Pez	Fly-half	6 December 1978	38	(France) Bayonne
Mirco Bergamasco	Centre	23 February 1983	44	(France) Stade Français
Gonzalo Canale	Centre	11 November 1982	33	(France) Clermont Auvergne
Andrea Masi	Centre	30 March 1981	31	(France) Biarritz Olympique
Pablo Canavosio	Wing	26 December 1981	16	(France) Castres Olympique
Matteo Pratichetti	Wing	27 July 1985	7	(Italy) Calvisano
Kaine Robertson	Wing	29 October 1980	23	(Italy) Viadana
Marko Stanojevic	Wing	1 October 1979	6	(England) Bristol
David Bortolussi	Fullback	21 July 1981	10	(France) Montpellier Hérault
Ezio Galon	Fullback	22 July 1977	11	(Italy) Overmach Parma

=== New Zealand ===
Squad announced 22 July 2007

Head coach: (New Zealand) Graham Henry

Player	Position	Date of birth (age)	Caps	Franchise/province
Carl Hayman	Prop	14 November 1979	41	(New Zealand) Otago
Greg Somerville	Prop	28 November 1977	55	(New Zealand) Canterbury
Neemia Tialata	Prop	15 July 1982	17	(New Zealand) Wellington
Tony Woodcock	Prop	27 January 1981	33	(New Zealand) North Harbour
Andrew Hore	Hooker	13 September 1978	21	(New Zealand) Taranaki
Keven Mealamu	Hooker	20 March 1979	47	(New Zealand) Auckland
Anton Oliver	Hooker	9 September 1975	55	(New Zealand) Otago
Chris Jack	Lock	5 September 1978	62	(New Zealand) Tasman
Keith Robinson	Lock	14 December 1976	10	(New Zealand) Waikato
Ali Williams	Lock	30 April 1981	42	(New Zealand) Auckland
Jerry Collins	Flanker	4 November 1980	44	(New Zealand) Wellington
Chris Masoe	Flanker	15 May 1979	15	(New Zealand) Wellington
Richie McCaw (c)	Flanker	31 December 1980	55	(New Zealand) Canterbury
Reuben Thorne	Flanker	2 January 1975	48	(New Zealand) Canterbury
Sione Lauaki	Number 8	22 June 1981	7	(New Zealand) Waikato
Rodney So'oialo	Number 8	3 October 1979	37	(New Zealand) Wellington
Andy Ellis	Scrum-half	21 February 1984	2	(New Zealand) Canterbury
Byron Kelleher	Scrum-half	3 December 1976	54	(New Zealand) Waikato
Brendon Leonard	Scrum-half	16 April 1985	4	(New Zealand) Waikato
Dan Carter	Fly-half	5 March 1982	41	(New Zealand) Canterbury
Nick Evans	Fly-half	14 August 1980	12	(New Zealand) Otago
Aaron Mauger	Centre	29 November 1980	42	(New Zealand) Canterbury
Luke McAlister	Centre	28 August 1983	18	(New Zealand) North Harbour
Conrad Smith	Centre	12 October 1981	12	(New Zealand) Wellington
Isaia Toeava	Centre	5 January 1986	10	(New Zealand) Auckland
Doug Howlett	Wing	21 September 1978	59	(New Zealand) Auckland
Joe Rokocoko	Wing	6 June 1983	45	(New Zealand) Auckland
Sitiveni Sivivatu	Wing	19 April 1982	17	(New Zealand) Waikato
Leon MacDonald	Fullback	21 December 1977	47	(New Zealand) Canterbury
Mils Muliaina	Fullback	31 July 1980	52	(New Zealand) Waikato

=== Portugal ===
Portugal named their final squad for the tournament on 3 September 2007.

Head coach: (Portugal) Tomaz Morais

Note: Flags indicate national union for the club/province as defined by World Rugby.

Player	Position	Date of birth (age)	Caps	Club/province
Rui Cordeiro	Prop	14 October 1976	39	(Portugal) Académica de Coimbra
Ruben Spachuck	Prop	14 February 1981	18	(Portugal) Belenenses
Duarte Figueiredo	Prop	25 June 1982	3	(Portugal) CDUL
André Silva	Prop	9 February 1975	12	(France) Stade Montois
Juan Muré	Prop	21 March 1983	0	(Portugal) Belenenses
João Correia	Hooker	19 August 1978	26	(Portugal) Direito
Joaquim Ferreira	Hooker	27 April 1973	82	(Portugal) CDUP
Gonçalo Uva	Lock	15 December 1982	27	(France) Montpellier
David Penalva	Lock	26 January 1981	18	(France) Blagnac
Marcello d'Orey	Lock	7 March 1976	59	(Portugal) CDUP
Salvador Palha	Lock	14 April 1984	2	(Portugal) Direito
João Uva	Flanker	19 May 1980	35	(Portugal) Belenenses
Paulo Murinello	Flanker	4 May 1974	22	(Portugal) Cascais
Diogo Coutinho	Flanker	3 September 1977	28	(Portugal) Direito
Tiago Girão	Flanker	30 November 1984	2	(Portugal) CDUL
Juan Severino Somoza	Flanker	16 September 1981	10	(Portugal) Agronomia
Vasco Uva (c)	Number 8	15 June 1982	39	(Portugal) Direito
Luís Pissarra	Scrum-half	5 October 1975	68	(Portugal) Agronomia
José Pinto	Scrum-half	5 February 1981	30	(Portugal) Direito
Gonçalo Malheiro	Fly-half	11 May 1978	38	(Portugal) CDUP
Duarte Cardoso Pinto	Fly-half	17 March 1982	25	(Portugal) Agronomia
Pedro Cabral	Fly-half	29 June 1983	3	(Portugal) CDUL
Diogo Mateus	Centre	7 February 1980	48	(Portugal) Belenenses
Diogo Gama	Centre	15 July 1981	10	(Portugal) Benfica
Miguel Portela	Centre	4 March 1974	53	(Portugal) Direito
Frederico Sousa	Centre	18 August 1978	38	(Portugal) Direito
António Aguilar	Wing	6 July 1978	47	(Portugal) Direito
Pedro Carvalho	Wing	29 June 1984	21	(Portugal) Direito
Gonçalo Foro	Wing	14 April 1982	15	(Portugal) CDUL
David Mateus	Wing	7 February 1980	15	(Portugal) Belenenses
Pedro Leal	Fullback	28 April 1984	20	(Portugal) Direito

=== Romania ===
Squad announced 14 August 2007

Head coach: (France) Daniel Santamans

Note: Flags indicate national union for the club/province as defined by World Rugby.

Player	Position	Date of birth (age)	Caps	Club/province
Petru Bălan	Prop	12 July 1976	53	(France) Biarritz
Bogdan Bălan	Prop	11 February 1980	22	(France) Montauban
Silviu Florea	Prop	19 July 1977	15	(France) Béziers
Paulică Ion	Prop	10 January 1983	20	(England) Bath
Cezar Popescu	Prop	29 December 1976	32	(France) Agen
Petrișor Toderașc	Prop	15 July 1980	46	(France) Brive
Marius Țincu	Hooker	7 April 1978	30	(France) Perpignan
Răzvan Mavrodin	Hooker	29 September 1973	46	(France) Pau
Sorin Socol (c)	Lock	30 November 1977	38	(France) Pau
Cristian Petre	Lock	23 March 1979	56	(France) Béziers
Valentin Ursache	Lock	12 August 1985	16	(Romania) Arad
Augustin Petrechei	Lock	4 August 1980	19	(France) Béziers
Ovidiu Tonița	Flanker	6 August 1980	37	(France) Perpignan
Florin Corodeanu	Flanker	26 March 1977	50	(France) Grenoble
Alexandru Manta	Flanker	7 June 1977	23	(France) Castres
Costica Mersoiu	Flanker	30 October 1977	28	(Romania) Dinamo București
Alexandru Tudori	Flanker	11 October 1978	29	(Romania) Dinamo București
Cosmin Rațiu	Number 8	18 June 1979	16	(Romania) Dinamo București
Valentin Calafateanu	Scrum-half	25 January 1985	14	(Romania) Dinamo București
Lucian Sîrbu	Scrum-half	16 October 1976	48	(France) Béziers
Ionuț Dimofte	Fly-half	30 September 1984	17	(Romania) Arad
Dănuț Dumbravă	Fly-half	6 August 1981	32	(Romania) Steaua Bucharest
Romeo Gontineac	Centre	18 December 1973	71	(France) Aurillac
Csaba Gál	Centre	7 March 1985	10	(Romania) U Cluj
Dan Vlad	Centre	12 July 1983	7	(Romania) Steaua Bucharest
Ionuț Tofan	Centre	8 March 1977	71	(France) Limoges
Cătălin Fercu	Wing	5 September 1986	16	(Romania) Arad
Ion Teodorescu	Wing	27 July 1976	41	(Romania) Arad
Gabriel Brezoianu	Wing	18 January 1977	65	(France) Racing Métro
Cătălin Nicolae	Wing	22 July 1980	4	(Romania) Steaua Bucharest
Iulian Dumitraș	Fullback	22 June 1982	12	(France) Pau
Florin Vlaicu	Fullback	26 July 1986	11	(Romania) Steaua Bucharest

=== Scotland ===
Squad announced 14 August 2007. On 11 September, his 24th birthday, Alasdair Dickinson was called up to the Scotland squad to replace the injured Allan Jacobsen.

Head coach: (Scotland) Frank Hadden

Note: Flags indicate national union for the club/province as defined by World Rugby.

Player	Position	Date of birth (age)	Caps	Club/province
Ross Ford	Hooker	23 April 1984	14	(Scotland) Glasgow
Scott Lawson	Hooker	28 September 1981	11	(England) Sale Sharks
Fergus Thomson	Hooker	18 September 1983	2	(Scotland) Glasgow
Alasdair Dickinson	Prop	11 September 1983	0	(Scotland) Edinburgh
Allan Jacobsen	Prop	22 September 1978	23	(Scotland) Edinburgh
Gavin Kerr	Prop	3 April 1977	42	(Scotland) Glasgow
Euan Murray	Prop	7 August 1980	11	(England) Northampton
Craig Smith	Prop	30 August 1978	19	(Scotland) Edinburgh
Jim Hamilton	Lock	17 November 1982	9	(England) Leicester
Nathan Hines	Lock	29 November 1976	44	(France) Perpignan
Scott MacLeod	Lock	3 March 1979	9	(Wales) Scarlets
Scott Murray	Lock	15 January 1976	85	(France) Montauban
John Barclay	Flanker	24 September 1986	0	(Scotland) Glasgow
Kelly Brown	Flanker	8 June 1982	14	(Scotland) Glasgow
Ally Hogg	Flanker	20 July 1983	35	(Scotland) Edinburgh
Jason White (c)	Flanker	17 April 1978	59	(England) Sale Sharks
Dave Callam	Number 8	15 February 1983	9	(Scotland) Edinburgh
Simon Taylor	Number 8	17 August 1979	54	(France) Stade Français
Mike Blair	Scrum-half	20 April 1981	39	(Scotland) Edinburgh
Chris Cusiter	Scrum-half	13 June 1982	32	(France) Perpignan
Rory Lawson	Scrum-half	12 March 1981	7	(England) Gloucester
Dan Parks	Fly-half	26 May 1978	32	(Scotland) Glasgow
Rob Dewey	Centre	19 October 1983	8	(Ireland) Ulster
Marcus Di Rollo	Centre	31 March 1978	19	(Scotland) Edinburgh
Andrew Henderson	Centre	3 February 1980	46	(Scotland) Glasgow
Simon Webster	Centre	8 March 1981	24	(Scotland) Edinburgh
Sean Lamont	Wing	15 January 1981	31	(England) Northampton
Nikki Walker	Wing	5 March 1982	8	(Wales) Ospreys
Chris Paterson	Wing	30 March 1978	76	(England) Gloucester
Rory Lamont	Fullback	10 March 1982	10	(England) Sale Sharks
Hugo Southwell	Fullback	14 May 1980	31	(Scotland) Edinburgh

== Pool D ==
=== Argentina ===
Squad released 28 July 2007 from Planet-Rugby. Additional information from Unión Argentina de Rugby.

Martín Gaitán was forced to withdraw from the squad on 18 August after it was discovered he had a blocked artery in his heart, and was replaced by Hernán Senillosa. José María Núñez Piossek was forced to withdraw from the squad due to injury on 30 August, and was replaced by Federico Martín Aramburú. Mario Ledesma was forced to withdraw from the squad for the third-place match against France due to injury on 15 October, and was replaced by Eusebio Guiñazú.

Head coach: (Argentina) Marcelo Loffreda

Note: Flags indicate national union for the club/province as defined by World Rugby.

Player	Position	Date of birth (age)	Caps	Club/province
Eusebio Guiñazú	Hooker	15 January 1982	12	(France) Agen
Mario Ledesma	Hooker	17 May 1973	59	(France) Clermont
Alberto Vernet Basualdo	Hooker	8 June 1982	4	(Argentina) Alumni
Marcos Ayerza	Prop	12 January 1983	13	(England) Leicester
Santiago González Bonorino	Prop	5 May 1975	13	(Italy) Capitolina
Omar Hasan	Prop	21 April 1971	58	(France) Toulouse
Rodrigo Roncero	Prop	16 February 1977	20	(France) Stade Français
Martín Scelzo	Prop	5 February 1976	34	(France) Clermont
Patricio Albacete	Lock	9 February 1981	18	(France) Toulouse
Rimas Álvarez Kairelis	Lock	22 July 1974	31	(France) Perpignan
Ignacio Fernández Lobbe	Lock	20 November 1974	57	(England) Sale Sharks
Esteban Lozada	Lock	8 January 1982	4	(Argentina) CASI
Martín Durand	Flanker	30 May 1976	49	(France) Montpellier
Lucas Ostiglia	Flanker	3 May 1976	27	(France) Agen
Juan Martín Fernández Lobbe	Flanker	19 November 1981	14	(England) Sale Sharks
Martín Schusterman	Flanker	13 September 1975	15	(England) Leeds
Juan Manuel Leguizamón	Number 8	6 June 1983	16	(England) London Irish
Gonzalo Longo	Number 8	14 March 1974	44	(France) Clermont
Nicolás Fernández Miranda	Scrum-half	25 November 1972	41	(Argentina) Hindú
Agustín Pichot (c)	Scrum-half	22 August 1974	65	(France) Stade Français
Juan Martín Hernández	Fly-half	7 August 1982	21	(France) Stade Français
Federico Todeschini	Fly-half	8 August 1975	15	(France) Montpellier
Felipe Contepomi	Centre	20 August 1977	51	(Ireland) Leinster
Manuel Contepomi	Centre	20 August 1977	30	(Argentina) Newman
Hernán Senillosa	Centre	1 October 1977	16	(Argentina) Hindú
Gonzalo Tiesi	Centre	24 April 1985	10	(England) London Irish
Horacio Agulla	Wing	22 October 1984	5	(Argentina) Hindú
Lucas Borges	Wing	17 February 1980	18	(France) Stade Français
Federico Martín Aramburú	Wing	20 January 1980	12	(France) Perpignan
Ignacio Corleto	Fullback	21 June 1978	29	(France) Stade Français
Federico Serra Miras	Fullback	3 October 1979	7	(Argentina) SIC

=== France ===
Provisional squad announced 14 June 2007, from Planet-Rugby. Elvis Vermeulen replaced by Thierry Dusautoir due to injury on 21 June Planet-Rugby. Sylvain Marconnet was replaced due to injury by Nicolas Mas on 20 August BBC Sport.

Head coach: (France) Bernard Laporte

Note: Flags indicate national union for the club/province as defined by World Rugby.

Player	Position	Date of birth (age)	Caps	Club/province
Sébastien Bruno	Hooker	26 August 1974	22	(England) Sale Sharks
Raphaël Ibañez (c)	Hooker	17 February 1973	92	(England) Wasps
Dimitri Szarzewski	Hooker	26 January 1983	16	(France) Stade Français
Nicolas Mas	Prop	25 May 1980	10	(France) Perpignan
Olivier Milloud	Prop	9 December 1975	45	(France) Bourgoin
Jean-Baptiste Poux	Prop	26 September 1979	14	(France) Toulouse
Pieter de Villiers	Prop	3 July 1972	64	(France) Stade Français
Sébastien Chabal	Lock	8 December 1977	31	(England) Sale Sharks
Lionel Nallet	Lock	14 September 1976	28	(France) Castres
Fabien Pelous	Lock	7 December 1973	113	(France) Toulouse
Jérôme Thion	Lock	2 December 1977	36	(France) Biarritz
Serge Betsen	Flanker	25 March 1974	58	(France) Biarritz
Thierry Dusautoir	Flanker	18 November 1981	5	(France) Toulouse
Rémy Martin	Flanker	10 August 1979	18	(France) Stade Français
Yannick Nyanga	Flanker	19 December 1983	21	(France) Toulouse
Julien Bonnaire	Number 8	20 September 1978	31	(France) Clermont
Imanol Harinordoquy	Number 8	20 February 1980	41	(France) Biarritz
Jean-Baptiste Élissalde	Scrum-half	23 November 1977	23	(France) Toulouse
Pierre Mignoni	Scrum-half	28 February 1977	25	(France) Clermont
Lionel Beauxis	Fly-half	24 October 1985	6	(France) Stade Français
Frédéric Michalak	Fly-half	16 October 1982	44	(France) Toulouse
Yannick Jauzion	Centre	28 July 1978	44	(France) Toulouse
David Marty	Centre	30 October 1982	13	(France) Perpignan
David Skrela	Centre	2 March 1979	8	(France) Stade Français
Damien Traille	Centre	12 June 1979	53	(France) Biarritz
Vincent Clerc	Wing	7 May 1981	22	(France) Toulouse
Christophe Dominici	Wing	20 May 1972	62	(France) Stade Français
Cédric Heymans	Wing	20 July 1978	32	(France) Toulouse
Aurélien Rougerie	Wing	26 September 1980	46	(France) Clermont
Clément Poitrenaud	Fullback	20 May 1982	28	(France) Toulouse

The following players are on reserve in case of withdrawals from the squad.

Note: Flags indicate national union for the club/province as defined by World Rugby.

Player	Position	Date of birth (age)	Caps	Club/province
Benjamin Kayser	Hooker	26 July 1984	0	(England) Leicester
Laurent Emmanuelli	Prop	19 September 1976	0	(France) Clermont
Pascal Papé	Lock	5 December 1980	18	(France) Castres
Grégory Lamboley	Lock	12 January 1982	13	(France) Toulouse
Olivier Magne	Flanker	11 April 1973	90	(England) London Irish
Dimitri Yachvili	Scrum-half	19 September 1980	32	(France) Biarritz
Benjamin Boyet	Fly-half	8 August 1979	3	(France) Bourgoin
Brian Liebenberg	Centre	19 September 1979	12	(France) Stade Français
Jean-Philippe Grandclaude	Centre	4 August 1982	3	(France) Perpignan

=== Georgia ===
Final squad released on 9 August 2007 from Planet-Rugby, other details from Georgian RFU

Head coach: (Georgia (country)) Malkhaz Cheishvili

Note: Flags indicate national union for the club/province as defined by World Rugby.

Player	Position	Date of birth (age)	Caps	Club/province
Akvsenti Giorgadze	Hooker	4 June 1976	47	(France) Castres
David Khinchaguishvili	Prop	24 July 1982	15	(France) Bourgoin
Avtandil Kopaliani	Prop	13 June 1982	19	(France) Montauban
Mamuka Magrakvelidze	Prop	12 August 1977	18	(France) Metro Paris
Goderdzi Shvelidze	Prop	17 April 1978	37	(France) Clermont
Davit Zirakashvili	Prop	10 October 1983	13	(France) Clermont
Levan Datunashvili	Lock	18 January 1983	19	(France) Montluçon
Victor Didebulidze	Lock	4 November 1971	39	(France) Massy
Zurab Mtchedlishvili	Lock	22 October 1971	44	(France) Figeac
Mamuka Gorgodze	Lock	14 July 1984	23	(France) Montpellier
Ilia Zedguinidze (c)	Lock	20 January 1977	46	(France) Auch
Giorgi Chkhaidze	Flanker	19 August 1981	20	(France) Massy
Gia Labadze	Flanker	21 September 1973	45	(France) Toulon
Ilia Maissuradze	Flanker	1 July 1977	16	(France) Nantes
Zviad Maissuradze	Flanker	28 October 1980	19	(Georgia (country)) Locomotivi Tbilisi
Rati Urushadze	Flanker	22 September 1975	22	(France) Nice
Besso Udessiani	Number 8	14 March 1979	26	(France) Chalon
Irakli Abuseridze	Scrum-half	25 November 1977	44	(France) Orléans
Meko Kvirikashvili	Scrum-half	27 December 1983	20	(France) Pau
Bidzina Samkharadze	Scrum-half	2 October 1983	26	(Romania) Farul Constanța
Otar Barkalaia	Fly-half	17 February 1984	23	(France) Figeac
Paliko Jimsheladze	Fly-half	8 July 1975	56	(France) Arras
Revaz Gigauri	Centre	9 May 1984	11	(France) Montluçon
Irakli Giorgadze	Centre	26 December 1982	27	(France) Bourgoin
Davit Kacharava	Centre	16 January 1985	12	(France) Bastia
Malkhaz Urjukashvili	Centre	24 September 1980	21	(France) Aurillac
Giorgi Elizbarashvili	Wing	21 January 1984	14	(Russia) Krasny Yar
Otar Eloshvili	Wing	15 November 1978	9	(France) Arras
Besik Khamashuridze	Wing	14 August 1977	49	(France) Cannes
Irakli Machkhaneli	Wing	18 July 1981	24	(France) Mont-de-Marsan
Giorgi Shkinin	Wing	7 March 1983	19	(France) Blois

=== Ireland ===
Squad listed from BBC Sport 12 August 2007, further information from Irish Rugby Football Union.

Head coach: (Ireland) Eddie O'Sullivan

Note: Flags indicate national union for the club/province as defined by World Rugby.

Player	Position	Date of birth (age)	Caps	Club/province
Rory Best	Hooker	15 August 1982	13	(Ireland) Ulster
Jerry Flannery	Hooker	17 October 1978	16	(Ireland) Munster
Frankie Sheahan	Hooker	27 August 1976	28	(Ireland) Munster
Simon Best	Prop	11 February 1978	19	(Ireland) Ulster
John Hayes	Prop	2 November 1973	74	(Ireland) Munster
Marcus Horan	Prop	7 September 1977	46	(Ireland) Munster
Bryan Young	Prop	6 November 1981	8	(Ireland) Ulster
Donncha O'Callaghan	Lock	23 March 1979	35	(Ireland) Munster
Paul O'Connell	Lock	20 October 1979	44	(Ireland) Munster
Malcolm O'Kelly	Lock	19 July 1974	86	(Ireland) Leinster
Neil Best	Flanker	3 April 1979	13	(Ireland) Ulster
Simon Easterby	Flanker	21 July 1975	57	(Wales) Scarlets
Stephen Ferris	Flanker	2 September 1985	4	(Ireland) Ulster
Alan Quinlan	Flanker	13 July 1974	25	(Ireland) Munster
David Wallace	Flanker	8 July 1976	37	(Ireland) Munster
Denis Leamy	Number 8	27 November 1981	22	(Ireland) Munster
Isaac Boss	Scrum-half	9 April 1980	9	(Ireland) Ulster
Eoin Reddan	Scrum-half	20 November 1980	3	(England) Wasps
Peter Stringer	Scrum-half	13 December 1977	76	(Ireland) Munster
Ronan O'Gara	Fly-half	7 March 1977	72	(Ireland) Munster
Paddy Wallace	Fly-half	27 August 1979	5	(Ireland) Ulster
Gordon D'Arcy	Centre	10 February 1980	31	(Ireland) Leinster
Gavin Duffy	Centre	18 September 1981	7	(Ireland) Connacht
Brian O'Driscoll (c)	Centre	21 January 1979	75	(Ireland) Leinster
Brian Carney	Wing	23 July 1976	3	(Ireland) Munster
Denis Hickie	Wing	13 February 1976	58	(Ireland) Leinster
Shane Horgan	Wing	18 July 1978	55	(Ireland) Leinster
Andrew Trimble	Wing	20 October 1984	16	(Ireland) Ulster
Girvan Dempsey	Fullback	2 October 1975	74	(Ireland) Leinster
Geordan Murphy	Fullback	19 April 1978	49	(England) Leicester

=== Namibia ===
Squad released 18 July 2007 from Planet-Rugby, additional information from Namibian Rugby and South Africa Rugby.

Head coach: (Namibia) Hakkies Husselman

Note: Flags indicate national union for the club/province as defined by World Rugby.

Player	Position	Date of birth (age)	Caps	Club/province
Hugo Horn	Hooker	9 May 1977	31	(South Africa) Border
Johannes Meyer	Hooker	19 February 1981		(Namibia) Wanderers
Jané du Toit	Prop	2 October 1975	20	(South Africa) Boland
Kees Lensing (c)	Prop	1 June 1978	15	(South Africa) Sharks
Johnny Redelinghuys	Prop	7 February 1984	8	(South Africa) Kimberley Tech
Marius Visser	Prop	24 April 1982	17	(South Africa) Border
Nico Esterhuyse	Lock	5 March 1984	26	(South Africa) Maties RC
Domingo Kamonga	Lock	3 March 1974		(Namibia) United Rugby Club
Uakazuwaka Kazombiaze	Lock	25 January 1979		(Namibia) Western Suburbs
Heino Senekal	Lock	20 October 1975	24	(England) Cornish Pirates
Herman Lintvelt	Flanker	6 September 1976	30	(Namibia) United Rugby Club
Michael MacKenzie	Flanker	13 September 1983	5	(Namibia) United Rugby Club
Jacques Nieuwenhuis	Flanker	23 March 1980	20	(South Africa) Valke
Jacques Burger	Number 8	29 July 1983	12	(France) Stade Aurillacois Cantal Auvergne
Tinus du Plessis	Number 8	20 May 1984	26	(South Africa) Maties RC
Eugene Jantjies	Scrum-half	10 August 1986	28	(Namibia) Western Suburbs
Jurie van Tonder	Scrum-half	9 April 1980		(Namibia) United Rugby Club
Morné Schreuder	Fly-half	5 September 1979		(Namibia) Wanderers
Emile Wessels	Fly-half	27 June 1979		(Australia) Tuggeranong Vikings
Lu-Wayne Botes	Centre	18 January 1978	7	(South Africa) JHB University
Du Preez Grobler	Centre	8 June 1977	23	(Namibia) United Rugby Club
Bratley Langenhoven	Centre	3 December 1983	1	(South Africa) Pukke
Corne Powell	Centre	27 May 1974	25	(Namibia) Windhoek United
Piet van Zyl	Centre	14 May 1979		(South Africa) Boland
Melrick Africa	Wing	18 January 1978	19	(Namibia) Reho Falcons
John Drotsky	Wing	6 June 1984	0	(Namibia) Reho Falcons
Deon Mouton	Wing	29 November 1974	23	(Namibia) Reho Falcons
Ryan Witbooi	Wing	7 September 1985	10	(Namibia) Western Suburbs
Heini Bock	Fullback	28 December 1981	11	(Namibia) Reho Falcons
Tertius Losper	Fullback	22 November 1985	5	(Namibia) Western Suburbs
