= Garden-Bachop =

Garden-Bachop is a surname. Notable people with the surname include:

- Connor Garden-Bachop (1999–2024), New Zealand rugby union player
- Jackson Garden-Bachop (born 1994), New Zealand rugby union player
- Sue Garden-Bachop (1961–2008), New Zealand rugby union, touch, basketball, and field hockey player

== See also ==
- Bachop, another surname
