= Bachop =

Bachop is a surname. Notable people with the surname include:

- Graeme Bachop (born 1967), New Zealand rugby union footballer
- Stephen Bachop (born 1966), New Zealand rugby union player and coach

== See also ==
- Garden-Bachop, another surname
