= 2021 Super Rugby Aotearoa season =

Men's rugby union club competition

- Countries: New Zealand
- Tournament format(s): Round-robin tournament
- Champions: Crusaders (2nd title)
- Matches played: 21
- Tries scored: 129 (6.14 per match)
- Top point scorer(s): Damian McKenzie, Chiefs (111)
- Top try scorer(s): Codie Taylor, Crusaders (7)
- Official website: Official site

The 2021 Super Rugby Aotearoa season (branded as Sky Super Rugby Aotearoa for sponsorship reasons) was a professional club rugby union tournament organised by New Zealand Rugby. Announced on 11 November 2020, the tournament was the second season of Super Rugby Aotearoa, featuring the 5 New Zealand Super Rugby sides, ran from 26 February to 8 May 2021. The tournament was won by the Crusaders, who defeated the Chiefs 24–13 in the final at Orangetheory Stadium, earning them their second consecutive Super Rugby Aotearoa title, and fifth straight Super Rugby competition title.

The tournament ran parallel to Australia's 2021 Super Rugby AU season, and Super Rugby Trans-Tasman followed the conclusion of both seasons, a crossover tournament featuring each Australian team playing each New Zealand team once, followed by a final.

== Law variations ==
The 2021 Super Rugby Aotearoa season saw further law variations, furthering those brought in during the 2020 season. Goal-line drop outs were brought in for when an attacking player was held up or knocked the ball on in goal. When a kick was forced in goal by the defending team then a goal-line drop out would also take place. These rules were used successfully in the Australian 2020 Super Rugby AU season. Extra time was also used again in 2021, again consisting of a 10-minute period, however differing from the 2021 Super Rugby AU season, the team scoring the first points of any kind in this period would win the match.

A captain's referral was also brought in for 2021, similar to those used successfully in cricket and tennis, with New Zealand Rugby becoming the first to trial it in rugby union. Each team was allowed one referral per match which could be used in one of three scenarios: a decision occurring in the final five minutes of a match, an offence in the build up to a try being scored or an act of foul play. All other law variations from the 2020 season were again used in the 2021 season.

== Standings ==
Table
Pos	Team	P	W	D	L	PF	PA	PD	TF	TA	TB	LB	Pts
1	Crusaders	8	6	0	2	237	165	+72	30	18	3	1	28
2	Chiefs	8	5	0	3	187	230	−43	18	31	0	0	20
3	Blues	8	4	0	4	210	191	+19	28	21	2	2	20
4	Highlanders	8	3	0	5	201	226	−25	26	28	1	1	14
5	Hurricanes	8	2	0	6	200	223	−23	24	28	1	3	12
Points allocation
4 points to the winning team; 2 points to each team if neither team scores during extra time; 1 bonus point for a loss by seven points or fewer; 1 bonus point to any team scoring at least three tries more than the opposition

== Round-by-round ==
The table below shows the progression of all teams throughout the 2021 Super Rugby Aotearoa season. Each team's tournament points on the standings log is shown for each round, with the overall log position in brackets.

2021 Super Rugby Aotearoa team progression
Team	R1	R2	R3	R4	R5	R6	R7	R8	R9	R10	Final
Blues	4 (1st)	4 (3rd)	9 (2nd)	9 (2nd)	10 (2nd)	14 (2nd)	14 (2nd)	15 (3rd)	15 (3rd)	20 (3rd)	N/A
Chiefs	0 (3rd)	0 (4th)	0 (5th)	4 (4th)	8 (3rd)	8 (4th)	12 (3rd)	16 (2nd)	20 (2nd)	20 (2nd)	Lost
Crusaders	4 (2nd)	9 (1st)	14 (1st)	18 (1st)	18 (1st)	18 (1st)	22 (1st)	23 (1st)	28 (1st)	28 (1st)	Won
Highlanders	0 (4th)	5 (2nd)	5 (3rd)	5 (3rd)	5 (5th)	9 (3rd)	10 (4th)	14 (4th)	14 (4th)	14 (4th)	N/A
Hurricanes	0 (5th)	0 (5th)	0 (4th)	1 (5th)	5 (4th)	5 (5th)	6 (5th)	6 (5th)	7 (5th)	12 (5th)	N/A
Key:	Win	Draw	Loss	Bye	DNQ						

== Matches ==
=== Round 1 ===
26 February 2021
19:05 (GMT +13)

Highlanders	13–26	Crusaders
Try: Frizell 26' m C. Garden-Bachop 36' m Pen: Hunt (1/1) 43'	Report	Try: Taylor 13' c Hall 16' c Reece 48' m McAlister 73' c Con: Mo'unga (3/4) 14', 17', 74'

Forsyth Barr Stadium, Dunedin
Attendance: 15,000
Referee: Ben O'Keeffe

27 February 2021
19:05 (GMT +13)

Hurricanes	16–31	Blues
Try: Aumua (2) 6' m, 63' m Pen: J. Barrett (2/2) 38', 40+1'	Report	Try: Papalii 4' c Clarke 49' c Perofeta 54' c R. Ioane 77' c Con: Black (4/4) 5', 50', 55', 78'; Pen: Black (1/1) 76'

Sky Stadium, Wellington
Attendance: 11,655
Referee: Paul Williams

Bye/s: Chiefs

=== Round 2 ===
5 March 2021
19:05 (GMT +13)

Chiefs	23–39	Highlanders (1 BP)
Try: Jacobson 21' c McKenzie 29' c Con: McKenzie (2/2) 22', 30'; Pen: McKenzie (3/3) 2', 15', 66'	Report	Try: Nareki (3) 33' m, 57' c, 69' c Fakatava 50' c Frizell 53' c Con: J. Ioane (4/5) 51', 54', 58', 71'; Pen: J. Ioane (2/2) 10', 26'

FMG Stadium Waikato, Hamilton
Attendance: 700 (Note: The match between the Chiefs and the Highlanders was played with a limited capacity of 700 due to COVID-19 restrictions in New Zealand.)
Referee: Paul Williams

7 March 2021 (Note: The match between the Crusaders and the Hurricanes was rearranged from 6 March 2021 due to COVID-19 restrictions in New Zealand, to allow fans to attend the match.)
16:35 (GMT +13)

(1 BP) Crusaders	33–16	Hurricanes
Try: Taylor (2) 22' c, 47' c Mo'unga 25' c Blackadder 30' c S. Barrett 39' m Con: Mo'unga (4/5) 23', 26', 31', 47'	Report	Try: Riccitelli 56' m P. Umaga-Jensen 78' m Pen: J. Barrett (2/2) 5', 14'

Orangetheory Stadium, Christchurch
Attendance: 12,000
Referee: Ben O'Keeffe

Bye/s: Blues

=== Round 3 ===
13 March 2021
19:05 (GMT +13)

(1 BP) Crusaders	39–17	Chiefs
Try: L. Fainga'anuku 16' m Penalty try 43'; Jordan 55' c Douglas 63' c Dunshea 69' c Con: Mo'unga (2/3) 56', 64'; Burke (1/1) 70'; Pen: Mo'unga (2/2) 27', 32'	Report	Try: McKenzie 2' c Nanai-Seturo 73' c Con: McKenzie (2/2) 4', 74'; Pen: McKenzie (1/1) 9'

Orangetheory Stadium, Christchurch
Referee: James Doleman

14 March 2021
15:35 (GMT +13)

(1 BP) Blues	39–17	Highlanders
Try: Black 10' c Clarke 17' c Narawa 43' m Eklund 50' c A. Ioane 64' c Con: Black (4/5) 11', 19', 52', 65'; Pen: Black (2/2) 28', 60'	Report	Try: A. Dixon 54' c Fakatava 71' c Con: J. Ioane (2/2) 55', 73'; Pen: J. Ioane (1/1) 4'

Eden Park, Auckland
Attendance: 11,070
Referee: Mike Fraser

Bye/s: Hurricanes

=== Round 4 ===
20 March 2021
19:05 (GMT +13)

(1 BP) Hurricanes	29–35	Chiefs
Try: Campbell 11' c Riccitelli 16' m Rayasi (2) 22' c, 37' c Con: J. Barrett (3/4) 12', 24', 38'; Pen: J. Barrett (1/1) 74'	Report	Try: Trask 13' c Tiatia 57' c Weber 58' c Ah Kuoi 66' c Jacobson 75' c Con: McKenzie (5/5) 14', 57', 59', 68', 76'

Sky Stadium, Wellington
Attendance: 9,193
Referee: Ben O'Keeffe

21 March 2021
15:35 (GMT +13)

Blues	27–43	Crusaders
Try: Gibson 20' m Eklund (2) 48' c, 66' m Sotutu 72' c Con: Black (1/3) 49'; Plummer (1/1) 73'; Pen: Black (1/1) 8'	Report	Try: Goodhue 11' c Taylor 32' c Mo'unga 69' c Reece 78' c Con: Mo'unga (4/4) 11', 33', 71', 79'; Pen: Mo'unga (5/5) 27', 43', 52', 56', 60'

Eden Park, Auckland
Attendance: 20,710
Referee: Paul Williams

Bye/s: Highlanders

=== Round 5 ===
26 March 2021
19:05 (GMT +13)

Highlanders	19–30	Hurricanes
Try: B. Evans 34' c C. Garden-Bachop 62' m T. Umaga-Jensen 77' c Con: J. Ioane (2/3) 35', 78'	Report	Try: J. Barrett (3) 9' c, 39' c, 44' c Con: J. Barrett (3/3) 10', 40', 44'; Pen: J. Barrett (3/3) 6', 54', 80+1'

Forsyth Barr Stadium, Dunedin
Attendance: 13,665
Referee: Brendon Pickerill

27 March 2021
19:05 (GMT +13)

Chiefs	15–12	Blues (1 BP)
Try: Taukei'aho 58' m McKenzie 80' c Con: McKenzie (1/2) 80+1'; Pen: McKenzie (1/1) 46'	Report	Try: A. Ioane 24' c Robinson 62' m Con: Black (1/2) 25'

FMG Stadium Waikato, Hamilton
Attendance: 12,997
Referee: James Doleman

Bye/s: Crusaders

=== Round 6 ===
2 April 2021
19:05 (GMT +13)

Crusaders	12–33	Highlanders
Try: Taylor 40+3' c D. Havili 69' m Con: Mo'unga (1/2) 40+4'	Report	Try: Harmon 24' c Collins 58' c C. Garden-Bachop 74' c Con: Hunt (3/3) 26', 59', 75'; Pen: Hunt (4/4) 12', 19', 34', 52'

Orangetheory Stadium, Christchurch
Attendance: 13,677
Referee: Mike Fraser

3 April 2021
19:05 (GMT +13)

Blues	27–17	Hurricanes
Try: Penalty try 31'; Faiane 50' c Tele'a 65' c Con: Black (2/2) 52', 67'; Pen: Black (2/2) 39', 80+1'	Report	Try: Prinsep 76' m Pen: J. Barrett (4/4) 27', 37', 40+2', 46'

Eden Park, Auckland
Attendance: 11,930
Referee: Brendon Pickerill

Bye/s: Chiefs

=== Round 7 ===
10 April 2021
19:05 (GMT +12)

(1 BP) Highlanders	23–26 (a.e.t.)	Chiefs
Try: Lentjes 10' m Smith 42' m J. Ioane 70' c Con: J. Ioane (1/1) 71'; Pen: Hunt (1/1) 55'; J. Ioane (1/1) 77'	Report	Try: Nanai-Seturo 5' c Ta'avao 61' c Con: McKenzie (2/2) 7', 62'; Pen: McKenzie (4/5) 40+1', 46', 57', 86'

Forsyth Barr Stadium, Dunedin
Attendance: 14,487
Referee: Ben O'Keeffe

11 April 2021
15:35 (GMT +12)

(1 BP) Hurricanes	27–30 (a.e.t.)	Crusaders
Try: Laumape 27' c J. Savea 31' c Goosen 43' c Con: J. Barrett (3/3) 29', 32', 45'; Pen: J. Barrett (2/3) 9', 61'	Report	Try: Bridge (2) 11' c, 24' c Reece 61' m Con: Mo'unga (2/3) 11', 25'; Pen: Mo'unga (2/2) 30', 57'; Drop: D. Havili 82'

Sky Stadium, Wellington
Attendance: 13,670
Referee: Paul Williams

Bye/s: Blues

=== Round 8 ===
16 April 2021
19:05 (GMT +12)

Highlanders	35–29	Blues (1 BP)
Try: Himeno 15' c J. Ioane 25' m N. Punivai 40+2' c Nareki 58' m Collins 75' m Con: J. Ioane (2/4) 17', 40+3'; Pen: J. Ioane (1/1) 12'; Hunt (1/1) 68'	Report	Try: Ruru 6' c R. Ioane 33' c Laulala 70' c Sotutu 80' m Con: Black (3/4) 7', 34', 71'; Pen: Black (1/1) 38'

Forsyth Barr Stadium, Dunedin
Attendance: 13,379
Referee: Brendon Pickerill

17 April 2021
19:05 (GMT +12)

Chiefs	26–25	Crusaders (1 BP)
Try: L. Boshier 47' c Lowe 61' c Con: McKenzie (2/2) 48', 62'; Pen: McKenzie (4/4) 13', 22', 26', 78'	Report	Try: L. Fainga'anuku 5' c Jordan 30' c Taylor 53' m Con: Mo'unga (2/3) 7', 32'; Pen: Mo'unga (2/2) 28', 65'

FMG Stadium Waikato, Hamilton
Attendance: 18,500
Referee: Mike Fraser

Bye/s: Hurricanes

=== Round 9 ===
23 April 2021
19:05 (GMT +12)

Chiefs	26–24	Hurricanes (1 BP)
Try: Sowakula 31' c Gatland 48' c Con: McKenzie (2/2) 32', 49'; Pen: McKenzie (4/5) 15', 44', 59', 80+4'	Report	Try: Blackwell 1' c B. Proctor 53' c Aumua 68' c Con: J. Barrett (3/3) 2', 54', 69'; Pen: J. Barrett (1/1) 40+1'

FMG Stadium Waikato, Hamilton
Attendance: 14,582
Referee: Paul Williams

25 April 2021
15:35 (GMT +12)

(1 BP) Crusaders	29–6	Blues
Try: Jordan (2) 5' c, 72' c Reece 27' m Taylor 59' c Con: Mo'unga (3/4) 7', 60', 74'; Pen: Mo'unga (1/1) 44'	Report	Pen: Black (2/2) 42', 46'

Orangetheory Stadium, Christchurch
Attendance: 17,400
Referee: James Doleman

Bye/s: Highlanders

=== Round 10 ===
30 April 2021
19:05 (GMT +12)

(1 BP) Hurricanes	41–22	Highlanders
Try: Flanders 8' c Coles 38' m Laumape 41' c Kirifi 53' c Iose 71' m Rayasi 78' c Con: J. Barrett (4/6) 9', 43', 54', 79'; Pen: J. Barrett (1/1) 40+3'	Report	Try: Dickson 18' c Nareki 28' c A. Dixon 58' m Con: Gilbert (1/1) 19'; Hunt (1/2) 30'; Pen: Hunt (1/1) 5'

Sky Stadium, Wellington
Attendance: 12,678
Referee: Ben O'Keeffe

1 May 2021
19:05 (GMT +12)

(1 BP) Blues	39–19	Chiefs
Try: Eklund 18' c Choat 26' c Z. Sullivan 53' m Sotutu 74' c A. Lam (2) 78' m, 80+3' m Con: Black (3/6) 19', 26', 75'; Pen: Black (1/1) 65'	Report	Try: Stevenson 61' c Con: Gatland (1/1) 63'; Pen: Gatland (4/4) 4', 22', 40+2, 49'

Eden Park, Auckland
Attendance: 17,940
Referee: Mike Fraser

Bye/s: Crusaders

=== Final ===
8 May 2021
19:05 (GMT +12)

Crusaders	24–13	Chiefs
Try: Reece 7' c Jordan 16' m Con: Mo'unga (1/2) 8'; Pen: Mo'unga (3/3) 37', 69', 76'; Drop: Mo'unga 64'	Report; Summary	Try: McKenzie 20' c Con: McKenzie (1/1) 22'; Pen: McKenzie (2/5) 15', 59'

Orangetheory Stadium, Christchurch
Attendance: 17,100
Referee: Ben O'Keeffe

|}

Crusaders:
FB	15	Will Jordan
RW	14	Sevu Reece	(yellow card) 58' to 68'
OC	13	Leicester Fainga'anuku		(substituted off) 63'
IC	12	David Havili
LW	11	George Bridge
FH	10	Richie Mo'unga
SH	9	Mitchell Drummond		(substituted off) 53'
N8	8	Cullen Grace		(substituted off) 72'
OF	7	Tom Sanders		(substituted off) 56'
BF	6	Ethan Blackadder
RL	5	Sam Whitelock
LL	4	Scott Barrett (c)
TP	3	Michael Alaalatoa		(substituted off) 63'
HK	2	Codie Taylor	(yellow card) 53' to 63'			(substituted off) 76'
LP	1	George Bower		(substituted off) 65'
Substitutes:
HK	16	Brodie McAlister		(substituted on) 56'	(substituted off) 63'	(substituted on) 76'
PR	17	Tamaiti Williams		(substituted on) 65'
PR	18	Oliver Jager		(substituted on) 63'
LK	19	Mitchell Dunshea		(substituted on) 72'
LF	20	Whetu Douglas			(substituted on) 63'
SH	21	Bryn Hall		(substituted on) 53'
CE	22	Dallas McLeod
OB	23	Braydon Ennor		(substituted on) 63'
Coach:
Scott Robertson

Chiefs:
FB	15	Damian McKenzie
RW	14	Jonah Lowe
OC	13	Anton Lienert-Brown
IC	12	Alex Nankivell	(substituted off) 66'
LW	11	Etene Nanai-Seturo
FH	10	Bryn Gatland	(substituted off) 45'
SH	9	Brad Weber (c)	(substituted off) 14'	(substituted on) 26'	(substituted off) 69'
N8	8	Luke Jacobson
OF	7	Lachlan Boshier	(substituted off) 67'
BF	6	Pita Gus Sowakula
RL	5	Mitchell Brown	(substituted off) 41'
LL	4	Tupou Vaa'i
TP	3	Angus Ta'avao	(substituted off) 63'
HK	2	Samisoni Taukei'aho	(substituted off) 63'
LP	1	Aidan Ross	(substituted off) 54'
Substitutes:
HK	16	Bradley Slater	(substituted on) 63'
PR	17	Ollie Norris	(substituted on) 54'
PR	18	Sione Mafileo	(substituted on) 63'
LK	19	Naitoa Ah Kuoi	(substituted on) 41'
LF	20	Zane Kapeli	(substituted on) 67'
SH	21	Te Toiroa Tahuriorangi	(substituted on) 14'	(substituted off) 26'	(substituted on) 69'
CE	22	Rameka Poihipi	(substituted on) 66'
OB	23	Chase Tiatia	(substituted on) 45'
Coach:
Clayton McMillan

Man of the Match:
Richie Mo'unga

Assistant Referees:
James Doleman
Paul Williams
Television match official:
Brendon Pickerill

== Statistics ==
As of 8 May 2021

=== Leading point scorers ===
No.	Player	Team	Points	Average	Details
1	Damian McKenzie	Chiefs	111	13.88	4 T, 17 C, 19 P, 0 D
2	Richie Mo'unga	Crusaders	104	11.56	2 T, 22 C, 15 P, 1 D
3	Jordie Barrett	Hurricanes	95	11.88	3 T, 16 C, 16 P, 0 D
4	Otere Black	Blues	71	8.88	1 T, 18 C, 10 P, 0 D
5	Josh Ioane	Highlanders	47	7.83	2 T, 11 C, 5 P, 0 D
6	Codie Taylor	Crusaders	35	3.89	7 T, 0 C, 0 P, 0 D
7	Mitchell Hunt	Highlanders	32	4.00	1 T, 4 C, 8 P, 0 D
8	Will Jordan	Crusaders	25	3.13	5 T, 0 C, 0 P, 0 D
8	Jona Nareki	Highlanders	25	3.57	5 T, 0 C, 0 P, 0 D
8	Sevu Reece	Crusaders	25	2.78	5 T, 0 C, 0 P, 0 D

Source: Points

=== Leading try scorers ===
No.	Player	Team	Tries	Average
1	Codie Taylor	Crusaders	7	0.78
2	Will Jordan	Crusaders	5	0.63
2	Jona Nareki	Highlanders	5	0.71
2	Sevu Reece	Crusaders	5	0.56
5	Kurt Eklund	Blues	4	0.80
5	Damian McKenzie	Chiefs	4	0.50
7	Asafo Aumua	Hurricanes	3	0.60
7	Jordie Barrett	Hurricanes	3	0.38
7	Connor Garden-Bachop	Highlanders	3	0.50
7	Salesi Rayasi	Hurricanes	3	0.38
7	Hoskins Sotutu	Blues	3	0.38

Source: Tries

=== Discipline ===
Player	Team	Red	Yellow	Round (vs. Opponent)
Alex Hodgman	Blues	1	0	Round 8 (vs. Highlanders)
Du'Plessis Kirifi	Hurricanes	0	2	Round 1 (vs. Blues); Round 6 (vs. Blues)
Ardie Savea	Hurricanes	0	2	Round 2 (vs. Crusaders); Round 6 (vs. Blues)
Scott Barrett	Crusaders	0	1	Round 1 (vs. Highlanders)
Ethan Blackadder	Crusaders	0	1	Round 1 (vs. Highlanders)
James Blackwell	Hurricanes	0	1	Round 1 (vs. Blues)
Dane Coles	Hurricanes	0	1	Round 10 (vs. Highlanders)
Josh Dickson	Highlanders	0	1	Round 3 (vs. Blues)
Ash Dixon	Highlanders	0	1	Round 2 (vs. Chiefs)
Mitchell Hunt	Highlanders	0	1	Round 10 (vs. Hurricanes)
Ngani Laumape	Hurricanes	0	1	Round 7 (vs. Crusaders)
Tyrel Lomax	Hurricanes	0	1	Round 5 (vs. Highlanders)
Sam Nock	Blues	0	1	Round 3 (vs. Highlanders)
Sevu Reece	Crusaders	0	1	Final (vs. Chiefs)
Hoskins Sotutu	Blues	0	1	Round 8 (vs. Highlanders)
Codie Taylor	Crusaders	0	1	Final (vs. Chiefs)
Sio Tomkinson	Highlanders	0	1	Round 2 (vs. Chiefs)
Ofa Tu'ungafasi	Blues	0	1	Round 4 (vs. Crusaders)
Brad Weber	Chiefs	0	1	Round 3 (vs. Crusaders)

== Players ==
=== Squads ===
The following 2021 Super Rugby Aotearoa squads have been named. Players listed in italics denote non-original squad members.

Blues squad
Forwards	Leni Apisai • Adrian Choat • Gerard Cowley-Tuioti • Sam Darry • Kurt Eklund • Blake Gibson • Josh Goodhue • Alex Hodgman • Dillon Hunt • Akira Ioane • Nepo Laulala • James Lay • Ray Niuia • Dalton Papalii • Jacob Pierce • Taine Plumtree • Marcel Renata • Tom Robinson • Hoskins Sotutu • Luteru Tolai • Karl Tu'inukuafe • Patrick Tuipulotu • Ofa Tu'ungafasi • Soane Vikena
Backs	Otere Black • Finlay Christie • Caleb Clarke • TJ Faiane • Bryce Heem • Rieko Ioane • AJ Lam • Jone Macilai-Tori • Emoni Narawa • Sam Nock • Stephen Perofeta • Harry Plummer • Jacob Ratumaitavuki-Kneepkens • Jonathan Ruru • Zarn Sullivan • Mark Tele'a • Tanielu Teleʻa
Coach	Leon MacDonald

Chiefs squad
Forwards	Naitoa Ah Kuoi • Joe Apikotoa • Kaylum Boshier • Lachlan Boshier • Mitchell Brown • Sam Cane • Samipeni Finau • Tom Florence • Nathan Harris • Luke Jacobson • Zane Kapeli • Mitchell Karpik • Ezekiel Lindenmuth • Josh Lord • Sione Mafileo • Laghlan McWhannell • Liam Messam • Atu Moli • Ollie Norris • Reuben O'Neill • Simon Parker • Aidan Ross • Bradley Slater • Pita Gus Sowakula • Angus Ta'avao • Samisoni Taukei'aho • Viliami Taulani • Tupou Vaa'i
Backs	Bryn Gatland • Anton Lienert-Brown • Jonah Lowe • Damian McKenzie • Etene Nanai-Seturo • Alex Nankivell • Rameka Poihipi • Rivez Reihana • Xavier Roe • Shaun Stevenson • Bailyn Sullivan • Te Toiroa Tahuriorangi • Chase Tiatia • Kaleb Trask • Quinn Tupaea • Sean Wainui • Brad Weber • Gideon Wrampling
Coach	Clayton McMillan

Crusaders squad
Forwards	Michael Alaalatoa • Scott Barrett • Ethan Blackadder • George Bower • Tom Christie • Whetu Douglas • Mitchell Dunshea • Cullen Grace • Sione Havili • Oliver Jager • Andrew Makalio • Brodie McAlister • Joe Moody • Fletcher Newell • Luke Romano • Tom Sanders • Quinten Strange • Codie Taylor • Isi Tu'ungafasi • Nathan Vella • Sam Whitelock • Tamaiti Williams
Backs	George Bridge • Fergus Burke • Brett Cameron • Mitchell Drummond • Ere Enari • Braydon Ennor • Leicester Fainga'anuku • Chay Fihaki • Jack Goodhue • Bryn Hall • David Havili • Will Jordan • Manasa Mataele • Josh McKay • Dallas McLeod • Richie Mo'unga • Isaiah Punivai • Rene Ranger • Sevu Reece
Coach	Scott Robertson

Highlanders squad
Forwards	Jermaine Ainsley • Teariki Ben-Nicholas • Liam Coltman • Ethan de Groot • Josh Dickson • Ash Dixon • Bryn Evans • Shannon Frizell • Billy Harmon • Kazuki Himeno • Josh Hohneck • Ricky Jackson • Ayden Johnstone • James Lentjes • Daniel Lienert-Brown • Marino Mikaele-Tu'u • Sione Misiloi • Pari Pari Parkinson • Jack Regan • Hugh Renton • Manaaki Selby-Rickit • Liam Squire • Jeff Thwaites • Siate Tokolahi
Backs	Solomon Alaimalo • James Arscott • Michael Collins • Folau Fakatava • Connor Garden-Bachop • Sam Gilbert • Scott Gregory • Kayne Hammington • Mitchell Hunt • Josh Ioane • Vilimoni Koroi • Caleb Makene • Nehe Milner-Skudder • Josh Moorby • Jona Nareki • Fetuli Paea • Ngane Punivai • Aaron Smith • Josh Timu • Sio Tomkinson • Thomas Umaga-Jensen • Freedom Vahaakolo
Coach	Tony Brown

Hurricanes squad
Forwards	Fraser Armstrong • Asafo Aumua • James Blackwell • Dane Coles • Gareth Evans • Alex Fidow • Vaea Fifita • Devan Flanders • Brayden Iose • Du'Plessis Kirifi • Kane Le'aupepe • Tyrel Lomax • Tevita Mafileo • Liam Mitchell • Xavier Numia • James O'Reilly • Reed Prinsep • Pouri Rakete-Stones • Ricky Riccitelli • Ardie Savea • Scott Scrafton • Isaia Walker-Leawere
Backs	Vince Aso • Jordie Barrett • Jamie Booth • Luke Campbell • Jackson Garden-Bachop • Wes Goosen • Simon Hickey • Ngani Laumape • Orbyn Leger • Ruben Love • Pepesana Patafilo • Billy Proctor • Salesi Rayasi • Cameron Roigard • Julian Savea • Jonathan Taumateine • Danny Toala • Peter Umaga-Jensen • Lolagi Visinia
Coach	Jason Holland

== Referees ==
The following referees were selected to officiate the 2021 Super Rugby Aotearoa season:

2021 Super Rugby Aotearoa referees
- James Doleman
- Mike Fraser
- Ben O'Keeffe
- Brendon Pickerill
- Paul Williams
