= Kailea =

Kailea is a surname. Notable people with the surname include:

- Isaac Aedo Kailea (born 2000), Australian rugby union player
- Ualosi Kailea (born 1978), Tongan rugby union player
