= Nathan Mauger =

NZ rugby union player

- Born: Nathan Keith Mauger; 8 April 1978 (age 48) Christchurch, New Zealand
- Height: 1.84 m (6 ft 1/2 in)
- Weight: 98 kg (15 st 6 lb)
- School: Christchurch Boys' High School
- Notable relative(s): Aaron Mauger (brother); Graeme Bachop (uncle); Stephen Bachop (uncle); Ivan Mauger (uncle); Connor Garden-Bachop (cousin); Jackson Garden-Bachop (cousin)
- Occupation: Professional rugby union player

Rugby union career
- Position: Centre
Amateur team(s)
Years	Team	Apps	(Points)
- Linwood Rugby Club
Senior career
Years	Team	Apps	(Points)
2004–2005	Gloucester Rugby	11	(10)
Provincial / State sides
Years	Team	Apps	(Points)
1998–2004	Canterbury	38	(140)
- Correct as of 2014-06-20
Super Rugby
Years	Team	Apps	(Points)
1999–2004	Crusaders	29	(20)
International career
Years	Team	Apps	(Points)
2008	New Zealand	0	(0)

Nathan Keith Mauger (born 8 April 1978) is a rugby union player. He spent the entirety of his Super Rugby career with the Canterbury Crusaders. He played for the All Blacks in 2002 in which he played 2 games but never played a test. He made his debut against Ireland A and played his latest game against Scotland A. His position is centre. He is the brother of All Black, Aaron Mauger. Mauger scored an NPC record 12 tries in the 2001 season for Canterbury.

As well as playing for the Crusaders, Mauger also played for Gloucester in England, Treviso in Italy and Ricoh in France. Mauger returned to Christchurch, New Zealand, in 2008 where he has started a Rugby Academy.

Nathan briefly coached the Chinese-Taipei sevens team in Taiwan on a 12-week contract from September to December 2013. He is now an assistant coach with the Sunwolves, a Japan-based side that entered Super Rugby in 2016.
