= Hagley College =

- Te Puna Wai O Waipapa
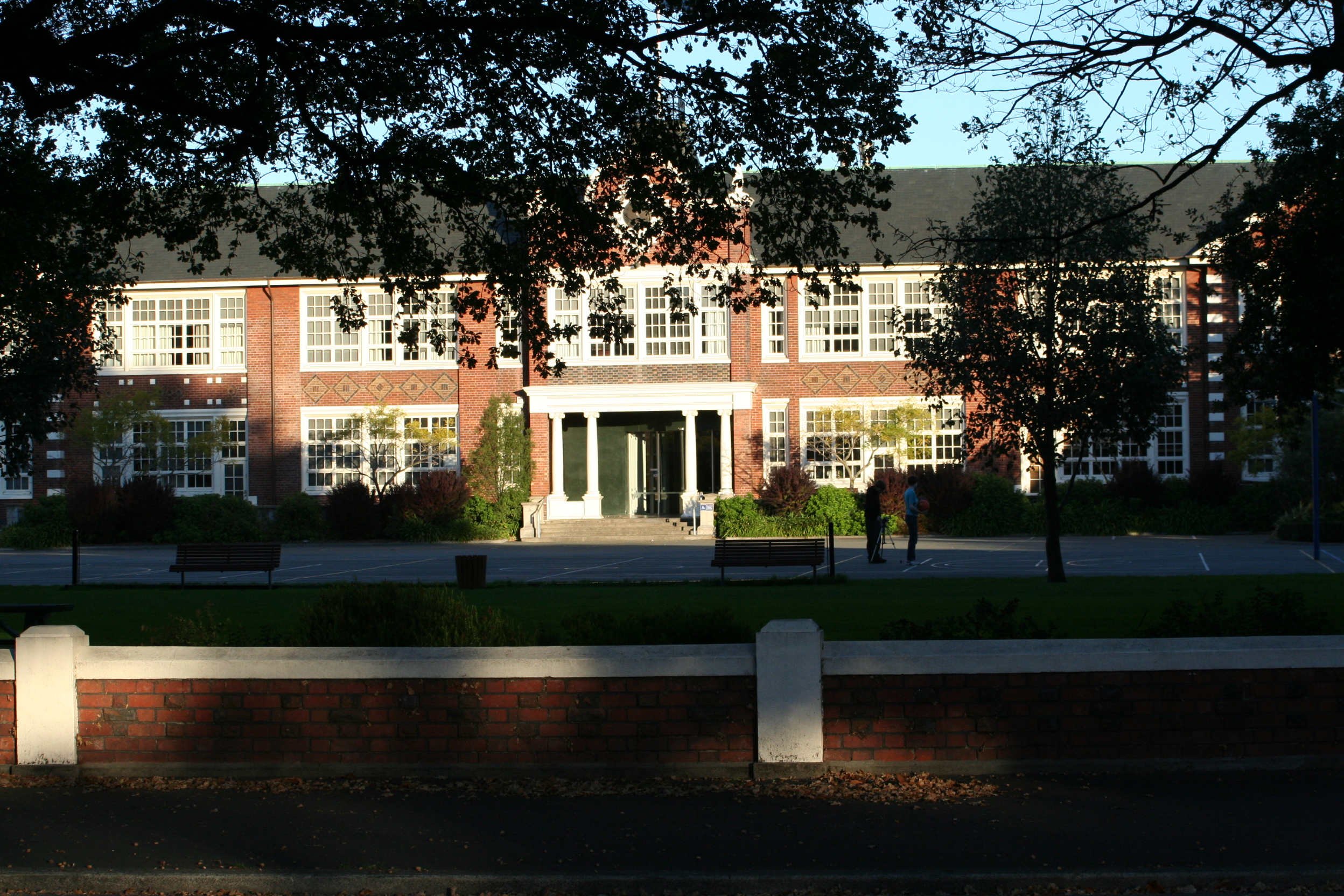
- Hagley College in 2008

Location
- 510 Hagley Avenue, Christchurch; 43.5377°S 172.6234°E

Information
- Type: State co-ed Secondary (Years 9–15)
- Established: 1966
- Ministry of Education Institution no.: 336
- Principal: Rowan Milburn
- Enrolment: 2,037 (July 2026)
- Socio-economic decile: 6N
- Website: hagley.school.nz

Hagley College (previously Hagley Community College and Hagley High School), is a state secondary school in inner-city Christchurch, New Zealand. Prior to 1966 the school was Christchurch West High School, which was founded in 1858.

== Enrolment ==
As of July 2026, Hagley College has roll of 2,037 students, of which 191 (9.4%) identify as Māori.

As of 2026, the school has an Equity Index of 468, placing it amongst schools whose students have average socioeconomic barriers to achievement (roughly equivalent to decile 4 under the former socio-economic decile system).

== Description ==
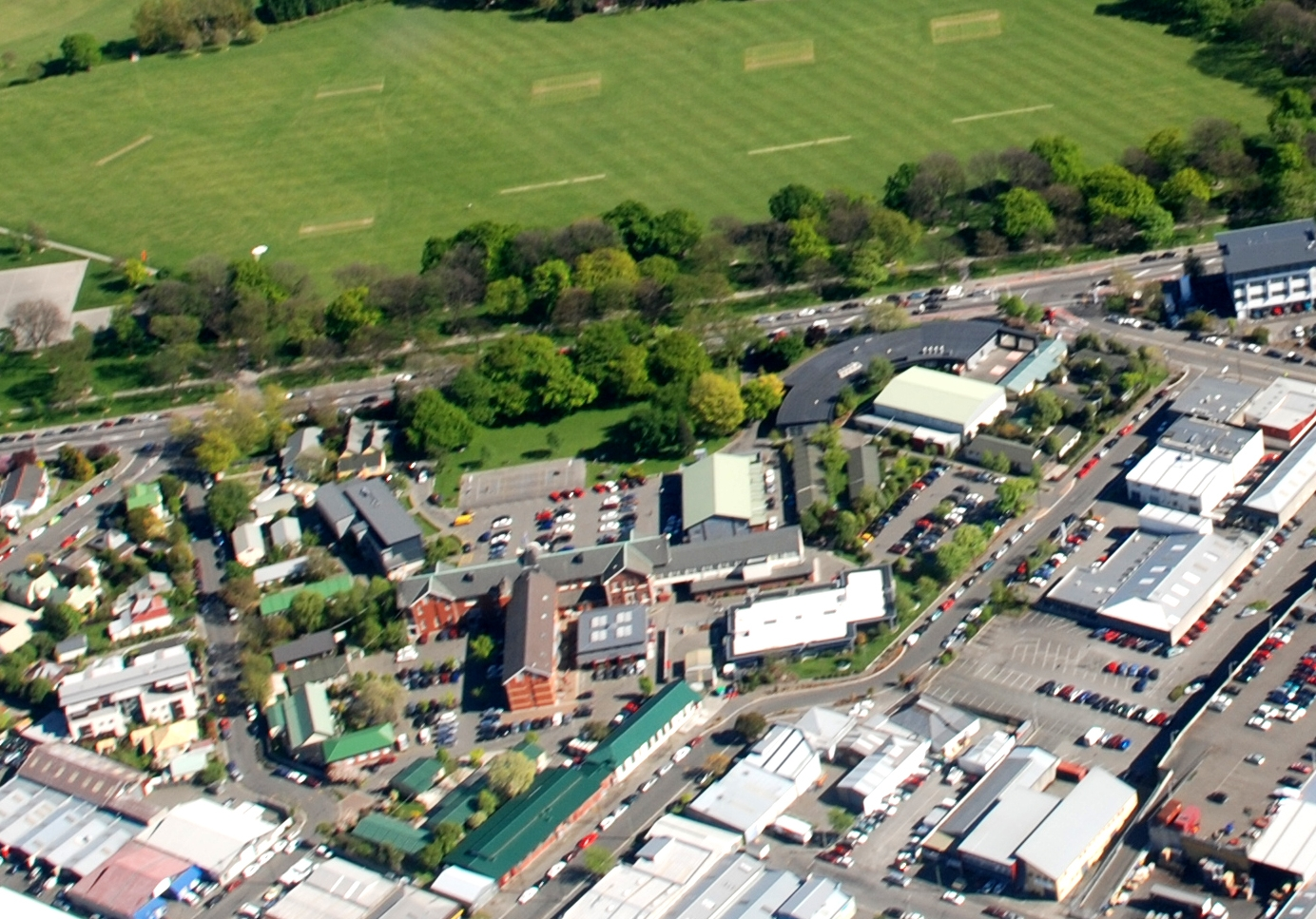
Aerial photo of Hagley Community College

Unlike most New Zealand high schools there is no uniform requirement and students may address their teachers on a first name basis. Over 92% of students leave with qualifications and a substantially greater proportion than the national average go on to graduate from a New Zealand university.

The 1950s school hall has been transformed into a theatre, and former rooms of the school are now in use as a dance studio and drama studio. As well as the usual NCEA subjects, Hagley offers several specialised programmes, including Early Childhood Education, Hagley Dance Company, Hagley Writers' Institute and Hagley School of Cuisine.

The school is listed with the New Zealand Qualifications Authority.

== Main building ==
The school's main building was registered as a heritage building by the New Zealand Historic Places Trust (now Heritage New Zealand) on 26 November 1981 with registration number 1874 classified as C. With the change of the classification system, the building later became a Category II listing.

Principal Brent Ingram lobbied the Ministry of Education in the 1990s to have the main building earthquake-strengthened. The double-brick building dating from 1924 was an earthquake risk, as reports first identified in the 1960s. When the Ministry disagreed, Ingram took the case first to the Ombudsman and then filed proceedings in the High Court before the Ministry relented and agreed to the strengthening. About NZ$4.2m was spent on the strengthening work. The building came through the February 2011 Christchurch earthquake reasonably unharmed and, according to Ingram, "didn't lose a brick".

== Principals ==
Principals of Hagley College
Principal	Years	Notes
Thomas Richards	?–1970	Name change from Christchurch West High School to Hagley High School in 1966
Ian Leggat	1971–1975	Introduction of adult students in 1974
Rosamund "Ros" Heinz	1976–1991	Dropped uniform requirement for senior students.
Brent Ingram	1991–2015	During his time, the roll increased from 900 to 2300 pupils.
Mike Fowler	2015–2021	Teacher at Hagley since 1987. Deputy principal since 2009
Rowan Milburn	2022–present	

== Notable alumni ==
- Graeme Bachop, (born 1967) international rugby union player for All Blacks (1987–95) and Japan (1999) and Canterbury (1985–94)
- Stephen Bachop (born 1966), international rugby union player for Samoa (1991–99) and All Blacks (1994) and Canterbury (1986–91)
- Reb Fountain (born 1973), folk musician and singer-songwriter
- Jarred Christmas (born 1980), comedian active in the United Kingdom
- Sandra Manderson, retired police officer and police commander
