= Waisake Sotutu =

Fijian rugby union player (born 1970)

- Born: Waisake Ryder R. Sotutu; 11 November 1970 (age 56) Suva, Fiji
- Height: 6 ft 1 in (185 cm)
- Weight: 238 lb (108 kg)
- School: Wesley College, Auckland
- Notable relative: Hoskins Sotutu (son)

Rugby union career
- Position(s): Wing, Centre, Prop
Amateur team(s)
Years	Team	Apps	(Points)
–	Wesley College		
–	Marist		
Senior career
Years	Team	Apps	(Points)
1998-1999	Yamaha Jubilo		
Provincial / State sides
Years	Team	Apps	(Points)
1989	Counties Manukau	1	(0)
1991-97	Auckland	85	(179)
Super Rugby
Years	Team	Apps	(Points)
1996	Blues	4	(5)
International career
Years	Team	Apps	(Points)
1999	Fiji	12	(10)
1995	New Zealand XV	1	(0)

Waisake Sotutu (born in Suva, on 11 November 1970) is a Fijian former rugby union player. He played as wing and as centre.

== Career ==
Sotutu played for Wesley College, Auckland, and then, for Marist. He later played the National Provincial Championship for Counties Manukau in 1989, and then, for Auckland between 1991 and 1997. Sotutu also took part at the first Super 12 season with the Auckland Blues. Later, he went to play in Japan for Yamaha Jubilo.

Sotutu's first cap for Fiji was during the test match against Canada, on 15 May 1999 in Vancouver. He would later be called for the 1999 Rugby World Cup roster, playing 4 matches at the tournament. His last test cap was against England in Twickenham, on 20 October 1999. Sotutu was also an All Black trialist in 1995 and played for a non-cap New Zealand XV in 1995.

== After career ==
As of 2014, Sotutu was appointed as coach for Auckland Rugby sevens team.

== Personal life ==
He is the father of the rugby union player Hoskins Sotutu and of the netball player Teuila Sotutu.
