= Bill Hayward (rugby union) =

American rugby union player

- Born: Bill Hayward
- University: Loughborough University

Rugby union career
- Position: Fullback
Senior career
Years	Team	Apps	(Points)
- Tunbridge Wells
–	Loughborough Students		
–	Maryland Exiles		
International career
Years	Team	Apps	(Points)
1991	United States	2	(0)

Bill Hayward is a former rugby union international who represented United States of America in 1991.

== Early life ==
Bill Hayward studied at Loughborough University and was a member of the Loughborough Students RUFC.

== Rugby union career ==
Hayward made his international debut on May 4, 1991 at Rockne Stadium, Chicago in the United States vs Japan match. Of the matches he played for his national side he was on the winning side on one occasion. He played his final match for United States of America on June 8, 1991 at Kingsland, Calgary in a Canada vs USA match.
