= Brian LeMay =

American rugby union footballer (born 1983)

- Born: 26 May 1983 (age 43) United States
- Height: 185 cm (6 ft 1 in)
- Weight: 113 kg (249 lb; 17 st 11 lb)

Rugby union career
- Position: Prop
International career
Years	Team	Apps	(Points)
2008	United States	1	(0)
- Correct as of 5 May 2021

Brian LeMay (born 26 May 1983) was a United States rugby union player. His playing position was prop. He was selected as a reserve for the United States at the 2007 Rugby World Cup, but did not make an appearance. He though did make 1 international appearance for the United States against Japan in 2008.

LeMay starred on the football and hockey teams at White Bear Lake High School in White Bear Lake, Minnesota, graduating in 2001. He attended the U.S. Air Force Academy, where he played fullback and linebacker on the Falcons football team. After being asked by the coaching staff to switch to center, LeMay decided to join the school's rugby team. He went on to play for the Boston Irish Wolfhounds for three years before returning to the Air Force Academy to coach the club team.
