= Connor Garden-Bachop =

New Zealand rugby union player (1999–2024)

- Born: 19 April 1999
- Died: 17 June 2024 (aged 25)
- Height: 188 cm (6 ft 2 in)
- Weight: 92 kg (203 lb; 14 st 7 lb)
- School: Scots College
- Notable relative(s): Stephen Bachop (father); Sue Garden-Bachop (mother); Jackson Garden-Bachop (brother); Graeme Bachop (uncle); Aaron Mauger (cousin); Nathan Mauger (cousin); Ivan Mauger (great uncle)

Rugby union career
- Position(s): Wing, Fullback
- Current team: Wellington, Highlanders
Senior career
Years	Team	Apps	(Points)
2018	Canterbury	3	(10)
2019–2024	Wellington	19	(25)
2021–2024	Highlanders	30	(30)
- Correct as of 22 October 2022
International career
Years	Team	Apps	(Points)
2022	Māori All Blacks	2	(0)
- Correct as of 22 October 2022

Connor Christian Garden-Bachop (19 April 1999 – 17 June 2024) was a New Zealand rugby union player who played for the Highlanders in Super Rugby. His regular playing position was wing. He signed for the Highlanders squad in 2020.

== Career ==
Connor Garden-Bachop was born on 19 April 1999. He attended Scots College in Wellington before joining Canterbury in the Mitre 10 Cup and subsequently Wellington in 2019. He was signed by the Highlanders in 2020 and made his debut against the Crusaders in 2021. In his first five Super Rugby games he scored three tries.

== Personal life ==
Garden-Bachop was a New Zealander of European, Samoan, Tahitian, Cook Island and Māori descent (Ngāti Awa descent). He died due to a "medical event" on 17 June 2024, at the age of 25.
