= Jonathan Vitale =

US international rugby union player

- Born: March 11, 1981 (age 45) Canton, Ohio, U.S.
- Height: 1.85 m (6 ft 1 in)
- Weight: 115 kg (254 lb)

Rugby union career
- Position: Prop
Senior career
Years	Team	Apps	(Points)
-	Chicago Lions	-	(-)
International career
Years	Team	Apps	(Points)
2007	United States	3	(0)

Jonathan Vitale (born March 11, 1981, in Canton, Ohio) is a former American rugby union prop. He was a member of the United States national rugby union team that participated in the 2007 Rugby World Cup.
