= Takahiro Sugiura =

Japanese rugby union player

- Born: 4 October 1983 (age 43) Aichi, Japan
- Height: 1.77 m (5 ft 10 in)
- Weight: 105 kg (231 lb; 16 st 7 lb)

Rugby union career
- Position: Prop
Senior career
Years	Team	Apps	(Points)
2010–2018	Munakata Sanix Blues	71	(60)
- Correct as of 6 May 2021
International career
Years	Team	Apps	(Points)
2007	Japan	1	(0)
- Correct as of 6 May 2021

Takahiro Sugiura (杉浦敬宏, Sugiura Takahiro; born 4 October 1983) is a former Japanese rugby union player who played as a prop. He spent his whole career playing for Munakata Sanix Blues in Japan's domestic Top League, playing over 70 times. He was named as a backup player for Japan for the 2007 Rugby World Cup. He did though make one appearance for Japan.
