= Inaki Basauri =

US international rugby union player

- Born: 1 October 1984 (age 42) Monterrey, Mexico
- Height: 6 ft 5 in (196 cm)
- Weight: 232 lb (105 kg)
- Occupation: Professional rugby union player

Rugby union career
- Position: Loose forward
Amateur team(s)
| Years | Team | Apps | (Points) |
| 1999–2002 | Maryland Exiles | | |
Senior career
| Years | Team | Apps | (Points) |
| 2003–2007 | RC Massy | 15 | (0) |
| 2007–2008 | US Marmande | 16 | (10) |
| 2008–2009 | SU Agen | 5 | (0) |
| 2009–2010 | CA Lannemezan | 22 | (0) |
| 2010–2011 | L'Aquila | 5 | (0) |
| 2011–2012 | CA Perigueux | 23 | (5) |
| 2012–2015 | Tarbes Pyrenees | 47 | (5) |
| 2016–2017 | Stade Nantais | 14 | (0) |
- Correct as of 6 June 2020
International career
| Years | Team | Apps | (Points) |
| 2001–2003 | United States U19 | | |
| 2007–2012 | United States | 15 | (0) |
- Correct as of 1 January 2014

Inaki Basauri (born 1 October 1984) is a Mexico-born former American rugby union player who played most of his career in the Pro D2.

== Career ==
=== Early career ===
Basauri first started playing rugby when he was 15 and was invited to a practice by his friend. Inaki graduated from Walt Whitman High School in Bethesda, Maryland in 2002. Throughout high school, he played rugby sevens with the Maryland Exiles in the summer and varsity football in the fall. He played for the U-19 National Team at age 16 and vice-captained the USA U-19 Tour to France for the World Championships. After the France U-19 World Championships, he was recruited by Massy to play for their U-21 Team.

=== Professional career ===
At 23, he played professionally for SU Agen in France and was the youngest starter of the team. He also played in Italy for the L'Aquila Rugby club in the Super 10 competition. Having previously played in France with CA Lannemezan, SU Agen and CA Perigueux. Basauri returned with Tarbes in the Pro D2 where he made 47 appearances over three years. In July 2015 Basauri signed a contract with Stade Nantais of the Fédérale 2. Basauri was also a member of the USA 2007 Rugby World Cup and 2011 Rugby World Cup squads.

=== Coaching career ===
Following his playing career Basauri coached Nantes, Le Rheu, and Le XV de L’Erdre in France, and also served as the forwards and defense coach for Denmark. He received his coaching diploma from the French Rugby Federation (FFR).
