= Graeme Bachop =

Japan & NZ international rugby union player

- Born: Graeme Thomas Miro Bachop; 11 June 1967 (age 59) Christchurch, New Zealand
- Height: 1.77 m (5 ft 10 in)
- Weight: 82 kg (12 st 13 lb)
- School: Hagley High School
- Notable relative(s): Stephen Bachop (brother); Nathan Mauger (nephew); Aaron Mauger (nephew); Connor Garden-Bachop (nephew); Jackson Garden-Bachop (nephew); Sue Garden-Bachop (sister-in-law)

Rugby union career
- Position: Halfback
Amateur team(s)
Years	Team	Apps	(Points)
1985–1994	Linwood		
1994–1997	Christchurch HSOB		
–	Lyttelton		
Senior career
Years	Team	Apps	(Points)
1997–1999	Fukuoka Sanix Blues		
Provincial / State sides
Years	Team	Apps	(Points)
1985–1994	Canterbury		
International career
Years	Team	Apps	(Points)
1987–1995	New Zealand	31	(18)
1999	Japan	8	(0)

Graeme Thomas Miro Bachop (born 11 June 1967) is a former rugby union footballer from New Zealand.

== Career ==
Bachop made his All Blacks debut against Japan B in Tokyo on 21 October 1987, his first international debut was against Wales on 4 November 1989.

He played at the 1991 and 1995 Rugby World Cup. In 1999 Bachop played for Japan at the 1999 Rugby World Cup.

== All Blacks statistics ==
- Tests: 31 (0 as Captain)
- Games: 23 (0 as Captain)
- Total Matches: 54 (0 as Captain)
- Test Points: 18pts (4t, 0c, 0p, 0dg, 0m)
- Game Points: 61pts (15t, 0c, 0p, 0dg, 0m)
- Total Points: 79pts (19t, 0c, 0p, 0dg, 0m)

== See also ==
- High School Old Boys RFC
