= Hoskins Sotutu =

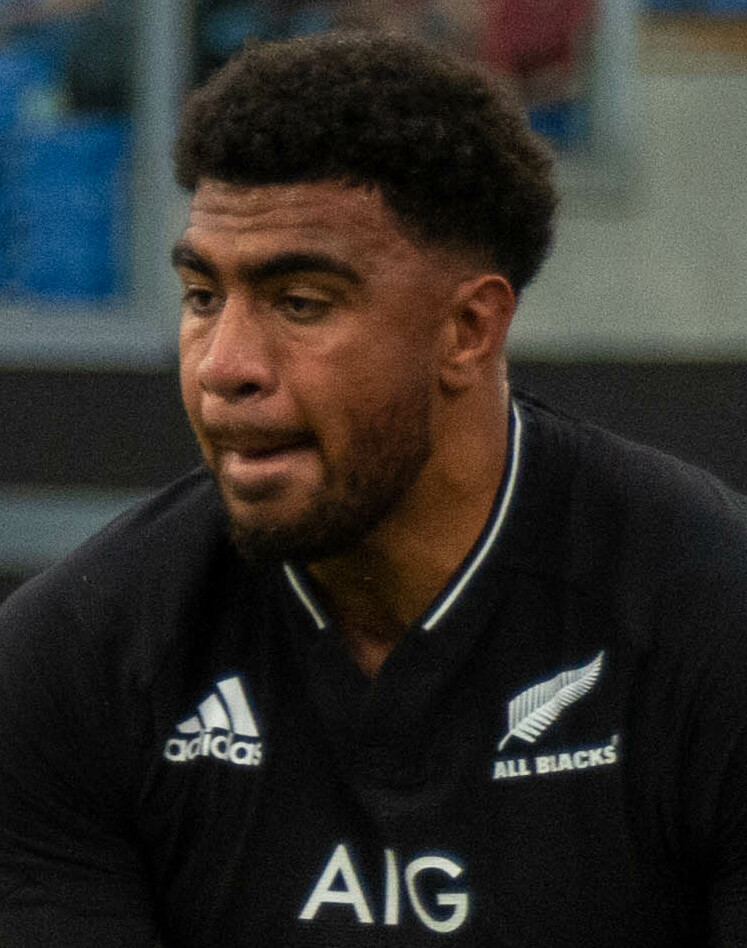
- Sotutu in 2021
- Full name: Hoskins Colin Ryder Sotutu
- Born: 12 July 1998 (age 28) Auckland, New Zealand
- Height: 192 cm (6 ft 4 in)
- Weight: 112 kg (247 lb; 17 st 9 lb)
- School: Sacred Heart College
- University: Harvard College

Rugby union career
- Position(s): Number 8, Flanker
- Current team: Blues, Counties Manukau
Senior career
Years	Team	Apps	(Points)
2018–2020	Auckland	17	(10)
2019–2026	Blues	86	(160)
2021–2026	Counties Manukau	29	(25)
2026–	Newcastle Red Bulls	0	(0)
- Correct as of 18 April 2026
International career
Years	Team	Apps	(Points)
2018	New Zealand U20s	6	(0)
2020	North Island	1	(0)
2020–2024	New Zealand	14	(10)
2025	ANZAC XV	1	(0)
- Correct as of 7 June 2024

Hoskins Colin Ryder Sotutu (born 12 July 1998) is a New Zealand rugby union player who plays for Newcastle Red Bulls in PREM Rugby. His playing position is flanker.

== Early life and education ==
Sotutu is the son of former Fiji rugby union centre and winger, Waisake Sotutu. His mother is English.

== Rugby playing career ==
His performance for the Blues in Super Rugby Aotearoa resulted in a call-up to the All Blacks squad in 2020. Sotutu made his debut for New Zealand off the bench against Australia in the first Bledisloe Cup test on 11 October 2020.

In October 2024, Sotutu was called into the All Blacks squad for the November internationals, but rejected the offer, opening up speculation that he will be moving to the UK with the view to play for England. Having last played for the All Blacks in November 2022, Sotutu will become eligible to switch international allegiances to England or Fiji in 2026 as he qualifies for the former through his mother and the latter through his father.

On 23 December 2025, Sotutu would officially leave New Zealand to move to England to join Newcastle Red Bulls in the Premiership Rugby competition on a three-year deal from the 2026-27 season.
