= Tyson Meek =

US international rugby union player

- Born: 21 April 1980 (age 46) Plano, Texas
- Height: 171 cm (5 ft 7 in)
- Weight: 77 kg (170 lb; 12 st 2 lb)

Rugby union career
- Position: Scrum-half
International career
Years	Team	Apps	(Points)
2006	United States	4	(0)
- Correct as of 5 May 2021

Tyson Meek (born 21 April 1980) is an American former rugby union player. His playing position was scrum-half. He was selected as a reserve for the United States at the 2007 Rugby World Cup, but did not make an appearance. He though made 4 appearances for the United States during 2006.
