= Owen Lentz =

US international rugby union player

- Born: Owen Lentz; 24 January 1980 (age 46) King William's Town, South Africa

Rugby union career
- Position: hooker
Senior career
Years	Team	Apps	(Points)
- Maryland Exiles
International career
Years	Team	Apps	(Points)
2006–2007	United States	8	(0)
- Correct as of 31 December 2020
Coaching career
- Years: Team
- Potomac Exiles

Owen Lentz (born 24 January 1980) is a former South African-born American rugby union player. He played for Maryland Exiles and gained 8 caps since his debut in 2006 for the American national side. Lentz played as a hooker or occasionally as flanker.

Lentz represented South Africa at under-21 level before switching allegiance to the US.
