= Aaron Mauger =

NZ international rugby union player

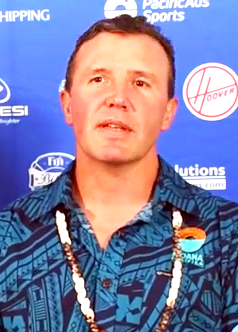
- Mauger in 2023
- Born: Aaron Joseph Douglas Mauger; 29 November 1980 (age 45) Christchurch, New Zealand
- Height: 6 ft 0 in (1.83 m)
- Weight: 14 st 9 lb (93 kg)
- School: Christchurch Boys' High School
- Notable relative(s): Nathan Mauger (brother); Graeme Bachop (uncle); Stephen Bachop (uncle); Ivan Mauger (uncle); Connor Garden-Bachop (cousin); Jackson Garden-Bachop (cousin)
- Occupation: Rugby coach

Rugby union career
- Position(s): First five-eighth, Centre
Senior career
Years	Team	Apps	(Points)
1999–2006	Canterbury	42	(75)
2000–2007	Crusaders	89	(154)
2007–2010	Leicester Tigers	50	(42)
- Correct as of 23 January 2010
International career
Years	Team	Apps	(Points)
1999–2001	New Zealand Colts	10	(29)
2001–2007	New Zealand	46	(100)
- Correct as of 29 December 2007
Coaching career
- Years: Team
- 2013–2015: Crusaders (assistant)
- 2015–2017: Leicester Tigers
- 2017: Samoa (assistant)
- 2018–2020: Highlanders
- 2022–2023: Moana Pasifika
- 2024-: Fiji (assistant)

Aaron Joseph Douglas Mauger (May-jər; born 29 November 1980) is a New Zealand professional rugby union coach and former player.

== Playing career ==
Born in Christchurch, Mauger played first five-eighth and second five-eighth for Canterbury (Air New Zealand Cup), the Crusaders (Super Rugby) and the All Blacks. He joined the Leicester Tigers at the end of the 2007 Rugby World Cup after signing a two-and-a-half-year contract with the English side.

Mauger captained the New Zealand under-21 team to success in the international under-21 tournaments in 2000 and 2001. He made his All Blacks debut in 2001.

He is the younger brother of Nathan Mauger and his uncles are former All Blacks Graeme Bachop and Stephen Bachop. His great-uncle, Ivan Mauger, was a six-time Speedway World Champion.

In March 2010, Mauger announced his retirement due to a back injury. He had attended clinics in the United Kingdom and Germany in his bid to overcome the injury but had been unable to complete training sessions without breaking down.

== Coaching ==
In June 2010, Mauger returned with his family to his native New Zealand, intending to stay involved in rugby through union coaching. Following a period of coaching with the Crusaders, it was announced that Mauger had signed a three-year deal (starting in the 2015–16 season) with Leicester Tigers for the vacant head coach role. The role was previously held by Matt O'Connor who left in 2013 to be head coach at Leinster.

=== Highlanders ===
On 1 August 2017 Mauger was named head coach of the Highlanders, taking over from previous head coach Tony Brown.

For the 2018 Super Rugby season the Highlanders won 10 of 16 games, with points for 437 to 445 against, to be placed 6th. They lost to the New South Wales Waratahs 23–30 in their quarter-final match at Sydney. His assistant coaches were Mark Hammett and Glenn Delaney.

In the 2019 season the Highlanders under Mauger won 6 and drew 2 matches (Chiefs, Bulls) and were awarded a 0–0 draw for their scheduled match against the Crusaders which was cancelled due to the Christchurch Mosque shootings. This placed them 8th. The points scored were 441 and 392 against. They lost their quarter-final to the eventual champions, the Crusaders, by 14–38 at Christchurch. Clarke Dermody had joined Hammett and Delaney as an Assistant Coach.

In a 2020 season disrupted by COVID-19, the Highlanders won 1 (the Brumbies at Canberra) of their 5 Super Rugby games and they were awarded a 0–0 draw for their cancelled match against the Jaguares. They had a points for and against deficit of 91 to 163, prior to cessation of that competition. During Super Rugby Aotearoa the Highlanders were 4th after winning 3 from 8 and a points deficit of 197 points for to 227 against. Riki Flutey had joined as assistant coach.

Mauger's head coach position was not renewed and he was replaced by Tony Brown.
