= Andrew Osborne (rugby union, born 1981) =

United States rugby union player and coach

- Full name: Andrew Tui Osborne
- Born: 4 March 1981 (age 45) Fiji
- Height: 173 cm (5 ft 8 in)
- Weight: 88 kg (194 lb; 13 st 12 lb)

Rugby union career
- Position: Fullback
International career
Years	Team	Apps	(Points)
2007	United States	2	(0)
- Correct as of 5 May 2021

Andrew Osborne (born 4 March 1981 in Fiji) is a Fijian-born former United States rugby union player and coach. His playing position was fullback. He was selected as a reserve for the United States at the 2007 Rugby World Cup, but did not make an appearance. He though made 2 appearances for the United States in 2007.
