= Stephen Bachop =

New Zealand and Samoa international rugby union player

- Born: Stephen John Bachop; 2 April 1966 (age 60) Christchurch, New Zealand
- Height: 1.78 m (5 ft 10 in)
- Weight: 92 kg (14 st 7 lb; 203 lb)
- School: Hagley High School
- Notable relative(s): Connor Garden-Bachop (son); Jackson Garden-Bachop (son); Graeme Bachop (brother); Nathan Mauger (nephew); Aaron Mauger (nephew)
- Occupation: Rugby union coach

Rugby union career
- Position: First five-eighth
Amateur team(s)
Years	Team	Apps	(Points)
1986-91	Linwood	-	
1992-96	Southern	-	
1997-98	Te Kawau		
Senior career
Years	Team	Apps	(Points)
1991	Lazio		
1992–96	Otago	79	
1997–98	Central Vikings	22	(34)
1998–00	London Irish	32	(23)
2000–02	Leeds	42	(52)
–	Blackrock College		
Provincial / State sides
Years	Team	Apps	(Points)
1986–91	Canterbury	80	
Super Rugby
Years	Team	Apps	(Points)
1996	Highlanders	10	(10)
1997–98	Hurricanes	21	(15)
International career
Years	Team	Apps	(Points)
1991–99	Samoa	18	(64)
1994	New Zealand	5	(0)
Coaching career
- Years: Team
- 2000–02: Leeds (assistant)
- 2002: Wellington Lions
- 2003: Wellington U19
- 2004–05: Wellington B (asst.)
- 2005-present: International Rugby Academy New Zealand

Stephen John Bachop (born 2 April 1966) is a New Zealand former rugby union player and current coach. He is the older brother of fellow former All Black, Graeme Bachop.

== Rugby career ==
Following the 1985 season, Bachop was selected as one of the "Five promising players" in the Rugby Almanack of New Zealand. He made his debut for Canterbury in the 1986 South Pacific Championship match against Auckland in which he marked All Black Grant Fox. As with his predecessor at Canterbury, Wayne Smith, Bachop was not a goal kicker and this was the role of Robbie Deans.

Bachop had two spells in the National Provincial Championship with each Canterbury and Otago, and also played for the Highlanders in the first Super 12 season in 1996. He then moved north in 1997 and for the next two seasons played with the Central Vikings in the NPC second division and for the Hurricanes in the Super 12.

Bachop had a key role in Otago's back to back wins over the British and Irish Lions in 1993 and the Springboks in 1994.

== All Blacks statistics ==
Tests: 5 (0 as Captain)
Games: 13 (0 as Captain)
Total Matches: 18 (0 as Captain)
Test Points: 0pts
Game Points: 33pts (6t, 0c, 0p, 1dg, 0m)
Total Points: 33pts (6t, 0c, 0p, 1dg, 0m)

== Family ==
Bachop is of Samoan, Tahitian and Cook Islands Heritage.

Several of Bachop's relatives have played sport at a high level, among them brother Graeme Bachop and nephews Aaron Mauger and Nathan Mauger, all of whom have played for the All Blacks. Stephen's wife was Sue Garden-Bachop, a New Zealand representative and coach at women's rugby. Their sons, Connor Garden-Bachop and Jackson Garden-Bachop, are also professional rugby players, and their daughter Georgia Garden-Bachop has represented New Zealand at age-group level at hockey. Another uncle of Aaron and Nathan is former world speedway champion Ivan Mauger.
