= Sue Garden-Bachop =

New Zealand sportsperson

Personal information
- Born: Susan Carol Garden; 2 December 1961
- Died: 11 September 2008 (aged 46) Wellington, New Zealand
- Spouse: Stephen Bachop
- Relatives: Connor Garden-Bachop (son); Jackson Garden-Bachop (son); Graeme Bachop (brother-in-law)

Susan Carol Garden-Bachop (2 December 1961 – 11 September 2008) was a New Zealand sportsperson who represented her country in rugby union, touch, basketball and field hockey.

== Early life and family ==
Born in 1961, Garden-Bachop grew up in the Lower Hutt suburb of Wainuiomata. She married rugby union player and coach Stephen Bachop and together they had three children: Georgia, Jackson and Connor, all of whom play sport at high levels. The couple separated in 2006.

== Sporting career ==
In 1988, Garden-Bachop was promoted to co-coach of Wellington's Northern United senior men's team, becoming one of the first women to coach a premier side in the country. She was a selector for the New Zealand women's rugby team, the Black Ferns from 1996 to 1998.

She was coach of University of Leeds' 1st XV in 2000-2002 and took the Leeds Tykes Sevens team to the quarterfinals of the Middlesex Sevens in 2001. In 2002 she returned to New Zealand and was appointed assistant coach of the Black Ferns.

== Later life and death ==
Garden-Bachop was diagnosed with leukemia and wrote a children's book, Who Will Tuck Me In?, published in 2006, to help children understand their feelings when a parent is dying from cancer. She died aged 46 in Wellington on 11 September 2008.
