= Fosi Pala'amo =

- Born: 23 August 1976 (age 50) Murupara, New Zealand
- Height: 6 ft 2 in (1.88 m)
- Weight: 145 kg (320 lb)
- School: Randwick Boys Highschool
- Occupation: Rugby Player

Rugby union career
- Position: Prop
Amateur team(s)
Years	Team	Apps	(Points)
- Monkstown Rugby Club
Senior career
Years	Team	Apps	(Points)
2006–2007	Leinster	5	(0)
2010	Leeds Carnegie		
International career
Years	Team	Apps	(Points)
1998–2009	Samoa	14	(5)

Fosi Pala'amo (born 23 August 1976) is a New Zealand professional rugby player of Samoan descent. Internationally, he plays for Samoa. He was born in Murupara, New Zealand to Samoan parents. He was formerly a player for the Irish team Leinster Rugby, but now works at Pfizer for a living and coaches the forwards on the Pfizer tag rugby team. Pala'amo coaches Monkstown u20s.

== Professional profile ==
Pala'amo is a product of the famous Australian rugby club Randwick, where he was selected for the Australian Under 21 team, playing alongside Wallabies such as Tom Bowman and Stirling Mortlock. However, despite being hailed a Wallaby in the making, he switched his allegiance to Samoa, and in 1998 at the age of 21, he made his debut for Samoa in the Oceania qualifying games for the 1999 world cup. However, he withdrew from the Samoa squad for the 1999 Rugby World Cup due to a serious knee injury which threatened to end his playing career. Pala'amo did not play international rugby again for eight years. He was eventually recalled to the squad for the 2007 World Cup, despite not participating in the warm up games. He was thrown in at the deep end against the defending champions and eventual runners-up, England. In total, Pala'amo has nine international caps for Samoa. He now works for Pfizer Ireland and lives in Dublin. He is the son of a Samoan church minister who has retired in Australia.
