= Maryland Exiles =

US rugby union club, based in Bethesda, Maryland

(United States) Maryland Exiles
- Full name: Maryland Exiles Rugby Club
- Union: USA Rugby
- Founded: 1993
- Disbanded: 2014 (merger into the Potomac Exiles)
- Location: Bethesda, Maryland, US

Official website
- www.potomacexilesrugbyclub.com?page_id=148

The Maryland Exiles were an American rugby union team in Bethesda, Maryland which competed as a member of Division I under the USA Rugby governing body. The team fielded both a standard 15-man squad and seven-a-side squad. The team competed abroad in England, Sri Lanka, and the Cayman Islands. The Maryland Exiles have been featured in The Washington Post, The Virginian-Pilot, International Rugby News, and on the cover of Rugby Magazine.

The Exiles were formed in 1993 by the amalgamation of three local area clubs: the Maryland Old Boys, Montgomery County Rugby Club, and the Old Red Rugby Club. The fifteens squad placed third in the Aspen Ruggerfest, the United States' premier fifteen-man tournament, in 1996. In 1996, 1997, and 2007, the Exiles advanced to the Sweet Sixteen round of the National Club Championship. In United States' National Club Sevens Championship, the Exiles have placed second (1994 and 2002) and third (2003, 2005, and 2006). The Maryland Old Boys, from which the Exiles were partially formed, won the National Club Sevens in 1989, placed third in 1991 and 1992, and placed third in 1988 and 1990.

In the fall of 2014, the Maryland Exiles merged with the Potomac Athletic Club, forming the Potomac Exiles.

== Notable players ==
- John Krause, Eagles
- Inaki Basauri, Eagles 2007
- Will Brewington, Eagles Sevens 1987–1993
- Joe Fradella, Eagles Sevens 2004
- Brian Gallagher, Eagles Sevens 1997
- Eddie Galpin, Eagles Sevens 2001
- James Gillenwater, Eagles Sevens 2007, All-American at Vanderbilt
- Kevin Gittings, Eagles Sevens 1998
- Vince Granger, Eagles Sevens 1989
- Bill Hayward, Eagles 1991
- Steve Laake, All-American at Loyola College
- Owen Lentz, Eagles 2006–2007
- Justin Lucas, All-American at Cal Poly
- Mark Miller, Eagles Sevens 1994
- Chris Petrakes, Eagles Sevens 1988-1991
- Dave Ries, Eagles Sevens 1998
- Tom Sanders, Eagles Sevens 2004, All-American at Virginia
- Jeff Soeken, All-American at Maryland
- Don Younger, Eagles Sevens 1997–2002, All-American at Indiana
- Dylan Ritzer, All-American 2013, All State Salisbury University
