= Donald Kerslake =

Samoan rugby union player

Loau Donald Kerslake
- Born: 6 August 1980 (age 46) Samoa
- Height: 174 cm (5 ft 9 in)
- Weight: 118 kg (260 lb; 18 st 8 lb)

Rugby union career
- Position: Prop
International career
Years	Team	Apps	(Points)
2005–2007	Samoa	9	(0)
- Correct as of 5 May 2021

Loau Donald Kerslake (born 6 August 1980) is a Samoan judge and former rugby union player. He is the son of former Samoan Cabinet Minister and President of the lands and Titles Court Tuala Tagaloa Sale Kerslake.

== Sporting career ==
Kerslake's playing position was prop. He was selected to represent Samoa at the 2007 Rugby World Cup, however he withdrew with injury before the tournament began. He made 9 appearances for Samoa over the course of his career.

== Legal and judicial career ==
Kerslake trained as a lawyer, and was admitted to the Samoan bar in 2002. He worked as a lawyer for the Office of the Attorney General, then in private practice. In January 2020 he was appointed a district court judge. He later served as Principal Youth Court Judge for the Youth Court of Samoa.

In July 2025 he was appointed an acting justice of the Supreme Court of Samoa.
