= Ualosi Kailea =

Tongan rugby union player

- Born: October 28, 1978 (age 48)
- Height: 1.81 m (5 ft 11 1/2 in)
- Weight: 97 kg (214 lb; 15.3 st)

Rugby union career
- Position: Wing
International career
Years	Team	Apps	(Points)
2007	Tonga		

Ualosi Kailea (born 28 October 1978, in Ha'ateiho) is a Tongan rugby union Wing. He was a member of the Tonga national rugby union team and participated with the squad at the 2007 Rugby World Cup.
