= Jackson Garden-Bachop =

New Zealand rugby union player

- Full name: Jackson Kyle Garden-Bachop
- Born: 3 October 1994 (age 32) Dunedin, New Zealand
- Height: 183 cm (6 ft 0 in)
- Weight: 99 kg (218 lb; 15 st 8 lb)
- School: Scots College
- Notable relative(s): Graeme Bachop (uncle); Stephen Bachop (father); Connor Garden-Bachop (brother); Sue Garden-Bachop (mother); Aaron Mauger (cousin); Nathan Mauger (cousin); Ivan Mauger (great uncle)

Rugby union career
- Position(s): First five-eighth, Fullback
- Current team: Wellington
Senior career
Years	Team	Apps	(Points)
2013–	Wellington	100	(694)
2017	Rebels	13	(16)
2018–2023	Hurricanes	31	(61)
2022–2023	Kintetsu Liners	17	(103)
2023–2024	CA Brive	9	(66)
2025–2026	Moana Pasifika	1	(0)
- Correct as of 27 September 2023
International career
Years	Team	Apps	(Points)
2014	New Zealand U20	2	(10)
2017	Māori All Blacks	2	(10)
- Correct as of 5 June 2022

Jackson Kyle Garden-Bachop (born 3 October 1994) is a New Zealand rugby union player who plays as a fly-half for the CA Brive in the Top 14 in France.

== Early career ==
Born in Dunedin, Garden-Bachop is of Māori, Samoan, French Polynesian and Cook islander ancestry and was raised in Wellington, Garden-Bachop played rugby at Scots College in the city. He is the son of former All Black Stephen Bachop and former Black Fern Sue Garden-Bachop.

== Senior career ==
Garden-Bachop debuted for the Wellington Lions as a teenager during the 2013 ITM Cup making a solitary appearance. Over the course of the next 3 seasons, he gradually became a more frequent starter and by the 2016 season he could call himself Wellington's starting number 10.

== Super Rugby ==
Unable to land a contract with one of New Zealand's five Super Rugby franchises, Garden-Bachop joined Australian side, the Melbourne Rebels. He signed a 2-year contract prior to the 2017 Super Rugby season.

Garden-Bachop has signed a two-year contract with the Wellington Hurricanes to begin in 2018.

== Top 14 ==
In 2023, he landed a contract with the CA Brive in the French Top 14 for two years.

== International ==
Garden Bachop represented New Zealand at schoolboy level in 2012 and under-20 level in 2014. In 2017 Garden-Bachop was named in the Māori All Blacks squad for their tour of France and Canada he played in all games.

== Super Rugby Statistics ==
As of 6 November 2017

Season	Team	Games	Starts	Sub	Mins	Tries	Cons	Pens	Drops	Points	Yel	Red
2017	Rebels	13	9	4	764	1	1	3	0	16	0	0
Total		13	9	4	764	1	1	3	0	16	0	0
