= 2009 IRB Pacific Nations Cup =

Tournament details
- Countries: Fiji; Japan; Junior All Blacks; Samoa; Tonga
- Tournament format(s): Round-robin
- Date: 12 June – 3 July 2009

Tournament statistics
- Teams: 5
- Matches played: 10
- Attendance: 0 (0 per match)
- Tries scored: 72 (7.2 per match)
- Top point scorer(s): Hosea Gear (Junior All Blacks) (40 points)
- Top try scorer(s): Hosea Gear (Junior All Blacks) (8 tries)

Final
- Champions: Junior All Blacks (3rd title)
- Runners-up: Fiji

The 2009 Pacific Nations Cup is a rugby union tournament held between five national sides on the Pacific Rim: Fiji, Japan, Samoa, Tonga and the Junior All Blacks. The New Zealand Māori team that won the tournament last year will no longer take part in this competition because of a decision taken by the New Zealand Rugby Union. Australia A has also decided to pull out due to a similar decision. The inaugural competition was held in 2006. This year the tournament will begin on June 12 and ends on July 3, 2009 and most of the matches will be hosted by Fiji. The awarding of the key international tournament to the Fiji Rugby Union represents a further boost to the continued development of rugby in the region. The two opening round matches will be played outside of Fiji with Samoa hosting the Junior All Blacks in Apia and Tonga entertaining the Fijians in Nukuʻalofa the following day before the tournament moves to Fiji for a 17-day festival of international rugby spread across three match venues: the ANZ National Stadium (Suva), Churchill Park (Lautoka) and Lawaqa Park (Sigatoka).

The tournament is a round-robin where each team plays all of the other teams once. There are four points for a win, two for a draw and none for a defeat. There are also bonus points offered with one bonus point for scoring four or more tries in a match and one bonus point for losing by 7 points or less.

== Table ==
2009 IRB Pacific Nations Cup
	Team	Played	Won	Drawn	Lost	Points For	Points Against	Points Difference	Tries For	Tries Against	Try Bonus	Losing Bonus	Points
1	Junior All Blacks	4	4	0	0	161	79	+82	24	11	3	0	19
2	Fiji	4	3	0	1	112	120	-8	13	16	2	0	14
3	Samoa	4	2	0	2	91	64	27	13	6	2	2	12
4	Japan	4	1	0	3	96	145	-49	12	21	1	1	6
5	Tonga	4	0	0	4	79	131	-52	10	18	0	1	1
Source : irb.com Points breakdown: *4 points for a win *2 points for a draw *1 bonus point for a loss by seven points or less *1 bonus point for scoring four or more tries in a match

== Schedule ==
=== Round 1 ===
12 June 2009
16:00 (UTC-11)

Samoa	16 – 17	Junior All Blacks
Try: G. Williams 62' m Lauina 67' m Con: G. Williams (0/2); Pen: G. Williams (2/2) 43', 46'	Report	Try: H. Gear 23' c Dagg 27' c Con: Slade (2/2) 25', 28'; Pen: Slade (1/1) 10'

Apia Park, Apia
Referee: Dave Pearson (England)

FB	15	Lolo Lui
RW	14	Sailosi Tagicakibau
OC	13	Gavin Williams
IC	12	Eliota Fuimaono-Sapolu
LW	11	Alesana Tuilagi	(substituted off) 36'
FH	10	Ki Anufe	(substituted off) 58'
SH	9	Junior Poluleuligaga
N8	8	George Stowers (c)
OF	7	Ofisa Treviranus	(substituted off) 75'
BF	6	Jonny Fa'amatuainu
RL	5	Joe Tekori
LL	4	Filipo Levi
TP	3	Census Johnston	(substituted off) 58'
HK	2	Mahonri Schwalger	(substituted off) 58'
LP	1	Fosi Palaamo
Replacements:
HK	16	Andrew Williams	(substituted in) 58'
PR	17	Justin Va'a	(substituted in) 58'
N8	18	Daniel Leo
FL	19	William Brame	(substituted in) 75'
SH	20	Henry Fa'afili
FH	21	Uale Mai	(substituted in) 58'
CR	22	Esera Lauina	(substituted in) 36'
Coach:
(Samoa) Titimaea Tafua

FB	15	Israel Dagg	(substituted off) 74'
RW	14	Rene Ranger	(substituted off) 69'
OC	13	Anthony Tuitavake
IC	12	Tamati Ellison (c)
LW	11	Hosea Gear
FH	10	Colin Slade
SH	9	Chris Smylie	(substituted off) 64'
N8	8	Victor Vito
OF	7	George Whitelock	(substituted off) 59'
BF	6	Jason Eaton
RL	5	Tom Donnelly	(substituted off) 56'
LL	4	Jeremy Thrush
TP	3	Ben Franks
HK	2	Aled de Malmanche	(substituted off) 52'
LP	1	Jacob Ellison
Replacements:
HK	16	John Schwalger	(substituted in) 52'
PR	17	Hika Elliot
LK	18	Craig Clarke	(substituted in) 56'
FL	19	Alando Soakai	(substituted in) 59'
SH	20	Sean Romans	(substituted in) 64'
CR	21	Stephen Brett	(substituted in) 74'
CR	22	Ryan Crotty	(substituted in) 69'
Coach:
(New Zealand) Colin Cooper (New Zealand) Ian Foster

Touch judges:
(Samoa) Tui Komiti
(Samoa) Peter Ah Kuio

13 June 2009
12:00 (UTC+13)

Tonga	22 – 36	Fiji
Try: Fatafehi 1' c Toke 43' m Lilo 53' c Con: Halaifonua (2/3) 4', 58'; Pen: Halaifonua (1/1) 31'	Report	Try: Nagusa (2) 20' m, 40 c Seuseu 37' c Koto 54' c Noilea 80+1' c Con: T. Rawaqa (4/5) 38', 40+1', 54', 80+1'; Pen: T. Rawaqa (1/1) 73'

Teufaiva Sport Stadium, Nukuʻalofa
Referee: Nathan Pearce (Australia)

FB	15	Vunga Lilo
RW	14	Alipate Fatafehi	(substituted off) 55'
OC	13	Hudson Tongaʻuiha
IC	12	Epi Taione	(substituted off) 73'
LW	11	Tevita Halaifonua
FH	10	Fangatapu Apikotoa
SH	9	Sililo Martens
N8	8	Chris Hala'ufia	(substituted off) 73'
OF	7	Nili Langilangi (c)
BF	6	Hale T Tu'uhoko
RL	5	Sione Timani	34' to 35' (substituted off) 55'
LL	4	Joshua Afu
TP	3	Po'alo'i Taula	(substituted off) 66'
HK	2	Ilaisa Maʻasi	(substituted off) 66'
LP	1	Toma Toke
Replacements:
HK	16	Viliami Maʻasi	(substituted in) 66'
PR	17	Makoni Finau	(substituted in) 66'
N8	18	Opeti Fonua	(substituted in) 73'
LK	19	Pasuka Mapakaitolo	(substituted in) 34' (substituted off) 35' (substituted in) 55'
SH	20	Mahe Fangupo
CR	21	Kaiongo Tupou	(substituted in) 73'
WG	22	Joseph Vaka	(substituted in) 55'
Coach:
(Tonga) Quddus Fielea

FB	15	Taniela Rawaqa
RW	14	Filimoni Bolavucu
OC	13	Waisale Sukanaveita
IC	12	Seru Rabeni
LW	11	Timoci Nagusa
FH	10	Alipate Noilea
SH	9	Jone Daunivucu	(substituted off) 64'
N8	8	Netani Talei
OF	7	Samu Bola	(substituted off) 72'
BF	6	Semisi Saukawa
RL	5	Kele Leawere (c)	60' to 70'
LL	4	Josefa Domolailai
TP	3	Viliame Seuseu
HK	2	Sunia Koto	(substituted off) 76'
LP	1	Graham Dewes	(yellow card) 58' to 68'
Replacements:
HK	16	Sireli Ledua	(substituted in) 60' (substituted off) 70' (substituted in) 76'
PR	17	Alefoso Yalayalatabua
LK	18	Leone Nakarawa
FL	19	Sakiusa Matadigo	(substituted in) 72'
SH	20	Nemia Kenatale	(substituted in) 64'
CR	21	Waisea Luveniyali
WG	22	Ilikena Bolakoro
Coach:
(Fiji) Ilie Tabua

Touch judges:
(Tonga) Eva Mafi
(Tonga) Tounga Vea

=== Round 2 ===
18 June 2009
15:10 (UTC+12)

Fiji	17 – 45	Junior All Blacks
Try: Kenatale 17' c Matadigo 45' m Keresoni 74'; Con: Tani (1/2) 17'; Luveniyali (0/1); Pen: Tani (0/1)	Report	Try: H. Gear (2) 7' m, 80' c Donnelly 19' m T. Ellison 25' c Tuitavake 33' c Lowe 42' c Ranger 66 c Con: Brett (4/6) 26', 34', 43', 67'; Slade (1/1) 80'

Churchill Park, Lautoka
Referee: Romain Poite (France)

FB	15	Iliesa Keresoni	(substituted off) 57'
RW	14	Filimoni Bolavucu
OC	13	Waisele Suka
IC	12	Seru Rabeni	(substituted off) 61'
LW	11	Timoci Nagusa
FH	10	Alipate Tani
SH	9	Nemia Kenatale	(substituted off) 71'
N8	8	Sakiusa Matadigo
OF	7	Netani Talei
BF	6	Leone Nakarawa	(substituted off) 53'
RL	5	Kele Leawere (c)
LL	4	Ifereimi Rawaqa	(substituted off) 62'
TP	3	Viliame Seuseu	(substituted off) 53'	(substituted in) 73'
HK	2	Sunia Koto	(substituted off) 66'
LP	1	Graham Dewes	(substituted off) 78'
Replacements:
HK	16	Sireli Ledua	(substituted in) 66'
PR	17	Alefoso Yalayalatabua	(substituted in) 53'
LK	18	Anthony Wise	(substituted in) 53'
FL	19	Josefa Domolailai	(substituted in) 62'
SH	20	Jone Daunivucu	(substituted in) 71'
FB	21	Waisea Luveniyali	(substituted in) 57'
CR	22	Vereniki Goneva	(substituted in) 61'
Coach:
(Fiji) Ilie Tabua

FB	15	Tamati Ellison (c)	(yellow card) 69' to 79'
RW	14	Rene Ranger
OC	13	Anthony Tuitavake
IC	12	Ryan Crotty
LW	11	Hosea Gear
FH	10	Stephen Brett	(substituted off) 72'
SH	9	Chris Smylie
N8	8	Victor Vito	(substituted off) 50'
OF	7	Karl Lowe	(substituted off) 50'
BF	6	Jason Eaton
RL	5	Tom Donnelly
LL	4	Jeremy Thrush
TP	3	Ben Franks
HK	2	Hika Elliot
LP	1	John Schwalger
Replacements:
HK	16	Ged Robinson
PR	17	James McGougan
N8	18	Sione Lauaki	(substituted in) 50'
LK	19	Alando Soakai	(substituted in) 50'
SH	20	Sean Romans
CR	21	Colin Slade	(substituted in) 72'
WG	22	Robert Fruean
Coach:
(New Zealand) Colin Cooper (New Zealand) Ian Foster

Touch judges:
(Samoa) Tui Komiti
(Tonga) Eva Mafi

18 June 2009
13:10 (UTC+12)

Japan	15 – 34	Samoa
Try: Tarrant 47' c Onozawa 50' m Con: Nicholas (1/2) 47'; Pen: Nicholas (1/1) 26'	Report	Try: Penalty try 24' c Va'a 36' m Tagicakibau 52' c M. Schwalger 53' m Lauina 62' m Sititi 68' m Con: G. Williams (2/5) 24', 52'; Pen: G. Williams (0/1)

Lawaqa Park, Sigatoka
Referee: Nathan Pearce (Australia)

FB	15	Jack Tarrant
RW	14	Koji Tomioka	(substituted off) 65'
OC	13	Koji Taira	(substituted off) 62'
IC	12	Ryan Nicholas
LW	11	Hirotoki Onozawa
FH	10	Shaun Webb	(substituted off) 68'
SH	9	Fumiaki Tanaka
N8	8	Takashi Kikutani (c)
OF	7	Touetsu Taufa
BF	6	Michael Leitch	(substituted off) 62'
RL	5	Toshizumi Kitagawa	(substituted off) 67'
LL	4	Luke Thompson
TP	3	Hiroshi Yamashita	(substituted off) 52'
HK	2	Yusuke Aoki
LP	1	Hisateru Hirashima
Replacements:
HK	16	Tateo Kanai
PR	17	Kensuke Hatakeyama	(substituted in) 52'
LK	18	Hitoshi Ono	(substituted in) 67'
FL	19	Masakazu Toyota	(substituted in) 62'
SH	20	Tomoki Yoshida	(substituted in) 68'
WG	21	James Arlidge	(substituted in) 65'
CR	22	Yuta Imamura	(substituted in) 62'
Coach:
(New Zealand) John Kirwan

FB	15	Lolo Lui
RW	14	Henry Fa'afili
OC	13	Gavin Williams
IC	12	Eliota Fuimaono-Sapolu
LW	11	Sailosi Tagicakibau	(substituted off) 59'
FH	10	Uale Mai	(substituted off) 54'
SH	9	Notise Tauafao	(substituted off) 46'
N8	8	George Stowers (c)
OF	7	William Brame	(substituted off) 46'
BF	6	Jonny Fa'amatuainu	(substituted off) 57' (substituted in) 63' (substituted off) 65'
RL	5	Filipo Levi
LL	4	Daniel Leo	63' to 65'
TP	3	Census Johnston
HK	2	Mahonri Schwalger	(substituted off) 63'
LP	1	Justin Va'a	(substituted off) 62'
Replacements:
HK	16	Andrew Williams	(substituted in) 63'
PR	17	Ernest Skelton	(substituted in) 62'
N8	18	Semo Sititi	(substituted in) 57'
FL	19	Ofisa Treviranus	(substituted in) 46'
SH	20	Junior Poluleuligaga	(substituted in) 46'
WG	21	Rupeni Levasa	(substituted in) 59'
FH	22	Esera Lauina	(substituted in) 54'
Coach:
(Samoa) Titimaea Tafua

Touch judges:
(Fiji) Napolioni Locoloco
(Fiji) Samuela Tuidraki

=== Round 3 ===
23 June 2009
12:10 (UTC+12)

Samoa	27 – 13	Tonga
Try: G. Williams 6' m Stowers 39' m Tagicakibau 41' c Poluleuligaga 55' c Con: Anufe (2/4) 42', 56'; Pen: G. Williams (1/1) 73'	Report	Try: Kaufusi 62' c Con: Hola (1/1) 63'; Pen: Hola (2/4) 1', 37'

Churchill Park, Lautoka
Referee: Romain Poite (France)

FB	15	Lolo Lui
RW	14	Henry Fa'afili	(substituted off) 68'
OC	13	Gavin Williams
IC	12	Seilala Mapusua
LW	11	Sailosi Tagicakibau
FH	10	Ki Anufe
SH	9	Junior Polu
N8	8	George Stowers (c)
OF	7	Ofisa Treviranus
BF	6	Misioka Timoteo	(substituted off) 61'
RL	5	Joe Tekori
LL	4	Filipo Levi
TP	3	Census Johnston
HK	2	Mahonri Schwalger
LP	1	Justin Va'a	(substituted off) 80+2'
Replacements:
HK	16	Andrew Williams
PR	17	Ernest Skelton	(substituted in) 80+2'
LK	18	Jonny Fa'amatuainu	(substituted in) 61'
FL	19	Semo Sititi
SH	20	Uale Mai
WG	21	Rupeni Levasa
CR	22	Esera Lauina	(substituted in) 68'
Coach:
(Samoa) Titimaea Tafua

FB	15	Vunga Lilo
RW	14	Mateo Malupo
OC	13	Hudson Tongaʻuiha
IC	12	Kaiongo Tupou	(substituted off) 31'
LW	11	Joseph Vaka
FH	10	Pierre Hola
SH	9	Sililo Martens	(substituted off) 69'
N8	8	Opeti Fonua	(substituted off) 57'
OF	7	Nili Latu (c)
BF	6	Hale T-Pole
RL	5	Emosi Kauhenga	(substituted off) 70'
LL	4	Joshua Afu
TP	3	Kisi Pulu
HK	2	Viliami Maʻasi	(substituted off) 51'
LP	1	Peni Fakalelu
Replacements:
HK	16	Ilaisa Maʻasi	(substituted in) 51'
PR	17	Toma Toke
LK	18	Samiu Ika	(substituted in) 70'
N8	19	Muli Kaufusi	(substituted in) 57'
SH	20	Mahe Fangupo	(substituted in) 69'
WG	21	Fangatapu Apikotoa
CR	22	Alipate Fatafehi	(substituted in) 31'
Coach:
(Tonga) Quddus Fielea

Touch judges:
(Fiji) Napolioni Locoloco
(Fiji) Samuela Tuidraki

23 June 2009
15:10 (UTC+12)

Japan	21 – 52	Junior All Blacks
Try: H. Ono 5' c Tarrant 17' c Taira 23' c Con: Nicholas (3/3) 6', 18', 24'	Report	Try: Vito (2) 11' c, 33' c Slade 16' m H. Gear (2) 21' c, 80+4' c Clarke 23' c Lauakai (2) 36' c, 62' m Con: Slade (5/6) 12', 22', 24', 34', 37'; Brett (1/2) 80+5'; Pen: Slade (0/1)

Churchill Park, Lautoka
Referee: Jonathan Kaplan (South Africa)

FB	15	Ayumu Goromaru
RW	14	Jack Tarrant
OC	13	Koji Taira
IC	12	Ryan Nicholas	(substituted off) 71'
LW	11	Koji Tomioka	(substituted off) 23'
FH	10	James Arlidge
SH	9	Tomoki Yoshida	(substituted off) 73'
N8	8	Takashi Kikutani (c)
OF	7	Touetsu Taufa
BF	6	Michael Leitch
RL	5	Toshizumi Kitagawa	(substituted off) 70'
LL	4	Hitoshi Ono
TP	3	Kensuke Hatakeyama	(substituted off) 74'
HK	2	Yusuke Aoki	(substituted off) 55'
LP	1	Hisateru Hirashima
Replacements:
HK	16	Tateo Kanai	(substituted in) 55'
PR	17	Hiroshi Yamashita	(substituted in) 74'
LK	18	Yuji Kitagawa	(substituted in) 70'
FL	19	Masakazu Toyota
SH	20	Yuki Yatomi	(substituted in) 73'
WG	21	Tatsuhiko Otao	(substituted in) 71'
CR	22	Yuta Imamura	(substituted in) 23'
Coach:
(New Zealand) John Kirwan

FB	15	Israel Dagg
RW	14	Robert Fruean	(substituted off) 66'
OC	13	Tamati Ellison (c)
IC	12	Hosea Gear
LW	11	Callum Bruce
FH	10	Colin Slade	(substituted off) 62'
SH	9	Sean Romans	(substituted off) 55'
N8	8	Sione Lauaki
OF	7	Alando Soakai	(substituted off) 54'
BF	6	Victor Vito
RL	5	Tom Donnelly	(substituted off) 62'
LL	4	Craig Clarke
TP	3	John Schwalger	(yellow card) 53' to 63'
HK	2	Hika Elliot	Substituted off
LP	1	Jacob Ellison	(substituted off) 60'
Replacements:
HK	16	Ben Franks
PR	17	Jamie Mackintosh	(substituted in) 60'
LK	18	Jason Eaton	(substituted in) 62'
FL	19	Karl Lowe	(substituted in) 54'
SH	20	Alby Mathewson	(substituted in) 55'
FH	21	Stephen Brett	(substituted in) 62'
WG	22	Anthony Tuitavake	(substituted in) 66'
Coach:
(New Zealand) Colin Cooper (New Zealand) Ian Foster

Touch judges:
(Samoa) Tui Komiti
(Tonga) Eva Mafi

=== Round 4 ===
27 June 2009
12:10 (UTC+12)

Tonga	19 – 21	Japan
Try: Vaka; I. Maʻasi; Halaifonua; Con: Hola (2/3)	Report	Try: Webb (2) 22', 32'; Con: Nicholas (1/2); Pen: Nicholas (1/1); Arlidge (2/2)

Churchill Park, Lautoka
Referee: Romain Poite (France)

FB	15	Vunga Lilo
RW	14	Tevita Halaifonua
OC	13	Hudson Tongaʻuiha
IC	12	Joseph Vaka
LW	11	Mateo Malupo
FH	10	Pierre Hola
SH	9	Mahe Fangupo
N8	8	Pasuka Mapakaitolo
OF	7	Nili Latu (c)
BF	6	Hale T-Pole
RL	5	Samiuela Ika
LL	4	Josh Afu	Temporarily suspended
TP	3	Kisi Pulu
HK	2	Ilaisa Maʻasi	Substituted off
LP	1	Toma Toke
Replacements:
HK	16	Viliame Maʻasi	Substituted in
PR	17	Makoni Finau	Substituted in
LK	18	Emosi Kauhenga	Substituted in
LK	19	Teu'imuli Kaufusi	Substituted in
SH	20	Siosaia Palei	Substituted in
FH	21	Fangatapu Apikotoa	Substituted in
FL	22	Fou-Ki-Moana Katoa	Substituted in
Coach:
(Tonga) Quddus Fielea

FB	15	Shaun Webb
RW	14	Jack Tarrant
OC	13	Yuta Imamura
IC	12	Ryan Nicholas
LW	11	Hirotoki Onozawa
FH	10	James Arlidge
SH	9	Fumiaki Tanaka
N8	8	Takashi Kikutani (c)
OF	7	Toetuu Taufa
BF	6	Masakazu Toyota
RL	5	Toshizumi Kitagawa
LL	4	Luke Thompson
TP	3	Kensuke Hatakeyama
HK	2	Yusuke Aoki
LP	1	Hisateru Hirashima
Replacements:
HK	16	Tateo Kanai
PR	17	Hiroshi Yamashita	Substituted in
LK	18	Hitoshi Ono	Substituted in
FL	19	Yoshitaka Nakayama	Substituted in
SH	20	Tomoki Yoshida
FB	21	Tatsuhiko Otao	Substituted in
CR	22	Koji Taira	Substituted in
Coach:
(New Zealand) John Kirwan

Touch judges:
TBC
TBC

27 June 2009
15:10 (UTC+12)

Samoa	14 – 19	Fiji
Try: Tauafao m Con: G. Williams (0/1); Pen: G. Williams (3/3)	Report	Try: Goneva c Con: Bai (1/1); Pen: Bai (4/4)

Churchill Park, Lautoka
Referee: Jonathan Kaplan (South Africa)

FB	15	Lolo Lui
RW	14	Henry Fa'afili
OC	13	Gavin Williams
IC	12	Seilala Mapusua
LW	11	Sailosi Tagicakibau
FH	10	Eliota Fuimaono-Sapolu
SH	9	Junior Poluleuligaga
N8	8	George Stowers (c)
OF	7	William Brame
BF	6	Daniel Leo
RL	5	Filipo Levi
LL	4	Joe Tekori
TP	3	Census Johnston
HK	2	Mahonri Schwalger	Substituted off
LP	1	Fosi Pala'amo
Replacements:
HK	16	Andrew Williams	Substituted in
PR	17	Justin Va'a	Substituted in
FL	18	Jonny Fa'amatuainu	Substituted in
LK	19	Ofisa Treviranus	Substituted in
SH	20	Notise Tauafao	Substituted in
CR	21	Uale Mai	Substituted in
WG	22	Esera Lauina	Substituted in
Coach:
(Samoa) Titimaea Tafua

FB	15	Taniela Maravunwasawasa
RW	14	Ropate Ratu
OC	13	Ilikena Bolakoro
IC	12	Seremaia Bai
LW	11	Iliesa Keresoni
FH	10	Waisea Luveniyali
SH	9	Jone Daunivucu
N8	8	Netani Talei
OF	7	Samu Bola
BF	6	Semisi Saukawa	Temporarily suspended
RL	5	Kele Leawere (c)
LL	4	Josefa Domolailai
TP	3	Viliame Seuseu
HK	2	Sunia Vuli	Substituted off
LP	1	Graham Dewes
Replacements:
HK	16	Sireli Ledua	Substituted in
PR	17	Alefoso Yalayalatabua	Substituted in
LK	18	Leone Nakarawa
FL	19	Anthony Wise
SH	20	Nemia Kenatale	Substituted in
FB	21	Ravai Fatiaki
CR	22	Vereniki Goneva	Substituted in
Coach:
(Fiji) Ilie Tabua

Touch judges:
(Fiji) James Bolabiu
(Tonga) Eva Mafi

=== Round 5 ===
2 July 2009
15:10 (UTC+12)

Tonga	25 – 47	Junior All Blacks
Try: Kauhenga; Kaufusi; Malupo; Con: Hola (2); Pen: Hola (2)	Report	Try: H. Gear (3); Ranger; Lauaki; Mathewson; Fruean; Con: Brett (3); Slade (3)

National Stadium, Suva
Referee: Dave Pearson (England)

3 July 2009
15:10 (UTC+12)

Fiji	40 – 39	Japan
Try: Kenatale; Goneva; Ledua; Talei; Con: Bai (4); Pen: Bai (4)	Report	Try: Kikutani (2); Toetu'u; Tarrant; Aoki; Con: Nicholas (4); Pen: Nicholas (2)

National Stadium, Suva
Referee: Jonathan Kaplan (South Africa)

== Top scorers ==
=== Top points scorers ===
Rank	Player	Team	Points
1	Hosea Gear	Junior All Blacks	40
2	Ryan Nicholas	Japan	36
3	Seremaia Bai	Fiji	34
4	Gavin Williams	Samoa	32
5	Colin Slade	Junior All Blacks	30
6	Pierre Hola	Tonga	22
7	Stephen Brett	Junior All Blacks	16
8	Sione Lauaki	Junior All Blacks	15
8	Jack Tarrant	Japan	15
10	Tevita Halaifonua	Tonga	12
11	Taniela Rawaqa	Fiji	11

Source: irb.com

=== Top try scorers ===
Rank	Player	Team	Tries
1	Hosea Gear	Junior All Blacks	8
2	Sione Lauaki	Junior All Blacks	3
2	Jack Tarrant	Japan	3
4	Vereniki Goneva	Fiji	2
4	Muli Kaufusi	Tonga	2
4	Nemia Kenatale	Fiji	2
4	Takashi Kikutani	Japan	2
4	Esera Lauina	Samoa	2
4	Timoci Nagusa	Fiji	2
4	Rene Ranger	Junior All Blacks	2
4	Sailosi Tagicakibau	Samoa	2
4	Victor Vito	Junior All Blacks	2
4	Shaun Webb	Japan	2
4	Gavin Williams	Samoa	2
15	35 players, + 1 Penalty Try		1

Source: irb.com

== See also ==
- 2009 IRB Nations Cup
