= Deans Trophy =

Fiji Rugby Union sport award

- Current season, competition or edition: 2026 Season
- Sport: Rugby Union
- First season: 1939
- President: Mr Jone Kanalagi
- Organising body: Fiji Secondary Schools Rugby Union – FSSRU
- Divisions: North, South, West, East
- Most recent champion: Suva Grammar School (2026)
- Most titles: Queen Victoria School (31 titles : 25 wins 6 draws)
- Sponsor: Vodafone
- Related competitions: Weetbix Raluve Competition

The Deans Trophy is the most prestigious and oldest sports award among Fiji Secondary Schools sporting competitions. The boys rugby union annual competition was first introduced in 1939 and is the oldest tournament in the Fiji Rugby Union (FRU).

The original Deans Trophy is named after Mr S. S. Dean, the Manager of the Māori All Blacks team that toured Fiji in 1938 who donated the silver-coloured metal rugby ball as the prestigious prize for senior teams in the boys secondary schools rugby competition. It is now kept at the Fiji Museum in Suva.

The trophy was first won by Queen Victoria School (QVS) at the first Deans Trophy competition in 1939. QVS has gone on to win the prestigious U19 or U18 title a record 25 times.

The Deans Trophy features 6 age grades:

1. Under 14
2. Under 15
3. Under 16
4. Under 17
5. Under 18
6. Under 19

For sponsorship reasons it is currently known as Vodafone Deans Trophy.

In 2022, the Fiji Rugby Union introduced the Raluve Secondary Schools Competition designed for secondary school girls in Fiji. The term “Raluve” symbolizes the grassroots of women's rugby and represents continuous development and growth of women rugby players. The competition sponsored by Weetbix features girls from secondary schools in the Under-16 (U16) and Under-18 (U18) age categories.

== History ==
In 2000 the Deans Trophy was renamed the Post Fiji Cup after the new sponsors Post Fiji and after a tumultuous season due to political upheavals, Lelean Memorial School (LMS) of Nausori lifted the inaugural Post Fiji Cup in the U-19 grade beating Queen Victoria School in the final. Lelean had future Flying Fijians captain Akapusi Qera in their ranks whilst QVS had future Flying Fijians flanker Malakai Ravulo.

In 2001 Suva Grammar School (SGS) hoisted the Post Fiji Cup but affectionately known as the Deans trophy for the first time beating RKS 34–10 at Lawaka Park, Sigatoka. Grammar had the services of future national reps Anthony Wise, Wame Lewaravu, Manoa Vosawai, Sakiusa Matadigo.

In 2002 Ratu Kadavulevu School (RKS), with Romuluse Ratukana, Kaitu Erasito, and Kitione Oscar avenged their 2001 loss by defeating surprise finalist from Suva, Ratu Sukuna Memorial School (RSMS), who had the midfield pairing of future dual code international Waisale Sukanaveita and future musician Apimeleki Tuni as well as future NZ 7s and Junior All Blacks rep Viliame Waqaseduadua on the wing.

In 2003 QVS reclaimed the title after coming back in the dying stages of the game to beat the RKS Dream Team which was undefeated since the Under 14 grade. The RKS team had future Flying Fijians hooker Talemaitoga Tuapati in the front row and nippy scrumhalf Nemia Kenatale in their ranks, at the National Stadium.

In 2004 Lelean drew with QVS who had future flying Fijians flyhalf Waisea Luveniyali.

In 2005 RKS shared the championship with Suva Grammar School. RKS had former Melbourne Storm flyer Sisa Waqa at flyhalf while Grammar had the services of Future Flying Fijians Tevita Cavubati and Ravai Fatiaki.

Lelean won the title in 2006 thrashing Suva Grammar 27–5 in the final at the National Stadium. Lelean were led by future Flying Fijian fullback Iliesa Keresoni and their backline had too much class with the services of future Suva and Navy rep Kaminieli Neqisa and 7s reps Sakenasa Aca, Peni Rokodiva, Tomasi Mawi, Leone Ratulevu, Isikeli Vuruna and John Stewart.

QVS won the title in 2007 led by future Fiji 7s rep Waqabaca Kotobalavu, Flying Fijian fullback Kini Murimurivalu and Naitasiri halfback Koli Vunaki when they beat arch- rivals RKS 7–5 at the National Stadium. RKS had future Flying Fijian in Nemani Nagusa at No. 8 and Aporosa Kenatale at halfback.

In 2008, the Coca-Cola (Amatil) Company became the official sponsors of Fiji Secondary Schools' Rugby and donated a fiberglass replica of the original Deans Trophy.

Lelean won the title in 2008 beating a valiant RKS team 20–8 in the final at the National Stadium in Suva. This began a 3-year winning streak in the U19 Deans competition. Lelean was led by two massive props Waisea Nailago and Manasa Saulo in the frontrow whilst RKS had nippy halfback Henry Seniloli marshalling the Lododni brigade.

Lelean won the Deans Trophy in 2009 beating Nasinu Secondary School 30–8 in a brutal match at the National Stadium, Suva. In the Semi final they beat Ratu Navula College. In the quarter final Lelean overcame a tough Marist Brothers High School. In the final Nasinu had a fast backline with future Wallabies winger Marika Koroibete and French centre Virimi Vakatawa but Lelean's halves pairing of Ratu Seci Nawalowalo and Serupepeli Vularika guiding Leleans massive forward pack gave them the dominance.

LMS - DEANS FINAL 2009 VS NASINU

1. Semesa Turagabeci (Lomaiviti)
2. Jerry Tokamalua (Tailevu/Kalabu)
3. Teteki Tieke (Rabi)
4. Edward Ragamate (Lau)
5. Tevita Tuinavitilevu (Ra)
6. Josaia Visei (Viseisei Vuda)
7. Sakiusa Nadruku (Nadroga)
8. Timoci Sauvoli (Kadavu)
9. Seci Nawalowalo (Kadavu)
10. Mesake Druma (Kadavu)
11. Sosiceni Naduva (Cakaudrove/Macuata)
12. Seva Ducivaki (CBM)
13. Epeli Naituivau (Nadroga)
14. Jo Ravouvou (Nadroga)
15. Metui Talebula (Lau)
16. Solomoni Yadrekana
17. Jone Lesi
18. Sakiusa Waqavou
19. Keponi Paul
20. Sekove Serukalou
21. Saimoni Tagitagivalu
22. Serupepeli Vularika
23. Joeli Nabuka
24. Sireli Tupa
25. Aisea Natoga

Lelean won the title a third time in 2010 beating 36–18 at Churchill Park, Lautoka. Lelean had a sparkling backline with future Flying Fijian Metuisela Talebula, and two future All Blacks in Joe Ravouvou and Seta Tamanivalu whilst RKS had the service of current Flying Fijians loose forward Viliame Mata and Naitasiri flyhalf Etonia Rokotuisawa. LMS rugby academy was starting to reap its benefits and other schools was starting to notice.

In 2011 the decision was made to lower the Deans Trophy Competition from Under 19 to Under 18. Hopes for the RKS U14 2006 dream team was shattered by this executive decision, after winning all their finals including the 2011 U19 but did not get to take the Title Trophy.

in 2011 QVS beat Nadi based Western giants Ratu Navula College 19–13 at the National Stadium in the first Deans final to be played in the U18 grade. QVS had future Flying Fijians prop Mesake Doge in the front row and Emori Waqa at flyhalf and Fiji Bati and Kaiviti Silktails player Mosese Qionimacawa at wing.

Again in 2012 QVS, won the title now reverting to being called Deans Trophy with Coca-Cola Amatil as the new sponsor beating Nasinu Secondary School 31- 21. Nasinu was led by Vincent Fisher and had Fiji schoolboys stars Apolosi Ranawai, Timoci Bure and Kaveni Dabenaise whilst QVS had future Fiji Warriors and Naitasiri flyhalf Kini Douglas and future Melbourne Storm forward and Fiji Bati enforcer Tui Kamikamica.

QVS again reached final in 2013 led by future Flying Fijians and Fijian Drua rake Mesu Dolokoto as well as future All Blacks and Crusaders star winger Sevu Reece but they were pipped 19–16 by a determined Ratu Navula side to avenge their 2011 loss. Ratu Navula tries were scored by Nadroga and Drua loose forward Vasikali Mudu.

Lelean led by future Flying Fijians prop Eroni Mawi claimed the Deans trophy in 2014 beating RKS 13–8 in the final at Churchill Park, Lautoka.

In 2015 RKS led by Ratu Pio Meya with Flying Fijians Luke Tagi and Wallabies lock Seru Uru beat Marist Brothers High School (MBHS) 8–5 who had Wellinton Lions and Drua prop Kaliopasi Uluilakepa and Flying Fijians Centre Eneriko Buliruarua.

Marist again reached the final in 2016 but were denied again in sudden death 21–18 by a QVS team that had All Blacks winger Emoni Narawa and Moana Pasifika winger Timoci Tavatavanawai and Flying Fijian halfback Simione Kuruvoli. Marist had the giant fullback/wing and future Kaiviti Silktail and Flying Fijian Vuate Karawalevu.

In 2017 RKS again retained the title with a gutsy 20–5 win over arch-rivals QVS. RKS had Flying Fijians winger and Tokyo Olympic gold medalist Jiuta Wainiqolo whilst QVS had the Drua players Livai Natave and Tevita Ikanivere in their front row and another gold medalist from Tokyo Meli Derenalagi and Drua player Etonia Waqa in the backrow.

In 2018 RKS, with another Tokyo Gold medalist Sireli Maqala, and Fijian Drua props Meli Tuni, NRL player Solo Naiduki and Fiji 7s player Josese Batirerega, defeated a plucky Cuvu College side from Sigatoka who had Ilaisa Droasese at fullback and Junior Ratuva, in the final at the national stadium. RKS also won the Sanix World Rugby Youth Invitational Tournament held in Japan earlier that year beating Hastings Boys High School from NZ in the final.

In 2019 QVS avenged their loss with a hard-fought 13–12 win over RKS in the final at Lawaqa Park, Sigatoka.

The competition was cancelled during the Covid pandemic of 2020–2021 before the competition resumed in 2022 and the finals was between the two Suva schools and fierce rivals Suva Grammar and Marist Brothers, with Marist regaining the title after a lapse of 44 years winning 9–8 over the favorites Grammar in a wet and soggy Churchill Park, Lautoka. Grammar had the services of Fiji U20 and Drua halfback Philip Baselala.

The 2023 Deans Trophy Season culminated with Queen Victoria School ending Natabua High School's fairytale run coming from behind to claim a 24–15 win in the Under-18 final at the HFC Bank Stadium, Suva.

In the 2024 Vodafone Super Deans final, Queen Victoria School (QVS) defeated Nasinu Secondary School with a score of 27-13, winning the Deans Trophy for the 31st time. QVS also set a record, becoming the 2024 champions by ending Nasinu's unbeaten run.

In the 2025 Vodafone Super Deans season, RKS proved to be too strong for their opponents and ended their run with a 53-15 win over Nasinu Secondary School in the final.

For the 2026 season, Suva Grammar School, with their forwards domination, prowled through the season with extreme force, rewarding themselves with their 3rd Deans Trophy.

=== Winners ===
Queen Victoria School (QVS) has won the Deans Trophy 25 times and drawn 6 times, a record 31 times making them the most successful school in deans rugby history at the moment. It was also the first school to won the trophy when it was contested in the Under 18 age group in 2011. The Queen Victoria School Dream Team retained the Deans Trophy in 2012 undefeated from Under 14 in 2008 till Under 18 in 2012. In 2024, QVS has won the Dean's trophy for a record 25 times after they ended the unbeaten fairy tale run of Nasinu Secondary School.

Ratu Kadavulevu School (RKS) have also won the trophy 23 times and drawn 5 times. RKS first won the trophy in 1961. RKS holds the record for the longest defense of the Deans Trophy from 1980 to 1985. RKS again won the Deans Trophy in 2015. In the 2017 Competition, RKS became the first school to win all 6 trophies on offer.

Lelean Memorial School (LMS) has won the trophy 14 times and drawn five times. Lelean first won the Deans Trophy in 1944. Lelean last won the Deans Trophy in 2014. Lelean set a record in 1955 by winning all 4 trophies on offer or the Bantam Grades (weight) which were, the Donnelly Cup for the Midget Grade, Russel Shield for the Junior Grade, the Tomling Cup for the Intermediate, and the Deans Trophy for the Senior Grade. However, this record has been superseded by Ratu Kadavulevu School in 2017 who won all grades age-wise (Under-14 to Under-19 trophies).

Marist Brothers High School (MBHS) won the Deans Trophy on 5 occasions and drew twice. They first won was in 1965.

Suva Grammar School (SGS) have won the Deans Trophy on 2 occasions and drew once. They first won in 2001 and have recently won in 2026.

Latter Day Saints (LDS) College, Nasinu Teachers' College, and Navuso Agricultural College each won the trophy once. Provincial School Eastern (now RKS) have won the trophy twice.

Ratu Navula College, a school from Nadi in the Western Division of Fiji's main island, Viti Levu, won the trophy in the 2013 Fiji Secondary Schools Rugby Union Coke Zero Deans Competition. Ratu Navula College's Dream Team was undefeated from the Under 15 grade in 2010 right up to the Under 18 Grade in 2013.

== List of past winners ==
Deans Trophy Champions by year
| Season No: | Year | Champion | Coach | Result | Runner up | Coach | Reference |
|---|---|---|---|---|---|---|---|
| 1 | 1939 | QVS (Queen Victoria School) | | | | | |
| 2 | 1940 | QVS | | | | | |
| 3 | 1941 | QVS | | | | | |
| 4 | 1942 | QVS | | | | | |
| 5 | 1943 | QVS | | | | | |
| 6 | 1944 | LMS (Lelean Memorial School) | | | | | |
| 7 | 1945 | PSS (Provincial School Southern – later to be moved to Lodoni, Tailevu and renamed Ratu Kadavulevu School, RKS) | | | | | |
| 8 | 1946 | PSS | | | | | |
| 9 | 1947 | QVS | | | | | |
| 10 | 1948 | LMS | | | | | |
| 11 | 1950 | LMS/NTC (Nasinu Teachers' College) | | | | | |
| 12 | 1951 | LMS | | | | | |
| 13 | 1952 | LMS/QVS | | | | | |
| 14 | 1953 | QVS | | | | | |
| 15 | 1954 | LMS/QVS | | | | | |
| 16 | 1955 | LMS | | | | | |
| 17 | 1956 | QVS | | | | | |
| 18 | 1957 | QVS | | | | | |
| 19 | 1958 | No competition (Due to an epidemic that had struck Fiji in that year) | | | | | |
| 20 | 1959 | LMS | | | | | |
| 21 | 1960 | LMS | | | | | |
| 22 | 1961 | RKS | | | | | |
| 23 | 1962 | RKS | | | | | |
| 24 | 1963 | RKS/QVS | | | | | |
| 25 | 1964 | RKS | | | | | |
| 26 | 1965 | MBHS (Marist Brothers High School) | | | | | |
| 27 | 1966 | QVS | | | | | |
| 28 | 1967 | NAS (Navuso Agricultural School) | | | | | |
| 29 | 1968 | QVS | | | | | |
| 30 | 1969 | MBHS (Marist Brothers High School) | | | | | |
| 31 | 1970 | QVS | | | | | |
| 32 | 1971 | RKS | | | | | |
| 33 | 1972 | LMS/MBHS | | | | | |
| 34 | 1973 | RKS | | | | | |
| 35 | 1974 | QVS | | 10 - 4 | RKS | | |
| 36 | 1975 | RKS | | | | | |
| 37 | 1976 | MBHS | | | | | |
| 38 | 1977 | MBHS | | | | | |
| 39 | 1978 | RKS/MBHS | | | | | |
| 40 | 1979 | LMS | | | RKS | | |
| 41 | 1980 | RKS | | | LMS | | |
| 42 | 1981 | RKS | | | | | |
| 43 | 1982 | RKS | | | LDS | | |
| 44 | 1983 | RKS | | | QVS | | |
| 45 | 1984 | RKS | | 6-0 | QVS | | |
| 46 | 1985 | RKS | | 8 - 3 | MBHS | | |
| 47 | 1986 | LDS (Latter Day Saints College) | | | RKS | | |
| 48 | 1987 | RKS | | | LDS | | |
| 49 | 1988 | RKS | | 19 - 17 | NSS (Nasinu Secondary School) | | |
| 50 | 1989 | RKS/QVS | | | - | | |
| 51 | 1990 | RKS/QVS | | | - | | |
| 52 | 1991 | RKS | | | QVS | | |
| 53 | 1992 | RKS | | | SGS | | |
| 54 | 1993 | RKS | | | SGS | | |
| 55 | 1994 | LMS | | | RKS | | |
| 56 | 1995 | RKS | | | LMS | | |
| 57 | 1996 | QVS | Filimoni Vatuvoka | | RKS | | |
| 58 | 1997 | QVS | Filimoni Vatuvoka | | RKS | | |
| 59 | 1998 | QVS | Filimoni Vatuvoka | | RKS | | |
| 60 | 1999 | QVS | Filimoni Vatuvoka | 10-9 | NSS | | |
| 61 | 2000 | LMS | | | QVS | | |
| 62 | 2001 | SGS | Kuliniasi Naucabalavu | 34–10 | RKS | | |
| 63 | 2002 | RKS | Epeli Nabatisila | 24-3 | RSMS(Ratu Sukuna Memorial School) | | |
| 64 | 2003 | QVS | Elemaca Ravulo | | RKS | | |
| 65 | 2004 | QVS/LMS | Elemaca Ravulo(QVS) | A Score Draw this final | | | |
| 66 | 2005 | RKS/SGS | Falaola Wainiqolo (SGS) | 19-all | | | A Score Draw this final |
| 67 | 2006 | LMS | | 27 – 5 | SGS | Mr Smith | |
| 68 | 2007 | QVS | Elemaca Ravulo | 7 – 5 | RKS | | |
| 69 | 2008 | LMS | | 20 – 8 | RKS | Mr Tawake | |
| 70 | 2009 | LMS | | 30 – 8 | NSS | Joni Tabakau | |
| 71 | 2010 | LMS | | 36 – 18 | RKS | Joni Tabakau | |
| 72 | 2011 | QVS | Atanasio Dianirova | 19 – 13 | RNC | | |
| 73 | 2012 | QVS | Akuila Matabalei | 31 – 21 | NSS(Nasinu Secondary School) | | |
| 74 | 2013 | RNC (Ratu Navula College) | Josaia Rokomarawa | 19 – 16 | QVS | | |
| 75 | 2014 | LMS | Laitia Masi | 13 – 8 | RKS | | |
| 76 | 2015 | RKS | | 8 – 5 | MBHS | | |
| 77 | 2016 | QVS | Elemaca Ravulo Josaia Waiwalu | 21 – 18 | MBHS | | |
| 78 | 2017 | RKS | Epeli Vukivuki | 20 – 5 | Queen Victoria School | | |
| 79 | 2018 | RKS | Epeli Vukivuki | 20 – 0 | Cuvu College | | |
| 80 | 2019 | QVS | Saimoni Liutaki/Isimeli Koroi | 13 – 12 | RKS | | |
| 81 | 2020 | COVID-19 Pandemic (No match) | | | | | |
| 82 | 2021 | COVID-19 Pandemic (No match) | | | | | |
| 83 | 2022 | MBHS | Jone Temo | 9–8 | Suva Grammar School | | |
| 84 | 2023 | QVS | Pedro Waqa | 24–15 | Natabua High School | | |
| 85 | 2024 | QVS | Josaia Waiwalu | 27–13 | Nasinu Secondary School | | --> |
| 86 | 2025 | RKS | Isaia Naqicatabua | 53-15 | Nasinu Secondary School | | |
| 87 | 2026 | SGS | Epeli Osborne | 36–21 | Lelean Memorial School | | |

== See also ==
- Fiji Rugby Union (FRU)
- List of oldest rugby union competitions
