= Anthony Wise =

- Born: 12 May 1982 (age 44) Suva, Fiji
- Height: 6 ft 2 in (188 cm)
- Weight: 222 lb (101 kg)
- School: Suva Grammar School

Rugby union career
- Position: Back-row / Lock
Provincial / State sides
Years	Team	Apps	(Points)
2012	Waikato	6	(5)
2013–17	King Country	46	(55)
International career
Years	Team	Apps	(Points)
2009–10	Fiji	3	(0)

Anthony Wise (born 12 May 1982) is a Fijian former international rugby union player.

Wise attended Suva Grammar School and was in their 2001 Deans Trophy-winning side, alongside future international players Wame Lewaravu, Sakiusa Matadigo and Manoa Vosawai.

A back-rower and lock, Wise captained the Fiji Warriors and was capped three times for the national team, debuting off the bench against Japan in the 2009 IRB Pacific Nations Cup. He started as a blindside flanker against the Wallabies at Canberra Stadium in 2010 and made another appearance against Japan in that year's Pacific Nations Cup.

Wise played club rugby in New Zealand for Otorohanga and broke into the Waikato provincial side in 2012. He then competed in provincial rugby with King Country from 2013 to 2017.

== See also ==
- List of Fiji national rugby union players
