= Suva Grammar School =

Secondary school in Vuya Road, Nasese Suva, Fiji

Coordinates: 18.1605°S 178.4375°E

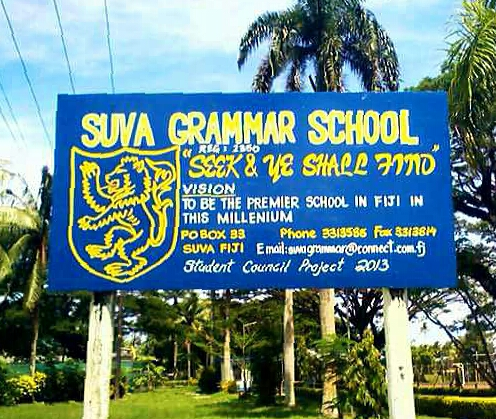
- Vuya Road, Nasese Suva; Fiji

Information
- Type: Day School (Secondary Education)
- Motto: "Seek and Ye Shall Find"
- Denomination: General Christian based education
- Established: 1917; 109 years ago (on present site since 1960 - the celebrated date of foundation)
- Principal: Iosefo Masivue(2020)
- Gender: Mixed-sexed education (Coeducational)
- Age: 13 to 19
- Enrollment: Approx. 1,200 (as of February 2024)
- Average class size: 40 to 50 students in a class.
- Language: English
- Colours: Gold and Blue Attire (Males): Safari shirt, Pocket Sulu Attire (Females): Sleeveless Dress
- Nickname: Grammarians OR Lions

Suva Grammar School (or SGS) is a secondary school in Suva, Fiji. The school caters 6 streams for Forms 3 (Year 9) to 6 (Year 12) and 4 streams for Form 7 (Year 13). Suva Grammar has a school population of approximately 1200 students (as of February 2024). The school is considered to be one of Fiji's premier schools. The school's location is near the heart of the city and by the seaside. They are known to be very competitive in sports–particularly in athletics at secondary school level during the annual Coca-Cola games and in the local secondary school's rugby union competition, the annual Deans Trophy, against rival competitors Marist Brothers High School, QVS, Lelean Memorial School and RKS and other sports including basketball, netball, swimming, and cricket. They include a variety of clubs such as chess, taekwondo, swimming, drama and art.

== History ==
In 1918, the British colonial government established its first school in Suva.

In 2004 the school, in cooperation with police, launched a pilot "Scholastic Crime Stoppers" programme targeting drug use, truancy and other problems.

In 2008, members of the Suva Grammar Old Students Association made a request to the Fijian Minister for Education for school principal Ilikimi Kunagogo to be removed.

In 2011, in conjunction with the Ministry of Health, Grammar heads signed a partition in which Suva Grammar School was declared the first drug-free secondary institution in the country.

== Sports ==
Suva Grammar Ruggers

Suva Grammar has won the coveted prize of school boys' rugby, the Deans Trophy on two occasions in 2001 and 2026 and played to a draw with Ratu Kadavulevu School in 2005. They were finalists in 1992, 1993, 2006 and 2022.

Suva Grammar Athletics

Reigning Coca-Cola Games champions in the boys division of the Fiji Secondary School's athletics competitions from 2007–2011, having successfully defended their title for 5 straight years before losing the reigns to rival competitors Marist Brothers High School in 2012. Suva Grammar School won another title (boys division) in 2022. SGS has now won the Coke Games Boys title 7 times. Suva Grammar has also won the Coke Games Girls Division 4 times.

Suva Grammar Athletics Placing
Year	Suva Zone II	Coca Cola Games
2022	Boys 1st Girls 1st	Boys 1st Girls 2nd
2023	Boys 2nd Girls 1st	Boys 3rd Girls 2nd
2024	Boys 2nd Girls 1st	Boys 2nd Girls 2nd
2025	Boys 2nd Girls 1st	Boys 2nd Girls 5th
2026	Boys 2nd Girls 1st	Boys 4th Girls 6th

Lions Cheerleaders

Suva Grammar is also noted for their renowned pom pom girls, who have been a fixture at the Annual Coca-Cola Games since 2002. Revamping the 'Fiji style' of cheerleading in 2009 before introducing co-ed cheerleading at the 2010 Coca-Cola Games, a testament to the Grammarian trailblazing spirit of innovation and ingenuity in the lead-up to the school's Golden Jubilee celebrations later in July. Grammar's influence in this aspect of secondary school life remains prevalent today with 2017 Coke Games Girls division champions ACS, revamping their own iconic cheerleading squad and other schools starting cheerleading squads as well such as Ballantine Memorial School, western prominent schools Saint Thomas High School, 2015 & 2017 Coke Games Boys division champions Natabua High School and 2014–2016 Coke Games Girls division champions Jasper Williams High School, and even Saint John's College Cawaci from Ovalau.

Suva Grammar Ballers

Suva Grammar also creates an opportunity for students to play basketball participating in zone and nationals. They won the title in 2022 of the Suva Zone under 19 boys beating schools including Ratu Kadavulevu School, Yat Sen Secondary School, International School Suva, and their long-time rivals Marist Brothers High School.

Suva Grammar Cricket

Suva Grammar’s cricketers came third in the 2024 Cricket Fiji U19 Boys Nationals.

Suva Grammar Netters

Lioness Netters clean swept the girls division in 2023 winning the all the grades. While they held the Mens title in 2022, the Lions lost it to Yat Sen Secondary School in the following year. Suva Grammar now currently hold only the Under 15 title.

== Notable alumni ==
=== Politics, business and academia ===
- Mick Beddoes, MP and Leader of the Opposition
- Krishna Datt, government minister
- Tupou Draunidalo, lawyer
- Jone Madraiwiwi, vice president of Fiji
- John Maynard Hedstrom, Legislative Council member
- Laisenia Qarase, prime minister of Fiji
- Richard Naidu, lawyer
- Nazhat Shameem, High Court judge and Permanent Representative to the UN
- George Speight 2000 Coup leader
- Sree Sreenivasan, journalism professor and chief digital officer
- Samisoni Tikoinasau, government minister

=== Sport ===
- Makelesi Bulikiobo - National Sprint-Queen who won the 200m event at the 2007 South Pacific Games.
- Jone Delai - Former national sprint-king, now Head-Coach of the Suva Grammar athletics squad.
- Sakiusa Matadigo - Suva Rugby, also a Flying Fijian,
- Wame Lewaravu - Suva Rugby, Sale Sharks (England) and also a Flying Fijian
- Manoa Vosawai - Treviso (Italy)
- Akapusi Qera - Nadroga Rugby, Gloucester Rugby (England), Fiji Rugby
- Nikola Matawalu - Fiji Seven's, Flying Fijians
- Henry Seniloli - Flying Fijians
- Niko Verekauta - Wardens Rugby, Fiji Seven's
- Saimoni Vaka - Agen (France)
- Taqele Naiyaravoro - Glasgow Warriors (Scotland), currently New South Wales Waratahs (Australia) & occasional Wallabies Winger
- Samuela Vunisa - Azzurri Rugby
- Jerry Yanuyanutawa - Flying Fijians, Glasgow Warriors (Scotland). He grew up in Fiji, where he represented their Under-21 side.
- Viliame Mata - Fiji Seven's, Nadroga
- Sekonaia Kalou - Flying Fijians
- Matila Vocea - National Rep Netball
- Viliame Takayawa - National Rep Judoka, Japan Based
- Bill Gadolo - National rep Rugby, Coach and Teacher

=== Arts ===
- Robin Lovejoy - Australian actor and director. He grew up in Fiji.
