= Craig Clarke =

New Zealand rugby player (born 1983)

- Full name: Craig Brian James Clarke
- Born: 1 August 1983 (age 43) Masterton, New Zealand
- Height: 200 cm (6 ft 7 in)
- Weight: 115 kg (254 lb; 18 st 2 lb)
- School: Gisborne Boys' High School

Rugby union career
- Position: Lock
Senior career
Years	Team	Apps	(Points)
2005–2006	Crusaders	3	(0)
2005–2006	Canterbury	17	(10)
2007–2012	Taranaki	69	(5)
2008	Hurricanes	14	(0)
2009–2013	Chiefs	71	(10)
2013–2014	Connacht	15	(0)
- Correct as of 30 May 2020
International career
Years	Team	Apps	(Points)
2004	New Zealand U21	5	(0)
2009	Junior All Blacks	2	(5)
- Correct as of 30 May 2020
Coaching career
- Years: Team
- 2019–: Taranaki (assistant)
- Correct as of 30 May 2020

Craig Brian James Clarke (born 1 August 1983) is a retired rugby union player from New Zealand. He played as a lock during his career, winning two Super Rugby titles with the Chiefs where he served as captain. He also captained Taranaki in the ITM Cup. Before his retirement he was playing for the Irish provincial team Connacht in the Pro12, and served as the team captain. Clarke's ability to anticipate play and adaptability to the referee's rulings are two of his key attributes.

== Early career ==
Born in the Wairarapa, Clarke grew up in Poverty Bay, where he attended Gisborne Boys' High School. He had originally moved to Canterbury on a scholarship to the Canterbury Rugby Union and to Canterbury University to study geology. He made his debut for Canterbury in a Ranfurly Shield match against Marlborough.

== Professional club career ==
=== New Zealand ===
During Clarke's domestic career he has reached the quarter-finals of New Zealand's National Provincial Championship on three occasions, once with Canterbury in the 2006 season, and twice with Taranaki in their 2007 and 2008 campaigns. He has also played in two semi-finals, again with Canterbury and Taranaki in 2005 and 2012 respectively, but has never played in a final. He became a Crusaders Wider Training Group member in 2005, making his Super 12 debut against the Reds, he went on to gain two more caps later that year. In 2007 he again made the Crusaders Wider Training Group which only prompted a move to the Hurricanes. Clarke was capped 13 times for the Hurricanes in 2008, including seven starts at lock.

Clarke was drafted to the Chiefs for the 2009 season, and was of their most consistent performers towards the Super 14 final against the Bulls. In the final, however, the Chiefs were beaten convincingly, with a final score of 61–17. He then re-signed with the Chiefs in 2010 and 2011, with the team finishing both years in tenth place. In the 2012 season, Clarke was co-captain of the side as the team won its first ever title, beating the Sharks 37–6 in the final. The following season Clarke led the team to another final, this time facing the Brumbies. The Chiefs became the 4th Super Rugby franchise to record back to back title wins, when they beat the Australian side 27–22, with this being Clarke's final game for the team.

=== Move abroad ===
Clarke joined Irish provincial team Connacht in the Pro12, ahead of the 2013–14 season, having signed a three-year contract. With Connacht bottom of the Pro 12 after a poor run of form, which culminated in a 43–10 defeat against Edinburgh, Clarke was made Connacht's team captain. He captained the team in one of their greatest ever victories as they beat four time European champions Toulouse away in the Stade Ernest-Wallon, in the Heineken Cup pool stages.

Clarke's first season with Connacht was ended prematurely when he was forced to take a break from the game indefinitely, due to concerns for his health after he suffered his tenth concussion in less than two years in a Heineken Cup match with Saracens on 18 January 2014. In June of that year Clarke announced his retirement from rugby on medical advice.

== International career ==
Clarke was part of New Zealand's under-age international set up. Clarke was involved in the New Zealand under 19 team when they won the Under 19 Rugby World Championship that took place in Italy in 2002, beating the French U19s in the final. He was also part of the Under 21s in 2004, when they won the Under 21 Rugby World Championship in Scotland, this time beating Ireland in the final.

In 2009, Clarke was called up to play for New Zealand's secondary international side, the Junior All Blacks. Although Clarke, then aged 26, had played only sixteen matches for the Crusaders and Hurricanes, the Junior All Black coaches selected him as cover for Bryn Evans for the Pacific Nations Cup. Clarke's international test debut came against Samoa at Apia Park on 12 June 2009, when he replaced Tom Donnelly after 56 minutes. He was named to start in the next match against Japan, where on his first start, Clarke scored a try before half-time in a 52–21 victory.
