= Sisa Waqa =

Fiji dual-code rugby international footballer (born 1986)

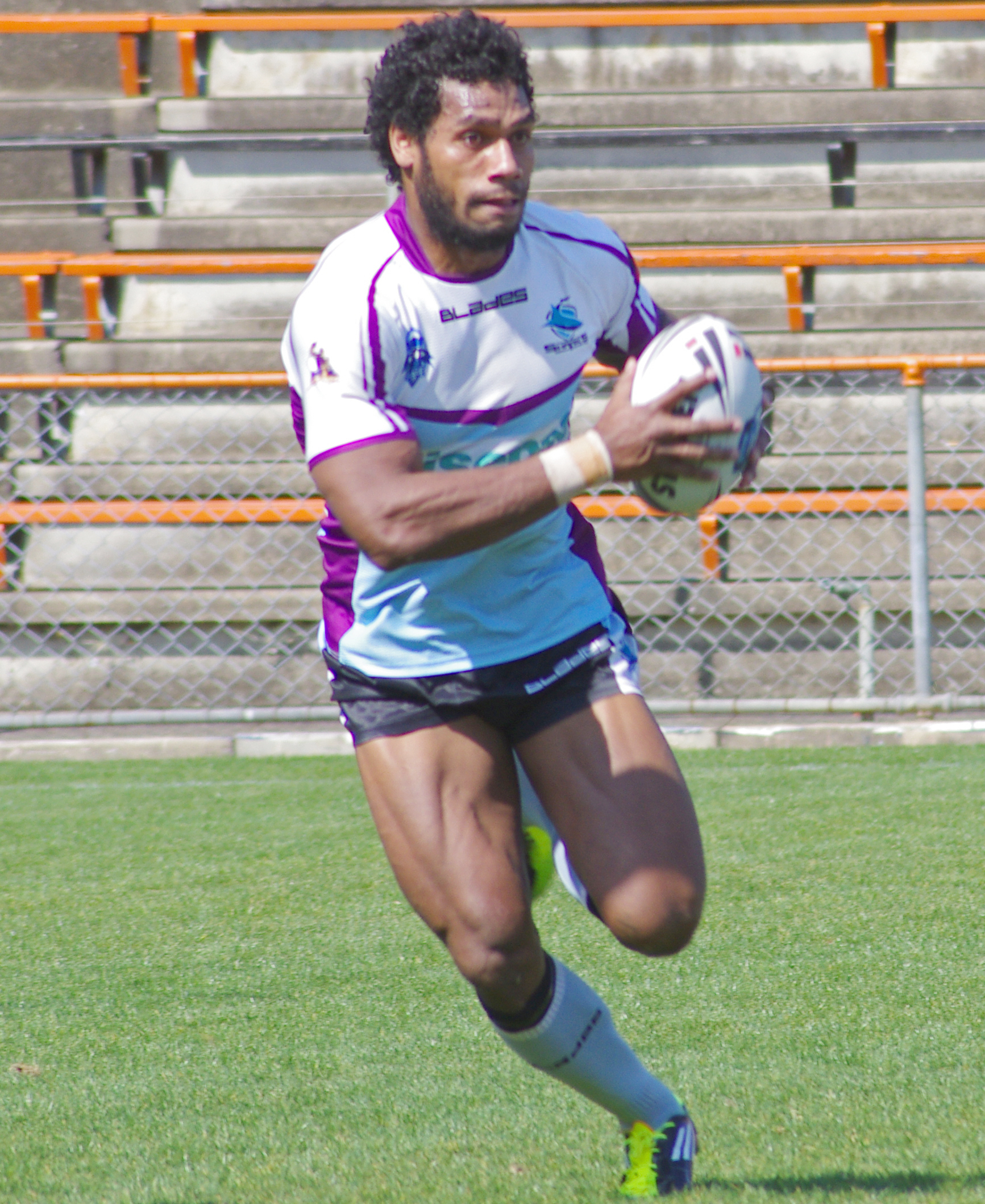

Personal information
- Full name: Sisa Ledua Waqa
- Born: 29 April 1986 (age 40) Suva, Fiji
- Height: 186 cm (6 ft 1 in)
- Weight: 98 kg (15 st 6 lb)

Playing information

Rugby league
- Position: Wing, Centre
Club
Years	Team	Pld	T	G	FG	P
2009–10	Sydney Roosters	7	2	0	0	8
2011–14	Melbourne Storm	67	41	0	0	164
2015–16	Canberra Raiders	21	6	0	0	24
	Total	95	49	0	0	196
Representative
Years	Team	Pld	T	G	FG	P
2013–16	Fiji	6	2	0	0	0

Rugby union
- Position: Centre, Wing, Fullback
Club
Years	Team	Pld	T	G	FG	P
2016–17	Grenoble	9	1	0	0	5
Representative
Years	Team	Pld	T	G	FG	P
2007	Fiji	1	0	0	0	0

Sisa Waqa (born 29 April 1986) is a Fijian retired professional rugby footballer who last played for FC Grenoble in French Rugby Union. A Fiji international representative, Waqa primarily played on the wing. Waqa previously played for the Sydney Roosters in 2009, Melbourne Storm between 2011 and 2014, where he won the 2012 NRL premiership and the Canberra Raiders between 2015 and 2016.

== Early life ==
Born in Suva, Fiji the son of former Fiji rugby union international and former Fiji national sevens assistant coach Etuate Waqa.

Waqa was educated at Ratu Kadavulevu School and was a member of the Deans Trophy-winning side in 2005 (which was shared with Suva Grammar School). He also represented 2006 Fiji Under 18s and 2006 Fiji Rugby Under 20s.

Waqa made a brief appearance for the Fiji national rugby union team in 2007 when he came off the bench as flyhalf in the 78th minute of a match against Australia A. Waqa moved to Sydney, Australia in 2008, where he played for Gordon RFC in the Shute Shield. He was offered a contract with the ACT Brumbies in the Super 15 competition, but the deal fell through as the Brumbies had already reached their foreign-player allowance.

== Playing career ==
=== 2009 ===
On 3 December 2008, Waqa signed a two-year contract with the Sydney Roosters starting from the 2009 NRL season. In Round 4 of the 2009 NRL season against the Parramatta Eels, Waqa made his NRL debut for the Sydney Roosters on the wing in the Roosters 24–6 win at SFS. In round 14 against the Gold Coast Titans, Waqa scored his first and second NRL career tries in the Roosters 24–20 loss at Central Coast Stadium. Waqa finished the 2009 NRL season with him played in 7 matches and scored 2 tries for the Sydney Roosters as the club finished last on the table and claimed the wooden spoon for the first time since 1966.

=== 2010 ===
Waqa then signed a three-year contract to play for French top-14 club US Montauban, however that fell through due to the club experiencing financial difficulties. Waqa then played in Sydney for the 2010 season in the local competition for Southern Districts before Melbourne Storm coach Craig Bellamy was notified of his availability.

=== 2011 ===
After a three-month trial during the pre-season, Waqa was signed to a one-year contract after impressing throughout the trial matches. Waqa has been playing in the NSW Cup for Melbourne Storm feeder team Cronulla-Sutherland Sharks, who have a joint venture with the Melbourne Storm.

In round 9 of the 2011 NRL season, Waqa made his Melbourne Storm debut against the Broncos on the wing, scoring a try in the Storms' 29–22 win at Suncorp Stadium. After the Storms' match against the Manly-Warringah Sea Eagles at Brookvale Oval, Waqa was suspended for one week over the incident between Adam Blair and Glenn Stewart after he came from the bench to pull players off and to assist Blair in the 5-on-1 fight in the Storms' 18–4 loss. Waqa finished the 2011 NRL season with him playing in 10 matches and scoring 4 tries for the Storm.

=== 2012 ===
In round 4 against his former club the Sydney Roosters, Waqa played his first match in the 2012 NRL season in the Storms’ 44–4 victory over the Sydney Roosters at AAMI Park. Since that game Waqa struggled to make it into the first grade side and was playing in the NSW Cup for the Cronulla-Sutherland Sharks. Waqa returned to first grade in round 19 against the North Queensland Cowboys in the Storms' 20–16 loss at AAMI Park. Waqa retained his wing spot for the rest of the 2012 season after when regular Storm winger Matt Duffie suffered a shoulder injury. Waqa starred on the wing in the Melbourne Storms' 2012 NRL Grand Final victory over the Canterbury-Bankstown Bulldogs, his outstanding defensive strategy, which assisted the Storm to a 14–4 point victory over the minor premiers. Waqa finished the 2012 NRL season with him played in 11 matches and scoring 7 tries for the Storm.

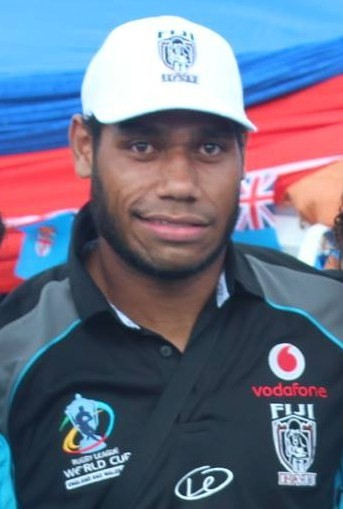
Waqa in 2013

=== 2013 ===
On 22 February 2013, Waqa played in the Storm's World Club Challenge match against 2012 Super League premiers Leeds Rhinos, Waqa played on the wing in the Storms' 18–14. After the WCC victory, Waqa injured his hand on a piece of glass in a hotel room incident missed first 8 weeks of the 2013 season. Waqa played in 22 matches and scored 12 tries for the Storm in the 2013 NRL season. Waqa was named in the Fiji squad for the 2013 World Cup. Waqa played in 4 matches.

=== 2014 ===
In February 2014, Waqa was included in the Storms' inaugural 2014 Auckland Nines squad. On 21 July 2014, Waqa announced that he signed a 2-year deal with the Canberra Raiders commencing in 2015. In Round 22 against the Newcastle Knights, Waqa scored 4 tries in the Storms' shock 32–30 loss after giving away a 30–20 lead with 3 minutes to go at Hunter Stadium. Waqa scored a try in his last match for the Storm in Melbourne's 28–4 Finals Week 1 defeat by the Canterbury-Bankstown Bulldogs at AAMI Park. Waqa finished the 2014 NRL season as the Storms' highest tryscorer with 18 in 24 matches.

=== 2015 ===
On 17 January 2015, Waqa was named in the Raiders 2015 Auckland Nines squad. In round 1 of the 2015 NRL season against the Cronulla-Sutherland Sharks, Waqa made his club debut for the Canberra Raiders on the wing, scoring a try in the Raiders 24–20 win at Remondis Stadium. In August 2015, there were rumours about Waqa was seeking a release from the Raiders to sign a three-year deal with a French rugby union club but later decided to stay out his 2-year commitment with the club. Waqa finished his first year with the Canberra Raiders with him playing 21 matches and scoring 6 tries in the season.

=== 2016 ===
On 30 January 2016, Waqa was named in the Raiders 2016 Auckland Nines squad. On 14 March, Waqa was confirmed to be released from his contract at the end of June to join Top 14 rugby union side, Grenoble. On 7 May 2016, Waqa played for Fiji against Papua New Guinea in the 2016 Melanesian Cup where he played at centre in the 24–22 loss at Parramatta Stadium.

=== 2017 ===
On 16 May 2017, Waqa was in talks to rejoin former club Melbourne but the move never eventuated. On 12 December 2017, Waqa made the headlines for the wrong reasons. He was reported to have borrowed money to pay off alleged gambling debts but never paid the money back to his victims. In one case, Waqa reportedly borrowed $12,000 off a student he had befriended. He also reportedly owed money to The Salvation Army, when a worker from The Salvation Army attended Waqa's rental property they found nobody at the residence and Waqa's car had all four of its wheels slashed and both tail lights knocked out.

=== Post-playing career ===
Waqa now resides in Pilbara working on the railways in regional Western Australia. He has four children.
