= Maʻasi =

Maʻasi is a surname. Notable people with the surname include:

- Ilaisa Ma'asi (born 1982), Tongan rugby union player
- Losaline Maʻasi (fl. 2017), Tongan politician
- Rekeiti Ma'asi-White (born 2003), English rugby union player
- Viliami Maʻasi (born 1975), Tongan rugby union player
