= Ilivasi Tabua =

Australia & Fiji international rugby union player

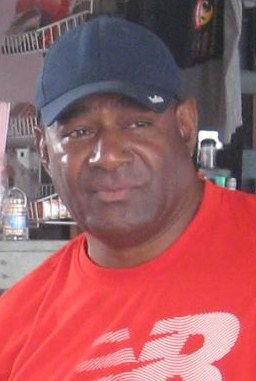
- Born: Ilivasi Sevia Tabua Tamanivalu; 30 September 1964 (age 62) Naivicula, Fiji
- Height: 6 ft 4 in (1.93 m)
- Weight: 233 lb (106 kg)
- Occupation: Former Fiji coach

Rugby union career
- Position: Flanker
Senior career
Years	Team	Apps	(Points)
1990-1995	GPS Rugby		
1998-1999	Honda Heat		
Provincial / State sides
Years	Team	Apps	(Points)
1990-1995	Queensland		
International career
Years	Team	Apps	(Points)
1990	Fiji	2	(0)
1993-1995	Australia	10	(15)
1998-1999	Fiji	14	(0)
Coaching career
- Years: Team
- 2007-2009: Fiji

Ilivasi Sevia Tabua Tamanivalu (born 30 September 1964 in Naivicula) is a Fijian former rugby union footballer who played at international level for both Fiji and Australia as a flanker. He was nicknamed The Human Skewer.

He also coached Fiji at the 2007 Rugby World Cup.

== Career ==
Tabua played for Australia sevens team in the 1993 Rugby World Cup Sevens, after which he played for Australia in fifteens in the 1995 Rugby World Cup. He has played 10 tests for Australia. In the 1999 Rugby World Cup he played for the Fiji team.

== Personal life ==
He was raised in a family of seven siblings, five boys and two girls. His son is named Ilivasi Noah Taminivalu. He later left Noah and his mother. He spent the first 12 years of his childhood in the Lau group as his father was a teacher at one of the schools on the chiefly island. Ilivasi started school at Mabula, Cicia in Lau before his family moved to the mainland in the 1970s. His family settled at Naivicula, Tailevu where his father comes from. He attended Marist Brothers High School. In 1980, Ilivasi left to further his studies in Australia.

== Coaching career ==
After retiring from international rugby, he came back to Fiji to help the Fiji team to prepare for the 2007 Rugby World Cup. He was recently appointed the head coach of Fiji's HPU and helped the former Fiji coach Wayne Pivac with the Fiji team, but when Pivac resigned from Fiji rugby in January 2007, Tabua was picked as the man to replace him and he was chosen as the new coach. He was also the first Fijian to be appointed the national coach to the Rugby World Cup. He comes at the tail end of a succession of expatriates including George Simpkin, Brad Johnstone, Greg Smith, Mac McCallion and Pivac who left in January 2007. On 19 August 2009 Tabua was sacked by the Fiji Rugby Union citing off-field incidents during Fiji's 2009 IRB Pacific Nations Cup campaign.

== Notes and references ==
Sporting positions
Preceded by (New Zealand) Wayne Pivac	Fiji National Rugby Union Coach; 2007-2009	Succeeded by (Fiji) Sam Domoni
