= Eneriko Buliruarua =

Fijian rugby union player (born 1997)

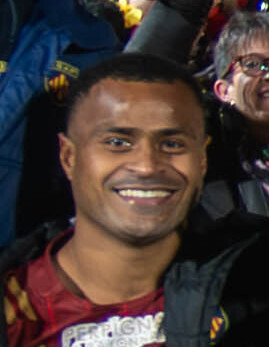
- Born: 23 January 1997 (age 29) Vaturova, Fiji
- Height: 186 cm (6 ft 1 in)
- Weight: 105 kg (231 lb; 16 st 7 lb)

Rugby union career
- Position: Centre / Wing
- Current team: Perpigan
Senior career
Years	Team	Apps	(Points)
2018–2019	Toulon	3	(10)
2019–2021	Brive	32	(30)
2021–2022	La Rochelle	18	(20)
2022-2024	Bayonne	27	(10)
2024-present	Perpignan	31	(30)
- Correct as of 28 March 2026
International career
Years	Team	Apps	(Points)
2021–	Fiji	3	(0)
- Correct as of 28 March 2026

Eneriko Buliruarua (born 23 January 1997 in Vaturova, Fiji) is a Fijian rugby union player who plays for Bayonne in the French Top 14. His playing position is centre or wing. He made his debut for Fiji in 2021 against New Zealand.

Riko as he is affectionately known, attended Marist Brothers High School, Fiji where he played for their 1st XV rugby team in the Deans Trophy final in 2015 where he was spotted by RC Toulonnais scouts and offered a contract to play professionally in France.
