= Naibuka Vuli =

Fijian rugby union player (born 1960)

- Born: 6 June 1960 (age 66) Fiji
- Height: 5 ft 9 in (1.75 m)
- Weight: 224 lb (102 kg)
- Notable relative: Sunia Koto (nephew)
- Occupation: Senior immigration officer

Rugby union career
- Position: Prop
Amateur team(s)
| Years | Team | Apps | (Points) |
| – | Queen Victoria School | | |
Senior career
| Years | Team | Apps | (Points) |
| 1987-1989 | Nadi | | |
| 1990-1991 | Lautoka | | |
| 1992-1993 | Nadi | | |
International career
| Years | Team | Apps | (Points) |
| 1991-1993 | Fiji | 5 | (0) |

Naibuka Vuli (born 6 June 1960) is a Fijian former rugby union player and immigration officer. He played as prop.

== Career ==
He was educated at Queen Victoria School, for whose rugby team he played at club level. Vuli also played for Nadi Rugby Union from 1987 to 1989 and 1992 to 1993. He was captain of the undefeated Lautoka Rugby Union team in 1990 to 1991. His first cap for Fiji was during the 1991 Rugby World Cup in France, where he played the match against France, in Grenoble, on 8 October. He played two matches in the tournament. In 1992, he was the captain of the Flying Fijians. His last international cap was on 17 July 1993, in the match against Tonga, in Nuku'alofa.

== After career ==
After his retirement, Vuli became Senior Immigration Officer. In 2009, he was charged with 12 counts of extortion and a count of abuse of office. Between 2007 and 2009, Vuli was accused of abusing his authority by housing illegal immigrants at a private property without the approval of the Public Service Commission.

== Personal life ==
His nephew is Fijian rugby union player Sunia Koto and his son is Sitiveni Rabuli, also a rugby union player, who played for Cross Keys RFC. Vuli is also a spokesman of the Methodist Church of Fiji and Rotuma in California.
