= Ilikena Bolakoro =

Fiji international rugby union player

- Full name: Ilikena Cina Bolakoro
- Born: 22 August 1987 (age 39) Suva, Fiji
- Height: 5 ft 11 in (180 cm)
- Weight: 222 lb (101 kg)
- School: Suva Grammar School

Rugby union career
- Position: Centre / Wing
Senior career
Years	Team	Apps	(Points)
2007–12	Biarritz Olympique	84	(70)
2012–16	Colomiers Rugby	94	(60)
2016–17	SA XV Charente	25	(20)
2017–21	USON Nevers	59	(10)
2021–24	US Dax	48	(15)
International career
Years	Team	Apps	(Points)
2009–11	Fiji	2	(0)

Ilikena Cina Bolakoro (born 22 August 1987) is a Fijian former professional rugby union player.

== Biography ==
Bolakoro was educated at Suva Grammar School and represented Fiji at the 2006 Under 19 World Championship.

Based in France through his career, Bolakoro got signed by Biarritz as a schoolboy and when he arrived at the club in 2006 stayed with their winger Sireli Bobo, who had helped recruit him. He won a European Challenge Cup title in his final year with Biarritz in 2012, then moved on to Colomiers, where Fiji lock Wame Lewaravu would be a teammate. In 2016, Bolakoro was signed by SA XV Charente and took part in the club's inaugural season in the Pro D2. He played for USON Nevers from 2017 to 2021, before rounding out his career with three seasons at US Dax.

Bolakoro was capped twice for Fiji, appearing first as a centre against Samoa in the 2009 IRB Pacific Nations Cup, then winning his second cap as a winger against the same opponent in the 2011 edition of the tournament.

== See also ==
- List of Fiji national rugby union players
