= Colin Slade =

NZ international rugby union player

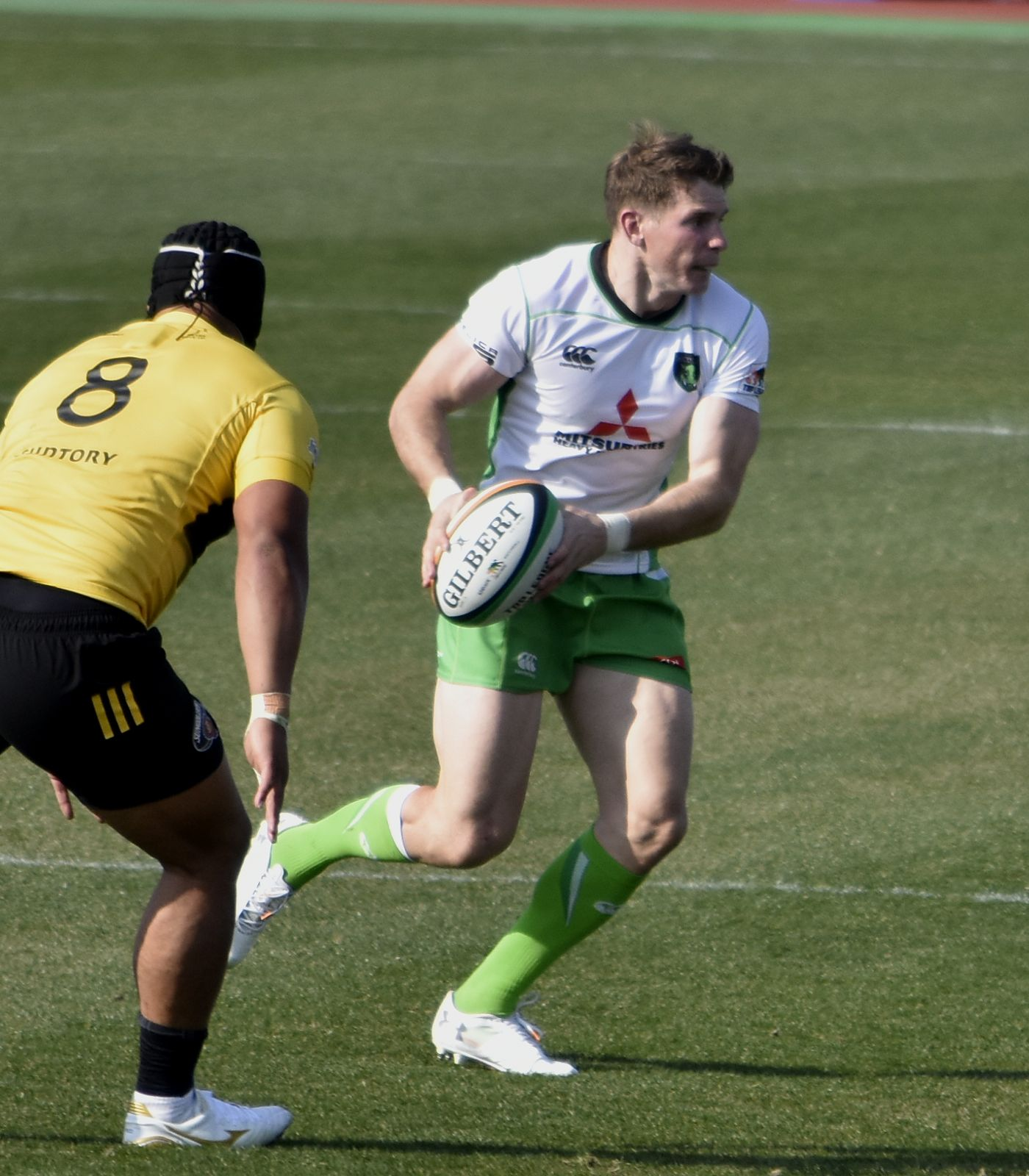
- Slade for Mitsubishi DynaBoars in 2021
- Full name: Colin Richard Slade
- Born: 10 October 1987 (age 39) Christchurch, New Zealand
- Height: 183 cm (6 ft 0 in)
- Weight: 90 kg (198 lb; 14 st 2 lb)
- School: Christchurch Boys' High School
- University: University of Canterbury

Rugby union career
- Position(s): First five-eighth, Fullback, Wing
Senior career
Years	Team	Apps	(Points)
2008–2015	Canterbury	45	(313)
2009–10,14-15	Crusaders	57	(348)
2011–2013	Highlanders	21	(182)
2015–2020	Pau	84	(533)
2020-2022	Mitsubishi Dynaboars	10	(56)
- Correct as of 22 November 2022
International career
Years	Team	Apps	(Points)
2006	New Zealand U19	5	(61)
2007	New Zealand U21	1	(3)
2009	Junior All Blacks	4	(30)
2010–2015	New Zealand	21	(78)
2010	New Zealand Barbarians	1	(7)
2014, 2019	Barbarian F.C.	2	(19)
- Correct as of 22 November 2022

Colin Richard Slade (born 10 October 1987) is a retired New Zealand professional rugby union player. He played primarily at first five-eighth, as well as all other backline positions on occasions. He was first selected for the All Blacks in 2009. He was a key member of the 2011 Rugby World Cup winning team. He was also included in the 2015 Rugby World Cup, but played in only one match against Namibia. He thus became one of only 44 players who have won the Rugby World Cup on multiple occasions.

== Playing career ==
=== School boy rugby ===
While at Christchurch Boys' High School, Slade played two years for the 1st XV, winning two National titles in both years playing alongside fellow All Blacks Matt Todd and Owen Franks as well as former Crusaders players Nasi Manu and Tim Bateman.

=== Provincial Rugby ===
Slade made his debut for Canterbury playing first five in the 2008 Air New Zealand Cup, and scored 86 points for his side as Canterbury won the competition. His performances improved substantially as the season progressed and with Dan Carter unavailable and Stephen Brett injured, Slade became the first choice 10 for the Canterbury side.

In the 2009 Air New Zealand Cup, Slade shifted to fullback as Stephen Brett was again healthy and reclaimed the number 10 jersey. Despite the shift in position, Slade didn't miss a beat as he started 14 games as one of the leading fullbacks in the competition, scoring 4 tries over the course of the season (including two outstanding tries in the final) as Canterbury again emerged champions.

For the 2010 ITM Cup, Slade reclaimed the starting first five position for Canterbury – along with first-choice goal-kicking duties – and emerged as one of the most dominant players in the competition. Despite missing games while with the All Blacks, Slade scored 152 points in just 11 starts to finish 2nd in the competition to Lachie Munro. He also led Canterbury to their third consecutive title, sealing victory in the final against Waikato with a fine individual try.

=== Super Rugby ===
Slade's performance in the 2008 Air New Zealand Cup caught the eye of Crusaders coach Todd Blackadder who included Slade into the squad for the 2009 season. Playing mainly out of position on the wing, he emerged as a regular member of the squad, making 11 starts as well as a substitute appearance in the semi-final against the Bulls.

For the 2010 Super 14 season, Slade was shifted to fullback, as he had been in the previous Air New Zealand Cup. His season was highlighted by a 21-point performance against the Lions on 20 March and his first Super Rugby try against the Stormers on 20 April.

In an effort to get more playing time at his favoured position of first five-eighth, Slade transferred to the Highlanders for the 2011 Super Rugby season. However, his season would be blighted by injury, beginning with a broken jaw suffered in a preseason game that ruled him out of the first 5 matches of the competition. After three solid performances in Highlander victories, he suffered a second broken jaw in his third game back, ruling him out for the rest of the season. Slade's terrible luck with injuries continued into 2012 as his season was again cut short after suffering a broken leg in March against the Brumbies in Canberra.

After the unsuccessful Highlanders 2013 season, Slade decided to return to the Crusaders for 2014. With Carter away for much of the season, Slade took claim of the no.10 jersey for the season and showed great form throughout the competition. His goal kicking was particularly strong kicking at 82% and totalling 198 points for the season. Despite Carter's return, Slade's form was such that he managed to retain the number 10 jersey with Carter playing in the no.12 jersey. The Crusaders would later, however, lose the final to the Waratahs in Sydney.

The 2015 super rugby season was another strong season for Slade managing again to establish himself as the number 10 for the Crusaders. However, the Crusaders' season would not go to plan, failing to make the playoffs.

=== International Rugby ===
A former member of New Zealand U-19 and U-21 sides, Slade was selected for the Junior All Blacks side for the 2009 IRB Pacific Nations Cup scoring 30 points including a try against Japan. On the back of that solid performance, he was selected into the All Blacks training squad for the third leg of the Tri Nations Series although he didn't see any game action.

In 2010, Slade was called up again as a replacement for injured fly-half Dan Carter for the All Blacks final match in the 2010 Tri-Nations against the Wallabies on 11 September. He made his All Black debut off the bench in the 60th minute coming on as a replacement for Aaron Cruden.

Slade then made a mark in New Zealand's friendly against Fiji in July 2011. He scored a try, two penalties and four conversions for the All Blacks. He then played in New Zealand's opening Tri-Nations game against South Africa and scored New Zealand's sixth try of the match, resulting in victory by 40–7. He came on as a substitute in New Zealand's next match against Australia. He got his first Tri-Nations start against South Africa in the All Blacks penultimate game.

He was selected for the 2011 Rugby World Cup and came on as a substitute in the opening match where he scored a conversion after Ma'a Nonu's try. After Dan Carter injured his groin and was forced out of the 2011 Rugby World Cup it was announced that Slade would become the All Blacks starting fly-half for the remainder of the World Cup. After having a 'horror' Tri-Nations game against the Springboks and an 'ordinary' first World Cup game, the public of New Zealand initially doubted the ability of Slade to perform in Carter's absence. However, Coach Graham Henry voiced his trust in Slade, urging the New Zealand supporters to give him their full support. Slade then aggravated a groin tear injury during the Argentina game and was ruled out of the rest of the Cup.

During the 2014 game against the Springboks at Ellis Park Slade played in the unfamiliar position of halfback due to injury to the replacement halfback Tawera Kerr-Barlow. He also kicked a last minute conversion in the All Blacks final Bledisloe Cup match against Australia in Brisbane. Slade was also called into the End of Year Tour and started a test match on the right wing and also made a strong appearance from bench in the All Blacks final game against Wales in Cardiff.

In 2015 Slade was named in the 2015 World Cup All Black squad only playing against Namibia on the road to winning the title.

=== Club Rugby ===
On 14 April 2015, it was announced Slade had signed a two-year deal with French Pro D2 side Pau as the team was promoted to Top 14.

Against	Pld	Won	Drawn	Lost	Tries	Con	Pen	DG	Pts	P. won
Argentina	4	4	0	0	0	1	1	0	5	100
Australia	5	5	0	0	0	1	0	0	2	100
Canada	1	1	0	0	0	4	1	0	11	100
Fiji	1	1	0	0	1	4	2	0	19	100
France	1	1	0	0	0	0	0	0	0	100
Japan	1	1	0	0	1	9	0	0	23	100
South Africa	3	1	0	2	1	0	0	0	5	33.33
Tonga	1	1	0	0	0	1	0	0	2	100
Wales	1	1	0	0	0	1	0	0	4	100
Scotland	1	1	0	0	0	1	0	0	5	100
Samoa	1	1	0	0	0	1	0	0	0	100
Namibia	1	1	0	0	0	1	0	0	2	100
Total	21	19	0	2	3	24	5	0	78	90.4

Pld = Games Played, W = Games Won, D = Games Drawn, L = Games Lost, Tri = Tries Scored, Con = Conversions, Pen = Penalties, DG = Drop Goals, Pts = Points Scored
