= Sean Romans =

- Born: Sean Romans; 27 July 1985 (age 41) Christchurch, New Zealand
- Height: 178 cm (5 ft 10 in)
- Weight: 88 kg (13 st 12 lb)
- University: Otago

Rugby union career
Senior career
Years	Team	Apps	(Points)
2011-2015	Nottingham	76	(25)
Provincial / State sides
Years	Team	Apps	(Points)
2008-2011	Otago	43	(10)
Super Rugby
Years	Team	Apps	(Points)
2009-2011	Highlanders	11	(0)
International career
Years	Team	Apps	(Points)
2009	Junior All Blacks	2	(0)

Sean Romans (born 27 July 1985 in Christchurch, New Zealand) is a retired rugby union player who played at scrum-half for Nottingham. He previously played for the Highlanders and Otago.

== Playing career ==
=== Provincial Rugby ===
Romans made his debut for Otago in the 2007 Air New Zealand Cup and emerged as a regular for the 2008 Air New Zealand Cup. For the 2009 Air New Zealand Cup, Romans was named vice-captain of the squad.

Romans is a second-generation member of the Otago side, following in the footsteps of his father Mark.

=== Super Rugby ===
On the back of his showings for Otago in the Air New Zealand Cup, Romans earned a contract with the Highlanders for the 2009 Super 14 season to serve as a backup to team captain and All Black Jimmy Cowan.

=== International Play ===
Romans was selected for the Junior All Blacks for the 2009 IRB Pacific Nations Cup, where he came on as a substitute against Samoa and started in a 52-21 victory over Japan.
