= Ernest Skelton =

- Born: 28 May 1977 (age 49)
- Height: 5 ft 11 in (180 cm)
- Weight: 231 lb (105 kg)

Rugby union career
- Position: Prop
Super Rugby
Years	Team	Apps	(Points)
2007	Reds	3	(0)
International career
Years	Team	Apps	(Points)
2009	Samoa	4	(5)

Ernest Skelton (born 28 May 1977) is an Australian-Samoan former professional rugby union player.

Skelton was originally a Deception Bay rugby league player, until receiving a 10-year ban in 1999 for striking a touch judge, after he had been sent off during a second division semi-final. An attempt to switch codes ended up in the Queensland Supreme Court and he was permitted to play rugby union from June 2004.

A prop, Skelton got picked up by the Queensland Reds from Wests to play in the 2006 Australian Provincial Championship and the following year made three Super 14 appearances after being called up as injury cover. He played international rugby with Samoa in 2009, featuring against Japan and Tonga at the Pacific Nations Cup, then in two matches against PNG which secured Samoa qualification for the 2011 World Cup.

Skelton has five sons, including rugby player Jeral Skelton.
