= Alando Soakai =

NZ rugby union player

- Born: Alando Soakai; 11 May 1983 (age 43) Auckland, New Zealand
- Height: 1.82 m (6 ft 0 in)
- Weight: 103 kg (227 lb)
- School: Auckland Grammar School
- University: University of Otago

Rugby union career
- Position: Flanker
Senior career
Years	Team	Apps	(Points)
2011–2016	Kubota Spears	30	
Provincial / State sides
Years	Team	Apps	(Points)
2004	Southland	7	(0)
2005–2010	Otago	61	(40)
Super Rugby
Years	Team	Apps	(Points)
2007–2011	Highlanders	58	(15)
International career
Years	Team	Apps	(Points)
- NZ Sevens
–	Junior All Blacks	4	(0)
Medal record
Men's rugby sevens
Representing New Zealand
Commonwealth Games
Gold medal – first place	2006 Melbourne	Team competition

Alando Soakai (born 11 May 1983 in West Auckland) is a former professional rugby union player from New Zealand. He is currently the head coach of the Wellington Lions in the National Provincial Championship. He is best known for his time with the Highlanders in Super Rugby and Otago in the ITM Cup, and as captain of Otago in their 2009 and 2010 campaigns. He currently serves on the coaching staff of the Kubota Spears in the Japan Rugby League One, the club where he finished his playing career.

== Coaching career ==
=== Japan ===
Soakai closed out his career with the Tokyo-based Kubota Spears in 2015-16 season as a player-coach. Following his retirement, Soakai transition into full time coaching. 2022 Soakai went onto coach the Japan National Development Squad which successfully beat Uruguay in a test match.

== Playing career ==
=== Provincial Rugby ===
Soakai was educated at Auckland Grammar School. Soakai shifted south to Dunedin in 2002 to attend the University of Otago, eventually signing to play provincial rugby for Otago.

After spending the 2004 season on loan with Southland, Soakai made his debut for Otago in 2005 and by the 2006 Air New Zealand Cup was a regular starter for the squad. In ensuing seasons, he developed into one of Otago's most reliable players, and was selected team captain for the 2009 Air New Zealand Cup.

In the 2010 ITM Cup, Soakai made his 50th appearance for Otago and set a personal best with 3 tries over the course of the season, but endured a difficult season as captain as the team had a disastrous year to finish dead last in the competition.

He played over fifty games in club rugby for Kaikorai Demons in the local Dunedin competition.

=== Super Rugby ===
Soakai was selected to the Highlanders squad for the 2007 Super 14 season, and appeared in all but one game for the team including 7 starts. After a mass exodus from the club following the 2007 Rugby World Cup, Soakai solidified his spot as the team's starting openside flanker in 2008.

Soakai continued to be a fixture for the Highlanders through the 2009 and 2010 Super 14 seasons, starting 12 out of the 13 matches in both years.

Following the 2011 season, Soakai left New Zealand to sign in Japan with the Kubota Spears.

=== International Play ===
Soakai is an accomplished rugby sevens New Zealand Sevens player, and has represented New Zealand and won a Commonwealth Games gold medal in Melbourne in 2006 and an IRB World Sevens Series title in 2007.

A strong 2009 Super Rugby season, Soakai was selected to the Junior All Blacks for the 2009 IRB Pacific Nations Cup. He appeared in all 4 games in the tournament, including a start against Japan, as the squad swept their way to victory.

2010, Soakai earn the opportunity to captain the New Zealand Barbarians against the New Zealand Maori, marking 100 years of Maori Rugby.

Having played for the Junior All Blacks and the New Zealand Sevens team, Soakai was ineligible to take advantage of his ancestry to play for Tonga.
