= Jonah Lowe =

New Zealand rugby union player (born 1996)

- Full name: Jonah Hunuhunu Lowe
- Born: 9 May 1996 (age 30) Hastings, New Zealand
- Height: 184 cm (6 ft 0 in)
- Weight: 100 kg (220 lb; 15 st 10 lb)
- School: King's College
- Notable relative: Karl Lowe (brother)

Rugby union career
- Position(s): Wing, Centre
- Current team: Hawke's Bay, Toshiba Brave Lupus
Senior career
Years	Team	Apps	(Points)
2015–	Hawke's Bay	85	(152)
2018–2020	Hurricanes	4	(0)
2021–2022	Chiefs	18	(35)
2023–2026	Highlanders	34	(80)
2026–	Toshiba Brave Lupus	0	(0)
- Correct as of 23 July 2026
International career
Years	Team	Apps	(Points)
2016	New Zealand U20	6	(20)
2017	New Zealand Barbarians	1	(0)
2018–	Māori All Blacks	6	(25)
- Correct as of 27 July 2025

Jonah Lowe (born 9 May 1996) is a New Zealand rugby union player, who currently plays as a wing or centre for Hawke's Bay in New Zealand's domestic National Provincial Championship competition and Toshiba Brave Lupus Tokyo in the Japan Rugby League One.

He previously played for the Highlanders, Chiefs and Hurricanes in Super Rugby. He has also played for the Maori All Blacks.

== Early career ==
Lowe was born and raised in Hastings, and is a younger brother of former Māori All Blacks, Hurricanes and Hawke's Bay loose forward Karl Lowe.

Lowe initially attended St. John's College in Hastings, before moving to Auckland where he went to King's College for his final two years of high school. While there, he turned out for the college's first XV. In 2013, he helped them reach the semi-finals of Auckland's 1A Rugby Competition and finished on top of the individual 1A try-scoring ladder. In 2014, he also played for Auckland and the Blues at under-18 level.

After graduating high school, Lowe headed back home to his native Hawke's Bay where he played for Clive Rugby & Sports Club in the province's club rugby competition. In February 2015, he was named in the first Under 20 team in the Hurricanes' history for a game against their Blues counterparts.

== Senior career ==
In 2015, his first year out of school, Lowe was named in the Hawke's Bay ITM Cup squad. He made his Magpies debut against Canterbury - in the 13 jersey - on 12 September 2015. He played two more games that first season. Since then, he has cemented himself as a regular starter for the Magpies. Lowe's personal stats over the years have been excellent, including several tries and try assists each season. During the 2020 Mitre 10 Cup season, the Magpies won the Ranfurly Shield (taking it off Otago), were successful in three more Ranfurly Shield defences (against Northland, Manawatu and Wellington), and won the Mitre 10 Cup Championship. Lowe scored two tries in the Championship Final against Northland, helping his team secure a well-deserved promotion to the Premiership division.

Following the 2016 Mitre 10 Cup season, at the end of which Lowe was named 'Magpies Back of the Year', he was called up by the Hurricanes as cover for injured Hawke's Bay team mate Geoff Cridge. He trained with the Hurricanes during preseason and played for the franchise at the 2017 Brisbane Global Rugby Tens. Following that tournament, he was offered a full Hurricanes contract.

Lowe was - for the first time - named in the Hurricanes squad for the 2018 Super Rugby season. On 26 May 2018, he made his Super Rugby and Hurricanes debut against the Crusaders. Due to an unfortunate string of injuries, as well as otherwise being given limited playing opportunities, Lowe only played four games for the Hurricanes during his years at the franchise.

At the end of 2020, Lowe moved franchises and was named in the Chiefs squad for the 2021 Super Rugby season. He made his debut for the franchise on 5 March 2021 against the Highlanders and scored his first Super Rugby try on 17 April 2021 against the Crusaders. He played two seasons for the Chiefs in which he played 18 games and scored 7 tries. His most memorable game during this time was the Chiefs' 51–27 win over the Waratahs on 22 April 2022, in which he scored 4 tries.

On 23 June 2022, the Highlanders announced that Lowe had signed a three-year contract with the Dunedin-based franchise. Highlanders Head Coach Clarke Dermody mentioned: "What I like most about Jonah is the combination of pace and power that he possesses, and they are two great assets for any winger. He will strengthen our outsides and in combination with our other Jona (Nareki) will give us some more strike force out wide. I also like his work ethic, he’s a busy player that works hard with and without the ball." Lowe made his Highlanders debut on 25 February 2023 against the Blues.

Lowe left the Highlanders at the end of the 2026 Super Rugby Pacific season, having played 34 games for the franchise.

On 23 July 2026, Toshiba Brave Lupus Tokyo announced the signing of Lowe ahead of the 2026–27 Japan Rugby League One season. He would join the club after one more season playing for the Hawke's Bay Magpies.

== International career ==
In 2014, Lowe was named in the New Zealand Secondary Schools team that played matches against Australian Schools and Fiji Schools.

Two years later, he was selected for the New Zealand Under-20 side that competed at the 2016 Oceania Rugby Under 20 Championship and 2016 World Rugby Under 20 Championship.

In 2017, Lowe was part of the New Zealand Provincial Barbarians team that played the opening game of the 2017 British & Irish Lions tour to New Zealand.

A year later, Lowe - who is of Ngāti Pikiao descent - was a member of the Māori All Blacks squad that toured the United States, Brazil and Chile. He made his Māori All Blacks debut on 3 November 2018 against the USA and scored a try in each of the three matches of the tour.
