= Sakiusa Matadigo =

Fiji international rugby union player

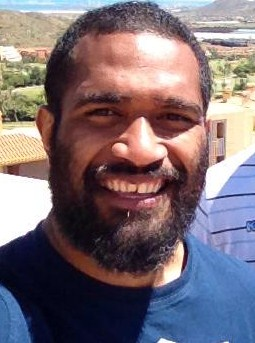
- Born: Sakiusa Masinivanua Matadigo; 8 August 1982 (age 44) Suva, Fiji
- Height: 6 ft 3 in (1.90 m)
- Weight: 17 st 2 lb (109 kg)
- School: Suva Grammar School

Rugby union career
- Position(s): Number eight, Flanker, Lock
Amateur team(s)
Years	Team	Apps	(Points)
2006–2007	Stade Nantais Rugby		
2002–2006	Nabua		
2004–2006	Suva		
2002–2003	Suva Colts		
- Correct as of 2007-11-07
Senior career
Years	Team	Apps	(Points)
2005–08	Suva Highlanders		
2007–08	Saracens	3	(10)
2008–09	Auch	29	(0)
2009–12	Montpellier Hérault RC	63	(30)
2012–14	Racing Métro	39	(25)
2014–16	Lyon	26	(15)
2016-	SO Chambery	61	(30)
- Correct as of 14 December 2019
International career
Years	Team	Apps	(Points)
2006–	Fiji	22	(5)
2006	Fiji Barbarians	4	
- Correct as of 6 October 2015
National sevens team
Years	Team		Comps
2005–	Fiji		
- Correct as of 2007-11-07

Sakiusa Masinivanua (Masi) Matadigo (born 8 August 1982) is a rugby union footballer who plays back row for Montpellier Hérault RC. He has been capped for the full Fiji national side, as well as representing Fiji at Sevens. Before moving to the Guinness Premiership in 2007, he had played representative rugby for Fiji Barbarians in the Pacific Rugby Cup and for Suva Highlanders in the Colonial Cup. His senior rugby career began playing for Suva suburb Nabua, as well as the full Suva F.C. side. His regular playing positions are Number eight, Flanker and Lock.

== Early life ==
Matadigo was born in Suva, Fiji on 8 August 1982 and educated at Suva Grammar School where, in 2001, his final year, he played at Number 8 in the side that won the school the Fiji secondary schools competition, the Deans Trophy for the first time in 62 years.

== Playing career ==
=== Nabua/Suva 2002–07 ===
Matadigo began his senior rugby career playing for the Nabua district of Suva while also playing for the colts division of the main Suva team. He made his senior debut for the Suva team in 2004.

2005 saw senior representative honours for Matadigo, first for Suva Highlanders in the Colonial Cup, which was to be a springboard to appearances in the famous Fiji Sevens side in the IRB Sevens World Series. During the year he played in the Dubai and George rounds of the 2005–06 World Sevens Series.

2006 saw his elevation to full 15-a-side Fiji national team, making his debut against Tonga on 10 June 2006.

The same year saw further involvement for Matadigo in the national Sevens sides campaign in the 2005–06 Sevens World Series, appearing at the Wellington, USA, Hong Kong and Singapore rounds of the tournament.

=== Stade Nantes 2006–07 ===
In the 2006–07 Matadigo travelled to experience European rugby, initially with Fédérale 3 side Stade Nantes Rugby.

=== Saracens 2007–08 ===
Following a personal recommendation from former Saracens and Fiji captain Simon Raiwalui, coach Alan Gaffney signed Matadigo, in time for the 2007–08 Guinness Premiership season. He was joined in the Saracens squad by former Flying Fijian captain Mosese Rauluni and another full Fiji international Kameli Ratuvou upon these existing Saracens players' return from the 2007 Rugby World Cup.

Matadigo made his debut first team appearance for Saracens against Worcester Warriors on 6 October 2007. His second appearance, against Sale Sharks two weeks later saw Matadigo score his maiden try for his new club.

=== Nabua/Suva 2008 ===
Matadigo returned to Suva in 2008.

=== Montpellier 2009–present ===
In 2009, Matadigo joined Montpellier Hérault RC in France's Top 14 Competition.
