= Sireli Ledua =

Fijian rugby union footballer (born 1985)

- Born: Sireli Ledua; December 12, 1985 (age 40) Suva, Fiji
- Height: 1.78 m (5 ft 10 in)
- Weight: 103 kg (16 st 3 lb)

Rugby union career
- Position(s): Hooker & Prop
- Current team: Flying Fijians
Senior career
Years	Team	Apps	(Points)
- Police

Sireli Ledua (born 12 December 1985 Suva, Fiji) is a Fijian rugby union footballer. He plays at hooker and prop for the Flying Fijians.
