= Iliesa Keresoni =

Fijian rugby union footballer (born 1987)

- Born: Iliesa Keresoni; January 27, 1987 (age 39) Tailevu, Fiji
- Height: 1.82 m (6 ft 0 in)
- Weight: 90 kg (14 st 2 lb; 198 lb)
- School: Lelean Memorial School
- Notable relative: Kameli Ratuvou (brother)

Rugby union career
- Position(s): Wing, Centre, Fullback
- Current team: CA Périgueux, France
Senior career
Years	Team	Apps	(Points)
2010/2011	CA Périgueux	15	(35)
- Correct as of 31 May 2010

Iliesa Keresoni (born 27 January 1987 in Fiji) is a Fijian rugby union footballer. He was the captain of the Lelean Memorial School 'Dream Team' of 2006 that won the Deans Trophy in the Fiji Secondary Schools Rugby Union competition of that year. He plays at fullback, wing and centre position for the Knights in the Colonial Cup and for the Fiji Warriors. He is the younger brother of Saracens centre, Kameli Ratuvou

Keresoni has three caps for the National Fijian team making his debut against Tonga in 2008 and played again for Fiji in 2010 against Japan where he scored a try. He played against New Zealand in 2011.

As of early 2010 he signed for Guinness Premiership runners-up Saracens.

He has played for the season 2010/2011 for CA Périgueux in the 3rd level of French championship. This team will play next season in Pro D2 (2nd division). Keresoni played his last professional match, against Wales, on 2 October 2011.

== See also ==
- Fiji Rugby Union
- Fiji Warriors
