= Karl Lowe =

- Born: Karl William Lowe; 17 September 1984 (age 42) Hastings, New Zealand
- Height: 1.81 m (5 ft 11 in)
- Weight: 104 kg (16 st 5 lb)
- School: Hastings Boys High School

Rugby union career
- Position: Flanker
Senior career
Years	Team	Apps	(Points)
2014–16	Canon Eagles	18	(5)
2016-2017	Provence Rugby		
- Correct as of 19 January 2015
Provincial / State sides
Years	Team	Apps	(Points)
2004–13	Hawke's Bay	100	(105)
- Correct as of 25 October 2013
Super Rugby
Years	Team	Apps	(Points)
2009–13	Hurricanes	41	(10)
- Correct as of 15 July 2013
International career
Years	Team	Apps	(Points)
2010, 2012, 2009	Maori All Blacks		
–	All Blacks XV		

Karl Lowe (born 17 September 1984) is a New Zealand rugby union footballer. Lowe is from Hastings and attended St Johns College and Hastings Boys High School. Lowe's younger brother is Jonah Lowe.

== Career ==
=== Club rugby ===
In 2004, Lowe debuted for Hawke's Bay against the Bay of Plenty Steamers. Lowe went on to play 100 first class games for the province between 2004 and 2013.

In 2009, Lowe was selected for the Hurricanes, where he spent 5 years playing for the franchise.

In 2014, Lowe left for offshore and signed a 2-year contract with Japanese club Canon Eagles, in the Top League.

For the 2016–17 season, Lowe signed with French rugby club Provence Rugby, in Aix en Provence, in the south of France.

=== International ===
Lowe was selected in the 2009 Junior All Blacks for the Pacific Nations Cup. Lowe was part of the 2010 and 2012 Maori All Blacks tours.

Lowe scored a try against Ireland, in the Maori All Blacks' win in 2010.
