= Viliame Seuseu =

Fijian rugby union player (born 1984)

- Born: 14 April 1984 (age 42) Lautoka, Fiji
- Height: 6 ft 2 in (188 cm)
- Weight: 264 lb (120 kg)

Rugby union career
- Position: Prop
International career
Years	Team	Apps	(Points)
2008–09	Fiji	8	(5)

Viliame Seuseu (born 14 April 1984) is a Fijian former international rugby union player.

Born in Lautoka, Seuseu was a specialist prop, capable of playing both the loose-head and tight-head positions.

Seuseu played international rugby with the Flying Fijians in 2008 and 2009, gaining eight caps. His four appearances in 2008 were all off the bench, then in 2009 he started four matches for Fiji, which included a fixture against Ireland at RDS Arena in Dublin. He served as a stand in captain for Nadi during the 2009 Farebrother-Sullivan Trophy.

== See also ==
- List of Fiji national rugby union players
