= Kini Murimurivalu =

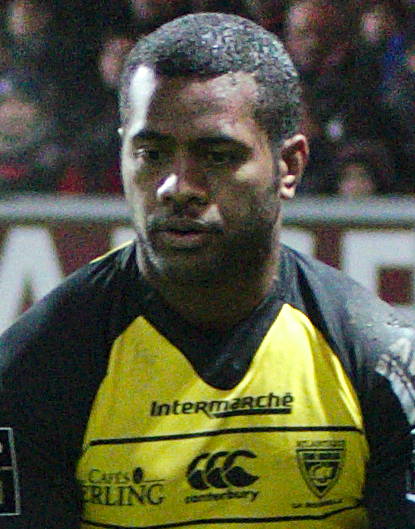
- Born: 15 May 1989 (age 37)
- Height: 1.76 m (5 ft 9 in)
- Weight: 101 kg (223 lb; 15.9 st; 223 lb)
- School: Queen Victoria School (Fiji)

Rugby union career
- Position: Wing/Fullback
Senior career
Years	Team	Apps	(Points)
2009–2012	Clermont	18	(20)
2012–2020	La Rochelle	134	(168)
2020–2023	Leicester Tigers	40	(30)
2024	USA Limoges		
- Correct as of 19 October 2022
International career
Years	Team	Apps	(Points)
2011–2023	Fiji	43	(39)

Kini Murimurivalu (born 15 May 1989) is a former Fijian rugby union player. He usually played as a Wing or fullback. He was part of the Fiji team at the 2011 Rugby World Cup where he played in three matches, he made his international debut in 2011.
