= Mateo Malupo =

Tongan rugby union player (born 1988)

- Born: Mateo Vakatalau Malupo; 7 July 1988 (age 38)
- Height: 1.80 m (5 ft 11 in)
- Weight: 93 kg (14 st 9 lb)
- School: Tupou College

Rugby union career
- Position(s): Wing, Fullback
Provincial / State sides
Years	Team	Apps	(Points)
2010–13	Northland	24	(35)
2015–	Olimpia București	8	(11)
- Correct as of 29 May 2015
International career
Years	Team	Apps	(Points)
2009–11	Tonga	4	(0)
- Correct as of 7 August 2013
National sevens team
Years	Team		Comps
2009	Tonga		2
- Correct as of 8 March 2009

Mateo Vakatalau Malupo (born 7 July 1988) is a Tongan rugby union player. He plays wing for Tonga on international level. Malupo also plays for Olimpia București in their SuperLiga campaign.
