= Yoshitaka Nakayama =

Japanese politician

- 中山義隆

Mayor of Ishigaki, Okinawa
- In office March 20, 2010 – June 29, 2025
- Preceded by: Nagateru Ohama

Personal details
- Born: June 26, 1967 (age 59) Ishigaki, Okinawa, USCAR

Yoshitaka Nakayama (中山義隆, Nakayama Yoshitaka) is a Japanese politician and the current mayor of Ishigaki. Nakayama was re-elected in 2022, with endorsements by the Liberal Democratic Party and Komeito.

In 2020, Nakayama passed a bill changing the name of Tonoshiro (a locale in Ishigaki) to “Tonoshiro Senkaku”, as the Senkaku Islands are a de facto part of Tonoshiro in an administrative sense. This was immediately condemned by both China and Taiwan, who also claim sovereignty over the Senkaku Islands (also known as Diaoyu Islands).

In June 2025, the Ishigaki Council found that some health insurance budget was not discussed via the council, and Nakayama declared false statements to the council. Public distrust of Nakayama started to arise. On June 18, the Ishigaki Council passed a motion of no confidence against the Nakayama cabinet. On 29 June, Nakayama agreed to resign, stating that dissoluting the parliament didn't make sense.
