= Yat Sen School =

School in Suva, Fiji

Coordinates: 18°8′48.4″S 178°26′14.65″E

Yat Sen Primary and Secondary School (traditional Chinese: 逸仙學校; simplified Chinese: 逸仙学校; pinyin: Yìxiān Xuéxiào) is a Chinese primary and secondary school located in Suva, Fiji.

It was opened on June 15, 1936, under the name of Chinese School. In 1976, the name was changed to Yat Sen, after Sun Yat-Sen, a Chinese revolutionary, and a founding father of the Republic of China. It is supported by Board of the Chinese Education Society, the PTFA, and old ex-scholars.

Emphasis is placed on academic excellence and self-discipline. From 17 students initially, it has grown to over 1,100 students. Approximately 400 are in the secondary school, and 700 in the primary school.

The school is the first in the nation to have its own Artificial Intelligence (AI) facility, that was donated from Guangzhou, the capital of Guangdong, a province in China.

The school has also been used for several competitions, especially in the field of badminton, such as the Oceania Junior Championships, where the likes of Verdet Kessler has played.

== Notable students ==
- Dixon Seeto
- Vicky Wu
