= Alefoso Yalayalatabua =

Fijian rugby union player (1977–2020)

- Born: 22 January 1977 Suva, Dominion of Fiji
- Died: 18 July 2020 (aged 43) Suva, Fiji
- Height: 1.80 m (5 ft 11 in)
- Weight: 106 kg (16 st 10 lb)

Rugby union career
- Position: Prop
Senior career
Years	Team	Apps	(Points)
2003 - 2003	Namosi		
2007 - 2007	Highlanders		
2007 - 2007	Fiji Warriors		
2008 -	Suva		
International career
Years	Team	Apps	(Points)
2007 - 2010	Fiji	10	(0)

Alefoso Yalayalatabua (22 January 1977 – 18 July 2020) was a Fijian rugby union player. He played as a prop. He played for Fiji Warriors.

== Career ==
Yalayalatabua was first capped for Fiji, on 19 May 2007, aged 30, in a 3–8 loss to Samoa. He was in his country's squad at the 2007 Rugby World Cup finals, playing a single game, in the 12–55 loss to Australia. He had 10 caps for his national side, without ever scoring.

His ties to the Fijian military hindered his international career because of New Zealand and Australia's ban on the Fiji military, which meant he would not be able to compete at the 2011 Rugby World Cup.
