= Ratu Kadavulevu School =

Coordinates: 17.7251°S 178.5559°E

- Lodoni, Tailevu, Viti Levu, Fiji

Information
- Motto: "Dui Mate Ga E Nona Ucu Ni Vatu"
- Principal: Mr.Ilaisa Tukana Waqalala
- Gender: Single-sex education (Male)
- Colour(s): Navy Blue & Gold Uniform: Standard shirt Pocket Sulu

Ratu Kadavulevu School is a school in Lodoni, Fiji. It has some 1000 boarding students and 100 dayscholar students and is the largest boarding schools in the South Pacific Region. Its students are multiracial, but predominantly indigenous Fijians.

The school was founded in 1924 as the Provincial School Eastern by high chief Ratu Penaia Kadavulevu and was later renamed in his honor.

Ratu Kadavulevu School consists of four houses: RATU SUKUNA (Red), MAAFU (Blue), DEGEI (Yellow), CAKAU (Green).

== Notable alumni ==
- Ilaitia Tuisese - Captain of Fiji Rugby 7s Team to Hong Kong 1977, Fiji Rugby Hall of Fame Inductee
- Bole, Filipe - Former Minister for Education
- Luke Daunivalu - Ambassador and Deputy Permanent Representative of Fiji to the UN
- Nakaitaci, Noa - Current French rugby winger
- Qarase, Laisenia - Former Prime Minister
- Sauturaga, Vereniki - Former Flying Fijians Frontrower
- Isi Naisarani - Melbourne Rebels Current Wallabies Number 8
- Rabeni, Seru - Former Flying Fijians centre
- Rawaqa, Turuva - Flying Fijians lock
- Ducivaki, Mosese - Flying Fijians Frontrower
- Veitokani, Alivereti - Flying Fijians Fullback
- Veitayaki, Joeli - Flying Fijians Frontrower
- Tagicakibau, Luke - Flying Fijians Frontrower
- Nagusa, Timoci - Former Flying Fijians Utility Back
- Nagusa, Nemani - Flying Fijians Utility
- Sivivatu, Sitiveni - Former All Blacks wing
- Waqa, Sisa- Former Melbourne Storm and Canberra Raiders wing
- Talemaitoga, Tuapati- Flying Fijians Hooker
- Kenatale, Nemia- Flying Fijians Halfback
- Seniloli, Henry- Flying Fijians Halfback
- Dominiko Waqaniburotu - Current Flying Fijians Captain
- Jone Naqica - Former USA Eagles, USA 7s Captain
- Paula Dranisinikula - Current Fiji 7s Captain
- Viliame Mata - Flying Fijians Flanker
- Nat Saumi - Former Flying Fijians Rep, Rugby Director RKS
- Bolatagane, Kelemedi - Former Fiji Barbarians Halfback
- Mesake Ravonu - Former Fiji Bati and Canterbury-Bankstown Bulldogs Forward
