= Queen Victoria School (Fiji) =

Coordinates: 17°39′S 178°35′E

- Tailevu, Viti Levu, Fiji

Information
- Type: Government
- Motto: Floreat Viti - "Forward Fiji"
- Established: 1906; 120 years ago
- Principal: Saimoni Nalewabau
- Campus: Country
- Color: Blue
- Nickname: Vulinitu/Vulinituraga/Matavatucou/Nukuvuto - School for Chiefs
- Website: www.vulinitu.com/index.html

Queen Victoria School (QVS) is a school in Fiji. It was established in 1906 in Nasinu to provide education to the sons of Fijian Chiefs. It later moved to Nanukuloa in Ra when World War II broke out; then the school was moved to Lodoni where the two schools QVS and RKS operated side by side before eventually moving to its current site at Matavatucou, Tailevu. It then accepted students from Fijian villages based on their results in a secondary entrance examination.

The school is run as an academic college, but there is an adjoining farm which provides food to the school and serves as a training ground. Students are taught basic skills like crop and livestock husbandry, and there is a small dairy unit. These sessions usually last for about three hours and take place on Saturday morning. There is a farm manager and some permanent labourers who live on the compound.

The school is equipped with a library, chemistry and biology laboratories, computer lab and playing fields. This school takes part in cadet training and march for the passout parade. In Fiji, it is well known for high discipline.

Queen Victoria School consists of four houses: VERATA (blue), REWA (yellow), BAU (green) and TOVATA (red).

The school has a chapel in a position high on a hill and overlooking the sea and surrounding hills. The services are mainly Methodist, but other denominations are catered for. There is a school choir that performs at the Sunday morning service.

Rugby is a popular sport; ex-students have played in rugby teams in Fiji and abroad. The school has won the Deans Trophy for a record 26 times, the most number of wins in Dean's Rugby history. QVS is well known for partaking in the Secondary Schools Athletics meet, Secondary School Rugby League and the Deans trophy Rugby Cup.

== Notable staff and students ==
- Bavadra, Dr Timoci - Prime Minister of Fiji 1987, ousted by the Rabuka coup of 1987.
- Bokini, Ratu Ovini, Late Turaga na Tui Tavua, former Chairman of Great Council of Chiefs
- Bole, Filipe - Former Minister for Education and former Deputy Prime Minister
- Cakobau, Ratu Sir George - former Governor-General of Fiji
- Cokanasiga, Joketani - Former Minister for Primary Industries
- Cavubati, Bill - heaviest Prop in international Rugby
- Cawaki, Joeli - Commissioner Western and Assistant Minister for Agriculture and National Disaster Management.
- Delai, Adriu - Flying Fijians outside center
- Delana, Lagisoa Rabo, former Agricultural Tribunal, Independent Arbitrator, Commissioner Western, Minister for Fijian Affairs (ALTA) in Rabuka SVT Government
- Dimuri, Josefa - Senator and Minister for Information.
- Dolokoto, Mesulame - Former Headboy and rugby captain(2013), ACT Brumbies winger.
- Doviverata, Alifereti - Fiji Rugby Captain
- Ganilau, Penaia - former Governor-General of Fiji and first President of Fiji
- Iloilo(vatu) Uluivuda, Ratu Josefa - Senator and President of Fiji 2001 - 2009
- Kalou, Joeli - Cabinet Minister 1987, 1995, Senator 2000-2004 and former Government Whip and Leader of the House
- Lauti, Toalipi - former Prime Minister of Tuvalu
- Luveniyali, Waisea Fijian International Fly-half
- Malani, Ratu Wilisoni, Headboy 1940, Cricket Captain 1940, Fijian Chief-Turaga Gonesau, Medical Doctor, SVT-Ra Constituency Parliamentarian 1994-1999.
- Manueli, Paul - former Commander Royal Fiji Military Forces
- Mara, Ratu Sir Kamisese - first Prime Minister of Fiji and second President of Fiji
- Murimurivalu, Kini - Fijian International Fullback
- Nailatikau, Ratu Epeli - former Commander, Royal Fiji Military Forces (1982–1987), diplomat, Speaker of the Fijian House of representatives (2001–2006) and Minister for Foreign Affairs (2007), Interim appointee of the Bainimarama led Military Government for current President of Fiji. President of Fiji since 2009.
- Naupoto, Viliame - Interim Permanent Secretary for Fisheries and Forests. Acting Commander of the Royal Fiji Military Forces.
- Osbourne, Patrick - Otago Highlanders winger
- Qarase, Laisenia - Prime Minister of Fiji, 2000–2006, ousted by military
- Rabuka, Sitiveni - instigator of the coups of 1987, former Commander of Fiji Military, former Prime Minister of Fiji
- Ratuvili, Usaia - Chief Magistrate of Fiji
- Savu, Akuila - Chief Executive Officer and managing director of Air Pacific, Executive Chairman of Ports Authority of Fiji and Deputy Chairman of Yatu Lau Company.
- Senilagakali, Dr Jona - interim Prime Minister in 2006 military government
- Siwatibau, Svenaca - former Governor Reserve Bank of Fiji, Director of ESCAP, Fijian academic leader and civil service administrator
- Speight, Henry - Brumbies and Wallaby winger
- Taga, Mosese - Fiji Rugby prop and Captain
- Tora, Apisai - Former Senator, Cabinet Minister, Leader of the Taukei movement and Trade Union leader
- Tusiawau, George - Chief and Member of the Legislative Council
- Vatuvoka, Waisale - former Naitasiri and Fiji International Centre
- Vidiri, Joeli - former Fiji and All Blacks player, Bau House
- Vitusagavulu, Jesoni, Fijian Ambassador to the US & Canada
- Vocea, Peceli - Fiji's Ambassador to the European Union, Former PS Finance, Bau House Captain 1985
- Vuli, Naibuka - Fiji Rugby Captain
- Meli Derenalagi - Fiji Sevens player
- Waqabaca Kotobalavu - Former Fiji sevens player
- Tevita Ikanivere - Current Drua Super Rugby Team Captain
- Sevuloni Reece - New Zealand and Crusaders Rugby player
- Emoni Narawa - New Zealand and Waikato Chiefs rugby player
