= Nabua, Fiji =

Coordinates: 18°07′S 178°27.5′E

Nabua (Fijian pronunciation: [nambua]) is a suburb of the Fijian capital of Suva. The Queen Elizabeth Barracks, a major military base which saw a mutiny on 2 November 2000, is located there.

Nabua was established in 1935 by the late Ratu Sir Josefa Vanayaliyali Sukuna after the great Tsunami heat in Suva. It was mainly populated by indigenous Fijians.

== See also ==
- Nabua, Camarines Sur
