= Waisea Luveniyali =

- Born: Waisea Sedre Luveniyali; 23 July 1985 (age 41) Suva, Fiji
- Height: 1.78 m (5 ft 10 in)
- Weight: 88 kg (13 st 12 lb)
- School: Queen Victoria School (Fiji)

Rugby union career
- Position(s): Fly-half, Centre
Senior career
Years	Team	Apps	(Points)
2003-2004	Queen Victoria		
2007	Western Crusaders	5	(27)
2007	Fiji Warriors	3	(0)
2008-2010	Harlequins	13	(39)
International career
Years	Team	Apps	(Points)
2007-2013	Fiji	16	(9)

Waisea Sedre Luveniyali (born Suva, 23 July 1985) is a Fijian rugby union footballer. He hails from the village of Kasavu in the province of Naitasiri, and his mother is from the village of Qarani, Gau in the Lomaiviti group.

== Career ==
He plays as a fly-half, formerly for Fiji Warriors.

Luveniyali was a late call up to the Fijian team in 2007 after playing for Fiji in the Under 21 World Cup. The young fly half was put right into the starting lineup to debut against Australia A, where they drew the game 14 – 14. After this performance, he was selected for the Fiji for the 2007 Rugby World Cup finals. He played against Australia (12–55). He had 2 caps, with a conversion and a penalty scored by the end of the tournament.

He was the first choice fly-half for Fiji in the 2008 IRB Pacific Nations Cup and played in the 2009 IRB Pacific Nations Cup.

=== Harlequins ===
On 29 July 2008, Harlequins confirmed that he had arrived in London to join up with his new team and had started training.
