= Toma Toke =

- Born: June 20, 1985 (age 41) Ha'ateiho, Tonga
- Height: 5 ft 11 in (1.80 m)
- Weight: 238 lb (108 kg)

Rugby union career
- Position: Prop
Senior career
Years	Team	Apps	(Points)
2010-2011	Pays Du Medoc	18	(0)
2011-2017	Mâcon	80	(25)
International career
Years	Team	Apps	(Points)
2007-2010	Tonga	12	(5)

Toma Toke (born Ha'ateiho, 20 June 1985) is a Tongan rugby union footballer. He plays as a prop. His current team is Doncaster Knights.

He was selected for the Tongan squad that entered the 2007 Rugby World Cup finals, playing three matches. He was later chosen for the Tonga autumn European tour. He has currently 12 caps for his national team, with 1 try scored, 5 points on aggregate.
