= Sunia Koto =

Fijian rugby union player (born 1980)

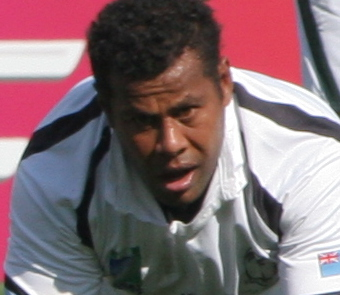
- Born: Sunia Koto Vuli; 15 April 1980 (age 46) Suva, Fiji
- Height: 1.74 m (5 ft 9 in)
- Weight: 113 kg (17 st 11 lb; 249 lb)
- School: Marist Brothers High School

Rugby union career
- Position: Hooker
Senior career
Years	Team	Apps	(Points)
2007	Highlanders		
2007	Fiji Warriors		
2007-09	London Welsh		
2009-16	Narbonne	155	(30)
2016-	AS Mâcon		
- Correct as of 24 August 2015
International career
Years	Team	Apps	(Points)
2005–	Fiji	58	(10)
2008	Pacific Islanders	2	(0)
- Correct as of 22 November 2017

Sunia Koto Vuli (born 15 April 1980 in Suva) is a Fijian rugby union player. He plays as a hooker.

He played for the Fijian teams Highlanders, and Fiji Warriors, London Welsh in England, and currently Narbonne.

He played his first game for Fiji, on 3 June 2005, against New Zealand Māori. He was a member of his country's squad at the 2007 Rugby World Cup finals, playing in four games.

Koto had 18 caps for his side by the end of the competition.
