= Ilaisa Maʻasi =

Aloisio Ma'asi
- Born: Aloisio Ilaisa Ma'asi; 5 February 1982 (age 44) Tofoa, Tonga
- Height: 1.85 m (6 ft 1 in)
- Weight: 96 kg (15 st 2 lb)

Rugby union career
- Position: Hooker
Provincial / State sides
Years	Team	Apps	(Points)
2007–2011	Counties Manukau	8	(5)
International career
Years	Team	Apps	(Points)
2009–	Tonga	13	(5)
- Correct as of 10 November 2012

Aloisio Ilaisa Ma'asi (born 5 February 1982 in Tofoa, Tonga) is a Tongan rugby union player. He plays Hooker for Tonga on international level. Ma'asi also played for Counties Manukau in their ITM Cup campaign from 2007 to 2010.

Ma'asi made his debut for the national side against Fiji in June 2009 crossing the line two Tests later against Japan. He found his way back into the international side for their 2011 Churchill Cup campaign before turning out for the national side in the Pacific Nations Cup. He also was a part of the squad in the 2011 Rugby World Cup making two appearances.

In June 2014 he was named to the Pacific barbarians team to play against Tonga.
