= Tom Donnelly (rugby union) =

New Zealand rugby union player and coach (born 1981)

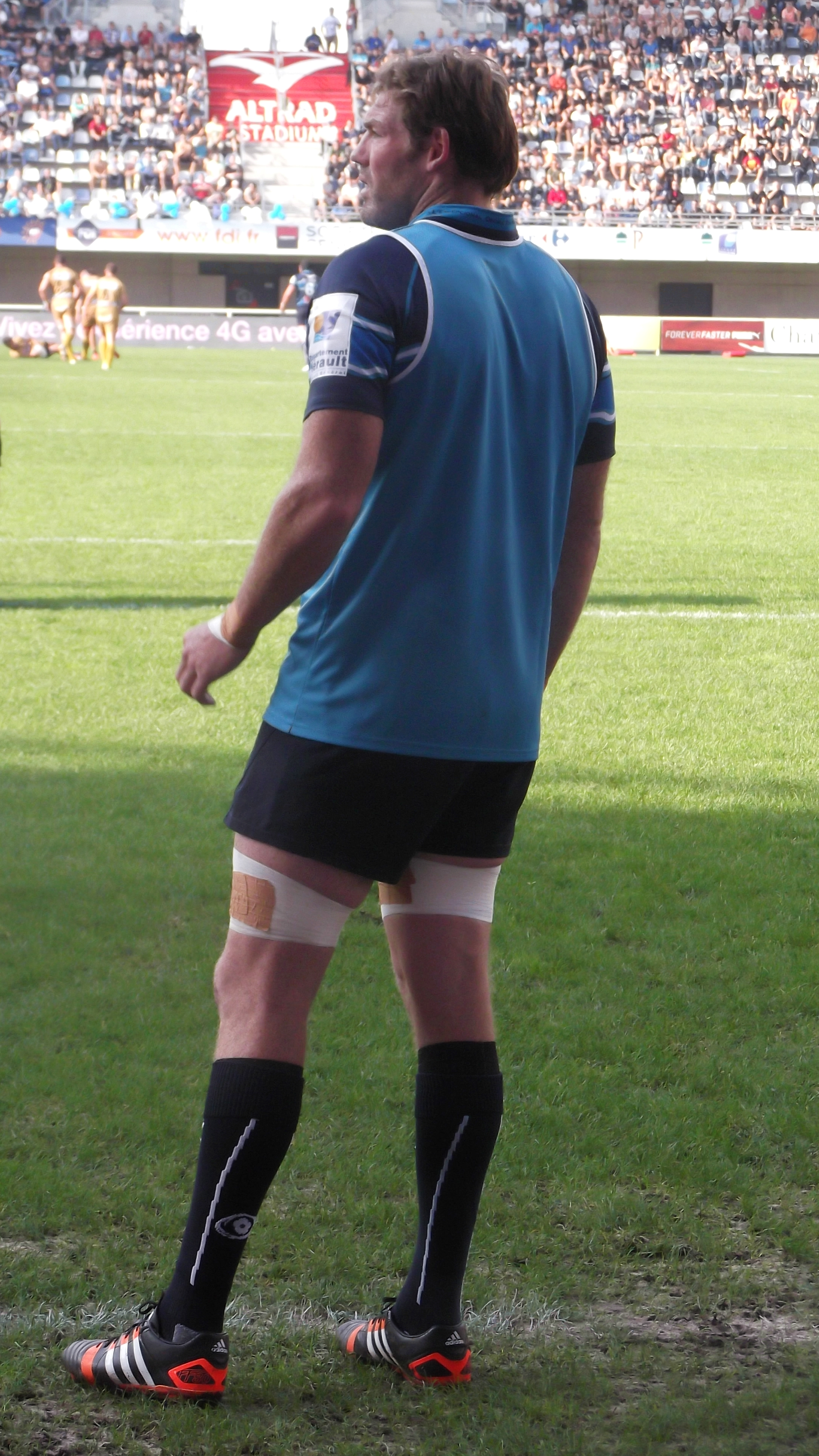
- Born: Thomas Mathew Donnelly; 1 October 1981 (age 45) Rotorua, Bay of Plenty, New Zealand
- Height: 2 m (6 ft 7 in)
- Weight: 118 kg (18 st 8 lb; 260 lb)
- School: Rotorua Boys' High School

Rugby union career
- Position: Lock
Senior career
Years	Team	Apps	(Points)
2014-16	Montpellier	25	(0)
2016-17	Aviron Bayonnais	14	(0)
Provincial / State sides
Years	Team	Apps	(Points)
2002–13	Otago	82	(25)
Super Rugby
Years	Team	Apps	(Points)
2004–11	Highlanders	65	(15)
2012–13	Crusaders	19	(0)
2014	Blues	14	(5)
- Correct as of 13 July 2014
International career
Years	Team	Apps	(Points)
2009–2010	New Zealand	15	(0)

Thomas Mathew Donnelly (born 1 October 1981) is a former rugby union player who played for Montpellier in the Top 14. He also made 15 appearances for the All Blacks since 2009 and played for Otago Rugby Football Union. He moved into a coaching career at Otago from 2017.

== Playing career ==
=== Provincial rugby ===
Born in Rotorua, Donnelly moved south in 2000 to attend the University of Otago, and made his debut for Otago in 2002. He quickly established himself as a fixture at lock for the province, and by 2005 was one of the standout players in the provincial championship, forming a dynamic partnership with James Ryan.

Although injuries and international duty have limited his availability for Otago, he remained a fixture in the squad, captaining the team for a stretch in 2007 in place of an injured Craig Newby. In 2008, he played his 50th match for the province.

Due to a shoulder injury and his time with the All Blacks, Donnelly made only a single appearance for Otago in the 2010 ITM Cup. However, in the 2011 ITM Cup he appeared in every game, serving as team captain for the majority of the season following an injury to Eben Joubert.

=== Super Rugby ===
Donnelly earned a place on the Highlanders for the first time for the 2004 Super 12 season, but was limited to only two appearances. However, he emerged as a full-time starter through the 2005 and 2006 seasons, starting 20 out of 24 games over that period.

After losing most of the 2007 Super 14 season to injury, he returned in 2008 in top form, marking himself as a future All Black. A strong 2009 would eventually see that promise fulfilled, as he cracked the national side for the first time at the conclusion of the year.

Donnelly started the first 5 games of the 2010 Super 14 season before being ruled out for the rest of the campaign with a serious ankle injury. Back healthy in 2011, he found himself in an unfamiliar position coming off the bench as the strong play of Josh Bekhuis and Jarrad Hoeata kept him out of the starting line-up.

After a disappointing season in 2011, Donnelly transferred to the Crusaders for the 2012 season.

On 17 October 2013, it was confirmed that Donnelly had moved to fellow Super Rugby team, the Blues (Super Rugby).

=== Top 14 ===
In 2014, Donnelly signed a deal to join French Top 14 side Montpellier.

=== International career ===
Donnelly was on the fringes of the All Blacks for several years, first being selected to the Junior All Blacks in 2006. He was again selected for the Junior All Blacks in 2007, and to an All Blacks wider training group in 2008.

After being selected to the Junior All Blacks again in 2009, Donnelly was called into the full squad due to an injury to Bryn Evans and made his debut against Australia in the final Tri Nations game of the season on 19 September, won 33–6 by the All Blacks in Wellington.

On the 2009 end of year tour, Donnelly featured in all 5 matches, earning positive reviews for his steady play.

In the 2010 Tri Nations tournament, Donnelly played perhaps the finest rugby of his career as one of the form players for the All Blacks, starting every match as New Zealand went undefeated in the tournament. However, his international season would end on a sour note as he injured his knee against Ireland, ruling him out of the remainder of the end of year tour.

The All Blacks have a record of 14 wins and 1 loss in games in which Donnelly has featured.

== Coaching career ==
Donnelly became an assistant coach for Otago Rugby in 2017 and from the 2020 season he succeeded Ben Herring as chief coach. His appointment was for 3 years.
