= Manoa Vosawai =

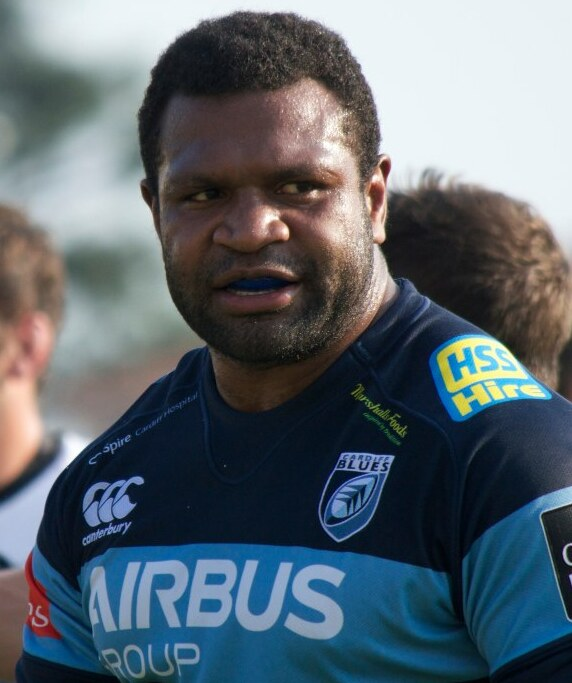
- Moanoa Vosawai playing for Cardiff Bluees against Zebre in the Pro12
- Born: Ratu Manoa Seru Vosawai; 12 August 1983 (age 43) Suva, Fiji
- Height: 1.88 m (6 ft 2 in)
- Weight: 114 kg (17 st 13 lb)

Rugby union career
- Position: Number eight
Senior career
Years	Team	Apps	(Points)
2004–2010	Parma	135	(75)
2010–2014	Treviso	68	(45)
2014–2016	Cardiff Blues	44	(25)
2016-2020	RC Vannes	73	(40)
- Correct as of 31 Jan 2016
International career
Years	Team	Apps	(Points)
2009−2011	Emerging Italy	18	(10)
2007–2014	Italy	17	(5)
- Correct as of 18 November 2014

Manoa Vosawai (born 12 August 1983 in Suva, Fiji) is an Italian rugby union player. He currently plays for the Cardiff Blues in Wales. He made his debut with the Italian national side on August 18, 2007 in a match against Japan. Vosawai plays as a number eight. Vosawai was included in the Italian squad for the 2007 World Cup, and made a substitute appearance in the Azzurri's opening match against the All Blacks, replacing Alessandro Zanni.

He joined Benetton Treviso in June 2010.

In March 2014 it was announced that Vosawai would join Cardiff Blues for the upcoming 2014/2015 season.
