= Nemia Kenatale =

Fiji international rugby union player

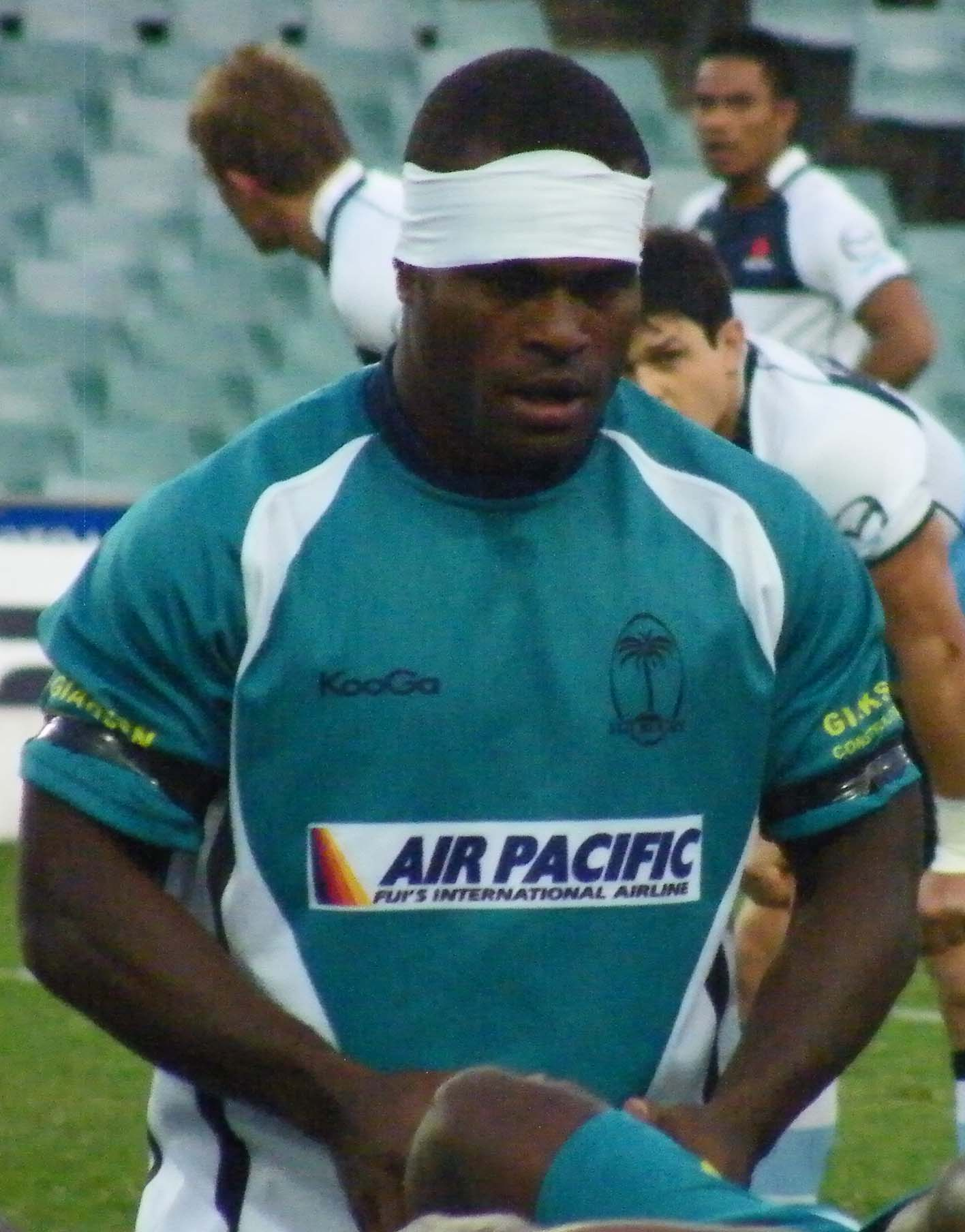
- Born: Nemia Serelevu Kenatale Ranuku; 21 January 1986 (age 40) Tavua, Fiji
- Height: 1.73 m (5 ft 8 in)
- Weight: 92 kg (203 lb)

Rugby union career
- Position: Scrum-half
Amateur team(s)
Years	Team	Apps	(Points)
- Stirling County
Senior career
Years	Team	Apps	(Points)
2013–16	Farul Constanța		
2016–17	Glasgow Warriors	3	(0)
Provincial / State sides
Years	Team	Apps	(Points)
2012–13	Southland	9	(0)
- Correct as of 23 October 2013
International career
Years	Team	Apps	(Points)
2008–	Fiji	39	(35)

Nemia Kenatale (born 21 January 1986) is a Fijian rugby union player. He plays in the scrumhalf position. He formerly played for Glasgow Warriors in the Pro12.

== Rugby Union career ==
=== Amateur career ===
While not in use for the Warriors, Kenatale played for Stirling County.

=== Professional career ===
On 31 May 2016 it was announced that Nemia had signed for Glasgow Warriors. He made his debut for the club on 30 August 2016 against Canada 'A' scoring a try, but was injured in the process. He made his Pro12 debut on 31 December 2016 for the Warriors against Benetton Treviso in Italy in a 35–28 win for the Glasgow side.

On 4 May 2017 it was announced that Kenatale would be released by the Glasgow Warriors at the end of the season.

=== International career ===
Nemia was also an understudy to Kelemedi Bola for the Knights during the Colonial Cup. He has since grown as a player and has twice represented his country; on 5 July 2008 against Tonga (Lost, 16–27) and on 22 June 2008 against Japan (Won, 24–12). In October 2010 Kenatale was selected to represent his country, for the upcoming Fiji 2010 November tour of Europe.
