= Marist Brothers High School, Fiji =

Coordinates: 18.1466°S 178.4352°E

Marist Brothers High School
- Carew Street, off Bau Street Flagstaff, Suva; Fiji

Information
- Type: Private Catholic Non-profit All-boys Secondary education institution
- Motto: In Hoc Signo Vinces (Latin)
- Religious affiliations: Roman Catholic (Marist Brothers)
- Established: 1946; 80 years ago
- Founder: Petits Frères de Marie (Order of Marist Brothers)
- Principal: Asish Dayal(Mr)
- Enrolment: 900+
- Colour: Navy Blue White Red

Marist Brothers High School is a Roman Catholic all-boys' high school situated in Suva, the capital of Fiji. It is a school in the Marist tradition, founded in 1946 by the order of Marist Brothers, which has had a presence in Fiji since 1844. The counterpart school for girls is St Joseph's Secondary School, Fiji . The school motto is In Hoc Signo Vinces.

== History ==
Marist Brothers High School was founded and has been run by members of the Marist Brothers order since it opened to students in 1949. Founded by Saint Marcellin Champagnat, a Marist priest in France in 1816, the order went by the names of the Petits Frères de Marie (Little Brothers of Mary) and Fratres Maristae a Scolis (FMS or the Marist Brothers of the Schools, the post-nominal letters of the Marist Brothers). Marcellin's desire to have brothers to teach the rural children grew after his visit to the bedside of a sixteen-year-old, Jean Baptiste Montagne whom St. Marcellin discovered knew nothing of his faith.

Marist Brothers schools began in Australia in 1872 and in New Zealand in 1876. On 27 August 1888, three Marist brothers, Harvey, Vincent and Alphonsus, arrived in Suva to begin a school for the children of Catholic Europeans. This was in response to Bishop Vidal's request to Brother Theophane, the Brother Superior General in France. On 7 September 1888, they began their school in a house, just above the Lilac Theatre in Waimanu Road. In 1889 they moved to Suva Street. At first only European boys were admitted but by 1897 Brothers Columba and Claudius had begun a school for Indian boys and other races, known as the Indian School or the Cosmopolitan School, on the corner of Suva Street and Toorak Road. By 1936 this had developed into St Columba's School.

In 1912, Brothers Augustine, Alphonsus and Loyola began secondary classes in St Felix College, also on the Suva Street property. In 1936, after a considerable struggle with the civil authorities, who opposed secondary education for locally born children, the Brothers were allowed to reopen their secondary classes to all races. Thus the Marist Brothers High School had its beginnings in Suva Street. The High School was built at Bau Street during 1948, ready to begin the year there in 1949.

== Extra-curricular activities ==
=== Marist sports ===
For the past four decades Marist Brothers High School has dominated athletics in Fiji. Athletics is a unifying force for the Marist community who come together every year to assist athletes for the annual Coca-Cola Games and later on in international meets. It is the only school in Fiji that won National Secondary Schools big three sports, Soccer, Rugby and Athletics, titles in same year in 1976.
