= 2011 June rugby union tests =

The 2011 mid-year rugby union tests featured only seven matches due to the upcoming 2011 Rugby World Cup. No test series took place, although the Barbarians did play two matches in the United Kingdom, against England and Wales. New Zealand and Australia hosted a respective Tier 2 side, Australia hosted Samoa, New Zealand hosted Fiji. Argentina hosted the French Barbarians, while Japan played a Top League XV side in Tokyo.

This was the first time since 1973, and only the second in the past 50 years, that no team representing the Home Unions (England, Ireland, Scotland, Wales, or the British and Irish Lions) toured the southern hemisphere in the mid-year window.

== Fixtures ==
=== Week 1 ===
29 May 2011
14:30 BST (UTC+01)

| England | 32–38 | Barbarians |
| Try: Trinder 3' c Monye 18' c Simpson-Daniel 26' c Johnson 72' m Con: C. Hodgson (3); Pen: C. Hodgson (2) 16', 63' | Report | Try: Baby 7' c Michalak 38' c Visser (2) 48' m, 78' c Smith 56' m van Niekerk 60' c Con: Michalak (3); Pienaar |

Twickenham Stadium, London
Attendance: 38,680
Referee: Christophe Berdos (France)

| FB | 15 | Mike Brown | | (substituted off) 66' |
| RW | 14 | James Simpson-Daniel |
| OC | 13 | Henry Trinder |
| IC | 12 | Matt Banahan |
| LW | 11 | Ugo Monye | | (substituted off) 43' |
| FH | 10 | Charlie Hodgson |
| SH | 9 | Paul Hodgson | | (substituted off) 58' |
| N8 | 8 | Luke Narraway (c) |
| OF | 7 | Carl Fearns | (yellow card) 35' | (substituted off) 52' |
| BF | 6 | Tom Johnson |
| RL | 5 | Dave Attwood |
| LL | 4 | Graham Kitchener | | (substituted off) 58' |
| LP | 3 | Paul Doran-Jones | | (substituted off) 58' | (substituted in) 62' |
| HK | 2 | David Paice |
| TP | 1 | Joe Marler | | | (substituted off) 62' |
Substitutes:
| HK | 16 | Joe Gray |
| PR | 17 | Kieran Brookes | | (substituted in) 58' |
| LK | 18 | James Gaskell | | (substituted in) 52' |
| FL | 19 | Jamie Gibson | | (substituted in) 58' |
| SH | 20 | Micky Young | | (substituted in) 58' |
| FH | 21 | Stephen Myler | | (substituted in) 66' |
| CE | 22 | Jordan Turner-Hall | | (substituted in) 43' |
Team manager:
(England) Martin Johnson

| FB | 15 | (France) Nicolas Jeanjean |
| RW | 14 | (England) Paul Sackey | (substituted off) 65' |
| OC | 13 | (France) Benoît Baby | (substituted off) 50' |
| IC | 12 | (France) Mathieu Bastareaud |
| LW | 11 | (Netherlands) Tim Visser |
| FH | 10 | (France) Frédéric Michalak | (substituted off) 57' |
| SH | 9 | (South Africa) Ruan Pienaar |
| N8 | 8 | (Italy) Sergio Parisse (c) |
| OF | 7 | (Australia) George Smith | (substituted off) 65' |
| BF | 6 | (South Africa) Joe van Niekerk |
| RL | 5 | (Italy) Quintin Geldenhuys | (substituted off) 50' |
| LL | 4 | (Norway) Erik Lund |
| LP | 3 | (Georgia (country)) Davit Kubriashvili | (substituted off) 50' |
| HK | 2 | (Italy) Leonardo Ghiraldini | (substituted off) 50' |
| TP | 1 | (Italy) Salvatore Perugini |
Substitutes:
| HK | 16 | (France) Sébastien Bruno | (substituted in) 50' |
| PR | 17 | (New Zealand) Carl Hayman | (substituted in) 50' |
| LK | 18 | (Samoa) Iosefa Tekori | (substituted in) 50' |
| FL | 19 | (Wales) Martyn Williams | (substituted in) 65' |
| SH | 20 | (France) Sébastien Tillous-Borde | (substituted in) 57' |
| FH | 21 | (Australia) Willie Mason | (substituted in) 65' |
| CE | 22 | (Fiji) Seru Rabeni | (substituted in) 50' |
Coach:
(Wales) Dai Young

- As is typical for Barbarians matches, this was an uncapped match for England.
- The traditionally uncapped player of the Barbarians side was Tim Visser. (Willie Mason was also uncapped in rugby union but he was capped in rugby league, having switched codes a few weeks before the game when signing to Toulon.) Visser qualified for Scotland on residency grounds in June 2012 and now represents that country internationally.

=== Week 2 ===
4 June 2011
14:30 BST (UTC+01)

| Wales | 28–31 | Barbarians |
| Try: North 10' c Stoddart 25' c Phillips 54' c Brew 65' c Con: S. Jones (4) | Report | Try: Tekori 17' m Nacewa (2) 22' c, 79' c Parisse 35' c Bastareaud 73' m Con: James (3) |

Millennium Stadium, Cardiff
Attendance: 31,232
Referee: Alain Rolland (Ireland)

| FB | 15 | Morgan Stoddart |
| RW | 14 | George North |
| OC | 13 | Jonathan Davies |
| IC | 12 | Gavin Henson | | (substituted off) 61' |
| LW | 11 | Aled Brew | (yellow card) 43' |
| FH | 10 | Stephen Jones | | (substituted off) 66' |
| SH | 9 | Mike Phillips | | (substituted off) 61' |
| N8 | 8 | Taulupe Faletau |
| OF | 7 | Sam Warburton (c) |
| BF | 6 | Dan Lydiate | | (substituted off) 63' |
| RL | 5 | Luke Charteris |
| LL | 4 | Ryan Jones | | (substituted off) 61' |
| LP | 3 | Paul James |
| HK | 2 | Huw Bennett | | (substituted off) 64' |
| TP | 1 | Ryan Bevington | | (substituted off) 61' |
Substitutes:
| HK | 16 | Lloyd Burns | | (substituted in) 64' |
| PR | 17 | Scott Andrews | | (substituted in) 61' |
| LK | 18 | Alun Wyn Jones | | (substituted in) 61' |
| FL | 19 | Josh Turnbull | | (substituted in) 63' |
| SH | 20 | Tavis Knoyle | | (substituted in) 61' |
| FH | 21 | Rhys Priestland | | (substituted in) 66' |
| CE | 22 | Scott Williams | | (substituted in) 61' |
Coach:
(New Zealand) Warren Gatland

| FB | 15 | (Fiji) Isa Nacewa |
| RW | 14 | (England) Paul Sackey | | (substituted off) 61' |
| OC | 13 | (Fiji) Seru Rabeni | | (substituted off) 65' |
| IC | 12 | (France) Mathieu Bastareaud |
| LW | 11 | (New Zealand) Doug Howlett |
| FH | 10 | (Australia) Brock James |
| SH | 9 | (France) Sébastien Tillous-Borde | | (substituted off) 64' |
| N8 | 8 | (Italy) Sergio Parisse (c) |
| OF | 7 | (Wales) Martyn Williams | | (substituted off) 55' |
| BF | 6 | (South Africa) Joe van Niekerk |
| RL | 5 | (New Zealand) Paul Tito | | (substituted off) 56' |
| LL | 4 | (Samoa) Iosefa Tekori | (yellow card) 45' |
| LP | 3 | (New Zealand) Carl Hayman | | (substituted off) 65' | (substituted in) 74' |
| HK | 2 | (France) Sébastien Bruno | | (substituted off) 54' |
| TP | 1 | (Wales) Iestyn Thomas | | | (substituted off) 74' |
Substitutes:
| HK | 16 | (Italy) Leonardo Ghiraldini | | (substituted in) 54' |
| PR | 17 | (Georgia (country)) Davit Kubriashvili | | (substituted in) 65' |
| LK | 18 | (Norway) Erik Lund | | (substituted in) 56' |
| FL | 19 | (Australia) George Smith | | (substituted in) 55' |
| SH | 20 | (Wales) Lloyd Williams | | (substituted in) 64' |
| FH | 21 | (Australia) Willie Mason | | (substituted in) 65' |
| CE | 22 | (France) Benoît Baby | | (substituted in) 61' |
Coach:
(Wales) Dai Young

Notes:

- Unlike most Barbarians matches, this was a fully capped match for Wales. As a result, Stephen Jones earned his 100th Wales cap in this match.
- The uncapped players on this Barbarians squad were Brock James and Lloyd Williams. As noted earlier, Willie Mason is uncapped in union as a recent code convert, but capped in league.

4 June 2011
16:10 ART (UTC-03)

| Argentina | 23–19 | French Barbarians |
| Try: Fessia 23' c Figuerola 38' m Contepomi 62' m Con: Contepomi; Pen: Contepomi (2) 58', 74' | Report | Try: Boussès 12' c Planté 29' m Vosloo 66' c Con: Beauxis (2) |

Doble Visera, Avellaneda
Referee: Francisco Pastrana (Argentina)

| FB | 15 | Martín Rodríguez |
| RW | 14 | Lucas Borges |
| OC | 13 | Marcelo Bosch |
| IC | 12 | Horacio San Martín |
| LW | 11 | Gonzalo Camacho |
| FH | 10 | Felipe Contepomi (c) |
| SH | 9 | Agustín Figuerola | (substituted off) 12' |
| N8 | 8 | Leonardo Senatore |
| OF | 7 | Juan Manuel Leguizamón |
| BF | 6 | Genaro Fessia | (substituted off) 11' |
| RL | 5 | Mariano Galarza | (substituted off) 75' |
| LL | 4 | Manuel Carizza |
| LP | 3 | Maximiliano Bustos | (substituted off) 11' |
| HK | 2 | Agustín Creevy |
| TP | 1 | Rodrigo Roncero | (substituted off) 22' |
Substitutes:
| HK | 16 | Eusebio Guiñazú | (substituted in) 22' |
| PR | 17 | Juan Pablo Orlandi | (substituted in) 11' |
| LK | 18 | Santiago Guzmán | (substituted in) 75' |
| FL | 19 | Alejandro Campos | (substituted in) 11' |
| SH | 20 | Alfredo Lalanne | (substituted in) 12' |
| FH | 21 | Nicolás Sánchez |
| WG | 22 | Rafael Carballo |
Coach:
(Argentina) Santiago Phelan

| FB | 15 | Silvère Tian | (substituted off) 70' |
| RW | 14 | Adrien Planté | (substituted off) 57' |
| OC | 13 | Romain Cabannes |
| IC | 12 | Guillaume Boussès |
| LW | 11 | Marc Andreu |
| FH | 10 | Lionel Beauxis |
| SH | 9 | Julien Dupuy | (substituted off) 61' |
| N8 | 8 | Damien Chouly |
| OF | 7 | Pierre Rabadan (c) |
| BF | 6 | Gerhard Vosloo |
| RL | 5 | Matthias Rolland |
| LL | 4 | Christophe Samson |
| LP | 3 | David Attoub |
| HK | 2 | Mathieu Bonello | (substituted off) 57' |
| TP | 1 | Yannick Forestier |
Substitutes:
| HK | 16 | Romain Terrain |
| PR | 17 | Eduard Coetzee | (substituted in) 57' |
| LK | 18 | Guillaume Vilaceca |
| FL | 19 | Antonie Claassen |
| SH | 20 | Fabien Cibray | (substituted in) 61' |
| FH | 21 | Rémi Talès | (substituted in) 70' |
| CE | 22 | Yoan Audrin | (substituted in) 57' |
Coaches:
(France) Laurent Travers (France) Laurent Labit

=== Week 3 ===
11 June 2011
15:25 ART (UTC-03)

| Argentina | 18–21 | French Barbarians |
| Pen: Sánchez 17', 29', 31', 38', 44', 55' | Report | Try: Lapeyre (2) 26' c, 49'm Con: Teulet; Pen: Teulet (3) 3', 42', 56' |

Estadio Centenario, Resistencia
Referee: Pro Legoete (South Africa)

| FB | 15 | Lucas González Amorosino |
| RW | 14 | Agustin Gosio |
| OC | 13 | Juan Ignacio Gauthier | (substituted off) 63' |
| IC | 12 | Gabriel Ascarate |
| LW | 11 | Rafael Carballo |
| FH | 10 | Nicolás Sánchez | (substituted off) 70' |
| SH | 9 | Alfredo Lalanne | (substituted off) 40' |
| N8 | 8 | Leonardo Senatore |
| OF | 7 | Julio Farías Cabello |
| BF | 6 | Miguel de Achaval | (substituted off) 74' |
| RL | 5 | Benjamin Macome | (substituted off) 56' |
| LL | 4 | Manuel Carizza |
| LP | 3 | Martín Scelzo | (substituted off) 40' |
| HK | 2 | Agustín Creevy (c) |
| TP | 1 | Juan Figallo | (substituted off) 66' |
Substitutes:
| PR | 16 | Eusebio Guiñazú | (substituted in) 66' |
| PR | 17 | Juan Pablo Orlandi | (substituted in) 40' |
| PR | 18 | Bruno Postiglioni |
| LK | 19 | Alejandro Campos | (substituted in) 56' |
| FL | 20 | Genaro Fessia | (substituted in) 74' |
| SH | 21 | Nicolas Bruzzone | (substituted in) 40' |
| FH | 22 | Marcelo Bosch | (substituted in) 70' |
| CE | 23 | Gonzalo Camacho | (substituted in) 63' |
Coach:
(Argentina) Santiago Phelan

| FB | 15 | Romain Teulet |
| RW | 14 | Julien Arias |
| OC | 13 | Yohan Audrin | (substituted off) 70' |
| IC | 12 | Guillaume Boussès |
| LW | 11 | Benjamin Lapeyre |
| FH | 10 | Rémi Talès | (substituted off) 69' |
| SH | 9 | Fabien Cibray | (substituted off) 56' |
| N8 | 8 | Antonie Claassen |
| OF | 7 | Pierre Rabadan (c) | (substituted off) 54' |
| BF | 6 | Jean Monribot |
| RL | 5 | Guillaume Vilaceca |
| LL | 4 | Matthias Rolland |
| LP | 3 | David Attoub | (substituted off) 69' |
| HK | 2 | Romain Terrain | (substituted off) 54' |
| TP | 1 | Jean-Philippe Lafond | (substituted off) 40' |
Substitutes:
| HK | 16 | Mathieu Bonello | (substituted in) 54' |
| PR | 17 | Eduard Coetzee | (substituted in) 40' |
| PR | 18 | Yannick Forestier | (substituted in) 69' |
| FL | 19 | Christophe Samson |
| FL | 20 | Gerhard Vosloo | (substituted in) 54' |
| SH | 21 | Julien Dupuy | (substituted in) 56' |
| FH | 22 | Lionel Beauxis | (substituted in) 69' |
| CE | 23 | Romain Cabannes | (substituted in) 70' |
Coaches:
(France) Laurent Travers (France) Laurent Labit

=== Week 4 ===
26 June 2011
15:00 JST (UTC+09)

| Japan | 49–7 | (Japan) Top League XV |
| Try: Kikutani 10' c, 33' c, 64' c Webb 18' c Holani 26' c Nicholas 44' c Imamura 58' c Con: Nicholas (4); Webb; Williams (2) | | Try: Nagatomo 72' c Con: Kimishima |

Chichibunomiya Rugby Stadium, Tokyo
Referee: Shinji Aida (Japan)

=== Week 5 ===
17 July 2011
14:00 AEST (UTC+10)

| Australia | 23–32 | Samoa |
| Try: Ioane 37' c Giteau 70' c Con: Giteau (2); Pen: Giteau (3) 40', 41', 57' | Report | Try: Tuilagi 11' c Williams 28' c Thompson 45' m G. Pisi 54' c Con: T. Pisi (3); Pen: T. Pisi |

ANZ Stadium, Sydney
Attendance: 29,808
Referee: Marius Jonker (South Africa)

| FB | 15 | Mark Gerrard | (substituted off) 55' |
| RW | 14 | Rod Davies |
| OC | 13 | Adam Ashley-Cooper |
| IC | 12 | Pat McCabe |
| LW | 11 | Digby Ioane |
| FH | 10 | Matt Giteau |
| SH | 9 | Nick Phipps | (substituted off) 56' |
| N8 | 8 | Ben McCalman | (substituted off) 59' |
| OF | 7 | Matt Hodgson | (substituted off) 50' |
| BF | 6 | Rocky Elsom (c) |
| RL | 5 | Nathan Sharpe | (substituted off) 51' |
| LL | 4 | Sitaleki Timani |
| LP | 3 | Ben Alexander |
| HK | 2 | Stephen Moore |
| TP | 1 | Sekope Kepu |
Substitutes:
| HK | 16 | James Hanson |
| PR | 17 | Pekahou Cowan |
| LK | 18 | Dan Vickerman | (substituted in) 51' |
| N8 | 19 | Scott Higginbotham | (substituted in) 59' |
| FL | 20 | Beau Robinson | (substituted in) 50' |
| SH | 21 | Will Genia | (substituted in) 56' |
| FB | 22 | Kurtley Beale | (substituted in) 55' |
Coach:
(New Zealand) Robbie Deans

| FB | 15 | Paul Williams |
| RW | 14 | Sailosi Tagicakibau |
| OC | 13 | George Pisi | | (substituted off) 58' |
| IC | 12 | Seilala Mapusua |
| LW | 11 | Alesana Tuilagi |
| FH | 10 | Tusi Pisi | | (substituted off) 72' |
| SH | 9 | Kahn Fotuali'i |
| N8 | 8 | George Stowers |
| OF | 7 | Maurie Fa'asavalu |
| BF | 6 | Taiasina Tuifu'a | | (substituted off) 76' |
| RL | 5 | Daniel Leo | (yellow card) 36' |
| LL | 4 | Kane Thompson | | (substituted off) 69' |
| LP | 3 | Anthony Perenise |
| HK | 2 | Mahonri Schwalger (c) | | (substituted off) 77' |
| TP | 1 | Zak Taulafo | | (substituted off) 65' |
Substitutes:
| HK | 16 | Ti'i Paulo | | (substituted in) 77' |
| PR | 17 | Census Johnston | | (substituted in) 65' |
| LK | 18 | Filipo Levi | | (substituted in) 69' |
| FL | 19 | Manu Salavea | | (substituted in) 76' |
| FH | 20 | Brenton Helleur | | (substituted in) 72' |
| CE | 21 | Eliota Fuimaono-Sapolu | | (substituted in) 58' |
| FB | 22 | James So'oialo |
Coach:
(Samoa) Fuimaono Tafua

=== Week 6 ===
22 July 2011
19:35 NZST (UTC+12)

| New Zealand | 60–14 | Fiji |
| Try: Sivivatu 9' m Slade 23' c Hore 34' c Thomson 38' c Smith 63' c Weepu 68' c Penalty try 76' c Muliaina 79' c Con: Slade (4); Carter (3); Pen: Slade (2) 3', 20' | Report | Try: Serelevu 52' c Goneva 70' c Con: Bai (2) |

Carisbrook, Dunedin
Attendance: 15,000
Referee: Stuart Dickinson (Australia)

| FB | 15 | Mils Muliaina |
| RW | 14 | Zac Guildford |
| OC | 13 | Conrad Smith |
| IC | 12 | Ma'a Nonu |
| LW | 11 | Sitiveni Sivivatu | (substituted off) 50' |
| FH | 10 | Colin Slade | (substituted off) 64' |
| SH | 9 | Jimmy Cowan | (substituted off) 53' |
| N8 | 8 | Liam Messam | (substituted off) 65' |
| OF | 7 | Richie McCaw (c) |
| BF | 6 | Adam Thomson |
| RL | 5 | Ali Williams |
| LL | 4 | Jarrad Hoeata | (substituted off) 53' |
| TP | 3 | Ben Franks |
| HK | 2 | Andrew Hore | (substituted off) 66' |
| LP | 1 | Wyatt Crockett | (substituted off) 66' |
Replacements:
| HK | 16 | Corey Flynn | (substituted in) 66' |
| PR | 17 | John Afoa | (substituted in) 66' |
| LK | 18 | Sam Whitelock | (substituted in) 53' |
| N8 | 19 | Jerome Kaino | (substituted in) 65' |
| SH | 20 | Piri Weepu | (substituted in) 52' |
| FH | 21 | Daniel Carter | (substituted in) 64' |
| FB | 22 | Ben Smith | (substituted in) 50' |
Coach:
(New Zealand) Graham Henry

| FB | 15 | Iliesa Keresoni |
| RW | 14 | Timoci Nagusa | (substituted off) 55' |
| OC | 13 | Albert Vulivuli |
| IC | 12 | Ravai Fatiaki |
| LW | 11 | Napolioni Nalaga | (substituted off) 78' |
| FH | 10 | Seremaia Bai |
| SH | 9 | Nemia Serelevu | (substituted off) 64' |
| N8 | 8 | Sakiusa Matadigo |
| OF | 7 | Akapusi Qera | (substituted off) 60' |
| BF | 6 | Dominiko Waqaniburotu |
| RL | 5 | Rupeni Nasiga | (substituted off) 69' |
| LL | 4 | Sekonaia Kalou |
| TP | 3 | Deacon Manu (c) |
| HK | 2 | Sunia Koto | (substituted off) 78' |
| LP | 1 | Campese Ma'afu | (substituted off) 69' |
Replacements:
| HK | 16 | Viliame Veikoso | (substituted in) 78' |
| PR | 17 | Setefano Somoca | (substituted in) 69' |
| LK | 18 | Josefa Domolailai | (substituted in) 69' |
| N8 | 19 | Malakai Ravulo | (substituted in) 60' |
| SH | 20 | Vitori Butava | (substituted in) 64' |
| FH | 21 | Taniela Rawaqa | (substituted in) 78' |
| FB | 22 | Vereniki Goneva | (substituted in) 55' |
Coach:
(Fiji) Sam Domoni

Touch judges:
Steve Walsh (Australia)
James Leckie (Australia)
Television match official:
George Ayoub (Australia)

== See also ==
- Mid-year rugby union test series
- 2011 Rugby World Cup warm-up tests
- 2011 end-of-year rugby union tests
- 2011 Asian Five Nations
- 2011 IRB Churchill Cup
- 2011 IRB Pacific Nations Cup
- 2011 IRB Nations Cup
