= 2011 IRB Pacific Nations Cup =

Rugby union tournament

Tournament details
- Countries: Fiji; Japan; Samoa; Tonga
- Tournament format(s): Round-robin
- Date: 2–13 July 2011

Tournament statistics
- Teams: 4
- Matches played: 6
- Attendance: 25,345 (4,224 per match)
- Tries scored: 36 (6 per match)
- Top point scorer(s): Kurt Morath (Tonga) (56 points)
- Top try scorer(s): Koliniasi Holani (Japan); Seko Kalou (Fiji); Alisona Taumalolo (Tonga); Alesana Tuilagi (Samoa); Naipolioni Nalaga (Fiji) (2 tries)

Final
- Champions: Japan (1st title)
- Runners-up: Tonga

The 2011 Pacific Nations Cup was a rugby union tournament held between the four national sides on the Pacific Rim: Fiji, Japan, Samoa and Tonga.

Samoa was the reigning champion after they defeated Fiji in the 2010 competition at Apia Park. The tournament began on July 2 and ended on July 13, 2011 with most of the matches hosted by Fiji. Only the match between Asian 5 Nations champion, Japan and Samoa was played at Chichibunomiya Rugby Stadium in Japan. The tournament was moved to Fiji from Japan after the devastating March, 2011 Japan Tsunami.

The tournament was a round-robin where each team plays all of the other teams once. There were four points for a win, two for a draw and none for a defeat. There were also bonus points offered with one bonus point for scoring four or more tries in a match and one bonus point for losing by 7 points or less.

Japan were crowned Champions after defeating Fiji and scoring their fourth try the last play of the final match of the tournament giving them the bonus point they needed to go with an earlier win over Tonga. Ill discipline by Fiji cost them the game and gifted the Pacific Nations Cup to Japan at the expense of Tonga. Fiji finished the match with 12 men after conceding 2 red and 3 yellow cards, an unenviable world record.

== Table ==
Pos	Team	Pld	W	D	L	PF	PA	PD	TF	TA	TB	LB	Pts
1	Japan (C)	3	2	0	1	67	74	−7	10	9	2	0	10 (Note: Head-to-head: Tonga 27–28 Japan)
2	Tonga	3	2	0	1	101	68	+33	10	7	1	1	10
3	Fiji	3	1	0	2	70	87	−17	9	11	1	0	5 (Note: Head-to-head: Samoa 18–36 Fiji)
4	Samoa	3	1	0	2	71	80	−9	7	9	1	0	5

Source: IRB
(C) Champion

== Schedule ==
=== Round 1 ===
2 July 2011
15:10 (UTC+12)

Tonga	45–21	Fiji
Try: Vahafolau 5' c Taufa 25' c Penalty try 43' c Iongi 77' c S. Taumalolo 79' m Con: K. Morath (4/5) 5', 26', 43', 77'; Pen: K. Morath (4/4) 10', 14', 31', 50'; Drop: K. Morath (0/1)	Report	Try: Kalou 59' m Ravulo 66' c Con: Little (1/2) 66'; Pen: Little (3/3) 3', 7', 37'

Churchill Park, Lautoka
Attendance: 4,075
Referee: Marius Jonker (South Africa)

FB	15	Vunga Lilo
RW	14	Viliami Helu
OC	13	Alaska Taufa
IC	12	Andrew Mailei
LW	11	Viliame Iongi
FH	10	Kurt Morath
SH	9	Samisoni Fisilau
N8	8	Sione Kalamafoni
OF	7	Samiu Vahafolau (c)	(substituted off) 26'
BF	6	Lisiate Faʻaoso	(substituted off) 78'
RL	5	Paino Hehea
LL	4	Tukulua Lokotui
TP	3	Tonga Leaʻaetoa	(substituted off) 60'
HK	2	Ephraim Taukafa	(substituted off) 64'
LP	1	Sona Taumalolo	(yellow card) 62' to 72'
Replacements:
PR	16	Semisi Telefoni	(substituted in) 60'
HK	17	Sione Vaiomoʻunga	(substituted in) 64'
FL	18	Joe Tuineau	(substituted in) 26'
LK	19	Tevita Ula	(substituted in) 78'
SH	20	Soana Havea
FH	21	Hudson Tongaʻuiha
FB	22	Mateo Malupo
Coach:
(New Zealand) Isitolo Maka

FB	15	Kini Murimurivalu	(substituted off) 45'
RW	14	Vereniki Goneva
OC	13	Albert Vulivuli
IC	12	Gabiriele Lovobalavu
LW	11	Timoci Nagusa
FH	10	Nicky Little
SH	9	Nemia Kenatale	(substituted off) 59'
N8	8	Dominiko Waqaniburotu
OF	7	Malakai Ravulo
BF	6	Josefa Domolailai	(substituted off) 47'
RL	5	Tevita Cavubati	(substituted off) 71'
LL	4	Sekonaia Kalou
TP	3	Deacon Manu (c)
HK	2	Viliame Veikoso	(substituted off) 57'
LP	1	Graham Dewes	(substituted off) 57'
Replacements:
HK	16	Talemaitoga Tuapati	(substituted in) 57'
PR	17	Penijamini Makutu	(substituted in) 57'
FL	18	Samu Bola	(substituted in) 71'
FL	19	Leone Nakarawa	(substituted in) 47'
SH	20	Vitori Buatava	(substituted in) 59'
PR	21	Waisea Luveniyali
FB	22	Adriu Delai	(substituted in) 45'
Coach:
(Fiji) Sam Domoni

Touch judges:
(Ireland) Peter Fitzgibbon
(Fiji) James Bolabiu

2 July 2011
18:10 JST (UTC+09)

Japan	15–34	Samoa
Try: Holani 20' m Usuzuki 46' c Con: Nicholas (0/1); Webb (1/1) 47'; Pen: Nicholas (0/2); Webb (1/2) 32'	Report	Try: Al. Tuilagi (2) 2' c, 14' c Salavea 34' c G. Pisi 59' c Con: J. So'oialo (4/4) 3', 15', 36', 61'; Pen: J. So'oialo (2/3) 12', 65'

Chichibunomiya Rugby Stadium, Tokyo
Attendance: 9,700
Referee: Keith Brown (New Zealand)

FB	15	Goshi Tachikawa	(substituted off) 70'
RW	14	Kosuke Endo
OC	13	Yuta Imamura
IC	12	Ryan Nicholas
LW	11	Takehisa Usuzuki	(substituted off) 69'
FH	10	Shaun Webb
SH	9	Fumiaki Tanaka	(substituted off) 70'
N8	8	Koliniasi Holani
OF	7	Tadasuke Nishihara	(substituted off) 70'
BF	6	Takashi Kikutani (c)
RL	5	Luke Thompson
LL	4	Toshizumi Kitagawa	(substituted off) 48'
TP	3	Kensuke Hatakeyama
HK	2	Yusuke Aoki	(substituted off) 76'
LP	1	Hisateru Hirashima
Replacements:
HK	16	Takeshi Kizu	(substituted in) 76'
PR	17	Naoki Kawamata
LK	18	Justin Ives	(substituted in) 48'
FL	19	Itaru Taniguchi	(substituted in) 70'
SH	20	Atsushi Hiwasa	(substituted in) 70'
FB	21	Murray Williams	(substituted in) 70'
WG	22	Hirotoki Onozawa	(substituted in) 69'
Coach:
(New Zealand) John Kirwan

FB	15	James So'oialo
RW	14	Sailosi Tagicakibau
OC	13	George Pisi
IC	12	Seilala Mapusua (c)
LW	11	Alesana Tuilagi	(substituted off) 51'
FH	10	Tusi Pisi	(substituted off) 70'
SH	9	Lualua Vailoaloa	(substituted off) 58'
N8	8	Tai Tu'ifua
OF	7	Manu Salavea	(substituted off) 49'
BF	6	Ezra Taylor
RL	5	Joe Tekori	(substituted off) 39'
LL	4	Daniel Leo
TP	3	Anthony Perenise
HK	2	Ti'i Paulo	(substituted off) 77'
LP	1	Sakaria Taulafo	(substituted off) 68'
Replacements:
HK	16	Ole Avei	(substituted in) 77'
PR	17	Logovi'i Mulipola	(substituted in) 68'
LK	18	Filipo Levi	(substituted in) 39'
FL	19	Maurie Fa'asavalu	(substituted in) 49'
SH	20	Uale Mai	(substituted in) 58'
FH	21	Tasesa Lavea	(substituted in) 70'
WG	22	Timoteo Iosua	(substituted in) 51'
Coach:
(Samoa) Titimaea Tafua

Touch judges:
TBC
TBC

=== Round 2 ===
9 July 2011
12:40 (UTC+12)

Tonga	27–28	Japan
Try: V. Maʻafu 24' c K. Morath 29' c H. Tongaʻuiha 73' c Con: K. Morath (3/3) 25', 30', 74'; Pen: K. Morath (2/2) 7', 62'	Report	Try: Holani 5' c Endo 34' c Kikutani 47' c Taira 51' c Con: Arlidge (4/4) 6', 35', 48', 52'

National Stadium, Suva
Attendance: 2,550
Referee: Peter Fitzgibbon (Ireland)

FB	15	Vunga Lilo (c)
RW	14	Viliame Helu
OC	13	Alaska Taufa
IC	12	Andrew Mailei	(substituted off) 54'
LW	11	Viliame Iongi
FH	10	Kurt Morath
SH	9	Samisoni Fisilau	(substituted off) 60'
N8	8	Sione Kalamafoni
OF	7	Viliame Maʻafu
BF	6	Lisiate Faʻaoso	(substituted off) 16' (substituted in) 25'
RL	5	Joe Tuineau
LL	4	Paino Hehea	(substituted off) 68'
TP	3	Sila Puafisi	(yellow card) 15' to 25'
HK	2	Ephraim Taukafa	(substituted off) 48'
LP	1	Sona Taumalolo
Replacements:
HK	16	Ilaisa Maʻasi	(substituted in) 48'
PR	17	Maleko Latu	(substituted in) 16' (substituted off) 25'
LK	18	Lua Lokotui	(substituted in) 68'
FL	19	Sione Vaiomoʻunga
SH	20	Soane Havea	(substituted in) 60'
CR	21	Hudson Tongaʻuiha	(substituted in) 54'
FB	22	Mateo Malupo
Coach:
(New Zealand) Isitolo Maka

FB	15	Shaun Webb
RW	14	Kosuke Endo
OC	13	Koji Taira
IC	12	Ryan Nicholas
LW	11	Hirotoki Onozawa
FH	10	James Arlidge
SH	9	Fumiaki Tanaka
N8	8	Koliniasi Holani	(substituted off) 78'
OF	7	Michael Leitch
BF	6	Takashi Kikutani (c)
RL	5	Luke Thompson	(substituted off) 63'
LL	4	Justin Ives
TP	3	Kensuke Hatakeyama
HK	2	Yusuke Aoki	(substituted off) 40'
LP	1	Hisateru Hirashima	(substituted off) 69'
Replacements:
HK	16	Shota Horie	(substituted in) 40'
PR	17	Naoki Kawamata	(substituted in) 69'
LK	18	Hitoshi Ono	(substituted in) 63'
N8	19	Itaru Taniguchi	(substituted in) 78'
SH	20	Atsushi Hiwasa
FB	21	Go Aruga
WG	22	Takehisa Usuzuki
Coach:
(New Zealand) John Kirwan

Touch judges:
(New Zealand) Keith Brown
(Fiji) James Bolabiu

9 July 2011
15:10 (UTC+12)

Samoa	18–36	Fiji
Try: Tagicakibau 22' m Iosua 74' c Con: Lavea (0/1); J. So'oialo (1/1) 74'; Pen: Lavea (1/2) 11'; J. So'oialo (1/1) 14'	Report	Try: Goneva 8' c C. Ma'afu 40' c Fatiaki 46' m T. Rawaqa 70' c Kalou 79' c Con: Little (2/3) 9', 40'; Luveniyali (2/2) 70', 79'; Pen: Little (1/2) 20'; T. Rawaqa (0/1)

National Stadium, Suva
Attendance: 4,000
Referee: Marius Jonker (South Africa)

FB	15	James So'oialo
RW	14	Sailosi Tagicakibau
OC	13	Johnny Leota	(substituted off) 71'
IC	12	Eliota Fuimaono-Sapolu
LW	11	David Lemi
FH	10	Tasesa Lavea	(substituted off) 63'
SH	9	Uale Mai	(substituted off) 40'
N8	8	Tai Tu'ifua
OF	7	Maurie Fa'asavalu
BF	6	George Stowers	(substituted off) 58'
RL	5	Daniel Leo	(substituted off) 56'
LL	4	Filipo Levi	(yellow card) 36' to 46'
TP	3	Logovi'i Mulipola
HK	2	Mahonri Schwalger (c)	(substituted off) 70'
LP	1	Simon Lemalu	(substituted off) 72'
Replacements:
HK	16	Ti'i Paulo	(substituted in) 70'
PR	17	Anthony Perenise	(substituted in) 72'
LK	18	Ezra Taylor	(substituted in) 56'
FL	19	Ofisa Treviranus	(substituted in) 58'
SH	20	Lualua Vailoaloa	(substituted in) 40'
FH	21	Tusi Pisi	(substituted in) 63'
CR	22	Timoteo Iosua	(substituted in) 71'
Coach:
(Samoa) Titimaea Tafua

FB	15	Taniela Rawaqa
RW	14	Ilikena Bolakoro	(substituted off) 75'
OC	13	Albert Vulivuli
IC	12	Ravai Fatiaki
LW	11	Vereniki Goneva
FH	10	Nicky Little	(substituted off) 66'
SH	9	Nemia Kenatale	(substituted off) 54'
N8	8	Masi Matadigo
OF	7	Malakai Ravulo	(substituted off) 56'
BF	6	Rupeni Nasiga	(substituted off) 69'
RL	5	Leone Nakarawa
LL	4	Sekonaia Kalou
TP	3	Deacon Manu (c)
HK	2	Talemaitoga Tuapati	(substituted off) 75'
LP	1	Campese Ma'afu	(substituted off) 71'
Replacements:
HK	16	Viliame Veikoso	(substituted in) 75'
PR	17	Penijamini Makutu	(substituted in) 71'
FL	18	Josefa Domolailai	(substituted in) 69'
FL	19	Samu Bola	(substituted in) 56'
SH	20	Vitori Buatava	(substituted in) 54'
FH	21	Waisea Luveniyali	(substituted in) 66'
WG	22	Adriu Delai	(substituted in) 75'
Coach:
(Fiji) Sam Domoni

Touch judges:
(New Zealand) Keith Brown
(Fiji) James Bolabiu

=== Round 3 ===
13 July 2011
12:40 (UTC+12)

Tonga	29–19	Samoa
Try: S. Taumalolo 32' c Helu 76' c Con: K. Morath (2/2) 32', 77'; Pen: K. Morath (5/6) 1', 16', 20', 35', 67'	Report	Try: Lemi 17' c Con: J. So'oialo (1/1) 18'; Pen: J. So'oialo (4/5) 4', 42', 44', 60'; Drop: J. So'oialo (0/1)

Churchill Park, Lautoka
Attendance: 2,020
Referee: Keith Brown (New Zealand)

FB	15	Vunga Lilo
RW	14	William Helu
OC	13	Suka Hufanga
IC	12	Hudson Tongaʻuiha	(substituted off) 64'
LW	11	Mateo Malupo
FH	10	Kurt Morath	(substituted off) 77'
SH	9	Soane Havea	(substituted off) 41'
N8	8	Samiu Vahafolau (c)
OF	7	Sione Vaiomoʻunga
BF	6	Viliame Maʻafu	(substituted off) 41'
RL	5	Joseph Tuineau	(substituted off) 41'
LL	4	Tukulua Lokotui	(yellow card) 40' to 50'
TP	3	Sila Puafisi
HK	2	Ilaisa Maʻasi	(substituted off) 61'
LP	1	Sona Taumalolo
Replacements:
HK	16	Ephraim Taukafa	(substituted in) 61'
PR	17	Maleko Latu
LK	18	Paino Hehea	(substituted in) 41'
FL	19	Sione Kalamafoni	(substituted in) 41'
SH	20	Samisoni Fisilau	(substituted in) 41'
FH	21	Tomasi Palu	(substituted in) 77'
CE	22	Viliame Iongi	(substituted in) 64'
Coach:
(New Zealand) Isitolo Maka

FB	15	James So'oialo
RW	14	Timoteo Iosua	(substituted off) 67'
OC	13	Fautua Otto
IC	12	Herman Porter
LW	11	David Lemi
FH	10	Fa'atonu Fili	(substituted off) 67'
SH	9	Brenton Helleur	(substituted off) 41'
N8	8	Ofisa Treviranus
OF	7	Ray Ofisa	(substituted off) 41'
BF	6	Manaia Salavea
RL	5	Jonathan Fa'amatuainu
LL	4	Filipo Levi (c)
TP	3	Census Johnston	(substituted off) 60'
HK	2	Ole Avei	(substituted off) 47'
LP	1	Simon Lemalu	(substituted off) 76'
Replacements:
HK	16	Ti'i Paulo	(substituted in) 47'
PR	17	Logovi'i Mulipola	(substituted in) 60'
PR	18	James Johnston	(substituted in) 76'
FL	19	Afa Aiono	(substituted in) 41'
SH	20	Lualua Vailoaloa	(substituted in) 41'
FH	21	Uale Mai	(substituted in) 67'
WG	22	Johnny Leota	(substituted in) 67'
Coach:
(Samoa) Titimaea Tafua

Touch judges:
(South Africa) Marius Jonker
(Fiji) James Bolabiu

13 July 2011
15:10 (UTC+12)

Japan	24–13	Fiji
Try: Aruga 45' m Nicholas 58' c Horie 63' m Imamura 80'+8' c Con: Nicholas (0/1); Webb (2/3) 59', 80'+9'	Report	Try: Nalaga (2) 6' m, 48' m Con: Bai (0/1); Buatava (0/1); Pen: Bai (1/2) 1'

Churchill Park, Lautoka
Attendance: 3,000
Referee: Peter Fitzgibbon (Ireland)

FB	15	Go Aruga	(substituted off) 56'
RW	14	Takehisa Usuzuki
OC	13	Koji Taira
IC	12	Ryan Nicholas	(substituted off) 68'
LW	11	Hirotoki Onozawa
FH	10	Murray Williams
SH	9	Atsushi Hiwasa
N8	8	Takashi Kikutani (c)
OF	7	Michael Leitch
BF	6	Itaru Taniguchi
RL	5	Toshizumi Kitagawa	(substituted off) 63'
LL	4	Justin Ives
TP	3	Nozomu Fujita	(substituted off) 53'
HK	2	Takeshi Kizu	(substituted off) 40'
LP	1	Naoki Kawamata
Replacements:
HK	16	Shota Horie	(substituted in) 40'
PR	17	Kensuke Hatakeyama	(substituted in) 53'
LK	18	Hitoshi Ono	(substituted in) 63'
FL	19	Tadasuke Nishihara
SH	20	Tomoki Yoshida
FB	21	Shaun Webb	(substituted in) 56'
CR	22	Yuta Imamura	(substituted in) 68'
Coach:
(New Zealand) John Kirwan

FB	15	Iliesa Keresoni	(substituted off) 63'
RW	14	Timoci Nagusa
OC	13	Ravai Fatiaki	(substituted off) 74'
IC	12	Seru Rabeni	(red card) 61'
LW	11	Napolioni Nalaga
FH	10	Seremaia Bai	(yellow card) 41' to 51'
SH	9	Vitori Buatava	(substituted off) 59'
N8	8	Sisa Koyamaibole	(red card) 23'
OF	7	Akapusi Qera	(substituted off) 64'
BF	6	Dominiko Waqaniburotu (c)	(yellow card) 21' to 31'
RL	5	Ifereimi Rawaqa	(substituted off) 52'
LL	4	Tevita Cavubati
TP	3	Setefano Somoca	(substituted off) 59'
HK	2	Sunia Koto
LP	1	Graham Dewes	(substituted off) 74'
Replacements:
PR	16	Waisea Daveta	(substituted in) 74'
PR	17	Penijamini Makutu	(substituted in) 59'
LK	18	Rupeni Nasiga	(substituted in) 52'
FL	19	Jim Naikadawa
SH	20	Waisale Vatuvoka	(substituted in) 59'
CR	21	Waisea Luveniyali	(substituted in) 74' (yellow card) 79' to 80'
FB	22	Taniela Rawaqa	(substituted in) 63'
Coach:
(Fiji) Sam Domoni

Touch judges:
(South Africa) Marius Jonker
(Fiji) James Bolabiu

== Top scorers ==
=== Top points scorers ===
Rank	Player	Team	Points
1	Kurt Morath	Tonga	56
2	James So'oialo	Samoa	33
3	Nicky Little	Fiji	18
4	Koliniasi Holani	Japan	10
4	Seko Kalou	Fiji	10
4	Alisona Taumalolo	Tonga	10
4	Alesana Tuilagi	Samoa	10
4	Naipolioni Nalaga	Fiji	10
9	Shaun Webb	Japan	9
10	James Arlidge	Japan	8

Source: irb.com

=== Top try scorers ===
Rank	Player	Team	Tries
1	Koliniasi Holani	Japan	2
1	Seko Kalou	Fiji	2
1	Alisona Taumalolo	Tonga	2
1	Alesana Tuilagi	Samoa	2
1	Naipolioni Nalaga	Fiji	2
6	25 players, Penalty try		1

Source: irb.com

== See also ==
- 2011 IRB Nations Cup
