= 2007 IRB Pacific Nations Cup =

2nd rugby union Pacific Nations Cup

Tournament details
- Countries: Australia A Fiji; Japan; Junior All Blacks; Samoa; Tonga
- Tournament format(s): Round-robin
- Date: 25 May - 24 June 2007

Tournament statistics
- Teams: 6
- Matches played: 15
- Attendance: 89,830 (5,989 per match)
- Tries scored: 92 (6.13 per match)
- Top point scorer(s): Clinton Schifcofske (Australia A) (64 points)
- Top try scorer(s): Ryan Cross (Australia A); Lachlan Turner (Australia A) (4 tries)

Final
- Champions: Junior All Blacks (2nd title)
- Runners-up: Australia A

The 2007 IRB Pacific Nations Cup was a rugby union competition held between six Pacific Rim sides; Australia A, Fiji, Japan, Samoa, Tonga and the Junior All Blacks (New Zealand's second XV). This was the first year that Australia A had competed – Australia had declined the invitation to compete in the inaugural competition in 2006 because they wanted to focus on their domestic competition, but on 18 October 2006 it was announced that they would send their second XV. For this reason, the inaugural tournament was renamed the Pacific Nations Cup instead of the IRB Pacific Five Nations as it had been called in 2006.

The tournament was a round-robin of 15 games where each team played one match against each of the others. There are four points for a win, two points for a draw and none for a defeat. There are also bonus points offered with one bonus point for scoring four or more tries in a match and one bonus point for losing by 7 points or less.

New Zealand's Junior All Blacks won the Cup for the second time in Round 4, gaining an unbeatable lead after beating Australia A 50–0 in Dunedin.

== Table ==
2007 IRB Pacific Nations Cup
	Team	Played	Won	Drawn	Lost	Points For	Points Against	Points Difference	Tries For	Tries Against	Try Bonus	Losing Bonus	Points
1	Junior All Blacks	5	5	0	0	228	34	+194	34	4	5	0	25
2	Australia A	5	3	1	1	172	104	+68	22	14	2	0	16
3	Samoa	5	3	0	2	96	67	+29	12	8	1	0	13
4	Fiji	5	1	1	3	70	115	-45	9	15	1	2	9
5	Tonga	5	1	0	4	69	184	-115	10	25	0	1	5
6	Japan	5	1	0	4	51	182	-131	5	26	0	0	4
Points breakdown: *4 points for a win *2 points for a draw *1 bonus point for a loss by seven points or less *1 bonus point for scoring four or more tries in a match

== Results ==
=== Round 1 ===
25 May 2007
19:30 AEST (UTC+10)

Australia A	60 – 15	Tonga
Try: Turner (3); Cross (2); Polota-Nau; Hewat; Schifcofske; Con: Schifcofske (6); Hewat; Pen: Schifcofske (2)	Report; Stats	Try: Kiole; Tupou; Con: Apikotoa; Pen: Apikotoa

Aussie Stadium, Sydney
Attendance: 5,912
Referee: Taizo Hirabayashi (Japan)

26 May 2007
13:00 (UTC+12)

Fiji	30 – 15	Japan
Try: T. Rawaqa; Talei; Qera; Neivua; Con: T. Rawaqa (2); Pen: T. Rawaqa (2)	Stats	Try: Tachikawa; Thompson; Con: Ando; Pen: Ando

Churchill Park, Lautoka
Attendance: 5,000
Referee: Federico Cuesta (Argentina)

26 May 2007
15:00 (UTC-11)

Samoa	10 – 31	Junior All Blacks
Try: Lemi; Con: G. Williams; Pen: G. Williams	Report; Stats	Try: Afoa; R. Gear (2); Tuiali'i; Filipo; Con: Donald (3)

Apia Park, Apia
Attendance: 15,000
Referee: James Leckie (Australia)

=== Round 2 ===
2 June 2007
13:00 (UTC+12)

Fiji	8 – 57	Junior All Blacks
Try: Lovobalavu; Pen: Buatava	Report	Try: Laulala; Ellis; Jane; R. Gear; Tuiali'i; Penalty try Hamilton; Tuʻipulotu; Con: Donald (4); Brett (3); Pen: Donald

ANZ National Stadium, Suva
Attendance: 21,988
Referee: Paul Marks (Australia)

2 June 2007
13:30 AEST (UTC+10)

Tonga	17 – 20	Japan
Try: Tupou; H. Tongaʻuiha; Lilo; Con: Apikotoa	Report; Stats	Try: Endo; Watanabe; Con: Ando (2); Pen: Ando (2)

BCU International Stadium, Coffs Harbour
Attendance: 2,528
Referee: Federico Cuesta (Argentina)

2 June 2007
15:30 AEST (UTC+10)

Australia A	27 – 15	Samoa
Try: Polota-Nau; Mumm; Beale; Con: Schifcofske (2/2); Hewat (1/1); Pen: Schifcofske (2/3)	Report; Stats	Try: Va'a; Thompson; Con: G. Williams (1/2); Pen: G. Williams (1/1)

BCU International Stadium, Coffs Harbour
Attendance: 2,528
Referee: Taizo Hirabayashi (Japan)

=== Round 3 ===
19 May 2007
15:00 (UTC-11)

Samoa	8 – 3	Fiji
Try: M. Schwalger 25' m Con: Crichton (0/1); Pen: Crichton (0/1); Williams 78'	Report; Stats	Pen: T. Rawaqa (1/1) 3'; Buatava (0/1)

Apia Park, Apia
Referee: Paul Marks (Australia)

9 June 2007
13:00 (UTC+13)

Tonga	13 – 39	Junior All Blacks
Try: Lilo (2); Pen: Lilo	Report; Stats	Try: Filipo; Witcombe; Holah; Tuʻipulotu; Tuitavake; Hamilton; Con: Brett (3); Pen: Brett

Teufaiva Sport Stadium, Nukuʻalofa
Attendance: 10,129
Referee: Federico Cuesta (Argentina)

9 June 2007
18:00 AEST (UTC+10)

Australia A	71 – 10	Japan
Try: Holmes (3); Cross (2); Schifcofske; Sare; Hardy; S. Ma'afu; Beale; Con: Schifcofske (9); Pen: Schifcofske	Report; Stats	Try: Robins; Con: K. Ono; Pen: K. Ono

Dairy Farmers Stadium, Townsville
Attendance: 4,745
Referee: James Bolabiu (Fiji)

=== Round 4 ===
16 June 2007
14:00 JST (UTC+09)

Japan	3 – 13	Samoa
Pen: Ando	Report; Stats	Try: Fa'atau; Con: Crichton; Pen: Crichton (2)

Yurtec Stadium, Sendai
Attendance: 7,905
Referee: Tim Hayes (Wales)

16 June 2007
14:30 (UTC+12)

Fiji	15 – 21	Tonga
Try: Leawere; Lovobalavu; Con: Luvenivali; Pen: Luvenivali	Report; Stats	Try: Hufanga; Lutui; Vahafolau; Pen: Lemoto (2)

Churchill Park, Lautoka
Attendance: 3,500
Referee: Chris Pollock (New Zealand)

16 June 2007
16:30 NZST (UTC+12)

Junior All Blacks	50 – 0	Australia A
Try: Donald; Donnelly; Lauaki; Tuitavake; Hamilton; Nonu; Braid; Con: Donald (6); Pen: Donald	Report

Carisbrook, Dunedin, Otago
Referee: Willie Roos (South Africa)

=== Round 5 ===
23 June 2007
15:00 (UTC-11)

Samoa	50 – 3	Tonga
Try: Johnston (2); Lemi (2); Ulia; M. Schwalger; Al. Tuilagi; Con: Crichton (4); Lui (2); Pen: Crichton	Report; Stats	Pen: Hola

Apia Park, Apia
Referee: Willie Roos (South Africa)

23 June 2007
15:00 (UTC+12)

Fiji	14 – 14	Australia A
Try: Bolavucu (2); Con: Luveniyali (2)	Report	Try: Turner; Pen: Shepherd (2); Schifcofske

ANZ National Stadium, Suva
Referee: Chris Pollock (New Zealand)

24 June 2007
14:00 JST (UTC+09)

Japan	3 – 51	Junior All Blacks
Pen: Ando	Report; Stats	Try: Crockett; Tuʻipulotu; Brett; Tuitavake; Nonu; Wulf; Donald (2); Con: Brett (2); Donald (2); Pen: Brett

Chichibunomiya Rugby Stadium, Tokyo
Attendance: 13,123
Referee: Tim Hayes (Wales)

== Top scorers ==
=== Top points scorers ===
Rank	Player	Team	Points
1	Clinton Schifcofske	Australia A	64
2	Stephen Donald	Junior All Blacks	51
3	Stephen Brett	Junior All Blacks	32
4	Eiji Ando	Japan	21
5	Ryan Cross	Australia A	20
5	Lachlan Turner	Australia A	20
7	Loki Crichton	Samoa	19
8	Vunga Lilo	Tonga	18
8	Taniela Maravunwasawasa	Fiji	18
10	Rico Gear	Junior All Blacks	15
10	Scott Hamilton	Junior All Blacks	15
10	Josh Holmes	Australia A	15
10	David Lemi	Samoa	15
10	Tane Tuʻipulotu	Junior All Blacks	15

Source: irb.com

=== Top try scorers ===
Rank	Player	Team	Tries
1	Ryan Cross	Australia A	4
1	Lachlan Turner	Australia A	4
3	Stephen Donald	Junior All Blacks	3
3	Rico Gear	Junior All Blacks	3
3	Scott Hamilton	Junior All Blacks	3
3	Josh Holmes	Australia A	3
3	David Lemi	Samoa	3
3	Vunga Lilo	Tonga	3
3	Tane Tuʻipulotu	Junior All Blacks	3
10	14 players		2
24	34 players + penalty try		1

Source: irb.com

== See also ==
- 2007 IRB Nations Cup
- Pacific Tri-Nations
