= So'oialo =

Surname

So'oialo is a surname, and may refer to:

- James So'oialo (born 2 March 1989), Samoan rugby union footballer, brother of Rodney and Steven
- Rodney So'oialo (born 3 October 1979), New Zealand rugby union player, brother of James and Steven
- Steven So'oialo (born 11 May 1977), Samoan rugby union footballer, brother of James and Rodney
