= Taumoefolau =

Taumoefolau is a surname. Notable people with the surname include:

- Kyren Taumoefolau (born 2003), Tongan rugby union player
- Nofomuli Taumoefolau (born 1956), Tongan rugby union player
