= Stephen Donald =

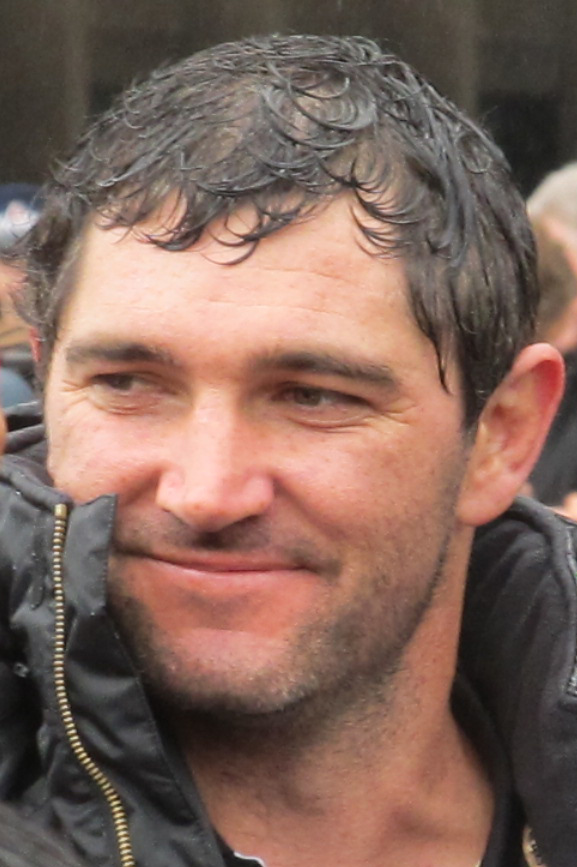
- Donald during the World Cup parade, October 2011
- Full name: Stephen Rex Donald
- Born: 3 December 1983 (age 42) Papakura, New Zealand
- Height: 190 cm (6 ft 3 in)
- Weight: 96 kg (212 lb; 15 st 2 lb)
- School: (1)Waiuku College (2) Wesley College
- University: University of Waikato

Rugby union career
- Position(s): First five-eighth, Centre
- Current team: NEC Green Rockets
Senior career
Years	Team	Apps	(Points)
2001, 2017	Counties Manukau	31	(203)
2004–2016	Waikato	60	(494)
2005–2011, 2016-2019	Chiefs	106	(886)
2011–2013	Bath	34	(169)
2013–2014	Mitsubishi Dynaboars	6	(45)
2016–2017	Suntory Sungoliath	4	(5)
2017–2018	Toshiba Brave Lupus	5	(5)
2018–2019	NEC Green Rockets	12	(42)
- Correct as of 6 June 2020
International career
Years	Team	Apps	(Points)
2003–2004	New Zealand U21	9	(68)
2005–2007	Junior All Blacks	10	(69)
2008–2011	New Zealand	25	(116)
2010–2011	Barbarian F.C.	4	(20)
- Correct as of 6 June 2020

Stephen Rex Donald (born 3 December 1983) is a retired New Zealand rugby union player who played for the NEC Green Rockets in the Japanese Top League. A first five-eighth or centre, he won 24 international caps for New Zealand. Nicknamed 'Beaver', he is best known for kicking the winning penalty in the 2011 Rugby World Cup final.

== Background ==
Donald grew up in Waiuku where his father was a teacher. He attended Sandspit Road School and Waiuku College. After the Sixth Form year he was given the opportunity to go to Wesley College for his final year.

He played First five-eighth for the Wesley First XV rugby team, coached by Nick Leger, along with Sitiveni Sivivatu, Tame Tupou, Viliame Veikoso, Sailosi Tagicakibau, Ezra Taylor and Tomasi Soqeta.

== Domestic career ==
=== Waikato ===
Initially progressing and playing through all levels for the Waikato province in the ITM Cup.

=== Chiefs ===
He then played for the Chiefs in the Super Rugby competition. He would initially play for the franchise from 2005 until 2011.

In 2015, Donald had signed to return to New Zealand to play for Waikato in the ITM Cup. Donald made his return with Waikato on 10 September 2015 against Southland at Waikato Stadium, coming on as a substitute.

In June 2016, Donald captained the Chiefs to a dominating win over Wales. Although the Welsh were the strong favourites going into the match, Donald had played a 'man of the match' role, dominating his opponents whilst also setting up two tries and perfect goal-kicking percentage which saw the Chiefs beat the Welsh 40–7. Donald also received a standing ovation from the crowd after being subbed in the 68th minute. Donald was controversially disallowed a try just before halftime after the TMO could not see any clear grounding of the ball.

In February 2019 it was announced that Donald had joined the Chiefs once again as injury cover for Tiaan Falcon.

=== Bath Rugby ===
Donald signed for English Premiership club Bath Rugby for a 2 1/2-year deal. Initially denied a work permit, Bath appealed the decision against the UK Government and, with the support of the RFU, won their appeal against the refusal. Donald joined Bath after the Rugby World Cup 2011, making his début in the 68th minute of their Heineken Cup clash with Glasgow on 13 November 2011, scoring a penalty with 90 seconds to go.

The Blues denied reports stating that Donald had signed for the team for 2012 as a replacement for Stephen Brett and Luke McAlister, who are both heading overseas.

=== Mitsubishi Dynaboars ===
In April 2013, it was announced Donald would leave Bath Rugby to join Japanese side Mitsubishi Sagamihara DynaBoars in the Top League for the 2013/14 season.

== International career ==
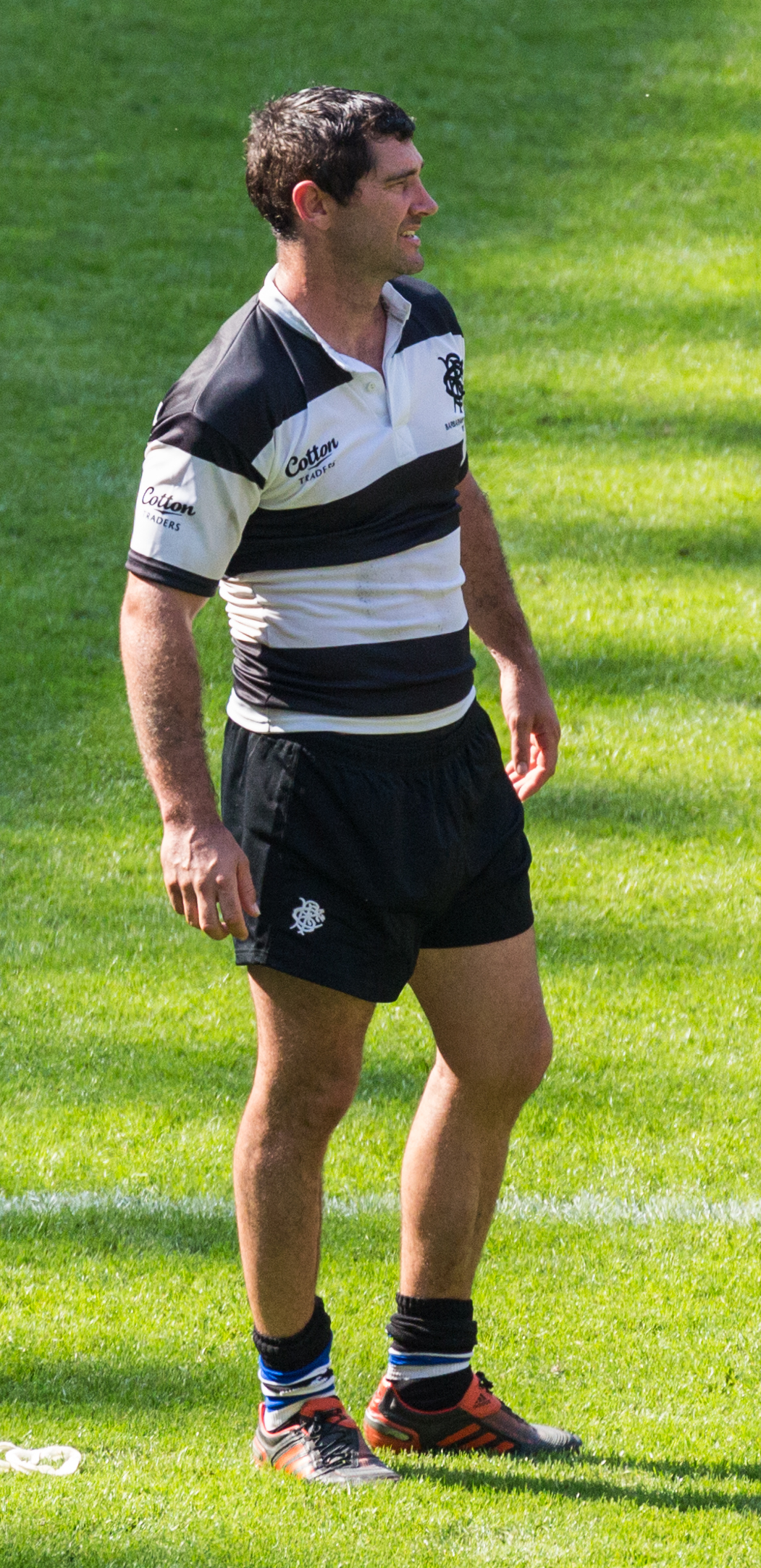
Stephen Donald representing the Barbarians F.C. against England at Twickenham Stadium

Despite an international career that had not lived up to expectations, he played for New Zealand from 2008 to 2011. Donald kicked the winning penalty for New Zealand in the 2011 Rugby World Cup final.

Donald played on an international-level for the All Blacks from 2008 to 2011. Throughout his time playing for the All Blacks, Donald had been the subject of harsh criticism as well as high praise.

One instance of note was in October 2010, when the All Blacks faced off against the Wallabies in a Bledisloe Cup match in Hong Kong. In the 60th minute of the game, Donald came on as a substitute for Dan Carter and the All Blacks held a five-point lead, just after Drew Mitchell scored a converted try. Donald had missed a penalty-kick that would have put the game out of reach. The situation was made worse when Donald failed to kick the ball into touch in the dying minutes of the game. After launching a counter-attack, James O'Connor scored a try in the corner to level the score. O'Connor managed to convert that try to win the game for the Australians and the blame of the loss fell primarily on Donald. Although defended by team personnel, Donald had seemingly fallen out of favour with the public and selectors. After the 2010 season had culminated, the All Black selectors looked toward players such as Colin Slade and Aaron Cruden more favourably. Donald was not named in the initial 2011 Rugby World Cup All Blacks squad and with his forthcoming move to Bath Rugby, it seemed to be the end of his All Black career.

However, a string of injures hit the All Blacks that would see Donald return to the squad. During training the day before the All Blacks match against Canada, Dan Carter sustained a tournament-ending groin injury and was subsequently replaced by Aaron Cruden. On 9 October, Colin Slade sustained a groin tear which led to Donald receiving a call-up as replacement first-five for the All Blacks heading into the finals. A cartoon by Tom Scott in the lead-up to the 2011 Rugby World Cup final described it as a "nightmare" if New Zealand's fate was left in his hands. Donald was not used in the semi-final against Australia, however he would be used in the final against France. Cruden sustained a knee injury 34 minutes into the first half, which left Donald to take to the field. After receiving a penalty in the 46th minute, Donald converted a penalty-kick which extended their lead to eight points. Shortly afterwards, France regained the ball from the kick-off and Thierry Dusautoir scored under the posts, bringing the score to 8–7. Despite the resilient and strong performance from the French, this would be their only set of points scored in the final. Coupled with Tony Woodcock's try, Donald's penalty-kick was ultimately what won the New Zealand side their second Rugby World Cup. After the final, Donald was hailed as the player that won the World Cup for New Zealand and had become somewhat of a national hero thereafter.

In honour of his contribution to winning the World Cup, his local rugby club in Waiuku has renamed their home ground to Beaver Park.

A biopic on Donald's journey to the World Cup final entitled "The Kick" screened on TVNZ on 10 August 2014.

Stephen appeared on the second episode of The Masked Singer NZ as "Moa", being unmasked in his first appearance.

== Statistics ==
Test record overall:

Opposition	Played	Won	Drawn	Lost	Winning %	Tries	Conversions	Penalties	Drop goals	Points total
Australia	7	6	0	1	85.71	0	1	5	0	17
England	2	2	0	0	100	0	1	0	0	2
France	4	3	0	1	75	0	0	7	0	21
Ireland	1	1	0	0	100	0	0	0	0	0
Italy	1	1	0	0	100	0	0	0	0	0
Samoa	1	1	0	0	100	1	7	0	0	19
Scotland	2	2	0	0	100	0	4	2	0	14
South Africa	4	1	0	3	25	0	2	7	0	25
Wales	1	1	0	0	100	0	0	0	0	0
Total	23	18	0	5	78.26	1	15	21	0	98

== Television ==
Donald appeared alongside Israel Dagg and Hamish Dodd in the New Zealand 2023 television series, Clubhouse Rescue.

== Honours ==
=== Waikato ===
- NPC/Air New Zealand Cup Champion, 2006
- Ranfurly Shield holder

=== Chiefs ===
- Super Rugby Runners up: 2009

=== Bath ===
- European Challenge Cup Runners Up: 2013–2014

=== New Zealand ===
- Rugby World Cup Winner: 2011
- Tri Nations Winner: 2008
- Bledisloe Cup Winner (3): 2008–2010
