= Wesley College, Auckland =

Wesley College Te Kura O Te Haahi Weteriana O Aotearoa

Location
- State Highway 22, Pukekohe, New Zealand; 37.1488°S 174.8898°E

Information
- Type: State integrated secondary (year 9–13), 9 & 10 girls now accepted.
- Motto: Fide Litteris Labore
- Established: 1844; 182 years ago
- Ministry of Education Institution no.: 104
- Principal: Brian Evans
- Enrolment: 330 (July 2026)
- Socio-economic decile: 1C
- Website: www.wesley.school.nz

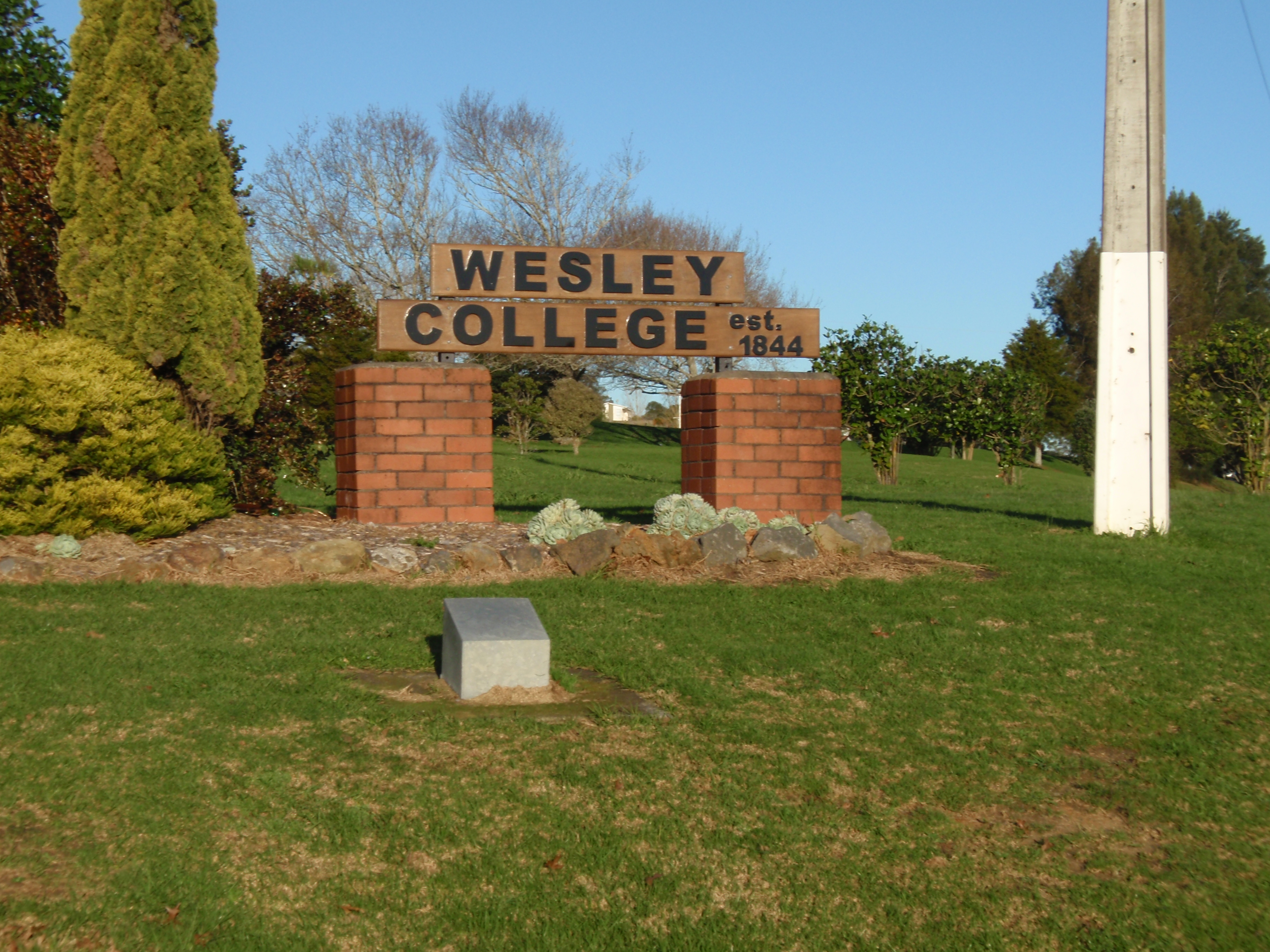
College entrance in Paerata

Wesley College is a secondary school in Paerata, at the northern edge of Pukekohe, Auckland Region, New Zealand. The school provides education from year 9 to 13.

The school was founded by members of the Methodist Church in 1844, making it one of the country's oldest schools. Initially located in Grafton and then the Three Kings area of Auckland, it closed in 1868 before reopening in 1876 in Three Kings again. From the beginning there was an emphasis on educating Maori boys, and also played a prominent role in educating students from countries of the South Pacific. In 1924 the school was moved to its current location of Paerata, near Pukekohe. In 1985 it was one of the first boys schools in New Zealand to admit girls at the senior level.

== Prince Albert College ==
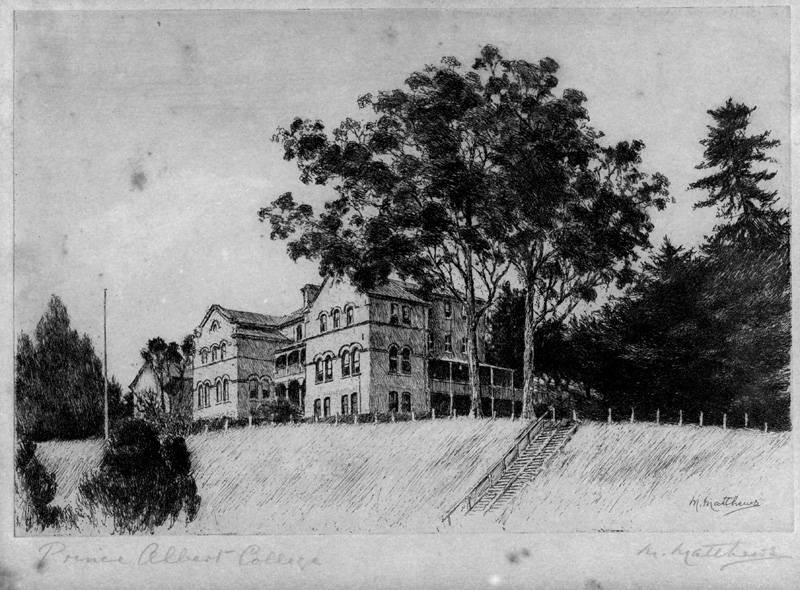
Prince Albert College in Upper Queen Street, Auckland

Wesley College was located in Upper Queen Street when it closed in 1868; the building and land was donated to the Methodist Church for education purposes. In 1895, a new school with Methodist links started in that building, known as Prince Albert College. The school closed on 31 December 1906 due to financial pressures. The building was later used by Auckland Girls' Grammar School.

== Principals ==
The following have been principals of the school:

- Revs. Alexander Reid, Thomas Buddle, George Stannard, HH Lawry, Wallis
- Rev. J H Simmonds 1895–1923
- R. C. Clark, MA (Melb), Dip Ed 1924–1944
- Rev. E. M. Marshall, BA, Dip Ed 1944–1964
- C. A. Neate, MA, Dip Tchg 1965–1967
- E. Te R. Tauroa, B AgricSc, Dip Ed, Dip Tchg 1968–1973 Believed to be the first Māori principal of a secondary school, later Race Relations Conciliator.
- J. B. McDougall, E.D., B Agric Sc, Dip Tchg 1974–1988
- G. V. Cowley, MSc (Hons), Dip Tchg, JP 1989–2002
- I. F. Faulkner, JP, MA (Hons), Dip Tchg 2003–?
- S. Hargreaves
- Dr. B. Evans -present

== Notable alumni ==
=== The arts ===
- Temuera Morrison – Actor (Head Prefect, 1977)
- Ian Mune – Actor and Film Director
- Richard Taylor – Multiple Academy Award Winner (Lord of the Rings Trilogy)
- Arnold Manaaki Wilson – Artist and Sculptor, Father of Contemporary Maori Art, First Maori to gain a Diploma in Fine Arts

==== Public service ====
- Koro Dewes – Ngāti Porou kaumatua and Māori language advocate
- Sialeʻataongo Tuʻivakanō – Prime Minister of Tonga (Voted in 2011 – Known as Siale Kaho while at College)
- Jim Peters – Politician
- Sir Peter Kenilorea – First Prime Minister and Current Speaker of Solomon Islands
- Roger McClay – Politician and Children's Commissioner
- Todd McClay – Member of Parliament for Rotorua, former Cook Islands diplomat (Ambassador to European Union)
- Rt Hon. Baron Fielakepa – Chief of the Defense Staff, His Majesty’s Armed Forces, Kingdom of Tonga
- Rob Storey – Politician
- Malietoa Tanumafili II – Former Head of State of Samoa
- George Tupou II – King of Tonga
- Baron Vaea – former Prime Minister of Tonga (Vaea attended between 1938 and 1941)

=== Science ===
- Walter Buller – lawyer, naturalist and ornithologist

=== Sport ===
Rugby Union

- Uini Atonio – Counties Manukau, La Rochelle, France
- Stephen Donald – New Zealand Secondary Schools, New Zealand u19s, New Zealand u21s, Counties, Waikato, Chiefs, Bath, New Zealand All Black
- Rhys Duggan – New Zealand Secondary Schools, New Zealand u19s, New Zealand u21s Waikato, Chiefs, New Zealand All Black
- Epalahame Faiva – Wakato, New Zealand u20s
- Malakai Fekitoa – Auckland, Highlanders, New Zealand All Black
- Frank Halai – Waikato, NZ Sevens, Counties Manukau, Blues, New Zealand All Black
- Kauvaka Kaivelata- Counties Manukau Steelers, Pukekohe Rugby Club, Manukau Rovers, Chiefsu18, Chiefs Super Rugby
- Sekope Kepu – New Zealand U17's, New Zealand Secondary Schools, New Zealand u19s, New Zealand u21s, Counties, NSW Waratahs, Australia – Wallabies
- Casey Laulala – New Zealand u19s, New Zealand u21s, Counties, Canterbury, Crusaders, Cardiff Blues, New Zealand All Black
- Nepo Laulala – Canterbury, Crusaders, New Zealand All Blacks
- Jonah Lomu – New Zealand U16's, New Zealand U17's, New Zealand Secondary Schools, New Zealand u19s, New Zealand u21s, Counties, Wellington, North Harbour, Blues, Chiefs, Hurricanes, Cardiff Blues, NZ Sevens, New Zealand All Black
- Tevita Mailau – New Zealand Secondary Schools, New Zealand u19s, New Zealand u21s, Northland, Auckland, Blues, Tonga Ikale Tahi
- Seilala Mapusua – New Zealand Secondary Schools, New Zealand u19s, New Zealand u21s, Otago, Highlanders, London Irish, Kubota Spears, Manu Samoa
- Sione Molia – All Blacks Sevens
- Charles Piutau – New Zealand Secondary Schools, New Zealand u20s, Auckland, NZ Sevens, Blues, New Zealand All Black
- Siale Piutau – Counties, Highlanders, Tonga Ikale Tahi
- Augustine Pulu – Counties, Chiefs, New Zealand All Black, NZ Sevens
- David Raikuna – Counties, North Harbour, Blues, NZ Sevens
- Doug Rollerson – Manawatu, New Zealand All Black
- Sitiveni Sivivatu – Counties, Waikato, Chiefs, ASM Clermont Auvergne, Pacific Islanders, New Zealand All Black
- George Stowers – New Zealand Secondary Schools, NZ u21s, Counties, Chiefs, Ospreys, Pacific Islanders, Manu Samoa
- Niva Ta'auso – Counties, Connacht, New Zealand Divisional XV, Junior All Blacks
- Michael Tagicakibau – Taranaki, London Welsh, Saracens, Fiji
- Sailosi Tagicakibau – Chiefs, London Irish, Pacific Islanders, Manu Samoa
- Jonathan Taumateine – Counties Manukau, Manu Samoa u20s, New Zealand u20s, Chiefs
- Ezra Taylor – Otago, Highlanders, Reds, Connacht, Manu Samoa
- Karl Tu'inukuafe – North Harbour, Chiefs, New Zealand All Blacks
- Hale T-Pole – New Zealand Secondary Schools, New Zealand u19s, New Zealand u21s, Southland, Highlanders, Pacific Islanders, Tonga Ikale Tahi
- Viliame Veikoso – Otago, Fiji
- Tupou Vaa'i – Chiefs & New Zealand All Blacks

Rugby League

- Glen Fisiiahi – New Zealand Warriors player
- Fetuli Talanoa – Tonga Rugby League International/South Sydney Rabbitohs
- Tame Tupou – Kiwis/Brisbane Broncos/Bradford Bulls
- Tom Ale – NZ Warriors
- Adam Pompey – NZ Warriors
- Lunalangi Veainu – Kiwi Ferns, Black Ferns, Counties Manukau Heat

== See also ==
- Lists of schools in New Zealand
