= Holani =

Holani is a surname. Notable people with the surname include:

- George Holani (born 1999), American football player
- Koliniasi Holani (born 1981), Tongan-born, Japanese rugby union player.
