= Vitori =

Vitori is a surname. Notable people with the surname include:

- Brian Vitori (born 1990), Zimbabwean cricketer
- Vitori Buatava (born 1985), Fijian rugby union player
