= Polu =

Polu may refer to:

- Polu, Ghana
- Polu, Khuzestan, Iran
- Polu or pilaf, a rice dish
- Junior Polu, Samoan rugby player
