= Michael Tagicakibau =

Fiji international rugby union player (born 1985)

- Full name: Michael Leroy Tagicakibau
- Born: 9 May 1985 (age 41) Auckland, New Zealand
- Height: 190 cm (6 ft 3 in)
- Weight: 98 kg (216 lb; 15 st 6 lb)
- School: Wesley College
- Notable relative: Sailosi Tagicakibau (brother)

Rugby union career
- Position(s): Wing, Centre
Senior career
Years	Team	Apps	(Points)
2006–2007	Taranaki	11	(5)
2008–2009	London Welsh	26	(50)
2009–2014	Saracens	54	(30)
2012	Bristol	10	(5)
2014–2016	Scarlets	27	(5)
2016–2018	Benetton	12	(10)
2018	Manawatu	4	(5)
- Correct as of 30 May 2020
International career
Years	Team	Apps	(Points)
2007–2011	Fiji	6	(0)
- Correct as of 30 May 2020

Michael Tagicakibau (born 9 May 1985) is a Fijian rugby union player and coach. His usual position was on the wing. He is the brother of former Samoa international winger Sailosi Tagicakibau. but unlike his brother Michael played internationally for Fiji.

== Career ==
Tagicakibau played in the Air NZ Cup for Taranaki before attending the trials for the Flying Fijians in 2007. He was part of the Fiji squad for the 2007 Pacific Nations Cup and made his debut against Tonga in June 2007 at Churchill Park, Lautoka and though he did not make the squad for the 2007 Rugby World Cup, he impressed the London Welsh team who he joined in February 2008.

In 2008 he moved to London Welsh RFC in National League 1 and after an impressive first full season in English rugby, Saracens' then-Director of Rugby Brendan Venter signed him up for the 2009/10 season. He also played for Bristol. He played with the English club, Saracens until July 2014. and later with Scarlets.

Tagicakibau also played for the professional Italian team Benetton Treviso.

In 2018 he signed to play for Manawatu in the Mitre 10 Cup and played 4 games for the union.

In 2024 Tagicakibau coached Kia Toa to win the Manawatu rugby union's Hankins Shield Senior A Club competition.
