= Sona Taumalolo =

Tongan rugby union player

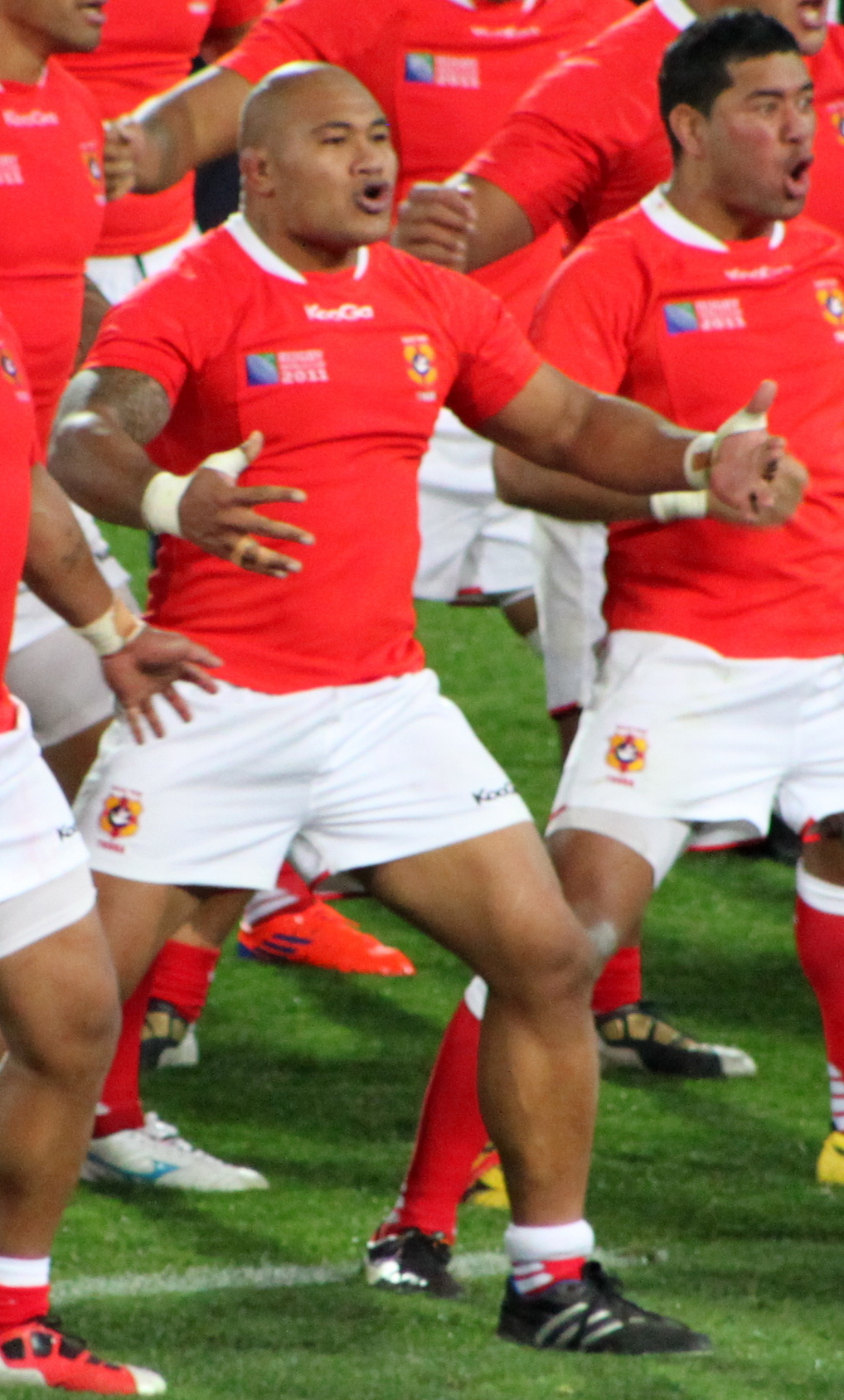
- Taumalolo playing for Tonga vs France during 2011 Rugby World Cup
- Full name: Faka'ānaua ki 'Alisona Taumalolo, also known as Arizona Taumalolo or Sona Tafuna (former nickname)
- Born: 13 November 1981 (age 45) Ha'akame, Tonga
- Height: 1.85 m (6 ft 1 in)
- Weight: 112 kg (17 st 9 lb; 247 lb)
- School: Tupou College, Tonga
- Notable relative: Ben Tameifuna (nephew)

Rugby union career
- Position: Loosehead prop
Senior career
Years	Team	Apps	(Points)
2005-2011, 2020	Hawke's Bay	64	(90)
2009-2012	Chiefs	52	(75)
2012-2014	Perpignan	52	(20)
2014-2015	Racing Métro	0	(0)
2015-2018	Grenoble	70	(70)
2018-2020	Provence	31	(15)
- Correct as of 8 February 2021
International career
Years	Team	Apps	(Points)
2011-2015, 2021	Tonga	21	(20)
2014	Barbarian F.C.	1	(0)
2014	World XV	1	(0)
- Correct as of 25 July 2021

Sona Taumalolo (born 13 November 1981) is a former professional rugby union player. He played at prop for Hawke's Bay in New Zealand's domestic Mitre 10 Cup competition; the Chiefs in Super Rugby; several French clubs; and the Tonga national team. He retired at the end of the 2020 Mitre 10 Cup season.

== Early and personal life ==
Taumalolo was born in Tonga, where he attended Tupou College. In 2001, he emigrated to New Zealand.

He is the uncle of New Zealand-born Tonga representative Ben Tameifuna.

== Senior career ==
=== Hawke's Bay ===
Having represented Auckland at under 21 level, Taumalolo made the step up to senior rugby in 2005. After playing for Clive Rugby & Sports Club in Hawke's Bay's club rugby competition, Taumalolo was - for the first time - named in the Magpies squad for the 2005 National Provincial Championship (Division 2). He made his Hawke's Bay debut on Saturday 13 August 2005 against Nelson Bays and scored a try on debut. From 2005 to 2011, he represented Hawke's Bay in 61 games, of which 10 National Provincial Championship games, 39 Air New Zealand Cup games and 6 ITM Cup games.

In 2020, Taumalolo returned to Hawke's Bay from France to play one last Mitre 10 Cup season for the Magpies, taking the field in 3 games. He retired from professional rugby at the end of a season that saw the Magpies win the 2020 Mitre 10 Cup Championship title and the Ranfurly Shield.

=== Chiefs ===
Taumalolo first joined the Chiefs for the 2009 Super 14 season. He made his Super Rugby debut for the Chiefs on 14 February 2009 against the Crusaders.

The 2012 Super Rugby season was his last, but also his most successful season with the Chiefs. Not only did the Chiefs win their first Super Rugby title that year, Taumalolo also scored 9 tries, placing him in equal third place on the 'top try scorer' list of the 2012 season.

=== Perpignan ===
In June 2012, it was announced that Taumalolo had signed a three-year contract with French club Perpignan that competed in the Top 14 competition. During his first two seasons with the club, he also played games for the Amlin Challenge Cup and Heineken Cup. Perpignan was relegated after the 2013–14 season to the 2nd tier Pro D2 competition.

=== Racing-Métro ===
At the start of the 2014–15 Top 14 season, Taumalolo joined Racing Métro as an injury replacement ("joker médical"), but he didn't play a single game for the club.

=== Grenoble ===
In June 2015, Grenoble announced that Taumalolo would join the club ahead of the 2015–16 Top 14 season. During that first season, he played with Grenoble for the European Rugby Challenge Cup. However, after his second season with the club, Grenoble was relegated to the Pro D2 for the 2017-18 season. Their stay in the Pro D2 didn't last long; at the end of the season, the club secured promotion back to the Top 14 for the 2018-19 season after defeating Oyonnax in a promotion/relegation match. Taumalolo scored a total of 8 tries that season, including one try in that last match.

In May 2018, Taumalolo re-signed with Grenoble for another season. However, after medical tests, he was declared unfit to continue playing due to "spinal anomalies" and Grenoble terminated his contract.

=== Provence Rugby ===
The medical decision that ended Taumalolo's career at Grenoble was reversed just over a month later by independent doctors mandated by the LNR (French National Rugby League) and he was allowed to play again. On 18 September 2018, Pro D2 club Provence Rugby - promoted from Fédérale 1 at the end of the 2017–18 season - announced the signing of Taumalolo as an additional player ("joueur supplémentaire"). Due to the COVID-19 pandemic, the French domestic competition was suspended in March 2020, cutting short his second season with the club. He returned home to Hawke's Bay in New Zealand.

== International career ==
Taumalolo represented Tonga at under-19 level at the 2000 IRB-FIRA U19 World Cup (Division B) held in France.

On 2 July 2011, Taumalolo made his senior international debut for Tonga against Fiji in the 2011 IRB Pacific Nations Cup. He scored a try on debut. In the first game of the 2011 Rugby World Cup against New Zealand, Taumalolo scored his country's only try in a 41–10 loss. He played the last of his 20 test matches - also against New Zealand - during the 2015 Rugby World Cup. He scored a total of 4 tries (20 points) during his international career.

Taumalolo has also played for the Barbarians. On 1 June 2014, the "Baabaas" defeated an England XV side 39 to 29 at Twickenham, London. Six days later, he also played for the World XV team against South Africa in Cape Town.

Taumalolo made a shock international return for Tonga against the Cook Islands in a qualification match for the 2023 Rugby World Cup on 24 July 2021, called out of retirement as injury cover for Jethro Felemi.
