= Junior Poluleuligaga =

Samoa international rugby union player

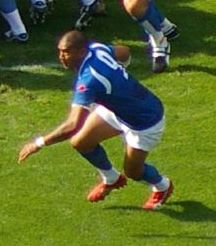
- Full name: Aukusitino Junior Poluleuligaga
- Born: 5 February 1981 (age 45) Ōtāhuhu, New Zealand
- Height: 1.80 m (5 ft 11 in)
- Weight: 96 kg (15 st 2 lb; 212 lb)
- School: St Joseph's Primary School, Otahuhu; De La Salle College, Mangere East

Rugby union career
- Position: Scrum-Half
Senior career
Years	Team	Apps	(Points)
2004–07	North Harbour	25	(10)
2004	Blues	9	(5)
2007–08	Toulon	18	(0)
2008–09	Harlequins	9	(0)
2009	Bay of Plenty	14	(10)
2010	Chiefs	12	(5)
2010–13	Exeter Chiefs	25	(0)
2013–	Auckland	18	(5)
- Correct as of 19 October 2014
International career
Years	Team	Apps	(Points)
2006	Pacific Islanders	2	(0)
2007 –	Samoa	25	(20)
- Correct as of 23 June 2013

Aukusitino Junior Poluleuligaga (born 5 February 1981) is a Samoan rugby union international player. He previously played for Exeter Chiefs in the Aviva Premiers before returning to Auckland and played two years with Auckland rugby union team before retiring 2015. He played as a Scrum-half and was educated at De La Salle College, Mangere East. His name is often abbreviated to Junior Polu. He is currently the Director of Rugby for Brothers Rugby Club in Brisbane, Australia. He also worked at Sunnybank Rugby Club in Brisbane as a Rugby Development Manager and before moving to Australia he was the Director of Rugby and General Manager for the Papatoetoe Rugby Football Club, Auckland New Zealand.

== Career ==
So much of Junior Poluleuligaga's career depended on his great rival Steve So'oialo. Polu began his career by breaking into the North Harbour provincial side, he was spotted for the Samoan national team and in 2006 was selected to nationalise to play for his parents country, representing composite side Pacific Islanders as a Samoan, having been unwanted for the 2004 tour due to the presence of So'oialo.

=== Pacific Islanders' Tour ===
A solid tour as Mosese Rauluni's understudy lead to several offers from European clubs, but Polu declined and remained true to his North Harbour contract and returned home.

=== International career ===
Following the success of the Pacific Islanders tour Polu represented Samoa in the IRB Pacific Nations Cup in the summer of 2007 due to the absence of So'oialo. Here he was again 2nd choice to So'oialo, although his luck was about the change.

=== 2007 World Cup ===
So'oialo and Polu were both selected for the 2007 RWC squad, as Samoa looked to upset 2003 champions England and eventual champions South Africa. Polu was selected ahead of So'oialo for the opening game against the springboks, which they lost despite an encouraging start. So'oialo was restored for the derby game against Tonga which despite entering as overwhelming favourites lost 19–12. Polu was once again restored for the do or die game with England setting up an excellent try for Mahonri Schwalger. Having travelled north to France for the world cup Polu joined RC Toulon on a short-term deal.

=== Harlequins ===
In the off season before the 2008/09 season he signed for Harlequins ironically moving to join So'oialo, and has since ousted his great rival for the bench spot behind England scrum half Danny Care. When his Harlequins contract finished in the summer of 2009 he joined the Bay of Plenty Steamers in the Air New Zealand Cup.

=== Waikato Chiefs ===
In 2010 Junior Polu was selected for the Waikato Chiefs as a backup Scrum Half for Brendon Leonard. On 21 February 2010 Junior Polu was selected ahead of Leonard at No. 9 against the Lions.

=== Exeter Chiefs ===
On 17 August 2010 Exeter Chiefs announced that they had completed a deal and visa for Junior. It was announced in local media in Devon, England that Polu will be leaving Exeter Chiefs at the end of the 2012/13 season.

In 2015 he was selected for the Asia Pacific Dragons.
