= Fred Fatiaki =

Fijian paralympic athlete, coach, official

Personal information
- Nationality: Fijian

Sport
- Country: Fiji
- Sport: Track and field

Achievements and titles
- Paralympic finals: Coached Fiji and Pacific Island's first Paralympic Gold Medallist at 2012 Summer Paralympics

Fred Fatiaki is a Fijian Paralympic athlete, athletics coach and official. He coached the first Fijian and Pacific Islander to ever win a gold medal at the 2012 Summer Paralympics, Iliesa Delana who he had been coaching since 2006.

In 2013 he won the Fiji Sports Awards Coach of the Year for 2012. Fatiaki has been working for the Fiji Paralympic Committee since 2008.

Fred is the older brother of Fijian rugby union player Ravai Fatiaki.
