= Penijamini Makutu =

- Full name: Penijamini Navidividinisiga Makutu
- Born: 1 April 1989 (age 37) Sigatoka, Fiji
- Height: 6 ft 4 in (193 cm)
- Weight: 240 lb (109 kg)
- Occupation: Soldier

Rugby union career
- Position: Prop
International career
Years	Team	Apps	(Points)
2011–12	Fiji	4	(0)

Ratu Penijamini Navidividinisiga Makutu (born 1 April 1989) is a Fijian rugby union player.

== Rugby union career ==
A prop, Makutu made his debut for Fiji against Tonga in the 2011 IRB Pacific Nations Cup, gaining further caps in later tournament matches against Samoa and Japan. He made the initial Fiji squad for the 2011 Rugby World Cup but after breaking his arm was replaced by Graham Dewes. His fourth and final cap came in Fiji's 2012 match against England at Twickenham. He has played rugby for Nadroga and Suva.

== Military ==
Makutu, a member of the Republic of Fiji Military Forces, has served in the Middle East with United Nations peacekeeping forces.

== See also ==
- List of Fiji national rugby union players
