= Jamie Helleur =

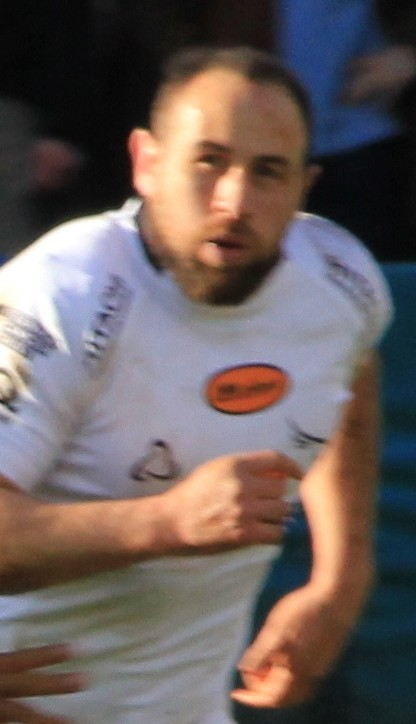
- Helleur in 2014
- Born: 21 November 1983 (age 42) Auckland, New Zealand
- Height: 1.80 m (5 ft 11 in)
- Weight: 89 kg (14 st 0 lb)
- Notable relative: Brenton Helleur (brother)

Rugby union career
- Position: Centre
Senior career
Years	Team	Apps	(Points)
2011–16	Newcastle Falcons	47	(40)
- Correct as of 23 September 2014
Provincial / State sides
Years	Team	Apps	(Points)
2004-2010	Auckland	44	(20)
2008	North Harbour (loan)	1	(0)
Super Rugby
Years	Team	Apps	(Points)
2009	Blues	9	(10)
International career
Years	Team	Apps	(Points)
2010	Samoa	4	(0)

Jamie Helleur (born 21 November 1983) is a former New Zealand-born Samoan rugby union player who last played for the Newcastle Falcons in the Aviva Premiership. He played as a centre and represented Samoa internationally.

Helleur made his debut for Auckland in 2004 and spent parts of seven seasons for the province, accumulating 44 appearances. He spent a single season in Super Rugby for the Blues in 2009, but was not retained for the following campaign.

For the 2011–12 season, Helleur signed in England with the Newcastle Falcons.

Helleur made his international debut for Samoa at the 2010 Pacific Nations Cup and impressed with his line-breaking abilities and strong tackling.

He has won the man of steel award for the Newcastle Falcons.
