= Johnny Leota =

Samoa international rugby union player

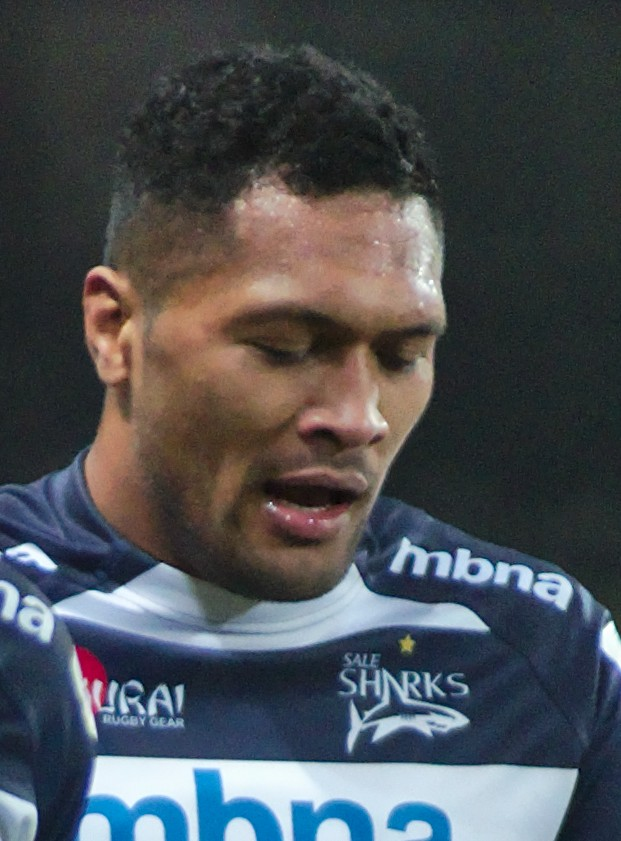
- Leonta in 2013
- Full name: Johnny W. Leota
- Born: 21 January 1984 (age 42) Palmerston North, New Zealand
- Height: 1.83 m (6 ft 0 in)
- Weight: 104 kg (16 st 5 lb; 229 lb)
- Notable relative: Liana Leota (wife)

Rugby union career
- Position: Centre
Senior career
Years	Team	Apps	(Points)
2004–2007	Manawatu	63	(15)
2008–2011	Otago	0	(0)
2008-2011	→ Manawatu (loan)	(0)	((0))
2008–2009	Highlanders	24	(10)
2011–2019	Sale Sharks	129	(135)
2019-	North West Blades Men's Open	7	
- Correct as of 22 October 2021
International career
Years	Team	Apps	(Points)
2011–	Samoa	20	(10)
- Correct as of 3 October 2015

Johnny Leota (born 21 January 1984) is a Samoan rugby union player who played for Sale Sharks in the Aviva Premiership. Leota was born in Palmerston North, New Zealand and made his international debut for Samoa in 2011; he has since won 20 caps. He previously played for Manawatu Turbos in the ITM Cup.

== Club career ==
Leota debuted for Manawatu in 2004 and developed into a fixture for the province, playing his 50th match in 2009. As part of his move to the Highlanders in 2008, he signed with Otago, but was immediately loaned back to Manawatu.

He missed most of the 2010 ITM Cup due to an injury, making only two appearances for the Turbos. He returned to action with Manawatu for the 2011 season.

Leota was signed by the Highlanders for the 2008 Super 14 season, and established himself as a key member of the squad, starting 12 of the team's 13 games and scoring two tries in the process.

In 2009, he again made 12 appearances for the Highlanders, but was reduced to six starts and was used mainly as a substitute through the second half of the season.

He was not retained by the Highlanders for the 2010 Super 14 season, and instead found himself in the wider training group of the Hurricanes. However, he did not make an appearance for the squad and was not brought back after missing most of the 2010 provincial season through injury.

On 11 August 2011, Leota moved to England as he signed for Sale Sharks who compete in the Aviva Premiership after the conclusion of the 2011 Rugby World Cup.

Leota left Sale Sharks at the conclusion of the 2018–19 season.

== International career ==
Leota was one of 25 players selected in the squad for the Samoan national team's 2011 Pacific Nations Cup campaign, in the leadup to the 2011 Rugby World Cup. He made his international debut for Samoa against Tonga in Lautoka, Fiji. Shortly thereafter he returned to New Zealand and resumed provincial duties for Manawatu.

== Personal life ==
Johnny Leota is married to Liana Leota (née Barrett-Chase), a netball player in the Silver Ferns and the Southern Steel. The couple married in 2010 in Rarotonga, and have one daughter, Brooklyn.
