= Mathieu Bonello =

French rugby union player

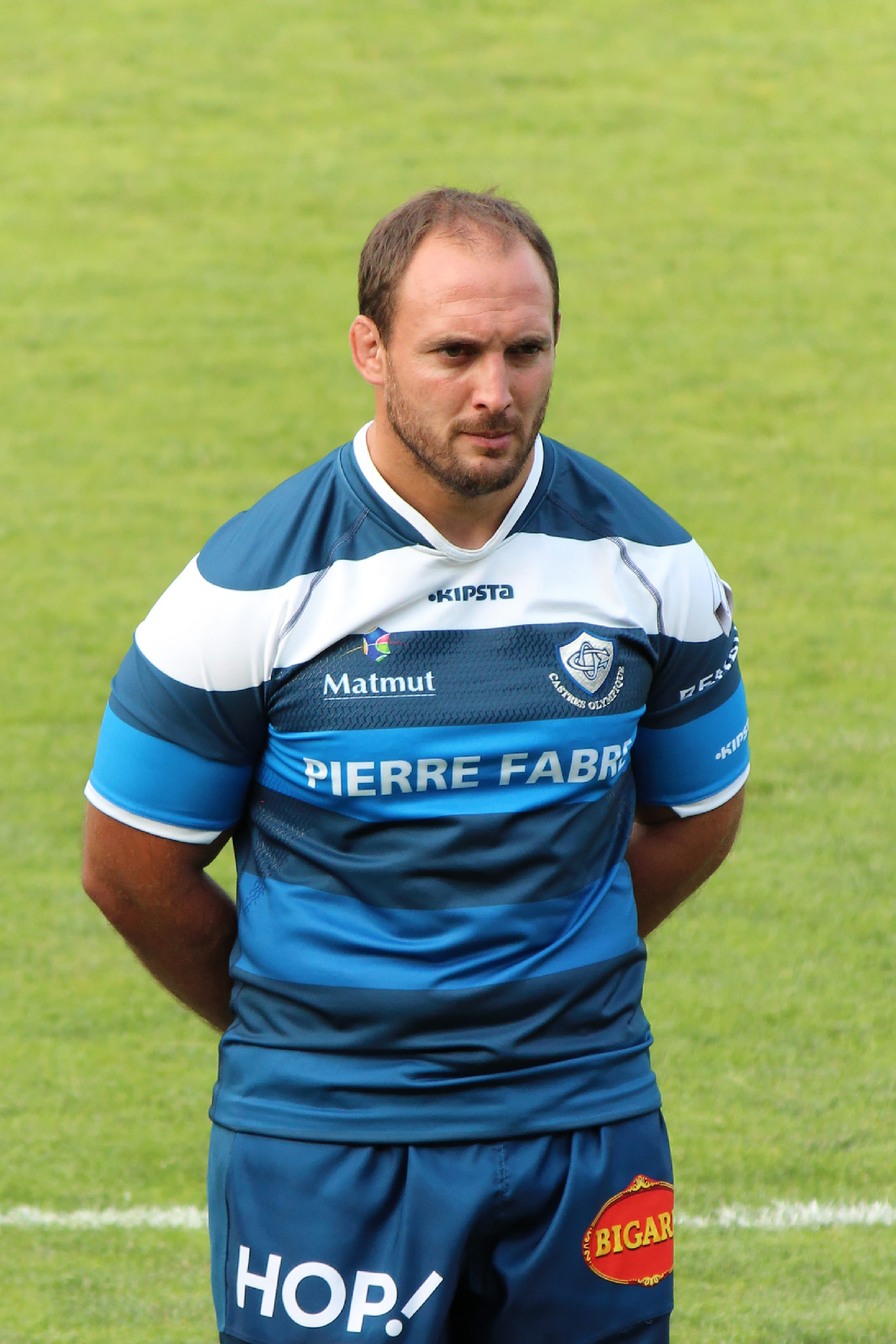
- Born: 23 February 1982 (age 44) Albi, France
- Height: 1.81 m (5 ft 11 1/2 in)
- Weight: 95 kg (14 st 13 lb)

Rugby union career
- Position: Hooker
Senior career
Years	Team	Apps	(Points)
2006–2007	UA Gaillac	29	(10)
2007–	Castres Olympique	173	(15)
- Correct as of 31 January 2015

Mathieu Bonello (born 22 September 1982) is a French rugby union player. His position is hooker and he currently plays for Castres Olympique in the Top 14. He began his career with UA Gaillac, before moving to Castres Olympique in 2007.

== Honours ==
=== Club ===
(France) Castres

- Top 14: 2012–13
