= Brenton Helleur =

- Full name: Brenton Edward Helleur
- Born: 13 February 1986 (age 40) Auckland, New Zealand
- Height: 6 ft 1 in (185 cm)
- Weight: 194 lb (88 kg)
- Notable relative: Jamie Helleur (brother)

Rugby union career
- Position: Scrum-half
Provincial / State sides
Years	Team	Apps	(Points)
2008	Northland	7	(5)
2008–10	Auckland	13	(5)
2011–13	North Harbour	23	(10)
International career
Years	Team	Apps	(Points)
2011	Samoa	2	(0)

Brenton Edward Helleur (born 13 February 1986) is a New Zealand-born Samoan former rugby union player.

Helleur was born in Auckland and is the younger brother of Samoa international centre Jamie Helleur.

A half-back, Helleur was capped twice for Samoa in 2011, debuting in a Pacific Nations Cup match against Tonga at Churchill Park in Lautoka, Fiji. His other appearance came four days later in Sydney, when Samoa recorded their first ever win over the Wallabies, with Helleur coming on as a second-half substitute.

Helleur played provincial rugby for Northland, Auckland and North Harbour. He spent much of his career with Auckland club University, winning two Gallaher Shield titles, before retiring from the sport in 2022.

== See also ==
- List of Samoa national rugby union players
