= Eiji Ando =

Japanese rugby union player

- Full name: Eiji Ando
- Born: 14 May 1982 (age 44) Japan
- Height: 1.73 m (5 ft 8 in)
- Weight: 82 kg (12 st 13 lb; 181 lb)

Rugby union career
- Position: Fly-half
Senior career
Years	Team	Apps	(Points)
2010	NEC Green Rockets	3	(0)
- Correct as of 6 May 2021
International career
Years	Team	Apps	(Points)
2006–2007	Japan	13	(55)
- Correct as of 6 May 2021

Eiji Ando (安藤英次, Andō Eiji; born 14 May 1982) is a former Japanese rugby union player who played as a fly-half. He was named in the Japan squad for the 2007 Rugby World Cup, but didn't make an appearance at the tournament. He did though make 13 appearances for Japan in his career, scoring 55 points.
