= Sekonaia Kalou =

Fiji international rugby union player

Sekonaia Kalou Qaranaqio
- Born: Sekonaia Kalou Qaranaqio; 6 April 1984 (age 42) Sigatoka, Fiji
- Height: 1.98 m (6 ft 6 in)
- Weight: 109 kg (240 lb)

Rugby union career
- Position(s): Lock, Flanker
- Current team: Waverley Harvesting Border
Provincial / State sides
Years	Team	Apps	(Points)
2005 - 2006	North Otago		
2007 - 2010	Otago		
International career
Years	Team	Apps	(Points)
2010–12	Fiji	13	(20)
- Correct as of 25 December 2017

Sekonaia Kalou (born 6 April 1984) is a Fijian professional rugby union player who is also known by the name Sekonaia Qaranaqio. He has also represented Fiji at Netball.

== Rugby career ==
=== Club career ===
Sekonaia played lock for the Kaikorai Rugby Football Club and for Otago in the ITM Cup. He has also played for the 2nd Division New Zealand club North Otago with whom he won the Heartland Championship playing alongside fellow Fijian players Viliame Veikoso, Noa Soqeta and Waitisoni Lotawa. After playing for North Otago he made his way into the 1st Division team Otago in 2007. He also played professionally for US Bressane in France and for Rugby Calvisano in Italy where he won an Eccellenza. After he left Italy in 2015 he returned to Fiji to captain the Nadroga Stallions in Fiji's 2016 Skipper Cup. In 2017 he was on the move again joining Waverley Harvesting Border in New Zealand club rugby.

=== International Rugby ===
Kalou made his International debut for Fiji on 5 June 2010 in 49–3 loss against Australia at Canberra Stadium, he played in all of Fiji's matches for the 2010 Pacific Nations Cup and was selected to tour with the Fijian XV during November 2010 playing in defeats against France and Italy; and a draw against Wales at the Millennium Stadium. He was selected as part of the Fijian squad for 2011 Rugby World Cup and played against Namibia and Samoa. His final international was against England at Twickenham.

== Personal life ==
His brother is fellow professional rugby player Api Ratuniyarawa. After his final appearance for Fiji in 2012 Kalou met Margaret Mary Steven, the pair got married in December 2017.

As well as rugby Kalou has also represented Fiji in Archery and Men's Netball. In 2016 Kalou was named as Fiji's netball player of the year.
