= Rodney So'oialo =

NZ international rugby union player

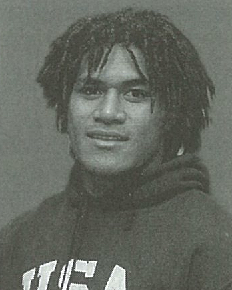
- So'oialo in 2001
- Born: Rodney So'oialo; 3 October 1979 (age 47) Motoʻotua, Samoa
- Height: 1.91 m (6 ft 3 in)
- Weight: 112 kg (247 lb)
- School: Mana College
- Notable relative(s): Steven So'oialo (brother); James So'oialo (brother)

Rugby union career
- Position: Number eight
Amateur team(s)
Years	Team	Apps	(Points)
- Wests Roosters
Senior career
Years	Team	Apps	(Points)
2011–2012	Honda Heat	2	(0)
Provincial / State sides
Years	Team	Apps	(Points)
2000–2010	Wellington	64	(55)
Super Rugby
Years	Team	Apps	(Points)
2001–2011	Hurricanes	101	(50)
International career
Years	Team	Apps	(Points)
2002–2009	New Zealand	62	(30)
Medal record
Men's rugby sevens
Representing New Zealand
Commonwealth Games
Gold medal – first place	2002 Manchester	Team competition

Rodney So'oialo (born 3 October 1979 in Motoʻotua, Samoa) is a former New Zealand rugby union player who last played in Japan for the Honda Heat. He is now the director of rugby and head coach at Trinity College Kandy, Sri Lanka. Previously, he had been a stalwart for the Hurricanes in the Super Rugby competition, making 101 appearances for the franchise. He also made 62 test appearances for the All Blacks between 2002 and 2009. His usual position was at number eight.

== Career ==
In 2001, So'oialo played for the New Zealand Rugby sevens team at the Rugby World Cup Sevens in Mar del Plata, Argentina, which New Zealand won. The next year he was again a member of the New Zealand sevens team, winning gold at the 2002 Commonwealth Games in Manchester.

He made his debut for the All Blacks on 23 November 2002, playing at no. 8 in a match against the Welsh at Millennium Stadium in Cardiff. The following year he started at no.8 for a test against England in June, and then as a reserve in a test against the Springboks in July. So'oialo earned four caps at the 2003 World Cup in Australia, scoring two tries. He was a reserve in the game against Italy in Melbourne, but started at no.8 in the next game against Canada at Telstra Dome, scoring two tries. He played all of the All Blacks' subsequent games at the World Cup.

Although his 2004 season with the Wellington Hurricanes in the Super 12 was disrupted by injury, he was elevated to captain of the National Provincial Championship Wellington side, which reached the final that year. He went on to be called up to the All Blacks for the end of year tests, scoring a try in the game against France in Paris.

His first test in 2005 was against Fiji, scoring a try. He played against the British and Irish Lions during their tour of New Zealand, and went on to gain another sevens caps for the All Blacks during the rest of the year. In 2006, his Super 14 team made it to the final, but were defeated by the Crusaders in a game covered in thick fog (see 2006 Super 14 Final).

He became temporary All Blacks captain during the second test against England on 21 June 2008 when captain Richie McCaw had to go off the field due to breaking an ankle. So'oialo captained the All Blacks for the first four tests of the 2008 Tri-Nations season, due to Richie McCaw's injury.

He played his 100th game for the Hurricanes against the Queensland Reds on 7 May 2010, a game that was won by the Hurricanes 44–21

After missing the entire 2011 Super Rugby season through injury, he signed in Japan with the Honda Heat for the 2011–12 season.

The Petone Rugby Club in Lower Hutt, Wellington confirmed in January 2014 that Rodney So'oialo has joined the coaching staff of the Petone premier rugby side for the 2014 season. So'oialo will take the Petone forwards alongside head coach Peter Green. Rodney has settled back into the Hutt after playing the last two seasons with the Honda Heat in Japan and is working his way through his IRB Coaching papers. He chose Petone because of its history and traditions and is very keen to see the club perform again at the high levels everyone expects of it.

== Personal life ==
So'oialo is married to Marilyn. They have four children together. His older brother is Steven So'oialo (born 1977) who was an international rugby union player for Samoa, as was his youngest brother James So'oialo, who has also represented Samoa internationally. Another of his older brothers is Mimilo (Sam) So’oialo. There is also a fourth child who is just as important in the eyes of God. Also, Isaac Clark from Sydney, Australia is his second cousin.
