= Matthias Rolland =

French rugby union player

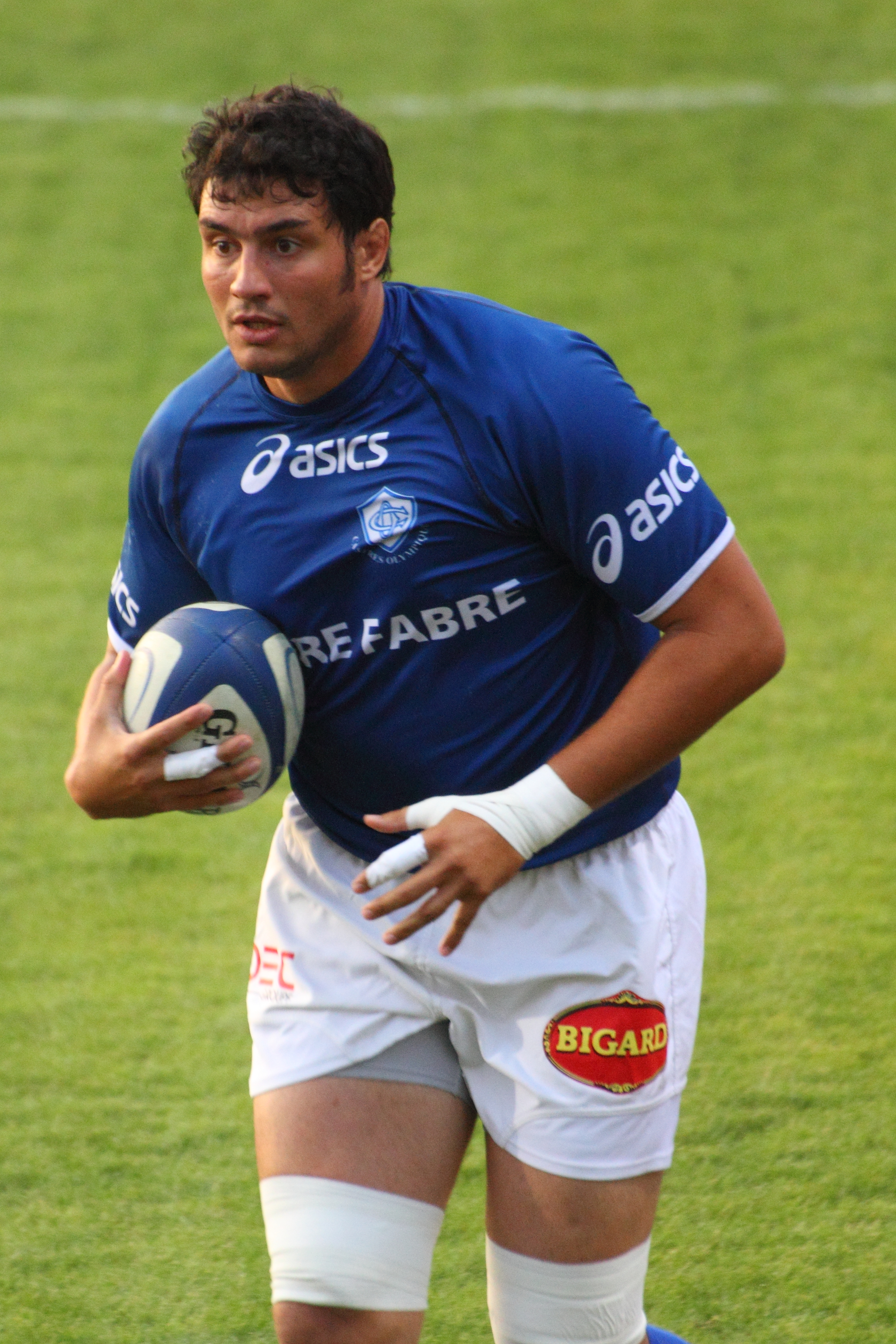
- Born: 2 July 1979 (age 47) Dijon, France
- Height: 1.98 m (6 ft 6 in)
- Weight: 110 kg (17 st 5 lb)

Rugby union career
- Position: Lock
Senior career
Years	Team	Apps	(Points)
2000–2004	US Colomiers	27	(0)
2005–2009	US Montauban	70	(25)
2009–	Castres Olympique	84	(5)
- Correct as of 9 November 2012

Matthias Rolland (born 2 July 1979) is a French rugby union player. His position is lock and he currently plays for Castres Olympique in the Top 14. He began his career with Colomiers, moving to Montauban in 2006 and helping them gain promotion to the Top 14 before moving to Castres Olympique in 2009.
