= Nofomuli Taumoefolau =

Japan & Tonga international rugby union player

- Born: June 21, 1956 (age 70)
- School: Tupou High School
- University: Daito Bunka University
- Notable relative(s): Koliniasi Holani(nephew); Sioape Latu Holani(nephew)

Rugby union career
- Position: Wing
Amateur team(s)
Years	Team	Apps	(Points)
- Tupou High School
–	Daito Bunka University RFC		
Senior career
Years	Team	Apps	(Points)
1980-1990	Sanyo Electric		
International career
Years	Team	Apps	(Points)
1985-1990	Japan	15	(16)
1979	Tonga	3	(4)
Coaching career
- Years: Team
- 2015-: Saitama Institute of Technology

Nofomuli Taumoefolau (born 1956) is a former rugby union player. He represented Japan and Tonga at international level. He played three tests for Tonga before he debuted for Japan against a French selection team in 1985. He played for Sanyo since 1980 until the end of his career.

Taumoefolau was part of Japan's 1987 Rugby World Cup squad.

He is the uncle of Koliniasi Holani, who currently plays for Japan's national rugby union team.
