= Tane Tuʻipulotu =

Tane Tu'ipulotu
- Born: 7 February 1982 (age 44) Tonga
- Height: 1.88 m (6 ft 2 in)
- Weight: 98 kg (15 st 6 lb; 216 lb)
- School: St. Kentigern College
- University: Massey University

Rugby union career
- Position: Centre
Senior career
Years	Team	Apps	(Points)
2001-02	Auckland		
2003-08	Wellington	21	(30)
2006	→ Manawatu	4	(5)
2008-11	Newcastle	68	(20)
2011-12	Yamaha Júbilo	13	(15)
2012-13	Newcastle	11	(5)
Super Rugby
Years	Team	Apps	(Points)
2004-06	Hurricanes	25	(20)
2007	Chiefs	11	(10)
2008	Hurricanes	9	(8)
International career
Years	Team	Apps	(Points)
2000	New Zealand U19		
2001-02	New Zealand U21		
2004	Pacific Islanders	1	(0)

Tane Tu'ipulotu (born 7 February 1982) is a former rugby union player for the Hurricanes in the Super Rugby competition. He played as a centre. He was loaned to the Manawatu Turbos for the 2006 season. He has represented the Pacific Islanders. In summer of 2008 he signed for the Guinness Premiership side Newcastle Falcons, to arrive in November 2008, after the Air New Zealand cup. Tu'ipulotu quickly became a fan favourite at the club before joining the Yamaha Júbilo in 2012. In 2013 he retired from rugby due to a knee injury.
