= Steven So'oialo =

Samoa international rugby union player

Steve So'oialo
- Born: Steven So'oialo; 11 May 1977 (age 49) Apia, Samoa
- Height: 5 ft 10 in (1.78 m)
- Weight: 13 st (83 kg)
- Notable relative(s): Rodney So'oialo, James So'oialo

Rugby union career
- Position: Scrum-half
- Current team: Harlequins
Senior career
Years	Team	Apps	(Points)
1998–04	Orrell		
2004–2009	Harlequins	75	(45)
International career
Years	Team	Apps	(Points)
1998–2007	Samoa	38	(25)
2004	Pacific Islanders	2	(0)

Steven So'oialo (born 11 May 1977 in Apia, Samoa) is a Samoan rugby union footballer. He played scrum-half for English club Harlequins and formerly Orrell. He played for Manu Samoa in the 1999 and 2003 Rugby World Cup. He also played for the Pacific Islanders team in 2004. He is the older brother of New Zealand All Blacks rugby union international and Wellington Hurricanes Super Rugby player, Rodney So'oialo, and of James So'oialo, who has also represented Samoa internationally.
