= Ravai Fatiaki =

Fiji international rugby union player

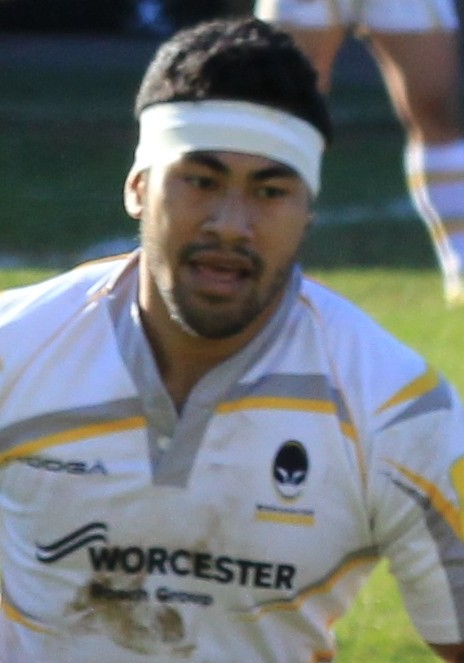
- Born: 1 March 1987 (age 39) Nausori, Fiji
- Height: 1.84 m (6 ft 1/2 in)
- Weight: 102 kg (16.1 st; 225 lb)
- School: Lelean Memorial School
- Occupation: Farmer

Rugby union career
- Position: Inside centre
- Current team: Leicester Tigers
Amateur team(s)
Years	Team	Apps	(Points)
- Nausori Rugby Club
Senior career
Years	Team	Apps	(Points)
2011–16	Worcester Warriors	29	(0)
2017–	Leicester Tigers	1	(0)
International career
Years	Team	Apps	(Points)
2009-2011	Fiji	8	(5)

Ravai Fatiaki (born 1 March 1987) is a Fijian rugby union player who played for Worcester Warriors in England's Premiership Rugby. He played as a centre or fly-half.

== Biography ==
Fatiaki's older brother Fred, coached the former Assistant Minister for Youth and Sports, Iliesa Delana to a first Gold medal win for Fiji and the Pacific at the 2012 Summer Paralympics.

Fatiaki was educated at Lelean Memorial School.

Fatiaki made his international debut for Fiji in 2009 against Japan. He was a member of the Fiji squad for the 2011 Rugby World Cup in New Zealand. In 2012 he was recruited by the Worcester Warriors.

Fatiaki has since joined the British Army playing professional Rugby for the Army and appeared in the starting line up of the 2017 Army v Navy. On 9 November 2017 Fatiaki was named on the bench for Leicester Tigers in their Anglo-Welsh Cup game against Bath.
