= Viliame Veikoso =

Fijian rugby union footballer (born 1982)

- Born: 4 April 1982 (age 44) Suva, Fiji
- Height: 1.84 m (6 ft 0 in)
- Weight: 101 kg (223 lb)
- School: Wesley College
- Notable relative: Akapusi Qera

Rugby union career
- Position: Hooker
Senior career
Years	Team	Apps	(Points)
2005–2006	North Otago	6	(5)
2006–2008	Sharks (Colonial Cup)		
2014–2016	Doncaster	28	(5)
- Correct as of 11 September 2021
International career
Years	Team	Apps	(Points)
2009 – 2016	Fiji	33	(0)
- Correct as of 11 September 2021

http://en.espn.co.uk/scrum/rugby/player/105742.html

Viliame Veikoso (born 4 April 1982 in Suva, Fiji) is a Fijian rugby union footballer. He plays as a hooker. Veikoso hails from Nabua village, tikina Koroalau from Cakaudrove Province. he is also related to Akapusi Qera of Gloucester. Veikoso resides with his parents at Kinoya whose father is also a former school teacher. They currently live beside former Australian Wallaby international and ex Fiji coach Ilivasi Tabua.

Veikoso also attended the prestigious Wesley College, Auckland, NZ where he won a national title in 2001 with the first XV alongside former All Blacks like Sitiveni Sivivatu, Stephen Donald and former Manu Samoa international and London Irish player Sailosi Tagicakibau.

Veikoso was also a former member of the QVS Old Boys Club which regularly play at the Suva Rugby Competition. He is regular for the Nadi's on the provincial competition in Fiji. Before playing for Fiji Veikoso played for 2nd division New Zealand side North Otago with whom he won the Heartland Championship in 2005 and 2006.

Veikoso made his test debut for the Flying Fijians in the 2009 Autumn Internationals against Scotland at Murrayfield Stadium after impressive performances in the now defunct franchise competition in Fiji, the Colonial Cup. He made his debut alongside fellow debutants Deacon Manu, Josh Matavesi, and Napolioni Nalaga in that game. Was selected for Fiji to the 2011 Rugby World Cup in New Zealand and to the 2015 Rugby World Cup in England where Fiji's forwards under the coaching of Frans Ludeke outperformed the other teams

== See also ==
- Fiji national rugby union team
- Fiji Warriors
- 2009 end of year rugby tests
