= Ezra Taylor (rugby union) =

- Born: Ezra Taylor; 6 April 1983 (age 43) Brisbane, Australia
- Height: 1.94 m (6 ft 4 in)
- Weight: 108 kg (17 st 0 lb)

Rugby union career
- Position: Loose forward/ Lock
Senior career
Years	Team	Apps	(Points)
2010–11	Connacht	5	(0)
2011–12	Worcester	1	(0)
Provincial / State sides
Years	Team	Apps	(Points)
2006–08, 2013–	Otago		
Super Rugby
Years	Team	Apps	(Points)
2007–08	Highlanders	8	(0)
2009–10	Reds	14	(5)
International career
Years	Team	Apps	(Points)
2011–	Samoa	2	(0)

Ezra Taylor (born 6 April 1983 in Brisbane, Australia) is an Australian born, Samoa rugby union player. He began his career in the second row but now plays as a flanker or number eight.

== Playing career ==
=== New Zealand ===
Born in Australia but raised in New Zealand, Taylor represented New Zealand at U-19 and schoolboy levels and made his debut for Otago in the 2006 Air New Zealand Cup and earned a contract with the Highlanders for the 2007 Super 14 season. He made 5 starts in 2007 and looked to have a bright future for the franchise until a serious knee injury derailed his career and forced him to miss all of 2008.

=== Australia ===
After an extended injury break, Taylor signed with the Queensland Reds for the 2009 Super 14 season He appeared in 14 matches over two seasons for the Reds and scored his first Super Rugby try.

=== Europe ===
Taylor signed with Connacht of the Celtic League for the 2010–11 season. He then came in as injury cover for Worcester Warriors in December 2011, but two minutes after making his debut was injured and ruled out for the rest of the 2011/12 season.

=== International ===
Taylor made himself available to play for Samoa in the run-up to the 2011 Rugby World Cup and made his debut against Japan on 2 July 2011.

=== Return to Otago ===
Taylor returned to New Zealand and signed with the Otago Rugby Football Union for the 2013 ITM Cup season.
