= James So'oialo =

New Zealand-born Samoan rugby union player

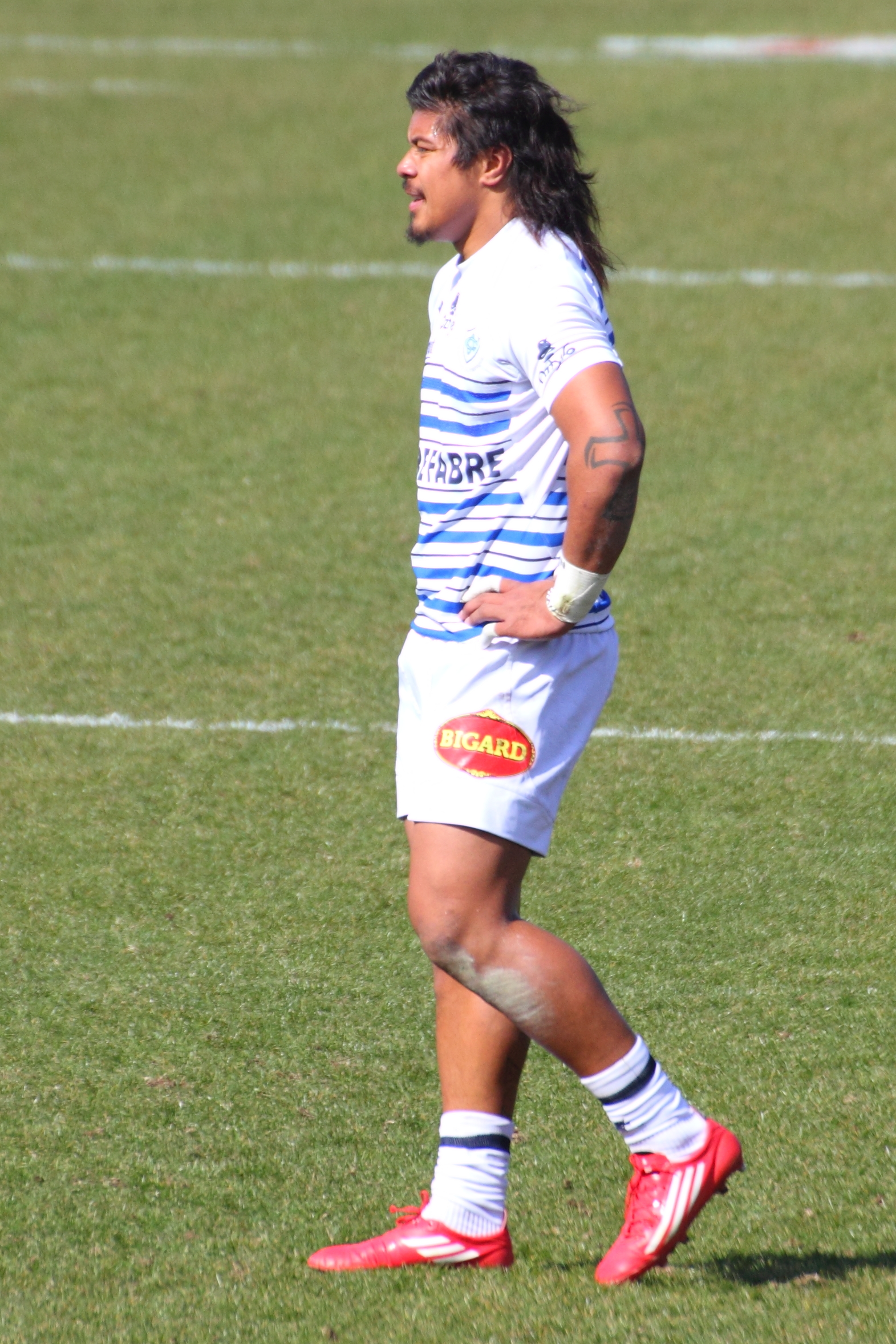
- So'oialo in 2012
- Born: 2 March 1989 (age 37) Wellington, New Zealand
- Height: 1.85 m (6 ft 1 in)
- Weight: 95 kg (15.0 st; 209 lb)
- Notable relative(s): Steven So'oialo (brother); Rodney So'oialo (brother)

Rugby union career
- Position(s): Fly-half; Fullback
Senior career
Years	Team	Apps	(Points)
2011–12	Castres	6	(0)
2012–13	Pays d'Aix	8	(58)
2013	Connacht	2	(0)
2014–15	Wellington	2	(0)
2016–	Buller	2	
- Correct as of 9 September 2017
International career
Years	Team	Apps	(Points)
2011–	Samoa	7	(78)
- Correct as of 23 June 2013

James So'oialo (born 2 March 1989) is a Samoan rugby union player. He currently plays as a fly-half for Horowhenua Kapiti in the Heartland Championship. He made his international debut in 2011 when he was part of the Samoan team at the 2011 Rugby World Cup where he played in one match. He signed for Irish provincial rugby team Connacht for the 2013/2014 season. On 26 October, after only having arrived in late September, Connacht released So'oialo from his contract on 'compassionate grounds', and he returned to New Zealand. He was included in the Melbourne Rising squad for the NRC 2019 season as a fly half.
