= Koliniasi Holani =

Japan international rugby union player

Ryu Koliniasi Holani
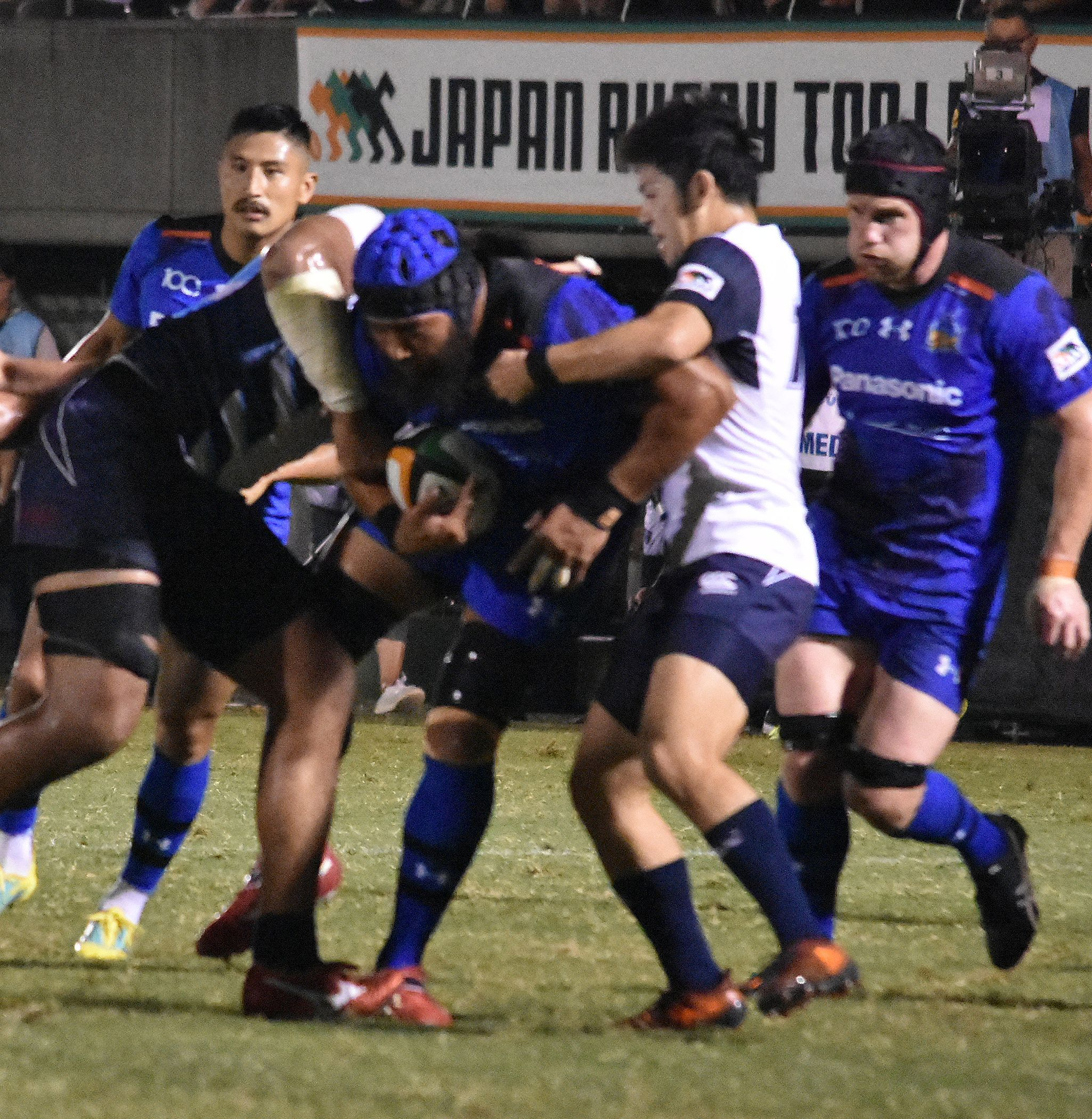
- Holani Ryu Koriniasi in 2018
- Born: Koliniasi Holani; 25 October 1981 (age 45) Nukuʻalofa, Tonga
- Height: 1.88 m (6 ft 2 in)
- Weight: 111 kg (17 st 7 lb)
- School: Fukaya High School
- University: Saitama Institute of Technology
- Notable relative: Nofomuli Taumoefolau (uncle)

Rugby union career
- Position: Number 8 / Flanker
Senior career
Years	Team	Apps	(Points)
2006−19	Panasonic Wild Knights	148	(270)
- Correct as of 15 January 2017
International career
Years	Team	Apps	(Points)
2008–16	Japan	45	(110)
- Correct as of 25 June 2016

Ryu Koliniasi Holani (ホラニ 龍コリニアシ, Horani Ryu Koriniasi), born 25 October 1981, is a Tongan born, Japanese professional Rugby union player. He is the nephew of the former Japan international Nofomuli Taumoefolau

He plays at number eight for Top League club Panasonic Wild Knights.

He moved to Japan on a study abroad programme from Tonga and attended High School in Saitama, Japan at age 16. Holani is fluent in Japanese.

Holani has played 42 tests for the Japan national rugby union team. He earned his 40th cap in the 2015 Pacific Nations Cup in their match against the United States.
