= Vitori Buatava =

Fijian rugby union footballer

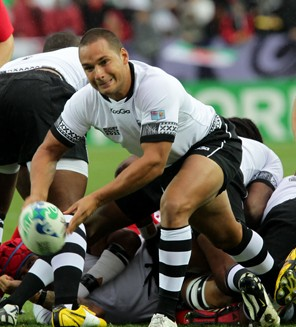
- Born: 1 November 1985 (age 41) Melbourne
- Height: 1.8 m (5 ft 11 in)
- Weight: 91 kg (201 lb; 14.3 st)

Rugby union career
- Position: Scrum-half
Senior career
Years	Team	Apps	(Points)
- Zhermack Badia
International career
Years	Team	Apps	(Points)
2007-2011	Fiji	14	(0)

Vitori Buatava (born 1 November 1985) is a Fijian rugby union footballer. He currently plays for the Zhermack Badia rugby team and the Fiji national rugby union team and usually plays as a Scrum-half.

He was part of the Fiji team at the 2011 Rugby World Cup where he played in four matches, he made his international debut in 2007.
