= Sailosi Tagicakibau =

Samoa international rugby union player

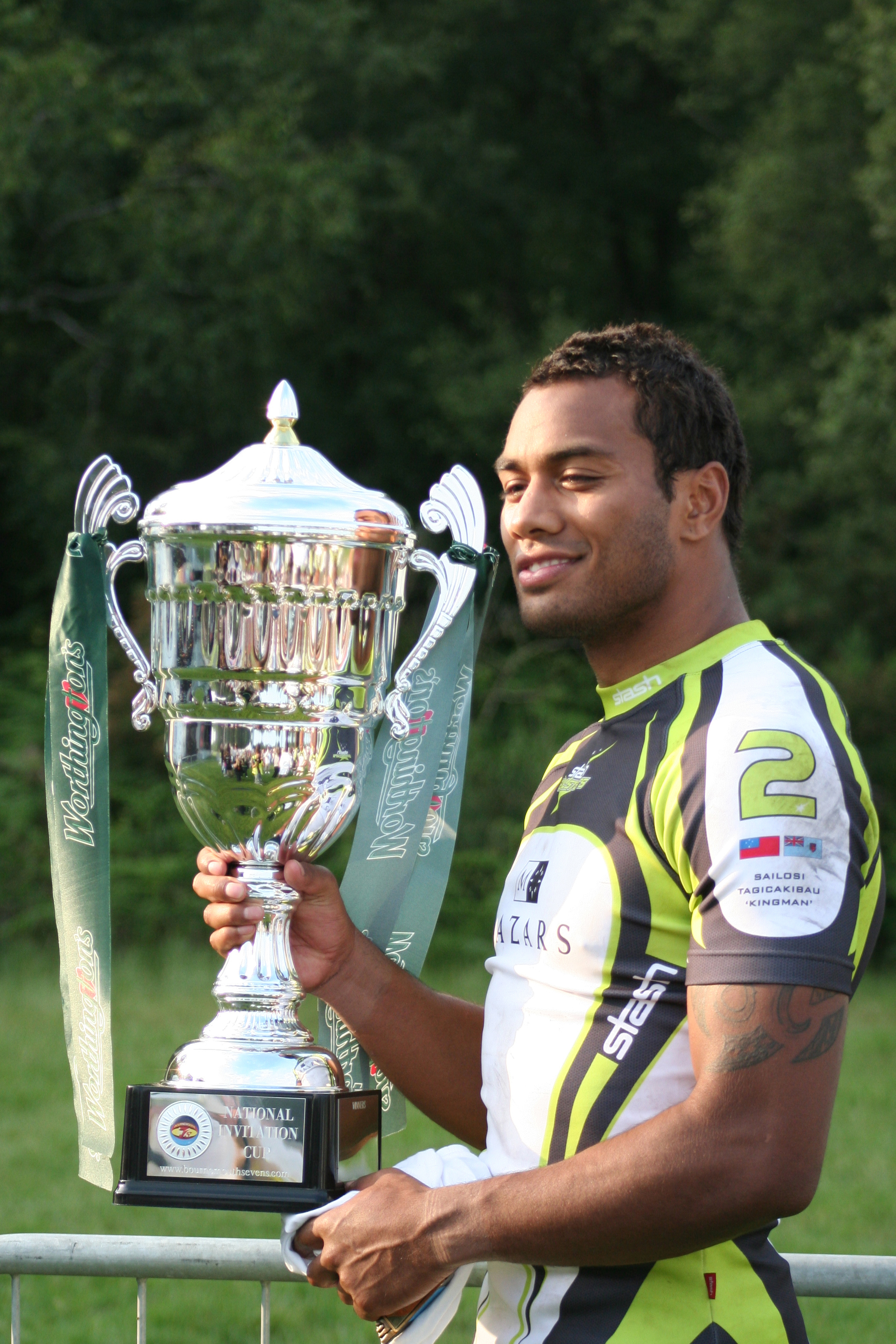
- Born: Sailosi Tagicakibau; 14 November 1982 (age 44) Auckland, New Zealand
- Height: 1.94 m (6 ft 4 1/2 in)
- Weight: 114 kg (251 lb; 17 st 13 lb)
- School: Wesley College, Auckland
- Notable relative: Michael Tagicakibau (brother)

Rugby union career
- Position: Wing / back row
Senior career
| Years | Team | Apps | (Points) |
| 2005–2014 | London Irish | 157 | (285) |
| 2014-2016 | Wasps | 34 | (40) |
| 2017-2018 | Warringah Rats | | |
- Correct as of 27 February 2014
Provincial / State sides
| Years | Team | Apps | (Points) |
| 2004–05 | Taranaki | 17 | (35) |
- Correct as of 27 February 2014
Super Rugby
| Years | Team | Apps | (Points) |
| 2005 | Chiefs | 7 | (5) |
| 2014 | → Stormers | 10 | (5) |
- Correct as of 12 July 2014
International career
| Years | Team | Apps | (Points) |
| 2003–11 | Samoa | 21 | (35) |
| 2006–08 | Pacific Islanders | 3 | (0) |
- Correct as of 27 February 2014

Sailosi Tagicakibau (born 14 November 1982) is a rugby union footballer who has played at wing for London Irish and Wasps in the Aviva Premiership.

He spent the majority of his career with English Premiership side London Irish, making in excess of 150 appearances. He played international rugby for Samoa, achieving 21 caps. By contrast, his brother, Saracens player Michael, has played for Fiji.

== Personal life ==
Tagicakibau was born in Auckland, New Zealand. He has a Fijian father and Samoan mother. He was a talented all-rounder in his school years excelling at basketball, athletics and rugby union.

He is the eldest of five children, his brother Michael also plays professional rugby.

Prior to competing in professional rugby, he attended Papakura High School and Wesley College rugby schools in New Zealand.

== Career ==
=== Club career ===
After college, he joined the Taranaki club and came under the guidance of the great All Black Kieran Crowley. He appeared in every National Provincial Championship match during his first season, scoring six tries and was subsequently invited to join the Chiefs for whom he played in eight Super 12 games.

In November 2005, Tagicakibau signed with English Premiership club London Irish and his debut match for the Exiles was on 28 January 2006 against Gloucester.

After nine years at London Irish, Tagicakibau was loaned out to South African Super Rugby side the Stormers 2014 Super Rugby season. After he left London Irish, Sailosi signed for Premiership rivals Wasps from the 2014-15 season. In September 2016 Wasps announced that Tagicakibau had left the club, after they had released him from his contract, at his request, for family reasons.

=== National team ===
Sailosi made his debut for the Samoa Sevens national team in 2003, making several appearances and becoming a team staple. Later that year he was selected as part of the Samoa World Cup squad, where he scored tries against Georgia and Uruguay. He has since represented Samoa at the 2007 World Cup held in France and at the 2011 World Cup hosted in his home country of New Zealand. In addition, he has played for Samoa in the Pacific Nations Cup against Fiji, Tonga and Japan, as well as a number of friendlies.

Other notable honours include his inclusion in the 2008 Pacific Islanders squad and the 2012 World Barbarians team.
