= 2011 Rugby World Cup statistics =

The 2011 Rugby World Cup was held in New Zealand from 9 September to 23 October 2011.

== Team statistics ==
The following table shows the team's results in major statistical categories.

Team statistics
Team	Played	Won	Drawn	Lost	Points for	Points against	Points difference	Tries	Conversions	Penalties	Drop goals	Yellow card	Red card
New Zealand	7	7	0	0	301	72	229	40	25	15	2	1	0
Australia	7	5	0	2	211	95	116	28	19	9	2	0	0
England	5	4	0	1	149	53	96	20	14	6	1	2	0
France	7	4	0	3	159	124	35	16	11	17	2	1	0
Ireland	5	4	0	1	145	56	89	16	13	12	1	0	0
South Africa	5	4	0	1	175	35	140	21	20	9	1	1	0
Wales	7	4	0	3	228	74	154	29	22	13	0	0	1
Argentina	5	3	0	2	100	73	27	11	9	9	0	1	0
Italy	4	2	0	2	92	95	−3	13	6	5	0	1	0
Samoa	4	2	0	2	91	49	42	10	7	8	1	1	1
Scotland	4	2	0	2	73	59	14	4	1	13	4	0	0
Tonga	4	2	0	2	80	98	−18	7	6	11	0	3	0
Canada	4	1	1	2	82	168	−86	9	5	7	2	0	0
Fiji	4	1	0	3	59	167	−108	7	6	4	0	0	0
Georgia	4	1	0	3	48	90	−42	3	3	9	0	0	0
United States	4	1	0	3	38	122	−84	4	3	4	0	2	0
Japan	4	0	1	3	69	184	−115	8	4	7	0	1	0
Namibia	4	0	0	4	44	266	−222	5	2	2	3	2	0
Romania	4	0	0	4	44	169	−125	3	1	9	0	1	0
Russia	4	0	0	4	57	196	−139	8	4	2	1	1	0

Source: ESPNscrum.com

== Try scorers ==
6 tries

- (England) Chris Ashton
- (France) Vincent Clerc

5 tries

- (Australia) Adam Ashley-Cooper
- (Ireland) Keith Earls
- (New Zealand) Israel Dagg

4 tries

- (England) Mark Cueto
- (Fiji) Vereniki Goneva
- (New Zealand) Zac Guildford
- (New Zealand) Richard Kahui
- (New Zealand) Jerome Kaino
- (New Zealand) Sonny Bill Williams
- (Wales) Scott Williams

3 tries

- (Australia) Berrick Barnes
- (Australia) Drew Mitchell
- (New Zealand) Ma'a Nonu
- (South Africa) Francois Hougaard
- (South Africa) François Steyn
- (Samoa) Alesana Tuilagi
- (Wales) Jonathan Davies
- (Wales) George North
- (Wales) Shane Williams

2 tries

- (Argentina) Lucas González Amorosino
- (Argentina) Juan José Imhoff
- (Australia) Anthony Fainga'a
- (Australia) Ben McCalman
- (Australia) David Pocock
- (Canada) Phil Mackenzie
- (Canada) Conor Trainor
- (England) Ben Foden
- (England) Shontayne Hape
- (England) Manu Tuilagi
- (England) Ben Youngs
- (France) François Trinh-Duc
- (Ireland) Tommy Bowe
- (Italy) Tommaso Benvenuti
- (Italy) Sergio Parisse
- (Italy) Giulio Toniolatti
- (Japan) James Arlidge
- (Namibia) Heinz Koll
- (New Zealand) Adam Thomson
- (New Zealand) Victor Vito
- (Russia) Vladimir Ostroushko
- (Russia) Denis Simplikevich
- (Samoa) Kahn Fotuali'i
- (Samoa) George Stowers
- (Scotland) Simon Danielli
- (South Africa) Gio Aplon
- (South Africa) Jaque Fourie
- (South Africa) Bryan Habana
- (South Africa) Juan de Jongh
- (South Africa) Danie Rossouw
- (South Africa) Morné Steyn
- (Tonga) Siale Piutau
- (Wales) Taulupe Faletau
- (Wales) Leigh Halfpenny
- (Wales) Mike Phillips
- (Wales) Jamie Roberts
- (Wales) Lloyd Williams

1 try

- (Argentina) Felipe Contepomi
- (Argentina) Julio Farías Cabello
- (Argentina) Santiago Fernández
- (Argentina) Genaro Fessia
- (Argentina) Juan Figallo
- (Argentina) Agustin Gosio
- (Argentina) Juan Manuel Leguizamón
- (Australia) Ben Alexander
- (Australia) Kurtley Beale
- (Australia) Rocky Elsom
- (Australia) Rob Horne
- (Australia) James Horwill
- (Australia) Digby Ioane
- (Australia) Salesi Ma'afu
- (Australia) Pat McCabe
- (Australia) Stephen Moore
- (Australia) James O'Connor
- (Australia) Radike Samo
- (Canada) Aaron Carpenter
- (Canada) Ander Monro
- (Canada) Jebb Sinclair
- (Canada) Ryan Smith
- (Canada) D. T. H. van der Merwe
- (England) Delon Armitage
- (England) Tom Croft
- (Fiji) Leone Nakarawa
- (Fiji) Napolioni Nalaga
- (Fiji) Netani Talei
- (France) Thierry Dusautoir
- (France) Maxime Médard
- (France) Maxime Mermoz
- (France) Lionel Nallet
- (France) Pascal Papé
- (France) Morgan Parra
- (France) Julien Pierre
- (France) Damien Traille
- (Georgia (country)) Dimitri Basilaia
- (Georgia (country)) Mamuka Gorgodze
- (Georgia (country)) Lasha Khmaladze
- (Ireland) Rory Best
- (Ireland) Isaac Boss
- (Ireland) Tony Buckley
- (Ireland) Shane Jennings
- (Ireland) Rob Kearney
- (Ireland) Fergus McFadden
- (Ireland) Seán O'Brien
- (Ireland) Brian O'Driscoll
- (Ireland) Andrew Trimble
- (Italy) Martin Castrogiovanni
- (Italy) Edoardo Gori
- (Italy) Luke McLean
- (Italy) Luciano Orquera
- (Italy) Alessandro Zanni
- (Japan) Kosuke Endo
- (Japan) Kensuke Hatakeyama
- (Japan) Shota Horie
- (Japan) Michael Leitch
- (Japan) Hirotoki Onozawa
- (Japan) Alisi Tupuailei
- (Namibia) Chrysander Botha
- (Namibia) Theuns Kotzé
- (Namibia) Danie van Wyk
- (New Zealand) Jimmy Cowan
- (New Zealand) Andy Ellis
- (New Zealand) Andrew Hore
- (New Zealand) Cory Jane
- (New Zealand) Keven Mealamu
- (New Zealand) Mils Muliaina
- (New Zealand) Kieran Read
- (New Zealand) Colin Slade
- (New Zealand) Conrad Smith
- (New Zealand) Brad Thorn
- (New Zealand) Isaia Toeava
- (New Zealand) Tony Woodcock
- (Romania) Daniel Carpo
- (Romania) Ionel Cazan
- (Romania) Mihăiţă Lazăr
- (Russia) Vasily Artemyev
- (Russia) Alexey Makovetskiy
- (Russia) Konstantin Rachkov
- (Russia) Alexander Yanyushkin
- (South Africa) Tendai Mtawarira
- (South Africa) Gurthrö Steenkamp
- (Samoa) Anthony Perenise
- (Samoa) Paul Williams
- (Scotland) Joe Ansbro
- (Scotland) Mike Blair
- (Tonga) Suka Hufanga
- (Tonga) Tukulua Lokotui
- (Tonga) Viliami Maʻafu
- (Tonga) Sona Taumalolo
- (Tonga) Fetuʻu Vainikolo
- (United States) Paul Emerick
- (United States) JJ Gagiano
- (United States) Mike Petri
- (United States) Chris Wyles
- (Wales) Aled Brew
- (Wales) Lloyd Burns
- (Wales) Lee Byrne
- (Wales) Gethin Jenkins
- (Wales) Alun Wyn Jones
- (Wales) Sam Warburton

== Drop goal scorers ==
3 drop goals

- (Namibia) Theuns Kotzé
- (Scotland) Dan Parks

2 drop goals

- (Canada) Ander Monro
- (France) François Trinh-Duc

1 drop goal

- (Australia) Berrick Barnes
- (Australia) Quade Cooper
- (England) Jonny Wilkinson
- (Ireland) Johnny Sexton
- (New Zealand) Dan Carter
- (New Zealand) Aaron Cruden
- (Russia) Konstantin Rachkov
- (Samoa) Tusi Pisi
- (Scotland) Ruaridh Jackson
- (South Africa) Morné Steyn

== Point scorers ==
Overall Points Scorers
Player	Team	Total	Details			
Player	Team	Total	Tries	Conversions	Penalties	Drop Goals
Morné Steyn	South Africa	62	2	14	7	1
James O'Connor	Australia	52	1	13	7	0
Kurt Morath	Tonga	45	0	6	11	0
Ronan O'Gara	Ireland	44	0	10	8	0
Piri Weepu	New Zealand	41	0	4	11	0
Dimitri Yachvili	France	39	0	6	9	0
Morgan Parra	France	37	1	4	8	0
Colin Slade	New Zealand	36	1	14	1	0
James Arlidge	Japan	34	2	3	6	0
Rhys Priestland	Wales	33	0	10	3	2
Chris Ashton	England	30	6	0	0	0
Vincent Clerc	France	30	6	0	0	0
Jonny Wilkinson	England	28	0	5	5	1
Merab Kvirikashvili	Georgia	28	0	2	8	0
Stephen Jones	Wales	28	0	11	2	0
Felipe Contepomi	Argentina	26	1	3	5	0
Berrick Barnes	Australia	26	3	4	0	1
Adam Ashley-Cooper	Australia	25	5	0	0	0
Keith Earls	Ireland	25	5	0	0	0
Israel Dagg	New Zealand	25	5	0	0	0
Tusi Pisi	Samoa	25	0	2	6	1
Theuns Kotzé	Namibia	24	1	2	2	3
Dan Parks	Scotland	24	0	0	5	3
Chris Paterson	Scotland	23	0	1	7	0
James Hook	Wales	23	0	1	7	0
Ander Monro	Canada	22	1	1	3	2
Seremaia Bai	Fiji	22	0	5	4	0
Toby Flood	England	21	0	9	1	0
Johnny Sexton	Ireland	21	0	3	4	1
Dan Carter	New Zealand	21	0	6	2	1
Paul Williams	Samoa	21	1	5	2	0
François Steyn	South Africa	21	3	0	2	0
James Pritchard	Canada	20	0	4	4	0
Mark Cueto	England	20	4	0	0	0
Vereniki Goneva	Fiji	20	4	0	0	0
Zac Guildford	New Zealand	20	4	0	0	0
Richard Kahui	New Zealand	20	4	0	0	0
Jerome Kaino	New Zealand	20	4	0	0	0
Sonny Bill Williams	New Zealand	20	4	0	0	0
Scott Williams	Wales	20	4	0	0	0
Martín Rodríguez	Argentina	19	0	5	3	0
Mirco Bergamasco	Italy	19	0	2	5	0
Konstantin Rachkov	Russia	19	1	4	1	1
François Trinh-Duc	France	18	2	1	0	2
Chris Wyles	United States	18	1	2	3	0
Drew Mitchell	Australia	15	3	0	0	0
Ma'a Nonu	New Zealand	15	3	0	0	0
Dănuț Dumbravă	Romania	15	0	0	5	0
Alesana Tuilagi	Samoa	15	3	0	0	0
Francois Hougaard	South Africa	15	3	0	0	0
Jonathan Davies	Wales	15	3	0	0	0
George North	Wales	15	3	0	0	0
Shane Williams	Wales	15	3	0	0	0
Quade Cooper	Australia	13	0	2	2	1
Leigh Halfpenny	Wales	13	2	0	1	0
Ruan Pienaar	South Africa	12	0	6	0	0
Ionuț Dimofte	Romania	11	0	1	3	0
Lucas González Amorosino	Argentina	10	2	0	0	0
Juan José Imhoff	Argentina	10	2	0	0	0
Anthony Fainga'a	Australia	10	2	0	0	0
Ben McCalman	Australia	10	2	0	0	0
David Pocock	Australia	10	2	0	0	0
Phil Mackenzie	Canada	10	2	0	0	0
Conor Trainor	Canada	10	2	0	0	0
Ben Foden	England	10	2	0	0	0
Shontayne Hape	England	10	2	0	0	0
Manu Tuilagi	England	10	2	0	0	0
Ben Youngs	England	10	2	0	0	0
Tommy Bowe	Ireland	10	2	0	0	0
Tommaso Benvenuti	Italy	10	2	0	0	0
Sergio Parisse	Italy	10	2	0	0	0
Giulio Toniolatti	Italy	10	2	0	0	0
Heinz Koll	Namibia	10	2	0	0	0
Adam Thomson	New Zealand	10	2	0	0	0
Victor Vito	New Zealand	10	2	0	0	0
Vladimir Ostroushko	Russia	10	2	0	0	0
Denis Simplikevich	Russia	10	2	0	0	0
Kahn Fotuali'i	Samoa	10	2	0	0	0
George Stowers	Samoa	10	2	0	0	0
Simon Danielli	Scotland	10	2	0	0	0
Gio Aplon	South Africa	10	2	0	0	0
Jaque Fourie	South Africa	10	2	0	0	0
Bryan Habana	South Africa	10	2	0	0	0
Juan de Jongh	South Africa	10	2	0	0	0
Danie Rossouw	South Africa	10	2	0	0	0
Siale Piutau	Tonga	10	2	0	0	0
Taulupe Faletau	Wales	10	2	0	0	0
Mike Phillips	Wales	10	2	0	0	0
Jamie Roberts	Wales	10	2	0	0	0
Lloyd Williams	Wales	10	2	0	0	0
Riccardo Bocchino	Italy	8	0	4	0	0
Ruaridh Jackson	Scotland	6	0	0	1	1
Marcelo Bosch	Argentina	5	0	1	1	0
Julio Farías Cabello	Argentina	5	1	0	0	0
Santiago Fernández	Argentina	5	1	0	0	0
Genaro Fessia	Argentina	5	1	0	0	0
Juan Figallo	Argentina	5	1	0	0	0
Agustin Gosio	Argentina	5	1	0	0	0
Juan Manuel Leguizamón	Argentina	5	1	0	0	0
Ben Alexander	Australia	5	1	0	0	0
Kurtley Beale	Australia	5	1	0	0	0
Rocky Elsom	Australia	5	1	0	0	0
Robert Horne	Australia	5	1	0	0	0
James Horwill	Australia	5	1	0	0	0
Digby Ioane	Australia	5	1	0	0	0
Salesi Ma'afu	Australia	5	1	0	0	0
Pat McCabe	Australia	5	1	0	0	0
Stephen Moore	Australia	5	1	0	0	0
Radike Samo	Australia	5	1	0	0	0
Aaron Carpenter	Canada	5	1	0	0	0
Jebb Sinclair	Canada	5	1	0	0	0
Ryan Smith	Canada	5	1	0	0	0
D. T. H. van der Merwe	Canada	5	1	0	0	0
Delon Armitage	England	5	1	0	0	0
Tom Croft	England	5	1	0	0	0
Leone Nakarawa	Fiji	5	1	0	0	0
Napolioni Nalaga	Fiji	5	1	0	0	0
Netani Talei	Fiji	5	1	0	0	0
Thierry Dusautoir	France	5	1	0	0	0
Maxime Médard	France	5	1	0	0	0
Maxime Mermoz	France	5	1	0	0	0
Lionel Nallet	France	5	1	0	0	0
Pascal Papé	France	5	1	0	0	0
Julien Pierre	France	5	1	0	0	0
Damien Traille	France	5	1	0	0	0
Dimitri Basilaia	Georgia	5	1	0	0	0
Mamuka Gorgodze	Georgia	5	1	0	0	0
Lasha Khmaladze	Georgia	5	1	0	0	0
Rory Best	Ireland	5	1	0	0	0
Isaac Boss	Ireland	5	1	0	0	0
Tony Buckley	Ireland	5	1	0	0	0
Shane Jennings	Ireland	5	1	0	0	0
Rob Kearney	Ireland	5	1	0	0	0
Fergus McFadden	Ireland	5	1	0	0	0
Seán O'Brien	Ireland	5	1	0	0	0
Brian O'Driscoll	Ireland	5	1	0	0	0
Andrew Trimble	Ireland	5	1	0	0	0
Martin Castrogiovanni	Italy	5	1	0	0	0
Edoardo Gori	Italy	5	1	0	0	0
Luke McLean	Italy	5	1	0	0	0
Luciano Orquera	Italy	5	1	0	0	0
Alessandro Zanni	Italy	5	1	0	0	0
Kosuke Endo	Japan	5	1	0	0	0
Kensuke Hatakeyama	Japan	5	1	0	0	0
Shota Horie	Japan	5	1	0	0	0
Michael Leitch	Japan	5	1	0	0	0
Hirotoki Onozawa	Japan	5	1	0	0	0
Alisi Tupuailei	Japan	5	1	0	0	0
Chrysander Botha	Namibia	5	1	0	0	0
Danie van Wyk	Namibia	5	1	0	0	0
Jimmy Cowan	New Zealand	5	1	0	0	0
Aaron Cruden	New Zealand	5	0	1	0	1
Andy Ellis	New Zealand	5	1	0	0	0
Andrew Hore	New Zealand	5	1	0	0	0
Cory Jane	New Zealand	5	1	0	0	0
Kevin Mealamu	New Zealand	5	1	0	0	0
Mils Muliaina	New Zealand	5	1	0	0	0
Kieran Read	New Zealand	5	1	0	0	0
Conrad Smith	New Zealand	5	1	0	0	0
Brad Thorn	New Zealand	5	1	0	0	0
Isaia Toeava	New Zealand	5	1	0	0	0
Tony Woodcock	New Zealand	5	1	0	0	0
Daniel Carpo	Romania	5	1	0	0	0
Ionel Cazan	Romania	5	1	0	0	0
Mihăiţă Lazăr	Romania	5	1	0	0	0
Vasily Artemyev	Russia	5	1	0	0	0
Alexey Makovetskiy	Russia	5	1	0	0	0
Alexander Yanyushkin	Russia	5	1	0	0	0
Anthony Perenise	Samoa	5	1	0	0	0
Joe Ansbro	Scotland	5	1	0	0	0
Mike Blair	Scotland	5	1	0	0	0
Tendai Mtawarira	South Africa	5	1	0	0	0
Gurthrö Steenkamp	South Africa	5	1	0	0	0
Tukulua Lokotui	Tonga	5	1	0	0	0
Viliami Maʻafu	Tonga	5	1	0	0	0
Sona Taumalolo	Tonga	5	1	0	0	0
Fetuʻu Vainikolo	Tonga	5	1	0	0	0
Paul Emerick	United States	5	1	0	0	0
JJ Gagiano	United States	5	1	0	0	0
Mike Petri	United States	5	1	0	0	0
Aled Brew	Wales	5	1	0	0	0
Lloyd Burns	Wales	5	1	0	0	0
Lee Byrne	Wales	5	1	0	0	0
Gethin Jenkins	Wales	5	1	0	0	0
Sam Warburton	Wales	5	1	0	0	0
Alun Wyn Jones	Wales	5	1	0	0	0
Shaun Webb	Japan	3	0	0	1	0
Stephen Donald	New Zealand	3	0	0	1	0
Yuri Kushnarev	Russia	3	0	0	1	0
James Paterson	United States	3	0	0	1	0
Waisea Luveniyali	Fiji	2	0	1	0	0
Murray Williams	Japan	2	0	1	0	0
Nese Malifa	United States	2	0	1	0	0

== Kicking Accuracy ==
Correct as of Wales vs Australia

Kicking Accuracy
Player	Team	Percentage
Waisea Luveniyali	Fiji	100% (1/1)
Murray Williams	Japan	100% (1/1)
Stephen Donald	New Zealand	100% (1/1)
Florin Vlaicu	Romania	100% (1/1)
Ruan Pienaar	South Africa	100% (6/6)
Ruaridh Jackson	Scotland	100% (1/1)
Seremaia Bai	Fiji	90% (9/10)
Morné Steyn	South Africa	87% (21/24)
Stephen Jones	Wales	86% (13/15)
Morgan Parra	France	85% (12/14)
Ronan O'Gara	Ireland	85% (18/21)
James Arlidge	Japan	81% (9/11)
Berrick Barnes	Australia	80% (4/5)
Tusi Pisi	Samoa	73% (8/11)
James O'Connor	Australia	71% (20/28)
Toby Flood	England	71% (10/14)
Dimitri Yachvili	France	68% (15/22)
Kurt Morath	Tonga	68% (17/25)
Rhys Priestland	Wales	68% (13/19)
Dan Carter	New Zealand	67% (8/12)
Marcelo Bosch	Argentina	66% (2/3)
Malkhaz Urjukashvili	Georgia	66% (2/3)
Paul Williams	Samoa	66% (6/9)
Piri Weepu	New Zealand	65% (15/23)
Mirco Bergamasco	Italy	63% (7/11)
James Pritchard	Canada	62% (8/13)
Konstantin Rachkov	Russia	62% (5/8)
Dan Parks	Scotland	62% (5/8)
Chris Paterson	Scotland	62% (8/13)
Chris Wyles	United States	62% (5/8)
Merab Kvirikashvili	Georgia	59% (10/17)
Colin Slade	New Zealand	58% (14/24)
Riccardo Bocchino	Italy	57% (4/7)
Ionuț Dimofte	Romania	57% (4/7)
James Hook	Wales	53% (8/15)
Felipe Contepomi	Argentina	50% (8/16)
Martín Rodríguez	Argentina	50% (8/16)
Quade Cooper	Australia	50% (4/8)
Jonny Wilkinson	England	50% (10/20)
François Trinh-Duc	France	50% (1/2)
Theuns Kotzé	Namibia	50% (4/8)
Aaron Cruden	New Zealand	50% (1/2)
François Steyn	South Africa	50% (2/4)
Nese Malifa	United States	50% (1/2)
James Paterson	United States	50% (1/2)
Johnny Sexton	Ireland	44% (7/16)
Ander Monro	Canada	40% (2/5)
Dănuț Dumbravă	Romania	38% (5/13)
Leigh Halfpenny	Wales	33% (1/3)
Shaun Webb	Japan	25% (1/4)
Yuri Kushnarev	Russia	20% (1/5)

== Hat-tricks ==
Unless otherwise noted, players in this list scored a hat-trick of tries.

Rank	Player	Team	Opponent	Stage	Result	Venue	Date
1	Theuns Kotzé^{D3}	Namibia	Fiji	Pool	25–49	Rotorua International Stadium	10 September 2011
2	Vereniki Goneva^{T4}	Fiji	Namibia	Pool	49–25	Rotorua International Stadium	10 September 2011
3	Alesana Tuilagi	Samoa	Namibia	Pool	49–12	Rotorua International Stadium	14 September 2011
4	Vincent Clerc	France	Canada	Pool	46–19	McLean Park, Napier	18 September 2011
5	Adam Ashley-Cooper	Australia	United States	Pool	67–5	Wellington Regional Stadium	23 September 2011
6	Mark Cueto	England	Romania	Pool	67–3	Otago Stadium, Dunedin	24 September 2011
7	Chris Ashton	England	Romania	Pool	67–3	Otago Stadium, Dunedin	24 September 2011
8	Scott Williams	Wales	Namibia	Pool	81–7	Yarrow Stadium, New Plymouth	26 September 2011
9	Zac Guildford^{T4}	New Zealand	Canada	Pool	79–15	Wellington Regional Stadium	2 October 2011

Key
^{D3}	Scored hat-trick of drop goals
^{T4}	Scored four tries

== Discipline ==
In total, two red cards and 18 yellow cards were issued during the tournament.

=== Yellow cards ===
1 yellow card

- (Argentina) Nicolas Vergallo (vs New Zealand)
- (England) Dan Cole (vs Argentina)
- (England) Dylan Hartley (vs Georgia)
- (France) Fabrice Estebanez (vs Tonga)
- (Italy) Fabio Ongaro (vs Russia)
- (Japan) James Arlidge (vs Tonga)
- (Namibia) Rohan Kitshoff (vs Samoa)
- (Namibia) Raoul Larson (vs Wales)
- (New Zealand) Sonny Bill Williams (vs Australia)
- (Romania) Mihaita Lazar (vs Argentina)
- (Russia) Konstantin Rachkov (vs Ireland)
- (Samoa) Paul Williams (vs Namibia)
- (South Africa) John Smit (vs Samoa)
- (Tonga) Halani Aulika (vs Japan)
- (Tonga) Suka Hufanga (vs France)
- (Tonga) Tukulua Lokotui (vs Japan)
- (United States) Blaine Scully (vs Australia)
- (United States) Louis Stanfill (vs Italy)

=== Red cards ===
1 red card

- (Samoa) Paul Williams (vs South Africa) Strike to the face of Heinrich Brüssow.
- (Wales) Sam Warburton (vs France) dangerous tackle on Vincent Clerc.

=== Penalty tries ===
1 penalty try

- Awarded against Namibia, vs Samoa
- Awarded against Namibia, vs South Africa
- Awarded against Russia, vs Italy
- Awarded against United States, vs Italy

== Stadiums ==
Stadium	City	Capacity	Matches played	Overall attendance	Average attendance per match	Average attendance as % of capacity	Tries scored	Avg. tries scored / match	Overall points scored	Avg. points scored / match
Eden Park	Auckland	60,000	11	637,395	57,945	96.58%	33	3.00	359	32.64
Wellington Regional Stadium	Wellington	40,000	8	268,483	33,560	83.90%	43	5.38	351	43.88
Waikato Stadium	Hamilton	36,000	3	89,764	29,921	83.11%	25	8.33	193	63.33
Otago Stadium	Dunedin	30,748	4	104,531	26,133	84.99%	21	5.25	185	46.25
North Harbour Stadium	Auckland	30,000	4	110,873	27,718	92.39%	26	6.50	211	52.75
Rotorua Int'l Stadium	Rotorua	26,000	3	48,513	16,171	62.20%	27	9.00	209	69.67
Stadium Taranaki	New Plymouth	26,000	3	48,464	16,155	62.13%	18	6.00	139	46.33
McLean Park	Napier	22,000	2	28,565	14,283	64.92%	10	5.00	111	55.50
Rugby Park Stadium	Invercargill	20,000	3	35,464	11,821	59.11%	13	6.50	130	43.33
Trafalgar Park	Nelson	18,000	3	43,722	14,574	80.97%	30	10.00	197	65.67
Northland Events Centre	Whangārei	18,000	2	34,538	17,269	95.94%	11	5.50	94	47.00
Arena Manawatu	Palmerston North	15,000	2	26,982	13,491	89.94%	5	2.50	66	33.00
Total		1,710,992	48	1,477,294	30,777	86.34%	262	5.46	2,245	46.77

== See also ==
- 2015 Rugby World Cup statistics
- Records and statistics of the Rugby World Cup
- List of Rugby World Cup hat-tricks
- List of Rugby World Cup red cards
