= 2011 Rugby World Cup Pool D =

Rugby World Cup (2011) Pool D

Pool D of the 2011 Rugby World Cup began on 10 September 2011 and was completed on 2 October. The pool was composed of the current Rugby World Cup holders South Africa, as well as Wales, Samoa, Fiji and Namibia.

== Standings ==
| Pos | Team | Pld | W | D | L | PF | PA | PD | T | B | Pts | Qualification |
|---|---|---|---|---|---|---|---|---|---|---|---|---|
| 1 | South Africa | 4 | 4 | 0 | 0 | 166 | 24 | +142 | 21 | 2 | 18 | Advanced to the quarter-finals and qualified for the 2015 Rugby World Cup |
| 2 | Wales | 4 | 3 | 0 | 1 | 180 | 34 | +146 | 23 | 3 | 15 | Advanced to the quarter-finals and qualified for the 2015 Rugby World Cup |
| 3 | Samoa | 4 | 2 | 0 | 2 | 91 | 49 | +42 | 9 | 2 | 10 | Eliminated but qualified for 2015 Rugby World Cup |
| 4 | Fiji | 4 | 1 | 0 | 3 | 59 | 167 | −108 | 7 | 1 | 5 | |
| 5 | Namibia | 4 | 0 | 0 | 4 | 44 | 266 | −222 | 5 | 0 | 0 | |

== Matches ==
All times are local New Zealand time (UTC+12 until 24 September, UTC+13 from 25 September)

=== Fiji v Namibia ===
10 September 2011
15:30

| Fiji | 49–25 | Namibia |
| Try: Goneva (4) 6' c, 20' m, 40+' c, 51' c Nakarawa 18' c Nalaga 77' c Con: Bai (5/6); Pen: Bai (3/3) 17', 24', 75' | Report | Try: Koll 43' m Botha 56' m Pen: Kotzé (2/3) 4', 37'; Drop: Kotzé (3/3) 11', 13', 15' |

Rotorua International Stadium, Rotorua
Attendance: 10,100
Referee: Nigel Owens (Wales)

| FB | 15 | Kini Murimurivalu |
| RW | 14 | Vereniki Goneva | (substituted off) 80+' |
| OC | 13 | Gabiriele Lovobalavu |
| IC | 12 | Seremaia Bai |
| LW | 11 | Napolioni Nalaga |
| FH | 10 | Waisea Luveniyali |
| SH | 9 | Nemia Kenatale | (substituted off) 59' |
| N8 | 8 | Netani Talei | (substituted off) 56' |
| OF | 7 | Malakai Ravulo |
| BF | 6 | Dominiko Waqaniburotu |
| RL | 5 | Wame Lewaravu | (substituted off) 75' |
| LL | 4 | Leone Nakarawa |
| TP | 3 | Deacon Manu (c) |
| HK | 2 | Viliame Veikoso | (substituted off) 51' |
| LP | 1 | Campese Ma'afu | (substituted off) 63' |
Replacements:
| HK | 16 | Sunia Koto | (substituted on) 51' |
| PR | 17 | Waisea Nailago | (substituted on) 63' |
| LK | 18 | Sekonaia Kalou | (substituted on) 75' |
| FL | 19 | Akapusi Qera | (substituted on) 56' |
| SH | 20 | Vitori Buatava | (substituted on) 59' |
| CE | 21 | Albert Vulivuli |
| FB | 22 | Iliesa Keresoni | (substituted on) 80+' |
Coach:
Sam Domoni

| FB | 15 | Chrysander Botha |
| RW | 14 | Danie Dames |
| OC | 13 | Danie van Wyk |
| IC | 12 | Piet van Zyl |
| LW | 11 | Conrad Marais | (substituted off) 69' |
| FH | 10 | Theuns Kotzé | (substituted off) 80' |
| SH | 9 | Eugene Jantjies | (substituted off) 69' |
| N8 | 8 | Jacques Nieuwenhuis |
| OF | 7 | Jacques Burger (c) |
| BF | 6 | Tinus du Plessis | (substituted off) 48' |
| RL | 5 | Nico Esterhuyse | (substituted off) 54' |
| LL | 4 | Heinz Koll |
| TP | 3 | Raoul Larson |
| HK | 2 | Hugo Horn | (substituted off) 54' |
| LP | 1 | Johnny Redelinghuys |
Replacements:
| HK | 16 | Bertus O'Callaghan | (substituted on) 54' |
| PR | 17 | Jané du Toit |
| N8 | 18 | PJ van Lill | (substituted on) 54' |
| FL | 19 | Rohan Kitshoff | (substituted on) 48' |
| SH | 20 | Ryan de la Harpe | (substituted on) 69' |
| CE | 21 | Darryl de la Harpe | (substituted on) 69' |
| WG | 22 | Llewellyn Winkler | (substituted on) 80' |
Coach:
Johan Diergaardt

Man of the Match:
Vereniki Goneva (Fiji)

Touch judges:
Jonathan Kaplan (South Africa)
Jérôme Garces (France)
Television match official:
Graham Hughes (England)

=== South Africa v Wales ===
11 September 2011
20:30

| South Africa | 17–16 | Wales |
| Try: F. Steyn 3' c Hougaard 65' c Con: M. Steyn (2/2); Pen: M. Steyn (1/1) 20' | Report | Try: Faletau 54' c Con: Hook (1/1); Pen: Hook (3/5) 10', 32', 50' |

Wellington Regional Stadium, Wellington
Attendance: 33,331
Referee: Wayne Barnes (England)

| FB | 15 | François Steyn |
| RW | 14 | JP Pietersen |
| OC | 13 | Jaque Fourie |
| IC | 12 | Jean de Villiers | (substituted off) 25' |
| LW | 11 | Bryan Habana | (substituted off) 61' |
| FH | 10 | Morné Steyn |
| SH | 9 | Fourie du Preez |
| N8 | 8 | Pierre Spies | (substituted off) 57' |
| BF | 7 | Schalk Burger |
| OF | 6 | Heinrich Brüssow |
| RL | 5 | Victor Matfield | (substituted off) 44' |
| LL | 4 | Danie Rossouw |
| TP | 3 | Jannie du Plessis |
| HK | 2 | John Smit (c) | (substituted off) 57' |
| LP | 1 | Tendai Mtawarira | (substituted off) 55' |
Replacements:
| HK | 16 | Bismarck du Plessis | (substituted on) 57' |
| PR | 17 | Gurthro Steenkamp | (substituted on) 55' |
| PR | 18 | CJ van der Linde |
| LK | 19 | Johann Muller | (substituted on) 44' |
| FL | 20 | Willem Alberts | (substituted on) 57' |
| SH | 21 | Francois Hougaard | (substituted on) 61' |
| FH | 22 | Butch James | (substituted on) 25' |
Coach:
Peter de Villiers

| FB | 15 | James Hook |
| RW | 14 | George North |
| OC | 13 | Jonathan Davies |
| IC | 12 | Jamie Roberts |
| LW | 11 | Shane Williams |
| FH | 10 | Rhys Priestland |
| SH | 9 | Mike Phillips |
| N8 | 8 | Taulupe Faletau |
| OF | 7 | Sam Warburton (c) |
| BF | 6 | Dan Lydiate |
| RL | 5 | Alun Wyn Jones | (substituted off) 66' |
| LL | 4 | Luke Charteris |
| TP | 3 | Adam Jones |
| HK | 2 | Huw Bennett |
| LP | 1 | Paul James |
Replacements:
| HK | 16 | Lloyd Burns |
| PR | 17 | Ryan Bevington |
| LK | 18 | Bradley Davies | (substituted on) 66' |
| N8 | 19 | Andy Powell |
| SH | 20 | Tavis Knoyle |
| CE | 21 | Scott Williams |
| FB | 22 | Leigh Halfpenny |
Coach:
(New Zealand) Warren Gatland

Man of the Match:
Sam Warburton (Wales)

Touch judges:
George Clancy (Ireland)
Vinny Munro (New Zealand)
Television match official:
Matt Goddard (Australia)

=== Samoa v Namibia ===
14 September 2011
14:30

| Samoa | 49–12 | Namibia |
| Try: Fotuali'i 1' c Tuilagi (3) 17' c, 35' m, 55' c Williams 59' c Penalty try 70' c Con: T. Pisi (2/2); Williams (3/3); Pen: T. Pisi (2/2) 10', 24'; Williams (1/1) 53' | Report | Try: Van Wyk 63' m Kotzé 79' c Con: Kotzé (1/2) |

Rotorua International Stadium, Rotorua
Attendance: 12,752
Referee: Romain Poite (France)

| FB | 15 | Paul Williams | (yellow card) 40' |
| RW | 14 | Sailosi Tagicakibau |
| OC | 13 | George Pisi |
| IC | 12 | Seilala Mapusua | | (substituted off) 50' |
| LW | 11 | Alesana Tuilagi |
| FH | 10 | Tusi Pisi | | (substituted off) 28' |
| SH | 9 | Kahn Fotuali'i | | (substituted off) 50' |
| N8 | 8 | George Stowers |
| OF | 7 | Maurie Fa'asavalu |
| BF | 6 | Taiasina Tuifu'a | | (substituted off) 29' |
| RL | 5 | Kane Thompson | | (substituted off) 62' |
| LL | 4 | Daniel Leo |
| TP | 3 | Anthony Perenise | | (substituted off) 53' |
| HK | 2 | Mahonri Schwalger (c) | | (substituted off) 57' |
| LP | 1 | Sakaria Taulafo |
Replacements:
| HK | 16 | Ti'i Paulo | | (substituted on) 57' |
| PR | 17 | Census Johnston | | (substituted on) 53' |
| LK | 18 | Joe Tekori | | (substituted on) 62' |
| FL | 19 | Ofisa Treviranus | | (substituted on) 29' |
| SH | 20 | Junior Poluleuligaga | | (substituted on) 50' |
| CE | 21 | Eliota Fuimaono-Sapolu | | (substituted on) 50' |
| FH | 22 | Tasesa Lavea | | (substituted on) 28' |
Coach:
Fuimaono Tafua

| FB | 15 | Chrysander Botha |
| RW | 14 | Danie Dames |
| OC | 13 | Danie van Wyk | | 51' to 56' |
| IC | 12 | Piet van Zyl |
| LW | 11 | Llewellyn Winckler |
| FH | 10 | Theuns Kotzé |
| SH | 9 | Eugene Jantjies |
| N8 | 8 | PJ van Lill | | | | (substituted off) 67' |
| OF | 7 | Jacques Burger (c) |
| BF | 6 | Rohan Kitshoff | (yellow card) 66' |
| RL | 5 | Henk Franken | | (substituted off) 50' |
| LL | 4 | Heinz Koll |
| TP | 3 | Raoul Larson | | | (substituted off) 75' |
| HK | 2 | Hugo Horn | | (substituted off) 60' |
| LP | 1 | Johnny Redelinghuys | | (substituted off) 60' | (substituted on) 75' |
Replacements:
| HK | 16 | Bertus O'Callaghan | | (substituted on) 60' |
| PR | 17 | Jané du Toit | | (substituted on) 60' |
| LK | 18 | Nico Esterhuyse | | (substituted on) 50' | 56' to 67' |
| FL | 19 | Renaud van Neel | | | (substituted on) 56' |
| SH | 20 | Ryan de la Harpe |
| CE | 21 | Darryl de la Harpe | | (substituted on) 51' | (substituted off) 56' |
| FH | 22 | Tertius Losper |
Coach:
Johan Diergaardt

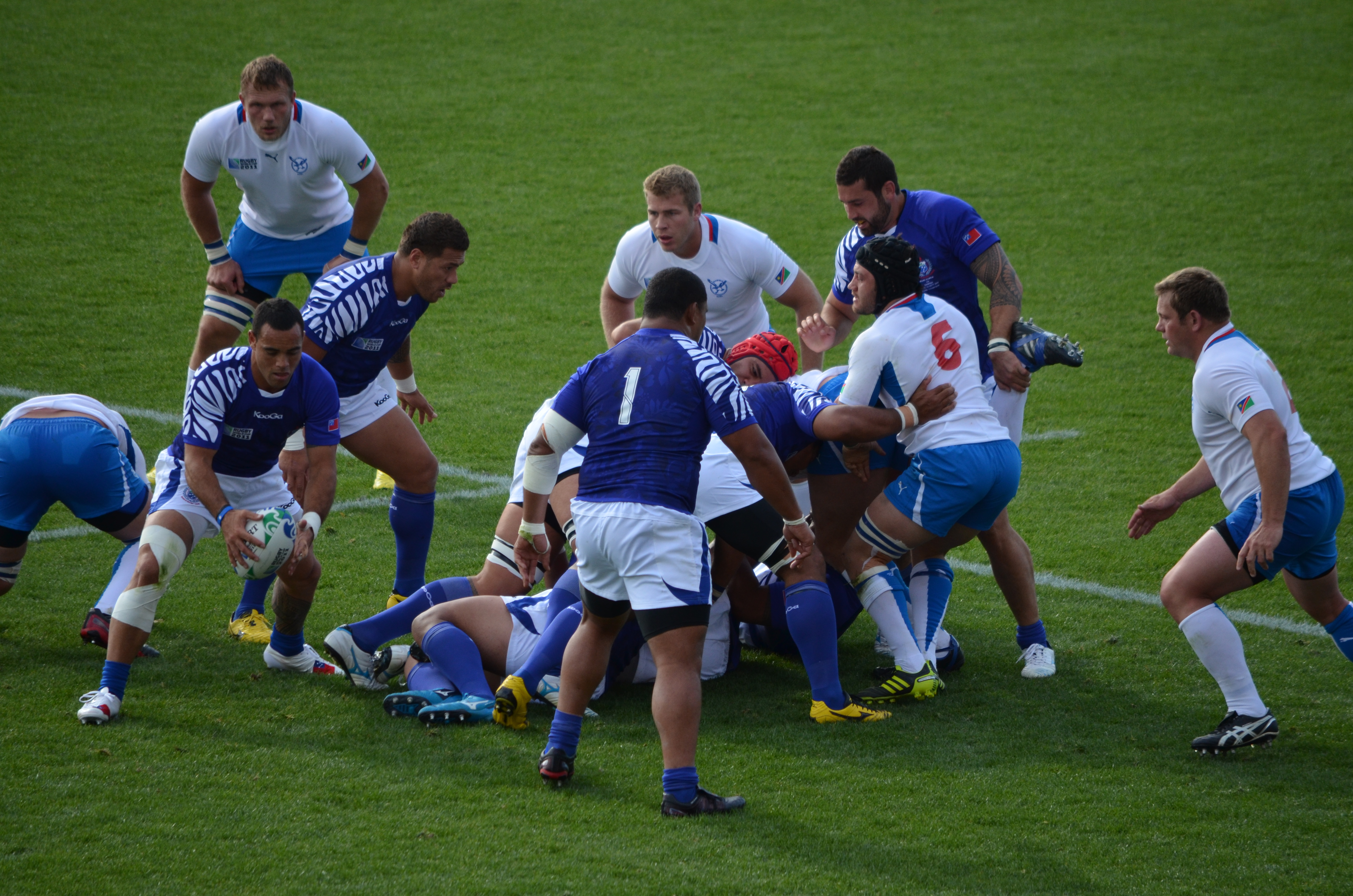
Match Samoa vs Namibia

Man of the Match:
George Stowers (Samoa)

Touch judges:
Wayne Barnes (England)
Jérôme Garces (France)
Television match official:
Graham Hughes (England)

=== South Africa v Fiji ===
17 September 2011
18:00

| South Africa | 49–3 | Fiji |
| Try: Steenkamp 26' c Fourie 34' m F. Steyn 49' c M. Steyn 61' c Mtawarira 70' c Rossouw 75' c Con: M. Steyn (5/6); Pen: M. Steyn (2/4) 29', 40'; F. Steyn (1/1) 11' | Report | Pen: Bai (1/1) 20' |

Wellington Regional Stadium, Wellington
Attendance: 33,262
Referee: Romain Poite (France)

| FB | 15 | Patrick Lambie |
| RW | 14 | Odwa Ndungane | (substituted off) 54' |
| OC | 13 | Jaque Fourie | (substituted off) 71' |
| IC | 12 | François Steyn |
| LW | 11 | JP Pietersen |
| FH | 10 | Morné Steyn |
| SH | 9 | Fourie du Preez | (substituted off) 71' |
| N8 | 8 | Pierre Spies |
| BF | 7 | Schalk Burger |
| OF | 6 | Heinrich Brüssow |
| RL | 5 | Danie Rossouw |
| LL | 4 | Bakkies Botha | (substituted off) 41' |
| TP | 3 | Jannie du Plessis | | (substituted off) 80+' |
| HK | 2 | John Smit (c) | (substituted off) 54' | (substituted on) 80+' |
| LP | 1 | Gurthrö Steenkamp | (substituted off) 65' |
Replacements:
| HK | 16 | Bismarck du Plessis | (substituted on) 54' |
| PR | 17 | Tendai Mtawarira | (substituted on) 65' |
| FL | 18 | Francois Louw | | (substituted on) 47' | (substituted off) 56' |
| FL | 19 | Willem Alberts | (substituted on) 41' | (substituted off) 47' | (substituted on) 56' |
| SH | 20 | Francois Hougaard | (substituted on) 54' |
| SH | 21 | Ruan Pienaar | (substituted on) 71' |
| CE | 22 | Juan de Jongh | (substituted on) 71' |
Coach:
Peter de Villiers

| FB | 15 | Kini Murimurivalu |
| RW | 14 | Vereniki Goneva |
| OC | 13 | Gabiriele Lovobalavu |
| IC | 12 | Seremaia Bai | (substituted off) 74' |
| LW | 11 | Napolioni Nalaga |
| FH | 10 | Waisea Luveniyali | (substituted off) 65' |
| SH | 9 | Nemia Kenatale | (substituted off) 54' |
| N8 | 8 | Sakiusa Matadigo | (substituted off) 50' |
| OF | 7 | Akapusi Qera |
| BF | 6 | Dominiko Waqaniburotu |
| RL | 5 | Wame Lewaravu | (substituted off) 74' |
| LL | 4 | Leone Nakarawa |
| TP | 3 | Deacon Manu (c) | (substituted off) 71' |
| HK | 2 | Sunia Koto | (substituted off) 65' |
| LP | 1 | Campese Ma'afu |
Replacements:
| HK | 16 | Talemaitoga Tuapati | (substituted on) 65' |
| PR | 17 | Waisea Nailago | (substituted on) 71' |
| FL | 18 | Netani Talei | (substituted on) 74' |
| N8 | 19 | Sisa Koyamaibole | (substituted on) 50' |
| SH | 20 | Vitori Buatava | (substituted on) 54' |
| FH | 21 | Nicky Little | (substituted on) 65' |
| CE | 22 | Ravai Fatiaki | (substituted on) 74' |
Coach:
Sam Domoni

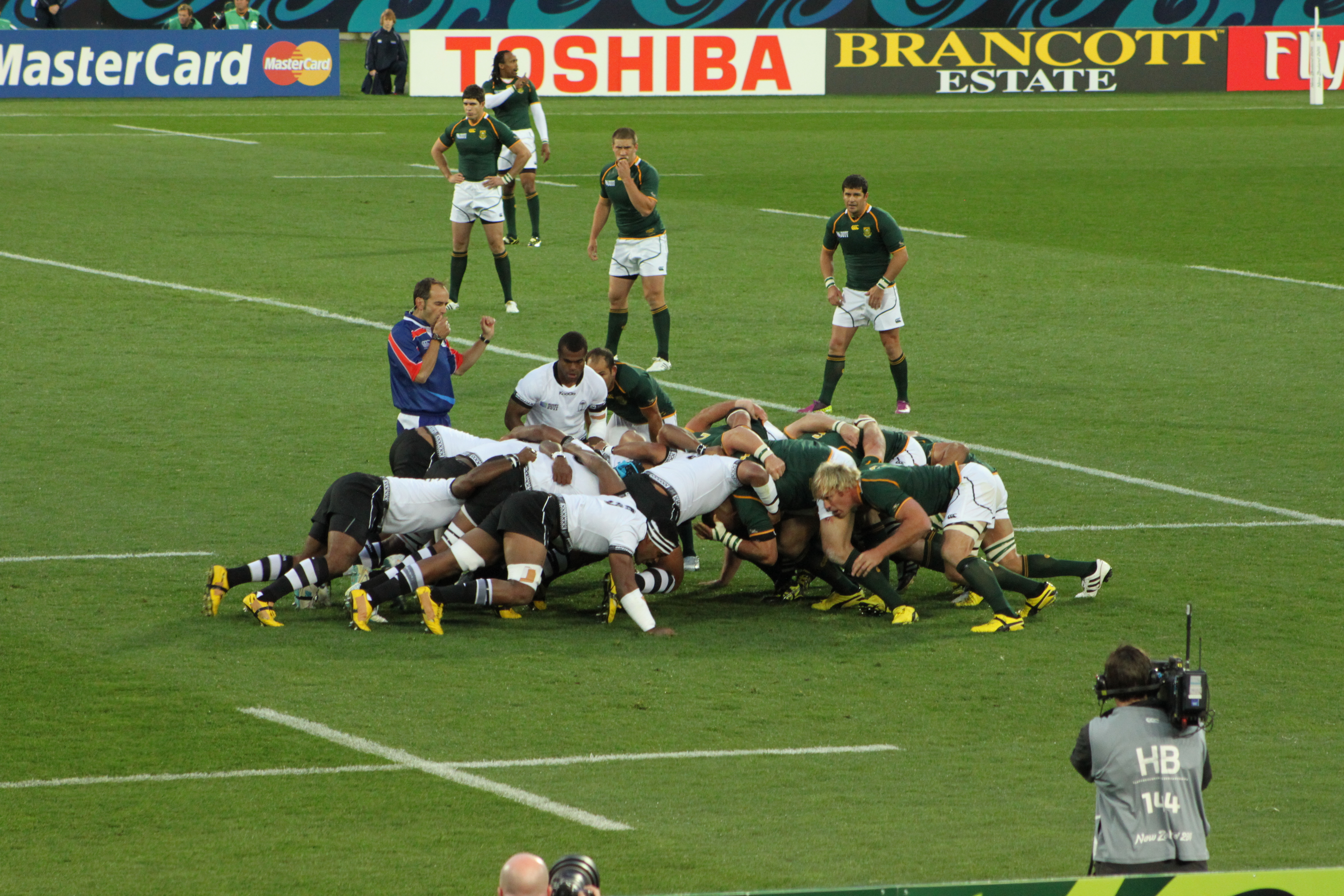
Match South Africa vs Fiji

Man of the Match:
Danie Rossouw (South Africa)

Touch judges:
George Clancy (Ireland)
Vinny Munro (New Zealand)
Television match official:
Matt Goddard (Australia)

=== Wales v Samoa ===
18 September 2011
15:30

| Wales | 17–10 | Samoa |
| Try: Sh. Williams 67' m Pen: Hook (2/3) 12', 27'; Priestland (2/2) 43', 66' | Report | Try: Perenise 40+' c Con: Williams (1/1); Pen: Williams (1/3) 21' |

Waikato Stadium, Hamilton
Attendance: 30,804
Referee: Alain Rolland (Ireland)

| FB | 15 | James Hook | (substituted off) 41' |
| RW | 14 | George North |
| OC | 13 | Jonathan Davies |
| IC | 12 | Jamie Roberts |
| LW | 11 | Shane Williams |
| FH | 10 | Rhys Priestland |
| SH | 9 | Mike Phillips |
| N8 | 8 | Taulupe Faletau |
| OF | 7 | Sam Warburton (c) |
| BF | 6 | Dan Lydiate | (substituted off) 10' |
| RL | 5 | Alun Wyn Jones | (substituted off) 69' |
| LL | 4 | Luke Charteris |
| TP | 3 | Adam Jones |
| HK | 2 | Huw Bennett | (substituted off) 63' |
| LP | 1 | Paul James | (substituted off) 63' |
Replacements:
| HK | 16 | Lloyd Burns | (substituted on) 63' |
| PR | 17 | Gethin Jenkins | (substituted on) 63' |
| LK | 18 | Bradley Davies | (substituted on) 69' |
| N8 | 19 | Andy Powell | (substituted on) 10' |
| SH | 20 | Tavis Knoyle |
| CE | 21 | Scott Williams |
| FB | 22 | Leigh Halfpenny | (substituted on) 41' |
Coach:
(New Zealand) Warren Gatland

| FB | 15 | Paul Williams |
| RW | 14 | Sailosi Tagicakibau | (substituted off) 56' |
| OC | 13 | George Pisi |
| IC | 12 | Seilala Mapusua | (substituted off) 70' |
| LW | 11 | Alesana Tuilagi |
| FH | 10 | Tasesa Lavea | (substituted off) 69' |
| SH | 9 | Kahn Fotuali'i |
| N8 | 8 | George Stowers |
| OF | 7 | Maurie Fa'asavalu |
| BF | 6 | Ofisa Treviranus | (substituted off) 77' |
| RL | 5 | Kane Thompson |
| LL | 4 | Daniel Leo | (substituted off) 69' |
| TP | 3 | Anthony Perenise | (substituted off) 70' |
| HK | 2 | Mahonri Schwalger (c) | (substituted off) 73' |
| LP | 1 | Sakaria Taulafo |
Replacements:
| HK | 16 | Ti'i Paulo | (substituted on) 73' |
| PR | 17 | Census Johnston | (substituted on) 70' |
| LK | 18 | Joe Tekori | (substituted on) 69' |
| FL | 19 | Manaia Salavea | (substituted on) 77' |
| SH | 20 | Jeremy Su'a | (substituted on) 69' |
| CE | 21 | Eliota Fuimaono-Sapolu | (substituted on) 70' |
| FB | 22 | James So'oialo | (substituted on) 56' |
Coach:
Fuimaono Tafua

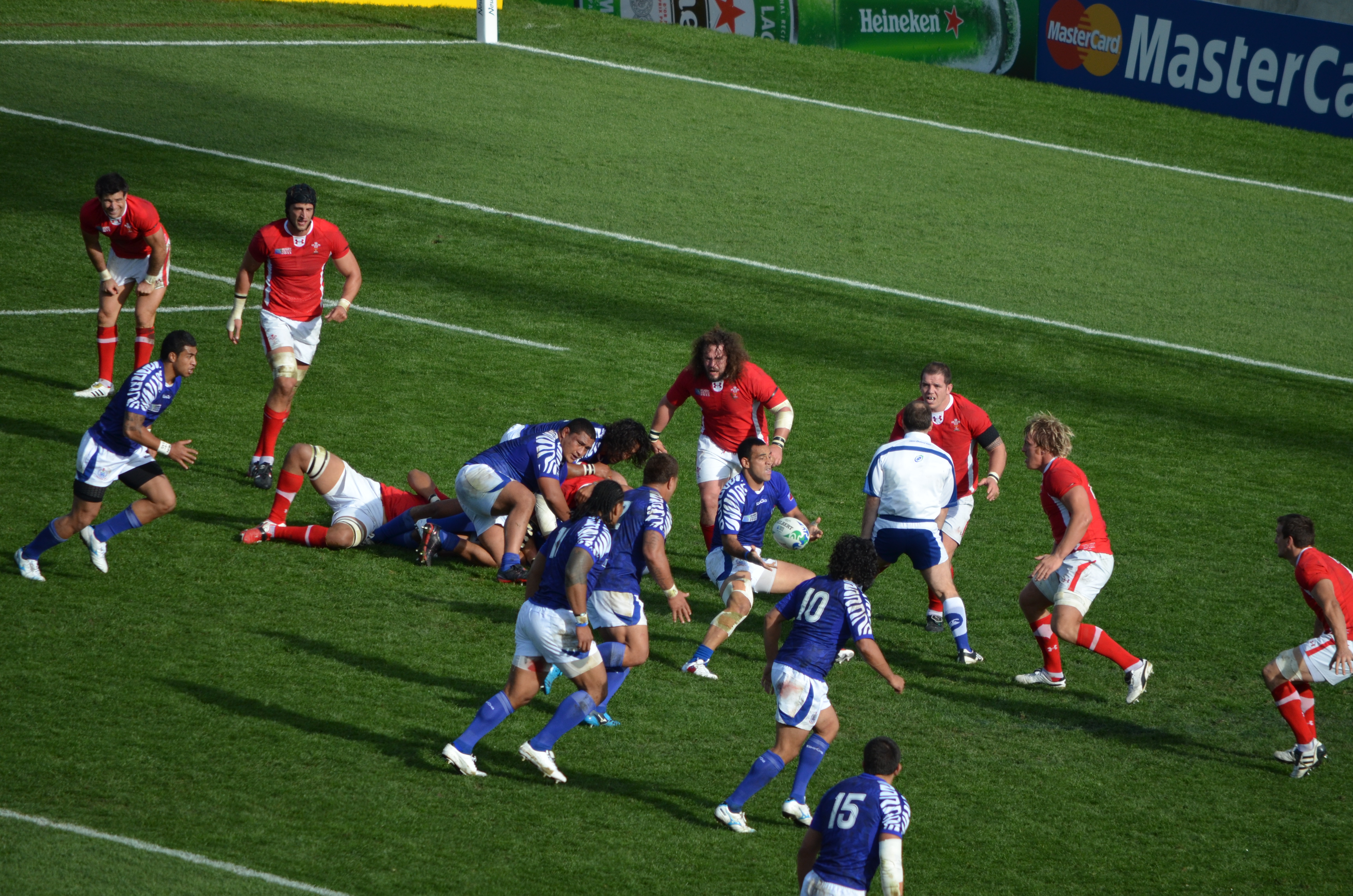
Match Wales vs Samoa

Man of the Match:
Alun Wyn Jones (Wales)

Touch judges:
Romain Poite (France)
Jérôme Garces (France)
Television match official:
Giulio De Santis (Italy)

=== South Africa v Namibia ===
22 September 2011
20:00

| South Africa | 87–0 | Namibia |
| Try: Aplon (2) 7' c, 65' c Habana 22' c Penalty try 30' c Fourie 38' c F. Steyn 49' c M. Steyn 61' c De Jongh (2) 63' c, 71' c Hougaard (2) 68' c, 80' c Rossouw 78' c Con: M. Steyn (6/6); Pienaar (6/6); Pen: M. Steyn (1/1) 4' | Report |

North Harbour Stadium, Auckland
Attendance: 26,839
Referee: George Clancy (Ireland)

| FB | 15 | Patrick Lambie |
| RW | 14 | Gio Aplon |
| OC | 13 | Jaque Fourie |
| IC | 12 | François Steyn | (substituted off) 61' |
| LW | 11 | Bryan Habana | (substituted off) 61' |
| FH | 10 | Morné Steyn | (substituted off) 62' |
| SH | 9 | Francois Hougaard |
| N8 | 8 | Pierre Spies | (substituted off) 79' |
| BF | 7 | Schalk Burger | 27' to 31' |
| OF | 6 | Willem Alberts |
| RL | 5 | Danie Rossouw |
| LL | 4 | Bakkies Botha | | | (substituted off) 50' |
| TP | 3 | CJ van der Linde | (substituted off) 50' |
| HK | 2 | John Smit (c) |
| LP | 1 | Gurthrö Steenkamp | (substituted off) 61' |
Replacements:
| HK | 16 | Chiliboy Ralepelle | (substituted on) 50' |
| PR | 17 | Tendai Mtawarira | (substituted on) 61' |
| FL | 18 | Francois Louw | (substituted on) 27' | (substituted off) 31' | (substituted on) 50' |
| FL | 19 | Heinrich Brüssow | (substituted on) 79' |
| SH | 20 | Fourie du Preez | (substituted on) 61' |
| SH | 21 | Ruan Pienaar | (substituted on) 62' |
| CE | 22 | Juan de Jongh | (substituted on) 61' |
Coach:
Peter de Villiers

| FB | 15 | Chrysander Botha |
| RW | 14 | Danie Dames | (substituted off) 66' |
| OC | 13 | Danie van Wyk |
| IC | 12 | Piet van Zyl |
| LW | 11 | Heini Bock | (substituted off) 46' |
| FH | 10 | Theuns Kotzé |
| SH | 9 | Eugene Jantjies | (substituted off) 70' |
| N8 | 8 | Jacques Nieuwenhuis | (substituted off) 55' |
| OF | 7 | Jacques Burger (c) |
| BF | 6 | Tinus du Plessis |
| RL | 5 | Nico Esterhuyse |
| LL | 4 | Heinz Koll | (substituted off) 54' |
| TP | 3 | Marius Visser | (substituted off) 40+' |
| HK | 2 | Bertus O'Callaghan | (substituted off) 43' |
| LP | 1 | Johnny Redelinghuys |
Replacements:
| HK | 16 | Hugo Horn | (substituted on) 43' |
| PR | 17 | Jané du Toit | (substituted on) 40+' |
| N8 | 18 | PJ van Lill | (substituted on) 54' |
| FL | 19 | Rohan Kitshoff | (substituted on) 55' |
| SH | 20 | Ryan de la Harpe | (substituted on) 70' |
| CE | 21 | Darryl de la Harpe | (substituted on) 66' |
| WG | 22 | Conrad Marais | (substituted on) 46' |
Coach:
Johan Diergaardt

Man of the Match:
Willem Alberts (South Africa)

Touch judges:
Bryce Lawrence (New Zealand)
Tim Hayes (Wales)
Television match official:
Graham Hughes (England)

=== Fiji v Samoa ===
25 September 2011
15:30

| Fiji | 7–27 | Samoa |
| Try: Talei 67' c Con: Luveniyali (1/1) | Report | Try: Fotuali'i 62' m Stowers 70' c Con: Williams (1/1); Pen: Pisi (4/6) 6', 10', 27', 45'; Drop: Pisi (1/2) 12' |

Eden Park, Auckland
Attendance: 60,327
Referee: Bryce Lawrence (New Zealand)

| FB | 15 | Kini Murimurivalu |
| RW | 14 | Vereniki Goneva |
| OC | 13 | Gabiriele Lovobalavu |
| IC | 12 | Seremaia Bai | (substituted off) 64' |
| LW | 11 | Napolioni Nalaga |
| FH | 10 | Nicky Little | (substituted off) 58' |
| SH | 9 | Nemia Kenatale | (substituted off) 61' |
| N8 | 8 | Sisa Koyamaibole |
| OF | 7 | Malakai Ravulo | (substituted off) 56' |
| BF | 6 | Netani Talei |
| RL | 5 | Leone Nakarawa |
| LL | 4 | Sekonaia Kalou | (substituted off) 65' |
| TP | 3 | Deacon Manu (c) | (substituted off) 68' |
| HK | 2 | Sunia Koto |
| LP | 1 | Campese Ma'afu |
Replacements:
| HK | 16 | Talemaitoga Tuapati | | (substituted on) 75' |
| PR | 17 | Setefano Somoca | (substituted on) 68' |
| LK | 18 | Rupeni Nasiga | (substituted on) 65' |
| FL | 19 | Akapusi Qera | (substituted on) 56' |
| SH | 20 | Vitori Buatava | (substituted on) 61' |
| CE | 21 | Albert Vulivuli | (substituted on) 64' |
| FH | 22 | Waisea Luveniyali | (substituted on) 58' | (substituted off) 75' |
Coach:
Sam Domoni

| FB | 15 | Paul Williams |
| RW | 14 | Sailosi Tagicakibau |
| OC | 13 | George Pisi | (substituted off) 53' |
| IC | 12 | Seilala Mapusua |
| LW | 11 | Alesana Tuilagi |
| FH | 10 | Tusi Pisi | (substituted off) 64' |
| SH | 9 | Kahn Fotuali'i |
| N8 | 8 | George Stowers |
| OF | 7 | Maurie Fa'asavalu | (substituted off) 40' |
| BF | 6 | Taiasina Tuifu'a |
| RL | 5 | Kane Thompson | (substituted off) 63' |
| LL | 4 | Daniel Leo |
| TP | 3 | Census Johnston | (substituted off) 53' | (substituted on) 71' |
| HK | 2 | Mahonri Schwalger (c) | (substituted off) 66' | (substituted on) 75' |
| LP | 1 | Sakaria Taulafo | | (substituted off) 71' |
Replacements:
| HK | 16 | Ti'i Paulo | (substituted on) 66' | (substituted off) 75' |
| PR | 17 | Anthony Perenise | (substituted on) 53' |
| LK | 18 | Filipo Levi | (substituted on) 63' |
| FL | 19 | Manaia Salavea | (substituted on) 40' |
| SH | 20 | Jeremy Su'a | (substituted on) 64' |
| CE | 21 | Eliota Fuimaono-Sapolu | (substituted on) 53' |
| FB | 22 | James So'oialo |
Coach:
Fuimaono Tafua

Man of the Match:
Paul Williams (Samoa)

Touch judges:
George Clancy (Ireland)
Stuart Terheege (England)
Television match official:
Graham Hughes (England)

=== Wales v Namibia ===
26 September 2011
19:30

| Wales | 81–7 | Namibia |
| Try: Sc. Williams (3) 8' m, 47' c, 70' c Brew 14' c Faletau 18' c Jenkins 50' c North (2) 61' c, 66' c J. Davies 62' c L. Williams 75' m Byrne 77' m A.W. Jones 80+' c Con: S. Jones (6/7); Priestland (3/5); Pen: S. Jones (1/1) 3' | Report | Try: Koll 53' c Con: Kotzé (1/1) |

Stadium Taranaki, New Plymouth
Attendance: 13,710
Referee: Steve Walsh (Australia)

| FB | 15 | Lee Byrne |
| RW | 14 | Leigh Halfpenny |
| OC | 13 | Jonathan Davies |
| IC | 12 | Scott Williams |
| LW | 11 | Aled Brew | (substituted off) 55' |
| FH | 10 | Stephen Jones | (substituted off) 63' |
| SH | 9 | Tavis Knoyle | (substituted off) 58' |
| N8 | 8 | Taulupe Faletau | (substituted off) 57' |
| OF | 7 | Sam Warburton (c) | (substituted off) 49' |
| BF | 6 | Ryan Jones |
| RL | 5 | Alun Wyn Jones |
| LL | 4 | Bradley Davies |
| TP | 3 | Craig Mitchell |
| HK | 2 | Lloyd Burns | (substituted off) 61' |
| LP | 1 | Gethin Jenkins | (substituted off) 61' |
Replacements:
| HK | 16 | Ken Owens | (substituted on) 61' |
| PR | 17 | Ryan Bevington | (substituted on) 61' |
| LK | 18 | Luke Charteris | (substituted on) 57' |
| N8 | 19 | Andy Powell | (substituted on) 49' |
| SH | 20 | Lloyd Williams | (substituted on) 58' |
| FH | 21 | Rhys Priestland | (substituted on) 63' |
| WG | 22 | George North | (substituted on) 55' |
Coach:
(New Zealand) Warren Gatland

| FB | 15 | Chrysander Botha |
| RW | 14 | Danie van Wyk |
| OC | 13 | Piet van Zyl |
| IC | 12 | Darryl de la Harpe | | (substituted off) 33' |
| LW | 11 | Danie Dames | | (substituted off) 57' |
| FH | 10 | Theuns Kotzé | | (substituted off) 65' |
| SH | 9 | Eugene Jantjies |
| N8 | 8 | Jacques Nieuwenhuis | | | (substituted off) 59' | (substituted on) 70' |
| OF | 7 | Jacques Burger (c) |
| BF | 6 | Tinus du Plessis | | (substituted off) 71' |
| RL | 5 | Nico Esterhuyse |
| LL | 4 | Heinz Koll | | (substituted off) 65' |
| TP | 3 | Jané du Toit |
| HK | 2 | Hugo Horn | | (substituted off) 65' |
| LP | 1 | Johnny Redelinghuys | | (substituted off) 21' | (substituted on) 59' | (substituted off) 70' |
Replacements:
| HK | 16 | Bertus O'Callaghan | | (substituted on) 65' |
| PR | 17 | Raoul Larson | (yellow card) 59' | (substituted on) 21' |
| LK | 18 | Wacca Kazombiaze | | (substituted on) 65' |
| FL | 19 | Rohan Kitshoff | | (substituted on) 71' |
| SH | 20 | Ryan de la Harpe | | (substituted on) 65' |
| FH | 21 | Tertius Losper | | (substituted on) 57' |
| CE | 22 | David Philander | | (substituted on) 33' |
Coach:
Johan Diergaardt

Man of the Match:
Tinus du Plessis (Namibia)

Touch judges:
Alain Rolland (Ireland)
Carlo Damasco (Italy)
Television match official:
Giulio De Santis (Italy)

=== South Africa v Samoa ===
30 September 2011
20:30

| South Africa | 13–5 | Samoa |
| Try: Habana 9' c Con: M. Steyn (1/1); Pen: F. Steyn (1/3) 25'; M. Steyn (1/2) 27' | Report | Try: Stowers 51' m |

North Harbour Stadium, Auckland
Attendance: 29,734
Referee: Nigel Owens (Wales)

| FB | 15 | Patrick Lambie |
| RW | 14 | JP Pietersen |
| OC | 13 | Jaque Fourie |
| IC | 12 | François Steyn |
| LW | 11 | Bryan Habana | | (substituted off) 47' |
| FH | 10 | Morné Steyn |
| SH | 9 | Fourie du Preez |
| N8 | 8 | Pierre Spies | | | | (substituted off) 62' |
| BF | 7 | Schalk Burger |
| OF | 6 | Heinrich Brüssow |
| RL | 5 | Victor Matfield (c) |
| LL | 4 | Danie Rossouw | | 51' to 56' | | (substituted off) 74' |
| TP | 3 | Jannie du Plessis |
| HK | 2 | Bismarck du Plessis | | (substituted off) 69' | | (substituted on) 74' |
| LP | 1 | Tendai Mtawarira | | (substituted off) 62' |
Replacements:
| HK | 16 | John Smit | (yellow card) 71' | (substituted on) 69' |
| PR | 17 | Gurthrö Steenkamp | | (substituted on) 62' |
| PR | 18 | CJ van der Linde |
| FL | 19 | Willem Alberts | | (substituted on) 51' | (substituted off) 56' | (substituted on) 62' |
| FL | 20 | Francois Louw |
| SH | 21 | Francois Hougaard | | (substituted on) 47' | (substituted off) 51' |
| CE | 22 | Jean De Villiers | | | (substituted on) 51' |
Coach:
Peter de Villiers

| FB | 15 | Paul Williams | (red card) 70' |
| RW | 14 | David Lemi |
| OC | 13 | Seilala Mapusua |
| IC | 12 | Eliota Fuimaono Sapolu |
| LW | 11 | Alesana Tuilagi |
| FH | 10 | Tusi Pisi |
| SH | 9 | Kahn Fotuali'i |
| N8 | 8 | George Stowers |
| OF | 7 | Maurie Fa'asavalu |
| BF | 6 | Taiasina Tuifu'a | | (substituted off) 74' |
| RL | 5 | Kane Thompson |
| LL | 4 | Daniel Leo | | (substituted off) 61' |
| TP | 3 | Census Johnston | | (substituted off) 61' |
| HK | 2 | Mahonri Schwalger (c) | | (substituted off) 78' |
| LP | 1 | Sakaria Taulafo | | (substituted off) 78' |
Replacements:
| HK | 16 | Ole Avei | | (substituted on) 78' |
| PR | 17 | Anthony Perenise | | (substituted on) 61' |
| PR | 18 | Logovi'i Mulipola | | (substituted on) 78' |
| LK | 19 | Joe Tekori | | (substituted on) 61' |
| FL | 20 | Ofisa Treviranus | | (substituted on) 74' |
| SH | 21 | Junior Poluleuligaga |
| CE | 22 | George Pisi |
Coach:
Fuimaono Tafua

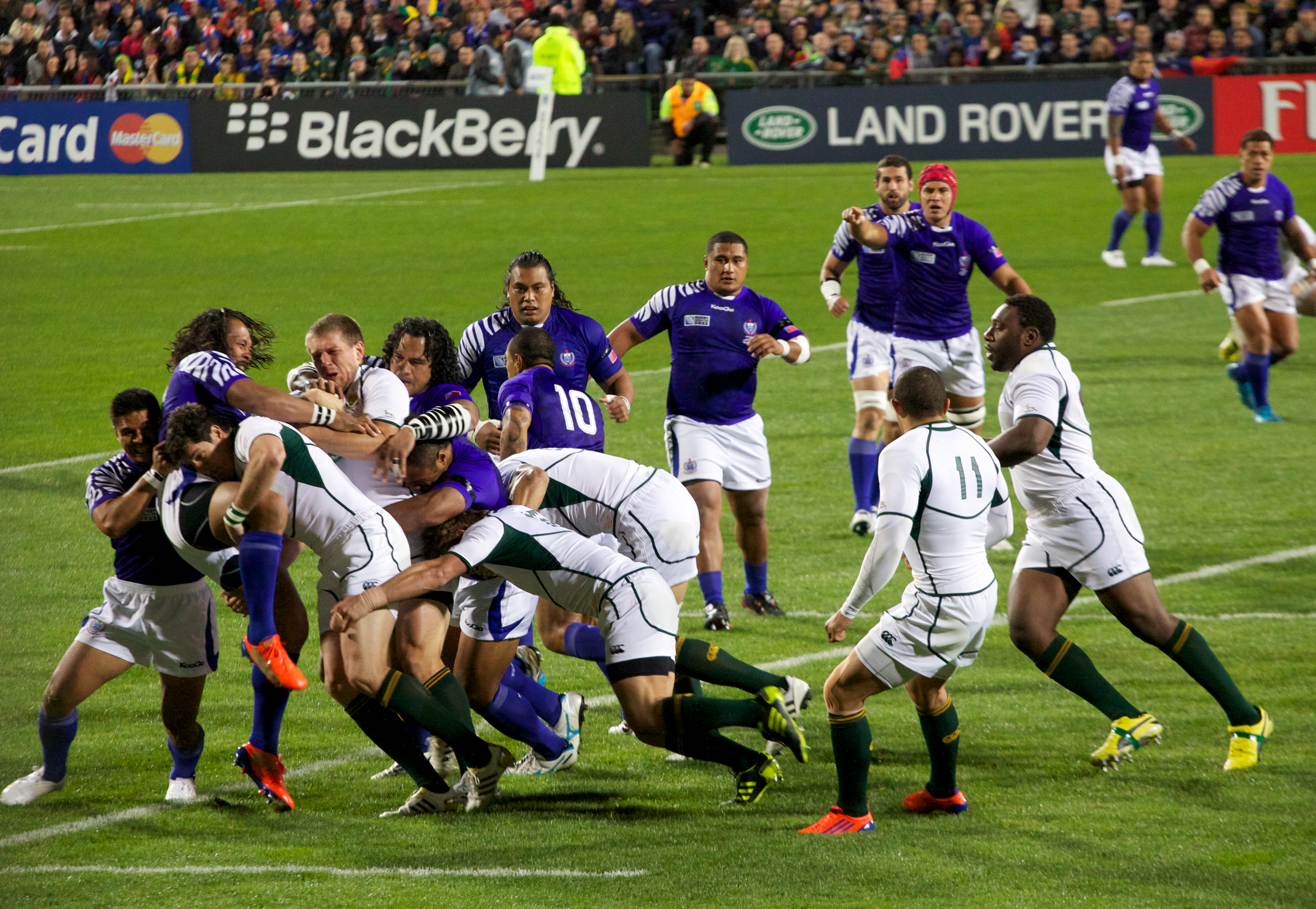
Match South Africa vs Samoa

Man of the Match:
Schalk Burger (South Africa)

Touch judges:
Wayne Barnes (England)
Stuart Terheege (England)
Television match official:
Graham Hughes (England)

=== Wales v Fiji ===
2 October 2011
18:00

| Wales | 66–0 | Fiji |
| Try: Roberts (2) 6' c, 51' c Sc. Williams 17' c North 32' c Warburton 39' c Burns 59' c Halfpenny 68' c L. Williams 73' c J. Davies 80+' c Con: Priestland (5/5); S. Jones (4/4); Pen: Priestland (1/1) 21' | Report |

Waikato Stadium, Hamilton
Attendance: 28,476
Referee: Wayne Barnes (England)

| FB | 15 | Lee Byrne |
| RW | 14 | Leigh Halfpenny |
| OC | 13 | Scott Williams |
| IC | 12 | Jamie Roberts | (substituted off) 65' |
| LW | 11 | George North |
| FH | 10 | Rhys Priestland | (substituted off) 59' |
| SH | 9 | Mike Phillips | (substituted off) 55' |
| N8 | 8 | Taulupe Faletau | (substituted off) 55' |
| OF | 7 | Sam Warburton (c) |
| BF | 6 | Ryan Jones |
| RL | 5 | Luke Charteris |
| LL | 4 | Bradley Davies | (substituted off) 40' |
| TP | 3 | Adam Jones | (substituted off) 59' | (substituted on) 74' |
| HK | 2 | Huw Bennett | (substituted off) 37' |
| LP | 1 | Gethin Jenkins | | (substituted off) 74' |
Replacements:
| HK | 16 | Lloyd Burns | (substituted on) 37' |
| PR | 17 | Paul James | (substituted on) 59' |
| LK | 18 | Alun Wyn Jones | (substituted on) 40' |
| N8 | 19 | Andy Powell | (substituted on) 55' |
| SH | 20 | Lloyd Williams | (substituted on) 55' |
| FH | 21 | Stephen Jones | (substituted on) 59' |
| CE | 22 | Jonathan Davies | (substituted on) 65' |
Coach:
(New Zealand) Warren Gatland

| FB | 15 | Iliesa Keresoni |
| RW | 14 | Albert Vulivuli | (substituted off) 69' |
| OC | 13 | Ravai Fatiaki |
| IC | 12 | Gabiriele Lovobalavu | (substituted off) 55' |
| LW | 11 | Michael Tagicakibau | (substituted off) 77' |
| FH | 10 | Nicky Little |
| SH | 9 | Vitori Buatava |
| N8 | 8 | Netani Talei (c) |
| OF | 7 | Sakiusa Matadigo | (substituted off) 55' |
| BF | 6 | Rupeni Nasiga | (substituted off) 62' |
| RL | 5 | Wame Lewaravu |
| LL | 4 | Leone Nakarawa |
| TP | 3 | Setefano Somoca | (substituted off) 52' | (substituted on) 66' |
| HK | 2 | Sunia Koto | (substituted off) 40' |
| LP | 1 | Waisea Daveta | | (substituted off) 66' |
Replacements:
| HK | 16 | Viliame Veikoso | (substituted on) 40' |
| PR | 17 | Campese Ma'afu | (substituted on) 52' |
| FL | 18 | Malakai Ravulo | (substituted on) 55' |
| FL | 19 | Akapusi Qera | (substituted on) 62' |
| SH | 20 | Nemia Kenatale | (substituted on) 77' |
| CE | 21 | Seremaia Bai | (substituted on) 55' |
| WG | 22 | Vereniki Goneva | (substituted on) 69' |
Coach:
Sam Domoni

Man of the Match:
George North (Wales)

Touch judges:
Craig Joubert (South Africa)
Stuart Terheege (England)
Television match official:
Graham Hughes (England)
