= Israel Dagg =

New Zealand international rugby union player (born 1988)

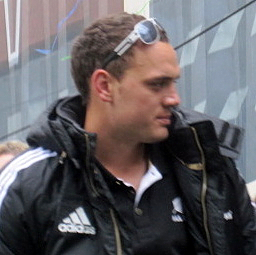
- Dagg during the World Cup celebration parade, October 2011
- Full name: Israel Jamahl Akuhata Dagg
- Born: 6 June 1988 (age 38) Marton, New Zealand
- Height: 186 cm (6 ft 1 in)
- Weight: 96 kg (212 lb; 15 st 2 lb)
- School: Lindisfarne College

Rugby union career
- Position(s): Fullback, Wing
Senior career
Years	Team	Apps	(Points)
2006–2017	Hawke's Bay	50	(86)
2009–2010	Highlanders	25	(133)
2011–2019	Crusaders	89	(140)
2018	Canon Eagles	3	(0)
- Correct as of 15 April 2019
International career
Years	Team	Apps	(Points)
2007	New Zealand U19	3	(11)
2009	Junior All Blacks	3	(5)
2010–2017	New Zealand	66	(138)
- Correct as of 15 April 2019
Medal record
Men's Rugby union
Representing New Zealand
Rugby World Cup
Gold medal – first place	2011 New Zealand	Squad

Israel Jamahl Akuhata Dagg (born 6 June 1988) is a former New Zealand rugby union player who played for the Crusaders in Super Rugby. He has also played for the New Zealand Sevens team, and represents Hawkes Bay in the ITM Cup.

Dagg played international rugby for New Zealand's All Blacks from 2010 to 2017, before repeated knee injuries cut his career short. Dagg scored 26 tries during his international career and is one of the most-capped outside backs in All Black history.

Dagg announced his retirement from rugby on 4 April 2019 in an Instagram post citing continued issues with an injury to his right knee. He has continued to be an integral member of the Crusaders' coaching and advisory staff. Following his untimely retirement, he joined the Sky Sport NZ rugby union commentary team.

== Early life ==
Dagg was born in Marton, New Zealand, and attended Lindisfarne College in Hastings, Hawke's Bay. Dagg is of Māori (Ngāti Kahungunu) and Samoan descent through his grandmother.

== Early career ==
While in high school, Dagg represented Hawke's Bay at under-16 and under-19 level. Dagg attended the Advanced Course at the International Rugby Academy (IRANZ) in April 2006. His course facilitator was former Wallabies coach, Dave Rennie, and former Otago, Otago Highlanders and New Zealand player Jeff Wilson. That year, he became the first secondary school player to be selected for Hawke's Bay since Danny Lee. The 2006 New Zealand Rugby Almanack named him one of its five promising players for 2006.

== International career ==
=== 2010 ===
Dagg made his All Blacks debut against Ireland in New Plymouth on 12 June 2010. He was again capped against Wales the following week, but was injured at half time.

Coach Graham Henry decided to rest him for the second test against Wales, giving veteran Mils Muliaina an opportunity. Muliaina was awarded the 15 jersey for the opening Tri Nations test against South Africa. A strong performance by the veteran, in the 32–12 result for the All Blacks, led to his being selected again for the rematch against the Springboks. Dagg was awarded a bench spot from which he emerged to score his first international try for the All Blacks. Dagg swerved between Schalk Burger and Pierre Spies before dancing his way to the try line. This try gave New Zealand the try bonus-point in the Investic Tri Nations as the All Blacks won 31–17.

Dagg's second test try came in dramatic circumstances against South Africa on 21 August 2010 at FNB Stadium near Soweto, Johannesburg. With the scores level at 22-all, in the last minute of play, Dagg backed up a break by Ma'a Nonu to score the game-winning try for a 29–22 result.

=== 2011 ===
In the pool rounds of the 2011 Rugby World Cup Dagg became one of the tournament's top try scorers. He scored the tournament's first try in the first half of the opening game against Tonga before adding another try before half time in the same game. His next try came in the 22nd minute of the All Blacks pool match against France. In total, he scored five tries in the tournament. That was the second most at the tournament.

Dagg's inclusion saw Mils Muliaina displaced from the All Blacks starting XV, with Muliaina only two caps away from his 100th test. Dagg played in the final against France, which the All blacks won.

Following the completion of the Rugby World Cup, the IRB's Rugby News Service listed Dagg as one of the Top 5 players of the 2011 Rugby World Cup.

=== 2012 ===
Dagg was named in the 30-man test squad to play Ireland in New Zealand. He started all three games at fullback. In the second match he received a yellow card for shoulder charging a kicker late. In the third match, he scored a try off a Sonny Bill Williams grubber kick. He also kicked a conversion while Aaron Cruden was injured. The All Blacks won the test series.

Dagg started in all of the 2012 Rugby Championship matches for the All Blacks. He scored in the first match of the Rugby Championship against the Wallabies. It came from a set piece move involving Dan Carter. He scored in the second match of the rugby championship against the Wallabies off a pass from Sonny Bill Williams. He scored his third try of the championship against South Africa from offloads by Sam Whitelock then Kieran Read. The All Blacks won the Bledisloe Cup and the Rugby Championship trophy.

On the end of year tour he started in the matches against Scotland, Wales and the All Blacks' only defeat of the year against England - injuring himself in the Scotland test which ruled him out for the Italy test and almost ruled him out for the Wales test.

=== 2013 ===
Dagg played in every single match of 2013 except for the match against Japan in Tokyo. He was on a try drought but was in some of his best form in setting up tries for his teammates as the All Blacks won every game that year to complete the first undefeated season.

=== 2014 ===
Dagg had injury trouble in the first test against England, ruling him out of the rest of the series. Regular right wing Ben Smith was used to cover Dagg's injuries and played so well that he took the fullback jersey for the first two Bledisloe tests. Dagg was the given another shot against Argentina in his home province and played well enough to shift Smith back to right wing for the rest of the rugby championship. Against England on the end of year tour, Dagg got shown up on defence by Jonny May and lost his fullback spot to Smith for the last test against Wales.

=== 2015 ===
Dagg had a major injury-plagued year in 2015, only managing 5 games for the Crusaders and 3 tests for the All Blacks causing Dagg to narrowly miss out on being picked for New Zealand's 2015 Rugby World Cup squad. Dagg subsequently returned to Hawke's Bay to play for the Magpies and scored a hat-trick against Otago, but was injured playing his 50th game. Dagg's latest injury required shoulder surgery, ruling him out for the rest of the Magpies' Mitre 10 cup-winning year.

=== 2016 ===
Dagg made a recovery from his shoulder injury, returning to the Crusaders for the 2016 Super Rugby season. Due to an injury to Nehe Milner-Skudder and his great form for the Crusaders (5 tries in his first 5 games), Dagg was then re-selected for New Zealand, being named in the 32-man squad for the All Blacks' three-match series against Wales. He played at fullback for two games, scoring tries in each.

Ben Smith was shifted back to fullback for the 2016 Rugby Championship, with Dagg moved out to wing for the series. Dagg scored 2 tries against Australia in Wellington on his debut as the right wing, allowing New Zealand to once again win the Bledisloe Cup.

He cemented his place as the All Blacks' first choice right wing, completing his comeback by finishing the competition as the joint highest try scorer with Ben Smith. The two players scored 5 tries each across the 6 matches played. He also notably kicked a 47-metre penalty against Argentina. On the end of year tour, he was rested for the first game against Ireland - the only game lost by the All Blacks that year - but he scored tries against Italy and France, the latter of which he returned to the fullback jersey with Smith out injured.

Dagg finished 2016 as the highest try-scorer of the year for the All Blacks, beating the team's new first-choice fly-half and World Rugby Player of The Year- Beauden Barrett and Ben Smith by one try. Dagg scored 10 in total from the 12 games he played in 2016.

=== 2017 ===
Despite missing a chunk of the Crusaders' Super Rugby winning campaign due to knee surgery in 2017, Dagg was retained as the first-choice right winger for the All Blacks' series against the British and Irish Lions and Pasifica Challenge against Samoa. Dagg scored a try in the 78–0 victory against Samoa and set up debutant Vaea Fifita for his first test try. Dagg was a standout performer against the Lions in the first test, which was a 30–15 victory and in the second test he was moved to fullback which was a historic 24–21 loss to the Lions. Dagg started the third test on the wing again as he surpassed Jonah Lomu and Sir John Kirwan as the second-to-most capped All Blacks winger, second only to former teammate Joe Rokocoko.

He missed the first two tests against Australia through injury but returned to play against Argentina and scored a try before being replaced as he had sustained a season-ending injury.

=== 2018 ===
Israel Dagg made just four appearances for the Crusaders in 2018, his season being cut short by a high tackle in May. In July, Dagg signed a short-term contract for Canon Eagles in Japan ruling himself out for the All Blacks for the rest of 2018. Dagg managed three games for Canon before his troublesome knee forced him to cut short his Japan stint.

=== 2019 ===
In April 2019, Dagg announced his retirement from rugby. Plagued by a long-term knee injury which had prevented him from starting the season, Dagg received medical advice to hang up his boots.

== Television ==
Dagg appeared in the New Zealand 2023 television series, Clubhouse Rescue alongside Stephen Donald and Hamish Dodd.

== Personal life ==
Dagg has been married to wife Daisy since 2015. They have two children, a son Arlo who was born in April 2017 and a daughter, Tilly born in May 2018. In 2015, he appeared in a Men in Black-themed safety ad for Air New Zealand with singer Stan Walker and actor Rip Torn.
