= Theuns Kotzé =

Namibia international rugby union player

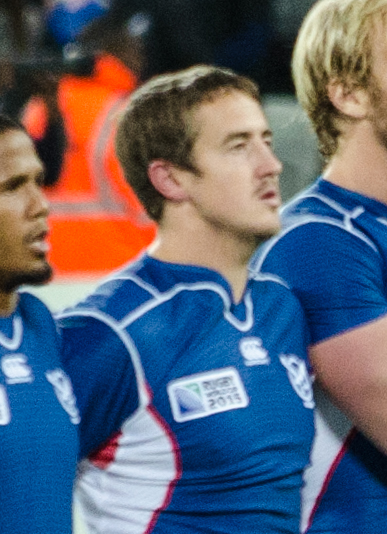
- Full name: Theuns Andries Willem Kotzé
- Born: 16 July 1987 (age 39) Karasburg, South-West Africa
- Height: 1.81 m (5 ft 11 1/2 in)
- Weight: 90 kg (198 lb; 14 st 2 lb)
- University: North West University; University of Johannesburg

Rugby union career
- Position: Utility back
Youth career
- 2005: Griquas
- 2006–2008: Leopards
Amateur team(s)
Years	Team	Apps	(Points)
2008–2010	NWU Pukke	16	(96)
2011–2012	UJ (Note: According to the match report on the Varsity Cup's official site, Kotzé scored a try in UJ's 93–0 victory over the TUT Vikings in the 2012 Varsity Cup – UJ's eighth try in the 65th minute of the match; however, the scorecard on the South African Rugby Union's website indicates that the try was scored by replacement scrum-half Jacques Pretorius.)	15	(107)
2013	Durbanville-Bellville	3	(29)
Senior career
Years	Team	Apps	(Points)
2010	Leopards	3	(0)
2011	Welwitschias	2	(12)
2012	SWD Eagles	7	(37)
2013–2014	Aix	19	(187)
2014–2015	Bourg-en-Bresse	13	(141)
2016	Boland Cavaliers	14	(90)
2017	Welwitschias	10	(98)
- Correct as of 5 June 2018
International career
Years	Team	Apps	(Points)
2011–2017	Namibia	40	(430)
- Correct as of 23 February 2021

Theuns Andries Willem Kotzé (born 16 July 1987) is a Namibian international rugby union player, currently playing with the Welwitschias in South African domestic rugby. He is a utility back that can play as a scrum-half, fly-half or fullback, but is best known for playing as a fly-half for Namibia in the Rugby World Cup tournaments in 2011 and 2015.

== Career ==
=== 2005: Schools rugby ===
Kotzé was born in South-West Africa – before the country gained independence from South Africa and was renamed Namibia – but grew up in Upington in South Africa's Northern Cape province. From there, he was selected to represent Griquas at the premier South African high schools competition, the Under-18 Craven Week, in 2005.

=== 2006–2010: Leopards / NWU Pukke ===
After school, Kotzé moved to Potchefstroom where he enrolled at North West University, also joining the Leopards rugby academy. In 2006, he played for Leopards U19 in the Under-19 Provincial Championship, before advancing to the Leopards U21 squad the following year.

In 2008, he represented university side NWU Pukke in the inaugural Varsity Cup tournament. He appeared as a replacement in the first ever match in the competition's history, a 23–17 win for the NWU Pukke against the UCT Ikey Tigers. That was his only appearance in the competition, but he once again represented the Leopards U21 side in the Provincial Championship in the latter half of the season.

He returned to Varsity Cup action in 2009, mainly playing as a scrum-half for NWU Pukke. He made four starts and two appearances as a replacement during the regular season, scoring a try and nine points with the boot in their 27–15 victory over UFS Shimlas. His team won five of their seven matches to finish in third position on the log to qualify for the semi-finals. He was an unused replacement in their 19–17 semi-final victory over UCT in Cape Town, but played off the bench in the final, as they lost 6–11 to the other Western Cape-based university, Maties.

Kotzé established himself as the first-choice full-back and goal-kicker for NWU Pukke during the 2010 Varsity Cup. He started all eight of their matches in the competition, scoring two tries and kicking 67 points to finish the competition as the leading points scorer. Despite this, his side only reached the semi-finals of the competition, where they were eliminated by eventual champions Maties.

In September 2010, Kotzé made his first class debut by coming on as a replacement for the Leopards in their 17–59 defeat to Western Province in the 2010 Currie Cup Premier Division. He made his first start three weeks later against the Sharks in Durban and made his home debut in their next match against the Free State Cheetahs in Rustenburg. It was a disappointing season for the Leopards, however, as they lost all fourteen of their matches in the competition to finish bottom of the log.

=== 2011: UJ / Welwitschias ===
At the start of 2011, Kotzé once again played in the Varsity Cup, but this time in the colours of Johannesburg-based university side UJ. He started all eight of their matches – mainly in the fly-half position – helping them to six wins in their seven matches to finish top of the log during the regular season, before losing to UP Tuks in the semi-finals. Despite improving on the 77 points he scored in 2010 to be the tournament top scorer, getting 82 points for UJ in 2011, he finished third in the points-scoring charts behind Demetri Catrakilis and Wesley Dunlop.

At the conclusion of the 2011 Varsity Cup, he joined up with Namibian side Welwitschias' Vodacom Cup squad. Kotzé played off the bench in a 33–71 defeat to Boland Cavaliers and started their home match against Argentine side Pampas XV a week later, scoring a try in each of those matches, as well kicking a conversion in the first match.

=== 2011: Rugby World Cup ===
After making his international debut for Namibia against Portugal on 15 June 2011, scoring 19 points in a 29–23 victory, Kotzé was named in the Namibia squad for the 2011 Rugby World Cup to be held in New Zealand and started as Namibia's fly-half in all four of their matches in Pool D. After kicking fifteen points in their opening match in the competition, a 25–49 loss to Fiji, he scored one try and one conversion in their 12–49 loss to Samoa in the second match. They faced African rivals South Africa in their third match, which the defending champions won 87–0, and suffered another big defeat in their final match against Wales, going down 7–81, with Kotzé converting a Heinz Koll try. With four defeats out of four, Namibia finished bottom of Pool D to be eliminated from the competition.

=== 2012: UJ ===
He returned to domestic action at the start of 2012, to play in his fifth Varsity Cup season. He started in six of UJ's seven matches during the regular season, which included a 93–0 win over TUT Vikings during which Kotzé converted eleven of the twelve tries scored in the match for a personal points haul of 33 points in the match. UJ finished in third position on the log and qualified for a semi-final match against Maties, but suffered a 0–23 loss to be eliminated from the competition.

=== 2012: SWD Eagles ===
After appearing for Namibia in their matches against Senegal and hosts Madagascar in Group 1B of the Africa Cup, Kotzé joined the George-based SWD Eagles for the 2012 Currie Cup First Division. He appeared for them in seven consecutive matches in the competition; five starts and twice as a replacement. He also scored a try in their 33–27 victory over the Border Bulldogs and kicked 32 points for his side. The SWD Eagles eventually finished in fifth position on the log, missing out on the play-offs.

Kotzé then returned to Namibia, where he played in two more international matches – against Zimbabwe and Spain respectively.

=== 2013: Durbanville-Bellville ===
Kotzé then joined Cape Town-based club side Durbanville-Bellville, one of two teams that represented Western Province Rugby Union in the inaugural SARU Community Cup competition. Kotzé appeared in three of their matches in the competition, scoring a total of 29 points in their matches against Pretoria Police, African Bombers and Bloemfontein Police to help Durbanville-Bellville qualify for the quarter-finals, where they eventually won the Bowl competition, effectively finishing in 5th position.

=== 2013–2014: Aix / 2015 Rugby World Cup qualification ===
Kotzé then moved to France, where he joined an Aix team that was recently relegated from the Pro D2 to the Fédérale 1. He appeared in sixteen of their eighteen matches during the regular season to help them finish in third position in Pool 2 in the competition to qualify for the play-off phase of the competition. He started both legs of their Last 16 tie against FC Oloron and came on as a replacement in their quarter-final second-leg match against Massy, which they lost 14–34 to remain in the league for 2014–15. Kotzé scored 187 points for Aix during the season, scoring two tries, 47 penalties and 18 conversions.

During his time at Aix, he also made two appearances for Namibia in matches against Zimbabwe and Kenya in November 2013. He also played for Namibia at the 2014 Africa Cup, where they were promoted to Division 1A, the top tier of the competition, which also doubled up as the final qualification phase of the African qualification series for the 2015 Rugby World Cup. Kotzé played in all three their matches against Kenya, Zimbabwe and hosts Madagascar. Kotzé converted twelve of Namibia's thirteen tries that they scored in their final match, an 89–10 victory over Madagascar, to seal a place for Namibia in the Rugby World Cup in dramatic fashion as they won the title on points difference from Kenya and Zimbabwe after all three sides finished level on log points.

=== 2014–2015: Bourg-en-Bresse ===
For the 2014–15 season, he joined another team that was recently relegated from the Pro D2 to the Fédérale 1, Bourg-en-Bresse. He started thirteen matches for them, scoring 141 points through two tries, 37 penalties and ten conversions to help them finish in fourth position on the Pool 2 log to qualify for the play-offs. However, for the second year in a row, Kotzé tasted defeat in the play-offs, with Bourg-en-Bresse losing to Vannes in the Last 16 on this occasion.

Kotzé was once again involved with the Namibian national team during his time at Bourg-en-Bresse. He played for them in an international match against Germany in Windhoek and also played in matches during their European tour, where they lost to Canada in Colwyn Bay, Wales and to Portugal in Lisbon.

=== 2015: Rugby World Cup ===
As part of Namibia's preparation for the 2015 Rugby World Cup, Kotzé played in several matches in the run-up to the tournament; he played in all three of their matches in the 2015 Africa Cup – helping them win all three to retain the title they won in 2014 – as well as matches against Spain in Romania and two matches against Russia in Windhoek.

He also featured in all three of Namibia's matches in Pool C of the Rugby World Cup. He kicked three penalties in their 14–58 defeat to defending champions New Zealand in their opening match and converted all three of the tries that his side scored against Tonga in their 21–35 defeat in their second match. He scored all of Namibia's 16 points (one converted try and three penalties) in their match against Georgia as his side fell just short of their first ever victory in a Rugby World Cup match, losing 16–17, in the process also becoming Namibia's all-time top points scorer and their top points scorer in a Rugby World Cup tournament. He also kicked two conversions in their final match, which ended in a 19–64 defeat to Argentina.

=== 2016–present: Boland Cavaliers / Kings ===
After the 2015 Rugby World Cup, it was announced that Kotzé would return to South Africa to join the Boland Cavaliers prior to the 2016 Currie Cup season. Shortly after being officially announced as a Boland Cavaliers player, he was also given a contract by Port Elizabeth-based side the Southern Kings to play for them during the 2016 Super Rugby season.
