= Chrysander Botha =

Namibia international rugby union player

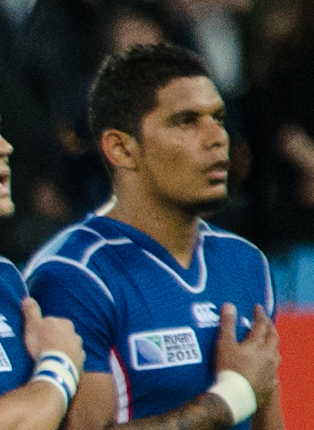
- Full name: Chrysander Antonio Botha
- Born: 13 July 1988 (age 38) Walvis Bay, South Africa (Note: In 1988, Walvis Bay was a South African exclave, but is part of modern-day Namibia.)
- Height: 1.88 m (6 ft 2 in)
- Weight: 78 kg (172 lb; 12 st 4 lb)
- School: Narraville Primary School; Walvis Bay High
- University: Boland College; University of Johannesburg

Rugby union career
- Position: Fullback
Youth career
- 2005–2006: Welwitschias U18
Amateur team(s)
Years	Team	Apps	(Points)
2005–2010	Kudu Rugby Club		
Senior career
Years	Team	Apps	(Points)
2010–2011	Welwitschias	15	(136)
2010	Falcons	11	(24)
2012–2013	UJ	16	(55)
2013–2014	Golden Lions XV	9	(37)
2013–2014	Lions	11	(0)
2013	Golden Lions	6	(0)
2014–2016	Exeter Chiefs	6	(5)
2016	Welwitschias	5	(5)
2017	Southern Kings	2	(0)
2017	Eastern Province Kings	3	(0)
2018–2019	Welwitschias		
- Correct as of 26 June 2018
International career
Years	Team	Apps	(Points)
2005	Namibia U18		
2007–2008	Namibia U20		
2008–2018	Namibia	55	(215)
- Correct as of 16 November 2018
Coaching career
- Years: Team
- 2022: Namibia U20
- 2022–2024: Namibia (Assistant Coach)
- 2024: Kudu Rugby Club (Technical Advisor)
- 2024–2025: Namibia

Chrysander Antonio Botha (born 13 July 1988) is the current Head Coach of the Namibia, for whom he previously played and is the top try scorer for. He played full-back for the Welwitschias in the South African Rugby Challenge competition.

== Playing career ==
Botha first started playing rugby for Narraville Primary School in Walvis Bay, but as a youngster, Botha preferred football and was selected for the Namibian Under-17s football team that toured Germany in 2004 while he also represented Namibia in an African Youth Cup competition against Burundi.

However, after representing Namibia in Craven Week in 2005, Botha turned to focus on rugby union and began to break into the first team at Kudu Rugby Club.

His performances in Craven Week saw Botha selected for Namibia Under-18s and later Namibia Under-19s, before being selected for Namibia Under-20s in the inaugural IRB Junior World Rugby Trophy in 2008, seeing Namibia finish in fifth place.

Following the Junior World Rugby Trophy in June 2008, Botha earned his first senior cap in August 2008 against Zimbabwe during the 2011 Rugby World Cup African qualification process.

During this period he continued to play for Kudu Rugby Club in the Namibian Premier League, before playing for the Welwitschias in the Vodacom Cup in 2018. He later went onto play professionally for the Falcons in South Africa's Currie Cup First Division.

In 2011, Botha was selected for the 2011 Rugby World Cup, an accolade he again achieved in 2015.

After the 2011 Rugby World Cup, Botha was signed by the University of Johannesburg, and played in the Varsity Cup, showcasing his talent at the university level. His talents during the Varsity Cup saw Botha join the Golden Lions in 2013, where he participated in the Vodacom Cup and Currie Cup. He also played in the promotion/relegation matches that secured the Lions' spot in the 2014 Super Rugby season.

He made his Super Rugby debut during that season against the Cheetahs, in Bloemfontein which saw the Lions win 21–20.

Later that year, he signed for Premiership Rugby side Exeter Chiefs in England, scoring a try on his debut. However, injuries limited his appearances to six matches over two seasons and he returned to Namibia to play for the Welwitschias and a brief stint with the Southern Kings in Super Rugby in 2017.

Ahead of retiring from playing rugby in 2019, Botha earned his 50th international cap in 2018, and helped secure qualification for his national side in the 2019 Rugby World Cup.

== Coaching career ==
In 2022, Botha became the head coach for the Namibian U20 side, before later joining Allister Coetzee with the national mens side as assistant coach.

Botha was later promoted to head coach of the national side in November 2024, replacing Coetzee, but later stood down on 20 June 2025 due to increased work commitments. His only game in charge was a 22–19 win over Uganda in friendly match ahead of the final stage of African qualification for the 2027 Men's Rugby World Cup.

== Notes ==
Sporting positions
Preceded by (South Africa) Allister Coetzee	Namibia National Rugby Union Coach; 2024–2025	Succeeded by (Namibia) Jacques Burger
