= Francois Hougaard =

South African rugby union player

- Born: 6 April 1988 (age 38) Paarl, Cape Province, Republic of South Africa
- Height: 1.81 m (5 ft 11 1/2 in)
- Weight: 93 kg (205 lb; 14 st 9 lb)
- School: Paul Roos Gymnasium

Rugby union career
- Position: Scrum-half / Wing
Senior career
Years	Team	Apps	(Points)
2007	Western Province	3	(0)
2008–2015	Bulls	88	(130)
2009	Southern Kings	1	(0)
2008–2015	Blue Bulls	48	(80)
2016–2021	Worcester Warriors	92	(95)
2021-2022	Wasps	14	(15)
2023–	Saracens	1	(5)
- Correct as of 31 January 2022
International career
Years	Team	Apps	(Points)
2008–2009	South Africa U20	3	(0)
2009–2017	South Africa (test)	46	(25)
2009–2010	South Africa (tour)	3	(0)
2015–	South Africa Sevens		
- Correct as of 19 September 2017
Medal record
Men's rugby sevens
Representing South Africa
Olympic Games
Bronze medal – third place	2016 Rio de Janeiro	Team competition

Francois Hougaard (born 6 April 1988) is a South African professional rugby union player. His primary position is scrum-half, but he can also play wing.

== Club career ==
Hougaard played for Western Province in 2007 before joining the Blue Bulls; he spent eight seasons at the Pretoria-based team, representing them in the Currie Cup as well as playing Super Rugby for the Bulls.

Hougaard scored a try in the Currie Cup final win 36–24 against the Free State Cheetahs (3rd min) following a superb crosskick from Fourie du Preez for his first final at 21 (the youngest player in the starting line) wearing the number 14 jersey.

In the 2011 Super Rugby season, Hougaard showed great promise, adapting to his self-proclaimed preferred position of scrum half in the absence of Fourie Du Preez, very well, and as a result, landed a position in the Springbok World Cup Squad for the 2011 tournament. At school he played for Paul Roos Gymnasium.

In February 2016, Hougaard signed a short-term contract with English Premiership club Worcester Warriors for the remainder of the 2015–2016 season. He made his debut for his new side in their match against Sale Sharks, marking the occasion by scoring a try in a 31–23 victory and also put in a man-of-the-match performance in their 15–14 victory over the Newcastle Falcons two weeks later. On 15 March 2016, it was announced that Hougaard signed a permanent contract with the team, but would be allowed to link up with the South African sevens team to participate at the 2016 Summer Olympics in Rio de Janeiro.

Hougaard left Worcester Warriors to join Premiership rivals Wasps ahead of the 2021–22 season. He was made redundant along with every other Wasps player and coach when the team entered administration on 17 October 2022.

== International career ==
Hougaard represented South Africa between 2009 and 2014 and joined the South African Sevens team in 2015.

His first tour with the Springboks was to France, Italy, Ireland and England in late 2009 where he played in one test against Italy on 21 November 2009 and two touring matches. Hougaard helped his team to win both the Currie Cup in 2009, and the Super Rugby title in 2010, scoring tries in both finals

At the 2011 Rugby World Cup Hougaard was selected and joined off the bench for South Africa's opening match scoring in the 65th minute in a 17–16 win over Wales. He was however dropped for the second game against Fiji which South Africa won 49-3 but started against Namibia in which he scored two tries and came off the bench against Samoa. South Africa was however knocked out of the Cup, losing 11–9 to Australia. Hougaard came on in the 50th minute during that match.

Hougaard started all five games at scrum half against England and Argentina and scored one try against England. However, he was moved to the wing and his place at scrum half taken by the talented Ruan Pienaar in the first Championship Test against Australia on 8 September 2012.

Hougaard signed a one-season contract with SA Rugby to represent the Blitzboks in the HSBC World Rugby Sevens Series and at the Rio Olympics. Played in the first four legs of the 2015/16 series and scored the winning try in the 3rd/4th playoff against Australia at the Dubai Sevens.

Hougaard was a member of the South African Sevens team that won a bronze medal at the 2016 Summer Olympics. During the 2016 Summer Olympics in Rio de Janeiro Hougaard was included as a travelling reserve, but was included on the bench for the final day of the Rugby sevens tournament after Seabelo Senatla injured his wrist during the pool stages. After the medal ceremony Hougaard offered his Bronze medal to Senatla, stating that: "he deserves it more".

== International statistics ==
=== Test Match record ===
Against	P	W	D	L	Tri	Pts	%Won
Argentina	5	4	1	0	0	0	80
Australia	11	4	1	6	0	0	36.36
England	5	4	1	0	1	5	80
Fiji	1	1	0	0	0	0	100
France	3	3	0	0	0	0	100
Ireland	2	1	0	1	0	0	50
Italy	2	2	0	0	0	0	100
Namibia	1	1	0	0	2	10	100
New Zealand	9	2	0	7	1	5	22.22
Samoa	1	1	0	0	0	0	100
Scotland	3	2	0	1	0	0	66.67
Wales	3	2	0	1	1	5	66.67
Total	46	27	3	16	5	25	58.7

Pld = Games Played, W = Games Won, D = Games Drawn, L = Games Lost, Tri = Tries Scored, Pts = Points Scored

=== International tries ===
Try	Opposing team	Location	Venue	Competition	Date	Result	Score
1	Wales	Wellington, New Zealand	Wellington Regional Stadium	2011 Rugby World Cup	11 September 2011	Win	17–16
2	Namibia	Auckland, New Zealand	North Harbour Stadium	2011 Rugby World Cup	22 September 2011	Win	87–0
3	Namibia	Auckland, New Zealand	North Harbour Stadium	2011 Rugby World Cup	22 September 2011	Win	87–0
4	England	Johannesburg, South Africa	Ellis Park Stadium	2012 England tour of South Africa	16 June 2012	Win	36–27
5	New Zealand	Johannesburg, South Africa	Ellis Park Stadium	2014 Rugby Championship	4 October 2014	Win	27–25
