= Bertus O'Callaghan =

Namibia international rugby union player

- Born: 18 February 1988 (age 38) Windhoek
- Height: 5 ft 11.3 in (1.81 m)
- Weight: 108 kg (238 lb)

Rugby union career
- Position: Hooker
International career
Years	Team	Apps	(Points)
2010–present	Namibia	11	(0)

Bertus O'Callaghan (born 18 February 1988) is a Namibian rugby union player. He competed with the Namibian national team at the 2011 Rugby World Cup. He was born in Windhoek.
