= Kane Thompson =

Samoa international rugby union player

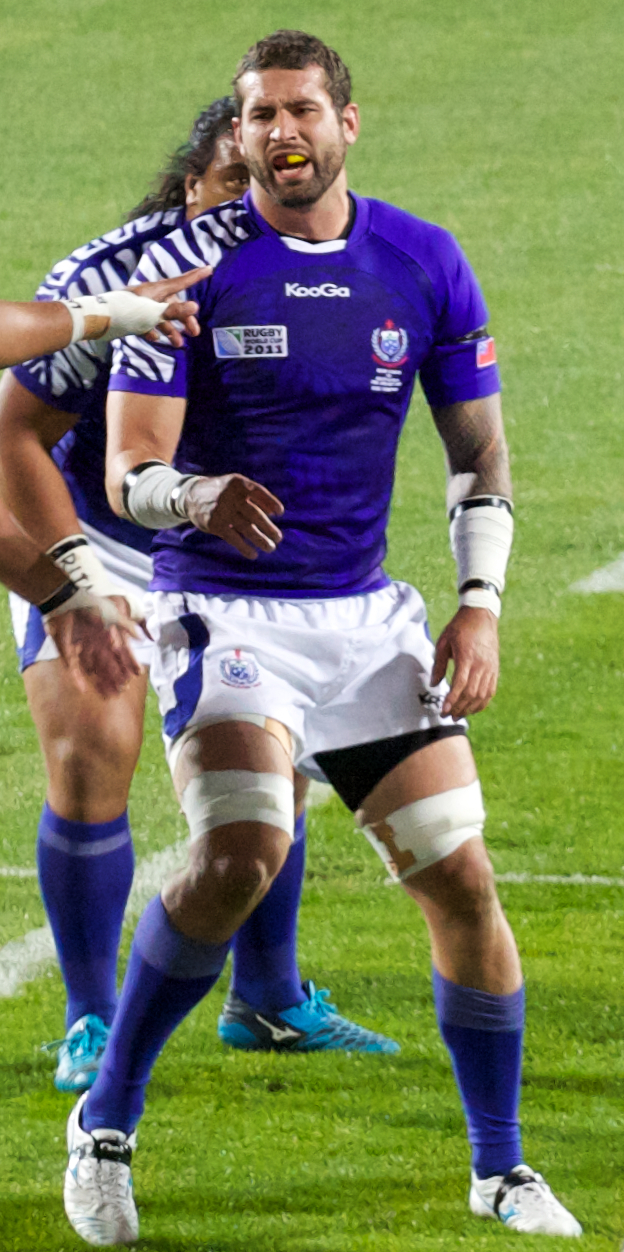
- Full name: Kane Gregory Thompson
- Born: 9 January 1982 (age 44) Wellington, New Zealand
- Height: 1.98 m (6 ft 6 in)
- Weight: 112 kg (17 st 9 lb; 247 lb)
- School: Wellington College

Rugby union career
- Position(s): Lock, Number 8
- Current team: Taranaki
Senior career
Years	Team	Apps	(Points)
2002–2005	Wellington	7	(0)
2005–2007	Southland	22	(10)
2006–2007	Highlanders	14	(5)
2007–2010	Dax	64	(10)
2010	Southland	13	(5)
2011	Hawke's Bay	5	(0)
2012	Chiefs	13	(5)
2012	Canon Eagles	4	(0)
2014	Chiefs	6	(0)
2014–2016	Newcastle Falcons	20	(0)
2016	Manawatu	7	(0)
2017–2018	Taranaki	12	(0)
2018–2021	New Orleans Gold		
- Correct as of 29 July 2018
International career
Years	Team	Apps	(Points)
2002–2003	New Zealand U21	8	(0)
2007–2015	Samoa	36	(10)
- Correct as of 10 October 2015

Kane Gregory Thompson (born 9 January 1982) is a New Zealand-born rugby union coach and former player who played for the Samoa national rugby union team. He played professionally for several teams in New Zealand and in Europe during his 19-year playing career. He retired from playing in 2021, and has since served as head coach for NOLA Gold in Major League Rugby (MLR).

== Playing career ==
Thompson debuted for the Highlanders in 2006. He showed he was well capable of stepping up to the higher level and he had a strong 2006/ 2007 season for the Highlanders and Southland. In 2007 he represented Manu Samoa at the Rugby World Cup and went on to represent U.S. Dax in the Top 14 in France. Kane represented Samoa at the 2011 Rugby World Cup before taking up a contract with Chiefs in 2012, who became Super Rugby champions in that year.

He played for the Chiefs in the 2012 Super Rugby, joining national teammate Mahonri Schwalger.

On 17 July 2014, Thompson signed for Newcastle Falcons who compete in the English Aviva Premiership from the 2014–15 season.

Kane also represented Samoa in the 2015 Rugby World Cup in England.

Kane then went on to play for Manawatu in 2016, before moving on to play for Taranaki in 2017, 2018 before moving to play for NOLA Gold in the MLR Competition

== Coaching ==
Thompson served as player-coach for NOLA Gold in Major League Rugby, serving as forwards and defensive coach. He was named head coach in December 2021 ahead of the 2022 season. Thompson was named as assistant coach of Samoa in 2024 after a brief coaching stint with them in 2016 and 2021
