= Jacques Burger =

Namibia international rugby union player

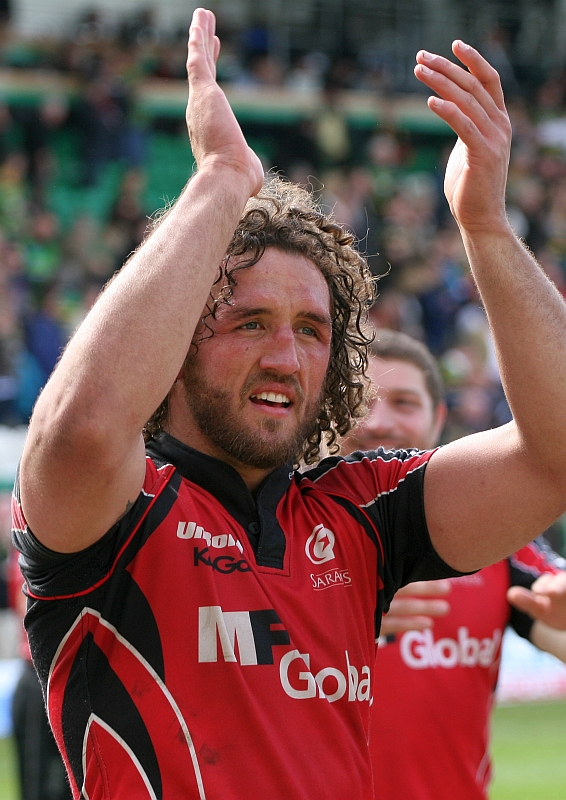
- Born: 29 July 1983 (age 43) Windhoek, South West Africa
- Height: 1.88 m (6 ft 2 in)
- Weight: 105 kg (231 lb; 16 st 7 lb)
- School: Windhoek High School

Rugby union career
- Position: Flanker
Senior career
Years	Team	Apps	(Points)
2005–07	Wildeklawer Griquas	29	(20)
2007–08	Aurillac	28	(5)
2008–10	Blue Bulls	25	(10)
2010–16	Saracens	100	(10)
- Correct as of 28 August 2015
Super Rugby
Years	Team	Apps	(Points)
2008–10	Bulls	2	(0)
- Correct as of 15 July 2013
International career
Years	Team	Apps	(Points)
2004–15	Namibia	41	(40)
- Correct as of 7 October 2015

Jacques Burger (born 29 July 1983 in Windhoek, South West Africa) is a retired Namibian rugby union loose forward who finished his career at Saracens in the Aviva Premiership. He is currently the Director of Rugby for his former national team.

== Club career ==
He played for Saracens, having joined them in the 2009/10 season, and played until the end of the 2015/16 season. The back row quickly earned a reputation as one of the toughest tacklers in the English Premiership following his arrival midway through the 2009/10 season – being named the Saracens Player of the Year in 2010/11.. During his time at Saracens he won two Premiership titles in 2011 and 2015. Burger started both finals. He retired from professional rugby at the end of the 2015/2016 season.

He has previously played for the Bulls. He played in France, in Aurillac in the 2007/08 season. Burger was brought in by Brendan Venter as a replacement for Wikus van der Heerden, who returned to South Africa.

== International career ==
He was captain of the Namibia national rugby union team and made his international debut against Zambia in 2004. He participated with the squad at the 2007 Rugby World Cup and 2011 Rugby World Cup. At the 2011 Rugby World Cup, the IRB's Rugby News Service listed Jacques Burger as one of the top 5 players of the tournament. Rugby News Service stated that Burger was "consistently the shining light in his side" and that "even as opposition scores mounted, the 28-year-old continued to tirelessly throw himself into the tackle and threaten turnover ball in the rucks."

Following a concussion versus Georgia in the 2015 Rugby World Cup Burger announced his retirement from international rugby.

== Private life ==
Burger resides in Stampriet. He works on the family farm, raising livestock.
