= Kahn Fotuali'i =

Samoa international rugby union player

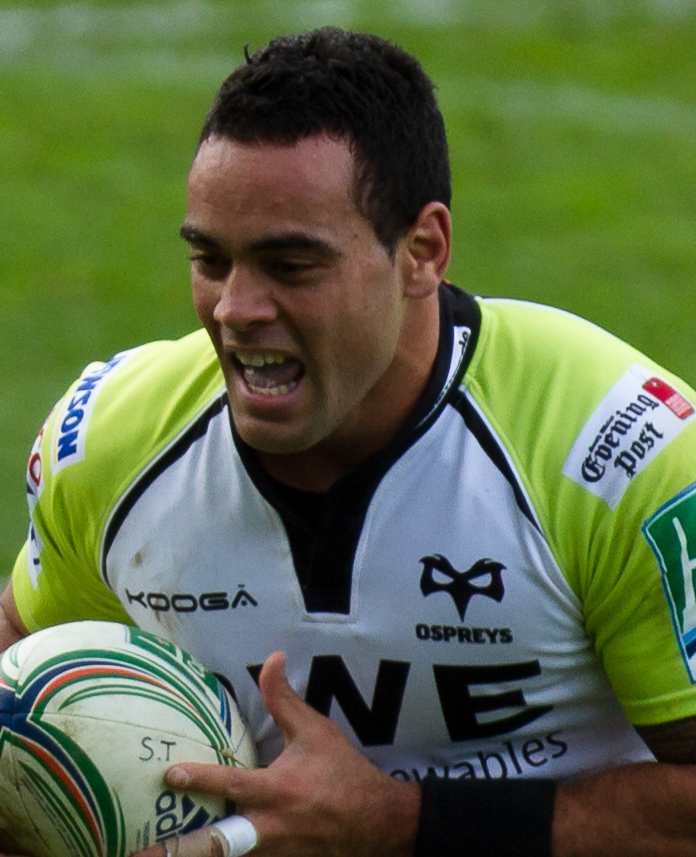
- Kahn playing for Ospreys in the Heineken Cup
- Born: Khan Faasega Fotuali'i; 22 May 1982 (age 44) Auckland, New Zealand
- Height: 184 cm (6 ft 0 in)
- Weight: 94 kg (14 st 11 lb; 207 lb)
- School: Onehunga High School

Rugby union career
- Position: Scrum-half
Senior career
Years	Team	Apps	(Points)
2011–2013	Ospreys	47	(43)
2013–2016	Northampton	61	(43)
2016-2019	Bath	63	(5)
2019–	Montpellier	9	(0)
- Correct as of 16 December 2019
Provincial / State sides
Years	Team	Apps	(Points)
2004–2009	Tasman	38	(38)
2010–2011	Hawke's Bay	18	(27)
Super Rugby
Years	Team	Apps	(Points)
2008–2011	Crusaders	28	(33)
International career
Years	Team	Apps	(Points)
2011–	Samoa	35	(28)
- Correct as of 17 July 2017

Kahn Fotuali'i (born 22 May 1982) is a former Samoan rugby union player. During his long career he played for clubs across the globe in New Zealand, Wales, England, USA and in France with Montpellier in the Top 14. He played as a scrum-half.

== Career ==
In 2002, he played with New Haven Rugby in the United States and led the club to a Division II national championship playing primarily at #10. In 2004, he debuted for Nelson Bays, who later merged with Marlborough to form the Tasman Rugby Union. In 2008, he made his Crusaders debut. Fotuali'i had a successful year in 2010 scoring five tries for the Crusaders and starting most games ahead of All Blacks halfback Andy Ellis until he was suspended for breaking Crusaders protocol. However, from his impressive form on the field for the Crusaders many thought Fotuali'i would be very close to All Black selection.

In 2010, Fotuali'i chose to represent Samoa for their 2010 end-of-year tour. He made his debut for them against Japan where he scored Samoa's only try to win the game 13-10 and was man of the match.

He signed a two-year deal with Welsh side Ospreys ahead of the 2011/12 season. He scored his first try for the Ospreys against Glasgow Warriors in a 20–26 defeat.

Early in 2013, he was still with Ospreys, but there was speculation that he might join another club in Europe. He rejected a new deal by the Ospreys and signed for Northampton Saints on 24 January 2013. In 2014 he started as Northampton beat Saracens to win the Premiership final.

Towards the end of the 2015/16 season, whilst at Northampton Saints it was rumoured that he had signed for another premiership team, Bath Rugby. At the Saints last game of the season, at Gloucester, this was confirmed.

On September 3, 2016, Kahn Fotuali'i made his Bath Rugby debut against his former Northampton Saints team, with Bath winning the match 18–14 at Northampton for the first time in 16 years.

On 28 June 2019, Fotuali'i signed a one-year contract to join French side Montpellier in the Top 14 for the 2019–20 season.
