= Danie van Wyk =

Namibian rugby union player

- Full name: Daniel Nicholaas van Wyk
- Born: 30 March 1986 (age 40) Aranos, Namibia
- Height: 1.88 m (6 ft 2 in)
- Weight: 91 kg (201 lb; 14 st 5 lb)

Rugby union career
- Position: Centre
International career
Years	Team	Apps	(Points)
2011–2015	Namibia	16	(5)
- Correct as of 7 October 2015

Daniel Nicholaas van Wyk (born 30 March 1986) is a former Namibian rugby union player. Danie was included in the Namibian squad for the 2011 Rugby World Cup. and was named in Namibia's squad for the 2015 Rugby World Cup.
