= Raoul Larson =

Namibian rugby union player

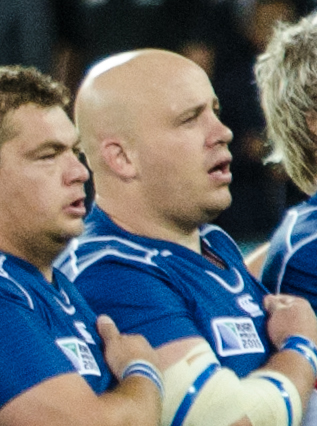
- Full name: Raoul Jonathan Larson
- Born: 14 May 1984 (age 42) Katima Mulilo, Namibia
- Height: 1.85 m (6 ft 1 in)
- Weight: 120 kg (260 lb; 18 st 13 lb)
- School: Grey College, Bloemfontein

Rugby union career
- Position: Prop
- Current team: SWD Eagles
Youth career
- 1997: Eastern Province
- 2004–2005: Free State Cheetahs
Senior career
Years	Team	Apps	(Points)
2006–2007	Free State Cheetahs	16	(0)
2007	Griffons	9	(0)
2008	Stade Montois	6	(0)
2008–2009	FC Lourdes	16	(0)
2009	Mighty Elephants	9	(0)
2010	Boland Cavaliers	7	(0)
2012–present	SWD Eagles	19	(0)
- Correct as of 28 August 2015
International career
Years	Team	Apps	(Points)
2011–present	Namibia	8	(0)
- Correct as of 7 October 2015

Raoul Jonathan Larson (born 14 May 1984 in Katima Mulilo, Namibia) is a Namibian rugby union player. He competed with the Namibian national team at the 2011 Rugby World Cup where he played in three matches. He is again included in the Namibian national team at the 2015 Rugby World Cup.
