= George Stowers =

Samoa international rugby union player

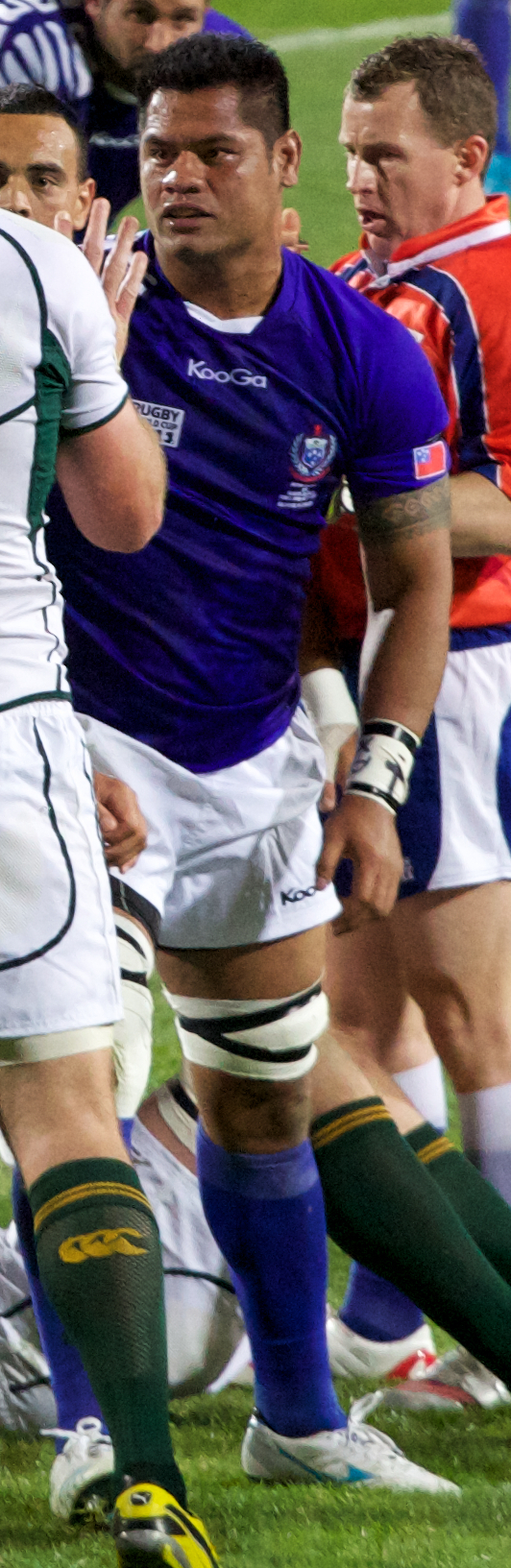
- South Africa vs Samoa at 2011 Rugby World Cup
- Born: 14 February 1979 (age 47) Apia, Samoa
- Height: 1.92 m (6 ft 4 in)
- Weight: 117 kg (18 st 6 lb)
- School: St Joseph's College, Samoa.

Rugby union career
- Position(s): No.8, Flanker
Senior career
Years	Team	Apps	(Points)
-2001	Pukekohe		
2002–09	World Fighting Bull		
2009–11	London Irish	44	(30)
2011–13	Ospreys	29	(5)
2013–	Kahurangi		
Provincial / State sides
Years	Team	Apps	(Points)
1999–2000	Counties Manukau		
2013–	Tasman	6	(0)
- Correct as of 25 October 2013
International career
Years	Team	Apps	(Points)
2001–11	Samoa	23	(25)
2008	Pacific Islanders	1	(0)

George Stowers (born 14 February 1979) is a Samoan international rugby union player. He plays as a Flanker or a No.8.

== Club career ==
In 2002, Stowers signed for World after his international career began to take route. In 2009, Stowers signed for London Irish.

== International career ==
Stowers made his debut in 2001 against Ireland but had to wait till 2008 for his next cap, which came in the 2008 IRB Pacific Nations Cup against Fiji in a 34–17 loss.
