= Anthony Perenise =

Samoa international rugby union player

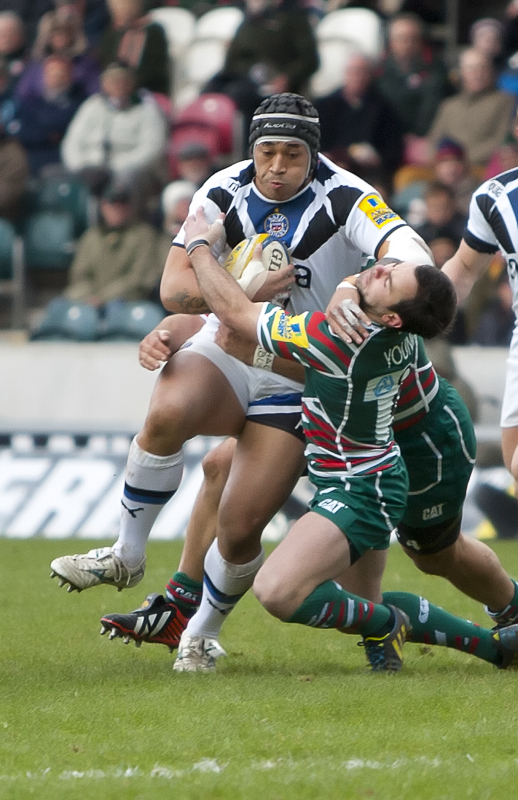
- Full name: Anthony Perenise
- Born: 18 October 1982 (age 44) Porirua, New Zealand
- Height: 1.82 m (6 ft 0 in)
- Weight: 118 kg (18 st 8 lb; 260 lb)
- School: Bishop Viard College

Rugby union career
- Position: Tighthead Prop
- Current team: Bath Rugby
Senior career
Years	Team	Apps	(Points)
2006-2009	Wellington	37	(10)
2007, 2010-2011	Hurricanes	17	(5)
2009	Highlanders	6	(0)
2010-2011	Hawke's Bay	13	(0)
2011-2014	Bath	84	(50)
2014-2017	Bristol	52	(5)
2018-2019	Bath	32	(5)
2019-	Rouen	0	(0)
- Correct as of 12 August 2015
International career
Years	Team	Apps	(Points)
2008-	Samoa	30	(20)
- Correct as of 19 November 2016

Anthony Perenise (born 18 October 1982 in Porirua, Wellington Region, New Zealand) is a rugby union player who plays at prop for Rouen in the French Pro D2 and internationally for Samoa.

Perenise previously played for the Hawke's Bay Magpies and the Hurricanes and Highlanders in New Zealand.

Perenise joined Bristol in 2013 on a three-year contract from Bath. After Bristol's relegation, Perenise rejoined Bath ahead of the 2017/18 season.

On 23 July 2019, Perenise left Bath to sign for French club named Rouen in the Pro D2 from the 2019–20 season.
