= Danie Rossouw =

South African rugby union player

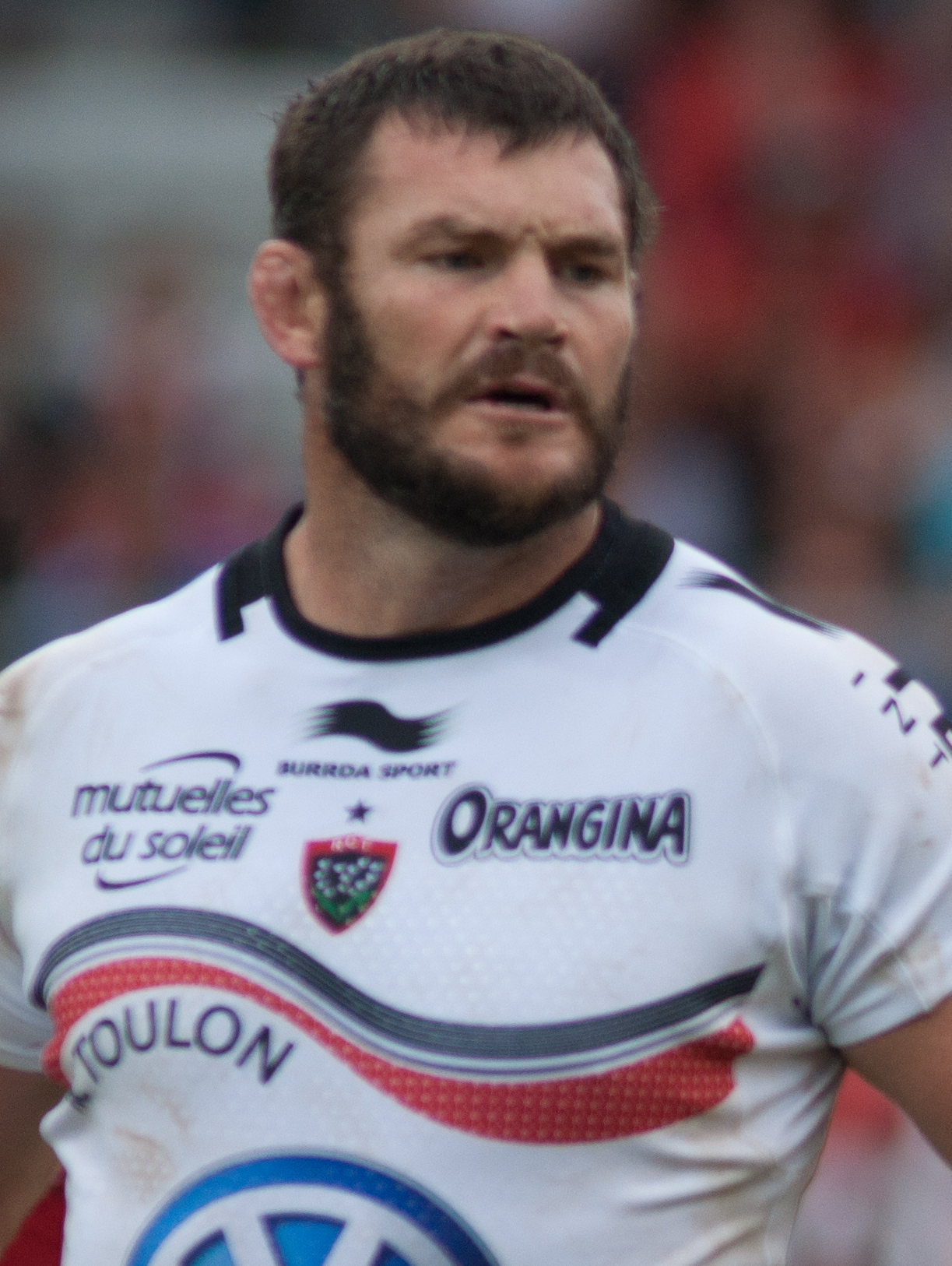
- Full name: Daniel Jacobus Rossouw
- Born: Sabie, South Africa
- Height: 1.98 m (6 ft 6 in)
- Weight: 119 kg (18 st 10 lb; 262 lb)
- School: Rob Ferreira High

Rugby union career
- Position(s): Lock, Flanker, Number Eight
- Current team: Retired
Senior career
Years	Team	Apps	(Points)
1999–2011	Blue Bulls	95	(115)
2002–2011	Bulls	116	(45)
2011–2013	Suntory Sungoliath	13	(15)
2013–2014	Toulon	26	(20)
- Correct as of 17:46, 26 Feb 2016 (UTC)
International career
Years	Team	Apps	(Points)
2003–2011	South Africa	63	(50)
- Correct as of 17:46, 26 Feb 2016 (UTC)

Daniel Jacobus Rossouw is a South African former professional rugby union footballer who played as a second row forward or back row forward. He played for the Bulls in the Super Rugby competition. Rossouw made his provincial debut during 1999 for the Blue Bulls in a match against the North Western Province in the Currie Cup competition. In 2001 he made his Super 12 (now Super Rugby) debut for the Bulls against the Cats.

Rossouw made his first international appearance in the Springboks' opening pool game against Uruguay at the 2003 Rugby World Cup in Australia. He scored a try in the game as well. He did not play in the subsequent match against England, but returned for the game against Georgia, scoring two tries. He played in all the remaining matches until South Africa were knocked out by All Blacks in the quarterfinals.

Rossouw was picked as first-choice Number 8 for the Springboks in their successful world cup campaign of 2007. This was a result of Pierre Spies' unfortunate illness, however Rossouw would no doubt have featured in the squad regardless. His performances included a try in the semifinal against Argentina. He received what looked like a campaign ending injury in the pool clash with Tonga as he was carried off the field with a neck injury. However he recovered and played an important part in the rest of the Springboks march to victory, including a try-saving tackle on Mark Cueto in the final.

Rossouw has won 3 Currie Cup titles, 3 Super Rugby titles, a Japanese title and cup, a Heineken Cup, a Top 14 French Title, a Tri-Nations title, a World Cup and a series victory over the British and Irish Lions.

== Honours ==
Blue Bulls

- Currie Cup: 2004, 2009

Bulls

- Super Rugby: 2007, 2009, 2010

South Africa

- World Cup: 2007
- Tri-Nations: 2009
- British & Irish Lions: 2009

Suntory Sungoliath

- Japan Top League: 2011-2012, 2012–2013
- All Japan Championship 2012

Toulon

- Heineken Cup European Champions: 2013, 2014
- Top 14 French League : 2014
