= Netani Talei =

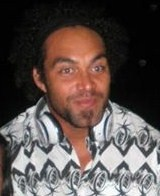
- Born: Netani Edward Talei; 19 March 1983 (age 43) Suva, Fiji
- Height: 1.88 m (6 ft 2 in)
- Weight: 112 kg (17 st 9 lb)
- School: Marist Brothers High School
- University: Wesley College

Rugby union career
- Position(s): Number eight, Flanker
Senior career
| Years | Team | Apps | (Points) |
| 2003 | Raiwaqa | | |
| 2004–2005 | Suva | | |
| 2006 | Nadroga | | |
| 2006–2007 | Doncaster Knights | 15 | (30) |
| 2007–2010 | Worcester Warriors | 55 | (25) |
| 2010–2013 | Edinburgh Rugby | 53 | (40) |
| 2013–2014 | Newport Gwent Dragons | 20 | (0) |
| 2014– | Harlequins | 8 | (0) |
- Correct as of 24 August 2015
International career
| Years | Team | Apps | (Points) |
| 2006– | Fiji | 33 | (20) |
- Correct as of 6 October 2015

Netani Edward Talei (born 19 March 1983 in Suva, Fiji) is a Fijian rugby union player. He plays as a number eight or flanker.

== Career ==
He represented the Fiji U21s in 2004 after earlier studying at Marist Brothers High School and two years at Wesley College (NZ). After his performance with the Stallions in 2006 in which they lifted the Colonial Cup, he joined provincial stalwarts Nadroga. Talei then got the nod for the run-on team in 2006 to help Fiji defeat Samoa 23–20 in Suva. In 2007 he was part of the 30-man Fiji squad that reached the quarter-finals of the Rugby World Cup in France. He played in three pool games before picking up and injury that ruled him out for the rest of the tournament.

Worcester Warriors snapped up Fiji international Talei during the summer, from Doncaster. The giant back row, who has won fifteen caps for his country, signed a one-year deal at Sixways, with an option for an extension.

In March 2008, Worcester opted to extend Talei's contract and he signed a new two-year deal which will keep him at Sixways until 2010.

In May 2010, Edinburgh announced that they had signed Talei on a three-year contract.

Talei moved to Newport Gwent Dragons in the summer of 2013 for the 2013–14 season. He was released by the Dragons in October 2014.
