= Lloyd Burns =

Wales international rugby union player

- Born: Lloyd Burns; 9 December 1984 (age 41) Panteg, Wales
- Height: 1.83 m (6 ft 0 in)
- Weight: 107 kg (16 st 12 lb)
- Notable relative(s): Robbie Burns, Calum Burns, Davey "Boy" Smith, Byron Burns

Rugby union career
- Position: Hooker
Senior career
Years	Team	Apps	(Points)
2008–2012	Dragons	38	(0)
- Correct as of 19:58, 20 November 2011 (UTC)
International career
Years	Team	Apps	(Points)
2011-2012	Wales	7	(5)
- Correct as of 12:16, 16 November 2011 (UTC)

Lloyd Burns (born 9 December 1984, Panteg) is a former Wales international rugby union player. Burns played in the hooker position and played his club rugby for Newport Gwent Dragons having made his debut in the 2008–09 season. He previously played for Pontypool RFC and Cross Keys RFC. Burns also represented Wales at under 16 level.

In May 2011 Burns was selected for Wales' 26-man squad to play the Barbarians on 4 June. He made his full international debut for Wales on 4 June 2011 as a second-half replacement for Huw Bennett. At the time Burns was dual registered with Newport Gwent Dragons regional team and Cross Keys, making him the first Cross Keys player to be capped since Rex 'Tarzan' Richards in 1956.

In August 2011 he was named in the Wales squad for the 2011 Rugby World Cup in New Zealand.

In April 2012 he was forced into retirement from all forms of rugby due to a neck injury and a damaged aorta.
