= Heinz Koll =

Namibia international rugby union player

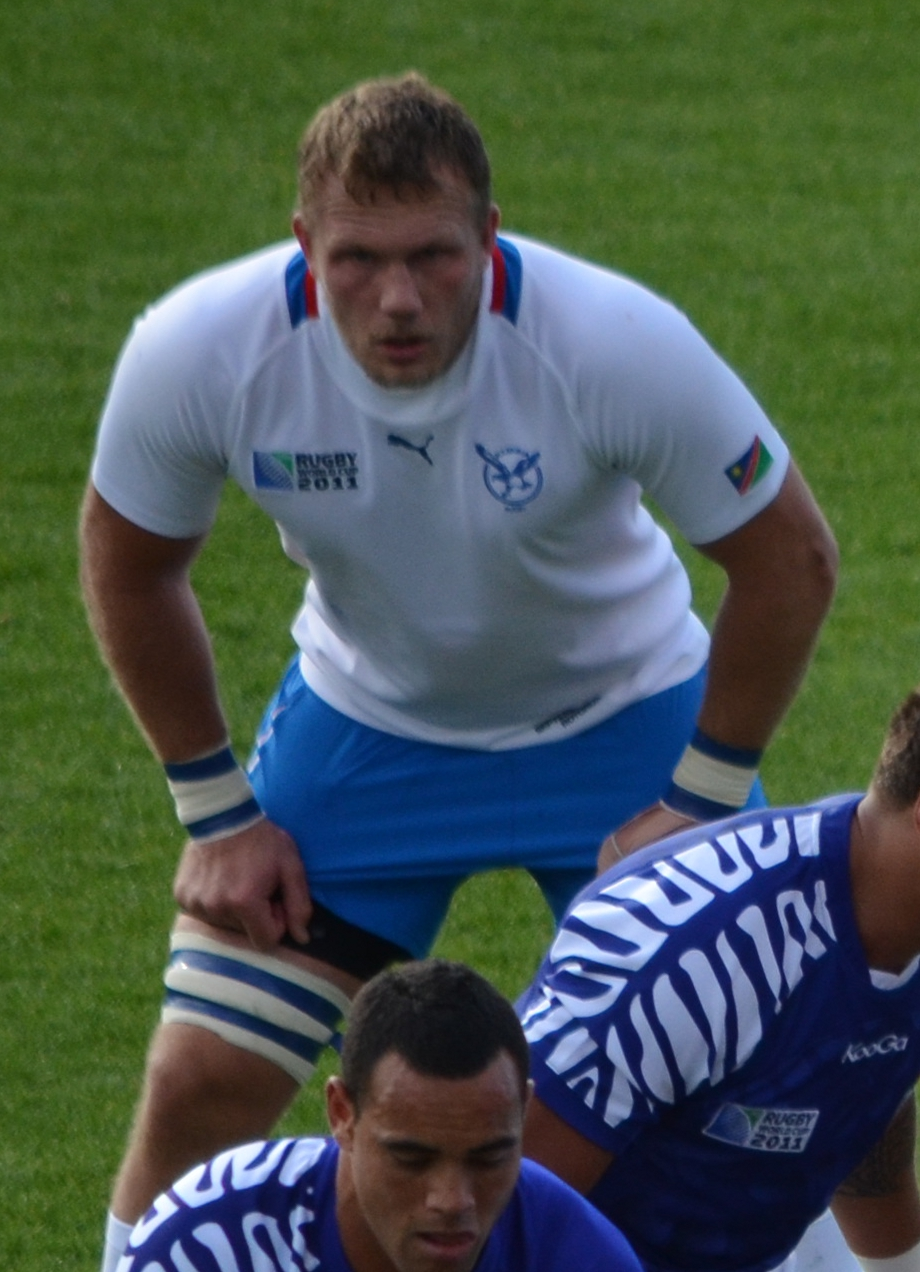
- Height: 6 ft 5 in (1.96 m)
- Weight: 249 lb (113 kg; 17.8 st)

Rugby union career
- Position: Lock
Amateur team(s)
Years	Team	Apps	(Points)
2009–2011	Namibia Welwitchias		
Senior career
Years	Team	Apps	(Points)
2012	London Wasps	2	(0)
International career
Years	Team	Apps	(Points)
2009–present	Namibia	16	(15)

Heinz Koll is a rugby union player. He plays for Namibia. He played for London Wasps during the 2011/12 season. He was released from Wasps on 11 May 2012.
