= 2010 end-of-year rugby union internationals =

The 2010 end-of-year rugby union tests, also known as the Autumn internationals in the northern hemisphere, saw Argentina, Australia, New Zealand and South Africa in a competitive tour of the northern hemisphere. Test matches were also arranged with the various Pacific island teams and other non-Tier 1 international sides. This period also marked the conclusion of the 2011 Rugby World Cup qualifying process, as well as the beginning of the European Nations Cup.

The series saw Ireland play their first Test matches at the Aviva Stadium, which replaces Lansdowne Road as the side's long-term home and ends the temporary arrangement with the Gaelic Athletic Association which allowed the team to play home matches at Croke Park. The series also marked the first time that two Southern Hemisphere nations simultaneously attempted Grand Slam tours of all four Home Nations, with both New Zealand and South Africa playing all four countries. The Springboks went 3–1 against the Home Nations, losing to Scotland, and also lost to the Barbarians, but the All Blacks were successful for the fourth time and third since 2005.

New Zealand entered the series on a winning streak of 15 Tests. The current record for "Tier 1" nations is 17, which they hold jointly with South Africa; the absolute record is 18, held by Lithuania. New Zealand's streak ended with a 26-24 loss to Australia in their opening game.

In all, 24 of the top 25 sides in the IRB World Rankings (as of 30 September 2010) played in the end-of-year series.

== Matches ==
29 September 2010
16:30 CHST (UTC-04)

Chile	30–32	Tonga
Try: Schachner 38'; Penalty try 80'; Con: Cruz; Pen: Reyes 10', 33', 44', 48', 57'; Cruz 76'	Report	Try: Hikila 16'; Fakafanua 34'; Mateo 43'; Toloke 62'; Con: Toloke (2) 17', 35'; Apikotoa 63'; Pen: Apikotoa 46'

Estadio San Carlos de Apoquindo, Santiago
Referee: Jaime Vial (Chile)

23 October 2010
15:00 MT (UTC+04)

Russia	20–40	Argentina XV
Try: Ostroushko 37'; Boltenkov 62'; Con: Klyuchnikov 38', 63'; Pen: Klyuchnikov 28', 57'		Try: San Martín 11'; Senatore 23'; Cabello 35'; Chaparro 48'; Báez 75'; Comuzzi 78'; Con: Sánchez 12', 36', 49'; González Iglesias 76', 79'

Slava Stadium, Moscow
Referee: John Lacey (Ireland)

30 October 2010
14:00 JST (UTC+09)

Japan	10–13	Samoa
Try: Holani 7' c Con: Arlidge (1/1); Pen: Arlidge (1/2) 2'	Report	Try: Fotuali'i 69' c Con: Lui (1/1); Pen: Lui (2/2) 45', 54'

Chichibunomiya Rugby Stadium, Tokyo
Attendance: 3,743
Referee: Garratt Williamson (New Zealand)

FB	15	Ayumu Goromaru
RW	14	Kosuke Endo
OC	13	Koji Taira
IC	12	Ryan Nicholas
LW	11	Hirotoki Onozawa
FH	10	James Arlidge
SH	9	Fumiaki Tanaka
N8	8	Koliniasi Holani
OF	7	Toetuʻu Taufa
BF	6	Takashi Kikutani (c)
RL	5	Toshizumi Kitagawa
LL	4	Luke Thompson
TP	3	Kensuke Hatakeyama
HK	2	Shota Horie
LP	1	Naoki Kawamata
Replacements:
HK	16	Hiroki Yuhara
PR	17	Hisateru Hirashima
LK	18	Hitoshi Ono
FL	19	Michael Leitch
SH	20	Koji Wada
FB	21	Bryce Robins
WG	22	Alisi Tupuailei
Coach:
(New Zealand) John Kirwan

FB	15	Lolo Lui (c)
RW	14	Mikaele Pesamino
OC	13	Josh Tatupu
IC	12	Jamie Helleur
LW	11	Sinoti Sinoti
FH	10	Joshua Keil
SH	9	Kahn Fotuali'i
N8	8	Richard Muagututia
OF	7	Afa Aiono
BF	6	Ofisa Treviranus
RL	5	Maselino Paulino
LL	4	Simaika Mikaele
TP	3	Anthony Perenise
HK	2	Andrew Williams
LP	1	Logovi'i Mulipola
Replacements:
PR	16	Viliamu Afatia
PR	17	Simon Lemalu
LK	18	Levi Asifa'amatala
N8	19	Falemiga Selesele
FH	20	Faatalatala Fagasoaia
CE	21	Iafeta Laau
WG	22	Uarotafou Setu
Coach:
Fuimaono Tafua

Touch judges:
Vinny Munro (New Zealand)
Taizo Hirabayashi (Japan)

30 October 2010
16:30 HKT (UTC+08)

Australia	26–24	New Zealand
Try: Cooper 8' m Ashley-Cooper 23' c Mitchell 60' c O'Connor 80+1' c Con: Giteau (1/2); O'Connor (2/2)	Report	Try: Cowan 30' c Jane 33' c Nonu 53' c Con: Carter (3/3); Pen: Carter 40+1'

Hong Kong Stadium, Hong Kong
Attendance: 26,210
Referee: Alain Rolland (Ireland)

FB	15	Kurtley Beale
RW	14	James O'Connor
OC	13	Adam Ashley-Cooper
IC	12	Matt Giteau	(substituted off) 63'
LW	11	Drew Mitchell
FH	10	Quade Cooper
SH	9	Will Genia	(substituted off) 76'
N8	8	Ben McCalman
OF	7	David Pocock
BF	6	Rocky Elsom (c)
RL	5	Nathan Sharpe
LL	4	Mark Chisholm	(substituted off) 72'
TP	3	Ben Alexander
HK	2	Stephen Moore	(substituted off) 62'
LP	1	Benn Robinson	(substituted off) 51'
Replacements:
HK	16	Saia Fainga'a	(substituted on) 62'
PR	17	James Slipper	(substituted on) 51'
LK	18	Dean Mumm	(substituted on) 72'
N8	19	Richard Brown
SH	20	Luke Burgess	(substituted on) 76'
FH	21	Berrick Barnes	(substituted on) 63'
WG	22	Lachlan Turner
Coach:
(New Zealand) Robbie Deans

FB	15	Mils Muliaina
RW	14	Cory Jane	(substituted off) 51'
OC	13	Conrad Smith
IC	12	Ma'a Nonu
LW	11	Joe Rokocoko
FH	10	Daniel Carter	(substituted off) 60'
SH	9	Jimmy Cowan	(substituted off) 72'
N8	8	Kieran Read
OF	7	Richie McCaw (c)
BF	6	Jerome Kaino
RL	5	Tom Donnelly	(substituted off) 66'
LL	4	Brad Thorn
TP	3	Owen Franks	(substituted off) 60'
HK	2	Keven Mealamu
LP	1	Tony Woodcock
Replacements:
HK	16	Hika Elliot
PR	17	John Afoa	(substituted on) 60'
LK	18	Sam Whitelock	(substituted on) 66'
OF	19	Daniel Braid
SH	20	Alby Mathewson	(substituted on) 72'
FH	21	Stephen Donald	(substituted on) 60'
UB	22	Isaia Toeava	(substituted on) 51'
Coach:
(New Zealand) Graham Henry

Touch judges:
George Clancy (Ireland)
Simon McDowell (Ireland)
Television match official:
Matt Goddard (Australia)

30 October 2010
15:00 MT (UTC+04)

Russia	6–32	Argentina XV
Pen: Yanushkin; Kluchnikov	Report	Try: Cubelli; Bouza; Estelles (2); Gosio; Con: Iglesias; Sánchez; Pen: Cubelli

Slava Stadium, Moscow
Referee: James Jones (Wales)

6 November 2010
14:00 JST (UTC+09)

Japan	75–3	Russia
Try: Tupuailei (3) 5' c, 72' m, 80+2' c Leitch 13' c Taira (2) 28' c, 39' c Kikutani 34' c Imamura 47' c Robins (2) 65' c, 78' c Endo 68' c Con: Tanabe (10/11)	Report	Pen: Yanushkin 38'

Chichibunomiya Rugby Stadium, Tokyo
Attendance: 6,274
Referee: Vinny Munro (New Zealand)

FB	15	Atsushi Tanabe
RW	14	Kosuke Endo
OC	13	Koji Taira
IC	12	Ryan Nicholas
LW	11	Alisi Tupuailei
FH	10	Bryce Robins
SH	9	Koji Wada
N8	8	Koliniasi Holani
OF	7	Michael Leitch
BF	6	Takashi Kikutani (c)
RL	5	Toshizumi Kitagawa
LL	4	Hitoshi Ono
TP	3	Nozomu Fujita
HK	2	Hiroki Yuhara
LP	1	Hisateru Hirashima
Replacements:
HK	16	Shota Horie
PR	17	Naoki Kawamata
LK	18	Luke Thompson
N8	19	Itaru Taniguchi
SH	20	Fumiaki Tanaka
FH	21	James Arlidge
CE	22	Yuta Imamura
Coach:
(New Zealand) John Kirwan

FB	15	Igor Kluchnikov
RW	14	Vladimir Ostroushko
OC	13	Andrey Kuzin
IC	12	Sergey Trishin
LW	11	Vasily Artemiev
FH	10	Alexey Korobeynikov
SH	9	Alexander Yanushkin
N8	8	Nikita Medkov
BF	7	Kirill Kushnarev
OF	6	Victor Gresev
RL	5	Artem Fatakhov
LL	4	Alexander Voytov
TP	3	Evgeny Pronenko
HK	2	Vladislav Korshunov (c)
LP	1	Sergey Popov
Replacements:
HK	16	Evgeny Matveev
PR	17	Alexander Khrokin
PR	18	Ivan Prishchepenko
LK	19	Alexey Panasenko
FH	20	Alexander Shakirov
CE	21	Alexey Makovetskiy
WG	22	Oleg Kobzev
Coach:
(Russia) Nikolay Nerush

Touch judges:
Garratt Williamson (New Zealand)
Taizo Hirabayashi (Japan)

6 November 2010
15:30 CET/GMT+01 (UTC+01)

Belgium	12–43	Canada
	Report

King Baudouin Stadium, Brussels
Attendance: 5,000
Referee: Marius Mitrea (Italy)

6 November 2010
14:30 BT/GMT+0 (UTC+0)

England	16–26	New Zealand
Try: Hartley 54' c Con: Flood (1/1); Pen: Flood 24', 44', 65'	Report	Try: Gear 16' c Read 21' c Con: Carter (2/2); Pen: Carter (4) 31', 47', 56', 69'

Twickenham Stadium, London
Attendance: 80,350
Referee: Romain Poite (France)

FB	15	Ben Foden
RW	14	Chris Ashton
OC	13	Mike Tindall
IC	12	Shontayne Hape
LW	11	Mark Cueto	(substituted off) 67'
FH	10	Toby Flood
SH	9	Ben Youngs	(substituted off) 71'
N8	8	Nick Easter
OF	7	Lewis Moody (c)	(substituted off) 66'
BF	6	Tom Croft
RL	5	Tom Palmer	(substituted off) 63'
LL	4	Courtney Lawes
TP	3	Dan Cole
HK	2	Steve Thompson	(substituted off) 50'
LP	1	Andrew Sheridan	(substituted off) 57'
Replacements:
HK	16	Dylan Hartley	(substituted on) 50'
PR	17	David Wilson	(substituted on) 57'
LK	18	Dave Attwood	(substituted on) 63'
FL	19	Hendre Fourie	(substituted on) 66'
SH	20	Danny Care	(substituted on) 71'
FH	21	Charlie Hodgson
FB	22	Delon Armitage	(substituted on) 67'
Coach:
(England) Martin Johnson

FB	15	Mils Muliaina
RW	14	Joe Rokocoko		(substituted off) 57'
OC	13	Sonny Bill Williams
IC	12	Ma'a Nonu
LW	11	Hosea Gear
FH	10	Dan Carter
SH	9	Alby Mathewson		(substituted off) 51'
N8	8	Kieran Read
OF	7	Richie McCaw (c)
BF	6	Jerome Kaino	(yellow card) 71' to 80'
RL	5	Sam Whitelock		(substituted off) 68'
LL	4	Brad Thorn
TP	3	Owen Franks		(substituted off) 75'
HK	2	Keven Mealamu
LP	1	Tony Woodcock
Replacements:
HK	16	Hika Elliot
PR	17	John Afoa		(substituted on) 75'
LK	18	Anthony Boric		(substituted on) 68'
FL	19	Liam Messam
SH	20	Andy Ellis		(substituted on) 51'
FH	21	Stephen Donald
CE	22	Isaia Toeava		(substituted on) 57'
Coach:
(New Zealand) Graham Henry

Touch judges:
Stuart Dickinson (Australia)
David Changleng (Scotland)
Television match official:
Giulio De Santis (Italy)

- Following the match, Keven Mealamu was cited for headbutting Lewis Moody, an offence that did not draw a card from match referee Romain Poite. Mealamu was originally banned for four weeks, but the ban was reduced on appeal to two weeks.

6 November 2010
14:30 BT/GMT+0 (UTC+0)

Wales	16–25	Australia
Try: Rees 70' c Con: Biggar (1/1); Pen: S. Jones (3/5) 1', 31', 52'	Report	Try: Pocock 6' c Beale 47' c Alexander 60' m Con: O'Connor (2/3); Pen: O'Connor (2/3) 64', 73'

Millennium Stadium, Cardiff
Attendance: 53,127
Referee: Wayne Barnes (England)

FB	15	James Hook
RW	14	Will Harries
OC	13	Tom Shanklin	(yellow card) 63' to 73'	(substituted off) 76'
IC	12	Andrew Bishop
LW	11	Shane Williams
FH	10	Stephen Jones		(substituted off) 65'
SH	9	Mike Phillips		(substituted off) 65'
N8	8	Jonathan Thomas
OF	7	Sam Warburton		(substituted off) 65'
BF	6	Dan Lydiate
RL	5	Alun Wyn Jones		(substituted off) 74'
LL	4	Bradley Davies
TP	3	Adam Jones
HK	2	Matthew Rees (c)		(substituted off) 75'
LP	1	Gethin Jenkins		(substituted off) 71'
Replacements:
HK	16	Huw Bennett		(substituted on) 75'
PR	17	Paul James		(substituted on) 71'
LK	18	Deiniol Jones		(substituted on) 74'
FL	19	Martyn Williams		(substituted on) 65'
SH	20	Richie Rees		(substituted on) 65'
FH	21	Dan Biggar		(substituted on) 65'
WG	22	Chris Czekaj		(substituted on) 76'
Coach:
(New Zealand) Warren Gatland

FB	15	Kurtley Beale
RW	14	James O'Connor
OC	13	Adam Ashley-Cooper
IC	12	Matt Giteau	(substituted off) 67'
LW	11	Drew Mitchell
FH	10	Quade Cooper
SH	9	Will Genia	(substituted off) 74'
N8	8	Ben McCalman
OF	7	David Pocock
BF	6	Rocky Elsom (c)
RL	5	Nathan Sharpe
LL	4	Mark Chisholm	(substituted off) 75'
TP	3	Ben Alexander	(substituted off) 62'
HK	16^{[a]}	Saia Fainga'a	(substituted off) 54'
LP	1	Benn Robinson
Replacements:
HK	26^{[a]}	Huia Edmonds	(substituted on) 54'
PR	17	James Slipper	(substituted on) 62'
LK	18	Dean Mumm	(substituted on) 75'
N8	19	Richard Brown
SH	20	Luke Burgess	(substituted on) 74'
FH	21	Berrick Barnes	(substituted on) 67'
WG	22	Lachlan Turner
Coach:
(New Zealand) Robbie Deans

Touch judges:
Chris Pollock (New Zealand)
Peter Allan (Scotland)
Television match official:
Graham Hughes (England)

a. Stephen Moore suffered a back spasm minutes before kick-off and was replaced in the starting line-up by Saia Fainga'a, so Fainga'a started the match wearing number 16. Huia Edmonds took Fainga'a's place on the bench and wore number 26.

6 November 2010
17:30 IST/GMT+0 (UTC+0)

Ireland	21–23	South Africa
Try: Bowe 68' c Kearney 74' m Con: O'Gara (1/2); Pen: Sexton (3/4) 26', 40', 55'	Report	Try: Smith 16' c Aplon 64' c Con: M. Steyn (1/1); Lambie (1/1); Pen: M. Steyn (3/4) 5', 37', 52'

Aviva Stadium, Dublin
Attendance: 35,515
Referee: Nigel Owens (Wales)

FB	15	Rob Kearney	(substituted off) 75'
RW	14	Tommy Bowe
OC	13	Brian O'Driscoll (c)
IC	12	Gordon D'Arcy
LW	11	Luke Fitzgerald
FH	10	Johnny Sexton	(substituted off) 67'
SH	9	Eoin Reddan	(substituted off) 66'
N8	8	Jamie Heaslip
OF	7	David Wallace
BF	6	Stephen Ferris
RL	5	Mick O'Driscoll	(substituted off) 63'
LL	4	Donncha O'Callaghan
TP	3	Tony Buckley	(substituted off) 50'
HK	2	Rory Best
LP	1	Cian Healy
Replacements:
HK	16	Seán Cronin
PR	17	Tom Court	(substituted on) 50'
LK	18	Donnacha Ryan	(substituted on) 63'
FL	19	Denis Leamy
SH	20	Peter Stringer	(substituted on) 66'
FH	21	Ronan O'Gara	(substituted on) 67'
CE	22	Keith Earls	(substituted on) 75'
Coach:
(Ireland) Declan Kidney

FB	15	Gio Aplon
RW	14	Bjorn Basson
OC	13	Zane Kirchner
IC	12	Jean de Villiers		(substituted off) 68'
LW	11	Bryan Habana	(yellow card) 75' to 80'
FH	10	Morné Steyn		(substituted off) 58'
SH	9	Ruan Pienaar
N8	8	Pierre Spies
BF	7	Juan Smith
OF	6	Deon Stegmann		(substituted off) 66'
RL	5	Victor Matfield (c)
LL	4	Bakkies Botha		(substituted off) 70'
TP	3	Jannie du Plessis		(substituted off) 70'
HK	2	Bismarck du Plessis
LP	1	Tendai Mtawarira
Replacements:
HK	16	Chiliboy Ralepelle
PR	17	CJ van der Linde		(substituted on) 70'
LK	18	Flip van der Merwe		(substituted on) 70'
FL	19	Keegan Daniel		(substituted on) 66'
SH	20	Francois Hougaard
UB	21	Adrian Jacobs		(substituted on) 68'
UB	22	Patrick Lambie		(substituted on) 58'
Coach:
(South Africa) Peter de Villiers

Touch judges:
Bryce Lawrence (New Zealand)
Keith Brown (New Zealand)
Television match official:
Hugh Watkins (Wales)

- Victor Matfield drew level with Percy Montgomery and John Smit as the most-capped Springboks, with 102.
- Morné Steyn's streak of consecutive successful kicks at goal in Tests ended at 41, which is the longest such streak since records on kickers' success were first kept in the late 1980s.

13 November 2010
15:00 CET/GMT+01 (UTC+01)

Italy	16–22	Argentina
Try: Penalty try 78'; Con: Bergamasco 78'; Pen: Bergamasco 9', 29', 68'	Report	Try: Rodríguez 49'; Con: Contepomi 50'; Pen: Contepomi (5) 17', 37', 70', 72', 80'

Stadio Marc'Antonio Bentegodi, Verona
Attendance: 29,500
Referee: Chris Pollock (New Zealand)

FB	15	Luke McLean
RW	14	Tommaso Benvenuti
OC	13	Gonzalo Canale
IC	12	Andrea Masi	(substituted off) 68'
LW	11	Mirco Bergamasco
FH	10	Craig Gower	(substituted off) 73'
SH	9	Tito Tebaldi	(substituted off) 62'
N8	8	Sergio Parisse (c)
OF	7	Robert Barbieri
BF	6	Alessandro Zanni	(substituted off) 62'
RL	5	Quintin Geldenhuys
LL	4	Carlo Del Fava	(substituted off) 73'
TP	3	Martin Castrogiovanni
HK	2	Leonardo Ghiraldini	(substituted off) 58'
LP	1	Salvatore Perugini	(substituted off) 62'
Replacements:
HK	16	Fabio Ongaro	(substituted on) 58'
PR	17	Andrea Lo Cicero	(substituted on) 62'
LK	18	Santiago Dellapè	(substituted on) 73'
FL	19	Paul Derbyshire	(substituted on) 62'
SH	20	Pablo Canavosio	(substituted on) 62'
FH	21	Luciano Orquera	(substituted on) 73'
CE	22	Alberto Sgarbi	(substituted on) 68'
Coach:
(South Africa) Nick Mallett

FB	15	Martín Rodríguez
RW	14	Gonzalo Camacho
OC	13	Gonzalo Tiesi
IC	12	Santiago Fernández
LW	11	Lucas González Amorosino
FH	10	Felipe Contepomi (c)
SH	9	Nicolas Vergallo
N8	8	Juan Martín Fernández Lobbe		(substituted off) 35'
OF	7	Miguel de Achaval
BF	6	Genaro Fessia		(substituted off) 78'
RL	5	Mariano Galarza	(yellow card) 76' to 80+1'
LL	4	Manuel Carizza		(substituted off) 48'
TP	3	Martín Scelzo		(substituted off) 62'
HK	2	Mario Ledesma		(substituted off) 62'
LP	1	Rodrigo Roncero
Replacements:
HK	16	Agustín Creevy		(substituted on) 62'
PR	17	Marcos Ayerza		(substituted on) 78'
PR	18	Juan Figallo		(substituted on) 62'
LK	19	Esteban Lozada		(substituted on) 48'
FL	20	Alvaro Galindo		(substituted on) 35'
SH	21	Alfredo Lalanne
WG	22	Horacio Agulla
Coach:
Santiago Phelan

Touch judges:
Romain Poite (France)
Pascal Gaüzère (France)
Television match official:
Daniel Gillet (France)

13 November 2010
14:30 BT/GMT+0 (UTC+0)

England	35–18	Australia
Try: Ashton 25' c, 47' c Con: Flood (2/2); Pen: Flood (7) 11', 34', 38', 42', 57', 69', 77'	Report	Try: Beale (2) 54' c, 65' m Con: O'Connor (1/2); Pen: O'Connor (2) 31', 39'

Twickenham Stadium, London
Attendance: 80,002
Referee: Craig Joubert (South Africa)

FB	15	Ben Foden
RW	14	Chris Ashton
OC	13	Mike Tindall	(substituted off) 63'
IC	12	Shontayne Hape
LW	11	Mark Cueto
FH	10	Toby Flood	(substituted off) 78'
SH	9	Ben Youngs	(substituted off) 58'
N8	8	Nick Easter	(substituted off) 78'
OF	7	Lewis Moody (c)
BF	6	Tom Croft
RL	5	Tom Palmer	(substituted off) 71'
LL	4	Courtney Lawes
TP	3	Dan Cole
HK	2	Dylan Hartley	(substituted off) 70'
LP	1	Andrew Sheridan	(substituted off) 70'
Replacements:
HK	16	Steve Thompson	(substituted on) 70'
PR	17	David Wilson	(substituted on) 70'
LK	18	Simon Shaw	(substituted on) 71'
FL	19	Hendre Fourie	(substituted on) 78'
SH	20	Danny Care	(substituted on) 58'
FH	21	Charlie Hodgson	(substituted on) 78'
FB	22	Delon Armitage	(substituted on) 63'
Coach:
(England) Martin Johnson

FB	15	Kurtley Beale
RW	14	James O'Connor
OC	13	Adam Ashley-Cooper
IC	12	Matt Giteau	(yellow card) 37' to 47' (substituted off) 59'
LW	11	Drew Mitchell
FH	10	Quade Cooper
SH	9	Will Genia	(substituted off) 48'
N8	8	Ben McCalman	(substituted off) 58'
OF	7	David Pocock
BF	6	Rocky Elsom (c)
RL	5	Nathan Sharpe
LL	4	Mark Chisholm	(substituted off) 58'
TP	3	Ben Alexander
HK	2	Stephen Moore
LP	1	Benn Robinson	(substituted off) 56'
Replacements:
HK	16	Saia Fainga'a
PR	17	James Slipper	(substituted on) 56'
LK	18	Dean Mumm	(substituted on) 58'
N8	19	Richard Brown	(substituted on) 58'
SH	20	Luke Burgess	(substituted on) 48'
CE	21	Berrick Barnes	(substituted on) 63'
WG	22	Lachlan Turner
Coach:
(New Zealand) Robbie Deans

Touch judges:
Christophe Berdos (France)
Simon McDowell (Ireland)
Television match official:
Jim Yuille (Scotland)

13 November 2010
14:30 IST/GMT+0 (UTC+0)

Ireland	20–10	Samoa
Try: Heaslip 18' c O'Gara 65' c Con: O'Gara (2/2) 19', 66'; Pen: O'Gara (2) 1', 30'	Report	Try: Tuilagi 21' c Con: P. Williams (1/1) 22'; Pen: P. Williams 54'

Aviva Stadium, Dublin
Attendance: 30,985
Referee: Keith Brown (New Zealand)

FB	15	Luke Fitzgerald
RW	14	Tommy Bowe
OC	13	Brian O'Driscoll (c)
IC	12	Paddy Wallace
LW	11	Andrew Trimble
FH	10	Ronan O'Gara
SH	9	Peter Stringer	(substituted off) 77'
N8	8	Jamie Heaslip	(substituted off) 61'
OF	7	Seán O'Brien
BF	6	Denis Leamy
RL	5	Devin Toner	(substituted off) 68'
LL	4	Donncha O'Callaghan
TP	3	John Hayes	(substituted off) 64'
HK	2	Seán Cronin	(substituted off) 61'
LP	1	Tom Court
Replacements:
HK	16	Rory Best	(substituted on) 61'
PR	17	Cian Healy	(substituted on) 64'
LK	18	Donnacha Ryan	(substituted on) 68'
FL	19	Stephen Ferris	(substituted on) 61'
SH	20	Isaac Boss	(substituted on) 77'
FH	21	Johnny Sexton
CE	22	Keith Earls
Coach:
(Ireland) Declan Kidney

FB	15	Paul Williams
RW	14	David Lemi
OC	13	George Pisi	(substituted off) 78'
IC	12	Seilala Mapusua
LW	11	Alesana Tuilagi
FH	10	Tasesa Lavea	(substituted off) 69'
SH	9	Kahn Fotuali'i
N8	8	George Stowers
OF	7	Manaia Salave'a
BF	6	Ofisa Treviranus	(substituted off) 71'
RL	5	Kane Thompson
LL	4	Filipo Levi	(substituted off) 71'
TP	3	Anthony Perenise
HK	2	Mahonri Schwalger (c)
LP	1	Sakaria Taulafo	(substituted off) 77'
Replacements:
HK	16	Steve Fualau
PR	17	Simon Lemalu	(substituted on) 77'
LK	18	Joe Tekori	(substituted on) 71'
FL	19	Afa Aiono	(substituted on) 71'
SH	20	Junior Poluleuligaga	(substituted on) 69'
CE	21	Gavin Williams	(substituted on) 78'
FB	22	Jamie Helleur
Coach:
(Samoa) Fuimaono Tafua

Touch judges:
Jérôme Garces (France)
Neil Paterson (Scotland)
Television match official:
Geoff Warren (England)

13 November 2010
14:30 BT/GMT+0 (UTC+0)

Wales	25–29	South Africa
Try: North (2) 5' c, 56' m Hook 17' c Con: S. Jones (2/3); Pen: S. Jones (2/3) 27', 42'	Report	Try: Alberts 50' c Matfield 53' c Con: M. Steyn (2/2); Pen: M. Steyn (5/6) 1', 19', 40', 46', 64'

Millennium Stadium, Cardiff
Attendance: 54,027
Referee: Steve Walsh (Australia)

FB	15	Lee Byrne
RW	14	George North
OC	13	Tom Shanklin
IC	12	James Hook
LW	11	Shane Williams	(substituted off) 40'
FH	10	Stephen Jones
SH	9	Mike Phillips
N8	8	Jonathan Thomas
OF	7	Martyn Williams
BF	6	Andy Powell	(substituted off) 59'
RL	5	Alun Wyn Jones	(substituted off) 73'
LL	4	Bradley Davies
TP	3	Adam Jones
HK	2	Matthew Rees (c)	(substituted off) 71'
LP	1	Paul James	(substituted off) 71'
Replacements:
HK	16	Huw Bennett	(substituted on) 71'
PR	17	John Yapp	(substituted on) 71'
LK	18	Deiniol Jones	(substituted on) 73'
FL	19	Ryan Jones	(substituted on) 59'
SH	20	Richie Rees
CE	21	Andrew Bishop
WG	22	Chris Czekaj	(substituted on) 40'
Coach:
(New Zealand) Warren Gatland

FB	15	Gio Aplon
RW	14	Bjorn Basson
OC	13	François Steyn
IC	12	Jean de Villiers
LW	11	Bryan Habana	(substituted off) 73'
FH	10	Morné Steyn	(substituted off) 64'
SH	9	Ruan Pienaar	(substituted off) 59'
N8	8	Pierre Spies
BF	7	Juan Smith
OF	6	Deon Stegmann	(substituted off) 46'
RL	5	Victor Matfield (c)
LL	4	Bakkies Botha
TP	3	Jannie du Plessis	(substituted off) 73'
HK	2	Bismarck du Plessis	(substituted off) 73'
LP	1	Tendai Mtawarira
Replacements:
HK	16	Chiliboy Ralepelle	(substituted on) 73'
PR	17	CJ van der Linde	(substituted on) 73'
LK	18	Flip van der Merwe
FL	19	Willem Alberts	(substituted on) 46'
SH	20	Francois Hougaard	(substituted on) 59'
FB	21	Zane Kirchner	(substituted on) 73'
FH	22	Patrick Lambie	(substituted on) 64'
Coach:
(South Africa) Peter de Villiers

Touch judges:
Bryce Lawrence (New Zealand)
Stuart Terheege (England)
Television match official:
Graham Hughes (England)

- Victor Matfield earned his 103rd cap, becoming the most-capped Springbok.

13 November 2010
15:00 WET/GMT+0 (UTC+0)

Portugal	17–22	United States
Try: V. Uva 73' m Pen: Gardener (4) 5', 18', 42', 57'	Report	Try: Ngwenya 28'; Suniula 56'; Emerick 60'; Con: Malifa (2/3); Pen: Malifa (1) 34'

Lisbon University Stadium, Lisbon
Referee: JP Doyle (England)

FB	15	Pedro Leal
RW	14	José Lima	(substituted off) 54'
OC	13	Frederico Oliveira	(substituted off) 65'
IC	12	Pedro Silva
LW	11	António Aguilar
FH	10	Joseph Gardener	(substituted off) 70'
SH	9	José Pinto
N8	8	Tiago Girão	(substituted off) 55'
OF	7	Julien Bardy
BF	6	Vasco Uva
RL	5	Juan Severino Somoza	(substituted off) 55'
LL	4	Gonçalo Uva
TP	3	Anthony Alves	(substituted off) 65'
HK	2	João Correia (c)	(substituted off) 55'
LP	1	Ruben Spachuck
Replacements:
HK	16	Lionel Campergue	(substituted on) 55'
PR	17	Ivo Morais	(substituted on) 65'
LK	18	Rui D'Orey	(substituted on) 55'
FL	19	Laurent Balangué	(substituted on) 55'
FH	20	Pedro Cabral	(substituted on) 70'
CE	21	Francisco Mira	(substituted on) 65'
WG	22	Gonçalo Foro	(substituted on) 54'
Coach:
(New Zealand) Errol Brain

FB	15	Chris Wyles
RW	14	Takudzwa Ngwenya
OC	13	Seta Tuilevuka	(substituted off) 50'
IC	12	Andrew Suniula
LW	11	Kevin Swiryn
FH	10	Nese Malifa
SH	9	Tim Usasz	(substituted off) 72'
N8	8	Nic Johnson	(substituted off) 60'
OF	7	Todd Clever (c)
BF	6	Louis Stanfill
RL	5	John van der Giessen	(substituted off) 28'
LL	4	Scott Lavalla
TP	3	Shawn Pittman
HK	2	Phil Thiel	(substituted off) 72'
LP	1	Matekitonga Moeakiola	(substituted off) 60'
Replacements:
HK	16	Chris Biller	(substituted on) 72'
PR	17	Mike MacDonald	(substituted on) 60'
N8	18	JJ Gagiano	(substituted on) 60'
FL	19	Inaki Basauri	(substituted on) 28'
SH	20	Mike Petri	(substituted on) 72'
FH	21	Tai Enosa
CE	22	Paul Emerick	(substituted on) 50'
Coach:
(Ireland) Eddie O'Sullivan

13 November 2010
16:00 CET/GMT+01 (UTC+01)

Spain	22–60	Canada
Try: Pradalie 48' m Belzunce 79' m Pen: Fernández 8', 26', 34', 40'	Report	Try: Riordan 3' c Paris (2) 9' c, 77' m O'Toole 17' c Carpenter 22' c Van der Merwe 46' c Marshall 62' c Stephen 68' c Con: Pritchard (7/8) 3', 9', 17', 22', 46', 62', 68'; Pen: Pritchard (2) 36', 73'

Estadio Nacional Complutense, Madrid
Attendance: 8,000
Referee: Frank Himmer (Germany)

FB	15	Ignacio Gutiérrez-Muller
RW	14	Pierre Belzunce
OC	13	Martín Heredia
IC	12	Bruno Angulo	(substituted off) 69'
LW	11	Baptiste Sanchez	(substituted off) 24'
FH	10	Mathieu Gratton
SH	9	Santiago Fernández
N8	8	Federico Negrillo
OF	7	Martín Aceña (c)	(substituted off) 56'
BF	6	Gautier Gibouin
RL	5	Damien Elgoyhen	(substituted off) 55'
LL	4	Jesús Recuerda
TP	3	Jesús Moreno	(substituted off) 64'
HK	2	Mathieu Cidré	(substituted off) 78'
LP	1	Anthony Pradalie	(substituted off) 73'
Replacements:
HK	16	Sylvain González	(substituted on) 78'
PR	17	Rodrigo Martínez	(substituted on) 73'
PR	18	Mattin Auzqui	(substituted on) 64'
LK	19	David Barrera	(substituted on) 55'
N8	20	Matthew Cook	(substituted on) 56'
CE	21	Sébastien Rouet	(substituted on) 69'
WG	22	Diego Alvarez	(substituted on) 24'
Coach:
(France) Régis Sonnes

FB	15	James Pritchard
RW	14	Taylor Paris
OC	13	D. T. H. van der Merwe		(substituted off) 71'
IC	12	Phil Mackenzie
LW	11	Justin Mensah-Coker
FH	10	Ciaran Hearn
SH	9	Sean White		(substituted off) 61'
N8	8	Aaron Carpenter		(substituted off) 34'	(substituted on) 40'	(substituted off) 53'
OF	7	Adam Kleeberger
BF	6	Chauncey O'Toole		(substituted off) 71'
RL	5	Tyler Hotson
LL	4	Josh Jackson		(substituted off) 40'
TP	3	Jason Marshall	(yellow card) 28' to 38'
HK	2	Pat Riordan (c)		(substituted off) 73'
LP	1	Dan Pletch		(substituted off) 40'
Replacements:
PR	16	Tom Dolezel		(substituted on) 73'
PR	17	Kevin Tkachuk		(substituted on) 34'
LK	18	Jon Phelan		(substituted on) 40'
FL	19	Jebb Sinclair		(substituted on) 71'
N8	20	Sean-Michael Stephen		(substituted on) 53'
SH	21	Jamie Mackenzie		(substituted on) 61'
CE	22	Nick Blevins		(substituted on) 71'
Coach:
(New Zealand) Kieran Crowley

Touch judges:
João Mourinha (Portugal)
Alfonso Mirat (Spain)

13 November 2010
18:00 CET/GMT+01 (UTC+01)

France	34–12	Fiji
Try: Marty 32' c Médard 42' m Penalty try 68' c Con: Yachvili (2/3) 33', 69'; Pen: Yachvili (5/6) 2', 20', 40', 44', 56'	Report	Pen: Bai (4/4) 13', 16', 48', 54'

Stade de la Beaujoire, Nantes
Attendance: 35,717
Referee: Andrew Small (England)

FB	15	Jérôme Porical
RW	14	Julien Arias
OC	13	David Marty
IC	12	Fabrice Estebanez
LW	11	Maxime Médard	(substituted off) 77'
FH	10	Damien Traille	(substituted off) 68'
SH	9	Dimitri Yachvili	(substituted off) 77'
N8	8	Imanol Harinordoquy (c)	(substituted off) 55'
OF	7	Alexandre Lapandry
BF	6	Fulgence Ouedraogo
RL	5	Jérôme Thion
LL	4	Romain Millo-Chluski	(substituted off) 68'
TP	3	Luc Ducalcon
HK	2	Guilhem Guirado	(substituted off) 55'
LP	1	Jérôme Schuster
Replacements:
HK	16	Benjamin Noirot	(substituted on) 55'
PR	17	Thomas Domingo
LK	18	Julien Pierre	(substituted on) 68'
N8	19	Sébastien Chabal	(substituted on) 55'
SH	20	Morgan Parra	(substituted on) 77'
FH	21	David Skrela	(substituted on) 68'
WG	22	Alexis Palisson	(substituted on) 77'
Coach:
Marc Lièvremont

FB	15	Norman Ligairi	(substituted off) 69'
RW	14	Sireli Naqelevuki	(substituted off) 58'
OC	13	Albert Vulivuli
IC	12	Seru Rabeni
LW	11	Napolioni Nalaga
FH	10	Seremaia Bai
SH	9	Nemia Kenatale	(substituted off) 77'
N8	8	Sisa Koyamaibole
OF	7	Akapusi Qera	(substituted off) 69'
BF	6	Semisi Naevo
RL	5	Jone Qovu
LL	4	Wame Lewaravu	(substituted off) 72'
TP	3	Deacon Manu (c)
HK	2	Talemaitoga Tuapati	(substituted off) 72'
LP	1	Graham Dewes
Replacements:
HK	16	Viliame Veikoso	(substituted on) 72'
PR	17	Setefano Somoca
LK	18	Sekonaia Kalou	(substituted on) 72'
FL	19	Malakai Ravulo	(substituted on) 69'
SH	20	Seveci Taka	(substituted on) 77'
FB	21	Josh Matavesi	(substituted on) 69'
WG	22	Gabiriele Lovobalavu	(substituted on) 58'
Coach:
(Fiji) Sam Domoni

Touch judges:
Nigel Owens (Wales)
James Jones (Wales)
Television match official:
Carlo Damasco (Italy)

13 November 2010
17:15 BT/GMT+0 (UTC+0)

Scotland	3–49	New Zealand
Pen: Parks 3'	Report	Try: Gear (2) 9' c, 26' c Carter 11' c Muliaina (2) 18' c, 48' c Smith 67' c Ellis 78' c Con: Carter (5/5); Donald (2/2)

Murrayfield Stadium, Edinburgh
Attendance: 56,807
Referee: Dave Pearson (England)

FB	15	Hugo Southwell
RW	14	Rory Lamont	(substituted off) 41'
OC	13	Max Evans
IC	12	Graeme Morrison
LW	11	Sean Lamont
FH	10	Dan Parks	(substituted off) 67'
SH	9	Mike Blair (c)	(substituted off) 38'
N8	8	Richie Vernon
OF	7	John Barclay
BF	6	Kelly Brown	(substituted off) 65'
RL	5	Richie Gray
LL	4	Jim Hamilton	(substituted off) 41'
TP	3	Euan Murray 20' to 31'	(substituted off) 65'
HK	2	Ross Ford	(substituted off) 65'
LP	1	Allan Jacobsen
Replacements:
HK	16	Scott Lawson	(substituted on) 65'
PR	17	Alasdair Dickinson	(substituted on) 20'	(substituted off) 31'	(substituted on) 65'
LK	18	Nathan Hines	(substituted on) 41'
FL	19	Ross Rennie	(substituted on) 65'
SH	20	Greig Laidlaw	(substituted on) 38'
FH	21	Ruaridh Jackson	(substituted on) 67'
WG	22	Nikki Walker	(substituted on) 41'
Coach:
(England) Andy Robinson

FB	15	Mils Muliaina
RW	14	Isaia Toeava
OC	13	Conrad Smith
IC	12	Sonny Bill Williams
LW	11	Hosea Gear
FH	10	Dan Carter	(substituted off) 50'
SH	9	Jimmy Cowan	(substituted off) 58'
N8	8	Kieran Read
OF	7	Richie McCaw (c)	(substituted off) 57'
BF	6	Liam Messam
RL	5	Sam Whitelock
LL	4	Brad Thorn	(substituted off) 57'
TP	3	Owen Franks	(substituted off) 53'
HK	2	Hika Elliot	(substituted off) 61'
LP	1	Tony Woodcock
Replacements:
HK	16	Andrew Hore	(substituted on) 61'
PR	17	John Afoa	(substituted on) 53'
LK	18	Anthony Boric	(substituted on) 57'
FL	19	Daniel Braid	(substituted on) 57'
SH	20	Andy Ellis	(substituted on) 58'
FH	21	Stephen Donald	(substituted on) 50'
CE	22	Ma'a Nonu
Coach:
Graham Henry

Touch judges:
Wayne Barnes (England)
Robin Goodliffe (England)
Television match official:
Giulio De Santis (Italy)

- Two of the All Blacks squad—captain Richie McCaw and Mils Muliaina—drew level with Sean Fitzpatrick as New Zealand's most-capped players, with 92 each.

19 November 2010
20:00 CET/GMT+01 (UTC+01)

Italy A	9–16	Tonga
	Report

Stadio Vittorio Pozzo Lamarmora, Biella
Attendance: 2,000
Referee: John Lacey (Ireland)

19 November 2010
19:30 BT/GMT+0 (UTC+0)

Scotland A	25–0	United States
Try: Jones (2), Traynor; Con: Blair (2); Pen: Blair (2)	Report

Netherdale, Galashiels
Referee: Mathieu Raynal (France)

19 November 2010
19:30 BT/GMT+0 (UTC+0)

Wales	16–16	Fiji
Try: Penalty try 59' c Con: S. Jones (1/1); Pen: Biggar (2/3) 6', 21'; S. Jones (1/1) 63'	Report	Try: Vulivuli 36' c Con: Bai (1/1); Pen: Bai (2/3) 13', 80'+2'; Matavesi (1/1) 24'

Millennium Stadium, Cardiff
Attendance: 55,000
Referee: Jérôme Garcès (France)

FB	15	Lee Byrne
RW	14	George North
OC	13	James Hook
IC	12	Andrew Bishop	(substituted off) 49'
LW	11	Aled Brew
FH	10	Dan Biggar	(substituted off) 49'
SH	9	Richie Rees	(substituted off) 49'
N8	8	Jonathan Thomas
OF	7	Dan Lydiate
BF	6	Ryan Jones (c)
RL	5	Deiniol Jones
LL	4	Ian Gough	(substituted off) 49'
TP	3	Adam Jones
HK	2	Huw Bennett
LP	1	Paul James
Replacements:
HK	16	Richard Hibbard
PR	17	John Yapp
LK	18	Bradley Davies	(substituted on) 49'
FL	19	Taulupe Faletau
SH	20	Mike Phillips	(substituted on) 49'
FH	21	Stephen Jones	(substituted on) 49'
CE	22	Tom Shanklin	(substituted on) 49'
Coach:
(New Zealand) Warren Gatland

FB	15	Josh Matavesi
RW	14	Michael Tagicakibau		(substituted off) 49'
OC	13	Albert Vulivuli		(substituted off) 66'
IC	12	Gabiriele Lovobalavu
LW	11	Vereniki Goneva
FH	10	Seremaia Bai	(yellow card) 21' to 31'
SH	9	Nemia Kenatale		(substituted off) 54'
N8	8	Sisa Koyamaibole		(substituted off) 49'
OF	7	Malakai Ravulo		(substituted off) 74'
BF	6	Semisi Naevo
RL	5	Jone Qovu
LL	4	Ifereimi Rawaqa
TP	3	Deacon Manu (c)
HK	2	Viliame Veikoso		(substituted off) 52'
LP	1	Campese Ma'afu		(substituted off) 58'
Replacements:
HK	16	Talemaitoga Tuapati		(substituted on) 52'
PR	17	Graham Dewes		(substituted on) 58'
LK	18	Sekonaia Kalou		(substituted on) 74'
FL	19	Akapusi Qera		(substituted on) 49'
SH	20	Seveci Taka		(substituted on) 54'
CE	21	Ropate Ratu		(substituted on) 49'
FB	22	Taniela Rawaqa		(substituted on) 66'
Coach:
Sam Domoni

Touch judges:
Steve Walsh (Australia)
Rob Debney (England)
Television match official:
Daniel Gillet (France)

20 November 2010
14:00 GT (UTC+04)

Georgia	22–15	Canada
Try: Penalty try Urjukashvili; Zirakashvili; Con: Kvirikashvili; Malaghuradze; Pen: Malaghuradze	Report	Try: Marshall; Carpenter; Con: Pritchard; Pen: Pritchard

Boris Paichadze Dinamo Arena, Tbilisi
Attendance: 25,000
Referee: Pascal Gaüzère (France)

FB	15	Malkhaz Urjukashvili
RW	14	Irakli Machkhaneli
OC	13	Irakli Chkhikvadze
IC	12	Teodore Zibzibadze
LW	11	Lekso Gugava
FH	10	Lasha Malaghuradze
SH	9	Irakli Abuseridze (c)
N8	8	Besarion Udesiani
OF	7	Giorgi Chkhaidze
BF	6	Grigol Labadze
RL	5	Levan Datunashvili
LL	4	Shalva Sutiashvili
TP	3	Davit Zirakashvili
HK	2	Akvsenti Giorgadze
LP	1	Davit Khinchagishvili
Replacements:
HK	16	Iuri Natriashvili
PR	17	Goderdzi Shvelidze
LK	18	Giorgi Nemsadze
FL	19	Simon Maisuradze
SH	20	Bidzina Samkharadze
CE	21	David Kacharava
FH	22	Merab Kvirikashvili
Coach:
(Scotland) Richard Dixon

FB	15	Ciaran Hearn
RW	14	Justin Mensah-Coker
OC	13	D. T. H. van der Merwe
IC	12	Phil Mackenzie
LW	11	James Pritchard
FH	10	Connor Braid
SH	9	Sean White
N8	8	Aaron Carpenter
OF	7	Adam Kleeberger
BF	6	Chauncey O'Toole
RL	5	Jebb Sinclair
LL	4	Josh Jackson
TP	3	Jason Marshall
HK	2	Pat Riordan (c)
LP	1	Kevin Tkachuk
Replacements:
HK	16	Tom Dolezel
PR	17	Andrew Tiedemann
LK	18	Jon Phelan
LK	19	Tyler Hotson
FL	20	Sean-Michael Stephen
SH	21	Jamie Mackenzie
CE	22	Nick Blevins
Coach:
(New Zealand) Kieran Crowley

Touch judges:
Ucha Narimanidze (Georgia)
Gia Amirkhanashvili (Georgia)

20 November 2010
15:00 CET/GMT+01 (UTC+01)

Italy	14–32	Australia
Try: Barbieri 71' m Pen: Bergamasco (2) 11', 40'; Orquera 35'	Report	Try: Mitchell 9' c Elsom 80' c Con: Barnes (2/2); Pen: Barnes (6/6) 2', 13', 50', 53', 59', 67'

Stadio Artemio Franchi, Florence
Attendance: 40,127
Referee: Christophe Berdos (France)

FB	15	Luke McLean
RW	14	Tommaso Benvenuti
OC	13	Gonzalo Canale
IC	12	Alberto Sgarbi	(substituted off) 60'
LW	11	Mirco Bergamasco
FH	10	Luciano Orquera	(substituted off) 67'
SH	9	Edoardo Gori	(substituted off) 60'
N8	8	Sergio Parisse (c)
OF	7	Alessandro Zanni
BF	6	Paul Derbyshire	(substituted off) 55'
RL	5	Quintin Geldenhuys
LL	4	Carlo Del Fava	(substituted off) 67'
TP	3	Martin Castrogiovanni	(substituted off) 55'
HK	2	Fabio Ongaro	(substituted off) 48'
LP	1	Andrea Lo Cicero
Replacements:
HK	16	Carlo Festuccia	(substituted on) 48'
PR	17	Lorenzo Cittadini	(substituted on) 55'
LK	18	Santiago Dellapè	(substituted on) 67'
FL	19	Robert Barbieri	(substituted on) 55'
UB	20	Pablo Canavosio	(substituted on) 60'
FH	21	Riccardo Bocchino	(substituted on) 67'
CE	22	Andrea Masi	(substituted on) 60'
Coach:
(South Africa) Nick Mallett

FB	15	Kurtley Beale
RW	14	Lachie Turner
OC	13	Adam Ashley-Cooper		(substituted off) 79'
IC	12	Berrick Barnes
LW	11	Drew Mitchell
FH	10	Quade Cooper
SH	9	Luke Burgess
N8	8	Ben McCalman
OF	7	David Pocock		(substituted off) 67'
BF	6	Rocky Elsom (c)
RL	5	Nathan Sharpe		(substituted off) 67'
LL	4	Rob Simmons
TP	3	Ben Alexander
HK	2	Stephen Moore	67' to 73'
LP	1	James Slipper		(substituted off) 67'
Replacements:
HK	16	Tatafu Polota-Nau		(substituted on) 67'
PR	17	Benn Robinson		(substituted on) 67'	(substituted off) 73'
LK	18	Mark Chisholm		(substituted on) 67'
FL	19	Matt Hodgson		(substituted on) 67'
SH	20	Will Genia
CE	21	Matt Giteau
WG	22	Pat McCabe		(substituted on) 79'
Coach:
(New Zealand) Robbie Deans

Touch judges:
Romain Poite (France)
Tim Hayes (Wales)
Television match official:
Geoff Warren (England)

20 November 2010
14:30 BT/GMT+0 (UTC+0)

England	26–13	Samoa
Try: Banahan 47' c Croft 72' c Con: Flood (2/2); Pen: Flood (4/5) 16', 26', 52', 70'	Report	Try: P. Williams 41' m Otto 79' m Pen: P. Williams (1/3) 4'

Twickenham Stadium, London
Attendance: 70,553
Referee: Peter Fitzgibbon (Ireland)

FB	15	Ben Foden
RW	14	Chris Ashton	(substituted off) 75'
OC	13	Matt Banahan
IC	12	Shontayne Hape	(substituted off) 75'
LW	11	Mark Cueto
FH	10	Toby Flood
SH	9	Ben Youngs	(substituted off) 68'
N8	8	Nick Easter (c)
OF	7	Hendre Fourie
BF	6	James Haskell	(substituted off) 68'
RL	5	Tom Palmer
LL	4	Courtney Lawes	(substituted off) 67'
TP	3	David Wilson	(substituted off) 56'
HK	2	Dylan Hartley	(substituted off) 56'
LP	1	Andrew Sheridan
Replacements:
HK	16	Steve Thompson	(substituted on) 56'
PR	17	Dan Cole	(substituted on) 56'
LK	18	Dave Attwood	(substituted on) 67'
FL	19	Tom Croft	(substituted on) 68'
SH	20	Danny Care	(substituted on) 68'
FH	21	Charlie Hodgson	(substituted on) 75'
CE	22	Delon Armitage	(substituted on) 75'
Coach:
(England) Martin Johnson

FB	15	Paul Williams
RW	14	David Lemi		(substituted off) 59'
OC	13	George Pisi		(substituted off) 75'
IC	12	Seilala Mapusua
LW	11	Alesana Tuilagi
FH	10	Tasesa Lavea		(substituted off) 66'
SH	9	Kahn Fotuali'i
N8	8	George Stowers
OF	7	Manaia Salave'a
BF	6	Ofisa Treviranus		(substituted off) 64'
RL	5	Filipo Levi
LL	4	Kane Thompson		(substituted off) 40'
TP	3	Anthony Perenise		(substituted off) 67'
HK	2	Mahonri Schwalger (c)		(substituted off) 48'
LP	1	Sakaria Taulafo	12' to 19'
Replacements:
HK	16	Ti’i Paulo		(substituted on) 48'
PR	17	Census Johnston		(substituted on) 12'	(substituted off) 19'	(substituted on) 67'
LK	18	Joe Tekori		(substituted on) 40'
FL	19	Afa Aiono		(substituted on) 64'
SH	20	Junior Poluleuligaga		(substituted on) 66'
CE	21	Gavin Williams		(substituted on) 75'
WG	22	Fautua Otto		(substituted on) 59'
Coach:
Fuimaono Tafua

Touch judges:
Alan Lewis (Ireland)
Cobus Wessels (South Africa)
Television match official:
Giulio De Santis (Italy)

20 November 2010
14:30 BT/GMT+0 (UTC+0)

Scotland	21–17	South Africa
Pen: Parks (6/6) 16', 23', 29', 53', 62', 68'; Drop: Parks (1/2) 19'	Report	Try: Alberts 70' m Pen: M. Steyn (4/5) 2', 12', 36', 46'

Murrayfield Stadium, Edinburgh
Attendance: 35,555
Referee: Stuart Dickinson (Australia)

FB	15	Hugo Southwell
RW	14	Nikki Walker	(substituted off) 73'
OC	13	Joe Ansbro
IC	12	Graeme Morrison
LW	11	Sean Lamont
FH	10	Dan Parks
SH	9	Rory Lawson (c)
N8	8	Kelly Brown	(substituted off) 78'
OF	7	John Barclay
BF	6	Nathan Hines
RL	5	Richie Gray
LL	4	Scott MacLeod	(substituted off) 34'
TP	3	Euan Murray	(substituted off) 69'
HK	2	Ross Ford	(substituted off) 68'
LP	1	Allan Jacobsen
Replacements:
HK	16	Dougie Hall	(substituted on) 68'
PR	17	Moray Low	(substituted on) 69'
N8	18	Richie Vernon	(substituted on) 34'
FL	19	Ross Rennie	(substituted on) 78'
SH	20	Greig Laidlaw
FH	21	Ruaridh Jackson
WG	22	Chris Paterson	(substituted on) 73'
Coach:
(England) Andy Robinson

FB	15	Zane Kirchner
RW	14	Gio Aplon
OC	13	François Steyn
IC	12	Jean de Villiers
LW	11	Lwazi Mvovo
FH	10	Morné Steyn	(substituted off) 63'
SH	9	Francois Hougaard	(substituted off) 46'
N8	8	Ryan Kankowski
OF	7	Juan Smith
BF	6	Deon Stegmann	(substituted off) 46'
RL	5	Victor Matfield (c)
LL	4	Bakkies Botha	(substituted off) 64'
TP	3	Jannie du Plessis
HK	2	Bismarck du Plessis	(substituted off) 73'
LP	1	Tendai Mtawarira	(substituted off) 72'
Replacements:
HK	16	Adriaan Strauss	(substituted on) 73'
PR	17	CJ van der Linde	(substituted on) 72'
LK	18	Flip van der Merwe	(substituted on) 64'
FL	19	Willem Alberts	(substituted on) 46'
SH	20	Ruan Pienaar	(substituted on) 46'
CE	21	Adi Jacobs
FH	22	Patrick Lambie	(substituted on) 63'
Coach:
(South Africa) Peter de Villiers

Touch judges:
Alain Rolland (Ireland)
Francisco Pastrana (Argentina)
Television match official:
Tony Redmond (Ireland)

20 November 2010
15:00 WET/GMT+0 (UTC+0)

Portugal	24–12	Namibia
Try: Bardy; G. Uva; Con: Gardener; Pen: Gardener (4)	Report	Pen: Jantjies (4)

Estádio Municipal Sérgio Conceição, Coimbra
Referee: Greg Garner (England)

FB	15	Pedro Leal
RW	14	José Lima
OC	13	Frederico Oliveira
IC	12	Pedro Silva
LW	11	António Aguilar
FH	10	Joseph Gardener
SH	9	José Pinto
N8	8	Tiago Girão
OF	7	Julien Bardy
BF	6	Vasco Uva
RL	5	Juan Severino
LL	4	Gonçalo Uva
TP	3	Anthony Alves
HK	2	João Correia (c)
LP	1	Francisco Fernandes
Replacements:
HK	16	Bernardo Duarte
PR	17	João Junior
LK	18	Rui D'Orey
FL	19	Laurent Balangué
FH	20	Pedro Cabral
CE	21	Francisco Mira
WG	22	Gonçalo Foro
Coach:
(New Zealand) Errol Brain

FB	15	Chrysander Botha
RW	14	McGrath van Wyk
OC	13	Piet van Zyl
IC	12	Darryl de la Harpe
LW	11	Conrad Marais
FH	10	Jacky Bock
SH	9	Eugene Jantjies
N8	8	PJ van Lill
OF	7	Jacques Burger (c)
BF	6	Tinus du Plessis
RL	5	Nico Esterhuyse
LL	4	Heinz Koll
TP	3	Marius Visser
HK	2	Shaun Esterhuisen
LP	1	Johnny Redelinghuys
Replacements:
HK	16	Egbertus O'Callaghan
PR	17	Casper Viviers
LK	18	Morné Blom
FL	19	Rohan Kitshoff
SH	20	Colin de Koe
FH	21	Godwin Walters
CE	22	Attie du Plessis
Coach:
Johan Diergaardt

20 November 2010
17:30 IST/GMT+0 (UTC+0)

Ireland	18–38	New Zealand
Try: Ferris 31' c B. O'Driscoll 57' m Con: Sexton 31'; Pen: Sexton (2) 11', 27'	Report	Try: Boric 40' c Read (2) 45' c, 80' m Whitelock 49' c Con: Carter (3) 40', 45', 49'; Pen: Carter (4) 8', 16', 30', 36'

Aviva Stadium, Dublin
Attendance: 46,302
Referee: Marius Jonker (South Africa)

FB	15	Rob Kearney	(substituted off) 76'
RW	14	Tommy Bowe
OC	13	Brian O'Driscoll (c)
IC	12	Gordon D'Arcy
LW	11	Luke Fitzgerald	(substituted off) 47'
FH	10	Johnny Sexton
SH	9	Eoin Reddan	(substituted off) 65'
N8	8	Jamie Heaslip
OF	7	David Wallace	(substituted off) 65'
BF	6	Stephen Ferris
RL	5	Mick O'Driscoll	(substituted off) 50'
LL	4	Donncha O'Callaghan
TP	3	Tom Court	(substituted off) 65'
HK	2	Rory Best	(substituted off) 23'
LP	1	Cian Healy
Replacements:
HK	16	Seán Cronin	(substituted on) 23'
PR	17	John Hayes	(substituted on) 65'
LK	18	Devin Toner	(substituted on) 50'
FL	19	Denis Leamy	(substituted on) 65'
SH	20	Peter Stringer	(substituted on) 65'
FH	21	Ronan O'Gara	(substituted on) 76'
CE	22	Keith Earls	(substituted on) 47'
Coach:
(Ireland) Declan Kidney

FB	15	Mils Muliaina
RW	14	Cory Jane
OC	13	Conrad Smith
IC	12	Ma'a Nonu	(substituted off) 58'
LW	11	Hosea Gear
FH	10	Dan Carter
SH	9	Andy Ellis	(substituted off) 58'
N8	8	Kieran Read
OF	7	Richie McCaw (c)
BF	6	Jerome Kaino
RL	5	Tom Donnelly	(substituted off) 41'
LL	4	Anthony Boric
TP	3	Owen Franks	(substituted off) 66'
HK	2	Hika Elliot	(substituted off) 58'
LP	1	Tony Woodcock
Replacements:
HK	16	Andrew Hore	(substituted on) 58'
PR	17	John Afoa	(substituted on) 66'
LK	18	Sam Whitelock	(substituted on) 41'
FL	19	Liam Messam
SH	20	Alby Mathewson	(substituted on) 58'
FH	21	Stephen Donald
CE	22	Sonny Bill Williams	(substituted on) 58'
Coach:
(New Zealand) Graham Henry

Touch judges:
Craig Joubert (South Africa)
Carlo Damasco (Italy)
Television match official:
Hugh Watkins (Wales)

- New Zealand's Richie McCaw and Mils Muliaina earned their 93rd caps, surpassing Sean Fitzpatrick as the most-capped All Blacks.

20 November 2010
20:45 CET/GMT+01 (UTC+01)

France	15–9	Argentina
Pen: Parra (4/6) 11', 26', 32', 60'; Drop: Traille (1/1) 49'	Report	Pen: Contepomi (3/3) 17', 47', 62'

Stade de la Mosson, Montpellier
Attendance: 34,993
Referee: Jonathan Kaplan (South Africa)

FB	15	Alexis Palisson
RW	14	Yoann Huget
OC	13	Aurélien Rougerie	(substituted off) 79'
IC	12	Yannick Jauzion
LW	11	Marc Andreu
FH	10	Damien Traille	(substituted off) 78'
SH	9	Morgan Parra	(substituted off) 78'
N8	8	Sébastien Chabal	(substituted off) 62'
OF	7	Julien Bonnaire
BF	6	Thierry Dusautoir (c)
RL	5	Lionel Nallet
LL	4	Julien Pierre	(substituted off) 56'
TP	3	Nicolas Mas
HK	2	William Servat	(substituted off) 66'
LP	1	Thomas Domingo	(substituted off) 56'
Replacements:
HK	16	Guilhem Guirado	(substituted on) 66'
PR	17	Luc Ducalcon	(substituted on) 56'
LK	18	Jérôme Thion	(substituted on) 56'
N8	19	Imanol Harinordoquy	(substituted on) 62'
SH	20	Dimitri Yachvili	(substituted on) 78'
CE	21	Fabrice Estebanez	(substituted on) 78'
FB	22	Jérôme Porical	(substituted on) 79'
Coach:
(France) Marc Lièvremont

FB	15	Martín Rodríguez
RW	14	Gonzalo Camacho
OC	13	Gonzalo Tiesi
IC	12	Santiago Fernández	(substituted off) 66'
LW	11	Lucas González Amorosino
FH	10	Felipe Contepomi (c)
SH	9	Nicolás Vergallo
N8	8	Juan Martín Fernández Lobbe
OF	7	Miguel de Achaval	(substituted off) 40'
BF	6	Genaro Fessia	(substituted off) 66'
RL	5	Patricio Albacete
LL	4	Mariano Galarza
TP	3	Martín Scelzo	(substituted off) 50'	(substituted on) 66'
HK	2	Mario Ledesma	(substituted off) 64'
LP	1	Rodrigo Roncero	(substituted off) 66'
Replacements:
HK	16	Agustín Creevy	(substituted on) 64'
PR	17	Marcos Ayerza	(substituted on) 50'
LK	18	Santiago Guzmán
LK	19	Julio Farías Cabello	(substituted on) 40'
FL	20	Alvaro Galindo	(substituted on) 66'
SH	21	Alfredo Lalanne
FB	22	Marcelo Bosch	(substituted on) 66'
Coach:
(Argentina) Santiago Phelan

Touch judges:
Nigel Owens (Wales)
Andy Macpherson (Scotland)
Television match official:
Jim Yuille (Scotland)

26 November 2010
20:45 CET/GMT+01 (UTC+01)

French Barbarians (France)	27–28	Tonga
Try: Caucaunibuca 50' c Kelleher 60' c Hayman 64' c Con: Baby (3/3) 50', 60', 64'; Pen: Élissalde (1/1) 31'; Baby (1/2) 56'	Report	Try: Lilo 66' c Malupo 70' m Pulu 75' c Con: Fisilau (2/3) 66', 75'; Pen: Fisilau (3/4) 3', 43', 47'

Stade des Alpes, Grenoble
Referee: JP Doyle (England)

FB	15	(France) Cédric Heymans
RW	14	(Fiji) Rupeni Caucaunibuca	(substituted off) 48'
OC	13	(France) Mathieu Bastareaud	(substituted off) 65'
IC	12	(France) Maxime Mermoz
LW	11	(France) Vincent Clerc
FH	10	(France) Jean-Baptiste Élissalde	(substituted off) 44'
SH	9	(New Zealand) Byron Kelleher (c)
N8	8	(France) Louis Picamoles	(substituted off) 48'
OF	7	(New Zealand) Chris Masoe
BF	6	(Australia) George Smith
RL	5	(France) Yoann Maestri	(substituted off) 57'
LL	4	(South Africa) Robbin Linde
TP	3	(New Zealand) Carl Hayman	(substituted off) 70'
HK	2	(France) Benjamin Kayser	(substituted off) 48'
LP	1	(France) Sylvain Marconnet	(substituted off) 52'
Replacements:
HK	16	(France) Benoît Cabello	(substituted on) 48'
PR	17	(France) Lionel Faure	(substituted on) 70'
LK	18	(France) Loïc Jacquet	(substituted on) 57'
FL	19	(France) Rémy Martin	(substituted on) 48'
SH	20	(France) Jérôme Fillol	(substituted on) 65'
CE	21	(France) Benoît Baby	(substituted on) 44'
WG	22	(France) Benjamin Fall	(substituted on) 48'
PR	23	(France) Jean-Baptiste Poux	(substituted on) 52'
Coach:
(France) Guy Novès

FB	15	Vunga Lilo
RW	14	Mateo Malupo
OC	13	Alaska Taufa	(substituted off) 70'
IC	12	Andrew Mailei
LW	11	William Helu
FH	10	Samisoni Fisilau
SH	9	David Palu	(substituted off) 41'
N8	8	Samiu Vahafolau
OF	7	Finau Maka (c)
BF	6	Lua Lokotui
RL	5	Emosi Kauhenga	(substituted off) 57'
LL	4	Paino Hehea
TP	3	Kisi Pulu	(substituted off) 78'
HK	2	Ephraim Taukafa	(substituted off) 48'
LP	1	Semisi Telefoni	(substituted off) 67'
Replacements:
HK	16	Ilaisa Maʻasi	(substituted on) 48'
PR	17	Ofa Faingaʻanuku	(substituted on) 67'
LK	18	Lisiate Faʻaoso	(substituted on) 57'
FL	19	Ueleni Fono
FH	20	Tomasi Palu
SH	21	Soane Havea	(substituted on) 41'
CE	22	Isileli Tupou	(substituted on) 70'
PR	23	Viliami Pola	(substituted on) 78'
Coach:
(New Zealand) Isitolo Maka

Touch judges:
Jérôme Garces (France)
Frank Maciello (France)
Television match official:
Gilles Cogne (France)

- The traditionally uncapped player of the Barbarians' side was Brive's Benoît Cabello.
- This match was Jean-Baptiste Élissalde's jubilee, as he came out of retirement for the game after having been named Toulouse's backs coach prior to the start of the 2010–11 season.

27 November 2010
14:00 GT (UTC+04)

Georgia	19–17	United States
Try: Gugava; Con: Kvirikashvili; Pen: Malaghuradze (3); Kvirikashvili	Report	Try: Emerick; Con: Malifa; Drop: Malifa; Wyles

Boris Paichadze National Stadium, Tbilisi
Attendance: 35,000
Referee: Peter Allan (Scotland)

FB	15	Bessik Khamashuridze
RW	14	Irakli Machkhaneli
OC	13	Irakli Chkhikvadze
IC	12	Teodore Zibzibadze
LW	11	Lekso Gugava
FH	10	Lasha Malaghuradze
SH	9	Irakli Abuseridze (c)
N8	8	Besarion Udesiani
OF	7	Giorgi Chkhaidze
BF	6	Simon Maisuradze
RL	5	Levan Datunashvili
LL	4	Shalva Sutiashvili
TP	3	David Kubriashvili
HK	2	Akvsenti Giorgadze
LP	1	Goderdzi Shvelidze
Replacements:
HK	16	Iuri Natriashvili
PR	17	Davit Zirakashvili
N8	18	Viktor Kolelishvili
LK	19	Giorgi Nemsadze
SH	20	Bidzina Samkharadze
CE	21	David Kacharava
FB	22	Merab Kvirikashvili
Coach:
(Scotland) Richard Dixon

FB	15	Chris Wyles
RW	14	Takudzwa Ngwenya
OC	13	Paul Emerick
IC	12	Andrew Suniula
LW	11	Kevin Swiryn
FH	10	Nese Malifa
SH	9	Tim Usasz
N8	8	Inaki Basauri
OF	7	Todd Clever (c)
BF	6	Louis Stanfill
RL	5	Hayden Smith
LL	4	Samu Manoa
TP	3	Shawn Pittman
HK	2	Phil Thiel
LP	1	Matekitonga Moeakiola
Replacements:
HK	16	Chris Biller
PR	17	Mike MacDonald
LK	18	Scott LaValla
N8	19	Nic Johnson
SH	20	Mike Petri
FH	21	Tai Enosa
CE	22	Seta Tuilevuka
Coach:
(Ireland) Eddie O'Sullivan

Touch judges:
Andrew Healy (Scotland)
Allan Forrest (Scotland)

27 November 2010
15:00 CET/GMT+01 (UTC+01)

Italy	24–16	Fiji
Pen: Mi. Bergamasco (8) 11', 19', 35', 45', 52', 60', 75', 79'	Report	Try: Tuapati 8' c Con: Bai (1/1); Pen: Bai (3) 24', 27', 39'

Stadio Alberto Braglia, Modena
Attendance: 20,000
Referee: Dave Pearson (England)

FB	15	Luke McLean
RW	14	Andrea Masi		(substituted off) 57'
OC	13	Gonzalo Canale
IC	12	Alberto Sgarbi
LW	11	Mirco Bergamasco
FH	10	Luciano Orquera		(substituted off) 50'
SH	9	Edoardo Gori
N8	8	Sergio Parisse (c)
OF	7	Robert Barbieri		(substituted off) 69'
BF	6	Alessandro Zanni
RL	5	Quintin Geldenhuys
LL	4	Carlo Del Fava		(substituted off) 7'
TP	3	Martin Castrogiovanni	(yellow card) 39' to 49'
HK	2	Fabio Ongaro		(substituted off) 50'
LP	1	Salvatore Perugini		(substituted off) 60'
Replacements:
HK	16	Carlo Festuccia		(substituted on) 50'
PR	17	Andrea Lo Cicero		(substituted on) 60'
LK	18	Santiago Dellapè		(substituted on) 7'
FL	19	Paul Derbyshire		(substituted on) 50'
SH	20	Pablo Canavosio
FH	21	Riccardo Bocchino		(substituted on) 50'
WG	22	Tommaso Benvenuti		(substituted on) 57'
Coach:
(South Africa) Nick Mallett

FB	15	Norman Ligairi
RW	14	Vereniki Goneva	(substituted off) 60'
OC	13	Albert Vulivuli
IC	12	Gabiriele Lovobalavu
LW	11	Napolioni Nalaga
FH	10	Seremaia Bai
SH	9	Nemia Kenatale
N8	8	Sisa Koyamaibole	(substituted off) 53'
OF	7	Akapusi Qera	(substituted off) 69'
BF	6	Semisi Naevo
RL	5	Jone Qovu
LL	4	Wame Lewaravu
TP	3	Deacon Manu (c)
HK	2	Talemaitoga Tuapati	(substituted off) 74'
LP	1	Campese Ma'afu	(substituted off) 69'
Replacements:
HK	16	Viliame Veikoso	(substituted on) 74'
PR	17	Vesi Rarawa	(substituted on) 69'
LK	18	Sekonaia Kalou	(substituted on) 53'
FL	19	Jimilai Nakaidawa	(substituted on) 69'
SH	20	Seveci Taka
CE	21	Seru Rabeni	(substituted on) 60'
FB	22	Taniela Rawaqa
Coach:
(Fiji) Sam Domoni

Touch judges:
Christophe Berdos (France)
James Jones (Wales)
Television match official:
Graham Hughes (England)

27 November 2010
14:30 BT/GMT+0 (UTC+0)

England	11–21	South Africa
Try: Foden 79' m Pen: Flood (2/2) 5', 17'	Report	Try: Alberts 59' m Mvovo 70' c Con: M. Steyn (1/2); Pen: M. Steyn (3/4) 10', 35', 42'

Twickenham Stadium, London
Attendance: 80,793
Referee: George Clancy (Ireland)

FB	15	Ben Foden
RW	14	Chris Ashton	(substituted off) 72'
OC	13	Mike Tindall
IC	12	Shontayne Hape
LW	11	Mark Cueto
FH	10	Toby Flood	(substituted off) 33'
SH	9	Ben Youngs	(substituted off) 61'
N8	8	Nick Easter
OF	7	Lewis Moody (c)
BF	6	Tom Croft	(substituted off) 21'
RL	5	Tom Palmer
LL	4	Courtney Lawes	(substituted off) 67'
TP	3	Dan Cole	(substituted off) 67'
HK	2	Dylan Hartley	(substituted off) 73'
LP	1	Andrew Sheridan
Replacements:
HK	16	Steve Thompson	(substituted on) 73'
PR	17	David Wilson	(substituted on) 67'
LK	18	Simon Shaw	(substituted on) 67'
FL	19	Hendre Fourie	(substituted on) 21'
SH	20	Danny Care	(substituted on) 61'
FH	21	Charlie Hodgson	(substituted on) 33'
CE	22	Matt Banahan	(substituted on) 72'
Coach:
Martin Johnson

FB	15	Zane Kirchner		(substituted off) 47'
RW	14	Gio Aplon	60' to 67'	(substituted off) 78'
OC	13	François Steyn
IC	12	Jean de Villiers		(substituted off) 67'
LW	11	Lwazi Mvovo
FH	10	Morné Steyn
SH	9	Ruan Pienaar
N8	8	Pierre Spies
OF	7	Juan Smith
BF	6	Deon Stegmann		(substituted off) 48'
RL	5	Victor Matfield (c)
LL	4	Bakkies Botha		(substituted off) 66'
TP	3	Jannie du Plessis		(substituted off) 52'
HK	2	Bismarck du Plessis		(substituted off) 78'
LP	1	Tendai Mtawarira
Replacements:
HK	16	Adriaan Strauss		(substituted on) 78'
PR	17	CJ van der Linde		(substituted on) 52'
LK	18	Flip van der Merwe		(substituted on) 66'
FL	19	Willem Alberts		(substituted on) 48'
SH	20	Francois Hougaard		(substituted on) 60'
FH	21	Patrick Lambie		(substituted on) 78'
CE	22	Adi Jacobs		(substituted on) 47'
Coach:
Peter de Villiers

Touch judges:
Peter Fitzgibbon (Ireland)
Simon Mcdowell (Ireland)
Television match official:
Iain Ramage (Scotland)

27 November 2010
14:30 BT/GMT+0 (UTC+0)

Scotland	19–16	Samoa
Try: Walker 14' c Con: Parks (1/1); Pen: Parks (2) 2', 29'; Jackson 79'; Drop: Parks (1/1) 52'	Report	Try: Fotuali'i 9' c Con: Williams (1/1); Pen: Williams (3/3) 36', 41', 55'

Pittodrie, Aberdeen
Attendance: 18,290
Referee: Steve Walsh (Australia)

FB	15	Hugo Southwell
RW	14	Nikki Walker
OC	13	Joe Ansbro	(substituted off) 58'
IC	12	Graeme Morrison
LW	11	Sean Lamont
FH	10	Dan Parks	(substituted off) 58'
SH	9	Rory Lawson (c)	(substituted off) 55'
N8	8	Richie Vernon	(substituted off) 74'
OF	7	John Barclay
BF	6	Kelly Brown
RL	5	Richie Gray	(substituted off) 59'
LL	4	Nathan Hines
TP	3	Euan Murray	(substituted off) 59'
HK	2	Ross Ford	(substituted off) 74'
LP	1	Allan Jacobsen
Replacements:
HK	16	Dougie Hall	(substituted on) 74'
PR	17	Moray Low	(substituted on) 59'
LK	18	Jim Hamilton	(substituted on) 59'
FL	19	Ross Rennie	(substituted on) 74'
SH	20	Mike Blair	(substituted on) 55'
FH	21	Ruaridh Jackson	(substituted on) 58'
CE	22	Max Evans	(substituted on) 58'
Coach:
(England) Andy Robinson

FB	15	Paul Williams
RW	14	David Lemi	(substituted off) 73'
OC	13	George Pisi
IC	12	Seilala Mapusua
LW	11	Alesana Tuilagi
FH	10	Tasesa Lavea
SH	9	Kahn Fotuali'i
N8	8	George Stowers
OF	7	Manaia Salave'a	(substituted off) 73'
BF	6	Ofisa Treviranus	(substituted off) 65'
RL	5	Filipo Levi
LL	4	Kane Thompson	(substituted off) 61'
TP	3	Census Johnston	(substituted off) 59'
HK	2	Mahonri Schwalger (c)	(substituted off) 61'
LP	1	Sakaria Taulafo
Replacements:
HK	16	Ti’i Paulo	(substituted on) 61'
PR	17	Anthony Perenise	(substituted on) 59'
LK	18	Joe Tekori	(substituted on) 61'
LK	19	Dan Leo	(substituted on) 73'
FL	20	Afa Aiono	(substituted on) 65'
SH	21	Junior Poluleuligaga
WG	22	Fautua Otto	(substituted on) 73'
Coach:
(Samoa) Fuimaono Tafua

Touch judges:
Marius Jonker (South Africa)
Cobus Wessels (South Africa)
Television match official:
Tony Redmond (Ireland)

27 November 2010
17:15 BT/GMT+0 (UTC+0)

Wales	25–37	New Zealand
Try: Byrne 80' c Con: S. Jones; Pen: S. Jones (6)	Report	Try: Gear (2) 5' m, 54' c Muliaina 22' m Toeava 73' c Afoa 76' c Con: Carter (3/5); Pen: Carter (2)

Millennium Stadium, Cardiff
Attendance: 73,789
Referee: Alan Lewis (Ireland)

FB	15	Lee Byrne
RW	14	George North
OC	13	Tom Shanklin	(substituted off) 79'
IC	12	James Hook
LW	11	Tom James
FH	10	Stephen Jones
SH	9	Mike Phillips	(substituted off) 78'
N8	8	Ryan Jones	(substituted off) 48'
OF	7	Sam Warburton	(substituted off) 75'
BF	6	Dan Lydiate	(substituted off) 48'
RL	5	Alun Wyn Jones
LL	4	Bradley Davies
TP	3	Adam Jones
HK	2	Matthew Rees (c)
LP	1	Gethin Jenkins	(substituted off) 78'
Replacements:
HK	16	Huw Bennett
PR	17	Paul James	(substituted on) 78'
LK	18	Jonathan Thomas	(substituted on) 48'
N8	19	Andy Powell	(substituted on) 48'
FL	20	Martyn Williams	(substituted on) 75'
SH	21	Richie Rees	(substituted on) 78'
CE	22	Andrew Bishop	(substituted on) 79'
Coach:
(New Zealand) Warren Gatland

FB	15	Mils Muliaina
RW	14	Isaia Toeava
OC	13	Conrad Smith
IC	12	Sonny Bill Williams		(substituted off) 49'
LW	11	Hosea Gear
FH	10	Dan Carter		(substituted off) 78'
SH	9	Jimmy Cowan		(substituted off) 77'
N8	8	Kieran Read		(substituted off) 37'
OF	7	Richie McCaw (c)
BF	6	Jerome Kaino
RL	5	Sam Whitelock		(substituted off) 55'
LL	4	Brad Thorn
TP	3	Owen Franks		(substituted off) 62'
HK	2	Keven Mealamu		(substituted off) 75'
LP	1	Tony Woodcock
Replacements:
HK	16	Andrew Hore		(substituted on) 75'
PR	17	John Afoa		(substituted on) 62'
LK	18	Anthony Boric		(substituted on) 55'
FL	19	Daniel Braid	(yellow card) 51' to 61'	(substituted on) 37'
SH	20	Andy Ellis		(substituted on) 77'
FH	21	Stephen Donald		(substituted on) 78'
CE	22	Ma'a Nonu		(substituted on) 49'
Coach:
Graham Henry

Touch judges:
Jonathan Kaplan (South Africa)
David Changleng (Scotland)
Television match official:
Giulio De Santis (Italy)

- With a penalty in the 7th minute, Dan Carter surpassed England's Jonny Wilkinson, who sat out the November Tests due to injury, as the leading Test point scorer in history.

27 November 2010
20:45 CET/GMT+01 (UTC+01)

France	16–59	Australia
Try: Penalty try 30' c Con: Parra (1/1) 30'; Pen: Parra (3/4) 9', 20', 42'	Report	Try: Asley-Cooper 4' c Robinson 49' c Genia 52' c Mitchell (3) 67' c, 73' c, 76' c O'Connor 80' m Con: O'Connor (6/7) 5', 50', 52', 67', 73', 76'; Pen: O'Connor (4/5) 14', 25', 61', 72'

Stade de France, Saint-Denis
Attendance: 59,275
Referee: Bryce Lawrence (New Zealand)

FB	15	Jérôme Porical
RW	14	Yoann Huget
OC	13	Aurélien Rougerie
IC	12	Yannick Jauzion	(substituted off) 54'
LW	11	Alexis Palisson	(substituted off) 40'
FH	10	Damien Traille
SH	9	Morgan Parra	(substituted off) 72'
N8	8	Sébastien Chabal	(substituted off) 61'
OF	7	Fulgence Ouedraogo
BF	6	Thierry Dusautoir (c)
RL	5	Jérôme Thion	(substituted off) 68'
LL	4	Julien Pierre
TP	3	Nicolas Mas
HK	2	William Servat	(substituted off) 35'
LP	1	Thomas Domingo	(substituted off) 51'
Replacements:
HK	16	Guilhem Guirado	(substituted on) 35'
PR	17	Jérôme Schuster	(substituted on) 51'
LK	18	Romain Millo-Chluski	(substituted on) 68'
FL	19	Julien Bonnaire	(substituted on) 61'
SH	20	Dimitri Yachvili	(substituted on) 72'
CE	21	Fabrice Estebanez	(substituted on) 54'
WG	22	Marc Andreu	(substituted on) 40'
Coach:
(France) Marc Lièvremont

FB	15	Kurtley Beale
RW	14	James O'Connor
OC	13	Adam Ashley-Cooper		(substituted off) 73'
IC	12	Berrick Barnes		(substituted off) 72'
LW	11	Drew Mitchell
FH	10	Quade Cooper
SH	9	Will Genia		(substituted off) 73'
N8	8	Ben McCalman		(substituted off) 36'	(substituted on) 40'	(substituted off) 64'
OF	7	David Pocock
BF	6	Rocky Elsom (c)
RL	5	Nathan Sharpe		(substituted off) 66'
LL	4	Rob Simmons
TP	3	Ben Alexander	(yellow card) 30' to 40'	(substituted off) 40'
HK	2	Stephen Moore		(substituted off) 72'
LP	1	James Slipper
Replacements:
HK	16	Tatafu Polota-Nau		(substituted on) 72'
PR	17	Benn Robinson		(substituted on) 36'
LK	18	Mark Chisholm		(substituted on) 66'
FL	19	Scott Higginbotham		(substituted on) 64'
SH	20	Luke Burgess		(substituted on) 73'
CE	21	Matt Giteau		(substituted on) 72'
WG	22	Lachlan Turner		(substituted on) 73'
Coach:
(New Zealand) Robbie Deans

Touch judges:
Wayne Barnes (England)
Carlo Damasco (Italy)
Television match official:
Hugh Watkins (Wales)

27 November 2010
15:45 CET/GMT+01 (UTC+01)

Spain	33–20	Namibia
Try: Heredia; Gibouin; Peluchon; Con: Peluchon (3/3); Pen: Peluchon (4)	Report	Try: Marais; Botha; Kitshoff; Con: Botha (1/3); Pen: S. de la Harpe (1/1)

Estadio Príncipes de España, Palma de Mallorca
Attendance: 3,500
Referee: João Mourinha (Portugal)

FB	15	Mathieu Peluchon
RW	14	Diego Álvarez
OC	13	Javier Canosa
IC	12	Bruno Angulo
LW	11	Sergi Aubanell
FH	10	Martín Heredia
SH	9	Sébastien Rouet
N8	8	Matthew Cook
OF	7	Martín Aceña (c)
BF	6	Gautier Gibouin
RL	5	Federico Negrillo
LL	4	Jesús Recuerda
TP	3	Jesús Moreno
HK	2	Beñat Auzqui
LP	1	Ion Insausti
Replacements:
PR	16	Rodrigo Martínez
HK	17	Stephan Vitalla
PR	18	Víctor Acevedo
FL	19	Alejandro Ortega
SH	20	Hernán Quirelli
CE	21	Andoni Jorajuria
FB	22	Rémi Delgado
Coach:
(France) Régis Sonnes

FB	15	Chrysander Botha
RW	14	Sergio de la Harpe
OC	13	Piet van Zyl
IC	12	Darryl de la Harpe
LW	11	Conrad Marais
FH	10	Godwin Walters
SH	9	Eugene Jantjies
N8	8	PJ van Lill
OF	7	Tinus du Plessis
BF	6	Jacques Nieuweinhuis
RL	5	Nico Esterhuyse
LL	4	Heinz Koll
TP	3	Marius Visser
HK	2	Egbertus O'Callaghan
LP	1	Johnny Redelinghuys
Replacements:
HK	16	Shaun Esterhuisen
PR	17	Jané du Toit
PR	18	Casper Viviers
LK	19	Morné Blom
FL	20	Rohan Kitshoff
SH	21	Colin de Koe
CE	22	Adriaan du Plessis
Coach:
(Namibia) Johan Diergaardt

Touch judges:
Igotz Gallastegi (Spain)
Pedro Montoya (Spain)

27 November 2010
15:00 WET/GMT+0 (UTC+0)

Portugal	20–23	Canada
Try: Aguilar; Foro; Con: Gardener (2); Pen: Gardener (2)	Report	Try: Pritchard (2); White; Con: Pritchard; Pen: Pritchard (2)

Estádio Universitário, Lisbon
Referee: Francisco Pastrana (Argentina)

FB	15	Pedro Leal
RW	14	Gonçalo Foro
OC	13	Frederico Oliveira
IC	12	Pedro Silva
LW	11	Aguilar
FH	10	Joseph Gardener
SH	9	José Pinto
N8	8	Tiago Girão
OF	7	Julien Bardy
BF	6	Vasco Uva
RL	5	Gonçalo Uva
LL	4	Rui D'Orey
TP	3	Ruben Spachuck
HK	2	João Correia (c)
LP	1	Francisco Fernandes
Replacements:
HK	16	Bernardo Duarte
PR	17	João Junior
LK	18	Eduardo Acosta
FL	19	Laurent Balangué
FH	20	Pedro Cabral
CE	21	Francisco Mira
WG	22	Bernardo Silveira
Coach:
(New Zealand) Errol Brain

FB	15	James Pritchard
RW	14	Ciaran Hearn
OC	13	Phil Mackenzie
IC	12	Nick Blevins
LW	11	Justin Mensah-Coker
FH	10	Ander Monro
SH	9	Sean White
N8	8	Aaron Carpenter
OF	7	Adam Kleeberger
BF	6	Sean-Michael Stephen
RL	5	Tyler Hotson
LL	4	Jebb Sinclair
TP	3	Andrew Tiedemann
HK	2	Pat Riordan (c)
LP	1	Tom Dolezel
Replacements:
PR	16	Jason Marshall
PR	17	Dan Pletch
LK	18	Jon Phelan
FL	19	Chauncey O'Toole
FH	20	Connor Braid
SH	21	Jamie Mackenzie
WG	22	Taylor Paris
Coach:
(New Zealand) Kieran Crowley

Touch judges:
John Erse (Portugal)
Peter Murinello (Portugal)

28 November 2010
14:30 IST/GMT+0 (UTC+0)

Ireland	29–9	Argentina
Try: Ferris 19' c D'Arcy 80' c Con: Sexton (1/1) 21'; O'Gara (1/1) 80'; Pen: Sexton (5) 13', 28', 33', 40', 65'	Report	Pen: Contepomi (3) 30', 57', 67'

Aviva Stadium, Dublin
Attendance: 30,000
Referee: Mark Lawrence (South Africa)

FB	15	Geordan Murphy
RW	14	Tommy Bowe
OC	13	Brian O'Driscoll (c)	(substituted off) 68'
IC	12	Gordon D'Arcy
LW	11	Andrew Trimble
FH	10	Johnny Sexton	(substituted off) 68'
SH	9	Peter Stringer	(substituted off) 76'
N8	8	Jamie Heaslip
OF	7	David Wallace
BF	6	Stephen Ferris	(substituted off) 60'
RL	5	Mick O'Driscoll	(substituted off) 65'
LL	4	Donncha O'Callaghan
TP	3	Tony Buckley	(substituted off) 63'
HK	2	Seán Cronin	(substituted off) 64'
LP	1	Cian Healy
Replacements:
HK	16	Damien Varley	(substituted on) 64'
PR	17	Tom Court	(substituted on) 63'
LK	18	Devin Toner	(substituted on) 65'
FL	19	Denis Leamy	(substituted on) 60'
SH	20	Eoin Reddan	(substituted on) 76'
FH	21	Ronan O'Gara	(substituted on) 68'
CE	22	Keith Earls	(substituted on) 68'
Coach:
(Ireland) Declan Kidney

FB	15	Martín Rodríguez
RW	14	Horacio Agulla
OC	13	Gonzalo Tiesi	(substituted off) 60'
IC	12	Marcelo Bosch
LW	11	Lucas González Amorosino
FH	10	Felipe Contepomi (c)
SH	9	Nicolás Vergallo	(substituted off) 68'
N8	8	Juan Martín Fernández Lobbe
OF	7	Julio Farías Cabello
BF	6	Genaro Fessia
RL	5	Patricio Albacete
LL	4	Mariano Galarza	(substituted off) 75'
TP	3	Martín Scelzo	(substituted off) 49'
HK	2	Mario Ledesma	(substituted off) 61'
LP	1	Rodrigo Roncero	(substituted off) 65'
Replacements:
HK	16	Agustín Creevy	(substituted on) 61'
PR	17	Marcos Ayerza	(substituted on) 65'
PR	18	Juan Figallo	(substituted on) 49'
LK	19	Santiago Guzmán	(substituted on) 75'
FL	20	Alvaro Galindo
SH	21	Alfredo Lalanne	(substituted on) 68'
WG	22	Lucas Borges	(substituted on) 60'
Coach:
(Argentina) Santiago Phelan

Touch judges:
Nigel Owens (Wales)
Stuart Terheege (England)
Television match official:
Daniel Gillet (France)

4 December 2010
14:30 BT/GMT+0 (UTC+0)

Barbarians	26–20	South Africa
Try: Mitchell (2) 5' m, 20' c O'Connor 15' c Geldenhuys 61' c Con: O'Connor (3/4) 17', 22' 62'	Report	Try: Ndungane 43' c Botha 69' m Maku 80' m Con: Jantjies (1/3) 44'; Pen: Jantjies 9'

Twickenham Stadium, London
Referee: Pascal Gaüzère (France)

FB	15	(Australia) James O'Connor
RW	14	(New Zealand) Joe Rokocoko		(substituted off) 64'
OC	13	(Australia) Adam Ashley-Cooper
IC	12	(New Zealand) Ma'a Nonu		(substituted off) 63'
LW	11	(Australia) Drew Mitchell
FH	10	(Australia) Matt Giteau (c)
SH	9	(Australia) Will Genia		(substituted off) 48'
N8	8	(New Zealand) Colin Bourke		(substituted off) 23'
OF	7	(Wales) Martyn Williams	22' to 29'
BF	6	(New Zealand) Rodney So'oialo		(substituted off) 48'
RL	5	(New Zealand) Chris Jack
LL	4	(South Africa) Anton van Zyl
TP	3	(New Zealand) Neemia Tialata		(substituted off) 64'
HK	2	(Australia) Stephen Moore		(substituted off) 40'
LP	1	(Italy) Salvatore Perugini
Replacements:
HK	16	(New Zealand) Keven Mealamu		(substituted on) 40'
PR	17	(Wales) John Yapp		(substituted on) 64'
LK	18	(Italy) Quintin Geldenhuys		(substituted on) 23'	(substituted off) 29'	(substituted on) 48'
FL	19	(New Zealand) Daniel Braid		(substituted on) 22'
SH	20	(New Zealand) Andy Ellis		(substituted on) 48'
FH	21	(New Zealand) Stephen Donald		(substituted on) 63'
CE	22	(Fiji) Seru Rabeni		(substituted on) 64'
Coach:
(South Africa) Nick Mallett

FB	15	Patrick Lambie
RW	14	Odwa Ndungane
OC	13	Adi Jacobs
IC	12	Andries Strauss		(substituted off) 63'
LW	11	Lwazi Mvovo
FH	10	Elton Jantjies		(substituted off) 72'
SH	9	Francois Hougaard
N8	8	Ryan Kankowski		(substituted off) 55'
OF	7	Juan Smith (c)
BF	6	Willem Alberts
RL	5	Alistair Hargreaves		(substituted off) 40'
LL	4	Bakkies Botha	29' to 38'
TP	3	CJ van der Linde
HK	2	Adriaan Strauss		(substituted off) 59'
LP	1	Coenie Oosthuizen		(substituted off) 45'
Replacements:
HK	16	Bandise Maku		(substituted on) 59'
PR	17	Tendai Mtawarira		(substituted on) 45'	(substituted off) 67'
PR	18	Werner Kruger		(substituted on) 67'
LK	19	Flip van der Merwe		(substituted on) 29'	(substituted off) 38'	(substituted on) 40'
FL	20	Keegan Daniel		(substituted on) 55'
SH	21	Charl McLeod		(substituted on) 63'
WG	22	Gio Aplon		(substituted on) 72'
Coach:
Peter de Villiers

Touch judges:
Christophe Berdos (France)
Peter Allan (Scotland)

- There are two uncapped players in the Barbarians' side: Waikato Chiefs' and New Zealand Māoris' Colin Bourke and Stormers' Anton van Zyl, and five uncapped players in South Africa's side: Cheetahs' Coenie Oosthuizen, Lions' Elton Jantjies, Sharks' Charl McLeod and Andries Strauss and Bulls' Werner Kruger.
- The match does not have Test status.

11 December 2010
14:30 CET/GMT+01 (UTC+01)

Germany	34–13	Hong Kong
	Report (in German)

Fritz-Grunebaum-Sportpark, Heidelberg
Attendance: 800
Referee: Radu Petrescu (Romania)

15 December 2010
17:00 CET/GMT+01 (UTC+01)

Norway	17–59	Hong Kong
	Report

Stavanger

18 December 2010
20:00 CET/GMT+01 (UTC+01)

Netherlands	Cancelled	Hong Kong

National Rugby Centre, Amsterdam
Referee: Dana Teagarden (United States)

- Dana Teagarden was scheduled to become the first woman to serve as referee in a senior men's international 15-man match. She is already the first (and to date only) woman to have refereed in the IRB Sevens World Series. The match was cancelled due to snow.

== See also ==
- 2010 mid-year rugby union tests
