= 2012 Blues season =

Team information
- Coach: (New Zealand) Pat Lam
- Captain: (New Zealand) Keven Mealamu
- Stadium: Eden Park, North Harbour Stadium
- Avg. attendance: 17,495
- High attendance: 32,000 (vs. Crusaders, Round 1)
- Low attendance: 10,111 (vs. Lions, Round 12)

Top scorers
- Tries: Luke Braid, Lachie Munro, Benson Stanley (3)
- Points: Gareth Anscombe (102)
← 2011	List of seasons	2013 →

The 2012 Blues season is the team's 17th season in the Super Rugby competition. The Blues' pre-season began on 4 February, and the regular season began on 24 February. The team will play 16 regular season matches, with byes in rounds 6 and 16. The Blues will play all teams within the New Zealand conference twice, and all other teams once, with the exception of the New South Wales Waratahs and Cheetahs. The team were captained by Keven Mealamu and coached by Pat Lam.

== Pre-season ==
The first of three pre-season fixtures was held on 4 February at Toll Stadium against the Hurricanes. This was followed by an away match against the Melbourne Rebels on 11 February and a "home" match on 18 February against the Highlanders at UNITEC, in Mt Albert.

=== Fixtures ===
4 Feb. 2012	Blues	36 - 22	Hurricanes	Toll Stadium, Whangārei
				Attendance: 6,000

11 Feb. 2012	Melbourne Rebels	21 - 31	Blues	AAMI Stadium, Melbourne
				Attendance: 6,000

17 Feb. 2012	Blues	29 - 22	Highlanders	UNITEC, Auckland
				Attendance: N/A

== Regular season ==
The Blues regular season began on 24 February with a home fixture against the Crusaders, and finished on 14 July, away to the Brumbies.

=== Fixtures ===
24 Feb. 2012	Blues	18 - 19	Crusaders	Eden Park, Auckland
		Report		Attendance: 32,000; Referee: Chris Pollock

2 March 2012	Chiefs	29 - 14	Blues	Waikato Stadium, Hamilton
		Report		Attendance: 12,113; Referee: Keith Brown

10 March 2012	Bulls	23 - 29	Blues	Loftus Versfeld, Pretoria
		Report		Attendance: 31,582; Referee: Steve Walsh

16 March 2012	Stormers	27 - 17	Blues	Newlands Stadium, Cape Town
		Report		Attendance: 38,041; Referee: Glen Jackson

23 March 2012	Blues	25 - 26	Hurricanes	Eden Park, Auckland
		Report		Attendance: 23,213; Referee: Steve Walsh

5 April 2012	Melbourne Rebels	32 - 23	Blues	AAMI Park, Melbourne
		Report		Attendance: 15,246; Referee: Bryce Lawrence

13 April 2012	Blues	23 - 29	Sharks	Eden Park, Auckland
		Report		Attendance: 18,000; Referee: Steve Walsh

20 April 2012	Highlanders	30 - 27	Blues	Forsyth Barr Stadium, Dunedin
		Report		Attendance: 18,417; Referee: Bryce Lawrence

27 April 2012	Blues	11 - 23	Queensland Reds	Eden Park, Auckland
		Report		Attendance: 12,111; Referee: Craig Joubert

4 May 2012	Hurricanes	35 - 19	Blues	Westpac Stadium, Wellington
		Report		Attendance: 11,624; Referee: Jaco Peyper

11 May 2012	Blues	25 - 3	Lions	Eden Park, Auckland
		Report		Attendance: 10,127; Referee: Angus Gardner

19 May 2012	Crusaders	12 - 59	Blues	Rugby League Park, Christchurch
		Report		Attendance: 17,000; Referee: Bryce Lawrence

26 May 2012	Blues	20 - 27	Highlanders	Eden Park, Auckland
		Report		Attendance: 14,111; Referee: Glen Jackson

2 June 2012	Blues	34 - 41	Chiefs	North Harbour Stadium, Auckland
		Report		Attendance: 20,200; Referee: Chris Pollock

7 July 2012	Blues	32 - 9	Western Force	Eden Park, Auckland
		Report		Attendance: 10,200; Referee: Andrew Lees

14 July 2012	Brumbies	16 - 30	Blues	Canberra Stadium, Canberra
		Report		Attendance: 14,111; Referee: Jonathon White

== Player Summary ==
Player statistics for the 2012 season are shown below:

=== Overall Summary ===
Player	Position(s)	Apps.	Tries	Cons.	Pens.	Drps.	Pts.	W.C.	Y.C.	R.C.
(New Zealand) Orene Ai'i	First five-eighth, Fullback	2	0	0	0	0	0	-	-	-
(New Zealand) Keven Mealamu (c)	Hooker	8	0	0	0	0	0	-	-	-
(New Zealand) Tony Woodcock	Prop	10	2	0	0	0	10	-	-	-
(New Zealand) Ali Williams	Lock	14	0	0	0	0	0	-	1	-
(New Zealand) Daniel Braid	Flanker	15	1	0	0	0	5	-	-	-
(New Zealand) Brad Mika	Lock, No. 8	6	0	0	0	0	0	-	-	-
(New Zealand) Jerome Kaino	Flanker, No. 8	2	0	0	0	0	0	-	-	-
(New Zealand) Rudi Wulf	Wing, Fullback	7	2	0	0	0	10	-	-	-
(New Zealand) Anthony Boric	Lock	3	0	0	0	0	0	-	-	-
(New Zealand) Isaia Toeava	Utility back	2	0	0	0	0	0	-	-	-
(New Zealand) Benson Stanley	Second five-eighth	12	3	0	0	0	15	-	-	-
(New Zealand) Tom McCartney	Hooker	16	0	0	0	0	0	-	-	-
(Samoa) Chris Lowrey	Flanker, No. 8	12	2	0	0	0	10	-	-	-
(New Zealand) Rene Ranger	Wing, Centre	10	2	0	0	0	10	1	1	-
(New Zealand) Peter Saili	Flanker, No. 8	10	0	0	0	0	0	-	-	-
(Tonga) Tevita Mailau	Prop	15	1	0	0	0	5	-	-	-
(New Zealand) Michael Hobbs	First five-eighth, Second five-eighth	14	1	1	6	0	25	-	-	-
(New Zealand) Charlie Faumuina	Prop	11	1	0	0	0	5	-	-	-
(New Zealand) Lachie Munro	Utility back	10	3	10	11	0	68	-	-	-
(New Zealand) Andrew van der Heijden	Lock	2	0	0	0	0	0	-	-	-
(New Zealand) Alby Mathewson	Half-back	16	1	0	0	0	5	-	-	-
(New Zealand) Filo Paulo	Lock	11	0	0	0	0	0	-	-	-
(New Zealand) Sherwin Stowers	Wing	8	1	0	0	0	5	-	-	-
(New Zealand) Luke Braid	Flanker	14	3	0	0	0	15	-	-	-
(New Zealand) Liaki Moli	Lock	12	1	0	0	0	5	-	-	-
(New Zealand) Pauliasi Manu	Prop	3	0	0	0	0	0	-	-	-
(New Zealand) Sean Polwart	Flanker	1	0	0	0	0	0	-	-	-
(New Zealand) Piri Weepu	Half-back, First five-eighth	15	0	3	6	0	24	-	-	-
(New Zealand) Gareth Anscombe	First five-eighth	10	2	13	21	1	102	-	-	-
(New Zealand) Ma'a Nonu	Second five-eighth	14	2	0	0	0	10	-	-	-
(New Zealand) David Raikuna	Wing	10	1	0	0	0	5	-	-	-
(Tonga) George Moala	Wing	4	0	0	0	0	0	-	-	-
(New Zealand) Angus Ta'avao	Prop	6	0	0	0	0	0	-	-	-
(New Zealand) Hadleigh Parkes	Utility back	13	2	0	0	0	10	-	-	-
(New Zealand) Ben Lam	Wing	1	0	0	0	0	0	-	-	-
(New Zealand) Daniel Pryor	Flanker	1	0	0	0	0	0	-	-	-
(New Zealand) James Parsons	Hooker	7	0	0	0	0	0	-	-	-
(New Zealand) Steve Luatua	Lock, Flanker	6	1	0	0	0	5	-	1	-
(New Zealand) Cameron Goodhue	No. 8	1	0	0	0	0	0	-	-	-
(New Zealand) Francis Saili	Wing, Centre	5	1	0	0	0	5	-	-	-
(New Zealand) Charles Piutau	Wing, Fullback	2	1	0	0	0	5	-	-	-
(New Zealand) Albert Nikoro	Wing, Fullback	1	0	0	0	0	0	-	-	-

Legend: Apps. = Appearances, Cons. = Conversions, Pens. = Penalties, Drps. = Drop Goals, Pts. = Total points, W.C. = White cards, Y.C. = Yellow cards, R.C. = Red cards

=== Top Point Scorers ===
Rank	Player	Points
1	(New Zealand) Gareth Anscombe	102
2	(New Zealand) Lachie Munro	68
3	(New Zealand) Michael Hobbs	25
4	(New Zealand) Piri Weepu	24
5=	(New Zealand) Luke Braid	15
5=	(New Zealand) Benson Stanley	15

=== Top Try Scorers ===
Rank	Player	Tries
1=	(New Zealand) Luke Braid	3
1=	(New Zealand) Lachie Munro	3
1=	(New Zealand) Benson Stanley	3
2=	Seven Players	2

== Standings ==
The final standings for the 2012 season are shown below:

New Zealand Conference
Pos	Team	Rnd	W	D	L	Bye	PF	PA	PD	TF	TA	TB	LB	Pts
1	(New Zealand) Chiefs	18	12	0	4	2	444	358	+86	47	30	5	3	64
2	(New Zealand) Crusaders	18	11	0	5	2	485	343	+142	47	34	5	4	61
3	(New Zealand) Hurricanes	18	10	0	6	2	489	429	+60	58	39	8	1	57
4	(New Zealand) Highlanders	18	9	0	7	2	359	385	−26	36	31	2	4	50
5	(New Zealand) Blues	18	4	0	12	2	359	430	−71	34	50	2	6	32

Overall Standings
Pos	Team	Rnd	W	D	L	Bye	PF	PA	PD	TF	TA	TB	LB	Pts
1	(South Africa) Stormers	18	14	0	2	2	350	254	+96	28	21	0	2	66
2	(New Zealand) Chiefs	18	12	0	4	2	444	358	+86	47	30	5	3	64
3	(Australia) Reds	18	11	0	5	2	359	347	+12	38	36	4	2	58
4	(New Zealand) Crusaders	18	11	0	5	2	485	343	+142	47	34	5	4	61
5	(South Africa) Bulls	18	10	0	6	2	472	369	+103	50	38	6	5	59
6	(South Africa) Sharks	18	10	0	6	2	436	348	+88	47	31	7	4	59
7	(Australia) Brumbies	18	10	0	6	2	404	331	+73	41	31	5	5	58
8	(New Zealand) Hurricanes	18	10	0	6	2	489	429	+60	58	39	8	1	57
9	(New Zealand) Highlanders	18	9	0	7	2	359	385	−26	36	31	2	4	50
10	(South Africa) Cheetahs	18	5	0	11	2	391	458	−67	35	47	3	7	38
11	(Australia) Waratahs	18	4	0	12	2	346	407	−61	33	43	3	8	35
12	(New Zealand) Blues	18	4	0	12	2	359	430	−71	34	50	2	6	32
13	(Australia) Rebels	18	4	0	12	2	362	520	−158	37	59	3	5	32
14	(Australia) Force	18	3	0	13	2	306	440	−134	30	49	2	5	27
15	(South Africa) Lions	18	3	0	13	2	317	460	−143	30	52	2	3	25

Legend: Pos = Position, Rnd = Round, W = Win, D = Draw, L = Loss, PF = Points For, PA = Points Against, PD = Points Difference, TB = Four-try bonus points, LB = Close loss bonus points, Pts = Competition Points

== Round by Round Result Summary ==
Round	1	2	3	4	5	6	7	8	9	10	11	12	13	14	15	16	17	18
Ground	H	A	A	A	H	-	A	H	A	H	A	H	A	H	H	-	H	A
Result	L	L	W	L	L	B	L	L	L	L	L	W	L	L	L	B	W	W
Pos. (Conf.)	3	5	5	5	5	5	5	5	5	5	5	5	5	5	5	5	5	5
Pos. (Overall)	9	13	11	14	15	13	14	14	15	15	15	14	14	14	15	14	13	12

Legend: H = Home, A = Away, W = Win, D = Draw, L = Loss, B = Bye, Pos. = Position, Conf. = Conference

== See also ==
2012 Super Rugby season
