= Salavea =

Salavea (also spelled Salave'a) is a Samoan surname. Notable people with the surname include:

- Joe Salave'a (born 1975), American football defensive lineman and coach
- Manaia Salavea (born 1986), Samoan rugby union footballer
