= 2013 Blues season =

Team information
- Coach: (New Zealand) Sir John Kirwan
- Captain: (New Zealand) Ali Williams
- Stadium: Eden Park, North Harbour Stadium
- Avg. attendance: 19,661
- High attendance: 31,014
- Low attendance: 10,811

Top scorers
- Tries: Frank Halai (5)
- Points: Chris Noakes (26)
← 2012	List of seasons

The 2013 Blues season was the team's 18th season in the Super Rugby competition. The Blues' pre-season began on 2 February, and the regular season began on 23 February. The team played 16 regular season matches, with byes in rounds 5 and 10. They did not play in rounds 1 and 17, which was only contested by Australian teams as a result of the 2013 British & Irish Lions tour to Australia. The Blues played all teams within the New Zealand conference twice, and all other teams once, with the exception of the Western Force and Southern Kings. The 2013 team was captained by Ali Williams and coached by Sir John Kirwan.

== Pre-season ==
The first of three pre-season fixtures was on 2 February against the Queensland Reds in Toowoomba. This was followed by a home match against the New South Wales Waratahs at Toll Stadium on 9 February and a final match on 15 February against the Highlanders at Queenstown Events Centre.

=== Fixtures ===
2 Feb. 2013	Queensland Reds	41 - 35	Blues	Clive Berghofer Stadium, Toowoomba
				Attendance: 7,000

9 Feb. 2013	Blues	40 - 36	New South Wales Waratahs	Toll Stadium, Whangārei
				Attendance: 6,000

15 Feb. 2013	Highlanders	29 - 31	Blues	Queenstown Events Centre, Queenstown
				Attendance: 4,000

== Regular season ==
The Blues regular season will begin on 23 February with an away fixture against the Hurricanes, and will finish on 13 July, with a home fixture against the Chiefs.

=== Fixtures ===
23 Feb. 2013	Hurricanes	20 - 34	Blues	Westpac Stadium, Wellington
		Report		Attendance: 10,662; Referee: Glen Jackson

1 March 2013	Blues	34 - 15	Crusaders	Eden Park, Auckland
		Report		Attendance: 31,014; Referee: Chris Pollock

10 March 2013	Blues	21 - 28	Bulls	Eden Park, Auckland
		Report		Attendance: 25,112; Referee: Garratt Williamson

24 March 2013	New South Wales Waratahs	30 - 27	Blues	Allianz Stadium, Sydney
		Report		Attendance: 16,429; Referee: Francisco Pastrana

30 March 2013	Chiefs	23 - 16	Blues	Baypark Stadium, Mount Maunganui
		Report		Attendance: 15,203; Referee: Jonathan Kaplan

5 April 2013	Blues	29 - 18	Highlanders	Eden Park, Auckland
		Report		Attendance: 16,489; Referee: Steve Walsh

13 April 2013	Blues	28 - 6	Hurricanes	Eden Park, Auckland
		Report		Attendance: 23,387; Referee: Jaco Peyper

26 April 2013	Queensland Reds	12 - 11	Blues	Suncorp Stadium, Brisbane
		Report		Attendance: 31,050; Referee: Craig Joubert

3 May 2013	Blues	18 - 17	Stormers	North Harbour Stadium, Auckland
		Report		Attendance: 16,111; Referee: Glen Jackson

11 May 2013	Blues	36 - 32	Melbourne Rebels	Eden Park, Auckland
		Report		Attendance: 14,700; Referee: Garratt Williamson

18 May 2013	Crusaders	23 - 3	Blues	Christchurch Stadium, Christchurch
		Report		Attendance: 17,264; Referee: Glen Jackson

25 May 2013	Blues	13 - 20	Brumbies	Eden Park, Auckland
		Report		Attendance: 10,811; Referee: Lourens van der Merwe

1 June 2013	Highlanders	38 – 28	Blues	Forsyth Barr Stadium, Dunedin
		Report		Attendance: 12,888

29 June 2013	Sharks	22 - 20	Blues	Mr Price Kings Park, Durban
		Report		Referee: Jaco Peyper

6 July 2013	Cheetahs	34 - 13	Blues	Free State Stadium, Bloemfontein
		Report		Referee: Jaco Peyper

13 July 2013	Blues	16 - 26	Chiefs	Eden Park, Auckland
		Report		Attendance: 25,118; Referee: Chris Pollock

== Tour Matches ==
On 4 April it was announced that the Blues would play a one-off match against France as a midweek fixture during their tour of New Zealand in June. The match was held on 11 June at North Harbour Stadium and was the first time a New Zealand-based Super Rugby team has played against an international side.

11 June 2013	Blues	15 - 38	France	North Harbour Stadium, Auckland
		Blues Report; NZ Herald Report		Attendance: 10,071; Referee: Jaco Peyper

== Player Summary ==
Player statistics through round five of the 2013 Super Rugby season are shown below:

=== Overall Summary ===
Cap #	Player	Position(s)	Apps.	Tries	Cons.	Pens.	Drps.	Pts.	W.C.	Y.C.	R.C.
74	(New Zealand) Keven Mealamu	Hooker	0	0	0	0	0	0	-	-	-
93	(New Zealand) Ali Williams (c)	Lock	5	0	0	0	0	0	-	-	-
137	(New Zealand) Anthony Boric	Lock	2	0	0	0	0	0	-	-	-
149	(New Zealand) Tom McCartney	Hooker	5	0	0	0	0	0	-	-	-
154	(New Zealand) Rene Ranger	Wing, Centre	5	2	0	0	0	10	-	-	-
159	(New Zealand) Peter Saili	Flanker, No. 8	4	0	0	0	0	0	-	-	-
165	(New Zealand) Charlie Faumuina	Prop	4	0	0	0	0	0	-	-	-
180	(New Zealand) Luke Braid	Flanker	5	1	0	0	0	5	-	-	-
186	(New Zealand) Piri Weepu	Half-back, First five-eighth	5	0	3	5	0	21	-	-	-
188	(New Zealand) Angus Ta'avao	Prop	5	0	0	0	0	0	-	-	-
192	(New Zealand) Francis Saili	Wing, Centre	5	0	0	0	0	0	-	-	-
193	(New Zealand) Liaki Moli	Lock	2	0	0	0	0	0	-	-	-
195	(Tonga) George Moala	Wing	4	2	0	0	0	10	-	-	-
196	(New Zealand) James Parsons	Hooker	5	1	0	0	0	5	-	-	-
197	(New Zealand) Steve Luatua	Lock, Flanker	5	1	0	0	0	5	-	-	-
199	(New Zealand) Charles Piutau	Wing, Fullback	5	3	0	0	0	15	-	-	-
200	(New Zealand) Albert Nikoro	Wing, Fullback	1	0	0	0	0	0	-	-	-
201	(New Zealand) Frank Halai	Wing	5	4	0	0	0	20	-	1	-
202	(New Zealand) Chris Noakes	First five-eighth	4	1	3	5	0	26	-	-	-
203	(New Zealand) Culum Retallick	Lock	2	0	0	0	0	0	-	-	-
204	(New Zealand) Brendon O'Connor	Flanker	5	0	0	0	0	0	-	-	-
205	(New Zealand) Bryn Hall	Halfback	1	0	1	0	0	2	-	-	-
206	(New Zealand) Quentin MacDonald	Hooker	3	0	0	0	0	0	-	-	-
207	(New Zealand) Baden Kerr	First five-eighth	3	1	1	3	0	13	-	-	-
208	(New Zealand) Jackson Willison	Second five-eighth, Centre	3	0	0	0	0	0	-	-	-
209	(New Zealand) Kane Barrett	Lock, Flanker	1	0	0	0	0	0	-	-	-
210	(New Zealand) Waisake Naholo	Wing	1	0	0	0	0	0	-	-	-
211	(New Zealand) Tim Perry	Prop	1	0	0	0	0	0	-	-	-
212	(New Zealand) Ronald Raaymakers	Lock, Flanker	1	0	0	0	0	0	-	-	-
213	(New Zealand) Jamison Gibson-Park	Halfback	3	0	0	0	0	0	-	-	-
214	(New Zealand) Marty McKenzie	Utility Back	1	0	0	0	0	0	-	-	-
N/A	(New Zealand) Malakai Fekitoa	Second five-eighth, Centre	0	0	0	0	0	0	-	-	-
N/A	(New Zealand) Ofa Tu'ungafasi	Prop	0	0	0	0	0	0	-	-	-

Legend: Apps. = Appearances, Cons. = Conversions, Pens. = Penalties, Drps. = Drop Goals, Pts. = Total points, W.C. = White cards, Y.C. = Yellow cards, R.C. = Red cards

=== Top Point Scorers ===
Rank	Player	Points
1	(New Zealand) Chris Noakes	26
2	(New Zealand) Piri Weepu	21
3	(New Zealand) Frank Halai	20
4	(New Zealand) Charles Piutau	15
5	(New Zealand) Baden Kerr	13

=== Top Try Scorers ===
Rank	Player	Tries
1	(New Zealand) Frank Halai	4
2	(New Zealand) Charles Piutau	3
3=	(New Zealand) Rene Ranger	2
3=	(Tonga) George Moala	2
5=	Five players	1

== Standings ==
The standings through the final round of the 2013 season are shown below:

New Zealand Conference
Pos	Team	Rnd	W	D	L	Bye	PF	PA	PD	TF	TA	TB	LB	Pts
1	(New Zealand) Chiefs	18	12	0	4	2	458	364	+94	50	38	8	2	66
2	(New Zealand) Crusaders	18	11	0	5	2	446	307	+139	44	31	5	3	60
3	(New Zealand) Blues	18	6	0	10	2	347	364	−17	40	36	6	6	44
4	(New Zealand) Hurricanes	18	6	0	10	2	386	457	−71	41	49	4	5	41
5	(New Zealand) Highlanders	18	3	0	13	2	374	496	−122	40	55	4	5	29

Overall Standings
Pos	Team	Rnd	W	D	L	Bye	PF	PA	PD	TF	TA	TB	LB	Pts
1	(New Zealand) Chiefs	18	12	0	4	2	458	364	+94	50	38	8	2	66
2	(South Africa) Bulls	18	12	0	4	2	448	330	+118	41	34	5	2	63
3	(Australia) Brumbies	18	10	2	4	2	430	295	+135	43	31	5	3	60
4	(New Zealand) Crusaders	18	11	0	5	2	446	307	+139	44	31	5	3	60
5	(Australia) Reds	18	10	2	4	2	321	296	+25	31	23	4	2	58
6	(South Africa) Cheetahs	18	10	0	6	2	382	358	+24	38	32	2	4	54
7	(South Africa) Stormers	18	9	0	7	2	346	292	+54	30	18	1	5	50
8	(South Africa) Sharks	18	8	0	8	2	384	305	+79	40	31	3	5	48
9	(Australia) Waratahs	18	8	0	8	2	411	371	+40	45	34	1	4	45
10	(New Zealand) Blues	18	6	0	10	2	347	364	−17	40	36	6	6	44
11	(New Zealand) Hurricanes	18	6	0	10	2	386	457	−71	41	49	4	5	41
12	(Australia) Rebels	18	5	0	11	2	382	515	−133	44	65	4	5	37
13	(Australia) Force	18	4	1	11	2	267	366	−99	26	34	0	5	31
14	(New Zealand) Highlanders	18	3	0	13	2	374	496	−122	40	55	4	5	29
15	(South Africa) Southern Kings	18	3	1	12	2	298	564	−266	27	69	2	0	24

Conference leaders, qualify to finals.
Wildcard teams, qualify to finals.

Source: sanzarrugby.com Legend: Pos = Position, Rnd = Round, W = Win, D = Draw, L = Loss, PF = Points For, PA = Points Against, PD = Points Difference, TB = Four-try bonus points, LB = Close loss bonus points, Pts = Competition Points

== Round by Round Result Summary ==
Round	1	2	3	4	5	6	7	8	9	10	11	12	13	14	15	16	17	18	19	20
Ground	-	A	H	H	-	A	A	H	H	-	A	H	H	A	H	A	-	A	A	H
Result	N/A	W	W	L	B	L	L	W	W	B	L	W	W	L	L	L	N/A	L	L	L
Pos (Conf)	N/A	1	2	2	2	3	4	3	2	1	2	2	2	3	3	3	3	3	3	3
Pos (Overall)	N/A	2	4	6	4	6	9	7	5	2	5	5	5	6	7	7	8	8	9	10

Legend: H = Home, A = Away, W = Win, D = Draw, L = Loss, B = Bye, Pos = Position, Conf = Conference

== See also ==
2013 Super Rugby season
