= Seveci Taka =

Fijian rugby player (born 1981)

- Born: Seveci Takamaiwai Sauradu; December 25, 1981 (age 44) Sigatoka, Fiji
- Height: 1.65 m (5 ft 5 in)
- Weight: 91 kg (198 lb)

Rugby union career
- Position: Halfback
Senior career
Years	Team	Apps	(Points)
- Fiji Barbarians
International career
Years	Team	Apps	(Points)
2006 - 2010	Fiji	3	(0)
- Correct as of 2010-10-12

Seveci Taka (born December 25, 1981) is a former Fijian rugby union player. He played halfback. Seveci made his international debut for Fiji against Tonga at Gosford in 2006. In that same year he played against the Junior All Blacks. Seveci was picked to represent Fiji again during the 2010 Autumn Internationals where they played against France, Wales and Italy.
