= Gary Braid =

New Zealand rugby union and rugby league footballer

Personal information
- Full name: Gary John Braid
- Born: 25 July 1960 (age 65) Tauranga, New Zealand
- Height: 193 cm (6 ft 4 in)
- Weight: 102 kg (16 st 1 lb)

Playing information

Rugby union
- Position: Lock
Club
Years	Team	Pld	T	G	FG	P
	Otumoetai Cadets
Representative
Years	Team	Pld	T	G	FG	P
1981–91	Bay of Plenty	124
1983	New Zealand	2	0	0	0	0
1986	North Harbor	16

Rugby league
- Position: Second-row
Club
Years	Team	Pld	T	G	FG	P
1992–94	Ngongotaha Chiefs
- Source: scrum.com
- Education: Otumoetai College
- Relatives: Luke Braid (son); Daniel Braid (son)

Gary John Braid (born 25 July 1960) is a New Zealand former rugby footballer who represented his country in rugby union. His two sons, Luke and Daniel, both play rugby union

== Rugby union career ==
Braid attended Otumoetai College where he played soccer before taking up rugby union and making the first XV in his last year at high school. Braid made his debut for Bay of Plenty in 1981 as a flanker before moving to lock. Braid made the All Blacks in 1983 and played in eleven games including in two test matches.

He was loaned to North Harbor in 1986. Braid was made captain of the Bay of Plenty in 1991.

== Rugby league career ==
Braid switched codes to rugby league in 1992, joining the Ngongotaha Chiefs in the Bay of Plenty Rugby League competition.

== Later years ==
Braid currently owns the "Kingslander" pub in Kingsland, New Zealand. He coached Auckland University RFC in the Auckland Premier competition in 2002-2003. In 2018/2019 season he joined Rugby Club Ljubljana (Slovenia) as a head coach of their senior side.
