= Albert Vulivuli =

Fiji international rugby union player

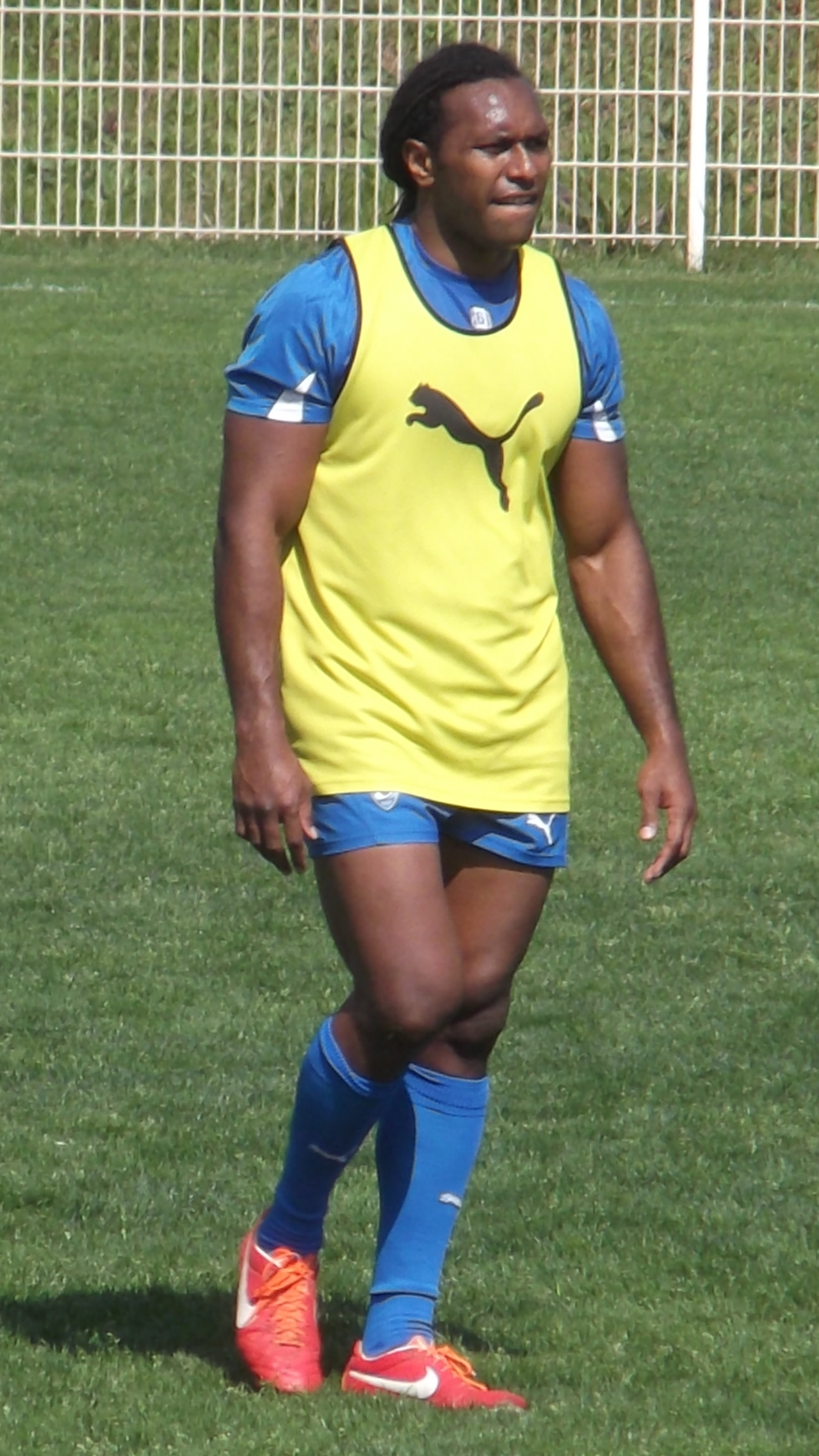
- Born: Albert James Vulivuli; 26 May 1985 (age 41) Fiji
- Height: 1.90 m (6 ft 3 in)
- Weight: 104 kg (16 st 5 lb)

Rugby union career
- Position(s): Centre, Wing
Senior career
Years	Team	Apps	(Points)
2009	Reds		
2009–10	Bourgoin	21	(20)
2010–13	Racing 92	26	(15)
2013–15	La Rochelle	37	(20)
2015–2015	Montpellier	5	(0)
2015–2016	Clermont Auvergne	14	(10)
2016-	Racing 92	22	(5)
Super Rugby
Years	Team	Apps	(Points)
2009	Queensland Reds		
International career
Years	Team	Apps	(Points)
2010–	Fiji	16	(10)
- Correct as of 24 June 2017

Albert James Vulivuli (born 26 May 1985 in Savusavu) is a Fijian rugby union player. He plays as a centre or wing. His older brother, Thomas plays football for Fiji whereas his younger sister, Finau is one of Fiji's female football referees.

He attended Hamilton Boys High School in Waikato, New Zealand in 2004. He was part of the Waikato Under 20 team and the Waikato B team from 2005 to 2008 before moving across to Australia. He started playing professional rugby in Australia playing for the Queensland Reds in the 2009 Super 14 season. He moved to France shortly after the season ended to join his new Top 14 club, CS Bourgoin-Jallieu.

He made his top 14 debut against Racing Métro 92 in September 2009 on the wing. He played 16 games for them, all on the wing. After the 2009–10 Top 14 season ended, he joined Racing Métro 92, the same club he made his debut against and played his first game in August 2010 against Brive at inside centre in the 2010–11 Top 14 season. He made his Heineken Cup debut at outside centre against Leinster where he scored a try.

In 2013, Vulivuli signed a deal to join Top 14 club La Rochelle.

He currently (2015) plays for Montpellier in the Top 14.

After utility back, Kameli Ratuvou pulled out of Fiji's team for the 2010 end of year rugby tests, Vulivuli was called in as a replacement.

He is best known for his strong runs and ferocious tackles in the Top 14 competition.

== Honours ==
(France) Racing 92

- Top 14: 2015–16
