= Anton van Zyl =

South African rugby union player

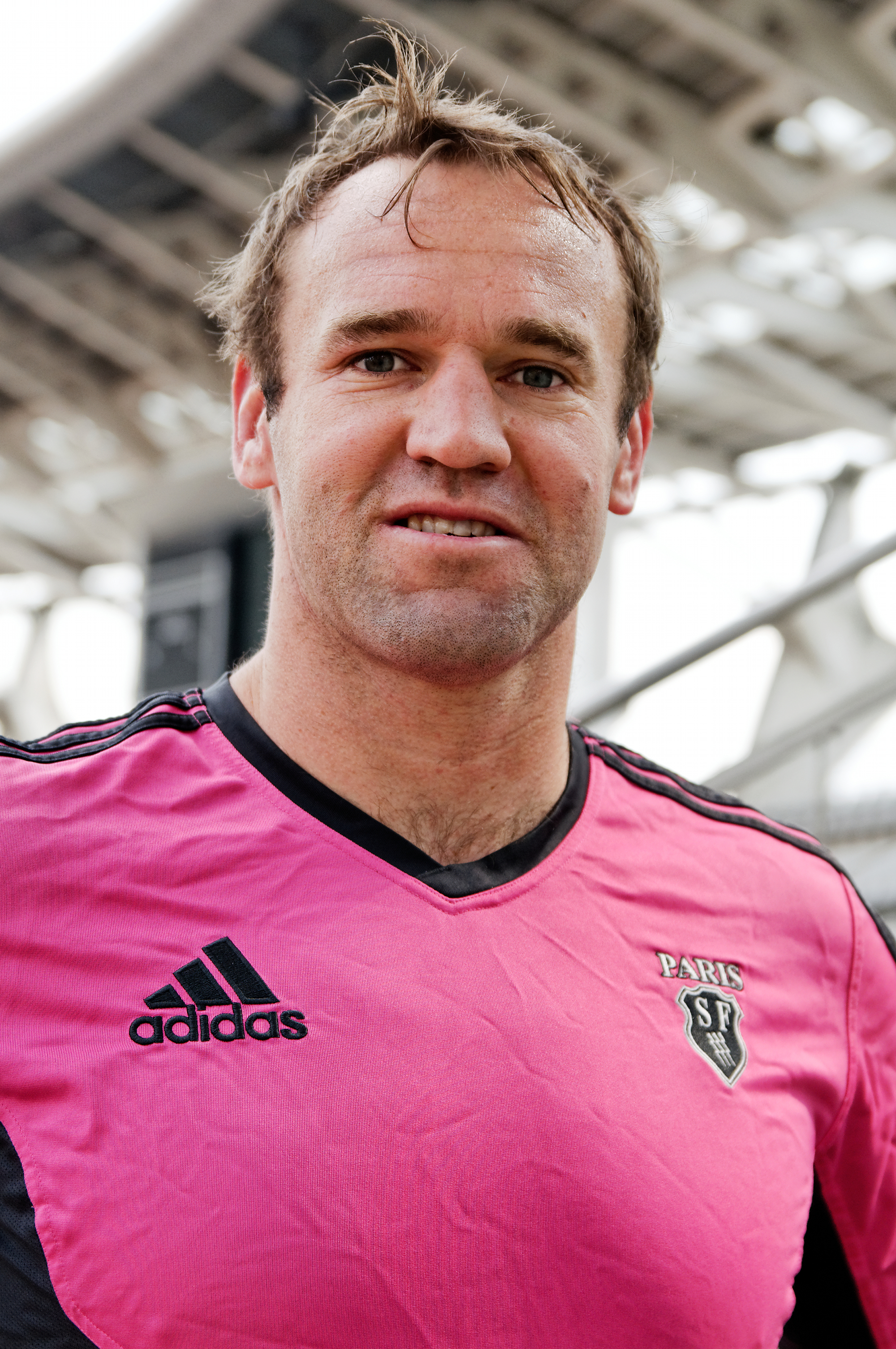
- Born: Anton van Zyl; 23 February 1980 (age 46) Cape Town, South Africa
- Height: 1.95 m (6 ft 5 in)
- Weight: 113 kg (17 st 11 lb; 249 lb)
- School: Rondebosch Boys' High School
- University: University of Stellenbosch; University of Oxford
- Notable relative: Chris van Zyl (brother)

Rugby union career
- Position: Lock
Senior career
Years	Team	Apps	(Points)
2011–2014	Stade Français	60	(10)
Provincial / State sides
Years	Team	Apps	(Points)
2002–2011, 2014–present	Western Province	42	(10)
- Correct as of 25 October 2014
Super Rugby
Years	Team	Apps	(Points)
2010–2011	Stormers	22	(5)
- Correct as of 11 February 2011
International career
Years	Team	Apps	(Points)
2010 & 2012	Barbarians	3	
2013	Bermuda Select XV		

Anton van Zyl (born 23 February 1980) is a South African rugby union footballer. He currently plays for Western Province in the Currie Cup. His regular playing position is Lock. He won the Hector Klette floating trophy for participation in school life in 1993 at Rondebosch boys High School.
