= António Aguilar (rugby union) =

Portuguese rugby union player (born 1978)

- Born: António Maria Maurício de Aguilar; 6 July 1978 (age 48) Lisbon
- Height: 1.92 m (6 ft 4 in)
- Weight: 104 kg (229 lb)

Rugby union career
- Position(s): Fullback, Wing
International career
Years	Team	Apps	(Points)
1999–2014	Portugal	84	(120)

António Maria Maurício de Aguilar (born 6 July 1978 in Lisbon) is a former Portuguese rugby union player. He played as a wing.

== Career ==
Aguilar played in Grupo Desportivo Direito. After being National Champion twice in his first two senior seasons, he moved to Mont-de-Marsan, a second division French rugby club. He played in France for 2 years and then went back to Direito. He plays for Tarbes Pyrénées Rugby since 2007/08.

Aguilar had 84 caps for Portugal, from 1999 to 2014, scoring 24 tries, 120 points on aggregate. He was European Sevens Champion and European Champion of the Six Nations B, in 2004. He was a member of the Portuguese squad at the 2007 Rugby World Cup finals, playing three games and remaining scoreless.
