= Juan Severino Somoza =

Portugal international rugby union player

- Born: Juan Severino Somoza; 16 September 1981 (age 45) Argentina
- Height: 6 ft 1 in (1.85 m)
- Weight: 246 lb (112 kg)

Rugby union career
- Position(s): Number 8, Lock, Flanker
- Current team: Deportiva Francesa
International career
Years	Team	Apps	(Points)
2006–2013	Portugal	50	(5)

Juan Severino Somoza (born 16 September 1981) is an Argentine-born Portuguese rugby union footballer. He plays as a lock or as a flanker.

He was a member of Agronomia team, winning the title of National Champion in 2006/2007. He played also for the Italian semi-professional team of Rugby Reggio.

He decided to represent Portugal, and was selected for the 2007 Rugby World Cup finals squad. He played a single game with Scotland. He head-butted a Scottish player, being suspended for four weeks after the incident.

Severino had 50 caps for the "Lobos", from 2006 to 2013, with a try scored, five points in aggregate.
