= Richard Muagututia =

- Born: 7 January 1988 (age 38)
- Height: 1.88 m (6 ft 2 in)
- Weight: 108 kg (17 st 0 lb)

Rugby union career
International career
Years	Team	Apps	(Points)
- Samoa

Richard Muagututia (born 7 January 1988) is a Samoan rugby union player who plays as a number eight. He has one cap for Samoa, making his début against Japan.

In September 2011 he joined the Worcester Warriors. In November 2011 he left the club, after it was revealed that he had joined on a three-month visa, and had to leave the UK to normalise his immigration status. During 2012, it was announced that he would leave Worcester Warriors after one season. Muagututia had not played as much as he wanted, when he suffered a broken cheek bone in the middle of the season.

In August 2013 he joined Spanish club Ordizia. In September 2015 he joined French club Auch.
