= Daniel Braid =

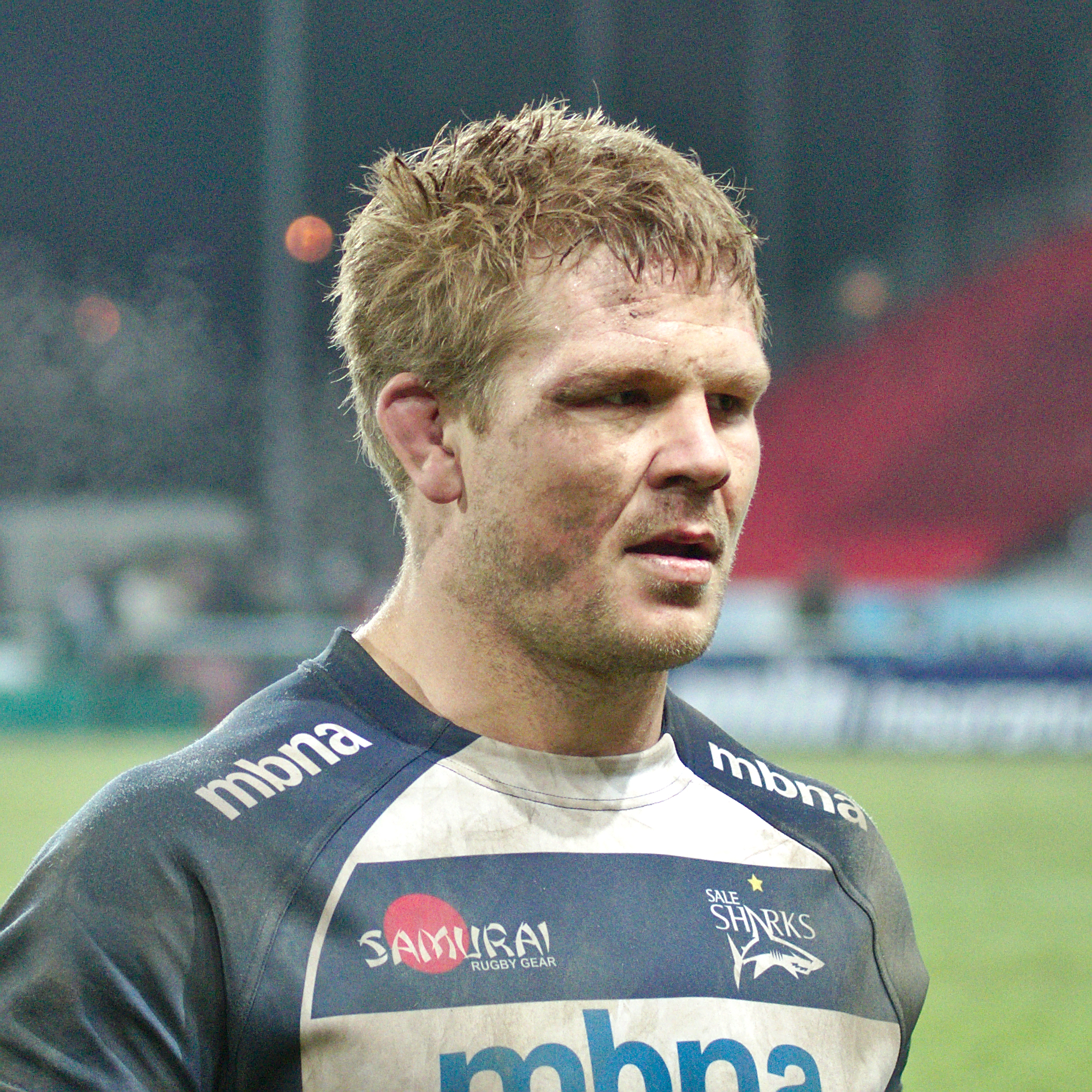
- Born: Daniel Joshua Braid; 23 February 1981 (age 45) Tauranga, New Zealand
- Height: 1.86 m (6 ft 1 in)
- Weight: 94 kg (14 st 11 lb)
- School: Tauranga Boys' College; King's College, Auckland
- University: University of Auckland
- Notable relative(s): Luke Braid (brother); Gary Braid (father)

Rugby union career
- Position: Flanker
Senior career
Years	Team	Apps	(Points)
2012–2016	Sale Sharks	67	(80)
- Correct as of 29 August 2016
Provincial / State sides
Years	Team	Apps	(Points)
2001–2008	Auckland	100	(65)
2010–2012	Auckland		
- Correct as of 2 June 2012
Super Rugby
Years	Team	Apps	(Points)
2003–2008	Blues	59	(30)
2009–2010	Reds	19	(10)
2011–2012	Blues	22	(10)
- Correct as of 3 June 2013
International career
Years	Team	Apps	(Points)
2002–2010	New Zealand	6	(5)
- Correct as of 10 April 2012

Daniel John Braid (born 23 February 1981) is a former rugby union player from New Zealand who captained Sale Sharks in the English Premiership. He played at open-side flanker. Previously, he played for the Blues in Super Rugby. He also won six full caps for the All Blacks between 2002 and 2010.

== Career ==
Braid made his debut for Auckland in 2001 and for the Blues in 2003. He won ITM Cups for Auckland in 2002, 2003, 2005 and 2007. For the Blues he won the 2003 Super 12.

He played three Tests for the All Blacks in 2002 and 2003, and for the Junior All Blacks in the 2007 Pacific Nations Cup. He was named New Zealand 'Player of the Year' in 2007. In July 2008, he played another international against Australia and in November 2010 made two more international appearances.

Braid left New Zealand in 2009, and broke new ground when he signed with the Queensland Reds. In April he signed with the Scarlets in Wales, but ruptured his Achilles tendon and so the agreement was abandoned. In 2009 he signed on for an extra year with the Reds.

In 2011 Braid returned to the Blues but was released at the end of 2012 by incoming coach Sir John Kirwan.

At the conclusion of the 2012 ITM Cup, Braid signed a short-term contract with English premiership team Sale Sharks. Following the end of the 2012–13 season Dan signed a full-time contract and has since been given the captaincy for the 2013–14 season and subsequently the 2014–15 season.

== Personal life ==
Braid's younger brother Luke Braid is also a professional rugby player with the Blues. Their father Gary Braid played for the All Blacks in 1983.

Awards
Preceded by Carl Hayman	Tom French Memorial; Māori rugby union player of the year 2007	Succeeded by Piri Weepu
