= Manaia Salavea =

Samoan rugby union player

Manaia Salavea (born 26 March 1986) is a Samoan rugby union rugbyman. He currently plays for French team Narbonne and the Samoan rugby union, and usually plays as a flanker. He was part of the Samoan team at the 2011 Rugby World Cup where he played in two matches, he made his international debut in 2010.
