= Luke Braid =

- Born: Luke Gary Braid; 5 October 1988 (age 38) Tauranga, Bay of Plenty, New Zealand
- Height: 1.85 m (6 ft 1 in)
- Weight: 101 kg (15 st 13 lb)
- School: Tauranga Boys' College, Cranleigh School
- Notable relative(s): Daniel Braid (brother); Gary Braid (father)

Rugby union career
- Position: Flanker
- Current team: Union Bordeaux Begles
Senior career
| Years | Team | Apps | (Points) |
| 2015–2019 | Bordeaux | 48 | (15) |
- Correct as of 3 December 2019
Provincial / State sides
| Years | Team | Apps | (Points) |
| 2008–12 | Bay of Plenty | 54 | (40) |
| 2013–15 | Auckland | 7 | (10) |
- Correct as of 3 November 2014
Super Rugby
| Years | Team | Apps | (Points) |
| 2009–10 | Chiefs | 10 | (0) |
| 2011–15 | Blues | 69 | (45) |
- Correct as of 12 June 2015
International career
| Years | Team | Apps | (Points) |
| 2008 | New Zealand under-20 | 4 | (5) |
| 2013–15 | Māori All Blacks | 1 | (0) |
- Correct as of 3 November 2013

Luke Gary Braid (born 5 October 1988) is a rugby union footballer who plays for the Blues in Super Rugby and Auckland in the ITM Cup. He plays as a loose forward. Braid has also played for three national rugby union teams, the New Zealand Schoolboys, the New Zealand Under 19's, and the New Zealand Under 20s Braid is the son of former player Gary Braid and the younger brother of fellow Blues player Daniel Braid.

Braid made his professional debut with Steve Honey and Jason Fly at Tauranga boys college in 2008. In 2010, he made his Chiefs debut against the Lions, with the Chiefs winning 65 – 72 away from home. The match set several new records for Super Rugby including the highest aggregate score in a single match (137 points), highest score by an away side (72) and the most tries scored in a Super Rugby match (18). Braid appeared 8 times during the 2010 season as the Chiefs finished in 10th place.

In 2011, he signed with the Blues, with whom he appeared in the 2011 Super Rugby semi-finals. In 2012, he captained the side in a number of matches whilst regular captain Keven Mealamu was injured.

In November 2014, it was Braid revealed that he would join French Top 14 side Bordeaux at the conclusion of the 2015 Super Rugby season.
