= Fiji national rugby union team =

National rugby union team

Fiji
- Nickname: Flying Fijians
- Emblem: Palm tree
- Union: Fiji Rugby Union
- Head coach: Jake White
- Captain: Tevita Ikanivere
- Most caps: Nicky Little (71)
- Top scorer: Nicky Little (670)
- Top try scorer: Vereniki Goneva (22), Nemani Nadolo (22)
- Home stadium: ANZ National Stadium
First colours	Second colours

World Rugby ranking
- Current: 10 (as of 28 September 2026)
- Highest: 7 (2023)
- Lowest: 16 (2011, 2012)

First international
- Western Samoa 0–6 Fiji (Apia, Samoa; 18 August 1924)

Biggest win
- Fiji 124–4 Niue (Apia, Samoa; 10 September 1983)

Biggest defeat
- New Zealand 91–0 Fiji (Auckland, New Zealand; 10 June 2005)

World Cup
- Appearances: 9 (first in 1987)
- Best result: Quarterfinals (1987, 2007, 2023)
Medal record
Pacific Games
Gold medal – first place	1963 Suva
Gold medal – first place	1969 Port Moresby
Gold medal – first place	1983 Apia
Silver medal – second place	1979 Suva
- Website: www.fijirugby.com

The Fiji national rugby union team represents Fiji in men's international rugby union. Fiji competed in the Pacific Tri-Nations and now competes in its successor tournament Pacific Nations Cup. Fiji also regularly plays test matches during the June and November test windows. They have beaten the major rugby playing sides of Wales, Scotland, Australia, France, Italy, Argentina and England. The only major sides Fiji are yet to beat are New Zealand, South Africa and Ireland.

The "Flying Fijians" as they are nicknamed compete every four years at the Rugby World Cup. Their best performances were the 1987, 2007 and 2023 tournaments when they defeated Argentina, Wales and Australia respectively to reach the quarterfinals.

Fiji is one of the few countries where rugby union is the main sport. There are approximately 80,000 registered players from a total population of around 950,000. One obstacle for Fiji is simply getting their rugby players to play for the national team, as many have contracts in Europe or with Super Rugby teams where the money is far more rewarding. The repatriated salaries of its overseas stars have become an important part of some local economies.

The cibi (pronounced [ˈðimbi]) war dance is performed by the Fiji rugby team before each Test match. It has been used on the rugby field since 1939, though its origins date back to the country's warring times with its Pacific neighbours.

== History ==
=== Early years ===
Rugby was first played in Fiji by European and Fijian soldiers of the Native Constabulary at Ba, on Viti Levu Island in 1884. In 1913 a Union was founded for the European settlers.

In December 1913, the All Blacks, who had been touring so very successfully in California, were on their way back to New Zealand. The Fiji RFU arranged a game with them at Albert Park, the first representative match to be played in the colony. The Fiji team were Europeans. The All Blacks won 67–3; Fiji's points came from a try scored by their captain and coach, PJ Sheehan. By 1914 a 'native competition' was started and in 1915 a Fiji Native Union was begun and became affiliated to the Fiji RFU.

=== Inter-war period ===
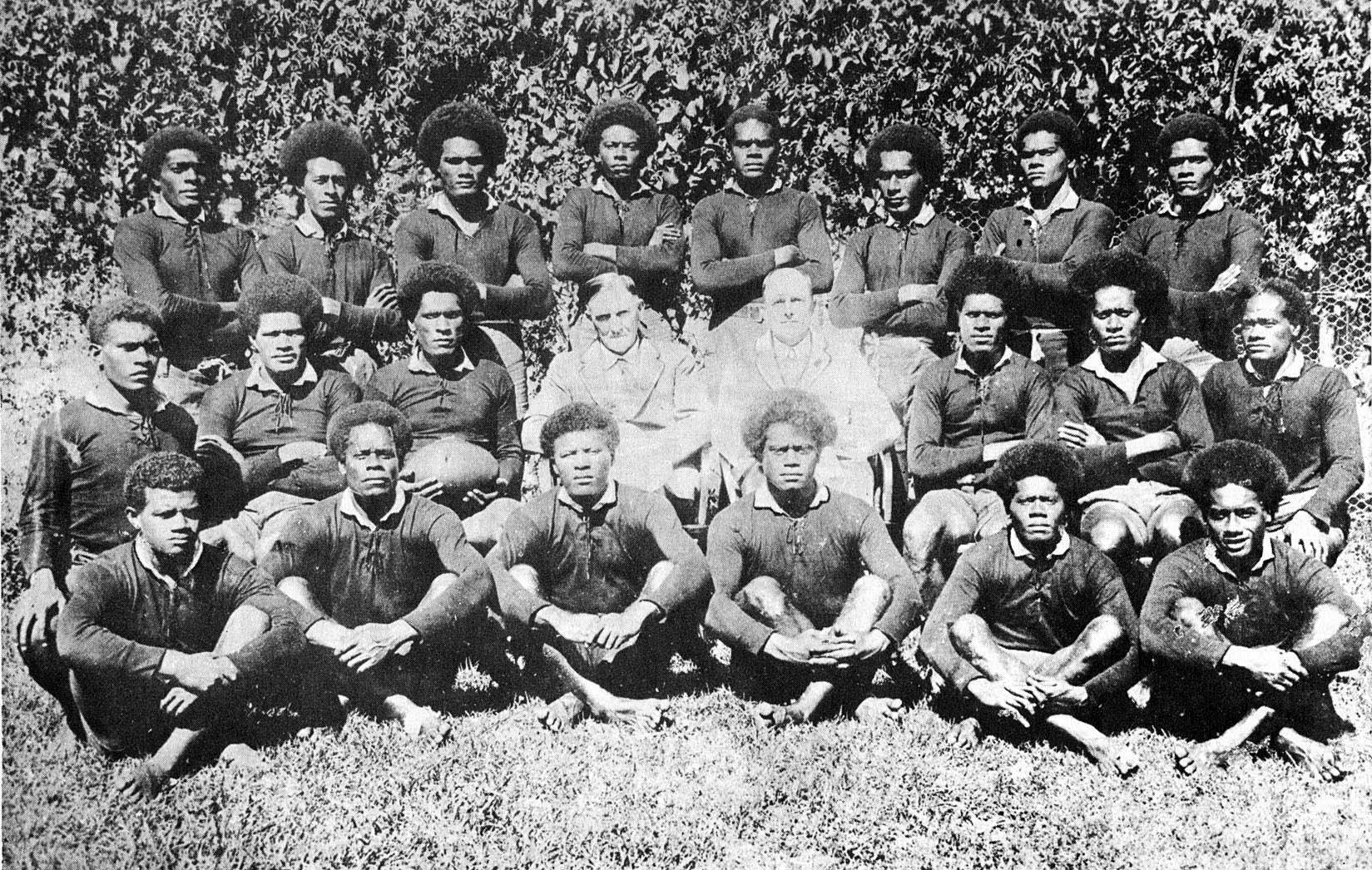
Fiji team in 1924

Fiji played their first international against Western Samoa in Apia, Samoa on 18 August 1924. Fiji's 20-man squad came exclusively from the five registered native clubs of the time. The match was played at 7 am to allow the Samoans time to get to work afterwards and the Fijians to catch their sailing; it was played on a quality pitch, despite persistent but unfounded stories there was a large tree on the halfway line. Fiji wore black and won 6–0 despite playing barefoot. The return match was won 9–3 by Samoa to draw the series. The first-ever Fiji test team continued their overseas adventure between tests with a nine-match tour of Tonga. Though Fiji lost the first test played in Nukuʻalofa 9–6, they were not to lose again, taking the second test 14–3 then drawing the decider 0–0. They won all six of the matches against non-test opposition.

Auckland University College were the first overseas side to visit Fiji in 1926, The Kiwi students played the Fiji Europeans and finished the three-match series with a win, loss and draw. Tonga also visited Fiji that year and for the first time Fiji played in their present strip of white jersey, palm tree badge and black shorts. The three match series finished level with Tonga winning the first test 9–6; Fiji winning the second 14–3 and the final game a 0–0 draw.

During the 1927 season, a General Meeting was called for the purpose of arranging a return visit to New Zealand at the invitation of Auckland University. Some 30 players expressed their willingness to make the trip, but after all arrangements had been made, there were insufficient players available so management cancelled the trip, much to the regret of Auckland.

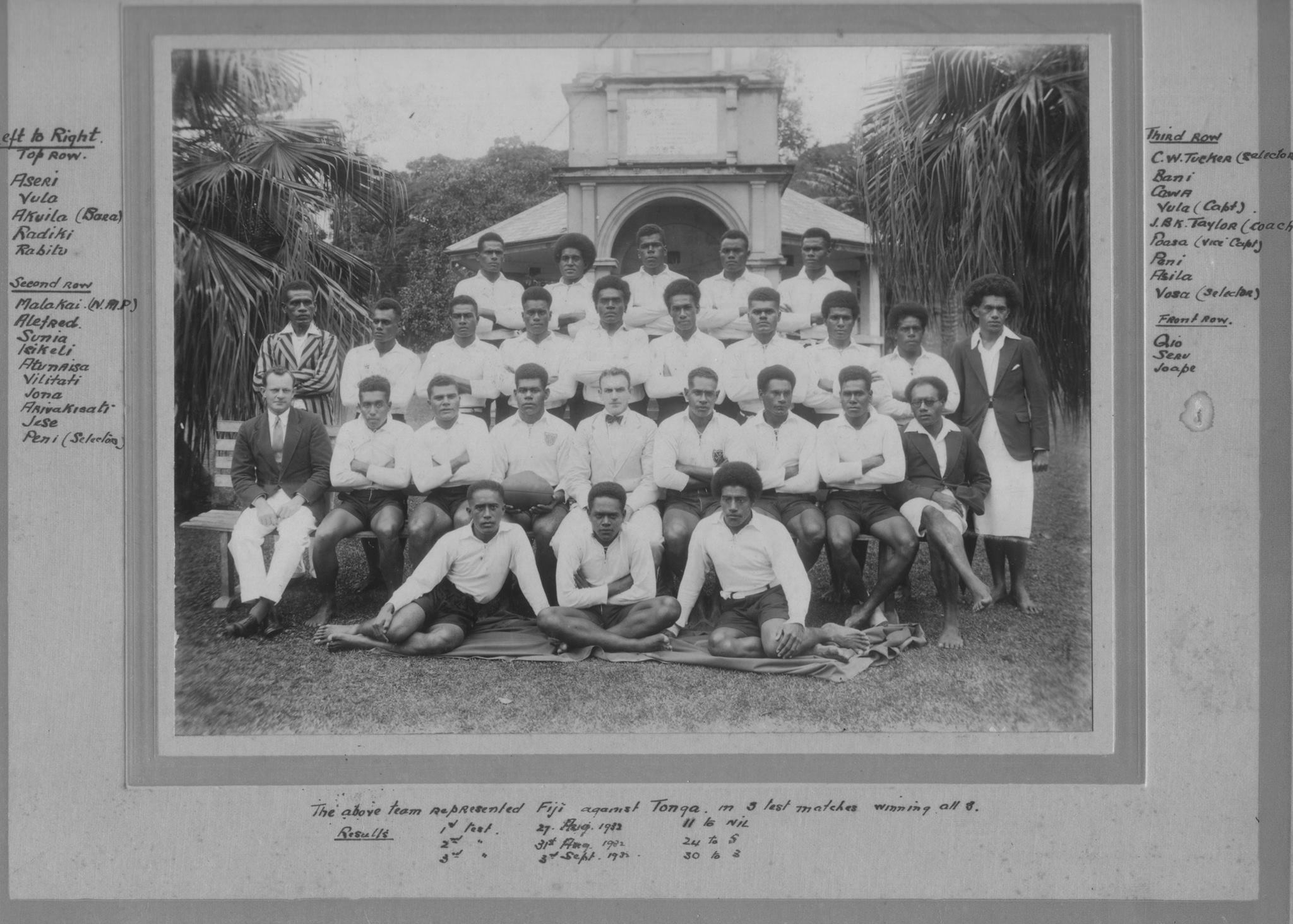
Fiji team in 1932

Between 1924 and 1938 Fiji and Tonga played three test series every alternate year. During this period this was the only representative rugby union that Fiji played. Matches between the two Pacific nations were hard fought; many have claimed that the ancient feuding wars between the Islanders were transplanted onto the rugby field. Troubles during the third Test of Fiji's 1928 tour to Tonga forced the game to be abandoned with Tonga losing 11–8.

The first New Zealand Māori team to visit Fiji came in 1938. Fijians played in boots for the first time but there was still a tendency to take off boots during the match and throw them to the touch-line. On the five-match tour, the Māori beat Fiji 2nd XV and Fiji Europeans before playing a three match series. The first test ended in a 3–3 draw, the second an 11–5 win for the Fijians and the Māori won the final test 6–3 to square the series.

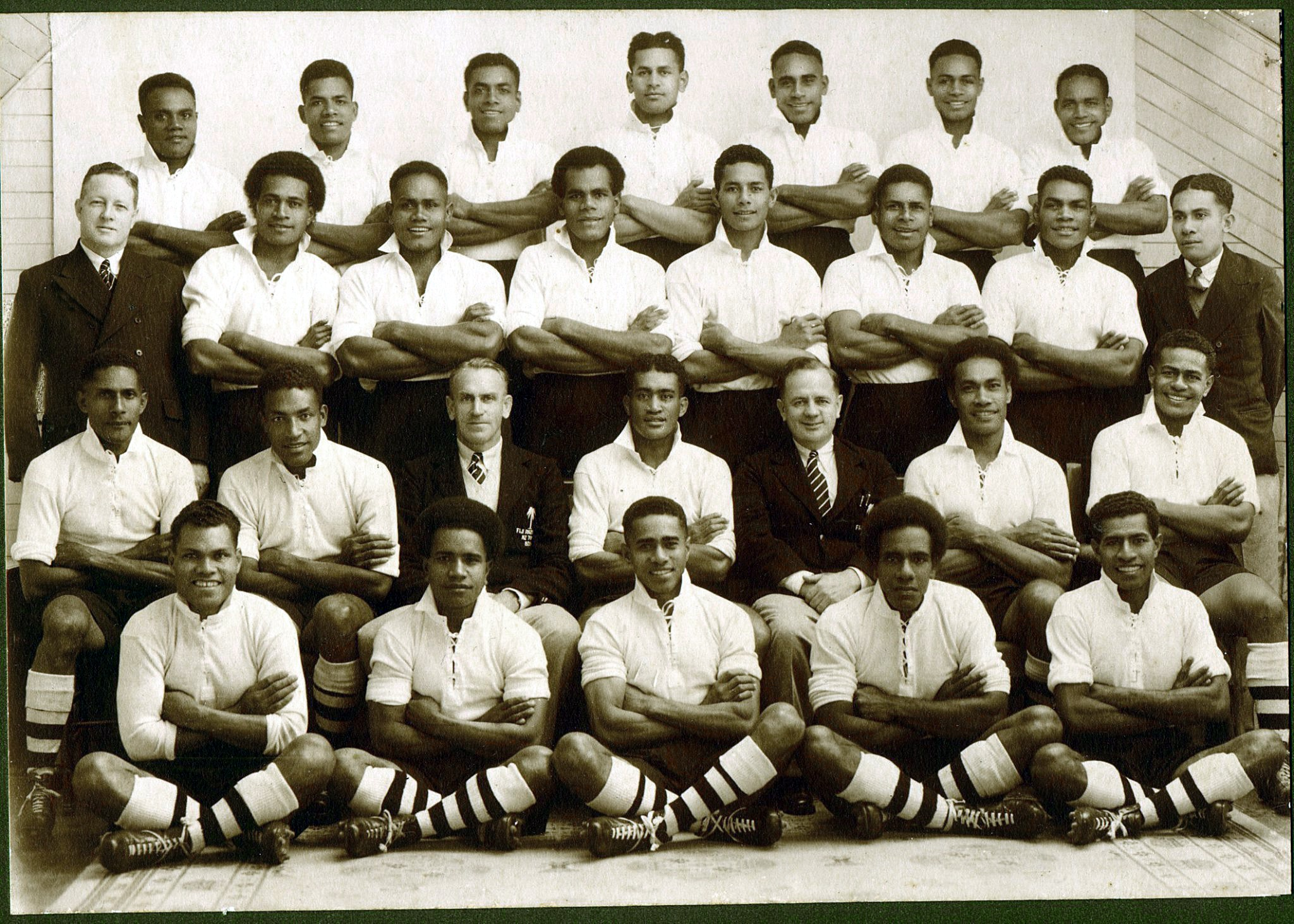
Fiji team in 1939

In 1939 Fiji toured New Zealand for the first time. Fiji's captain for that tour, Ratu Sir George Cakobau, decided that his side should have a war dance to rival the haka. He approached Ratu Bola, the high chief of the warrior clan of Navusaradave in Bau, who taught them the cibi which has been Fiji's pre-match ritual ever since. With many players still preferring to play barefoot, the Fijians played with a care-free spirit and created history by becoming the first team to go through a full tour of New Zealand unbeaten, winning seven and drawing one, a record that stands to this day. They played and beat the Māori again 14–4.

=== Post-war era ===
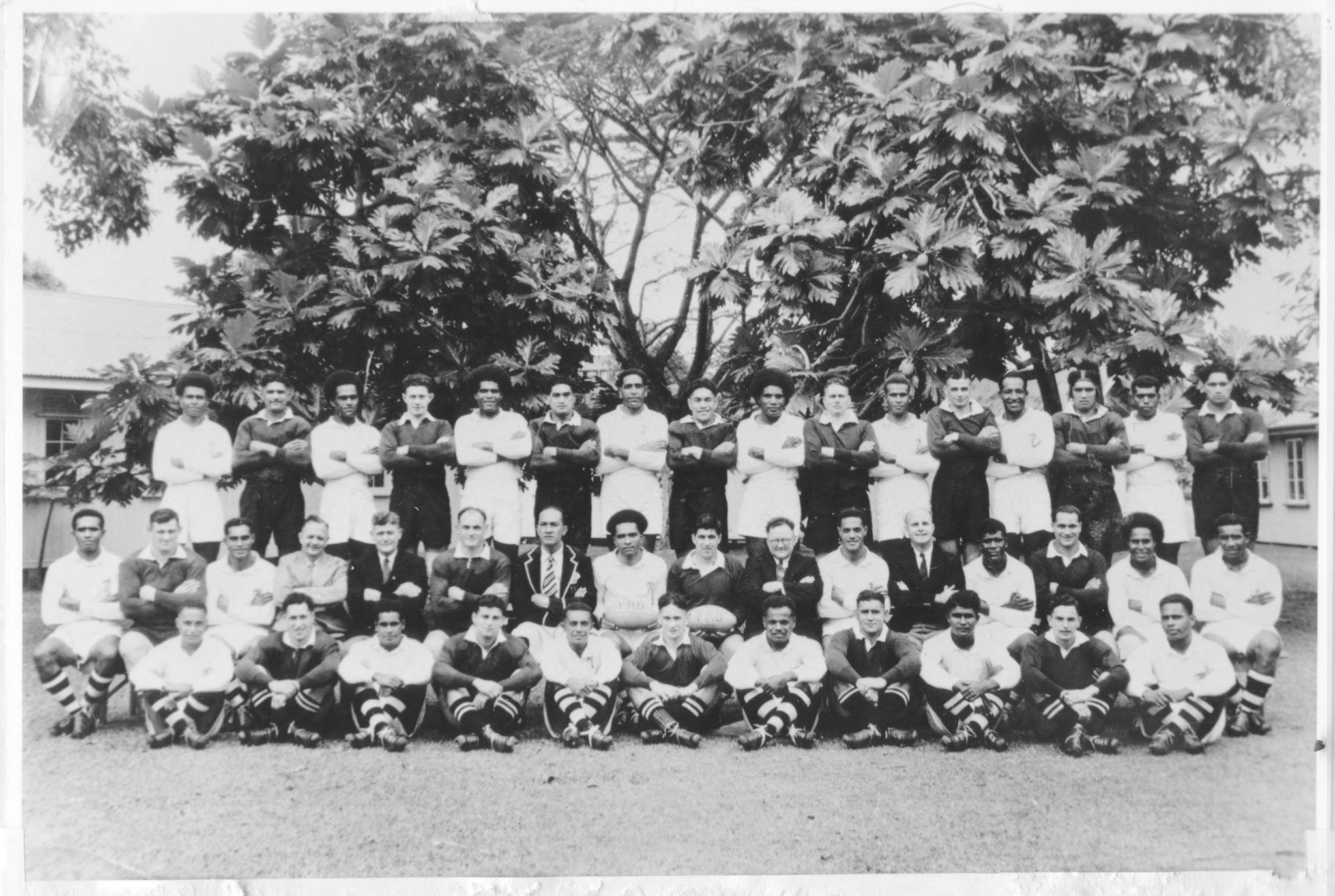
Fiji team in 1948

Fiji successfully toured New Zealand again in 1951. They beat the New Zealand Māori 21–14. Fiji's first tour of Australia helped the Australian Rugby Union recover from the brink of bankruptcy in 1952. The Test series was drawn 1–1 in front of record crowds. Australia won the first test 15–9 but the Fijians took the second with a 17–15 win.

A second tour of Australia took place in 1954 and again drew record crowds. Again Australia won the first test but only by 22–19. The test series was drawn 1–1 after Fiji won the second test 18–16. The same year Fiji played host to Western Samoa. Fiji toured New Zealand again in 1957 and beat the Māori 36–13 in Dunedin and 17–8 in Wellington, then defeated a strong Auckland team 38–17.

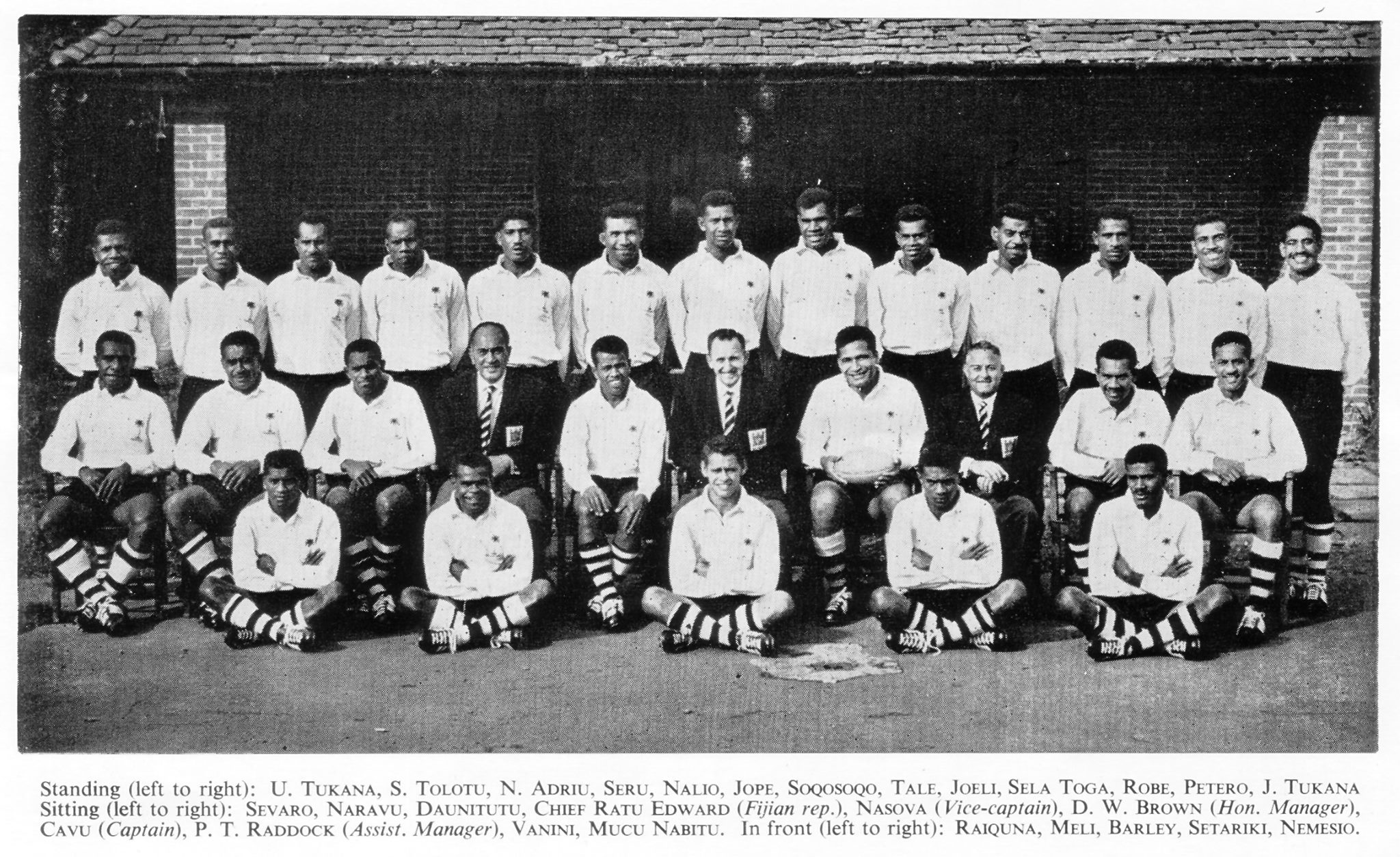
Fiji team in 1964

In 1964 Fiji toured Europe for the first time, they played five memorable games in Wales, culminating in a classic encounter in Cardiff that was talked about for years. Wales won 28–22 but conceded six tries for just the second time in their history. In 1970 a rampant Fijian side destroyed the Barbarians 29–9 at Gosforth. A last-minute try saw New Zealand safely through 14–13 over Fiji in Suva in 1974.

In August 1977 the British Lions made a stopover in Fiji on the way home from their tour of New Zealand. Fiji beat them 25–21 at Buckhurst Park, Suva. In 1982 Fiji beat Vancouver XV to begin a 15-match winning streak through to 1984.

=== Modern era ===
Fiji played their first full test against Wales in Cardiff in 1985, the home pack dominating in a 40–3 win with two tries to Phil Davies. Fiji were also heavily beaten by Llanelli and Cardiff, but lost by just one point in their test with Ireland.

Wales visited Suva the following year, where captain Dai Pickering's summer tour was to a premature end when he suffered concussion. Richard Moriarty took over and saw his side's 13–0 lead cut to a single point before Wales pulled away for a 15–22 win.

In 1987 Fiji made the quarter-final of the Rugby World Cup and seemed close to beating France according to the match referee, at one point even leading 4–3, but were eventually ground down by the French 31–16.

In 1991 Rugby World Cup Fiji lost all three of its matches and finished bottom of its pool. Wales' third test win over Fiji came in Suva in 1994. The tourists fielded a weakened line-up to allow all their squad a game, but they were good enough to run out 23–8 victors.

Fiji had a troubled tour of Wales and Ireland in 1995, losing six of nine games with defeat to Neath, Cardiff and Pontypridd. However, they managed to run Wales close at the Arms Park, losing only 15–19. They failed to qualify for the 1995 World Cup having lost to Tonga and Western Samoa.

Fiji rebuilt ahead of the 1999 World Cup, new coach Brad Johnstone instilling discipline and determination into their set-piece play. They made a winning start by beating Canada and Namibia and again seemed about to beat France in Toulouse when things went wrong. A controversial refereeing performance from Paddy O'Brien was felt to have cost them a win over France, Fiji losing 28–19. They did make the quarter-final play-off but lost 45–24 to the combative games; England at Twickenham. Soon after the tournament Johnstone departed for Italy.

In 2001 Fiji were crowned Pacific Rim champions, defeating Samoa 28–17 in the final in Tokyo. Fiji's played Wales again at the Millennium Stadium in November 2002. Two tries and 21 points from the boot of Stephen Jones helped the home side to a comfortable 58–14 win.

Fiji began their 2003 Rugby World Cup qualifying campaign in June 2002 when the three leading Pacific Island nations faced each other in a round robin in the second round of the Oceania zone qualifiers. The Fijians started with defeats of Samoa and Tonga, but their loss to Samoa on home soil meant that they had to beat Tonga by more than 20 points to finish top of the pool. This they duly did with a 47–20 win in Nadi. At the World Cup they beat Japan 41–13 and narrowly survived a scare against the US Eagles winning 19–18. However a 20–22 loss against Scotland and an 18–61 beating by France saw them finish third in their pool and fail to qualify for the knock-out stage.

Results since have been mixed for Fiji. Although they have traditionally been the strongest of the Pacific Nations, they were beaten 29–27 by New Zealand Maori in 2004 and went down 91–0 by the All Blacks. In July 2005, five Fiji internationals were banned from playing international rugby for the rest of the year following a drunken brawl in Japan after a Pacific Five Nations match.

Their 2007 season started off as one of Fiji's worst seasons. They had a very inexperienced team and lost to both pacific rivals Tonga and Samoa, and suffered heavy defeats to Australia and the Junior All Blacks. The only win for Fiji at the 2007 "Pacific 6 Nations" was against Japan, however they did manage an unexpected 14–14 draw against Australia A. With most of Fiji's more experienced players back in the team Fiji slowly improved in the 2007 world cup to qualify for the quarter finals for the first time in 20 years.

=== 2007 Rugby World Cup ===
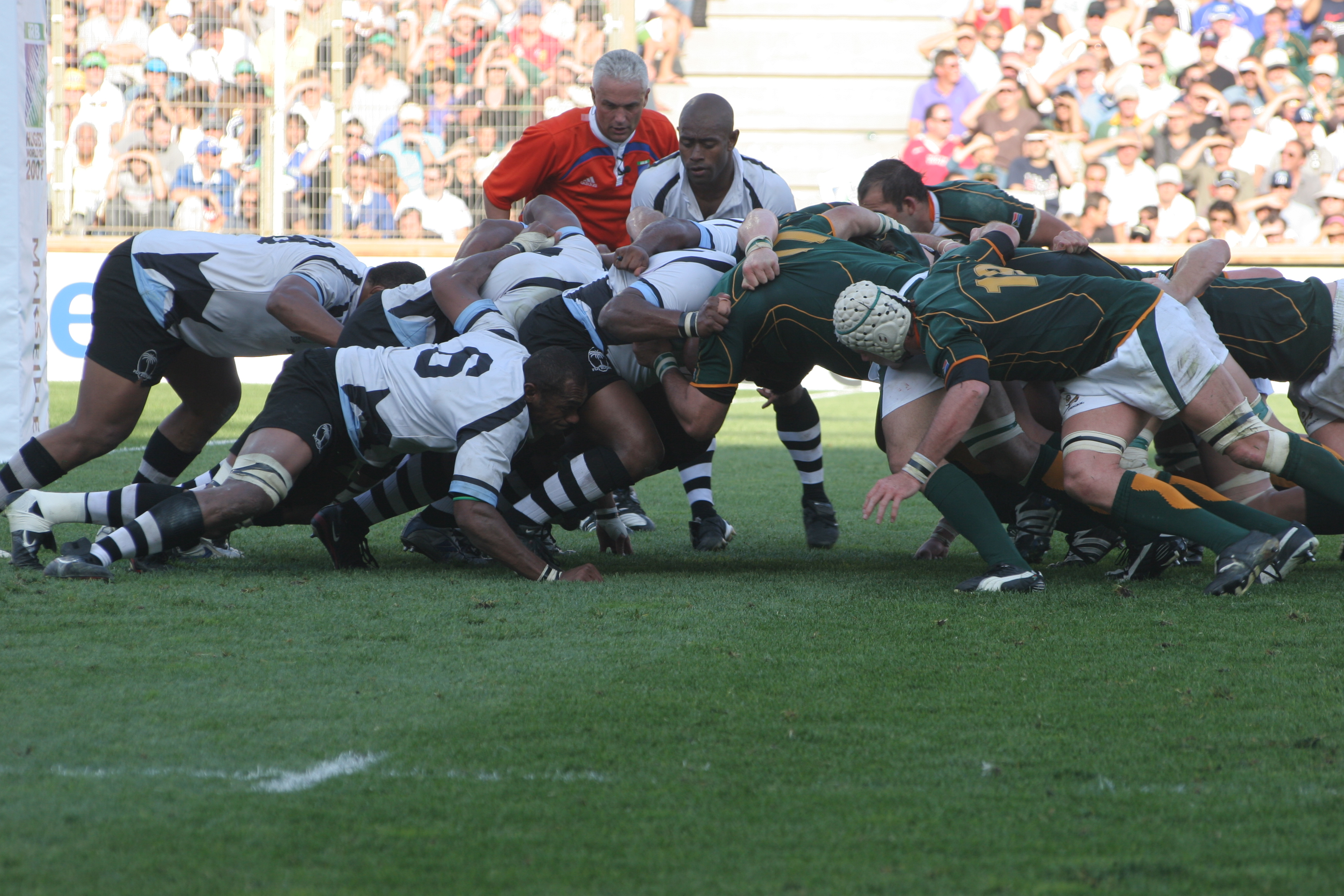
Fiji vs South Africa at the 2007 RWC

Fiji were placed in Pool B of the 2007 Rugby World Cup along with Wales, Canada, Japan and Australia. After beating Japan and Canada in close matches, Fiji rested several key players against Australia for the crucial game against Wales. Australia defeated Fiji by 55–12. Fiji's fate in the tournament came down to a "winner advances" game against Wales which Fiji won 38–34 and qualified for the quarter-finals for the second time. Former Wallaby great Michael Lynagh described the see-sawing match as one of the best matches "of all time". Fiji lost their quarter final match against South Africa, however their above expectations performance in the tournament resulted in them moving up to 9th in the world rankings – their highest ever position at the time. Shannon Fraser and Gregg Mumm from Australia acted as assistant coaches for the period leading up to the world cup and were accredited for much of the Fijians side's success.

=== 2011 Rugby World Cup ===
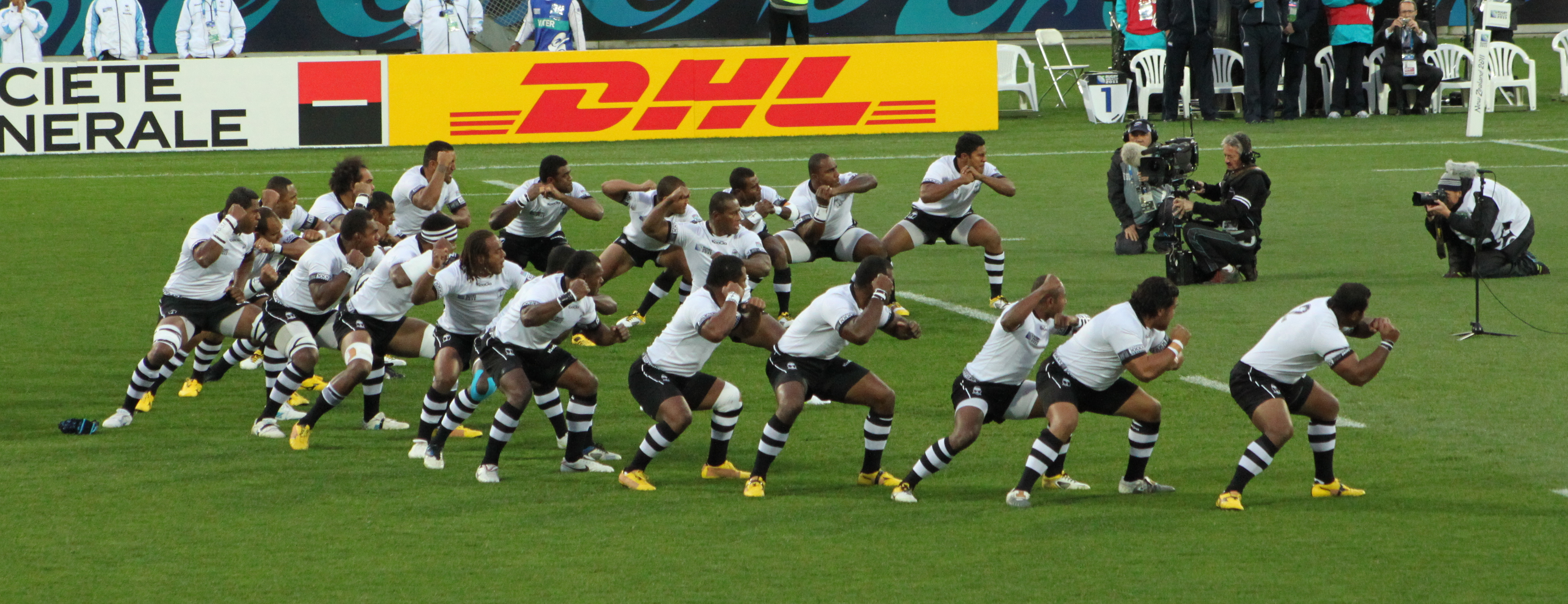
Fiji presenting Cibi before 2011 Rugby World Cup match against South Africa.

Fiji was placed in Pool D of the 2011 Rugby World Cup along with South Africa, Wales, Samoa and Namibia. Fiji won their first match against Namibia with 49–25. But it could not manage to repeat 2007 World Cup performance. They lost to South Africa, Wales and Samoa with huge margins. Final scores were 3–49 against South Africa, 7–27 against Samoa & 0–66 against Wales.

=== 2023 Rugby World Cup ===
Fiji was placed in Pool C of the 2023 Rugby World Cup along with Georgia, Australia, Wales and Portugal. Fiji lost 32–26 to Wales in their opening match. Fiji then defeated Australia 22–15, their first victory over Australia since 1954.

== Record ==
Men's World Rugby Rankings Top 20 as of 16 November 2026
Rank	Change (Note: Change from the previous week)	Team	Points
1	Steady	South Africa	91.53
2	Steady	New Zealand	90.65
3	▲1	France	89.05
4	▼1	Ireland	88.70
5	Steady	England	86.99
6	Steady	Scotland	85.28
7	Steady	Australia	82.24
8	Steady	Argentina	82.09
9	▲1	Wales	79.37
10	▼1	Fiji	77.79
11	Steady	Italy	75.84
12	Steady	Japan	75.25
13	Steady	Georgia	74.23
14	▲1	United States	68.39
15	▼1	Portugal	68.24
16	▲3	Samoa	67.60
17	▲1	Chile	67.00
18	▼2	Spain	66.53
19	▼2	Tonga	65.58
20	Steady	Uruguay	65.17

Fiji's historical rankings

Source: World Rugby
Graph updated to 16 November 2026

Below is table of the representative rugby matches played by a Fiji national XV at test level up until 16 October 2025.

Opponent	Played	Won	Lost	Drawn	Win %	For	Aga	Diff
Argentina	4	1	3	0	25.0%	96	130	−34
Australia	24	3	20	1	12.5%	309	686	−377
Barbarians	4	1	3	0	25%	91	159	−68
Belgium	1	1	0	0	100%	76	0	+76
British & Irish Lions	1	1	0	0	100%	25	21	+4
Canada	13	10	3	0	76.92%	472	231	+241
Canada XV	1	1	0	0	100%	13	3	+10
Chile	1	1	0	0	100%	41	16	+25
Classic All Blacks	1	1	0	0	100%	33	14	+19
Cook Islands	2	2	0	0	100%	161	13	+148
England	9	1	8	0	12.5%	163	355	−192
England XV	3	0	3	0	0%	38	92	−54
France	11	1	10	0	9.09%	149	407	−258
France XV	1	0	1	0	0%	4	13	−9
Georgia	8	6	1	1	75%	200	109	+91
Hong Kong	3	3	0	0	100%	155	33	+122
Ireland	6	0	6	0	0%	85	259	−174
Ireland XV	2	0	2	0	0%	15	24	−9
Italy	12	6	6	0	50%	275	282	−7
Japan	21	17	4	0	80.95%	597	402	+195
Namibia	2	2	0	0	100%	116	43	+73
Māori All Blacks	29	7	20	2	24.14%	383	517	−134
New Zealand	8	0	8	0	0%	91	528	−437
New Zealand XV	5	0	5	0	0%	25	155	−130
Niue	1	1	0	0	100%	120	4	+116
Papua New Guinea	3	3	0	0	100%	253	3	+250
Portugal	3	2	1	0	66.67%	85	54	+31
Romania	3	2	1	0	66.67%	70	42	+28
Samoa	57	33	21	3	57.89%	1,173	994	+179
Scotland	11	3	8	0	27.27%	247	357	−110
Scotland XV	2	0	2	0	0%	22	53	−31
Solomon Islands	2	2	0	0	100%	199	13	+186
South Africa	3	0	3	0	0%	41	129	−88
Spain	3	3	0	0	100%	115	52	+63
Tonga	96	66	27	3	68.75%	1,963	1,286	+677
United States	7	6	1	0	85.71%	165	100	+65
Uruguay	4	3	1	0	75%	181	76	+105
Wales	15	2	12	1	13.33%	235	447	−212
Wales XV	3	0	3	0	0%	33	67	−34
Total	385	191	183	11	49.61%	8,515	8,169	+346

=== World Cup record ===
Rugby World Cup record									Qualification						
Year	Round	Pld	W	D	L	PF	PA	Squad	Pos	Pld	W	D	L	PF	PA
(New Zealand) (Australia) 1987	Quarter-finals	4	1	0	3	72	132	Squad	Invited						
(England) (France) (Ireland) (Scotland) (Wales) 1991	Pool Stage	3	0	0	3	27	63	Squad	Automatically qualified						
(South Africa) 1995	Did not qualify								P/O	2	1	0	1	26	34
(Wales) 1999	QF play-offs	4	2	0	2	148	113	Squad	2nd	5	4	0	1	151	116
(Australia) 2003	Pool Stage	4	2	0	2	98	114	Squad	1st	4	3	0	1	123	80
(France) 2007	Quarter-finals	5	3	0	2	134	173	Squad	2nd	4	3	0	1	74	83
(New Zealand) 2011	Pool Stage	4	1	0	3	59	167	Squad	Automatically qualified						
(England) 2015	Pool Stage	4	1	0	3	84	101	Squad	P/O	1	1	0	0	108	6
(Japan) 2019	Pool Stage	4	1	0	3	110	108	Squad	1st	4	4	0	0	101	60
(France) 2023	Quarter-finals	5	2	0	3	112	113	Squad	Automatically qualified						
(Australia) 2027	Qualified								Automatically qualified						
(United States) 2031	To be determined								To be determined						
Total	—	37	13	0	24	844	1084	—	—	20	16	0	4	583	379
Champions; Runners–up; Third place; Fourth place; Home venue

=== Pacific Nations Cup ===
Fiji previously competed in the Pacific Tri-Nations winning 9 tournaments. The Pacific Nations Cup replaced the Tri-Nations tournament in 2006. Fiji have won seven tournaments.

Tournament	Won	Drawn	Lost	Fiji finish
2006	2	0	2	3rd / 5
2007	1	1	3	4th / 6
2008	2	0	3	4th / 6
2009	3	0	1	2nd / 5
2010	2	0	1	2nd / 4
2011	1	0	2	4th / 4
2012	2	0	1	2nd / 4
2013	3	0	1	1st / 5
2014	1	0	1	2nd / 3
2015	3	1	0	1st / 6
2016	2	0	0	1st / 3
2017	2	0	0	1st / 3
2018	2	0	0	1st / 4
2019	2	0	1	2nd / 6
2022	1	0	2	3rd / 4
2024	4	0	0	1st / 6
2025	4	0	0	1st / 6
2026	1	0	1	2nd / 4
Total	38	2	19	7 titles

=== Wins against Tier 1 nations ===
Fiji have recorded 19 wins against tier 1 opposition. In addition, Fiji drew with Australia 3–3 on 1 July 1961 at the Olympic Park Stadium, Melbourne, Australia, as well as 16–16 with Wales on 19 November 2010 at the Millennium Stadium, Cardiff, Wales.

9 August 1952	Australia	15–17	Fiji	(Australia) Sydney Cricket Ground
	Try: Cox; Shehadie; Stapleton; Windon; Drop: Solomon	Report	Try: Ralagi; Salabogi; Con: Vatubua; Pen: Vatubua; Ranavue; Drop: Ranavue	Attendance: 42,004; Referee: Don Furness (Australia)

26 June 1954	Australia	16–18	Fiji	(Australia) Sydney Cricket Ground
	Try: Cross; Shehadie; Con: Barker (2); Pen: Barker (2)	Report	Try: Saukuru; Seruvatu; Pen: Nawalu; Ranavue (3)	Attendance: 33,099; Referee: Don Furness (Australia)

14 June 1980	Fiji	16–3	Italy	(Fiji) National Stadium, Suva

24 May 1987	Argentina	9–28	Fiji	(New Zealand) Rugby Park, Hamilton
	Try: Travaglini; Con: Porta; Pen: Porta	Report	Try: Gale; Naivilawasa; Savai; Nalaga; Con: Koroduadua (2); Rokowailoa; Pen: Koroduadua	Attendance: 12,000; Referee: Jim Fleming (Scotland)

26 May 1998	Fiji	51–26	Scotland	(Fiji) National Stadium, Suva
	Try: Lasagavibau (3); Naevo; Veitayaki; Waqabitu; Con: Little; Serevi (4); Pen: Little; Serevi	Report	Try: Bulloch; Gilmour; Con: Lee (2); Pen: Lee (4)	Attendance: 20,000; Referee: Paul Honiss (New Zealand)

28 August 1999	Italy	32–50	Fiji	(Italy) Stadio Tommaso Fattori, L'Aquila
	Try: Checchinato; Martin; Pucciariello; Con: Domínguez; Pen: Domínguez (5)	Report	Try: Satala (2); Serevi; Tiko; Vunibaka; Con: Little (5); Pen: Little (5)	Attendance: 5,000; Referee: Stewart Piercy (England)

15 July 2000	Fiji	43–9	Italy	(Fiji) Churchill Park, Lautoka
	Try: Ligairi; Little; Raiwalui; Satala; Vunibaka; Con: Little (3); Pen: Little (4)	Report	Pen: Mazzariol; Pez (2)	Attendance: 11,000; Referee: Mark Lawrence (South Africa)

17 July 2006	Fiji	29–18	Italy	(Fiji) Churchill Park, Lautoka
	Try: Caucaunibuca; Ligairi; Rauluni; Salabogi; Con: Bai (3); Pen: Bai	Report	Try: Lo Cicero; Parisse; Con: Pez; Pen: Pez (2)	Referee: Marius Jonker (South Africa)

29 September 2007	Wales	34–38	Fiji	(France) Stade de la Beaujoire, Nantes
	Try: Popham 34' c S Williams 45' c G Thomas 48' m M Jones 51' c M Williams 73' m Con: Hook (1/1); S Jones (2/4); Pen: S Jones (1/2) 5'	Report	Try: Qera 16' c Delasau 19' m Leawere 25' c Dewes 77' c Con: Little (3/4); Pen: Little (4/5) 21', 24' 54', 60'	Attendance: 37,080; Referee: Stuart Dickinson (Australia)

7 June 2014	Fiji	25–14	Italy	(Fiji) National Stadium, Suva
15:10 FJT (UTC+12)	Try: Nadolo 19' m Waqaniburotu 66' c Nalaga 79' c Con: Ralulu (0/1); Nadolo (2/2) 62', 79'; Pen: Ralulu (0/1); Nadolo (2/2) 65', 71'	Report (In Italian)	Try: Penalty Try (2) 9' c, 76' c Con: Orquera (2/2) 10', 76'; Pen: Orquera (0/2)	Attendance: 12,000; Referee: JP Doyle (England)

17 June 2017	Fiji	22–19	Italy	(Fiji) National Stadium, Suva
14:40 FJT (UTC+12)	Try: Vasiteri 3' m Vatubua 16' c Goneva 44' c Con: Volavola 3', 16'; Drop: Volavola 79'	Report	Try: Mbandà 56'; Con: Allan 57'; Pen: Allan 6', 14', 27', 76'	Referee: Paul Williams (New Zealand)

24 June 2017	Fiji	27–22	Scotland	(Fiji) ANZ National Stadium, Suva
14:30 FJT (UTC+12)	Try: Yato 37' m Seniloli 62' c Con: Volavola (1/2) 63'; Pen: Volavola (5/6) 25', 36', 46', 56', 68'		Try: Ford 30' c Jackson 53' c Brown 75' m Con: Jackson (2/3) 31', 54'; Pen: Jackson (1/1) 61'	Referee: Pascal Gaüzère (France)

24 November 2018	France	14–21	Fiji	Stade de France, Saint-Denis
21:05 CET (UTC+1)	Try: Guirado 25'c, 45' c Con: Serin (2/2) 25', 46'; Pen: Serin (0/1)		Try: Radradra 21' c Tuisova 31' m Con: Volavola (1/2) 21'; Pen: Volavola (3/4) 44', 58', 82'	Attendance: 42 200; Referee: Matthew Carley (England)

5 August 2023	Japan	12–35	Fiji	(Japan) Chichibunomiya Rugby Stadium, Tokyo
19:15 JST (UTC+09)	Try: Naikabula 71' c Masirewa 77' m Con: Lee Seung-sin (1/2) 72'		Try: Nayacalevu 4' c Mawi 17' c Kuruvoli 38' c Lomani (2) 58' c, 81' c Con: Volavola (4/4) 5', 18', 39', 59'; Tela (1/1) 82'	Attendance: 27,000; Referee: Matthew Carley (England)

26 August 2023	England	22–30	Fiji	(England) Twickenham Stadium, London
15:15 BST (UTC+01)	Try: May 9' m Smith 57' c Marchant 68' c Con: Ford (2/3) 58', 69'; Pen: Ford (1/1) 6'		Try: Nayacalevu 43' c Habosi 52' c Kuruvoli 72' c Con: Muntz (3/3) 44', 54', 74'; Pen: Muntz (3/3) 18', 56', 62'	Attendance: 56,854; Referee: Jaco Peyper (South Africa)

17 September 2023	Australia	15–22	Fiji	(France) Stade Geoffroy-Guichard, Saint-Étienne
17:45 CEST (UTC+2)	Try: Nawaqanitawase 23' m Suliasi Vunivalu 67' c Con: Donaldson (1/2) 69'; Pen: Donaldson (1/1) 2'	Report	Try: Tuisova 42' c Con: Kuruvoli (1/1) 43'; Pen: Kuruvoli (4/4) 11', 20', 26', 32'; Lomani (1/3) 65'	Referee: Andrew Brace (Ireland)

21 September 2024	Japan	17–41	Fiji	(Japan) Hanazono Rugby Stadium, Higashiōsaka
19:05 JST (UTC+09)	Try: Karawalevu (3) 32' c, 70'c, 75' c Loganimasi 59' c Tuisue 67' c Con: Muntz (5/5) 33', 60', 68', 71', 76'; Pen: Muntz (2/2) 10', 56'	Report	Try: Riley 20' c Tuitama 78' c Con: Seung-sin (2/2) 21', 78'; Pen: Seung-sin (1/1) 7'	Referee: Nic Berry (Australia)

10 November 2024	Wales	19–24	Fiji	(Wales) Principality Stadium, Cardiff
13:40 GMT (UTC+0)	Try: Murray 8' c Penalty try 19'; Bevan 66' m Con: Anscombe (1/1) 9'	Report	Try: Muntz 24' c Tuisova 60' m Con: Muntz (1/2) 25'; Pen: Muntz (4/4) 12', 43', 49', 75'	Referee: Luc Ramos (France)

12 July 2025	Fiji	29–14	Scotland	HFC Bank Stadium, Suva
15:00 FJT (UTC+12)		Report		Referee: Ben O'Keeffe (New Zealand)

== Kit history ==
Fiji traditionally plays with a home kit consisting of a white shirt, black shorts and black and white hooped socks. The away kit traditionally used to be a white and black hooped shirt with white shorts and hooped socks, although since KooGa's tenure as supplier, colours such as light blue or black were used. Since 2010, some jerseys started to have patterns similar to those found on the masi cloths on the jersey designs.

=== Kit suppliers ===
Period	Kit manufacturer	Main shirt sponsor
1987–2003	Canterbury	National Bank of Fiji
1987–2003	Canterbury	Vodafone
2004–2005	Cotton Traders	Digicel
2005–2016	KooGa–BLK	Fiji Flour Mills
2005–2016	KooGa–BLK	Fiji Airways
2005–2016	KooGa–BLK	Vodafone
2017–2021	ISC	Fiji Airways
2017–2021	ISC	Vodafone
2017–2021	ISC	Swire Shipping
2021–2024	Nike	Fiji Water
2025–present	Umbro	Fiji Water

1987 Home	1991 Home	1999-03 Home	1999 Alternate	2007 Home	2011 Home	2015 Home	2017 Home	2019 Home	2020 Home	2021 Home

== Players ==
=== Current squad ===
On 30 October, Fiji named a 35-player squad ahead of the 2026 Nations Championship Northern Hemisphere Series.

- Caps updated: 14 November 2026 (after Ireland v Fiji)

Head Coach: Jake White

Player	Position	Date of birth (age)	Caps	Club/province
Tevita Ikanivere	Hooker	6 September 1999 (age 27)	38	(Japan) Honda Heat
Peniami Narisia	Hooker	10 June 1997 (age 29)	1	(France) Clermont
Zuriel Togiatama	Hooker	3 February 1999 (age 27)	15	(England) Newcastle Red Bulls
Eroni Mawi	Prop	6 February 1996 (age 30)	53	(England) Saracens
Vilikesa Narisia	Prop	6 March 2002 (age 24)	2	(England) Saracens
Marika Parker	Prop	14 December 2001 (age 24)	0	(New Zealand) Taranaki
Peni Ravai	Prop	16 June 1990 (age 36)	60	(Fiji) Fijian Drua
Inoke Ravuiwasa	Prop	4 September 1996 (age 30)	4	(Fiji) Suva
Luke Tagi	Prop	23 June 1997 (age 29)	19	(France) Bayonne
Isoa Nasilasila	Lock	13 September 1999 (age 27)	36	(Japan) JR East Green Warriors Tokatsu
Pita Gus Sowakula	Lock	26 October 1994 (age 32)	7	(France) Clermont
Setareki Turagacoke	Lock	13 September 1999 (age 27)	3	(France) Stade Français Paris
Mesake Vocevoce	Lock	16 May 2003 (age 23)	22	(Fiji) Fijian Drua
Elia Canakaivata	Back row	12 July 1996 (age 30)	25	(England) Sale Sharks
Nathan Hughes	Back row	10 June 1991 (age 35)	1	(France) Racing 92
Kitione Salawa Jr.	Back row	23 May 2001 (age 25)	18	(Fiji) Fijian Drua
Lekima Tagitagivalu	Back row	4 December 1995 (age 30)	14	(France) Racing 92
Joseva Tamani	Back row	2 April 1997 (age 29)	4	(New Zealand) Otago
Peceli Yato	Back row	17 January 1993 (age 33)	26	(France) Perpignan
Frank Lomani	Scrum-half	18 April 1996 (age 30)	51	(Fiji) Fijian Drua
Simione Kuruvoli	Scrum-half	2 January 1999 (age 27)	27	(Fiji) Fijian Drua
Terio Tamani	Scrum-half	6 July 1994 (age 32)	3	(Fiji) Kadavu
Vilimoni Botitu	Fly-half	15 June 1998 (age 28)	20	(France) Castres Olympique
Caleb Muntz	Fly-half	30 October 1999 (age 27)	26	(France) Provence
Ben Volavola	Fly-half	13 January 1991 (age 35)	40	(Australia) Queensland Reds
Setareki Bituniyata	Centre	12 August 1995 (age 31)	1	(France) Provence
Vinaya Habosi	Centre	30 January 2000 (age 26)	13	(France) Racing 92
Sireli Maqala	Centre	21 March 2000 (age 26)	17	(France) Bayonne
Iosefo Masi	Centre	9 May 1998 (age 28)	11	(France) Lyon
Josua Tuisova	Centre	4 February 1994 (age 32)	36	(France) Racing 92
Ponepati Loganimasi	Wing	26 March 1998 (age 28)	9	(England) Sale Sharks
Salesi Rayasi	Wing	25 September 1996 (age 30)	8	(France) Bordeaux Bègles
Selestino Ravutaumada	Wing	30 December 1999 (age 26)	14	(France) Racing 92
Jiuta Wainiqolo	Wing	10 March 1999 (age 27)	24	(France) Lyon
Isikeli Rabitu	Fullback	22 January 2005 (age 21)	4	(Fiji) Fijian Drua

== Player records ==
=== Most caps ===
#	Player	Pos	Span	Mat	Start	Sub	Won	Lost	Draw	%
1	Nicky Little	Fly-half	1996–2011	71	60	11	37	34	0	52.11
2	Leone Nakarawa	Lock	2009–2021	66	61	5	34	30	2	52.34
3	Akapusi Qera	Flanker	2005–2018	64	55	9	32	30	2	51.56
4	Campese Ma'afu	Prop	2010–2019	62	52	10	31	29	2	51.61
5	Peni Ravai	Prop	2013–present	61	23	38	32	27	2	52.46
6	Vereniki Goneva	Centre	2007–2019	59	49	10	28	29	2	49.15
7	Sunia Koto	Hooker	2005–2017	57	47	10	30	26	1	53.50
8	Seremaia Bai	Centre	2000–2016	53	50	3	27	25	1	51.88
9	Eroni Mawi	Prop	2018–present	52	36	16	28	23	1	53.85
10	Frank Lomani	Scrum-half	2017-present	51	42	11	25	25	1	50.00
10	Manasa Saulo	Prop	2012-2022	51	38	13	27	23	1	56.38
10	Dominiko Waqaniburotu	Flanker	2010–2019	51	49	2	28	23	0	54.90

Last updated: Italy vs Fiji, 21 November 2026. Statistics include officially capped matches only.

=== Most tries ===
#	Player	Pos	Span	Mat	Start	Sub	Pts	Tries
1	Vereniki Goneva	Centre	2007–2019	59	49	10	110	22
1	Nemani Nadolo	Wing	2010–2021	32	30	2	237	22
3	Sanivalati Laulau	Wing	1980–1985	32	32	0	80	20
4	Tevita Ikanivere	Hooker	2020–present	40	31	9	95	19
5	Waisea Nayacalevu	Wing	2012–2024	45	39	6	90	18
6	Norman Ligairi	Fullback	2000–2010	47	39	8	85	17
7	Timoci Nagusa	Wing	2008–2018	33	26	7	80	16
7	Viliame Satala	Centre	1999–2005	29	27	2	80	16
9	Fero Lasagavibau	Wing	1997–2002	23	20	3	75	15
10	Leone Nakarawa	Lock	2009–2021	66	61	5	65	13
10	Metuisela Talebula	Wing	2012–2018	24	22	2	73	13
10	Aisea Tuilevu	Wing	1996–2004	19	18	1	65	13

Last updated: Italy vs Fiji, 21 November 2026. Statistics include officially capped matches only.

=== Most points ===
#	Player	Pos	Span	Mat	Start	Sub	Pts	Tries	Conv	Pens	Drop
1	Nicky Little	Fly-half	1996–2011	71	60	11	670	2	117	140	2
2	Seremaia Bai	Centre	2000–2016	53	50	3	321	5	58	59	1
3	Ben Volavola	Fly-half	2015–present	48	40	8	311	4	78	44	1
4	Severo Koroduadua	Fullback	1982–1991	27	27	0	268	0	56	47	5
5	Nemani Nadolo	Wing	2010–2021	32	30	2	237	22	32	21	0
6	Waisale Serevi	Fly-half	1989–2003	38	23	15	221	11	40	27	3
7	Caleb Muntz	Fly-half	2023–present	27	24	3	187	2	48	27	0
8	Vereniki Goneva	Centre	2007–2019	59	49	10	110	22	0	0	0
9	Taniela Rawaqa	Fullback	2007–2011	17	13	4	103	4	19	15	0
10	Tevita Ikanivere	Hooker	2020-present	40	31	9	95	19	0	0	0

Last updated: Italy vs Fiji, 21 November 2026. Statistics include officially capped matches only.

=== Most points in a match ===
#	Player	Pos	Pts	Tries	Conv	Pens	Drop	Opposition	Venue	Date
1.	Severo Koroduadua	Fullback	36	0	18	0	0	Niue	(Samoa) Apia	10 September 1983
2.	Semesa Sikivou	Scrum-half	27	1	12	0	0	Solomon Islands	(Papua New Guinea) Port Moresby	21 August 1969
3.	Nicky Little	Fly-half	25	0	5	5	0	Italy	(Italy) L'Aquila	28 August 1999
4.	Tevita Makutu	Wing	24	6	0	0	0	Papua New Guinea	(Fiji) Suva	30 August 1979
4.	Sanivalati Laulau	Wing	24	6	0	0	0	Solomon Islands	(Samoa) Apia	8 September 1983
4.	Nicky Little	Fly-half	24	0	6	4	0	Hong Kong	Hong Kong	29 September 1996
7.	Nicky Little	Fly-half	23	1	3	4	0	Italy	(Fiji) Lautoka	15 July 2000
7.	Nicky Little	Fly-half	23	0	1	7	0	Samoa	(Japan) Tokyo	8 July 2001
7.	Ben Volavola	Fly-half	23	1	9	0	0	Uruguay	(England) Hartpury	17 November 2018
10.	6 players on 22 points									

Last updated: New Zealand vs Fiji, 19 July 2024. Statistics include officially capped matches only.

=== Most tries in a match ===
#	Player	Pos	Pts	Tries	Conv	Pens	Drop	Opposition	Venue	Date
1.	Tevita Makutu	Wing	24	6	0	0	0	Papua New Guinea	(Fiji) Suva	30 August 1979
1.	Sanivalati Laulau	Wing	24	6	0	0	0	Solomon Islands	(Samoa) Apia	8 September 1983
3.	George Sailosi	Wing	15	5	0	0	0	Papua New Guinea	(Papua New Guinea) Port Moresby	18 August 1969
4.	9 players on 4 tries									

Last updated: New Zealand vs Fiji, 19 July 2024. Statistics include officially capped matches only.

=== Most matches as captain ===
#	Player	Pos	Span	Mat	Won	Lost	Draw	%	Pts	Tries
1	Akapusi Qera	Flanker	2011–2018	38	22	15	1	59.21	20	4
2	Greg Smith	Hooker	1996–2003	30	17	13	0	56.66	5	1
3	Tevita Ikanivere	Hooker	2024-	24	14	10	0	58.33	80	16
4	Waisea Nayacalevu	Wing	2020–2024	20	10	9	1	55.00	45	9
5	Esala Teleni	Number 8	1983–1989	19	8	11	0	42.10	28	7
6	Mosese Rauluni	Scrum-half	2004–2008	17	10	7	0	58.82	5	1
7	Dominiko Waqaniburotu	Flanker	2010–2019	16	8	8	0	50.00	10	2
8	Epi Bolawaqatabu	Number 8	1969–1973	12	6	5	1	54.16	21	7
8	Deacon Manu	Prop	2010–2012	12	3	8	1	29.16	0	0
10	Alifereti Doviverata	Number 8	2001–2007	11	4	7	0	36.36	5	1
10	Simon Raiwalui	Lock	1999–2006	11	7	4	0	63.63	5	1

Last updated: Italy vs Fiji, 21 November 2026. Statistics include officially capped matches only.

== Notable players ==
- Sireli Bobo
- Alex Rokobaro
- Rupeni Caucaunibuca
- Bill Cavubati
- Vilimoni Delasau
- Alivereti Doviverata
- Sisa Koyamaibole
- Sunia Koto
- Maleli Kunavore
- Kele Leawere
- Josefa Levula
- Norman Ligairi
- Nicky Little
- Isa Nacewa
- Noa Nadruku
- Apenisa Naevo
- Semisi Naevo
- Sireli Naqelevuki
- Timoci Nagusa
- Napolioni Nalaga
- Seru Rabeni
- Simon Raiwalui
- Kameli Ratuvou
- Jacob Rauluni
- Mosese Rauluni
- Iferemi Rawaqa
- Apolosi Satala
- Viliame Satala
- Waisale Serevi
- Ilivasi Tabua
- Netani Talei
- Setareki Tawake
- Aisea Tuilevu
- Joeli Veitayaki
- Joeli Vidiri
- Marika Vunibaka
- Akapusi Qera

Nat Uluiviti, who also played for the Fiji national cricket team.

== Coaches ==
Years	Coach
1954	(New Zealand) William Goodsir
1964	(Australia) Douglas Walkden-Brown
1987	(Fiji) Jo Sovau
1987-1991	(New Zealand) George Simpkin
1989–1991	(Fiji) Samisoni Viriviri Sr
1996	(Fiji) Meli Kurisaru
1996–1999	(New Zealand) Brad Johnstone
2000–2001	(Australia) Greg Smith
2001–2002	(Fiji) Ifereimi Tawake (caretaker)
2002–2003	(New Zealand) Mac McCallion
2004–2007	(New Zealand) Wayne Pivac
2007–2009	(Fiji) Ilivasi Tabua
2009–2010	(New Zealand) Mike Brewer
2010–2011	(Fiji) Sam Domoni
2012–2014	(Fiji) Inoke Male
2014–2019	(New Zealand) John McKee
2020–2023	(New Zealand) Vern Cotter
2023	(Fiji) Simon Raiwalui
2024–2026	(Australia) Mick Byrne
2026	(Fiji) Senirusi Seruvakula (interim)
2026–	(South Africa) Jake White

== See also ==
- Pacific Tri-Nations
- Fiji Rugby Union
- Rugby World Cup
- Fiji national rugby sevens team
- Fiji national rugby league team
- Pacific Islanders rugby union team
- Colonial Cup
- Digicel Cup
- All Blacks vs Fiji Rugby

== Sources ==
- Fire and flair: Fijian rugby (from the BBC)
- Fiji Rugby World Cup Points Table
