= Stu Forster =

- Born: Stuart Thomas Forster; 12 February 1969 (age 57) Pahiatua, New Zealand
- Height: 1.70 m (5 ft 7 in)
- Weight: 70 kg (150 lb)
- School: Napier Boys' High School

Rugby union career
- Position: Halfback
Provincial / State sides
Years	Team	Apps	(Points)
1988–1989, 2001	Hawke's Bay	43	(34)
1990–1997	Otago	116	(71)
Super Rugby
Years	Team	Apps	(Points)
1996–1997	Otago Highlanders	16	(5)
International career
Years	Team	Apps	(Points)
1990–1996	New Zealand Māori	15	(5)
1993–1995	New Zealand	6	(0)

Stuart Thomas Forster (born 12 February 1969) is a former New Zealand rugby union player. A halfback, Forster represented Hawke's Bay and Otago at a provincial level, and the Otago Highlanders in the first two years of Super Rugby. He was a member of the New Zealand national side, the All Blacks, from 1993 to 1995, appearing in 12 matches including six internationals.

Forster played rugby for Otago in the amateur days and worked as the assistant grounds man at Carisbrook.
