= Don Furness =

Don Furness may refer to:

- Don Furness (Australian rules footballer) (1930–2002)
- Don Furness (rugby union) (1921–c. 1993), Australian rugby union player
