= Wayne Graham (rugby union) =

- Born: Wayne Geoffrey Graham; 13 April 1957 (age 69) Tauranga, New Zealand
- Height: 1.90 m (6 ft 3 in)
- Weight: 95 kg (209 lb)
- School: Tauranga Boys' College
- University: University of Otago

Rugby union career
- Position: Flanker, number 8
Provincial / State sides
Years	Team	Apps	(Points)
1976–86	Otago	112	
International career
Years	Team	Apps	(Points)
1978–79	New Zealand	1	(0)

Wayne Geoffrey Graham (born 13 April 1957) is a former New Zealand rugby union player. A number 8 and flanker, Graham represented Otago at a provincial level, and was a member of the New Zealand national side, the All Blacks, in 1978 and 1979. He played eight matches for the All Blacks including one international.
