= Otago Rugby Football Union =

Rugby union club, based in Otago, New Zealand

- Sport: Rugby union
- Jurisdiction: Otago
- Abbreviation: ORFU
- Founded: 1881; 145 years ago
- Affiliation: New Zealand Rugby
- Headquarters: Dunedin
- President: Roy Daniels

Official website
- www.orfu.co.nz
- (New Zealand)

The Otago Rugby Football Union is the official governing body of rugby union for the Otago region of New Zealand. The union is based in the city of Dunedin, and its home ground is Forsyth Barr Stadium.

The Otago Rugby Football Union was founded in 1881 and celebrated its 125th year in 2006.

== Provincial rugby ==
The top representative team competes in the National Provincial Championship (NPC), New Zealand's top provincial competition. The union was to have been liquidated in March 2012. However a deal involving the Dunedin City Council allowed it to keep operating.

Otago have won the Ranfurly Shield eight times: in 1935, 1938, 1947, 1957, 2013, 2018, 2020 and 2025. They won the NPC in 1991 and 1998. The team has also defeated South Africa and the British and Irish Lions.

== History (1881–1975) ==
=== Ranfurly Shield ===
Otago held the Ranfurly Shield between 1935 and 1938 ansuccessfully defended it eight times, and then again in 1938 for a further five defences. They had a successful run between 1947 and 1950 defending the shield on eighteen occasions before losing it.

Otago then won it in 1957 and defended it once before losing it to Taranaki 11–9, after leading 9–0 earlier in the game. Afterwards the Otago coach Charlie Saxton told the Taranaki captain Peter Burke that 'the better team lost'. Burke replied: 'Charlie, you can say what you like, we've got the shield.'

=== Otago victories over the Lions (1950, 1959 and 1966) ===
Otago has had a good record against the British and Irish Lions having beaten them in 1950 and 1959. In 1966, Otago again defeated the British and Irish Lions 17–9. On that day Carisbrook was full with 25,500 fans attending the game. Dave Edwards, playing on the wing, scored one try and Maurie Collins, playing on the opposite wing, scored two tries for Otago to help seal the victory.

The 1975 Otago rugby team was recognized as one of the greats as it won 15 games and only lost two games all season. They beat Scotland 19–15, Auckland 22–4 and went undefeated on their North Island tour.

== National provincial championship (1976–2005) ==
After the success of the 1975 team, a number of players left the team and performances slowly went downhill in the late 1970s. Otago came 7th in 1976; 9th in 1977; 9th in 1978 and 11th in 1979 in the national provincial championship.

Lee Smith was appointed the Otago coach in 1980 and coached the team for three years including against the 1981 South African team who Otago lost to 17–13 in a close game. During his coaching reign Otago played 52 games for 25 wins and 27 losses. Lee Smith was replaced by Laurie Mains as Otago coach for the 1983 season as the Otago team had narrowly avoided relegation from the first division in 1982 after coming in 10th place with 2 wins from 10 games.

=== 1983 Laurie Mains appointed coach ===
In 1983, Otago provided an improved performance coming 7th in the National Provincial Championship. Captain Wayne Graham led the team to 4 wins, 2 draws (including a nil all draw with Auckland) and 4 losses.

1984 provided the best performance from an Otago team for some years as they achieved third place with seven wins and three losses. They also played France losing the game 20–10.

Laurie Mains appointed Mike Brewer when he was 20 years old as captain of Otago in 1985 to take over from Wayne Graham. Otago played a very structured game with the forwards attempting to dominate and Dean Kenny, John Haggart or Lindsay Smith kicking for position and attempting to force the opposition to make errors. Mike Brewer and Laurie Mains worked on a plan for Otago to improve with the aim to win the National Provincial Championship by 1992. Otago finished 5th in the National Provincial Championship in 1985. They defeated Auckland at Carisbrook 12–10, one week after Auckland had lifted the Ranfurly Shield from Canterbury. Otago also played England at Carisbrook losing by 25 -16.

In 1986, Otago finished one better coming 4th in the National Provincial Championship. Outside of the NPC, Otago played East Coast winning a one sided game 91–10. Paul Turner scored two tries, kicked 14 conversions and one penalty.

Otago had had a good year in 1987 coming third in the National Provincial Championship. Otago won six games and lost four games. They played a further seven non championship games in 1987, winning all of them including a 51–7 victory over Sydney.

The following year (1988) was also good for Otago. They finished third in the National Provincial Championship winning eight games and losing only two games, one to Wellington and a close game in a Ranfurly Shield challenge to Auckland. The Otago team had a forward pack including Gordon Macpherson, Richard Knight, Paul Henderson, Mike Brewer, Arran Pene and Brent Pope. On the wings were John Timu who scored 16 tries (including two bags of four tries) and Noel Pilcher who scored 15 tries respectively that season for Otago. Otago played Wales and almost beat them 13–15 in a close match at Carisbrook in May 1988. They had a short tour to Australia, defeating the Australian Baabaas 32–16, ACT 50–3 and drawing with Sydney 11–11.

Otago came 5th in the 1989 edition of the National Provincial Championship. They also toured Argentina and played three games defeating San Isidro 28–15; Banco Nacionale 37–27 and a Mendoza Selection 25–21.

Otago came 3rd in 1990 in the National Provincial Championship. They won eight out of their ten games only losing to Waikato and Auckland They also toured Canada, winning all three games, against Canada 23–6; British Columbia 20–9 and the University of British Columbia 36–12. Otago played Australia at Carisbrook losing 20–24 in a close match. John Timu scored two tries and Paul Cooke one try for Otago in the game.

=== 1991 National Provincial Championship Victory ===
The Otago team captained by Mike Brewer and coached by Laurie Mains won every game that season bar the second game of season against Counties in the National Provincial Championship. The crunch game was against Auckland at Carisbrook where Otago won 17–6 with tries from Greg Cooper and Jamie Joseph. The final game of the season was against North Harbour at home with Otago winning 26–10. Marc Ellis, Paul Cooke and John Haggart all scored tries. Of the 1991 team, eleven of the regulars ended up playing more than 100 games for the province and the other eight played more than 50 games. The team had a great culture and Steve Hotton commented that "There were country guys, town guys and university students and we all got on really well".

=== 1992 Second place in National Provincial Championship ===
1992 was the year that playoffs were introduced into the National Provincial Championship. The Otago team, now coached by Gordon Hunter, reached the semi-final against North Harbour which was played at Carisbrook. At half time, Otago led 13–3 thanks to a Paul Cooke try, a John Timu drop goal and Greg Cooper's goal kicking prowess. In the second half, North Harbour pulled the score back to finish with a 16 -16 draw prompting extra time. In extra time, Frank Bunce scored a try for North Harbour and then Greg Cooper kicked a penalty and scored a converted try in the corner for Otago to win 26–23.

The final was played in Waikato and was a disappointing game for Otago who lost 40–5. Waikato had a dominant forward pack in the game. The game is of note as Richard Loe was suspended for six months for eye gouging Greg Cooper.

=== 1993 Second place in National Provincial Championship ===
Otago defeated Waikato in the semifinal with a solid 36–22 victory at Carisbrook. The final was against Auckland in Auckland. Unfortunately, it started badly and by halftime, Auckland was ahead 20–3. Otago came back in the second half to score two tries but by this stage it was all over. The final score being 27–18. Josh Kronfeld ended up going off with a smashed cheekbone. and Jason Chandler from Auckland was sent off as a result.

=== 1993 Otago victory over the Lions ===
Otago played a high tempo game against the touring British and Irish Lions in 1993. Otago scored five tries in their 37–24 victory. Paul Cooke scored twice and David Latta, John Leslie and John Timu all scored tries against the near-full strength team which was preparing for the first test against the All Blacks. The BBC said that "In scoring five tries and 37 points, Otago gave the tourists a record kicking".

The Lions were expected to dominate the tight five but could not match the mobility of the Otago pack. Stu Forster commented that "We were given no chance, and we stuffed it right up them." Gordon Hunter (who also worked as a police detective) was asked a question by an English journalist in the post match press conference. He reached for his notebook and after flicking through a few pages, paused, and said to the surprise and mirth of everyone: "Sorry, they're my murder inquiry notes."

=== 1994 Otago victory over the Springboks ===
Otago played the Springboks on the 27th of July 1994 in very wet conditions. 22,000 people attended Carisbrook to watch the game. The Springboks made a great start with Joost van der Westhuizen scoring 16 seconds after the kick off after a Stephen Bachop kick was charged down. Otago came back and John Leslie running on an angle scored under the posts. Jeff Wilson kicked 5 out of 6 goal kicks over for Otago to win 19–12. David Latta played one of his greatest games as captain with the Otago forward pack outplaying the much larger Springbok pack.

The Springbok head, given to the first provincial team to beat the touring South Africans on each tour was presented by Springbok captain Tiaan Strauss to David Latta at the after-match function under the Rose Stand.

=== 1995 Second place in National Provincial Championship ===
After a mixed season, Otago beat Counties at Pukekoke in the semi-finals to set up a final against Auckland in Auckland. It was to be the last games for Otago for Arran Pene, Jamie Joseph and coach Gordon Hunter. It was also the 100th game that Stu Forster and Paul Cooke were to play for the province. Injuries forced Otago to put Jamie Joseph and reserve Lio Falaniko at lock. Early on in the game, during a lineout, Anton Oliver was hit from behind and turned and threw a punch at Craig Dowd, knocking a few teeth out. Oliver received a one match suspension as a result. The game was played at a high pace and Josh Kronfeld, after being tackled, was taken from the field with a badly sprained ankle. David Latta was brought on as a replacement open side flanker.

Tony Brown kicked an early penalty. Marc Ellis kicked a grubber kick through that lead to a try in the corner for Jeff Wilson.

Otago was ahead by 19–17 with minutes to go when referee Colin Hawke penalized Stu Forster and awarded a penalty try to Auckland to give them the game. Stu Forster said of the penalty try: "I saw Zinny [Brooke] after the game, and he said the ball was definitely out of the scrum when I kicked it. But that's life, that's sport."

Arran Pene said of the game: "I was wide and left a gap for [Mark Carter] because I was going to slam him over the top of the ruck. But I slipped on the surface and let a try in, and that was a turning point. It was a hell of a game, and I remember Zinny dropping the ball with the line open too."

Marc Ellis was very upset by the loss commenting that "We had a cool team, a lot of bloody good guys, and Gordy Hunter was a great bloke as coach. He knew his limitations, but he made us believe in ourselves. And we almost pulled off the unthinkable."

Gordon Hunter lamented that "the final nail was a very cruel call. With both front rows standing, there is no way the penalty try should have gone through."

Referee Colin Hawke admitted in 2020 that he probably should not have awarded the penalty try to Auckland that decided the game. He says that "I could have re-set that scrum.'' He did not have the benefit of video replays or Television Match Officials (TMOs).

The whistle from this game was auctioned off and fetched $2500. It now resides in the Mornington Tavern, Dunedin.

=== 1997 British tour ===
Otago toured Great Britain in 1997 playing seven games. They won all the games defeating Cambridge University 47–23; London Irish 82–14; Scottish Development XV 44–19, England A 42–15, Bath 31–18 Northampton/Leicester 37–8 and Richmond 75–0.

=== 1998 National Provincial Championship Victory ===
Otago had a very strong team in 1998 with 13 players who were present or future All Blacks. The front row of Carl Hoeft, Anton Oliver and Kees Meeuws dominated the scrums, Tony Brown scored 196 points and Brendan Laney scored 15 tries during the season. Otago defeated Wellington 84–10, Northland 82–10, Southland 60–10 and North Harbour 39–8 in the round robin stage, and beat Taranaki 62–12 in the semi-finals.

The Otago team coached by Tony Gilbert and captained by Taine Randell won the 1998 National Provincial Championship final with a resounding victory over Waikato at Carisbrook. Taine Randell won the toss and elected to play the first half into the strong wind. Isotola Maka had to leave the field after 13 minutes with a hamstring injury and then Josh Kronfeld went off after 30 minutes with a shoulder injury. Otago led 10–6 at half time. Brendan Laney scored three times in the second half and Byron Kelleher one. Otago scored seven tries in their 49–20 victory. The 40,000 strong crowd cheered on the Otago team singing We are the Champions at one point. John Leslie, playing his last game for Otago was carried on the shoulders of his team mates at the end of the game.

Jeff Wilson commented that holding the NPC trophy "was one of the most satisfying moments of my rugby life". Anton Oliver said of the team: "I can't recall, before or since, having played with a pack that was regularly as efficient, skilled and ruthless all round. And our backs were also skilled and penetrative all year...crucially our reserves were talented, resolute and reliable". Josh Kronfeld said: I was just stoked by the result, stoked to see a successful end."

=== 2001 Second place in National Provincial Championship ===
Otago played in the round-robin stage of the 2001 National Provincial Championship defeating Northland 37–19 in Whangarei; Southland 53–20; losing to Counties-Manukau 14–11 away and Canterbury 62–19 at home before defeating Auckland in a very close game 23–22 at home. A loss against Waikato 33–20 before a big victories over Bay of Plenty 62–15; Taranaki 64–19 and Wellington 28–10. Otago faced North Harbour in the semifinal at Albany after finishing fourth in the round robin winning 37–10.

The Otago team, coached by Laurie Mains, had a good first half in the final against Canterbury. Tony Brown was playing well until an ankle injury forced him off after 27 minutes. Bryon Kelleher was causing the Canterbury team problems at scrum time. Otago scored first just before halftime. Brendan Laney, playing his last game for Otago scored the only try for Otago. Otago lead at half time 16–6. In the second half, penalties kicked by Andrew Mehrtens and tries to Justin Marshall and Nathan Mauger took Canterbury to the full time score of 30–19. The 10,000 Otago supporters who travelled north to Christchurch to watch the final were left disappointed by the result especially as they lost to Canterbury twice in the 2001 season.

=== 2003 Finished first in the round robin section of the National Provincial Championship ===
The Otago team coached by Greg Cooper had success in the round robin stage. They finished first after winning seven games and losing three games. The team, captained by Kevin Middleton, defeated Auckland first up at Carisbrook in a very low scoring game (6–3). This was despite Otago spending 22 minutes of the match inside the Auckland 22. They were unable to turn this territorial advantage into points. Otago played Auckland in the semi-finals at Carisbrook losing 32–39. Josh Blackie scored two tries and Carl Hayman and Neil Brew each scoring one try in the semi-final loss for Otago.

=== 2005 Second place in National Provincial Championship ===
The Otago team, coached by Wayne Graham, had a strong forward pack in 2005 with Carl Hayman, Anton Oliver and Carl Hoeft in the front row. Nick Evans was in form playing at first five. Otago finished the round robin games in fourth place with six wins from nine games and had to play number one ranked Canterbury in the semi-final. Otago had defeated Canterbury in Dunedin 24–19 on October 1. More than 11,000 attended this game played in the afternoon at Carisbrook.

In the 2005 NPC semi-finals (played on October 14), Otago again defeated Canterbury to win with a 37–22 victory in Christchurch at Jade Stadium. Chris Smylie scored two tries in the game. Otago then travelled to Auckland for the final. The game did not go Otago's way with the Auckland team playing better as the game went on. Auckland scored six tries in the 39–11 victory. Only Josh Blackie was able to score a try for the Otago team.

== Air New Zealand Cup (2006–2009) ==
Four new teams were promoted from the NPC Second Division into the Air New Zealand Cup. The Steve Martin coached Otago had another season reaching the semi-finals, losing to Waikato 44–15 at Waikato Stadium.

2007 began with a 68–7 defeat to Wellington in the capital. Otago would win five matches to reach the quarter-finals where they were beaten by Canterbury 44–6 in Christchurch.

2008 saw Otago win four of their ten matches. However Otago would be the only team to defeat Wellington (36–21) during the regular season. Otago finished in 10th place.

Otago finished 10th once again in 2009 with five wins from thirteen matches.

== ITM Cup (2010–2015) ==
2010 saw a new adopted name as Otago would be known as "the Razorbacks". Otago won only two of thirteen matches and finished with the wooden spoon in last place. It was a difficult year for coach Phil Mooney and a co-coach and additional specialists were to be added to the coaching team for the following year.

Otago challenged Southland for the Ranfurly Shield in 2010. With twelve minutes remaining, Otago was leading 12–9. Southland prop Jamie Mackintosh scored a contentious try. Otago supporters suggested that there was a double-movement and that the try should have been not allowed. Southland held on to the Ranfurly Shield 16–12.

2011 would see Otago placed in the reformatted championship. 2011 was a significant year for Otago with the team playing its final season at Carisbrook before the mid-season relocation to the Forsyth Barr Stadium. Tony Brown returned toplay for the Razorbacks. Otago began the season defeating North Harbour 46–29 at Carisbrook. The following week Otago created history by defeating Auckland 32–25 at Eden Park. It was Otago's first win at Eden Park since 1976. Otago would play Southland in the team's final ever game at Carisbrook, losing 19–12 to the Stags.

Manawatu were supposed to be Otago's first new opponents at the Forsyth Barr Stadium. Bad weather however would postpone the game to later in the season. Otago played Canterbury in the teams' first game at Forsyth Barr Stadium. Canterbury won 29–16 in front of a crowd of 14,067. Otago defeated Manawatu 28–20 to finish 3rd position in the ITM cup championship.

=== 2012 Liquidation ===
On 27 February 2012, it was announced by the New Zealand Rugby Football Union that the Otago Rugby Football Union would be put into liquidation on 2 March 2012. According to the NZRFU, the negative equity held by the ORFU amounted to more than NZ$2million. The Otago Rugby Union's problems came after six years of deficits due to dwindling ticket sales. Revenue at $3.5 million for the year, was less than the $5.6 million in 2010. Poker machine income was $200,000 under budget, as was gate revenue ($138,000), sponsorship ($30,000) and signage ($30,000).

Steve Tew said that no other rugby union was in as bad a shape as Otago was.

It was subsequently announced that the liquidation was to be put on hold until 16 March 2012. On 15 March 2012, a deal was struck between the union and the Dunedin City Council that allowed the union to continue operations.

Tony Brown was named head coach for the 2012 season and Phil Young named as his assistant. Otago went on to win five of ten matches in the 2012 season and reach the Championship semi-finals where they defeated Tasman 41–34. In the Championship final Counties Manukau was too strong running out 41–16 winners.

=== 2013 ITM Cup season ===
2013 began with an opening round win over Bay of Plenty. Otago would go on to win four more matches including one over Auckland. Otago would reach the Championship semi-finals for the second consecutive year, however it was Hawkes Bay who were once again victorious winning 29–24. Otago finished 3rd.

=== 2013 Ranfurly Shield victory ===
In August 2013, Otago overcame 56 years and 22 previous challenges of disappointment to again hold the log o' wood. The Otago team, coached by Tony Brown played Waikato in Hamilton and won 26–19. It was the first time the shield had come to Otago since 1957. Hayden Parker playing at first five scored 21 points and TJ Ioane came off the bench and scored a try from a scrum 5 metres from the Waikato goal line.

Tony Brown said of the team: "I think every one of my players left nothing in the tank and they emptied it for past Otago rugby players," The team made 158 tackles, turned the ball over at nine breakdowns and only had one lineout throw in miss its target.

Otago's shield fever was short lived as Hawkes Bay defeated Otago 20–19 nine days later to take the shield in front of 20,000 supporters at the Forsyth Barr stadium.

=== 2014 onwards ===
2014 was a bit of a downfall for Otago. They beat North Harbour (28–14), Southland (33–22) and Waikato (38–7) and lost a further seven games to finish second last in the ITM Cup Championship.

With Corey Brown appointed coach, The 2015 Otago team finished 3rd in the ITM Cup Championship with six wins against Taranaki (34–27), Wellington (37–36), Southland (61–7) a record result against Southland, North Harbour (39–32), Northland (54–36) and Bay of Plenty (43–30) and four losses.

Wellington ended Otago's premiership dreams with a 34–14 win in the semi-final. James Lentjes and Adam Knight scored tries for Otago but the Wellington defensive effort easily overcame Otago at the Westpac Stadium.

== Mitre 10 Cup (2016–2020) ==
=== 2016 – 2017 Otago Season ===
2016 bought Otago some good results with seven wins and three losses. They beat Southland (40–17), Wellington (44–21), Northland (33–28), Bay of Plenty (33–32), Tasman (30–27), North Harbour (24–13), Manawatu (21–14), Otago defeated Bay of Plenty in the semi finals (27–20) but sadly for Otago, North Harbour crushed Otago's dreams of promotion to the premiership by beating Otago (17–14).

2017 has been good for Otago as they made the semi-finals, having beaten Manawatu (40–30), Hawke's Bay (64–21), Auckland (34–26) and Southland (43–19). Their dreams of promotion to the premiership were ended once again but this time by Bay of Plenty (32–48).

=== 2018 Ranfurly Shield victory ===
2018 saw Otago beat Manawatu (17–50), Northland (27–23), Southland (24–43), Auckland (29–34), Bay of Plenty (45–34) and Waikato 19–23. Otago defeated Hawke's Bay in a home semi-final 20–19 but lost to Waikato in the Championship final 36–13.

Otago and ended the round robin by winning the Ranfurly Shield against Waikato (19–23).

Otago made a very good start to the game. They scored three tries in the first 20 minutes to Mitchell Scott, Josh Dickson and Joketani Koroi. Josh Ioane kicked a penalty over with 20 minutes to go to put Otago ahead by 4 points and Otago successfully defended that lead.

The win at the end of the season meant that Otago would hold on to the Ranfurly Shield until at least the start of the 2019 season.

=== 2019 Ranfurly Shield defences ===
The 2019 preseason saw Otago play in two Ranfurly Shield challenge matches. The first against 2018 Heartland Championship champions Thames Valley and the second against neighbours North Otago. The first challenge saw the Razorbacks defeat Thames Valley 41–21 in a gutsy display from the visitors.

Otago defended the Ranfurly Shield against North Otago in Oamaru 49–14 in July 2019. Otago played a completely different backline to the one that played against Thames Valley.

On 17 August, Otago played against rivals Southland at Forsyth Barr Stadium in a duel where the Ranfurly Shield was at play. Otago retained the Shield convincingly in a 41–22 victory.

Otago, on 30 August, successfully defended the shield against Manawatū 37–20 with Vilimoni Koroi scoring a hattrick of tries. Otago defeated Taranaki 35–27 with Vilimoni Koroi scoring one try, kicking three touchline conversions and three penalties. Otago then saw off Waikato 45–35 on 29 September.

The season ended with disappointment for Otago, as Canterbury beat Otago 35–25 to lift the Ranfurly Shield on 5 October 2019. Sio Tomkinson, Adam Thomson and Jona Nareki all scored tries for Otago with Josh Ioane converting two of them and kicking two penalties.

=== 2020 Ranfurly Shield victory ===
Otago won the Ranfurly Shield off Taranaki in September 2020. The team coached by Tom Donnelly was expected to struggle against Taranaki (who had beaten Canterbury the previous week). Otago dominated the first half, scoring three tries to lead 22–5 at half time. Otago No 8 Dylan Nel scored the first try from a lineout. Josh Ioane played a fine game at first five-eight and scored a try amongst his efforts. Freedom Vahaakolo and Liam Coltman also scored tries for Otago. The final result was 30–19.

Unfortunately for Otago, the shield was lost just seven days later when Hawkes Bay defeated Otago at the Forsyth Barr Stadium in Dunedin. Otago conceded three tries to Hawkes Bay in the 28–9 loss despite dominating possession in the first half. Josh Ioane kicked three penalties which were the only points that Otago scored in the game.

== Bunnings National Provincial Championship (NPC) (2021 – Present) ==
=== 2024 National Provincial Championship season ===
Otago lost the opening game to Southland 22–13, then defeated Auckland 27–25 and Bay of Plenty 31–26 before losing to Taranaki 22–18, Canterbury 34–16 , Wellington 32–28 and Counties – Manakau 45–17. They then defeated Manawatu 28–10, Tasman 47–31 and Northland 31–28. This left Otago in 9th place at the end of the season.

=== 2025 Ranfurly Shield victory and Mitre 10 Cup Final ===
Otago won the Ranfurly shield in September 2025 in a close match-up in Christchurch defeating Canterbury 36 – 38. Otago had a difficult first half, only managing to score 2 tries to Canterbury's 4, leaving a half-time score of 24 – 14. In the second half, flanker Lucas Casey scored two tries which brought the score to trail Canterbury 36 – 31 with 18 minutes to go. Liam Coltman then scored the last try which was converted by Cam Millar to give the lead to Otago 38 – 36. Strong defense and ball possession helped Otago then prevent Canterbury scoring and with Otago taking the Ranfurly Shield.

The next week Otago defended the Ranfurly Shield against a North Harbour side who had yet to see a win in the season. Otago looked weaker in the first 20 minutes but managed to defeat North Harbour 41 – 26. The next defence will be in 2026.

The season continued for Otago, reaching the finals series and beating Waikato 44 – 41, with a last minute penalty by Cam Millar to progress to the Semi-final. In the Semi-final, Otago displayed a dominant second half display to defeat Bay of Plenty by 41 – 17 win to secure a final spot. Hawkes Bay was defeated by Canterbury 43 – 19. This denied Otago a home final. Otago made the trip up to Apollo Projects Stadium in Christchurch to face Canterbury in the final.

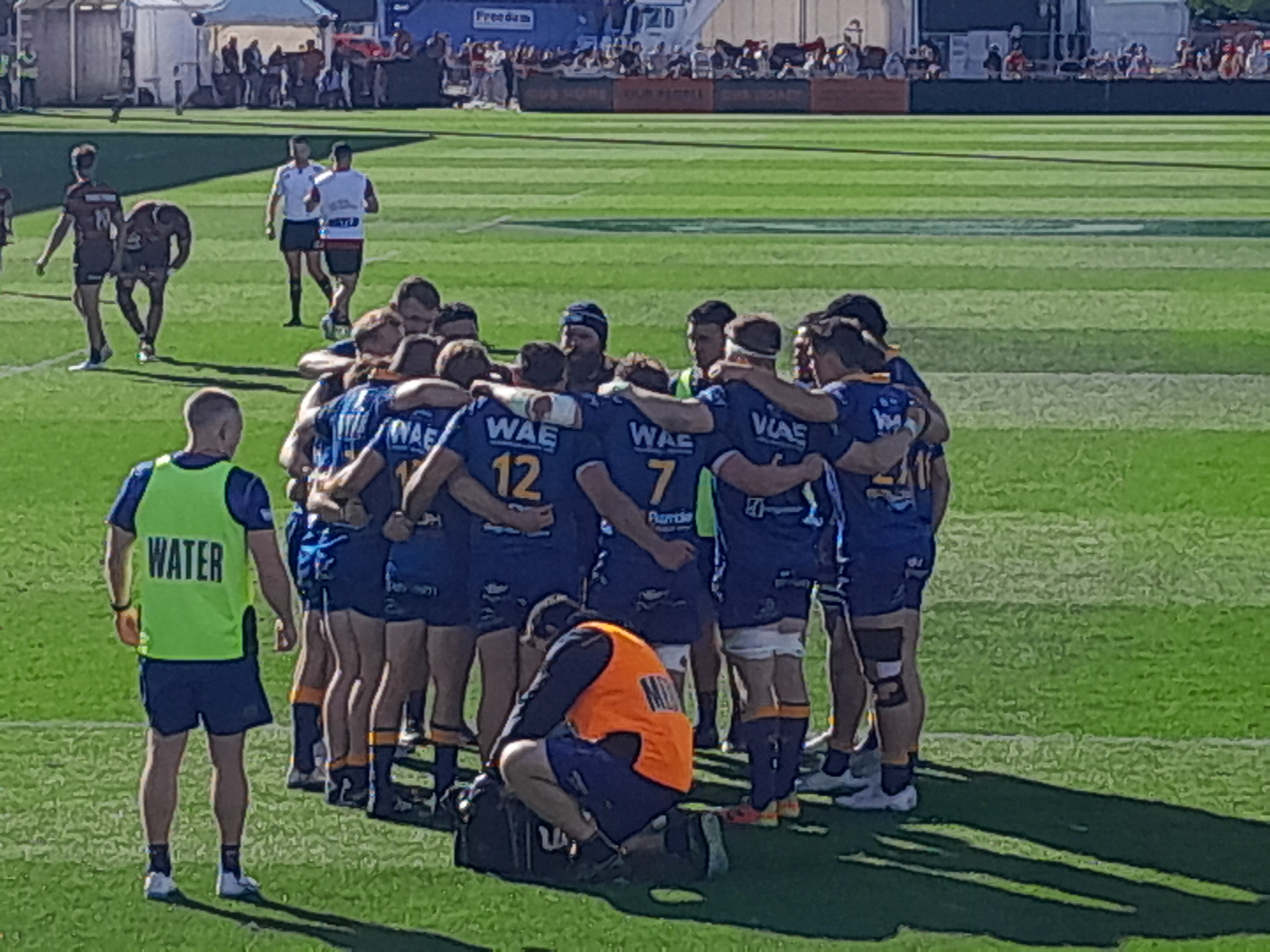
Otago Rugby team in the 2025 NPC final

Otago played with a strong wind behind them to hold a 14 – 10 lead at half time. A dominant second-half display by Canterbury denied Otago their first final win since 1998, with Otago losing 36 – 28. Otago however, had a very successful season in 2025 under head coach Mark Brown.

== Records and honours ==
=== Individual and team records ===
- Most points: 1520 — Greg Cooper
- Most tries: 73 — Paul Cooke
- Most points in season: 279 — Greg Cooper (1991)
- Most tries in season: 16 — John Timu (1988, 1990), Paul Cooke (1995), Brendan Laney (1998)
- Most conversions in season: 50 — Greg Cooper (1988)
- Most penalty goals in season: 54 — Greg Cooper (1989)
- Most drop goals in season: 9 — Lindsay Smith (1986)
- Most points in a match: 39 — Paul Turner (1986)
- Most individual tries in a match: 5 (by four players)
- Most conversions in a match: 14 — Paul Turner (1986)
- Most penalty goals in a match: 7 — Greg Cooper (1989, 1991), Blair Feeney (2002)
- Highest score: 91 — v East Coast (1986)
- Biggest winning margin: 85 — 88–3 v North Otago (1983)
- Biggest losing margin: 43 — 19–62 v Canterbury (2001)
- Most points against: 63 — v Auckland (1993)

=== 100+ matches ===
- Richard Knight, 1982–92, 170 games
- David Latta, 1986–96, 161 games
- Ken Bloxham, 1974–86, 155 games
- Steve Hotton, 1983–93, 146 games
- Lindsay Clark, 1967–78, 137 games
- Gordon Macpherson, 1985–93, 137 games
- John Leslie, 1991–98, 2004, 123 games
- Greg Cooper, 1984–96, 121 games
- John Haggart, 1983–91, 119 games
- Gary Seear, 1971–82, 116 games
- Stu Forster, 1990–98, 115 games
- Laurie Mains, 1967–75, 114 games
- Wayne Graham, 1976–86, 111 games
- Arran Pene, 1988–95, 111 games
- Dean Kenny, 1981–89, 110 games
- Paul Cooke, 1990–96, 107 games
- Rob Roy, 1969–79, 106 games
- Duncan Robertson, 1966–78, 104 games
- Merv Jaffray, 1971–78, 102 games
- Tuppy Diack, 1951–64, 101 games
- John Timu, 1988–94, 101 games
- Liam Coltman, 2010–22, 2024–25, 100 games

== Club rugby ==
Clubs within the union are split into two groups, Metro and Country.

=== Metro ===
The metro clubs include:

- Alhambra Union RFC
- Brighton RFC
- Dunedin RFC
- Eastern RFC
- Green Island RFC
- Harbour RFC
- Kaikorai RFC
- Pirates FC
- Southern RFC
- Taieri RFC
- University RFC
- West Taieri RFC
- Zingari – Richmond RFC

==== Dunedin club rugby premiership titles ====
Club champions
Year	Club	Year	Club	Year	Club	Year	Club
1885	Dunedin (1)	1886	Pirates (1)	1887	Union (1)	1888	Kaikorai (1)
1889	Kaikorai (2)	1890	Union (2)	1891	Alhambra (1)	1892	Alhambra (2)
1893	Kaikorai (3)	1894	Kaikorai (4)	1895	Kaikorai (5)	1896	Kaikorai (6)
1897	Kaikorai (7)	1898	Kaikorai (8)	1899	Kaikorai (9)	1900	Alhambra (3)
1901	Kaikorai (10)	1902	Alhambra (4)	1903	Alhambra (5)	1904	Southern (1)
1905	Alhambra (6)	1906	University (1)	1907	University (2)	1908	Dunedin (2)
1909	Alhambra (7)	1910	Alhambra (8)	1911	University (3)	1912	Southern (2)
1913	Zingari (1)	1914	Kaikorai (11)	1915	Southern (3)	1916	Union (3)
1917	University (4)	1918	Pirates (2)	1919	University (5)	1920	Alhambra (9)
1921	Kaikorai (12)	1922	University (6)	1923	University (7)	1924	University (8)
1925	Pirates (3)	1926	University (9)	1927	University (10)	1928	University (11)
1929	University (12)	1930	Alhambra (10)	1931	University (13)	1932	University (14)
1933	University (15)	1934	University (16)	1935	Southern (4)	1936	Southern (5)
1937	Southern (6)	1938	Southern (7)	1939	Union (4)	1940	NOT CONTESTED
1941	NOT CONTESTED	1942	NOT CONTESTED	1943	NOT CONTESTED	1944	NOT CONTESTED
1945	NOT CONTESTED	1946	University (17)	1947	Southern (8)	1948	Pirates (4)
1949	University (18)	1950	Pirates (5)	1951	Dunedin (3)	1952	Pirates (6)
1953	University (19)	1954	University (20)	1955	University (21)/ Taieri (1)	1956	University (22)
1957	University (23)	1958	University (24)/ Southern (9)	1959	Zingari-Richmond (1)	1960	Southern (10)
1961	Zingari-Richmond (2)	1962	University (25)	1963	Zingari-Richmond (3)	1964	University (26)
1965	University (27)	1966	University (28)	1967	University (29)	1968	Zingari-Richmond (4)
1969	Southern (11)	1970	University (30)	1971	University (31)	1972	Southern (12)
1973	Green Island (1)	1974	Green Island (2)	1975	Southern (13)	1976	University (32)
1977	Southern (14)	1978	Green Island (3)	1979	University (33)	1980	Southern (15)
1981	Southern (16)	1982	Southern (17)	1983	University (34)	1984	University (35)/ Southern (18)
1985	University (36)/ Southern (19)	1986	Dunedin (4)	1987	University (37)	1988	University (38)
1989	Southern (20)	1990	Dunedin (5)	1991	University (39)	1992	University (40)
1993	University (41)	1994	University (42)	1995	Dunedin (6)	1996	Dunedin (7)
1997	Kaikorai (13)	1998	Dunedin (8)	1999	University (43)	2000	University (44)
2001	University (45)	2002	Pirates (7)	2003	University (46)	2004	University (47)
2005	Dunedin (9)	2006	Alhambra-Union (1)	2007	Southern (21)	2008	Alhambra-Union (2)
2009	Dunedin (10)	2010	University (48)	2011	Taieri (2)	2012	Taieri (3)
2013	Dunedin (11)	2014	Taieri (4)	2015	University (49)	2016	Kaikorai (14)
2017	Southern (22)	2018	University (50)/ Harbour (1)	2019	University (51)	2020	Taieri (5)
2021	Taieri (6)	2022	Southern (23)	2023	Southern (24)	2024	Green Island (4)
2025	Kaikorai (15)	2026	Harbour (2)				

==== Recent metro club finals ====
- 2026 - Harbour 41-35 Kaikorai
- 2025 - Kaikorai 46-41 Harbour
- 2024 - Green Island 21-15 Dunedin
- 2023 - Southern 30-20 Dunedin
- 2022 - Southern 26-20 Taieri

==== Total Dunedin premiership titles by club ====
Titles by Club
Club	Total	Outright	Shared	Last title
University	51	46	5	2019
Southern	23	20	3	2022
Kaikorai	14	14	0	2025
Dunedin	11	11	0	2013
Alhambra	10	10	0	1930
Pirates	7	7	0	2002
Taieri	6	5	1	2021
Union	4	4	0	1939
Zingari-Richmond	4	4	0	1968
Green Island	4	4	0	2024
Alhambra-Union	2	2	0	2008
Harbour	2	0	2	2026
Zingari	1	1	0	1913

=== Country club rugby ===
The country clubs include:

- Alexandra RFC
- Arrowtown RFC
- Clinton RFC
- Clutha RFC
- Clutha Valley RFC
- Clyde Earnscleugh RFC
- Crescent RFC
- Cromwell RFC
- Heriot RFC
- Lawrence RFC
- Maniototo RFC
- Matakanui Combined RFC
- Owaka RFC
- Roxburgh RFC
- Strath Taieri RFC
- Tapanui RFC
- Telford RFC
- Toko RFC
- Upper Clutha RFC
- Wakatipu RFC

==== Recent Central club finals ====
- 2026 - Upper Clutha 17-14 Wakatipu
- 2025 - Upper Clutha 35-7 Wakatipu
- 2024 - Upper Clutha 46-10 Alexandra
- 2023 - Alexandra 32-24 Upper Clutha
- 2022 - Wakatipu 34-25 Cromwell

==== Recent Southern club finals ====
- 2026 - Clutha 27-11 West Taieri
- 2025 - Clutha 28-25 West Taieri
- 2024 - Clutha Valley 26-24 West Taieri
- 2023 - West Taieri 28-23 Clutha
- 2022 - Clutha Valley 9-5 Clutha

== Super Rugby ==
From the start of the Super Rugby competition in 1996, Otago was one of three unions (along with Southland and North Otago) to comprise the Highlanders, and Otago players traditionally formed the bulk of the Highlanders' playing squad.

This changed in 2010 with the move to direct-contracting for Super Rugby teams, meaning that Otago players are free to sign with any of the New Zealand-based teams. Despite this change, in the 2011 Super Rugby season all Otago players in the competition were still playing for the Highlanders. However, due to the recent struggles of Otago and an influx of players from other areas, Otago players no longer represent the majority of the Highlanders' playing personnel.
