= History of rugby union matches between Fiji and Wales =

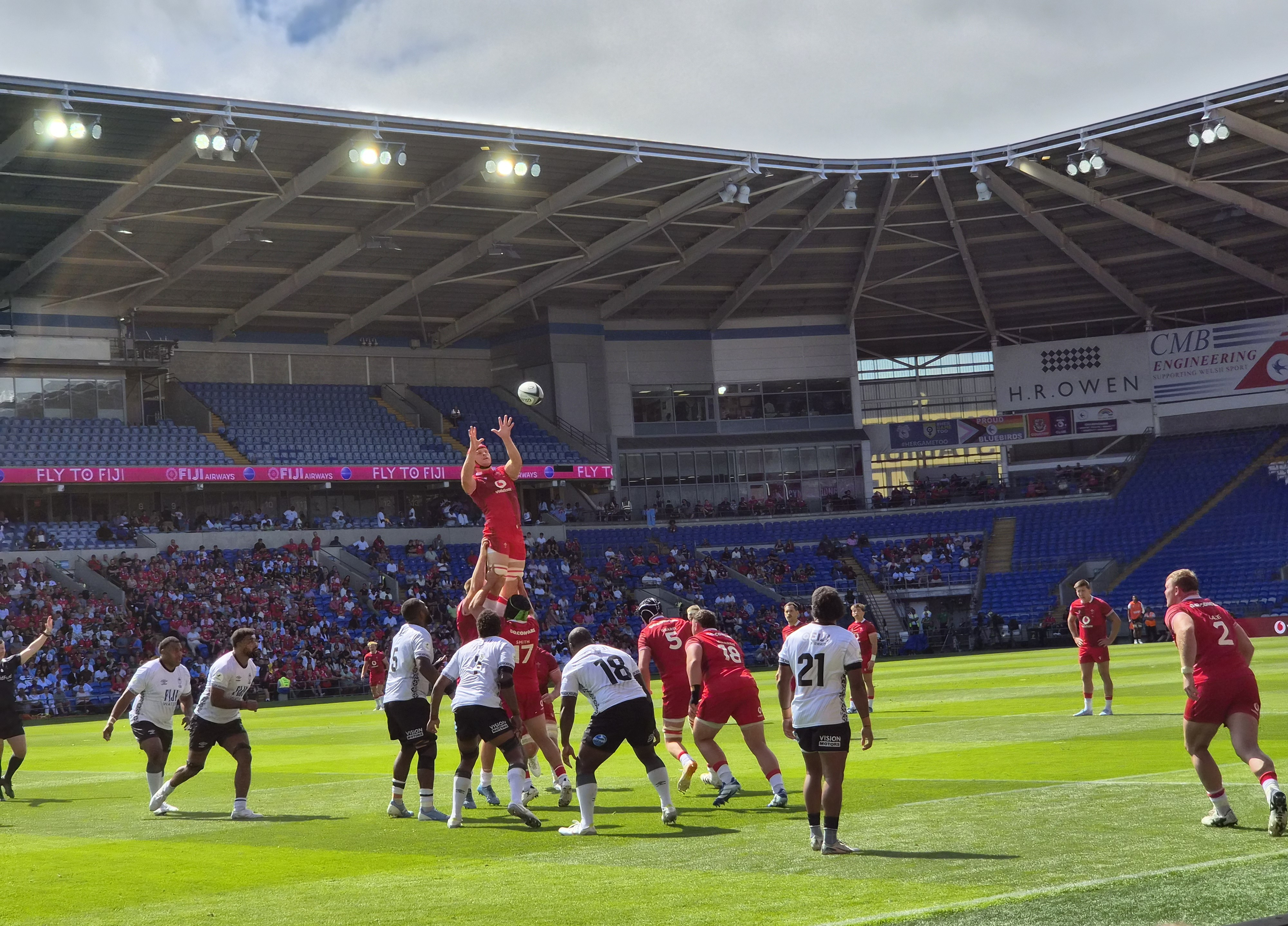
Lineout between Fiji and Wales in the 2026 Nations Championship

Fiji and Wales first met in an international rugby union in 1964. Their first Test match was two decades later in 1985. They have met over 15 times overall, five of which have been at the Rugby World Cup (RWC), meeting consecutively between 2007 and 2023.

Of the total matches played, Wales have won on 13 occasions, with Fiji winning two, and one draw between them.

Wales have won 12 of the 15 matches played, with Fiji winning two, and one draw. Fiji's win saw them qualify for the quarter-finals of the 2007 World Cup ahead of Wales, the last time Wales failed to qualify for the knockout stage of the competition.

== Summary ==
Note: Summary below reflects test results by both teams.

=== Overall ===
Details	Played	Won by Fiji	Won by Wales	Drawn	Fiji points	Wales points
In Fiji	2	0	2	0	23	45
In Wales	10	1	8	1	155	270
Neutral venue	4	1	3	0	81	161
Overall	16	2	13	1	259	486

=== Records ===
Note: Date shown in brackets indicates when the record was or last set.

Record	Fiji	Wales
Longest winning streak	1 (10 November 2024) (Note: Fiji have never beaten Wales in consecutive matches. However, their longest period of time following a win is 3 years, 51 days from 2007 to 2010.)	6 (9 November 1985 – 29 September 2007; 2 October 2011 – 10 September 2023)
Largest points for
Home	15 (31 May 1986)	58 (9 November 2002)
Away	38 (29 September 2007)	66 (2 October 2011)
Largest winning margin
Home	—N/a	44 (9 November 2002)
Away	5 (10 November 2024)	66 (2 October 2011)

== Results ==
No.	Date	Venue	Score	Winner	Competition	Ref.
1	9 November 1985	Cardiff Arms Park, Cardiff	40–3	Wales	1985 Fiji tour of Great Britain and Ireland	
2	31 May 1986	National Stadium, Suva	15–22	Wales	1986 Wales tour of Oceania	
3	18 June 1994	National Stadium, Suva	8–23	Wales	1994 Wales tour of Canada and Oceania	
4	11 November 1995	Cardiff Arms Park, Cardiff	19–15	Wales	1995 Fiji tour of Ireland and Wales	
5	9 November 2002	Millennium Stadium, Cardiff	58–14	Wales	2002 Fiji tour of Great Britain and Ireland	
6	11 November 2005	Millennium Stadium, Cardiff	11–10	Wales	2005 Autumn international	
7	29 September 2007	Stade de la Beaujoire, Nantes (France)	34–38	Fiji	2007 Rugby World Cup	
8	19 November 2010	Millennium Stadium, Cardiff	16–16	draw	2010 Autumn international	
9	2 October 2011	Waikato Stadium, Hamilton (New Zealand)	66–0	Wales	2011 Rugby World Cup	
10	15 November 2014	Millennium Stadium, Cardiff	17–13	Wales	2014 Autumn international	
11	1 October 2015	Millennium Stadium, Cardiff	23–13	Wales	2015 Rugby World Cup	
12	9 October 2019	Ōita Stadium, Ōita (Japan)	29–17	Wales	2019 Rugby World Cup	
13	14 November 2021	Millennium Stadium, Cardiff	38–23	Wales	2021 Autumn international	
14	10 September 2023	Matmut Atlantique, Bordeaux (France)	32–26	Wales	2023 Rugby World Cup	
15	10 November 2024	Millennium Stadium, Cardiff	19–24	Fiji	2024 Autumn international	
16	4 July 2026	Cardiff City Stadium, Cardiff (Note: Designated as a Fiji home game)	24–39	Wales	2026 Nations Championship	

== XV results ==
Below are a list of matches that Fiji has awarded Test status by virtue of awarding caps, but Wales did not award caps.

Date	Venue	Score	Winner	Notes	Ref.
26 September 1964	Cardiff Arms Park, Cardiff	28–22	Wales XV	Not classed as a full Test match by Wales who fielded a Wales XV	
25 June 1969	National Stadium, Suva	11–31	Wales XV	Not classed as a full Test match by Wales who fielded a Wales XV	
21 November 1970	Cardiff Arms Park, Cardiff	8–6	Wales U25	Not classed as a full Test match by Wales who fielded a Wales XV	

== Bibliography ==
- Billot, John (1971). History of Welsh International Rugby. Ron Jones Publications. ISBN 978-0951537916.
- Bond, Karen; Baille-Lane, Paul; Griffiths, John, eds. (2015). IRB World Rugby Yearbook 2016. Vision Sports Publishing. ISBN 978-1-909534-40-7.
- Cleary, Mick; Griffiths, John, eds. (1995). Rothmans Rugby Union Yearbook 1995–96. Headline Book Publishing. ISBN 0-7472-7816-4.
- Cleary, Mick; Griffiths, John, eds. (1996). Rothmans Rugby Union Yearbook 1996–97. Headline Book Publishing. ISBN 0-7472-7771-0.
- Griffiths, John; Cleary, Mick, eds. (2003). IRB International Rugby Yearbook 2003–04. HarperCollins. ISBN 0-00-714047-9.
- Jones, Stephen, ed. (1994). Rothmans Rugby Union Yearbook 1994–95. Headline Book Publishing. ISBN 0-7472-7850-4.
- Morgan, Paul; Griffiths, John, eds. (2010). IRB World Rugby Yearbook 2011. Vision Sports Publishing. ISBN 978-1905326-87-7.
- Morgan, Paul; Griffiths, John, eds. (2011). IRB World Rugby Yearbook 2012. Vision Sports Publishing. ISBN 978-1907637-25-4.
