= Otago (National Provincial Championship) =

NZ rugby union club, based in Otago

- ORFU official emblem
- Union: Otago Rugby Football Union
- Founded: 1881; 145 years ago
- Location: Dunedin Central, Dunedin, New Zealand
- Ground: Forsyth Barr Stadium (Capacity: 30,700)
- CEO: Richard Kinley
- Coach: Mark Brown
- Captain: TBA
- Most appearances: Richard Knight (170)
- Top scorer: Greg Cooper (1,520)
- Most tries: Paul Cooke (73)
- League: National Provincial Championship
- 2025: 2nd Runners-up
Team kit

Official website
- www.orfu.co.nz

Otago are a New Zealand professional rugby union team based in Dunedin, New Zealand. The union was originally established in 1881, with the National Provincial Championship established in 1976. They now play in the reformed National Provincial Championship competition. They play their home games at Forsyth Barr Stadium in Dunedin in the Otago region. The team is affiliated with the Highlanders Super Rugby franchise. Their home playing colours are navy blue and gold.

== Current squad ==
The Otago squad for the 2026 Hilux NPC season is:

2026 Otago squad
**Props**: (New Zealand) Cam Allan-McNeill ^{ST} (Note: Allan-McNeill wasn’t named in the original Otago squad, but was announced in the side for Round 7.); (New Zealand) **George Bower**; (New Zealand) Ben Lopas; (New Zealand) Saula Ma'u; (Australia) Marley Pearce (Note: Pearce was added to the squad – two weeks after the original team naming – as a replacement for Abraham Pole, who had to withdraw from the squad due to signing an overseas' contract.); (Samoa) **Aki Seiuli** ^{ST} (Note: Seiuli wasn't named in the original Otago squad, but was announced as a late signing in August 2026.); (New Zealand) Moana Takataka; (New Zealand) Rohan Wingham; **Hookers**: (New Zealand) Henry Bell; (New Zealand) **Liam Coltman**; (New Zealand) A-One Lolofie; (New Zealand) Nic Souchon ^{WTG}; **Locks**: (New Zealand) **Fabian Holland**; (New Zealand) Harry Irving; (New Zealand) Will Stodart; (Fiji) **Joseva Tamani**; (New Zealand) Mitchell Tinnock ^{WTG}	**Loose forwards**: (New Zealand) Lucas Casey; (New Zealand) Charles Elton ^{ST} (Note: Elton wasn't named in the original Otago squad, but was announced in the side for Round 2.); (New Zealand) Oliver Haig; (New Zealand) **Christian Lio-Willie**; (New Zealand) Cody Lokotui ^{WTG}; (New Zealand) Slade McDowall; **Halfbacks (scrum-halves)**: (Samoa) **Joel Lam**; (New Zealand) Kieran McClea; (New Zealand) Mackenzie Palmer ^{WTG}; (New Zealand) Dylan Pledger (injured); (New Zealand) Oliver Thode ^{WTG}; **First five-eighths (fly-halves)**: (New Zealand) Max Hore ^{ST} (Note: Hore wasn't named in the original Otago squad, but was announced as a late inclusion in the side for Round 9.); (New Zealand) Cam Millar; (Tonga) **Patrick Pellegrini**	**Midfielders (centres)**: (New Zealand) Jake Fowler ^{WTG}; (New Zealand) Riley Lucas ^{WTG}; (New Zealand) Jake Te Hiwi; (New Zealand) Josh Timu; (New Zealand) Josh Whaanga; **Outside backs**: (New Zealand) Charlie Breen ^{WTG}; (New Zealand) Jae Broomfield; (New Zealand) Finn Hurley; (New Zealand) Jona Nareki; (New Zealand) Sam Nemec-Vial
**(c)** denotes the team captain. **Bold** denotes internationally capped players.^{ST} denotes a short-term signing.^{WTG} denotes a wider training group member. denotes an injured player. Source:

== Honours ==
Otago have been overall Champions twice, winning the titles in 1991 and 1998. Their full list of honours include:

National Provincial Championship First Division

- Winners: 1991, 1998

== Current Super Rugby players ==
Players named in the 2025 Otago squad, who also earned contracts or were named in a squad for any side participating in the 2025 Super Rugby Pacific season.

Player	Team
Henry Bell	Highlanders
George Bower	Crusaders
Sam Gilbert	Highlanders
Oliver Haig	Highlanders
Nathan Hastie	Highlanders
Fabian Holland	Highlanders
Finn Hurley	Highlanders
Christian Lio-Willie	Crusaders
Saula Ma'u	Highlanders
Cam Millar	Highlanders
Jona Nareki	Highlanders
Abraham Pole	Moana Pasifika
Will Stodart	Highlanders
Joseva Tamani	Drua
Jake Te Hiwi	Highlanders
Will Tucker	Hurricanes
Thomas Umaga-Jensen	Highlanders
Josh Whaanga	Highlanders
Rohan Wingham	Highlanders
