= William Goodsir =

- Born: William Goodsir; 12 January 1902 Taumarunui, New Zealand
- Died: 14 July 1958 (aged 56) Suva, Fiji
- Occupation: Businessman

Rugby union career
Coaching career
- Years: Team
- 1954: Fiji

William Ernest Goodsir (12 January 1902 – 14 July 1958) was a New Zealand-born businessman, politician and rugby coach in Fiji.

== Biography ==
Born in Taumarunui, Goodsir moved to Fiji in 1924. He worked in the timber industry, establishing the Nadarivatu Timber Company in 1949 and the Kandavu Timber Company in 1957. Taking an interest in politics, Goodsir was elected to Suva Council in 1952 and was appointed Deputy Mayor. He remained on the council until 1957.

Goodsir had been an excellent rugby union player in his youth. In the 1950s he coached the Fiji national rugby union team, leading it on the 1954 tour of Australia.

He died in Suva in July 1958.
