= Oliver Haig =

New Zealand rugby union player

- Born: 3 January 2002 (age 24) Perth, Australia
- Height: 196 cm (6 ft 5 in)
- Weight: 115 kg (254 lb)
- School: Otago Boys High School

Rugby union career
- Position: Flanker
- Current team: Highlanders, Otago
Senior career
| Years | Team | Apps | (Points) |
| 2022– | Otago | 12 | (20) |
| 2023– | Highlanders | 12 | (0) |
- Correct as of 16 August 2023
International career
| Years | Team | Apps | (Points) |
| 2022 | New Zealand Under 20 | 3 | (5) |

Oliver Haig (born 3 January 2002) is a New Zealand rugby union player, who plays for the Highlanders and Otago. His preferred position is flanker.

== Early career ==
Haig attended Otago Boys' High School and represented New Zealand U20 in 2022, with his appearances earning him a contract for both Otago and the Highlanders.

== Professional career ==
Haig debuted for Otago in 2022, and was called into the Highlanders squad as a late replacement ahead of Round 4 of the 2023 Super Rugby Pacific season, debuting against the Force. He was again announced in the Otago side for the 2023 Bunnings NPC.
