= Dean Kenny =

New Zealand rugby union player

- Born: Dean Julian Kenny; 22 May 1961 (age 65) Woodville, New Zealand
- Height: 1.79 m (5 ft 10 in)
- Weight: 79 kg (174 lb)
- School: Palmerston North Boys' High School
- University: Palmer College of Chiropractic
- Occupation: Chiropractor

Rugby union career
- Position: Halfback
Senior career
Years	Team	Apps	(Points)
1997	Sale Sharks	1	(0)
Provincial / State sides
Years	Team	Apps	(Points)
1981–89	Otago	110	
International career
Years	Team	Apps	(Points)
1986	New Zealand	0	(0)
–	New Zealand Māori		

Dean Julian Kenny (born 22 May 1961) is a former New Zealand rugby union player. A halfback, Kenny represented Otago at a provincial level, and was a member of the New Zealand national side, the All Blacks, in 1986. He played three matches for the All Blacks on their tour of France that year, but did not play in any tests.

Dean Kenny qualified as a chiropractor but lost his registration in 2018 after facing charges in the North Shore District Court. These charges relating to false treatment claims made to ACC between March and July 2016.
