= Clovelly, New South Wales =

Clovelly
- Suburb
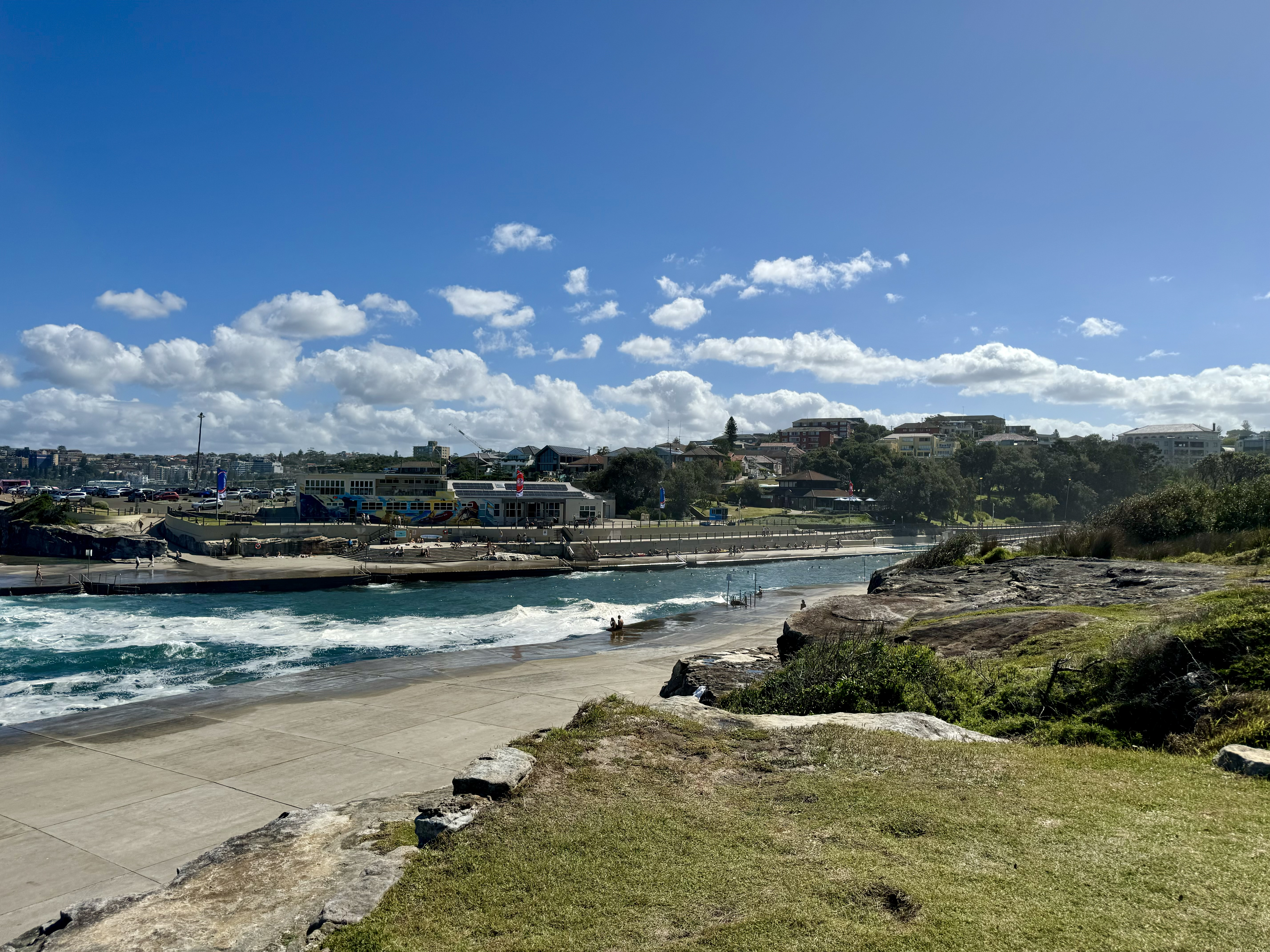
- Clovelly, New South Wales

- Interactive map of Clovelly
- Country: Australia
- State: New South Wales
- City: Sydney
- LGA: City of Randwick
- Location: 8 km (5.0 mi) south-east of Sydney CBD

Government
  - State electorate: Coogee
  - Federal division: Wentworth

Population
  - Total: 4,887 (2021 census)
- Postcode: 2031
Suburbs around Clovelly
Queens Park	Bronte
Randwick	Clovelly	Tasman Sea
Coogee	Coogee

Clovelly is a small beach-side suburb in Sydney's Eastern Suburbs, in the state of New South Wales, Australia. Clovelly is located 8 kilometres south-east of the Sydney central business district.

Clovelly is a mainly residential suburb on Clovelly Bay. Clovelly Beach is a small beach that sits on the end of the narrow bay. The bay is popular with swimmers. The bay is home to one of the first surf lifesaving clubs in the world, Clovelly Surf Life Saving Club, which was founded in 1906.

== History ==
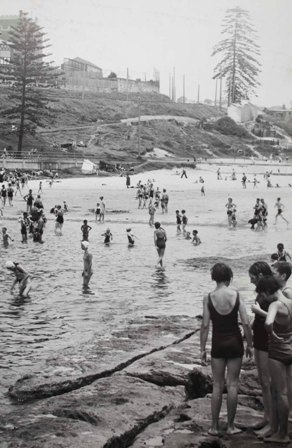
Clovelly Cove beach.

Originally known as Little Coogee, the name was changed to Clovelly in 1913. When the search for a new name began, the English seaside town Eastbourne was suggested. The president of the local progress association, Mr. F. H. Howe, suggested Clovelly, the name of a local estate owned by Sir John Robertson, which was named after the village of Clovelly on the north Devon coast, England.

William C. Greville bought 8 hectares (20 acres), which included the whole bay frontage, for 40 pounds in 1834. The area was dominated during the nineteenth century by the grand estate of Mundarrah Towers. Mundarrah Towers was built for Dr Dickson in the 1860s. Samuel Bennett, who owned Australian Town and Country Journal, one of the most influential newspapers of the day, bought the property and made further grand additions. The Mundarrah Towers estate occupied the land around Burnie Street overlooking the western end of Clovelly Bay. Mundarrah Street honours this once grand part of Clovelly's heritage. Between Coogee and Clovelly, on the shores of Gordon's Bay, stood Cliffbrook, the home built for John Thompson. By the early twentieth century the first governor of the Commonwealth Bank owned this grand mansion which was substantially demolished in 1976. Some of the buildings of the Cliffbrook estate survive today at the corner of Beach and Battery streets.

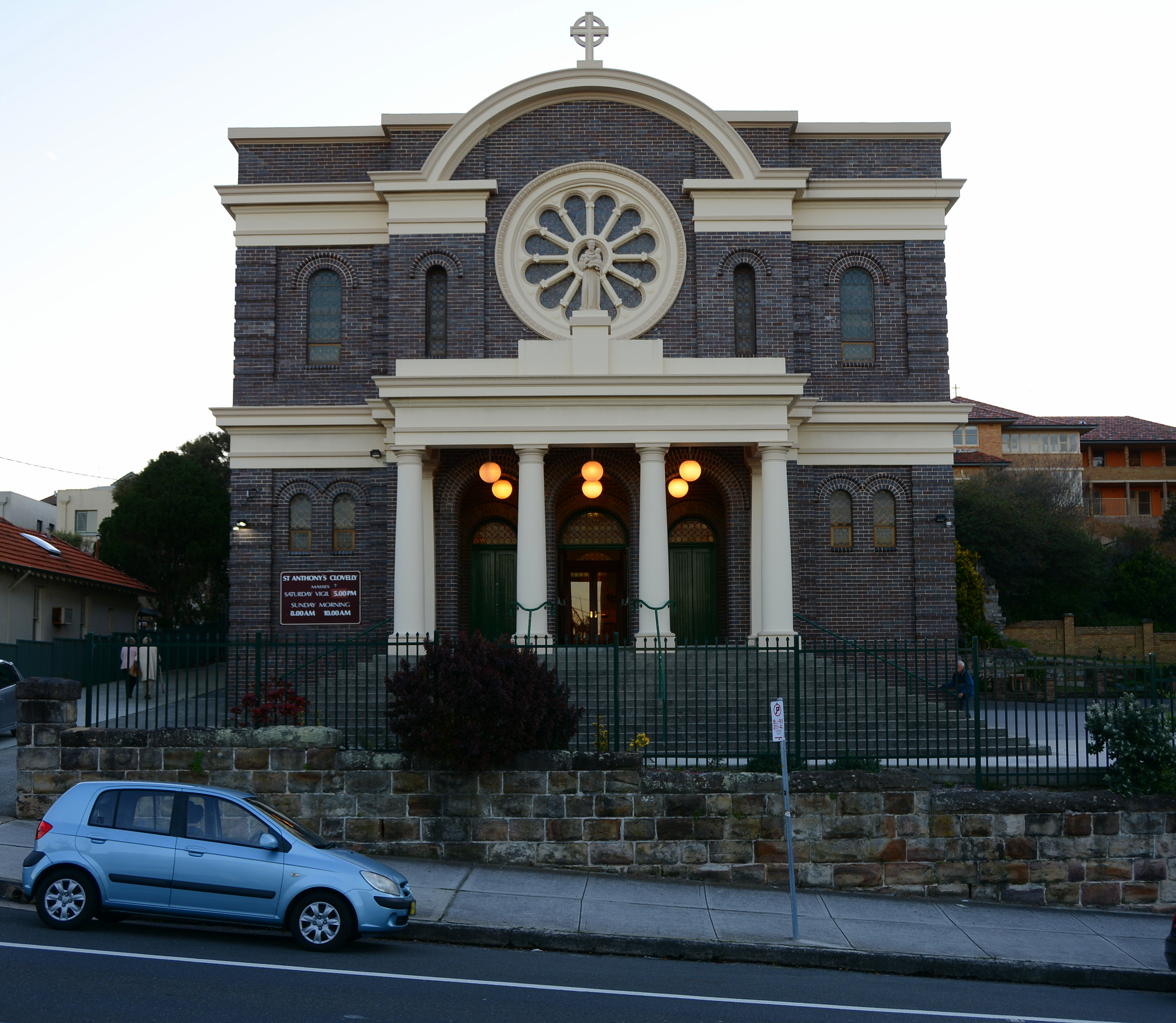
St Anthony's Parish

Today the suburb is affectionately referred to as "Cloey" by many residents and locals.

=== Trams ===
The Clovelly tram line began at Alison Road to the intersection of Clovelly and Carrington Roads in 1912, then extending to Clovelly in 1913 helping to popularise the area. This line branched from Anzac Parade at Alison Road, and ran on its own tram reservation beside Centennial Park as far as Darley Road. Here it diverged from services to Coogee, to run north along Darley Road, then turned right into Clovelly Road to run down to its terminus at Clovelly Beach. Though services ran from Circular Quay and from Railway Square (from 1923), the line closed in 1957. The tram line followed the route of Transdev John Holland bus route 339.

== Commercial area ==
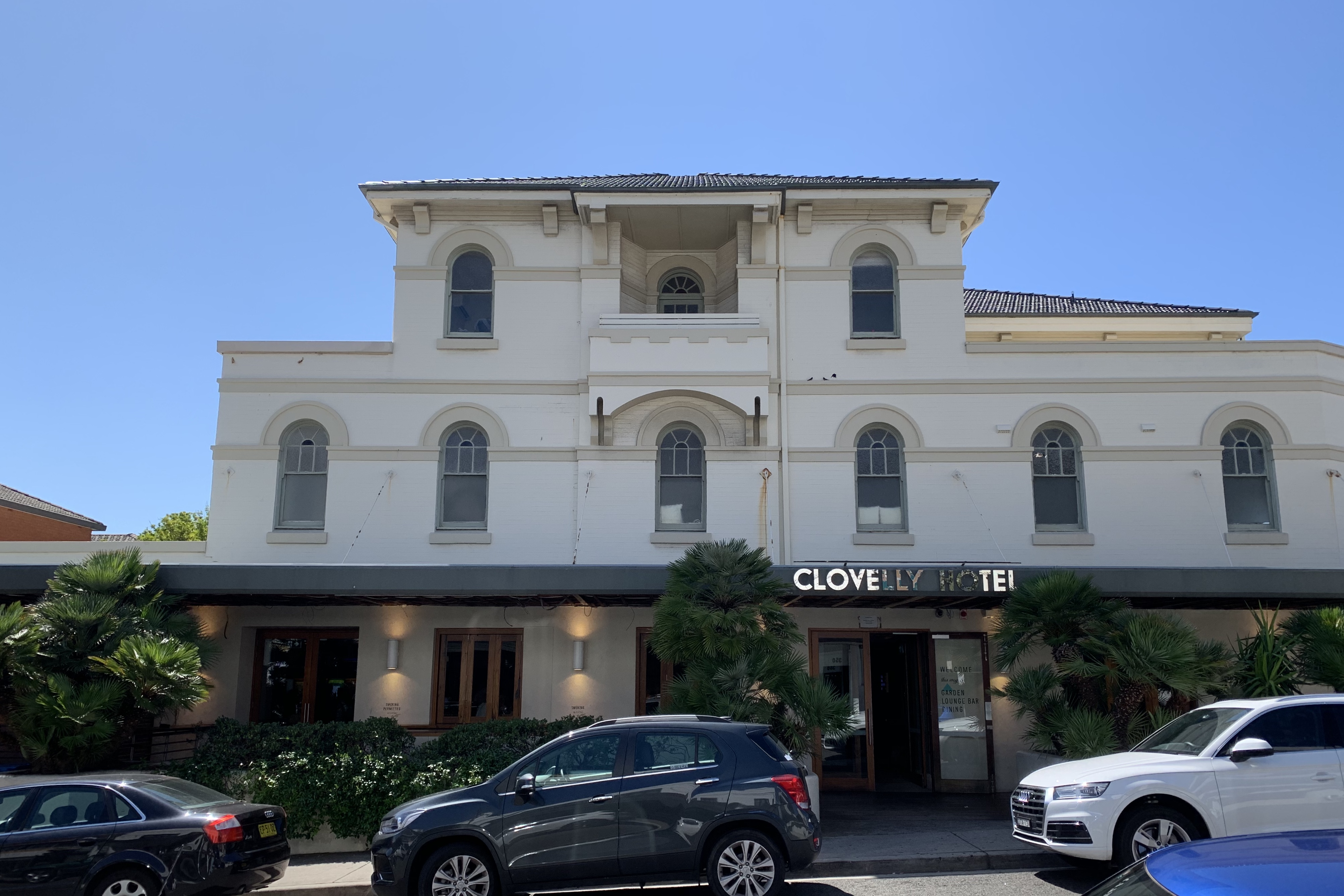
Clovelly Hotel

Clovelly has four small shopping precincts all on or near Clovelly Road. The largest is at the corner of Fern St and Clovelly where there are (amongst other businesses) a post office, community bank, chemist, newsagent and bottle shop. At the corner of Arden St and Clovelly Road is another small precinct including coffee shops, eateries, a general store & bottle shop. At the corner of Carrington and Clovelly Road there are a handful of shops. Close to Clovelly Beach there are shops in a small precinct where Burnie St meets Clovelly Road.

There is one beachside hotel, the Clovelly Hotel, built on some of the land once occupied by the Mundarrah Towers estate and the Clovelly Bowling Club, with coastal views and located on leased public land bordering the Waverley Cemetery.

== Schools ==
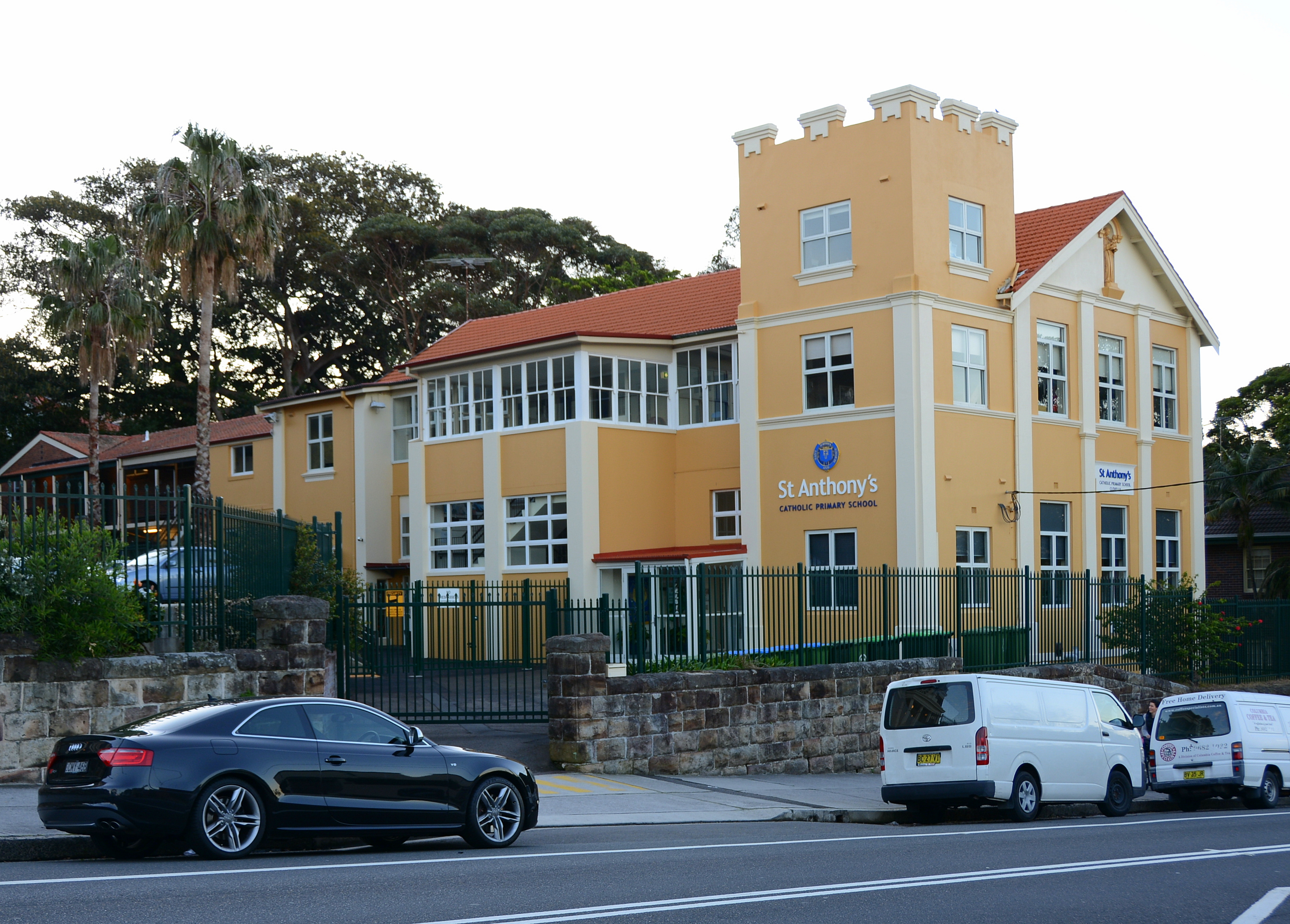
St Anthony's Catholic Primary School

- Clovelly Public School (although technically, it is located in the suburb of Waverley)
- St Anthony's Catholic Systemic Primary School, Clovelly

== Sport and recreation ==
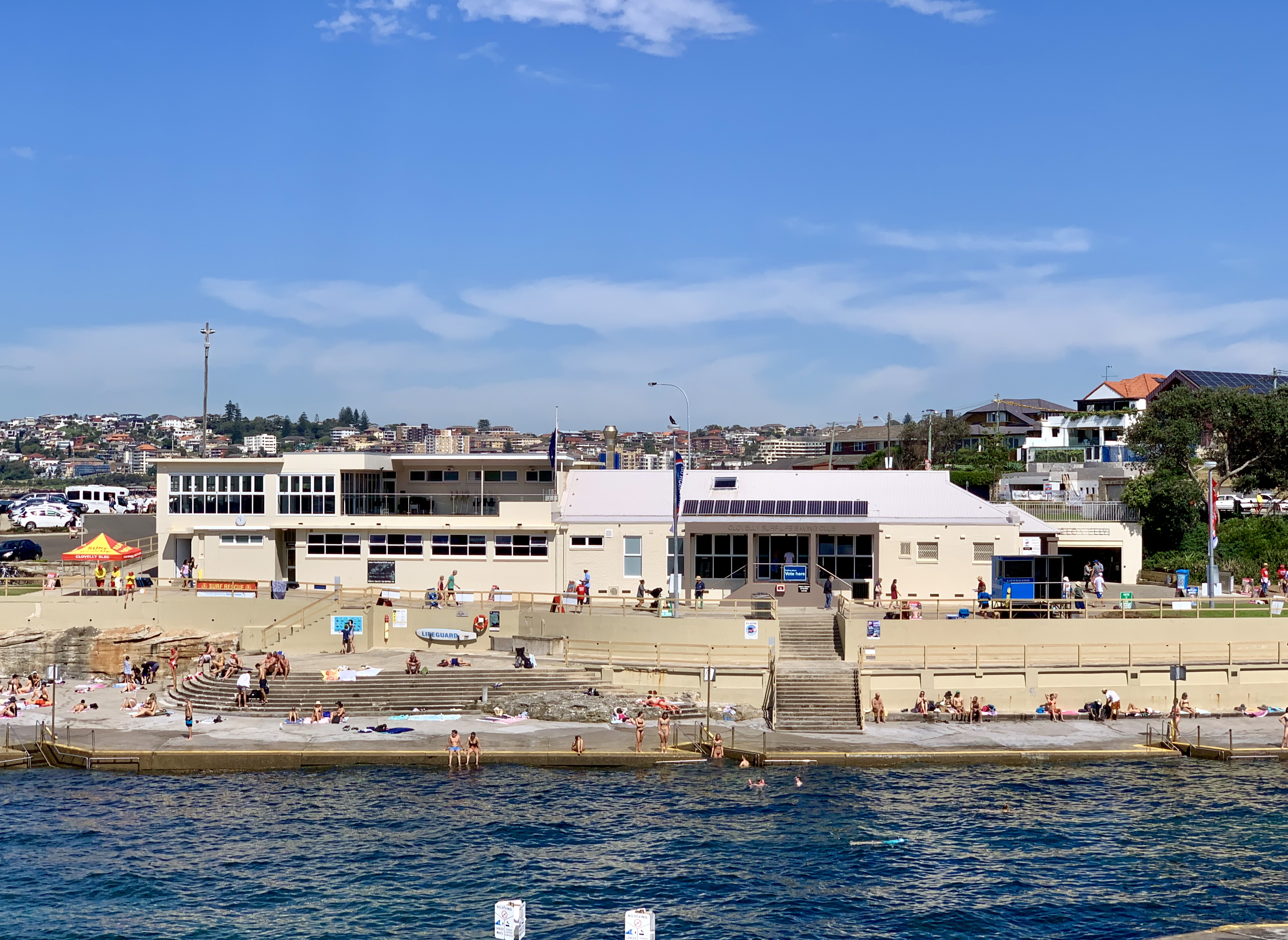
Clovelly Surf Life Saving Club

In summer, Clovelly Beach is a centre of community activity patrolled by council lifeguards on weekdays and Clovelly Surf Life Saving Club members on weekends/public holidays. In 2006, there were over 200 proficient club members rostered into 13 active patrols.

In winter, the Clovelly Crocodiles field over 20 junior rugby league sides in the Sydney Roosters Juniors competition and their home ground is Burrows Park. The Clovelly Eagles in 2006 fielded 18 junior rugby union sides in the Randwick/Easts Junior division.

The Clovelly Eskimos Winter Swimming Club compete against Bondi Icebergs Winter Swimming Club, South Maroubra Dolphins Winter Swimming Club, Cronulla Polar Bears Winter Swimming Club, Maroubra Seals Winter Swimming Club, Coolangatta Surf Life Saving Club, Coogee Penguins Winter Swimming Club, Bronte Splashers, Wollongong Whales and Cottesloe Crabs in the Winter Swimming Association of Australia Championships

Lawn bowls and bocce can be played at Clovelly Bowling Club, which is situated on a clifftop with a scenic backdrop.

== Demographics ==
Historical population
Year	Pop.	±%
2001	4,359	—
2006	4,426	+1.5%
2011	4,581	+3.5%
2016	4,736	+3.4%
2021	4,887	+3.2%

In the 2021 census, Clovelly had a population of 4,887 people. 69.1% of people were born in Australia. The next most common countries of birth were England 8.0% and New Zealand 2.6%. 85.6% of people spoke only English at home. The most common responses for religion were No Religion 49.5%, Catholic 22.0% and Anglican 9.7%. Clovelly's housing is higher density than much of Australia with 72.6% of dwellings being units, flats, semi-detached, terrace houses or townhouses. The national average for these housing types is 26.8%.

== Notable people ==
- Clare Dennis (1916–1971), gold medallist in the 200m breaststroke at the 1932 Summer Olympics
- Don Furness, rugby union player
- David Gallop, former CEO of the National Rugby League
- Sel Lisle, rugby league player
- Willie Mason, rugby league player
- Dane Rampe. Australian rules player
- Luke Ricketson, rugby league player
- Peter Ruehl (1947–2011), American newspaper columnist
- Justine Schofield, cook and television presenter
- David Walker, Catholic bishop
