= David Latta (rugby union) =

Rugby union player

David Eric Latta is a New Zealand rugby player. He played for the Otago rugby team between 1986 and 1996, playing a total of 161 games for them. He captained the Otago team in 1993 and 1994. He played for the Highlanders in 1996 before retiring. Known as "Crazy", He was part of the Otago team that won the National Provincial Championship in 1991, defeated the British and Irish Lions in 1993 and defeated the Springboks in 1994.

David Latta was part of the Otago team that played Canterbury for the Ranfurly Shield in 1994. With two minutes left in the game before full time, Otago was leading 20–19. David Latta was penalized for being off side at a ruck. Andrew Mehrtens kicked a penalty to give Canterbury the win. It was suggested that the penalty should never have been given, however the referee Colin Hawke, did not have the advantage of video replays during the game.
