= Rohan Wingham =

New Zealand rugby union player

- Born: 4 November 2002 (age 24) New Zealand
- Height: 189 cm (6 ft 2 in)
- Weight: 122 kg (269 lb; 19 st 3 lb)

Rugby union career
- Position: Prop
- Current team: Highlanders, Otago
Senior career
Years	Team	Apps	(Points)
2023–	Otago	9	(0)
2024–	Highlanders		
- Correct as of 28 January 2024

Rohan Wingham (born 4 November 2002) is a New Zealand rugby union player, who plays for the Highlanders and Otago. His preferred position is prop.

== Early career ==
Wingham attended King's High School, Dunedin where he played rugby, representing the New Zealand Barbarian U18 side and New Zealand Schools. He represented the Highlanders U20 side in 2021.

== Professional career ==
Wingham has represented Otago in the National Provincial Championship since 2023, being named in their full squad for the 2023 Bunnings NPC. He originally wasn't named in the Highlanders squad for the 2024 Super Rugby Pacific season, being named in the Highlanders development squad, but was announced as a replacement signing in January 2024.
