= A-One Lolofie =

New Zealand rugby union player

- Born: 25 March 2004 (age 22) New Zealand
- Height: 180 cm (5 ft 11 in)
- Weight: 105 kg (231 lb; 16 st 7 lb)
- School: Hastings Boys' High School

Rugby union career
- Position: Hooker
- Current team: Highlanders, Otago
Senior career
Years	Team	Apps	(Points)
2025–	Otago	2	(5)
2026–	Highlanders		
- Correct as of 16 November 2025
International career
Years	Team	Apps	(Points)
2024	New Zealand U20	4	(5)
- Correct as of 16 November 2025

A-One Lolofie (born 25 March 2004) is a New Zealand rugby union player, who plays for the Highlanders and Otago. His preferred position is hooker.

== Early career ==
Lolofie grew up in Hastings and attended Hastings Boys' High School where he played rugby for the first XV. His performances for the school earned him selection for the New Zealand Schools side in 2022. After leaving school he first joined up with the Hurricanes academy, representing their U18 side in 2022, before joining up with the Highlanders, representing their U20 side in 2023 and 2024. In 2024 he was named in the New Zealand U20 side.

== Professional career ==
Lolofie has represented Otago in the National Provincial Championship since 2025, being named in the squad for the 2025 Bunnings NPC. He was named in the Highlanders wider training group for the 2026 Super Rugby Pacific season.
