= Richard Knight (rugby union) =

New Zealand rugby union player

Richard John Knight played rugby union for Otago between 1982 and 1992. He played as a lock. He holds the record for the most games played for Otago at 170. He scored six tries for Otago. He said, jokingly of his tries, that Otago coach Laurie Mains "used to give him a rocket for not doing the hard stuff" whenever he scored a try

He also played for the South Island and the Possibles in 1986 but missed out on making the All Blacks that year. He played in the Otago team that won the 1991 National Provincial Championship.
