= Steve Hotton =

New Zealand rugby union player

Stephen Edward Hotton is a former Otago rugby player who played 146 games for Otago between 1983 and 1993. He played in the front row as a prop. He played seven games for the New Zealand Māori rugby team in 1988. He was a cult hero at home games at Carisbrook with the Steve Hotton Fan Club cheering him on. He was a member of the 1991 Otago team which won the first division championship. Mike Brewer said that he was a "very important player to Otago...he was crucial in letting me know what was really happening up front" and that he "was regarded as the team clown...it was in his nature to crack a joke when things were getting too tense".

Steve Hotton has a proud memory of being part of the Otago team that beat Manawatu. The Manawatu team contained Gary Knight, Mark Shaw, Frank Oliver and Mark Donaldson. He said of the game: "We were pretty young and inexperienced and they had those All Blacks. Those are the sort of things you remember".

After retiring from rugby, Hotton moved to Kurow where he ran a cafe and a butchery.
