= Don Furness (rugby union) =

- Born: Donald Charles Furness; 11 April 1921 Clovelly, New South Wales
- Died: c. 1993

Rugby union career
- Position: hooker
International career
Years	Team	Apps	(Points)
1946	Wallabies	1	(0)

Donald Charles Furness (11 April 1921 – c. 1993) was a rugby union player who represented Australia.

Furness, a hooker, was born in Clovelly, New South Wales and claimed 1 international rugby cap for Australia.
