= List of Fiji national rugby union players =

List of Fiji national rugby union players is a list of people who have played for the Fiji national rugby union team. The list only includes players who have played in a test match.

Note that the "position" column lists the position at which the player made his Test debut, not necessarily the position for which he is best known. A position in parentheses indicates that the player debuted as a substitute.

== List ==
Fiji's international rugby capped players
Number	Name	Position	Date first cap obtained	Opposition
1	Apimeleki Amaraki		18 August 1924	v Samoa at Apia
2	Kuruka Bogiwalu		18 August 1924	v Samoa at Apia
3	Viliame Devo		18 August 1924	v Samoa at Apia
4	Esava Kobiti		18 August 1924	v Samoa at Apia
5	Jioji Koroibanuve		18 August 1924	v Samoa at Apia
6	Samisoni Koroitamudu		18 August 1924	v Samoa at Apia
7	Atunaisa Laqeretabua		18 August 1924	v Samoa at Apia
8	Filimone Masivulo		18 August 1924	v Samoa at Apia
9	Lepani Matea		18 August 1924	v Samoa at Apia
10	Fereti Naceba		18 August 1924	v Samoa at Apia
11	Sairusi Natuna		18 August 1924	v Samoa at Apia
12	Aloesi Qio		18 August 1924	v Samoa at Apia
13	Lepani Tamani		18 August 1924	v Samoa at Apia
14	Savenaca Tamaibeka		18 August 1924	v Samoa at Apia
15	Isikeli Taukei		18 August 1924	v Samoa at Apia
16	Kemueli Tolili		18 August 1924	v Samoa at Apia
17	Nalovu Tubutubu		18 August 1924	v Samoa at Apia
18	Solomone Tuicakau		18 August 1924	v Samoa at Apia
19	Ilaisa Tulele		18 August 1924	v Samoa at Apia
20	Ulaiasi Vosabalavu		18 August 1924	v Samoa at Apia
21	Kitione Kida	fly-half	14 August 1926	v Tonga at Suva
22	Rafaele Kuruisiga	lock	14 August 1926	v Tonga at Suva
23	Osea Nabavu	scrum-half	14 August 1926	v Tonga at Suva
24	Kinivuai Nabili	wing	14 August 1926	v Tonga at Suva
25	Apenisa Nayacalagilagi	centre	14 August 1926	v Tonga at Suva
26	Saimone Rabici	prop	14 August 1926	v Tonga at Suva
27	Pita Ravaga	hooker	14 August 1926	v Tonga at Suva
28	Manasa Seniloli	centre	14 August 1926	v Tonga at Suva
29	Taniela Uluiviti	lock	14 August 1926	v Tonga at Suva
30	Semi Vakarua	flanker	14 August 1926	v Tonga at Suva
31	Jese Baleiwei		14 August 1926	v Tonga at Suva
32	Tevita Seniloli	(replacement)	14 August 1926	v Tonga at Suva
33	Mr Delana	flanker	16 August 1926	v Tonga at Suva
34	Mr Livai	lock	18 August 1926	v Tonga at Suva
35	Poasa Waqa	prop	18 August 1926	v Tonga at Suva
36	Josefa Bibi		25 August 1928	v Tonga at Nuku A'lofa
37	Isikeli Cawa		25 August 1928	v Tonga at Nuku A'lofa
38	Avaiata Durusolo		25 August 1928	v Tonga at Nuku A'lofa
39	Anare Mara		25 August 1928	v Tonga at Nuku A'lofa
40	Saimone Matasarasara		25 August 1928	v Tonga at Nuku A'lofa
41	Joeli Ravai		25 August 1928	v Tonga at Nuku A'lofa
42	Manasa Ravai		25 August 1928	v Tonga at Nuku A'lofa
43	Epeli Ravouvou		25 August 1928	v Tonga at Nuku A'lofa
44	Veresi Taliqa		25 August 1928	v Tonga at Nuku A'lofa
45	Jo Waqa	no. 8	21 September 1928	v Samoa at Apia
46	Asela Batikaciwa	scrum-half	27 August 1932	v Tonga at Suva
47	Aseri Bose	prop	27 August 1932	v Tonga at Suva
48	Vula Daunibau	no. 8	27 August 1932	v Tonga at Suva
49	Isikeli Daveta	wing	27 August 1932	v Tonga at Suva
50	Alifereti Koroi	wing	27 August 1932	v Tonga at Suva
51	Akuila Matanibukaca	prop	27 August 1932	v Tonga at Suva
52	Sakeasi Rabitu	flanker	27 August 1932	v Tonga at Suva
53	Joape Suluaqalo	hooker	27 August 1932	v Tonga at Suva
54	Sunia Tubuna	fullback	27 August 1932	v Tonga at Suva
55	Peni Tuidraki	fly-half	27 August 1932	v Tonga at Suva
56	Vilitati Vavaitamana	lock	27 August 1932	v Tonga at Suva
57	Samu Baravilala	fly-half	8 August 1934	v Tonga at Nuku A'lofa
58	Sairusi Bola	lock	8 August 1934	v Tonga at Nuku A'lofa
59	Isoa Gavidi	fullback	8 August 1934	v Tonga at Nuku A'lofa
60	Seru Ralawa	wing	8 August 1934	v Tonga at Nuku A'lofa
61	Raiwalui Seniloli	prop	8 August 1934	v Tonga at Nuku A'lofa
62	Eroni Vavaitamana	flanker	8 August 1934	v Tonga at Nuku A'lofa
63	Vilisi Nadaku	lock	12 August 1934	v Tonga at Nuku A'lofa
64	Jone Wesele	scrum-half	12 August 1934	v Tonga at Nuku A'lofa
65	Peni Sailasa	(replacement)	15 August 1934	v Tonga at Nuku A'lofa
66	Ratu Dovi	fly-half	20 August 1938	v New Zealand Maori at Suva
67	Atunaisa Kororua	scrum-half	20 August 1938	v New Zealand Maori at Suva
68	Vetaia Naisoro	prop	20 August 1938	v New Zealand Maori at Suva
69	Solomone Qurai	flanker	20 August 1938	v New Zealand Maori at Suva
70	Ulaiasi Radike	centre	20 August 1938	v New Zealand Maori at Suva
71	Apakuki Tuitavua	flanker	20 August 1938	v New Zealand Maori at Suva
72	Esava Vavaitamana	prop	20 August 1938	v New Zealand Maori at Suva
73	Josaia Voreqe	wing	20 August 1938	v New Zealand Maori at Suva
74	Tomasi Vosaicake	hooker	20 August 1938	v New Zealand Maori at Suva
75	Isireli Korovulavula	fullback	24 August 1938	v New Zealand Maori at Suva
76	Isimeli Wea	lock	27 August 1938	v New Zealand Maori at Suva
77	Epeli Bola	wing	16 September 1939	v New Zealand Maori at Hamilton
78	George Cakobau	centre	16 September 1939	v New Zealand Maori at Hamilton
79	Penaia Ganilau	flanker	16 September 1939	v New Zealand Maori at Hamilton
80	Peni Lagilagi	flanker	16 September 1939	v New Zealand Maori at Hamilton
81	Vereniki Loba	prop	16 September 1939	v New Zealand Maori at Hamilton
82	Inoke Nagatalevu	fly-half	16 September 1939	v New Zealand Maori at Hamilton
83	Sevesi Vatudau	prop	16 September 1939	v New Zealand Maori at Hamilton
84	Ilaitia Cobitu	lock	26 July 1947	v Tonga at Suva
85	Emosi Dawai	wing	26 July 1947	v Tonga at Suva
86	Luke Dawai	flanker	26 July 1947	v Tonga at Suva
87	Solomone Mataiyavi	lock	26 July 1947	v Tonga at Suva
88	Onisimo Naikovu	prop	26 July 1947	v Tonga at Suva
89	Naitini Tuiyau	scrum-half	26 July 1947	v Tonga at Suva
90	Etuate Nima	centre	26 July 1947	v Tonga at Suva
91	Manasa Nukuvou	no. 8	26 July 1947	v Tonga at Suva
92	Ilisoni Ravoka	centre	26 July 1947	v Tonga at Suva
93	Lui Saladoka	hooker	26 July 1947	v Tonga at Suva
94	Waisea Tuisese	wing	26 July 1947	v Tonga at Suva
95	Alipate Veikoso	fullback	26 July 1947	v Tonga at Suva
96	Taniela Ranavue	(replacement)	26 July 1947	v Tonga at Suva
97	Marika Tabukaci		26 July 1947	v Tonga at Suva
98	Apisake Kikau	lock	31 July 1948	v New Zealand Maori at Suva
99	Malakai Labaibure	lock	31 July 1948	v New Zealand Maori at Suva
100	Joeli Susu	hooker	31 July 1948	v New Zealand Maori at Suva
101	Sailosi Valewai	prop	31 July 1948	v New Zealand Maori at Suva
102	Ilaitia Vuivuda	fullback	31 July 1948	v New Zealand Maori at Suva
103	Atunaisa Camaibau	prop	4 August 1948	v New Zealand Maori at Suva
104	Kalivati Cavuilati	wing	4 August 1948	v New Zealand Maori at Suva
105	Macanawai Cevalawa	lock	4 August 1948	v New Zealand Maori at Suva
106	Jone Ravu	centre	4 August 1948	v New Zealand Maori at Suva
107	Alipate Doviverata	wing	7 August 1948	v New Zealand Maori at Suva
108	Semisi Baleca	flanker	5 September 1951	v New Zealand Maori at Wellington
109	George Cavalevu	centre	5 September 1951	v New Zealand Maori at Wellington
110	Sunia Ganilau	centre	5 September 1951	v New Zealand Maori at Wellington
111	Waisake Kunavula	lock	5 September 1951	v New Zealand Maori at Wellington
112	Penaia Lese	fullback	5 September 1951	v New Zealand Maori at Wellington
113	Josefa Levula	fly-half	5 September 1951	v New Zealand Maori at Wellington
114	Isimeli Radrodro	flanker	5 September 1951	v New Zealand Maori at Wellington
115	Semisi Ralagi	prop	5 September 1951	v New Zealand Maori at Wellington
116	Wame Salabogi	wing	5 September 1951	v New Zealand Maori at Wellington
117	Maikeli Tuvoli	lock	5 September 1951	v New Zealand Maori at Wellington
118	Suliasi Vatubua	scrum-half	5 September 1951	v New Zealand Maori at Wellington
119	Rusiate Vuruya	no. 8	5 September 1951	v New Zealand Maori at Wellington
120	Savenaca Pe	(replacement)	5 September 1951	v New Zealand Maori at Wellington
121	Peni Tove	(replacement)	5 September 1951	v New Zealand Maori at Wellington
122	Semesa Seruvatu	lock	26 July 1952	v Australia at Sydney
123	Isikeli Cawa	lock	9 August 1952	v Australia at Sydney
124	Samuela Domoni	wing	9 August 1952	v Australia at Sydney
125	Navitalai Taga	centre	9 August 1952	v Australia at Sydney
126	Mesake Biumaiwai	centre	5 June 1954	v Australia at Brisbane
127	Aminisitai Burogolevu	no. 8	5 June 1954	v Australia at Brisbane
128	Gabirieli Naborisi	flanker	5 June 1954	v Australia at Brisbane
129	Apenisa Nawalu	hooker	5 June 1954	v Australia at Brisbane
130	Josefa Saukuru	prop	5 June 1954	v Australia at Brisbane
131	Orisi Dawai	wing	26 June 1954	v Australia at Sydney
132	Tomasi Naidole	centre	14 August 1954	v New Zealand Maori at Lautoka
133	Ratulevu Silatolu	flanker	14 August 1954	v New Zealand Maori at Lautoka
134	Ravuama Vunakece	prop	14 August 1954	v New Zealand Maori at Lautoka
135	Senitiki Naurisau	prop	21 August 1954	v New Zealand Maori at Suva
136	Aseri Kunawave	fly-half	10 August 1957	v New Zealand Maori at Wellington
137	Jese Mucunabitu	scrum-half	10 August 1957	v New Zealand Maori at Wellington
138	Nacanieli Nabaro	no. 8	10 August 1957	v New Zealand Maori at Wellington
139	Mikaele Naikovu	hooker	10 August 1957	v New Zealand Maori at Wellington
140	Paula Nayacakalou	flanker	10 August 1957	v New Zealand Maori at Wellington
141	Sanaila Sautu	prop	10 August 1957	v New Zealand Maori at Wellington
142	Anare Secake	flanker	10 August 1957	v New Zealand Maori at Wellington
143	Jone Tabaiwalu	lock	10 August 1957	v New Zealand Maori at Wellington
144	Baniua Tanivukavu	wing	10 August 1957	v New Zealand Maori at Wellington
145	Nat Uluiviti	fullback	10 August 1957	v New Zealand Maori at Wellington
146	Apenisa Kuruisaqila	flanker	24 August 1957	v New Zealand Maori at Dunedin
147	Peni Wadali	(replacement)	24 August 1957	v New Zealand Maori at Dunedin
148	Kaiava Bose	fly-half	2 August 1958	v Tonga at Nuku A'lofa
149	Ilaitia Ravouvou	lock	2 August 1958	v Tonga at Nuku A'lofa
150	Maika Ravula	flanker	2 August 1958	v Tonga at Nuku A'lofa
151	Inoke Tabualevu	centre	2 August 1958	v Tonga at Nuku A'lofa
152	Eremasi Lovodua	(replacement)	2 August 1958	v Tonga at Nuku A'lofa
153	Seru Tuisese	(replacement)	2 August 1958	v Tonga at Nuku A'lofa
154	Patimio Tatukivei	flanker	9 August 1958	v Tonga at Nuku A'lofa
155	Peni Rika	(replacement)	9 August 1958	v Tonga at Nuku A'lofa
156	Suliasi Cavu	flanker	13 August 1958	v Tonga at Nuku A'lofa
157	Ulaiasi Radike	centre	26 September 1959	v Tonga at Suva
158	Sakiusa Tuva	hooker	26 September 1959	v Tonga at Suva
159	Eliki Gaunavou	fullback	10 June 1961	v Australia at Brisbane
160	Sailosi Kepa	flanker	10 June 1961	v Australia at Brisbane
161	Jone Nabou	flanker	10 June 1961	v Australia at Brisbane
162	Joeli Naucabalavu	no. 8	10 June 1961	v Australia at Brisbane
163	Simione Rarasea	centre	10 June 1961	v Australia at Brisbane
164	Seteo Rasau	prop	10 June 1961	v Australia at Brisbane
165	Nemesio Ratuveilawa	scrum-half	10 June 1961	v Australia at Brisbane
166	Eparama Ravi	centre	10 June 1961	v Australia at Brisbane
167	Josua Vadugu	prop	10 June 1961	v Australia at Brisbane
168	Vereniki Nalio	lock	17 June 1961	v Australia at Sydney
169	Sitiveni Tawase	scrum-half	17 June 1961	v Australia at Sydney
170	Epeli Rayawa	flanker	1 July 1961	v Australia at Melbourne
171	Epi Bolawaqatabu	flanker	30 August 1963	v Samoa at Suva
172	Vinaiya Buli	wing	30 August 1963	v Samoa at Suva
173	Suliasi Daunitutu	wing	30 August 1963	v Samoa at Suva
174	Jope Seniloli	no. 8	30 August 1963	v Samoa at Suva
175	Jone Raikuna	fly-half	30 August 1963	v Samoa at Suva
176	Petero Rasiosateki	centre	30 August 1963	v Samoa at Suva
177	Jone Sokovata	flanker	30 August 1963	v Samoa at Suva
178	Ulaiasi Tukana	hooker	30 August 1963	v Samoa at Suva
179	Epi Kunavore	centre	31 August 1963	v Tonga at Lautoka
180	Apisai Toga	lock	31 August 1963	v Tonga at Lautoka
181	Sevaro Walisoliso	prop	31 August 1963	v Tonga at Lautoka
182	Josateki Nasova	fly-half	5 September 1963	v Samoa at Suva
183	Aca Soqosoqo	no. 8	27 July 1964	v New Zealand Maori at Suva
184	Apakuki Suluaqalo	prop	27 July 1964	v New Zealand Maori at Suva
185	George Barley	fly-half	26 September 1964	v Wales XV at Cardiff
186	Aporosa Robe	wing	26 September 1964	v Wales XV at Cardiff
187	Sela Toga	no. 8	26 September 1964	v Wales XV at Cardiff
188	Adriu Nadredre	flanker	17 October 1964	v France at Colombes
189	Suliasi Tolotu	no. 8	17 October 1964	v France at Colombes
190	Samuela Vanini	wing	17 October 1964	v France at Colombes
191	Setareki Vola	centre	24 October 1964	v Canada XV at Victoria
192	Amenatave Gutugutuwai	wing	8 July 1967	v Tonga at Nuku A'lofa
193	Moritikei Nabuta	prop	8 July 1967	v Tonga at Nuku A'lofa
194	Kiniviliame Nalatu	wing	8 July 1967	v Tonga at Nuku A'lofa
195	Samu Naqelevuki	centre	8 July 1967	v Tonga at Nuku A'lofa
196	Sakiasi Ose	flanker	8 July 1967	v Tonga at Nuku A'lofa
197	Nasivi Ravouvou	lock	8 July 1967	v Tonga at Nuku A'lofa
198	Setareki Tamanivalu	flanker	8 July 1967	v Tonga at Nuku A'lofa
199	Sakopo Vodivodi	scrum-half	8 July 1967	v Tonga at Nuku A'lofa
200	Vilaime Waka	centre	8 July 1967	v Tonga at Nuku A'lofa
201	Apenisa Tokairavua	prop	15 July 1967	v Tonga at Nuku A'lofa
202	Maika Vakatawabai	hooker	15 July 1967	v Tonga at Nuku A'lofa
203	Asaeli Batibasaga	wing	22 July 1967	v Tonga at Nuku A'lofa
204	Waisea Tubu	centre	22 July 1967	v Tonga at Nuku A'lofa
205	Albert Eastgate	wing	25 June 1968	v New Zealand XV at Suva
206	Suliasi Nacolai	wing	25 June 1968	v New Zealand XV at Suva
207	Ropate Qalo	centre	25 June 1968	v New Zealand XV at Suva
208	Lario Raitilava	centre	25 June 1968	v New Zealand XV at Suva
209	Timoci Tukaitabua	flanker	25 June 1968	v New Zealand XV at Suva
210	Apisalome Turagacoko	prop	25 June 1968	v New Zealand XV at Suva
211	Ilai Senivau	(replacement)	25 June 1968	v New Zealand XV at Suva
212	Meli Kurisaru	flanker	17 August 1968	v Tonga at Suva
213	Semesa Sacere	scrum-half	17 August 1968	v Tonga at Suva
214	Watile Tuinagiagia	fullback	17 August 1968	v Tonga at Suva
215	Isoa Volavola	prop	17 August 1968	v Tonga at Suva
216	Peniasi Nasalo	flanker	24 August 1968	v Tonga at Lautoka
217	Jona Qoro Narisia	prop	24 August 1968	v Tonga at Lautoka
218	Pio Tikoisuva	centre	24 August 1968	v Tonga at Lautoka
219	Seru Naitau	(replacement)	24 August 1968	v Tonga at Lautoka
220	Sefanaia Ratu	wing	7 September 1968	v Tonga at Suva
221	Senitiki Nasave	centre	25 June 1969	v Wales XV at Suva
222	George Sailosi	wing	25 June 1969	v Wales XV at Suva
223	Semesa Sikivou	scrum-half	25 June 1969	v Wales XV at Suva
224	Ilaitia Tuisese	lock	25 June 1969	v Wales XV at Suva
225	Inia Namua	centre	18 August 1969	v Papua New Guinea at Port Moresby
226	Atonio Racika	hooker	21 August 1969	v Solomon Islands at Port Moresby
227	Josateki Radrodro	wing	25 July 1970	v New Zealand Maori at Christchurch
228	Jo Sovau	prop	25 July 1970	v New Zealand Maori at Christchurch
229	Josaia Visei	fullback	25 July 1970	v New Zealand Maori at Christchurch
230	Isimeli Batibasaga	scrum-half	28 November 1970	v Canada at Burnaby Lake
231	Inoke Buadromo	fly-half	28 November 1970	v Canada at Burnaby Lake
232	Ravuama Latilevu	centre	28 November 1970	v Canada at Burnaby Lake
233	Sitiveni Ligamamada Rabuka	prop	28 November 1970	v Canada at Burnaby Lake
234	Vuniani Varo	wing	28 November 1970	v Canada at Burnaby Lake
235	Jope Jnr. Naucabalavu Jnr.	lock	15 July 1972	v Tonga at Nuku A'lofa
236	Tevita Rabuli	centre	15 July 1972	v Tonga at Nuku A'lofa
237	Taito Rauluni	scrum-half	15 July 1972	v Tonga at Nuku A'lofa
238	Wame Gavidi	fly-half	22 July 1972	v Tonga at Nuku A'lofa
239	Nimilote Ratudina	prop	22 July 1972	v Tonga at Nuku A'lofa
240	Aminiasi Naituyaga Sr.	centre	19 September 1972	v Australia at Suva
241	Rupeni Qaraniqio	flanker	19 September 1972	v Australia at Suva
242	Dan Lobendhan	fly-half	2 June 1973	v New Zealand Maori at Suva
243	Rodney Samuels	flanker	2 June 1973	v New Zealand Maori at Suva
244	Joe Savou	prop	2 June 1973	v New Zealand Maori at Suva
245	Tevita Raulumi	scrum-half	9 June 1973	v New Zealand Maori at Lautoka
246	Peter Hughes	prop	11 July 1973	v Tonga at Suva
247	Enele Malele	no. 8	11 July 1973	v Tonga at Suva
248	Emori Tudia	centre	11 July 1973	v Tonga at Suva
249	Luke Namadila	centre	28 August 1973	v England XV at Suva
250	Seremaia Cavuilati	centre	11 June 1974	v New Zealand XV at Suva
251	Vilikesa Mocelutu	no. 8	11 June 1974	v New Zealand XV at Suva
252	Watisoni Nasalo	fly-half	11 June 1974	v New Zealand XV at Suva
253	Isikeli Tasere	prop	11 June 1974	v New Zealand XV at Suva
254	Meli Masitabua	fly-half	17 August 1974	v New Zealand Maori at Auckland
255	Ilikimi Batibasaga	(replacement)	17 August 1974	v New Zealand Maori at Auckland
256	Isikeli Cagilaba	(replacement)	17 August 1974	v New Zealand Maori at Auckland
257	Ilisoni Taoba	lock	31 August 1974	v New Zealand Maori at Wellington
258	Sefanaia Basiyalo	wing	9 June 1976	v Ireland XV at Suva
259	Tomasi Latianara	wing	9 June 1976	v Ireland XV at Suva
260	Ilai Nabobo	lock	9 June 1976	v Ireland XV at Suva
261	Eroni Puamau	hooker	9 June 1976	v Ireland XV at Suva
262	Tomu Ravualala	fly-half	9 June 1976	v Ireland XV at Suva
263	Matereti Sarasau	prop	9 June 1976	v Ireland XV at Suva
264	Nasoni Uluvula	lock	9 June 1976	v Ireland XV at Suva
265	Livai Volavola	centre	9 June 1976	v Ireland XV at Suva
266	Luke Nabaro	(replacement)	9 June 1976	v Ireland XV at Suva
267	Mosese Nailumu	(replacement)	9 June 1976	v Ireland XV at Suva
268	Qele Ratu	(replacement)	9 June 1976	v Ireland XV at Suva
269	Peceli Kina	prop	12 June 1976	v Australia at Sydney
270	Isoa Makutu	flanker	12 June 1976	v Australia at Sydney
271	Viliame Ratudradra	flanker	12 June 1976	v Australia at Sydney
272	Josefa Rauto	prop	12 June 1976	v Australia at Sydney
273	Jolame Veidreyaki	wing	12 June 1976	v Australia at Sydney
274	Paula Waisake	scrum-half	12 June 1976	v Australia at Sydney
275	Eroni Matalau	flanker	19 June 1976	v Australia at Brisbane
276	Samisoni Viriviri	scrum-half	19 June 1976	v Australia at Brisbane
277	Josaia Taqiri	lock	26 June 1976	v Australia at Sydney
278	Robert Howard	centre	9 July 1977	v Tonga at Lautoka
279	Joape Kuinikoro	wing	9 July 1977	v Tonga at Lautoka
280	Kemueli Musunamasi	fullback	9 July 1977	v Tonga at Lautoka
281	Vuata Narisia	flanker	9 July 1977	v Tonga at Lautoka
282	Rabici Ganilau	lock	19 May 1979	v New Zealand Maori at Suva
283	Taniela Nayate	centre	19 May 1979	v New Zealand Maori at Suva
284	Esala Labalaba	(replacement)	29 May 1979	v England XV at Suva
285	Pita Kewa Nacuva	fullback	16 June 1979	v France XV at Suva
286	Ilami Lutumailagi	flanker	16 June 1979	v France XV at Suva
287	Josua Rayawa	lock	16 June 1979	v France XV at Suva
288	Kini Vosailagi	centre	16 June 1979	v France XV at Suva
289	Tevita Makutu	wing	30 August 1979	v Papua New Guinea at Suva
290	Simione Naiduki	flanker	30 August 1979	v Papua New Guinea at Suva
291	Joketani Ravouvou	prop	30 August 1979	v Papua New Guinea at Suva
292	Ilaitia Vai	centre	8 September 1979	v Tonga at Suva
293	Iokimi Finau	flanker	24 May 1980	v Australia at Suva
294	Ilikimi Kunagogo	lock	24 May 1980	v Australia at Suva
295	Sanivalati Laulau	wing	24 May 1980	v Australia at Suva
296	Isimeli Radrodro	fly-half	24 May 1980	v Australia at Suva
297	Eneri Ratudradra	no. 8	24 May 1980	v Australia at Suva
298	Tuimasi Tubananitu	prop	24 May 1980	v Australia at Suva
299	Lemeki Vuetaki	fullback	24 May 1980	v Australia at Suva
300	Vesivesi Bose	(replacement)	24 May 1980	v Australia at Suva
301	Kameli Nayacalevu	centre	30 August 1980	v New Zealand Maori at Rotorua
302	Kata Ratumuri	lock	30 August 1980	v New Zealand Maori at Rotorua
303	Sunia Seru	hooker	30 August 1980	v New Zealand Maori at Rotorua
304	Vikikesa Vatuwaliwali	flanker	30 August 1980	v New Zealand Maori at Rotorua
305	Isimeli Cerelala	flanker	13 September 1980	v New Zealand XV at Auckland
306	Jone Ratu	wing	13 September 1980	v New Zealand XV at Auckland
307	Navitalai Senilagakali	fly-half	13 September 1980	v New Zealand XV at Auckland
308	Sunia Nadruku	flanker	27 June 1981	v Samoa at Lautoka
309	Mosese Tamata	hooker	27 June 1981	v Samoa at Lautoka
310	Netava Tamaya	fullback	27 June 1981	v Samoa at Lautoka
311	Pio Tubui	fly-half	27 June 1981	v Samoa at Lautoka
312	Dominiko Manaseitava	(replacement)	4 July 1981	v Samoa at Suva
313	Sani Tagivetaua	centre	8 August 1981	v Tonga at Nuku A'lofa
314	Emosi Tatawaqa	flanker	8 August 1981	v Tonga at Nuku A'lofa
315	Sakaraia Nacaka	centre	15 August 1981	v Tonga at Nuku A'lofa
316	Esala Teleni	no. 8	2 June 1982	v Samoa at Apia
317	Sialeni Vuetaki	prop	2 June 1982	v Samoa at Apia
318	Sela Gutugutuwai	flanker	12 June 1982	v Samoa at Apia
319	Ilai Musunamasi	fullback	12 June 1982	v Samoa at Apia
320	Willie Rokowailoa	fly-half	12 June 1982	v Samoa at Apia
321	Peter Kean	hooker	21 August 1982	v Samoa at Suva
322	Rusiate Namoro	prop	21 August 1982	v Samoa at Suva
323	Waisale Natuna	scrum-half	21 August 1982	v Samoa at Suva
324	Lewis Politini	lock	21 August 1982	v Samoa at Suva
325	Setareki Vero	wing	21 August 1982	v Samoa at Suva
326	Kaiava Salusalu	wing	28 August 1982	v Tonga at Suva
327	Severo Koroduadua	fullback	25 September 1982	v Scotland XV at Murrayfield
328	Isikeli Tikoduadua	wing	25 September 1982	v Scotland XV at Murrayfield
329	Josevata Naikidi	(replacement)	25 September 1982	v Scotland XV at Murrayfield
330	Tiko Bucaonadi	prop	18 June 1983	v Tonga at Suva
331	Paulo Nawalu	scrum-half	18 June 1983	v Tonga at Suva
332	Koli Rakoroi	lock	18 June 1983	v Tonga at Suva
333	Samu Yalayala	centre	18 June 1983	v Tonga at Suva
334	Dusilele Bola	scrum-half	25 June 1983	v Samoa at Suva
335	Acura Niuqila	fly-half	25 June 1983	v Samoa at Suva
336	Sairusi Tabualevu	hooker	25 June 1983	v Samoa at Suva
337	Epeli Rakai	hooker	5 September 1983	v Samoa at Apia
338	Sairusi Naituku	no. 8	8 September 1983	v Solomon Islands at Apia
339	Emosi Katonitabua	centre	9 June 1984	v Australia at Suva
340	Peni Rauluni	centre	9 June 1984	v Australia at Suva
341	Epeli Turuva	fullback	9 June 1984	v Australia at Suva
342	Ilaitia Savai	(replacement)	9 June 1984	v Australia at Suva
343	Inoke Tabualevu	fullback	30 June 1984	v Samoa at Suva
344	Isikeli Leweniqila	fly-half	7 July 1984	v Tonga at Suva
345	Belasio Vukiwai	hooker	7 July 1984	v Tonga at Suva
346	Peceli Gale	flanker	21 July 1984	v Tonga at Suva
347	Solomoni Rasolea	wing	21 July 1984	v Tonga at Suva
348	Nemani Matirewa	(replacement)	21 July 1984	v Tonga at Suva
349	Tevita Tukunia	(replacement)	21 July 1984	v Tonga at Suva
350	Manasa Saunaki	fullback	27 October 1984	v New Zealand XV at Suva
351	Asaeli Hughes	lock	1 June 1985	v Samoa at Apia
352	Bruce Naulago	prop	1 June 1985	v Samoa at Apia
353	Rusiate Cavubulu	lock	5 June 1985	v Tonga at Apia
354	Mosese Nabati	centre	5 June 1985	v Tonga at Apia
355	Jo Qoro	flanker	5 June 1985	v Tonga at Apia
356	Tomasi Cama	centre	10 August 1985	v Australia at Brisbane
357	Semi Talawadua	(replacement)	10 August 1985	v Australia at Brisbane
358	Serupepeli Tuvula	wing	17 August 1985	v Australia at Sydney
359	Aliposo Waqaliti	(replacement)	17 August 1985	v Australia at Sydney
360	Jimi Damu	wing	19 October 1985	v Ireland XV at Lansdowne Road
361	Peni Volavola	prop	9 November 1985	v Wales at Cardiff
362	Jone Kubu	(replacement)	9 November 1985	v Wales at Cardiff
363	Savenaca Aria	centre	31 May 1986	v Wales at Suva
364	Alifereti Dere	flanker	31 May 1986	v Wales at Suva
365	Sirilo Lovokuro	fly-half	31 May 1986	v Wales at Suva
366	Ifereimi Tawake	flanker	31 May 1986	v Wales at Suva
367	Saula Bueta	flanker	28 June 1986	v Tonga at Nuku A'lofa
368	Osea Koliloa	flanker	28 June 1986	v Tonga at Nuku A'lofa
369	Viliame Lilidamu	wing	28 June 1986	v Tonga at Nuku A'lofa
370	Tom Mitchell	centre	28 June 1986	v Tonga at Nuku A'lofa
371	Salacieli Naivilawasa	prop	28 June 1986	v Tonga at Nuku A'lofa
372	Pauliasi Tabulutu	scrum-half	28 June 1986	v Tonga at Nuku A'lofa
373	Waisake Turaga	fly-half	28 June 1986	v Tonga at Nuku A'lofa
374	Fabiano Vakadrano	wing	28 June 1986	v Tonga at Nuku A'lofa
375	Kavekini Nalaga	wing	2 July 1986	v Samoa at Nuku A'lofa
376	Ilaitia Ravouvou	fly-half	2 July 1986	v Samoa at Nuku A'lofa
377	Peni Tora	flanker	2 July 1986	v Samoa at Nuku A'lofa
378	Epineri Naituku	centre	24 May 1987	v Argentina at Hamilton
379	Manasa Qoro	flanker	24 May 1987	v Argentina at Hamilton
380	John Sanday	no. 8	24 May 1987	v Argentina at Hamilton
381	Samu Vunivalu	(replacement)	24 May 1987	v Argentina at Hamilton
382	Jioji Cama	lock	27 May 1987	v New Zealand at Christchurch
383	Livai Kididromo	flanker	27 May 1987	v New Zealand at Christchurch
384	Mosese Taga	prop	27 May 1987	v New Zealand at Christchurch
385	Aisake Nadolo	lock	31 May 1987	v Italy at Dunedin
386	Tukeli Nakauta	flanker	22 August 1987	v Samoa at Suva
387	Niko Baleiverata	wing	31 May 1988	v Tonga at Apia
388	Kini Malai	fly-half	31 May 1988	v Tonga at Apia
389	Noa Nadruku	centre	31 May 1988	v Tonga at Apia
390	Ilisoni Naituku	prop	31 May 1988	v Tonga at Apia
391	Pita Naruma	lock	31 May 1988	v Tonga at Apia
392	Max Olsson	no. 8	31 May 1988	v Tonga at Apia
393	Mesake Rasari	lock	31 May 1988	v Tonga at Apia
394	Kinijoji Sarai	fullback	31 May 1988	v Tonga at Apia
395	Sakeasi Vonalagi	flanker	31 May 1988	v Tonga at Apia
396	Mesake Seavula	scrum-half	4 June 1988	v Samoa at Apia
397	John Edwards	fly-half	2 July 1988	v Tonga at Nuku A'lofa
398	Aporosa Ranuku Kenatale	prop	2 July 1988	v Tonga at Nuku A'lofa
399	Waisale Vatubua	wing	2 July 1988	v Tonga at Nuku A'lofa
400	Meli Radrekusa	lock	8 October 1988	v Tonga at Nadi
401	Tevita Vonolagi	centre	8 October 1988	v Tonga at Nadi
402	Luke Erenavula	centre	15 July 1989	v Tonga at Suva
403	Aminiasi Radrodro	fly-half	15 July 1989	v Tonga at Suva
404	Isikeli Waqavatu	wing	15 July 1989	v Tonga at Suva
405	Joeli Vulavou	scrum-half	22 July 1989	v Tonga at Nuku A'lofa
406	Waisale Serevi	fly-half	7 October 1989	v Belgium at Liege
407	Tomasi Lovo	wing	28 October 1989	v Scotland at Murrayfield
408	Lekima Vasuvulagi	scrum-half	28 October 1989	v Scotland at Murrayfield
409	Mosese Natuilagilagi	fullback	4 November 1989	v England at Twickenham
410	Vuata Narisia	fly-half	4 March 1990	v Japan at Tokyo
411	Alipate Rabitu	hooker	4 March 1990	v Japan at Tokyo
412	Ilivasi Tabua	flanker	4 March 1990	v Japan at Tokyo
413	Timoci Wainiqolo	lock	4 March 1990	v Japan at Tokyo
414	Sunia Banuve	centre	24 March 1990	v Tonga at Nuku A'lofa
415	Epeli Naituivau	prop	24 March 1990	v Tonga at Nuku A'lofa
416	Fili Seru	wing	24 March 1990	v Tonga at Nuku A'lofa
417	Vesito Rauluni	centre	23 June 1990	v Samoa at Nausori
418	Dranivesi Baleiwai	hooker	5 December 1990	v Hong Kong at Hong Kong
419	Sam Domoni	lock	5 December 1990	v Hong Kong at Hong Kong
420	Niumaia Korovata	wing	5 December 1990	v Hong Kong at Hong Kong
421	Waisea Suka	scrum-half	5 December 1990	v Hong Kong at Hong Kong
422	Opeti Turuva	fullback	5 December 1990	v Hong Kong at Hong Kong
423	Pio Kubuwai	flanker	1 June 1991	v Samoa at Apia
424	Kaleveti Naisoro	fly-half	1 June 1991	v Samoa at Apia
425	Tomasi Rabaka	wing	1 June 1991	v Samoa at Apia
426	Sekove Sadria	hooker	1 June 1991	v Samoa at Apia
427	Pita Dau	(replacement)	1 June 1991	v Samoa at Apia
428	Laisenia Kato	flanker	8 June 1991	v Tonga at Suva
429	Joeli Taqaiwai	wing	11 June 1991	v Tonga at Suva
430	Mosese Vosanibola	scrum-half	11 June 1991	v Tonga at Suva
431	Naibuka Vuli	prop	8 October 1991	v France at Grenoble
432	Lemeki Koroi	centre	20 June 1992	v Samoa at Suva
433	Samisoni Rabaka	scrum-half	20 June 1992	v Samoa at Suva
434	Isaia Rasila	hooker	20 June 1992	v Samoa at Suva
435	Viliame Rauluni	centre	20 June 1992	v Samoa at Suva
436	Viliame Sovalevu	wing	20 June 1992	v Samoa at Suva
437	Setareki Tawake	flanker	20 June 1992	v Samoa at Suva
438	Mesake Navugona	(replacement)	20 June 1992	v Samoa at Suva
439	Sakeasi Verevuni	(replacement)	20 June 1992	v Samoa at Suva
440	Anasa Koroitamana	scrum-half	25 July 1992	v Tonga at Nuku A'lofa
441	Gabirieli Naborisi	flanker	25 July 1992	v Tonga at Nuku A'lofa
442	Eliki Tikodraubuta	fly-half	25 July 1992	v Tonga at Nuku A'lofa
443	Jioji Vatubua	centre	25 July 1992	v Tonga at Nuku A'lofa
444	Aisea Komaitai	wing	31 October 1992	v New Zealand Maori at Suva
445	Esala Nauga	centre	31 October 1992	v New Zealand Maori at Suva
446	Eparama Tuivunivono	no. 8	31 October 1992	v New Zealand Maori at Suva
447	Joeli Matanatabu	flanker	5 June 1993	v Samoa at Apia
448	Waisea Mateiwai	fly-half	5 June 1993	v Samoa at Apia
449	Apenisa Sassen	hooker	17 July 1993	v Tonga at Nuku A'lofa
450	Eminoni Batimala	hooker	8 May 1994	v Japan at Ehime
451	Jonas Campbell	flanker	8 May 1994	v Japan at Ehime
452	Maka Kafoa	lock	8 May 1994	v Japan at Ehime
453	Alfi Mocelutu Vuivau	flanker	8 May 1994	v Japan at Ehime
454	Apisai Mucunabitu	fly-half	8 May 1994	v Japan at Ehime
455	Gabrieli Penjueli	prop	8 May 1994	v Japan at Ehime
456	Ilaisa Saukuru	fullback	8 May 1994	v Japan at Ehime
457	Manasa Sisiwa	wing	8 May 1994	v Japan at Ehime
458	Patiliai Tuidraki	wing	8 May 1994	v Japan at Ehime
459	Isikeli Basiyalo	(replacement)	8 May 1994	v Japan at Ehime
460	Aloesi Elder	(replacement)	8 May 1994	v Japan at Ehime
461	Livai Rasala	(replacement)	8 May 1994	v Japan at Ehime
462	Joeli Vidiri	(replacement)	8 May 1994	v Japan at Ehime
463	Napolini Vitau	(replacement)	8 May 1994	v Japan at Ehime
464	Rasolosolo Bogisa	fullback	15 May 1994	v Japan at Tokyo
465	Jason McLennan	scrum-half	4 June 1994	v New Zealand Maori at Christchurch
466	Sitaveni Matalulu	flanker	4 June 1994	v New Zealand Maori at Christchurch
467	Filipe Rayasi	fly-half	4 June 1994	v New Zealand Maori at Christchurch
468	Joni Toloi	centre	4 June 1994	v New Zealand Maori at Christchurch
469	Joeli Veitayaki	prop	4 June 1994	v New Zealand Maori at Christchurch
470	Ron Williams	prop	18 June 1994	v Wales at Suva
471	Marika Korovou	(replacement)	18 June 1994	v Wales at Suva
472	Paula Bale	wing	8 April 1995	v Canada at Nadi
473	Lawrence Little	centre	8 April 1995	v Canada at Nadi
474	Daniel Rouse	no. 8	8 April 1995	v Canada at Nadi
475	Sale Sorovaki	centre	8 April 1995	v Canada at Nadi
476	Emori Katalau	(replacement)	8 April 1995	v Canada at Nadi
477	Jacob Rauluni	(replacement)	8 April 1995	v Canada at Nadi
478	Manasa Bari	wing	1 July 1995	v Samoa at Apia
479	Bill Cavubati	prop	1 July 1995	v Samoa at Apia
480	Waisiki Masirewa	flanker	1 July 1995	v Samoa at Apia
481	Greg Smith	hooker	11 November 1995	v Wales at Cardiff
482	Tomasi Tamanivalu	flanker	11 November 1995	v Wales at Cardiff
483	Jone Waqabitu	fly-half	11 November 1995	v Wales at Cardiff
484	Mark Black	lock	2 July 1996	v South Africa at Pretoria
485	Nicky Little	fly-half	2 July 1996	v South Africa at Pretoria
486	Aisea Tuilevu	wing	2 July 1996	v South Africa at Pretoria
487	Alfred Uluinayau	(replacement)	2 July 1996	v South Africa at Pretoria
488	Sunia Nasilasila		20 July 1996	v Samoa at Suva
489	Apenisa Naevo	flanker	29 September 1996	v Hong Kong at Hong Kong
490	Niko Qoro	replacement	29 September 1996	v Hong Kong at Hong Kong
491	A. Naqicu	(replacement)	29 September 1996	v Hong Kong at Hong Kong
492	Setoki Niqara	lock	5 October 1996	v Hong Kong at Hong Kong
493	Jone Vakaloloma	scrum-half	5 October 1996	v Hong Kong at Hong Kong
494	Ilaitia Vuiyasawa		5 October 1996	v Hong Kong at Hong Kong
495	Mosese Rauluni	scrum-half	1 November 1996	v New Zealand Maori at Suva
496	Fero Lasagavibau	wing	14 June 1997	v New Zealand at North Shore City
497	Aminiasi Naituyaga	no. 8	14 June 1997	v New Zealand at North Shore City
498	Simon Raiwalui	lock	14 June 1997	v New Zealand at North Shore City
499	Meli Tamanitoakula	flanker	26 May 1998	v Scotland at Suva
500	Sikeli Nasau	(replacement)	26 May 1998	v Scotland at Suva
501	Samu Saumaisue	(replacement)	26 May 1998	v Scotland at Suva
502	Meli Nakauta	centre	27 June 1998	v France at Suva
503	Inoke Male	no. 8	18 September 1998	v Australia at Sydney
504	Aparama Bosekora	(replacement)	22 September 1998	v Samoa at Canberra
505	Viliame Satala	fullback	15 May 1999	v Canada at Vancouver
506	Koli Sewabu	no. 8	15 May 1999	v Canada at Vancouver
507	Waisake Sotutu	centre	15 May 1999	v Canada at Vancouver
508	Marika Vunibaka	wing	15 May 1999	v Canada at Vancouver
509	Imanueli Tikomaimakogai	wing	22 May 1999	v United States of America at San Francisco
510	Jope Tuikabe	(replacement)	22 May 1999	v United States of America at San Francisco
511	Sikeli Qauqau	fullback	3 July 1999	v Samoa at Lautoka
512	Tabai Matson	centre	3 August 1999	v New Zealand Maori at Suva
513	Paula Biutanaseva	(replacement)	24 August 1999	v Spain at Avezzano
514	Alifereti Doviverata	(replacement)	24 August 1999	v Spain at Avezzano
515	Sirilo Lala	fullback	26 August 1999	v Uruguay at L'Aquila
516	Sailosi Naiteqe	flanker	20 May 2000	v Japan at Tokyo
517	Saimoni Rokini	wing	20 May 2000	v Japan at Tokyo
518	Kameli Tilalati	centre	20 May 2000	v Japan at Tokyo
519	Seremaia Bai	(replacement)	20 May 2000	v Japan at Tokyo
520	Peniasi Damu	(replacement)	20 May 2000	v Japan at Tokyo
521	Bill Gadolo	(replacement)	20 May 2000	v Japan at Tokyo
522	Alipate Naqaya	(replacement)	20 May 2000	v Japan at Tokyo
523	Seru Rabeni	(replacement)	20 May 2000	v Japan at Tokyo
524	Ilaitia Tuisese	(replacement)	20 May 2000	v Japan at Tokyo
525	Norman Ligairi	(replacement)	26 May 2000	v Tonga at Nuku A'lofa
526	Jolame Nadolo	(replacement)	26 May 2000	v Tonga at Nuku A'lofa
527	Vilimoni Delasau	wing	30 June 2000	v United States of America at Apia
528	Kameli Natoba	fullback	30 June 2000	v United States of America at Apia
529	Henry Qiodravu	prop	30 June 2000	v United States of America at Apia
530	Semisi Dakuiyaco	(replacement)	7 July 2000	v Canada at Apia
531	Dan Baleinadogo	wing	25 May 2001	v Tonga at Nuku A'lofa
532	Joseph Koroiadi	flanker	25 May 2001	v Tonga at Nuku A'lofa
533	Epeli Ratuniata	(replacement)	9 June 2001	v Samoa at Suva
534	Sisa Koyamaibole	lock	16 June 2001	v Tonga at Lautoka
535	Adriu Rinakama	wing	23 June 2001	v Samoa at Apia
536	Pita Bolea	(replacement)	23 June 2001	v Samoa at Apia
537	Sunia Sevu	(replacement)	23 June 2001	v Samoa at Apia
538	Mesake Davu	no. 8	10 November 2001	v Italy at Treviso
539	Isoa Domolailai	lock	10 November 2001	v Italy at Treviso
540	Apisai Nagi Mavua	prop	10 November 2001	v Italy at Treviso
541	Ilai Derenalagi	centre	24 November 2001	v France at Saint-Etienne
542	Richard Nyholt	(replacement)	24 November 2001	v France at Saint-Etienne
543	Emori Tuisese	(replacement)	24 November 2001	v France at Saint-Etienne
544	Tevita Latianara	wing	1 June 2002	v Samoa at Apia
545	Isaac Mow	wing	1 June 2002	v Samoa at Apia
546	Joseph Narruhn	(replacement)	1 June 2002	v Samoa at Apia
547	Ifereimi Rawaqa	(replacement)	1 June 2002	v Samoa at Apia
548	Senirusi Seruvakula	(replacement)	1 June 2002	v Samoa at Apia
549	Epeli Ruivadra	wing	7 June 2002	v Tonga at Nuku A'lofa
550	Timoci Yacabula	lock	7 June 2002	v Tonga at Nuku A'lofa
551	Atonio Nariva	fullback	24 November 2002	v Scotland at Murrayfield
552	Kele Leawere	(replacement)	24 November 2002	v Scotland at Murrayfield
553	Kitione Salawa	flanker	4 July 2003	v Tonga at Nadi
554	Sekove Leawere	wing	11 July 2003	v Tonga at Nuku A'lofa
555	Rupeni Caucaunibuca	wing	18 August 2003	v Argentina at Cordoba
556	Vula Maimuri	(replacement)	18 August 2003	v Argentina at Cordoba
557	Nacanieli Seru	(replacement)	18 August 2003	v Argentina at Cordoba
558	Isa Nacewa	(replacement)	1 November 2003	v Scotland at Sydney
559	Josese Baleikasavu	prop	5 June 2004	v Tonga at Nuku A'lofa
560	Kalivati Baleisawani	flanker	5 June 2004	v Tonga at Nuku A'lofa
561	Sireli Bobo	wing	5 June 2004	v Tonga at Nuku A'lofa
562	Joeli Lotawa	hooker	5 June 2004	v Tonga at Nuku A'lofa
563	Jack Prasad	fly-half	5 June 2004	v Tonga at Nuku A'lofa
564	Seva Rokobaro	(replacement)	5 June 2004	v Tonga at Nuku A'lofa
565	Netava Tagi	(replacement)	5 June 2004	v Tonga at Nuku A'lofa
566	Julian Vulakoro	(replacement)	5 June 2004	v Tonga at Nuku A'lofa
567	Maikeli Nadridri Sego	wing	12 June 2004	v Samoa at Suva
568	Saiasi Fuli	(replacement)	12 June 2004	v Samoa at Suva
569	Apisai Turukawa	(replacement)	12 June 2004	v Samoa at Suva
570	Marika Vakacegu	(replacement)	12 June 2004	v Samoa at Suva
571	Akuila Matanibukaca	lock	3 June 2005	v New Zealand Maori at Suva
572	Aca Ratuva	flanker	3 June 2005	v New Zealand Maori at Suva
573	Sunia Koto	(replacement)	3 June 2005	v New Zealand Maori at Suva
574	Jone Qovu	(replacement)	3 June 2005	v New Zealand Maori at Suva
575	Sam Tabua	(replacement)	3 June 2005	v New Zealand Maori at Suva
576	Jone Railomo	(replacement)	10 June 2005	v New Zealand at North Shore City
577	Ravuama Samo	prop	25 June 2005	v Tonga at Suva
578	Apolosi Satala	flanker	25 June 2005	v Tonga at Suva
579	Jo Tora	(replacement)	25 June 2005	v Tonga at Suva
580	Mosese Luveitasau	wing	9 July 2005	v Samoa at Apia
581	Akapusi Qera	flanker	9 July 2005	v Samoa at Apia
582	Langi Peters	(replacement)	9 July 2005	v Samoa at Apia
583	Maleli Kunavore	centre	30 July 2005	v Samoa at Suva
584	Kameli Ratuvou	wing	30 July 2005	v Samoa at Suva
585	Kini Salabogi	(replacement)	11 November 2005	v Wales at Millennium Stadium
586	Mosese Volavola	(replacement)	11 November 2005	v Wales at Millennium Stadium
587	Tiko Matawalu	prop	19 November 2005	v Portugal at Lisbon
588	Neumi Nanuku	wing	19 November 2005	v Portugal at Lisbon
589	Sikeli Gavidi Tubuvanere	(replacement)	19 November 2005	v Portugal at Lisbon
590	Aporosa Vata Tuinasau	(replacement)	26 November 2005	v Italy at Monza
591	Sakiusa Matadigo	no. 8	10 June 2006	v Tonga at Gosford
592	Seveci Taka	scrum-half	10 June 2006	v Tonga at Gosford
593	Netani Talei	(replacement)	10 June 2006	v Tonga at Gosford
594	Emosi Vucago	(replacement)	10 June 2006	v Tonga at Gosford
595	Semisi Naevo	flanker	1 July 2006	v Japan at Osaka
596	Vereniki Goneva	centre	19 May 2007	v Samoa at Apia
597	Isoa Neivua	wing	19 May 2007	v Samoa at Apia
598	Vesi Rauluni	wing	19 May 2007	v Samoa at Apia
599	Taniela Rawaqa	fullback	19 May 2007	v Samoa at Apia
600	Tomasi Soqeta	no. 8	19 May 2007	v Samoa at Apia
601	Alefoso Yalayalatabua	prop	19 May 2007	v Samoa at Apia
602	Vitori Buatava	(replacement)	19 May 2007	v Samoa at Apia
603	Wame Lewaravu	(replacement)	19 May 2007	v Samoa at Apia
604	Graham Dewes	prop	26 May 2007	v Japan at Lautoka
605	Gabiriele Lovobalavu	(replacement)	26 May 2007	v Japan at Lautoka
606	Waisea Luveniyali	fly-half	16 June 2007	v Tonga at Lautoka
607	Michael Tagicakibau	wing	16 June 2007	v Tonga at Lautoka
608	Deryck Thomas	flanker	16 June 2007	v Tonga at Lautoka
609	Vereniki Sauturaga	(replacement)	16 June 2007	v Tonga at Lautoka
610	Dale Tonawai	(replacement)	16 June 2007	v Tonga at Lautoka
611	Jone Daunivucu	scrum-half	23 September 2007	v Australia at Montpellier
612	Timoci Nagusa	wing	7 June 2008	v Samoa at Lautoka
613	Sireli Naqelevuki	centre	7 June 2008	v Samoa at Lautoka
614	Jonetani Ralulu	(replacement)	7 June 2008	v Samoa at Lautoka
615	Viliame Seuseu	(replacement)	7 June 2008	v Samoa at Lautoka
616	Nemia Kenatale	(scrum-half)	22 June 2008	v Japan at Tokyo
617	Sailosi Rabonaqica	(no. 8)	22 June 2008	v Japan at Tokyo
618	Josefa Domolailai	lock	5 July 2008	v Tonga at Nuku A'lofa
619	Saula Radidi	centre	5 July 2008	v Tonga at Nuku A'lofa
620	Jeremaiya Tamanisau	wing	5 July 2008	v Tonga at Nuku A'lofa
621	Iliesa Keresoni	(replacement)	5 July 2008	v Tonga at Nuku A'lofa
622	Rupeni Nasiga	(replacement)	5 July 2008	v Tonga at Nuku A'lofa
623	Samu Bola	flanker	13 June 2009	v Tonga at Nuku A'lofa
624	Filimoni Bolavucu	wing	13 June 2009	v Tonga at Nuku A'lofa
625	Alipate Noilea	fly-half	13 June 2009	v Tonga at Nuku A'lofa
626	Waisale Sukanaveita	centre	13 June 2009	v Tonga at Nuku A'lofa
627	Sireli Ledua	(lock)	13 June 2009	v Tonga at Nuku A'lofa
628	Leone Nakarawa	(replacement)	13 June 2009	v Tonga at Nuku A'lofa
629	Ilikena Bolakoro	centre	27 June 2009	v Samoa at Lautoka
630	Ropate Ratu	wing	27 June 2009	v Samoa at Lautoka
631	Sean Morrell	flanker	3 July 2009	v Japan at Suva
632	Ravai Fatiaki	(fly-half)	3 July 2009	v Japan at Suva
633	Aisake Tarogi	(prop)	3 July 2009	v Japan at Suva
634	Anthony Wise	(flanker)	3 July 2009	v Japan at Suva
635	Asaeli Boko	no. 8	14 November 2009	v Scotland at Murrayfield
636	Deacon Manu	prop	14 November 2009	v Scotland at Murrayfield
637	Josh Matavesi	fullback	14 November 2009	v Scotland at Murrayfield
638	Napolioni Nalaga	wing	14 November 2009	v Scotland at Murrayfield
639	Viliame Veikoso	hooker	14 November 2009	v Scotland at Murrayfield
640	Jonetani Ratu	(fullback)	14 November 2009	v Scotland at Murrayfield
641	Nasoni Roko	(wing)	14 November 2009	v Scotland at Murrayfield
642	Waisale Vatuvoka	scrum-half	14 November 2009	v Scotland at Murrayfield
643	Jimilai Nakaidawa	flanker	28 November 2009	v Romania at Bucharest
644	Semi Tadulala	wing	28 November 2009	v Romania at Bucharest
645	Kele Bola	scrum-half	28 November 2009	v Romania at Bucharest
646	Seko Kalou Qaraniqio	(lock)	5 June 2010	v Australia at Canberra
647	Campese Ma'afu	(prop)	5 June 2010	v Australia at Canberra
648	Talemaitoga Tuapati	(hooker)	5 June 2010	v Australia at Canberra
649	Dominiko Waqaniburotu	flanker	5 June 2010	v Australia at Canberra
650	Nemani Nadolo Nasiganiyavi	wing	5 June 2010	v Australia at Canberra
651	Jaoji Dakuvula	fullback	12 June 2010	v Japan at Lautoka
652	Kelepi Ketedromo	Number 8	12 June 2010	v Japan at Lautoka
653	Nikola Matawalu	(scrum-half)	12 June 2010	v Japan at Lautoka
654	Malakai Bakaniceva	wing	12 June 2010	v Japan at Lautoka
655	Epeli Ruivadra II	(centre)	12 June 2010	v Japan at Lautoka
656	Joe Nasilisili	(centre)	19 June 2010	v Tonga at Apia
657	William Saukuru	wing	26 June 2010	v Samoa at Apia
658	Albert Vulivuli	centre	13 November 2010	v France at Nantes
659	Malakai Ravulo	flanker	13 November 2010	v France at Nantes
660	Vesi Rarawa	prop	27 November 2010	v Italy at Modena
661	Tevita Cavubati	lock	2 July 2011	v Tonga at Lautoka
662	Kini Murimurivalu	fullback	2 July 2011	v Tonga at Lautoka
663	Adriu Delai	fullback	2 July 2011	v Tonga at Lautoka
664	Penijamini Makutu	prop	13 July 2011	v Japan at Lautoka
665	Setefano Somoca	prop	13 July 2011	v Japan at Lautoka
666	Waisea Nailago	prop	2 July 2011	v Japan at Lautoka
667	Isake Katonibau	centre	5 June 2012	v Japan at Nagoya
668	Simeli Koniferedi	fullback	5 June 2012	v Japan at Nagoya
669	Setareki Koroilagilagi	flyhalf	5 June 2012	v Japan at Nagoya
670	Apisai Naikatini	lock	5 June 2012	v Japan at Nagoya
671	Waisea Nayacalevu	wing	5 June 2012	v Japan at Nagoya
672	Iliesa Ratuva	flanker	5 June 2012	v Japan at Nagoya
673	Watisoni Votu	wing	5 June 2012	v Japan at Nagoya
674	Aloisio Butonidualevu	(centre)	5 June 2012	v Japan at Nagoya
675	Benedito Koroi	(wing)	5 June 2012	v Japan at Nagoya
676	Seremaia Naureuere	(hooker)	5 June 2012	v Japan at Nagoya
677	Jerry Yanuyanutawa	(prop)	10 June 2012	v Samoa at Nagoya
678	Iliesa Salusalu	(hooker)	10 June 2012	v Samoa at Nagoya
679	Metuisela Talebula	fullback	16 June 2012	v Scotland at Lautoka
680	Maikeli Mocetadra	wing	20 June 2012	v Tonga at Lautoka
681	Apakuki Vuaviri	(flanker)	20 June 2012	v Tonga at Lautoka
682	Api Ratuniyarawa	lock	10 November 2012	v England at Twickenham
683	Samu Wara	wing	10 November 2012	v England at Twickenham
684	Manasa Saulo Ramumu	(prop)	10 November 2012	v England at Twickenham
685	Aisea Natoga	(wing)	24 November 2012	v Georgia at Tbilisi
686	Nemani Nagusa	no.8	24 November 2012	v Georgia at Tbilisi
687	Leone Ravuetaki	centre	1 June 2013	v Japan at Lautoka
688	Jiuta Lutumailagi	(flyhalf)	1 June 2013	v Japan at Lautoka
689	Aporosa Kenatale	(scrumhalf)	5 June 2013	v Canada at Nepean
690	Sam Matavesi	(no.8)	5 June 2013	v Canada at Nepean
691	Levani Botia	(centre)	9 November 2013	v Portugal at Lisbon
692	Alex Rokobaro	(flyhalf)	9 November 2013	v Portugal at Lisbon
693	Asaeli Tikoirotuma	(wing)	9 November 2013	v Portugal at Lisbon
694	Peni Ravai	(prop)	23 November 2013	v Romania at Bucharest
695	Henry Seniloli	(scrumhalf)	23 November 2013	v Romania at Bucharest
696	Maku Koroiyadi	(scrumhalf)	30 November 2013	v Barbarians at Twickenham
697	Sam Speight	(wing)	30 November 2013	v Barbarians at Twickenham
698	Isei Colati	(prop)	7 June 2014	v Italy at Suva
699	Lee-Roy Atalifo	(prop)	28 June 2014	v Cook Islands at Suva
700	Alipate Ratini	(wing)	8 November 2014	v France at Marseille
701	Nemia Soqeta	(lock)	8 November 2014	v France at Marseille
702	Taniela Koroi	(prop)	28 November 2014	v USA at Vannes
703	Benito Masilevu	(wing)	11 July 2015	v NZ Maori at Suva
704	Ben Volavola	(flyhalf)	11 July 2015	v NZ Maori at Suva
705	Peceli Yato	(flanker)	18 July 2015	v Tonga at Suva
706	Naulia Dawai	flanker	11 June 2016	v Tonga at Suva
707	Patrick Osborne	winger	11 June 2016	v Tonga at Suva
708	Samisoni Viriviri	fullback	11 June 2016	v Tonga at Suva
709	Eremasi Radrodro	(flanker)	11 June 2016	v Tonga at Suva
710	Save Tabakanalagi	(no.8)	11 June 2016	v Tonga at Suva
711	Serupepeli Vularika	(fullback)	11 June 2016	v Tonga at Suva
712	Eroni Vasiteri Narumasa	centre	18 June 2016	v Samoa at Suva
713	Mosese Voka	(flanker)	18 June 2016	v Samoa at Suva
714	Savenaca Rawaca	winger	24 June 2016	v Georgia at Suva
715	Mesake Doge	(prop)	24 June 2016	v Georgia at Suva
716	Joeli Veitayaki Jr.	prop	26 November 2016	v Japan at Vannes
717	Jale Vatubua	centre	12 June 2017	v Australia at Melbourne
718	Viliame Mata	(flanker)	12 June 2017	v Australia at Melbourne
719	Kalivati Tawake	(prop)	12 June 2017	v Australia at Melbourne
720	Josua Tuisova	winger	24 Jun 2017	v Scotland at Suva
721	Mosese Ducivaki	(prop)	24 Jun 2017	v Scotland at Suva
722	Sikeli Nabou	(lock)	24 Jun 2017	v Scotland at Suva
723	John Stewart	(centre)	24 Jun 2017	v Scotland at Suva
724	Frank Lomani	(scrum-half)	15 Jul 2017	v Samoa at Apia
725	Semi Kunatani	flanker	11 Nov 2017	v Italy at Catania
726	Ropate Rinakama	(prop)	11 Nov 2017	v Italy at Catania
727	Ratunaisa Navuma	(hooker)	25 Nov 2017	v Canada at Narbonne
728	Sevanaïa Galala	centre	9 Jun 2018	v Samoa at Suva
729	Eroni Mawi	(prop)	9 Jun 2018	v Samoa at Suva
730	Alivereti Veitokani	(winger)	9 Jun 2018	v Samoa at Suva
731	Tuvere Vugakoto	(hooker)	9 Jun 2018	v Samoa at Suva
732	Semi Radradra	centre	16 Jun 2018	v Georgia at Suva
733	Albert Tuisue	(lock)	23 Jun 2018	v Tonga at Lautoka
734	Seta Tuicuvu	fullback	10 Nov 2018	v Scotland at Murrayfield
735	Mesu Dolokoto	(hooker)	10 Nov 2018	v Scotland at Murrayfield
736	Eroni Sau	winger	17 Nov 2018	v Uruguay at Hartpury
737	Filipo Nakosi	winger	20 Jul 2019	v NZ Maori at Rotorua
738	Tevita Ratuva	lock	20 Jul 2019	v NZ Maori at Rotorua
739	John Dyer	(no. 8)	20 Jul 2019	v NZ Maori at Rotorua
740	Junior Tagi	(prop)	20 Jul 2019	v NZ Maori at Rotorua
741	Mesu Kunavula	flanker	5 Dec 2020	v Georgia at Murrayfield
742	Temo Mayanavanua	lock	5 Dec 2020	v Georgia at Murrayfield
743	Haereiti Hetet	(prop)	5 Dec 2020	v Georgia at Murrayfield
744	Tevita Ikanivere	(hooker)	5 Dec 2020	v Georgia at Murrayfield
745	Simione Kuruvoli	(scrum-half)	5 Dec 2020	v Georgia at Murrayfield
746	Chris Minimbi	(lock)	5 Dec 2020	v Georgia at Murrayfield
747	Manueli Ratuniyarawa	(no. 8)	5 Dec 2020	v Georgia at Murrayfield
748	Samu Tawake	(prop)	5 Dec 2020	v Georgia at Murrayfield
749	Eneriko Buliruarua	(fullback)	10 Jul 2021	v New Zealand at Dunedin
750	Manasa Mataele	(winger)	10 Jul 2021	v New Zealand at Dunedin
751	Peniami Narisia	(hooker)	10 Jul 2021	v New Zealand at Dunedin
752	Kitione Kamikamica	(no. 8)	17 Jul 2021	v New Zealand at Hamilton
753	Moses Sorovi	(fullback)	17 Jul 2021	v New Zealand at Hamilton
754	Teti Tela	(fly-half)	17 Jul 2021	v New Zealand at Hamilton
755	Vilimoni Botitu	centre	6 Nov 2021	v Spain at Madrid
756	Aminiasi Tuimaba	winger	6 Nov 2021	v Spain at Madrid
757	Jiuta Wainiqolo	winger	6 Nov 2021	v Spain at Madrid
758	Masivesi Dakuwaqa	(flanker)	6 Nov 2021	v Spain at Madrid
759	Henry Spring	(hooker)	6 Nov 2021	v Spain at Madrid
760	Apisai Naqalevu	(centre)	14 Nov 2021	v Wales at Cardiff
761	Zuriel Togiatama	(hooker)	14 Nov 2021	v Wales at Cardiff
762	Vinaya Habosi	(winger)	2 Jul 2022	v Tonga at Suva
763	Ratu Peni Matawalu	(scrum half)	2 Jul 2022	v Tonga at Suva
764	Isoa Nasilasila	(lock)	2 Jul 2022	v Tonga at Suva
765	Rusiate Nasove	(back row)	2 Jul 2022	v Tonga at Suva
766	Kalaveti Ravouvou	(winger)	2 Jul 2022	v Tonga at Suva
767	Seta Tamanivalu	(centre)	2 Jul 2022	v Tonga at Suva
768	Sireli Maqala	(centre)	5 Nov 2022	v Scotland at Edinburgh
769	Livai Natave	(prop)	5 Nov 2022	v Scotland at Edinburgh
770	Ratu Leone Rotuisolia	(lock)	5 Nov 2022	v Scotland at Edinburgh
771	Adrea Cocagi	(centre)	12 Nov 2022	v Ireland at Dublin
772	Te Ahiwaru Cirikidaveta	(lock)	22 Jul 2023	v Tonga at Lautoka
773	Caleb Muntz	(fly half)	22 Jul 2023	v Tonga at Lautoka
774	Selestino Ravutaumada	(winger)	22 Jul 2023	v Tonga at Lautoka
775	Lekima Tagitagivalu	(lock)	22 Jul 2023	v Tonga at Lautoka
776	Meli Derenalagi	(back row)	29 Jul 2023	v Samoa at Apia
777	Ilaisa Droasese	(fullback)	29 Jul 2023	v Samoa at Apia
778	Iosefo Masi	(centre)	29 Jul 2023	v Samoa at Apia
779	Vilive Miramira	(back row)	29 Jul 2023	v Samoa at Apia
780	Joseva Tamani	(back row)	29 Jul 2023	v Samoa at Apia
781	Jone Koroiduadua	(prop)	19 Aug 2023	v France at Nantes
782	Peniasi Dakuwaqa	(winger)	5 Jul 2024	v Georgia at Batumi
783	Kitione Salawa	(back row)	5 Jul 2024	v Georgia at Batumi
784	Inia Tabuavou	(centre)	5 Jul 2024	v Georgia at Batumi
785	Isaiah Armstrong-Ravula	(fly half)	5 Jul 2024	v Georgia at Batumi
786	Elia Canakaivata	(back row)	5 Jul 2024	v Georgia at Batumi
