= 1997 Rugby World Cup Sevens squads =

The teams which took part at the 1997 Rugby World Cup Sevens held in Hong Kong named squads of ten players each.

== Pool A ==
=== England ===
1. Adedayo Adebayo
2. Neil Back
3. Nick Beal
4. Mike Catt
5. Austin Healey
6. Richard Hill
7. Tim Rodber
8. Dave Scully
9. Chris Sheasby
10. Jonathan Sleightholme

=== Canada ===
- Head Coach: Doug Tate
1. Rob Card
2. Gregor Dixon
3. Barry Ebl
4. John Graf
5. Jason Hartley
6. Dave Lougheed
7. Mike Schmid
8. Winston Stanley
9. Scott Stewart
10. Ron Toews

=== Zimbabwe ===
1. Ryan Bekker
2. Craig Brown
3. Innocent Chidziva
4. Patrick Ewing
5. Campbell Graham
6. Isaac Mbereko
7. Charlton McNab
8. Victor Olonga
9. William Schultz
10. Kennedy Tsimba

== Pool B ==
=== Romania ===
1. Gabriel Brezoianu
2. Vasile Brici
3. Lucian Colceriu
4. Constantin Dragnea
5. Cătălin Drăguceanu
6. Alin Petrache
7. Margant Rădoi
8. Lucian Sîrbu
9. Gheorghe Solomie
10. Sorin Trancă

=== Australia ===
1. Michael Brial (NSW Waratahs)
2. David Campese (NSW Waratahs)
3. Ryan Constable (QLD Reds)
4. David Kelaher
5. Stephen Larkham (ACT Brumbies)
6. John Moss
7. Matthew Mostyn
8. Damian Smith (QLD Reds)
9. Semi Taupeaafe (NSW Waratahs)
10. Roy Wayne Williams

=== Scotland ===
1. Nick Broughton
2. Graeme Burns
3. James Craig
4. Cameron Glasgow
5. Duncan Hodge
6. Derrick Lee
7. Cameron Mather
8. Scott Nichol
9. Sikeli Votonisoga
10. Murray Wallace

== Pool C ==
=== New Zealand ===
Coach: (New Zealand) Gordon Tietjens

1. Alama Ieremia
2. Glen Osborne
3. Caleb Ralph
4. Roger Randle
5. Eric Rush
6. Owen Scrimgeour
7. Joe Tauiwi
8. Rua Tipoki
9. Nick Penny
10. Peter Woods

=== Japan ===
Head Coach: (Fiji) Paulo Nawalu

1. Hiroyuki Kajihara
2. Shinji Ono
3. Bruce Ferguson
4. Takeomi Ito
5. Hiroyuki Tanuma
6. Kiyoshi Imazumi
7. Kensuke Iwabuchi
8. Daisuke Ohata
9. Stephen Miln
10. Hiroki Ozeki

=== Tonga ===
1. Maama Molitika
2. Siua Taumalolo
3. Ofa Topeni
4. Tevita Tuʻifua
5. Viliami Uhi
6. Tevita Vaʻenuku
7. Lui Veseseyaki
8. William Fakaʻosi
9. Sione Moa Latu
10. Saia Moeakiolo
11. Isi Fatani

== Pool D ==
=== Fiji ===
1. Manasa Bari
2. Leveni Duvuduvukula
3. Luke Erenavula
4. Lemeki Koroi
5. Inoke Maraiwai
6. Tamiela Naikelekele
7. Waisale Serevi
8. Aminiasi Naituyaga
9. Jope Tuikabe
10. Marika Vunibaka

=== Portugal ===
1. Miguel Barbosa
2. Jon Dingley
3. Vasco Durão
4. José Maria Vilar Gomes
5. Rohan Hoffmann
6. João Diogo Marques
7. Nuno Mourão
8. Pedro Murinello
9. Pedro Netto Fernandes
10. Luís Pissarra
11. Miguel Sá

=== Hong Kong ===
- Head Coach: (New Zealand) George Simpkin
1. Hamish Bowden
2. Robin Bredbury
3. Fuk Ping Chan
4. Riaz Fredericks
5. Vaughan Going
6. Steve Kidd
7. Stuart Krohn
8. Rodney McIntosh
9. Luke Nabaro
10. Rob Santos
11. Isi Tuivai

== Pool E ==
=== France ===
1. Philippe Bernat-Salles
2. Olivier Campan
3. Franck Corrihons
4. Marc Lièvremont
5. Thomas Lièvremont
6. Olivier Magne
7. Ugo Mola
8. Meli Nakauta
9. Mickaël Noël
10. Frédéric Séguier
11. Willy Taofifénua

=== United States ===
Head Coach: Mark Williams

1. Vaea Anitoni
2. Andre Bachelet
3. Jim Burgett
4. Jon Campbell
5. Malakai Delai
6. Brian Gallagher
7. Brian Hightower
8. Dan Lyle
9. Chris Morrow
10. Richard Tardits (c)

=== South Korea ===
1. Chae Deuk-Joon
2. Cho Jin-Sik
3. Choi Chang-Yul
4. Kim Jae-Hyun
5. Kim Sung-Nam
6. Lee Keun-Wook
7. Park Jin-Bae
8. Sung Hae-Kyung
9. Yong Hwan-Myung
10. Yoo Min-Suk

== Pool F ==
=== Spain ===
Coach: (France) Gérard Murillo

1. Álvar Enciso
2. Pablo Calderón
3. Jon Azkargorta
4. Francisco Puertas Soto
5. Oriol Ripol
6. Alberto Socías
7. Carlos Souto
8. Philippe Tayeb
9. Jorge Torres
10. Ferrán Velazco

=== Cook Islands ===
1. Bryan Adams
2. Amosa Amosa
3. Grand Hagai
4. Save Lutumailagi
5. David Nekeare
6. Ryan Nicholas
7. Junior Charlie Noo
8. Terry Piri
9. Anthony Ruakere
10. Peter Tari
11. Aquila Tunisau
12. Alan Tyrrell

=== Morocco ===
1. Mohamed Ahlalou
2. Yassine Alami
3. My Omar Nasrallah Alaoui
4. Hamid Amina
5. Aziz Andoh
6. Faycal Boukanoucha
7. Kazu Bouzedi
8. Mohamed Dermouni
9. Redouane Habbal
10. Abdelaziz Mesror
11. Carl Murray

== Pool G ==
=== Ireland ===
- Head Coach: Ray Southam
1. Jonny Bell
2. Ben Cronin
3. Kieron Dawson
4. Denis Hickie
5. David Humphreys
6. Niall Malone
7. Denis McBride
8. Eric Miller
9. Richard Wallace
10. Niall Woods

=== Argentina ===
- Head Coach: Bernardo Otaño
1. Lisandro Arbizu (Belgrano Athletic)
2. Pablo Bouza (Duendes)
3. Gonzalo Camardón (Alumni)
4. Gonzalo García (Duendes)
5. Marcos Garicoche (CA San Isidro)
6. Leandro Lobrauco (Atlético del Rosario)
7. Santiago Phelan (CA San Isidro)
8. Eduardo Simone (Liceo Naval)
9. Facundo Soler (Tala RC)
10. Cristian Viel (Newman)

=== South Africa ===
- Head Coach: Dawie Snyman
1. Graeme Bouwer
2. Stephen Brink
3. Jacques Olivier
4. Breyton Paulse
5. Pieter Rossouw
6. Bobby Skinstad
7. André Snyman
8. Jeffrey Stevens
9. Joost van der Westhuizen (c)
10. Andre Venter

== Pool H ==
=== Namibia ===
1. Johan Britz
2. Dirk Farmer
3. André Greeff
4. Kobus Horn
5. Quinn Hough
6. Gerhard Mans
7. Jaco Olivier
8. Ronaldo Pedro
9. Schalk van der Merwe
10. Johan Zaayman

=== Samoa ===
1. Kalolo Toleafoa
2. Isaac Fe'aunati
3. Rudolf Moors
4. Brian Lima
5. Tainafi Patu
6. Afato So'oalo
7. Terry Fanolua
8. Sila Vaifale
9. Laiafi Papali'i
10. Semo Sititi

=== Wales ===
1. Allan Bateman
2. Darren Edwards
3. Jason Forster
4. Dafydd James
5. Kevin Morgan
6. Wayne Proctor
7. Jamie Ringer
8. Gareth Thomas
9. Christopher Wyatt
10. Gareth Wyatt
