= Akuila =

Akuila is a given name. Notable people with the given name include:

- Akuila Mafi (born 1969), Tasmanian-raised Tongan rugby union player
- Akuila Matanibukaca (born 1979), Fijian rugby union player
- Akuila Rokolisoa (born 1995), Fijian rugby union player
- Akuila Savu (1944–2014), Fijian economist
- Akuila Uate (born 1987), Fijian rugby union player
- Akuila Yabaki (fl. 2000), Fijian human rights activist
