= Tuilevu =

Tuilevu is a Fijian surname. Notable people with the surname include:

- Aisea Tuilevu (born 1972), Fijian rugby union player
- Jeremaiya Tuilevu Tamanisau (born 1982), Fijian rugby union player
