= Jimi Damu =

- Born: James Vulavou Damu; 15 August 1962 Savusavu, Fiji
- Died: 9 October 2018 (aged 56) Auckland, New Zealand
- Height: 5 ft 10 in (1.78 m)
- Weight: 198 lb (90 kg)
- Notable relative: Ilaitia Damu (brother)

Rugby union career
- Position: Wing
Amateur team(s)
Years	Team	Apps	(Points)
- Grammar Carlton
Provincial / State sides
Years	Team	Apps	(Points)
1984–1991	Auckland	15	(36)
International career
Years	Team	Apps	(Points)
1985–1987	Fiji	4	(14)

James Vulavou Damu, known as Jimi Damu (15 July 1967 in Savusavu – 9 October 2018) was a New Zealand–based Fijian rugby union player. He played as wing.

== Career ==
His first international cap was against Ireland XV, at Lansdowne Road, on 19 October 1985.

He was part of the 1987 Rugby World Cup roster. In the tournament he only played the quarter-final against France, at Auckland and scored a try. He was not called since after Fiji's defeat against France in the 1987 World Cup. In the squad he was the only player non residing in Fiji, as required by the selection policy at the time. In the National Provincial Championship he played for Auckland.

Damu also played for Fiji Bitter Marist Sevens.

At the time of the 2011 Rugby World Cup, Damu, along with his brother Ilaitia and former Flying Fijians Koli Rakoroi, Acura Niuqila, Willie Rokowailoa, Inoke Male and Isikeli Tikoduadua formed a committee called Ex-Fiji Reps with a campaign to raise $3 million in less than six months time in order to assist Fiji's preparation for the 2011 Rugby World Cup.
