= Masirewa =

Masirewa is a surname. Notable people with the surname include:

- Semisi Masirewa (born 1992), Fijian rugby union player
- Waisiki Masirewa (born 1966), Fijian rugby union player
