= Sailosi =

Sailosi is a masculine given name. Notable people with the name include:

- Sailosi Kepa, Fijian statesman
- Sailosi Tagicakibau (born 1982), Fijian rugby union wing
- Sailosi Rabonaqica (born 1986), Fijian rugby union flanker
- Sailosi Vukalokalo, Fijian rugby union lock
