= Leone Ravuetaki =

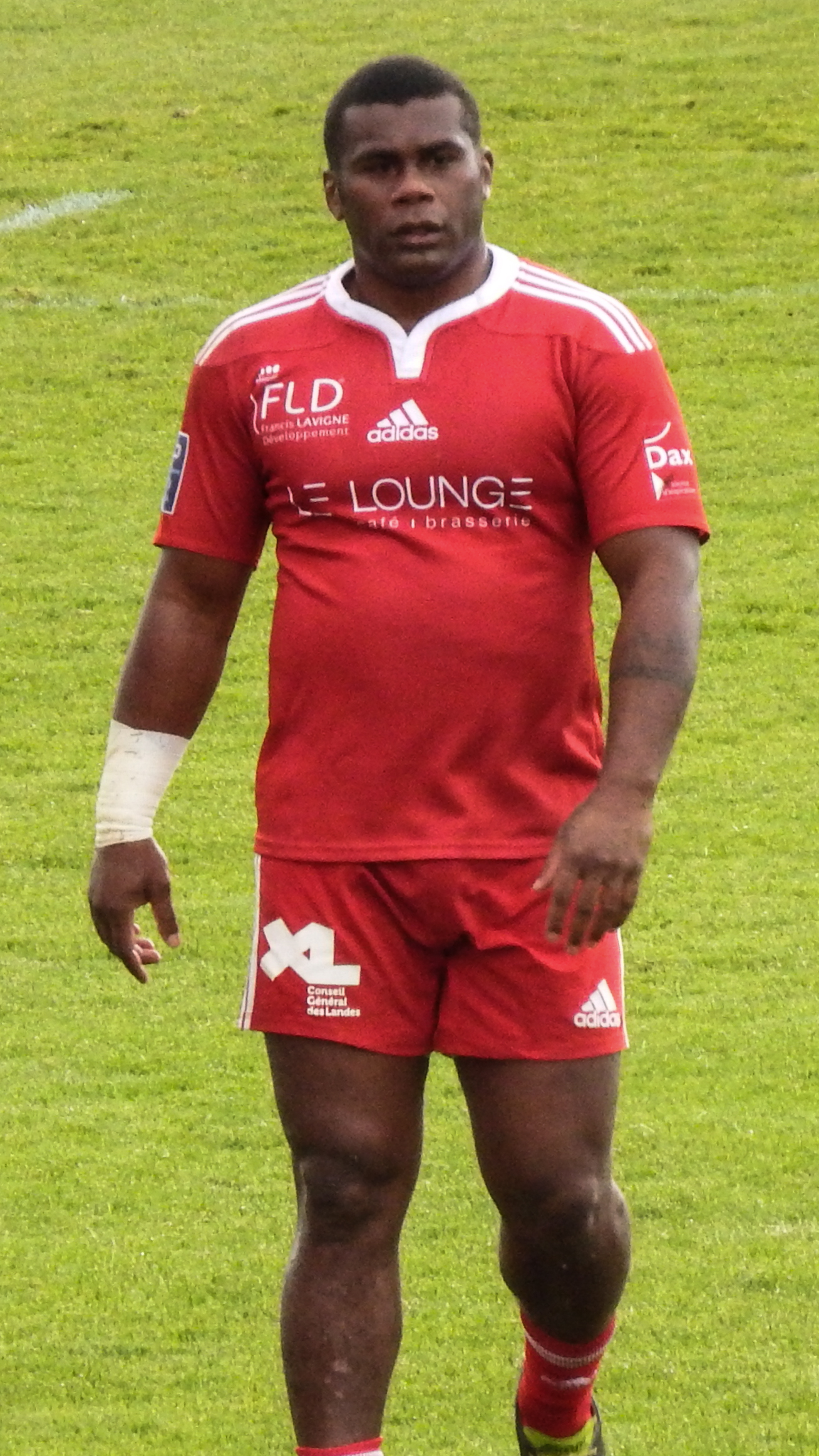
- Full name: Leone Ravuetaki Tubuarua
- Born: 10 March 1986 (age 40)
- Height: 5 ft 11 in (180 cm)
- Weight: 231 lb (105 kg)

Rugby union career
- Position: Centre
Senior career
Years	Team	Apps	(Points)
2014–15	US Dax		
2015–18	RC Narbonne		
2018–20	Biarritz Olympique		
2020–21	CA Périgueux		
International career
Years	Team	Apps	(Points)
2013	Fiji	3	(0)

Leone Ravuetaki Tubuarua (born 10 March 1986) is a Fijian professional rugby union player.

== Rugby union career ==
Ravuetaki, a powerful centre, had a background in rugby sevens before gaining three caps with the Flying Fijians in the 2013 IRB Pacific Nations Cup, which Fiji won for the first time. He has been based in France since 2014, playing in the country's second-tier competition, the Pro D2, with US Dax, RC Narbonne and Biarritz Olympique.

== See also ==
- List of Fiji national rugby union players
