= Jimilai Nakaidawa =

Fijian rugby union footballer (born 1985)

- Born: 5 August 1985 (age 41) Vunidawa, Fiji
- Height: 1.83 m (6 ft 0 in)
- Weight: 105 kg (16 st 7 lb)

Rugby union career
- Position: Flanker
- Current team: Pacific Fiji Warriors
International career
Years	Team	Apps	(Points)
2009 – present	Fiji	3	(5)

Jimilai Nakaidawa (born 5 August 1985 in Fiji) is a Fijian rugby union footballer. He plays at flanker.

== Career ==
Nakaidawa's first test for his country was against Romania at Bucharest on 28 November 2009. He has further been selected to play for the Fijian Warriors in 2010.

== See also ==
- Fiji Rugby Team
- Fiji Rugby Union Players
