= Sale Sorovaki =

Fiji international rugby union player (born 1969)

- Full name: Sale C. Sorovaki
- Born: 6 October 1969 (age 57) Kadavu, Fiji
- Height: 6 ft 2 in (188 cm)
- Weight: 204 lb (93 kg)
- University: Massey University

Rugby union career
- Position: Centre / Wing
Provincial / State sides
Years	Team	Apps	(Points)
1993–94	Wellington	5	(5)
International career
Years	Team	Apps	(Points)
1995–98	Fiji	19	(10)

Sale Sorovaki (born 6 October 1969) is a Fijian former rugby union international.

Born in Kadavu, Sorovaki attended Massey University from 1988 to 1992. He played rugby for the university and was a Wellington provincial representative, before having a stint in Japanese rugby with Kintetsu.

Sorovaki was a centre on the Fiji national team between 1995 and 1998, gaining 19 caps.

After retiring, Sorovaki transitioned into coaching and sports administration, also working in television commentary. He was Fiji's Chef de Mission at the 2022 Commonwealth Games in Birmingham.

Sorovaki's wife Ruby-Ann is a daughter of former Fiji prime minister Frank Bainimarama.

== See also ==
- List of Fiji national rugby union players
