= Maku Koroiyadi =

Fijian rugby union player (born 1981)

- Full name: Makulusio Koroiyadi
- Born: 1 March 1981 (age 45) Suva, Fiji
- Height: 6 ft 1 in (185 cm)
- Weight: 246 lb (112 kg)

Rugby union career
- Position: Scrum-half
International career
Years	Team	Apps	(Points)
2013	Fiji	1	(0)

Makulusio Koroiyadi (born 1 March 1981) is a Fijian former rugby union international.

Born in Suva, Koroiyadi was a Fiji under-18 captain, capped once for the Flying Fijians, as a substitute scrum-half in a 2013 fixture against the Barbarians at Twickenham, put on to celebrate the Fiji Rugby Union's centenary year.

Koroiyadi played rugby in England for the Army, Combined Services and Bury St Edmunds.

== See also ==
- List of Fiji national rugby union players
