= Niko Qoro =

- Born: 9 September 1969 (age 57) Tavua, Fiji
- Height: 6 ft 1 in (185 cm)
- Weight: 252 lb (114 kg)

Rugby union career
- Position: Prop
International career
Years	Team	Apps	(Points)
1996–99	Fiji	10	(0)

Niko Qoro (born 9 September 1969) is a Fijian former rugby union international who represented Fiji in 10 Test matches.

Qoro, a prop from Lautoka, was a fisherman by profession when he made his debut against Hong Kong in 1996. He was a member of Fiji's squad for the 1999 Rugby World Cup in Wales, without featuring in any match.

In 2014, Qoro served as head coach of the Lautoka rugby team.

== See also ==
- List of Fiji national rugby union players
