= Saimoni Rokini =

Fijian rugby union footballer (born 1972)

- Born: 9 December 1972 (age 53)
- Height: 1.88 m (6 ft 2 in)
- Weight: 89 kg (196 lb; 14.0 st)

Rugby union career
- Position(s): Wing, Centre
International career
Years	Team	Apps	(Points)
2000–2003	Fiji	10	(5)

Saimoni Rokini (born 9 December 1972) is a Fijian rugby union footballer. He plays as a centre. His nickname is Rocky.

He is 1.88m tall and weighs 89 kg. He scored a try on his debut in the Epson Cup clash against Japan in May 2000 after some fine early season form with Suva had caught former coach Greg Smith's attention.

He has played two seasons of sevens with the national team, winning in Hong Kong in 1998 and 1999. In August 2000, he played for the Penguins when they won the Middlesex Charity 7s at Twickenham. He also provided ideal backline cover in 2001 following injuries to Marika Vunibaka, Vilimoni Delasau and Seremaia Bai, eventually securing a regular run-on spot at centre in the Pacific Rim finals in Japan where he came into his own in some physically demanding matches. He was recalled into the Fiji sevens team to Hong Kong in 2004 where he skippered the team. He is also a cousin of Fiji sevens coach, Waisale Serevi.
