= Stuart Krohn =

American rugby union player

Personal information
- Born: November 9, 1962 (age 63) Durham, North Carolina
- Education: University of Colorado Boulder; University of California, Santa Barbara; Dartmouth College

Sport
- Sport: Rugby union
- Position: forward/backrower/No. 8
- University team: Colorado Buffaloes; UC Santa Barbara Gauchos
- Team: Kronenbourg RFC; Stade Toulousain; North Shore Rugby Football Club; College Rovers; Valley RFC

Stuart Krohn (born November 9, 1962) is an American former professional rugby union player. At the University of California, Santa Barbara, he was an All-American in 1986. In Hong Kong, he played for Valley RFC for eight years, as the team won eight consecutive championships, and captained the international team at the 1993 Rugby World Cup Sevens and the 1997 Rugby World Cup Sevens. Krohn was a member of the silver medal winning USA Men's Rugby Team at the 1993 Maccabiah Games in Israel, and a member of the gold medal winning team at the 1997 Maccabiah Games.

== Youth and college ==
Krohn was born in Durham, North Carolina. Krohn started playing rugby at the University of Colorado Boulder, for the Colorado Buffaloes in 1980. He transferred to the University of California, Santa Barbara (UCSB), and played rugby there for the UC Santa Barbara Gauchos. For his junior year, he went to study in France, where he played rugby, leading to a professional contract with Kronenbourg RFC in 1984. He dropped out of school to play rugby for a second year in France in 1985, for Stade Toulousain, and won the French National Rugby Championship with the team. Then he returned to UCSB and was the player-coach of the team. He was an All-American in 1986. In 1987, he graduated from UCSB with a bachelor’s degree in History.

== Rugby career ==
He then went to New Zealand and played for the North Shore Rugby Football Club for two years. Krohn next went to Durban, South Africa, and played for the College Rovers professional rugby club for two years.

Krohn went to Hong Kong where he was a Hong Kong international and played at forward/backrower/No. 8 for Valley RFC for eight years, as the team won eight consecutive championships. There, he captained the international team at two Rugby World Cup Sevens. He was a member of Hong Kong's Plate-winning side at the 1992 Sevens. He played on the Hong Kong 1993 Rugby World Cup Sevens squad in Pool D, and the Hong Kong 1997 Rugby World Cup Sevens squad in Pool D.

Then, Krohn returned to the US and completed a master's degree graduate program in creative writing at Dartmouth College while coaching Dartmouth Rugby there. In 1993, he began and directed a youth rugby program in South Los Angeles, California, as part of the Inner City Education Foundation. In 1999, Krohn started coaching and playing for the Santa Monica Rugby Club.

At the 1993 Maccabiah Games in Israel, Krohn was a member of the silver medal winning USA Men's Rugby Team, at the 1997 Maccabiah Games he was a member of the gold medal winning team, and at the 2005 Maccabiah Games he was Head Coach of the silver medal winning team.

He has a wife, Kazuki, and a daughter, Sakura.

== Halls of fame ==
In 2014 Krohn was inducted into the Southern California Jewish Sports Hall of Fame, and in 2015 he was inducted into the Hong Kong Rugby Football Union’s Hall of Fame. In 2018, he was inducted into the Maccabi USA Rugby Hall of Fame.
