= Seva Rokobaro =

- Full name: Sevanaia Rauqe Rokobaro
- Born: 2 October 1978 (age 48) Suva, Fiji
- Height: 6 ft 4 in (193 cm)
- Weight: 252 lb (114 kg)

Rugby union career
- Position: Lock
International career
Years	Team	Apps	(Points)
2004–05	Fiji	4	(0)

Sevanaia Rauqe Rokobaro (born 2 October 1978) is a Fijian former international rugby union player.

A back-rower and lock, Rokobaro was capped four times for Fiji from 2004 to 2005. He made all of his appearances off the bench, which included a Test against the All Blacks at North Harbour Stadium.

Rokobaro is a former Sydney Shute Shield rugby player for Gordon and Parramatta. He played rugby in France from 2008 to 2012, with US Marmande, CA Périgueux, Pays d'Aix and RC Toulon, the latter in the Top 14. Moving to the Hunter Region in 2015, Rokobaro joined the Hamilton Hawks, a club he was still playing with into his 40s.

== See also ==
- List of Fiji national rugby union players
