= Sekove Leawere =

- Born: 14 August 1981 (age 45)
- Height: 6 ft 1 in (185 cm)
- Weight: 211 lb (96 kg)
- School: Navosa Central College
- Notable relative: Kele Leawere (brother)

Rugby union career
- Position: Centre / Wing
International career
Years	Team	Apps	(Points)
2003–06	Fiji	5	(10)

Sekove Leawere (born 14 August 1981) is a Fijian former rugby union international.

Leawere, educated at Navosa Central College, is the younger brother of Fiji international lock Kele Leawere.

Mainly a winger, Leawere played rugby union in Japan at Toyota Verblitz for several seasons, while in Fiji he competed for both Navosa and Nadroga. Between 2003 and 2006, he was capped five times for the national team, scoring two tries.

Leawere also played in Fiji's national rugby league competition.

== See also ==
- List of Fiji national rugby union players
