= Tailevu Knights =

- Union: Fiji Rugby Union
- Coach: Iosefo Bele
- Captain: Isaac Mow
- League: Colonial Cup

The Tailevu Knights is a Fijian former rugby union team that had a franchise area coverering Tailevu, Northland, and Rewa.The team played in Fiji's premier competition the Colonial Cup from 2004 to 2008 before the competition ceased in 2008.

== History ==
The franchise was one of four original teams created for the inaugural Colonial Cup in 2004.

== Coaching team ==
- Coach: Iosefo Bele
- Team manager: Opetaia Ravai
- Captain: Isaac Mow

Eddy Waqa was the team's coach in 2008.

== Roster ==
- 15 Malakai Bakaniceva
- 14 Epeli Ruivadra
- 13 Fero Tabaki
- 12 Isaac Mow (capt)
- 11 Maleli Bula
- 10 Luke Rogoyawa
- 9 Netani Koroi
- 8 Romuluse Ratukana
- 7 Viliame Maya
- 6 Peni Tora
- 5 Kevurieli Bulivorovoro
- 4 Langi Peters
- 3 Mosese Sela
- 2 Vereniki Sauturaga
- 1 Isei Colati
