= Alipate Ratini =

Fiji international rugby union player

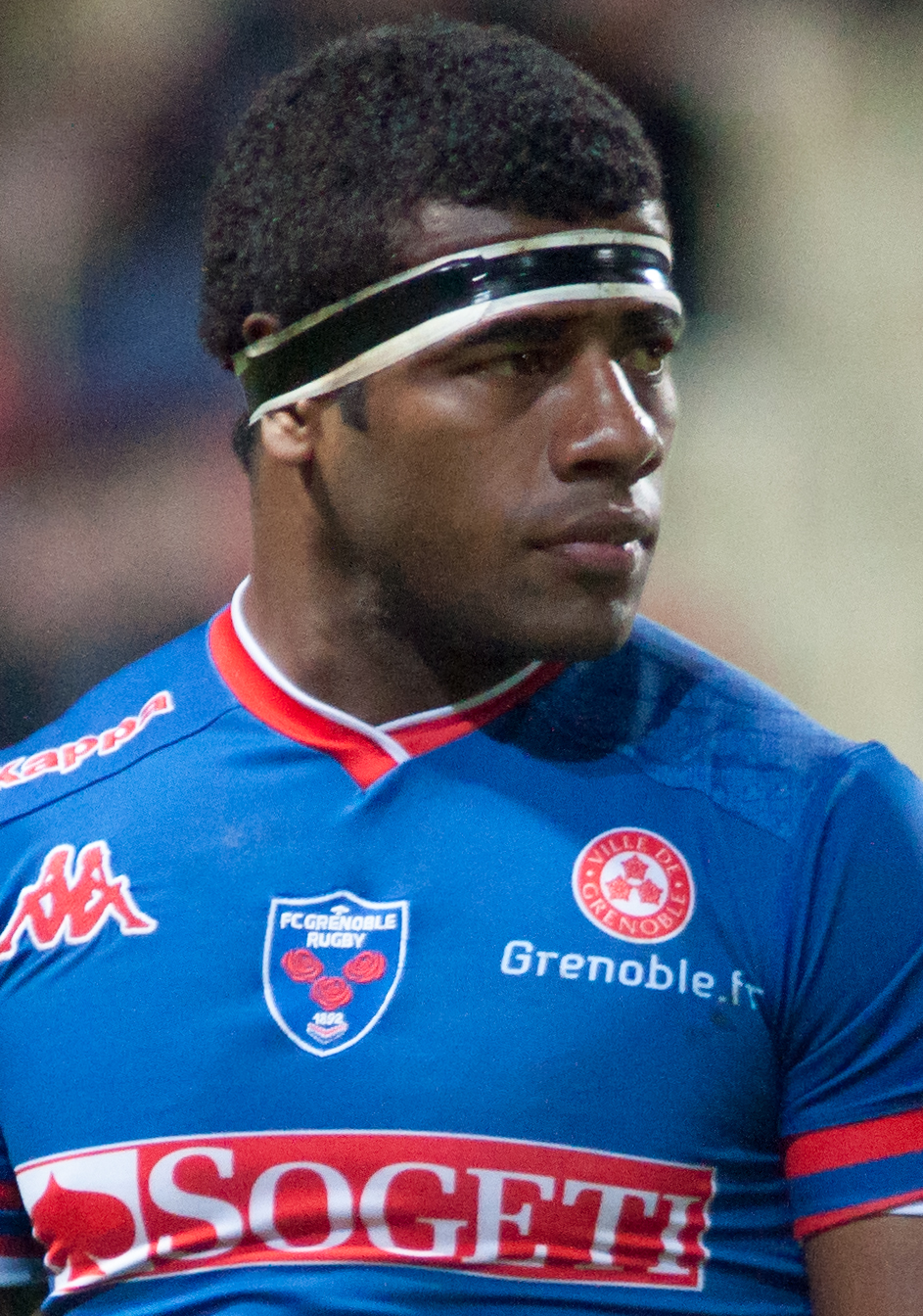
- Born: Ratu Alipate Ratini; February 17, 1991 (age 35) Namosi, Fiji
- Height: 1.82 m (6 ft 0 in)
- Weight: 92 kg (14 st 7 lb; 203 lb)
- Notable relative: Marika Koroibete (cousin)

Rugby union career
- Position: Wing
- Current team: Stade Français Paris
Senior career
Years	Team	Apps	(Points)
2013-2015	FC Grenoble	35	(85)
2015-2016	Stade Rochelais	3	(0)
2016-2017	USA Perpignan	15	(40)
2017-2018	AS Beziers	10	(30)
International career
Years	Team	Apps	(Points)
2014−	Fiji	1	(51t)
- Correct as of 10 August 2017
National sevens team
Years	Team		Comps
2012	Fiji		2011–12

Ratu Alipate Ratini (born February 17, 1991) in Namosi, Suva is a Fijian rugby union and rugby league footballer. He played wing for Fiji and previously for French Top 14 side Grenoble. He is also a former high school sprint champion with a time of 10.7secs in the 100m. In January 2016, he signed for another Top 14 side, La Rochelle. He signed for Stade Français Paris at the end of that season.

== Career ==
Ratini was first discovered by former Flying Fijians head coach Inoke Male who found him playing at a local tournament in Vanua Levu. He joined the Vatukoula rugby team before getting selected to the Fiji under-20 in 2012 and alter joining the Fiji Warriors team. He first made his mark in the local 7's circuit playing for Namosi before getting selected by the Fiji 7's coach, Alifereti Dere. He made his 7's debut for Fiji the 2012 Gold Coast Sevens. He scored 7 tries in that tournament. He was dropped from the Fiji 7's team for the next leg due to injury.

In December 2012, he signed a National Rugby League contract with the Cronulla Sharks who were impressed with him after the Gold coast sevens. He didn't get a chance to play in the 2013 NRL season but played in a few NSW Cup games. He joined Top 14 side Grenoble after not being able to make the Sharks starting side. He made his Top 14 debut against Biarritz in September 2013. He scored 2 tries against the Wasps in the Amlin Challenge Cup.

In May 2013, he returned to Fiji to try to win his place back to represent the Fiji 7's team at the 2013 Rugby World Cup Sevens.

After an impressive outing, he led the try tally for Grenoble in the 2014–15 Top 14 season with 7 tries in 7 starts.

He was named by Fiji coach, John McKee in the national team for the 2014 end-of-year rugby union internationals and would make a poor international debut for Fiji against France but did score his first try.

In July 2015, he was fired by Grenoble because of poor behaviour.

In January 2016, he was signed on by La Rochelle for the remainder of the 2015–16 Top 14 season. In June 2016, he signed a one-year deal with another Top14 side, Stade Français Paris.

He was dropped by Stade Français Paris as well after more indiscipline issues and was picked by 3rd division side USA Perpignan.

In August 2017, Perpignan also dropped him after 11 games and 7 tries citing indiscipline.
