= Daniel Rouse =

Fiji international rugby union player (born 1972)

- Full name: Daniel Maxwell Rouse
- Born: 1 May 1972 (age 54) Suva, Fiji
- Height: 6 ft 3 in (1.91 m)
- Weight: 246 lb (112 kg)

Rugby union career
- Position: No. 8 / Prop
International career
Years	Team	Apps	(Points)
1995–99	Fiji	28	(5)

Daniel Maxwell Rouse (born 1 May 1972) is a Fijian former rugby union international who represented Fiji in 28 Test matches from 1995 to 1999.

Suva-born Rouse played as a number eight for his local club Nadi and in his early Test matches, before making the switch to prop. He was a member of Fiji's squad at the 1999 Rugby World Cup, featuring in all four matches. The quarter-final play-off loss to England at Twickenham was Rouse's final Test appearance.

Rouse's rugby union career included a stint with English club Harlequins. He was a British passport holder and had received his education at Dover College during the 1980s.

== See also ==
- List of Fiji national rugby union players
