= Tevita Latianara =

- Full name: Ratu Tevita Visawaqa Latianara
- Born: 21 May 1980 (age 46) Suva, Fiji
- Height: 6 ft 0 in (183 cm)
- Weight: 198 lb (90 kg)

Rugby union career
- Position: Wing
International career
Years	Team	Apps	(Points)
2002	Fiji	2	(5)

Ratu Tevita Visawaqa Latianara (born 21 May 1980) is a Fijian former international rugby union player.

A winger, Latianara was capped twice for Fiji national team in 2002 and scored a try on debut in a win over Samoa at Apia, while his other appearance came a week later against Tonga. His twin brother Ratu Aseri Qorovakarua Latianara competed in French professional rugby and the pair played together for Nadi. He also played for the Airport Rugby Club of Nadi.

== See also ==
- List of Fiji national rugby union players
