= Meli Nakauta =

Fiji international rugby union player (born 1971)

- Born: 13 October 1971 (age 55)
- Height: 6 ft 1 in (1.85 m)
- Weight: 204 lb (93 kg)

Rugby union career
- Position: Centre
International career
Years	Team	Apps	(Points)
1998–99	Fiji	9	(5)

Meli Nakauta (born 13 October 1971) is a Fijian former rugby union international who represented Fiji in nine Test matches during the late 1990s.

Nakauta played much of his rugby in Sydney and won a Shute Shield title with Manly in 1997, earning Man of the Match honours in the grand final. He also appeared for Parramatta, Drummoyne, Gordon and Warringah during his career.

Nakauta also played for Sri Lankan Rugby Champs Kandy Sports Club in the 90's

A centre, Nakauta debuted for Fiji in 1998 and was a member of the side at the 1999 Rugby World Cup. He scored a last-minute consolation try in Fiji's World Cup quarter-final play-off loss to England at Twickenham.

== See also ==
- List of Fiji national rugby union players
