= Seremaia Bai =

Fiji international rugby union player

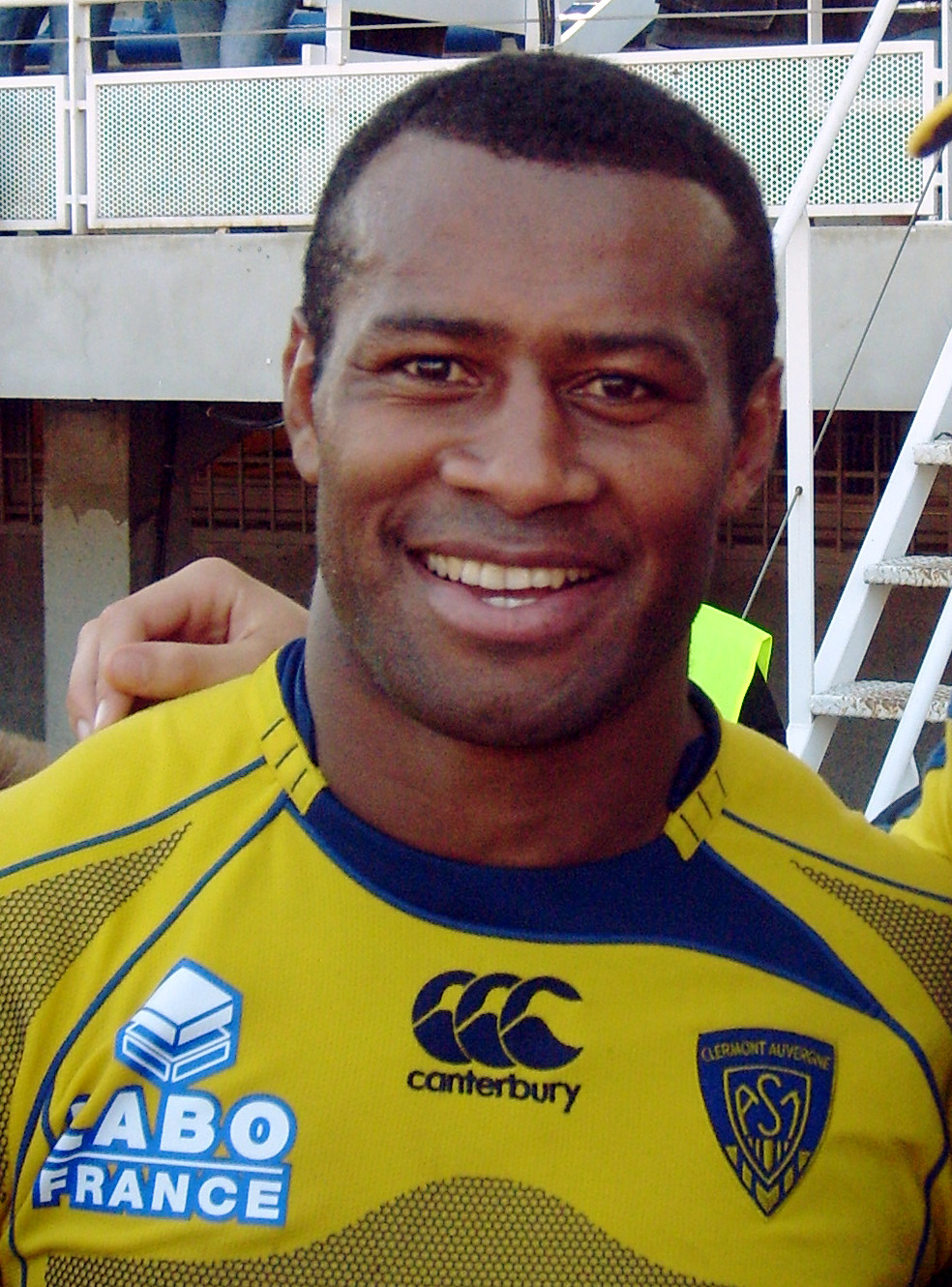
- Born: Seremaia Baïkeinuku; 4 January 1979 (age 47) Nausori, Fiji
- Height: 1.87 m (6 ft 2 in)
- Weight: 100 kg (15 st 10 lb; 220 lb)
- School: Lelean Memorial School
- Notable relative: Setareki Koroilagilagi (brother)

Rugby union career
- Position(s): Inside centre, Fly-half
Senior career
Years	Team	Apps	(Points)
1997–1999	Eastern Suburbs		
1999–2001	Tailevu Knights		
2001–2002	Cross Keys		
2002–2004	Southland		
2005–2006	Secom Rugguts		
2006–2009	Clermont Auvergne	94	(207)
2010–2014	Castres Olympique	93	(91)
2014-2016	Leicester Tigers	27	(15)
International career
Years	Team	Apps	(Points)
2000–2016	Fiji	53	(321)
2004–2008	Pacific Islanders	8	(35)
2006	Fiji Barbarians	4	(32)
- Correct as of 24 June 2016
National sevens team
Years	Team		Comps
2002	Fiji		Japan

Seremaia Baïkeinuku (born 4 January 1979) is a retired Fijian rugby union player who played most recently for Leicester Tigers in the Aviva Premiership, and represented Fiji at a National level. He plays at both Fly-half and Inside Centre.

== Career ==
Seremaia Bai finished his career playing for Leicester Tigers after joining them in 2014. He previously played for Castres Olympique and ASM Clermont Auvergne who both competed in France's Top 14 competition. He also plays for the Fiji national team and the Pacific Islanders. He has played under-19s, under 21s and under 23s for the Fiji national side. Bai attended Lelean Memorial School in Nausori, Fiji.

He made his international debut for Fiji in 2000 in a match against Japan which Fiji won 47–22. That year he was also capped against Samoa, the USA, Canada and Italy. In 2001, he was capped three times, twice against Tonga, and once against Samoa. In the second match against Tonga he broke his ankle. In 2002, he joined Southland for the National Provincial Championship, and went on tour with Fiji for the November Test series in the northern hemisphere.

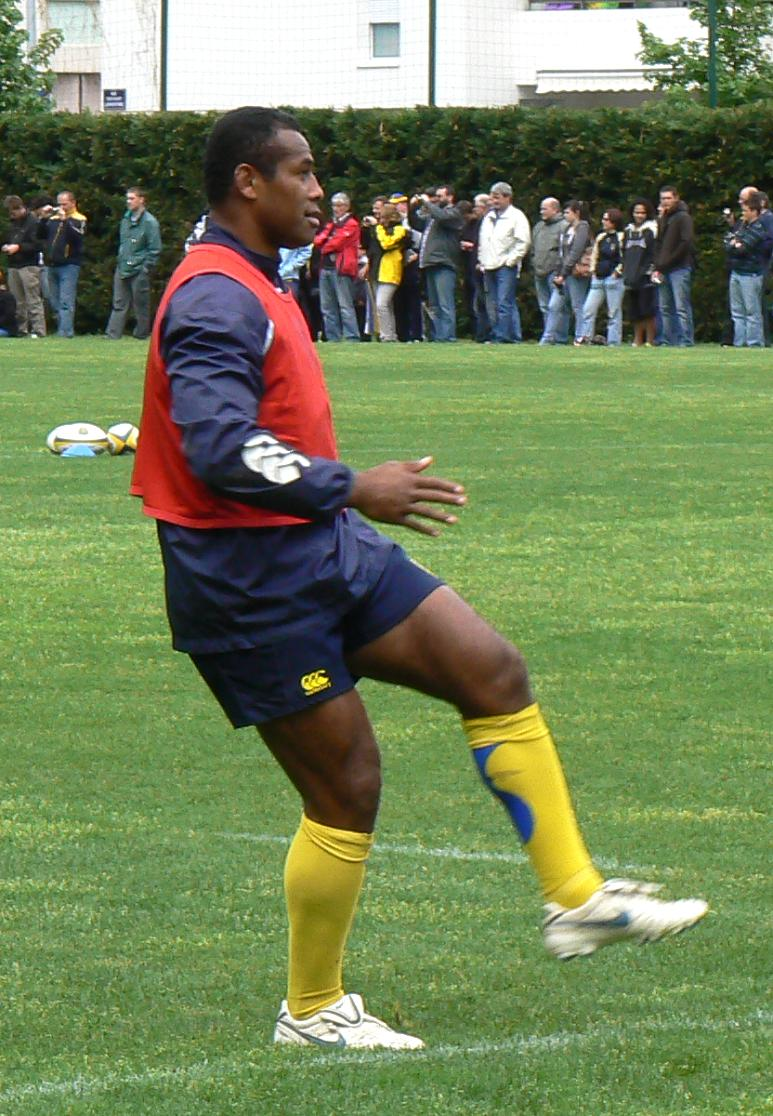
Bai training with Clermont Auvergne.

He was not included in Fiji's squad for the 2003 Rugby World Cup in Australia, but returned in 2004 for Fiji in two matches in June, against Tonga and Samoa. He was included in the combined Pacific Islanders team that toured the southern nations. He also played numerous international matches the following season.

In 2006, he captained the Tailevu Knights for the 2006 Colonial Cup, and then signed with Clermont Auvergne in France. He played for Fiji in the Pacific Nations Cup, and was then selected for the 2006 Pacific Islanders squad for the tour of Europe. He went on to play a substantial part of Fiji's quarter-final reaching team at the 2007 Rugby World Cup. In 2008, he was selected to play for the Pacific Islanders in what would be their final tour. In 2009, he was announced as the Fiji captain for their European tour. In 2010, he signed to play for Castres Olympique on a two-year contract. He also competed at the 2011 Rugby World Cup.

His younger brother Setareki Koroilagilagi also has played for the Fiji, and they first played alongside each other in June 2013 against the USA.

In April 2014, he signed a contract with Leicester Tigers.

Seremaia announced his retirement from professional Rugby effective at the end of the 2015/2016 season, with the aim to focus on his BAI (Be An Inspiration) programme, encouraging youngsters into Rugby in his native Fiji

== Honours ==
=== Club ===
(France) Castres

- Top 14: 2012–13

=== Personal ===
In 2025, Bai was inducted into the Pasifika Rugby Hall of Fame.
