= Akuila Matanibukaca =

Fiji international rugby union player (born 1979)

- Born: 19 March 1979 (age 47) Nadi, Fiji
- Height: 6 ft 9 in (206 cm)
- Weight: 273 lb (124 kg)

Rugby union career
- Position: Lock
International career
Years	Team	Apps	(Points)
2005	Fiji	4	(0)

Akuila Matanibukaca (born 19 March 1979) is a Fijian former rugby union international.

Born in Nadi, Matanibukaca was a lock and played in Fijian rugby for the Northern Sharks. He gained four caps for Fiji in 2005, including a Test against the All Blacks, before being curtailed by a serious knee injury.

Matanibukaca, a former Poverty Bay player, was appointed coach of Puketoi in 2012.

== See also ==
- List of Fiji national rugby union players
