= Atunaisa Laqeretabua =

- Died: October 1966 (aged 63)

Rugby union career
- Position: Lock
International career
Years	Team	Apps	(Points)
1924–1938	Fiji	19	(6)

Atunaisa Laqeretabua (died October 1966) was a Fijian rugby union international.

== Biography ==
A lock, Laqeretabua played in Fiji's first-ever international match against Samoa in August 1924. His last match was against New Zealand Maori in August 1938. He played in 19 international matches, scoring two tries.

During World War II he served in the Solomon Islands, becoming a drum major in the Fiji Military Forces. After the war he became a banana farmer.

Laqeretabua died in October 1966 at the age of 63.
