= Darren Edwards =

Welsh rugby union footballer & coach (born 1952)

- Born: 25 March 1974 (age 52) Maesteg, Wales
- Height: 1.72 m (5 ft 8 in)
- Weight: 85 kg (13 st 5 lb)

Rugby union career
- Position: Scrum-half
Senior career
Years	Team	Apps	(Points)
1996–1997	Saracens	1	
1997	Bedford	3	
1997–2000	London Welsh	71	
2000–2001	Newport	6	
2001–2006	London Irish	123	
2006–2008	Leeds	37	
Coaching career
- Years: Team
- 2010: Wales U20
- 2011–2014: Newport Gwent Dragons
- 2014–2019: Bath
- 2019–2020: Wales Sevens
- 2020–2021: Wales Women (interim)
- 2022–2023: Ospreys (defence)
- Correct as of 12 November 2023

Darren Edwards (born 25 March 1974 in Maesteg, Wales) is a former rugby union player. A scrum-half, he was a member of the 2003 Wales national rugby union team and he played for Wales, Wales A, Sevens, Under-21, Students and Under-18 levels. Edwards also played for the Barbarians against England, Scotland and Wales.

== Professional career ==
Edwards began his senior playing career with Saracens in 1996 and joined Newport RFC in 2000, playing 21 times for the club. He also made more than 100 appearances for London Irish and played for Bedford and London Welsh before ending at Leeds Carnegie. He played in the 2002 Powergen Cup Final at Twickenham, as London Irish defeated the Northampton Saints.

Edwards retired from playing at the end of the 2007–2008 season to take up Coaching at Harlequins.

== Coaching career ==
In June 2009 he joined Newport Gwent Dragons as attack coach, replacing Lyn Jones. During 2010 Edwards was head coach of the Wales Under 20 team. In April 2011 Edwards became Newport Gwent Dragons head coach after initially taking the role in a caretaker capacity following the departure of Paul Turner. Edwards left the Dragons in February 2014.

In June 2014 Edwards joined Bath as first team coach. Edwards departed Bath at the end of the 2018–19 Premiership season, taking up a position with Wales Sevens soon after.

Edwards was named as interim head coach of Wales Women in 2020, after the departure of previous head coach Rowland Phillips. His involvement with the team continued in late 2021, assuming the role of skills coach.

In 2022, Edwards joined the Ospreys as defence coach until the end of the season. Ahead of the 2022–23 United Rugby Championship season, this position was made permanent. Edwards had departed the club by the beginning of the 2023–24 season.
