= Sailosi Rabonaqica =

- Born: 2 May 1986 (age 40) Sigatoka, Fiji
- Height: 5 ft 10 in (178 cm)
- Weight: 220 lb (100 kg)
- School: Nadi Muslim College

Rugby union career
- Position: Flanker / No. 8
International career
Years	Team	Apps	(Points)
2008	Fiji	2	(0)

Sailosi Rabonaqica (born 2 May 1986) is a Fijian former international rugby union player.

Rabonaqica hails from Nakalavo village, near Sigatoka, and attended Nadi Muslim College. He represented Fiji in rugby sevens at the 2004 Commonwealth Youth Games, where the team finished in the bronze medal position.

Following a strong Colonial Cup campaign with the Northern Sharks, Rabonaqica made his international debut at the 2008 London Sevens, which was followed soon after by a XV call up to the 2008 IRB Pacific Nations Cup squad, as cover for flanker Akapusi Qera. He came on off the bench in Fiji's matches against Japan and Tonga.

== See also ==
- List of Fiji national rugby union players
