= Tomasi Rabaka =

Fijian rugby union player (1965–2017)

- Born: Tomasi Mawi Rabaka; 5 December 1965 Waikete, Tailevu, Fiji
- Died: 24 July 2017 (aged 51) Vuniyasi, Nadi
- Height: 5 ft 9 in (1.75 m)
- Weight: 176 lb (80 kg)
- Notable relative: Samisoni Rabaka (brother)

Rugby union career
- Position: Fly-half
Senior career
Years	Team	Apps	(Points)
1985-1989	St.Mary's		
1989-1992	Brothers Rugby Club		
1992	Nadi Cavaliers		
International career
Years	Team	Apps	(Points)
1991	Fiji	4	(24)

Tomasi Mawi Rabaka (5 December 1965 in Tailevu – 24 June 2017 in Nadi) was a Fijian rugby union player who played as a fly-half. His brother is Samisoni Rabaka, who was also a Fijian international.

== Career ==
Born in the Waikete village, in Tailevu, Rabaka is the fourth child in a family of 11. He started his rugby career playing for the St.Mary's Rugby Club in Nadi, before he joined Brothers Rugby Club in Votualevu. In 1992, he also played for Nadi Cavaliers. For the Fiji national team, he first played during a test match against Samoa, in Apia, on 1 June 1991. Rabaka also took part at the 1991 Rugby World Cup, where he played only in the match against Romania, at Brive-la-Gaillarde, where he scored two drop goals, the first being kicked from the halfway line and the second from the 10 metres line. His rugby career ended in 1993 at the age of 27, after he was involved in a hit and run accident.

== Death ==
On 24 June 2017, Rabaka died at the age of 51 after a long illness and was buried in Vuniyasi, Nadi. He is survived by his wife Ana, seven children and two grandchildren.
