= Kele Leawere =

Fiji international rugby union player

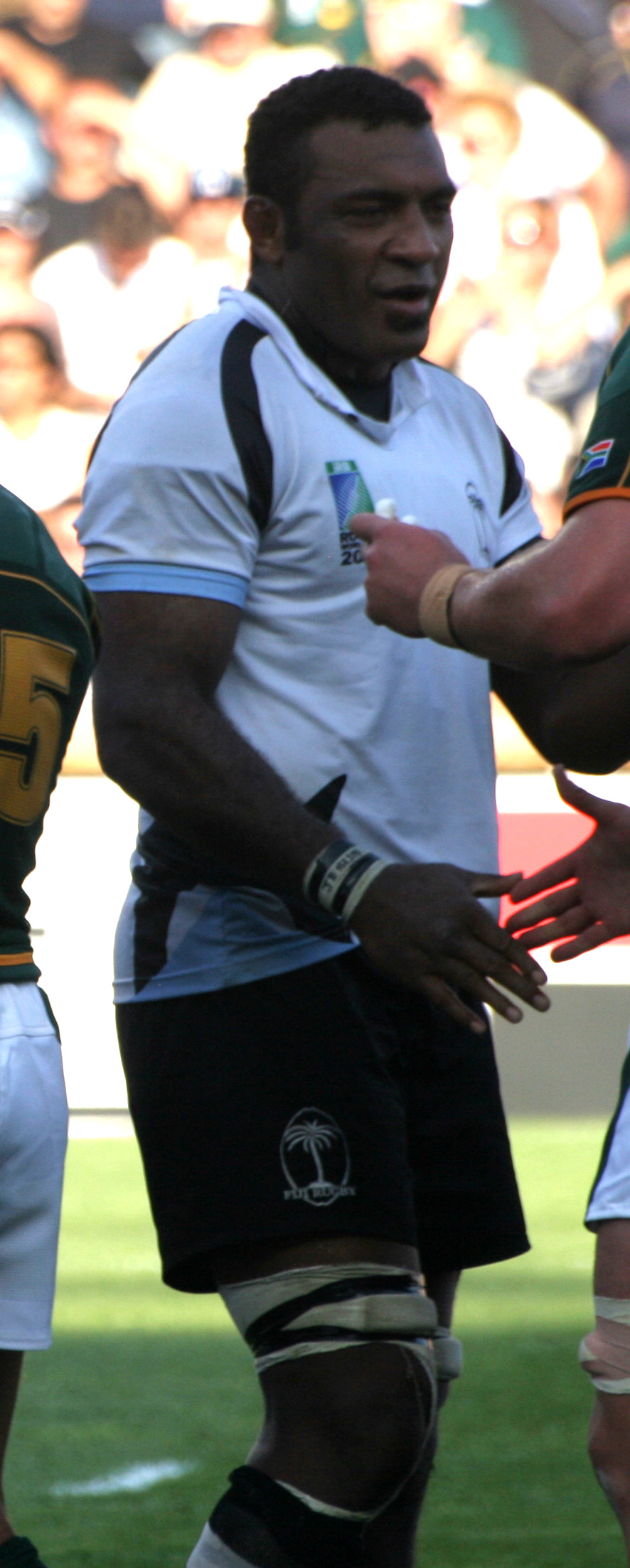
- South Africa vs Fiji during 2007 Rugby World Cup
- Born: Senikavika Kelemete Leawere; 27 April 1974 (age 52) Levuka, Fiji
- Height: 1.93 m (6 ft 4 in)
- Weight: 120 kg (18 st 13 lb; 265 lb)
- Notable relative(s): Sekove Leawere (brother); Isaia Walker-Leawere (son)

Rugby union career
- Position: Lock
Senior career
Years	Team	Apps	(Points)
1996 - 1997	East Coast		
1997 - 1997	Fiji Warriors		
- Poverty Bay
1998	East Coast		
- Nadroga
1999 - 2002	Stallions		
2005 -	Hino Motors		
International career
Years	Team	Apps	(Points)
2001 - 2003	NZ Divisional XV		
2002 - 2008	Fiji	25	(25)
2008	Pacific Islanders	2	(0)

Senikavika Kelemete Leawere (born 27 April 1974) is a Fijian rugby union player. He plays as a lock.

== Career ==
He is the elder brother of former Fiji sevens rep, Mika Leawere and Sekove Leawere. He departed for New Zealand in 1996 and has made an excellent name for himself in NPC Division Two with East Coast, making 56 appearances and playing for the NZ Divisional XV against Italy and Ireland. He also played for the Fiji Warriors against the ACT Brumbies in 1997. He played for Nadroga and also represented the Coastal Stallions in the Colonial Cup.

In October 2002, Leawere flew to Fiji to attend the national trials and won selection for the tour to Britain and Ireland, making his Test debut as a replacement against Scotland. He scored his first test try in June 2004 when he twisted and turned his way through the Samoan defense in Suva. He was a member of the Fiji team at the 2003 Rugby World Cup.

In May 2007, he was chosen to be part of Fiji team for the 2007 Pacific Nations Cup and later on co-captained the Fiji team at the 2007 Rugby World Cup. In the 2007 World Cup he scored one of the tries as Fiji defeated Wales to reach their first quarter final in 20 years.

In August 2014, he joined the National Federation Party to contest in the upcoming elections.
