= Sam Domoni =

Fijian rugby player (1968–2021)

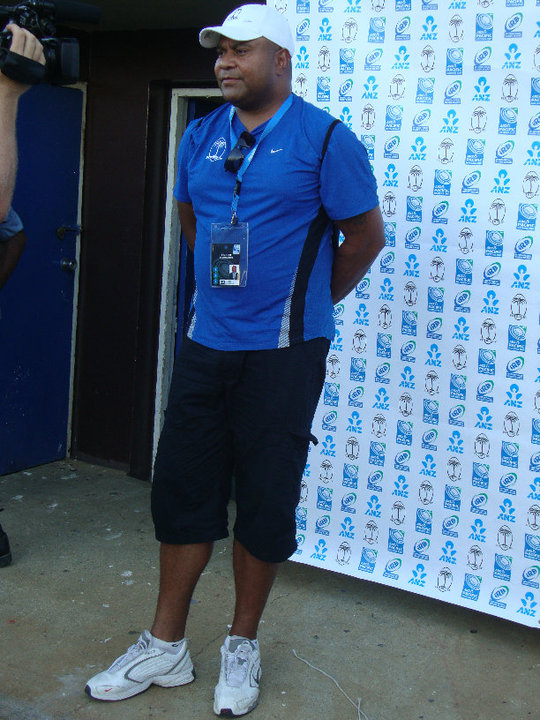
- Domoni at the 2010 IRB Pacific Nations Cup
- Born: 25 December 1968
- Died: 24 July 2021 (aged 52)
- Height: 6 ft 7 in (2.01 m)
- Weight: 105 kg (231 lb; 16 st 7 lb)

Rugby union career
- Position(s): Lock, Flanker
Amateur team(s)
Years	Team	Apps	(Points)
1985-1990	Waimani Rugby club		
1986	Rewa Colts		
1994-2002	North RFC		
Senior career
Years	Team	Apps	(Points)
1988-1990	Rewa		
1992	Saracens		
1992-1993	London Irish		
1994-1998	NSW Waratahs		
Provincial / State sides
Years	Team	Apps	(Points)
1988	Bay of Plenty (training squad)		
-	Bay of Plenty		
Super Rugby
Years	Team	Apps	(Points)
1996-1998	NSW Waratahs		
International career
Years	Team	Apps	(Points)
1990-1991	Fiji	6	
Coaching career
- Years: Team
- 2010-2011: Fiji

Samuela Ravanua Domoni Junior (25 December 1968 – 24 July 2021) was a Fijian former rugby union footballer and the former national coach of the Fiji national rugby union team.

He played as a lock or flanker. He was 6 ft 7 in (2.01 m) and during his playing days weighed 105 kg (231 lb).

He played Super Rugby for NSW Waratahs. He also played for English clubs, London Irish and Saracens.

He played for Fiji 6 times between 1990 and 1991 and was part of the Fiji team to the 1991 Rugby World Cup. He made his test debut for Fiji in December 1990, against Hong Kong.

After retiring from rugby, he coached the Combined Penrith and Zion Lions between 1999 and 2000. Between 2002–03, he coached The Entrance rugby club based in New South Wales. He was appointed the skills and assistant coach for the Manly Rugby club in 2004 before joining the Penrith 7's rugby club in 2005. He was appointed the Fiji head coach in 2010 after his predecessor, Ilivasi Tabua was fired.

After a dismal 2011 RWC, he was fired and replaced by assistant coach, Inoke Male as head coach.

Domoni died on 24 July 2021, at the age of 52, from Covid-19 during the COVID-19 pandemic in Fiji.

Sporting positions
Preceded by (Fiji) Ilivasi Tabua	Fiji National Rugby Union Coach; 2009–11	Succeeded by (Fiji) Inoke Male
