= Akuila Savu =

Fijian economist

Akuila Savu (1944–2014) was a Fijian economist and a native of Daliconi Village, Vanua Balavu in the Lau Province.

== Career ==
He served at the Central Planning Office as Director of Economic Planning before his stint as Chief Executive Officer and Managing Director of Air Pacific in 1980. In the 1990s, Savu was the Executive Chairman of the Ports Authority of Fiji. He later became a board member of the Yatu Lau Company, owned by the people of Lau Province.

=== Air Pacific ===
Within a year of becoming CEO, Savu reduced staff and services and formulated a recovery plan to reduce Air Pacific's expected $6 million loss to $4 million. This plan included the Fiji Government buying back shares owned by Pacific Island Countries to make the company wholly owned by Fiji. In an interview with The New York Times in October 1981, Savu said, "If you look at the shareholdings, the intention was that we would be a regional airline." But, with most Pacific islands forming their own national airlines he added that,"Our shareholders are competing against themselves." His five-year plan included the purchase of the airline's first $17 million Boeing 737-200 and replacement of inefficient aircraft due to underestimated competition from Australia and New Zealand and the special needs of operating aircraft in the Pacific. The commercial airline was not subsidized and instead they borrowed money, leading to problems Savu highlighted in the same interview,"You have to borrow, you end up with high interest and a short repayment period."

=== Ports Authority ===
In 1994, Akuila Savu launched an internal inquiry into the finances of the Ports Authority, but did not make its outcome public. He was criticized by the leader of the opposition, Mahendra Chaudhry, for this.

=== Mualevu Tikina Holdings Limited ===
Savu was one of the four men of Mualevu Tikina requested by Ratu Serufoama Colavanua, the Sau ni Vanua ko Mualevu and Tui Mavana, to form an investment company for the Tikina. The other three were Laisenia Qarase from Mavana Village, Filipe Bole from Mualevu Village and Solomone Vosaicake from Avea Village. In 1992, Mualevu Tikina Holdings was registered as a company. In 2018, Mualevu Tikina Holdings Limited and Vanuabalavu Holdings Limited merged to form Vanubalavu Vision Limited, with Qarase as Chairman. In April 2020, it was announced that the company had a paid up capital of $3.5 million and total assets of $10 million.

=== Yatu Lau Company ===
After retiring from Ports Authority and until his death, Akuila was Deputy Chairman and Company Secretary of the Yatu Lau Company, under the chairmanship of First Lady Adi Koila Nailatikau. In a 2014 interview with Fiji Sun, Savu announced the company had set up a committee to look into the possibility of a listing in the South Pacific Stock Exchange.
