= Acura Niuqila =

- Full name: Acura Sabaria Niuqila
- Born: 31 January 1961 (age 65) Wainibokasi, Fiji

Rugby union career
- Position: Fly half / Wing
International career
| Years | Team | Apps | (Points) |
| 1983–86 | Fiji | 15 | (24) |
| 1988–89 | Australia | 3 | (12) |

Acura Sabaria Niuqila (born 31 January 1961) is a Fijian-born former rugby union international who represented both Fiji and Australia during the 1980s.

Born in Wainibokasi, Niuqila was educated at Suva's Lami High School and played rugby for Nakelo. He gained 15 caps for Fiji between 1983 and 1986, mostly playing in the fly half position.

Niuqila, after joining Sydney club Randwick in 1986, earned a Wallabies call up for the 1988 tour of Europe. Used as a winger, he debuted against Scotland at Murrayfield, then in his second Test appearances scored a hat-trick of tries in a resounding win over Italy. He was capped by the Wallabies the final time in the 1st Test of the 1989 British Lions tour.

== See also ==
- List of Australia national rugby union players
- List of Fiji national rugby union players
