= Jope Tuikabe =

Fijian former rugby union footballer

- Born: November 27, 1966 (age 59) Fiji
- Height: 198 cm (6 ft 6 in)
- Weight: 95 kg (209 lb)
- Occupation: Soldier

Rugby union career
- Position: Flanker
Amateur team(s)
Years	Team	Apps	(Points)
- Army
International career
Years	Team	Apps	(Points)
1999-2001	Fiji	18	(60)
National sevens team
Years	Team		Comps
1996-?	Fiji		1997

Jope Tuikabe (born 27 November 1966) is a Fijian former rugby union and rugby sevens player. He played as a flanker.

He has played for Fiji sevens since 1996. One year later, he was called up for the 1997 Rugby World Cup Sevens, which the Fijians won. He was elected as a star of tournament's team. Following the tournament, Post Fiji issued a series of stamps commemorating the winning team, which also included Waisale Serevi, Taniela Qauqau, Leveni Duvuduvukula, Inoke Maraiwai, Aminiasi Naituyaga, Lemeki Koroi, Marika Vunibaka, Luke Erenavula and Manasa Bari. However, the Fijians did not manage to defend their title at the 2001 Rugby World Cup Sevens, as they were eliminated in the semi-finals of the main tournament after losing to Australia. Overall, Tuikabe scored nine tries in both of these tournaments. He appeared twice in the Commonwealth Games: in Kuala Lumpur 1998 and Manchester 2002, winning a silver medal in both tournaments after their final defeats against New Zealand. He, however won the rugby sevens tournament at the 2001 World Games. He also took part at the IRB Sevens World Series during the 1999/2000, 2000/2001 and 2001/2002 seasons. During three years of appearances in the rugby union squad, he played in 20 matches, including 17 official international matches, scoring 15 points - all tries. In 2001, thanks to his performances in both squads, he was awarded the Player of the Year Award. He was a soldier by profession and trained the Army rugby sevens team, and at international level he was in the coaching staff as assistant coach or head coach.
