= Savenaca Tamaibeka =

Fiji international rugby union player & civil servant

Roko Tui of Macuata
- In office 1939–1946

Personal details
- Died: 6 March 1959 Suva, Fiji

Rugby union career
- Position: Centre
International career
Years	Team	Apps	(Points)
1924–1928	Fiji	10	(3)

Ratu Savenaca Tamaibeka (died 6 March 1959) was a Fijian civil servant and rugby union international. He captained the Fiji national rugby union team on their second overseas tour in 1928.

== Biography ==
Tamaibeka started his rugby career in 1914, becoming one of the best players in the territory. Described in official documents as a brilliant rugby player, he was also noted to be the "first Fijian to use his powerful running ability to football advantage". He played in Fiji's first-ever international match on 18 August 1924 against Samoa in Apia, scoring Fiji's second try "with three opponents hanging on to him" as they won 6–0. He captained the team that went on the second overseas tour to Tonga in 1928. He played his tenth and final match for Fiji against Samoa on 21 September 1928.

Outside of rugby, Tamaibeka joined the Posts and Telegraphs department in 1916. He later moved to the Medical Department, where he worked until being appointed Roko Tui of Macuata Province in 1939, a role he held until going on leave prior to retirement in 1946. He lost a leg in 1941.

He died in Suva in March 1959.
