= Manasa Bari =

Fijian former rugby union footballer

- Born: Manasa D. Bari; 27 May 1976 (age 50) Tavua, Fiji
- Height: 6 ft 0 in (1.83 m)
- Weight: 198 lb (14 st 2 lb; 90 kg)
- Occupation: Police sergeant

Rugby union career
- Position: Wing
Amateur team(s)
| Years | Team | Apps | (Points) |
| 1997 | Alhambra-Union | | |
| 2004 | Waitete | | |
Provincial / State sides
| Years | Team | Apps | (Points) |
| 1997 | Otago | 11 | (55) |
| 2004 | King Country | 2 | (0) |
Super Rugby
| Years | Team | Apps | (Points) |
| 1997 | Highlanders | 6 | (20) |
International career
| Years | Team | Apps | (Points) |
| 1995-1999 | Fiji | 18 | (60) |
National sevens team
| Years | Team | | Comps |
| 1994-1997 | Fiji | | 1997 |

Manasa Bari (born 27 May 1974) is a Fijian former rugby union footballer and currently, coach. He played as wing.

== Career ==
Bari was first capped Fiji during the test match against Samoa on 1 July 1995, in Apia. He played thirty matches for Fiji, including eight test matches, one of them being the 1999 Rugby World Cup match against France in Toulouse, on 16 October, being his last international cap.

Bari debuted playing for Fiji sevens in the 1994 Hong Kong Sevens. Two years later, he was called up for the 1997 Rugby World Cup Sevens, in which the Fijians proved unbeaten by winning the Melrose Cup for the first time. After the tournament, Post Fiji issued a series of stamps commemorating the winning team, which also featured Waisale Serevi, Taniela Qauqau, Jope Tuikabe, Leveni Duvuduvukula, Inoke Maraiwai, Aminiasi Naituyaga, Marika Vunibaka, Luke Erenavula and Lemeki Koroi. Eh also took part to the second stage of the Fijian campaign in the 1999-00 IRB Sevens World Series.

Bari worked as a police sergeant. He coached the Police sevens team and other local teams, at International level he is part of the training staff as assistant coach or as manager.
