= Langi Peters =

- Full name: Langi Daniel Peters
- Born: 3 April 1979 (age 47) Suva, Fiji
- Height: 6 ft 7 in (201 cm)
- Weight: 257 lb (117 kg)

Rugby union career
- Position: Lock
Provincial / State sides
Years	Team	Apps	(Points)
2006	Wairarapa Bush	11	(0)
International career
Years	Team	Apps	(Points)
2005–07	Fiji	5	(0)

Langi Daniel Peters (born 3 April 1979) is a Fijian former rugby union international.

== Biography ==
Peters, one of twins, is a native of Nausori.

=== Rugby career ===
A 6 ft 6 in lock, Peters played a season of New Zealand provincial rugby with Wairarapa Bush in 2006 and was a member of their Meads Cup-winning side. After first playing in France in 2008, Peters competed for various clubs in the country's lower divisions on a contract basis and at the age of 44 won a Fédérale 1 title with Stade Langonnais in 2023.

Peters made five capped appearances for Fiji between 2005 and 2007, debuting off the bench against Samoa in Apia. He was ruled out of contention for the 2007 Rugby World Cup when he ruptured his anterior cruciate ligament.

== See also ==
- List of Fiji national rugby union players
