= Samisoni Rabaka =

Fijian rugby union player (born 1969)

- Born: Samisoni Rabaka Nasigavesi; 19 April 1969 Nadi, Fiji
- Height: 6 ft 0 in (1.83 m)
- Weight: 198 lb (90 kg)
- School: Nadi College
- Notable relative: Tomasi Rabaka (brother)

Rugby union career
- Position: Scrum-half
Senior career
Years	Team	Apps	(Points)
1984-1985	St.Mary's		
1985-1989	Dratabu		
1989-2002	Airport Rugby Club		
Provincial / State sides
Years	Team	Apps	(Points)
1984-2002	Nadi		
2002	Mosi		
2003-2005	Tailevu		
International career
Years	Team	Apps	(Points)
1992-2003	Fiji	29	(14)

Samisoni Rabaka Nasigavesi (born 19 April 1969, in Nadi) is a Fijian former rugby union player who played as a scrum-half. His brother is the late Tomasi Rabaka, who was also a Fijian international.

== Career ==
Grown up in the Votualevu village, in Nadi. He started his rugby career playing for the St.Mary's Rugby Club, before joining Dratabu Rugby Club and then, Airport Rugby Club. Rabaka played for the Nadi provincial team, which he captained. He first played for the Fiji national team during a test match against Samoa, in Suva, on 20 June 1992. He narrowly missed a place in the 1999 Rugby World Cup Fiji squad, however he traveled with the team as an emergency replacement for Jacob Rauluni. Rabaka was part of the Fiji roster for the 2003 Rugby World Cup, where he played the pool stage matches against France in Brisbane on 11 October and against Japan in Townsville, on 23 October, the latter being his last test cap for Fiji. In his career, he scored 29 points and 3 tries in aggregate. He also represented Fiji at sevens level.
