= Luke Dawai =

- Died: 20 June 1970 (aged 53) Nadi, Fiji

Rugby union career
- Position: Flanker
International career
Years	Team	Apps	(Points)
1947	Fiji	2	(0)

Ratu Luke Dawai (died 20 June 1970) was a Fijian chief, administrator and rugby union international.

== Biography ==
A member of the Great Council of Chiefs, Dawai worked for the Nadi local government administration, serving as Buli Nadi for seventeen years and Tui Nadi for ten. He held several other official posts, including sitting on the Ba Provincial Council, Nadi Local Rural Authority, Nadi Township Board and the Native Land Trust Board.

He served in the 4th Battalion of the Fiji Infantry Regiment during World War II. After the war he played for the Fiji national rugby union team, making two appearances as a flanker against Tonga in 1947.

Dawai died in June 1970 at the age of 53.
