= Waisiki Masirewa =

- Full name: Waisiki Masirewa Loco
- Born: 4 March 1966 (age 60) Raralevu, Tailevu, Fiji
- Height: 6 ft 3 in (191 cm)
- Weight: 216 lb (98 kg)
- Notable relative: Semisi Masirewa (nephew)

Rugby union career
- Position: Flanker
Provincial / State sides
| Years | Team | Apps | (Points) |
| 1993–98 | Counties Manukau | 13 | (10) |
International career
| Years | Team | Apps | (Points) |
| 1995–99 | Fiji | 5 | (5) |

Waisiki Masirewa Loco (born 4 March 1966) is a Fijian former rugby union international.

Masirewa comes from the village of Raralevu in Tailevu Province.

A flanker, Masirewa represented Fiji in the late 1990s and was capped five times. He played provincial rugby with Counties Manukau and settled in Waikato, representing New Zealand in rugby sevens.

Masirewa is an ordained minister.

== See also ==
- List of Fiji national rugby union players
