= Inoke Male =

Fiji international rugby union player

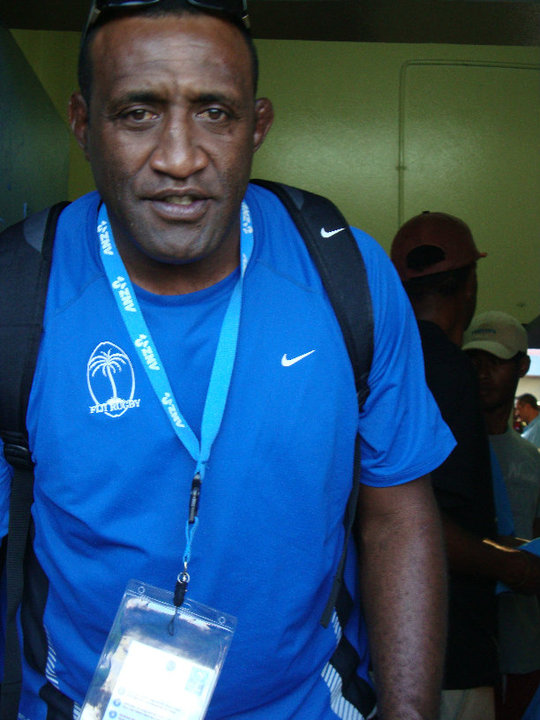
- Born: Inoke Male; 3 June 1963 (age 63) Nausori, Fiji
- Height: 1.91 m (6 ft 3 in)
- Weight: 103 kg (16 st 3 lb)
- Notable relative: Waisiki Masirewa (Brother)

Rugby union career
- Position: Number eight
Senior career
Years	Team	Apps	(Points)
1985–1989	Raralevu		
1989–1993	Navy		
1995–1997	Te Kawhata		
1997–2000	Navy		
2000–2002	Tailevu		
International career
Years	Team	Apps	(Points)
1993–2001	Fiji	15	(5)
Coaching career
- Years: Team
- 2003–2006: Navy
- 2007–2009: Tailevu
- 2009–2010: Fiji (Asst. Coach)
- 2010: Fiji Warriors
- 2010–2012: Vatukoula Rugby
- 2011: Fiji U20
- 2012–2014: Fiji (Head Coach)
- 2015–: Tailevu

Inoke Male (born 3 June 1963, in Nausori, Fiji), is a Fijian former rugby union footballer and former head coach of the Fijian national side. He played in the position of Number eight, but could also play Flanker during his playing career.

== Fiji Caps ==
Male, a product of Raralevu rugby club, first represented Fiji in 1993 in a series of uncapped matches. However, a member of the Navy in Fiji, he was unable to represent his nation further after he moved to the Middle East for peacekeeping duties. On his return in 1995, he signed with Te Kawhata in New Zealand where he stayed for two years. He returned to the Fiji international scene in 1998, and Male earned his first official test cap for Fiji on 18 September 1998 against Australia in Sydney, where he started in the Number eight jersey. After missing out on the Epson Cup in 1999, he forced his way into the 1999 Rugby World Cup squad with a competent performance for the Fiji Warriors against the NZ Maori. He last played for Fiji on 8 July 2001 against neighboring Pacific island team Samoa. He played 22 times for Fiji (only 15 test matches), scoring only 5 points with his try against Samoa in 2001.

Cap #	Date	Opponents	Score	Result	Venue
–	9 August 1998	(New Zealand) Northland	44–30	Lost	Lowe Walker Stadium, Whangārei
1	18 September 1998	Australia	66–20	Lost	Parramatta Stadium, Sydney
–	8 November 1998	(England) Penzance & Newlyn	5–53	Won	Mennaye Field, Cornwall
–	19 November 1998	(England) Bristol Select XV	28–58	Won	Memorial Stadium, Bristol
–	24 November 1998	(Scotland) Glasgow Caledonians	41–22	Lost	Scotstoun Stadium, Glasgow
–	27 November 1998	(Scotland) Edinburgh Reivers	27–30	Won	Mansfield Park, Hawick
–	30 November 1998	(England) Leeds Tykes	27–10	Lost	Headingley, Leeds
–	17 August 1999	(Australia) Australian Barbarians	31–25	Lost	North Sydney Oval, Sydney
2	26 August 1999	Uruguay	39–24	Won	Stadio Tommaso Fattori, L'Aquila (NV)
3	20 October 1999	England	45–24	Lost	Twickenham Stadium, London
4	20 May 2000	Japan	22–47	Won	Chichibunomiya Rugby Stadium, Tokyo
5	26 May 2000	Tonga	22–25	Won	Teufaiva Stadium, Nukuʻalofa
6	3 June 2000	Samoa	31–17	Lost	Apia Park, Apia
7	30 June 2000	United States	37–21	Won	Apia Park, Apia (NV)
8	7 July 2000	Canada	11–42	Won	Apia Park, Apia (NV)
9	15 July 2000	Italy	43–9	Won	Churchill Park, Lautoka
10	25 May 2001	Tonga	31–26	Lost	Teufaiva Stadium, Nukuʻalofa
11	9 June 2001	Samoa	27–36	Lost	National Stadium, Suva
12	16 June 2001	Tonga	25–20	Won	Churchill Park, Lautoka
13	23 June 2001	Samoa	19–22	Won	Apia Park, Apia
14	3 July 2001	Canada	23–52	Won	Chichibunomiya Rugby Stadium, Tokyo (NV)
15	8 July 2001	Samoa	28–17	Won	Chichibunomiya Rugby Stadium, Tokyo (NV)

== Coach of Fiji ==
Having coached in Fiji since 2004, Male applied for the Fijian head coach when it became vacant in 2011. He had previously acted as Assistant Coach to Sam Domoni between 2009 and 2010, before taking hold of the Fiji Warriors in 2010 and the Under 20's in 2011. On 13 January 2012, following a disappointing fourth place in Pool D in the 2011 Rugby World Cup with Sam Domoni in charge (including a record loss to Wales 66–0 and an unconvincing 49–25 win over Namibia), Inoke Male was named the new head coach of the Flying Fijians.

Male's first match in charge was against Japan in the 2012 IRB Pacific Nations Cup, which saw Fiji win 25–19. They narrowly lost to Samoa in the second round 29–26, but finished second in the overall table following a 29–17 win over Tonga. Male also coached Fiji against Tier 1 nation Scotland during the 2012 mid-year rugby union tests, but Scotland were the victors 37–25 in Lautoka. Inoke and his team had a disappointing end-of-year tour in 2012, losing 54–12 to England in London and losing 53–0 to Ireland XV in Munster. They earned a close 24–19 win over Georgia, but the team also lost to English domestic club side Gloucester 31–29.

2013 saw Fiji win their first ever IRB Pacific Nations Cup winning 4 from 5 in the tournament; 22–8 win over Japan, 35–10 win over the United States and a 34–21 win over Tonga. Fiji's only loss was to Canada 20–18. In addition to the Pacific Nations Cup, Inoke led Fiji to a 33–14 win over the Classic All Blacks as part of Fiji's centennial celebrations. The 2013 end-of-year tour saw Fiji win 2 from 4 on tour; 36–13 win over Portugal in Lisbon and a 26–7 win over Romania in Bucharest. Fiji lost to a star-studded Barbarians side 43–19 and to a weakened Italian side 37–31. This match however, saw Fiji break the record for the number of yellow cards given out to one team in a single test match at 5.

In January 2014 the International Rugby Board, (IRB), suspended funding to the Fiji Rugby Union after a failure to address concerns over administration and governance with immediate effect. With the lack of money that the FRU has, the cash-strapped union sacked Inoke Male on 27 January 2014, 1 year early of his contract. This meant his win rate with Fiji was 50%, coached 16 won 8 lost 8.

Sporting positions
Preceded by (Fiji) Sam Domoni	Fiji National Rugby Union Coach; 2012–2014	Succeeded by (New Zealand) John McKee
