= Jeremaiya Tamanisau =

Fijian rugby union footballer (born 1982)

Jeremaiya Tuilevu Tamanisau (born 11 September 1982 in Sigatoka) is a Fijian rugby union footballer. He plays as a wing for the Rugby Club Toulonnais.

In 2005, Tamanisau played for his local club, Belovula and in 2006 to 2007 played for Nadroga in the Digicel Cup. He was selected into the Fiji Barbarians team for the Pacific Rugby Cup after he impressed the selectors while playing for the Coastal Stallions in the Colonial Cup and in 2007 was selected for the Fiji Warriors team. He was part of the 2006 and 2007 Stallions Colonial cup winning team. He was selected by the Rugby Club Toulonnais soon after for the 2007-08 Rugby Pro D2 season, where he played 13 matches for them scoring 4 tries. In 2009 Tamanisau signed a one-year contract with the Bordeaux Bègles.

== Personal life ==
Tamanisau is 6 feet 1 inch (1.85 m) tall and weighs 95 kg. He is the younger brother of former Fiji International and Highlanders winger and current Nadroga coach, Aisea Tuilevu.
