= Aminiasi Naituyaga =

- Born: 23 June 1973
- Died: 3 June 2002 (aged 28) Sigatoka River, Fiji
- Height: 6 ft 4 in (193 cm)
- Weight: 216 lb (98 kg)
- School: Sigatoka Mission School

Rugby union career
- Position: Flanker / No. 8
International career
Years	Team	Apps	(Points)
1997	Fiji	4	(0)

Aminiasi Naituyaga (23 June 1973 – 6 March 2002) was a Fijian rugby union international.

== Rugby union ==
A hard-tackling flanker from Nayawa village, Naituyaga was known by the nickname "Steelman". He played on the Fiji side that won the 1997 Rugby World Cup Sevens and was capped four times that year for the Fiji XV, debuting against the All Blacks in North Shore City. His son, also named Aminiasi, was a Fiji under-20s representative.

== Death ==
Naituyaga died of drowning in 2002 while attempting to cross the Sigatoka River after a training session.

== See also ==
- List of Fiji national rugby union players
