= 2005 Rugby World Cup Sevens squads =

Here is an overview of the teams which took part at the 2005 Rugby World Cup Sevens.

== Pool A ==
=== New Zealand ===
Coach: (New Zealand) Gordon Tietjens

1. Edwin Cocker
2. George Naoupu
3. Tanerau Latimer
4. Josh Blackie
5. Amasio Valence
6. Liam Messam (c)
7. Tamati Ellison
8. Tafai Ioasa
9. Rudi Wulf
10. Orene Ai'i
11. Isaia Toeava
12. Lifeimi Mafi

=== Scotland ===
Coach: Rob Moffat

1. Mark Lee
2. David Gray (c)
3. Alasdair Strokosch
4. Kelly Brown
5. Ollie Brown
6. Kenny Sinclair
7. Andrew Turnbull
8. Colin Gregor
9. Jamie Blackwood
10. Roland Reid
11. Clark Laidlaw
12. Calum MacRae

=== United States ===
1. Todd Clever
2. Alex Magleby
3. Kevin Whitcher
4. Mose Timoteo
5. David Fee (c)
6. Phillip Eloff
7. Riaan van Zyl
8. Riaan Hamilton
9. Justin Stencel
10. Mike Palefau
11. Jason Raven
12. Jone Naqica

=== Ireland ===
1. Mark Bruce
2. Kevin Croke
3. David Hewitt
4. Tomás O'Leary
5. Ian Humphreys
6. Andrew Maxwell
7. Michael McComish
8. Martin McPhail
9. James Norton
10. Brendon O'Connor
11. Niall Roman
12. Brian Tuohy

=== South Korea ===
1. Park Kwang-soo
2. Yoo Min-suk
3. Lee Kwang-moon
4. You Young-nam
5. Chae Jae-young
6. Chun Jong-man
7. Kwak Chul-woong
8. Kim Keun-hyun
9. Yang Young-hun
10. Yong Hwan-myung
11. Kim Hyung-ki
12. Park Chang-min

=== Tonga ===
1. Manako Tonga
2. Joseph Kolokihakaufisi
3. Tevita Fifita
4. Teuʻimuli Kaufusi
5. Sitaleki Mafileʻo
6. Ofa Misa
7. Sikuti Vunipola
8. Siale Lolohea
9. Tevita Tuʻifua
10. Andrew Maʻilei
11. Sione Langatau
12. Kiniconi Bakewa

== Pool B ==
=== England ===
Coach: Mike Friday

1. Geoff Appleford
2. Tony Roques
3. Pat Sanderson
4. Peter Richards
5. Henry Paul
6. Neil Starling
7. Ugo Monye
8. Phil Dowson
9. Rob Thirlby
10. Ben Gollings
11. Simon Amor (c)
12. Richard Haughton

=== France ===
1. Vincent Forgues
2. Martial Molinier
3. Julien Carraud
4. Brice Salobert
5. Patrick Bosque
6. Renaud Dulin
7. Yohan Dalla Riva
8. Laurent Ferrères
9. Rida Jahouer
10. Jérôme Naves
11. Cédric Desbrosse
12. Julien Malzieu

=== Georgia ===
1. Giorgi Kacharava
2. Vasil Katsadze
3. Irakli Gundishvili
4. Lasha Pirpilashvili
5. Badri Khekhelashvili
6. Tedore Zibzibadze
7. Grigol Labadze
8. Lekso Gugava
9. Irakli Abuseridze
10. Elguja Iovadze
11. Archil Kartarashvili
12. Irakli Machkhaneli

=== Samoa ===
Coach: (Samoa) John Schuster

1. Lome Fa'atau
2. Sailosi Tagicakibau
3. Paul Perez
4. Junior Leota
5. Kiri Mariner
6. Gaolo Elisara
7. Apoua Stewart
8. Brian Lima
9. Uale Mai
10. Samu Eteuati
11. Mark Tanuvasa
12. David Lemi

=== Chinese Taipei ===
1. Hsieh Cheng-Chung
2. Wu Chih-Wei
3. Huang Han-Yang
4. Pan Chih-Ming
5. Chang Weh-Cheng
6. Wang Kuo-Feng
7. Tung Yuan-Hsiang
8. Sun Cheng-Yen
9. Chen Chi-Chung
10. Wu Chih-Whsien
11. Chen Chih-Fei
12. Chang Chun-Ming

=== Italy ===
1. Steven Bortolussi
2. Javier Dragotto
3. Nicola Leonardi
4. Alvaro López González
5. Pablo Canavosio
6. Jacob Gaina
7. Emiliano Mulieri
8. Tomás Pucciariello
9. Benjamin de Jager
10. Ezio Galon
11. Antonio Mannato
12. Luca Martin (c)

== Pool C ==
=== Fiji ===
Coach: Fiji Wayne Pivac

1. Semisi Naevo
2. Apolosi Satala
3. Viliame Satala
4. Ifereimi Rawaqa
5. Jone Daunivucu
6. Waisale Serevi (c)
7. Vilimoni Delasau
8. Marika Vunibaka
9. Nasoni Roko
10. William Ryder
11. Sireli Bobo
12. Neumi Nanuku

=== Australia ===
Coach: Glen Ella

1. Luke Inman
2. Matt Hodgson
3. Keiran Massey
4. Tim Clark (c)
5. James Morgan
6. Andrew Brown
7. Nick Reily
8. Josh Gamgee
9. James Su'a
10. Anthony Sauer
11. Shawn Mackay
12. Kacey Mitchell

=== Japan ===
Coach: Kazuhiko Honjo

1. Tomohiro Yamaguchi
2. Kilive Naloli
3. Katoni Otukolo
4. Takashi Kikutani
5. Eiji Yamamoto
6. Kiyonori Tanaka
7. Nathan Ashley
8. Yusuke Kobuki
9. Ryohei Miki
10. Go Aruga
11. Hirotoki Onozawa
12. Yohei Shinomiya

=== Portugal ===
Coach: (Argentina) Daniel Hourcade

1. Vasco Uva
2. Diogo Mateus
3. Martim Tomé
4. Antonio Pinto
5. Filipe Grenho
6. Miguel Morais
7. Pedro Carvalho
8. Diogo Coutinho
9. Frederico Sousa
10. Pedro Leal
11. Antonio de Aguilar
12. Nuno Carvalho

=== Canada ===
Coach: Ric Suggitt

1. Marco Di Girolamo (c)
2. Ed Fairhurst
3. Christoph Strubin
4. Ryan Smith
5. Quentin Fyffe
6. Matt King
7. Derek Daypuck
8. Stirling Richmond
9. Brodie Henderson
10. Mike Danskin
11. Dave Moonlight
12. Justin Mensah-Coker

=== Hong Kong ===
Coach: Ian Torpey

1. Paul Dingley
2. Paul Gaffney
3. Kris Marin
4. Warren Warner
5. Andrew Wong Kee
6. Andrew Chambers
7. Rowan Varty
8. Nigel D'Acre
9. Robert Naylor
10. Ricky Cheuk
11. Paul Morehu
12. Alexander Gibbs

Injured: Tim O'Connor

== Pool D ==
=== South Africa ===
Coach: Paul Treu

1. Tobela Mdaka
2. Stefen Basson
3. Jano Vermaak
4. Lesley Jackson
5. Schalk van der Merwe
6. Danwell Demas
7. Gareth Krause
8. Eddie Fredericks
9. Mzwandile Stick
10. Fabian Juries
11. Marius Schoeman
12. Jaco Pretorius

=== Argentina ===
- Head Coach: Hernán Rouco Oliva
1. Juan Martín Berberián (San Isidro Club)
2. Francisco Bosch (Hindu Club)
3. Lucas Borges (Pucará)
4. Juan Martín Fernández Lobbe (Liceo Naval)
5. Santiago Gómez Cora (Lomas Athletic)
6. Francisco Leonelli (La Tablada) (C)
7. Fernando Higgs (Los Tordos)
8. Lucio López Fleming (San Isidro Club)
9. Federico Martín Aramburú (Biarritz)
10. Andrés Romagnoli (San Fernando)
11. Martín Schusterman (Plymouth Albion)
12. Federico Serra Miras (San Isidro Club)

=== Tunisia ===
1. Khaled Zegdene
2. Mohamed Yousri Souguir
3. Slah Blagui
4. Mohamed Ali Naouali
5. Sabeur Ben Charrada
6. Kais Issa
7. Lofti Ben Msallem
8. Abess Kherfani
9. Majdi Guirrat
10. Sabri Guemir
11. Amor Mezgar
12. Haithem Chelly

=== Russia ===
1. Vladislav Korshunov
2. Alexey Panasenko
3. Sergey Trishin
4. Igor Klyuchnikov
5. Vladimir Simonov
6. Pavel Novikov
7. Andrei Kuzin
8. Alexander Yanyuskin
9. Viktor Motorin
10. Yuri Kushnarev
11. Sergey Kuzmenko
12. Andrei Chaliouta

=== Kenya ===
1. Felix Clement Ochieng
2. Peter Claver Abuoga
3. Edwin Shimenga
4. Victor Sudi Simiyu
5. Leslie Mango
6. Allan Makaka
7. Oscar Osir Osula (C)
8. Benjamin Ayimba
9. Sidney Ashioya
10. Lucas Onyango
11. Newton Ongalo
12. Peter Ocholla

=== Uruguay ===
1. Marcelo Gutiérrez
2. Ignacio Conti
3. Nicolas Brignoni
4. Alfredo Delgado
5. Santiago Alfaro
6. Juan Beyhaut
7. Agustín Pérez del Castillo
8. Juan Baldomir
9. Matías Arocena
10. Agustín Pereira
11. Joaquín Pastore
12. Juan Campomar
