= List of Fijian sportspeople =

Lists of Fijians

Main list

Politicians

List of Fijian politicians
Heads of state
Viti premiers
Presidents - Vice-presidents
Governors - Governors-general
Prime ministers - Cabinet ministers
Attorneys-general - Foreign ministers
iTaukei (Fijian) affairs ministers - GCC chairmen
Opposition leaders
House speakers - Senate presidents
Parliamentarians - Senators

Other community leaders:
List of Fijian sportspeople

This list comprises sportspeople originally from Fiji, as well as some expatriates who play for or coach Fijian teams. The term Fijian is used here in a national, rather than ethnic, sense. Noa Nadruku was the first Fijian to play rugby league in the NRL. He played in the 1980s and 1990s for Canberra Raiders and the North Queensland Cowboys after switching from rugby union.

== Australian rules footballers ==
- Alipate Carlile (born 30 April 1987)
- David Rodan (born 8 October 1983)
- Nic Naitanui (born 4 May 1990)

== Cricketers ==
- William Apted (born 1930)
- I. L. Bula (1921–2005).

== Football ==
- Krishna, Roy.
- Masi, Esala.
- Hughes, Setareki.
- Wara, Scott.
- Laqeretabua, Joshua.
- Ravai, Peter.
- Mariappa, Adrian.
- Hall, Dan.

== Golfers ==
- Chand, Dinesh.
- Singh, Vijay (born 22 February 1963).

== Rugby League players ==
- Bukuya, Jason.
- Civoniceva, Petero.
- Groom, Aaron.
- Hayne, Jarryd.
- Koroibete, Marika.
- Koroisau, Apisai.
- Nabuli, Eto.
- Noa Nadruku
- Naiqama, Wes.
- Naiqama, Kevin.
- Naulu, Samueli.
- Radradra, Semi.
- Sims, Ashton.
- Sims, Tariq.
- Sims, Korbin.
- Tagive, Peni
- Tadulala, Semi.
- Uate, Akuila.
- Waqa, Sisa.

== NFL players ==
- Singh, Bobby (born November 21, 1975).
- Keiaho, Freddy (born December 18, 1982).
- Luvu, Frankie (born September 19, 1996).

== Rugby union players ==
- Bobo, Sireli (born 1976).
- Bolavucu, Filimoni (born 1981).
- Ram, Jack (born 1987).
- Caucaunibuca, Rupeni (born 1980).
- Daunivucu, Jone (born 1977).
- Delasau, Vilimoni (born 12 July 1977).
- Doviverata, Ro Alifereti (born 14 June 1976)
- Kunatani, Semi (born 1990), player for the Tel Aviv Heat
- Kunavore, Maleli (born 13 November 1983).
- Ligairi, Norman
- Little, Nicky
- Lotawa, Watisone (born 13 July 1979)
- Luveitasau, Mosese (born 23 March 1980).
- Nabuliwaqa, Lepani (born 4 June 1980).
- Nacewa, Isa
- Naevo, Apenisa (born 24 February 1973).
- Naevo, Semisi (born 3 May 1976).
- Nanuku, Neumi
- Naqelevuki, Sireli
- Pivac, Wayne, coach
- Qera, Akapusi (born 1984).
- Rabeni, Seru
- Radaveta, Kiniviliame (born 17 March 1975).
- Rauluni, Moses
- Rawaqa, Ifereimi (born 20 September 1980).
- Roko, Nasoni (born 29 November 1979).
- Ryder, William (born 1982).
- Satala, Viliame (born 19 July 1972).
- Serevi, Waisale (born 20 May 1968).
- Simpson, Nigel (born 25 April 1975).
- Sivivatu, Sitiveni (born 19 April 1982).
- Tabua, Ilivasi, coach.
- Tadulala, Semi
- Tuqiri, Lote, (born 23 September 1979).
- Valetini, Rob (born 1998)
- Veremalua, Jasa (born 1988), player for the Tel Aviv Heat
- Vidiri, Joeli, (born 1973)
- Volavola, Mosese
- Vunibaka, Marika (born 1974)
- Waqaseduadua, Viliame (born 1982)

== Swimmers ==
- Rachel Ah Koy (b. May 31, 1989)
- Carl Probert
- Caroline Pickering Puamau
- Taichi Vakasama

== Boxers ==
- Sailosi Vatubua - Represented Fiji in amateur boxing and won the gold medal at the 1966 South Pacific Games.
- Renold Quinlan

== Wrestlers ==
- Snuka, Jimmy (born 18 May 1943).
- Snuka, Jimmy Jr.
- Snuka, Tamina.

== Windsurfers ==
- Tony Philp

== Miscellaneous sportspeople ==
- Boyer, Derek, Fiji-born Australian strongman.
- Davu, Vilimaina, Fiji-born New Zealand netball and basketball player.
- Delai, Jone, track and field athlete
- Elder, Rob, archer.
- Evans, Ivor, former Vancouver 86ers footballer.
- Lal, John Icha, footballer.
- Maharaj, J.D. (died 2006), sports administrator.
- Maraia Lum On, three times World Bowls silver medallist
- Rainibogi Taniela, 2022 Commonwealth Games weightlifting bronze medalist.
