= 2002 Fiji rugby union tour of British Isles =

Summary
P	W	D	L
Total
4	0	0	4
Test match
3	0	0	3
Opponent
P	W	D	L
Wales
1	0	0	1
Ireland
1	0	0	1
Scotland
1	0	0	1

The 2002 Fiji rugby union tour of Europe was a series of matches played in November 2002 in Wales, Ireland and Scotland by Fiji national rugby union team.

== Results ==
=== Wales ===
9 November 2002

Wales	58–14	Fiji
Try: Charvis; M. Jones (2); Parker; G. Thomas; G. Williams; Penalty try Con: Harris; S. Jones (3); Pen: S. Jones (5)		Try: Lasagavibau, Serevi; Con: Little; Serevi

Millennium Stadium, Cardiff
Attendance: 34,000
Referee: Stuart Dickinson (Australia)

Wales: 15. Rhys Williams, 14. Mark Jones, 13. Tom Shanklin, 12. Sonny Parker, 11. Gareth Thomas, 10. Stephen Jones, 9. Dwayne Peel, 8. Colin Charvis (capt.), 7. Martyn Williams, 6. Dafydd Jones, 5. Gareth Llewellyn, 4. Robert Sidoli, 3. Ben Evans, 2. Mefin Davies, 1. Iestyn Thomas – Replacements: 17. Martyn Madden, 18. Steve Williams, 19. Richard Parks, 21. Iestyn Harris, 22. Jamie Robinson – Unused: 16. Andrew Lewis, 20. Ryan Powell
Fiji: 15. Joseph Narruhn, 14. Fero Lasagavibau, 13. Seru Rabeni, 12. Seremaia Baikeinuku (yellow card) , 11. Norman Ligairi, 10. Nicky Little, 9. Jacob Rauluni, 8. Alfie Mocelutu, 7. Alifereti Doviverata, 6. Seta Tawake, 5. Simon Raiwalui, 4. Apenisa Naevo, 3. Bill Cavubati, 2. Greg Smith (capt.), 1. Richard Nyholt – Replacements: 19. Sisa Koyamaibole, 20. Samisoni Rabaka, 21. Epeli Ruivadra, 22. Waisale Serevi – Unused: 16. Bill Gadolo, 17. Paula Biutanaseva, 18. Isaia Rasila

=== Ireland ===
17 November 2002

Ireland	64–17	Fiji
Try: Bishop; Dawson; Foley; Maggs (3); Murphy (2); O'Driscoll; Con: Humphreys (5); Pen: Humphreys (3)		Try: Doviverata, Narruhn; Con: Little; Serevi; Pen: Little

Lansdowne Road, Dublin
Referee: Nigel Whitehouse (Wales)

Ireland: 15. Geordan Murphy, 14. Shane Horgan, 13. Brian O'Driscoll (capt.), 12. Kevin Maggs, 11. Justin Bishop, 10. David Humphreys, 9. Guy Easterby, 8. Anthony Foley, 7. Kieron Dawson, 6. Alan Quinlan, 5. Malcolm O'Kelly, 4. Leo Cullen, 3. John Hayes, 2. Frank Sheahan, 1. Marcus Horan – Replacements: 17. Reggie Corrigan, 18. Mick O'Driscoll, 19. Eric Miller, 22. Gordon D'Arcy – Unused: 16. Shane Byrne, 20. Peter Stringer, 21. Ronan O'Gara
Fiji: 15. Waisale Serevi, 14. Fero Lasagavibau, 13. Viliame Satala, 12. Seremaia Baikeinuku, 11. Norman Ligairi, 10. Nicky Little, 9. Jacob Rauluni, 8. Sisa Koyamaibole, 7. Alifereti Doviverata, 6. Alfie Mocelutu, 5. Simon Raiwalui, 4. Apenisa Naevo, 3. Bill Cavubati, 2. Greg Smith (capt.), 1. Richard Nyholt – Replacements: 18. Ifereimi Rawaqa, 19. Seta Tawake Naivaluwaqa, 20. Samisoni Rabaka, 21. Joseph Narruhn – Unused: 16. Paula Biutanaseva, 17. Isaia Rasila, 22. Isaac Mow

=== Scotland "A" ===
21 November 2002

Scotland A	45–29	Fiji XV

Stirling

=== Scotland ===
24 November 2002

Scotland	36–22	Fiji
Try: Craig (3); Grimes; Laney; Con: Laney; Pen: Laney (3)		Try: Ligairi; Naevo; Pen: Narruhn (4)

Murrayfield, Edinburgh
Attendance: 37,000
Referee: Mark Lawrence (South Africa)

Scotland: 15. Ben Hinshelwood, 14. Nikki Walker, 13. Andy Craig, 12. Brendan Laney, 11. Chris Paterson, 10. Gregor Townsend, 9. Bryan Redpath(capt), 8. Tom Smith, 7. Gordon Bulloch, 6. Bruce Douglas, 5. Jason White, 4. Simon Taylor, 3. Stuart Grimes, 2. Budge Pountney, 1. Jon Petrie – Replacements: 16. Steve Scott, 18. Nathan Hines, 19. Martin Leslie (yellow card) , 20. Graeme Beveridge, 21. Gordon Ross, 22. Stuart Moffat – Unused: 17. Dave Hilton
Fiji: 15. Atonio Nariva, 14. Fero Lasagavibau, 13. Epeli Ruivadra, 12. Seremaia Baikeinuku, 11. Norman Ligairi, 10. Joseph Narruhn, 9. Jacob Rauluni, 8. Seta Tawake Naivaluwaqa, 7. Alfie Mocelutu, 6. Sisa Koyamaibole (yellow card) , 5. Simon Raiwalui, 4. Apenisa Naevo, 3. Bill Cavubati, 2. Greg Smith (yellow card) , 1. Isaia Rasila – Replacements: 17. Bill Gadolo, 18. Kele Leawere, 19. Emori Katalau, 20. Waisale Serevi, 21. Viliame Satala – Unused: 16. Paula Biutanaseva, 22. Isaac Mow
