= List of Commonwealth Games medallists in rugby sevens =

This is the complete list of Commonwealth Games medallists in rugby sevens from 1998 to 2014.

== Medallists ==
=== Men ===
Games	Gold	Silver	Bronze
1998	New Zealand; Amasio Valence; Bruce Reihana; Caleb Ralph; Christian Cullen; Dallas Seymour; Eric Rush; Joeli Vidiri; Jonah Lomu; Rico Gear; Roger Randle	Fiji; Aparama Bosekora; Jope Tuikabe; Ratu Doviverata; Senirusi Rauqe; Saimoni Rokini; Setareki Tawake; Sirilo Lala; Tinasau Akuila; Marika Vunibaka; Waisale Serevi	Australia; Brendan Williams; Cameron Pither; David Campese; Ipolito Fenukitau; Jim Williams; Marc Stcherbina; Matthew Dowling; Richard Graham; Rick Nalatu; Tyron Mandrusiak
2002	New Zealand; Amasio Valence; Anthony Tuitavake; Brad Fleming; Bruce Reihana; Chris Masoe; Craig De Goldi; Craig Newby; Eric Rush; Karl Te Nana; Mils Muliaina; Rodney So'oialo; Roger Randle	Fiji; Epeli Ruivadra; Iosefo Koroiadi; Jope Tuikabe; Josefa Uluivuda; Norman Ligairi; Ratu Saukawa; Rupeni Caucaunibuca; Saiasi Fuli; Seru Rabeni; Viliame Satala; Vilimoni Delasau; Waisale Serevi	South Africa; Anton Pitout; Conrad Jantjes; Dale Heidtmann; Egon Seconds; Eugene Francis; Fabian Juries; Gaffie du Toit; Jorrie Muller; Ian Fihlani; Jean de Villiers; Luke Watson; Paul Treu
2006	New Zealand; Josh Blackie; Alando Soakai; Tanerau Latimer; Onosai Tololima-Auva'a; Amasio Valence; Liam Messam; Tamati Ellison; Tafai Ioasa; Nigel Hunt; Cory Jane; Lote Raikabula; Sosene Anesi	England; Henry Paul; Magnus Lund; Ben Russell; David Seymour; Nils Mordt; Richard Haughton; Thomas Varndell; Andy Vilk; Danny Care; Ben Gollings; Simon Amor; Mathew Tait	Fiji; Apolosi Satala; Dale Tonawai; Semisi Naevo; Sireli Naqelevuki; Viliame Satala; Waisale Serevi; Jone Daunivucu; Norman Ligairi; Neumi Nanuku; Filimoni Bolavucu; Lepani Nabuliwaqa; William Ryder
2010	New Zealand; Ben Smith; Benjamin Souness; Derek Forbes; Hosea Gear; Kurt Baker; Liam Messam; Lote Raikabula; Sherwin Stowers; Tim Mikkelson; Toby Arnold; Tomasi Cama; Zac Guildford	Australia; Bernard Foley; Shaun Foley; Ed Jenkins; James Stannard; Kimami Sitauti; Lachlan Turner; Liam Gill; Luke Morahan; Nick Phipps; Nick Cummins; Pat McCutcheon; Robbie Coleman	South Africa; Tera Mtembu; Cecil Afrika; Ockert Kruger; Renfred Dazel; Rayno Benjamin; Paul Delport; Bernado Botha; Chase Minnaar; Boom Prinsloo; Neil Powell; S'bura Sithole; MJ Mentz
2014	South Africa; Branco du Preez; Cecil Afrika Chris Dry; Cornal Hendricks; Frankie Horne; Justin Geduld; Kyle Brown; Kwagga Smith; Mark Richards; Seabelo Senatla; Werner Kok; Warren Whiteley	New Zealand; Pita Ahki; Scott Curry; Sam Dickson; DJ Forbes; Bryce Heem; Akira Ioane; Gillies Kaka; Ben Lam; Tim Mikkelson; Declan O'Donnell; Sherwin Stowers; Joe Webber	Australia; Cameron Clark; Tom Cusack; Pama Fou; Con Foley; Liam Gill; Greg Jeloudev; Tom Lucas; Sean McMahon; Sam Myers; James Stannard
2018 Men	New Zealand; Scott Curry; Tim Mikkelson; Trael Joass; Etene Nanai-Seturo; Dylan Collier; Vilimoni Koroi; Sam Dickson; Andrew Knewstubb; Regan Ware; Kurt Baker; Akuila Rokolisoa; Sione Molia	Fiji; Sevuloni Mocenacagi; Josua Vakurunabili; Kalione Nasoko; Paula Dranisinukula; Semi Kunatani; Jasa Veremalua; Mesulame Kunavula; Vatemo Ravouvou; Jerry Tuwai; Alasio Naduva; Eroni Sau; Amenoni Nasilasila; Samisoni Viriviri	England; Richard de Carpentier; Mike Ellery; Phil Burgess; Dan Norton; James Rodwell; Tom Mitchell; Dan Bibby; Alex Davis; Ollie Lindsay-Hague; Ruaridh McConnochie; Ethan Waddleton; Harry Glover

=== Women ===
Games	Gold	Silver	Bronze
2018 Women	New Zealand; Alena Saili; Shakira Baker; Stacey Waaka; Niall Williams; Sarah Goss; Michaela Blyde; Tyla Nathan-Wong; Kelly Brazier; Gayle Broughton; Theresa Fitzpatrick; Portia Woodman; Tenika Willison; Risi Pouri-Lane	Australia; Shannon Parry; Sharni Williams; Demi Hayes; Dominique du Toit; Emma Tonegato; Vani Pelite; Charlotte Caslick; Cassie Staples; Emma Sykes; Alicia Quirk; Emilee Cherry; Ellia Green; Georgie Friedrichs	England; Claire Allan; Abbie Brown; Lydia Thompson; Emily Scarratt; Natasha Hunt; Deborah Fleming; Heather Fisher; Emily Scott; Alex Matthews; Megan Jones; Jess Breach; Amy Wilson-Hardy; Victoria Fleetwood
