= 2005 Fiji rugby union tour of Europe =

Summary
P	W	D	L
Total
3	1	0	2
Test match
3	1	0	2
Opponent
P	W	D	L
Wales
1	0	0	1
Portugal
1	1	0	0
Italy
1	0	0	1

The 2005 Fiji rugby union tour of Europe was a series of matches played in November 2005 in Europe by Fiji national rugby union team.

== Results ==
12 November 2005

Wales	11–10	Fiji
Try: Owen; Pen: Robinson; Drop: Robinson		Try: Rawaqa; Con: Vulakoro; Drop: Baikeinuku

Millennium Stadium, Cardiff
Attendance: 73,000
Referee: Robert Dickson (Scotland)

Wales: 15. Lee Byrne, 14. Kevin Morgan, 13. Matthew Watkins, 12. Sonny Parker, 11. Shane Williams, 10. Nicky Robinson, 9. Gareth Cooper, 8. Michael Owen (c), 7. Martyn Williams, 6. Dafydd Jones, 5. Luke Charteris, 4. Brent Cockbain, 3. Chris Horsman, 2. T.Rhys Thomas, 1. John Yapp – Replacements: 17. Adam Jones, 18. Robert Sidoli, 20. Alix Popham, 21. Mike Phillips, 22. Ceri Sweeney – Unused: 16. Huw Bennett, 19. Robin Sowden-Taylor
Fiji: 15. Norman Ligairi, 14. Mosese Luveitasau, 13. Epeli Ruivadra, 12. Julian Vulakoro, 11. Sireli Bobo, 10. Seremaia Baikeinuku, 9. Moses Rauluni (c), 8. Sisa Koyamaibole, 7. Aca Ratuva, 6. Alifereti Doviverata, 5. Isoa Domolailai (yellow card) , 4. Ifereimi Rawaqa, 3. Apisai Nagi Mavua, 2. Sunia Koto, 1. Josese Baleikasavu – Replacements: 16. Bill Gadolo, 18. Kele Leawere, 19. Mosese Volavola, 20. Kini Salabogi, 22. Kameli Ratuvou – Unused: 17. Tiko Matawalu, 21. Aporosa Vata Tuinasau

19 November 2005

Portugal	17–26	Fiji
Try: Aguilar, J Ferreira; Con: Pinto 2 Pen: Pinto		Try: Gadolo, Kunavore; Qovu, Ratuvou; Con: Prasad 2, Vulakoro

Universitario, Lisbon
Referee: Scott Young (Australia)

Portugal: 15. Pedro Leal, 14. António Aguilar, 13. Miguel Portela, 12. Diogo Mateus, 11. Frederico Sousa, 10. Duarte Pinto, 9. José Pinto, 8. Vasco Uva, 7. João Uva (c), 6. Diego Coutinho, 5. Gonçalo Uva, 4. Marcelo d'Orey Branco, 3. Joaquim Ferreira, 2. João Correia, 1. Rui Cordeiro – Replacements: 16. Pedro Fonseca, 18. Arnaud Ferreira, 19. David Penalva, 20. Luis Pissarra, 21. Felipe Grenho, 22. Pedro Carvalho – Unused: 17. Rodrigo Aguiar
Fiji: 15. Jo Tora, 14. Neumi Nanuku, 13. Maleli Kunavore, 12. Kameli Ratuvou, 11. Sireli Bobo, 10. Jack Prasad, 9. Moses Rauluni (c), 8. Jone Qovu, 7. Mo Volavola, 6. Kini Salabogi, 5. Kele Leawere, 4. Ifereimi Rawaqa, 3. Apisai Nagi Mavua, 2. Bill Gadolo, 1. Tiko Matawalu – Replacements: 16. Sikeli Gavidi Tubuvanere, 17. Apisai Turukawa, 18. Akapusi Qera, 19. Sisa Koyamaibole, 21. Julian Vulakoro, 22. Epeli Ruivadra – Unused: 20. Saiasi Fuli

26 November 2005

Italy	23–8	Fiji
Try: Mi. Bergamasco, Ongaro; Con: Pez 2 Pen: Pez 3		Try: Luveitasau; Pen: Baikeinuku

Stadio Brianteo, Monza
Attendance: 12,000
Referee: Tappe Henning (South Africa)

Italy: 15. Ezio Galon, 14. Samuele Pace, 13. Mirco Bergamasco, 12. Gonzalo Canale, 11. Ludovico Nitoglia, 10. Ramiro Pez, 9. Paul Griffen, 8. Sergio Parisse (yellow card) , 7. Mauro Bergamasco, 6. Alessandro Zanni, 5. Marco Bortolami (c), 4. Carlo Del Fava, 3. Martin Castrogiovanni, 2. Fabio Ongaro, 1. Matías Agüero – Replacements: 17. Carlos Nieto, 18. Valerio Bernabò, 19. Maurizio Zaffiri, 20. Pablo Canavosio, 22. Rima Wakarua – Unused: 16. Carlo Festuccia, 21. Luciano Orquera
Fiji: 15. Norman Ligairi, 14. Mosese Luveitasau, 13. Epeli Ruivadra, 12. Seremaia Baikeinuku, 11. Kameli Ratuvou, 10. Nicky Little, 9. Moses Rauluni (c), 8. Sisa Koyamaibole, 7. Aca Ratuva, 6. Alifereti Doviverata, 5. Kele Leawere, 4. Ifereimi Rawaqa (yellow card) , 3. Apisai Nagi Mavua, 2. Sunia Koto, 1. Josese Baleikasavu – Replacements: 16. Sikeli Gavidi Tubuvanere, 17. Bill Gadolo, 18. Jone Qovu, 19. Mosese Volavola, 20. Aporosa Vata Tuinasau, 21. Kini Salabogi, 22. Maleli Kunavore
