= Apisai Nagata =

Fijian rugby union footballer

- Born: Nawaka, Nadi, Fiji
- Notable relative: Apisai Nagata Rogu (nephew)

Rugby union career
- Position: Flanker
Senior career
Years	Team	Apps	(Points)
- Nawaka
- Nadi
- Colombo Hockey and Football Club
- Kandy Sports Club
International career
Years	Team	Apps	(Points)
1987	Fiji	0	(0)
National sevens team
Years	Team		Comps
1991-1992	Sri Lanka 7s		1991-92

Apisai Nagata, sometimes misspelled as Apisai Nasata (born date of birth unknown in Nadi) is a Fijian former rugby union footballer, he played as flanker.

== Career ==
Nagata hails from Nawaka, the same village who produced rugby stars, such as Manasa Qoro, Savenaca Aria, Esala Labalaba, the late Sanivalati Laulau, Lalai Driu, Aminiasi Nava, Apisai Naevo and Semisi Naevo. He was in the 1987 Rugby World Cup roster, when during the pool match against Italy, in Dunedin, on 31 May 1987, he was in the substitute bench as second-choice loosehead flanker, but did not play any match in the tournament. Nagata also played several rugby seasons in Sri Lanka, moving to Colombo Hockey and Football Club in 1986, becoming the first Fijian to play in a Sri Lankan rugby union club, and then, for Kandy Sports Club. Nagata also played for Sri Lanka sevens in the 1991-92 Hong Kong Sevens.
