= 2005 Rugby World Cup Sevens =

Rugby tournament held in Hong Kong

2005年橄欖球七人欖球賽

Tournament details
- Host nation: Hong Kong
- Dates: March 18 – March 20
- No. of nations: 24

Final positions
- Champions: Fiji
- Runner-up: New Zealand

Tournament statistics
- Attendance: 120,000

The 2005 Rugby World Cup Sevens or the Melrose Cup was the fourth edition of the Rugby World Cup Sevens. The tournament was held in Hong Kong at Hong Kong Stadium. Fiji defeated New Zealand in the final to take the Melrose Cup for the second time, becoming the first team to win the competition twice. The Tournament broke all previous broadcast and attendance records, attracting a capacity audience of 120,000 spectators across for three competition days, while television coverage of the event reached over 450 million homes.

== Teams ==
- Argentina
- Australia
- Canada
- Chinese Taipei
- England
- Fiji
- France
- Georgia
- Hong Kong (Hosts)
- Ireland
- Italy
- Japan
- Kenya
- New Zealand (Holders)
- Portugal
- Russia
- Samoa
- Scotland
- South Africa
- South Korea
- Tonga
- Tunisia
- United States
- Uruguay

== Group stage ==
Key to colours in group tables
Teams advanced to the Cup quarter-final
Teams advanced to the Plate quarter-final
Teams advanced to the Bowl quarter-final

=== Pool A ===
Pos	Team	Pld	W	D	L	PF	PA	PD	Pts
1	New Zealand	5	5	0	0	211	17	+194	15
2	Scotland	5	4	0	1	114	98	+16	13
3	United States	5	2	0	3	88	145	−57	9
4	Ireland	5	2	0	3	86	140	−54	9
5	South Korea	5	1	0	4	66	152	−86	7
6	Tonga	5	1	0	4	72	85	−13	7

=== Pool B ===
Pos	Team	Pld	W	D	L	PF	PA	PD	Pts
1	England	5	4	0	1	158	35	+123	13
2	France	5	4	0	1	130	48	+82	13
3	Samoa	5	4	0	1	120	41	+79	13
4	Georgia	5	1	1	3	56	152	−96	8
5	Chinese Taipei	5	1	0	4	56	157	−101	7
6	Italy	5	0	1	4	46	133	−87	6

=== Pool C ===
Pos	Team	Pld	W	D	L	PF	PA	PD	Pts
1	Fiji	5	5	0	0	178	19	+159	15
2	Australia	5	4	0	1	138	69	+69	13
3	Japan	5	3	0	2	64	107	−43	11
4	Portugal	5	2	0	3	50	85	−35	9
5	Canada	5	1	0	4	83	91	−8	7
6	Hong Kong	5	0	0	5	15	157	−142	5

=== Pool D ===
Pos	Team	Pld	W	D	L	PF	PA	PD	Pts
1	South Africa	5	4	0	1	173	48	+125	13
2	Argentina	5	4	0	1	138	48	+90	13
3	Tunisia	5	3	0	2	93	70	+23	11
4	Russia	5	2	0	3	86	160	−74	9
5	Kenya	5	2	0	3	75	124	−49	9
6	Uruguay	5	0	0	5	45	160	−115	5

== Play Offs ==
=== Bowl ===
Quarter-finals
South Korea	21
Italy	26
Kenya	62
Hong Kong	10
Canada	39
Uruguay	0
Chinese Taipei	19
Tonga	28

Semi-finals
Italy	28
Kenya	15
Canada	7
Tonga	0

Final
Italy	7
Canada	5

=== Plate ===
Quarter-finals
United States	0
Georgia	24
Tunisia	12
Portugal	21
Japan	5
Russia	29
Samoa	19
Ireland	14

Semi-finals
Georgia	5
Portugal	29
Russia	12
Samoa	19

Final
Portugal	7
Samoa	29

=== Cup ===
Quarter-finals
New Zealand	33
France	7
South Africa	14
Australia	15
Fiji	22
Argentina	14
England	36
Scotland	0

Semi-finals
New Zealand	24
Australia	20
Fiji	24
England	19

Final
New Zealand	19
Fiji	29

2005 Rugby World Cup Sevens winners

Fiji
2nd title

Team roster

Serevi, Bobo, Delasau, Ryder, Vunibaka,

Naevo, Roko, Rawaqa, Daunivucu,

Nabuliwaqa, Ligairi, V. Satala, A. Satala

== See also ==
- Rugby World Cup Sevens
- Rugby World Cup
