= Naevo =

Naevo is a Fijian surname. Notable people with the surname include:

- Apisai Naevo (died 2008), Fijian politician and father of the following:
  - Apenisa Naevo (born 1973), Fijian rugby union player
  - Semisi Naevo (born 1976), Fijian rugby union player
