= 2002 end-of-year rugby union internationals =

The 2002 end-of-year tests, also known as the 2002 Autumn Internationals, are international rugby union matches that took place during November and December 2002. The matches were contested between touring teams from the southern hemisphere, namely Australia, Argentina, New Zealand, and South Africa and teams from the Six Nations Championship - England, France, Ireland, Italy, Scotland and Wales. Some matches also featured second-tier European sides Romania, Russia and Georgia, and South Pacific nation Fiji.

The 2002 end-of-year tests featured one of the biggest results in rugby union history, as South Africa suffered their heaviest ever defeat, losing 53–3 to England on 23 November. This result saw England record back-to-back wins against New Zealand, Australia and South Africa in consecutive weeks - the only occasion in rugby history that any nation has achieved this feat.

== Fixtures ==
=== Week 1 ===
1 November 2002
19:30 GMT

Wales	40–3	Romania
Try: S. Quinnell; M. Jones; Gar. Thomas; Penalty try Con: Jenkins (4); Pen: Jenkins (4)	Report	Pen: Tofan

Racecourse Ground, Wrexham
Attendance: 9,448
Referee: Joël Jutge (France)

2 November 2002
20:10 ART (UTC-3)

Argentina	6–17	Australia
Pen: Contepomi (2)	Report	Try: Mortlock; Pen: Burke (3); Flatley

Estadio Monumental Antonio Vespucio Liberti, Buenos Aires
Attendance: 65,000
Referee: Kelvin Deaker (New Zealand)

=== Week 2 ===
9 November 2002
14:30 GMT

England	31–28	New Zealand
Try: Moody; Wilkinson; Cohen; Con: Wilkinson (2/3); Pen: Wilkinson (3); Drop: Wilkinson	Report	Try: Lomu (2); Howlett; Lee; Con: Blair (2); Mehrtens (2)

Twickenham Stadium, London
Attendance: 75,000
Referee: Jonathan Kaplan (South Africa)

9 November 2002
14:30 GMT

Ireland	18–9	Australia
Pen: O'Gara (6)	Report	Pen: Burke (3)

Lansdowne Road, Dublin
Attendance: 49,000
Referee: Steve Walsh (New Zealand)

9 November 2002
16:30 GMT

Scotland	37–10	Romania
	Report

Murrayfield Stadium, Edinburgh
Attendance: 34,413
Referee: Andy Turner (South Africa)

9 November 2002
16:30 GMT

Wales	58–14	Fiji
Try: R. Williams; M. Jones (2); Charvis; Parker; Gar. Thomas; Penalty try Con: S. Jones (5); Pen: S. Jones (3); Harris	Report	Try: Ligairi; Serevi; Con: Little; Serevi

Millennium Stadium, Cardiff
Attendance: 34,103
Referee: Stuart Dickinson (Australia)

9 November 2002
20:45 CET (UTC+1)

France	30–10	South Africa
Try: Clerc; Heymans; Con: Gelez (1/2); Pen: Gelez (5); Drop: Castaignède	Report	Try: Van Niekerk; Con: Pretorius; Pen: Pretorius

Stade Velodrome, Marseille
Attendance: 57,203
Referee: Alain Rolland (Ireland)

=== Week 3 ===
16 November 2002
15:15 CET (UTC+1)

Italy	6–36	Argentina
Pen: Domínguez (2)	Report	Try: Albanese; Corleto; Durand; Martín; Orengo; Con: Contepomi (2); Fernández Miranda (2); Pen: Contepomi

Stadio Flaminio, Rome
Attendance: 23,263
Referee: Andrew Cole (Australia)

16 November 2002
14:30 GMT

England	32–31	Australia
Try: Cohen (2); Con: Wilkinson (2/2); Pen: Wilkinson (6)	Report	Try: Flatley (2); Sailor; Con: Burke (2/3); Pen: Burke (4)

Twickenham Stadium, London
Attendance: 75,000
Referee: Paul Honiss (New Zealand)

16 November 2002
14:30 GMT

Scotland	21–6	South Africa
Try: Pountney; Walker; Con: Laney (1/2); Pen: Laney (3)	Report	Pen: James (2)

Murrayfield Stadium, Edinburgh
Attendance: 58,225
Referee: Nigel Williams (Wales)

16 November 2002
20:45 CET (UTC+1)

France	20–20	New Zealand
Try: Brusque; Magne; Con: Gelez (2/2); Pen: Gelez (2)	Report	Try: Umaga; Meeuws; Con: Mehrtens (2/2); Pen: Mehrtens (2)

Stade de France, Saint-Denis
Attendance: 78,625
Referee: Scott Young (Australia)

16 November 2002
16:30 GMT

Wales	32–21	Canada
Try: McBryde; J. Robinson; Con: S. Jones (2); Pen: S. Jones (6)	Report	Pen: Barker; Drop: Williams

Millennium Stadium, Cardiff
Attendance: 30,586
Referee: Giulio de Santis (Italy)

17 November 2002
15:00 GMT

Ireland	64–17	Fiji
Try: Murphy (2); Maggs (3); O'Driscoll; Bishop; Dawson; Foley; Con: Humphreys (4); Pen: Humphreys (3)	Report	Try: Doviverata; Narruhn; Con: Little; Serevi; Pen: Little

Lansdowne Road, Dublin
Attendance: 31,482
Referee: Nigel Whitehouse (Wales)

=== Week 4 ===
23 November 2002
14:00 CET (UTC+1)

France	35–3	Canada
	Report

Stade de France, Saint-Denis
Attendance: 48,000
Referee: David McHugh (Ireland)

23 November 2002
15:15 CET (UTC+1)

Italy	3–34	Australia
Pen: Pez	Report	Try: Harrison; Kefu; Mortlock; Staniforth (2); Con: Burke (3/5); Pen: Burke

Stadio Luigi Ferraris, Genoa
Attendance: 20,000
Referee: Pablo Deluca (Argentina)

23 November 2002
14:30 GMT

Wales	17–43	New Zealand
Try: Robinson 14' c Penalty try 79' c Con: S. Jones (1/1) 15'; Harris (1/1) 79'; Pen: S. Jones (1/1) 8'	Report	Try: Howlett 19' c, 80+1' c Meeuws 80+5' c King 80+8' c Con: Mehrtens (4/4) 20', 80+2', 80+6', 80+9'; Pen: Mehrtens (5/6) 11', 17', 40+1', 43', 63'

Millennium Stadium, Cardiff
Attendance: 68,785
Referee: Tappe Henning (South Africa)

23 November 2002
14:30 GMT

England	53–3	South Africa
Try: Cohen 20' m Greenwood 30' c, 42' c Penalty try 60' c Back 69' c Hill 74' c Dallaglio 80+2' c Con: Wilkinson (1/2) 30'; Dawson (1/1) 43'; Gomarsall (2/2) 61', 70'; Stimpson (2/2) 75', 80+3'; Pen: Wilkinson (1/1) 12'	Report	Pen: Pretorius (1/1) 37'

Twickenham Stadium, London
Attendance: 72,000
Referee: Paddy O'Brien (New Zealand)

- Jannes Labuschagne (South Africa) was shown a red card after 22 minutes.
- This was South Africa's biggest defeat in their history until a 57–0 defeat to New Zealand in September 2017.

23 November 2002
16:30 GMT

Ireland	16–7	Argentina
Try: Dempsey 20'; Con: O'Gara (1/1) 21'; Pen: O'Gara (3/3) 33', 43', 65'	Report	Try: Martín 23'; Con: Contepomi (1/1) 25'

Lansdowne Road, Dublin
Attendance: 40,000
Referee: Chris White (England)

24 November 2002
15:00 GMT

Scotland	36–22	Fiji
Try: Craig (3) 9' c, 29' m, 73' m Laney 62' m Grimes 80+5' m Con: Laney (1/5) 10'; Pen: Laney (3/3) 22', 25', 58'	Report	Try: Naevo 50' m Ligairi 80' m Pen: Narruhn (4/4) 14', 19', 32', 36'

Murrayfield Stadium, Edinburgh
Attendance: 37,351
Referee: Mark Lawrence (South Africa)

== See also ==
- End of year rugby union tests
- Mid-year rugby union tests
