= Apisai =

Apisai is a given name of Fijian origin and may refer to:

- Apisai Driu Baibai (born 1970), Fijian sprinter
- Apisai Domolailai (born 1989), Fijian rugby union player
- Apisai Ielemia (born 1955), Tuvaluan politician
- Apisai Koroisau (born 1992), Australian-Fijian rugby league player
- Apisai Naevo (d. 2008), Fijian chief
- Apisai Nagata, Fijian rugby union footballer
- Apisai Naikatini (born 1985), Fijian rugby union player
- Apisai Naqalevu (born 1989), Fijian rugby union and rugby sevens player
- Apisai Smith (born 1985), Fijian footballer
- Apisai Tauyavuca (born 1993), Fijian rugby union player
- Apisai Tora (1934–2020), Fijian politician, soldier, and trade unionist

== See also ==
- Leni Apisai (born 1996), New Zealand rugby union player
- Apisa, a genus of moths
