= Lepani =

Lepani is a surname, commonly used in Papua New Guinea. Notable people with the surname include:

- Andrew Lepani (born 1979), Papua New Guinean footballer
- Charles Lepani (1947–2025), Papua New Guinean public servant and diplomat
- Nathaniel Lepani (born 1982), Papua New Guinean footballer

== See also ==
- Lepani Nabuliwaqa (born 1980), Fijian rugby union footballer
