= Apted (surname) =

Apted is a surname. Notable people with the surname include:

- Charles R. Apted (1873–1941), American university staff member
- Harry Apted (1925–2016), Fijian cricketer
- Michael R. Apted (died 2002), British archaeologist
- Michael Apted (1941–2021), British television and film director and producer
- Paul Apted (1967–2014), British-American sound editor
- Roy Apted (born 1937), Australian rules footballer
- William Apted (born 1930), Fijian cricketer
