= Manasa Qoro =

Fijian rugby union player (1964–2019)

- Born: 8 February 1964 Nawaka, Nadi, Fiji
- Died: 5 February 2019 (aged 54) Nawaka, Nadi, Fiji
- Height: 5 ft 8 in (1.73 m)
- Weight: 242 lb (110 kg)

Rugby union career
- Position: Flanker
Senior career
Years	Team	Apps	(Points)
- Nawaka Rugby Club
1984-1989	Nadi		
1989-1991	Kandy Sports Club		
1991-1994	Colombo Hockey and Football Club		
International career
Years	Team	Apps	(Points)
1987-1989	Fiji	4	(11)

Manasa Qoro (8 February 1964 – 5 February 2019), was a Fijian rugby union player. He played as a flanker.

== Career ==
He started his career for the Nawaka Rugby Club before being named in the Nadi team in 1984. Three years later he made his debut in the Fiji Sevens team before being selected for the Fijian side to the 1987 Rugby World Cup in New Zealand. Qoro made his debut for the Flying Fijians against Queensland in April 1987 before being selected for the Rugby World Cup in May. His memorable moment was when he scored a drop goal from more than 40 metres in the match against Italy, becoming the first forward in world rugby to score points from a drop goal in a world cup match. His contribution enabled his team to become the first Flying Fijians outfit to reach the world cup quarter-final long before the Ilivasi Tabua-coached side repeated the feat in 2007. His last international match for the Flying Fijians was during the match against Belgium, at Liège, on 7 October 1989. In that year, Qoro moved to Sri Lanka to play for Kandy until 1991, where he played for Colombo Hockey and Football Club until 1994. He died on 5 February 2019, aged 54.
