= Savenaca Aria =

Fijian rugby union footballer (1964–2020)

- Full name: Savenaca Aria
- Born: 30 April 1964 Nawaka, Nadi, Fiji
- Died: 15 March 2020 (aged 55) Nawaka, Nadi, Fiji
- Height: 6 ft 1 in (1.85 m)
- Weight: 210 lb (95 kg)

Rugby union career
- Position: Centre
Senior career
Years	Team	Apps	(Points)
19??–19??	Nawaka		
19??–1994	Nadi		
International career
Years	Team	Apps	(Points)
1986–1994	Fiji	10	(8)
Coaching career
- Years: Team
- 2001: Nadi
- 2002 (assistant coach): Fiji

Savenaca Aria (30 April 1964 – 15 March 2020) was a Fijian rugby union footballer and later a coach. He played as a centre.

== Career ==
As player, he played as outside centre for Nawaka. In 1986 he played for Queensland in the Australian Provincial Championship. Aria's first cap for Fiji was during a match against Wales, at Suva, on May 31, 1986. Despite not being part of the 1987 Rugby World Cup roster, four years later, he was called in the 1991 Rugby World Cup roster, playing two matches in the tournament. His last international cap was during a match against Japan, at Ehime, on May 8, 1994. In addition, he also played rugby sevens for the Nadi provincial team in the Fijian championship and played in the Hong Kong Sevens in 1987 and 1988 for the Fiji national team.

== Coaching career ==
Aria coached Nadi in 2001 and, a year later, in 2002, he became the assistant coach for Sanivalati Laulau in the Fiji national rugby union team. In 2009, he led the Fiji Police team, which won the Ratu Sukuna Cup, defeating the Fiji Armed Forces team (the team's fifth consecutive victory). He had the rank of police sergeant. He also served as President of the Blue Football Club, which participated in the championship of the Nadi province.

== Death ==
Aria died on 15 March 2020, at his residence in Nawaka, Nadi, aged 55. He is survived by his wife Seru, five children and four grandchildren
