= Rasila =

Rasila is a surname. Notable people with the surname include:

- Isaia Rasila (1969–2010), Fijian rugby union player
- Jukka Rasila (born 1969), Finnish actor
