= Kini Salabogi =

- Full name: Kiniviliame Salabogi
- Born: 11 July 1978 (age 48) Lautoka, Fiji
- Height: 6 ft 4 in (193 cm)
- Weight: 231 lb (105 kg)

Rugby union career
- Position: Back-row
International career
Years	Team	Apps	(Points)
2005–06	Fiji	4	(5)
Medal record
Men's rugby sevens
Representing Fiji
World Games
Gold medal – first place	2005 Duisburg	Team competition

Kiniviliame Salabogi (born 11 July 1978) is a Fijian former international rugby union player.

== Rugby career ==
Born in Lautoka, Salabogi was a back-rower, who played in Fijian rugby for Nadroga. He also toured Australia with Davetalevu and played rugby in France for clubs including Union Bordeaux.

=== International ===
Salabogi made his early international appearances with the national rugby sevens team, competing in the IRB Sevens World Series. He had to be hospitalised on his return home from the 2003 Hong Kong Sevens with a serious respiratory infection and despite initial fears was cleared of having contracted the SARS virus. In 2005, Salabogi was in Fiji's gold medal-winning rugby sevens side at the World Games in Duisburg. Capped four times for the Fiji XV, Salabogi debuted in 2005 against Wales at Millennium Stadium. He scored a try in Fiji's win over Italy in front of a home crowd at Churchill Park, Lautoka in 2006.

== See also ==
- List of Fiji national rugby union players
