= Kilive Naloli =

Fijian-born Japanese rugby union player

- Born: June 29, 1975 (age 51) Fiji
- Height: 190 cm (6 ft 3 in)
- Weight: 100 kg (220 lb)

Rugby union career
Senior career
Years	Team	Apps	(Points)
- Hino Red Dolphins
International career
Years	Team	Apps	(Points)
2004-2005	Japan		

Kilive Naloli (born 26 September 1975) is a Fijian-born Japanese rugby union player. He plays as a centre. He played for the Japan national rugby sevens team in the 2003-04 IRB Sevens World Series and in the 2005 Rugby World Cup Sevens.
