= Fero Lasagavibau =

Fiji international rugby union player

- Born: 27 May 1976 (age 50)
- Height: 5 ft 9 in (1.75 m)
- Weight: 200 lb (14 st 4 lb; 91 kg)

Rugby union career
- Position: Wing
Amateur team(s)
Years	Team	Apps	(Points)
- Marist
–	Waipu		
Senior career
Years	Team	Apps	(Points)
199?-1997	Nadroga		
2005-2007	US Dax		
2007-2011	Stade Aurillacois		
2011-2012	Rugby Athlétic Club Angérien		
2012	Stade Rouennais		
Provincial / State sides
Years	Team	Apps	(Points)
1997-2004	Northland	64	(160)
International career
Years	Team	Apps	(Points)
1997-2002	Fiji	23	(80)
National sevens team
Years	Team		Comps
1996-2001	Fiji 7s		

Fero Lasagavibau (born 27 May 1976) is a Fijian former rugby union footballer. He made his debut for Fiji against the All Blacks in 1997. He took part at the 1999 Rugby World Cup, playing 3 matches in the tournament and made his last appearance for Fiji against Scotland in 2002. He also played for Northland in the National Provincial Championship.
