= Rugby sevens at the 2006 Commonwealth Games =

Rugby Sevens at the 2006 Commonwealth Games
- Venue: City of Manchester Stadium
- Location: Melbourne, Australia
- Dates: 16 to 17 March 2006

Medalists
gold medal	New Zealand
silver medal	England
bronze medal	Fiji

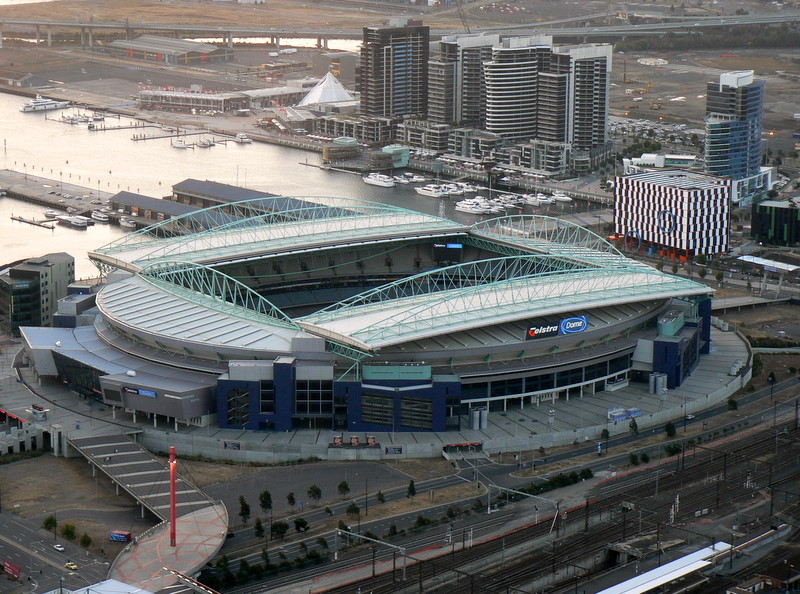
The Telstra Dome, host venue for the Rugby sevens

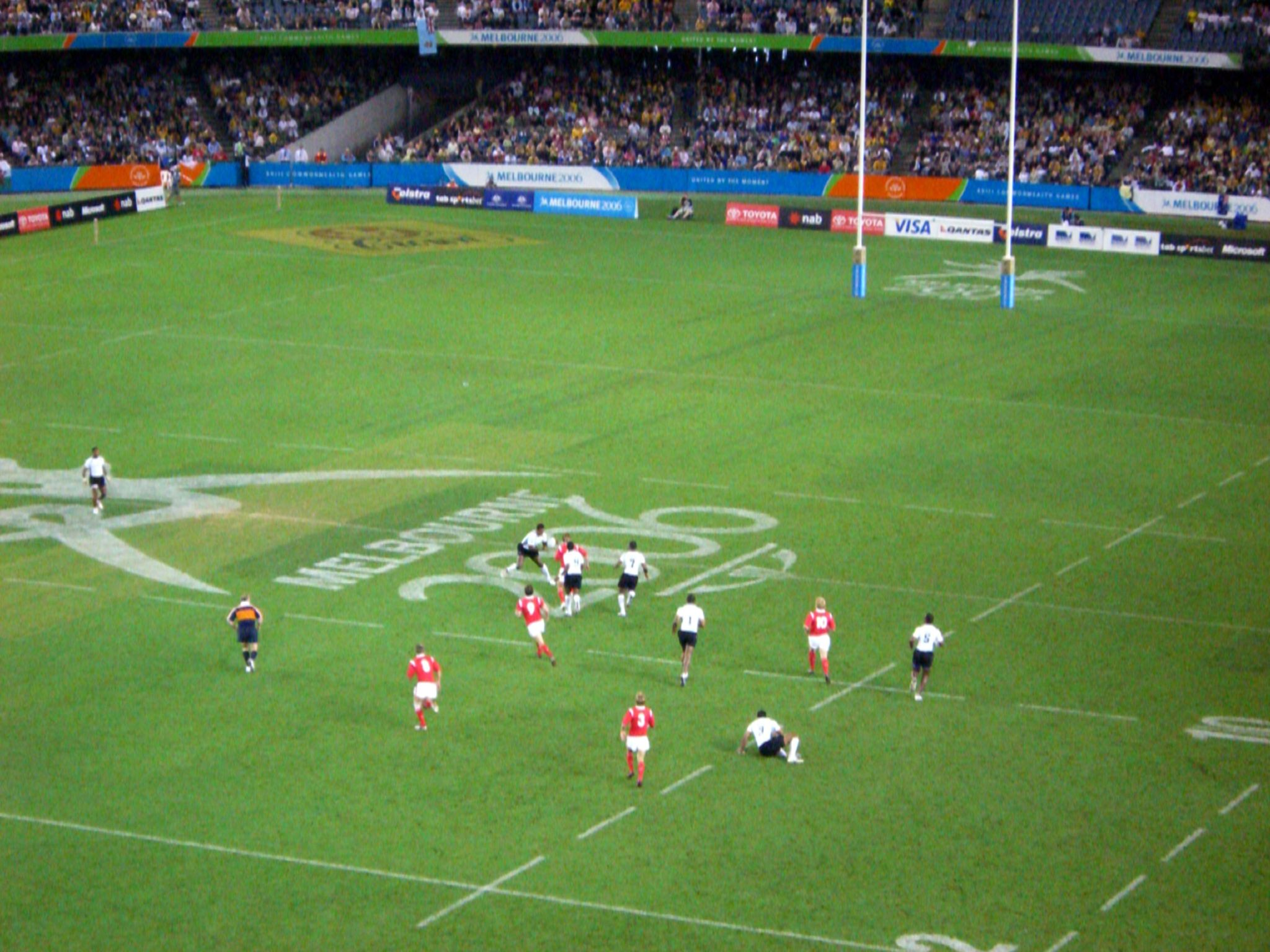
Fiji playing Wales

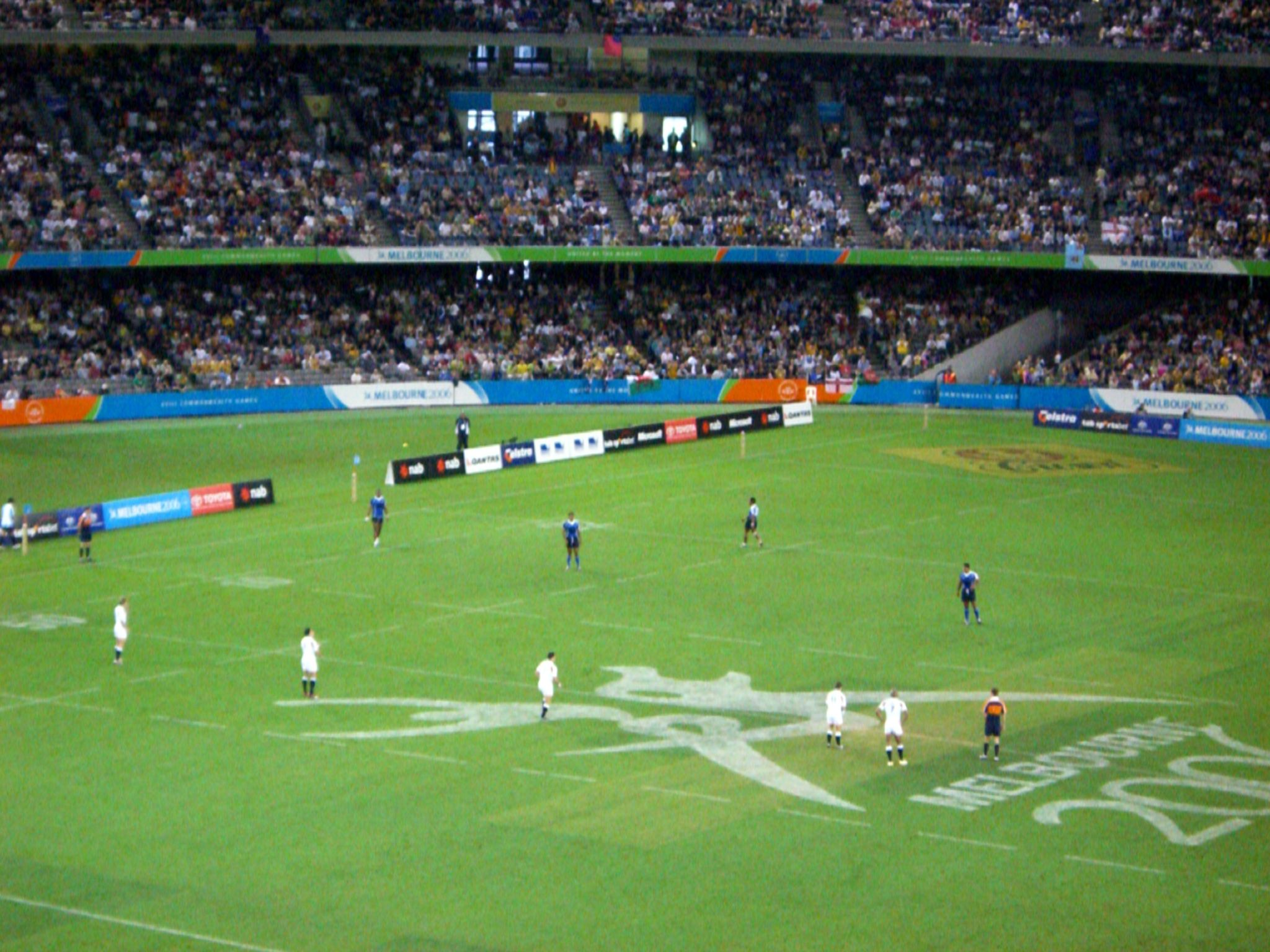
England playing Samoa

Rugby sevens at the 2006 Commonwealth Games was the third appearance of Rugby sevens at the Commonwealth Games. The rugby sevens competition was one of the male-only sports at the Commonwealth Games, the other being boxing. The venue for the rugby competition was the Telstra Dome, on the western edge of Melbourne's Central Business District. Preliminary matches were held on 16 March, with the finals the following day.

Sixteen teams competed in the rugby sevens tournament as they were separated into four groups of four. The top two teams of each group qualified through to the cup finals while the bottom two would compete in the bowl. After finishing on top of Pool A, New Zealand won the gold medal match as they defeated England 29–21 in the final on 17 March 2006. Fiji claimed the bronze medal defeating Australia 24–17 in the 3rd place final. In the minor finals, Wales took out the plate final with Kenya winning the bowl.

== Qualified teams ==
Continent	Qualifier(s)
Asia	Sri Lanka
Africa	Kenya; Namibia; South Africa; Uganda
Americas	Canada
Oceania	Cook Islands; Fiji; New Zealand; Niue; Samoa; Tonga
Europe	England; Scotland; Wales
Host nation	Australia

== Pool Stage ==
=== Group A ===
Team	Pld	W	D	L	PF	PA	PD	Pts
New Zealand	3	3	0	0	117	17	+100	9
Wales	3	2	0	1	83	42	+41	7
Kenya	3	1	0	2	31	79	−48	5
Namibia	3	0	0	3	19	112	−93	3

16 March 2006
11:14

New Zealand	35–10	Wales

Telstra Dome, Melbourne

16 March 2006
11:36

Kenya	31–5	Namibia

Telstra Dome, Melbourne

16 March 2006
14:20

New Zealand	41–7	Namibia

Telstra Dome, Melbourne

16 March 2006
14:42

Wales	33–0	Kenya

Telstra Dome, Melbourne

16 March 2006
19:50

New Zealand	41–0	Kenya

Telstra Dome, Melbourne

16 March 2006
21:28

Wales	40–7	Namibia

Telstra Dome, Melbourne

=== Group B ===
Team	Pld	W	D	L	PF	PA	PD	Pts
Fiji	3	3	0	0	127	21	+106	9
Canada	3	2	0	1	48	45	+3	7
Scotland	3	1	0	2	47	48	−1	5
Niue	3	0	0	3	12	120	−108	3

16 March 2006
10:30

Fiji	31–14	Canada

Telstra Dome, Melbourne

16 March 2006
10:52

Scotland	33–5	Niue

Telstra Dome, Melbourne

16 March 2006
13:36

Fiji	63–0	Niue

Telstra Dome, Melbourne

16 March 2006
13:58

Canada	10–7	Scotland

Telstra Dome, Melbourne

16 March 2006
19:28

Canada	24–7	Niue

Telstra Dome, Melbourne

16 March 2006
21:06

Fiji	33–7	Scotland

Telstra Dome, Melbourne

=== Group C ===
Team	Pld	W	D	L	PF	PA	PD	Pts
England	3	3	0	0	110	17	+93	9
Australia	3	2	0	1	113	33	+80	7
Cook Islands	3	1	0	2	71	63	+8	5
Sri Lanka	3	0	0	3	0	181	−181	3

16 March 2006
12:52

England	35–5	Cook Islands

Telstra Dome, Melbourne

16 March 2006
13:14

Australia	73–0	Sri Lanka

Telstra Dome, Melbourne

16 March 2006
18:44

England	61–0	Sri Lanka

Telstra Dome, Melbourne

16 March 2006
19:06

Australia	28–19	Cook Islands

Telstra Dome, Melbourne

16 March 2006
20:44

Cook Islands	47–0	Sri Lanka

Telstra Dome, Melbourne

16 March 2006
22:12

England	14–12	Australia

Telstra Dome, Melbourne

=== Group D ===
Team	Pld	W	D	L	PF	PA	PD	Pts
South Africa	3	2	0	1	94	43	+51	7
Samoa	3	2	0	1	66	22	+44	7
Tonga	3	1	0	2	40	68	−28	5
Uganda	3	1	0	2	41	108	−67	5

16 March 2006
11:58

Tonga	26–19	South Africa

Telstra Dome, Melbourne

16 March 2006
12:20

Samoa	31–10	Uganda

Telstra Dome, Melbourne

16 March 2006
18:00

South Africa	63–7	Uganda

Telstra Dome, Melbourne

16 March 2006
18:22

Samoa	25–0	Tonga

Telstra Dome, Melbourne

16 March 2006
20:22

Uganda	24–14	Tonga

Telstra Dome, Melbourne

16 March 2006
21:50

South Africa	12–10	Samoa

Telstra Dome, Melbourne

== Knock-out stage ==
=== Cup ===
Quarter-finals
17 March – Melbourne
New Zealand	24
Canada	0
17 March – Melbourne
Australia	20
South Africa	14
17 March – Melbourne
England	17
Samoa	14
17 March – Melbourne
Fiji	26
Wales	7

Semi-finals
17 March – Melbourne
New Zealand	21
Australia	19
17 March – Melbourne
England	21
Fiji	14

Gold Medal Match
17 March – Melbourne
New Zealand	29
England	21
Bronze Medal Match
17 March – Melbourne
Fiji	24
Australia	17

==== Quarter-finals ====
17 March 2006

New Zealand	24–0	Canada

Telstra Dome, Melbourne

17 March 2006

Australia	20–14	South Africa

Telstra Dome, Melbourne

17 March 2006

England	17–14	Samoa

Telstra Dome, Melbourne

17 March 2006

Fiji	26–7	Wales

Telstra Dome, Melbourne

==== Semi-finals ====
17 March 2006

New Zealand	21–19	Australia

Telstra Dome, Melbourne

17 March 2006

England	21–14	Fiji

Telstra Dome, Melbourne

==== Bronze medal match ====
17 March 2006

Fiji	24–17	Australia

Telstra Dome, Melbourne

==== Gold medal match ====
17 March 2006

New Zealand	29–21	England

Telstra Dome, Melbourne

=== Plate ===
For teams knocked out of the Cup quarter finals

==== Plate semi-finals ====
17 March 2006

South Africa	17–14	Canada

Telstra Dome, Melbourne

17 March 2006

Wales	26–17	Samoa

Telstra Dome, Melbourne

==== Plate final – Playoff for 5th and 6th ====
17 March 2006

Wales	29–28	South Africa

Telstra Dome, Melbourne

=== Bowl ===
==== Bowl-quarter-finals ====
17 March 2006

Kenya	21–5	Niue

Telstra Dome, Melbourne

17 March 2006

Uganda	24–12	Sri Lanka

Telstra Dome, Melbourne

17 March 2006

Tonga	31–12	Cook Islands

Telstra Dome, Melbourne

17 March 2006

Scotland	26–12	Namibia

Telstra Dome, Melbourne

==== Bowl semi-finals ====
17 March 2006

Kenya	29–0	Uganda

Telstra Dome, Melbourne

17 March 2006

Tonga	12–5	Scotland

Telstra Dome, Melbourne

==== Bowl final – Playoff for 9th and 10th ====
17 March 2006

Kenya	26–12	Tonga

Telstra Dome, Melbourne

== Medalists ==
Men's	Gold	Silver	Bronze
Men's	(New Zealand) New Zealand Josh Blackie; Alando Soakai; Tanerau Latimer; Onosai Tololima-Auva'a; Amasio Valence; Liam Messam; Tamati Ellison; Tafai Ioasa; Nigel Hunt; Cory Jane; Lote Raikabula; Sosene Anesi	England Henry Paul; Magnus Lund; Ben Russell; David Seymour; Nils Mordt; Richard Haughton; Thomas Varndell; Andrew Vilk; Danny Care; Ben Gollings; Simon Amor; Mathew Tait	(Fiji) Fiji Apolosi Satala; Ratu Mataluvu; Semisi Naevo; Sireli Naqelevuki; Viliame Satala; Waisale Serevi; Jone Daunivucu; Norman Ligairi; Neumi Nanuku; Filimoni Bolavucu; Lepani Nabuliwaqa; William Ryder

== See also ==
- Commonwealth Rugby Sevens Championships
- Rugby sevens
