= Osea Kolinisau =

Fijian rugby union player and Coach

Osea Kolinisau, OF
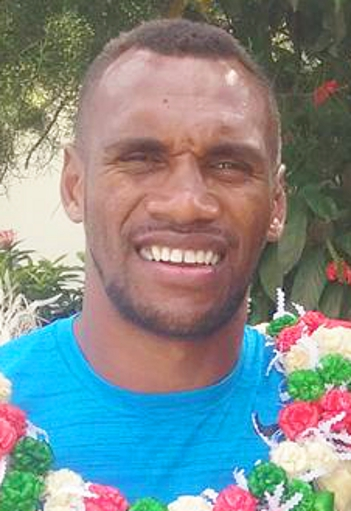
- Kolinisau in 2016
- Born: Ratu Osea Ramodi Kolinisau; 17 November 1985 (age 40) Suva, Fiji
- Height: 1.74 m (5 ft 9 in)
- Weight: 90 kg (14 st 2 lb; 198 lb)

Rugby union career
- Position: Head Coach
- Current team: Fiji Sevens
Senior career
Years	Team	Apps	(Points)
2017–2020	Houston SaberCats	24	(35)
2021	Old Glory DC	2	(10)
- Correct as of 10 July 2021
International career
Years	Team	Apps	(Points)
2008–2017	Fiji sevens	261	(1,131)
Medal record
Men's rugby sevens
Representing Fiji
Olympic Games
Gold medal – first place	2016 Rio de Janeiro	Team competition

Osea Kolinisau, OF (born 17 November 1985) is a Fijian rugby union player who plays for Old Glory DC of Major League Rugby (MLR). He captained the Fiji Sevens side to their first olympic gold medal in the 2016 Rio Olympics. He is currently the coach of Fiji Mens Sevens Rugby.

== Early life and education ==
Kolinisau was born in Suva, Fiji. He attended Ratu Sukuna Memorial School, where he started playing rugby. He went on to play club rugby for Covenant Brother Rugby Club and in the 2012 Coral Coast Sevens tournament, for the Serevi Selects.

== Career ==
=== Pre-Olympic career ===
Kolinisau debuted for Fiji in the 2008 Dubai Sevens tournament. After a stint playing 15 a side rugby during the 201/11 season for French club Agen in the French Top 14, he captained the first Fiji side to win the Dubai 7s for the 2013–14 Sevens World Series since the Sevens Series began. He was the winner of HSBC World Series Rugby Sevens 2014–2015 and 2015–2016.

He is best known for being the most capped player for the Fiji Sevens team and for leading Fiji to two consecutive first-place finishes in the HSBC World Rugby Sevens Series for the 2014–15 and the 2015–16 seasons. Osea is the 12th all-time HSBC Sevens Series point scorer with 1272 points. He played in 301 matches and scored 122 tries.

=== 2016 Rio Olympics ===
At the 2016 Rio Olympics, he was the flag bearer for team Fiji. He declared "Rugby is Fiji’s number one international sport, I was proud to be able to represent, not only myself and my team, but my family and my country as well. This was a huge achievement."

Kolinisau was captain for the Fiji sevens team and led them to the gold medal and Fiji's first ever medal at an Olympic Games. Fiji won by beating Team Great Britain in the final by 43–7 with Kolinisau scoring the first try.

=== Post-Olympic career ===
Following the Olympic Games, he was awarded the Officer of the Order of Fiji, which is presented for achievement and merit to Fiji and mankind as a whole. He is also depicted on a commemorative Fiji 7 Dollar Banknote.

His coach in the Fiji Sevens team, Ben Ryan, also arranged for a scholarship to be offered to attend Loughborough University, but soon after came the opportunity to go back to 15s and play in the inaugural Major League Rugby season for the Houston SaberCats. Kolinisau played for the SaberCats for the 2018–2020 seasons but left the team and played for the Asia Pacific Dragons at the World Tens Series in Bermuda in October and November 2020. Kolinisau signed with Old Glory DC of the MLR for two matches in April 2021.

Head Coach of Fiji Mens Sevens

Kolinisau now holds the top job of Fiji 7s Rugby. His appointment as the new head coach follows after the clear foreseeable sacking of his predecessor, Ben Gollings. Kolinisau lead the team forward starting March 8, 2024, four months out from the 2024 Paris Olympics.

== Personal life ==
Kolinisau is married to Mere Tavu Fa.

He is a devout Christian, and credits his faith for his achievements in rugby. "Getting to where I have come in my rugby career took a lot of hard work and training. I’m thankful for all of my father’s teaching and support. As a pastor, my father taught me that with hard work and faith in Jesus Christ, nothing is impossible. I’ve seen that come to fruition in my own life. I always dreamed of playing in the Rugby World Cup. And I was fortunate enough to play in the Olympic Games. I know that it was Christ who gave me my talent and I’m thankful for the opportunities He’s given me to use it for His glory."

== Honours ==
In 2021, World Rugby inducted Kolinisau into its World Rugby Hall of Fame, alongside Humphrey Kayange, Huriana Manuel, Cheryl McAfee, Will Carling and Jim Telfer.

Olympic Games
Preceded by Josateki Naulu	Flagbearer for Fiji; 2016 Rio de Janeiro	Succeeded by Jerry Tuwai & Rusila Nagasau
