= Andrew Brown (rugby union, born 10 April 1980) =

Australian rugby union player

Andrew Brown (born 10 April 1980 in Rockhampton, Queensland and Educated at Brisbane Boys College) is an Australian Rugby Union player for the Queensland Reds in the international Super Rugby Competition. Brown is a very versatile player being able to play at Fullback, Flyhalf or in either Centre position but has made all appearances for the Reds at Inside Centre in Super Rugby.

Brown is credited for being a very strong defender being able to withstand the strong attacking style against All Black Legend Tana Umaga and Ma'a Nonu in his debut Super Rugby game. His strong defensive commitment saw him puncture a lung playing against the Hurricanes in round one of the 2007 season.
