= Bill Gadolo =

- Born: Viliame Titoko Gadolo; 1 May 1977 (age 49) Suva, Fiji
- Height: 1.78 m (5 ft 10 in)
- Weight: 106 kg (16 st 10 lb)

Rugby union career
- Position(s): Hooker, Prop
Senior career
Years	Team	Apps	(Points)
1996 - 2007	Suva		
1999 - 2000	Nadroga		
2004 - 2007	Highlanders	20	(5)
2006 - 2007	Fiji Barbarians	9	(0)
2007 - 2008	Frankfurt		
International career
Years	Team	Apps	(Points)
2000 -	Fiji	20	(5)

Viliame Titoko Gadolo (born 1 May 1977 in Suva) is a former Fijian rugby union player. He played as a hooker. As of 2023, he was a performance manager in the Fiji Rugby Football Union.

== Career ==
He played for the Suva side in the Digicel Cup since 1999 although he spent one year with Nadroga. By profession, he is a teacher and he teaches at Yat Sen Secondary School. He was a member of the Fiji U21 team that beat Australia U19s in 1999. He made his Test debut in May 2000 against Japan. Gadolo toured with the Fiji A team to Queensland in June 2002, then played against Tonga the following month when Isaia Rasila and Greg Smith were injured. He also captained the Suva provincial side to the semi-finals of the 2004 Digicel Cup. He plays for Suva Highlanders in the Colonial Cup. He was part of the Fiji team at the 2003 Rugby World Cup and 2007 Rugby World Cup.

He won the German rugby union championship in 2008, when playing for SC 1880 Frankfurt, winning the clubs first national championship since 1925.

In 2023, The Fiji Rugby Football Union Trust Board (FRFUTB) promoted Gadolo to Elite Pathways and Performance Manager. His role is to oversee all pathway, age-group, talent identification and development programs across the women’s and men’s XVs and 7s games.
