= Bill Cavubati =

- Born: July 21, 1970 (age 56) Ba, Fiji
- Height: 1.89 m (6 ft 2 1/2 in)
- Weight: 168 kg (370 lb; 26 st 6 lb)

Rugby union career
Provincial / State sides
Years	Team	Apps	(Points)
1993–98	Wellington		
Super Rugby
Years	Team	Apps	(Points)
1996–98	Hurricanes	19	
International career
Years	Team	Apps	(Points)
1995–2005	Fiji	38	(0)

Bill Cavubati (born 21 July 1970) is a former professional rugby union player. He played for Fiji and his position of choice was tighthead prop. Cavubati's claim to fame is that he is the heaviest player ever to receive the honour of an international cap, weighing in at 167 kilograms (368 lb; 26 st 4 lb) when he appeared for Fiji against New Zealand in 2005.

He played for Wellington in New Zealand throughout the 1990s and his huge size made him a cult hero amongst the fans. "Big Bill" continued to play for a local amateur side and even earned several Fijian caps whilst officially an amateur player.

Bill is now a well known night club bouncer in Wellington, New Zealand. He still plays premier rugby for his club Marist Masterton, in the Wairarapa Bush club rugby competition.
