= Apolosi Satala =

Fiji international rugby union player

- Born: 14 August 1978 (age 48) Lautoka, Fiji
- Height: 6 ft 4 in (1.93 m)
- Weight: 17 st 6 lb (244 lb; 111 kg)
- School: Lelean Memorial School

Rugby union career
- Position(s): Number eight, Flanker, Wing, Centre
Senior career
Years	Team	Apps	(Points)
2005-2006	Edinburgh		
2007–2008	Leeds Carnegie	8	(10)
2008–2010	Gloucester	18	(5)
2010–2012	Sale Sharks		
International career
Years	Team	Apps	(Points)
2005–2010	Fiji	4	(5)
- Correct as of 05 Jan 2008
Medal record
Men's rugby sevens
Representing Fiji
Commonwealth Games
Bronze medal – third place	2006 Melbourne	Team competition

Apolosi Vonowale Satala (born 14 August 1978 in Namoli, Lautoka Fiji) is a Fijian rugby union footballer. He plays as a wing, centre, number eight and Flanker . His nickname is Apo. He is the cousin of Namoli steelman, Viliame Satala. He is married to Olivia and they have two children and is a private in the Army serving with 1st Battalion The Royal Regiment of Scotland. He grew up in the city of Lautoka and he played for Lautoka in the National Provincial Rugby Tournament in Fiji. He has represented Fiji in the Rugby Sevens as well as in fifteens. He plays as a prop/hooker in the sevens code. He is a member of the British Armed Forces and he also played sevens rugby for the army team winning many tournaments.

He represented Fiji in the 2006 Commonwealth Games where Fiji won the bronze medal defeating Australia. He was picked by the Leeds Carnegie rugby club which plays in the National Division One. He played 8 games for them scoring his first try against Saracens in the EDF Energy Cup and scored a further 2 against defending champions, Bath. A member of the winning Army Middlesex Sevens team in both 2001 and 2004, he played for Fiji in the 2005 Rugby World Cup Sevens and returned from Hong Kong with a winners medal and the Melrose Cup. he made his debut for Fiji in the XV's man code in June 2005 against Tonga. he has also played for the Heriot's Rugby Club and the Edinburgh Gunners briefly and Taunton RFC. He now plays for the Gloucester rugby as a replacement for injured flanker and fellow Fijian, Akapusi Qera. He signed a contract with Gloucester until the end of the 2009/2010 season. He has signed to join Sale Sharks for the 2010/2011 season on a 1-year contract.

== Personal life ==
His son Malelili Satala-Navlivou is also a rugby union player.
