= Neil Starling =

English rugby union player

Neil Starling (born 8 June 1982 (age 42) in Kingston upon Thames, England) is a rugby union player currently playing for London Welsh. His previous clubs include Northampton Saints and Rotherham Titans in the Guinness Premiership. He plays as a centre.
