= Tony Roques =

English rugby union player

- Born: 7 September 1978 (age 48) Bromley, London, England
- Occupation: Coach for England Rugby

Rugby union career
- Position: Flanker
- Current team: Cornish All Blacks
Coaching career
- Years: Team
- 2021 GB Rugby 7s Tokyo Olympics

Tony Roques (born 7 September 1978 in Bromley) is a former rugby union player who played at flanker for the Cornish All Blacks, Saracens and the England national rugby sevens team.

Head of Rugby for a year at The Leys School in Cambridge. He then became assistant coach for the England Sevens team until 2018. From 2018 he has been the coach for the USA Rugby Sevens team.

2021 – Coach for the Great Britain Rugby 7s team at the Tokyo Olympics
