= Tiko Matawalu =

Fiji international rugby union player

- Full name: Tikoibau Matawalu
- Born: 23 December 1977 (age 48) Suva, Fiji
- Height: 6 ft 1 in (185 cm)
- Weight: 260 lb (118 kg)
- University: University of the South Pacific
- Notable relative: Akapusi Qera (brother)

Rugby union career
- Position: Prop
International career
Years	Team	Apps	(Points)
2005–07	Fiji	3	(0)

Tikoibau Matawalu (born 23 December 1977) is a Fijian former international rugby union player.

Matawalu was raised in Tubou village, Lakeba, in the Lau Islands. He is a nephew of Flying Fijians lock Ilisoni Taoba, but grew up playing cricket, a sport some of his other uncles played at international level. After representing the Fiji under-21 cricket team as a schoolboy, Matawalu undertook a tour of Australia with the full national side in 1999.

A graduate of University of the South Pacific, Matawalu starting playing competitive rugby during his tertiary studies, competing for Suva club Nabua. He later played with Nadroga after moving to Sigatoka to work at a bank and was capped three times for Fiji. One of his Fiji teammates was his younger brother Akapusi Qera.

Matawalu has served as President of Nadroga Rugby Union and in 2020 was appointed a FRU Development Officer.

== See also ==
- List of Fiji national rugby union players
