= Lesley Jackson =

Lesley Jackson is a curator, historian, and author specialising in twentieth century design. She has published at least eleven books, including Twentieth Century Pattern Design from Princeton Architectural Press, The Sixties: Decade of Design Revolution from Phaidon, The New Look: Design in the Fifties, and Robin and Lucienne Day: Pioneers of Contemporary Design from Mitchell Beazley.

Jackson curated the 'From Atoms to Patterns' exhibition at the Wellcome Collection in 2008.
