= Kevin Croke =

Irish rugby union player

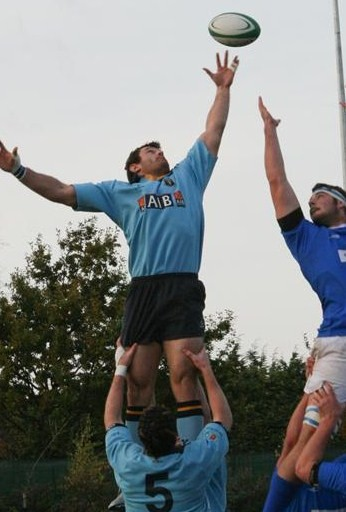
- Born: Kevin Croke; 4 July 1982 (age 44) Dublin, Ireland
- Height: 1.88 m (6 ft 2 in)
- Weight: 101 kg (15 st 13 lb)
- University: University College Dublin

Rugby union career
- Position: Number 8
Amateur team(s)
Years	Team	Apps	(Points)
1995-2001	Newbridge		
2001-2011	UCD		
2011-2013	St Mary's College		
Senior career
Years	Team	Apps	(Points)
- Leinster U19
–	Leinster U21		
International career
Years	Team	Apps	(Points)
- Ireland U19
–	Ireland U21		
–	Irish Universities		
National sevens team
Years	Team		Comps
2005	Ireland		

Kevin Croke (born 4 July 1982) is an Irish rugby union player. He played club rugby for his university UCD and St Mary's College.

Croke has numerous representative honours including caps for Ireland at Under 19's, 21's, 7's, Club International and at Universities level where he captained the 2007 team. At provincial level he has represented Leinster at U-19 and U-21.

He captained UCD for the 2005/06 season in the All-Ireland League Division 1. He also captained the team which retained the colours in 2005 for the university.

Croke is considered a stalwart of university, club and amateur rugby in Ireland. At senior rugby he is a regular on the Irish Club International team, the Irish Universities team where he is often captain and has played in the 7's world cup for Ireland in Hong Kong.

Croke moved to St Mary's College in before the 2011/12 season where he competed in AIL division 1A.
