= Isaac Mow =

- Born: 2 January 1977 (age 49) Korovou, Fiji
- Height: 5 ft 9 in (175 cm)
- Weight: 216 lb (98 kg)
- School: Marist Brothers High School
- Occupation: Chief Executive Officer

Rugby union career
- Position: Centre / Wing
Provincial / State sides
Years	Team	Apps	(Points)
2001	Buller	6	(5)
International career
Years	Team	Apps	(Points)
2002–03	Fiji	5	(10)

Isaac Mow (born 2 January 1977) is a Fijian former international rugby union player.

Born in Korovou, Mow grew up playing rugby using a plastic bottle in his home village and began playing the sport competitively during his time at Marist Brothers High School.

Mow had a season with New Zealand provincial side Buller in 2001 and from 2002 to 2003 gained five international caps for Fiji, playing as a wing three-quarter. He also played rugby in France and later acted as a point of contact for the recruitment of Fijian players, which included Netani Talei and Jale Vatubua.

In 2024, Mow was appointed chief executive officer of Post Fiji.

== See also ==
- List of Fiji national rugby union players
