= Setareki Tawake =

Fiji international rugby union player

- Born: Setareki Tawake Naivaluwaqa; 1 March 1969 (age 57) Kavala, Kadavu Fiji
- Height: 192 cm (6 ft 4 in)
- Weight: 232 lb (105 kg; 16 st 8 lb)

Rugby union career
- Position(s): Openside flanker, Number 8
Provincial / State sides
Years	Team	Apps	(Points)
1994-2004	Suva	40	
International career
Years	Team	Apps	(Points)
1992–2003	Fiji	31	(5)
Medal record
Men's rugby sevens
Representing Fiji
Commonwealth Games
Silver medal – second place	1998 Kuala Lumpur	Team competition

Setareki "Seta" Tawake Naivaluwaqa (born 1 March 1969 in Kavala, Kadavu) is a retired Fijian rugby union player, who was capped for Fiji on 31 occasions. He played as Openside flanker or Number 8. He played in two Rugby World Cups. He was also a soldier

Tawake played both 7's and 15's. He studied at Nasinu Secondary School and he represented them in both 7's and 15's rugby. He made his international debut in 15's against Samoa on 20 June 1992 in Suva.

He represented the Fiji sevens starting in 1996, until helping them to win the 1998 Hong Kong sevens. He was also part of the Fiji team to the 1998 Commonwealth Games where he was part of the silver winning team. He later played represented Suva in the Digicel Cup but missed three seasons while on peacekeeping duties in the Middle East. He also played his rugby in Japan. He missed most of the 2000-01 international seasons to play for his club in Brisbane, where he was based from 1996. He re-joined to the Test side for the RWC qualifiers in June 2002 and went to the 2003 Rugby World Cup but didn't play any game.

== After rugby ==
His memorable experience was when he played five Tests in a row during the 1999 World Cup where he played all his games for the full 80 minutes. He later coached the Akita Northern Bullets
