= Mosese Volavola =

Fijian rugby union player (born 1979)

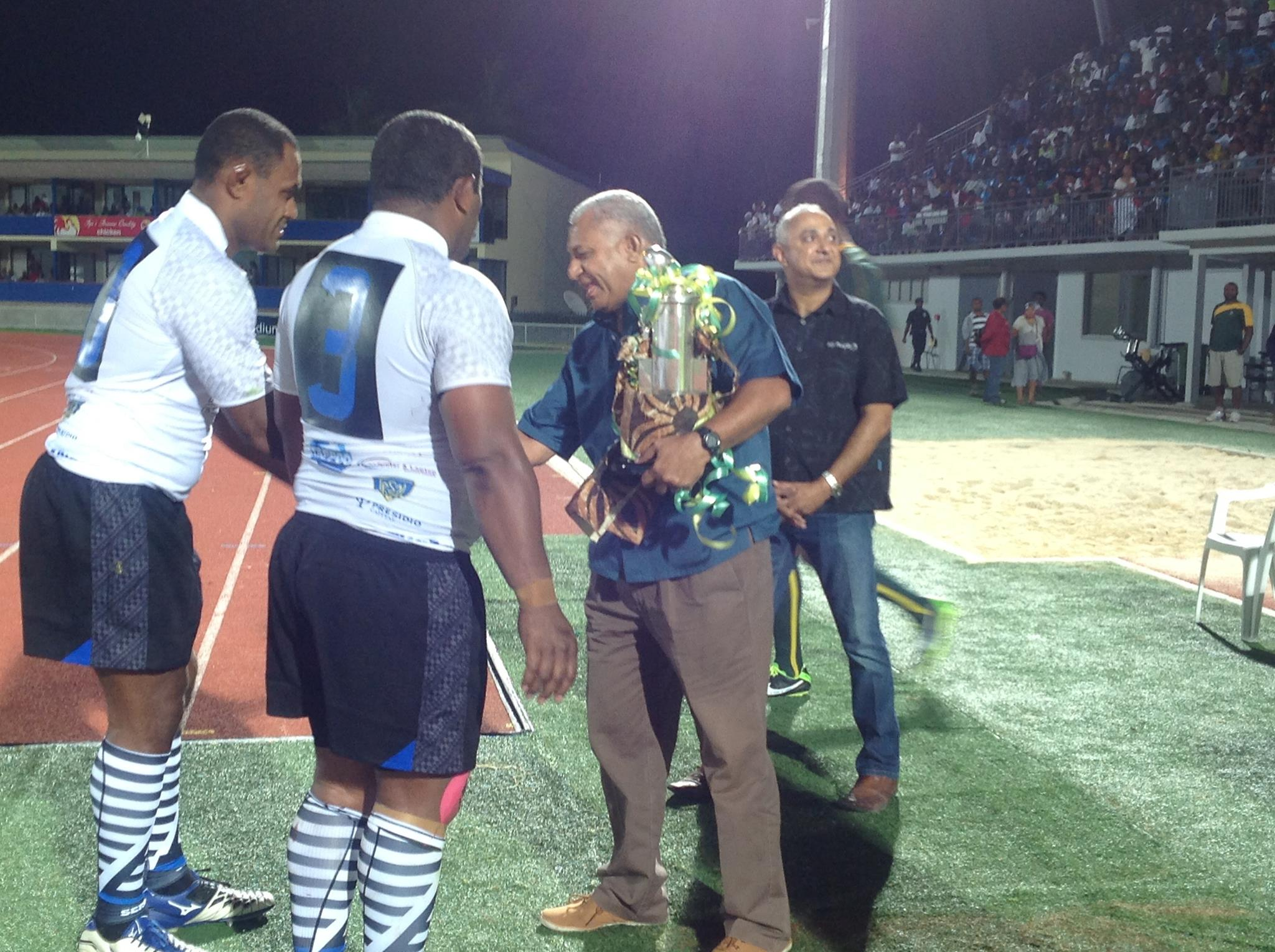
- Fiji PM, Frank Bainimarama awarding the trophy to Nadro captains, Setefano Somoca and Mosese Volavola.
- Born: June 6, 1979 (age 47)
- Height: 1.9 m (6 ft 3 in)
- Weight: 107 kg (236 lb; 16 st 12 lb)

Rugby union career
- Position: Flanker
International career
Years	Team	Apps	(Points)
2005-2010	Fiji	7	
National sevens team
Years	Team		Comps
- Fiji 7s

Mosese Volavola (born 6 June 1979 in Lautoka, Fiji) is a Fijian rugby union footballer. He plays as a Flanker or as a Lock. His nickname is Mo or Moji.

Volavola is 6 feet 3 inches (190 cm) tall and weighs 224 pounds (99 kg). He was born in Lautoka Hospital but now lives in Nadroga. He played for the Ravuka Sharks Club in Nadroga and from there he got picked for the Nadroga team to play in the Digicel Cup competition in 2004. He played for the Coastal Stallions in the Colonial Cup. He had a superb season with Nadroga in 2004 and an outstanding game in the Telecom Fiji Cup final to earn a place in the Fiji team. In the same year he played two test for the Fiji team against the New Zealand Divisional XV's team and even though they lost the first test, they made a comeback in the second test defeating the Divisional XV's team by 61–22. He made his international debut in 2005 against Wales.

He made it into the Fiji sevens team to the IRB World Sevens Series to Dubai and George. He was then handed the captaincy of the Fiji team after former skipper Semisi Naevo was banned for a drinking incident in Japan.

He is currently playing for Nenagh Ormond in Division Three of the All-Ireland League.

== Personal life and career ==
Volavola is a career police officer, He was based at the Lautoka Police Station before migrating to the States in 2020.

=== Fiji Team ===
- Test debut: 2005 v Wales in Cardiff
- 3 caps (5 games)
