= Mosese Luveitasau =

Fijian rugby union footballer (born 1980)

- Born: Mosese Luveitasau Yabakitini; 23 March 1980 (age 46) Suva, Fiji
- Height: 1.78 m (5 ft 10 in)
- Weight: 84 kg (13 st 3 lb)

Rugby union career
- Position: Wing
Senior career
Years	Team	Apps	(Points)
2	Cardiff Blues		
International career
Years	Team	Apps	(Points)
3	Fiji	8	(20)

Mosese Luveitasau Yabakitini (born 23 March 1980 in Suva) is a Fijian rugby union footballer. He is a current Fijian international, and is one of the rising stars of the team. He used to play professional rugby in Wales for Celtic League-side Cardiff Blues leaving after one season. He signed for Cardiff from Fijian Club RFC Rosi in the summer of 2006. He plays as a Winger; he is a prolific hard tackler with very good acceleration despite his small stature.

Mosese or "Moji" as he is known was a Fijian 15's trialist in 2002 and 2003. He was Fiji's top scorer in domestic rugby in 2003 after playing 13 out of 16 games for his province. Despite this, his First Cap came in the Pacific Tri-Nations clash against Samoa in July 2005. Since then he has appeared quite regularly for Fiji.
