= William Apted =

Fijian cricketer (1930–2020)

Personal information
- Full name: William Walsh Apted
- Born: 15 October 1930; Suva, Rewa Province, Fiji
- Died: 2 December 2020 (aged 90)
- Batting: Right-handed
- Bowling: Right-arm off break

International information
- National side: Fiji

Career statistics
Competition	FC
Matches	4
Runs scored	408
Batting average	51.00
100s/50s	1/3
Top score	102
Balls bowled	–
Wickets	–
Bowling average	–
5 wickets in innings	–
10 wickets in match	–
Best bowling	–
Catches/stumpings	–/–
- Source: Cricinfo, 14 March 2010

William Walsh Apted (15 October 1930 – 2 December 2020) was a Fijian cricketer. Apted was a right-handed batsman who bowled right-arm off break.

Apted made his first-class debut for Fiji in 1954 against Otago during Fiji's 1953/54 tour of New Zealand, where on debut he scored his maiden first-class half century with a score of 96. During the tour he played three further first-class matches, with his final first-class match for Fiji coming against Auckland.

In his 4 first-class matches for Fiji he scored 408 runs at a batting average of 51.00, with three half centuries and a single century score of 102 against Canterbury.

Apted also represented Fiji in 21 non first-class matches for Fiji from 1954 to 1960, including in their famous win in 1956 against the touring West Indians. Apted's final match for Fiji came against Newcastle during their 1959/60 tour of Australia.

Apted died on 2 December 2020, at the age of 90.
