= Apisai Naevo =

Fijian politician (died 2008)

Ratu Apisai D. Naevo (died 2008) was a Fijian Chief and political leader. As Tui Nawaka, he was the paramount chief of the vanua of Nawaka, Nadi. He had two sons, Apenisa Naevo and Semisi Naevo, both of whom played rugby for Fiji. A retired school teacher, he was a member of the Ba Provincial Council and various boards. He was also deputy chairman of the Fiji Pine Limited Board during its tumultuous years after George Speight was removed as chairman by the then Minister for Agriculture, Poseci Bune, in 1999.

From 2001 to 2006, he represented the Province of Ba in the Senate as one of fourteen nominees of the Great Council of Chiefs. Naevo died in June 2008.
