= Joseph Narruhn =

- Born: 23 December 1974 (age 51)
- Height: 5 ft 9 in (175 cm)
- Weight: 196 lb (89 kg)

Rugby union career
- Position: Utility back
International career
Years	Team	Apps	(Points)
2002	Fiji	8	(39)

Joseph Narruhn (born 23 December 1974) is a Fijian former international rugby union player.

Narruhn, a Japan-based player with Hino Red Dolphins, was a member of the national team in 2002 as an understudy to flyhalf Nicky Little and gained eight caps. He earned his first four caps off the bench, which included a match against the All Blacks, then broke into the starting XV to replace the suspended Little in a win over Tonga in Nadi, where he contributed 17 points. On Fiji's subsequent tour of the British Isles, Narruhn was the fullback against Wales at Millennium Stadium and kicked four penalties as flyhalf in their narrow loss to Scotland at Murrayfield.

== See also ==
- List of Fiji national rugby union players
