= Nasoni Roko =

Fijian rugby union player (born 1979)

Nasoni Rokobiau
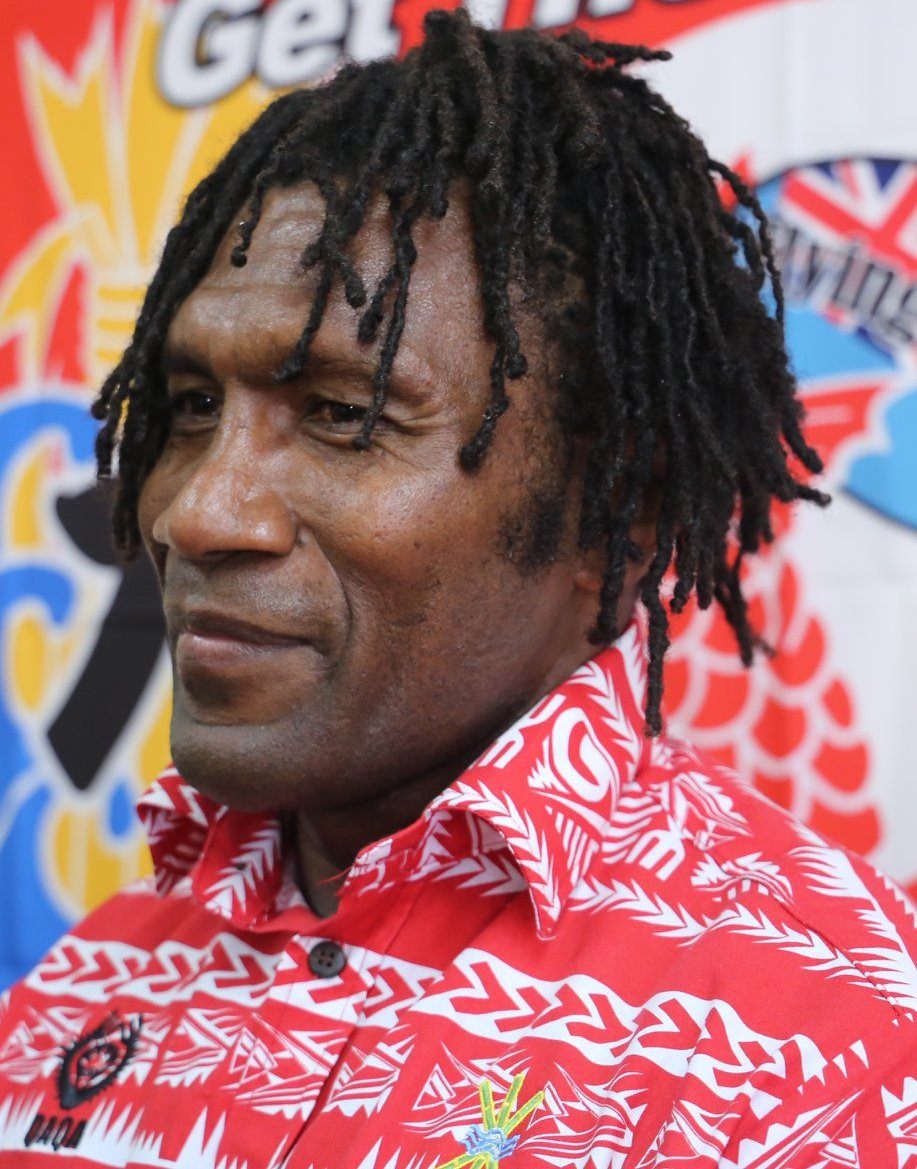
- Nasoni Roko is one of the most high scoring players with a record of 125
- Born: 29 November 1979 (age 46) Vunidawa, Fiji
- Height: 1.78 m (5 ft 10 in)
- Weight: 90 kg (14 st 2 lb)
- School: Naitasiri Secondary

Rugby union career
- Position(s): Wing, fullback, centre
Amateur team(s)
Years	Team	Apps	(Points)
- Waimanu, Naitasiri
- Correct as of 2007-01-24
Provincial / State sides
Years	Team	Apps	(Points)
2004	Hawke's Bay	8	(40)
- Correct as of 2007-01-24
International career
Years	Team	Apps	(Points)
2002 -	Fiji sevens team		(815)
–	Fiji 'A'		
- Correct as of 2010-12-01

Nasoni Rokobiau, born 29 November 1979, in Vunidawa, Fiji is a rugby union player. Rokobiau has represented Fiji in their rugby sevens team, as well as Fiji in the 15 man form of the game.

He has played for the Fiji national rugby sevens team since 2002, representing his country in many International Rugby Board sevens tournaments. Roko played for Fiji when they won the 2005 Rugby World Cup Sevens. He was included in the squad for the Wellington leg of the 2007 World Sevens Series. He will make a return for the national sevens team to Dubai and George in December 2014. Roko has scored over 100 tries for Fiji in rugby sevens.

He plays in the Colonial Cup for the Suva Highlanders, and has also played in Malaysia, and in New Zealand (for Hawke's Bay in 2004). His performance in the Digicel Cup saw him get selected in the Fiji 15's team to the 2009 Autumn Internationals where he played in the match against Ireland.
