= Vilimoni Delasau =

Fijian former rugby union footballer

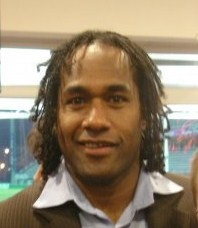
- Born: Vilimoni Waqatabu Delasau; 12 July 1977 (age 49) Sorokaba, Ba, Fiji
- Height: 190 cm (6 ft 3 in)
- Weight: 99 kg (15 st 8 lb; 218 lb)

Rugby union career
- Position(s): Wing, inside centre
Senior career
Years	Team	Apps	(Points)
1998–1999	Lautoka		
2000–2002	Montois		
2002–2003	Yamaha		
2004–2006	Canterbury	7	(5)
2006–2008	Clermont	26	(70)
2008–2010	Montauban	40	(80)
2010–2012	Toulouse	23	(20)
Super Rugby
Years	Team	Apps	(Points)
2005	Crusaders	4	(0)
2006	Highlanders	8	(10)
International career
Years	Team	Apps	(Points)
2000-08	Fiji	29	(55)
2008	Pacific Islanders	3	(10)
- Correct as of 21 November 2011
National sevens team
Years	Team		Comps
1998–2005	Fiji		17
Medal record
Men's rugby sevens
Representing Fiji
Commonwealth Games
Silver medal – second place	2002 Manchester	Team competition

Vilimoni Waqatabu Delasau (born 12 July 1977 in Sorokaba, Ba) is a Fijian former rugby union footballer. He played as a wing. His nickname is Delz.

== Early career ==
He grew up in the Town of Ba and he played for Lautoka in the National Provincial Rugby Tournament in Fiji. He was picked to represent Fiji in the Rugby Sevens. He scored 85 tries for the Fiji sevens. In 1999 Delasau was named Player of the Year at the Fiji Rugby Awards after scoring 82 tries in the season. He earned his first Test cap against the US Eagles in June 2000 after impressing in the sevens form of the game the previous year. He also holds the record for scoring the most tries in a sevens game with 6 tries.

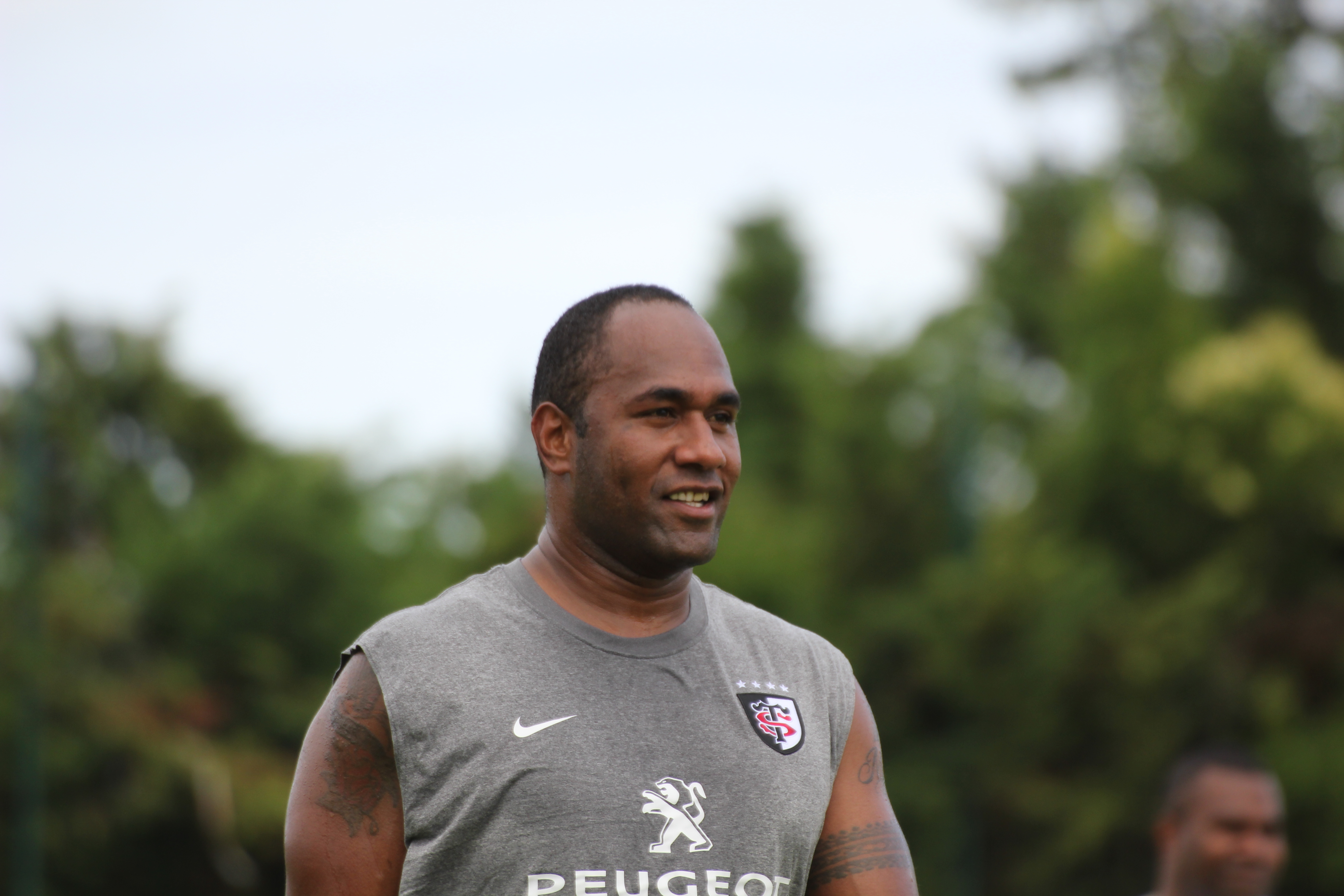
Delasau training with Toulouse

== Europe ==
He then went to Japan and played there for two years before going to France and playing for the Mont-de-Marsan rugby club where he played 5 games for them scoring 3 tries. After that he returned to Fiji and was chosen to represent the Canterbury in the NPC. He later represented the Crusaders in the Super 12 competition and in late 2005, he represented the Highlanders in the Super 14 competition. After his short stint, he moved to France to join ASM Clermont Auvergne where he represented them in the Top 14 and in the ECC competition. He scored a few good tries for clermont including a 90-metre run against London Wasps in the 2007–08 Heineken Cup which was awarded the try of the season. He joined his new club, US Montauban after his contract with Clermont expired and he chose not to renew it.

He represented Fiji in the 2003 and 2007 Rugby World Cup. In the 2007 World Cup he scored one of the tries as Fiji defeated Wales to reach their first quarter final in 20 years, and he also scored a try in the quarter-final defeat to South Africa. He was also part of the Fiji sevens at the 2001, 2005 and 2009 Rugby World Cup Sevens.

== Later career ==
In April 2010 he joined Toulouse as a medical joker as they suffered numerous injuries. Montauban suffered a points deduction for financial irregularities and will be relegated at the end of the 2009/2010 season. He scored his first try against Castres on just his second game for his new team.

In February 2012, he retired from International rugby.
