= Isaia Rasila =

Fijian rugby union player (1969–2010)

- Born: Isaia Rasila; April 29, 1969 Vunavutu, Fiji
- Died: October 9, 2010 (aged 41) Rakirakilevu, Fiji
- Height: 1.86 m (6 ft 1 in)
- Weight: 242 lb (110 kg; 17.3 st)

Rugby union career
- Position: hooker
Senior career
Years	Team	Apps	(Points)
- Gaunavou
Provincial / State sides
Years	Team	Apps	(Points)
- Nadroga
International career
Years	Team	Apps	(Points)
1992–2003	Fiji	34	(10)

Isaia Rasila (29 April 1969 – 9 October 2010) was a Fijian rugby union player, who was capped for Fiji on 34 occasions, five as team captain. He played in two Rugby World Cups.
