= Jone Daunivucu =

Fijian rugby union player (born 1977)

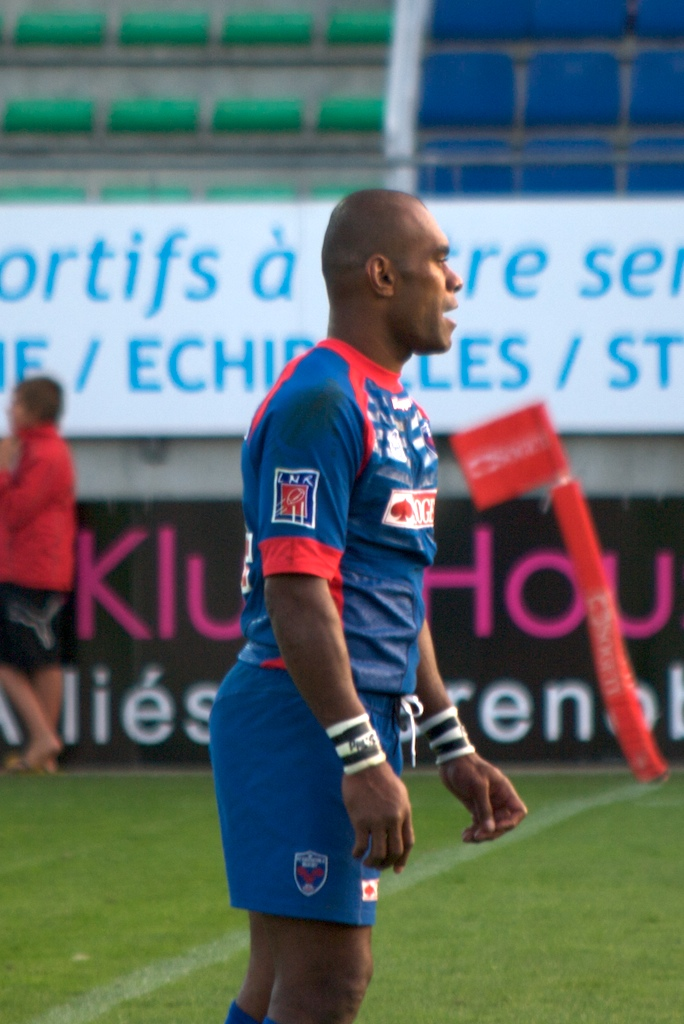
- Born: 1 June 1977 (age 49) Lautoka, Fiji
- Height: 1.80 m (5 ft 11 in)
- Weight: 84 kg (13 st 3 lb; 185 lb)

Rugby union career
- Position(s): Scrum-half, Wing
Senior career
| Years | Team | Apps | (Points) |
| 1990–1996 | Vuaki | | |
| 1997–1998 | Mana | | |
| 1999–2000 | Vio | | |
| 2001–2002 | Nacula | | |
| 2006 – 2006 | Nadroga | | |
| 2006 – 2006 | Fiji Warriors | 26 | (25) |
| 2006–2007 | Tarbes | 69 | (80) |
| 2007 - | Grenoble | | |
International career
| Years | Team | Apps | (Points) |
| 2007 | Fiji | 4 | (0) |
National sevens team
| Years | Team | | Comps |
| 2002–2006 | Fiji | | 17 |
Medal record
Men's rugby sevens
Representing Fiji
Commonwealth Games
| Bronze medal – third place | 2006 Melbourne | Team competition |

Jone Daunivucu (born 1 June 1977 in Lautoka) is a Fijian rugby union player.

== Career ==
He is a former captain of the Fiji national sevens team. His knowledge of the game and discipline on-field allowed coach Waisale Serevi to give him the captaincy for the 2005-06 IRB World series. During his captaincy he led Fiji to victory in the 2005 Sevens Rugby World Cup and the 2005/06 World Sevens Series.

He is a utility back and plays at his usual scrum-half position and can play as a centre or on the wing. He plays for Grenoble in the French Pro D2
