= Nawaka Rugby Club =

Fijian rugby union club, based in Nadi

Nawaka Rugby Club is a rugby club from the town of Nadi, Fiji.

The Nawaka Club has played at major European Sevens tournaments including those at Lisbon, Cascais, and Madrid. They won the Melrose Sevens in 2000.

== See also ==
- Rugby Union in Fiji
- Fiji Rugby Union
- Fiji national rugby union team
- Fiji national rugby sevens team
- Colonial Cup
