= Neumi Nanuku =

Fijian rugby union footballer (born 1976)

- Born: 20 June 1976 (age 50) Burenitu, Nalawa, Fiji
- Height: 1.75 m (5 ft 9 in)
- Weight: 83 kg (183 lb)

Rugby union career
- Position: Fullback
International career
Years	Team	Apps	(Points)
2005	Fiji	1	
Medal record
Men's rugby sevens
Representing Fiji
Commonwealth Games
Bronze medal – third place	2006 Melbourne	Team competition

Neumi Nanuku (born 20 June 1976) is a Fijian rugby union footballer, je plays as a fullback.

Nanuku is 5 feet 9 (175 cm) tall and weighs 83 kilograms (183 lb). He grew up in the Nalawa and he played for Nadroga in the National Provincial Rugby Tournament in Fiji.

== Fiji Sevens ==
A member of the 2005 World Cup 7s winning squad, Nanuku stamped his mark as one of the predators of the 2005-06 IRB Sevens World Series.

After coming on in the Wellington Sevens final against South Africa, Nanuku sprinted the length of the pitch to score the winning try in extra-time.

One of Nadroga's heroes of 2004 after the resounding victories in the Telecom Fiji Cup and Sullivan-Farebrother Trophy. Overlooked for the 2004 Colonial Cup, Nanuku still finished the season as top try scorer in Fiji with 12.

Nanuku debuted for Fiji alongside Nadroga team-mates Mosese Volavola, Dale Tonawai and Isoa Neivua, and although his first game against the NZ Divisional XV was less than perfect, he made an improved performance a week later in Lautoka to restore some confidence.

He was then selected into the Fiji sevens team for Dubai and South Africa and later short-listed for IRB Sevens Player of the Year.

He would miss the next two Leg of the series due to an injury. Nanuku had a knee operation and this will keep him out of playing at the two tournaments.

== Europe ==
Nanuku signed to play in the Top 14 rugby competition for the Castres for the 2007-08 Top 14 season for one season and the following year, he signed on for Dax rugby team.

== Fiji tests ==
- Test debut: 2005 v Portugal in Lisbon
- 1 cap (5 games)
