= Apenisa Naevo =

Fiji international rugby union player

Apisai Naevo
- Born: 24 February 1973 (age 53)
- Height: 1.97 m (6 ft 6 in)
- Weight: 105 kg (16 st 7 lb)
- Notable relative(s): Semisi Naevo; Manoa Naevo

Rugby union career
- Position(s): Lock, Flanker
Senior career
Years	Team	Apps	(Points)
- Counties
–	Kaneka		
Super Rugby
Years	Team	Apps	(Points)
1998	Blues	5	(0)
1999	Chiefs	5	(0)
International career
Years	Team	Apps	(Points)
1996 - 2006	Fiji	34	(30)

Ratu Apenisa Naevo (born 24 February 1973) is a Fijian rugby union footballer. His usual position is at lock. He has earned over 30 caps for the national team, after debuting in 1996 and going on to represent them at the Rugby World Cup.

Naveo made his debut for Fiji on September 29, 1996, in a match against Hong Kong. Not only did his career get off to a winning start, with Fiji taking the match 64–11, he scored a try on debut. He played two other games that year, another against Hong Kong, and the other against the NZ Maori.

After being capped three times the following season he went on to appear five times for Fiji in 1998. In 1999 he played three games during June–July, and then four Tests during August and was then included in the Fiji squad for the 1999 Rugby World Cup in Wales. He played two matches during the tournament; the games against Namibia and Canada during the pool stages.

He next played for Fiji in May 2001, and went on to play another five times that season. He went on tour in November of the 2002 season, playing in the games against Wales, Ireland and Scotland. After playing two games in July 2003 he was included in the Fiji squad for the 2003 Rugby World Cup in Australia, playing three games, against France and the United States, scoring tries in both, and the games against Scotland.

Apenisa Naevo is the son of Joeli Lesavua, the younger brother of Ratu Apisai Naevo, the Paramount Chief of Nawaka, in Nadi. His brother, Semisi Naevo, is also a rugby player.

== Fiji Team ==
- Test debut: 1996 vs Hong Kong in Aberdeen
- 35 caps 6 tries 30 points (49 games, 11 tries, 55 points)
