= Lepani Nabuliwaqa =

Fijian rugby union player (born 1980)

- Born: 4 June 1980 (age 46) Suva, Fiji
- Height: 5 ft 9 in (1.75 m)
- Weight: 84 kg (13 st 3 lb; 185 lb)

Rugby union career
- Position: Wing
International career
| Years | Team | Apps | (Points) |
| 2006–present | Fiji 7s | 4 | |
Medal record
Men's rugby sevens
Representing Fiji
Commonwealth Games
| Bronze medal – third place | 2006 Melbourne | Team competition |

Lepani Nabuliwaqa (born 4 June 1980), nicknamed Leps, is a Fijian rugby union footballer. He plays as a wing.

== Career ==
Nabuliwaqa was an influential member of the Red Rock sevens team which participated in Fiji domestic sevens competition in 2003–04 season. He made his debut for the Fiji sevens team when he replaced Vima Tuidraki at the 2006 USA Sevens. He copped a six-week ban for a dangerous tackle but still he made the 12-man squad for the Commonwealth Games in Melbourne. He took over as the playmaker in the 2005/06 IRB Sevens World Series and became one of Fiji's star performers. He was later given the Digicel Fiji sevens best player award ahead of Sireli Naqelevuki and Dale Tonawai at the Fiji Rugby Union annual awards. Nabuliwaqa played 15s and 7s for Nakasi, and was recruited by Lote Rasiga into the Red Rock team at the Nataleira 7s tournament joining the likes of Sireli Bobo, Manasa Bola, Neumi Cakacaka and Aporosa Dauvucu.

For the 2012 and 2013 season, he played 15s for The South Darwin Rabbitohs, and made Sevens appearances for the Country King Browns. Leps has been named in the Squad for the King Browns in the 2014 Hottest Sevens In Darwin, Australia.
