= Fiji national rugby sevens team =

Fiji
- Union: Fiji Rugby Union
- Coach: Osea Kolinisau
- Captain: Jeremaia Matana
- Top scorer: Waisale Serevi (1310)
- Most tries: Waisea Nacuqu (135)
Team kit	Change kit

World Cup Sevens
- Appearances: 8 (First in 1993)
- Best result: Champions (1997, 2005, 2022); World Rugby series (2005–2006, 2014–2015, 2015–2016, 2018–2019)

Fiji national rugby sevens team
Medal record

Olympic Games
Gold medal – first place	2016 Rio de Janeiro	Team
Gold medal – first place	2020 Tokyo	Team
Silver medal – second place	2024 Paris	Team

Rugby Sevens World Cup
Gold medal – first place	1997 British Hong Kong	Team
Gold medal – first place	2005 Hong Kong	Team
Gold medal – first place	2022 Cape Town	Team
Bronze medal – third place	1993 Edinburgh	Team
Bronze medal – third place	2001 Mar del Plata	Team
Bronze medal – third place	2013 Moscow	Team

World Games
Gold medal – first place	2001 Akita	Team
Gold medal – first place	2005 Duisburg	Team
Gold medal – first place	2009 Kaohsiung	Team

Oceania Sevens Championship
Gold medal – first place	2014 Noosa	Team
Gold medal – first place	2016 Suva	Team
Gold medal – first place	2017 Suva	Team
Gold medal – first place	2018 Suva	Team
Gold medal – first place	2021 Townsville	Team
Silver medal – second place	2011 Apia	Team
Silver medal – second place	2013 Suva	Team
Silver medal – second place	2019 Suva	Team

Pacific Games
Gold medal – first place	1999 Santa Rita	Team
Gold medal – first place	2003 Suva	Team
Gold medal – first place	2007 Apia	Team
Gold medal – first place	2015 Port Moresby	Team
Gold medal – first place	2019 Apia	Team
Silver medal – second place	2011 Noumea	Team

The Fiji national rugby sevens team has competed in the World Rugby Sevens Series, Rugby World Cup Sevens and the Olympics. Fiji won the gold medal in the inaugural rugby sevens at the Summer Olympics in 2016 in Brazil, the country's first Olympic medal in any event, and repeated as Olympic champions in the 2020 Summer Olympics in Tokyo, defeating New Zealand. Fiji would fall short from winning gold for a third straight time in 2024 after a defeat in the final to hosts France. Overall, Fiji are the only national rugby sevens team in the world to have won the Sevens Treble (the Olympics, Sevens Series, and World Cup), the three major achievements in Sevens. They have won multiple World Rugby Sevens Series and Rugby World Cup Sevens.

Fiji Sevens is watched and enjoyed by fans around the world for its style of play — the "Flying Fijians" play with Fijian flair. Their passing and offloads can be unorthodox for traditional rugby coaching, and more similar to basketball style.

== History ==
The International Rugby Board (IRB) expanded the sevens rugby competition to become a series of 11 tournaments around the world. The debt the FRU incurred from the 2000 sevens series was significant. At the end of December 2000, the FRU was burdened with accumulated losses of F$933,306. Fiji appealed to the IRB for funding, arguing that the sevens tournament was built around Fiji and they would not be able to participate without such funding. From that appeal flowed participation funds that enabled the islands teams to play in the World Sevens Series fully funded. By the end of November 2001, the FRU was sitting on a surplus of F$560,311 compared with the previous year's net loss of F$675,609.

The FRU again ran out of money in 2013 to support the national sevens team. The IRB had temporarily suspended funding due to concerns with FRU financial management and governance. The head coach went unpaid for months, another staff was terminated, and the team lacked funds for basic supplies such as rugby balls and bottled water.

Waisale Serevi is highly regarded as the best player ever in sevens rugby. Nicknamed the "maestro", played in this side from 1989 to 2006 leading them to countless tournament victories, two Sevens World Cups in 1997 and 2005.

== World Rugby Sevens Series ==
Summary
Rank	Times	Seasons
1st	4	2005–06, 2014–15, 2015–16, 2018–2019
2nd	6	1999–2000, 2004–05, 2006–07, 2008–09, 2011–12, 2017–18, 2024–25
3rd	9	2000–01, 2002–03, 2012–13, 2013–14, 2016–17, 2019–20, 2021–22, 2022–23, 2023–24
4th	5	2001–02, 2003–04, 2007–08, 2009–10, 2010–11
6th	1	2023-24
Total	25	

Fiji has won the World Rugby Sevens Series four times — first in 2005–06, and most recently in 2018–19.

Sevens Series record
Year	Position	Rounds	Points	Most tries	Most points
1999–00	2nd	10	180	Vilimoni Delasau (83)	
2000–01	3rd	9	124		
2001–02	4th	11	122		
2002–03	3rd	7	94		
2003–04	4th	8	84		
2004–05	2nd	7	88		
2005–06	1st	8	144		
2006–07	2nd	8	128		William Ryder (416)
2007–08	4th	8	98	Emosi Vucago (25)	Neumi Nanuku (146)
2008–09	2nd	8	102	Vereniki Goneva (24)	
2009–10	4th	8	108		William Ryder (166)
2010–11	4th	8	122	Seremaia Burotu (29)	Emosi Vucago (195)
2011–12	2nd	9	161	Joeli Lutumailagi (28)	Metuisela Talebula (271)
2012–13	3rd	9	121	Samisoni Viriviri (29)	Joji Baleviani Raqamate (247)
2013–14	3rd	9	144	Samisoni Viriviri (52)	Samisoni Viriviri (260)
2014–15	1st	9	164	Savenaca Rawaca (42)	Osea Kolinisau (312)
2015–16	1st	10	181	Savenaca Rawaca (35)	Vatemo Ravouvou (287)
2016–17	3rd	10	150		
2017–18	2nd	10	180	Eroni Sau (37)	Amenoni Nasilasila (316)
2018–19	1st	10	186	Aminiasi Tuimaba (46)	
2019–20	3rd	6	83	Aminiasi Tuimaba (20)	Napolioni Bolaca (159)
2021	Did Not Participate				
2021–22	3rd	9	122	Viwa Naduvalo (28)	Waisea Nacuqu (230)
2022–23	3rd	11	156		Waisea Nacuqu (317)
2023–24	6th	7	80		
2024–25	2nd	6	96	Joji Nasova (26)	Joji Nasova (158)
Total	4 Titles	209	3039	Nasoni Roko (125)	Waisale Serevi (1,310)

== Quadrennial tournaments ==
=== Summer Olympics ===
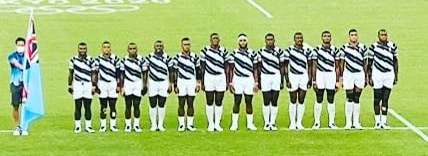
Fiji teams at the 2020 Summer Olympics

Olympic Games record
Year	Round	Pos	Pld	W	L	D	Most tries	Qualifying
(Brazil) 2016	Gold Medal Match	1st	6	6	0	0	Josua Tuisova (5)	Finished first at the 2014–15 World Series
(Japan) 2020	Gold Medal Match	1st	6	6	0	0	Jiuta Wainiqolo (5)	Finished first at the 2018–19 World Series
(France) 2024	Gold Medal Match	2nd	6	5	1	0	Joji Nasova (4)	Finished third at the 2022–23 World Series
Total	2 Titles	3/3	18	17	1	0		

Olympic Games History
2016	Pool stage	Fiji 40 – 12 Brazil	Win
2016	Pool stage	Fiji 21 – 14 Argentina	Win
2016	Pool stage	Fiji 24 – 19 United States	Win
2016	Quarterfinals	Fiji 12 – 7 New Zealand	Win
2016	Semifinals	Fiji 20 – 5 Japan	Win
2016	Gold Medal Match	Fiji 43 – 7 Great Britain	Win
2020	Pool stage	Fiji 24 – 19 Japan	Win
2020	Pool stage	Fiji 28 – 14 Canada	Win
2020	Pool stage	Fiji 33 – 7 Great Britain	Win
2020	Quarterfinals	Fiji 19 – 0 Australia	Win
2020	Semifinals	Fiji 26 – 14 Argentina	Win
2020	Gold Medal Match	Fiji 27 – 12 New Zealand	Win
2024	Pool stage	Fiji 40 – 12 Uruguay	Win
2024	Pool stage	Fiji 38 – 12 United States	Win
2024	Pool stage	Fiji 19 – 12 France	Win
2024	Quarterfinals	Fiji 19 – 15 Ireland	Win
2024	Semifinals	Fiji 31 – 7 Australia	Win
2024	Gold Medal Match	Fiji 7 – 28 France	Loss

=== Rugby World Cup Sevens ===
World Cup Sevens record
Year	Round	Position	Played	Won	Lost	Drew	Most tries	Most points
(Scotland) 1993	Semi-finals	3rd	9	7	2	0		
(Hong Kong) 1997	Finals	1st	7	7	0	0	M. Vunibaka (12)	W. Serevi (117)
(Argentina) 2001	Semi-finals	3rd	7	6	1	0		
(Hong Kong) 2005	Finals	1st	8	8	0	0		
(United Arab Emirates) 2009	Quarter-finals	5th	4	3	1	0		
(Russia) 2013	Semi-finals	3rd	6	4	2	0		
(United States) 2018	Semi-finals	4th	4	2	2	0		
(South Africa) 2022	Finals	1st	4	4	0	0		
Total	3 Titles	8/8	49	41	8	0	M. Vunibaka (23)	W. Serevi (297)

=== Commonwealth Games ===
Commonwealth Games record
Year	Round	Position	Pld	W	L	D
(Malaysia) 1998	Gold Medal Match	2nd	7	6	1	0
(England) 2002	Gold Medal Match	2nd	6	4	2	0
(Australia) 2006	Bronze Medal Match	3rd	6	5	1	0
(India) 2010	Suspended					
(Scotland) 2014	Ineligible					
(Australia) 2018	Gold Medal Match	2nd	5	4	1	0
(England) 2022	Gold Medal Match	2nd	6	5	0	0
Total	0 Titles	5/5	30	24	5	0

Commonwealth Games history
1998	1st Phase	Fiji 54 – 7 Wales	Win
1998	1st Phase	Fiji 71 – 0 Swaziland	Win
1998	2nd Phase	Fiji 63 – 5 Malaysia	Win
1998	2nd Phase	Fiji 71 – 0 Kenya	Win
1998	Quarter-finals	Fiji 26 – 19 Canada	Win
1998	Semi-finals	Fiji 28 – 14 Australia	Win
1998	Gold Medal Match	Fiji 12 – 21 New Zealand	Loss
2002	Pool stage	Fiji 75 – 0 Trinidad and Tobago	Win
2002	Pool stage	Fiji 73 – 0 Malaysia	Win
2002	Pool stage	Fiji 12 – 19 Australia	Loss
2002	Quarter-finals	Fiji 7 – 5 England	Win
2002	Semi-finals	Fiji 17 – 7 South Africa	Win
2002	Gold Medal Match	Fiji 15 – 33 New Zealand	Loss
2006	Pool stage	Fiji 31 – 14 Canada	Win
2006	Pool stage	Fiji 63 – 0 Niue	Win
2006	Pool stage	Fiji 33 – 7 Scotland	Win
2006	Quarter-finals	Fiji 26 – 7 Wales	Win
2006	Semi-finals	Fiji 14 – 21 England	Loss
2006	Bronze Medal Match	Fiji 24 – 17 Australia	Win
2010	Suspended		
2014	Boycott		
2018	Pool stage	Fiji 63 – 5 Sri Lanka	Win
2018	Pool stage	Fiji 54 – 0 Uganda	Win
2018	Pool stage	Fiji 21 – 17 Wales	Win
2018	Semi-Finals	Fiji 24 – 19 South Africa	Win
2018	Gold Medal Match	Fiji 0 – 14 New Zealand	Loss
2022	Pool Stage	Fiji 52 – 0 Zambia	Win
2022	Pool Stage	Fiji 19 – 12 Canada	Win
2022	Pool Stage	Fiji 38 – 24 Wales	Win
2022	Quarter-finals	Fiji 34 – 7 Scotland	Win
2022	Semi-Finals	Fiji 19 (a.e.t.) – 14 New Zealand	Win
2022	Gold Medal Match	Fiji 7 – 31 South Africa	Loss

== Tournament Victories ==
- World Sevens Series Winners (2005–06, 2014–15, 2015–16, 2018–19)
- Summer Olympics Gold (2016, 2020)
- Rugby World Cup Sevens Champions (1997, 2005,2022)
- Commonwealth Games: Silver (1998, 2002, 2018,2022); Bronze (2006)
- Hong Kong Sevens Winners (1977, 1978, 1980, 1981, 1984, 1990, 1991, 1992, 1997, 1998, 1999, 2005, 2009, 2012, 2013, 2015, 2016, 2017, 2018, 2019)
- World Games Gold (2001, 2005, 2009)
- Pacific Games Gold (1995, 1999, 2003, 2007, 2015, 2019)
- Darwin Hottest Sevens Winner (2005, 2006, 2007, 2008)
- Oceania Sevens Winners (2014, 2016, 2017, 2018, 2021)
- Gala Sevens Winner (1991)
- Australia Sevens Winners (2000, 2007, 2011, 2012, 2014, 2020)
- USA Sevens Winners (2007, 2015, 2016)
- Singapore Sevens Winners (2006, 2018)
- Scotland Sevens Winners (2009, 2015)
- Mar de Plata Winners (2000, 2002)
- New Zealand Sevens Winners (2000, 2006, 2010, 2018, 2019)
- South Africa Sevens Winners (1999, 2002, 2005, 2018)
- London Sevens Winners (2006, 2012, 2018, 2019)
- Dubai Sevens Winners (2013, 2015)
- Japan Sevens Winners (1995–97, 2000, 2014)

== Players ==
=== Current squad ===
The following players have been selected to represent Fiji during the 2023–24 SVNS tournament beginning in December 2023.

Note: Caps reflect the total number of SVNS events competed in as of the 2023 Dubai Sevens.

Player	Position	Date of birth (age)	Caps	Club/province
Jerry Matana	Forward	14 July 1998 (age 28)	14	Unattached
Sevuloni Mocenacagi	Forward	29 June 1990 (age 36)	48	Rouen
Kaminieli Rasaku	Forward	12 July 1999 (age 27)	10	Bayonne
Filipe Sauturaga	Forward	19 June 1994 (age 32)	12	Unattached
Joseva Talacolo (c)	Forward	1 April 1997 (age 29)	13	Unattached
Ilikimi Vunaki	Forward	2001 (age 24–25)	1	Unattached
Pilipo Bukayaro	Back	18 March 1999 (age 27)	15	Unattached
Josese Batirerega	Back	28 November 1999 (age 26)	9	Unattached
Rubeni Kabu	Back	1997 (age 28–29)	1	Unattached
Netava Koroisau	Back	1996 (age 29–30)	1	Unattached
Manueli Maisamoa	Back	9 August 1995 (age 31)	17	Unattached
Vuiviawa Naduvalo	Back	25 May 1996 (age 30)	15	Unattached
Kavekini Tabu	Back	21 June 1994 (age 32)	7	Bressane
Terio Tamani	Back	6 July 1994 (age 32)	13	Unattached

== Records and statistics ==
=== Player records ===
The following section lists player records from the World Rugby Sevens Series. Players in bold are still active.

Most tries
No.	Player	Tries
1	Jerry Tuwai	140
2	Waisea Nacuqu	131
3	Nasoni Rokobiau	125
4	Osea Kolinisau	122
5	Samisoni Viriviri	120

Most points
No.	Player	Points
1	Waisale Serevi	1,310
2	Osea Kolinisau	1,272
3	William Ryder	987
4	Vatemo Ravouvou	981
5	Nasoni Roko	857

=== Award winners ===
The following Fiji Sevens players have been recognised at the World Rugby Awards since 2004:

World Rugby Men's 7s Player of the Year (2004–17)
Year	Nominees	Winners
2005	Neumi Nanuku	—
2014	Samisoni Viriviri	**Samisoni Viriviri**
2015	Semi Kunatani	—
2016	Osea Kolinisau	—
2017	Jerry Tuwai	—

World Rugby Men's 7s Player of the Year (2018–25)
Year	Nominees	Winners
2018	Jerry Tuwai (2)	
2019	Jerry Tuwai (3)	**Jerry Tuwai**
2021	Napolioni Bolaca	—
2021	Jiuta Wainiqolo	—
2022	Kaminieli Rasaku	—

World Rugby Coach of the Year
Year	Nominees	Winners
2016	Ben Ryan	—

World Rugby Men's 7s Dream Team
Year	No.	Player
2024	6.	Ponepati Loganimasi
2025	5.	Joji Nasova

=== Former players ===
In addition to the players listed above, other notable players include:

- Waisale Serevi
- William Ryder
- Jerry Tuwai
- Osea Kolinisau
- Semi Kunatani
- Rupeni Caucaunibuca
- Samisoni Viriviri
- Semi Radradra
- Levani Botia
- Manasa Bari
- Sireli Bobo
- Vilimoni Delasau
- Temesia Kaumaia
- Ifereimi Naruma
- Norman Ligairi
- Timoci Matanavou
- Lepani Nabuliwaqa
- Vereniki Goneva
- Setareki Tawake
- Aisea Tuilevu
- Seru Rabeni
- Kameli Ratuvou
- Ifereimi Rawaqa
- Viliame Satala
- Jope Tuikabe
- Mosese Volavola
- Apolosi Satala
- Semisi Naevo
- Watekini Vunisa

== Head coaches ==
Coach	Tenure	Note
Gareth Baber	2016–21	Baber has won the most tournaments by a Fiji 7s coach and has coached the side to their 4th World Series Title in 2019. In addition, Baber also coached the Fiji 7s side to victory by bringing the country's second gold medal at the 2020 Tokyo Olympics.
Ben Ryan	2013–16	Ryan coached the Fiji 7s side to 2 back-to-back world series titles and the country's first gold medal at the 2016 Rio Olympics.
Alifereti Dere	2010–13	
Waisale Serevi	2005–07; 2008–09	Serevi coached/played in the side from 2005 to 2007 guiding Fiji to their first World Sevens Series title in the 2005–2006 season.
Pauliasi Tabulutu	2004–06	
Wayne Pivac	2005	
Etuate Waqa		
Ratu Kitione Vesikula		
Rupeni Ravonu		
Peni Veidreyaki		
Alifereti Cawanibuka		
Tomasi Cama	2001	
Josateki Sovau	1987	
Sanivalati Laulau		
Timoci Wainiqolo		

== See also ==
- Fiji Rugby Union
- Fiji national rugby union team

== Bibliography ==
- McLaren, Bill A Visit to Hong Kong in Starmer-Smith, Nigel & Robertson, Ian (eds) The Whitbread Rugby World '90 (Lennard Books, 1989)
