= Viliame Satala =

Fiji international rugby union player

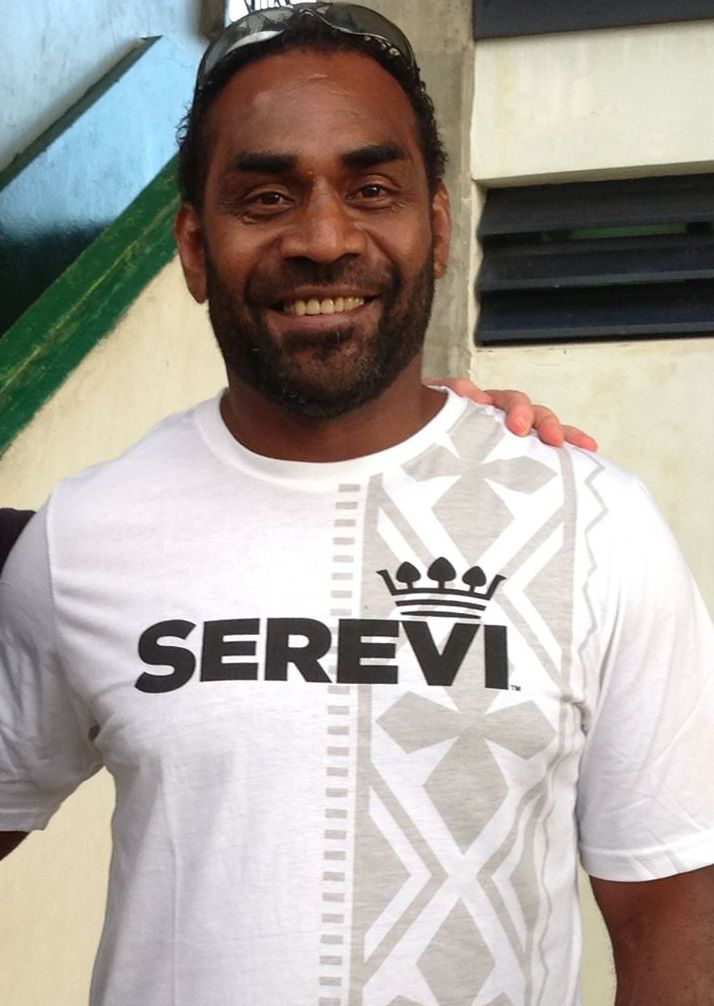
- Born: July 19, 1972 (age 54) Lautoka, Fiji
- Height: 6 ft 2 in (1.88 m)
- Weight: 210 lb (95 kg; 15 st)

Rugby union career
- Position: Centre
Senior career
Years	Team	Apps	(Points)
1992–1993	Kandy Sports Club		
1999	Mont-de-Marsan		
2002	NEC Harlequins		
International career
Years	Team	Apps	(Points)
1999-2005	Fiji	29	(80)
National sevens team
Years	Team		Comps
- Fiji 7s
Medal record
Men's rugby sevens
Representing Fiji
Commonwealth Games
Silver medal – second place	2002 Manchester	Team competition
Bronze medal – third place	2006 Melbourne	Team competition

Viliame Satala (born 19 July 1972) is a Fijian rugby union footballer. He plays as a centre or wing. His nickname is "The Stretcher" for his ability to flatten opposition players.

In 1999, rugby journalist Stephen Jones named Satala the best outside centre of the World Cup. Satala gained significant recognition in Fiji after scoring two tries for the Fiji Warriors against the Super 12 Chiefs in February 1999.

Satala played at the 1994 Hong Kong 7s, but was overlooked at 15s until the tour of UK in late 1998.

His two tries against the Chiefs, when he sidestepped veteran All Black Walter Little with ease, highlighted his potential, and since then he has been the first choice for the No. 13 shirt.

Satala played in all five of Fiji's Epson Cup matches in 1999, and all four of Fiji's RWC99 matches where he scored four tries. His record of 16 tries in 29 Test matches speaks for itself.

Satala is well known for the physical side of his game, the precision timing of his tackles: New Zealanders Christian Cullen, Tony Monaghan and Craig DeGoldi all had to leave the field on the IRB 7s circuit after meeting Satala and more recently Australian Scott Fava was stretchered off in the Commonwealth Games in 2005.

He captained Lautoka for several years, then signed on for French club side Mont-de-Marsan in October 1999.

Satala was also in Fiji's winning team at the 1999 Hong Kong 7s, when he played in the forwards.

In a club match in France in November 2000, Satala suffered a double fracture to his left arm, an injury that ruled him out of the World Cup 7s in Argentina.

He continued his impressive try record with three more in the Rugby World Cup qualifiers in June 2002, then helped Fiji to a silver medal at the Commonwealth Games in Manchester before joining NEC Harlequins in London.

Satala also very early in his career at the age of 20 had a stint with Sri Lankan Rugby Union side Kandy Sports Club in 1992.

Satala's vast experience showed at the 2005 7s World Cup where he helped Fiji raise the Melrose Cup aloft at Happy Valley. He has shown interest in wearing the Fiji Jumper for the 2007 Rugby World Cup. Satala plays for the Toyota Shokki club in Japan.

== Fiji Team ==
- Test debut: 1999 vs Canada in Vancouver
- 29 caps 16 tries 80 pts (36 games 18 tries 90 pts)
