= Semisi Naevo =

Fiji international rugby union player

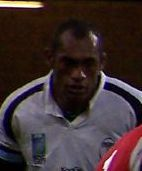
- Naevo at the 2007 Rugby World Cup
- Born: Ratu Meli Semisi Saukawa Naevo; 3 May 1975 (age 51) Nadi, Fiji
- Height: 1.97 m (6 ft 6 in)
- Weight: 115 kg (18 st 2 lb; 254 lb)
- School: Nawaka District School, Ratu Navula Secondary School, Nadi College.
- Notable relatives: Mother: Merewalesi; Father: Ratu Joeli Lesavua Naevo; Apenisa Naevo; Manoa Naevo
- Occupation: Business Man

Rugby union career
- Position: Flanker
Senior career
Years	Team	Apps	(Points)
1998–2003	Counties		
2003	Nawaka		
2003–2007	Green Rockets		
International career
Years	Team	Apps	(Points)
2006–2010	Fiji	14	(0)
2008	Pacific Islanders	2	(0)
National sevens team
Years	Team		Comps
2001 –	Fiji		19
Medal record
Men's rugby sevens
Representing Fiji
Commonwealth Games Silver Medal 2002
Bronze medal – third place	2006 Melbourne	Team competition

Ratu Meli Semisi Naevo Saukawa (born 3 May 1975 in Nawaka, Nadi) is a Fijian rugby union player. He plays as a flanker. His nickname is Man Mountain. His father, Joeli Lesavua, and two brothers, Apenisa and Manoa Naevo, are also Fiji reps.

== Career ==
He plays sevens for Fiji. He debuted in 2006 Pacific 5 Nations tournament. He is a member of the 2005 Rugby World Cup Sevens team, his speed and aerial skills made him a menace. He has captained the last two tournaments of the 2005–06 IRB 7s Series, and it was fitting that he won the London Sevens trophy and also the IRB sevens trophy.

In 2008 he was selected for the Pacific islanders.

In 2009 he was named co-captain for the team for the 2009 Dubai sevens.

=== Commonwealth Games ===
He was also part of the 2002 Commonwealth Games in Manchester where Fiji won the silver medal when they were defeated by New Zealand in the final after Fiji were reduced to 5 men for most of the game.

Semisi was also part of the 2006 Commonwealth Games where they won a bronze medal.

=== 2007 RWC ===
Naevo was also part of the Fiji 15's team that reached the Quarter-finals of the Rugby Union World Cup in 2007.
