= 2007 Colonial Cup =

Rugby union competition in Fiji

The 2007 Colonial Cup was rugby union competition held in Fiji. The Fiji Rugby Union controls the Colonial Cup which is used to pick players for the Fiji national team.

This year saw the emergence of a new team, the Bligh Roosters, based in Tavua. This took the number of competing teams to 6.

The Coastal Stallions were the 2007 champions, this being their third win since the tournament's inception in 2004.

== Teams ==
- Coastal Stallions - Nadroga
- Suva Highlanders - Suva, Naitasiri
- Western Crusaders - Lautoka, Nadi, Ba
- Tailevu Knights - Tailevu, Nasinu
- Northern Sharks - Vanua Levu
- Bligh Roosters - Tavua, Rakiraki

== Results from 2007 ==
=== Round 1 ===
Friday 2 Feb
Friday 2 Feb	Highlanders	23-21	Stallions	National Stadium

Saturday 3 Feb
Saturday 3 Feb	Knights	13–20	Crusaders	Ratu Cakobau Park

Sharks	29–20	Roosters	Subrail Park

=== Round 2 ===
Friday 9 Feb
Friday 9 Feb	Knights	11-7	Sharks	Nasau Park

Saturday 10 Feb
Saturday 10 Feb	Crusaders	22-16	Highlanders	Churchill Park

Roosters	12-19	Stallions	Garvey Park

=== Round 3 ===
Friday 16 Feb
Friday 16 Feb	Crusaders	16-22	Sharks	Prince Charles Park

Saturday 17 Feb
Saturday 17 Feb	Stallions	34-31	Knights	Lawaqa Park

Highlanders	33-15	Roosters	National Stadium

=== Round 4 ===
Friday 23 Feb
Friday 23 Feb	Highlanders	20-23	Knights	National Stadium

Saturday 24 Feb
Saturday 24 Feb	Sharks	33-38	Stallions	Subrail Park

Roosters	6-18	Crusaders	Ra Sports Complex

=== Round 5 ===
Friday 2 Mar
Friday 2 Mar	Stallions	5-12	Crusaders	Lawaqa Park

Saturday 3 Mar
Saturday 3 Mar	Sharks	5-20	Highlanders	Ganilau Park

Knights	38-15	Roosters	Ratu Cakobau Park

=== Final standings ===
Team	Played	Won	Drawn	Lost	For	Against	Point Difference	Bonus Points	Points
Crusaders	5	4	0	1	88	62	+26	1	17
Stallions	5	3	0	2	117	111	+6	4	16
Highlanders	5	3	0	2	112	86	+26	3	15
Knights	5	3	0	2	116	96	+20	3	15
Sharks	5	2	0	3	96	105	-9	4	12
Roosters	5	0	0	5	68	137	-69	1	1

4 points for a win; 2 for a draw; 1 bonus point for scoring four or more tries in a match; 1 bonus point for losing by 7 points or less.

=== Semi-finals ===
Saturday 10 Mar
Saturday 10 Mar	Highlanders	6-15	Stallions	Ratu Cakobau Park

Crusaders	15-6	Knights	Ratu Cakobau Park

=== Grand final ===
Saturday 17 Mar
Saturday 17 Mar	Crusaders	12-14	Stallions	Churchill Park
