= Western Crusaders =

(Fiji) Western Crusaders
- Union: Fiji Rugby Union
- Coach: Iliesa Tanivula
- Captain: Aporosa Vata
- League: Colonial Cup

The Western Crusaders is a Fijian former rugby union team that had a franchise area coverering Lautoka, Nadi, and Yasawa. The team played in the Colonial Cup from 2004 to 2008 before the competition ceased in 2008.

== History ==
The franchise was one of four original teams created for the inaugural Colonial Cup in 2004. Western Crusaders made the Grand final of the 2005 Colonial Cup but lost 35–27 to Suva Highlanders. Bligh Roosters joined the 2007 competition; Western Crusaders gave up Tavua, Vatukoula, Ba and Ra to the new franchise.

== Club honours ==
- Colonial Cup runners-up 2005, 2007, 2008 colonial Cup champion

== 2007 Squad ==
Taniela Rawaqa, Jona Nareki, Kusitino Vatu, Vereniki Goneva, Atunaisa Ratu, Jo Tora, Aseri Latianara, Waisea Luveniyali, Aporosa Vata (capt), Sunia Nadruku, Kelepi Ketedromo, Sam Tabua, Ifereimi Naruma, Ropate Senikuraciri, Jonacani Batirua, Sikeli Donu, Aseri Tale, Sikeli Gavidi, Sikeli Nasau, Aseri Buli, Paula Cata, Semi Lotawa

== Coaching team ==
- Iliesa Tanivula
- Iferemi Tawake
- Team Manager: Pete Rabuka.
