= List of football stadiums in Fiji =

The following list is a list of football stadiums in Fiji. The stadiums are listed in capacity order.

== Stadiums ==
#	Image	Stadium	Capacity	City	Reference
1	Churchill Park	Churchill Park	18,000	Lautoka	
2	HFC Bank Stadium/ANZ Stadium	HFC Bank Stadium	15,466	Suva	
3	Govind Park	Govind Park	13,500	Ba	
4		Lawaqa Park	10,000	Sigatoka	
5	Subrail Park	Subrail Park	10,000	Labasa	
6		Prince Charles Park	8,000	Nadi	
7		Ratu Cakobau Park	8,000	Nausori	
8		Garvey Park	4,500	Tavua	
9		Uprising Resort Ground	2,000	Pacific Harbour	
10		Ganilau Park	1,120	Savusavu	
11		Thomson Park	1,000	Navua	
12		Nasinu Park	1,000	Nasinu	
13		Fiji Sugar Corporation Ground	1,000	Rakiraki	

Churchill Park, HFC Bank Stadium and Govind Park are usually used for the Fiji national football team matches.
