= Vereniki Goneva =

Fijian rugby union player (born 1984)

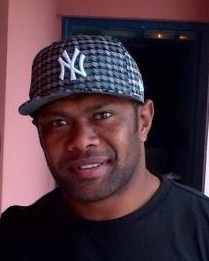
- Goneva in 2014
- Born: Vereniki Goneva; 5 April 1984 (age 42) Lautoka, Fiji
- Height: 5.9 ft (1.79 m)
- Weight: 102 kg (16 st 1 lb; 225 lb)

Rugby union career
- Position(s): Wing, Centre, Fullback
Senior career
Years	Team	Apps	(Points)
2008	Rotherham Titans	3	(0)
2009–2011	US Colomiers	46	(28)
2011–2012	Tarbes	19	(40)
2012–2016	Leicester Tigers	89	(205)
2016–2019	Newcastle Falcons	60	(145)
2019–2020	Harlequins	8	(0)
2020-2022	Mont-de-Marsan	46	(30)
2022-2024	Chambérien	32	(40)
- Correct as of 25 February 2025
International career
Years	Team	Apps	(Points)
2007–2019	Fiji	59	(110)
- Correct as of 7 September 2021
National sevens team
Years	Team		Comps
2007–2009	Fiji		8

Vereniki Goneva (born 5 April 1984) is a retired Fijian rugby union footballer who played club rugby in England and France. He played as a centre or wing.

Goneva made his debut in English rugby for Rotherham against Northampton Saints in the RFU Championship in the 2007–2008 season. He played for Leicester Tigers from 2012 to 2016, where he won the Aviva Premiership title, before signing with Newcastle Falcons. He has been Premiership Rugby's top try scorer during two seasons.

== Career ==
Goneva was first spotted by the Fiji sevens coach, Waisale Serevi playing as a wing for Nadi in the Digicel Cup competition and he was impressed by his workrate and included him in the 2007-08 IRB Sevens World Series and he made his debut in the 2nd leg, George Sevens where Fiji lost in the cup final to New Zealand. He had interest in power lifting stating that it influenced his powerful style of play. In the same year he played in the Colonial Cup for the Western Crusaders team but lost in the finals to Coastal Stallions. He was selected into the Fiji Barbarians team for the 2007 Pacific Rugby Cup though the team wasn't able to make the semis, his impressive runs continued and after making his debut for the Fiji sevens team, he jetted off to Rotherham Titans. After a short stint, he came back and rejoined the sevens team. He co-captained the team in the Wellington and San Diego leg. after the 2009 season, he joined the Fiji 15's team for the 2009 IRB Pacific Nations Cup where he was instrumental in the win against Samoa, coming off the bench and scoring the match-winning try and against Japan where he set up the match-winning try to Number 8, Netani Talei. He later got an offer which he took, to play in the French Pro D2 competition for US Colomiers. He was included in the 30-member Fiji squad for the 2009 Autumn Internationals

Goneva was included in the Fiji team for the 2011 IRB Pacific Nations Cup. After a successful outing, he was selected in the 22 to play the All Blacks in Dunedin. He came off the bench and scored an outstanding individual try. He was later selected to play against Tonga in the Punjas Rugby series. He was selected into the Fiji team to the 2011 Rugby World Cup and he made his world cup debut on the right wing for Fiji against Namibia. He scored 4 tries and won the Man of the Match award as well.

Goneva played rugby in the ProD2 for Tarbes between 2008 and 2011 and was named best centre in 2012 in the ProD2.

=== Leicester Tigers ===
In May 2012, Goneva signed a contract to join Aviva Premiership team Leicester Tigers. Goneva claimed that the only reason he chose to play for the Tigers was because their Rugby director, Richard Cockerill personally flew to France just to speak to him regarding him joining the club.

Goneva scored a try on debut against London Welsh in the 2012–13 English Premiership. He scored a try as well as setting one up for his other winger in the 2012–13 English Premiership Final helping his team win the title. Even though he was injured for most of the season, he played 11 games for them and scored 5 tries.

In the 2013–14 English Premiership; in his first game against Worcester Warriors, he scored a stunning individual try to give him team a bonus-point win, a week later, he started at his preferred position at 13 and scored another brilliant try against Bath but it wasn't enough as the Tigers lost but Goneva's try secured them a bonus-point loss. He started at outside centre again in their game against the Chiefs due to a long-term injury to their incumbent centre, Manu Tuilagi, scoring a try late in the first half, his performance got him the Man of the Match award as well.

In March 2014, Goneva scored 2 brilliant tries against Newcastle taking his tally to 10 for the season which has led to discussion by the club to try to hold on to Goneva for another season as he is in talks to return to France with Top 14 side, Castres.

In April 2014, Goneva re-signed with the Tigers for another two season.

In May 2014, Goneva was crowned 2014 players' player of the year at Wednesday night's Rugby Players' Association awards dinner in Battersea.

Goneva started the new season the same way he ended the last season when he scored a hat-trick of tries against Newcastle taking his try tally for the Tigers to 27.

In the 2015–16 European Rugby Champions Cup, he scored a try in every game finishing with 6 tries in 5 matches in the Knock-out round making him the competition's top try scorer alongside Thomas Waldrom.

=== Newcastle Falcons ===
In March 2016, Goneva signed a contract with Newcastle Falcons. He suffered an injury at the beginning of the season which ruled him out of the 2016–17 European Rugby Challenge Cup and most of the 2016–17 English Premiership season but he did end up playing 19 games for Falcons that season scoring 9 tries. He scored his 40th try overall in the premiership after he bagged a double against Bristol in their final pool match but were unable to progress to the quarter finals.

Goneva played his 100th Premiership match against his old team, Leicester Tigers on 28 April 2018 scoring 2 tries and taking his premiership try tally to 53.

In May 2018, Goneva won the 2017-18 Aviva Premiership player of the season.

Goneva finished the season for Newcastle with 58 games and 29 tries.

=== Harlequins ===
On 3 July 2019, Harlequins announced that they had signed Goneva for the upcoming 2019-20 season.

=== Mont-de-Marsan ===
On 21 June 2020, Goneva returned to France to sign for Pro D2 side Mont-de-Marsan ahead of the 2020–21 season.
