= Bligh Roosters =

(Fiji) Bligh Roosters
- Union: Fiji Rugby Union
- Coach(es): Manasa Bari
- Captain(s): Emori Ratu
- League(s): Colonial Cup

The Bligh Roosters is a Fijian former rugby union team that had a franchise area covering Tavua, Vatukoula, Ba and Ra. The team played in Fiji's Colonial Cup in 2007 and 2008 before the competition ceased in 2008.

== History ==
Fiji Rugby Union High Performance Unit manager, Peter Murphy, was responsible for the team's training programme in 2006 to prepare the team to enter the competition for the 2007 season. Most of the players in the team were from nearby villages or had and worked in the region's gold mines. The team played its first match against the Northern Sharks in Labasa on 3 February 2007.

== 2007 Squad ==
Emori Ratu (capt), Simeli Tuiteci, Josateki Mami, Mesulame Soga, Sekove Vuniwaqa, Sainivalati Kenatale, Noa Rokomatu, Waisake Gaugau, Joeli Matai, Isei Matai, Kini Namoumou, Epeli Vuniwaqa, Kini Radaveta, Emori Bolobolo, Malakai Bari, Senirusi Rauqe, Seta Ratoto, Savenaca Driu, Petero Natau, Joeli Lotawa, Iveri Momo, Apisalome Take

== Coach ==
- Manasa Bari
