= Jone Qovu =

Fijian rugby union player (born 1985)

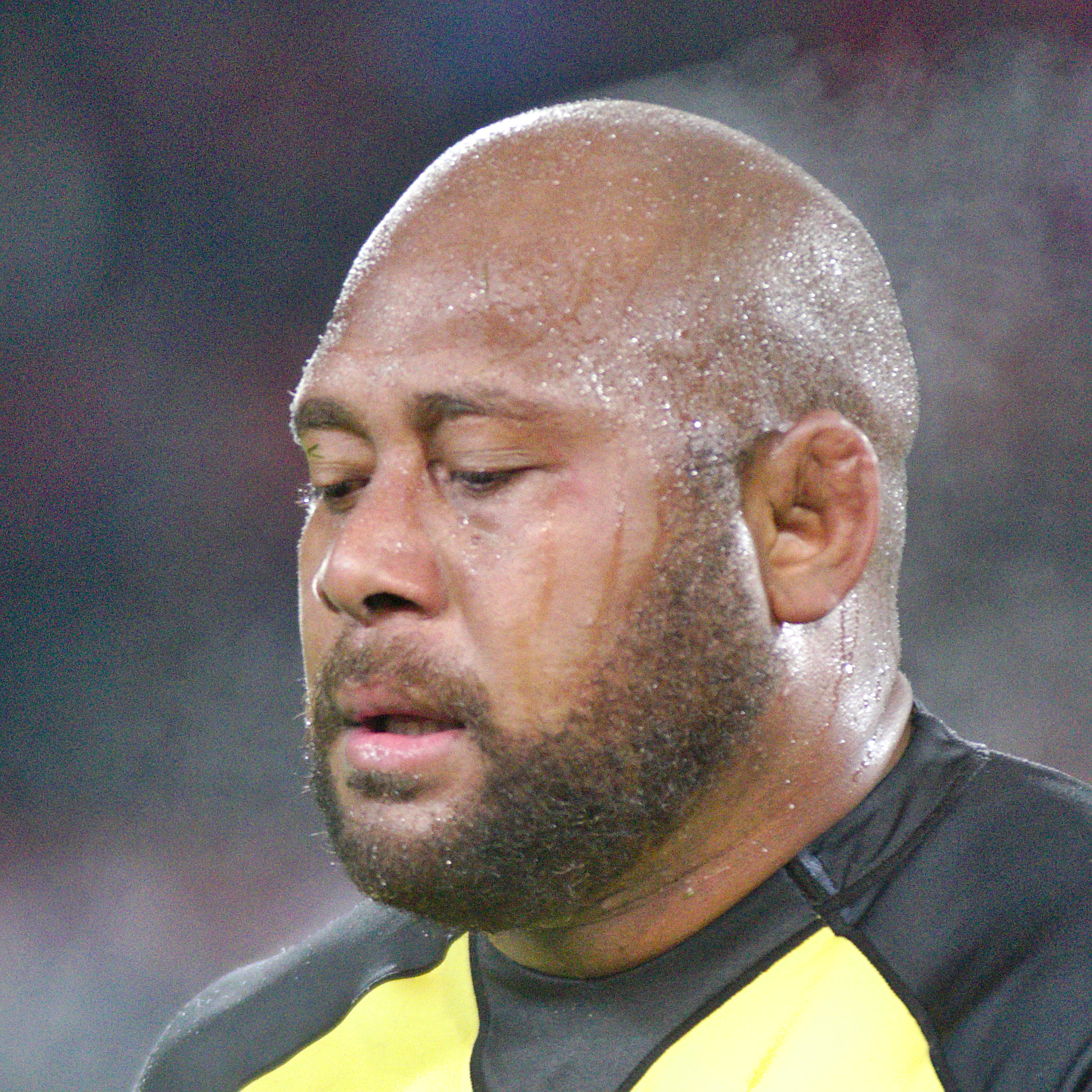
- Qovu in November 2014
- Born: Jone Qovu Nailiko; 27 August 1985 (age 41) Sigatoka, Fiji
- Height: 1.97 m (6 ft 6 in)
- Weight: 139 kg (21 st 12 lb)

Rugby union career
- Position(s): Number eight, Flanker, Lock
Senior career
Years	Team	Apps	(Points)
2000–2003	Senibiau		
2003–2005	Nadroga		
2005	Sharks	5	(5)
2005–2007	Ovalau		
2006–2007	Stallions	9	(0)
2006–2007	Fiji Warriors	10	(0)
2007–2014	Racing Métro	123	(85)
2014–2020	La Rochelle	106	(55)
2020–	Niortais	6	(0)
- Correct as of 23 July 2012
International career
Years	Team	Apps	(Points)
2005–2010	Fiji	13	(5)
- Correct as of 23 July 2012

Jone Qovu Nailiko (born Sigatoka, 27 August 1985) is a Fijian rugby union player. He plays as a number eight for Niortais.

Played formerly for Racing Metro and La Rochelle in the Top 14 in France.

Selected for Fiji schoolboys U18 tour to NZ in 2002 after impressing with his size and physicality for Sigatoka Methodist College in the Deans Trophy competition. Played alongside future flying Fijians players in Talemaitoga Tuapati, Derryk Thomas and Waisale Sukanaveita.

== Career ==
He currently plays for Stade Niortais, in France. Qovu made his debut for Fiji on 3 June 2005, in a 27–29 loss to New Zealand Maori. He was selected for the 2007 Rugby World Cup finals and he played in the 12–55 loss to Australia.
