= Suva Highlanders =

(Fiji) Suva Highlanders
- Full name: Suva Highlanders
- Union: Fiji Rugby Union
- Coach(es): Etuate Waqa
- Captain(s): Dale Tonawai
- League(s): Colonial Cup

The Suva Highlanders is a Fijian former rugby union team that had a franchise area covering Suva, Naitasiri and Kadavu. The team played in Fiji's premier the Colonial Cup from 2004 to 2008 before the competition ceased in 2008.

== History ==
The franchise was one of four original teams created for the inaugural Colonial Cup in 2004. Suva Highlanders lost 26–21 to Coastal Stallions in the Grand final of the 2004 Colonial Cup. Northern Sharks were added to the 2005 competition, previously the Northern Division had belonged to the Suva franchise. Suva Highlanders won the Grand final with a 35–27 win over Western Crusaders. Suva Highlanders made the Grand final again in 2006 but lost 29–15 to Coastal Stallions in a tough encounter.

== Club honours ==
- Colonial Cup winners 2005
- runners-up 2004, 2006

== The 2007 Squad ==
The 2007 Colonial Cup squad is as follows:

Sunia Koto, Bill Gadolo, Sunia Radovu, Maseikula Gaunavou, Aisake Tarogi, Alefoso Yalayalatabua, Inoke Vasu, Sireli Temo, Wame Lewaravu, Mosese Vasuitoga, Fatafehi Komaisavai, Sainivalati Vunibola, Dale Tonawai, Koresi Ledua, Samu Bola, Mitieli Cama, Samu Kunanitu, Nikolai Baleitamavua, Derek Thomas, Apenisa Ratugoleanavanua, Waisale Vatuvoka, Valerio Racika, Apisai Salada, Sisa Waqa, Sevina Nanuku, Josevata Bola, Kelemedi Bola, Rt Marika Vakacegu, Alusio Buto, Daniele Tabuakuru, Josefa Satini, Paula Tiko, Leone Ratulevu, Manueli Nawalu, Filimoni Bolavucu

== Coaching team ==
- Head Coach: Etuate Waqa
- Manager: Isei Rayawa
- Captain: Dale Tonawai
