= Maleli Kunavore =

Fiji international rugby union player

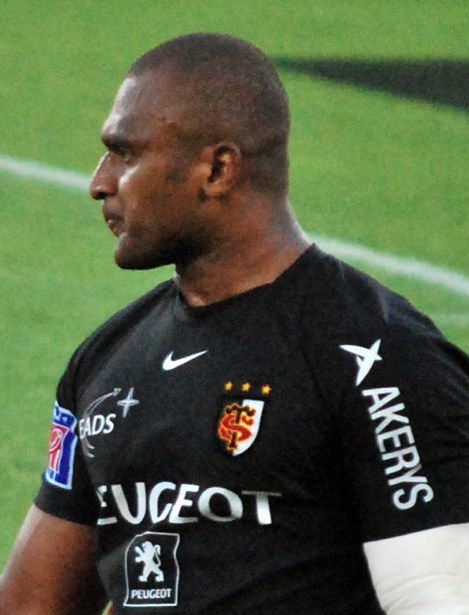
- Kunavore in action for Toulouse
- Born: 13 November 1983 Sigatoka, Fiji
- Died: 15 November 2012 (aged 29)
- Height: 1.82 m (5 ft 11 1/2 in)
- Weight: 100 kg (15 st 10 lb; 220 lb)
- Notable relative: Napolioni Nalaga

Rugby union career
- Position(s): Centre, Wing, Fullback
Senior career
Years	Team	Apps	(Points)
2005	Nadroga		
2005	Stallions	5	(19)
2005–2010	Toulouse	80	(101)
International career
Years	Team	Apps	(Points)
2005 - 2010	Fiji	7	(10)

Maleli Kunavore (13 November 1983 – 15 November 2012) was a Fijian rugby union footballer.

== Career ==
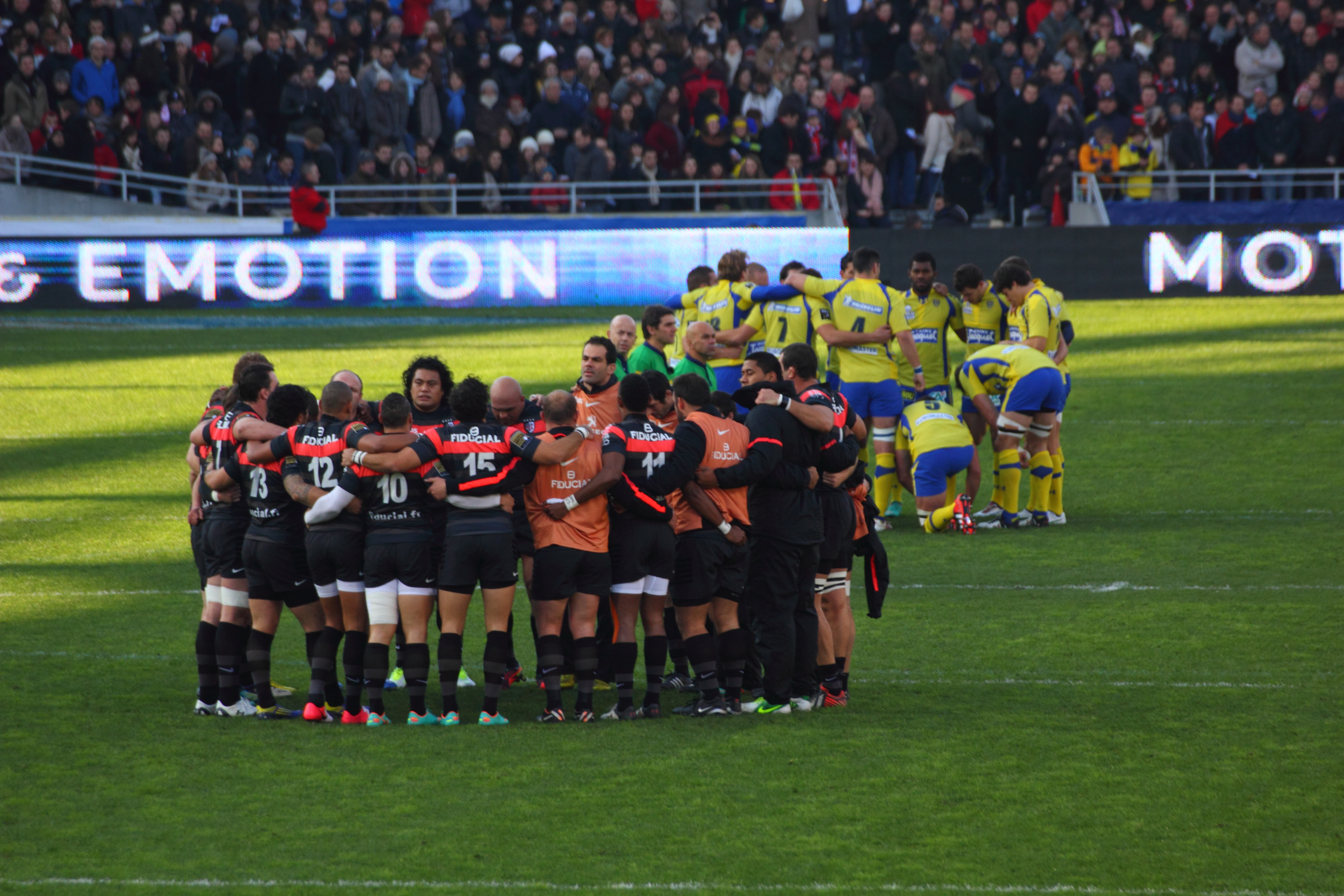
On 1 December 2012, a minute of applause was observed to pay tribute to his death.

He played as a centre, wing or fullback. He played for Toulouse in the Top 14 and Heineken Cup. He was found by Fiji coach Wayne Pivac when he spotted Maleli playing in the Colonial Cup for the Coastal Stallions. He was selected for the national team for the Pacific 5 Nations tournament. After a game against Japan he and a few other players were caught in a brawl and were suspended from playing any games in and for Fiji until 31 December 2006.

A product of the Nadi Muslim Academy, Kunavore began to shine when he represented the Fiji U21 side in 2004. A year later the solid speedster was the top try scorer for the Stallions in the Colonial Cup. He improved with every match and scored one try and two conversions to help his province Nadroga with the Fiji Cup final in 2005. He then earned his first Test cap and also scored a try to help Fiji defeat Samoa 21–15 in Suva. In mid-2005 he left Fiji's shores for a position at Toulouse in France.

In early 2010, Kunavore suffered two major injuries to his left arm. He underwent a cardiac operation. He left Toulouse and retired from rugby soon after.

On 15 November 2012, he suffered a cardiac arrest and he died at his home in Suva. He was 29 years of age.
