= Gabiriele Lovobalavu =

Fijian rugby union player (born 1985)

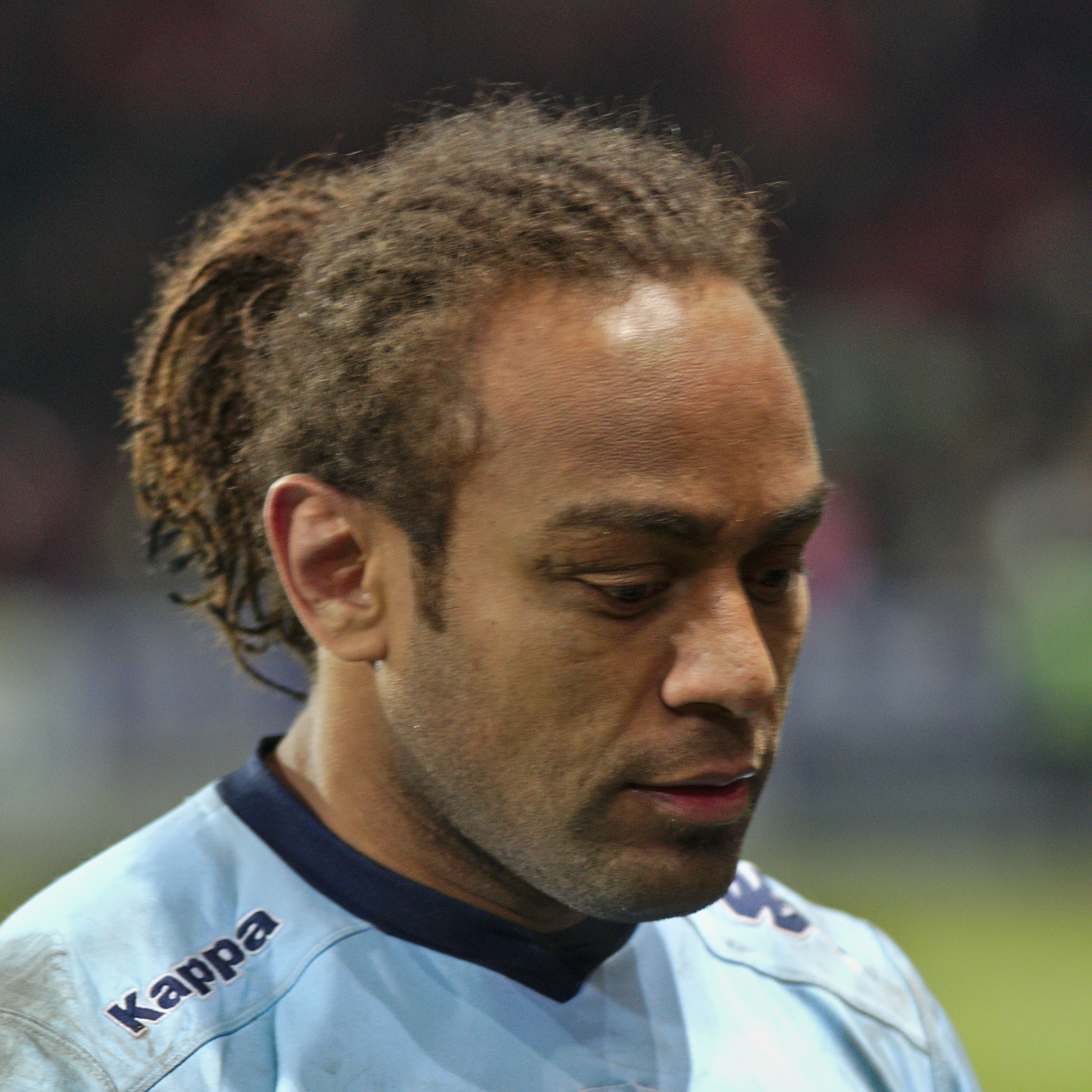
- Born: Gabiriele Voduadua Lovobalavu; 20 June 1985 (age 41) Savusavu, Fiji
- Height: 1.82 m (6 ft 0 in)
- Weight: 95 kg (14 st 13 lb)
- School: Marist Brothers High School

Rugby union career
- Position(s): Centre, Wing
Senior career
Years	Team	Apps	(Points)
2007	Sharks	5	(0)
2007	Fiji Warriors	5	(0)
2008–2012	Toulon	86	(95)
2012–2017	Bayonne	78	(65)
2017–2019	Wasps	37	(10)
2019-2023	Oyonnax	64	(45)
- Correct as of 24 August 2015
International career
Years	Team	Apps	(Points)
2007–2015	Fiji	22	(10)
- Correct as of 23 September 2015

Gabiriele Voduadua Lovobalavu (born 20 June 1985 in Savusavu) is a Fijian rugby union player. He plays as a centre.

Lovobalavu is from Kanakana, Tunuloa in Cakaudrove Province. Prior to completing his Diploma in Teaching at Corpus Christi College, Lovobalavu pursued rugby as a career.

He played for the Sharks and Fiji Warriors in Fiji before joining Toulon in the French Top 14, in January 2008.

He was one of the youngest players selected for Fiji at the 2007 Rugby World Cup finals in France. He played against Australia and South Africa in the quarter-finals. He also competed at the 2011 Rugby World Cup in New Zealand.

On 27 February 2017, Gabriele will join English club Wasps at the Ricoh Arena in the Aviva Premiership from the 2017–18 season.
