= Charlie Charters =

English rugby union official and thriller writer

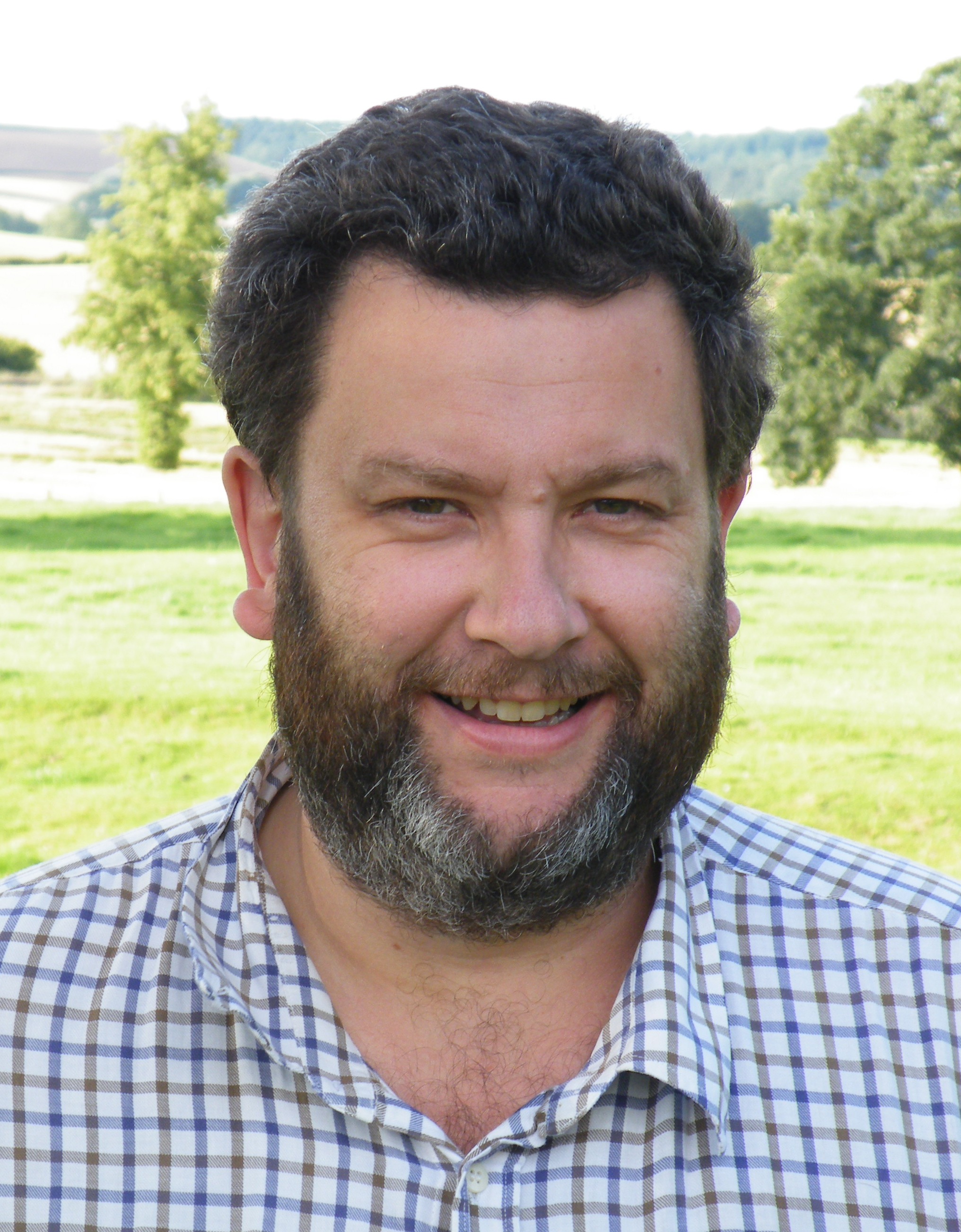
Charlie Charters in Yorkshire July 2009

Charlie Charters (born 1968, London) is a former rugby union official and sports marketing executive turned thriller writer whose debut book Bolt Action was published by Hodder & Stoughton in 2010. Charters was raised in Fiji where his mother was making a documentary film and met his father, a tobacco farmer. He is the son-in-law of well-known Fijian businesswoman and deposed Member of Parliament Mere Samisoni. He and his wife Vanessa divide their time between a house near Barton-le-Willows, North Yorkshire, and Suva, Fiji.

== Early life ==
Charters attended Rugby School, Downing College, Cambridge where he was friends with former England cricket captain Mike Atherton and author Toby Young, and the Centre for Journalism Studies, Cardiff University, where his contemporaries included BBC reporters Dominic Hughes, Laura Trevelyan, Simon Hall and "The Dig Tree" author, the late Sarah Murgatroyd. While studying in Cardiff, he worked as a subeditor on the Western Mail (Wales) and DJ on South Wales radio station Red Dragon FM. Charters was a stringer for United Press International (UPI) in Croatia, a TV presenter in Fiji and a freelance journalist in Hong Kong before embarking on a sports marketing career with Seamus O'Brien at the World Sport Group. Along with Dale Tempest and Spencer Robinson, Charters was a noted part-time sports presenter for Hong Kong's ATV World.

== Pacific Islands Rugby Alliance ==
The idea of combining the best rugby talent in the Pacific dates back to at least 1924, and the first tour by a Fiji side to Samoa. This visit proved so popular that a hybrid 'inter-island' team to play in New Zealand was proposed but never eventuated.

On 26 August 1995 the International Rugby Board (IRB) declared rugby union an 'open' or professional game. Quickly teams within the resulting South Africa, New Zealand and Australian Rugby unions (SANZAR) structure as well as Australian club and New Zealand National Provincial Championship teams began offering lucrative professional contracts to island players forcing the largely amateur rugby structures in the Pacific into near-collapse as they tried to hold on to their best players and brightest prospects. It was in these conditions, with the three Unions playing fewer Tests and losing by larger margins as more of their top players were contracted in New Zealand, Australia, Japan or Europe, that the time was right for the three Unions to consider pooling their talent.

In 2001 Charters, then marketing manager of the Fiji Rugby Union, attended a meeting in Auckland, which outlined possible governance structures for Pacific Islands Rugby Alliance (PIRA) using the model of the four-country British & Irish Lions. With his background in sports marketing. Charters was selected as PIRA's first chief executive officer. The initial idea was to launch the Islanders in 2002 with lucrative first matches against the All Blacks and Springboks. But, before the dates of the proposed Islanders' Tests, the England rugby team were scheduled to tour Fiji, Samoa and Tonga individually and with the Rugby Football Union refusing to accept the proposed tour dates because of the late-running of the then Zurich Premiership, the IRB were forced to adjudicate, refusing to sanction the proposed 2002 Islanders matches.

In April 2003, the IRB agreed to the concept of the Pacific Islanders with the first Test match against the Wallabies the following year. For former All Black Michael Jones, then coach of Manu Samoa and assistant coach to John Boe with the 2004 Islanders, it was dream come true: 'We’ve always believed that once you did bring the best of the Samoans, the Fijians and the Tongans together, potentially it has the ability to be something very, very special.'

Although the 2004 Islanders lost each of the three Test matches they played (29-14 v Wallabies, 41-26 v All Blacks and 24-38 v Springboks in Gosford, Australia), they scored 10 tries in three matches. By comparison that same southern hemisphere season, England and Scotland scored only three tries between them in their five Tests against the All Blacks and Wallabies. In fact, the 2004 Islanders scored more tries in one Test against the All Blacks (four) than the three tries the 2005 British & Irish Lions would manage in three Tests the following year.

'What a case they have made for their place at the game's top table,’ said one report, after the final match of the 2004 edition. 'If this was the death throes of Pacific islands rugby it was a pretty spectacular way to go.'

Charters was one of several closely connected with Pacific island rugby, like Bryan Williams (rugby), Rod MacQueen and Pio Bosco Tikoisuva, to urge the IRB and SANZAR to do more to create a level playing field, particularly by selecting a Pacific team for either Super Rugby or the Tri-Nations which was mooted to expand in the 2006 season. He even challenged rugby bosses in New Zealand or Australia to hold a referendum among fans to see if they wanted a Pacific team in an expanded SANZAR structure or an additional side carved up from within the existing structure.

The issue of a better deal for Pacific island rugby cut into international politics when, immediately after the obvious success of the 2004 tour, Australian prime minister John Howard and his New Zealand counterpart Helen Clark said they would lobby their respective national unions about inclusion to SANZAR.

In December 2004, SANZAR announced two additional teams would be created for the 2006 season under a new US$323 million, five-year television deal with News Corporation but neither would be from the Pacific. The Super 14 would feature a new Australian team based in Perth, the Western Force, and a new South African team, the Cheetahs. Additionally a third round of fixtures was added to the Tri-Nations.

== Writing ==
Charters' first script garnered media attention (but no deal) because it drew on his considerable experience of the seamy side of professional sport from his time working for the Swiss sports marketing company ISL, which collapsed in 2001 with debts of more than $300 million despite holding exclusive rights to major global sports governing bodies and their events.

Charters said he finished the script for Bolt Action listening to the commentary of the Pacific Islanders playing Italy on 22 November 2008. 'When the whistle blew for full time, the first Islanders Test win [17 points to 25], I was within 10 minutes of finishing my script. And I knew then that Bolt Action would be blessed with good luck.' Charters' agent is Charlie Viney of The Viney Agency.

On 8 February 2011, Charters became the first British debut author to be nominated for the Best Thriller category of Deadly Pleasures' Magazine's Barry Award (for crime novels).

== Arrest and Detention by FICAC ==
Charters was stopped by officers from the Fiji Independent Corruption Agency Against Corruption law enforcement agency as he was preparing to board a flight from Nadi to Sydney on 21 February 2026.

He was transported to Suva and spent two nights in detention at FICAC House before being charged on 23 February with two counts of aiding and abetting the breach of the 2007 FICAC Act.

The charges related to two FICAC documents that Charters published on his popular Facebook page alleging incompetence and nepotism by the acting FICAC Commissioner Lavi Rokoika. The popularity of his writing increased after he started to write critically about the Commission of Inquiry into the Appointment of the previous Commissioner of FICAC and the family ties between Rokoika and her brother-in-law Gilbert Vakalalabure who lead the Fiji Sports Council.

Both were also related to Fiji's prime minister Sitiveni Rabuka.

In a message smuggled out of his Suva jail cell and then published by local media, Charters revealed he was offered a deal by FICAC that he would be free to catch his flight if he revealed who his sources were within FICAC which he declined.

On 28 April, Charters' lawyer Seforan Fatiaki filed a permanent stay application against the two charges, and served this on FICAC on 5 May .

On 24 July, Fiji's High Court permanently stopped the criminal proceedings against Charters after finding that FICAC had breached his constitutional rights and abused the court process.

The ruling by Justice Pita Bulamainaivalu has been praised by media and whistleblower-protection campaigners for setting out more clearly a citizen's freedom of expression rights and for clarifying that the state cannot violate a citizen's right against self-incrimination.
