= Emosi Vucago =

Fijian rugby union player (born 1983)

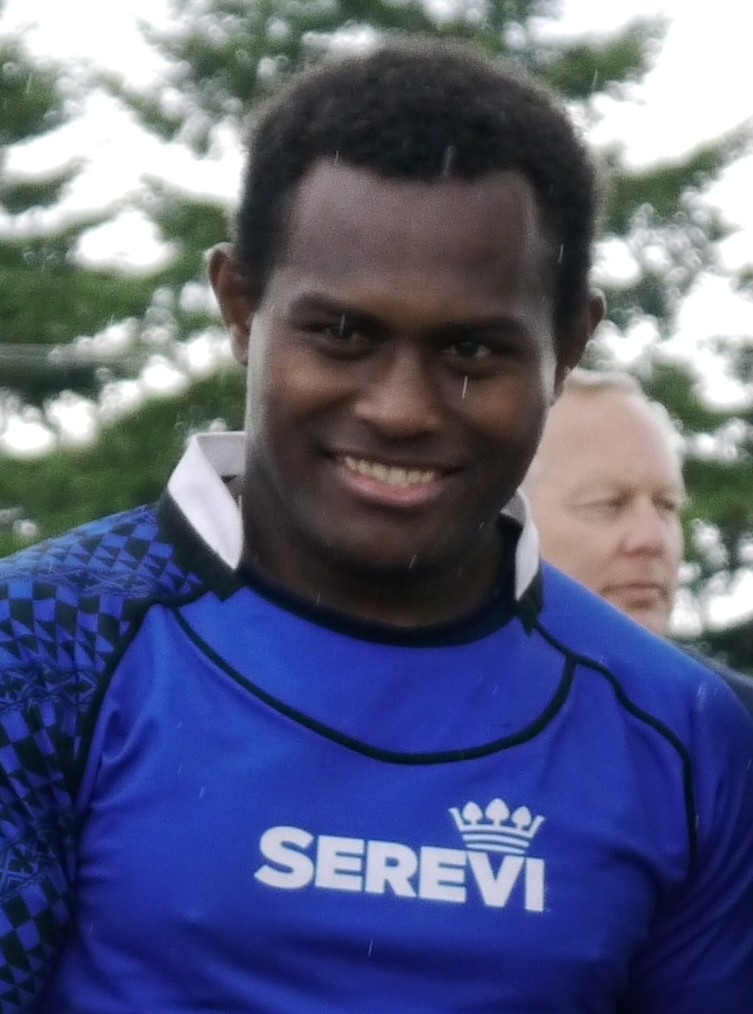
- Born: Ratu Emosi Vucago; May 10, 1983 (age 43) Fiji
- Height: 1.70 m (5 ft 7 in)
- Weight: 77 kg (12 st 2 lb; 170 lb)

Rugby union career
- Position: Half-back
Senior career
Years	Team	Apps	(Points)
- Nadroga
2013-	OPSB		
International career
Years	Team	Apps	(Points)
2006-2010	Fiji	3	(0)
National sevens team
Years	Team		Comps
2007–present	Fiji 7s		

Ratu Emosi Vucago (born May 10, 1983) is a Fiji Rugby union player. He plays as a half-back in the Fifteens man-code and also as a halfback/fly-half in the Sevens code He has also been part Fiji Sevens team since the Wellington leg in 2007. He is a cousin of Fiji national Fly Half, Seremaia Bai

In the Fifteens version of the game, he plays as a half-back and has represented Nadroga several times in the Digicel Cup and he also plays for the Coastal Stallions in the Colonial Cup as well as being part of their 2006 winning team. He made his fifteens debut against Tonga in Gosford Park, Australia in June 2006 where they lost by a point. Emosi is currently the vice captain for Fiji in the 2011/12 HSBC Series.

== Career highlights ==
- Fiji Sevens 2007–present
- Coastal Stallions 2006–present
- Nadroga – 2007–present
