= Garvey Park =

Sports venue in Tavua, Fiji

Coordinates: 17°26′40″S 177°51′43″E

Garvey Park is a multi-use stadium in Tavua, Fiji named after the colonial governor Ronald Garvey. It is currently used mostly for football and also for Colonial Cup and Digicel Cup matches and hosts the home matches of Tavua F.C. and the Bligh Roosters. The stadium holds 4,500 people.
