= Manu Korovulavula =

Fijian politician (1934–2023)

Ratu Manu Korovulavula OF

Minister of Transport and Works
- In office 8 January 2007 – 4 January 2008
- Prime Minister: Frank Bainimarama
- Succeeded by: Timoci Natuva

Minister of Energy
- In office 8 January 2007 – 4 January 2008
- Succeeded by: Mahendra Chaudhry

Personal details
- Born: 22 June 1934 Suva, Colony of Fiji
- Died: 6 November 2023 (aged 89) Fiji

Ratu Manunivavalagi Korovulavula OF (22 June 1934 – 6 November 2023) was a Fijian political leader and civil servant. A Senator, Korovulavula was appointed Minister for Transport in the interim Cabinet of Commodore Frank Bainimarama on 8 January 2007, following the military coup on 5 December 2006. He had also previously served in Ratu Sir Kamisese Mara's Interim Cabinet after the 1987 coup led by Sitiveni Rabuka. He was an unsuccessful candidate twice, for the Fijian Association Party and National Alliance Party, in the elections of 1999 and 2006, respectively. He served as treasurer of both parties.

A career civil servant, Korovulavula started as a soldier and fought in the Malayan Campaign against the Chinese Communists in the 1950s. He held a number of government positions, among them that of CEO of Land Transport Authority the former Department of Road Transport. He had first worked as a civil servant in LTA (Land Transport Authority of Fiji) then worked in Parliament House in the early 2000.

Korovulavula held professional qualifications from Australia and the UK and was a member of the Chartered Institute of Transport and Logistics in the United Kingdom.

Korovulavula also held positions as a sports administrator, being the chairman of the Fiji Sports Council in the 1980s and was a life member of the Fiji Basketball Federation.

Korovulavula also was a well known music composer and singer and was leader of a famous Fijian band, the Southern Brothers from the 1950s to the 1970s. His hits included "Nuku Vulavula", (Ena Veivei Gauna) "Vakanananu Lesu", "Au Moce Buna Au Qai Tadra", (Ni Lutu Na Yakavi Ena Toba Ko) "Suva".

Following the 2006 Fijian coup d'état, he was appointed Minister of Transport, Works and Energy in the interim military regime. He was replaced as a Minister in a cabinet reshuffle in January 2008. He was subsequently controversially appointed to the Public Accounts Committee.

Korovulavula was made an Officer of the Order of Fiji in the Republic of Fiji Honours List in the early 2000s for his services as administrator in the field of music, having co-founded the Fiji Composers Association and Fiji Performing Rights Association and holding Chairmanship of both organisations and helping improve the livelihood and welfare of Fiji musicians and composers.

In 2014, he wrote a book about the Malayan campaign.

== Personal life and death ==
Ratu Manu grew up during the World War years when American and New Zealand soldiers were stationed in Fiji. As a young boy Manu lived with his grandparents, Ivamere Korovulavula and Jovesa Korovulavula, his father, Major Isireli Korovulavula, was an officer in the Fijian army and fought in the war when World War II had taken place, he was awarded the Military Cross. Ratu Manu attended Suva Methodist Boys School at Toorak.

Manu Korovulavula died on 6 November 2023, at the age of 89.
