= Farebrother-Sullivan Trophy =

Fijian rugby union competition

The Farebrother-Sullivan Trophy is a Fijian rugby union competition open to the regional representative teams of the districts of Fiji.

== History ==
The trophy was offered to the Fiji Rugby Union by JJ Sullivan and AS Farebrother, the latter being the manager of the first Fijian team to play abroad in 1924.

Between 1941 and 1953, this competition was disputed in the form of cup between the regional district teams. Five of them would participate to the first edition in 1941. Since 1954, the competition develops around a match: the holder of the trophy accept the challenges from the other teams and the trophy is attributed to the winning team. This format is also used in New Zealand, in the Ranfurly Shield. The challenges generally are played at the end of summer and in autumn. In case of draw, the defending champion keeps the trophy. Practically, only the three teams from the first division of the regional competition, the Colonial Cup, compete, but for three times, a team from the inferior division, the B-Division, challenged the defending champion. Suva, won the trophy between 1941 and 1947, undefeated in 1951. Nadroga dominated the competition in the 1970s, establishing the record of 28 consecutive wins, before Nadi came to join the competition in the 1980s. In the late 1990s, Lautoka and then, Naitasiri, founded in 1998, became the fourth and fifth great names of the competition.

== Results ==
The defending champion is listed first. The victorious challengers are signed with a °

2008

- Tailevu 17-14 Nadroga

2007

- Tailevu 25-13 Tavua
- Tailevu 13-8 Nadi
- Tailevu-Lautoka 17-10
- Tailevu 25-22 Suva
- Tailevu 10-6 Naitasiri
- Tailevu 21-12 Ovalau
- Nadroga 31-27 Tailevu
- Nadroga 74-3 Vatukoula
- Nadroga 69-10 Namosi
- Nadroga 30-24 Northland
- Nadroga 41-8 Navosa

2006

- 11/11 Nadroga 27-24 Ovalau
- 04/11 Naitasiri 10-18 Nadroga°
- 28/10 Naitasiri 20-8 Suva
- 21/10 Naitasiri 28-25 Nadi
- 14/10 Naitasiri 22-6 Lautoka
- 07/10 Naitasiri 18-11 Navosa
- 09/09 Naitasiri 29-11 Tailevu

2005

- Suva 8-13 Naitasiri°
- Suva 19-18 Nadi
- Nadroga 21-29 Suva°
- Nadroga 25-18 Lautoka
- Nadroga 95-8 Tavua

2004

- 27/11 Nadroga 13-5 Naitasiri
- 20/11 Nadroga 15-9 Suva
- 30/10 Nadroga 15-9 Lautoka
- 23/10 Nadi 13 Nadroga 49
- 09/10 Tailevu 18-34 Nadi°
- 21/08 Tailevu 33-12 Vatukoula
- 24/07 Tailevu 23-12 Namosi
- 26/06 Tailevu 25-20 Navosa

2003

- 11/10 Lautoka 14-19 Tailevu°
- 04/10 Lautoka 19--15 Nadroga
- 27/09 Lautoka 16-14 Suva
- 02/08 Lautoka 25-5 Nadi
- 26/07 Naitasiri 13-18 Lautoka°
- 19/07 Naitasiri 18-17 Navosa
- 12/07 Naitasiri 27-21 Namosi
- 28/06 Naitasiri 15-6 Ovalau

2002

- 14/09 Naitasiri 23-9 Suva
- 28/09 Naitasiri 12-6 Nadroga
- 14/09 Nadi 13-28 Naitasiri°
- 31/08 Nadi 11-9 Tailevu
- 24/08 Namosi 10-27 Nadi°
- 17/08 Ovalau 9-14 Namosi°
- 03/08 Ovalau 12-9 Rewa
- 15/06 Lautoka 13-17 Ovalau°

2001

- 24/11 Lautoka 15-0 Nadroga
- 17/11 Lautoka 17-6 Suva
- 10/11 Lautoka 10-10 Naitasiri
- 03/11 Nadi 12-15 Lautoka °
- 27/10 Nadi 17-16 Tailevu
- 20/10 Nadi 33-13 Ovalau

2000

- 11/11 Nadi 9-3 Suva
- 04/11 Nadi 11-11 Nadroga
- 28/10 Naitasiri 8-9 Nadi°
- 21/10 Naitasiri 31-10 Ovalau
- 30/09 Naitasiri 9-3 Lautoka
- 16/09 Naitasiri 15-13 Tailevu
- 05/08 Naitasiri 30-12 Namosi

1999

- 16/10 Naitasiri 18–10 Nadroga
- 25/09 Naitasiri 37–3 Vatukoula
- 11/09 Naitasiri 25–20 Lautoka
- 28/08 Nadi 5–10 Naitasiri°
- 14/08 Nadi 27–15 Suva
- 31/07 Nadi 15–10 Tailevu
- 17/07 Nadi 35–0 Ra
- 12/06 Nadi 17–13 Namosi

1998

- 24/10 Suva 31–34 Nadi°
- 10/10 Naitasiri 14–24 Suva°
- 12/09 Naitasiri 40–8 Ra (B Division)
- 22/08 Naitasiri 12–8 Tailevu
- 08/08 Naitasiri 51–13 Macuata
- 11/07 Nadroga 18–25 Naitasiri°
- 20/06 Nadroga 39–6 Lautoka

1997

- 18/10 Nadroga 37–15 Suva
- 11/10 Nadroga 34–19 Namosi
- 27/09 Nadroga 23–14 Nadi
- 06/09 Nadroga 23–15 Lautoka
- 23/08 Nadroga 23–14 Naitasiri North
- 09/08 Nadroga 22–13 Tavua
- 19/07 Nadroga 15–11 Tailevu

1996

- 26/10 Nadroga 27–10 Suva
- 05/10 Nadroga 48–10 Lautoka
- 21/09 Nadroga 57–24 Vatukoula
- 14/09 Nadroga 45–8 Macuata
- 07/09 Nadroga 19–10 Nadi
- 17/08 Nadroga 63–0 Rewa
- 13/07 Nadroga 29–6 Burebesaga

1995

- 07/10 Nadi 11-18 Nadroga°
- 30/09 Nadi 11–6 Suva
- 16/09 Nadi 22-3 Tavua (B Division)
- 09/09 Nadi 32–19 Rewa
- 26/08 Nadi 27–16 Lautoka
- 19/08 Nadi 31–5 Vatukoula
- 22/07 Nadi 10–6 Naitasiri North

1994

- 15/10 Nadi 18–8 Nadroga
- 08/10 Nadi 22–12 Suva
- 01/10 Nadi 32–16 Lautoka
- 24/09 Nadi 21–16 Rewa
- 10/09 Nadi 36–3 Burebasaga
- 03/09 Nadi 28–8 Vatukoula
- 06/09 Nadi 31–13 Naitasiri North
- 11/06 Nadi 38–18 Ba

1993

- 16/10 Nadi 14–5 Rewa
- 02/10 Suva 17–29 Nadi°
- 09/10 Suva 21–21 Nadroga
- 11/09 Suva 5–5 Vatukoula
- 14/08 Suva 20–3 Ba
- 07/08 Suva 28–16 Lautoka
- 24/07 Suva 38–11 Namosi
- 03/07 Suva 15–7 Naitasiri North

1992

- 10/10 Suva 46–3 Lautoka
- 03/10 Nadroga 8–25 Suva°
- 26/09 Nadroga – Rewa
- 12/09 Nadroga 67–3 Tailevu
- 22/08 Nadi 9–10 Nadroga°
- 08/08 Nadi 20–6 Naitasiri North
- 18/07 Nadi 18–9 Serua Namosi
- 27/06 Nadi 41–3 Ba

1991

- 07/09 Nadi 23–7 Tavua
- 03/08 Nadi 17–0 Naitasiri North
- 13/07 Nadi 6–3 Rewa
- 29/06 Suva 15–20 Nadi°
- 22/06 Suva 23–13 Nadroga
- 15/06 Suva 15–6 Lautoka
- 25/05 Suva 19–7 Namosi
- 27/04 Suva 35–3 Ba

1990

- 13/10 Suva 17–6 Rewa
- 29/09 Suva 33–6 Cakaudrove
- 15/09 Suva 23–10 Nadi
- 01/09 Suva 14–3 Naitasiri North
- 25/08 Suva 13–7 Nadroga
- 18/08 Suva 10–10 Lautoka
- 04/08 Suva 39–6 Ba
- 28/07 Suva 29–6 Namosi

1989

- 09/09 Suva 20–9 Rewa
- 02/09 Suva 67–4 Ra (B Division)
- 26/08 Suva 24–10 Nadi
- 19/08 Suva 36–3 Naitasiri North
- 05/08 Suva 37–4 Nadroga
- 24/06 Suva 71–3 Lautoka
- 03/06 Suva 18–6 Serua Namosi

1988

- 01/10 Suva 21–6 Nadroga
- 24/09 Suva 34–6 Ba/Tavua
- 10/09 Nadi 4–15 Suva°
- 27/08 Nadi 20–6 Rewa
- 13/08 Nadi 22–6 Lautoka
- 16/06 Nadi 9–7 Naitasiri North

1987

- 17/10 Nadi 23–13 Vatukoula
- 03/10 Nadi 19–13 Suva
- 26/00 Nadi 19–9 Nadroga
- 05/09 Nadi 28–9 Rewa
- 01/08 Nadi 24–12 Lautoka

1986

- 04/10 Nadi 7–3 Nadroga
- 13/09 Nadi 15–0 Burebasaga
- 23/08 Nadi 15–7 Suva
- 26/07 Nadi 10–8 Lautoka
- 07/06 Nadi 7–7 Rewa

1985

- 07/09 Nadi 14–13 Suva
- 28/08 Nadi 16–8 Nadroga
- 03/08 Nadi 12–0 Lautoka
- 22/06 Nadi 10–9 Rewa

1984

- 01/09 Nadi 15–10 Nadroga
- 11/08 Nadi 15–0 Suva

1983

- 01/10 Nadroga 9–12 Nadi°
- 06/08 Nadroga 13–12 Suva
- 23/07 Nadroga 23–4 Rewa
- 02/07 Nadroga 13–3 Lautoka

1982

- 04/09 Nadroga 15–8 Nadi
- 07/08 Nadroga 6–6 Suva
- 24/07 Nadroga 13–12 Rewa
- 19/06 Nadroga 17–6 Naitasiri North

1981

- 10/10 Nadi 4–7 Nadroga°
- 06/06 Nadi 20–6 Lautoka

1980

- 04/10 Nadi 22–7 Nadroga
- 20/09 Nadi 24–0 Suva
- 28/06 Nadi 17–12 Lautoka

1979

- 06/10 Lautoka 12–15 Nadi°
- 29/09 Nadroga 4–6 Lautoka°
- 22/09 Nadroga 22–3 Suva
- 11/08 Nadroga 28–10 Rewa

1978

- 07/10 Nadroga 18–9 Suva
- 23/09 Nadroga 12–6 Lautoka
- 02/09 Nadroga 14–4 Rewa
- 26/08 Nadroga 16–0 Nadi

1977

- 15/10 Nadroga 10–6 Nadi
- 01/10 Nadroga 14–6 Suva
- 24/09 Nadroga 25–25 Rewa
- 27/08 Nadroga 24–12 Lautoka

1976

- 09/10 Nadroga 18–9 Suva
- 02/10 Nadroga 9–3 Rewa
- 18/09 Nadroga 9–7 Nadi

1975

- 27/09 Nadroga 9–4 Rewa
- 15/09 Nadroga 15–0 Nadi
- 09/08 Nadroga 8–0 Suva
- 05/07 Nadroga 11–6 Lautoka

1974

- 28/09 Nadroga 6–3 Nadi
- 29/06 Nadroga 14–0 Suva
- 25/05 Nadroga 22–3 Rewa

1973

- 28/07 Nadroga 40–7 Suva
- 29/07 Nadroga 24–3 Labasa

1972

- Nadroga

1971

- 25/09 Nadroga 38–3 Rewa
- 21/08 Nadi 3–12 Nadroga°
- 24/07 Nadi 23–11 Suva
- 12/06 Nadi 34–14 Lautoka

1970

- Nadi

1969

- Nadi

1968

- Nadi bat Suva

1967

- 16/09 Suva 36–3 Tavua
- 02/09 Suva 20–3 Vatukoula

1966

- Suva 16–11 Rewa
- Suva 50–0 Wainibuka
- Suva 16–6 Nadi
- Lautoka 6–19 Suva°

1965

- Lautoka 6–19 Suva
- Lautoka 14–3 Rewa
- Lautoka 14–14 Vatukoula
- Nadroga 0–5 Lautoka°

1964

- 01/08 Nadroga 18–5 Suva
- 18/07 Lautoka 3–14 Nadroga°
- 06/06 Nadi 3–6 Lautoka°

1963

- Nadi beats Suva

1962

- Suva

1961

- Suva

1960

- Suva

1959

- Suva beats Nadi

1958

- Nadi 23–3 Suva
- Nadi beats Nadroga

1957

- Nadroga beats Suva

1956

- Suva

1955

- Suva

1954

- Suva

1953

- Suva

1952

- Suva bat Northern Districts

1951

- Northern Districts bat Suva

1950

- Suva

1949

- Suva

1948

- Suva

1947

- Suva

1946

- Suva

1945

- Suva

1944

- Suva

1943

- Suva

1942

- Suva

1941

- Suva

== Statistics ==
As of 23 September 2008

== Title winners ==
8 Nadi

74 Suva

68 Nadroga

18 Naitasiri

14 Lautoka

11 Tailevu

2 Ovalau

1 Northern Districts

1 Namosi
