= Wame Lewaravu =

Fijian rugby union player (born 1983)

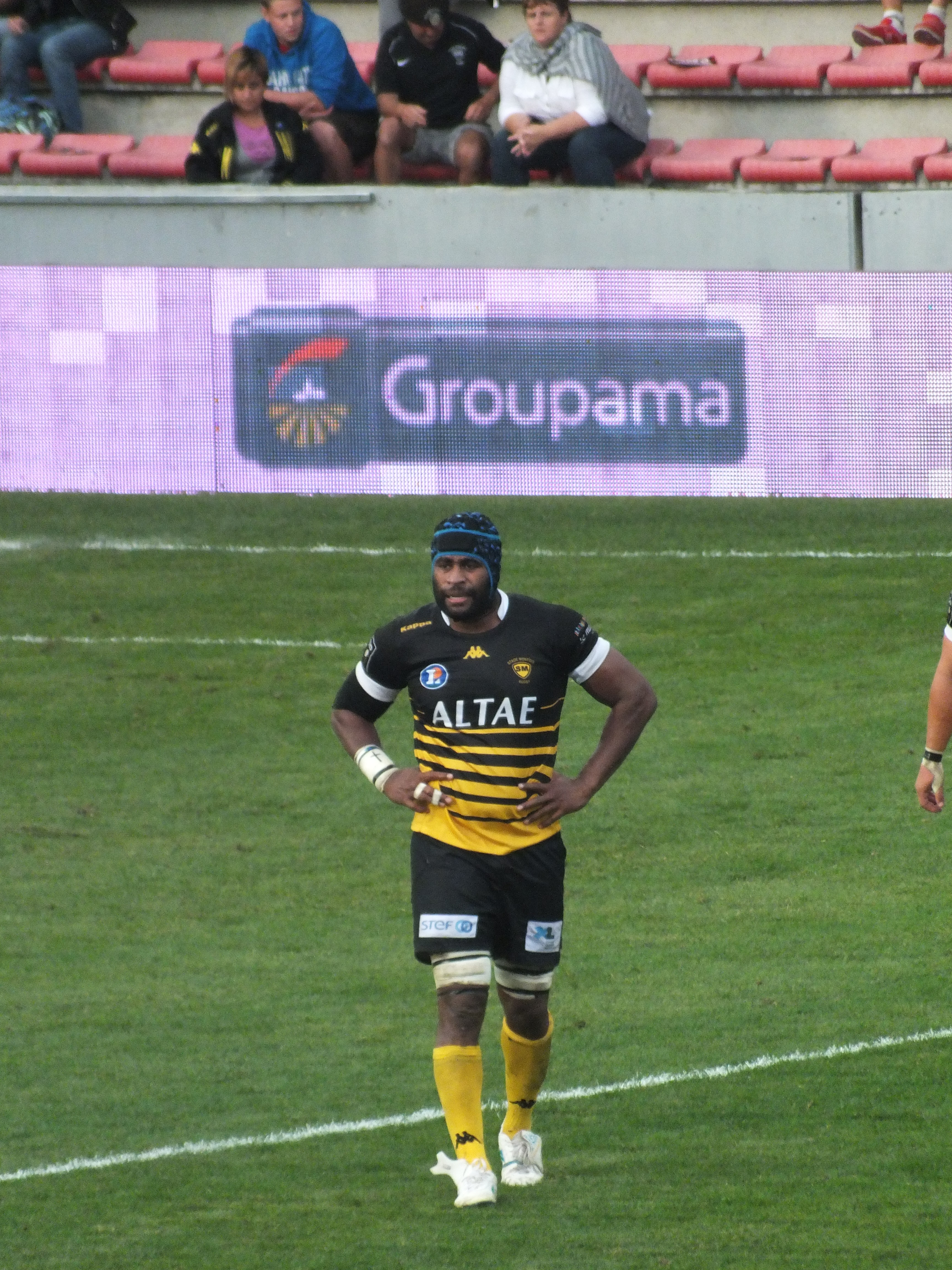
- Lewaravu in action for Stade Montois in 2012.
- Born: Ratu Wame Ganilau Lewaravu; 24 September 1983 (age 43) Lautoka, Fiji
- Height: 1.96 m (6 ft 5 in)
- Weight: 114 kg (17 st 13 lb)

Rugby union career
- Position: Lock
Senior career
| Years | Team | Apps | (Points) |
| 2005–2006 | Highlanders | | |
| 2006 | Fiji Warriors | | |
| 2007 | Coastal Stallions | | |
| 2007 | Fiji Barbarians | | |
| 2007–2009 | London Welsh | | |
| 2009−2010 | Parma | 19 | (5) |
| 2010–2012 | Sale Sharks | 26 | (25) |
| 2011 | London Welsh (loan) | 3 | (0) |
| 2012-2014 | Stade Montois | 34 | (10) |
| 2014-16 | Colomiers | 18 | (0) |
- Correct as of 27 December 2019
International career
| Years | Team | Apps | (Points) |
| 2007– | Fiji | 26 | (0) |
- Correct as of 22 June 2014

Ratu Wame Ganilau Lewaravu (born 24 September 1983, in Lautoka) is a Fijian rugby union player. He plays as a lock.

== Career ==
Early career

Lewaravu attended Suva Grammar school in Fiji and won the Deans trophy in 2001 with the schools 1st XV.

He played for Naitasiri club in Fiji's domestic league Digicel Cup in 2004. After which he was selected for the Suva Highlanders in the inaugural Colonial Cup in 2006, Fiji first attempt at a fully fledged professional competition.

After impressive performances for Suva Highlanders, Lewaravu was selected for the Flying Fijians in the 2007 for the Pacific Nations Cup

=== Club ===
He currently plays for Sale Sharks having previously played for Overmach Parma and London Welsh.

=== Debut ===
His first match for Fiji was on 19 May 2007, in a 3–8 loss to rivals Samoa.

=== World Cup 2007 ===
Lewaravu was selected for the 2007 Rugby World Cup finals, playing in four matches. His more recent match was at 14 June 2008, in a 7–11 loss to New Zealand Māori. He currently holds 12 caps for Fiji.
