= Filimoni Bolavucu =

Fijian rugby union player

- Born: Filimoni Vakaloloma Bolavucu; 13 February 1981 (age 45) Suva, Fiji
- Height: 1.72 m (5 ft 8 in)
- Weight: 90 kg (14 st 2 lb; 200 lb)

Rugby union career
- Position: Wing
Senior career
Years	Team	Apps	(Points)
2000-01	Suva		
2003-04	Waikato	6	(15)
2005	Bay of Plenty	4	(0)
2005	Highlanders	6	(5)
2006	Fiji Warriors	1	(0)
2006-08	Brive	28	(45)
2008-10	Bayonne	37	(40)
2010 -	Dax		
International career
Years	Team	Apps	(Points)
2007–09	Fiji	3	(10)
National sevens team
Years	Team		Comps
2002–2006	Fiji		15
Medal record
Men's rugby sevens
Representing Fiji
Commonwealth Games
Bronze medal – third place	2006 Melbourne	Team competition

Filimoni Vakalololma Bolavucu (born 13 February 1981 in Suva) is a Fijian rugby union player, who currently plays for Dax in Pro D2. He plays as a wing. He played for the Suva Highlanders in the Colonial Cup. He also played for Lomaiviti in the local tournaments. He has played in the Top 14 competition in France representing Brive and Bayonne.

== Biography ==
He played for the Lomaiviti in the Suva club competition and represented Suva Colts in 2000 and 2001. His performance in 2002 earned him a place in the senior Suva squad, and he toured with the Fiji Under 21s to South Africa, playing in all five of Fiji's games.

As a 21-year-old, he represented Suva in the Sullivan-Farebrother 2002 challenge when they so nearly dethroned Naitasiri, and for Veiyanuyanu in the State of Origin match. Possessing much promise, Bolavucu attended both sets of national trials at Prince Charles Park in 2002 but did not quite break through to the Test side.

He made his Fiji 7s debut at the end of 2002, and was in the winning team at the 2002 South Africa 7s. His performances with the Fiji 7s team in 2003, however, won him a contract with Waikato for the NPC competition where he scored a try in the semi-final loss to Wellington.

After three years of provincial rugby in New Zealand, Bolavucu landed a job with French club Brive alongside Test fullback Norman Ligairi.

He was a key member of the Digicel Fiji 7s team of 2006.

Bolavucu made his Test debut for Fiji in 2007 against Australia A in their final game of the 2007 Pacific Nations Cup, Bolavucu scored two long range tries bringing Fiji to a 14 – 14 draw, the closest any of the 3 island nations came to beating Australia A in the Pacific Nations Cup.

After this performance he was selected for the 2007 Rugby World Cup, as one of three wingers ahead of stars Sireli Bobo and Rupeni Caucau, however he was ruled out due to injury without making an appearance and was replaced by Bobo.

He signed to play for Dax for the 10/11 season.
