= Aisake =

Aisake is a Melanesian name. Notable people with this name include:

- Aisake Nadolo (1964–2009), Fijian rugby union player
- Aisake Tarogi (born 1981), Fijian rugby union player
- Aisake Ó hAilpín (born 1985), Fijian-Irish sportsperson
- Lusiano Aisake, king of Uvea
- ʻAisake Eke, Tongan politician
