= 2008 Hong Kong Sevens =

International rugby sevens tournament

The Hong Kong Sevens is contested annually as part of the IRB Sevens World Series for international rugby sevens (seven-a-side version of rugby union). The 2008 competition, which took place between March 28 and March 30 in Hong Kong, was the fifth Cup trophy in the 2007–08 IRB Sevens World Series and was won by New Zealand. The winners extended their all-time IRB Sevens record for consecutive match wins to 42 while claiming their fifth Cup win of the season and seventh in a row overall.

== Pool stages ==
=== Pool A ===
Pos	Team	Pld	W	D	L	PF	PA	PD	Pts
1	New Zealand	3	3	0	0	135	12	+123	9
2	United States	3	2	0	1	71	85	−14	7
3	Tunisia	3	1	0	2	87	69	+18	5
4	Chinese Taipei	3	0	0	3	27	154	−127	3

Date	Team 1	Score	Team 2
March 28, 2008	United States	26 - 21	Tunisia
March 28, 2008	New Zealand	50 - 5	Chinese Taipei
March 29, 2008	United States	38 - 17	Chinese Taipei
March 29, 2008	New Zealand	38 - 0	Tunisia
March 29, 2008	Tunisia	66 - 5	Chinese Taipei
March 29, 2008	New Zealand	47 - 7	United States

=== Pool B ===
Pos	Team	Pld	W	D	L	PF	PA	PD	Pts
1	England	3	3	0	0	78	24	+54	9
2	Samoa	3	2	0	1	76	26	+50	7
3	Canada	3	1	0	2	77	60	+17	5
4	Sri Lanka	3	0	0	3	14	135	−121	3

Date	Team 1	Score	Team 2
March 28, 2008	Samoa	35 - 7	Sri Lanka
March 28, 2008	England	24 - 12	Canada
March 29, 2008	England	47 - 7	Sri Lanka
March 29, 2008	Samoa	36 - 12	Canada
March 29, 2008	Canada	53 - 0	Sri Lanka
March 29, 2008	Samoa	5 - 7	England

=== Pool C ===
Pos	Team	Pld	W	D	L	PF	PA	PD	Pts
1	South Africa	3	3	0	0	107	21	+86	9
2	Argentina	3	2	0	1	66	24	+42	7
3	Russia	3	1	0	2	24	93	−69	5
4	Japan	3	0	0	3	24	83	−59	3

Date	Team 1	Score	Team 2
March 28, 2008	South Africa	40 - 7	Japan
March 28, 2008	Argentina	33 - 0	Russia
March 29, 2008	Argentina	19 - 5	Japan
March 29, 2008	South Africa	48 - 0	Russia
March 29, 2008	Russia	24 - 12	Japan
March 29, 2008	South Africa	19 - 14	Argentina

=== Pool D ===
Pos	Team	Pld	W	D	L	PF	PA	PD	Pts
1	Fiji	3	3	0	0	99	21	+78	9
2	Wales	3	2	0	1	68	20	+48	7
3	Zimbabwe	3	1	0	2	35	81	−46	5
4	South Korea	3	0	0	3	17	97	−80	3

Date	Team 1	Score	Team 2
March 28, 2008	Fiji	42 - 7	South Korea
March 28, 2008	Wales	34 - 0	Zimbabwe
March 29, 2008	Wales	34 - 5	South Korea
March 29, 2008	Fiji	42 - 14	Zimbabwe
March 29, 2008	Zimbabwe	21 - 5	South Korea
March 29, 2008	Fiji	15 - 0	Wales

=== Pool E ===
Pos	Team	Pld	W	D	L	PF	PA	PD	Pts
1	Kenya	3	3	0	0	85	14	+71	9
2	Portugal	3	1	0	2	57	55	+2	5
3	Scotland	3	1	0	2	45	48	−3	5
4	China	3	1	0	2	29	99	−70	5

Date	Team 1	Score	Team 2
March 28, 2008	Kenya	47 - 0	China
March 28, 2008	Scotland	26 - 10	Portugal
March 29, 2008	Scotland	12 - 19	China
March 29, 2008	Kenya	19 - 7	Portugal
March 29, 2008	Portugal	40 - 10	China
March 29, 2008	Kenya	19 - 7	Scotland

=== Pool F ===
Pos	Team	Pld	W	D	L	PF	PA	PD	Pts
1	Australia	3	3	0	0	58	39	+19	9
2	France	3	1	1	1	54	45	+9	6
3	Tonga	3	1	0	2	78	43	+35	5
4	Hong Kong	3	0	1	2	38	101	−63	4

Date	Team 1	Score	Team 2
March 28, 2008	Australia	24 - 12	Hong Kong
March 28, 2008	Tonga	7 - 21	France
March 29, 2008	Tonga	56 - 5	Hong Kong
March 29, 2008	Australia	17 - 12	France
March 29, 2008	France	21 - 21	Hong Kong
March 29, 2008	Australia	17 - 15	Tonga

== Knockout ==
=== Bowl ===
Quarter-finals
March 30 - Hong Kong
Zimbabwe	26
Chinese Taipei	7
March 30 - Hong Kong
Japan	14
Hong Kong	19
March 30 - Hong Kong
China	5
South Korea	12
March 30 - Hong Kong
Sri Lanka	10
Russia	35

Semi-finals
March 30 - Hong Kong
Zimbabwe	35
Hong Kong	7
March 30 - Hong Kong
South Korea	5
Russia	19

Final
March 30 - Hong Kong
Zimbabwe	14
Russia	19

=== Plate ===
Quarter-finals
March 30 - Hong Kong
Argentina	7
Scotland	5
March 30 - Hong Kong
Tonga	26
Portugal	17
March 30 - Hong Kong
France	12
Tunisia	7
March 30 - Hong Kong
Canada	24
United States	21

Semi-finals
March 30 - Hong Kong
Argentina	19
Tonga	12
March 30 - Hong Kong
France	36
Canada	5

Final
March 30 - Hong Kong
Argentina	14
France	17

=== Cup ===
Quarter-finals
March 30 - Hong Kong
New Zealand	26
Wales	7
March 30 - Hong Kong
Kenya	0
Fiji	10
March 30 - Hong Kong
South Africa	19
Australia	14
March 30 - Hong Kong
Samoa	17
England	12

Semi-finals
March 30 - Hong Kong
New Zealand	34
Fiji	0
March 30 - Hong Kong
South Africa	12
Samoa	10

Final
March 30 - Hong Kong
New Zealand	26
South Africa	12

== Sponsors ==
The tournament's co-title sponsors were Cathay Pacific and Credit Suisse.
