= 2008 London Sevens =

The London Sevens is played annually as part of the IRB Sevens World Series for international rugby sevens (seven-a-side version of rugby union). The 2008 competition took place 24 May and 25 May at Twickenham in London, England and was the seventh Cup trophy in the 2007-08 IRB Sevens World Series.

Samoa won their first Cup of the season, defeating Fiji in the final 19-14. In a shock Plate final, New Zealand defeated South Africa 19-12. However, this result was enough to ensure that New Zealand won the overall 2007-08 Series with a round to spare. New Zealand had earlier lost to the hosts England in the Cup quarter-finals, whilst South Africa failed to score against Argentina at the same stage in the tournament. The other main surprise of the tournament was Portugal reaching the Cup competition, partly by defeating Australia in the group stages. Later on in the tournament, Australia managed a consolation victory in the Bowl, whilst Spain won the Shield.

== Pool stages ==
=== Pool A ===
Team	Pld	W	D	L	PF	PA	+/-	Pts
New Zealand	3	3	0	0	72	21	+51	9
Argentina	3	1	1	1	71	38	+33	6
Wales	3	1	1	1	73	52	+21	6
Moldova	3	0	0	3	28	133	-105	3

Date	Team 1	Score	Team 2
2008-05-24	New Zealand	10 - 7	Argentina
2008-05-24	Wales	52 - 7	Moldova
2008-05-24	New Zealand	38 - 14	Moldova
2008-05-24	Wales	21 - 21	Argentina
2008-05-24	Argentina	43 - 7	Moldova
2008-05-24	New Zealand	24 - 0	Wales

=== Pool B ===
Team	Pld	W	D	L	PF	PA	+/-	Pts
South Africa	3	3	0	0	104	12	+92	9
England	3	2	0	1	69	34	+35	7
France	3	1	0	2	36	78	-42	5
Spain	3	0	0	3	17	102	-85	3

Date	Team 1	Score	Team 2
2008-05-24	South Africa	40 - 0	France
2008-05-24	England	29 - 7	Spain
2008-05-24	South Africa	42 - 5	Spain
2008-05-24	England	33 - 5	France
2008-05-24	France	31 - 5	Spain
2008-05-24	South Africa	22 - 7	England

=== Pool C ===
Team	Pld	W	D	L	PF	PA	+/-	Pts
Fiji	3	3	0	0	80	15	+65	9
Portugal	3	2	0	1	45	65	-20	7
Australia	3	1	0	2	60	45	+15	5
Canada	3	0	0	3	24	84	-60	3

Date	Team 1	Score	Team 2
2008-05-24	Fiji	29 - 5	Canada
2008-05-24	Australia	12 - 28	Portugal
2008-05-24	Fiji	39 - 0	Portugal
2008-05-24	Australia	38 - 5	Canada
2008-05-24	Canada	14 - 17	Portugal
2008-05-24	Fiji	12 - 10	Australia

=== Pool D ===
Team	Pld	W	D	L	PF	PA	+/-	Pts
Samoa	3	3	0	0	92	32	+60	9
Scotland	3	2	0	1	60	43	+17	7
Russia	3	1	0	2	34	71	-37	5
Kenya	3	0	0	3	22	62	-40	3

Date	Team 1	Score	Team 2
2008-05-24	Samoa	33 - 10	Russia
2008-05-24	Kenya	5 - 17	Scotland
2008-05-24	Samoa	31 - 12	Scotland
2008-05-24	Kenya	7 - 17	Russia
2008-05-24	Russia	7 - 31	Scotland
2008-05-24	Samoa	28 - 10	Kenya

== Knockout ==
=== Shield ===
Quarter-finals
25 May - London, England
Wales	26
Spain	0
25 May - London, England
Russia	12
Canada	17
25 May - London, England
Australia	17
Kenya	0
25 May - London, England
France	24
Moldova	7

Semi-finals
25 May - London, England
Spain	12
Russia	7
25 May - London, England
Kenya	24
Moldova	5

Final
25 May - London, England
Spain	10
Kenya	7

=== Bowl ===
Quarter-finals
25 May - London, England
Wales	26
Spain	0
25 May - London, England
Russia	12
Canada	17
25 May - London, England
Australia	17
Kenya	0
25 May - London, England
France	24
Moldova	7

Semi-finals
25 May - London, England
Wales	31
Canada	0
25 May - London, England
Australia	21
France	7

Final
25 May - London, England
Wales	12
Australia	19

=== Plate ===
Quarter-finals
25 May - London, England
New Zealand	12
England	17
25 May - London, England
Samoa	17
Portugal	7
25 May - London, England
Fiji	19
Scotland	17
25 May - London, England
South Africa	0
Argentina	12

Semi-finals
25 May - London, England
New Zealand	28
Portugal	14
25 May - London, England
Scotland	12
South Africa	19

Final
25 May - London, England
New Zealand	19
South Africa	12

=== Cup ===
Quarter-finals
25 May - London, England
New Zealand	12
England	17
25 May - London, England
Samoa	17
Portugal	7
25 May - London, England
Fiji	19
Scotland	17
25 May - London, England
South Africa	0
Argentina	12

Semi-finals
25 May - London, England
England	12
Samoa	14
25 May - London, England
Fiji	21
Argentina	17

Final
25 May - London, England
Samoa	19
Fiji	14
