= 2007–08 IRB Sevens World Series =

Rugby sevens tournaments

2007–08 IRB Sevens
- Series IX
- Hosts: United Arab Emirates; South Africa; New Zealand; United States; Hong Kong; Australia; England; Scotland
- Date: 30 November 2007 – 1 June 2008
- Nations: 32

Final positions
- Champions: New Zealand
- Runners-up: South Africa
- Third: Samoa

The 2007–08 IRB Sevens World Series was the ninth of an annual IRB Sevens World Series of rugby sevens tournaments for full national sides run by the International Rugby Board since 1999–2000.

The defending series champions, New Zealand, dominated this season's competition, winning the first five events, setting new records for consecutive tournament wins and consecutive match wins, and clinching the 2007–08 series with one tournament remaining after winning the Plate Final of the London leg. They ended with six wins out of the eight events.

Sevens is traditionally played in a two-day tournament format; however, the most famous event, the Hong Kong Sevens, is played over three days.

== Tournaments ==
The series' tournaments, which were identical to those in 2006–2007, span the globe:

2007-08 Itinerary
Leg	Venue	Date	Winner
Dubai	Dubai Exiles Rugby Ground	Nov 30–Dec 1, 2007	New Zealand
South Africa	Outeniqua Park, George	December 7–8 2007	New Zealand
New Zealand	Westpac Stadium, Wellington	February 1–2 2008	New Zealand
United States	Petco Park, San Diego	February 9–10 2008	New Zealand
Hong Kong	Hong Kong Stadium	March 28–30 2008	New Zealand
Australia	Adelaide Oval, Adelaide	April 5–6 2008	South Africa
London	Twickenham	May 24–25 2008	Samoa
Scotland	Murrayfield, Edinburgh	May 31–June 1, 2008	New Zealand

== Tournament structure ==
In all tournaments except Hong Kong, 16 teams participate. Because of its place as the sports most prestigious annual event, the Hong Kong tournament as 24 teams. In each tournament, the teams are divided into pools of four teams, who play a round-robin within the pool. Points are awarded in each pool on a different schedule from most rugby tournaments—3 for a win, 2 for a draw, 1 for a loss. The first tiebreaker is the head-to-head result between the tied teams, followed by difference in points scored during the tournament.

Four trophies are awarded in each tournament, except for Hong Kong. In descending order of prestige, they are the Cup, whose winner is the overall tournament champion, Plate, Bowl and Shield. In Hong Kong, the Shield is not awarded. Each trophy is awarded at the end of a knockout tournament.

In a 16 team tournament, the top two teams in each pool advance to the Cup competition. The four quarterfinal losers drop into the bracket for the Plate. The Bowl is contested by the third-place finishers in each pool, while the Shield is contested by the last-place teams from each pool. In Hong Kong, the six pool winners, plus the two highest-finishing second-place teams, advance to the Cup. The Plate participants are the eight highest-ranked teams remaining, while the lowest eight drop to the Bowl.

== Points schedule ==
The season championship is determined by points earned in each tournament. For most events, points are awarded on the following schedule:

- Cup winner (1st place): 20 points
- Cup runner-up (2nd place): 16 points
- Losing Cup semifinalists (3rd & 4th place): 12 points
- Plate winner (5th place): 8 points
- Plate runner-up (6th place): 6 points
- Losing Plate semifinalists (7th & 8th place): 4 points
- Bowl winner (9th place): 2 points

Points are awarded on a different schedule for the Hong Kong Sevens:

- Cup winner (1st place): 30 points
- Cup runner-up (2nd place): 24 points
- Losing Cup semifinalists (3rd & 4th place): 18 points
- Losing Cup quarterfinalists (5th, 6th, 7th & 8th place): 8 points
- Plate winner (9th place): 4 points
- Plate runner-up (10th place): 3 points
- Losing Plate semifinalists (11th & 12th place): 2 points
- Bowl winner (17th place): 1 point

== Final standings ==
The points awarded to teams at each event, as well as the overall season totals, are shown in the table below. Gold indicates the event champions. Silver indicates the event runner-ups. A zero (0) is recorded in the event column where a team competed in a tournament but did not gain any points. A dash (–) is recorded in the event column if a team did not compete at a tournament.

2007–08 IRB Sevens – Series IX
Pos.	Event Team	Dubai	George	Wellington	San Diego	Hong Kong	Adelaide	London	Edinburgh	Points total
1	New Zealand	20	20	20	20	30	16	8	20	154
2	South Africa	12	12	8	16	24	20	6	8	106
3	Samoa	6	4	16	12	18	12	20	12	100
4	Fiji	16	16	4	8	18	12	16	4	94
5	England	12	0	2	4	8	0	12	16	54
6	Argentina	8	12	0	6	3	2	12	0	43
7	Kenya	4	8	0	12	8	6	0	0	38
8	Australia	2	0	12	0	8	4	2	2	30
9	Wales	0	2	6	2	8	0	0	12	30
10	Scotland	4	4	4	4	0	0	4	6	26
11	Tonga	–	–	12	–	2	8	–	–	22
12	France	0	0	0	0	4	0	0	4	8
13	United States	0	6	0	0	0	0	–	–	6
14	Portugal	–	–	–	–	0	–	4	0	4
14	Cook Islands	–	–	0	–	–	4	–	–	4
16	Canada	0	0	0	0	2	0	0	0	2
17	Russia	–	–	–	–	1	–	0	0	1
N/A	Moldova	–	–	–	–	–	–	0	0	0
N/A	Spain	–	–	–	–	–	–	0	0	0
N/A	Japan	–	–	–	–	0	0	–	–	0
N/A	Zimbabwe	0	0	–	–	0	–	–	–	0
N/A	Tunisia	0	0	–	–	0	–	–	–	0
N/A	Hong Kong	–	–	–	–	0	–	–	–	0
N/A	China	–	–	–	–	0	–	–	–	0
N/A	Chinese Taipei	–	–	–	–	0	–	–	–	0
N/A	South Korea	–	–	–	–	0	–	–	–	0
N/A	Sri Lanka	–	–	–	–	0	–	–	–	0
N/A	West Indies	–	–	–	0	–	–	–	–	0
N/A	Chile	–	–	–	0	–	–	–	–	0
N/A	Mexico	–	–	–	0	–	–	–	–	0
N/A	Papua New Guinea	–	–	0	–	–	–	–	–	0
N/A	Uganda	–	0	–	–	–	–	–	–	0
N/A	(Cooperation Council for the Arab States of the Gulf) Arabian Gulf	0	–	–	–	–	–	–	–	0

Source: world.rugby (archived)

Legend
Gold	Event Champions
Silver	Event Runner-ups
Light blue line on the left indicates a core team eligible to participate in all events of the series.

== Player scoring ==
=== Individual points ===
Individual points Updated:2008-04-04
Pos.	Player	Country	Points
1	Tomasi Cama	New Zealand	188
2	Fabian Juries	South Africa	150
3	Neumi Nanuku	Fiji	146
4	Renfred Dazel	South Africa	137
5	Lote Raikabula	New Zealand	136
6	Steven Yates	New Zealand	130
7=	Mikaele Pesamino	Samoa	127
7=	Emosi Vucago	Fiji	127
9	Philip Mack	Canada	126
10	Ben Gollings	England	124

=== Individual tries ===
Individual tries Updated:2012-02-01
Pos.	Player	Country	Points
1	Fabian Juries	South Africa	41
2	Alafoti Fa'osiliva	Samoa	35
3	Mikaele Pesamino	Samoa	31
4	Tomasi Cama	New Zealand	29
5=	Steven Yates	New Zealand	27
5=	Victor Vito	New Zealand	27
5=	Santiago Gomez Cora	Argentina	27
8=	Chris Wyles	United States	26
8=	DJ Forbes	New Zealand	26
10	Emosi Vucago	Fiji	25

== Tournaments ==
=== Dubai ===
Event	Winners	Score	Finalists	Semi Finalists
Cup	New Zealand	31-21	Fiji	South Africa; England
Plate	Argentina	15-14	Samoa	Scotland; Kenya
Bowl	Australia	31 – 0	Canada	France; Wales
Shield	Zimbabwe	22 – 19	Tunisia	Arabian Gulf; United States

=== South Africa ===
Event	Winners	Score	Finalists	Semi Finalists
Cup	New Zealand	34 – 7	Fiji	South Africa; Argentina
Plate	Kenya	15 – 14	United States	Scotland; Samoa
Bowl	Wales	21 – 19	England	Australia; France
Shield	Canada	31 – 14	Zimbabwe	Uganda; Tunisia

=== New Zealand ===
Event	Winners	Score	Finalists	Semi Finalists
Cup	New Zealand	22 – 7	Samoa	Australia; Tonga
Plate	South Africa	19 – 12	Wales	Scotland; Fiji
Bowl	England	12 – 7	Argentina	France; Cook Islands
Shield	United States	22 – 17	Kenya	Canada; Papua New Guinea

=== United States ===
Event	Winners	Score	Finalists	Semi Finalists
Cup	New Zealand	27 – 12	South Africa	Kenya; Samoa
Plate	Fiji	26 – 21	Argentina	England; Scotland
Bowl	Wales	21 – 19	United States	Canada; France
Shield	Australia	24 – 12	Chile	Mexico; West Indies

=== Hong Kong ===
Event	Winners	Score	Finalists	Semi Finalists	Quarter Finalists
Cup	New Zealand	26 – 12	South Africa	Samoa; Fiji	Wales; Australia; Kenya; England
Plate	France	17 – 14	Argentina	Tonga; Canada	Scotland; Portugal; Tunisia; United States
Bowl	Russia	19 – 14	Zimbabwe	Hong Kong; South Korea	Chinese Taipei; Japan; China; Sri Lanka

=== Australia ===
Event	Winners	Score	Finalists	Semi Finalists
Cup	South Africa	15 – 7	New Zealand	Fiji; Samoa
Plate	Tonga	14 – 12	Kenya	Australia; Cook Islands
Bowl	Argentina	26 – 21	United States	Scotland; France
Shield	Wales	12 – 7	Canada	England; Japan

=== London ===
Event	Winners	Score	Finalists	Semi Finalists
Cup	Samoa	19 – 14	Fiji	England; Argentina
Plate	New Zealand	19 – 12	South Africa	Portugal; Scotland
Bowl	Australia	19 – 12	Wales	Canada; France
Shield	Spain	10 – 7	Kenya	Russia; Moldova

=== Scotland ===
Event	Winners	Score	Finalists	Semi Finalists
Cup	New Zealand	24 – 14	England	Samoa; Wales
Plate	South Africa	14 – 5	Scotland	Fiji; France
Bowl	Australia	24 – 14	Canada	Spain; Argentina
Shield	Portugal	10 – 5	Russia	Moldova; Kenya
