= Pio Bosco Tikoisuva =

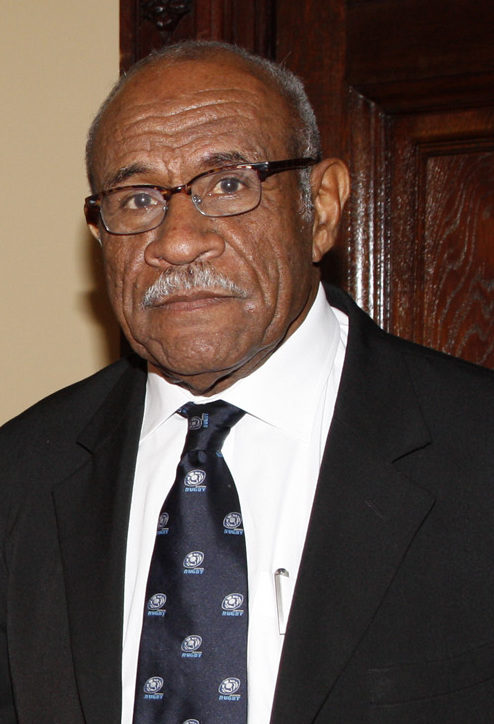
Pio Bosco Tikoisuva in 2010

Pio Bosco Tikoisuva (born 1947 in Taveuni) is a Fijian former rugby union footballer and diplomat.

== Rugby career ==
Tikoisuva played 19 tests for Fiji between 1968 and 1979.

Tikoisiva won his first Test cap in 1968 against Tonga. As he was aged 21, the Fijian selectors had decided that Tikoisuva was too young for Test rugby, and they omitted him from the first Test of the series. After Tonga won 8-6, he was added to the side, and Fiji went on to win the series 2 -1, with a 12-10 victory in Lautoka and a 13-9 win in Suva.

After a lengthy tour to New Zealand, where Tikoisuva played in the 9-9 draw with the Maoris, in 1970 Fiji side then toured England for the first time in a 13-match tour. It was extended to 14 matches to allow a match against a Wales "Under 25" team. Fiji did not have much success in the early matches of the tour. They had a better result when played the traditional tour-ending match against the Barbarians.

As a result of Tikoisuva’s performance on that tour he was recruited to Harlequins.

While playing with Harlequins, he was invited to play for the Barbarians again, against Leicester, an East Midlands team and France.

On his return to Fiji in 1977, Tikoisuva captained the national team, first to a 3-0 series win over Tonga, then to a 25-21 win over the British Lions.

In 1978, Tikoisuva became manager and coach of the Fiji team to the Hong Kong 7s, where Fiji won for the second time in a row.

Tikoisuva retired from international rugby in 1979, playing his last match for Fiji against England in Suva, but continued to play for club rugby for the St John Marist team until the mid-1980s.

In December 2001 he was appointed the first professional CEO of the Fiji Rugby Union where he worked alongside Charlie Charters who was Deputy CEO and Marketing Director.

In December 2021 he published Emperor Bosco, an autobiography.

== Diplomatic career ==
In March 2008, Bosco was appointed as His Excellency The High Commissioner for Fiji in London.
