= Levuka F.C. =

Fijian football club

- Full name: Levuka Football Club
- Founded: 1938
- Ground: Nasau Park; Levuka, Fiji
- Capacity: 1,000
Home colours

Levuka F.C. was a Fijian football team playing in the second division of the Fiji Football Association competitions. It is based in Levuka, which is the only town on Ovalau Island, in the Fiji group. Their home stadium is Nasau Park.

Their uniform includes blue and white striped shirt.

== History ==
Since Levuka was the first permanent European settlement in Fiji, football was undoubtedly first played in Levuka. Fijian teams started playing competitive football in 1904 when the first Fijian Inter-District Tournament was played at Nasau Park, Levuka, during celebrations marking the golden jubilee of Cession. Teams played for the Ricarnie Cup which was won by the Sawani team from Naitasiri. The following year, Bau FC won the cup. Players played the game barefoot and relied on speed and stamina. Other teams to compete in the tournament were Shamrock from Suva, Kadavu FC (from Suva), Lomaiviti FC (from Suva) and Ovalau FC (from Levuka)

In 1934 Levuka hosted the Ricarnie Cup final between Kandavu and Lomaiviti at the Levuka Showground. Kandavu won 3 - 1.

Levuka had an organised local competition in 1932 and these clubs formed the Levuka Indian Soccer Association in 1938, under the presidency of Krishna Franklin. Levuka was one of the founding members of the Fiji Indian Football Association in Suva in 1938. In 1943, Levuka hosted the Inter-District Competition for the only time.

Levuka F.C. has not, over the years, performed as well as other teams and in recent times has struggled to field teams in national competitions.

== Achievements ==
- Senior League (for Districts) - Second Tier: 1

Winner: 1991

== See also ==
- Fiji Football Association

== Bibliography ==
- M. Prasad, Sixty Years of Soccer in Fiji 1938 – 1998: The Official History of the Fiji Football Association, Fiji Football Association, Suva, 1998.
