= Fiji Sports Council =

Agency overview
- Formed: 1978
- Headquarters: Suva, Fiji
- Agency executive: Gilbert Vakalalabure, Acting Chief Executive Officer & Board Chairman Fiji Sports Council
- Parent department: Ministry of Youth and Sports
- Website: fijisportscouncil.com.fj

The Fiji Sports Council is an organisation that is the custodian of all Fiji Government owned sporting venues around the country. Fiji Sports Council is tasked to manage, maintain and upkeep all facilities under its area of responsibilities. The Fiji Sports Council is self funding and does not receive Government funding for its operational expenses. It is also one of the leading providers of quality sports and recreational venues and programmes at national, regional and international levels.

It was established in 1978 under the Fiji Sports Council Act and a year later in 1979 it hosted the first South Pacific Games. It is not affiliated to FASANOC. It was established under an Act of Parliament so has its own rules. The organisation is headed by its Acting Chief Executive Officer Gilbert Vakalalabure, who currently holds the role of Chairman of the Fiji Sports Council Board of Directors.

It also runs an annual Fiji Sports Awards program, recognising athletes, teams, volunteers, technical officials, administrators, and coaches.

== Aims ==
Its main aim is to foster, promote and market the recreational and sporting facilities in Fiji and to also:

- Work with other organizations involved in the business of sports and recreation
- Develop any land or other property as a source of sustainable revenue for the Council and erect and maintain buildings and other structures
- Manage and maintain any land or buildings provided for the purpose of sport and recreation
- Charge fees for admission to land or buildings under its control for maximum number of end users
- Employ and remunerate staff as required at competitive rates
- Train and employ Fiji Sports Council staff according to intellectual capital and requirements to generate wealth
- Generate $4.239 million in 2007 and an increase of 10% thereafter

== Achievements ==
Since its establishment in 1978, it has helped develop sporting centres, and upgrade it to international standards such as:

- HFC Bank Stadium
- Damodar City Aquatic Centre (refurbishing work began May 2022, expected to reopen late 2023)
- National Hockey Centre (refurbishing work began May 2022, expected to reopen late 2023)
- National Fitness Centre

== Funding ==
It mainly funds its organisation by running its own advertising campaign and also collects money through Billboard advertising.
