= Ganilau Park =

Stadium in Savusavu, Fiji

- Interactive map of Ganilau Park
- Address: Savusavu; Fiji
- Coordinates: 16.7698°S 179.3545°E

The Ganilau Park is a stadium in Savusavu, Fiji. The stadium was developed on July 4, 2018. It is the official stadium for the Fijian football club Savusavu FC, with a capacity of 1,120 seats.

== History ==
The stadium was named after the first president of Fiji, Ratu Sir Penaia Ganilau, who was the president from 1987 to 1993.

== Tournaments held ==
The stadium has hosted The 2023 Digicel Senior League promotion play-offs, which happened in 2023 September, where Savusavu FC was facing Nasinu FC in promotion play-offs to the 2024 Fiji Premier League, which ended in a 1–1 draw, in the second leg, Nasinu FC won to advance to 2024 Fiji Premier League.
