= Aisake Tarogi =

Fijian rugby union player (born 1981)

- Born: Aisake Tarogi; February 15, 1981 (age 45) Suva
- Height: 1.93 m (6 ft 4 in)
- Weight: 134 kg (21 st 1 lb)

Rugby union career
- Position: Prop
- Current team: Le Bugue
International career
Years	Team	Apps	(Points)
2009	Fiji	3	(0)

Aisake Tarogi (born 15 February 1981 in Suva, Fiji) is a Fijian rugby union player. He plays prop for French club, Le Bugue.

== Career ==
Tarogi debuted for Fiji against Japan at Suva on July 3, 2009. He last played for Fiji in a test match against Romania at Bucharest on November 28, 2009.
