= Vatukoula =

Gold mining settlement in Fiji

- Village
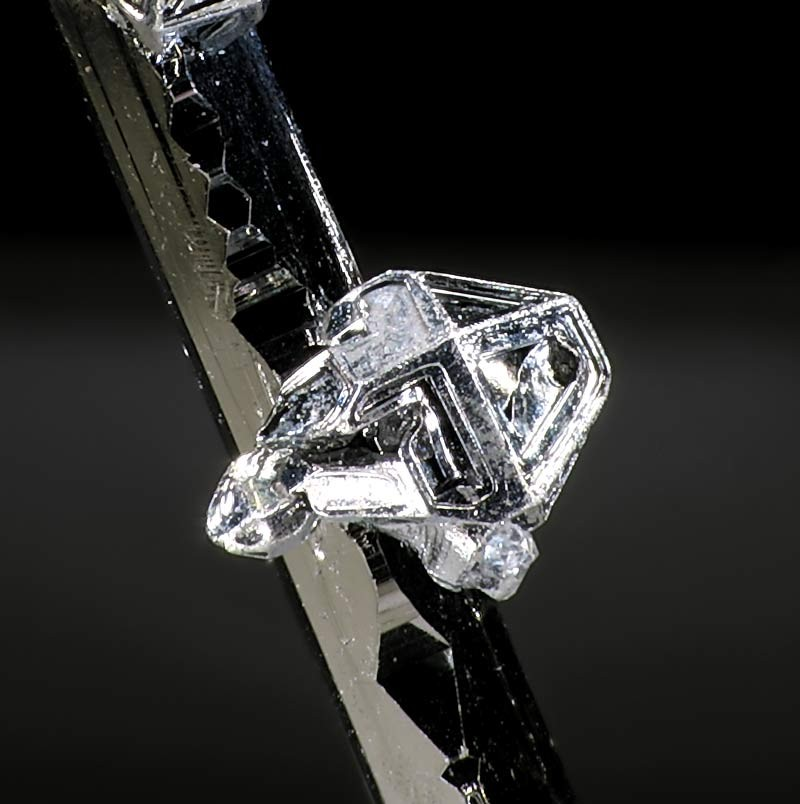
- Native tellurium crystal on sylvanite from the Emperor Mine, Vatukoula, Tavua Gold Field (image width 2 mm)

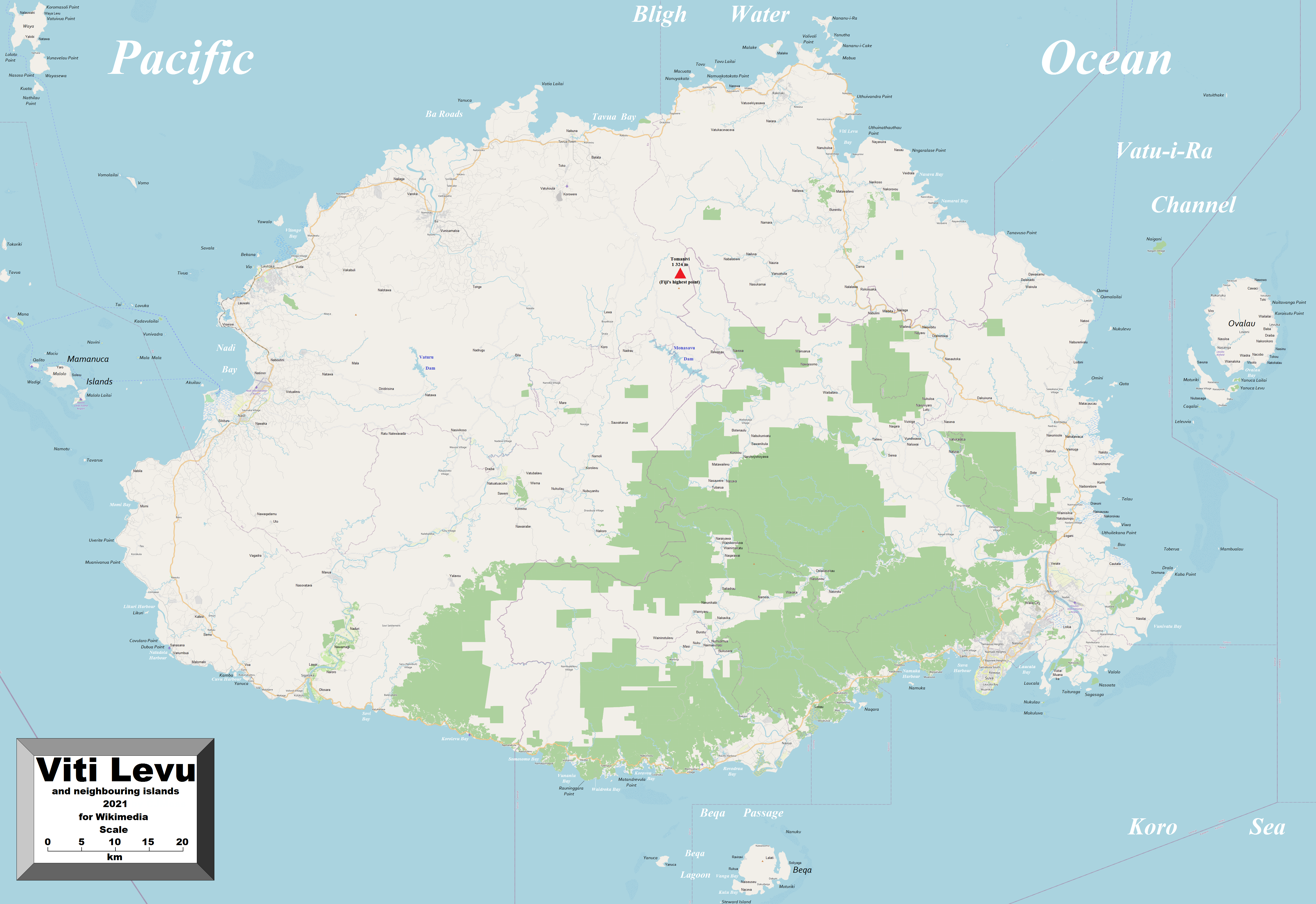
- Viti Levu with Vatukoula in the north

- Location in Fiji
- Country: Fiji
- Island: Viti Levu
- Division: Western Division
- Province: Ba
- Time zone: UTC+12

Vatukoula (Fijian pronunciation: [βatukɔu̯la], meaning "gold rock" in Fijian) is a gold mining settlement in Fiji, 9 km inland from the Town of Tavua on the island of Viti Levu.

== Colonial history ==
Vatukoula may be viewed historically as the cradle of the modern gold mining industry in Fiji. The discovery of gold in the Tavua district is attributed to Baron de Este, who found it in the Nasivi River in 1872. Some 20 years later, New Zealand prospector Fielding, began a systematic search along the Nasivi river. However, discovery of gold in commercial quantities in 1932 at Vatukoula, is attributed to Scottish prospector Bill Borthwick. A "gold rush" ensued – "pegs denoting claims went up everywhere" – from all the Fiji islands, "hundreds of people – villagers, shopkeepers and city dwellers – arrived at the diggings".

In 1934, a new Mining Ordinance to regulate the fledgling industry was introduced by the British colonial administration. In the same year, the Emperor Gold Mining Company Ltd. established its operations in Vatukoula, followed in 1935 by the Loloma (Fiji) Gold Mines, N.L., and then by Fiji Mines Development Ltd. (later to become Dolphin Mines. Ltd.). These developments ushered in a "mining boom" for Fiji, with gold production rising more than a hundred-fold, from 931.4 oz in 1934 to 107,788.5 oz in 1939, an order of magnitude then comparable to the output of New Zealand and the eastern Australian states.

The Ordinance also gave rise to a Mines Inspectorate, His Majesty's Colonial Mines Service recruiting Australian Frank T. M. White to set up a Mines Department in Suva. By 1939 White (as Inspector of Mines) initiated a geological survey of Viti Levu, resulting in Fiji's first geological survey map, published in 1943. Citing and building on this work, the mineralization (geology) of Fiji was systematically reviewed by a successor, Mines Inspector James FA Taylor, in 1953. And in the same year, a more detailed review of the geology of the Vatukoula Goldfield (also known as the Tavua Goldfield) was published by A Blatchford, geologist for the Emperor Gold Mining Company Ltd.; mining and milling operations were also reviewed in detail by their respective company superintendents. Both open-pit and underground mining were carried out in Vatukoula.

By 1952, the population of Vatukoula had reached approximately 4,500 people, second largest in the Colony of Fiji. The largest group was indigenous Fijian, while other groups included Pacific Islanders, Indian, Chinese, European, and people of mixed origins. About a third were employed directly in mining (as miners, truckers, equipment and locomotive operators, drivers, fitters and turners, welders, blacksmiths, carpenters, electricians, mill operators, foremen, first aid attendants, clerks etc.). The remainder comprised their dependents, as well as tradespeople, storekeepers, teachers, police and public service officials. Housing at a basic level was available for most employees, emphasizing potable water and sanitation. Industrial safety was promoted by the companies, while medical services (with government support) were provided in the community. Primary and secondary educational services were supported variously by government, industry and religious groups. Reflecting the culture of British colonialism, all services were of an uneven standard and aligned along racial, cultural and religious lines.

Despite these seemingly auspicious beginnings, the subsequent history of Vatukoula has been fraught with challenges, especially for the local population dependent on this single-industry town for their source of livelihood. Over the years, there have been accumulating concerns and periodic conflicts regarding: wages, safety practices, housing conditions, gender inequities, associated social problems, and the mine's environmental impact, particularly the air pollution caused by sulphur emissions.

== History Post-Independence (1970) ==
The Emperor Mines Limited (EML) shut down on 5 December 2006 due to low price of gold and the high level of capital required to sustain the mining operation. It sold its operations to Westech International, a private company based in Australia which, in turn, sold the mine to River Diamonds Plc (later renamed Vatukoula Gold Mines Plc), a British company. The mine's closure took place with virtually no warning, leaving 1,760 former employees, their families, local businesses, and local officials to deal with the sudden disappearance of their livelihoods without the benefit of significant social planning. The severity of their situation is apparent from a Submission to the EGM Closure Negotiating Committee in support of the Vatukoula Communities, dated 19 January 2007.

The following vignettes from the Submission reveals the anguish felt by community members:

"I was in tears. These innocent children!" Mrs Dominika Lutua, Principal of Goldfields School, describing her reaction when told on 6 December 2006 that the mine would provide no funds to the school beyond the end of January 2007.

The need for government action was emphasised in the Submission: "The company operating the mine has been the recipient of many financial assistance including grants, soft loans and generous tax concessions from the Fiji government these last many decades. The women and men of the Vatukoula communities have contributed millions of dollars in income taxes to the Government, despite living in unsanitary and over-crowded houses to which the Government has not provided basic services. They have also supported the company through their hard labour and dedication and even through salary sacrifices. The people of Vatukoula should expect immediate and favourable treatment from their Government and the company in their hour of need."

The mine re-opened in April 2008 and is currently producing gold, albeit now on a smaller scale. The history and impact of these events have also been studied by a team from the University of Vermont, serving as the basis for a Master of Science degree in Natural Resources. As noted in this thesis, the event caused hardship to many, but may serve as an important opportunity for reflection on the sustainability of mining as a means of development, and the risks and benefits that accompany such development activities.
