= Coastal Stallions =

Fijian rugby union team

(Fiji) Coastal Stallions
- Full name: Coastal Stallions
- Union: Fiji Rugby Union
- Coach(es): Joji Rinakama
- Captain(s): Apisai Turukawa
- League(s): Colonial Cup

The Coastal Stallions is a former Fijian rugby union team that had a franchise area covering Nadroga-Navosa, Namosi, Serua and Malolo. The team played in Fiji's premier rugby union competition the Colonial Cup from 2004 to 2008, winning the champioshup title three times before the competition ceased in 2008.

== History ==
The franchise was one of four original teams created for the inaugural Colonial Cup in 2004. They won the first Colonial Cup 26–21 over Suva Highlanders. They defeated 29-15 Suva Highlanders in a tough encounter in 2006 to clinch their second title.

== Club honours ==
- Colonial Cup winners 2004, 2006, 2007

== Coaching team ==
- Coach: Joji Rinakama
- Manager: Penaia Naresia
- Captain: Apisai Turukawa
