= Northern Sharks =

(Fiji) Northern Sharks
- Union: Fiji Rugby Union
- Coach(es): Rayne Simpson Junior
- League(s): Colonial Cup

The Northern Sharks is a former Fijian rugby union team that had a franchise area covering Vanua Levu, Taveuni, Ovalau, and Island Zone. The team was added to Fiji's premier Colonial Cup competition in 2005; previously the Northern Division had belonged to the Suva franchise. The Sharks competed in the Cup from 2005 to 2008 before the competition ceased in 2008.

== The 2007 squad ==
The 2007 Colonial Cup squad was as follows:-

Akuila Tabua, Temesia Bogidrau, Jeff Miller, Manueli Siganisucu, Warua Aritana, Vilise Ratuvule, Lemeki Laqere, Pio Ratavo, Jock Luita, Aliposo Bueta, Apisalome Waqabaca, Drauna Daugunu, Aporosa Beranaliva, Romulo Leweniqila, Malakai Tiko, Viliame Gonevulavula, Waisele Bola, Anare Koki, Naibuka Bola, Sakiusa, Timoci Vakadranu, Laupula, Nacanieli Abele, Isoa Gavidi, Aloesi, Anare Bana, Petero Kata, Penaia Yavala, Saiasi Bati, Maciu Vakaruru, Remesio Ravuiwasa, Jack Prasad, Samu Vakaruru, Gabriel Lovobalavu, Maikeli Evans, Penaia Vakaruru, Anasa Qio, Akuila Matanibukaca, Viliame Maya, Isoa Rokobici.

== Coach ==
- Rayne Simpson Junior

== Manager ==
- George Dregaso
