= Tavua, Fiji =

Town in Fiji

Tavua
- Village and Tikina
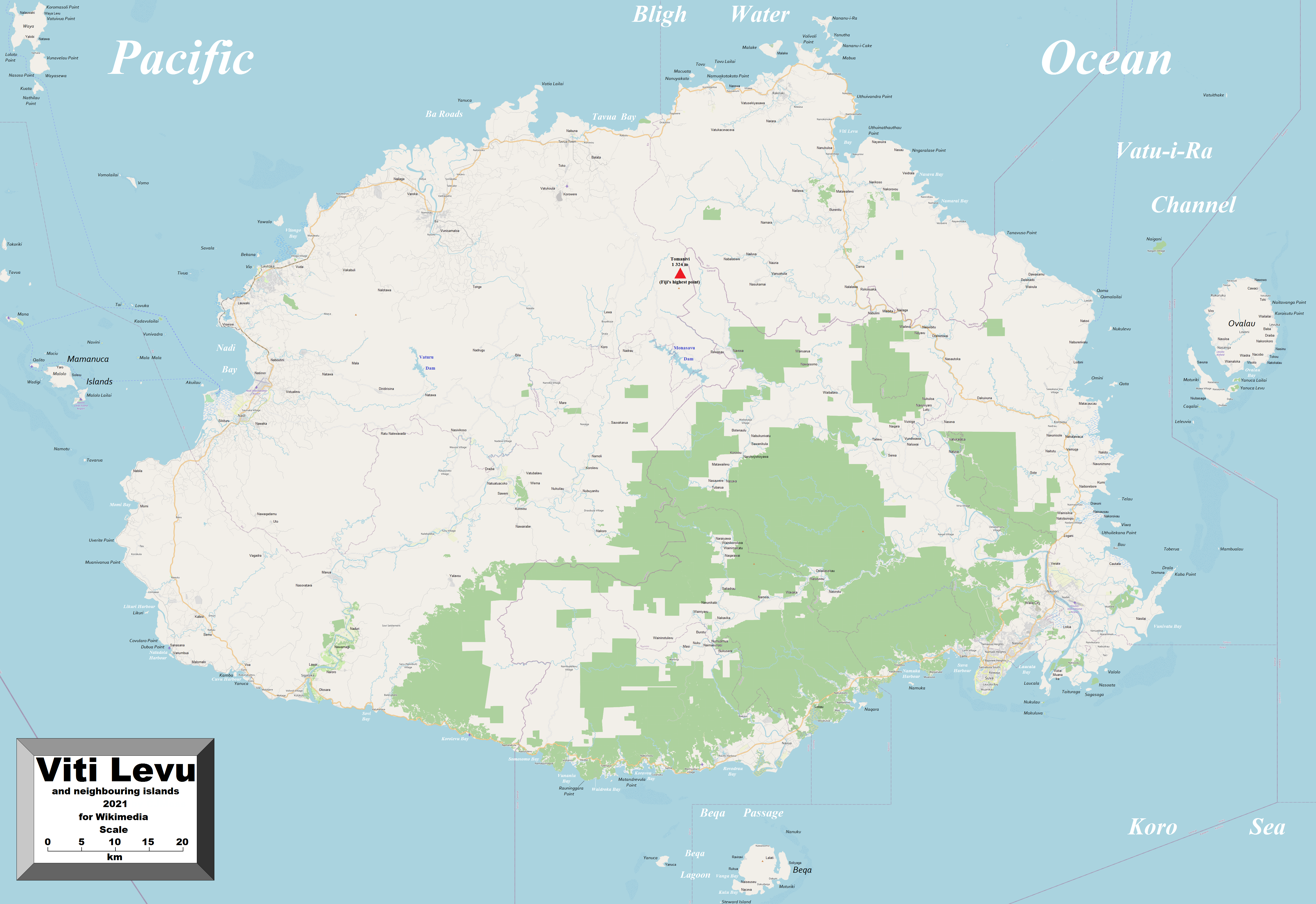
- Viti Levu with Tavua in the north

- Location in Fiji
- Country: Fiji
- Island: Viti Levu
- Division: Western Division
- Province: Ba
- Town: 1992

Area
  - Total: 39 sq mi (100 km^{2})

Population (2017)
  - Total: 8,810
  - Density: 230/sq mi (88/km^{2})
  - Tikina: 23,269
- Time zone: UTC+12

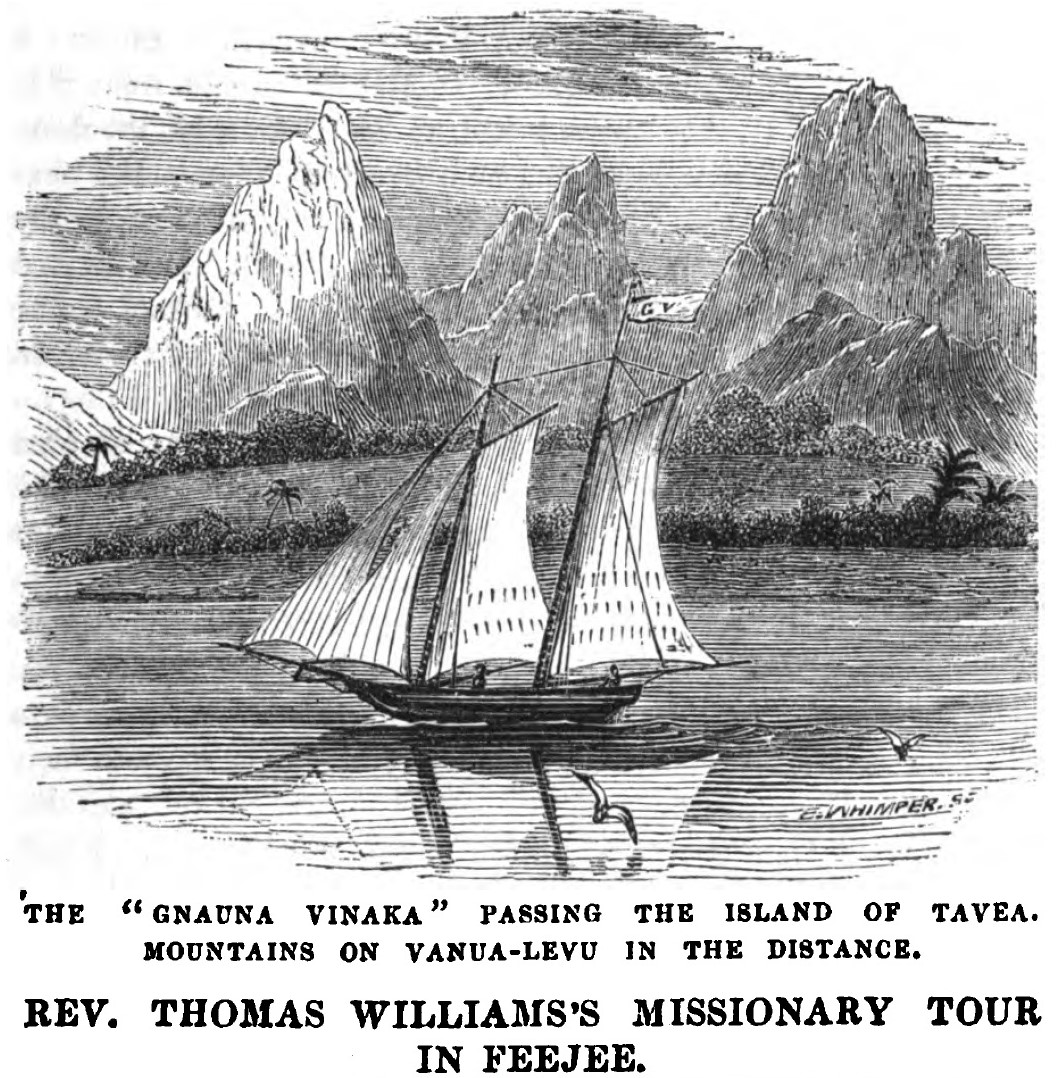
The Gnauna Vinaka Passing the Island of Tavea. Mountains of Vanua-Levu in the distance (June 1853, X, p.67)

Tavua (Fijian pronunciation: [taβua]) is a town and tikina (district) in Fiji, 91 kilometres from Nadi and 9 kilometres from the gold mining settlement of Vatukoula. It was formally incorporated as a Town in 1992 with the appointment of its first Mayor, Iliesa Vula from Tavualevu. The town covers a land area of 100 square kilometres, and had a population of 8,810 at the 2017 census.

Tavua is supposed to be governed by a 9-member Town Council, elected for a three-year term, who elect a Mayor from among themselves for a one-year term, renewable indefinitely. At the most recent municipal election, held on 22 October 2005, all 9 seats were won by the Tavua Ratepayers, Landowners, and Tenants Association. The new council reelected Chandra Singh, Mayor since 2001, for another term.

In 2009, the Military-backed interim government dismissed all municipal governments throughout Fiji and appointed special administrators to run the urban areas. As of 2015, elected municipal government has not been restored. The special administrator of Tavua is Tulsi Ram. He took office in January 2015, replacing Jay Whyte.

== Notable Tavuans ==
Olympic javelin thrower Leslie Copeland was born in Tavua. Hong Kong and Bristol Rugby Union player Luke Nabaro was born and raised there.
