= Fiji Rugby Union =

Governing body of rugby in Fiji

- Sport: Rugby union
- Founded: 1915; 110 years ago
- World Rugby affiliation: 1987
- Oceania Rugby affiliation: 2002
- Chairman: John Sanday
- CEO: Koli Sewabu
- Men's coach: Mick Byrne
- Women's coach: Ioan Cunningham
- Sevens coach: Men's: Osea Kolinisau; Women's: Richie Walker
- Website: www.fijirugby.com

Fiji Rugby Union (FRU) is the governing body for the sport of rugby union in Fiji. It is divided into over 30 provincial unions. The Fiji Rugby Union is a member of the Pacific Islands Rugby Alliance (PIRA), along with Samoa and Tonga. There are approximately 80,000 registered players from a total population of around 950,000.

== National teams ==
=== International 15s ===
Otherwise known as the "Flying Fijians," the team gained No 9 in the IRB World Rankings after defeating Wales to enter the 2007 Rugby World Cup but slid down No 11 as a result of losses in the 2008 IRB Pacific Nations Cup. They sit 8th in the IRB world rankings as of 26 November 2018.

=== International 7s ===
Fiji has won the Rugby World Cup Sevens twice, in 1997 and the 2005. They also play in the World Rugby Sevens Series, an annual circuit of eight tournaments around the world, winning the series in 2006 and ending the six-year reign of New Zealand on that circuit. However, they lost the title to New Zealand in 2007, and did not win any tournaments in the 2007–2008 Series. Fiji has shone in rugby sevens, finishing the 2013 Sevens World Series third behind New Zealand and South Africa.

=== Other teams ===
Other teams include the Fiji A "Warriors", Fiji Under 20 team (competing at the annual IRB Junior World Championship), other age group international teams, and a women's team, currently under development and hoping for an invitation to the Women's Rugby World Cup.

== Domestic competition ==
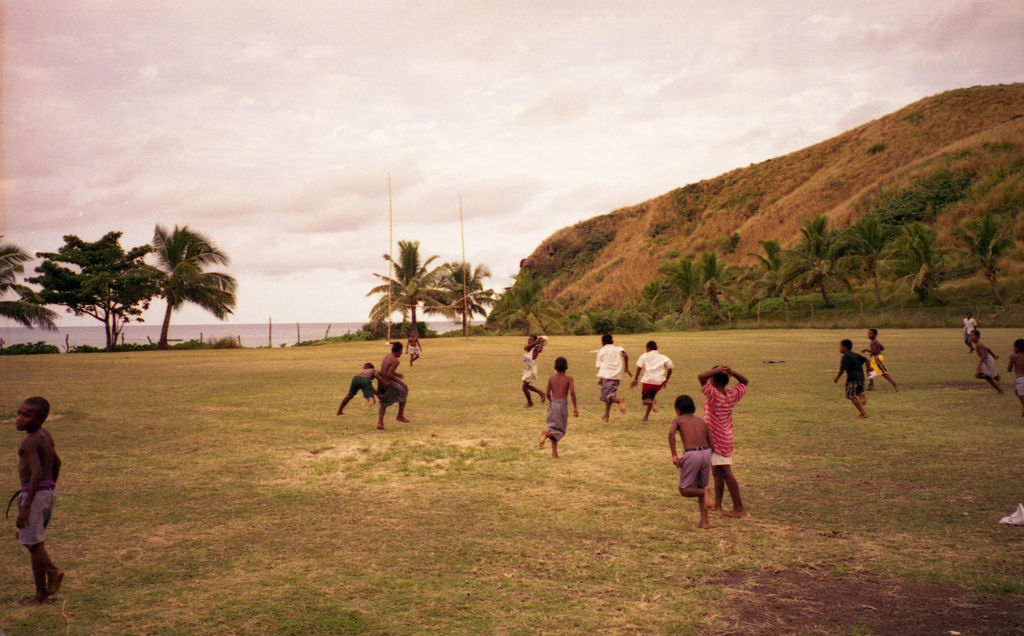
Rugby union being played in Fiji

The national provincial Premier championship is the Skipper Cup competition.

A professional six team domestic competition, the Colonial Cup (similar in design to Super Rugby), ran from 2004 to 2008. Before this, Fiji had 12 Division One teams. Five teams were made up of the players from the 12 Division One teams, based on regional lines, with the aim of creating a "more competitive competition that leads on and provides a higher level of competitive domestic rugby".

The FRU also has developed a base pay for players at international level.

Domestic competitions include the Farebrother-Sullivan Trophy, and a domestic 7s tournament.

== Former office bearers ==
- Pio Bosco Tikoisuva, CEO 2001–05
- Charlie Charters, marketing manager 2001–04, occasional acting CEO
- Wayne Pivac, national coach 2004–05
- Mac McCallion, national coach 2002–04
- George Simpkin, coach 1984–90

== See also ==
- Rugby union in Fiji
