= 2011 Rugby World Cup Pool A =

External videos
- Rugby World Cup 2011: France v Tonga on YouTube

Pool A of the 2011 Rugby World Cup began on 9 September 2011 and was completed on 2 October 2011. The pool was composed of hosts New Zealand, the fourth-placed team from 2007, France; as well as Canada, Japan and Tonga. One of the biggest shocks in the history of the tournament came when Tonga beat France by 19 points to 14. On 3 October 2011, it was announced that New Zealand winger Richard Kahui had been voted the Player of Pool A.

== Standings ==
Pos	Team	Pld	W	D	L	PF	PA	PD	T	B	Pts	Qualification
1	New Zealand	4	4	0	0	240	49	+191	36	4	20	Advanced to the quarter-finals and qualified for the 2015 Rugby World Cup
2	France	4	2	0	2	124	96	+28	13	3	11	Advanced to the quarter-finals and qualified for the 2015 Rugby World Cup
3	Tonga	4	2	0	2	80	98	−18	7	1	9	Eliminated but qualified for 2015 Rugby World Cup
4	Canada	4	1	1	2	82	168	−86	9	0	6	
5	Japan	4	0	1	3	69	184	−115	8	0	2	

== Matches ==
All times are local New Zealand time (UTC+12 until 24 September, UTC+13 from 25 September)

=== New Zealand vs Tonga ===
9 September 2011
20:30

New Zealand	41–10	Tonga
Try: Dagg (2) 11' m, 29' c Kahui (2) 20' c, 32' c Kaino 59' m Nonu 77' c Con: Carter (3/5); Slade (1/1); Pen: Carter (1/1) 5'	Report	Try: Taumalolo 72' c Con: Morath (1/1); Pen: Morath (1/2) 40+'

Eden Park, Auckland
Attendance: 60,214
Referee: George Clancy (Ireland)

FB	15	Israel Dagg
RW	14	Richard Kahui
OC	13	Ma'a Nonu
IC	12	Sonny Bill Williams
LW	11	Isaia Toeava	(substituted off) 62'
FH	10	Dan Carter	(substituted off) 74'
SH	9	Jimmy Cowan	(substituted off) 53'
N8	8	Victor Vito	(substituted off) 75'
OF	7	Richie McCaw (c)
BF	6	Jerome Kaino
RL	5	Ali Williams
LL	4	Brad Thorn	(substituted off) 56'
TP	3	Owen Franks
HK	2	Andrew Hore	(substituted off) 74'
LP	1	Tony Woodcock	(substituted off) 45'
Replacements:
HK	16	Corey Flynn	(substituted in) 74'
PR	17	Ben Franks	(substituted in) 45'
LK	18	Anthony Boric	(substituted in) 75'
LK	19	Sam Whitelock	(substituted in) 56'
SH	20	Piri Weepu	(substituted in) 53'
FH	21	Colin Slade	(substituted in) 74'
WG	22	Cory Jane	(substituted in) 62'
Coach:
Graham Henry

FB	15	Vunga Lilo
RW	14	Viliame Iongi
OC	13	Suka Hufanga	(substituted off) 75'
IC	12	Andrew Maʻilei	(substituted off) 41'
LW	11	Siale Piutau
FH	10	Kurt Morath
SH	9	Taniela Moa
N8	8	Viliami Maʻafu
OF	7	Finau Maka (c)	(substituted off) 54'
BF	6	Sione Kalamafoni
RL	5	Joe Tuineau
LL	4	Paino Hehea	(substituted off) 41'
TP	3	Taufaʻao Filise	(substituted off) 53'
HK	2	Aleki Lutui	(substituted off) 41'
LP	1	Soane Tongaʻuiha	(substituted off) 53'
Replacements:
HK	16	Ephraim Taukafa	(substituted in) 41'
PR	17	Sona Taumalolo	(substituted in) 53'
PR	18	Kisi Pulu	(substituted in) 53'
LK	19	Sione Timani	(substituted in) 41'
N8	20	Samiu Vahafolau	(substituted in) 54'
SH	21	Samisoni Fisilau	(substituted in) 75'
CE	22	Alipate Fatafehi	(substituted in) 41'
Coach:
(New Zealand) Isitolo Maka

Man of the Match:
Richard Kahui (New Zealand)

Touch judges:
Craig Joubert (South Africa)
Stuart Terheege (England)
Television match official:
Giulio De Santis (Italy)

=== France vs Japan ===
10 September 2011
18:00

France	47–21	Japan
Try: Pierre 5' c Trinh-Duc 12' c Clerc 34' m Nallet 71' c Papé 77' c Parra 80+' m Con: Yachvili (4/6); Pen: Yachvili (3/3) 21', 28', 67'	Report	Try: Arlidge (2) 31' m, 49' c Con: Arlidge (1/2); Pen: Arlidge (3/3) 18', 40', 58'

North Harbour Stadium, Auckland
Attendance: 28,569
Referee: Steve Walsh (Australia)

FB	15	Cédric Heymans
RW	14	Vincent Clerc
OC	13	Aurélien Rougerie
IC	12	Fabrice Estebanez	(substituted off) 48'
LW	11	Maxime Médard
FH	10	François Trinh-Duc	(substituted off) 51'
SH	9	Dimitri Yachvili
N8	8	Raphael Lakafia
OF	7	Imanol Harinordoquy	(substituted off) 74'
BF	6	Thierry Dusautoir (c)
RL	5	Lionel Nallet
LL	4	Julien Pierre	(substituted off) 73'
TP	3	Nicolas Mas
HK	2	William Servat	(substituted off) 52'
LP	1	Fabien Barcella	(substituted off) 51'
Replacements:
HK	16	Dimitri Szarzewski	(substituted in) 52'
PR	17	Jean-Baptiste Poux	(substituted in) 51'
LK	18	Pascal Papé	(substituted in) 73'
FL	19	Julien Bonnaire	(substituted in) 74'
SH	20	Morgan Parra		(substituted in) 62'
FH	21	David Skrela	(substituted in) 51'	(substituted off) 62'
CE	22	David Marty	(substituted in) 48'
Coach:
Marc Lièvremont

FB	15	Shaun Webb	(substituted off) 66'
RW	14	Kosuke Endo
OC	13	Koji Taira	(substituted off) 54'
IC	12	Ryan Nicholas
LW	11	Hirotoki Onozawa
FH	10	James Arlidge
SH	9	Fumiaki Tanaka	(substituted off) 66'
N8	8	Koliniasi Holani	(substituted off) 36'
OF	7	Michael Leitch
BF	6	Takashi Kikutani (c)
RL	5	Toshizumi Kitagawa
LL	4	Luke Thompson
TP	3	Kensuke Hatakeyama	(substituted off) 43'
HK	2	Shota Horie
LP	1	Hisateru Hirashima
Replacements:
HK	16	Yusuke Aoki
PR	17	Nozomu Fujita	(substituted in) 43'
LK	18	Hitoshi Ono
N8	19	Itaru Taniguchi	(substituted in) 36'
SH	20	Atsushi Hiwasa	(substituted in) 66'
FH	21	Murray Williams	(substituted in) 66'
CE	22	Alisi Tupuailei	(substituted in) 54'
Coach:
(New Zealand) John Kirwan

Man of the Match:
James Arlidge (Japan)

Touch judges:
Alain Rolland (Ireland)
Stuart Terheege (England)
Television match official:
Giulio De Santis (Italy)

=== Tonga vs Canada ===
14 September 2011
17:00

Tonga	20–25	Canada
Try: Piutau (2) 40' c, 53' c Con: Morath (2/2); Pen: Morath (2/4) 43', 64'	Report	Try: Sinclair 13' c Carpenter 67' m Mackenzie 73' c Con: Pritchard (2/3); Pen: Pritchard (2/2) 26', 45'

Northland Events Centre, Whangārei
Attendance: 17,174
Referee: Jonathan Kaplan (South Africa)

FB	15	Kurt Morath
RW	14	Fetuʻu Vainikolo
OC	13	Siale Piutau
IC	12	Alipate Fatafehi
LW	11	William Helu	(substituted off) 66'
FH	10	Taniela Moa
SH	9	Tomasi Palu
N8	8	Samiu Vahafolau	(substituted off) 50'
OF	7	Sione Vaiomoʻunga
BF	6	Finau Maka (c)
RL	5	Tukulua Lokotui
LL	4	Sione Timani	(substituted off) 54'
TP	3	Kisi Pulu	(substituted off) 52'
HK	2	Ephraim Taukafa	(substituted off) 65'
LP	1	Sona Taumalolo	(substituted off) 75'
Replacements:
HK	16	Ilaisa Maʻasi	(substituted in) 65'
PR	17	Soane Tongaʻuiha	(substituted in) 75'
PR	18	Halani Aulika	(substituted in) 52'
N8	19	Viliami Maʻafu	(substituted in) 50'
FL	20	Sione Kalamafoni	(substituted in) 54'
FB	21	Viliame Iongi
WG	22	Alaska Taufa	(substituted in) 66'
Coach:
(New Zealand) Isitolo Maka

FB	15	James Pritchard
RW	14	Ciaran Hearn
OC	13	D. T. H. van der Merwe
IC	12	Ryan Smith	(substituted off) 65'
LW	11	Phil Mackenzie
FH	10	Ander Monro
SH	9	Ed Fairhurst
N8	8	Aaron Carpenter
OF	7	Chauncey O'Toole	(substituted off) 32'
BF	6	Adam Kleeberger
RL	5	Jamie Cudmore
LL	4	Jebb Sinclair	(substituted off) 74'
TP	3	Jason Marshall	(substituted off) 75'
HK	2	Pat Riordan (c)	31' to 40+'		(substituted off) 69'
LP	1	Hubert Buydens
Replacements:
HK	16	Ryan Hamilton	(substituted in) 31'	(substituted off) 40+'	(substituted in) 69'
PR	17	Scott Franklin	(substituted in) 75'
LK	18	Tyler Hotson	(substituted in) 32'
FL	19	Nanyak Dala	(substituted in) 74'
CE	20	Conor Trainor	(substituted in) 65'
SH	21	Sean White
FH	22	Nathan Hirayama
Coach:
(New Zealand) Kieran Crowley

Man of the Match:
Adam Kleeberger (Canada)

Touch judges:
Steve Walsh (Australia)
Stuart Terheege (England)
Television match official:
Giulio De Santis (Italy)

=== New Zealand vs Japan ===
16 September 2011
20:00

New Zealand	83–7	Japan
Try: Smith 4' c Kahui (2) 16' m, 45' c Kaino 21' m Mealamu 30' c Ellis 34' c Slade 36' c S. Williams (2) 51' c, 79' c Toeava 56' c Hore 60' m Nonu 62' m Thomson 76' c Con: Slade (9/13)	Report	Try: Onozawa 58' c Con: M. Williams (1/1)

Waikato Stadium, Hamilton
Attendance: 30,484
Referee: Nigel Owens (Wales)

FB	15	Isaia Toeava	(substituted off) 62'
RW	14	Cory Jane	(substituted off) 44'
OC	13	Conrad Smith
IC	12	Ma'a Nonu
LW	11	Richard Kahui
FH	10	Colin Slade
SH	9	Andy Ellis	(substituted off) 62'
N8	8	Victor Vito	(substituted off) 57'
OF	7	Adam Thomson
BF	6	Jerome Kaino
RL	5	Sam Whitelock
LL	4	Brad Thorn	(substituted off) 72'
TP	3	Owen Franks	(substituted off) 63'
HK	2	Keven Mealamu (c)	(substituted off) 44'
LP	1	Tony Woodcock
Replacements:
HK	16	Andrew Hore	(substituted in) 44'
PR	17	John Afoa	(substituted in) 63'
LK	18	Ali Williams	(substituted in) 57'
LK	19	Anthony Boric	(substituted in) 72'
SH	20	Jimmy Cowan	(substituted in) 62'
SH	21	Piri Weepu	(substituted in) 62'
CE	22	Sonny Bill Williams	(substituted in) 44'
Coach:
Graham Henry

FB	15	Taihei Ueda	(substituted off) 52'
RW	14	Takehisa Usuzuki
OC	13	Koji Taira	(substituted off) 46'
IC	12	Yuta Iwamura	(substituted off) 71'
LW	11	Hirotoki Onozawa
FH	10	Murray Williams
SH	9	Atsushi Hiwasa
N8	8	Takashi Kikutani (c)
OF	7	Michael Leitch
BF	6	Itaru Taniguchi
RL	5	Toshizumi Kitagawa	(substituted off) 59'
LL	4	Hitoshi Ono
TP	3	Nozomu Fujita
HK	2	Yusuke Aoki	(substituted off) 64'
LP	1	Naoki Kawamata
Replacements:
HK	16	Hiroki Yuhara	(substituted in) 64'
PR	17	Kensuke Hatakeyama
LK	18	Yuji Kitagawa	(substituted in) 59'
FL	19	Sione Vatuvei
SH	20	Tomoki Yoshida	(substituted in) 71'
FB	21	Shaun Webb	(substituted in) 52'
CE	22	Alisi Tupuailei	(substituted in) 46'
Coach:
(New Zealand) John Kirwan

Man of the Match:
Ma'a Nonu (New Zealand)

Touch judges:
Alain Rolland (Ireland)
Jérôme Garcès (France)
Television match official:
Giulio De Santis (Italy)

=== France vs Canada ===
18 September 2011
20:30

France	46–19	Canada
Try: Clerc (3) 4' c, 79' c, 80+' c Traille 64' c Con: Parra (4/4); Pen: Parra (5/6) 17', 37', 39', 40+', 48'; Drop: Trinh-Duc 57'	Report	Try: Smith 7' c Con: Pritchard (1/1); Pen: Pritchard (2/4) 3', 60'; Drop: Monro (2) 44', 49'

McLean Park, Napier
Attendance: 14,230
Referee: Craig Joubert (South Africa)

FB	15	Damien Traille
RW	14	Vincent Clerc
OC	13	David Marty
IC	12	Maxime Mermoz
LW	11	Aurélien Rougerie (c)	(substituted off) 72'
FH	10	François Trinh-Duc	(substituted off) 70'
SH	9	Morgan Parra
N8	8	Louis Picamoles
OF	7	Julien Bonnaire
BF	6	Fulgence Ouedraogo	(substituted off) 76'
RL	5	Romain Millo-Chluski	(substituted off) 64'
LL	4	Pascal Papé
TP	3	Luc Ducalcon				(substituted off) 80'
HK	2	William Servat	(substituted off) 53'
LP	1	Jean-Baptiste Poux	18' to 28'		(substituted off) 46'	(substituted in) 80'
Replacements:
HK	16	Guilhem Guirado	(substituted in) 53'
PR	17	Fabien Barcella	(substituted in) 18'	(substituted off) 28'	(substituted in) 46'
LK	18	Julien Pierre	(substituted in) 64'
FL	19	Imanol Harinordoquy	(substituted in) 76'
SH	20	Dimitri Yachvili	(substituted in) 70'
CE	21	Fabrice Estebanez
WG	22	Maxime Médard	(substituted in) 72'
Coach:
Marc Lièvremont

FB	15	James Pritchard
RW	14	Ciaran Hearn
OC	13	D. T. H. van der Merwe	(substituted off) 67'
IC	12	Ryan Smith
LW	11	Phil Mackenzie
FH	10	Ander Monro	(substituted off) 71'
SH	9	Ed Fairhurst	(substituted off) 62'
N8	8	Aaron Carpenter
OF	7	Chauncey O'Toole	(substituted off) 63'
BF	6	Adam Kleeberger
RL	5	Jamie Cudmore	(substituted off) 59'
LL	4	Jebb Sinclair
TP	3	Jason Marshall	(substituted off) 62'
HK	2	Pat Riordan (c)	(substituted off) 60'
LP	1	Hubert Buydens
Replacements:
HK	16	Ryan Hamilton	(substituted in) 60'
PR	17	Scott Franklin	(substituted in) 62'
LK	18	Tyler Hotson	(substituted in) 59'
FL	19	Nanyak Dala	(substituted in) 63'
SH	20	Sean White	(substituted in) 62'
FH	21	Nathan Hirayama	(substituted in) 71'
CE	22	Conor Trainor	(substituted in) 67'
Coach:
(New Zealand) Kieran Crowley

Man of the Match:
Louis Picamoles (France)

Touch judges:
Bryce Lawrence (New Zealand)
Vinny Munro (New Zealand)
Television match official:
Matt Goddard (Australia)

=== Tonga vs Japan ===
21 September 2011
19:30

Tonga	31–18	Japan
Try: Maʻafu 7' m Lokotui 14' c Vainikolo 54' c Con: Morath (2/3); Pen: Morath (4/4) 28', 31', 49', 67'	Report	Try: Hatakeyama 13' m Leitch 25' m Tupuailei 63' m Pen: Webb (1/1) 39'

Northland Events Centre, Whangārei
Attendance: 17,364
Referee: Dave Pearson (England)

FB	15	Vunga Lilo
RW	14	Fetuʻu Vainikolo
OC	13	Siale Piutau
IC	12	Alipate Fatafehi
LW	11	Suka Hufanga		(substituted off) 68'
FH	10	Kurt Morath
SH	9	Taniela Moa		(substituted off) 75'
N8	8	Viliami Maʻafu
OF	7	Sione Vaiomoʻunga			(substituted off) 64'
BF	6	Sione Kalamafoni
RL	5	Paino Hehea		(substituted off) 65'
LL	4	Tukulua Lokotui	(yellow card) 78'
TP	3	Taufaʻao Filise		(substituted off) 40'	(substituted in) 64'	(substituted off) 72'
HK	2	Aleki Lutui (c)		(substituted off) 48'
LP	1	Soane Tongaʻuiha		(substituted off) 40'
Replacements:
HK	16	Ilaisa Maʻasi		(substituted in) 48'
PR	17	Sona Taumalolo		(substituted in) 40'
PR	18	Halani Aulika	(yellow card) 61'	(substituted in) 40'
LK	19	Joe Tuineau		(substituted in) 65'
N8	20	Samiu Vahafolau				(substituted in) 72'
SH	21	Samisoni Fisilau		(substituted in) 75'
CE	22	Andrew Maʻilei		(substituted in) 68'
Coach:
(New Zealand) Isitolo Maka

FB	15	Shaun Webb
RW	14	Kosuke Endo
OC	13	Alisi Tupuailei
IC	12	Ryan Nicholas
LW	11	Hirotoki Onozawa
FH	10	James Arlidge	(yellow card) 30'
SH	9	Fumiaki Tanaka		(substituted off) 52'
N8	8	Takashi Kikutani (c)
OF	7	Michael Leitch
BF	6	Itaru Taniguchi		(substituted off) 52'
RL	5	Toshizumi Kitagawa		(substituted off) 57'
LL	4	Luke Thompson
TP	3	Kensuke Hatakeyama		(substituted off) 68'
HK	2	Shota Horie
LP	1	Hisateru Hirashima
Replacements:
HK	16	Yusuke Aoki
PR	17	Nozomu Fujita		(substituted in) 68'
LK	18	Hitoshi Ono		(substituted in) 57'
FL	19	Sione Vatuvei		(substituted in) 52'
SH	20	Atsushi Hiwasa		(substituted in) 52'
WG	21	Takehisa Usuzuki
FH	22	Murray Williams
Coach:
(New Zealand) John Kirwan

Man of the Match:
Michael Leitch (Japan)

Touch judges:
Alain Rolland (Ireland)
Stuart Terheege (England)
Television match official:
Giulio De Santis (Italy)

=== New Zealand vs France ===
24 September 2011
20:30

New Zealand	37–17	France
Try: Thomson 10' m Jane 17' c Dagg (2) 21', 42' c S. Williams 77' m Con: Carter (3/5); Pen: Carter (1/1) 48'; Drop: Carter (1/1) 64'	Report	Try: Mermoz 54' c Trinh-Duc 76' c Con: Yachvili (2/2); Pen: Yachvili (1/1) 39'

Eden Park, Auckland
Attendance: 60,856
Referee: Alain Rolland (Ireland)

FB	15	Israel Dagg
RW	14	Cory Jane	(substituted off) 34'
OC	13	Conrad Smith
IC	12	Ma'a Nonu
LW	11	Richard Kahui	(substituted off) 62'
FH	10	Dan Carter
SH	9	Piri Weepu	(substituted off) 55'
N8	8	Adam Thomson	(substituted off) 72'
OF	7	Richie McCaw (c)
BF	6	Jerome Kaino
RL	5	Sam Whitelock	(substituted off) 56'
LL	4	Brad Thorn
TP	3	Owen Franks	(substituted off) 69'	(substituted in) 74'	(substituted off) 77'
HK	2	Keven Mealamu	(substituted off) 55'
LP	1	Tony Woodcock
Replacements:
HK	16	Andrew Hore	(substituted in) 55'
PR	17	Ben Franks	(substituted in) 69'	74' to 77'
LK	18	Ali Williams	(substituted in) 56'
LK	19	Anthony Boric	(substituted in) 72'
SH	20	Andy Ellis	(substituted in) 55'
FH	21	Colin Slade	(substituted in) 62'
CE	22	Sonny Bill Williams	(substituted in) 34'
Coach:
Graham Henry

FB	15	Damien Traille	(substituted off) 41'
RW	14	Vincent Clerc
OC	13	Aurélien Rougerie	(substituted off) 69'
IC	12	Maxime Mermoz
LW	11	Maxime Médard
FH	10	Morgan Parra	(substituted off) 64'
SH	9	Dimitri Yachvili
N8	8	Louis Picamoles	(substituted off) 41'
OF	7	Julien Bonnaire
BF	6	Thierry Dusautoir (c)
RL	5	Lionel Nallet
LL	4	Pascal Papé	(substituted off) 64'
TP	3	Luc Ducalcon	(substituted off) 41'
HK	2	Dimitri Szarzewski	(substituted off) 53'
LP	1	Jean-Baptiste Poux
Replacements:
HK	16	William Servat	(substituted in) 53'
PR	17	Fabien Barcella	(substituted in) 41'
LK	18	Julien Pierre	(substituted in) 64'
FL	19	Imanol Harinordoquy	(substituted in) 41'
FH	20	François Trinh-Duc	(substituted in) 64'
CE	21	Fabrice Estebanez	(substituted in) 69'
FB	22	Cédric Heymans	(substituted in) 41'
Coach:
Marc Lièvremont

Man of the Match:
Israel Dagg (New Zealand)

Touch judges:
George Clancy (Ireland)
Carlo Damasco (Italy)
Television match official:
Graham Hughes (England)

=== Canada vs Japan ===
27 September 2011
17:00

Canada	23–23	Japan
Try: Van der Merwe 7' c Mackenzie 44' m Monro 75' m Con: Pritchard (1/1); Pen: Monro (2/3) 64', 79'	Report	Try: Horie 10' c Endo 40' c Con: Arlidge (2/2); Pen: Arlidge (3/3) 24', 66', 73'

McLean Park, Napier
Attendance: 14,335
Referee: Jonathan Kaplan (South Africa)

FB	15	James Pritchard	21' to 28'		(substituted off) 40'
RW	14	Matt Evans
OC	13	D. T. H. van der Merwe
IC	12	Ryan Smith
LW	11	Phil Mackenzie
FH	10	Ander Monro
SH	9	Ed Fairhurst	(substituted off) 71'
N8	8	Aaron Carpenter
OF	7	Chauncey O'Toole	(substituted off) 64'
BF	6	Adam Kleeberger
RL	5	Jamie Cudmore	(substituted off) 73'
LL	4	Jebb Sinclair
TP	3	Jason Marshall	(substituted off) 67'
HK	2	Pat Riordan (c)	(substituted off) 60'
LP	1	Hubert Buydens
Replacements:
HK	16	Ryan Hamilton	(substituted in) 60'
PR	17	Scott Franklin	(substituted in) 67'
LK	18	Tyler Hotson	(substituted in) 73'
N8	19	Jeremy Kyne	(substituted in) 64'
SH	20	Sean White	(substituted in) 71'
FH	21	Nathan Hirayama
CE	22	Conor Trainor	(substituted in) 21'	(substituted off) 28'	(substituted in) 40'
Coach:
(New Zealand) Kieran Crowley

FB	15	Shaun Webb	(substituted off) 73'
RW	14	Kosuke Endo
OC	13	Alisi Tupuailei	(substituted off) 13'
IC	12	Ryan Nicholas
LW	11	Hirotoki Onozawa
FH	10	James Arlidge
SH	9	Fumiaki Tanaka	(substituted off) 64'
N8	8	Takashi Kikutani (c)
OF	7	Michael Leitch
BF	6	Sione Vatuvei	(substituted off) 64'
RL	5	Toshizumi Kitagawa	(substituted off) 64'
LL	4	Luke Thompson
TP	3	Nozomu Fujita	(substituted off) 25'
HK	2	Shota Horie
LP	1	Hisateru Hirashima
Replacements:
HK	16	Yusuke Aoki
PR	17	Kensuke Hatakeyama	(substituted in) 25'
LK	18	Hitoshi Ono	(substituted in) 64'
N8	19	Toetuu Taufa	(substituted in) 64'
SH	20	Atsushi Hiwasa	(substituted in) 64'
FH	21	Murray Williams	(substituted in) 73'
CE	22	Bryce Robins	(substituted in) 13'
Coach:
(New Zealand) John Kirwan

Man of the Match:
Sione Vatuvei (Japan)

Touch judges:
Bryce Lawrence (New Zealand)
Vinny Munro (New Zealand)
Television match official:
Matt Goddard (Australia)

=== France vs Tonga ===
1 October 2011
18:00

France	14–19	Tonga
Try: Clerc 80+' m Pen: Yachvili (3/3) 2', 23', 50'	Report	Try: Hufanga 26' c Con: Morath (1/1); Pen: Morath (4/8) 7', 36', 67', 73'

Wellington Regional Stadium, Wellington
Attendance: 32,763
Referee: Steve Walsh (Australia)

FB	15	Maxime Médard
RW	14	Vincent Clerc
OC	13	Aurélien Rougerie		(substituted off) 59'
IC	12	Maxime Mermoz
LW	11	Alexis Palisson		(substituted off) 77'
FH	10	Morgan Parra		(substituted off) 59'
SH	9	Dimitri Yachvili
N8	8	Raphaël Lakafia		(substituted off) 54'
OF	7	Julien Bonnaire
BF	6	Thierry Dusautoir (c)
RL	5	Romain Millo-Chluski
LL	4	Pascal Papé		(substituted off) 67'
TP	3	Luc Ducalcon		(substituted off) 43'	(substituted in) 45'
HK	2	William Servat		(substituted off) 51'
LP	1	Jean-Baptiste Poux			(substituted off) 45'
Replacements:
HK	16	Dimitri Szarzewski		(substituted in) 51'
PR	17	Fabien Barcella		(substituted in) 43'
LK	18	Julien Pierre		(substituted in) 67'
FL	19	Imanol Harinordoquy		(substituted in) 54'
FH	20	François Trinh-Duc		(substituted in) 59'
CE	21	Fabrice Estebanez	(yellow card) 65'	(substituted in) 59'
FB	22	Cédric Heymans		(substituted in) 77'
Coach:
Marc Lièvremont

FB	15	Vunga Lilo
RW	14	Viliame Iongi
OC	13	Siale Piutau
IC	12	Andrew Maʻilei		(substituted off) 61'
LW	11	Suka Hufanga	(yellow card) 38'	(substituted off) 73'
FH	10	Kurt Morath
SH	9	Taniela Moa
N8	8	Viliami Maʻafu
OF	7	Finau Maka (c)		(substituted off) 49'
BF	6	Sione Kalamafoni
RL	5	Paino Hehea		(substituted off) 58'
LL	4	Tukulua Lokotui
TP	3	Kisi Pulu		(substituted off) 41'
HK	2	Aleki Lutui
LP	1	Soane Tongaʻuiha		(substituted off) 48'
Replacements:
HK	16	Ephraim Taukafa
PR	17	Alisona Taumalolo		(substituted in) 48'
PR	18	Halani Aulika		(substituted in) 41'
LK	19	Joseph Tuineau		(substituted in) 58'
N8	20	Samiu Vahafolau		(substituted in) 49'
SH	21	Tomasi Palu		(substituted in) 73'
CE	22	Alipate Fatafehi		(substituted in) 61'
Coach:
(New Zealand) Isitolo Maka

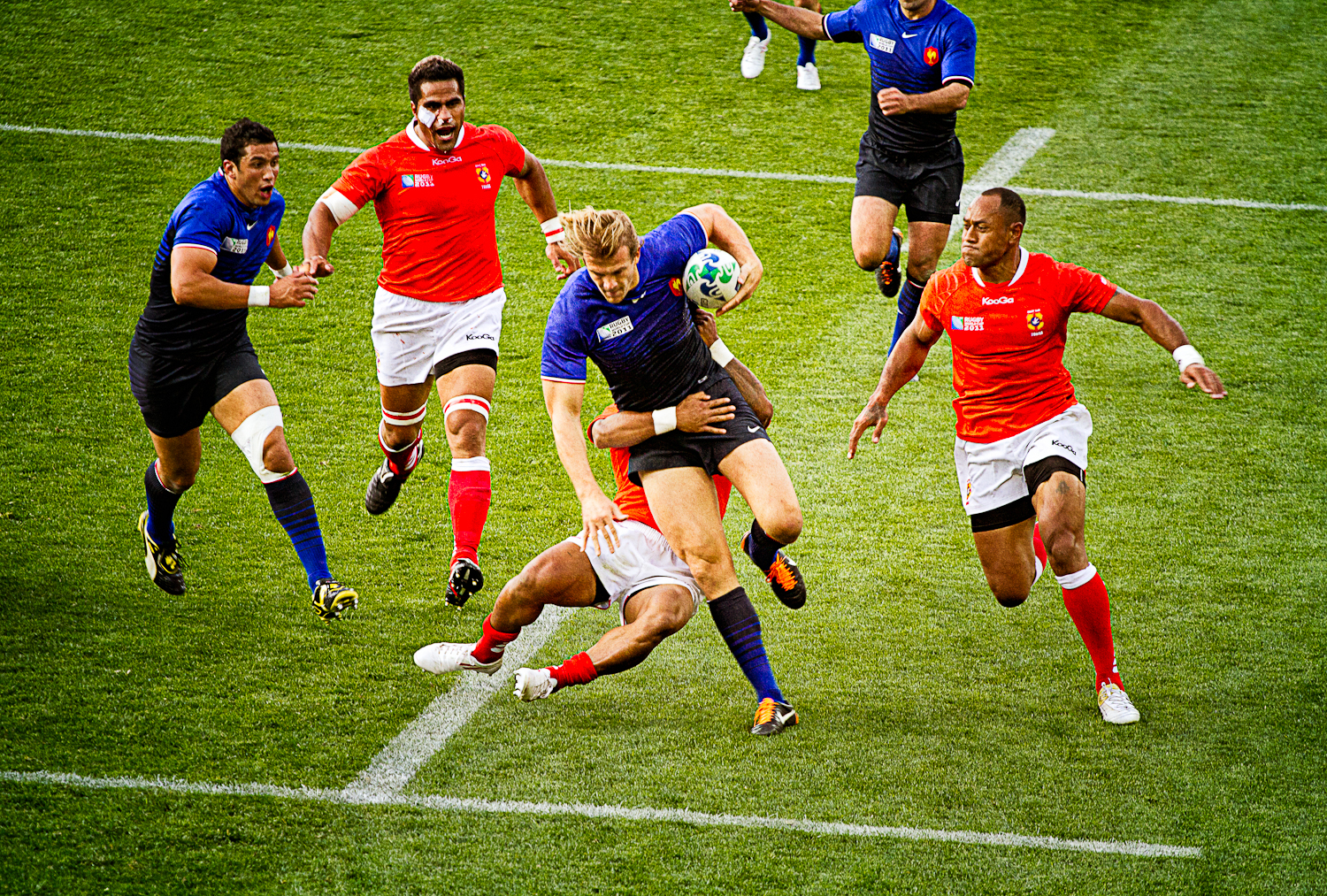

Man of the Match:
Sione Kalamafoni (Tonga)

Touch judges:
Dave Pearson (England)
Carlo Damasco (Italy)
Television match official:
Matt Goddard (Australia)

=== New Zealand vs Canada ===
2 October 2011
15:30

New Zealand	79–15	Canada
Try: Guildford (4) 7' c, 25' m, 35' m, 77' c Vito (2) 11' m, 80+' c Dagg 20' m Muliaina 29' c Cowan 44' c Kaino (2) 52' c, 68' c S. Williams 60' c Con: Slade (4/8); Weepu (4/4); Pen: Slade (1/1) 16'	Report	Try: Trainor (2) 40+' m, 42' c Con: Monro (1/2); Pen: Monro (1/1) 2'

Wellington Regional Stadium, Wellington
Attendance: 37,665
Referee: Romain Poite (France)

FB	15	Mils Muliaina	(substituted off) 51'
RW	14	Israel Dagg	(substituted off) 48'
OC	13	Conrad Smith
IC	12	Sonny Bill Williams
LW	11	Zac Guildford
FH	10	Colin Slade	(substituted off) 65'
SH	9	Jimmy Cowan	(substituted off) 63'
N8	8	Kieran Read	(substituted off) 51'
OF	7	Victor Vito
BF	6	Jerome Kaino
RL	5	Ali Williams
LL	4	Sam Whitelock
TP	3	Owen Franks	(substituted off) 56'	(substituted in) 74'
HK	2	Andrew Hore (c)	(substituted off) 78'
LP	1	Tony Woodcock		(substituted off) 74'
Replacements:
HK	16	Keven Mealamu	(substituted in) 78'
PR	17	Ben Franks	(substituted in) 56'
LK	18	Brad Thorn	(substituted in) 65'
LK	19	Anthony Boric	(substituted in) 51'
SH	20	Andy Ellis	(substituted in) 63'
SH	21	Piri Weepu	(substituted in) 51'
FB	22	Isaia Toeava	(substituted in) 48'
Coach:
Graham Henry

FB	15	Matt Evans	(substituted off) 65'
RW	14	Conor Trainor
OC	13	D. T. H. van der Merwe	(substituted off) 31'
IC	12	Ryan Smith
LW	11	Phil Mackenzie
FH	10	Ander Monro
SH	9	Ed Fairhurst	(substituted off) 63'
N8	8	Aaron Carpenter
OF	7	Chauncey O'Toole
BF	6	Adam Kleeberger		(substituted off) 73'
RL	5	Jamie Cudmore	(substituted off) 61'	(substituted in) 73'
LL	4	Jebb Sinclair
TP	3	Jason Marshall	(substituted off) 53'
HK	2	Pat Riordan (c)	(substituted off) 48'
LP	1	Hubert Buydens	(substituted off) 63'
Replacements:
HK	16	Ryan Hamilton	(substituted in) 48'
PR	17	Scott Franklin	(substituted in) 53'
PR	18	Andrew Tiedemann	(substituted in) 63'
LK	19	Tyler Hotson	(substituted in) 61'
FL	20	Nanyak Dala	(substituted in) 65'
SH	21	Sean White	(substituted in) 31'
FH	22	Nathan Hirayama	(substituted in) 63'
Coach:
(New Zealand) Kieran Crowley

Man of the Match:
Jerome Kaino (New Zealand)

Touch judges:
Steve Walsh (Australia)
Carlo Damasco (Italy)
Television match official:
Matt Goddard (Australia)
