= 2011 Rugby World Cup warm-up matches =

Throughout July and August 2011, various teams played Test match and non-test match fixtures for the 2011 Rugby World Cup in New Zealand. The matches were primarily in the Northern Hemisphere involving the Six Nations Championship teams. Although Tier 2 European sides did play some fixtures against domestic clubs from the Aviva Premiership and Pro12.

== Fixtures ==
6 August 2011
14:30 BST (UTC+01)

England	23–19	Wales
Try: Haskell 24' c Tuilagi 42' c Con: Wilkinson (2/2); Pen: Wilkinson (1/2) 5'; Drop: Wilkinson (2) 37', 60'	Report	Try: North (2) 16' c, 75' c Sh. Williams 56' m Con: Priestland (2/3)

Twickenham Stadium, London
Attendance: 80,945
Referee: Steve Walsh (Australia)

FB	15	Delon Armitage
RW	14	Matt Banahan
OC	13	Manu Tuilagi	(substituted off) 59'
IC	12	Riki Flutey
LW	11	Mark Cueto
FH	10	Jonny Wilkinson	(substituted off) 76'
SH	9	Danny Care	(substituted off) 57'
N8	8	James Haskell
OF	7	Lewis Moody (c)	(substituted off) 59'
BF	6	Tom Croft
RL	5	Tom Palmer
LL	4	Simon Shaw	(substituted off) 57'
TP	3	Matt Stevens	(substituted off) 57'	(substituted on) 69'
HK	2	Dylan Hartley	(substituted off) 57'
LP	1	Alex Corbisiero		(substituted off) 69'
Replacements:
HK	16	Lee Mears	(substituted on) 57'
PR	17	David Wilson	(substituted on) 57'
LK	18	Mouritz Botha	(substituted on) 57'
FL	19	Tom Wood	(substituted on) 59'
SH	20	Richard Wigglesworth	(substituted on) 57'
FH	21	Charlie Hodgson	(substituted on) 76'
CE	22	Charlie Sharples	(substituted on) 59'
Coach:
(England) Martin Johnson

FB	15	Morgan Stoddart	(substituted off) 48'
RW	14	George North
OC	13	Jonathan Davies
IC	12	Jamie Roberts
LW	11	Shane Williams
FH	10	Rhys Priestland
SH	9	Mike Phillips	(substituted off) 61'
N8	8	Taulupe Faletau	(substituted off) 54'
OF	7	Sam Warburton (c)
BF	6	Dan Lydiate
RL	5	Alun Wyn Jones	(substituted off) 65'
LL	4	Bradley Davies
TP	3	Craig Mitchell
HK	2	Huw Bennett	(substituted off) 64'
LP	1	Paul James	(substituted off) 65'
Replacements:
HK	16	Lloyd Burns	(substituted on) 64'
PR	17	Ryan Bevington	(substituted on) 65'
LK	18	Luke Charteris	(substituted on) 65'
FL	19	Ryan Jones	(substituted on) 54'
SH	20	Tavis Knoyle	(substituted on) 61'
FB	21	Scott Williams	(substituted on) 48'
CE	22	Lloyd Williams
Coach:
(New Zealand) Warren Gatland

Touch judges:
(Ireland) George Clancy
(Scotland) David Changleng
Television match official:
(Scotland) Jim Yullie

6 August 2011
15:00 BST (UTC+01)

Scotland	10–6	Ireland
Try: Ansbro 77' c Con: Jackson (1/1); Pen: Paterson (1/2) 49'	Report	Pen: Sexton (2/3) 31', 64'

Murrayfield Stadium, Edinburgh
Attendance: 28,288
Referee: Wayne Barnes (England)

FB	15	Chris Paterson	(substituted off) 70'
RW	14	Nikki Walker
OC	13	Joe Ansbro
IC	12	Graeme Morrison
LW	11	Sean Lamont
FH	10	Ruaridh Jackson
SH	9	Rory Lawson (c)	(substituted off) 70'
N8	8	Johnnie Beattie	(substituted off) 57'
OF	7	Ross Rennie
BF	6	Alasdair Strokosch
RL	5	Richie Gray
LL	4	Jim Hamilton	(substituted off) 57'
TP	3	Geoff Cross
HK	2	Ross Ford	(substituted off) 70'
LP	1	Allan Jacobsen	(substituted off) 57'
Replacements:
HK	16	Dougie Hall	(substituted on) 70'
PR	17	Alasdair Dickinson	(substituted on) 57'
LK	18	Alastair Kellock	(substituted on) 57'
FL	19	David Denton	(substituted on) 57'
SH	20	Greig Laidlaw	(substituted on) 70'
CE	21	Nick De Luca	(substituted on) 70'
WG	22	Jack Cuthbert
Coach:
(England) Andy Robinson

FB	15	Rob Kearney
RW	14	Andrew Trimble
OC	13	Fergus McFadden
IC	12	Paddy Wallace
LW	11	Luke Fitzgerald	(substituted off) 62'
FH	10	Johnny Sexton
SH	9	Tomás O'Leary	(substituted off) 60'
N8	8	Denis Leamy
OF	7	Niall Ronan
BF	6	Mike McCarthy
RL	5	Leo Cullen (c)	(substituted off) 61'
LL	4	Donnacha Ryan	(substituted off) 52'
TP	3	Tony Buckley	(substituted off) 60'
HK	2	Seán Cronin	(substituted off) 60'
LP	1	Tom Court	(substituted off) 62'
Replacements:
HK	16	Jerry Flannery	(substituted on) 60'
PR	17	Marcus Horan	(substituted on) 62'
PR	18	John Hayes	(substituted on) 60'
LK	19	Mick O'Driscoll	(substituted on) 61'
FL	20	Kevin McLaughlin	(substituted on) 52'
SH	21	Isaac Boss	(substituted on) 60'
FB	22	Felix Jones	(substituted on) 62'
Coach:
(Ireland) Declan Kidney

Touch judges:
(England) Dave Pearson
(England) Stuart Terheege
Television match official:
(England) Graham Warren

6 August 2011
14:00 EDT (UTC-04)

Canada	28–22	United States
Try: Sinclair 6' c Mackenzie 44' c Fairhurst 59' m Con: Pritchard (2/3); Pen: Pritchard (3/3) 38', 55', 78'	Report	Try: Ngwenya 23' c Clever (2) 34' m, 77' c Con: Malifa (1/2); Enosa (1/1); Pen: Malifa (1/2) 10'

BMO Field, Toronto
Attendance: 10,621
Referee: Mark Lawrence (South Africa)

FB	15	Matt Evans	(substituted off) 16'
RW	14	Phil Mackenzie
OC	13	D. T. H. van der Merwe
IC	12	Mike Scholz	(substituted off) 75'
LW	11	James Pritchard
FH	10	Ander Monro
SH	9	Ed Fairhurst
N8	8	Aaron Carpenter
OF	7	Chauncey O'Toole
BF	6	Jebb Sinclair	(substituted off) 71'
RL	5	Brian Erichsen	(substituted off) 75'
LL	4	Jamie Cudmore
TP	3	Jason Marshall
HK	2	Pat Riordan (c)	(substituted off) 80'
LP	1	Hubert Buydens	64' to 69'
Replacements:
HK	16	Ryan Hamilton	(substituted on) 80'
PR	17	Scott Franklin	(substituted on) 64'	(substituted off) 69'
LK	18	Tyler Hotson	(substituted on) 75'
FL	19	Adam Kleeberger	(substituted on) 71'
SH	20	Sean White
CE	21	Ryan Smith	(substituted on) 75'
WG	22	Ciaran Hearn	(substituted on) 16'
Coach:
(New Zealand) Kieran Crowley

FB	15	Blaine Scully
RW	14	Takudzwa Ngwenya
OC	13	Paul Emerick
IC	12	Andrew Suniula
LW	11	Kevin Swiryn	(substituted off) 75'
FH	10	Nese Malifa	(substituted off) 46'
SH	9	Mike Petri	(substituted off) 55'
N8	8	Nic Johnson
OF	7	Todd Clever (c)
BF	6	Louis Stanfill
RL	5	Hayden Smith
LL	4	John van der Giessen	(substituted off) 59'
TP	3	Shawn Pittman
HK	2	Phil Thiel	(substituted off) 78'
LP	1	Matekitonga Moeakiola	(substituted off) 57'
Replacements:
HK	16	Chris Biller	(substituted on) 78'
PR	17	Eric Fry	(substituted on) 57'
LK	18	Inaki Basauri	(substituted on) 59'
FL	19	JJ Gagiano
SH	20	Tim Usasz	(substituted on) 55'
CE	21	Roland Suniula	(substituted on) 46'
FH	22	Tai Enosa	(substituted on) 75'
Coach:
(Ireland) Eddie O'Sullivan

6 August 2011
15:30 ART (UTC-03)

Argentina	78–15	South American XV
	Report

Estadio San Juan del Bicentenario, San Juan
Referee: Javier Mancuso (Argentina)

12 August 2011
19:30 BST (UTC+01)

Northampton Saints (England)	54–19	Russia
	Report

Franklin's Gardens, Northampton
Attendance: 6,227
Referee: Wayne Barnes (England)

13 August 2011
15:30 (UTC+12:00)

Fiji	27–12	Tonga
Try: Goneva; Nasiga; Murimurivalu; Con: Bai (3/3); Pen: Bai (2/2)	Report	Try: Iongi (2); Con: Fisilau (1/2)

Churchill Park, Lautoka
Attendance: 3,300
Referee: Keith Brown (New Zealand)

FB	15	Kini Murimurivalu
RW	14	Vereniki Goneva
OC	13	Albert Vulivuli
IC	12	Seremaia Bai
LW	11	Adriu Delai
FH	10	Waisea Luveniyali
SH	9	Vitori Buatava
N8	8	Sisa Koyamaibole
OF	7	Malakai Ravulo
BF	6	Dominiko Waqaniburotu
RL	5	Wame Lewaravu
LL	4	Rupeni Nasiga
TP	3	Deacon Manu (c)
HK	2	Sunia Koto
LP	1	Campese Ma'afu
Replacements:
HK	16	Viliame Veikoso
PR	17	Waisea Daveta Naulago
LK	18	Josefa Domolailai
N8	19	Sakiusa Matadigo
SH	20	Waisale Vatuvoka
FH	21	Ravai Fatiaki
WG	22	Iliesa Keresoni
Coach:
(Fiji) Sam Domoni

FB	15	Viliame Iongi
RW	14	Fetuʻu Vainikolo
OC	13	Suka Hufanga
IC	12	Andrew Mailei
LW	11	Viliami Helu
FH	10	Samisoni Fisilau
SH	9	Taniela Moa
N8	8	Viliame Maʻafu
OF	7	Sione Vaiomounga
BF	6	Sione Kalamafoni
RL	5	Kele Hehea
LL	4	Lua Lokotui
TP	3	Halani Aulika
HK	2	Aleki Lutui (c)
LP	1	Sona Taumalolo
Replacements:
HK	16	Ephraim Taukafa
PR	17	Tonga Leaʻaetoa
LK	18	Sione Timani
N8	19	Samiu Vahafolau
SH	20	Tomasi Palu
FH	21	Siale Piutau
WG	22	Vunga Lilo
Coach:
(New Zealand) Isitolo Maka

13 August 2011
14:30 BST (UTC+01)

Wales	19–9	England
Try: Hook 58' c Con: Hook; Pen: Priestland (2); Hook (2)	Report	Pen: Flood (3)

Millennium Stadium, Cardiff
Attendance: 73,307
Referee: Alain Rolland (Ireland)

FB	15	James Hook
RW	14	George North
OC	13	Jamie Roberts	(yellow card) 40'
IC	12	Gavin Henson		(substituted off) 31'
LW	11	Shane Williams
FH	10	Rhys Priestland		(substituted off) 40'
SH	9	Mike Philips (yellow card) 70'
N8	8	Taulupe Faletau
OF	7	Sam Warburton (c)
BF	6	Dan Lydiate
RL	5	Alun Wyn Jones		(substituted off) 60'
LL	4	Luke Charteris
TP	3	Craig Mitchell			(substituted off) 77'
HK	2	Lloyd Burns		(substituted off) 52'
LP	1	Paul James		(substituted off) 69'	(substituted on) 77'
Replacements:
HK	16	Huw Bennett		(substituted on) 52'
PR	17	Ryan Bevington		(substituted on) 69'
LK	18	Josh Turnbull		(substituted on) 60'
FL	19	Justin Tipuric
SH	20	Tavis Knoyle
CE	21	Scott Williams		(substituted on) 31'
WG	22	Aled Brew		(substituted on) 40'
Coach:
(New Zealand) Warren Gatland

FB	15	Ben Foden
RW	14	Matt Banahan		(substituted off) 69'
OC	13	Mike Tindall (c)	(substituted off) 59'	(substituted on) 69'
IC	12	Shontayne Hape
LW	11	Mark Cueto
FH	10	Toby Flood	(substituted off) 67'
SH	9	Richard Wigglesworth	(substituted off) 29'
N8	8	Nick Easter
OF	7	Hendre Fourie	(substituted off) 50'
BF	6	Tom Wood
RL	5	Courtney Lawes
LL	4	Louis Deacon	(substituted off) 67'
TP	3	Dan Cole
HK	2	Steve Thompson	(substituted off) 59'
LP	1	Alex Corbisiero	(substituted off) 59'
Replacements:
HK	16	Lee Mears	(substituted on) 59'
PR	17	Matt Stevens	(substituted on) 59'
LK	18	Tom Palmer	(substituted on) 67'
FL	19	James Haskell	(substituted on) 50'
SH	20	Danny Care	(substituted on) 29'
FH	21	Charlie Hodgson	(substituted on) 67'
WG	22	Delon Armitage	(substituted on) 59'
Team manager:
(England) Martin Johnson

13 August 2011
18:00 CEST (UTC+02)

Aurillac (France)	24–28	Georgia
	Report

Stade Jean Alric, Aurillac

13 August 2011
20:30 CEST (UTC+02)

France	19–12	Ireland
Try: Clerc 17' c Con: Yachvili (1/1); Pen: Yachvili (4/4) 3', 27', 66', 70'	Report	Pen: O'Gara (4/5) 38', 47', 52', 58'

Stade Chaban-Delmas, Bordeaux
Attendance: 32,653
Referee: Steve Walsh (Australia)

FB	15	Damien Traille	(substituted off) 64'
RW	14	Vincent Clerc
OC	13	David Marty
IC	12	Maxime Mermoz	(substituted off) 26'
LW	11	Alexis Palisson
FH	10	François Trinh-Duc
SH	9	Dimitri Yachvili	(substituted off) 77'
N8	8	Raphaël Lakafia
OF	7	Imanol Harinordoquy	(substituted off) 64'
BF	6	Thierry Dusautoir (c)
RL	5	Romain Millo-Chluski	(substituted off) 58'
LL	4	Julien Pierre
TP	3	Luc Ducalcon
HK	2	Dimitri Szarzewski	(substituted off) 54'
LP	1	Sylvain Marconnet	(substituted off) 54'
Replacements:
HK	16	Guilhem Guirado	(substituted on) 54'
PR	17	Jean-Baptiste Poux	(substituted on) 54'
LK	18	Lionel Nallet	(substituted on) 58'
FL	19	Julien Bonnaire	(substituted on) 64'
SH	20	Morgan Parra	(substituted on) 77'
CE	21	David Skrela	(substituted on) 26'
FB	22	Maxime Médard	(substituted on) 64'
Coach:
(France) Marc Lièvremont

FB	15	Rob Kearney	(substituted off) 46'
RW	14	Andrew Trimble	(substituted off) 67'
OC	13	Keith Earls
IC	12	Paddy Wallace
LW	11	Luke Fitzgerald
FH	10	Ronan O'Gara
SH	9	Eoin Reddan	(substituted off) 60'
N8	8	Denis Leamy	(substituted off) 50'
OF	7	Seán O'Brien
BF	6	Donnacha Ryan
RL	5	Leo Cullen (c)	(substituted off) 50'
LL	4	Donncha O'Callaghan
TP	3	Mike Ross		(substituted off) 69'
HK	2	Rory Best	(substituted off) 60'
LP	1	Cian Healy	(substituted off) 51'	(substituted on) 69'
Replacements:
HK	16	Jerry Flannery	(substituted on) 60'
PR	17	Tony Buckley	(substituted on) 51'
LK	18	Paul O'Connell	(substituted on) 50'
N8	19	Jamie Heaslip	(substituted on) 50'
SH	20	Conor Murray	(substituted on) 60'
WG	21	Fergus McFadden	(substituted on) 67'
FB	22	Felix Jones	(substituted on) 46'
Coach:
(Ireland) Declan Kidney

13 August 2011
20:45 CEST (UTC+02)

Italy	31–24	Japan
Try: Pratichetti 3' c Gori 10' c Ghiraldini 44' c Lo Cicero 57' c Con: Bocchino (3/3); Orquera (1/1); Pen: Orquera (1/1) 73'	Report	Try: Usuzuki 22' c Taira 28' c Penalty try 63' c Con: Arlidge (3/3); Pen: Arlidge (1/1) 38'

Stadio Dino Manuzzi, Cesena
Attendance: 14,800
Referee: Romain Poite (France)

FB	15	Luke McLean
RW	14	Giulio Toniolatti
OC	13	Alberto Sgarbi		(substituted off) 56'
IC	12	Matteo Pratichetti
LW	11	Tommaso Benvenuti
FH	10	Riccardo Bocchino		(substituted off) 56'
SH	9	Edoardo Gori		(substituted off) 49'
N8	8	Sergio Parisse (c)
OF	7	Mauro Bergamasco
BF	6	Alessandro Zanni		(substituted off) 53'
RL	5	Marco Bortolami
LL	4	Quintin Geldenhuys		(substituted off) 31'
TP	3	Lorenzo Cittadini		(substituted off) 53'
HK	2	Leonardo Ghiraldini		(substituted off) 76'
LP	1	Andrea Lo Cicero	(yellow card) 62'
Replacements:
HK	16	Tommaso D'Apice		(substituted on) 76'
PR	17	Martín Castrogiovanni		(substituted on) 53'
LK	18	Corniel van Zyl		(substituted on) 31'
FL	19	Paul Derbyshire		(substituted on) 53'
SH	20	Pablo Canavosio		(substituted on) 49'
FH	21	Luciano Orquera		(substituted on) 56'
CE	22	Gonzalo Canale		(substituted on) 56'
Coach:
(South Africa) Nick Mallet

FB	15	Shaun Webb
RW	14	Kosuke Endo
OC	13	Koji Taira		(substituted off) 53'
IC	12	Ryan Nicholas
LW	11	Takehisa Usuzuki
FH	10	James Arlidge
SH	9	Fumiaki Tanaka		(substituted off) 69'
N8	8	Koliniasi Holani
OF	7	Michael Leitch
BF	6	Takashi Kikutani (c)		(substituted off) 77'
RL	5	Toshizumi Kitagawa
LL	4	Justin Ives		(substituted off) 17'
TP	3	Kensuke Hatakeyama		(substituted off) 52'	(substituted on) 76'
HK	2	Shota Horie
LP	1	Hisateru Hirashima	(yellow card) 73'
Replacements:
HK	16	Hiroki Yuhara
PR	17	Nozomu Fujita		(substituted on) 52'	(substituted off) 76'
LK	18	Luke Thompson		(substituted on) 17'
FL	19	Tadasuke Nishihara		(substituted on) 77'
SH	20	Atsushi Hiwasa		(substituted on) 69'
CE	21	Alisi Tupuailei		(substituted on) 53'
FB	22	Murray Williams
Coach:
(New Zealand) John Kirwan

13 August 2011
19:15 MDT (UTC-06)

United States	7–27	Canada
Try: Scully 38' c Con: Malifa (1/1)	Report	Try: Van der Merwe 4' c Carpenter 60' c P. Mackenzie 71' c Con: Pritchard (3/3); Pen: Pritchard (2) 12', 53'

Infinity Park, Glendale
Attendance: 5,000
Referee: Mark Lawrence (South Africa)

FB	15	Blaine Scully
RW	14	Takudzwa Ngwenya
OC	13	Paul Emerick		(substituted off) 77'
IC	12	Andrew Suniula
LW	11	Colin Hawley
FH	10	Nese Malifa		(substituted off) 62'
SH	9	Tim Usasz		(substituted off) 67'
N8	8	Nic Johnson
OF	7	Todd Clever (c)
BF	6	Louis Stanfill		(substituted off) 54'	(substituted on) 63'
RL	5	Hayden Smith		(substituted off) 67'
LL	4	John van der Giessen
TP	3	Shawn Pittman
HK	2	Chris Biller	(yellow card) 52'
LP	1	Mike MacDonald
Replacements:
HK	16	Phil Thiel		(substituted on) 54'	(substituted off) 63'
PR	17	Eric Fry		(substituted on) 73'
LK	18	Scott LaValla		(substituted on) 67'
FL	19	JJ Gagiano
SH	20	Mike Petri		(substituted on) 67'
FH	21	Roland Suniula		(substituted on) 62'
CE	22	Tai Enosa		(substituted on) 77'
Coach:
(Ireland) Eddie O'Sullivan

FB	15	James Pritchard
RW	14	Ciaran Hearn
OC	13	D. T. H. van der Merwe
IC	12	Mike Scholz		(substituted off) 66'
LW	11	Phil Mackenzie
FH	10	Ander Monro		(substituted off) 74'
SH	9	Sean White		(substituted off) 77'
N8	8	Aaron Carpenter
OF	7	Chauncey O'Toole	(yellow card) 25'		(substituted off) 52'
BF	6	Adam Kleeberger
RL	5	Jamie Cudmore	(yellow card) 18'	(substituted off) 74'
LL	4	Jebb Sinclair		42' to 52'
TP	3	Jason Marshall		(substituted off) 65'
HK	2	Pat Riordan (c)		(substituted off) 65'
LP	1	Hubert Buydens
Replacements:
HK	16	Ryan Hamilton		(substituted on) 65'
PR	17	Andrew Tiedemann		(substituted on) 65'
LK	18	Brian Erichsen		(substituted on) 74'
FL	19	Tyler Hotson		(substituted on) 42'
SH	20	Jamie Mackenzie		(substituted on) 77'
CE	21	Ryan Smith		(substituted on) 66'
FH	22	Nathan Hirayama		(substituted on) 74'
Coach:
(New Zealand) Kieran Crowley

17 August 2011
19:00 BST (UTC+01)

Newport Gwent Dragons (Wales)	40–12	Russia
	Report

Rodney Parade, Newport
Attendance: 2,565
Referee: Nigel Owens (Wales)

18 August 2011
18:30 IST (UTC+01)

Ireland	38–3	(Republic of Ireland) Connacht
	Report

Donnybrook Stadium, Dublin
Attendance: 3,168
Referee: Peter Fitzgibbon (Ireland)

19 August 2011
18:00 CEST (UTC+02)

Bourgoin-Jallieu (France)	15–28	Georgia
	Report (in French)

Stade Jacques-Lavédrine, Issoire

19 August 2011
16:30 (UTC+12:00)

Fiji	20–32	Tonga
	Report

Churchill Park, Lautoka
Referee: Chris Pollock (New Zealand)

- Fiji won the two-test Pinjas Rugby Series on points difference.

20 August 2011
14:30 BST (UTC+01)

Wales	28–13	Argentina
Try: Powell 36' c A. W. Jones 38' c North 71' m Con: Hook (2); Pen: Hook (3) 44', 54',80+2'	Report	Try: Scelzo 76' c Con: Contepomi; Pen: Contepomi (2) 29', 62'

Millennium Stadium, Cardiff
Referee: Romain Poite (France)

20 August 2011
17:00 IST (UTC+01)

Ireland	22–26	France
Try: Healy 8' m Sexton 72' c O'Brien 80' c Con: O'Gara (2/2) 74', 80'; Pen: Sexton (1/1) 2'	Report	Try: Heymans 30' c Trinh-Duc 48' c Con: Parra (2/2) 30', 49'; Pen: Parra (3/3) 25', 38', 44'; Drop: Trinh-Duc 27'

Aviva Stadium, Dublin
Referee: Jonathan Kaplan (South Africa)

FB	15	Felix Jones	(substituted off) 68'
RW	14	Andrew Trimble
OC	13	Brian O'Driscoll (c)
IC	12	Gordon D'Arcy	(substituted off) 67'
LW	11	Keith Earls
FH	10	Johnny Sexton
SH	9	Tomás O'Leary	(substituted off) 53'
N8	8	Jamie Heaslip
OF	7	Shane Jennings	(substituted off) 60'
BF	6	Seán O'Brien
RL	5	Paul O'Connell
LL	4	Donncha O'Callaghan	(substituted off) 75'
TP	3	Mike Ross
HK	2	Rory Best	(substituted off) 60'
LP	1	Cian Healy	(substituted off) 50'
Replacements:
HK	16	Jerry Flannery	(substituted on) 60'
PR	17	Tom Court	(substituted on) 50'
LK	18	Mike McCarthy	(substituted on) 75'
FL	19	Stephen Ferris	(substituted on) 60'
SH	20	Eoin Reddan	(substituted on) 53'
FH	21	Ronan O'Gara	(substituted on) 67'
WG	22	Luke Fitzgerald	(substituted on) 68'
Coach:
(Ireland) Declan Kidney

FB	15	Cédric Heymans
RW	14	Maxime Médard
OC	13	Aurélien Rougerie	(substituted off) 72'
IC	12	Fabrice Estebanez
LW	11	Alexis Palisson
FH	10	David Skrela	(substituted off) 13'
SH	9	Morgan Parra	(substituted off) 78'
N8	8	Louis Picamoles
OF	7	Julien Bonnaire
BF	6	Fulgence Ouedraogo
RL	5	Lionel Nallet (c)
LL	4	Pascal Papé	(substituted off) 60'
TP	3	Nicolas Mas
HK	2	Dimitri Szarzewski	(substituted off) 53'
LP	1	Jean-Baptiste Poux	(substituted off) 40'
Replacements:
HK	16	Guilhem Guirado	(substituted on) 53'
PR	17	Fabien Barcella	(substituted on) 40'
LK	18	Julien Pierre	(substituted on) 60'
N8	19	Raphaël Lakafia
SH	20	Dimitri Yachvili	(substituted on) 78'
FH	21	François Trinh-Duc	(substituted on) 13'
WG	22	Vincent Clerc	(substituted on) 72'
Coach:
(France) Marc Lièvremont

20 August 2011
17:00 BST (UTC+01)

Scotland	23–12	Italy
	Report

Murrayfield Stadium, Edinburgh
Attendance: 20,245
Referee: Dave Pearson (England)

20 August 2011
14:00 EEST (UTC+03)

Ukraine	16–41	Romania
	Report (in Romanian)

Yunist Stadium

- This game is part of the European Nations Cup .

21 August 2011
19:07 JST (UTC+09)

Japan	20–14	United States
Try: Ueda 6' m Kikutani 54' c Usuzuki 66' m Con: Webb (1/2); Pen: Nicholas (1/1) 11'	Report	Try: Swiryn (2) 8' c, 39' c Con: Malifa (2/2)

Chichibunomiya Rugby Stadium, Tokyo
Attendance: 12,519
Referee: Jérôme Garces (France)

FB	15	Taihei Ueda
RW	14	Takehisa Usuzuki
OC	13	Alisi Tupuailei
IC	12	Ryan Nicholas
LW	11	Hirotoki Onozawa
FH	10	Murray Williams
SH	9	Tomoki Yoshida
N8	8	Takashi Kikutani (c)
OF	7	Tadasuke Nishihara
BF	6	Sione Vatuvei
RL	5	Luke Thompson
LL	4	Hitoshi Ono
TP	3	Nozomu Fujita
HK	2	Yusuke Aoki
LP	1	Naoki Kawamata
Replacements:
HK	16	Shota Horie
PR	17	Kensuke Hatakeyama
LK	18	Toshizumi Kitagawa
FL	19	Itaru Taniguchi
SH	20	Atsushi Hiwasa
CE	21	Koji Taira
FB	22	Shaun Webb
Coach:
(New Zealand) John Kirwan

FB	15	Blaine Scully
RW	14	Kevin Swiryn
OC	13	Tai Enosa
IC	12	Paul Emerick
LW	11	James Paterson
FH	10	Nese Malifa
SH	9	Mike Petri (c)
N8	8	JJ Gagiano
OF	7	Louis Stanfill
BF	6	Pat Danahy
RL	5	Hayden Smith
LL	4	Scott LaValla
TP	3	Eric Fry
HK	2	Phil Thiel
LP	1	Mike MacDonald
Replacements:
HK	16	Chris Biller
PR	17	Shawn Pittman
FL	18	Nic Johnson
FL	19	Ryan Chapman
SH	20	Tim Usasz
CE	21	Roland Suniula
CE	22	Andrew Suniula
Coach:
(Ireland) Eddie O'Sullivan

21 August 2011
15:00 BST (UTC+01)

Ospreys (Wales)	46–19	Russia
	Report

Liberty Stadium, Swansea

23 August 2011
19:45 BST (UTC+01)

Worcester Warriors (England)	15–21	Argentina
	Report

Sixways Stadium, Worcester
Attendance: 6,107

25 August 2011
19:30 CEST (UTC+02)

Périgueux (France)	20–7	Romania
	Report (in Romanian)

Stade Francis Rongieras, Périgueux

26 August 2011
19:30 AEST (UTC+10)

Australian Barbarians (Australia)	38–14	Canada
	Report

Skilled Park, Gold Coast
Attendance: 4,122

26 August 2011
19:45 BST (UTC+01)

Gloucester (England)	47–7	Russia
	Report

Kingsholm, England
Attendance: 4,951

27 August 2011
14:30 IST (UTC+01)

Ireland	9–20	England
Pen: O'Gara (3/4)	Report	Try: Tuilagi 5' c Armitage 46' c Con: Wilkinson (2/2); Pen: Wilkinson (2/2)

Aviva Stadium, Dublin
Attendance: 48,523
Referee: Nigel Owens (Wales)

== See also ==
- 2011 mid-year rugby union tests
- 2011 Rugby World Cup
