= Bryan Erickson =

Bryan Erickson may refer to:

- Bryan Erickson (musician), musician behind Velvet Acid Christ
- Bryan Erickson (ice hockey) (born 1960), NHL ice hockey player

== See also ==
- Brian Erichsen, Canadian rugby union player
