= Ryan Nicholas =

Japan international rugby union player

- Born: Ryan Tamarua Nicholas; 23 May 1979 (age 47) Broken Hill, NSW, Australia
- Height: 190 cm (6 ft 3 in)
- Weight: 100 kg (15 st 10 lb; 220 lb)
- School: Tauranga Boys' College
- University: Otago University

Rugby union career
- Position: Centre
Senior career
Years	Team	Apps	(Points)
1998–2004	Otago		
2005–2015	Suntory Sungoliath	120	(1336)
2015–2017	Mitsubishi Sagamihara DynaBoars	8	(64)
Super Rugby
Years	Team	Apps	(Points)
2002–2004	Highlanders	24	(35)
International career
Years	Team	Apps	(Points)
2008–2012	Japan	38	(193)

Ryan Tamarua Nicholas (born 23 May 1979 in Broken Hill, New South Wales, Australia) is an Australian-born Japanese rugby union player who plays for Suntory Sungoliath of the Top League in Japan. In July 2011, he received Japanese citizenship. Although he is of Cook Island Maori heritage, he has played internationally for Japan since 2008.

== Playing career ==
=== New Zealand ===
Born in Australia, Nicholas moved to New Zealand in his youth and attended Tauranga Boys' College. He moved south to attend the University of Otago and made his provincial rugby debut for Otago as a teenager in 1998.

By 2001, Nicholas was a key player in the Otago side and earned a contract with the Highlanders for the 2002 Super 12 season. He would go on to have an outstanding debut season, starting all 12 contests and leading the side with 7 tries (one more than All Black great Jeff Wilson). His exploits helped the Highlanders to an 8-3 record and semi-finals berth.

Nicholas would be unable to play in the Highlanders squad for the 2005 Super 12 season as he signed with suntory sungoliath based in Tokyo Japan

=== Japan ===
In 2005, Nicholas joined Japanese Top League club Suntory Sungoliath. While his goal-kicking opportunities were limited in New Zealand, as he was behind All Blacks Nick Evans and Tony Brown in the pecking order for Otago and the Highlanders, he was given an opportunity in Japan to become his team's main kicking option, and by the 2006-07 season was the top points scorer in the Top League.

Nicholas signed with the Queensland Reds for the 2007 Super 14 season, but the move fell through on the eve of the season and he chose to remain in Japan.

In the 2010-11 season, Nicholas scored 126 points in helping Suntory Sungoliath to their first All-Japan Championship since 2001.

=== International play ===
As Nicholas had never represented New Zealand or Australia internationally, he qualified to play for Japan and was selected in February 2008 as a member of the Japan national squad of 52 players.

Nicholas has developed into a key player and one of the regular goal kickers (along with former Otago and Highlander teammate James Arlidge) for the Japanese squad, and earned his 25th cap against the United Arab Emirates on 13 May 2011.

Nicholas retired from international rugby at the end of the 2012 season.
