= Viliami Maʻafu =

Tongan rugby player (born 1982)

Viliami Ma'afu
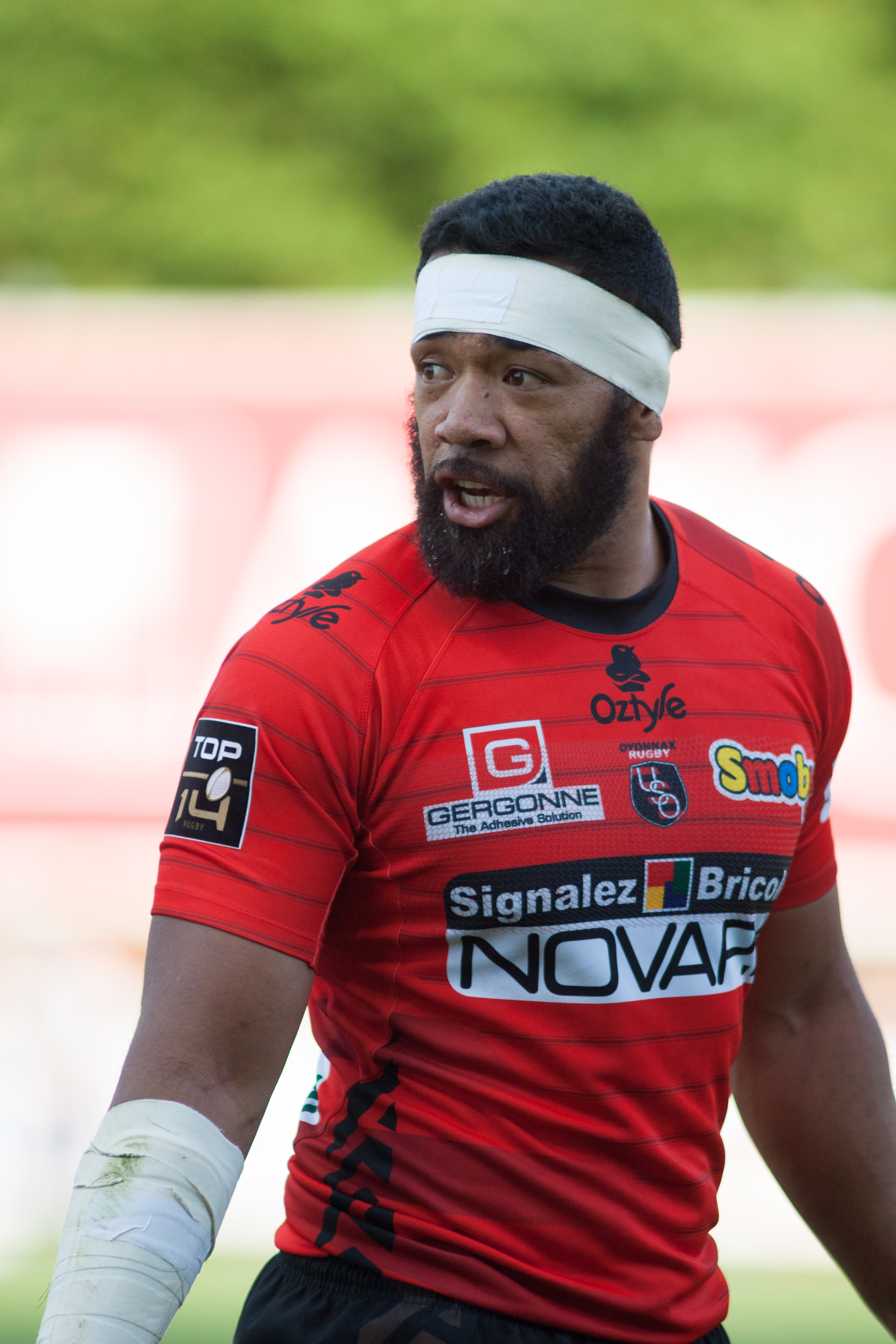
- Born: Viliami S. Ma'afu; 9 March 1982 (age 44) Longolongo, Tonga
- Height: 1.86 m (6 ft 1 in)
- Weight: 100 kg (15 st 10 lb; 220 lb)

Rugby union career
- Position: Number 8
Senior career
| Years | Team | Apps | (Points) |
| 2010–2012 | Mitsubishi DynaBoars | | (??) |
| 2012 | Glasgow Warriors | 4 | (0) |
| 2013–18 | Oyonnax | 101 | (65) |
- Correct as of 30 December 2019
Provincial / State sides
| Years | Team | Apps | (Points) |
| 2006–09 | North Harbour | 26 | (20) |
Super Rugby
| Years | Team | Apps | (Points) |
| 2010 | Blues | 13 | (0) |
International career
| Years | Team | Apps | (Points) |
| 2011– | Tonga | 28 | (15) |
- Correct as of 9 October 2015

Viliami Ma'afu (born 9 March 1982) is a Tongan rugby union footballer. His usual position is number eight. He was part of the Tongan squad at the 2011 Rugby World Cup where he played in four matches. In Summer 2012, he joined Glasgow Warriors from Japanese side Mitsubishi Sagamihara DynaBoars but left again in September 2012 due to family and personal reasons.
