= Luke Thompson (rugby union) =

Japan international rugby union player

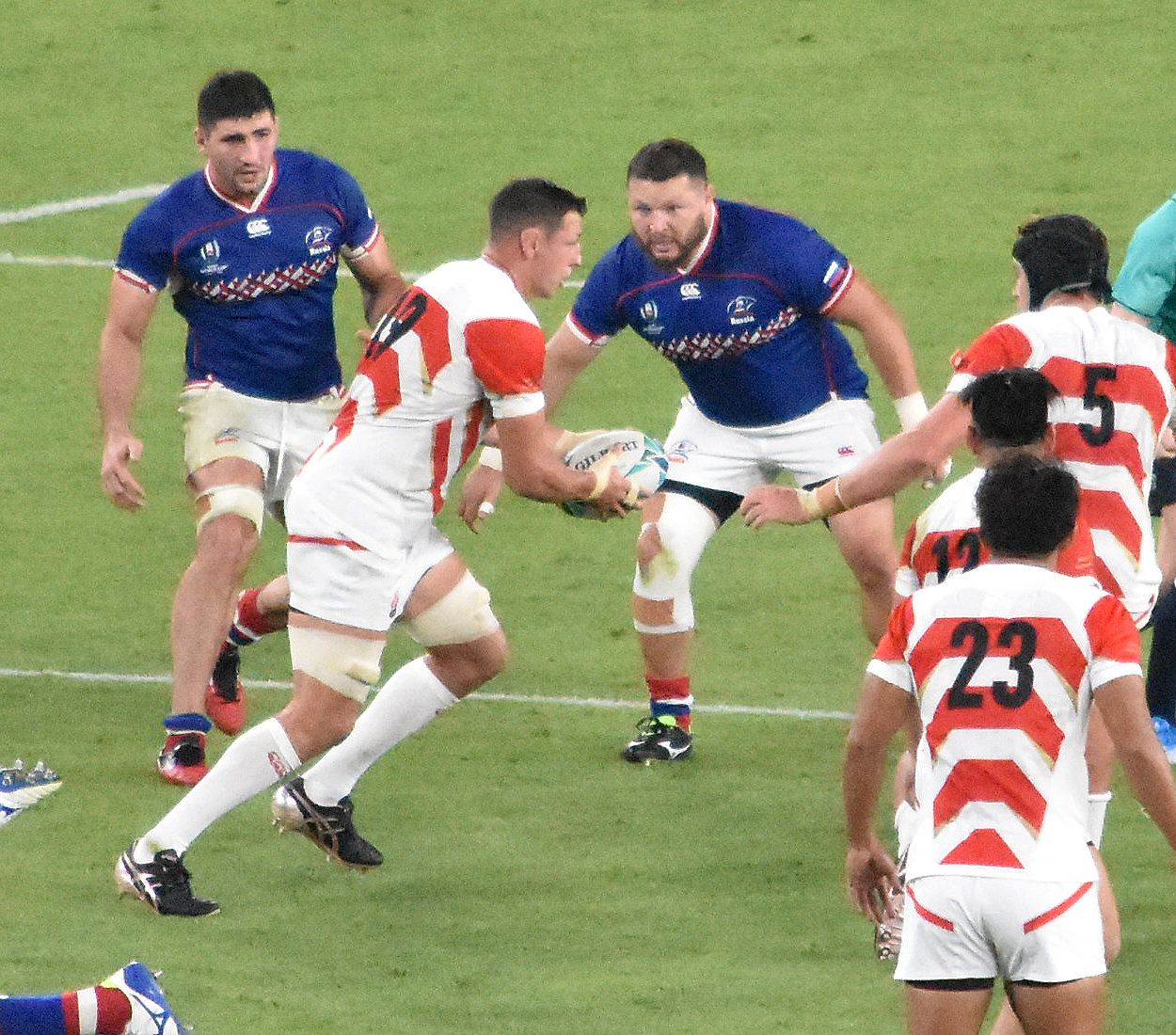
- Born: 16 April 1981 (age 45) Christchurch, New Zealand
- Height: 1.96 m (6 ft 5 in)
- Weight: 108 kg (17 st 0 lb)
- School: St Bede's College
- Notable relative: Anna Thompson (sister)

Rugby union career
- Position(s): Lock, Flanker
Amateur team(s)
Years	Team	Apps	(Points)
- Blackrock College RFC
Senior career
Years	Team	Apps	(Points)
	Canterbury	.	
2004–06	Panasonic Wild Knights	19	(10)
2006–2020	Kintetsu Liners	147	(82)
2021–2023	NTT Communications Shining Arcs	8	(0)
- Correct as of 15 January 2017
International career
Years	Team	Apps	(Points)
2007–2019	Japan	71	(45)
- Correct as of 15 September 2019

Luke Thompson (Japanese: トンプソン ルーク, Hepburn: Tonpuson Rūku; born 16 April 1981) is a retired Japanese rugby union player. He played as a lock and occasional flanker. He was born in Christchurch, New Zealand.

Thompson started his career with Canterbury in New Zealand, but after his route to the team was blocked by the return of Brad Thorn and the presence of Chris Jack, he signed for the Sanyo Wild Knights in 2004. He has since moved to play for the Kintetsu Liners where he played until his retirement.

== International ==
In 2007 he qualified through residency to play for Japan and made his debut in April against Hong Kong. He then became a regular member of the side for all of John Kirwan's reign as Japan coach between 2007 and 2011 representing them at two World Cups. In the 2007 tournament he notably scored 2 tries as Japan pushed Fiji close.

After the 2011 Rugby World Cup, he was left out of the Japan squad for the 2012 Asian 5 Nations by new Japan coach Eddie Jones who had decided to have fewer foreigners in the team than his predecessor Kirwan.

He was recalled briefly in November 2012 where he was called up to the squad as an injury replacement for Toshizumi Kitagawa and started in Japan's first away wins in Europe against Romania and Georgia. In 2013 he was retained in Japan's wider 41 man training squad for the Asian 5 Nations and Pacific Nations Cup, but was cut from the squad when it was trimmed.

Thompson obtained Japanese citizenship in July 2011 after 7 years in Japan, and is well settled. His sister Anna Thompson is a member of the New Zealand national netball team, the Silver Ferns.

During the 2015 Rugby World Cup, Thompson was part of a successful campaign by the Japanese rugby team, where they achieved three wins including against two-time world champions, South Africa. He was also part of the Japanese team in 2019 World Cup, when as hosts they beat Ireland, ranked second in the world at that time, 19–12.[14]
