= Koji Taira =

Japan international rugby union player

- Born: January 12, 1983 (age 43) Nagasaki, Japan
- Height: 6 ft 1 in (1.85 m)
- Weight: 207 lb (94 kg; 14 st 11 lb)

Rugby union career
- Position: Centre
International career
Years	Team	Apps	(Points)
2007-2011	Japan	32	(60)

Koji Taira (平浩二, Taira Kōji) (born 12 January 1983 in Nagasaki, Japan) is a former Japanese rugby union player. Taira played 32 matches for the Japan national rugby union team from 2007 to 2011. Taira played four matches for Japan at the 2007 Rugby World Cup and two matches at the 2011 Rugby World Cup.
