= Chauncey O'Toole =

Canada international rugby union player

- Born: Chauncey O'Toole; 22 February 1986 (age 40) Saint John, New Brunswick
- Height: 185 cm (6 ft 1 in)
- Weight: 105 kg (231 lb)

Rugby union career
- Position: Flanker / No.8
Senior career
Years	Team	Apps	(Points)
2010	Glasgow Warriors	1	(0)
2011–12	Ospreys	5	(0)
2011–12	→ Bridgend Ravens	3	(5)
International career
Years	Team	Apps	(Points)
2009–2012	Canada	21	(15)
National sevens team
Years	Team		Comps
- Canada 7s

Chauncey O'Toole (born 22 February 1986 in Saint John, New Brunswick) is a Canadian former rugby union player. O'Toole played any position across the back-row but his preferred position was at openside flanker. O'Toole made his debut for the Canadian national men's team against Ireland on 23 May 2009.

Chauncey O'Toole was raised in Belleisle, New-Brunswick. He attended Belleisle Regional High School, where he played rugby for the school team.

Chauncey O'Toole has previously played for the Belleisle Rovers, Castaway Wanderers RFC, RGC 1404 in North Wales, and the Rock of the Canadian Rugby Championship. In September 2010, O'Toole signed a short-term contract with the Glasgow Warriors as cover at a time when the club was plagued with injury. He was let go just a month later having played only one game for the Scottish side.

On 8 July 2011, Rugby Canada released its 30-man squad for the 2011 Rugby World Cup which included O'Toole as one of four flankers selected.

O'Toole joined Pro12 side Ospreys after the 2011 Rugby World Cup.

The Ospreys loaned O'Toole to feeder club Bridgend Ravens on 5 November 2011 for their game against Newport RFC. O'Toole scored a try on his debut, in the dying seconds of the game to snatch the win for his adopted side by 2 points.

O'Toole was released by the Ospreys in July 2012.

O'Toole has since joined the ranks of the Saint John Fire Department. (2014)
