= Sione Kalamafoni =

Tongan rugby player (born 1988)

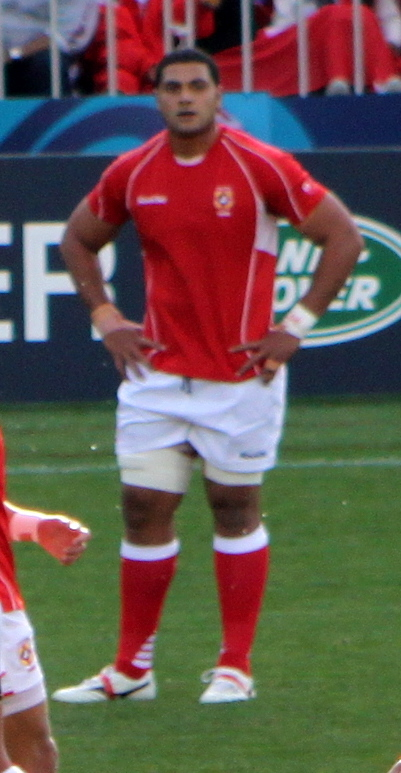
- Born: Sione Maake Kalamafoni; May 18, 1988 (age 38) Matahau, Tonga
- Height: 6 ft 5 in (1.96 m)
- Weight: 121 kg (19 st 1 lb; 267 lb)
- School: Auckland Grammar School

Rugby union career
- Position: Number 8/Flanker
- Current team: Scarlets
Senior career
Years	Team	Apps	(Points)
2010–2012	Nottingham	42	(65)
2012–2017	Gloucester	106	(50)
2017–2020	Leicester Tigers	64	(35)
2020–	Scarlets	52	(45)
- Correct as of 28 September 2022
International career
Years	Team	Apps	(Points)
2007−	Tonga	37	(10)
- Correct as of 1 March 2023

Sione Kalamafoni (born 18 May 1988) is a rugby union footballer who plays at number 8 for Scarlets. Kalamafoni played for Tonga at the 2011 Rugby World Cup, 2015 Rugby World Cup and the 2019 Rugby World Cup.

== Career ==
Kalamafoni first signed to Nottingham in the RFU Championship from the 2010/11 season. On 15 March 2012, Kalamafoni would leave Nottingham to sign for Gloucester Rugby in the Aviva Premiership on a two-year contract from 2012/13 season. On 14 November 2013, Kalamafoni signed a two-year contract extension with Gloucester until the end of 2015/16 season.

On 1 June 2017 Leicester Tigers announced that Kalamafoni would be joining them for the 2017-18 season.

On 26 March 2020, it was confirmed that Kalamafoni would sign for Welsh region Scarlets in the Pro14 ahead of the 2020–21 season.

== Personal life ==
Kalamafoni is a Mormon and undertook a two-year mission in Chicago at the age of 18. In January 2021 he and his family became British citizens.
