= Samiu Vahafolau =

Tonga international rugby union player

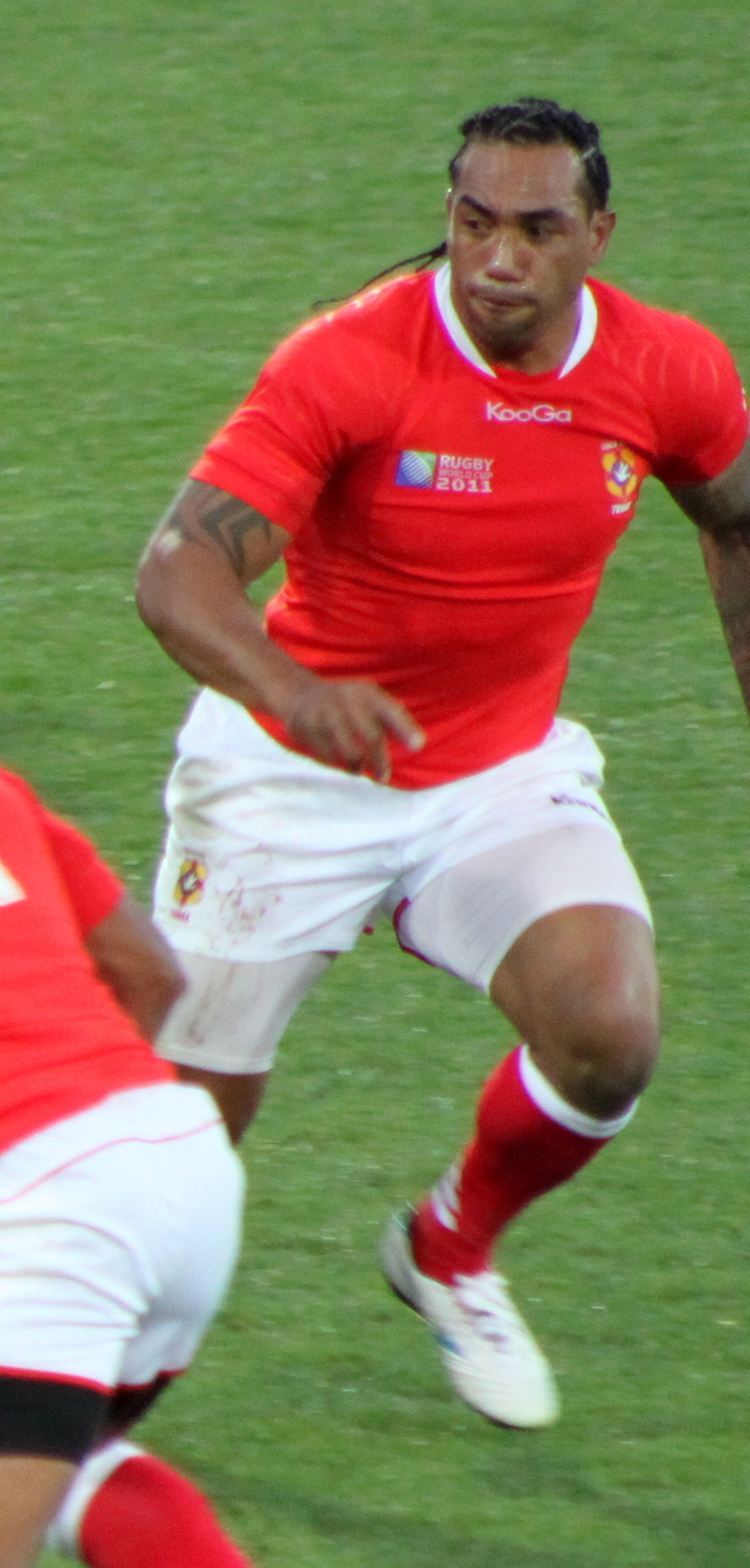
- France vs Tonga at 2011 Rugby World Cup
- Born: Samiu Kaufusi Vahafolau; 24 April 1978 (age 48) Ovaka, Tonga
- Height: 1.92 m (6 ft 4 in)
- Weight: 111 kg (17 st 7 lb)

Rugby union career
- Position: Number 8
Senior career
Years	Team	Apps	(Points)
2005–07	Sanyo Wild Knights		
2007–11	Biarritz	77	(50)
2011–14	Béziers	44	(10)
Provincial / State sides
Years	Team	Apps	(Points)
- Auckland
-	Otago		
Super Rugby
Years	Team	Apps	(Points)
1999	Blues	1	(0)
2000–01	Highlanders	15	(15)
2002	Blues	4	(5)
2003	Highlanders	5	(0)
International career
Years	Team	Apps	(Points)
2007–11	Tonga	14	(10)

Samiu Kaufusi Vahafolau (born 24 April 1978 in Ovaka, Tonga) is a former rugby union footballer who played for AS Béziers in the French Pro D2 as well as the Tongan national team. His usual position was number eight.

== Playing career ==
Vahafolau was born in Tonga and immigrated with his family to New Zealand in 1991. He made his Super 12 debut for the Blues in 1999, but never fully settled in that competition, spending 5 years alternating between stints with the Blues and Highlanders.

After a stint in Japan with the Sanyo Wild Knights, Vahafolau moved to France in 2007 to join Biarritz Olympique in the Top 14. He would find a home at Biarritz and play some of the finest rugby of his career, scoring 6 tries in 24 matches for the squad in his first season. He was the starting number 8 for Biarritz through the 2009-10 season before falling down the pecking order in 2010-11.

After 4 seasons with Biarritz, Vahafolau dropped down a league to sign with AS Béziers of the Pro D2 for 2011-12.

=== International Play ===
Vahafolau made his debut for Tonga in the run-up to the 2007 Rugby World Cup but was not selected to the final squad.

After two years away from the national team, he was brought back in 2011 and scored a try on his return against Fiji on 2 July.
