= Adam Kleeberger =

Canada international rugby union player

- Born: Adam Kleeberger; 2 March 1984 (age 42) Elk Point, Alberta
- Height: 185 cm (6 ft 1 in)
- Weight: 98 kg (216 lb)

Rugby union career
- Position: Flanker / No.8
Senior career
Years	Team	Apps	(Points)
2009–2010	Rotherham	22	(30)
2010	Auckland	2	(0)
2011–2012	London Scottish	12	(0)
International career
Years	Team	Apps	(Points)
2005	Canada U21		
2005-	Canada	35	(20)
National sevens team
Years	Team		Comps
- Canada
Medal record
Men's rugby sevens
Representing Canada
World Games
Bronze medal – third place	2013 Cali	Team competition

Adam Kleeberger (born 2 March 1984) is a Canadian rugby union player. Previously, Kleeberger had played for Canadian clubs University of Victoria and Bayside as well as Rotherham Titans of the RFU Championship. In 2010 he joined Auckland in the ITM Cup. Kleeberger played two matches with Auckland before an injury forced him to return to Canada to join the University of Victoria of the British Columbia Premier League.

Adam made his Canadian national team debut against France in 2005.

On July 8, 2011 it was announced that Kleeberger will represent Canada at the 2011 Rugby World Cup.

In Canada's opening game of the 2011 Rugby World Cup against Tonga, Kleeberger started at blindside flanker and played the full 80 minutes making 24 tackles along the way. Kleeberger was awarded Man of the Match honours for his efforts in the 25-20 victory.

Adam Kleeberger was known for having had an epic beard during the 2011 Rugby World Cup, which was inspired by the substantial growth of fellow Canadian, Andrew Cockell. On October 17, 2011 as part of the Shear the Beard campaign Rick Mercer shaved Kleeberger's beard for two causes; The Christchurch rebuild for New Zealand's hospitality during the tournament and Movember for prostate cancer research.

It was announced on 19 December 2011 that Kleeberger will join London Scottish FC until the end of the 2011-12 RFU Championship season.
