= Yusuke Aoki =

Japanese rugby union player (born 1983)

- Born: Yusuke Aoki; 19 June 1983 (age 43) Tokyo, Japan
- Height: 176 cm (5 ft 9 in)
- Weight: 96 kg (15 st 2 lb)

Rugby union career
- Position: Hooker
Senior career
Years	Team	Apps	(Points)
2006 -	Suntory Sungoliath		
International career
Years	Team	Apps	(Points)
2007 -	Japan	30	

Yusuke Aoki (青木佑輔, Aoki Yūsuke) (born 19 June 1983 in Tokyo, Japan) is a Japanese rugby union player. Aoki has played 28 matches for the Japan national rugby union team. Aoki was a member of the Japan team at the 2011 Rugby World Cup, where he played one match. Aoki currently plays for Top League team Suntory Sungoliath. He started with the club in 2006.
