= Samisoni Fisilau =

- Born: Samisoni Fisilau; 29 November 1987 (age 38) Tofoa, Tonga
- Height: 1.83 m (6 ft 0 in)
- Weight: 106 kg (16 st 10 lb; 234 lb)

Rugby union career
- Position: Scrum-half
Senior career
Years	Team	Apps	(Points)
2015–2017	Jersey Reds	22	(15)
- Correct as of 24 September 2017
Provincial / State sides
Years	Team	Apps	(Points)
2008–11	Counties Manukau	20	(8)
2012	Northland	8	(5)
2013–15	Bay of Plenty	11	(0)
- Correct as of 24 August 2015
Super Rugby
Years	Team	Apps	(Points)
2013	Hurricanes	0	(0)
- Correct as of 25 August 2017
International career
Years	Team	Apps	(Points)
2010–	Tonga	19	(2)
- Correct as of 11 September 2019

Samisoni Fisilau (born 29 November 1987) in Tofoa, Tonga is a Tongan Rugby union player. He plays scrum-half for RFU Championship side Jersey Reds. He previously played for the Super Rugby franchise the Hurricanes. Fisilau played 33 matches for Counties Manukau from 2008 to 2011 before shifting north to Northland in 2012. He currently plays for Bay of Plenty. He has international experience as well with the Tonga national rugby union team.

On 13 January 2015, Fisilau moves to the UK as he signs for Jersey in the RFU Championship from the 2014–15 season.

Fisilau was released by Jersey before the RFU Championship 2017/18 season and is now a free agent.
