= Andrew Maʻilei =

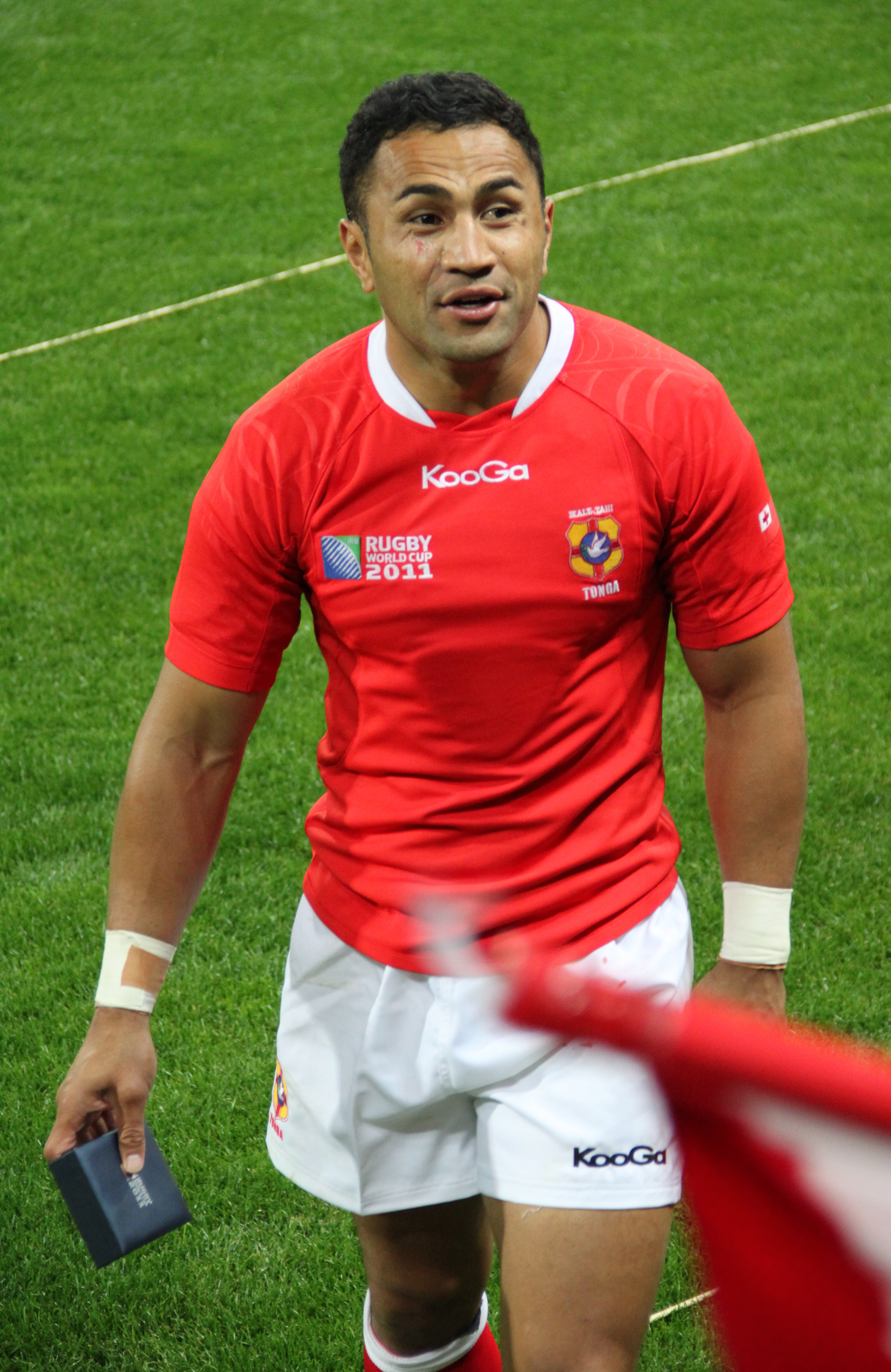
- Ma'ilei in 2011
- Born: 24 May 1980 (age 46) Auckland, New Zealand
- Height: 5 ft 10 in (178 cm)
- Weight: 209 lb (95 kg)

Rugby union career
- Position: Centre
Senior career
Years	Team	Apps	(Points)
2010-	Bordeaux		
International career
Years	Team	Apps	(Points)
2002 – present	Tonga	22	(40)

Andrew Ma'ilei (born 24 May 1980) is a rugby union footballer who plays at centre. Ma'ilei plays for Bordeaux in the Top 14. He also plays for Tonga and competed at the 2011 Rugby World Cup.

== Club ==
- 2004–2005 : North Harbour Rugby Union, New Zealand
- 2005–2006 : Connacht, Ireland
- 2006–2009 : Kintetsu Liners, Japan
- 2009 : North Harbour Rugby Union, New Zealand
- 2010–2013 : Bordeaux Bègles, France
- 2013 : CA Brive, France
