= Vunga Lilo =

Tonga international rugby union player

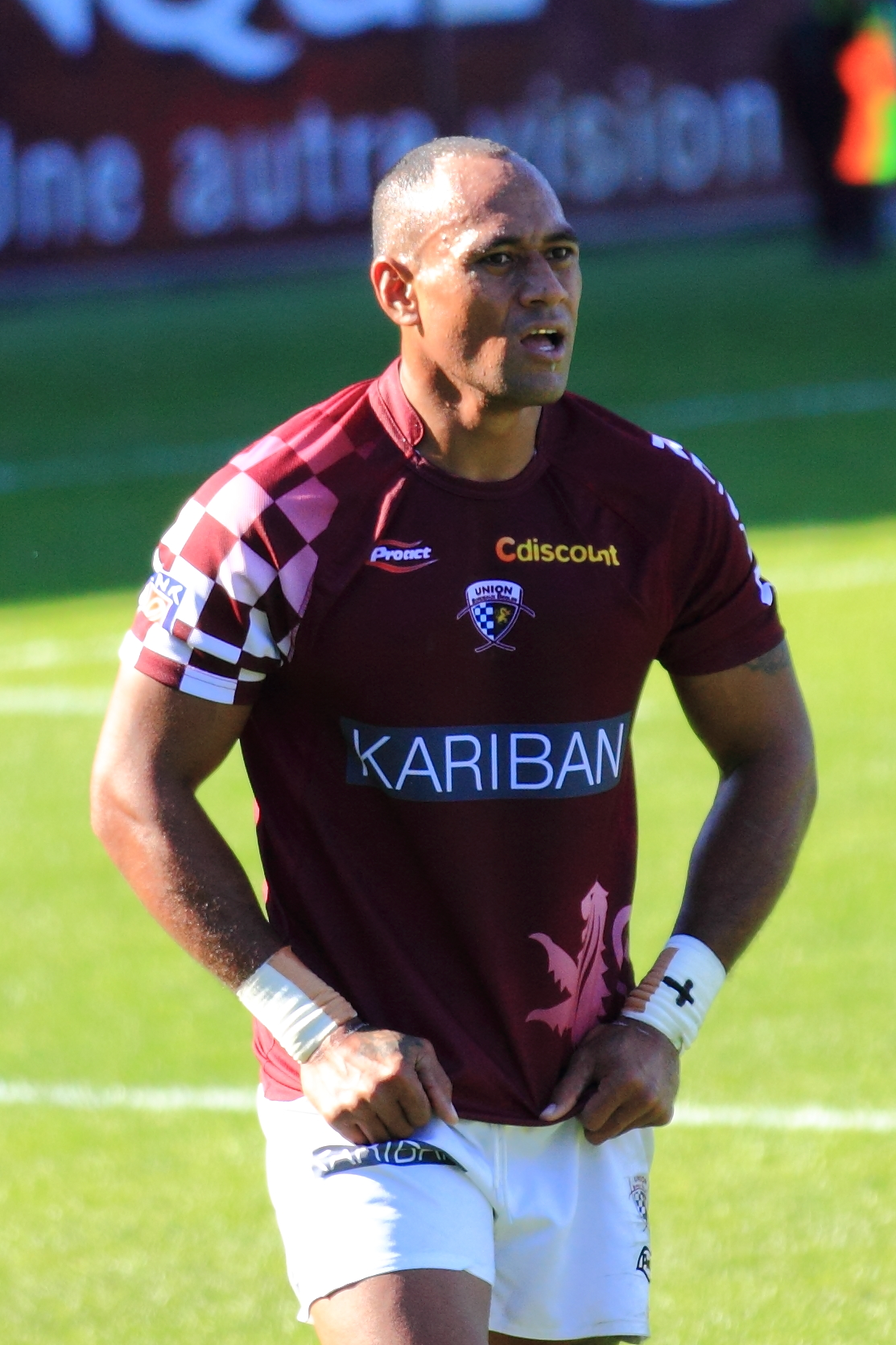
- Born: Vungakoto Filimone Lilo; February 28, 1983 (age 43) Ha'apai, Tonga
- Height: 1.93 m (6 ft 4 in)
- Weight: 17.5 st (245 lb; 111 kg)

Rugby union career
- Position: Fullback
Senior career
Years	Team	Apps	(Points)
2007-2008	Cornish Pirates	13	(35)
2009	Bristol	7	(10)
2010-2012	Bordeaux	64	(115)
2012-15	Tarbes	72	(150)
2015-	Montauban	44	(40)
- Correct as of 24 August 2015
International career
Years	Team	Apps	(Points)
2007−2015	Tonga	42	(87)
- Correct as of 9 October 2015

Vungakoto Filimone Lilo (born 28 February 1983, in Ha'apai, Tonga) is a rugby union footballer who plays for Montauban having previously played for a number of clubs, including Bordeaux and Bristol. He also plays internationally for Tonga and competed at the 2007 Rugby World Cup and the 2011 Rugby World Cup. He plays as a fullback.
