= Itaru Taniguchi =

Japanese rugby union player

- Born: October 1, 1984 (age 42)
- Height: 6 ft 2 in (188 cm)
- Weight: 231 lb (105 kg)

Rugby union career
- Position: Number 8
Senior career
Years	Team	Apps	(Points)
2008–21	Kobelco Steelers	148	(85)
2021–22	Toyota Shuttles		
International career
Years	Team	Apps	(Points)
2010–2011	Japan	10	(0)

Itaru Taniguchi (谷口到, Taniguchi Itaru) (born 1 October 1984 in Ibaraki, Japan) is a Japanese rugby union player. Taniguchi has played ten international matches for the Japan national rugby union team.

Taniguchi was a member of the Japan team at the 2011 Rugby World Cup where he played three matches for the Brave Blossoms.

Taniguchi currently plays for Top League team Kobelco Steelers.
