= Shaun Webb =

Japan international rugby union player

- Born: 30 December 1981 (age 44) Blenheim, New Zealand
- Height: 181 cm (5 ft 11 in)
- Weight: 90 kg (14 st 2 lb; 198 lb)
- School: Christchurch Boys' High School
- University: Lincoln University

Rugby union career
- Position(s): Fly-half, Fullback
Amateur team(s)
Years	Team	Apps	(Points)
- Glenmark
Senior career
Years	Team	Apps	(Points)
2001–2003	Canterbury		
2003	Crusaders		
2004	Otago		
2005–2007	Kobelco Steelers		
2007–2009	World Fighting Bull		
2009–2013	Coca-Cola West Red Sparks		
2013–2016	NEC Green Rockets	21	(174)
International career
Years	Team	Apps	(Points)
2000	New Zealand U19		
2001–2002	New Zealand U21		
2008–2011	Japan	35	(198)
Coaching career
- Years: Team
- Mitsubishi Dynaboars

Shaun James Webb (born 30 December 1981) is a New Zealand-born Japanese rugby union footballer who plays as a fullback. Webb was part of the Japan squad at the 2011 Rugby World Cup. He obtained Japanese citizenship in July 2011, a month before the 2011 Rugby World Cup.
