= Nozomu Fujita =

Japanese rugby union player

- Born: October 2, 1984 (age 42) Saitama Prefecture, Japan
- Height: 6 ft 3 in (1.91 m)
- Weight: 282 lb (128 kg; 20 st 2 lb)

Rugby union career
- Position: Prop
Senior career
Years	Team	Apps	(Points)
- Honda Heat
International career
Years	Team	Apps	(Points)
2010-2011	Japan	14	(0)

Nozomu Fujita (藤田望, Fujita Nozomu) (born 2 October 1984 in Saitama, Japan) is a Japanese rugby union player. Fujita has played 14 matches for the Japan national rugby union team.

Fujita was a member of the Japan team at the 2011 Rugby World Cup, where he played four matches.

Fujita currently plays for Top League team Honda Heat.
