= Tyler Hotson =

Canada international rugby union player

- Born: Tyler Hotson; 30 May 1985 (age 41) Vancouver, British Columbia, Canada
- Height: 196 cm (6 ft 5 in)
- Weight: 115 kg (254 lb)
- University: University of British Columbia

Rugby union career
- Position: Lock
Senior career
Years	Team	Apps	(Points)
2009-2012	Plymouth Albion	55	(5)
2012-2014	London Scottish	25	(10)
2014-	Doncaster Knights		
International career
Years	Team	Apps	(Points)
2008-	Canada	45	(0)

Tyler Hotson (born 30 May 1985, in Vancouver, British Columbia) is a Canadian rugby union player who plays at lock.

Hotson currently plays his rugby with Doncaster Knights in the Aviva Championship. He previously played for the Canadian club UBC Old Boys Ravens and Australian club Northern Suburbs.

He has been part of the Canadian national team since his debut at the 2008 Churchill Cup in a 26-10 victory over the United States. Hotson represented Canada at the 2011 Rugby World Cup.

== Career ==
=== Club ===
???? -???? : UBC Old Boys Ravens ???? -2009 : Northern Suburbs RFC 2009-2012: Plymouth Albion 2012-2014: London Scottish 2014–2016: Doncaster Knights 2016-2017 : Richmond FC

=== National team ===
He earned his first international cap on June 21, 2008 in a match against the United States team in Chicago, Illinois, United States.
