= Takehisa Usuzuki =

Japan international rugby union player

- Born: September 28, 1985 (age 41) Osaka Prefecture, Japan
- Height: 5 ft 11 in (1.80 m)
- Weight: 194 lb (88 kg; 13 st 12 lb)

Rugby union career
- Position: Wing / Fullback
Senior career
Years	Team	Apps	(Points)
2008–22	Toshiba Brave Lupus	118	(240)
- Correct as of 21 February 2021
International career
Years	Team	Apps	(Points)
2011	Japan	7	(40)
National sevens team
Years	Team		Comps
2012–2015	Japan Sevens		11

Takehisa Usuzuki (宇薄岳央, Usuzuki Takehisa) is a Japanese rugby union player. Usuzuki has played seven tests for the Japan national rugby union team. Usuzuki was a member of the Japan national rugby union team at the 2011 Rugby World Cup.
