= Brian Erichsen =

Canadian rugby union player (born 1977)

Brian Erichsen (born 18 August 1977 in Winnipeg, Manitoba, Canada) is a Canadian rugby union coach and former player. He played for the Canada national side and was part of the Canada squad at the 2011 Rugby World Cup. He played as a lock and made his Canada debut in 2009 against Russia and now has five caps in total. He is head coach of the Denver Barbarians RFC XV's sides.

Brian also played for the Manitoba Major Junior Hockey League (MMJHL) in Winnipeg for a few years (1997, 1998). He played defence for the Charleswood Hawks as number 4.
