= Atsushi Hiwasa =

Japanese rugby union player

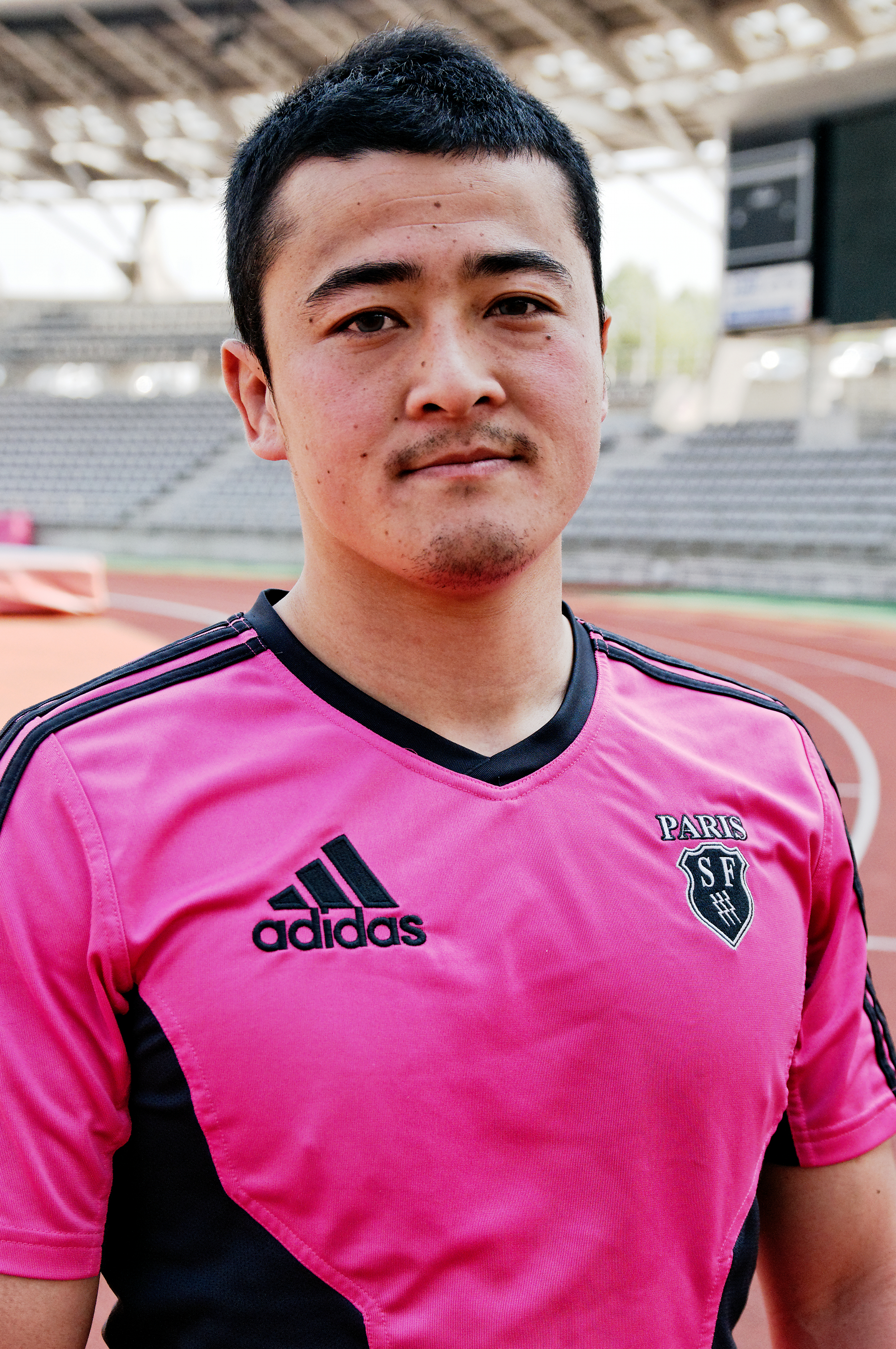
- Atsushi Hiwasa during the Stade Français training session held at Stade Charléty, Paris on 3 April 2012
- Born: May 22, 1987 (age 39) Kobe, Hyōgo, Japan
- Height: 1.66 m (5 ft 5 in)
- Weight: 72 kg (11 st 5 lb)
- School: Hotoku Gakuen High School
- University: Hosei University

Rugby union career
- Position: Scrum-half
Senior career
Years	Team	Apps	(Points)
2010–2018	Suntory Sungoliath	106	(45)
2011–2012	Stade Français	0	(0)
2016	Sunwolves	8	(0)
2018–	Kobelco Steelers	96	(75)
- Correct as of 21 February 2021
International career
Years	Team	Apps	(Points)
2011–2015	Japan	51	(5)
- Correct as of 21 February 2021

Atsushi Hiwasa (日和佐篤, Hiwasa Atsushi) (born 22 May 1987 in Hyogo, Japan) is a Japanese rugby union player. Hiwasa has played 28 international matches for the Japan national rugby union team.

Hiwasa was a member of the Japan team at the 2011 Rugby World Cup, and played four matches for the Brave Blossoms.

Hiwasa currently plays for Top League team Suntory Sungoliath. He commenced playing for the club in 2010.
