= Fabrice Estebanez =

France dual-code international rugby player

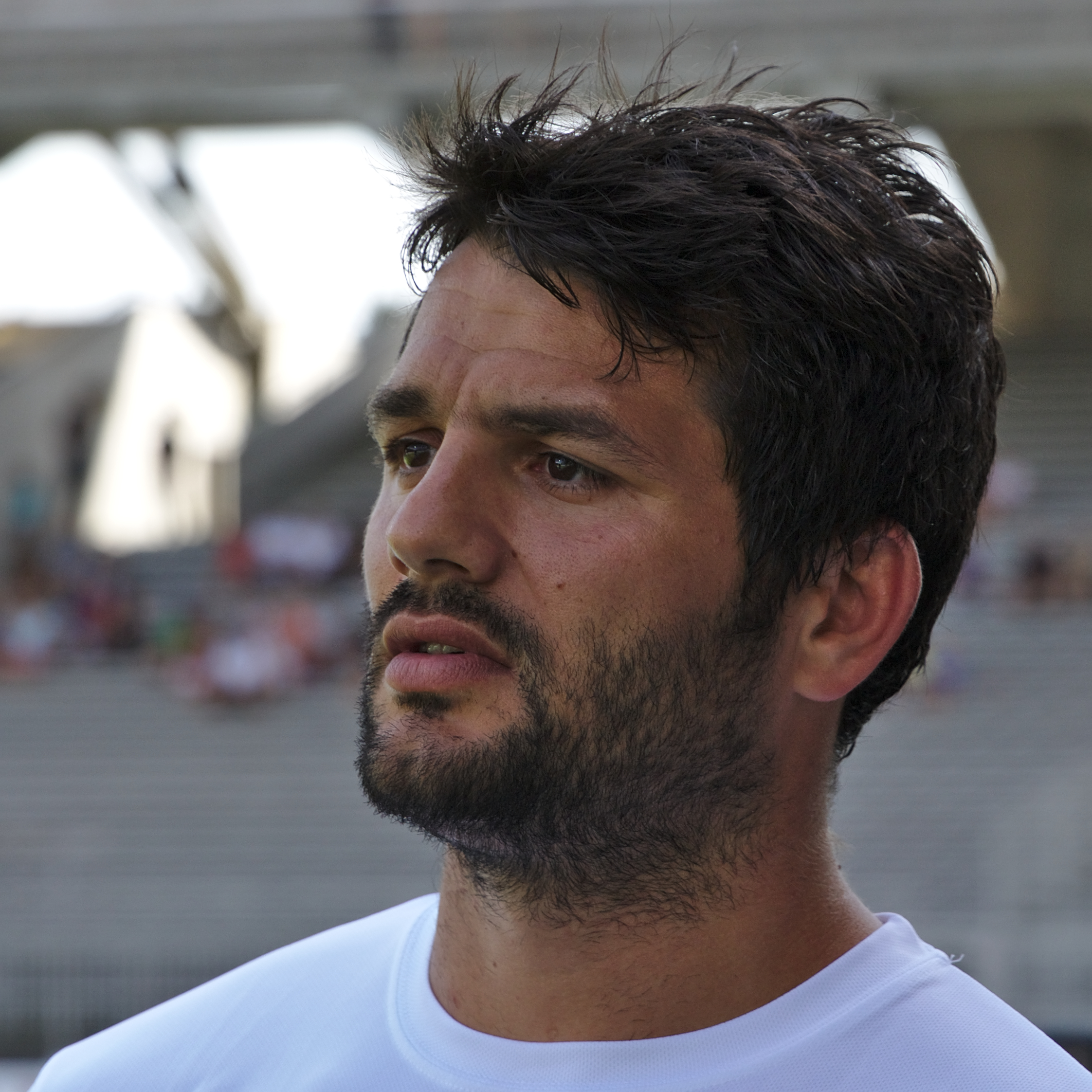

Personal information
- Born: Fabrice Estebanez; 26 December 1981 (age 44) Carcassonne, Aude, Occitania, France
- Height: 1.85 m (6 ft 1 in)
- Weight: 15 st 6 lb (98 kg)

Playing information
- Position: Stand-off
Club
| Years | Team | Pld | T | G | FG | P |
|---|---|---|---|---|---|---|
| 2001–2004 | Limoux Grizzlies |
| 2004–2006 | Toulouse Olympique |
| | Total | 0 | 0 | 0 | 0 | 0 |
Representative
| Years | Team | Pld | T | G | FG | P |
| | France | 25 |

Rugby union career
- Position(s): Centre, Flyhalf
Senior career
| Years | Team | Apps | (Points) |
| 2007–2011 | CA Brive | 74 | (131) |
| 2011– | Racing Métro | | |
International career
| Years | Team | Apps | (Points) |
| 2010– | France | 8 | (0) |
- Correct as of 28 November 2011

Fabrice Estebanez (born 26 December 1981) is a French professional rugby league and rugby union footballer. He has played at club level for CA Brive before joining Racing Metro 92, as a utility back and is able to play as a centre or fly-half.

== Background ==
Fabrice Estebanez was born in Carcassonne, France.

== Career ==
Fabrice Estebanez began playing Rugby League at youth level with Pamiers XIII, then with Limoux XIII. He switched code a first time, playing Rugby Union for U.S. Colomiers as a junior (under 20) player. In 2001, Estebanez switched back to Rugby League, playing for Limoux XIII for three years before joining Toulouse XIII Olympique where, in 2005, he reached the semi-finals of the Challenge Cup. He earned 25 caps for the France national rugby league team; once scoring 10 tries in a 120–0 rout of Serbia on 22 Oct 2003 in the 2003 Mediterranean Cup.

In 2006, he switched to Rugby Union again, joining Rugby Club Gaillac which was just promoted to Pro D2. Since 2007, he plays in the Top 14 for CA Brive, primarily as a fly-half, but often as a centre. On 20 January 2010, he was called by coach Marc Lievremont in the French squad for the 2010 Six Nations Championship. He made his debut for France against Fiji in November 2010.
