= Alisi Tupuailei =

Japan international rugby union player

- Born: Alisi Tupuailei; 1 February 1982 (age 44) Manunu, Samoa
- Height: 187 cm (6 ft 2 in)
- Weight: 116 kg (18 st 4 lb; 256 lb)
- School: Linwood College

Rugby union career
- Position(s): Centre, Wing
Amateur team(s)
Years	Team	Apps	(Points)
- New Brighton
Senior career
Years	Team	Apps	(Points)
2001–2003	Canterbury		
2004–2010	Honda Heat		
2010–2012	Canon Eagles	12	(80)
2013–14	Navy SC		
International career
Years	Team	Apps	(Points)
2001	New Zealand U21		
2009-11	Japan	20	(100)
National sevens team
Years	Team		Comps
2009-12	Japan		8

Alisi Tupuailei (born 1 February 1982) is a former professional rugby union player who played as a centre. Born in Samoa, he played internationally for the Japan national team.

== Career ==
Tupuailei played for Canterbury in the provincial games. He has represented Japan in both sevens and fifteens. He made his Rugby World Cup debut in 2011. He was part of the Japanese squad to the 2012 Hong Kong Sevens.
