= Kensuke Hatakeyama =

Japanese rugby union player

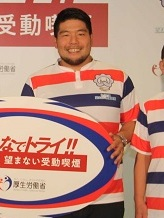
- Born: Kensuke Hatakeyama; August 2, 1985 (age 41) Kesennuma, Miyagi
- Height: 5 ft 10 in (1.78 m)
- Weight: 249 lb (17 st 11 lb; 113 kg)
- School: Sendai Ikuei High School
- University: Waseda University

Rugby union career
- Position: Tighthead Prop
Senior career
Years	Team	Apps	(Points)
2008–2019	Suntory Sungoliath	163	
2016–2016	Newcastle Falcons	7	
2020–2021	New England Free Jacks	3	
2021–2022	Toyota Shuttles		
- Correct as of 23 February 2020
International career
Years	Team	Apps	(Points)
2008−2016	Japan	78	((50))
- Correct as of 23 February 2020

Kensuke Hatakeyama (畠山健介, Hatakeyama Kensuke) (born 2 August 1985 in Miyagi Prefecture, Japan) is a former Japanese rugby union player who played for the New England Free Jacks of Major League Rugby (MLR).

Hatakeyama has played 78 matches for the Japan national rugby union team.

== Professional rugby career ==
Hatakeyama was a member of the Japan team at the 2011 Rugby World Cup; he played four matches and scored one try.

He was also a member of the Japan team that competed in the 2015 Rugby World Cup, including the historic victory over the South Africa Springboks in Brighton.

In July 2017, Hatakeyama was appointed a Representative Director of the Japanese Rugby Football Association.

In 2020, Hatakeyama joined the New England Free Jacks in Major League Rugby, debuting for the Free Jacks in the team's MLR debut.
