= Sione Vaiomoʻunga =

Sione Vaio'mounga
- Born: Sione Vaio'mounga; 8 April 1989 (age 37) Tefisi, Tonga
- Height: 1.80 m (5 ft 11 in)
- Weight: 105 kg (16 st 7 lb)
- School: M.S.C, T.C.T
- Occupation: Junior Coach

Rugby union career
- Position: Flanker
- Current team: CSM Știința Baia Mare
Senior career
Years	Team	Apps	(Points)
2006 - 2011	Toloa Old Boys		
2011 - 2012	Oxford Harlequins	15	(45)
2013 -	CSM Știința Baia Mare		
International career
Years	Team	Apps	(Points)
2009 - Present	Tonga	9	(5)

Sione Vaiomounga (born 8 April 1989) is a Tongan rugby union footballer. He currently plays back-row in which position he represented Tonga at the 2011 Rugby World Cup in New Zealand. Sione made his debut for the national side on 28 November 2009, where he opened his scoring count with a try against Portugal. Sione played for Toloa Old Boys, and he was the only player to be picked in Tonga's 30-man squad for the 2011 World Cup who played in Tonga's domestic division.

In 2011, Sione represented Tonga in the Hong Kong Sevens, where he demonstrated great footwork and powerful running, putting him in a great position building up to the 2011 Rugby World Cup, starting against Canada and Japan in the group stages of the competition - despite Tonga's well deserved 19–14 victory against France they were unsuccessful in qualifying for a quarter-final position

In November 2011, after an impressive World Cup campaign, Sione Vaio'mounga joined National Division 3 side Oxford Harlequins, where he was a major force, and arguably saved the Oxford based club from certain relegation, with his bruising running and physical tackling.
