= Romain Millo-Chluski =

France international rugby union player (born 1983)

Romain Millo Chluski
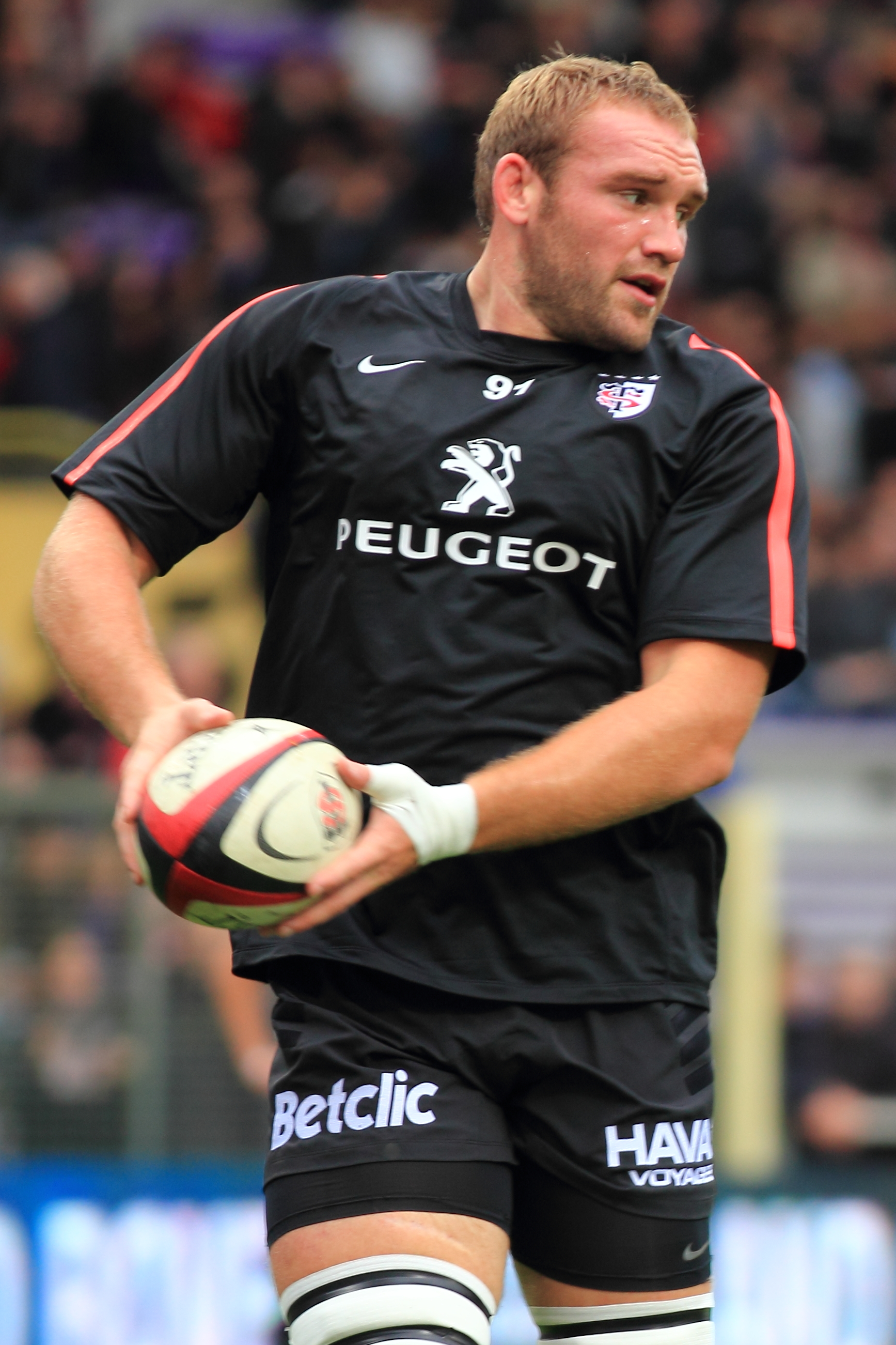
- Born: 20 April 1983 (age 43) Ris Orangis, France
- Height: 1.96 m (6 ft 5 in)
- Weight: 121 kg (19 st 1 lb)

Rugby union career
- Position: Lock
Senior career
Years	Team	Apps	(Points)
2000–2016	Toulouse	301	(20)
2016–2018	Perpignan	30	(0)
- Correct as of 31 January 2015
International career
Years	Team	Apps	(Points)
2005–2011	France	18	(0)

Romain Millo-Chluski (born 20 April 1983 in Ris-Orangis, Essonne) is a former rugby union player for Toulouse in the Top 14 competition. He plays as a lock.

Millo-Chluski won the 2007–08 French Rugby League Championship and both the 2004–05 and 2009–10 Heineken Cup with Toulouse. He won his first cap for France in 2005.
