= Jebb Sinclair =

Canada international rugby union player

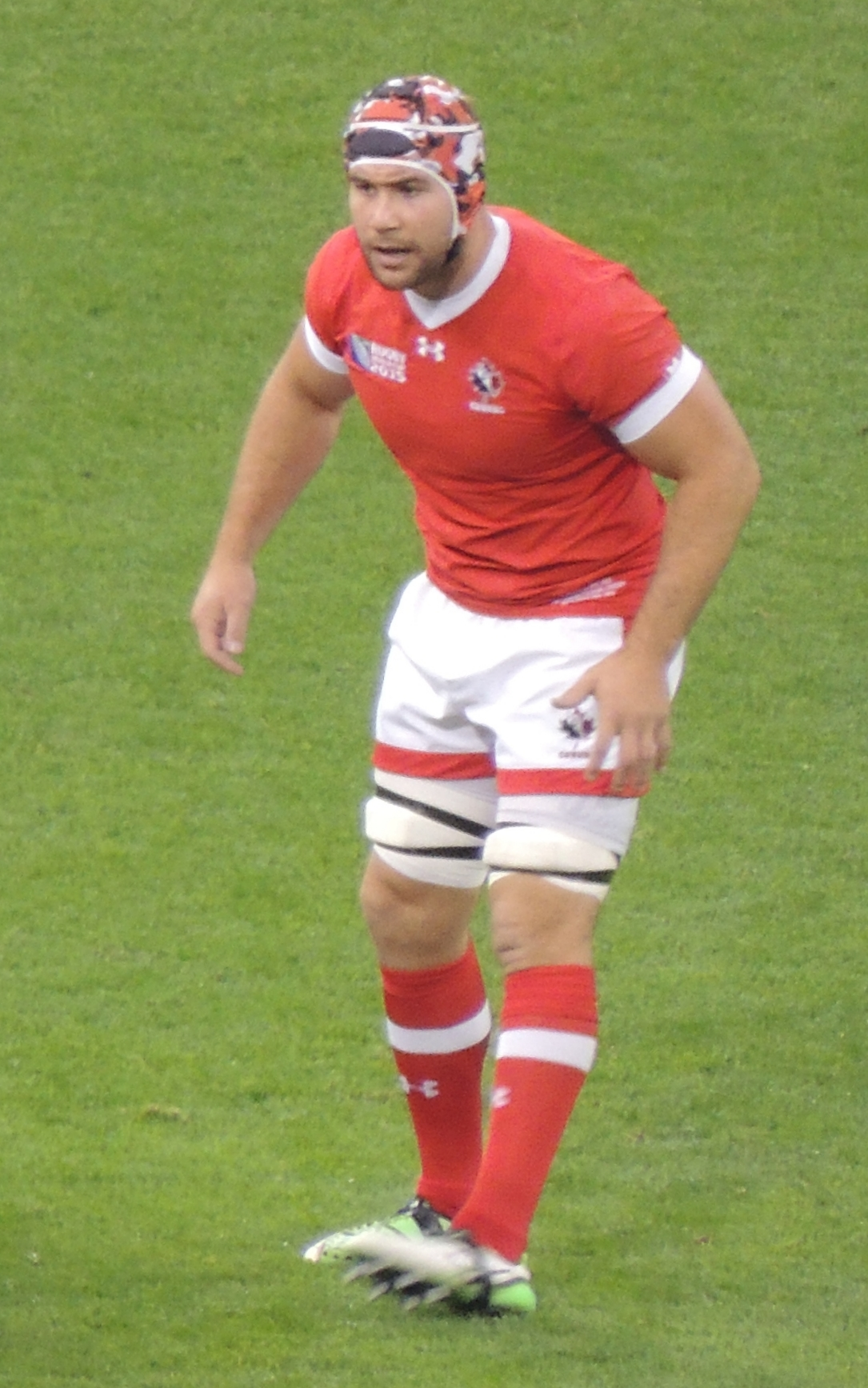
- Born: Jebb Sinclair; 4 August 1986 (age 40) Red Deer, Alberta, Canada
- Height: 193 cm (6 ft 4 in)
- Weight: 111 kg (245 lb)

Rugby union career
- Position: Lock / Flanker / No.8
Senior career
Years	Team	Apps	(Points)
2011-17	London Irish	66	(10)
2012	→ W. Province	12	(5)
- Correct as of 26 August 2015
Super Rugby
Years	Team	Apps	(Points)
2012	→ Stormers	7	(5)
- Correct as of 18 May 2012
International career
Years	Team	Apps	(Points)
2008–15	Canada	42	(10)
- Correct as of 6 October 2015
National sevens team
Years	Team		Comps
2008	Canada		2
- Correct as of 28 January 2015

Jebb Sinclair (born 4 August 1986) is a Canadian rugby union player who played most recently for London Irish. Released from his contract over the summer of 2017, he is now coaching in Canada.

Sinclair is a flanker but can also provide cover in the second row. Jebb made his debut for the Canadian national rugby team against Portugal while on Canada's 2008 tour of Europe.

Sinclair has previously played with the Fredericton Loyalists, Castaway Wanderers RFC, RGC 1404 in North Wales, and The Rock of the Canadian Rugby Championship.

On July 8, 2011 Rugby Canada released its 30-man squad for the 2011 Rugby World Cup which included Sinclair. The 2011 event was Sinclair's first World Cup.

In May 2012, he joined Super Rugby team the Stormers on a short-term loan deal. At the end of the 2012 Super Rugby season, it was announced he would stay on in South Africa to play for Western Province in the 2012 Currie Cup Premier Division.

Sinclair became the second Canadian international to win the Currie Cup following dual South African and Canadian international Christian Stewart. Both Sinclair and Stewart achieved this in the colours of Western Province.
