= Murray Williams =

Japan international rugby union player

- Born: Murray Williams; 27 June 1982 (age 44) Wellington, New Zealand
- Height: 180 cm (5 ft 11 in)
- Weight: 86 kg (13 st 8 lb; 190 lb)
- School: Sacred Heart College
- University: Auckland University

Rugby union career
- Position: Fly-half
Amateur team(s)
Years	Team	Apps	(Points)
- Ponsonby
–	Te Puke		
Senior career
Years	Team	Apps	(Points)
2004–08	Bay of Plenty		
2008–12	Toyota Shokki Shuttles		
2013	Mid Canterbury		
Super Rugby
Years	Team	Apps	(Points)
2007–08	Chiefs	4	(0)
International career
Years	Team	Apps	(Points)
2001	New Zealand U19		
2011	Japan	6	(2)

Murray Williams (born 27 June 1982) is a former New Zealand rugby union player. A fly-half, Williams notably played for Bay of Plenty in the National Provincial Championship and the Chiefs in Super Rugby.

He played for the New Zealand Colts between 2002 and 2003 and has represented Japan at an international level, where he was a member of their 2011 Rugby World Cup squad.

Williams last played for Mid Canterbury in the Heartland Championship during the 2013 season when they defeated North Otago 26–20 to win the Meads Cup.
