= Scott Franklin (rugby union) =

Canada international rugby union player

- Born: Scott Franklin; August 23, 1980 (age 46) Regina, Saskatchewan, Canada
- Height: 1.88 m (6 ft 2 in)
- Weight: 115 kg (18 st 2 lb; 254 lb)

Rugby union career
- Position: Prop
Amateur team(s)
Years	Team	Apps	(Points)
- Castaway Wanderers
Senior career
Years	Team	Apps	(Points)
2007-2008	CA Brive		
2008-2010	Cornish Pirates		
International career
Years	Team	Apps	(Points)
1997-2012	Canada	15	(0)

Scott Franklin (born 23 August 1980 in Regina, Saskatchewan, Canada), is a Canadian Professional rugby union player who plays rugby for the Prairie Wolf Pack in Canada, and for the Canadian national team. Franklin is a prop/Flanker/#8.

== Career ==
Before going into professional rugby, Franklin went to the Athol Murray College of Notre Dame in Saskatchewan where he played football, hockey and rugby. He has represented Canada in U-17, U-19 and U-23. He played club rugby with University of Victoria, Campion Grads, Regina Rogues & Castaway Wanderers RFC in British Columbia, before turning pro and moving to CA Brive in France in 2007. Franklin then spent two seasons with the Cornish Pirates from 2008 to 2010. He has 17 caps for the Canadian national team, the first one against the United States in June 2007. Franklin was part of Canada's squad for the 2007 Rugby World Cup & the 2011 World Cup in New Zealand.

Scott Franklin has recently been selected as part of the "Canada Selects" team that will compete in the 2010 Americas Rugby Championship.

On July 8, 2011, Rugby Canada announced the Canadian 30-man squad for the 2011 Rugby World Cup which included Franklin as one of the five props selected.
