= Taihei Ueda =

Japanese rugby union player (born 1982)

- Born: 3 March 1982 (age 44) Fukuoka, Japan
- Height: 180 cm (5 ft 11 in)
- Weight: 86 kg (13 st 8 lb)

Rugby union career
- Position(s): Fullback, Wing
Senior career
Years	Team	Apps	(Points)
–	Honda Heat		
International career
Years	Team	Apps	(Points)
–	Japan	6	

Taihei Ueda (上田泰平, Ueda Taihei) (born 3 March 1982 in Fukuoka, Japan) is a Japanese rugby union player. Ueda has played six international matches for the Japan national rugby union team.

Ueda was a member of the Japan team at the 2011 Rugby World Cup, playing one match against eventual winners the All Blacks.

As of 2014 Ueda plays for Top League team Honda Heat.
