= Hisateru Hirashima =

Japanese rugby union footballer

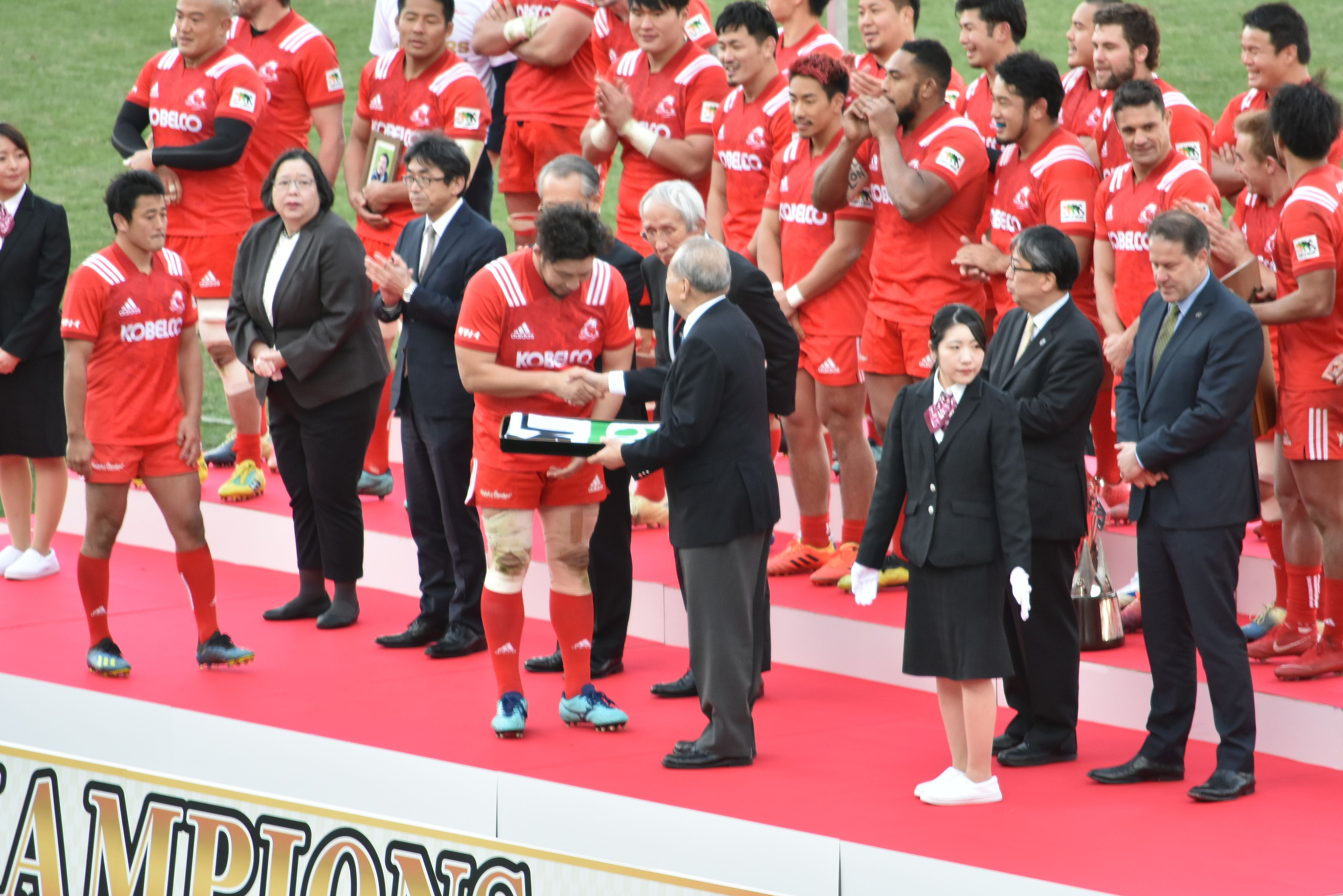
- Born: January 15, 1983 (age 43) Kumamoto, Japan
- Height: 5 ft 11 in (1.80 m)
- Weight: 242 lb (110 kg)

Rugby union career
- Position: Prop
Senior career
Years	Team	Apps	(Points)
2007–2022	Kobelco Steelers	157	(25)
International career
Years	Team	Apps	(Points)
2008–2015	Japan	42	(0)
- Correct as of 21 February 2021

Hisateru Hirashima (平島 久照, Hirashima Hisateru; born 15 January 1983 in Kumamoto, Japan) is a Japanese rugby union footballer. He plays for the Kobe Kobelco Steelers in Japan's Top League, and the Japanese rugby team. He has earned 18 caps for his country.

Hirashima was born in Kumamoto, Southern Japan and graduated from Kumamoto Nishi High School and Fukuoka University. He is currently the captain for the Kobe Steelers, and has made 62 first team appearances as a prop.
