= Ander Monro =

Canada international rugby union player

- Born: 6 September 1981 (age 45) North York, Ontario
- Height: 178 cm (5 ft 10 in)
- Weight: 82 kg (12 st 13 lb)
- University: University of Edinburgh

Rugby union career
- Position: Fly-half
Senior career
Years	Team	Apps	(Points)
2003-2006	Edinburgh	14	(44)
2006-2007	Waterloo	15	(52)
2007-2009	Colorno Rugby		
International career
Years	Team	Apps	(Points)
2006-	Canada	30	(65)

Alexander "Ander" Monro (born September 6, 1981) is a Canadian rugby union footballer. He previously played for the Edinburgh Gunners, Waterloo R.F.C. and Colorno Rugby Club in Italy. He currently plays club rugby for Castaway Wanderers and plays with the Ontario Blues in the Canadian Rugby Championship. He is also a member of the Canadian national rugby team.

Ander was born in North York, Ontario, Canada. He is the grandson of Hector Monro, Baron Monro of Langholm, the former President of the Scottish Rugby Union. He was educated at Glenalmond College where he captained the 1st XV in 2000. Ander then went on to study at the University of Edinburgh.

On July 8, 2011, it was announced that Monro will represent Canada at the 2011 Rugby World Cup.

As of September 18, 2011, Monro has scored 49 points with 28 caps for Canada. These points consist of 2 tries, 6 conversions, 6 penalties and 3 drop goals.
