= Julien Pierre =

French rugby union player (born 1981)

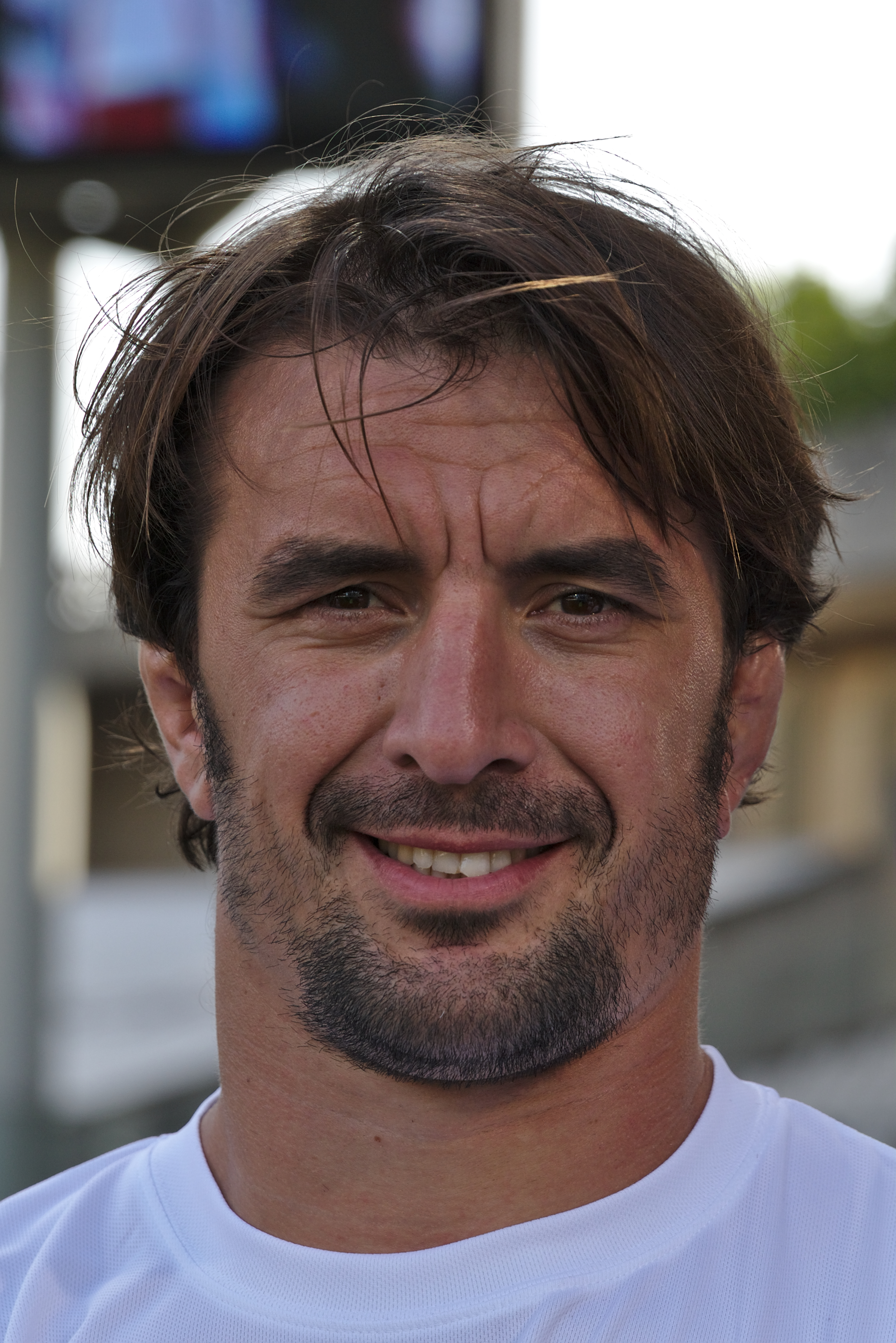
- Born: Julien Pierre; 31 July 1981 (age 45) Rodez, France
- Height: 1.97 m (6 ft 5 1/2 in)
- Weight: 110 kg (243 lb; 17 st 5 lb)

Rugby union career
- Position: Lock
- Current team: Pau
Senior career
Years	Team	Apps	(Points)
2001–2002	La Rochelle	6	(0)
2002–2008	Bourgoin	108	(30)
2008–2015	Clermont	167	(10)
2015-2018	Pau	58	(0)
- Correct as of 31 January 2015
International career
Years	Team	Apps	(Points)
2007–	France	27	(5)

Julien Pierre (born 31 July 1981) is a French rugby union player for Clermont Auvergne in the Top 14. He plays as a lock.

He won his first cap on France's 2007 tour of New Zealand. He previously played for Bourgoin and La Rochelle. He was a replacement in the final as Clermont won the Top 14 title in 2009–10.

He was injured in an attack on him and other teammates in July 2014 after visiting a nightclub in Millau.
