= Toshizumi Kitagawa =

Japanese rugby union player

- Born: February 7, 1981 (age 45) Kyoto, Japan
- Height: 6 ft 5 in (196 cm)
- Weight: 249 lb (113 kg)

Rugby union career
- Position: Lock
Senior career
Years	Team	Apps	(Points)
2004–2019	Toyota Verblitz	162	(15)
2020–	Hino Red Dolphins	6	(0)
International career
Years	Team	Apps	(Points)
2005–2013	Japan	43	(10)

Toshizumi Kitagawa (北川俊澄, Kitagawa Toshizumi) (born 7 February 1981 in Kyoto, Japan) is a Japanese rugby union player. Kitagawa has played 43 international matches for the Japan national rugby union team.

Kitagawa was a member of the Japan team at the 2011 Rugby World Cup, and played four matches for the Brave Blossoms.
