= James Arlidge =

Japan international rugby union player

- Full name: James Anthony Arlidge
- Born: 11 August 1979 (age 47) Hamilton, New Zealand
- Height: 187 cm (6 ft 2 in)
- Weight: 87 kg (192 lb; 13 st 10 lb)
- School: Dilworth School
- University: University of Auckland

Rugby union career
- Position(s): First five-eighth, Fullback
Senior career
Years	Team	Apps	(Points)
2001–2002	Blues	13	(107)
2001–2002	Auckland	7	(32)
2001–2003	Northland	21	(203)
2003	Highlanders	7	(7)
2008–2010	Dragons	38	(250)
2010–2013	Nottingham	67	(753)
- Correct as of 22 June 2019
International career
Years	Team	Apps	(Points)
2002	New Zealand Barbarians	1	(0)
2003	New Zealand Māori	1	(0)
2007–2011	Japan	32	(286)
- Correct as of 22 June 2019

James Arlidge (ジェームス・アレジ, Jēmusu Areji) (born 11 August 1979) is a Japanese international rugby union player. He plays primarily at fly-half.

== Club career ==
Unusually, he made his Super Rugby debut for the Auckland Blues, prior to making his first start in provincial rugby, making the step from junior rugby with Pakuranga and the Auckland Colts, due to the then Blues first choice fly-half Carlos Spencer being injured. Later in 2002 Arlidge would go on to make his debut for Auckland in New Zealand's National Provincial Championship.

In 2001 having started the NPC season with Auckland, Arlidge would spend the majority of the season on loan with another side in the Blues franchise. Northland. After another season back with Auckland and the Blues, Arlidge opted to sign for South Island side the Highlanders (rugby union) for the 2003 Super 12 season, as well as playing his NPC rugby with Otago. His brother Gareth has also represented Auckland at provincial level.

After a single season in Dunedin, Arlidge began a four-year stint in Japan with Osaka based club NTT DoCoMo Kansai. Having been listed by the Japan Rugby Football Union as being unaffiliated to a club, on 5 May 2008 the South Wales Argus quoted new Newport Gwent Dragons signing Tom Willis as "looking forward to joining forces with his compatriots and former Highlanders team-mates, including James Arlidge, in Dragons colours next season.". In June 2010 Nottingham announced that Arlidge had joined them on a one-year contract.

== International ==
Prior to leaving New Zealand, Arlidge made his New Zealand Maori debut, against a Canada All Stars side, on their 2003 North America tour.

Having qualified for Japan on residency grounds, Arlidge was named by new "Cherry Blossoms" coach and fellow New Zealander John Kirwan's first squad. His test debut came in an emphatic 82–0 win over South Korea in Tokyo, scoring two tries and converting all of his ten conversions. Having looked a certainty for a berth in the 2007 Rugby World Cup squad, a fractured leg obtained against a Classic All Blacks side forced Arlidge onto the sidelines, until the 2008 HSBC Asian Five Nations.

In the 2008 IRB Pacific Nations Cup Arlidge was the top points scorer with 56 for Japan, six points ahead of Callum Bruce of the New Zealand Maori.

Arlidge was included in Japan's 2011 Rugby World Cup squad. He played in 3 of Japan's 4 matches during the tournament, scoring 34 points, consisting of 2 tries, 3 conversions and 6 penalties.
