= 2011 Rugby World Cup squads =

The 2011 Rugby World Cup was an international rugby union tournament played in New Zealand from 9 September to 23 October 2011. Each of the 20 competing nations was required to confirm its 30-man squad by 23 August; only players in these squads were eligible to take part in the tournament.

Players could be replaced for medical or compassionate reasons, but they would be unable to return to the squad. Any replacement players had an enforced stand-down period of 48 hours before they could take the field.

Players marked (c) were the nominated captains for their teams. Number of caps and players' ages are indicated as of 9 September 2011, the tournament's opening day.

The tournament was played during the Super Rugby off-season. Players who were released or changed clubs are out-of-contract with their clubs and finished with their 2011 clubs, and in-contract with their national unions and/or future clubs for the 2012 (2011–12 in the Northern Hemisphere) season. Players were listed with their current affiliations as of the opening day of the tournament on 9 September (with some on-going updates during the tournament).

Three squads were made up entirely of players from home-based clubs. Two of these, Australia and New Zealand, had players who signed with overseas clubs for the 2011–12 northern hemisphere season. However, all players on both squads played for clubs within their country, either in Super Rugby or New Zealand's domestic ITM Cup, in the preceding 2011 season. In addition, these players remained under contract with their national unions until the end of the World Cup. The third such squad, France, consists entirely of players under contract with French clubs in both 2010–11 and 2011–12.

== Pool A ==
=== Canada ===
Canada's 30-man squad for the tournament was named on 8 July.

Head coach: (New Zealand) Kieran Crowley

Note: Flags indicate national union for the club/province as defined by World Rugby.

| Player | Position | Date of birth (age) | Caps | Club/province |
|---|---|---|---|---|
| Ryan Hamilton | Hooker | 9 April 1988 (aged 23) | 4 | (Canada) BC Bears |
| Pat Riordan (c) | Hooker | 30 September 1979 (aged 31) | 39 | (Canada) BC Bears |
| Hubert Buydens | Prop | 4 January 1982 (aged 29) | 6 | (Canada) Prairie Wolf Pack |
| Scott Franklin | Prop | 23 August 1980 (aged 31) | 8 | (Canada) Prairie Wolf Pack |
| Jason Marshall | Prop | 5 February 1985 (aged 26) | 8 | (France) Aurillac |
| Andrew Tiedemann | Prop | 21 July 1988 (aged 23) | 10 | (Canada) Prairie Wolf Pack |
| Frank Walsh | Prop | 5 September 1976 (aged 35) | 4 | (Canada) The Rock |
| Jamie Cudmore | Lock | 6 September 1978 (aged 33) | 23 | (France) Clermont Auvergne |
| Brian Erichsen | Lock | 18 August 1977 (aged 34) | 5 | (Canada) BC Bears |
| Tyler Hotson | Lock | 30 May 1985 (aged 26) | 20 | (England) Plymouth Albion |
| Nanyak Dala | Flanker | 18 June 1984 (aged 27) | 11 | (Canada) Prairie Wolf Pack |
| Adam Kleeberger | Flanker | 2 March 1984 (aged 27) | 31 | (England) London Scottish |
| Chauncey O'Toole | Flanker | 22 February 1986 (aged 25) | 13 | (Wales) Ospreys |
| Jebb Sinclair | Flanker | 8 April 1986 (aged 25) | 17 | (England) London Irish |
| Aaron Carpenter | Number 8 | 9 January 1983 (aged 28) | 38 | (England) Plymouth Albion |
| Jeremy Kyne | Number 8 | 2 May 1983 (aged 28) | 1 | (Canada) Prairie Wolf Pack |
| Ed Fairhurst | Scrum-half | 7 May 1979 (aged 32) | 51 | (Canada) BC Bears |
| Jamie Mackenzie | Scrum-half | 28 February 1989 (aged 22) | 3 | (England) Esher |
| Sean White | Scrum-half | 28 June 1988 (aged 23) | 10 | (Canada) BC Bears |
| Nathan Hirayama | Fly-half | 23 March 1988 (aged 23) | 7 | (Canada) BC Bears |
| Ander Monro | Fly-half | 6 September 1981 (aged 30) | 26 | (Canada) Ontario Blues |
| Mike Scholz | Centre | 6 August 1988 (aged 23) | 4 | (Canada) Ontario Blues |
| Ryan Smith | Centre | 13 September 1979 (aged 31) | 47 | (Canada) Prairie Wolf Pack |
| Conor Trainor | Centre | 12 May 1989 (aged 22) | 1 | (Canada) BC Bears |
| D. T. H. van der Merwe | Centre | 28 April 1986 (aged 25) | 17 | (Scotland) Glasgow Warriors |
| Ciaran Hearn | Wing | 30 December 1985 (aged 25) | 17 | (Canada) The Rock |
| Phil Mackenzie | Wing | 25 February 1987 (aged 24) | 9 | (England) Esher |
| Taylor Paris | Wing | 6 October 1992 (aged 18) | 3 | (Canada) Ontario Blues |
| Matt Evans | Fullback | 2 January 1988 (aged 23) | 12 | (England) Cornish Pirates |
| James Pritchard | Fullback | 21 July 1979 (aged 32) | 39 | (England) Bedford Blues |

=== France ===
Marc Lièvremont announced his 31-man France squad for the tournament on 21 August. David Skrela was injured and subsequently replaced by Jean-Marc Doussain.

Head coach: (France) Marc Lièvremont

Note: Flags indicate national union for the club/province as defined by World Rugby.

| Player | Position | Date of birth (age) | Caps | Club/province |
|---|---|---|---|---|
| Guilhem Guirado | Hooker | 17 June 1986 (aged 25) | 14 | (France) Perpignan |
| William Servat | Hooker | 9 February 1978 (aged 33) | 37 | (France) Toulouse |
| Dimitri Szarzewski | Hooker | 26 January 1983 (aged 28) | 50 | (France) Stade Français |
| Fabien Barcella | Prop | 27 October 1983 (aged 27) | 13 | (France) Biarritz |
| Luc Ducalcon | Prop | 2 January 1984 (aged 27) | 7 | (France) Castres |
| Nicolas Mas | Prop | 23 May 1980 (aged 31) | 45 | (France) Perpignan |
| Jean-Baptiste Poux | Prop | 26 September 1979 (aged 31) | 30 | (France) Toulouse |
| Romain Millo-Chluski | Lock | 20 April 1983 (aged 28) | 17 | (France) Toulouse |
| Lionel Nallet | Lock | 14 September 1976 (aged 34) | 64 | (France) Racing Métro |
| Pascal Papé | Lock | 5 October 1980 (aged 30) | 28 | (France) Stade Français |
| Julien Pierre | Lock | 31 July 1981 (aged 30) | 19 | (France) Clermont |
| Julien Bonnaire | Flanker | 20 September 1978 (aged 32) | 63 | (France) Clermont |
| Thierry Dusautoir (c) | Flanker | 18 November 1981 (aged 29) | 43 | (France) Toulouse |
| Imanol Harinordoquy | Flanker | 20 February 1980 (aged 31) | 70 | (France) Biarritz |
| Fulgence Ouedraogo | Flanker | 21 July 1986 (aged 25) | 23 | (France) Montpellier |
| Raphaël Lakafia | Number 8 | 28 October 1988 (aged 22) | 1 | (France) Biarritz |
| Louis Picamoles | Number 8 | 5 February 1986 (aged 25) | 18 | (France) Toulouse |
| Morgan Parra | Scrum-half | 15 November 1988 (aged 22) | 29 | (France) Clermont |
| Dimitri Yachvili | Scrum-half | 19 September 1980 (aged 30) | 52 | (France) Biarritz |
| Jean-Marc Doussain | Fly-half | 12 February 1991 (aged 20) | 0 | (France) Toulouse |
| François Trinh-Duc | Fly-half | 11 November 1986 (aged 24) | 29 | (France) Montpellier |
| David Skrela | Fly-half | 2 March 1979 (aged 32) | 22 | (France) Clermont |
| Fabrice Estebanez | Centre | 26 December 1981 (aged 29) | 5 | (France) Racing Métro |
| David Marty | Centre | 30 October 1982 (aged 28) | 34 | (France) Perpignan |
| Maxime Mermoz | Centre | 28 July 1986 (aged 25) | 9 | (France) Perpignan |
| Aurélien Rougerie | Centre | 26 September 1980 (aged 30) | 64 | (France) Clermont |
| Vincent Clerc | Wing | 7 May 1981 (aged 30) | 50 | (France) Toulouse |
| Maxime Médard | Wing | 16 November 1986 (aged 24) | 21 | (France) Toulouse |
| Alexis Palisson | Wing | 9 September 1987 (aged 24) | 16 | (France) Toulon |
| Cédric Heymans | Fullback | 20 July 1978 (aged 33) | 55 | (France) Bayonne |
| Damien Traille | Fullback | 12 June 1979 (aged 32) | 83 | (France) Biarritz |

=== Japan ===
Japan's 30-man squad for the tournament was named on 22 August. Justin Ives and Ryukoliniasi Holani were ruled out with injury, they were replaced by Yuji Kitagawa and Toetsu Taufa. Tomoki Yoshida and Yuta Imamura were ruled out with injury, they were replaced by Ippei Asada and Bryce Robins.

Head coach: (New Zealand) John Kirwan

Note: Flags indicate national union for the club/province as defined by World Rugby.

| Player | Position | Date of birth (age) | Caps | Club/province |
|---|---|---|---|---|
| Yusuke Aoki | Hooker | 28 February 1983 (aged 28) | 21 | (Japan) Suntory Sungoliath |
| Shota Horie | Hooker | 21 January 1986 (aged 25) | 14 | (Japan) Panasonic Wild Knights |
| Hiroki Yuhara | Hooker | 21 January 1984 (aged 27) | 8 | (Japan) Toshiba Brave Lupus |
| Nozomu Fujita | Prop | 2 October 1984 (aged 26) | 10 | (Japan) Honda Heat |
| Kensuke Hatakeyama | Prop | 2 August 1985 (aged 26) | 23 | (Japan) Suntory Sungoliath |
| Hisateru Hirashima | Prop | 15 January 1983 (aged 28) | 24 | (Japan) Kobelco Steelers |
| Naoki Kawamata | Prop | 31 October 1985 (aged 25) | 17 | (Japan) Panasonic Wild Knights |
| Toshizumi Kitagawa | Lock | 7 February 1981 (aged 30) | 37 | (Japan) Toyota Verblitz |
| Yuji Kitagawa | Lock | 11 August 1986 (aged 25) | 5 | (Japan) Panasonic Wild Knights |
| Hitoshi Ono | Lock | 6 May 1978 (aged 33) | 51 | (Japan) Toshiba Brave Lupus |
| Luke Thompson | Lock | 16 April 1981 (aged 30) | 34 | (Japan) Kintetsu Liners |
| Takashi Kikutani (c) | Flanker | 24 February 1980 (aged 31) | 44 | (Japan) Toyota Verblitz |
| Michael Leitch | Flanker | 7 October 1988 (aged 22) | 19 | (Japan) Toshiba Brave Lupus |
| Sione Vatuvei | Flanker | 14 March 1983 (aged 28) | 5 | (Japan) Panasonic Wild Knights |
| Itaru Taniguchi | Number 8 | 1 October 1984 (aged 26) | 7 | (Japan) Kobelco Steelers |
| Toetu'u Taufa | Number 8 | 8 October 1980 (aged 30) | 21 | (Japan) Kintetsu Liners |
| Ippei Asada | Scrum-half | 26 June 1980 (aged 31) | 0 | (Japan) Toyota Verblitz |
| Atsushi Hiwasa | Scrum-half | 22 May 1987 (aged 24) | 6 | (Japan) Suntory Sungoliath |
| Fumiaki Tanaka | Scrum-half | 3 January 1985 (aged 26) | 28 | (Japan) Panasonic Wild Knights |
| James Arlidge | Fly-half | 11 August 1979 (aged 32) | 29 | (England) Nottingham |
| Murray Williams | Fly-half | 27 June 1982 (aged 29) | 3 | (Japan) Toyota Shokki |
| Ryan Nicholas | Centre | 23 May 1979 (aged 32) | 32 | (Japan) Suntory Sungoliath |
| Bryce Robins | Centre | 19 September 1980 (aged 30) | 24 | (Japan) Honda Heat |
| Koji Taira | Centre | 12 January 1983 (aged 28) | 30 | (Japan) Suntory Sungoliath |
| Alisi Tupuailei | Centre | 28 September 1980 (aged 30) | 16 | (Japan) Canon Eagles |
| Kosuke Endo | Wing | 11 November 1980 (aged 30) | 38 | (Japan) Toyota Verblitz |
| Hirotoki Onozawa | Wing | 29 March 1978 (aged 33) | 64 | (Japan) Suntory Sungoliath |
| Takehisa Usuzuki | Wing | 28 September 1985 (aged 25) | 6 | (Japan) Toshiba Brave Lupus |
| Taihei Ueda | Fullback | 3 March 1982 (aged 29) | 5 | (Japan) Honda Heat |
| Shaun Webb | Fullback | 30 December 1981 (aged 29) | 31 | (Japan) Coca-Cola West |

=== New Zealand ===
New Zealand's 30-man squad for the 2011 Rugby World Cup was announced on 23 August.

On 1 October, Dan Carter sustained a tournament-ending groin injury and was replaced in the squad by Aaron Cruden.

On 9 October, Mils Muliaina sustained a shoulder fracture and Colin Slade suffered a groin tear. Stephen Donald and Hosea Gear were called into the squad to replace them.

Squad and caps are current as of 10 October 2011.

Head coach: (New Zealand) Graham Henry

| Player | Position | Date of birth (age) | Caps | Franchise/province |
|---|---|---|---|---|
| Corey Flynn | Hooker | 5 January 1981 (aged 30) | 15 | (New Zealand) Crusaders |
| Andrew Hore | Hooker | 13 September 1978 (aged 32) | 60 | (New Zealand) Hurricanes |
| Keven Mealamu | Hooker | 20 March 1979 (aged 32) | 90 | (New Zealand) Blues |
| John Afoa | Prop | 10 September 1983 (aged 27) | 36 | (New Zealand) Blues |
| Ben Franks | Prop | 27 March 1984 (aged 27) | 14 | (New Zealand) Crusaders |
| Owen Franks | Prop | 23 December 1987 (aged 23) | 29 | (New Zealand) Crusaders |
| Tony Woodcock | Prop | 27 January 1981 (aged 30) | 81 | (New Zealand) Blues |
| Anthony Boric | Lock | 27 December 1983 (aged 27) | 23 | (New Zealand) Blues |
| Brad Thorn | Lock | 3 February 1975 (aged 36) | 57 | (New Zealand) Crusaders |
| Sam Whitelock | Lock | 12 October 1988 (aged 22) | 23 | (New Zealand) Crusaders |
| Ali Williams | Lock | 30 April 1981 (aged 30) | 71 | (New Zealand) Blues |
| Jerome Kaino | Flanker | 6 April 1983 (aged 28) | 46 | (New Zealand) Blues |
| Richie McCaw (c) | Flanker | 31 December 1980 (aged 30) | 101 | (New Zealand) Crusaders |
| Adam Thomson | Flanker | 13 March 1982 (aged 29) | 24 | (New Zealand) Highlanders |
| Kieran Read | Number 8 | 26 October 1985 (aged 25) | 34 | (New Zealand) Crusaders |
| Victor Vito | Number 8 | 27 March 1987 (aged 24) | 12 | (New Zealand) Hurricanes |
| Jimmy Cowan | Scrum-half | 6 March 1982 (aged 29) | 51 | (New Zealand) Highlanders |
| Andy Ellis | Scrum-half | 21 February 1984 (aged 27) | 24 | (New Zealand) Crusaders |
| Piri Weepu | Scrum-half | 7 September 1983 (aged 28) | 54 | (New Zealand) Hurricanes |
| Aaron Cruden | Fly-half | 8 January 1989 (aged 22) | 7 | (New Zealand) Hurricanes |
| Stephen Donald | Fly-half | 3 December 1983 (aged 27) | 22 | (New Zealand) Chiefs |
| Richard Kahui | Centre | 9 June 1985 (aged 26) | 15 | (New Zealand) Chiefs |
| Ma'a Nonu | Centre | 21 May 1982 (aged 29) | 64 | (New Zealand) Hurricanes |
| Conrad Smith | Centre | 12 October 1981 (aged 29) | 53 | (New Zealand) Hurricanes |
| Sonny Bill Williams | Centre | 3 April 1985 (aged 26) | 12 | (New Zealand) Crusaders |
| Hosea Gear | Wing | 16 March 1984 (aged 27) | 8 | (New Zealand) Hurricanes |
| Zac Guildford | Wing | 8 February 1989 (aged 22) | 8 | (New Zealand) Crusaders |
| Cory Jane | Wing | 2 February 1983 (aged 28) | 30 | (New Zealand) Hurricanes |
| Israel Dagg | Fullback | 6 June 1988 (aged 23) | 10 | (New Zealand) Crusaders |
| Isaia Toeava | Fullback | 15 January 1986 (aged 25) | 36 | (New Zealand) Blues |
| Mils Muliaina | Fullback | 31 July 1980 (aged 31) | 100 | (New Zealand) Blues |

=== Tonga ===
Tonga's 30-man RWC squad was announced on 23 August. Chairman Bob Tuckey allegedly resigned over the proposed selection of former captain Nili Latu.

Head coach: (New Zealand) Isitolo Maka

Note: Flags indicate national union for the club/province as defined by World Rugby.

| Player | Position | Date of birth (age) | Caps | Club/province |
|---|---|---|---|---|
| Aleki Lutui | Hooker | 1 July 1978 (aged 33) | 30 | (England) Worcester Warriors |
| Ilaisa Maʻasi | Hooker | 5 February 1982 (aged 29) | 7 | (New Zealand) Counties Manukau |
| Ephraim Taukafa | Hooker | 26 June 1976 (aged 35) | 30 | (France) Mont-de-Marsan |
| Halani Aulika | Prop | 31 August 1983 (aged 28) | 2 | (New Zealand) Highlanders |
| Taufaʻao Filise | Prop | 26 May 1977 (aged 34) | 15 | (Wales) Cardiff Blues |
| Kisi Pulu | Prop | 31 January 1978 (aged 33) | 23 | (France) Perpignan |
| Sona Taumalolo | Prop | 13 November 1981 (aged 29) | 4 | (New Zealand) Chiefs |
| Soane Tongaʻuiha | Prop | 21 January 1982 (aged 29) | 8 | (England) Northampton Saints |
| Paino Hehea | Lock | 1 February 1979 (aged 32) | 16 | (Italy) Calvisano |
| Tukulua Lokotui | Lock | 31 December 1979 (aged 31) | 5 | (Japan) Kintetsu Liners |
| Sione Timani | Lock | 3 September 1984 (aged 27) | 4 | (Wales) Scarlets |
| Joe Tuineau | Lock | 18 August 1981 (aged 30) | 4 | (France) Montpellier |
| Sione Kalamafoni | Flanker | 18 May 1988 (aged 23) | 14 | (England) Nottingham |
| Finau Maka (c) | Flanker | 10 July 1977 (aged 34) | 5 | (France) Pamiers |
| Sione Vaiomoʻunga | Flanker | 8 April 1989 (aged 22) | 7 | (Tonga) Toloa Old Boys |
| Viliami Maʻafu | Number 8 | 9 March 1982 (aged 29) | 5 | (Japan) Mitsubishi Sagamihara DynaBoars |
| Samiu Vahafolau | Number 8 | 24 April 1978 (aged 33) | 10 | (France) Béziers |
| Samisoni Fisilau | Scrum-half | 29 November 1987 (aged 23) | 7 | (New Zealand) Counties Manukau |
| Taniela Moa | Scrum-half | 11 March 1985 (aged 26) | 2 | (France) Pau |
| Tomasi Palu | Scrum-half | 23 September 1986 (aged 24) | 3 | (New Zealand) Norths |
| Kurt Morath | Fly-half | 13 November 1984 (aged 26) | 9 | (Australia) Souths |
| Alipate Fatafehi | Centre | 13 December 1984 (aged 26) | 7 | (France) Lyon |
| Suka Hufanga | Centre | 18 June 1982 (aged 29) | 22 | (England) Newcastle Falcons |
| Andrew Maʻilei | Centre | 24 May 1980 (aged 31) | 18 | (France) Bordeaux |
| Siale Piutau | Centre | 13 October 1985 (aged 25) | 2 | (New Zealand) Highlanders |
| William Helu | Wing | 19 April 1986 (aged 25) | 7 | (England) Bristol |
| Alaska Taufa | Wing | 24 July 1983 (aged 28) | 5 | (Japan) Akita |
| Fetuʻu Vainikolo | Wing | 30 January 1985 (aged 26) | 2 | (Ireland) Connacht |
| Viliame Iongi | Fullback | 8 August 1989 (aged 22) | 6 | (Wales) Scarlets |
| Vunga Lilo | Fullback | 28 February 1983 (aged 28) | 21 | (France) Bordeaux |

== Pool B ==
=== Argentina ===
Argentina named their squad for the tournament on 10 August 2011. Alvaro Galindo was ruled out with injury and replaced by Genaro Fessia. Gonzalo Tiesi was injured during the England game, he was replaced by Lucas Borges.

Head coach: (Argentina) Santiago Phelan

Note: Flags indicate national union for the club/province as defined by World Rugby.

| Player | Position | Date of birth (age) | Caps | Club/province |
|---|---|---|---|---|
| Agustín Creevy | Hooker | 15 March 1985 (aged 26) | 11 | (France) Montpellier |
| Mario Ledesma | Hooker | 17 May 1973 (aged 38) | 78 | (France) Clermont |
| Marcos Ayerza | Prop | 12 January 1983 (aged 28) | 32 | (England) Leicester Tigers |
| Maximiliano Bustos | Prop | 2 April 1986 (aged 25) | 0 | (France) Montpellier |
| Juan Figallo | Prop | 25 March 1988 (aged 23) | 4 | (France) Montpellier |
| Rodrigo Roncero | Prop | 16 February 1977 (aged 34) | 44 | (France) Stade Français |
| Martín Scelzo | Prop | 5 June 1976 (aged 35) | 54 | (France) Agen |
| Patricio Albacete | Lock | 9 February 1981 (aged 30) | 41 | (France) Toulouse |
| Manuel Carizza | Lock | 23 August 1984 (aged 27) | 19 | (France) Biarritz |
| Mariano Galarza | Lock | 12 November 1986 (aged 24) | 6 | Unattached |
| Tomás Vallejos | Lock | 16 October 1984 (aged 26) | 0 | (England) Harlequins |
| Alejandro Campos | Flanker | 21 April 1983 (aged 28) | 12 | (France) Agen |
| Julio Farías Cabello | Flanker | 19 September 1978 (aged 32) | 3 | (Argentina) Tucumán |
| Genaro Fessia | Flanker | 22 July 1981 (aged 30) | 9 | (England) London Wasps |
| Juan Manuel Leguizamón | Flanker | 6 June 1983 (aged 28) | 34 | (France) Lyon |
| Juan Martín Fernández Lobbe | Number 8 | 19 November 1981 (aged 29) | 40 | (France) Toulon |
| Leonardo Senatore | Number 8 | 13 May 1984 (aged 27) | 2 | (Argentina) GER |
| Alfredo Lalanne | Scrum-half | 3 March 1983 (aged 28) | 7 | Unattached |
| Nicolás Vergallo | Scrum-half | 20 April 1983 (aged 28) | 19 | (France) Toulouse |
| Santiago Fernández | Fly-half | 28 November 1985 (aged 25) | 13 | (France) Montpellier |
| Nicolás Sánchez | Fly-half | 26 October 1988 (aged 22) | 2 | (France) Bordeaux |
| Marcelo Bosch | Centre | 7 January 1984 (aged 27) | 5 | (France) Biarritz |
| Felipe Contepomi (c) | Centre | 20 August 1977 (aged 34) | 71 | (France) Stade Français |
| Agustin Gosio | Centre | 17 March 1983 (aged 28) | 0 | (Argentina) Newman |
| Horacio Agulla | Wing | 22 October 1984 (aged 26) | 29 | (England) Leicester Tigers |
| Lucas Borges | Wing | 17 February 1980 (aged 31) | 33 | (Argentina) Pucará |
| Gonzalo Camacho | Wing | 28 August 1984 (aged 27) | 7 | (England) Exeter Chiefs |
| Juan Imhoff | Wing | 11 May 1988 (aged 23) | 4 | (Argentina) Duendes |
| Lucas González Amorosino | Fullback | 11 February 1985 (aged 26) | 10 | (France) Montpellier |
| Martín Rodríguez | Fullback | 6 March 1985 (aged 26) | 10 | (France) Stade Français |

=== England ===
Martin Johnson announced England's 30-man squad on 22 August. Andrew Sheridan was ruled out due to injury and was replaced by Thomas Waldrom on 25 September.

Team manager: (England) Martin Johnson

Note: Flags indicate national union for the club/province as defined by World Rugby.

| Player | Position | Date of birth (age) | Caps | Club/province |
|---|---|---|---|---|
| Dylan Hartley | Hooker | 24 March 1986 (aged 25) | 29 | (England) Northampton Saints |
| Lee Mears | Hooker | 5 March 1979 (aged 32) | 37 | (England) Bath |
| Steve Thompson | Hooker | 15 July 1978 (aged 33) | 67 | (England) London Wasps |
| Dan Cole | Prop | 9 May 1987 (aged 24) | 17 | (England) Leicester Tigers |
| Alex Corbisiero | Prop | 30 August 1988 (aged 23) | 6 | (England) London Irish |
| Matt Stevens | Prop | 1 October 1982 (aged 28) | 34 | (England) Saracens |
| Dave Wilson | Prop | 9 April 1985 (aged 26) | 18 | (England) Bath |
| Louis Deacon | Lock | 7 October 1980 (aged 30) | 24 | (England) Leicester Tigers |
| Courtney Lawes | Lock | 23 February 1989 (aged 22) | 9 | (England) Northampton Saints |
| Tom Palmer | Lock | 27 March 1979 (aged 32) | 27 | (France) Stade Français |
| Simon Shaw | Lock | 1 September 1973 (aged 38) | 67 | (France) Toulon |
| Tom Croft | Flanker | 7 November 1985 (aged 25) | 25 | (England) Leicester Tigers |
| James Haskell | Flanker | 2 April 1985 (aged 26) | 36 | (Japan) Ricoh Black Rams |
| Lewis Moody (c) | Flanker | 12 June 1978 (aged 33) | 67 | (England) Bath |
| Tom Wood | Flanker | 3 November 1986 (aged 24) | 7 | (England) Northampton Saints |
| Nick Easter | Number 8 | 15 August 1978 (aged 33) | 44 | (England) Harlequins |
| Thomas Waldrom | Number 8 | 28 April 1983 (aged 28) | 0 | (England) Leicester Tigers |
| Joe Simpson | Scrum-half | 5 July 1988 (aged 23) | 0 | (England) London Wasps |
| Richard Wigglesworth | Scrum-half | 9 June 1983 (aged 28) | 7 | (England) Saracens |
| Ben Youngs | Scrum-half | 5 September 1989 (aged 22) | 12 | (England) Leicester Tigers |
| Toby Flood | Fly-half | 8 August 1985 (aged 26) | 41 | (England) Leicester Tigers |
| Jonny Wilkinson | Fly-half | 25 May 1979 (aged 32) | 86 | (France) Toulon |
| Shontayne Hape | Centre | 30 January 1981 (aged 30) | 12 | (England) London Irish |
| Mike Tindall | Centre | 18 October 1978 (aged 32) | 71 | (England) Gloucester |
| Manu Tuilagi | Centre | 18 May 1991 (aged 20) | 1 | (England) Leicester Tigers |
| Delon Armitage | Wing | 15 December 1983 (aged 27) | 21 | (England) London Irish |
| Chris Ashton | Wing | 29 March 1987 (aged 24) | 12 | (England) Northampton Saints |
| Matt Banahan | Wing | 30 December 1986 (aged 24) | 13 | (England) Bath |
| Mark Cueto | Wing | 26 December 1979 (aged 31) | 52 | (England) Sale Sharks |
| Ben Foden | Fullback | 22 July 1985 (aged 26) | 16 | (England) Northampton Saints |

=== Georgia ===
Georgia named their 30-man squad on 22 August.

Head coach: (Scotland) Richie Dixon

Note: Flags indicate national union for the club/province as defined by World Rugby.

| Player | Position | Date of birth (age) | Caps | Club/province |
|---|---|---|---|---|
| Jaba Bregvadze | Hooker | 23 April 1987 (aged 24) | 13 | (Georgia (country)) Army |
| Akvsenti Giorgadze | Hooker | 4 June 1976 (aged 35) | 62 | (France) Castres |
| Vasil Kakovin | Prop | 1 December 1989 (aged 21) | 15 | (France) Brive |
| Davit Khinchagishvili | Prop | 24 July 1982 (aged 29) | 35 | (France) Brive |
| Davit Kubriashvili | Prop | 12 March 1986 (aged 25) | 17 | (France) Toulon |
| Goderdzi Shvelidze | Prop | 17 April 1978 (aged 33) | 61 | (France) Montpellier |
| Davit Zirakashvili | Prop | 10 October 1983 (aged 27) | 28 | (France) Clermont |
| Levan Datunashvili | Lock | 18 January 1983 (aged 28) | 42 | (France) Aurillac |
| Vakhtang Maisuradze | Lock | 11 March 1987 (aged 24) | 8 | (France) Saint Nazaire |
| Giorgi Nemsadze | Lock | 26 September 1984 (aged 26) | 22 | (France) Montauban |
| Ilia Zedginidze | Lock | 20 January 1977 (aged 34) | 63 | (France) Carqueiranne |
| Givi Berishvili | Flanker | 10 August 1987 (aged 24) | 3 | (Georgia (country)) RC Locomotive Tbilisi |
| Giorgi Chkhaidze | Flanker | 20 August 1981 (aged 30) | 48 | (France) Montpellier |
| Viktor Kolelishvili | Flanker | 9 October 1989 (aged 21) | 10 | (France) Clermont Espoirs |
| Shalva Sutiashvili | Flanker | 24 January 1984 (aged 27) | 20 | (France) Massy |
| Dimitri Basilaia | Number 8 | 27 November 1985 (aged 25) | 16 | (France) Aubenas |
| Mamuka Gorgodze | Number 8 | 14 July 1984 (aged 27) | 37 | (France) Montpellier |
| Irakli Abuseridze (c) | Scrum-half | 25 November 1977 (aged 33) | 72 | (France) Auxerre |
| Bidzina Samkharadze | Scrum-half | 2 October 1983 (aged 27) | 56 | (Georgia (country)) Army |
| Lasha Khmaladze | Fly-half | 20 January 1988 (aged 23) | 9 | (Georgia (country)) Lelo |
| Merab Kvirikashvili | Fly-half | 27 December 1983 (aged 27) | 52 | (France) Figeac |
| Lasha Malaghuradze | Fly-half | 6 February 1986 (aged 25) | 31 | (France) Béziers |
| Davit Kacharava | Centre | 16 January 1985 (aged 26) | 43 | (France) Nice |
| Alexander Todua | Centre | 2 November 1987 (aged 23) | 24 | (Georgia (country)) Lelo |
| Tedo Zibzibadze | Centre | 6 September 1980 (aged 31) | 56 | (France) Périgueux |
| Irakli Chkhikvadze | Wing | 5 October 1987 (aged 23) | 25 | (Georgia (country)) AIA |
| Lexo Gugava | Wing | 17 August 1982 (aged 29) | 22 | (Georgia (country)) Lelo |
| Irakli Machkhaneli | Wing | 18 July 1981 (aged 30) | 48 | (France) Mâcon |
| Revaz Gigauri | Fullback | 9 May 1984 (aged 27) | 31 | (France) Figeac |
| Malkhaz Urjukashvili | Fullback | 24 September 1980 (aged 30) | 67 | (France) Gourdon |

=== Romania ===
Romania's 30-man RWC squad. Cătălin Fercu was forced to withdraw after his fear of flying prevented him from travelling to New Zealand; Adrian Apostol replaced him.

Head coach: (Romania) Romeo Gontineac

Note: Flags indicate national union for the club/province as defined by World Rugby.

| Player | Position | Date of birth (age) | Caps | Club/province |
|---|---|---|---|---|
| Marius Țincu (c) | Hooker | 7 March 1978 (aged 33) | 42 | (France) Perpignan |
| Bogdan Zebega | Hooker | 21 February 1984 (aged 27) | 30 | (Romania) Steaua |
| Nicolae Dragoș Dima | Prop | 30 July 1979 (aged 32) | 35 | (France) Blagnac |
| Silviu Florea | Prop | 19 April 1977 (aged 34) | 25 | (France) Bordeaux |
| Paulică Ion | Prop | 10 January 1983 (aged 28) | 40 | (England) London Irish |
| Mihaita Lazăr | Prop | 3 November 1986 (aged 24) | 12 | (France) Aix-en-Provence |
| Nicolae Nere | Prop | 12 June 1981 (aged 30) | 17 | (Romania) Steaua |
| Cristian Petre | Lock | 22 March 1979 (aged 32) | 77 | (France) Saint-Étienne |
| Valentin Popârlan | Lock | 6 April 1987 (aged 24) | 4 | (Romania) CSM București |
| Cosmin Rațiu | Lock | 18 July 1979 (aged 32) | 28 | (Romania) Dinamo |
| Valentin Ursache | Lock | 12 August 1985 (aged 26) | 33 | (France) Aix-en-Provence |
| Stelian Burcea | Flanker | 7 October 1983 (aged 27) | 27 | (Romania) Timişoara |
| Daniel Ianuș | Flanker | 11 April 1987 (aged 24) | 8 | (Romania) Steaua |
| Mihai Macovei | Flanker | 29 October 1986 (aged 24) | 20 | (Romania) Baia Mare |
| Daniel Carpo | Number 8 | 26 November 1984 (aged 26) | 27 | (Romania) Farul Constanța |
| Ovidiu Tonița | Number 8 | 6 August 1980 (aged 31) | 55 | (France) Perpignan |
| Valentin Calafeteanu | Scrum-half | 25 January 1985 (aged 26) | 35 | (Romania) Timişoara |
| Lucian Sîrbu | Scrum-half | 16 October 1976 (aged 34) | 67 | (France) Millau |
| Florin Surugiu | Scrum-half | 10 December 1984 (aged 26) | 9 | (Romania) CSM București |
| Ionuț Dimofte | Fly-half | 30 September 1984 (aged 26) | 52 | (Romania) Baia Mare |
| Dănuț Dumbravă | Fly-half | 6 August 1981 (aged 30) | 55 | (Romania) Steaua |
| Ionel Cazan | Centre | 25 November 1988 (aged 22) | 6 | (Romania) Steaua |
| Csaba Gál | Centre | 7 March 1985 (aged 26) | 34 | (Romania) Baia Mare |
| Constantin Gheară | Centre | 2 September 1981 (aged 30) | 6 | (Romania) Farul Constanța |
| Adrian Apostol | Wing | 11 March 1990 (aged 21) | 1 | (Romania) Farul Constanța |
| Ștefan Ciuntu | Wing | 10 April 1986 (aged 25) | 24 | (Romania) Baia Mare |
| Mădălin Lemnaru | Wing | 26 March 1989 (aged 22) | 7 | (Romania) Timişoara |
| Cătălin Nicolae | Wing | 22 July 1980 (aged 31) | 17 | (Romania) Farul Constanța |
| Iulian Dumitraș | Fullback | 22 June 1982 (aged 29) | 30 | (France) Lourdes |
| Florin Vlaicu | Fullback | 26 July 1986 (aged 25) | 40 | (Romania) Steaua |

=== Scotland ===
Scotland's 30-man squad was announced on 22 August 2011.

Head coach: (England) Andy Robinson

Note: Flags indicate national union for the club/province as defined by World Rugby.

| Player | Position | Date of birth (age) | Caps | Club/province |
|---|---|---|---|---|
| Ross Ford | Hooker | 23 April 1984 (aged 27) | 49 | (Scotland) Edinburgh |
| Dougie Hall | Hooker | 24 September 1980 (aged 30) | 36 | (Scotland) Glasgow Warriors |
| Scott Lawson | Hooker | 28 September 1981 (aged 29) | 28 | (England) Gloucester |
| Geoff Cross | Prop | 11 December 1982 (aged 28) | 6 | (Scotland) Edinburgh |
| Alasdair Dickinson | Prop | 11 September 1983 (aged 27) | 21 | (England) Sale Sharks |
| Allan Jacobsen | Prop | 22 September 1978 (aged 32) | 56 | (Scotland) Edinburgh |
| Moray Low | Prop | 28 November 1984 (aged 26) | 15 | (Scotland) Glasgow Warriors |
| Euan Murray | Prop | 7 August 1980 (aged 31) | 39 | (England) Newcastle Falcons |
| Richie Gray | Lock | 24 August 1989 (aged 22) | 12 | (Scotland) Glasgow Warriors |
| Jim Hamilton | Lock | 17 November 1982 (aged 28) | 32 | (England) Gloucester |
| Nathan Hines | Lock | 29 November 1976 (aged 34) | 73 | (France) Clermont |
| Alastair Kellock (c) | Lock | 14 June 1981 (aged 30) | 34 | (Scotland) Glasgow Warriors |
| John Barclay | Flanker | 24 September 1986 (aged 24) | 29 | (Scotland) Glasgow Warriors |
| Kelly Brown | Flanker | 8 June 1982 (aged 29) | 46 | (England) Saracens |
| Ross Rennie | Flanker | 29 March 1986 (aged 25) | 8 | (Scotland) Edinburgh |
| Alasdair Strokosch | Flanker | 21 February 1983 (aged 28) | 20 | (England) Gloucester |
| Richie Vernon | Number 8 | 7 July 1987 (aged 24) | 12 | (England) Sale Sharks |
| Mike Blair | Scrum-half | 20 April 1981 (aged 30) | 72 | (Scotland) Edinburgh |
| Chris Cusiter | Scrum-half | 13 June 1982 (aged 29) | 53 | (Scotland) Glasgow Warriors |
| Rory Lawson | Scrum-half | 12 March 1981 (aged 30) | 28 | (England) Gloucester |
| Ruaridh Jackson | Fly-half | 12 February 1988 (aged 23) | 8 | (Scotland) Glasgow Warriors |
| Dan Parks | Fly-half | 26 May 1978 (aged 33) | 62 | (Wales) Cardiff Blues |
| Joe Ansbro | Centre | 29 October 1985 (aged 25) | 7 | (England) London Irish |
| Nick De Luca | Centre | 1 February 1984 (aged 27) | 26 | (Scotland) Edinburgh |
| Graeme Morrison | Centre | 17 October 1982 (aged 28) | 30 | (Scotland) Glasgow Warriors |
| Simon Danielli | Wing | 8 September 1979 (aged 32) | 30 | (Ireland) Ulster |
| Max Evans | Wing | 12 September 1983 (aged 27) | 20 | (France) Castres |
| Sean Lamont | Wing | 15 January 1981 (aged 30) | 56 | (Wales) Scarlets |
| Rory Lamont | Fullback | 10 October 1982 (aged 28) | 25 | (France) Toulon |
| Chris Paterson | Fullback | 30 March 1978 (aged 33) | 105 | (Scotland) Edinburgh |

== Pool C ==
=== Australia ===
The 30-man squad for the RWC was announced on 18 August, with James Horwill replacing Rocky Elsom as the new captain. Wycliff Palu and Drew Mitchell were ruled out after the Russia test, Hodgson and Turner replaced them.

Head coach: (New Zealand) Robbie Deans

Note: Flags indicate national union for the club/province as defined by World Rugby.

| Player | Position | Date of birth (age) | Caps | Club/province |
|---|---|---|---|---|
| Saia Fainga'a | Hooker | 2 February 1987 (aged 24) | 13 | (Australia) Reds |
| Stephen Moore | Hooker | 20 January 1983 (aged 28) | 59 | (Australia) Brumbies |
| Tatafu Polota-Nau | Hooker | 26 July 1985 (aged 26) | 25 | (Australia) Waratahs |
| Ben Alexander | Prop | 13 November 1984 (aged 26) | 28 | (Australia) Brumbies |
| Sekope Kepu | Prop | 5 February 1986 (aged 25) | 7 | (Australia) Waratahs |
| Salesi Ma'afu | Prop | 22 March 1983 (aged 28) | 10 | (Australia) Western Force |
| James Slipper | Prop | 6 June 1989 (aged 22) | 14 | (Australia) Reds |
| James Horwill (c) | Lock | 29 May 1985 (aged 26) | 27 | (Australia) Reds |
| Nathan Sharpe | Lock | 26 February 1978 (aged 33) | 95 | (Australia) Western Force |
| Rob Simmons | Lock | 19 April 1989 (aged 22) | 8 | (Australia) Reds |
| Dan Vickerman | Lock | 4 June 1979 (aged 32) | 56 | (Australia) Waratahs |
| Rocky Elsom | Flanker | 14 February 1983 (aged 28) | 68 | (Australia) Brumbies |
| Scott Higginbotham | Flanker | 5 September 1986 (aged 25) | 5 | (Australia) Reds |
| Matt Hodgson | Flanker | 25 June 1981 (aged 30) | 6 | (Australia) Western Force |
| David Pocock | Flanker | 23 April 1988 (aged 23) | 33 | (Australia) Western Force |
| Ben McCalman | Number 8 | 18 March 1988 (aged 23) | 12 | (Australia) Western Force |
| Radike Samo | Number 8 | 9 July 1976 (aged 35) | 7 | (Australia) Reds |
| Luke Burgess | Scrum-half | 20 August 1983 (aged 28) | 32 | (France) Toulouse |
| Will Genia | Scrum-half | 17 January 1988 (aged 23) | 26 | (Australia) Reds |
| Nick Phipps | Scrum-half | 9 January 1989 (aged 22) | 2 | (Australia) Melbourne Rebels |
| Berrick Barnes | Fly-half | 28 May 1986 (aged 25) | 31 | (Australia) Waratahs |
| Quade Cooper | Fly-half | 5 April 1988 (aged 23) | 27 | (Australia) Reds |
| Adam Ashley-Cooper | Centre | 27 March 1984 (aged 27) | 55 | (Australia) Waratahs |
| Anthony Fainga'a | Centre | 2 February 1987 (aged 24) | 6 | (Australia) Reds |
| Rob Horne | Centre | 15 August 1989 (aged 22) | 6 | (Australia) Waratahs |
| Pat McCabe | Centre | 21 March 1988 (aged 23) | 5 | (Australia) Brumbies |
| Digby Ioane | Wing | 14 July 1985 (aged 26) | 15 | (Australia) Reds |
| James O'Connor | Wing | 5 July 1990 (aged 21) | 30 | (Australia) Melbourne Rebels |
| Lachlan Turner | Wing | 11 May 1987 (aged 24) | 14 | (Australia) Waratahs |
| Kurtley Beale | Fullback | 6 January 1989 (aged 22) | 18 | (Australia) Melbourne Rebels |

=== Ireland ===
Ireland's 30-man squad for the tournament was announced on 22 August 2011. Shane Jennings was called up to replace David Wallace after the latter suffered a knee injury in Ireland's final warm-up Test against England. On 14 September Damien Varley was called up to replace Jerry Flannery after Flannery tore his left calf muscle during a training session.

Head coach: (Ireland) Declan Kidney

Note: Flags indicate national union for the club/province as defined by World Rugby.

| Player | Position | Date of birth (age) | Caps | Club/province |
|---|---|---|---|---|
| Rory Best | Hooker | 15 August 1982 (aged 29) | 49 | (Ireland) Ulster |
| Seán Cronin | Hooker | 6 May 1986 (aged 25) | 13 | (Ireland) Connacht |
| Damien Varley | Hooker | 29 October 1983 (aged 27) | 2 | (Ireland) Munster |
| Tony Buckley | Prop | 8 October 1980 (aged 30) | 23 | (England) Sale Sharks |
| Tom Court | Prop | 6 November 1980 (aged 30) | 20 | (Ireland) Ulster |
| Cian Healy | Prop | 7 October 1987 (aged 23) | 20 | (Ireland) Leinster |
| Mike Ross | Prop | 21 December 1979 (aged 31) | 9 | (Ireland) Leinster |
| Leo Cullen | Lock | 9 January 1978 (aged 33) | 31 | (Ireland) Leinster |
| Donncha O'Callaghan | Lock | 24 March 1979 (aged 32) | 74 | (Ireland) Munster |
| Paul O'Connell | Lock | 20 October 1979 (aged 31) | 77 | (Ireland) Munster |
| Donnacha Ryan | Lock | 11 December 1983 (aged 27) | 9 | (Ireland) Munster |
| Stephen Ferris | Flanker | 2 August 1985 (aged 26) | 25 | (Ireland) Ulster |
| Shane Jennings | Flanker | 8 July 1981 (aged 30) | 10 | (Ireland) Leinster |
| Seán O'Brien | Flanker | 14 February 1987 (aged 24) | 11 | (Ireland) Leinster |
| Jamie Heaslip | Number 8 | 15 December 1983 (aged 27) | 37 | (Ireland) Leinster |
| Denis Leamy | Number 8 | 27 November 1981 (aged 29) | 52 | (Ireland) Munster |
| Isaac Boss | Scrum-half | 9 April 1980 (aged 31) | 14 | (Ireland) Leinster |
| Conor Murray | Scrum-half | 20 April 1989 (aged 22) | 2 | (Ireland) Munster |
| Eoin Reddan | Scrum-half | 20 November 1980 (aged 30) | 31 | (Ireland) Leinster |
| Ronan O'Gara | Fly-half | 7 March 1977 (aged 34) | 110 | (Ireland) Munster |
| Johnny Sexton | Fly-half | 11 July 1985 (aged 26) | 18 | (Ireland) Leinster |
| Gordon D'Arcy | Centre | 10 February 1980 (aged 31) | 58 | (Ireland) Leinster |
| Fergus McFadden | Centre | 17 June 1986 (aged 25) | 4 | (Ireland) Leinster |
| Brian O'Driscoll (c) | Centre | 21 January 1979 (aged 32) | 113 | (Ireland) Leinster |
| Paddy Wallace | Centre | 27 August 1979 (aged 32) | 28 | (Ireland) Ulster |
| Tommy Bowe | Wing | 22 February 1984 (aged 27) | 39 | (Wales) Ospreys |
| Keith Earls | Wing | 2 October 1987 (aged 23) | 20 | (Ireland) Munster |
| Andrew Trimble | Wing | 20 October 1984 (aged 26) | 35 | (Ireland) Ulster |
| Rob Kearney | Fullback | 26 March 1986 (aged 25) | 29 | (Ireland) Leinster |
| Geordan Murphy | Fullback | 19 April 1978 (aged 33) | 69 | (England) Leicester Tigers |

=== Italy ===
Nick Mallett announced his 30-man squad for the tournament on 22 July. Tommaso D'Apice returned to Italy after damaging ligaments in his left knee and was replaced by Franco Sbaraglini.

Head coach: (South Africa) Nick Mallett

Note: Flags indicate national union for the club/province as defined by World Rugby.

| Player | Position | Date of birth (age) | Caps | Club/province |
|---|---|---|---|---|
| Leonardo Ghiraldini | Hooker | 26 December 1984 (aged 26) | 38 | (Italy) Benetton Treviso |
| Fabio Ongaro | Hooker | 23 September 1977 (aged 33) | 77 | (Italy) Aironi |
| Franco Sbaraglini | Hooker | 3 December 1982 (aged 28) | 5 | (Italy) Benetton Treviso |
| Martin Castrogiovanni | Prop | 21 October 1981 (aged 29) | 78 | (England) Leicester Tigers |
| Lorenzo Cittadini | Prop | 17 December 1982 (aged 28) | 6 | (Italy) Benetton Treviso |
| Andrea Lo Cicero | Prop | 7 May 1976 (aged 35) | 88 | (France) Racing Métro |
| Salvatore Perugini | Prop | 6 March 1978 (aged 33) | 80 | (Italy) Aironi |
| Marco Bortolami | Lock | 12 June 1980 (aged 31) | 85 | (Italy) Aironi |
| Carlo Del Fava | Lock | 1 July 1981 (aged 30) | 53 | (Italy) Aironi |
| Quintin Geldenhuys | Lock | 19 June 1981 (aged 30) | 22 | (Italy) Aironi |
| Corniel van Zyl | Lock | 27 January 1979 (aged 32) | 2 | (Italy) Benetton Treviso |
| Robert Barbieri | Flanker | 5 June 1984 (aged 27) | 15 | (Italy) Benetton Treviso |
| Mauro Bergamasco | Flanker | 1 May 1979 (aged 32) | 85 | (France) Stade Français |
| Paul Derbyshire | Flanker | 3 November 1986 (aged 24) | 12 | (Italy) Benetton Treviso |
| Alessandro Zanni | Flanker | 31 January 1984 (aged 27) | 54 | (Italy) Benetton Treviso |
| Sergio Parisse (c) | Number 8 | 12 September 1983 (aged 27) | 79 | (France) Stade Français |
| Pablo Canavosio | Scrum-half | 26 December 1981 (aged 29) | 37 | (Italy) Calvisano |
| Edoardo Gori | Scrum-half | 5 March 1990 (aged 21) | 5 | (Italy) Benetton Treviso |
| Fabio Semenzato | Scrum-half | 6 May 1986 (aged 25) | 5 | (Italy) Benetton Treviso |
| Riccardo Bocchino | Fly-half | 3 March 1988 (aged 23) | 8 | (Italy) Cavalieri Prato |
| Luciano Orquera | Fly-half | 12 October 1981 (aged 29) | 24 | (Italy) Aironi |
| Gonzalo Canale | Centre | 11 November 1982 (aged 28) | 68 | (France) Clermont |
| Gonzalo García | Centre | 18 February 1984 (aged 27) | 22 | (Italy) Benetton Treviso |
| Matteo Pratichetti | Centre | 27 July 1985 (aged 26) | 23 | (Italy) Aironi |
| Alberto Sgarbi | Centre | 26 November 1986 (aged 24) | 13 | (Italy) Benetton Treviso |
| Tommaso Benvenuti | Wing | 12 December 1990 (aged 20) | 8 | (Italy) Benetton Treviso |
| Mirco Bergamasco | Wing | 23 February 1983 (aged 28) | 82 | (France) Racing Métro |
| Giulio Toniolatti | Wing | 15 January 1984 (aged 27) | 6 | (Italy) Aironi |
| Andrea Masi | Fullback | 30 March 1981 (aged 30) | 61 | (Italy) Aironi |
| Luke McLean | Fullback | 29 June 1987 (aged 24) | 28 | (Italy) Benetton Treviso |

=== Russia ===
Russia announced their 30-man squad for the tournament on 23 August. Igor Galinovskiy was ruled out with a broken leg, Sergey Trishin replaced him.

Head coach: (Russia) Nikolay Nerush

Note: Flags indicate national union for the club/province as defined by World Rugby.

| Player | Position | Date of birth (age) | Caps | Club/province |
|---|---|---|---|---|
| Vladislav Korshunov (c) | Hooker | 13 February 1983 (aged 28) | 54 | (England) London Wasps |
| Evgeny Matveev | Hooker | 15 April 1985 (aged 26) | 29 | (Russia) VVA Podmoskovye |
| Valery Tsnobiladze | Hooker | 3 November 1980 (aged 30) | 4 | (Russia) Novokuznetsk |
| Alexander Khrokin | Prop | 10 July 1976 (aged 35) | 67 | (Russia) VVA Podmoskovye |
| Sergey Popov | Prop | 7 September 1982 (aged 29) | 14 | (Russia) Slava Moscow |
| Ivan Prishchepenko | Prop | 26 May 1982 (aged 29) | 33 | (Russia) Krasny Yar |
| Alexei Travkin | Prop | 2 August 1977 (aged 34) | 46 | (Russia) VVA Podmoskovye |
| Denis Antonov | Lock | 17 September 1986 (aged 24) | 2 | (Russia) Slava Moscow |
| Adam Byrnes | Lock | 29 July 1981 (aged 30) | 0 | (Australia) Melbourne Rebels |
| Andrei Ostrikov | Lock | 2 July 1987 (aged 24) | 15 | (England) Sale Sharks |
| Alexander Voytov | Lock | 7 December 1981 (aged 29) | 44 | (Russia) VVA Podmoskovye |
| Artem Fatakhov | Flanker | 8 September 1979 (aged 32) | 37 | (Russia) VVA Podmoskovye |
| Andrey Garbuzov | Flanker | 7 August 1983 (aged 28) | 31 | (Russia) Krasny Yar |
| Mikhail Sidorov | Flanker | 19 November 1986 (aged 24) | 1 | (Russia) Slava Moscow |
| Viacheslav Grachev | Number 8 | 22 April 1973 (aged 38) | 36 | (France) Bizanos |
| Victor Gresev | Number 8 | 31 March 1986 (aged 25) | 32 | (England) London Wasps |
| Andrei Bykanov | Scrum-half | 25 May 1980 (aged 31) | 7 | (Russia) Slava Moscow |
| Alexander Shakirov | Scrum-half | 20 January 1981 (aged 30) | 46 | (Russia) VVA Podmoskovye |
| Alexander Yanyushkin | Scrum-half | 30 October 1982 (aged 28) | 42 | (Russia) VVA Podmoskovye |
| Yuri Kushnarev | Fly-half | 6 June 1985 (aged 26) | 43 | (Russia) VVA Podmoskovye |
| Konstantin Rachkov | Fly-half | 8 October 1978 (aged 32) | 26 | (France) Stade Phocéen |
| Mikhail Babaev | Centre | 19 January 1986 (aged 25) | 33 | (Russia) VVA Podmoskovye |
| Alexey Makovetskiy | Centre | 27 March 1983 (aged 28) | 11 | (Russia) Krasny Yar |
| Sergey Trishin | Centre | 12 December 1984 (aged 26) | 34 | (Russia) VVA Podmoskovye |
| Vasily Artemiev | Wing | 24 July 1987 (aged 24) | 25 | (England) Northampton Saints |
| Andrey Kuzin | Wing | 29 October 1978 (aged 32) | 59 | (Russia) VVA Podmoskovye |
| Vladimir Ostroushko | Wing | 30 September 1986 (aged 24) | 16 | (Russia) Enisey-STM |
| Denis Simplikevich | Wing | 11 March 1991 (aged 20) | 0 | (Russia) Enisey-STM |
| Igor Klyuchnikov | Fullback | 7 January 1983 (aged 28) | 49 | (Russia) VVA Podmoskovye |

=== United States ===
Eddie O'Sullivan announced his 30-man squad for the tournament on 22 August.

Head coach: (Ireland) Eddie O'Sullivan

Note: Flags indicate national union for the club/province as defined by World Rugby.

| Player | Position | Date of birth (age) | Caps | Club/province |
|---|---|---|---|---|
| Chris Biller | Hooker | 11 October 1985 (aged 25) | 13 | (England) Bath |
| Brian McClenahan | Hooker | 12 June 1982 (aged 29) | 2 | (United States) Olympic Club |
| Phil Thiel | Hooker | 29 October 1984 (aged 26) | 9 | (United States) Life University |
| Eric Fry | Prop | 14 October 1986 (aged 24) | 5 | (United States) Las Vegas |
| Mike MacDonald | Prop | 27 November 1980 (aged 30) | 62 | (England) Leeds Carnegie |
| Matekitonga Moeakiola | Prop | 16 May 1978 (aged 33) | 23 | (France) Bobigny |
| Shawn Pittman | Prop | 22 January 1988 (aged 23) | 13 | (England) London Welsh |
| Scott LaValla | Lock | 4 July 1988 (aged 23) | 6 | (France) Stade Français |
| Hayden Smith | Lock | 10 April 1985 (aged 26) | 14 | (England) Saracens |
| John van der Giessen | Lock | 6 May 1982 (aged 29) | 18 | Unattached |
| Inaki Basauri | Flanker | 1 October 1984 (aged 26) | 11 | (France) Périgueux |
| Todd Clever (c) | Flanker | 16 January 1983 (aged 28) | 37 | (Japan) Suntory Sungoliath |
| Pat Danahy | Flanker | 7 March 1985 (aged 26) | 5 | (United States) Life University |
| Louis Stanfill | Flanker | 30 May 1985 (aged 26) | 26 | Unattached |
| JJ Gagiano | Number 8 | 14 August 1985 (aged 26) | 13 | (South Africa) Univ. of Cape Town |
| Nic Johnson | Number 8 | 4 April 1983 (aged 28) | 14 | Unattached |
| Mike Petri | Scrum-half | 16 August 1984 (aged 27) | 22 | (United States) NYAC |
| Tim Usasz | Scrum-half | 21 June 1983 (aged 28) | 15 | (England) Nottingham |
| Nese Malifa | Fly-half | 10 September 1985 (aged 25) | 20 | (United States) Glendale |
| Roland Suniula | Fly-half | 17 December 1986 (aged 24) | 8 | (United States) Boston |
| Paul Emerick | Centre | 24 January 1980 (aged 31) | 44 | (England) London Wasps |
| Tai Enosa | Centre | 3 June 1989 (aged 22) | 5 | (United States) Belmont Shore |
| Junior Sifa | Centre | 24 March 1983 (aged 28) | 7 | Unattached |
| Andrew Suniula | Centre | 29 September 1982 (aged 28) | 9 | (England) Cornish Pirates |
| Colin Hawley | Wing | 10 April 1987 (aged 24) | 4 | (United States) Olympic Club |
| Takudzwa Ngwenya | Wing | 22 July 1985 (aged 26) | 19 | (France) Biarritz Olympique |
| James Paterson | Wing | 11 April 1987 (aged 24) | 1 | (New Zealand) Highlanders |
| Kevin Swiryn | Wing | 16 December 1984 (aged 26) | 12 | (France) Agen |
| Blaine Scully | Fullback | 29 February 1988 (aged 23) | 4 | Unattached |
| Chris Wyles | Fullback | 13 September 1983 (aged 27) | 23 | (England) Saracens |

== Pool D ==
=== Fiji ===
Fiji's 30-man World Cup squad.

Head coach: (Fiji) Sam Domoni

Note: Flags indicate national union for the club/province as defined by World Rugby.

| Player | Position | Date of birth (age) | Caps | Club/province |
|---|---|---|---|---|
| Sunia Koto | Hooker | 15 April 1980 (aged 31) | 29 | (France) Narbonne |
| Talemaitoga Tuapati | Hooker | 16 August 1984 (aged 27) | 9 | (New Zealand) Woodlands |
| Viliame Veikoso | Hooker | 4 April 1982 (aged 29) | 13 | (Fiji) Nadi |
| Waisea Daveta | Prop | 28 March 1989 (aged 22) | 2 | (Fiji) Suva |
| Campese Ma'afu | Prop | 19 December 1984 (aged 26) | 9 | (Australia) Eastern Suburbs |
| Deacon Manu (c) | Prop | 18 February 1979 (aged 32) | 9 | (Wales) Scarlets |
| Setefano Somoca | Prop | 10 February 1981 (aged 30) | 2 | (Fiji) Nadroga |
| Sekonaia Kalou | Lock | 6 April 1984 (aged 27) | 10 | (New Zealand) Kaikorai |
| Wame Lewaravu | Lock | 24 September 1983 (aged 27) | 13 | (England) Sale Sharks |
| Leone Nakarawa | Lock | 2 April 1988 (aged 23) | 7 | (Fiji) Suva |
| Rupeni Nasiga | Lock | 8 October 1985 (aged 25) | 8 | (Fiji) Nadroga |
| Akapusi Qera | Flanker | 24 April 1984 (aged 27) | 21 | (England) Gloucester |
| Malakai Ravulo | Flanker | 22 September 1983 (aged 27) | 6 | (New Zealand) North Harbour |
| Netani Talei | Flanker | 19 March 1983 (aged 28) | 16 | (Scotland) Edinburgh |
| Dominiko Waqaniburotu | Flanker | 20 April 1986 (aged 25) | 8 | (New Zealand) Fraser Tech |
| Sisa Koyamaibole | Number 8 | 6 March 1981 (aged 30) | 44 | (France) Lyon |
| Sakiusa Matadigo | Number 8 | 8 August 1982 (aged 29) | 5 | (France) Montpellier |
| Vitori Buatava | Scrum-half | 1 November 1985 (aged 25) | 9 | (Italy) Zhermack Badia |
| Nemia Kenatale | Scrum-half | 21 January 1986 (aged 25) | 11 | (Fiji) Tailevu |
| Nicky Little | Fly-half | 13 September 1976 (aged 34) | 67 | (England) Esher |
| Waisea Luveniyali | Fly-half | 23 July 1985 (aged 26) | 12 | Unattached |
| Seremaia Bai | Centre | 4 January 1979 (aged 32) | 39 | (France) Castres |
| Ravai Fatiaki | Centre | 1 March 1987 (aged 24) | 5 | (England) Worcester Warriors |
| Gabiriele Lovobalavu | Centre | 20 June 1985 (aged 26) | 12 | (France) Toulon |
| Albert Vulivuli | Centre | 26 May 1985 (aged 26) | 7 | (France) Racing Métro |
| Vereniki Goneva | Wing | 5 April 1984 (aged 27) | 17 | (France) Tarbes |
| Napolioni Nalaga | Wing | 7 April 1986 (aged 25) | 5 | (Australia) Western Force |
| Michael Tagicakibau | Wing | 9 May 1985 (aged 26) | 3 | (England) Saracens |
| Iliesa Keresoni | Fullback | 27 January 1987 (aged 24) | 8 | (France) Périgueux |
| Kini Murimurivalu | Fullback | 15 May 1989 (aged 22) | 2 | (France) Clermont |

=== Namibia ===
Namibia's 30-man Rugby World Cup squad.

Head coach: (Namibia) Johan Diergaardt

Note: Flags indicate national union for the club/province as defined by World Rugby.

| Player | Position | Date of birth (age) | Caps | Club/province |
|---|---|---|---|---|
| Hugo Horn | Hooker | 9 May 1977 (aged 34) | 31 | Unattached |
| Bertus O'Callaghan | Hooker | 18 February 1988 (aged 23) | 7 | (Namibia) Wanderers |
| Jané du Toit | Prop | 2 October 1975 (aged 35) | 19 | (South Africa) Hamilton |
| Raoul Larson | Prop | 14 May 1984 (aged 27) | 0 | (South Africa) Villagers |
| Johnny Redelinghuys | Prop | 2 February 1984 (aged 27) | 25 | (Namibia) Wanderers |
| Marius Visser | Prop | 24 April 1982 (aged 29) | 15 | (South Africa) Border Bulldogs |
| Nico Esterhuyse | Lock | 5 March 1984 (aged 27) | 26 | (Namibia) Keetmanshoop |
| Henk Franken | Lock | 16 January 1987 (aged 24) | 0 | (South Africa) Villagers |
| Uakazuwaka Kazombiaze | Lock | 25 January 1979 (aged 32) | 22 | (Namibia) Reho Falcons |
| Heinz Koll | Lock | 3 February 1982 (aged 29) | 9 | (England) London Wasps |
| Jacques Burger (c) | Flanker | 29 July 1983 (aged 28) | 25 | (England) Saracens |
| Tinus du Plessis | Flanker | 3 April 1984 (aged 27) | 26 | (England) London Wasps |
| Rohan Kitshoff | Flanker | 13 September 1985 (aged 25) | 5 | (South Africa) Western Province |
| Renaud van Neel | Flanker | 23 May 1988 (aged 23) | 0 | Namibia Uni |
| Jacques Nieuwenhuis | Number 8 | 23 March 1980 (aged 31) | 20 | (France) Stade Aurillac |
| PJ van Lill | Number 8 | 4 December 1983 (aged 27) | 15 | (France) Stade Aurillac |
| Ryan de la Harpe | Scrum-half | 2 September 1982 (aged 29) | 3 | (England) Moseley |
| Eugene Jantjies | Scrum-half | 8 October 1986 (aged 24) | 27 | (Romania) Farul Constanța |
| Theuns Kotzé | Fly-half | 16 July 1987 (aged 24) | 1 | (South Africa) Johannesburg Uni |
| Tertius Losper | Fly-half | 22 November 1985 (aged 25) | 9 | (Namibia) Western Suburbs |
| Darryl de la Harpe | Centre | 10 February 1986 (aged 25) | 7 | (Namibia) Western Suburbs |
| David Philander | Centre | 4 January 1987 (aged 24) | 9 | (Namibia) United |
| Danie van Wyk | Centre | 30 March 1986 (aged 25) | 3 | (Namibia) United |
| Piet van Zyl | Centre | 14 May 1979 (aged 32) | 14 | (France) Bourgoin |
| Heini Bock | Wing | 28 December 1981 (aged 29) | 23 | (Namibia) Reho Falcons |
| Conrad Marais | Wing | 26 April 1989 (aged 22) | 2 | (France) Montpellier |
| McGrath van Wyk | Wing | 18 September 1987 (aged 23) | 9 | (Romania) Farul Constanța |
| Llewellyn Winckler | Wing | 7 September 1987 (aged 24) | 6 | (Namibia) Western Suburbs |
| Chrysander Botha | Fullback | 13 July 1988 (aged 23) | 14 | (Namibia) Kudus |
| Danie Dames | Fullback | 7 February 1986 (aged 25) | 0 | (South Africa) Leopards |

=== Samoa ===
Coach Fuimaono Tafua's 30-man Samoa squad for the tournament was announced on 24 August.

Head coach: (Samoa) Titimaea Tafua

Note: Flags indicate national union for the club/province as defined by World Rugby.

| Player | Position | Date of birth (age) | Caps | Club/province |
|---|---|---|---|---|
| Ole Avei | Hooker | 13 June 1983 (aged 28) | 2 | (France) Bordeaux |
| Ti’i Paulo | Hooker | 13 January 1983 (aged 28) | 6 | (France) Clermont |
| Mahonri Schwalger (c) | Hooker | 15 September 1978 (aged 32) | 36 | (New Zealand) Chiefs |
| Census Johnston | Prop | 6 May 1981 (aged 30) | 30 | (France) Toulouse |
| Logovi'i Mulipola | Prop | 11 March 1987 (aged 24) | 5 | (England) Leicester Tigers |
| Anthony Perenise | Prop | 18 October 1982 (aged 28) | 10 | (England) Bath |
| Sakaria Taulafo | Prop | 29 January 1983 (aged 28) | 10 | (England) London Wasps |
| Daniel Leo | Lock | 2 October 1982 (aged 28) | 26 | (France) Bordeaux |
| Filipo Levi | Lock | 6 September 1979 (aged 32) | 24 | (England) Nottingham |
| Joe Tekori | Lock | 17 December 1983 (aged 27) | 17 | (France) Castres |
| Kane Thompson | Lock | 9 January 1982 (aged 29) | 18 | (New Zealand) Chiefs |
| Maurie Fa'asavalu | Flanker | 12 January 1980 (aged 31) | 10 | (England) Harlequins |
| Manaia Salavea | Flanker | 26 March 1986 (aged 25) | 8 | (France) Narbonne |
| Ofisa Treviranus | Flanker | 31 March 1984 (aged 27) | 16 | (England) London Irish |
| Taiasina Tuifu'a | Flanker | 20 August 1984 (aged 27) | 3 | (England) Newcastle Falcons |
| George Stowers | Number 8 | 14 February 1979 (aged 32) | 19 | (Wales) Ospreys |
| Kahn Fotuali'i | Scrum-half | 22 May 1982 (aged 29) | 5 | (Wales) Ospreys |
| Junior Poluleuligaga | Scrum-half | 5 February 1981 (aged 30) | 18 | (England) Exeter Chiefs |
| Jeremy Su'a | Scrum-half | 10 November 1988 (aged 22) | 0 | (Australia) West Harbour |
| Tasesa Lavea | Fly-half | 10 January 1980 (aged 31) | 5 | (England) Sale Sharks |
| Tusi Pisi | Fly-half | 18 June 1982 (aged 29) | 3 | (New Zealand) Hurricanes |
| Eliota Fuimaono-Sapolu | Centre | 31 October 1980 (aged 30) | 19 | (England) Gloucester |
| Johnny Leota | Centre | 21 January 1984 (aged 27) | 2 | (England) Sale Sharks |
| Seilala Mapusua | Centre | 27 February 1980 (aged 31) | 19 | (Japan) Kubota Spears |
| George Pisi | Centre | 29 June 1986 (aged 25) | 7 | (England) Northampton Saints |
| David Lemi | Wing | 10 February 1982 (aged 29) | 29 | (Scotland) Glasgow Warriors |
| Sailosi Tagicakibau | Wing | 14 November 1982 (aged 28) | 18 | (England) London Irish |
| Alesana Tuilagi | Wing | 24 February 1981 (aged 30) | 22 | (England) Leicester Tigers |
| James So'oialo | Fullback | 22 March 1989 (aged 22) | 3 | (New Zealand) Northern United |
| Paul Williams | Fullback | 22 April 1983 (aged 28) | 7 | (France) Stade Français |

=== South Africa ===
On 23 August, South Africa named a 30-man squad for the 2011 Rugby World Cup in New Zealand. Zane Kirchner replaced the injured François Steyn on 2 October.

Head coach: (South Africa) Peter de Villiers

Note: Flags indicate national union for the club/province as defined by World Rugby.

| Player | Position | Date of birth (age) | Caps | Club/province |
|---|---|---|---|---|
| Bismarck du Plessis | Hooker | 22 May 1984 (aged 27) | 38 | (South Africa) Sharks |
| Chiliboy Ralepelle | Hooker | 11 September 1986 (aged 24) | 20 | (South Africa) Bulls |
| John Smit (c) | Hooker | 3 April 1978 (aged 33) | 106 | (England) Saracens |
| Jannie du Plessis | Prop | 16 November 1982 (aged 28) | 26 | (South Africa) Sharks |
| Tendai Mtawarira | Prop | 1 August 1985 (aged 26) | 28 | (South Africa) Sharks |
| Gurthrö Steenkamp | Prop | 12 June 1981 (aged 30) | 33 | (France) Toulouse |
| CJ van der Linde | Prop | 27 August 1980 (aged 31) | 72 | (South Africa) Lions |
| Bakkies Botha | Lock | 22 September 1979 (aged 31) | 74 | (France) Toulon |
| Victor Matfield | Lock | 11 May 1977 (aged 34) | 107 | (South Africa) Bulls |
| Johann Muller | Lock | 1 June 1980 (aged 31) | 23 | (Ireland) Ulster |
| Danie Rossouw | Lock | 6 May 1978 (aged 33) | 58 | (Japan) Suntory Sungoliath |
| Willem Alberts | Flanker | 11 May 1984 (aged 27) | 4 | (South Africa) Sharks |
| Heinrich Brüssow | Flanker | 21 July 1986 (aged 25) | 15 | (South Africa) Cheetahs |
| Schalk Burger | Flanker | 13 April 1983 (aged 28) | 63 | (South Africa) Stormers |
| Francois Louw | Flanker | 15 June 1985 (aged 26) | 7 | (England) Bath |
| Pierre Spies | Number 8 | 8 June 1985 (aged 26) | 42 | (South Africa) Bulls |
| Fourie du Preez | Scrum-half | 24 March 1982 (aged 29) | 57 | (Japan) Suntory Sungoliath |
| Francois Hougaard | Scrum-half | 6 April 1988 (aged 23) | 10 | (South Africa) Bulls |
| Ruan Pienaar | Scrum-half | 10 March 1984 (aged 27) | 49 | (Ireland) Ulster |
| Butch James | Fly-half | 8 January 1979 (aged 32) | 41 | (South Africa) Lions |
| Morné Steyn | Fly-half | 11 July 1984 (aged 27) | 29 | (South Africa) Bulls |
| Juan de Jongh | Centre | 15 April 1988 (aged 23) | 8 | (South Africa) Stormers |
| Jean de Villiers | Centre | 24 February 1981 (aged 30) | 69 | (South Africa) Stormers |
| Jaque Fourie | Centre | 4 March 1983 (aged 28) | 64 | (Japan) Panasonic Wild Knights |
| Gio Aplon | Wing | 6 October 1982 (aged 28) | 15 | (South Africa) Stormers |
| Bryan Habana | Wing | 12 June 1983 (aged 28) | 70 | (South Africa) Stormers |
| Odwa Ndungane | Wing | 20 February 1981 (aged 30) | 8 | (South Africa) Sharks |
| JP Pietersen | Wing | 12 July 1986 (aged 25) | 38 | (South Africa) Sharks |
| Patrick Lambie | Fullback | 17 October 1990 (aged 20) | 7 | (South Africa) Sharks |
| Zane Kirchner | Fullback | 16 June 1984 (aged 27) | 14 | (South Africa) Bulls |
| François Steyn | Fullback | 14 May 1987 (aged 24) | 43 | (France) Racing Metro 92 |

=== Wales ===
On 22 August, Wales named a 30-man squad for the 2011 Rugby World Cup in New Zealand.

Head coach: (New Zealand) Warren Gatland

Note: Flags indicate national union for the club/province as defined by World Rugby.

| Player | Position | Date of birth (age) | Caps | Club/province |
|---|---|---|---|---|
| Huw Bennett | Hooker | 11 June 1983 (aged 28) | 42 | (Wales) Ospreys |
| Lloyd Burns | Hooker | 9 December 1984 (aged 26) | 3 | (Wales) Newport Gwent Dragons |
| Ken Owens | Hooker | 3 January 1987 (aged 24) | 0 | (Wales) Scarlets |
| Ryan Bevington | Prop | 9 December 1988 (aged 22) | 4 | (Wales) Ospreys |
| Paul James | Prop | 13 May 1982 (aged 29) | 26 | (Wales) Ospreys |
| Gethin Jenkins | Prop | 17 November 1980 (aged 30) | 76 | (Wales) Cardiff Blues |
| Adam Jones | Prop | 8 March 1981 (aged 30) | 70 | (Wales) Ospreys |
| Craig Mitchell | Prop | 3 May 1986 (aged 25) | 10 | (England) Exeter Chiefs |
| Luke Charteris | Lock | 9 March 1983 (aged 28) | 25 | (Wales) Newport Gwent Dragons |
| Bradley Davies | Lock | 9 January 1987 (aged 24) | 24 | (Wales) Cardiff Blues |
| Alun Wyn Jones | Lock | 19 September 1985 (aged 25) | 52 | (Wales) Ospreys |
| Ryan Jones | Flanker | 13 March 1981 (aged 30) | 53 | (Wales) Ospreys |
| Dan Lydiate | Flanker | 18 December 1987 (aged 23) | 14 | (Wales) Newport Gwent Dragons |
| Sam Warburton (c) | Flanker | 5 October 1988 (aged 22) | 17 | (Wales) Cardiff Blues |
| Taulupe Faletau | Number 8 | 12 November 1990 (aged 20) | 3 | (Wales) Newport Gwent Dragons |
| Andy Powell | Number 8 | 23 August 1981 (aged 30) | 18 | (England) Sale Sharks |
| Tavis Knoyle | Scrum-half | 2 June 1990 (aged 21) | 5 | (Wales) Scarlets |
| Mike Phillips | Scrum-half | 29 August 1982 (aged 29) | 54 | (France) Bayonne |
| Lloyd Williams | Scrum-half | 30 November 1989 (aged 21) | 1 | (Wales) Cardiff Blues |
| James Hook | Fly-half | 27 June 1985 (aged 26) | 54 | (France) Perpignan |
| Stephen Jones | Fly-half | 8 December 1977 (aged 33) | 101 | (Wales) Scarlets |
| Rhys Priestland | Fly-half | 7 January 1987 (aged 24) | 4 | (Wales) Scarlets |
| Jonathan Davies | Centre | 5 April 1988 (aged 23) | 14 | (Wales) Scarlets |
| Jamie Roberts | Centre | 8 November 1986 (aged 24) | 32 | (Wales) Cardiff Blues |
| Scott Williams | Centre | 10 October 1990 (aged 20) | 4 | (Wales) Scarlets |
| Aled Brew | Wing | 9 August 1986 (aged 25) | 7 | (Wales) Newport Gwent Dragons |
| George North | Wing | 13 April 1992 (aged 19) | 8 | (Wales) Scarlets |
| Shane Williams | Wing | 26 February 1977 (aged 34) | 81 | (Wales) Ospreys |
| Lee Byrne | Fullback | 1 June 1980 (aged 31) | 44 | (France) Clermont |
| Leigh Halfpenny | Fullback | 22 December 1988 (aged 22) | 20 | (Wales) Cardiff Blues |

== Player statistics ==
=== Player representation by club ===
| Players | Clubs |
|---|---|
| 14 | (Ireland) Leinster, (Russia) VVA Podmoskovye |
| 13 | (France) Clermont, (France) Toulouse |
| 12 | (Italy) Benetton Treviso, (New Zealand) Crusaders, (France) Montpellier |
| 11 | (England) Leicester Tigers, (Wales) Ospreys |
| 10 | (Japan) Suntory Sungoliath, (Italy) Aironi, (Australia) Reds, (England) Sale Sharks, (Wales) Scarlets, (France) Stade Français |

=== Player representation by league ===
| League | Players | Percent | Outside national squad |
|---|---|---|---|
| Total | 600 | | |
| France | 126 | 21% | 96 |
| Celtic League | 105 | 18% | 13 |
| England | 81 | 14% | 55 |
| New Zealand | 48 | 8% | 18 |
| Japan | 36 | 6% | 7 |
| Australia | 35 | 6% | 5 |
| South Africa | 35 | 6% | 8 |
| Romania | 22 | 4% | 2 |
| Russia | 22 | 4% | — |
| Others | 90 | 15% | |

=== Average age of squads ===
| Average age | Countries |
|---|---|
| 26 | Australia, United States, Wales |
| 27 | Canada, Fiji, Georgia, Namibia, Russia |
| 28 | Argentina, England, France, Italy, Japan, New Zealand, Romania, Samoa, Scotland, South Africa, Tonga |
| 29 | Ireland |

Taylor Paris of Canada was the youngest player named to a squad at 18, while Russia's Viacheslav Grachev, 38, was the oldest. However, Paris did not appear in any of Canada's matches, making Wales' 19-year-old George North the youngest to actually appear in the World Cup.

=== Coaches representation by country ===
| Number | Country | Coaches |
|---|---|---|
| 6 | New Zealand | Kieran Crowley, Robbie Deans, Warren Gatland, Graham Henry, John Kirwan, Isitolo Maka |
| 2 | England | Martin Johnson, Andy Robinson |
| 2 | Ireland | Declan Kidney, Eddie O'Sullivan |
| 2 | South Africa | Peter de Villiers, Nick Mallett |
| 1 | 8 countries | |

=== Squad caps ===
| Pos. | Caps | Country | Most capped player |
|---|---|---|---|
| 1 | 1,224 | South Africa | Victor Matfield (107) |
| 2 | 1,139 | New Zealand | Mils Muliaina (98), Richie McCaw (100) |
| 3 | 1,068 | Ireland | Brian O'Driscoll (113) |
| 4 | 1,038 | Scotland | Chris Paterson (105) |
| 5 | 1,036 | Georgia | Irakli Abuseridze (72) |
| 6 | 1,011 | France | Damien Traille (83) |
| 7 | 1,008 | Italy | Andrea Lo Cicero (88) |
| 8 | 896 | England | Jonny Wilkinson (86) |
| 9 | 865 | Wales | Stephen Jones (100) |
| 10 | 863 | Romania | Cristian Petre (77) |
| 11 | 820 | Russia | Alexander Khrokin (67) |
| 12 | 811 | Australia | Nathan Sharpe (95) |
| 13 | 685 | Japan | Hirotoki Onozawa (64) |
| 14 | 582 | Argentina | Mario Ledesma (78) |
| 15 | 475 | Canada | Ed Fairhurst (49) |
| 16 | 444 | United States | Mike MacDonald (62) |
| 17 | 408 | Fiji | Nicky Little (67) |
| 18 | 397 | Samoa | Mahonri Schwalger (36) |
| 19 | 366 | Namibia | Hugo Horn (31) |
| 20 | 300 | Tonga | Aleki Lutui, Ephraim Taukafa (30) |

South Africa had the most capped side in the World Cup with 1,224 caps. The most-capped player at the tournament was Brian O'Driscoll of Ireland, who entered the event with 113 caps for Ireland (not counting his appearances with the British and Irish Lions). Second on this list was his teammate Ronan O'Gara with 111.
