= Monty Ioane =

Italy international rugby union player

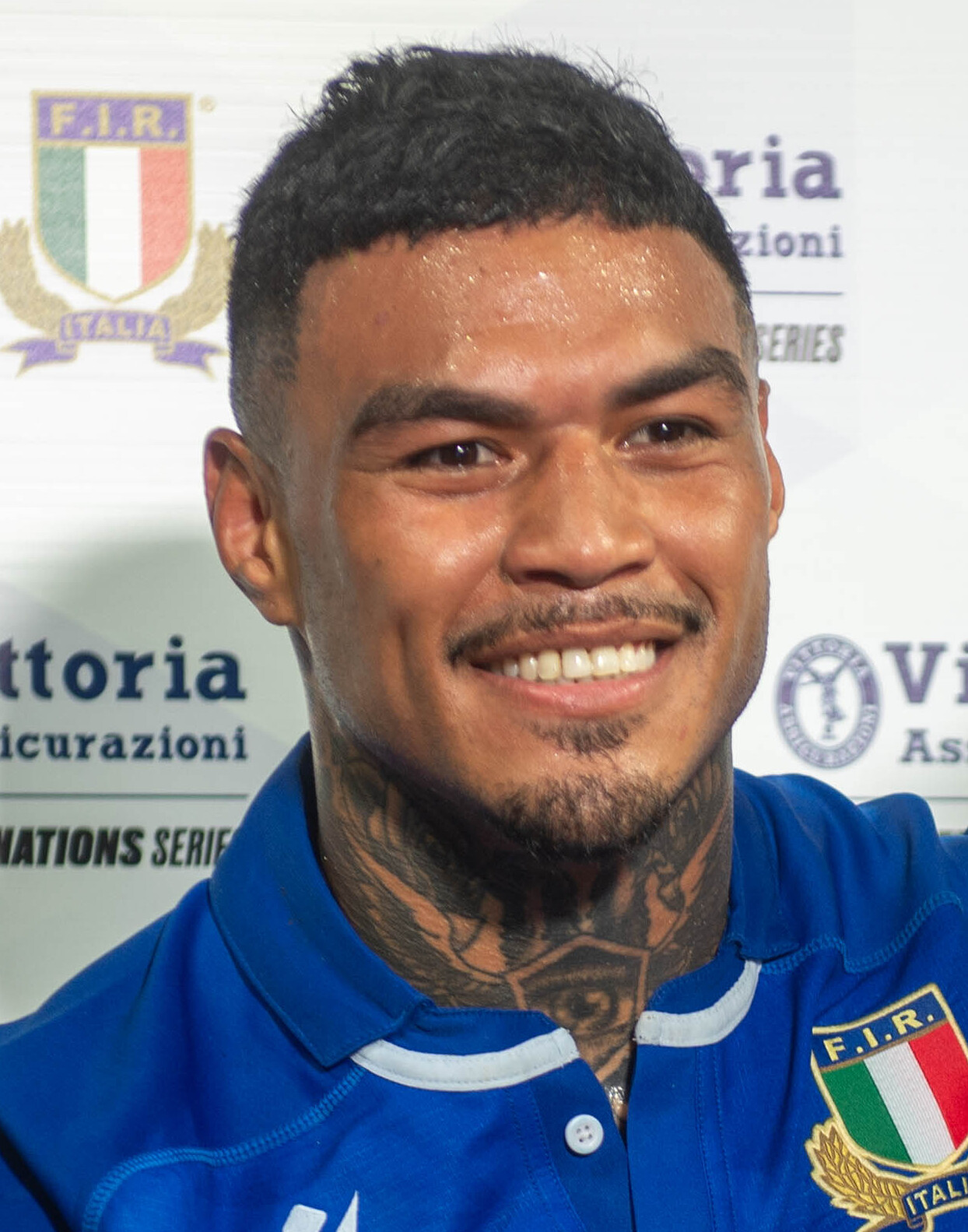
- Ioane in 2023
- Full name: Montanna Wilson Ioane
- Born: 30 October 1994 (age 32) Melbourne, Victoria, Australia
- Height: 180 cm (5 ft 11 in)
- Weight: 93 kg (205 lb; 14 st 9 lb)
- School: Anglican Church Grammar School
- Notable relative(s): Digby Ioane (uncle); Pete Samu (cousin); Ole Avei (cousin)

Rugby union career
- Position: Wing
- Current team: Lyon
Senior career
Years	Team	Apps	(Points)
2014	Stade Français	2	(0)
2015	Tasman	2	(0)
2016–2017	Bay of Plenty	22	(30)
2017–2022	Benetton	81	(155)
2023	Rebels	14	(10)
2023–	Lyon	32	(55)
- Correct as of 27 Nov 2025
International career
Years	Team	Apps	(Points)
2020–	Italy	49	(100)
- Correct as of 18 Jul 2026

Montanna Wilson Ioane (Samoan pronunciation: [uɑːneɪ]; born 30 October 1994) is an Australian-born Italian professional rugby union player who primarily plays wing for Lyon in the Top 14. He has also represented Italy at international level, having made his test debut against Wales during the Autumn Nations Cup. Ioane has previously played for clubs such as Stade Français, Tasman, Bay of Plenty, and Benetton.

On 22 August 2023, he was named in Italy's 33-man squad for the 2023 Rugby World Cup.

== Early life ==
Monty Ioane was born to a Samoan father, Paul, and a Fijian mother, Vika, in Melbourne, Victoria. As a young child he did not enjoy playing rugby and quit the sport until returning to it at age 12. After receiving a scholarship, Ioane moved to Brisbane, Queensland to attend Anglican Church Grammar School at age 16. He stated that the decision to leave his parents in order to attend boarding school was difficult but his uncle Digby Ioane was already based in Brisbane and playing for the Queensland Reds. Ioane played rugby while attending school and advanced to the Queensland Reds Academy.

At age 18, Ioane moved to Paris, France, to play professionally. His uncle Digby had signed with Stade Français and worked out a deal to have Monty sign to the club with him. In 2015, Digby shifted to playing in Japan while Monty moved to play in New Zealand.

== Professional career ==
=== Stade Français ===
After spending time at the Queensland Reds Academy, Ioane moved to France in November 2013 after signing to Stade Français, and was a part of their U21 squad, the Espoirs. Ioane played for the club in the first-tier French Top 14 competition during the 2014–15 season. He played six games for the club, and has described his time there as "a learning process."

=== Chiefs and Tasman Mako ===
In 2015, Ioane moved to New Zealand after he was recruited by Dave Rennie, head coach of the Chiefs in Super Rugby, to join their developmental squad. He played pre-season games with the squad in 2016, playing against the development squads of the Blues and Hurricanes, and against the Hong Kong national team in April.

He signed to play for the Bay of Plenty Steamers, but was immediately placed on loan to Tasman Mako, playing for them in the second-tier Championship during the 2015 ITM Cup.

=== Bay of Plenty ===
Ioane played for the Bay of Plenty Steamers in the second-tier Championship during the 2016 Mitre 10 Cup. In the 2017 season, Bay of Plenty reached the finals of the Championship but missed out on promotion after losing to Wellington. That year Ioane caught the eye of Antonio Pavanello, the sporting director of Benetton, who was looking to sign a wing for his club.

=== Benetton ===
In November 2017, Ioane signed to Italian side Benetton Rugby, making his return to Europe for the 2017–18 Pro14 season. He extended his contract with Benetton for a further two seasons until 2020.

When his contract expired, he re-signed until 2022, making himself eligible for a call to the Italian national team. According to World Rugby's rules prior to 2018, Ioane was eligible from November 2020 after completing three years of residency in Italy. In July 2020, for the first time, he was invited to take part to the Italian national team camp. In December 2020, he made the Italy squad again. He played with Benetton Rugby until September 2022.

== Statistics ==
=== List of international test tries ===
As of 14 November 2026

Try	Opposing team	Location	Venue	Competition	Date	Result	Score
1	England	London, England	Twickenham Stadium	2021 Six Nations Championship	13 February 2021	Loss	41 – 18
2	Wales	Rome, Italy	Stadio Olimpico	2021 Six Nations Championship	13 March 2021	Loss	7 – 48
3	Samoa	Padua, Italy	Stadio Plebiscito	2022 November Internationals	5 November 2022	Win	49 – 17
4	Samoa	Padua, Italy	Stadio Plebiscito	2022 November Internationals	5 November 2022	Win	49 – 17
5	Scotland	Edinburgh, Scotland	Murrayfield Stadium	2023 Rugby World Cup warm-up matches	29 July 2023	Loss	25 - 13
6	Romania	San Benedetto del Tronto, Italy	Stadio Riviera delle Palme	2023 Rugby World Cup warm-up matches	19 August 2023	Win	57 – 7
7	Japan	Treviso, Italy	Stadio Comunale di Monigo	2023 Rugby World Cup warm-up matches	26 August 2023	Win	42 – 21
8	Japan	Treviso, Italy	Stadio Comunale di Monigo	2023 Rugby World Cup warm-up matches	26 August 2023	Win	42 – 21
9	Japan	Treviso, Italy	Stadio Comunale di Monigo	2023 Rugby World Cup warm-up matches	26 August 2023	Win	42 – 21
10	Uruguay	Nice, France	Allianz Riviera	2023 Rugby World Cup	20 September 2023	Win	17 - 38
11	New Zealand	Lyon, France	Parc Olympique Lyonnais	2023 Rugby World Cup	29 September 2023	Loss	96 - 17
12	England	Rome, Italy	Stadio Olimpico	2024 Six Nations	3 February 2024	Loss	24 - 27
13	Wales	Cardiff, Wales	Millennium Stadium	2024 Six Nations	16 March 2024	Win	21-24
14	Samoa	Apia, Samoa	Apia Park	2024 July Internationals	5 July 2024	Loss	33-25
15	Tonga	Nuku’alofa, Tonga	Teufaiva Sport Stadium	2024 July Internationals	12 July 2024	Win	14-36
16	Ireland	Rome, Italy	Stadio Olimpico	2025 Six Nations	15 March 2025	Loss	17 - 22
17	Australia	Udine, Italy	Stadio Friuli	2025 November Internationals	8 November 2025	Win	26 - 19
18	Chile	Genoa, Italy	Stadio Luigi Ferraris	2025 November Internationals	22 November 2025	Win	34 – 19
19	Chile	Genoa, Italy	Stadio Luigi Ferraris	2025 November Internationals	22 November 2025	Win	34 – 19
20	Australia	Perth, Australia	Perth Rectangular Stadium	2026 Nations Championship	18 July 2026	Loss	57 - 10
21	Argentina	Genoa, Italy	Stadio Luigi Ferraris	2026 Nations Championship	14 November 2026	Loss	14 - 19

== Personal life ==
He is the nephew of Digby Ioane, and is the cousin of Pete Samu, both of whom have played for the Australia national rugby union team, and is the cousin of Ole Avei who plays for the Samoa national rugby union team.

Ioane has two daughters with his girlfriend Melisa Dasci. Ioane was born into a Catholic family but has stated he wasn't religious. While in Italy, aged 25, Ioane converted to Islam in June 2020 after meeting and being inspired by Austrian MMA fighter Wilhelm Ott who had converted in April during the COVID-19 lockdown. Ioane described himself as being in his room and "having a low point in [his] life" when he turned to and spoke with his partner Melisa, who was born Muslim, who "started talking about God" leading him to take an interest in studying religion. After Ott messaged him one day, the two met for dinner where he learned of how Ott had changed his life in a positive direction. Ioane later received religious assistance from Benetton teammate Cherif Traore.

He enjoys relaxing by playing the guitar or listening to music, and is an avid reader.

== Super Rugby statistics ==
As of 3 June 2023

Season	Team	Games	Starts	Sub	Mins	Tries	Cons	Pens	Drops	Points	Yel	Red
2023	Rebels	13	13	0	963	2	0	0	0	10	0	0
Total		13	13	0	963	2	0	0	0	10	0	0
