= McGrath van Wyk =

Namibia international rugby union player

- Born: 18 September 1987 (age 39) Windhoek, Namibia

Rugby union career
- Position: Wing
Senior career
Years	Team	Apps	(Points)
- RCJ Farul Constanța
International career
Years	Team	Apps	(Points)
2009-2011	Namibia	10	(10)
- Correct as of 9 September 2019

McGrath van Wyk (born 18 September 1987) is a former Namibian rugby union player who played as a wing represented Namibia internationally from 2009 to 2011. He made his international debut for Namibia against Ivory Coast on 14 June 2009. McGrath van Wyk was included in the Namibian squad for the 2011 Rugby World Cup.
