= Salesi Ma'afu =

Australian rugby union player (born 1983)

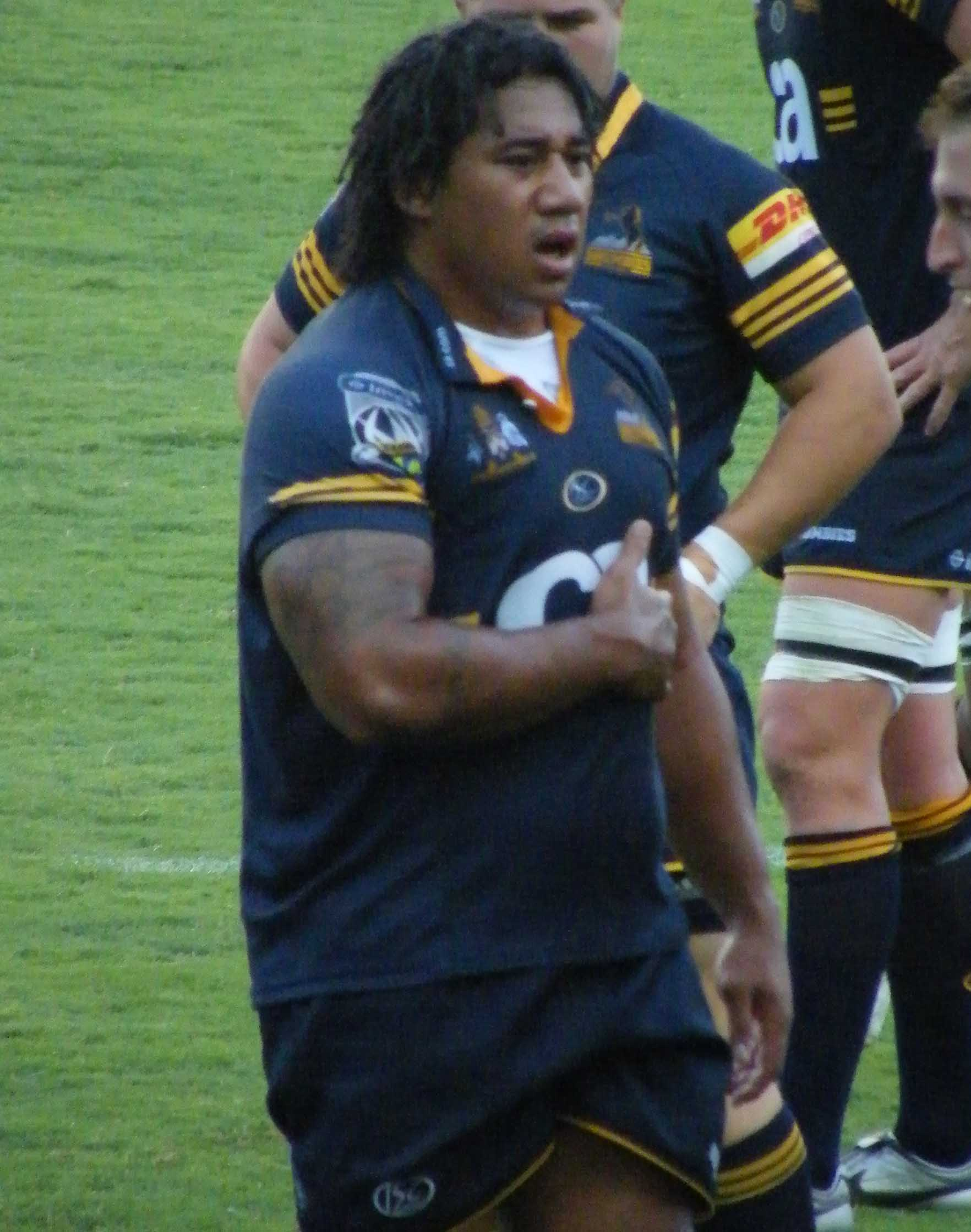
- Born: Salesi L. Ma'afu; 26 March 1983 (age 43) Sydney, New South Wales, Australia
- Height: 1.84 m (6 ft 1/2 in)
- Weight: 275 lb (125 kg)
- School: Granville and Ashfield Boys High Schools
- Notable relative(s): Campese Ma'afu (brother); Apakuki Ma'afu (brother); Tatafu Polota-Nau (cousin)

Rugby union career
- Position: Tighthead prop
Amateur team(s)
Years	Team	Apps	(Points)
2003–2008	Warringah		
Senior career
Years	Team	Apps	(Points)
2013–2015	Northampton Saints	62	(5)
2015	Toulon	(6)	(0)
2015-2016	Cardiff Blues	16	(5)
2016–2017	Gloucester Rugby	14	(10)
2017–2018	RC Narbonne	9	(0)
- Correct as of 16 February 2018
Super Rugby
Years	Team	Apps	(Points)
2004–2011	Brumbies	92	(20)
2012–2013	Western Force	23	(0)
- Correct as of 15 July 2013
International career
Years	Team	Apps	(Points)
2007–2008	Australia A		
2010–2011	Australia	14	(5)
–	West Harbour		
–	Joonadalup Brothers		
Medal record
Men's rugby union
Representing Australia
Rugby World Cup
Bronze medal – third place	2011 New Zealand	Squad

Salesi Ma'afu, (born 26 March 1983 in Camperdown, Sydney, New South Wales) is an Australian former professional rugby union footballer.

== Early life ==
Ma'afu was educated at Granville and Ashfield Boys High Schools in Sydney and played rugby league as a youngster in the Balmain district before starting up with rugby, aged 11. Ma'afu first made his mark at representative level in the NSW Under-19 side in 2001 and 2002, later featuring in the Waratahs Academy through 2004 and 2005.

== Club career ==
He signed with the ACT Brumbies in 2005 and made his Super Rugby debut in 2007. Ma'afu made the Australia A squad the same year, ending his year with a late-season appearance for the British Barbarians club during its 22-5 win over the new Rugby World Cup holders, South Africa. In the NSW club competition, after spending two years with Warringah, in 2009 Ma'afu returned to West Harbour, where he played alongside his brother Campese.

In 2011, Ma'afu signed to join the Perth-based Western Force, to commence 2012. He also is the club ambassador for local club, Joondalup Brothers RUFC, for whom himself and his children played.

Before the commencement of the 2013 Super Rugby season Ma'afu signed with the English Premiership side Northampton Saints ahead of the 2013/2014 season. Ma'afu became a regular in the side, helping them to victory in both the Premiership and the European Challenge Cup. On 13 June 2015, Maafu would join top French club Toulon in the Top 14 on a two-year contract. After being released from his contract by the club, Ma’afu spent a season at Cardiff Rugby. Ma'afu returned to Aviva Premiership to sign for English club Gloucester Rugby

On 23 May 2017, Maafu returns to France as he signed for Pro D2 side RC Narbonne ahead of the 2017-18 season.

== International career ==
Ma'afu's first test cap was in 2010 against Fiji, where he had the unusual challenge of marking his brother, who was also playing on debut. The pair became just the fourth set of brothers to oppose each other in Tests, and the first to achieve this feat when both were on debut. Subsequent tests in 2010 against England, Ireland, and South Africa completed a strong year for the prop.

In 2011 Ma'afu was selected in the Wallabies squad for the Rugby World Cup, in New Zealand.
