= John Ulugia =

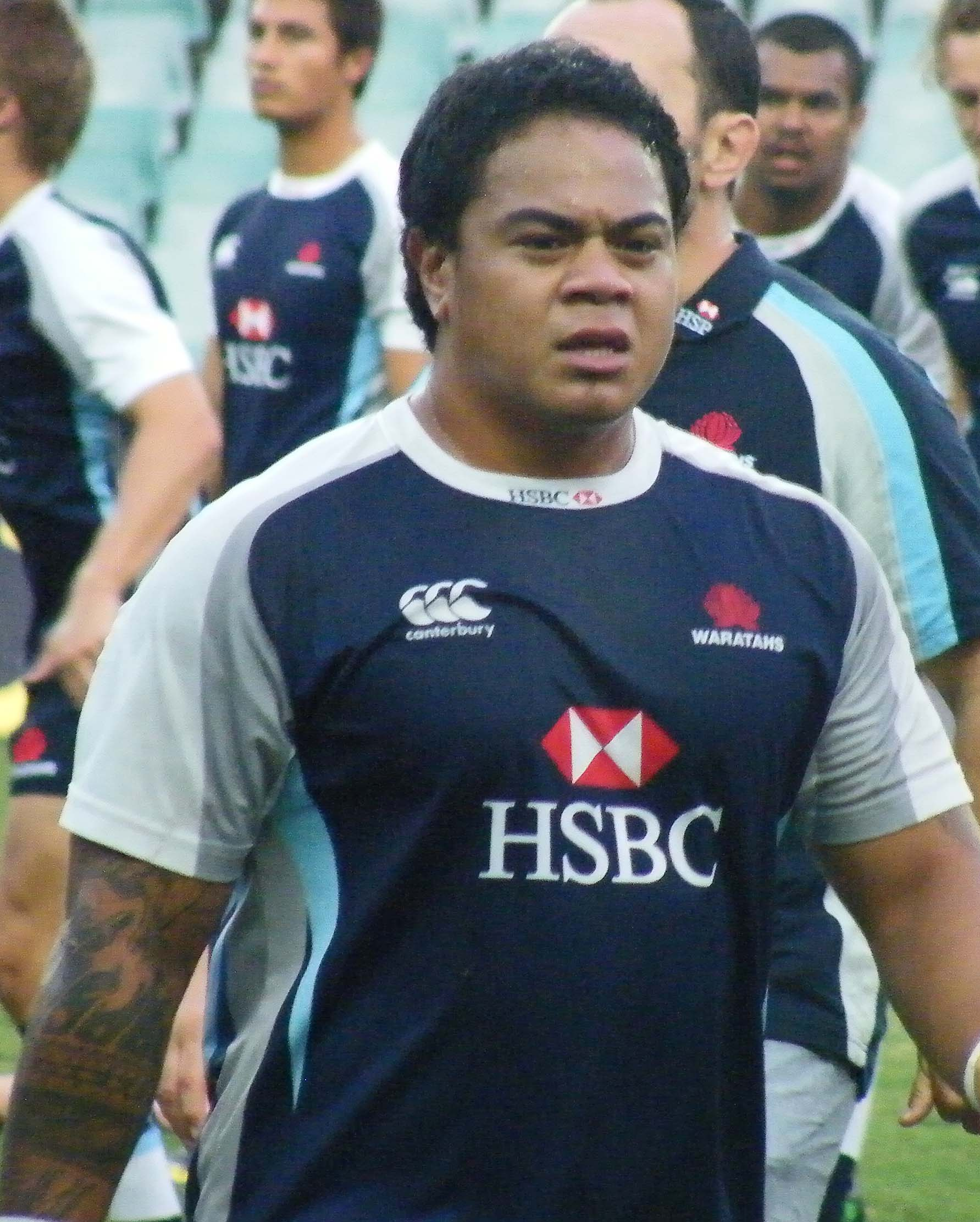
- Ulugia in 2011
- Born: 17 January 1986 (age 40) Auckland, New Zealand
- Height: 180 cm (5 ft 11 in)
- Weight: 113 kg (249 lb; 17 st 11 lb)
- School: Chisholm Institute
- Notable relatives: Digby Ioane (cousin); Pete Samu (cousin)

Rugby union career
- Position(s): Prop, Hooker
Senior career
Years	Team	Apps	(Points)
2006–2010	Brumbies	11	(0)
2007	Canberra Vikings	5	(0)
2011–2013	Waratahs	37	(10)
2013–2014	Bressane	27	(15)
2014–2020	Clermont	138	(45)
2020–2022	Bayonne	31	(30)
2023	ACT Brumbies	2	(0)
- Correct as of 30 June 2026
International career
Years	Team	Apps	(Points)
2004	Australian Schoolboys	3	(0)
2008	Australia A	4	(0)
- Correct as of 30 June 2026
Coaching career
- Years: Team
- 2023–2024: ACT Brumbies Academy (Forwards coach)
- 2024–: ACT Brumbies (Assistant coach)
- 2025: Australia U20 (Assistant coach)
- 2025–: Australia (Assistant/Scrum coach)
- Correct as of 30 June 2026

John Ulugia (born 17 January 1986) is an Australian rugby union coach and former player. He is currently the scrum coach for the ACT Brumbies in the Super Rugby and the Australia national team. During his playing career, he played for the Brumbies and Waratahs in the Super Rugby, Clermont and Bayonne in the French Top 14, and made four appearances for the Australia A national team. His primary playing position was prop and hooker.

== Early life and youth career ==
Ulugia was born in Auckland, New Zealand to a Samoan family in 1986. He grew up in Melbourne, Victoria, Australia after his family moved there when he was a child. In his youth he played Australian rules football, before later switching to rugby union. After initially playing in the back row, he was moved to the front row at 16-years-old after joining the ACT Brumbies and training at the Australian Institute of Sport (AIS) in Canberra.

== Career ==
He made his Super Rugby debut for the Brumbies during the 2006 season. Over four seasons with the Canberra-based franchise, opportunities were limited as he competed for selection behind established Wallabies hookers Jeremy Paul and Stephen Moore. He was released at the conclusion of the 2009 campaign, although he briefly returned the following season as injury cover for Ben Alexander. During this period, he also represented the Canberra Vikings in the inaugural and only edition of the Australian Rugby Championship in 2007.

Without a professional contract in 2010, he returned to club rugby with Southern Districts in the Shute Shield. His performances earned him a move to the Waratahs, where he joined as the third-choice hooker behind Tatafu Polota-Nau and Damien Fitzpatrick. Although initially viewed as a depth option, he enjoyed significantly greater opportunities than he had at the Brumbies, making 37 Super Rugby appearances across three seasons. Alongside his professional commitments, he also represented Eastern Suburbs in the Shute Shield.

In 2013, he departed Australia to join newly promoted French Pro D2 side US Bressane. He enjoyed an outstanding debut season in France, making 27 appearances and scoring three tries, which secured him a move to Top 14 powerhouse ASM Clermont on a two-year contract, with an option for a third season.

Initially recruited as Clermont's third-choice hooker behind Benjamin Kayser and Ti'i Paulo, he quickly surpassed expectations, overtaking Paulo in the pecking order through his powerful ball carrying, uncompromising defence, and physical presence. During his first season, he featured in the European Rugby Champions Cup (ERCC) knockout stages before establishing himself as a regular starter during Clermont's Top 14 finals campaign. Over six seasons with the club, he became a key member of the squad and played an important role in their 2016–17 Top 14 championship-winning season.

At the conclusion of the 2019–20 campaign, Clermont opted not to renew his contract, citing his age (34) and experienced status. He subsequently signed a two-year deal with Bayonne. Following one season in the Top 14, Bayonne were relegated to Pro D2 for the 2021–22 season. Upon the expiry of his contract in June 2022, he retired from professional rugby.

After returning to Australia, Ulugia rejoined the Brumbies as short-term injury cover after impressing coach Stephen Larkham in the John I Dent Cup with the Tuggeranong Vikings. He accepted the offer and made an unexpected return in the opening round of the 2023 season against the Waratahs. Originally named on the bench after a late team change, he entered the match in the fifth minute following an injury to Connal McInerney. He made two appearances during the season before retiring.

== Coaching career ==
Following his final playing stint, Ulugia remained with the Brumbies, taking up the role of forwards coach in the Academy and Pathways program in 2023. By the end of 2023, Ulugia became the Brumbies' scrum coach, joining the senior ranks alongside former Brumby Ben Mowen.

In late 2025, following the departure of Mike Cron from the Australia national team setup, Ulugia was appointed the teams scrum coach for their Spring tour. In June 2026, Ulugia extended his contract to 2028.
