= Digby Ioane =

Australian rugby union player

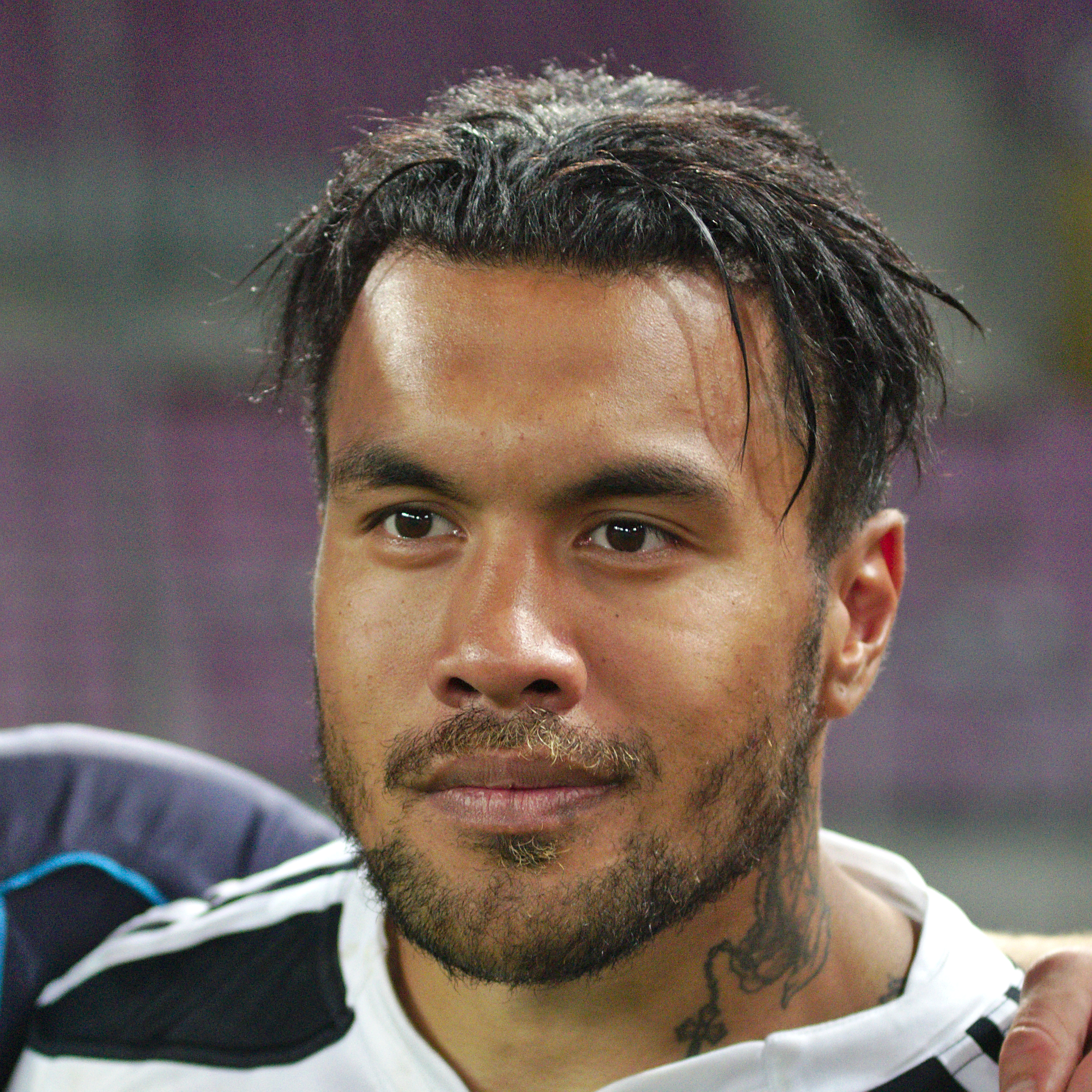
- Born: Digby Anthony Natu Ioane; 14 July 1985 (age 41) Wellington, New Zealand
- Height: 179 cm (5 ft 10 in)
- Weight: 93 kg (14 st 9 lb)
- School: St. Joseph's College, Gregory Terrace; St John's, Dandenong
- Notable relatives: Ole Avei (nephew); Monty Ioane (nephew); John Ulugia (cousin)

Rugby union career
- Position: Centre / Wing
Senior career
| Years | Team | Apps | (Points) |
| 2007 | Melbourne | 8 | (5) |
| 2013–2015 | Stade Français | 25 | (25) |
| 2015−2017 | Honda Heat | 31 | (20) |
| 2017–2019 | Panasonic Wild Knights | 8 | (25) |
| 2020 | Colorado Raptors | 0 | (0) |
- Correct as of 30 December 2020
Super Rugby
| Years | Team | Apps | (Points) |
| 2006–2007 | Force | 20 | (20) |
| 2008–2013 | Reds | 66 | (90) |
| 2017 | Crusaders | 3 | (5) |
- Correct as of 30 December 2020
International career
| Years | Team | Apps | (Points) |
| 2007–2013 | Australia | 35 | (55) |
| 2005–2008 | Australia A | 5 | (15) |
| 2005–2007 | Australia U21 | 5 | (10) |
| 2004 | Australia U19 | | |
| 2002–2003 | Australian Schoolboys | | |
- Correct as of 30 December 2020
Medal record
Men's rugby union
Representing Australia
Rugby World Cup
| Bronze medal – third place | 2011 New Zealand | Squad |

Digby Ioane (born 14 July 1985) is an Australian former professional rugby union footballer who last played for the Colorado Raptors in Major League Rugby (MLR). Ioane previously played for Panasonic Wild Knights in the Top League in Japan. He also played for Stade Français, the Western Force, the Queensland Reds and the Crusaders, and international representative Test rugby for the Australia national team.

== Family and early life ==
Ioane was born in Wellington, New Zealand, but moved to Melbourne with his family when he was 2 years old. His family, including cousin and fellow rugby player John Ulugia, are of Samoan heritage. He was introduced to rugby league then to rugby union at an early age and represented Victoria in both junior Victorian Rugby Union and junior Victorian Rugby League before moving to Brisbane in 2002.

Ioane attended St. Joseph's College, Gregory Terrace, and played for the 1st XV rugby team for two years. He played for the Australian Schoolboys team in 2002 and 2003. Ioane joined the Queensland Reds academy in 2004. He was selected for both the Australian U19 and Australian U21 teams in 2004, and made the Australian U21 team again in 2005.

== Rugby career ==
Despite not having played Super Rugby, Ioane was selected for the Wallabies squad to tour France and the United Kingdom under coach Eddie Jones at the end of 2005. He played for Australia 'A' in their win against the French Barbarians in Bordeaux on that tour.

=== Force and Wallabies 2006–07 ===
In 2006, Ioane joined the Western Force, along with Nathan Sharpe from the Reds, who was the Force's first big-name signing and inaugural captain.

Ioane made his Super Rugby debut in the first game of the season for the Force against the Brumbies on 10 February 2006. He played 12 games in his first season and scored 2 tries, but the Force finished in last place in their first year.

After the Super 14 season, Ioane was selected again for Australia 'A', and played in two matches against the visiting Fiji team.

He was selected for a third year in the Australian U21 team, making it to the semi-finals of the 2006 World Championships in France. Ioane was nominated for the International Rugby Board's U21 International Player of the Year award in 2006.

In 2007, the Western Force was bolstered with new signings, including Matt Giteau. Ioane suffered niggling injuries that limited his involvement to 8 games, and he lost his place in the starting 15. However, on 3 June 2007, he was selected to make his Test debut for Australia against Wales at Suncorp Stadium in Brisbane. He made a try saving tackle and scored a try. Ioane spent the latter part of the 2007 season playing for his previous hometown Melbourne Rebels in the Australian Rugby Championship. The Rebels were the surprise packet of the series and were only defeated in the final by the Central Coast Rays.

=== Reds and Wallabies 2008–13 ===
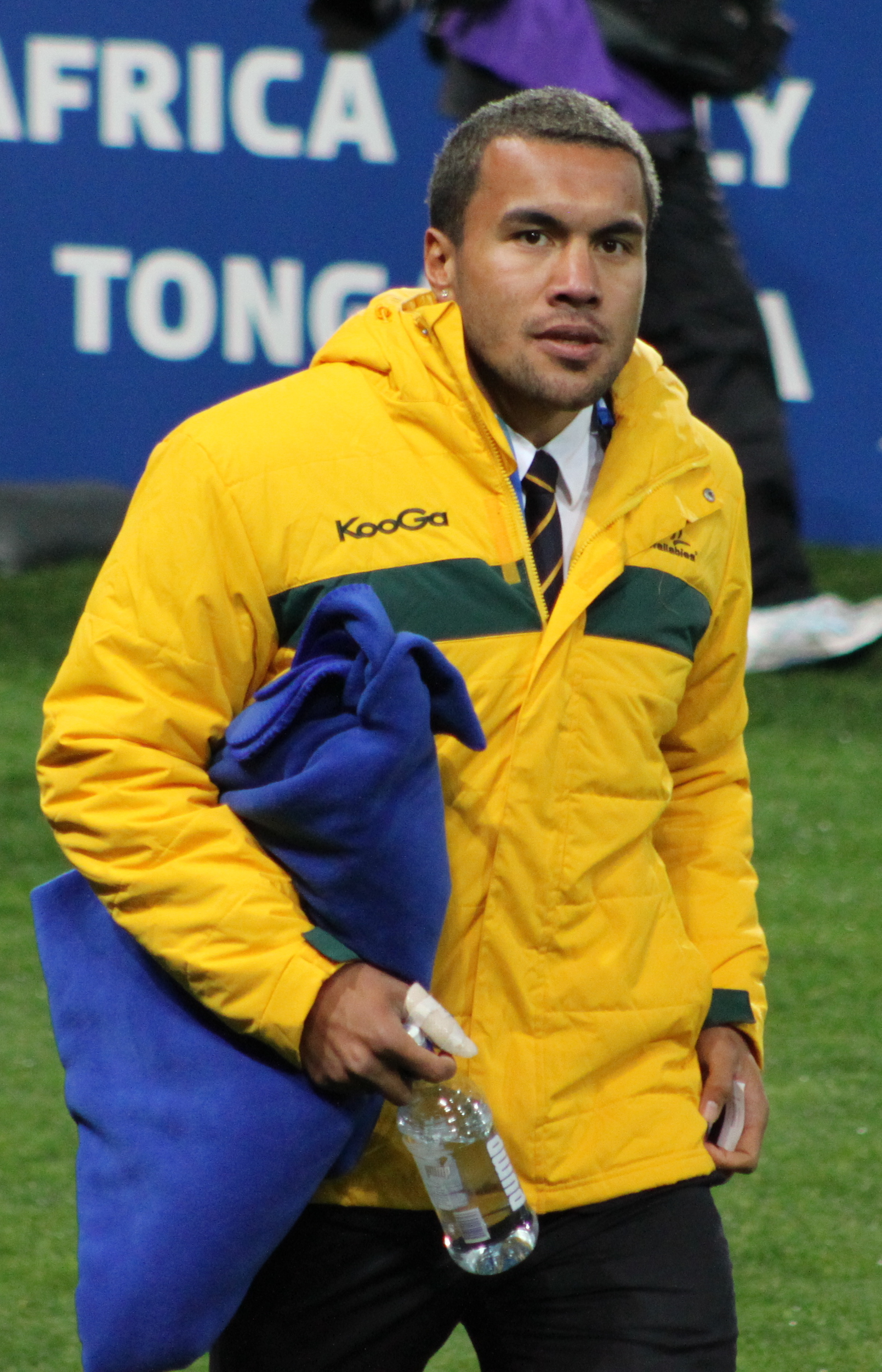
Ioane with the Wallabies in 2011.

Digby Ioane joined the Queensland Reds in 2008. Unfortunately his season was disrupted by a broken hand and two periods of suspension for careless tackles, but his talent still earned him a place in the Wallaby squad and game time with Australia A in the IRB Pacific Nations Cup. He also won a spot on the end of season 2008 tour to the northern hemisphere.

In 2009, Ioane was switched to outside centre to cover an injury and proved a sensation, making the position his own until a shoulder reconstruction ended his season prematurely. Fought his way back to be selected for the Wallaby end of year tour and made his comeback in the Bledisloe Cup Test against the All Blacks in Tokyo.

Ioane continued his good form for the Reds in 2010, playing on the wing and at outside centre. He scored an equal team-high five tries in twelve appearances for the Reds.

2011 was a standout season for Ioane. He featured in 15 Super Rugby games for the Reds and scored five tries, bringing his career Super Rugby tally to 100 points – and earning his selection in the Wallabies' 2011 Tri-Nations and World Cup squads.

Ioane was suspended for 4 matches in 2012 while playing for the Reds, after making an illegal tackle on Sharks Flanker Marcell Coetzee. As the international break approached, Brendan Moon acclaimed Ioane as having the potential to "become one of the greats of the international game". Ioane played an integral role in Australia's 3-0 Test series win over Wales in June 2012, and scored the vital match-winning try against Argentina in The 2012 Rugby Championship.

In 2013, Ioane added a further ten Super Rugby caps for the Reds. He played in the first Test against the touring British and Irish Lions on 22 June 2013, which Australia lost 21–23, but sustained a labral tear injury to his right shoulder in the match and was ruled out of playing for the rest of the Test series.

=== Stade Français 2013–15 ===
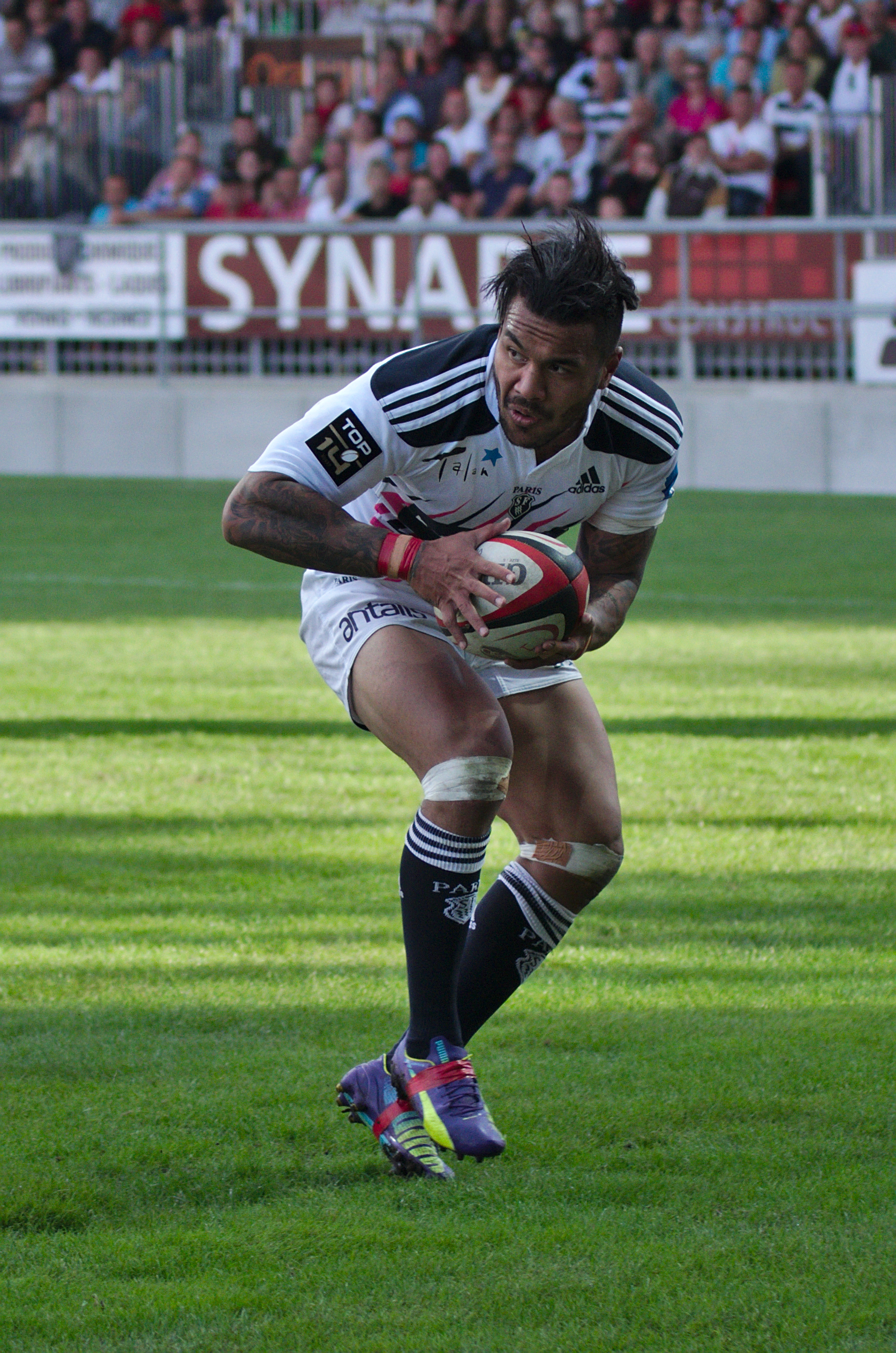
Ioane playing for Stade Français in 2014.

Ioane moved to Europe at the end of 2013 on a two-season contract to play for Stade Français in the Top 14 French domestic competition. He played his first match for the club on 29 December 2013, in a 19–12 win over USA Perpignan.

=== Honda Heat 2015–2017 ===
Moving to Japan, Ioane joined the Honda Heat for the 2015–16 Top League season.

=== Crusaders 2017 ===
In July 2016, Ioane signed a 2-year contract with the Crusaders Super Rugby team starting from 2017 through to 2018.

Ioane was named in the Crusaders' Squad for the Inaugural Brisbane Global Rugby Tens tournament. Playing for the New Zealand-franchise club in the pool-game clash; he scoring a try against his former team: the Reds, guiding the Crusaders to the grand final (which however, they lost to the Chiefs).

Ioane was a member of the Crusaders' successful Super Rugby campaign. Returning to Australia and making his Super Rugby debut for the Kiwi-club in Round 3 and playing against his good friend Quade Cooper and his former team: the Reds, Ioane producing an outstanding performance in the Crusaders' tight 22–20 win (with teammate Mitchell Hunt kicking a penalty goal in the 80th minute to win the game) at Suncorp Stadium. Two weeks later, he scored his first try for the Kiwi-club during the home-game 45–17 win over the Western Force at AMI Stadium. He returned to Australia again, this time in Sydney and featured in the 41–22 win over the Waratahs at Allianz Stadium.

With injuries hampering his time with the Kiwi-club during the 2017 Season and despite contracted for the 2018 Season; Ioane ended his stint with the Kiwi-franchise club, after opting to return to Japan to continue playing full-time rugby with the Panasonic Wild Knights for the 2017–18 Top League season.

=== Panasonic Wild Knights 2017–2018 ===
Ioane (along with his former Wallabies teammate Berrick Barnes) was part of the Panasonic Wild Knights' squad for the 2018 Brisbane Global Rugby Tens tournament.

== Criminal charges over death threat allegations ==
In May 2026, Ioane appeared in the Brisbane Magistrates Court charged with one count of making threats and one count of unlawful stalking, intimidation or harassment involving threats of violence. Queensland Police alleged that he had repeatedly threatened to kill a man on multiple occasions between 22 and 26 April 2026, in connection with a disputed land deal in Samoa.

Representing himself via video link from jail, Ioane applied for bail. He told the court that the complainant was involved in what Digby claimed as a "massive deal" concerning the Samoan Prime Minister and the Israeli army, and said he was acting to protect his mother's land, describing her as the "rightful queen of Samoa". Magistrate Anne Thacker refused bail, saying the evidence appeared too serious to justify release and citing a risk of reoffending, and she raised concerns about Ioane's mental health.

Ioane's older brother attended court in support and told the magistrate that he had sought a mental health assessment for Digby, particularly in relation to head knocks sustained during his rugby career, and insisted his brother was not a violent person. The court heard that Ioane had recently been hospitalised and subsequently discharged, and that he had a prior criminal history. The case was adjourned to 8 June 2026.

== Personal life ==
Digby Ioane is of Samoan descent and is a devout Roman Catholic. He has several tattoos, the vast majority drawing inspiration either from his family or his faith. Ioane is the uncle of Ole Avei, who plays for the Samoan national team, and Monty Ioane, who plays for the Italian national team.

Ioane's departure from the Queensland Reds also drew his nephew, winger Monty Ioane, away from Australian rugby. Then 18 and in the Reds academy, Monty followed his uncle to Stade Français in 2013, later saying he "almost didn't have a say" in the move. He went on to represent Italy, playing on the wing against the Wallabies, Digby's former Test side, in Florence in November 2022.
