= Renaud van Neel =

Namibia international rugby union player

- Full name: Renaud Ewaldt van Neel
- Born: 23 May 1988 (age 38) Windhoek, Namibia
- Height: 1.88 m (6 ft 2 in)
- Weight: 88 kg (194 lb)
- University: University of Namibia

Rugby union career
- Position(s): Lock, Flanker
International career
Years	Team	Apps	(Points)
2011-2012	Namibia	3	(0)
- Correct as of 9 September 2019

Renaud Ewaldt van Neel (born 23 May 1988) is a former Namibian rugby union player who played as a lock represented Namibia internationally from 2011 to 2012 and played for the University of Namibia where he also finished his graduation.

Renaud van Neel was included as an uncapped player in the Namibian squad for the 2011 Rugby World Cup. He made his World Cup debut in a group stage match against Samoa on 14 September 2011, which was also his only World Cup match appearance.
