= Ole Avei =

Samoa international rugby union player

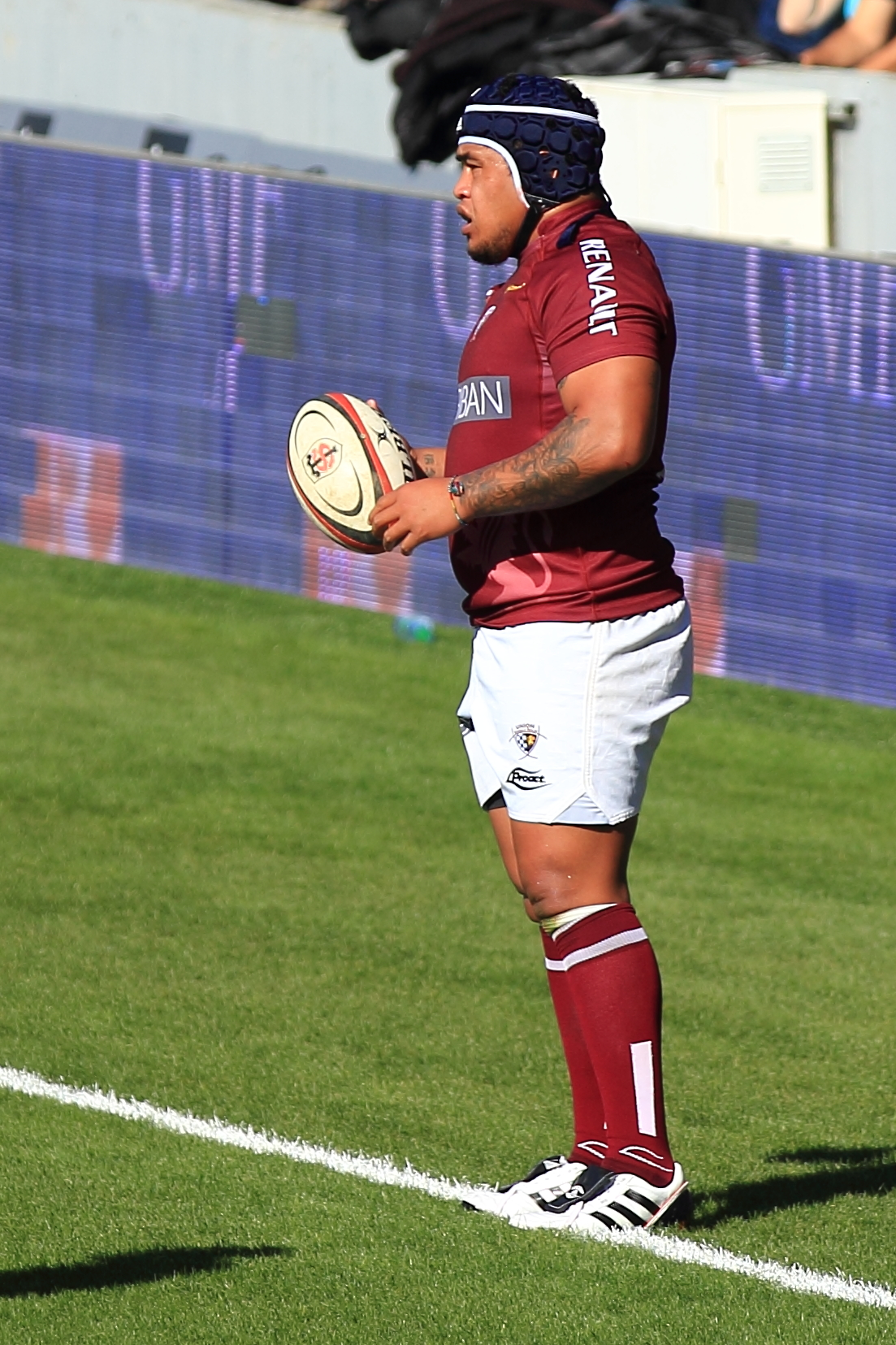
- Born: Wayne Ole Avei; 13 June 1983 (age 43) Wellington, New Zealand
- Height: 1.78 m (5 ft 10 in)
- Weight: 114 kg (17 st 13 lb; 251 lb)
- School: The Southport School
- Notable relative: Digby Ioane (uncle)

Rugby union career
- Position: Hooker
Amateur team(s)
Years	Team	Apps	(Points)
2008-2010	Sunnybank		
Senior career
Years	Team	Apps	(Points)
2010−Nov 2017	Bordeaux-Bègles	171	(135)
Dec 2017-2019	Racing 92	29	(10)
2019-2023	Soyaux-Angouleme	17	(5)
- Correct as of 12 August 2015
Provincial / State sides
Years	Team	Apps	(Points)
2007	East Coast Aces	3	(5)
2008-09	Waikato	14	(5)
Super Rugby
Years	Team	Apps	(Points)
2006-08	Reds	2	(0)
2009	Chiefs	0	(0)
- Correct as of 13 July 2014
International career
Years	Team	Apps	(Points)
2004	Australia U21		
2011–2015	Samoa	34	(0)
- Correct as of 3 October 2015

Ole Avei (born 13 June 1983 in Wellington, New Zealand) is a retired Samoan International Rugby Union player, who most recently played hooker with Soyaux-Angouleme in the French Pro D2.

Avei began his professional career in 2005 with the Queensland Reds, making his first Super 14 debut in 2006, against the Chiefs in Hamilton. He then went on to play for Waikato in the Air New Zealand Cup in 2008, and in 2010, he signed in France with the Union Bordeaux Bègles for 2 years, extending his contract for a rare 5-year deal over offers from several top clubs, including current champions Stade Toulousain (Toulouse).

Avei made his International debut for Samoa in the 2011 Pacific Nations Cup, in the match against Japan on 2 July 2011. He was then selected to represent Samoa in the 2011 Rugby World Cup in New Zealand and the 2015 Rugby World Cup.

== Clubs ==
- 2005–08: Queensland Reds (Super 14)
- 2008–10: Waikato (NPC), Chiefs (WTG)
- 2010- Nov 2017: Union Bordeaux Begles (Pro D2 and Top 14)
- Dec 2017- 2019: Racing 92 (Top 14)
- 2019-2023 : Soyaux Angoulême XV Charente (Pro D2)
