= 2011 Churchill Cup =

Ninth and final edition of international rugby union tournament

Tournament information
- Date: 4 June – 18 June 2011
- Venue(s): Sixways Stadium, Worcester, England
- Teams: 6

Final positions
- Champion: England Saxons (6th title)
- Runner-up: Canada

Tournament statistics
- Matches played: 9

The 2011 Churchill Cup, the ninth and final edition of an annual international rugby union tournament, took place in Northampton, Esher, Gloucester and Worcester. This was just the second time in the tournament's history in which England played host.

== Competitors ==
The three regular participants in the event — the senior national sides of the United States and Canada, and England's "A" (second-level) national side, the England Saxons, were joined by second year participants Russia and two first-time competitors: Italy A and Tonga. England Saxons fielded a young team. At the same time, Italy A picked an experienced side, with many of the regulars for the main national team.

== Format ==
The teams played in a round-robin format between two pools to decide the elimination matches. All six teams participate on the finals day: the two pool winners will compete in the Cup Final, the two runners-up will play in a Plate Final, and the two bottom-placed teams will meet in the Bowl Final.

== Venues ==
The pool rounds were played at Franklin's Gardens in Northampton, Molesey Road in Esher, and Kingsholm Stadium in Gloucester. The finals were played at Sixways Stadium in Worcester.

== Fixtures and results ==
=== Pool stage ===
==== Pool A ====
Place	Nation	Games				Points			Bonus points	Table points
Place	Nation	Played	Won	Drawn	Lost	For	Against	Difference	Bonus points	Table points
1	England A	2	2	0	0	128	22	+106	2	10
2	Tonga	2	1	0	1	58	54	+4	1	5
3	United States	2	0	0	2	21	131	−110	0	0

4 June 2011
17:00 WEST/GMT+01 (UTC+01)

England Saxons	87–8	United States
Try: Benjamin (3) 4' c, 10' m, 57' c Brown (2) 6' c, 42' m Young 24' c Penalty try 40' c Johnson 49' c Twelvetrees 52' c Trinder 60' c Sharples 67' c Kitchener 71' c Hodgson 73' c Con: Clegg (11/13)	Report	Try: LaValla 78' m Pen: Enosa 3'

Franklin's Gardens, Northampton
Referee: Nigel Owens (Wales)

FB	15	Mike Brown	(substituted off) 50'
RW	14	Topsy Ojo	(substituted off) 50'
OC	13	Henry Trinder
IC	12	Billy Twelvetrees
LW	11	Miles Benjamin
FH	10	Rory Clegg
SH	9	Micky Young	(substituted off) 65'
N8	8	Jordan Crane (c)
OF	7	Tom Johnson
BF	6	James Gaskell	(substituted off) 14'
RL	5	Dave Attwood
LL	4	Mouritz Botha	(substituted off) 58'
TP	3	Matt Stevens	37' to 40'
HK	2	Joe Gray	(substituted off) 52'
LP	1	Matt Mullan			(substituted off) 58'
Substitutes:
HK	16	David Paice	(substituted on) 52'
PR	17	Kieran Brookes	(substituted on) 37'	(substituted off) 40'	(substituted on) 58'
LK	18	Graham Kitchener	(substituted on) 58'
FL	19	Jamie Gibson	(substituted on) 14'
SH	20	Paul Hodgson	(substituted on) 65'
FB	21	Alex Goode	(substituted on) 50'
WG	22	Charlie Sharples	(substituted on) 50'
Coach:
(England) Stuart Lancaster

FB	15	Mike Palefau
RW	14	Mile Pulu	(substituted off) 52'
OC	13	Tai Enosa
IC	12	Junior Sifa	(substituted off) 77'
LW	11	Colin Hawley
FH	10	Troy Hall
SH	9	Mike Petri (c)	(substituted off) 70'
N8	8	JJ Gagiano	(substituted off) 62'
OF	7	Danny LaPrevotte	(substituted off) 52'
BF	6	Pat Danahy
RL	5	Scott LaValla
LL	4	John van der Giessen
TP	3	Will Johnson
HK	2	Phil Thiel	(substituted off) 47'
LP	1	Eric Fry	(substituted off) 47'
Substitutes:
HK	16	Chris Biller	(substituted on) 47'
PR	17	Shawn Pittman	(substituted on) 47'
LK	18	Louis Stanfill	(substituted on) 52'
N8	19	Inaki Basauri	(substituted on) 62'
SH	20	Tim Usasz	(substituted on) 70'
CE	21	Roland Suniula	(substituted on) 52'
CE	22	Andrew Suniula	(substituted on) 77'
Coach:
(Ireland) Eddie O'Sullivan

Touch judges:
Llyr ApGeraint-Roberts
Andrew Watson
Television match official:
David Matthews

- This was the highest margin of win of any England national team over the United States.

8 June 2011
17:30 WEST/GMT+01 (UTC+01)

Tonga	44–13	United States
Try: Iongi (4) 10' c, 48' c, 58' c, 75' c Mapakaitolo 80' c Con: K. Morath (5/5); Pen: K. Morath (3) 2', 21', 48'	Report	Try: Emerick 33' c Con: Malifa (1/1); Pen: Malifa (2) 15', 65'

Molesey Road, Esher
Referee: Romain Poite (France)

FB	15	Mateo Malupo
RW	14	Viliami Helu
OC	13	Suka Hufanga	(substituted off) 68'
IC	12	Etueni Siua	(substituted off) 71'
LW	11	Viliame Iongi
FH	10	Kurt Morath
SH	9	Soane Havea	(substituted off) 61'
N8	8	Vili Maʻafu	(substituted off) 52'
OF	7	Pepa Koloamatangi	(substituted off) 29'	(substituted on) 39'
BF	6	Pasuka Mapakaitolo
RL	5	Emosi Kauhenga	(substituted off) 56'
LL	4	Sione Timani
TP	3	Kisi Pulu (c)			(substituted off) 66'
HK	2	Ilaisa Maʻasi	(substituted off) 75'
LP	1	Tonga Leaʻaetoa	(yellow card) 27' to 39'
Substitutes:
HK	16	Atonio Halangahu	(substituted on) 75'
PR	17	Taʻu Faingaʻanuku	(substituted on) 29'	(substituted off) 39'	(substituted on) 66'
LK	18	Josh Afu	(substituted off) 56'
N8	19	Paula Kaho	(substituted on) 52'
SH	20	Daniel Morath	(substituted on) 61'
FH	21	Eddie Paea	(substituted on) 68'
CE	22	Silivenusi Taumoepeau	(substituted on) 71'
Coach:
(New Zealand) Isitolo Maka

FB	15	Roland Suniula
RW	14	Colin Hawley
OC	13	Paul Emerick	66' to 67'		(substituted off) 75'
IC	12	Andrew Suniula
LW	11	Kevin Swiryn
FH	10	Nese Malifa	(substituted off) 75'
SH	9	Tim Usasz	(substituted off) 71'
N8	8	Nic Johnson
OF	7	Todd Clever (c)
BF	6	Inaki Basauri	(substituted off) 50'	(substituted on) 57'	(substituted off) 66'
RL	5	Scott LaValla
LL	4	Louis Stanfill	(substituted off) 75'
TP	3	Shawn Pittman	(yellow card) 47' to 57'
HK	2	Chris Biller	(substituted off) 47'
LP	1	Mate Moeakiola			(substituted off) 69'
Substitutes:
HK	16	Phil Thiel	(substituted on) 47'
PR	17	Eric Fry	(substituted on) 50'	(substituted off) 57'	(substituted on) 69'
LK	18	John van der Giessen			(substituted on) 66'
FL	19	Pat Danahy	(substituted on) 75'
SH	20	Mike Petri	(substituted on) 71'
CE	21	Tai Enosa	(substituted on) 66'	(substituted off) 67'	(substituted on) 75'
CE	22	Troy Hall	(substituted on) 75'
Coach:
(Ireland) Eddie O'Sullivan

Touch judges:
Luke Pearce
Stuart Terheege
Television match official:
Geoff Warren

12 June 2011
14:30 WEST/GMT+01 (UTC+01)

England Saxons	41–14	Tonga
Try: Penalty try (3) 10' c, 32' c, 63' c Crane 15' c Twelvetrees 71' c Con: Clegg (5/5); Pen: Clegg (2) 40', 46'	Report	Try: Timani 49' c Koloamatangi 77' c Con: K. Morath (2/2)

Kingsholm Stadium, Gloucester
Referee: Romain Poite (France)

FB	15	Alex Goode	(substituted off) 55'
RW	14	Charlie Sharples
OC	13	Henry Trinder	(substituted off) 59'
IC	12	Billy Twelvetrees
LW	11	Topsy Ojo
FH	10	Rory Clegg
SH	9	Paul Hodgson	(substituted off) 65'
N8	8	Jordan Crane (c)
OF	7	Tom Johnson	(substituted off) 73'
BF	6	James Gaskell	(substituted off) 69'
RL	5	Dave Attwood
LL	4	Mouritz Botha
TP	3	Matt Stevens
HK	2	David Paice	(substituted off) 55'
LP	1	Matt Mullan	(substituted off) 65'
Substitutes:
HK	16	Joe Gray	(substituted on) 55'
PR	17	Kieran Brookes	(substituted on) 65'
LK	18	Graham Kitchener	(substituted on) 69'
FL	19	Jamie Gibson	(substituted on) 73'
SH	20	Micky Young	(substituted on) 65'
CE	21	Jordan Turner-Hall	(substituted on) 59'
FB	22	Mike Brown	(substituted on) 55'
Coach:
(England) Stuart Lancaster

FB	15	Eddie Paea
RW	14	Viliami Helu
OC	13	Suka Hufanga
IC	12	Sione Fonua	(substituted off) 40'
LW	11	Viliame Iongi
FH	10	Kurt Morath
SH	9	Daniel Morath	(substituted off) 55'
N8	8	Pasuka Mapakaitolo		(substituted off) 61'
OF	7	Pepa Koloamatangi
BF	6	Josh Afu
RL	5	Emosi Kauhenga	(substituted off) 47'
LL	4	Sione Timani	(substituted off) 65'
TP	3	Kisi Pulu (c)
HK	2	Semisi Telefoni	(substituted off) 58'
LP	1	Tonga Leaʻaetoa	(substituted off) 55'	(substituted on) 61'
Substitutes:
HK	16	Atonio Halangahu	(substituted on) 58'
PR	17	Taʻu Faingaʻanuku	(substituted on) 55'	(yellow card) 61' to 71'
LK	18	Kele Hehea	(substituted on) 47'
FL	19	Tevita Ula	(substituted on) 65'
SH	20	Soane Havea	(substituted on) 55'
FH	21	Mateo Malupo
CE	22	Silivenusi Taumoepeau	(substituted on) 40'
Coach:
(New Zealand) Isitolo Maka

==== Pool B ====
Place	Nation	Games				Points			Bonus points	Table points
Place	Nation	Played	Won	Drawn	Lost	For	Against	Difference	Bonus points	Table points
1	Canada	2	2	0	0	60	30	+30	1	9
2	Italy A	2	1	0	1	36	45	−9	0	4
3	Russia	2	0	0	2	37	58	−21	1	1

4 June 2011
14:30 WEST/GMT+01 (UTC+01)

Italy A	12–26	Canada
Pen: Tebaldi (4) 15', 32', 35', 63'	Report	Try: Carpenter 44' m Marshall 46' m Pritchard 56' c Con: Pritchard (1/3); Pen: Pritchard (2) 8', 70'; Drop: Monro 29'

Franklin's Gardens, Northampton
Referee: Dave Pearson (England)

FB	15	Ruggero Trevisan	(substituted off) 68'
RW	14	Andrea Bacchetti
OC	13	Denis Majstorovic
IC	12	Matteo Pratichetti
LW	11	Michele Sepe
FH	10	Riccardo Bocchino
SH	9	Tito Tebaldi	(substituted off) 71'
N8	8	Manoa Vosawai
OF	7	Mauro Bergamasco
BF	6	Valerio Bernabò (c)	(yellow card) 42' to 52'
RL	5	Marco Bortolami	(substituted off) 53'
LL	4	Corniel van Zyl	(substituted off) 62'
TP	3	Fabio Staibano	(substituted off) 50'
HK	2	Tommaso D'Apice	(substituted off) 71'
LP	1	Alberto De Marchi	(substituted off) 45'
Substitutes:
HK	16	Andrea Manici	(substituted on) 71'
PR	17	Matías Agüero	(substituted on) 45'
PR	18	Dario Chistolini	(substituted on) 50'
LK	19	Joshua Furno	(substituted on) 53'
SH	20	Giulio Toniolatti	(substituted on) 71'
FB	21	DuRandt Gerber	(substituted on) 68'
LK	22	Francesco Minto	(substituted on) 62'
Coach:
(Italy) Gianluca Guidi

FB	15	James Pritchard
RW	14	Ciaran Hearn
OC	13	Conor Trainor
IC	12	Ryan Smith
LW	11	Phil Mackenzie
FH	10	Ander Monro
SH	9	Ed Fairhurst
N8	8	Aaron Carpenter			(substituted off) 71'
OF	7	Chauncey O'Toole
BF	6	Jebb Sinclair	18' to 24'
RL	5	Brian Erichsen
LL	4	Tyler Hotson
TP	3	Jason Marshall
HK	2	Pat Riordan (c)
LP	1	Hubert Buydens	(substituted off) 65'
Substitutes:
HK	16	Ryan Hamilton
PR	17	Andrew Tiedemann	(substituted on) 65'
LK	18	Mitch Gudgeon
FL	19	Nanyak Dala	(substituted on) 18'	(substituted off) 24'	(substituted on) 71'
SH	20	Sean White
CE	21	Mike Scholz
FB	22	Matt Evans
Coach:
(New Zealand) Kieran Crowley

Touch judges:
Andrew Small
Ian Tempest
Television match official:
David Matthews

8 June 2011
20:00 WEST/GMT+01 (UTC+01)

Canada	34–18	Russia
Try: Mensah-Coker 12' c Trainor 35' m Monro 61' c O'Toole 70' m Evans 77' c Con: Pritchard (3/5); Pen: Pritchard 17'	Report	Try: Klyuchnikov 20' c Artemiev 26' m Con: Kushnarev (1/2); Pen: Kushnarev (2) 15', 40'

Molesey Road, Esher
Attendance: 2,100
Referee: Nigel Owens (Wales)

FB	15	James Pritchard
RW	14	Matt Evans
OC	13	Conor Trainor	(substituted off) 60'
IC	12	Mike Scholz
LW	11	Justin Mensah-Coker
FH	10	Ander Monro (c)
SH	9	Sean White	(substituted off) 55'
N8	8	Aaron Carpenter
OF	7	Chauncey O'Toole
BF	6	Jebb Sinclair	(substituted off) 66'
RL	5	Jamie Cudmore	(substituted off) 74'
LL	4	Tyler Hotson
TP	3	Scott Franklin	(substituted off) 67'
HK	2	Ryan Hamilton	(substituted off) 24'
LP	1	Tom Dolezel	(substituted off) 55'
Substitutes:
HK	16	Pat Riordan	(substituted on) 24'
PR	17	Andrew Tiedemann	(substituted on) 67'
PR	18	Hubert Buydens	(substituted on) 55'
LK	19	Mitch Gudgeon	(substituted on) 74'
FL	20	Nanyak Dala	(substituted on) 66'
SH	21	Ed Fairhurst	(substituted on) 55'
CE	22	Phil Mackenzie	(substituted on) 60'
Coach:
(New Zealand) Kieran Crowley

FB	15	Igor Klyuchnikov
RW	14	Vasily Artemiev
OC	13	Igor Galinovskiy	(substituted off) 53'
IC	12	Alexey Makovetskiy
LW	11	Vladimir Ostroushko
FH	10	Yuri Kushnarev
SH	9	Alexandr Shakirov	(substituted off) 76'
N8	8	Viacheslav Grachev	(substituted off) 53'
OF	7	Andrey Garbuzov
BF	6	Andrey Temnov
RL	5	Alexander Voytov
LL	4	Vladimir Boltenkov	(substituted off) 64'
TP	3	Ivan Prischepenko	(substituted off) 57'
HK	2	Vladislav Korshunov (c)	(substituted off) 74'
LP	1	Sergei Popov
Substitutes:
HK	16	Valery Tsnobiladze	(substituted on) 74'
PR	17	Alexey Travkin	(substituted on) 57'
LK	18	Alexey Panasenko	(substituted on) 64'
N8	19	Victor Gresev	(substituted on) 53'
SH	20	Andrei Bykanov	(substituted on) 76'
CE	21	Sergey Trishin	(substituted on) 53'
FH	22	Anton Ryabov
Coach:
(Wales) Kingsley Jones

Touch judges:
David Rose
Roy Maybank
Television match official:
Geoff Warren

12 June 2011
17:00 WEST/GMT+01 (UTC+01)

Italy A	24–19	Russia
Try: Pratichetti 5' c Toniolatti 23' m Con: Tebaldi (1/2) 5'; Pen: Tebaldi (3) 19', 32', 51'; Bocchino 60'	Report	Try: Yagudin 54' c Con: Kushnarev (1/1) 54'; Pen: Kushnarev (4) 22', 28', 43', 57'

Kingsholm Stadium, Gloucester
Attendance: 5,357
Referee: Dave Pearson (England)

FB	15	Ruggero Trevisan
RW	14	Giulio Toniolatti
OC	13	Andrea Pratichetti
IC	12	Matteo Pratichetti
LW	11	Michele Sepe
FH	10	Riccardo Bocchino
SH	9	Tito Tebaldi (yellow card)
N8	8	Manoa Vosawai
OF	7	Mauro Bergamasco
BF	6	Francesco Minto
RL	5	Valerio Bernabò (c)
LL	4	Joshua Furno
TP	3	Fabio Staibano
HK	2	Tommaso D'Apice
LP	1	Alberto De Marchi
Substitutes:
	16	Andrea Mancini
	17	Matías Agüero
	18	Dario Chistolini
	19	Marco Bortolami
	20	DuRandt Gerber
	21	Giovanbattista Venditti
	22	Nicola Belardo
Coach:
(Italy) Gianluca Guidi

FB	15	Igor Klyuchnikov
RW	14	Vasily Artemiev
OC	13	Mikhail Babaev
IC	12	Sergey Trishin
LW	11	Rushan Yagudin
FH	10	Yuri Kushnarev
SH	9	Andrey Bykanov
N8	8	Viacheslav Grachev (c)
OF	7	Mikhail Sidorov
BF	6	Victor Gresev
RL	5	Denis Antonov
LL	4	Alexey Panasenko
TP	3	Alexey Chernyshov
HK	2	Valery Tsnobiladze
LP	1	Grigory Tsnobiladze
Substitutes:
	16	Vladislav Korshunov
	17	Alexey Travkin
	18	Ivan Prischepenko
	19	Andrey Garbuzov
	20	Alexander Shakirov
	21	Anton Ryabov
	22	Igor Galinovskiy
Coach:
(Wales) Kingsley Jones

=== Finals ===
==== Bowl final ====
18 June 2011
12:00 WEST/GMT+01 (UTC+01)

United States	32–25	Russia
Try: Emerick 23' m A. Suniula 57' c Clever 60' c Enosa 71' c Con: Malifa (3/4) 58', 61', 72'; Pen: Malifa (2) 5', 49'	Report	Try: Ostroushko 30' m Voytov 51' c Artemiev 64' c Con: Kushnarev (2/3) 51', 64'; Pen: Kushnarev (2) 1', 47'

Sixways Stadium, Worcester
Referee: Dave Pearson (England)

==== Plate final ====
18 June 2011
14:15 WEST/GMT+01 (UTC+01)

Tonga	18–27	Italy A
Try: Iongi 54' m Malupo 80' c Con: K. Morath (1/2) 80'; Pen: Paea 12'; K. Morath 68'	Report	Try: Bocchino 3' c A. Pratichetti 50' c Venditti 73' c Con: Tebaldi (3/3) 3', 50', 73'; Pen: Tebaldi (2) 19', 42'

Sixways Stadium, Worcester
Referee: Nigel Owens (Wales)

==== Cup final ====
18 June 2011
16:30 WEST/GMT+01 (UTC+01)

England Saxons	37–6	Canada
Try: Gaskell 21' m Benjamin (2) 23' c, 59' c Sharples 67' m Gibson 75' c Con: Clegg (3/5) 23', 59', 75'; Pen: Clegg (2) 12', 50'	Report	Pen: Pritchard 29'; Drop: Monro 14'

Sixways Stadium, Worcester
Referee: Romain Poite (France)

== See also ==
- Churchill Cup
