= 2010 IRB Pacific Nations Cup =

Tournament details
- Countries: Fiji; Japan; Samoa; Tonga
- Tournament format(s): Round-robin
- Date: 12–26 June 2010

Tournament statistics
- Teams: 4
- Matches played: 6
- Attendance: 0 (0 per match)
- Tries scored: 34 (5.67 per match)
- Top point scorer(s): Kurt Morath (Tonga) (39 points)
- Top try scorer(s): Vunga Lilo (Tonga); Mikaele Pesamino (Samoa) (3 tries)

Final
- Champions: Samoa (1st title)
- Runners-up: Fiji

The 2010 Pacific Nations Cup was a rugby union tournament held between four national sides on the Pacific Rim: Fiji, Japan, Samoa and Tonga. The competition was won by Samoa.

The Junior All Blacks, the defending title holder, decided not to take part in this year's competition. The inaugural competition was held in 2006. This year the tournament began on June 12 and ended on June 26, 2010, with most of the matches hosted by Samoa. All matches except for a match between Fiji and Asian 5 Nations champion, Japan were played at Apia Park in Samoa.

The tournament was a round-robin where each team played all of the other teams once. The standard bonus points system was used to determine the overall winner—four points for a win, two for a draw and none for a defeat, plus single bonus points offered for scoring four or more tries in a match and losing by 7 points or fewer.

== Table ==
2010 IRB Pacific Nations Cup
	Team	Played	Won	Drawn	Lost	Points For	Points Against	Points Difference	Tries For	Tries Against	Try Bonus	Losing Bonus	Points
1	Samoa	3	2	0	1	78	63	+15	11	5	1	0	9
2	Fiji	3	2	0	1	72	77	-5	8	11	1	0	9
3	Japan	3	2	0	1	65	68	-3	6	8	0	0	8
4	Tonga	3	0	0	3	84	91	-7	9	10	1	3	4
Source : irb.com Points breakdown: *4 points for a win *2 points for a draw *1 bonus point for a loss by seven points or less *1 bonus point for scoring four or more tries in a match

== Schedule ==
=== Round 1 ===
12 June 2010
15:10 (UTC-11)

Samoa	24 – 23	Tonga
Try: Poluleuligaga 26' c Penalty try 56' c Pesamino 68' c Con: Lui (3/3) 27', 57', 69'; Pen: P. Williams (1/1) 7'	Report	Try: Lilo 63' c Taufa 77' c Con: K. Morath (2/2) 64', 78'; Pen: K. Morath (3/3) 2', 25', 52'

Apia Park, Apia
Referee: Peter Fitzgibbon (Ireland)

Samoa
FB	15	Paul Williams
RW	14	Mikaele Pesamino
OC	13	George Pisi	(substituted off) 45'
IC	12	Jamie Helleur
LW	11	David Lemi	(substituted off) 74'
FH	10	Lolo Lui
SH	9	Junior Poluleuligaga	(substituted off) 52'
N8	8	George Stowers
OF	7	Falemiga Selesele	(substituted off) 57'
BF	6	Joe Tekori
RL	5	Kane Thompson	(substituted off) 48'
LL	4	Filipo Levi
TP	3	Sakaria Taulafo	(substituted off) 70'
HK	2	Mahonri Schwalger (c)
LP	1	Anthony Perenise
Replacements:
HK	16	Andrew Williams
PR	17	James Afoa	(substituted in) 70'
LK	18	Manaia Salavea	(substituted in) 48'
FL	19	Alafoti Fa'osiliva	(substituted in) 57'
SH	20	Uale Mai	(substituted in) 52'
CE	21	Fautua Otto	(substituted in) 45'
WG	22	Uarotafou Setu	(substituted in) 70'
Coach:
(Samoa) Titimaea Tafua

FB	15	Vunga Lilo
RW	14	Alaska Taufa
OC	13	Saia Fekitoa	(substituted off) 40'
IC	12	Andrew Mailei
LW	11	Manu Ahotaʻeʻiloa
FH	10	Kurt Morath
SH	9	Daniel Morath	(substituted off) 46'
N8	8	Sione Kalamafoni
OF	7	Paula Kata
BF	6	Kelepi Halafihi	(substituted off) 59'
RL	5	Alepini Olosoni	(substituted off) 58'
LL	4	Akameta Feao
TP	3	Poʻaloʻi Taula	(substituted off) 58'
HK	2	Aleki Lutui (c)	(substituted off) 71'
LP	1	Toma Toke
Replacements:
HK	16	Sione Vaiomoʻunga	(substituted in) 71'
PR	17	Sione Fukofuka	(substituted in) 58'
LK	18	Sitiveni Mafi	(substituted in) 58'
FL	19	Atunaisa Sikalu	(substituted in) 59'
SH	20	Samisoni Fisilau	(substituted in) 46'
FH	21	Fangatapu Apikotoa
CE	22	Alipate Fatafehi	(substituted in) 40'
Coach:
(New Zealand) Isitolo Maka

Touch judges:
(Samoa) Tui Komiti
(Samoa) Kelekolio Petelo

12 June 2010
15:10 (UTC+12)

Fiji	22 – 8	Japan
Try: Matawalu 50' c Nagusa 56' c Keresoni 76' m Con: Dakuvula (2/3) 51', 57'; Pen: Dakuvula (1/3) 5'	Report	Try: Kikutani 73' m Con: Nicholas (0/1); Pen: Webb (0/3); Nicholas (1/1) 60'

Churchill Park, Lautoka
Referee: George Clancy (Ireland)

Fiji
FB	15	Jaoji Dakuvula
RW	14	Timoci Nagusa	(substituted off) 65'
OC	13	Ropate Ratu	(substituted off) 69'
IC	12	Iliesa Keresoni
LW	11	Nemani Nadolo
FH	10	Jonetani Ralulu
SH	9	Nikola Matawalu	(substituted off) 67'
N8	8	Kelepi Ketedromo
OF	7	Jim Naikadawa	17' to 28' (substituted off) 40'
BF	6	Rupeni Nasiga	(substituted off) 65'
RL	5	Dominiko Waqaniburotu (c)
LL	4	Sekonaia Kalou
TP	3	Alefoso Yalayalatabua
HK	2	Viliame Veikoso	(substituted off) 57'
LP	1	Campese Ma'afu	(substituted off) 61'
Replacements:
HK	16	Talemaitoga Tuapati	(substituted in) 57'
PR	17	Graham Dewes	(substituted in) 61'
LK	18	Anthony Wise	(substituted in) 65'
FL	19	Samu Bola	(substituted in) 17' (substituted off) 28' (substituted in) 40'
SH	20	Emosi Vucago	(substituted in) 67'
CE	21	Epeli Ruivadra	(substituted in) 69'
WG	22	Malakai Bakaniceva	(substituted in) 65'
Coach:
(Fiji) Sam Domoni

Japan
FB	15	Kaoru Matsushita
RW	14	Alisi Tupuailei
OC	13	Koji Taira	(substituted off) 57'
IC	12	Ryan Nicholas
LW	11	Kosuke Endo
FH	10	Shaun Webb	(substituted off) 61'
SH	9	Fumiaki Tanaka	(substituted off) 74'
N8	8	Takashi Kikutani (c)
OF	7	Touetsu Taufa
BF	6	Michael Leitch	33' to 40' (substituted off) 57'
RL	5	Luke Thompson	30' to 31' (substituted off) 61'
LL	4	Hitoshi Ono
TP	3	Shinsuke Nakamura
HK	2	Shota Horie	(substituted off) 77'
LP	1	Hisateru Hirashima	(substituted off) 61'
Replacements:
HK	16	Hiroki Yuhara	(substituted in) 77'
PR	17	Naoki Kawamata	(substituted in) 61'
LK	18	Toshizumi Kitagawa	(substituted in) 30' (substituted off) 31' (substituted in) 61'
FL	19	Koliniasi Holani	(substituted in) 33' (substituted off) 40' (substituted in) 57'
SH	20	Koji Wada	(substituted in) 74'
FH	21	James Arlidge	(substituted in) 61'
CE	22	Hirotoki Onozawa	(substituted in) 57'
Coach:
(New Zealand) John Kirwan

Touch judges:
(Fiji) James Bolabiu
(Fiji) Samuela Tuidraki

=== Round 2 ===
19 June 2010
13:10 (UTC-11)

Fiji	41 – 38	Tonga
Try: Bakaniceva 29' c C. Ma'afu 45' c K. Bola 64' c Waqaniburotu 68' c Kalou 73' c Con: T. Rawaqa (5/5) 30', 46', 65', 69', 74'; Pen: T. Rawaqa (2/2) 28', 56'	Report	Try: Lilo (2) 2' c, 13' c Fatafehi 19' c Kalamafoni 24' c Olosoni 48' c Con: K. Morath (5/5) 3', 14', 20', 25', 49'; Pen: K. Morath (1/1) 35'

Apia Park, Apia
Referee: Peter Fitzgibbon (Ireland)

Fiji
FB	15	Taniela Rawaqa
RW	14	Bakaniceva	(substituted off) 62'
OC	13	Ropate Ratu
IC	12	Sireli Naqelevuki
LW	11	Nemani Nadolo	(substituted off) 54'
FH	10	Jonetani Ralulu
SH	9	Nikola Matawalu	(substituted off) 52'
N8	8	Kelepi Ketedromo	(substituted off) 62'
OF	7	Samu Bola	(substituted off) 52'
BF	6	Dominiko Waqaniburotu (c)
RL	5	Leone Nakarawa
LL	4	Sekonaia Kalou
TP	3	Alefoso Yalayalatabua
HK	2	Viliame Veikoso	(substituted off) 62'
LP	1	Campese Ma'afu	(substituted off) 65'
Replacements:
HK	16	Talemaitoga Tuapati	(substituted in) 62'
PR	17	Graham Dewes	(substituted in) 65'
LK	18	Mosese Volavola	(substituted in) 62'
FL	19	Dale Mataluvu	(substituted in) 52'
SH	20	Kelemedi Bola	(substituted in) 52'
CE	21	Josatiki Naisilisili	(substituted in) 62'
WG	22	William Saukuru	(substituted in) 54'
Coach:
(Fiji) Sam Domoni

FB	15	Vunga Lilo	(yellow card) 27' to 37'
RW	14	William Helu
OC	13	Alipate Fatafehi
IC	12	Manu Ahotaʻeʻiloa
LW	11	Alaska Taufa
FH	10	Kurt Morath	(substituted off) 69'
SH	9	Samisoni Fisilau	(substituted off) 56'
N8	8	Sione Kalamafoni
OF	7	Paula Kata	(substituted off) 60'
BF	6	Atunaisa Sikalu	(substituted off) 60'
RL	5	Sitiveni Mafi
LL	4	Alepini Olosoni
TP	3	Poʻaloʻi Taula	(substituted off) 62'
HK	2	Aleki Lutui (c)	(substituted off) 75'
LP	1	Toma Toke	(substituted off) 62'
Replacements:
HK	16	Sione Vaiomoʻunga	(substituted in) 75'
PR	17	Sione Fukofuka	(substituted in) 62'
LK	18	Viliami Pola	(substituted in) 62'
FL	19	Akameta Feao	(substituted in) 60' (yellow card) 63' to 73'
FL	20	Haani Halaeua	(substituted in) 60'
SH	21	Daniel Morath	(substituted in) 56'
FH	22	Fangatapu Apikotoa	(substituted in) 69'
Coach:
(New Zealand) Isitolo Maka

Touch judges:
(Samoa) Tui Komiti
(Samoa) Kelekolio Petelo

19 June 2010
16:10 (UTC-11)

Samoa	23 – 31	Japan
Try: Stowers 13' m Pesamino 31' m Tekori 38' c Con: Lui (1/3) 39'; Pen: Lui (2/2) 11', 14'	Report	Try: Nicholas (2) 24' c, 33' c Onozawa 28' m Con: Arlidge (2/3) 25', 34'; Pen: Arlidge (3/3) 7', 40', 46'; Drop: Arlidge (1/1) 77'

Apia Park, Apia
Referee: Wayne Barnes (England)

Samoa
FB	15	Paul Williams	(substituted off) 40'
RW	14	Mikaele Pesamino
OC	13	Gavin Williams
IC	12	Jamie Helleur	(substituted off) 72'
LW	11	David Lemi
FH	10	Lolo Lui
SH	9	Junior Poluleuligaga	(substituted off) 40'
N8	8	George Stowers
OF	7	Falemiga Selesele	(substituted off) 66'
BF	6	Joe Tekori
RL	5	Pelu Taele	(substituted off) 40'
LL	4	Filipo Levi
TP	3	Anthony Perenise
HK	2	Mahonri Schwalger (c)	(substituted off) 76'
LP	1	James Afoa	(substituted off) 40'
Replacements:
HK	16	Andrew Williams	(substituted in) 76'
PR	17	Census Johnston	(substituted in) 40'
LK	18	Ofisa Treviranus	(substituted in) 40'
FL	19	Alafoti Fa'osiliva	(substituted in) 66'
SH	20	Uale Mai	(substituted in) 40'
CE	21	Josh Keil	(substituted in) 72'
WG	22	Rupeni Levasa	(substituted in) 40'
Coach:
(Samoa) Titimaea Tafua

Japan
FB	15	Kaoru Matsushita	(substituted off) 65'
RW	14	Kosuke Endo
OC	13	Hirotoki Onozawa	(substituted off) 73'
IC	12	Ryan Nicholas
LW	11	Alisi Tupuailei
FH	10	James Arlidge
SH	9	Fumiaki Tanaka	(substituted off) 65'
N8	8	Koliniasi Holani
OF	7	Touetsu Taufa	58' to 67'	(substituted off) 67'
BF	6	Takashi Kikutani (c)
RL	5	Toshizumi Kitagawa	(substituted off) 70'
LL	4	Hitoshi Ono
TP	3	Kensuke Hatakeyama	Substituted off
HK	2	Shota Horie
LP	1	Naoki Kawamata	(yellow card) 55' to 65'
Replacements:
HK	16	Hiroki Yuhara	Substituted in
PR	17	Hisateru Hirashima	(substituted in) 58' (substituted off) 67'
LK	18	Luke Thompson	(substituted in) 60'
FL	19	Sione Vatuvei	(substituted in) 67'
FL	20	Tomoki Yoshida	(substituted in) 65'
SH	21	Shaun Webb	(substituted in) 66'
FH	22	Ryo Kanazawa	(substituted in) 73'
Coach:
(New Zealand) John Kirwan

Touch judges:
(Fiji) James Bolabiu
(Fiji) Samuela Tuidraki

- Hirotoki Onozawa became the 12th player in history to score his 40th Test try.

=== Round 3 ===
26 June 2010
13:10 (UTC-11)

Japan	26 – 23	Tonga
Try: Hatakeyama 51' c Penalty try 80+4' c Con: Arlidge (2/2) 51', 80+4'; Pen: Arlidge (4/4) 18', 40', 45', 73'	Report	Try: Helu 3' c Fatafehi 27' c Con: K. Morath (2/2) 5', 28'; Pen: K. Morath (3/3) 11', 42', 76'

Apia Park, Apia
Referee: Steve Walsh (Australia)

Japan
FB	15	Kaoru Matsushita	(substituted off) 57'
RW	14	Kosuke Endo
OC	13	Alisi Tupuailei
IC	12	Ryan Nicholas	(substituted off) 5'
LW	11	Hirotoki Onozawa
FH	10	James Arlidge
SH	9	Fumiaki Tanaka	(substituted off) 77'
N8	8	Koliniasi Holani	(substituted off) 40'
OF	7	Touetsu Taufa
BF	6	Takashi Kikutani (c)
RL	5	Toshizumi Kitagawa	(substituted off) 52'
LL	4	Hitoshi Ono
TP	3	Kensuke Hatakeyama
HK	2	Shota Horie
LP	1	Hisateru Hirashima	(substituted off) 73'
Replacements:
HK	16	Hiroki Yuhara
PR	17	Naoki Kawamata	(substituted in) 73'
LK	18	Luke Thompson	(substituted in) 52'
FL	19	Michael Leitch	(substituted in) 40'
FL	20	Koji Wada	(substituted in) 77'
SH	21	Shaun Webb	(substituted in) 57'
FH	22	Ryo Kanazawa	(substituted in) 5'
Coach:
(New Zealand) John Kirwan

FB	15	Vunga Lilo
RW	14	William Helu	(substituted off) 72'
OC	13	Alipate Fatafehi
IC	12	Andrew Mailei	(substituted off) 45'
LW	11	Alaska Taufa
FH	10	Kurt Morath
SH	9	Mahe Fangupo	(substituted off) 55'
N8	8	Sione Kalamafoni (c)
OF	7	Haani Halaeua	(substituted off) 38'
BF	6	Kelepi Halafihi	(substituted off) 55'
RL	5	Sitiveni Mafi
LL	4	Alepini Olosoni
TP	3	Makoni Finau	(substituted off) 53'
HK	2	Sione Vaiomoʻunga	(substituted off) 38'
LP	1	Toma Toke
Replacements:
HK	16	Aleki Lutui	(substituted in) 38' (yellow card) 41' to 51'
PR	17	Poʻaloʻi Taula	(substituted in) 53'
LK	18	Aloisio Mailangi	(substituted in) 55'
FL	19	Paula Kata	(substituted in) 38'
SH	20	Samisoni Fisilau	(substituted in) 55'
WG	21	Manu Ahotaʻeʻiloa	(substituted in) 72'
CE	22	Saia Fekitoa	(substituted in) 45'
Coach:
(New Zealand) Isitolo Maka

Touch judges:
(Samoa) Tui Komiti
(Samoa) Kelekolio Petelo

26 June 2010
16:10 (UTC-11)

Fiji	9 – 31	Samoa
Pen: T. Rawaqa (3/3) 35', 49', 65'	Report	Try: Tekori 16' c Pesamino 23' c Fa'osiliva (2) 70' m, 73' c Mai 80' m Con: Lui (3/5) 17', 24', 74'

Apia Park, Apia
Referee: Romain Poite (France)

Fiji
FB	15	Taniela Rawaqa
RW	14	Ropate Ratu
OC	13	Sireli Naqelevuki
IC	12	Iliesa Keresoni	(substituted off) 62'
LW	11	William Saukuru
FH	10	Jonetani Ralulu	(substituted off) 74'
SH	9	Nikola Matawalu	(substituted off) 50'
N8	8	Mosese Volavola	(substituted off) 74'
OF	7	Samu Bola	(substituted off) 40'
BF	6	Dominiko Waqaniburotu (c)
RL	5	Leone Nakarawa
LL	4	Sekonaia Kalou
TP	3	Alefoso Yalayalatabua
HK	2	Viliame Veikoso	(substituted off) 40'
LP	1	Campese Ma'afu	(substituted off) 50'
Replacements:
HK	16	Talemaitoga Tuapati	(substituted in) 40'
PR	17	Graham Dewes	(substituted in) 50'
N8	18	Rupeni Nasiga	(substituted in) 74' (yellow card) 78' to 80'
FL	19	Dale Tonawai	(substituted in) 40'
SH	20	Kelemedi Bola	(substituted in) 50'
CE	21	Josatiki Naisilisili	(substituted in) 62'
FH	22	Epeli Ruivadra	(substituted in) 74'
Coach:
(Fiji) Sam Domoni

Samoa
FB	15	Paul Williams
RW	14	Mikaele Pesamino
OC	13	George Pisi	(substituted off) 65'
IC	12	Jamie Helleur	(substituted off) 74'
LW	11	David Lemi
FH	10	Lolo Lui
SH	9	Uale Mai
N8	8	George Stowers	(substituted off) 61'
OF	7	Manaia Salavea	(yellow card) 53' to 63'
BF	6	Ofisa Treviranus
RL	5	Joe Tekori	(substituted off) 72'
LL	4	Kane Thompson
TP	3	Anthony Perenise	(substituted off) 67'
HK	2	Mahonri Schwalger (c)
LP	1	Sakaria Taulafo
Replacements:
HK	16	Andrew Williams
PR	17	Census Johnston	(substituted in) 67'
LK	18	Filipo Levi	(substituted in) 72'
N8	19	Alafoti Fa'osiliva	(substituted in) 61'
SH	20	Junior Poluleuligaga
CE	21	Fautua Otto	(substituted in) 74'
CE	22	Rupeni Levasa	(substituted in) 65'
Coach:
(Samoa) Titimaea Tafua

Touch judges:
(Fiji) James Bolabiu
(Fiji) Samuela Tuidraki

== Top scorers ==
=== Top points scorers ===
Rank	Player	Team	Points
1	Kurt Morath	Tonga	39
2	James Arlidge	Japan	32
3	Taniela Rawaqa	Fiji	25
4	Lolo Lui	Samoa	20
5	Vunga Lilo	Tonga	15
5	Mikaele Pesamino	Samoa	15
7	Ryan Nicholas	Japan	13
8	Alafoti Faosiliva	Samoa	10
8	Alipate Fatafehi	Tonga	10
8	Joe Tekori	Samoa	10

Source: irb.com

=== Top try scorers ===
Rank	Player	Team	Tries
1	Vunga Lilo	Tonga	3
1	Mikaele Pesamino	Samoa	3
3	Alafoti Faosiliva	Samoa	2
3	Alipate Fatafehi	Tonga	2
3	Ryan Nicholas	Japan	2
3	Joe Tekori	Samoa	2
7	18 players + 2 penalty tries		1

Source: irb.com

== See also ==
- 2010 IRB Nations Cup
