= Timani =

Timani is a surname. Notable people with the surname include:

- Lopeti Timani (born 1990), Tongan rugby union player
- Sione Timani (born 1984), Tongan rugby union player
- Sitaleki Timani (born 1986), Tongan-born, Australian rugby union player
