= Epeli Ruivadra =

Epeli Ruivadra may refer to:

- Epeli Ruivadra (rugby union, born 1977)
- Epeli Ruivadra (rugby union, born 1986)
