= DuRandt Gerber =

- Full name: DuRandt Gerber
- Born: 28 February 1982 (age 44) George, South Africa
- Height: 1.86 m (6 ft 1 in)
- Weight: 94 kg (14 st 11 lb; 207 lb)
- School: Outeniqua High School, George

Rugby union career
- Position: Fly-half / Winger / Full-back
Youth career
- 2001: SWD Eagles
- 2005: Limpopo Blue Bulls
Senior career
Years	Team	Apps	(Points)
2006–2007	Frascati		
2007–2008	Novaco Alghero		
2008–2011	Parma	50	(129)
2011–2012	L'Aquila	18	(144)
2012–2013	Lazio	19	(141)
2013	Griquas	6	(2)
2013–present	Lazio		
- Correct as of 1 November 2013
International career
Years	Team	Apps	(Points)
2011	Italy A	1	(0)
- Correct as of 24 July 2013

DuRandt Gerber (born 28 February 1982) is a South African-born Italian rugby union player. He can play as a fly-half, winger or full-back.

== Career ==
=== Youth ===
He started his career playing for his school side. Formerly a full-back, he played for Outeniqua High School second team. He moved to the fly-half position and was included in the SWD U19 team in 2001. In 2005, he moved to Pietersburg and played for the Limpopo Blue Bulls amateur and country districts teams.

=== Italian club rugby ===
Gerber moved to Italy in 2006, joining Frascati for the 2006–2007 season and Algero in 2007–08. The following season, he signed a deal with Gran Parma, where he spent the next three seasons. He won the "Player-of-the-Season" award and was the top try scorer for Parma in the 2009–2010 Super 10 season. The team played as Gran Ducato Parma in the new National Championship of Excellence in 2010–2011 and he was once again the top try scorer with six tries.

He played for L'Aquila in the 2011–2012 season and for Lazio for 2012–13.

=== Return to South Africa ===
In 2013, he returned to South Africa and joined Griquas for the 2013 Currie Cup Premier Division season.

=== Return to Italy ===
After making just six appearances for Griquas, however, he returned to Italy to join former side Lazio.

=== Italy A ===
He represented Italy 'A' in the 2011 Churchill Cup. He was also included in the training camp for the national team for the 2011 Rugby World Cup, but missed out on the final group.
