= William Saukuru =

- Full name: William Ross Saukuru
- Born: 16 February 1988 (age 38) Suva, Fiji
- Height: 6 ft 1 in (185 cm)
- Weight: 191 lb (87 kg)
- School: Nadi Muslim College

Rugby union career
- Position: Utility back
Senior career
| Years | Team | Apps | (Points) |
| 2011–13 | Buller | 27 | (78) |
| 2014 | Canterbury | 1 | (0) |
International career
| Years | Team | Apps | (Points) |
| 2010 | Fiji | 2 | (0) |

William Ross Saukuru (born 16 February 1988) is a Fijian former rugby union player.

Saukuru was born in Suva and educated at Nadi Muslim College.

A utility back, Saukuru represented Fiji at the 2008 Junior World Championship in Wales. He was called up by Fiji for the 2010 Pacific Nations Cup, debuting for the Flying Fijians on the wing against Samoa in Apia, before he gained a second cap off the bench in Fiji's win over Tonga.

From 2011 to 2014, Saukuru played his rugby in New Zealand's South Island, representing Buller and Canterbury in provincial matches. He was named the 2014 "men's sevens player of the year" by Canterbury Rugby.

== See also ==
- List of Fiji national rugby union players
