= Joe Tekori =

Samoan rugby union player

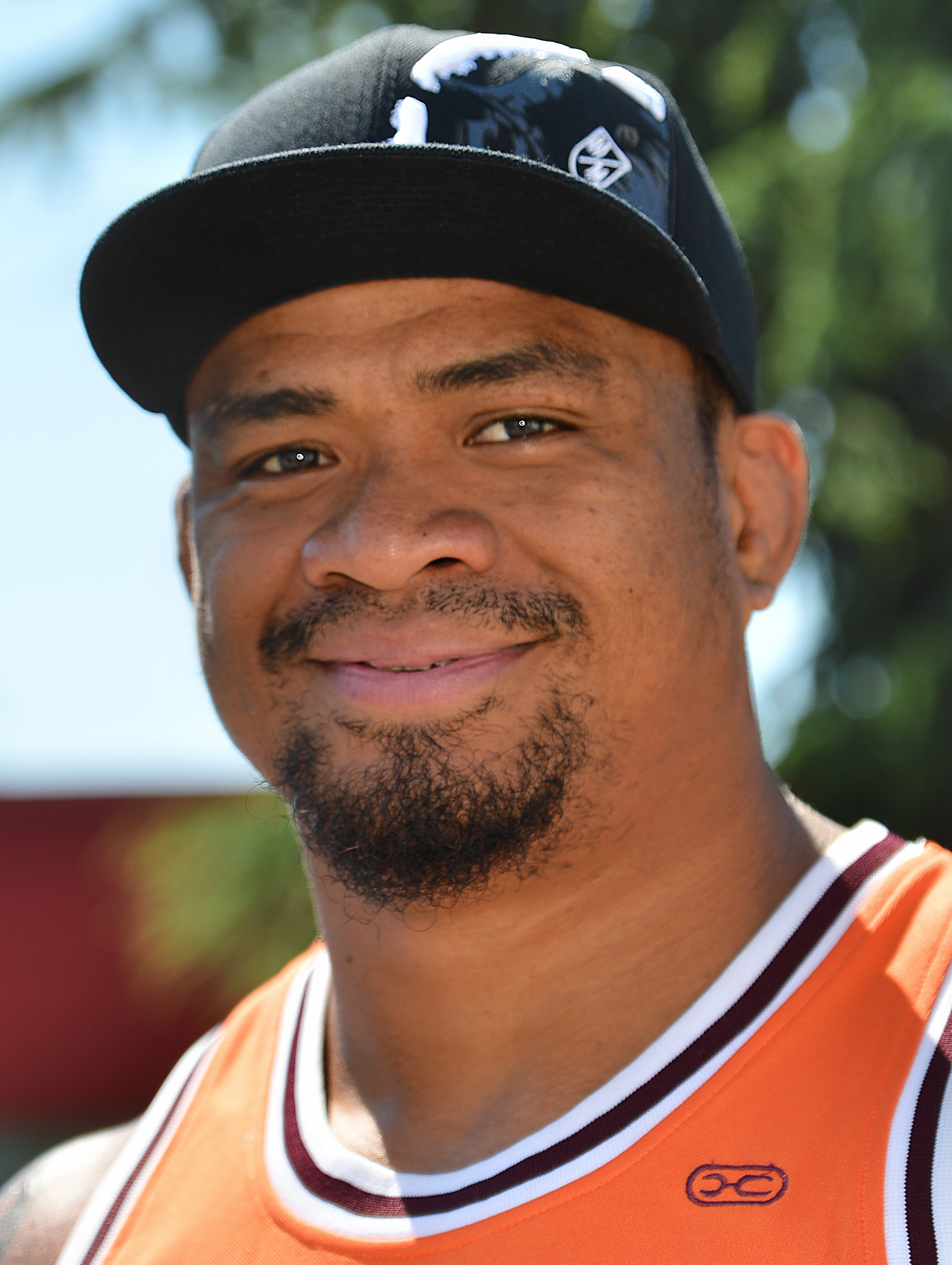
- Tekori in 2016
- Born: Joseph Iosefa Tekori; 17 December 1983 (age 42) Moto'otua, Samoa
- Height: 1.98 m (6 ft 6 in)
- Weight: 131 kg (20 st 9 lb)
- School: Wesley College

Rugby union career
- Position(s): Lock, Number 8, Flanker
Amateur team(s)
Years	Team	Apps	(Points)
- Waitakere City
Senior career
Years	Team	Apps	(Points)
2007–13	Castres	158	(160)
2013–22	Toulouse	229	(134)
- Correct as of 29 May 2021
Provincial / State sides
Years	Team	Apps	(Points)
2006–07	Auckland	3	(5)
International career
Years	Team	Apps	(Points)
2007–18	Samoa	37	(25)
- Correct as of 6 June 2022

Iosefa Tekori (born 17 December 1983) is a Samoan rugby union international player. He currently plays for the Stade Toulousain in the Top 14 in France. He plays as a lock.

== Honours ==
=== Castres ===
- Top 14: 2012–13

=== Toulouse ===
- Top 14: 2018–19, 2020–21
- European Rugby Champions Cup: 2020–21

=== Samoa ===
- Pacific Nations Cup: 2010, 2012, 2014
