= Paul Williams (rugby union player) =

Samoa international rugby union player

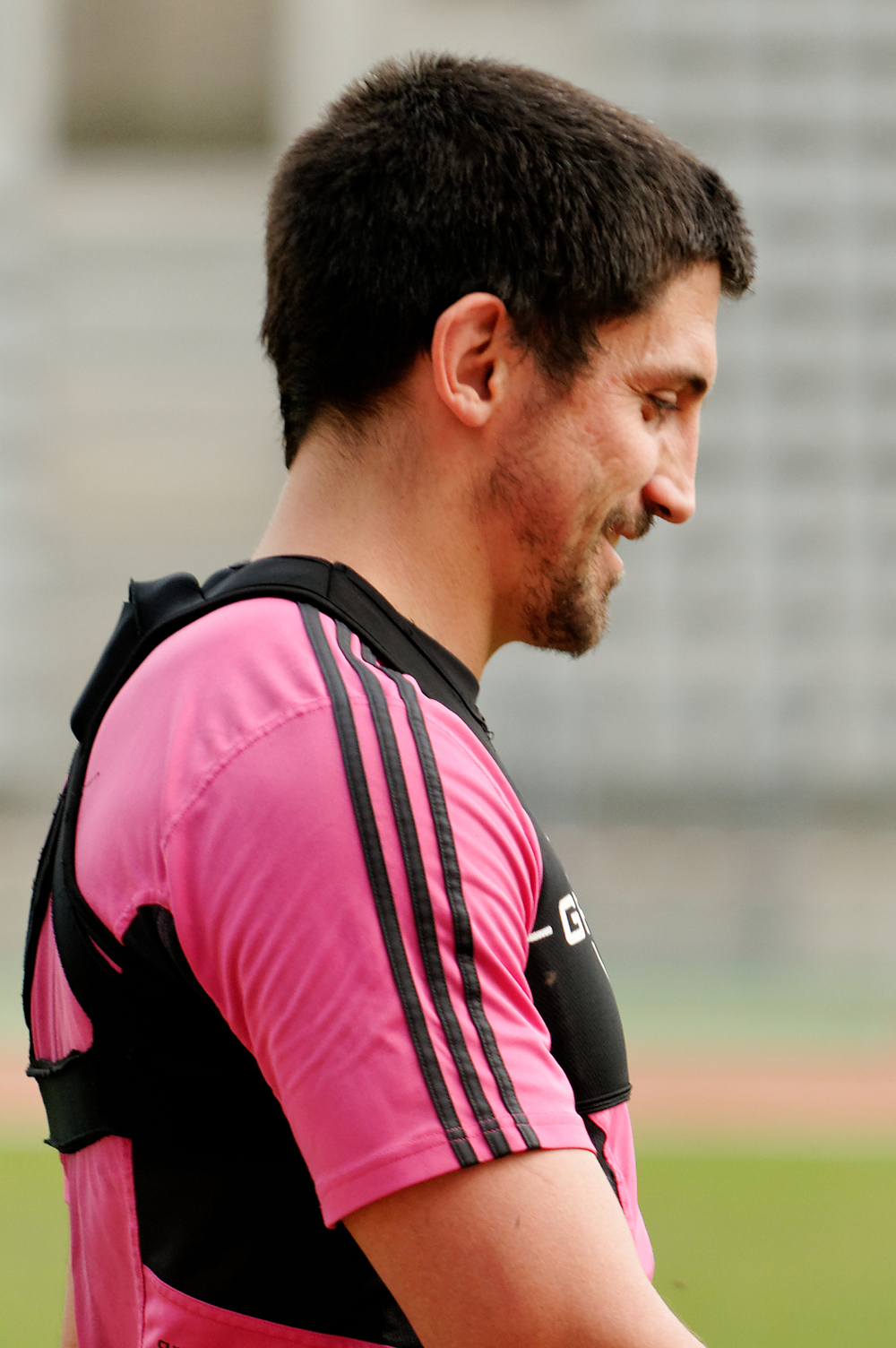
- Born: Paul Bryan Williams; 22 April 1983 (age 43) Auckland, New Zealand
- Height: 189 cm (6 ft 2 in)
- Weight: 100 kg (15 st 10 lb; 220 lb)
- School: Mount Albert Grammar School
- University: Auckland University of Technology
- Notable relative(s): Bryan Williams (father); Gavin Williams (brother)

Rugby union career
- Position(s): Centre, Fullback, Wing
Amateur team(s)
Years	Team	Apps	(Points)
- Ponsonby
Senior career
Years	Team	Apps	(Points)
2010–2011	Sale	19	(23)
2011–2018	Stade Français	76	(69)
- Correct as of 6 November 2016
Provincial / State sides
Years	Team	Apps	(Points)
2002–2005	Auckland		
2006–2008	Canterbury	27	(40)
2009	Auckland	11	(20)
Super Rugby
Years	Team	Apps	(Points)
2003–2006	Highlanders	6	(5)
2007	Crusaders	0	(0)
2008	Highlanders	13	(21)
2009–2010	Blues	24	(37)
International career
Years	Team	Apps	(Points)
2002	New Zealand U19		
2010–2018	Samoa	19	(72)
- Correct as of 12 November 2016

Paul Williams (born 22 April 1983) is a New Zealand-born Samoan international rugby union player who plays for Stade Français in the French Top 14. His regular playing positions are Centre, Wing and fullback. He is a son of former All Black Bryan Williams and the brother of Gavin Williams, who plays internationally for Samoa and for French club Clermont.

== Playing career ==
=== New Zealand ===
Williams was born 22 April 1983 in Auckland, New Zealand.

As one of the most promising young players in New Zealand rugby, Williams was signed by the Highlanders for the 2003 season, aged only 19 and having never played NPC rugby. He quickly showed his ability, earning the starting job at fullback and scoring his first Super Rugby try before suffering a broken leg in his 6th appearance for the side. Williams' broken leg would turn into a nightmare, as it failed to heal properly and required multiple operations, including a re-breaking of the bone in 2004. He was provisionally named in the Highlanders squad for the 2004 season and again for the 2006 season, but dropped out before each season when it became obvious he wasn't fully recovered.

Finally healthy in 2006, Williams signed for Canterbury and made 4 appearances in the 2006 Air New Zealand Cup, which were his first competitive games in over three years. Despite the limited game action, he was signed by the Crusaders for the 2007 season, although he didn't see any game action. Back with Canterbury for the 2007 Air New Zealand Cup, Williams appeared in every match – mainly on the wing – and impressed with his solid performances. This saw him re-signed by the Highlanders for the 2008 season, where he started all 13 matches and earned All Black consideration for his strong play at fullback. He played for Canterbury in the 2008 Air New Zealand Cup, where his excellent form continued as he scored 6 tries in helping his side to the title.

In 2009 Williams returned to his hometown of Auckland. He spent the 2009 season and 2010 season with the Auckland Blues, where he was a consistent player. However, he played off the bench as often as he started. He also played for Auckland in the 2009 Air New Zealand Cup, and he was named Auckland player of the year in 2009.

=== Europe ===
After declaring for Samoa internationally in 2010, Williams signed with the Sale Sharks of the Aviva Premiership for the 2010–11 season. Williams was a regular starter for the Sharks at fullback, scoring 2 tries in 20 appearances. However, he chose to leave Sale after only one season to sign in France with Stade Français for the 2010–11 season.

== International career ==
In May 2008 Williams gained selection for a New Zealand training squad for the 2008 international season, however he never played for the All Blacks.

Williams was eligible to play for Samoa internationally as he spent much of his childhood in the country while his father was coaching the Samoan national team. Unlikely to make the All Blacks squad for the 2011 Rugby World Cup, he declared his intention to play for Samoa in 2010 and made his debut against Tonga in the 2010 IRB Pacific Nations Cup on 12 June.
