= Paul Emerick =

Former American rugby union player/current coach

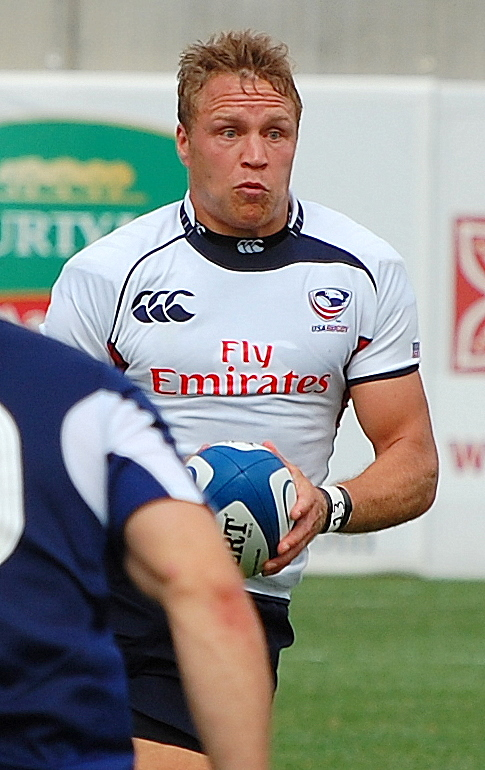
- Emerick at the Churchill Cup 2010 vs Russia
- Born: Paul Louis Emerick; January 24, 1980 (age 46) Emmetsburg, Iowa
- Height: 6 ft 1 in (1.85 m)
- Weight: 215 lb (98 kg)

Rugby union career
- Position(s): Centre, Wing
Amateur team(s)
Years	Team	Apps	(Points)
2000–2004	Northern Iowa Panthers		
2010	Malone RFC		
Senior career
Years	Team	Apps	(Points)
2004–2005	Amatori Catania	1	(0)
2005–2006	Overmach Parma	5	(5)
2006–2008	Dragons	43	(15)
2008–2010	Overmach Parma	38	(25)
2010	Ulster Rugby	2	(0)
2011–2013	London Wasps	4	(0)
International career
Years	Team	Apps	(Points)
2003–2012	United States	53	(85)
- Correct as of 30 December 2012
National sevens team
Years	Team		Comps
2002–05, 09–10	United States		17
- Correct as of 28 Feb 2012
Coaching career
- Years: Team
- 2018–2021: Houston SaberCats (assistant)
- 2019: Houston SaberCats (interim head coach)
- 2022–: American Raptors

Paul Emerick (born January 24, 1980) is the head coach of the American Raptors in Glendale, Colorado. He was the defense and skills coach and the 2019 interim head coach for the Houston SaberCats of Major League Rugby. He was a former USA international rugby player. He played centre, fullback or wing for the USA Eagles. Last played professionally for London Wasps.

== Club ==
Emerick was born in Emmetsburg, Iowa, and played his university rugby with the University of Northern Iowa Panthers. He then moved into senior rugby with the Chicago Lions. He moved to Italian rugby in the 2004–05 season joining Amatori Catania and then to Overmach Parma the following season. In the summer of 2006, Emerick completed a move to Celtic League side Newport Gwent Dragons, the side he helped knock out of the Heineken Cup in a playoff a few months earlier with Overmach Parma. In 2008, Emerick re-joined Italian club Overmach Parma from Welsh regional side Newport Gwent Dragons. Overmach Parma had gone through a re-organisation that saw the club merge with Noceto in August 2010 to form Crusaders Rugby Parma. In September 2010, he joined Ulster Rugby on a 3-month contract. He signed a deal with London Wasps in February 2012. On August 7, 2013, Emerick announced his retirement from professional rugby.

== International career ==
Emerick was first capped by the USA Eagles in April 2003 against Spain and as of September 2011 Emerick has been capped 54 times becoming the first back in Eagles history to have more than 50 caps. As of June 19, 2012, Emerick had notched 15 career tries for the United States, ranking him second on the all-time list and first among active players.

Emerick received a yellow card in the closing minutes of the Eagles' 2007 Rugby World Cup match against England for a tip tackle on England's Olly Barkley. Emerick was subsequently suspended for five weeks, ruling him out of the remaining Rugby World Cup campaign. He was suspended for ten weeks in 2009 for kicking Canadian center D. T. H. van der Merwe in the head during a qualifying match for the 2011 Rugby World Cup.

== Coaching career ==
Paul Emerick is the skills and defense coach for the Houston SaberCats of Major League Rugby on September 20, 2018.

== International tries ==
Try	Opposing team	Venue	Competition	Date	Result	Score	Ref.
1	Uruguay	Cricket and Rugby Club, Buenos Aires	2003 Pan-American Championship	August 30, 2003	Won	31–17	
2	Canada	Commonwealth Stadium, Edmonton	2004 Churchill Cup	June 19, 2004	Lost	29–32	
3	Italy	Stadio Lamarmora, Biella	Test match	November 27, 2004	Lost	25–43	
4	Canada	Olympic Stadium, Tokyo	2005 Super Cup	May 25, 2005	Lost	26–30	
5	Barbados	Buck Shaw Stadium, Santa Clara	2007 Rugby World Cup Qualifier	July 1, 2006	Won	91–0	
6	Uruguay	Parque Central, Montevideo	2007 Rugby World Cup Qualifier	September 30, 2006	Won	42–13	
7	Uruguay	Stanford	2007 Rugby World Cup Qualifier	October 7, 2006	Won	33–7	
8	Uruguay	Stanford	2007 Rugby World Cup Qualifier	October 7, 2006	Won	33–7	
9	Uruguay	Rio Tinto Stadium, Sandy	Test match	November 8, 2008	Won	43–9	
10	Georgia	Dick's Sporting Goods Park, Commerce City	2009 Churchill Cup	June 21, 2009	Won	31–13	
11	Portugal	Estádio Universitário de Lisboa, Lisbon	Test match	November 13, 2010	Won	22–17	
12	Georgia	National Stadium, Tbilisi	Test match	November 27, 2010	Lost	17–19	
13	Tonga	Pillar Data Arena, Esher	2011 Churchill Cup	June 8, 2011	Lost	13–44	
14	Russia	Sixways Stadium, Worcester	2011 Churchill Cup	June 18, 2011	Won	32–25	
15	Ireland	Yarrow Stadium, New Plymouth	2011 Rugby World Cup	September 11, 2011	Lost	10–22	
16	Italy	BBVA Compass Stadium, Houston	Test match	June 23, 2012	Lost	10–30	
17	Romania	Stadionul Arcul de Triumf, Bucharest	Test match	November 24, 2012	Won	34–3	
