= Malakai Bakaniceva =

Fiji international rugby union player

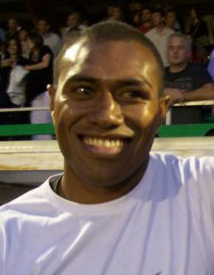
- Full name: Elia Malakai Bakaniceva Radikedike
- Born: 6 May 1985 (age 41) Nausori, Fiji
- Height: 6 ft 0 in (183 cm)
- Weight: 205 lb (93 kg)
- Notable relative(s): Vereniki Goneva (cousin); Saula Radidi (cousin)

Rugby union career
- Position: Wing
Senior career
Years	Team	Apps	(Points)
2008–11	US Colomiers		
2011–12	Tarbes Pyrénées		
2012–17	CA Brive		
2017–18	CS Bourgoin-Jallieu		
2018–20	Rouen Normandie		
International career
Years	Team	Apps	(Points)
2010–13	Fiji	3	(5)

Elia Malakai Bakaniceva Radikedike (born 6 May 1985) is a Fijian former professional rugby union player.

== Biography ==
Radikedike was born and raised in Nausori, where he began playing rugby at age 11.

=== Rugby career ===
A speedy winger, Radikedike spent most of his career in France, which began when he joined US Colomiers with his cousin Vereniki Goneva in 2008. He next played for Tarbes Pyrénées and then got an opportunity to compete in the Top 14 in a stint with CA Brive. After leaving Brive, Radikedike played for CS Bourgoin-Jallieu, then finished his professional career playing at Rouen Normandie from 2018 to 2020.

Radikedike was capped for both Fiji's sevens and XVs sides. He debuted for the Flying Fijians at the 2010 Pacific Nations Cup, with appearances against Japan and Tonga, before gaining a final cap in 2013 against Romania in Bucharest.

== See also ==
- List of Fiji national rugby union players
