= Pepa Koloamatangi =

Former rugby union player

- Full name: Osaiasi Pepa Veikune Koloamatangi
- Born: 18 June 1982 (age 44)
- Height: 6 ft 3 in (191 cm)
- Weight: 222 lb (101 kg)

Rugby union career
- Position: Flanker
Provincial / State sides
Years	Team	Apps	(Points)
2010	Counties Manukau	9	(0)
2014	Thames Valley	8	(0)
International career
Years	Team	Apps	(Points)
2011–12	Tonga	3	(0)

Osaiasi Pepa Veikune Koloamatangi (born 18 June 1982) is a Tongan former international rugby union player.

A Chiefs development player, Koloamatangi competed in New Zealand's National Provincial Championship with Counties Manukau and Thames Valley. He also played in Australia with the Waratahs club in Newcastle rugby.

Koloamatangi represented Tonga at the 2011 Churchill Cup in England, where he made his Test debut as an openside flanker in their win over the United States, then scored a try in an uncapped match against the England Saxons. He gained a further two caps for Tonga during the 2012 IRB Pacific Nations Cup.

== See also ==
- List of Tonga national rugby union players
