= Mitch Gudgeon =

Canada international rugby union player

- Full name: Mitchell Gudgeon
- Born: April 27, 1986 (age 40)
- Height: 6 ft 7 in (201 cm)
- Weight: 242 lb (110 kg)
- School: Oak Bay High School
- University: University of Victoria; Queen's University

Rugby union career
- Position: Lock
International career
Years	Team	Apps	(Points)
2010–11	Canada	2	(0)

Mitchell Gudgeon (born April 27, 1986) is a Canadian former international rugby union player.

Raised in Victoria, British Columbia, Gudgeon was educated at Oak Bay High School and excelled most in basketball growing up. He was the 2004 Sport BC high school athlete of the year and played varsity basketball for the Victoria Vikes. His university degree was in kinesiology and he later completed an MBA from Queen's University.

Gudgeon gained two caps as a lock on the Canada national rugby union team, against Belgium in Brussels in 2010 and Russia in the 2011 Churchill Cup. He was named in the extended squad for the 2011 Rugby World Cup.

== See also ==
- List of Canada national rugby union players
