= Joe Nasilisili =

Joe Naisilisili
- Full name: Josateki Nasilisili
- Born: 25 August 1983 (age 43) Suva, Fiji

Rugby union career
- Position: Centre
International career
Years	Team	Apps	(Points)
2010	Fiji	2	(0)

Josateki Nasilisili (born 25 August 1983) is a Fijian former professional rugby union player.

A centre, Nasilisili played his rugby in Fiji with Naitasiri and was capped twice for the national team, coming on off the bench against Tonga and Samoa in Apia at the 2010 IRB Pacific Nations Cup.

Nasilisili represented the Fiji Police rugby league team at the 2013 World Cup in England, where they were beaten in the final by Australia, after which he was signed to play professional rugby union with Strasbourg.

== See also ==
- List of Fiji national rugby union players
