= Troy Hall =

US international rugby union player

- Born: February 16, 1982 (age 44)
- Height: 5 ft 11 in (180 cm)
- Weight: 189 lb (86 kg)
- School: Thames High School

Rugby union career
- Position: Centre / Fullback
International career
Years	Team	Apps	(Points)
2011–15	United States	3	(0)

Troy Hall (born February 16, 1982) is a New Zealand–American former rugby union player.

Hall grew up in Thames in New Zealand's Waikato region and relocated to the United States in 2006.

A New York Athletic Club player, Hall made three capped appearances for the United States, debuting off the bench against Tonga in the 2011 Churchill Cup. He next played against Canada in the 2013 Pacific Nations Cup as a centre and the following year was a last-minute omission from the Eagles team to play the All Blacks in Chicago, before gaining his final cap as the starting fullback against Tonga in the 2015 Pacific Nations Cup.

== See also ==
- List of United States national rugby union players
