= Dale Tonawai =

Fijian rugby player (born 1980)

- Full name: Dale Tonawai Mataluvu
- Born: 9 May 1980 (age 46) Suva, Fiji
- Height: 6 ft 1 in (185 cm)
- Weight: 224 lb (102 kg)

Rugby union career
- Position: Back-row
International career
Years	Team	Apps	(Points)
2007–10	Fiji	3	(0)
Medal record
Men's rugby sevens
Representing Fiji
Pacific Games
Silver medal – second place	2011 Nouméa	Team competition

Dale Tonawai Mataluvu (born 9 May 1980) is a Fijian former international rugby union player.

A back-row forward from Lawai, Nadroga, Tonawai captained both the Army and Suva in Fijian rugby.

Tonawai made his debut for the Fiji XV against Tonga in Lautoka during the 2007 IRB Pacific Nations Cup and was capped a further two times at the 2010 IRB Pacific Nations Cup. He also competed for Fiji in rugby sevens and represented his country at the 2011 Pacific Games, where they finished with a silver medal.

== See also ==
- List of Fiji national rugby union players
