= Nese Malifa =

Samoan rugby union player (born 1985)

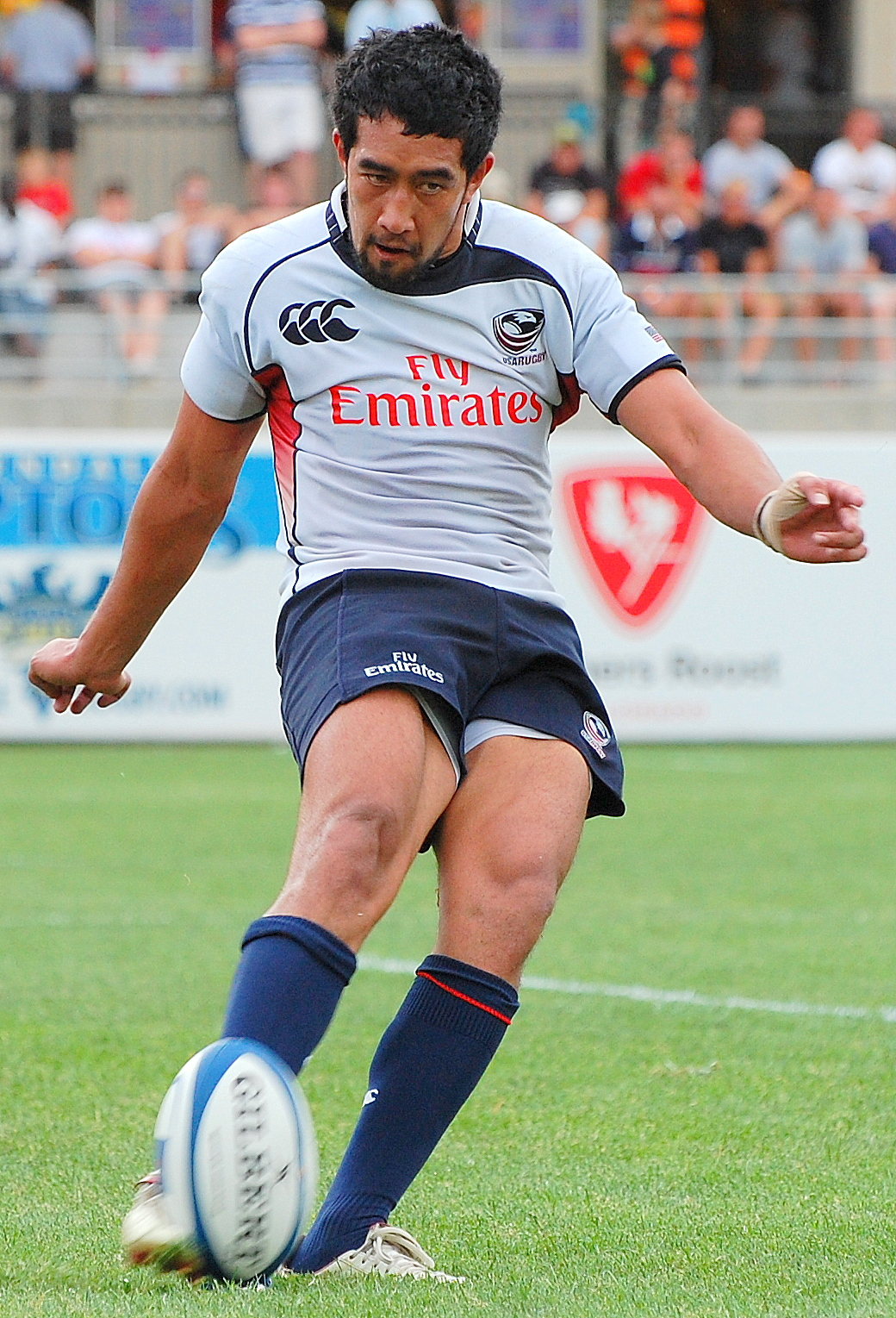
- Born: Valenese Malifa; September 10, 1985 (age 41) American Samoa
- Height: 5 ft 10 in (1.78 m)
- Weight: 180 lb (82 kg)
- Notable relative: Ata Malifa (twin brother)
- Occupation: Assistant Coach

Rugby union career
- Position: Fly-half
Amateur team(s)
| Years | Team | Apps | (Points) |
| 2009 | Belmont Shore RFC | | |
| 2010-2015 | Glendale Raptors | | |
Senior career
| Years | Team | Apps | (Points) |
| 2019– | Rugby ATL | | |
International career
| Years | Team | Apps | (Points) |
| 2007–2011 | United States | 23 | (65) |
National sevens team
| Years | Team | | Comps |
| 2007–2012 | United States | | 18 |

Valenese Malifa (born 10 September 1985, in American Samoa) is an American rugby union former fly-half. He has now turned his career to professional coaching in the US for Major League Rugby. He assisted Atlanta’s team, Rugby ATL, from 2018-2020 and has since moved to Dallas to coach the Dallas Jackals in their inaugural year. As a professional player, he was a member of the United States national rugby union team from 2007 until 2012, and competed in three Rugby World Cups including participating with the squad at the 2007 Rugby World Cup

== Youth ==
Nese Malifa played rugby since he was 17 years old. He played for Auckland and Samoa Rugby Clubs. During his stint in the Pacific Islands, Malifa was a representative rugby player in Auckland in both the XV’s and Sevens game, as well as playing representative rugby in Samoa. Malifa’s talents were noticed by selectors while playing for Ponsonby and then the Eden Club in Auckland. Lesser known are Malifa’s talents in other sporting codes, as Malifa represented Samoa in Cricket.

== Career ==
Malifa played club rugby since moving to the U.S. mainland in 2006, first with Belmont Shore, who Malifa helped reach the 2006 national championship. Malifa moved to Denver in 2010, where he has been playing with the Glendale Raptors.

He has now turned his career to professional coaching in the US for Major League Rugby. He assisted Atlanta’s team, Rugby ATL, from 2018-2020 and has since moved to Dallas to coach the Dallas Jackals in their inaugural year, 2022.

During his professional career, Malifa played flyhalf for the USA Hawks match against Canada West in the 2007 North America 4, notching all of his team's points through two converted tries and two penalty goals from two attempts.

Malifa played flyhalf for the United States national team since his debut against the England Saxons in 2007. Malifa made two appearances at the 2007 Rugby World Cup in France, and played 3 matches for the U.S. at the 2011 Rugby World Cup in New Zealand. Malifa's highest scoring match to date was against Russia in the 2011 Churchill Cup, where Malifa kicked 2 penalties and 3 conversions to lead the team in scoring with 12 points, as the U.S. edged out Russia 32-25. As of December 2011, Malifa has tallied 24 caps and 63 points for the U.S. national team.

Malifa played flyhalf for the United States national rugby sevens team, and was known for his excellent drop kick. Malifa led the U.S. in scoring during the 2009-10 IRB Sevens World Series with 120 points, helping the U.S. to its best ever 10th-place finish.

== Family ==
He is the twin brother Ata Malifa.
