= Samu Bola =

Fijian rugby union footballer (born 1983)

- Born: Malakai Samu Bola Volau; March 17, 1983 (age 43) Suva, Fiji
- Height: 1.88 m (6 ft 2 in)
- Weight: 108 kg (17 st 0 lb)
- Notable relative: Kelemedi Bola

Rugby union career
- Position: Flanker/No 8
- Current team: Fiji Barbarians
Youth career
- Lomaiviti
Senior career
Years	Team	Apps	(Points)
- Police Bluez
International career
Years	Team	Apps	(Points)
2010	Fiji		

Samuela Bola (born 17 March 1983, in Suva) is a Fijian rugby union footballer. He plays as a flanker for the Fiji Barbarians in the Pacific Rugby Cup. He is also part of the Fiji team to the 2010 IRB Pacific Nations Cup.
