= Sitaleki Timani =

Australia & Tonga international rugby union player

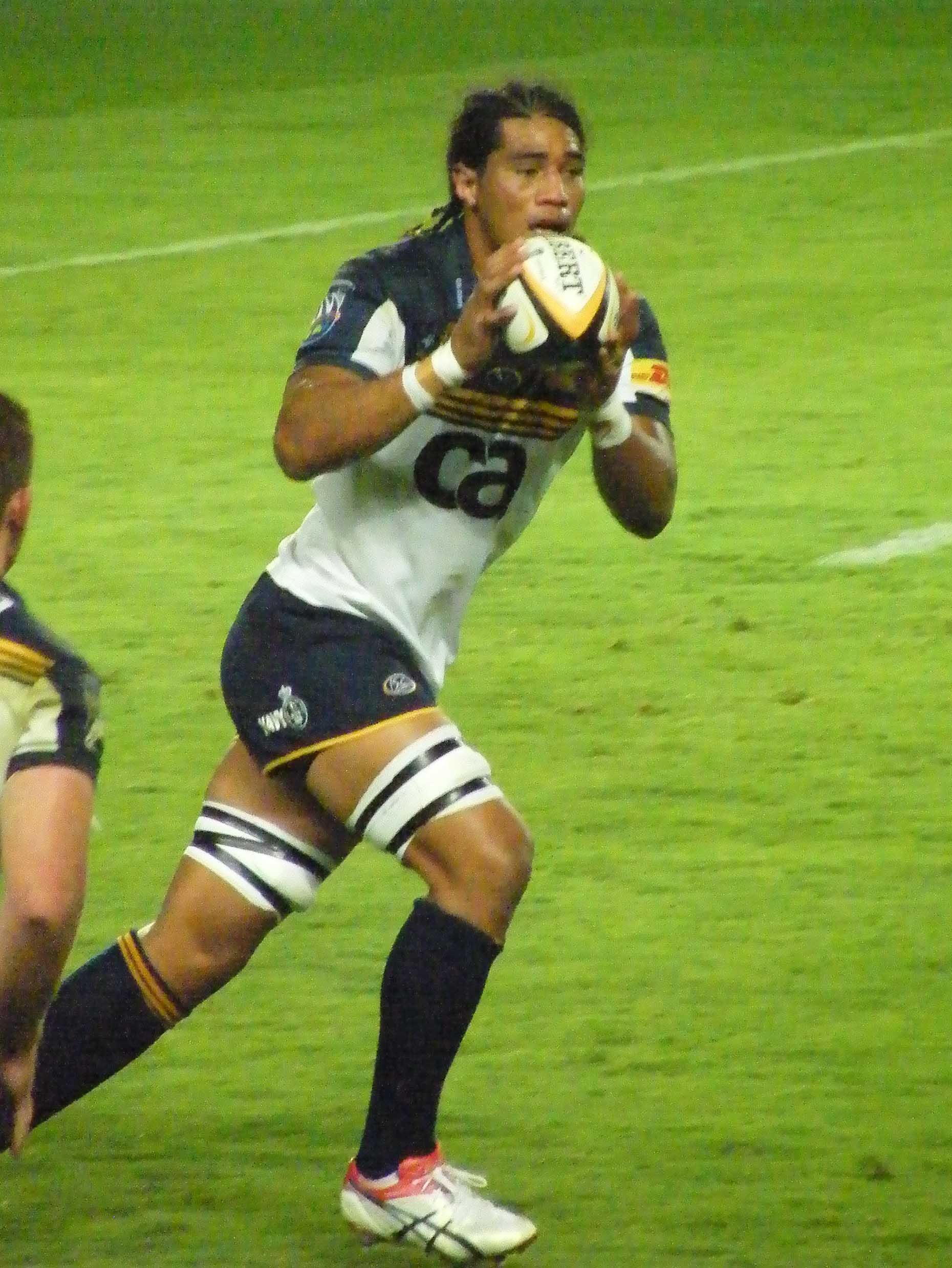
- Timani playing for the Brumbies
- Born: Sitaleki Timani; 19 September 1986 (age 40) Kolonga, Tonga
- Height: 2.03 m (6 ft 8 in)
- Weight: 118 kg (18.6 st; 260 lb)

Rugby union career
- Position(s): Lock, Blindside Flanker
Amateur team(s)
Years	Team	Apps	(Points)
2011–2013	Southern Districts	7	(0)
Senior career
Years	Team	Apps	(Points)
2007	Perth Spirit	8	(5)
2013–2016	Montpellier	45	(15)
2016–2021	Clermont	107	(35)
2022–	Toulon	8	(5)
- Correct as of 18 Aug 2022
Super Rugby
Years	Team	Apps	(Points)
2008	Western Force	3	(0)
2009–2010	Brumbies	8	(5)
2011–2013	Waratahs	44	(20)
2021–2022	Western Force	11	(0)
- Correct as of 18 Aug 2022
International career
Years	Team	Apps	(Points)
2011–2013	Australia	18	(0)
2025	Tonga	1	(0)
- Correct as of 24 November 2025

Sitaleki Timani (born 19 September 1986), is a Tongan-born, Australian professional rugby union footballer. He made his test debut for the Wallabies in 2011. His usual position is lock. Timani's professional club career spanned eight seasons of Top 14 in France and seven seasons of Super Rugby in Australia. He currently plays for the RC Toulonnais in the Top 14.

== Family and early life ==
Sitaleki Timani was born in the Tongan village of Kolonga. His brothers Sione and Lopeti are both international rugby players.

Timani played soccer until he attended Tonga College 'Atele and was introduced to rugby union. He was selected for the Tongan Schoolboys rugby team in 2003, and won a scholarship to attend Auckland Grammar School in New Zealand.

He moved to Australia at the age of 19 and switched codes, playing rugby league for Cronulla-Sutherland Sharks in the NRL's Jersey Flegg competition in 2006, and in NSW Premier League in 2007.

== Rugby union career ==
In August 2007, Timani returned to rugby union, playing for Perth Spirit in the Australian Rugby Championship. He was selected for all Perth Spirit matches for the season, and played 8 times as starting lock. The team finished third on the ARC ladder, but lost their semi-final to the eventual champion team, the Central Coast Rays. The following year, Timani made his Super Rugby debut for the Western Force against the Sharks on 15 February 2008 in Durban, although he only made 3 appearances for the franchise during the season. He moved to the Brumbies in 2009 and played most of the Super Rugby season, but then fell from favour and did not get any game time in 2010.

Timani then took up a development contract with the NSW Waratahs, and won a regular starting position in the 2011 season. At that time, he was eligible to play for both Tonga (by birth) and Australia (by residency). He chose Australia and was selected by the Wallabies, playing against Samoa at Stadium Australia in Sydney on 17 July 2011.

His decision to play for Australia meant he became ineligible to play for Tonga and it probably cost him an appearance at the Rugby World Cup later that year. He was not selected in the Australian squad for the 2011 tournament but probably would have been selected for Tonga, if eligible.

In 2013, he signed a three-year deal with French side Montpellier. Timani joined the club after travelling with the Wallabies on their 2013 end-of-year tour. He continued his career in the French Top 14 for another four years with Clermont from 2016.

Timani returned to Australia in 2021, rejoining the Western Force to play in the Super Rugby AU competition.

== Personal life ==
On 15 December 2012, Sitaleki married Angela (née Kelava), whom he had been dating for three years.
