= Epeli Ruivadra (rugby union, born 1986) =

Fijian rugby union player (born 1986)

- Born: 31 December 1986 (age 39) Suva, Fiji
- Height: 5 ft 10 in (178 cm)
- Weight: 191 lb (87 kg)
- School: Lelean Memorial School

Rugby union career
- Position: Utility back
International career
Years	Team	Apps	(Points)
2010	Fiji	3	(0)

Epeli Ruivadra (born 31 December 1986) is a Fijian former international rugby union player.

Ruivadra is the youngest of four siblings, born in Suva to national judo representative Viliame Modrau and Tailevu native Koini Liku. He was educated at Lelean Memorial School.

A speedy utility back, Ruivadra made his provincial debut for Tailevu at the age of 23 and competed at club level for the Navy team in Suva rugby. His Fiji debut came only two months after first making the "A" team and he was capped three times, all off the bench during the 2010 IRB Pacific Nations Cup.

== See also ==
- List of Fiji national rugby union players
