= Andrea Pratichetti =

Italy international rugby union player

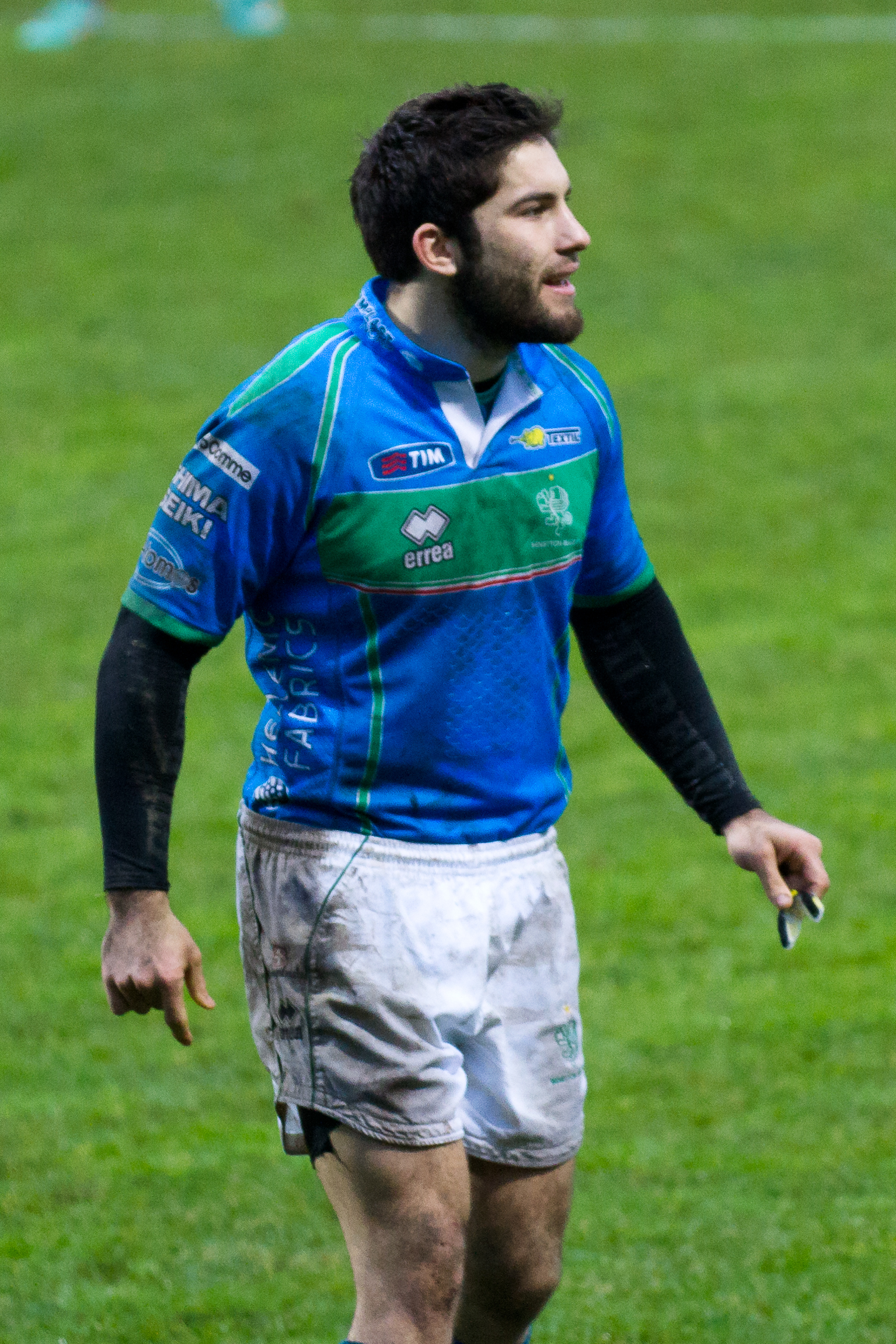
- Full name: Andrea Pratichetti
- Born: 26 November 1988 (age 37) Rome, Italy
- Height: 1.83 m (6 ft 0 in)
- Weight: 94 kg (14 st 11 lb; 207 lb)
- Notable relative: Matteo Pratichetti Carlo Pratichetti (uncle)

Rugby union career
- Position: Centre
- Current team: Benetton
Amateur team(s)
Years	Team	Apps	(Points)
2000–02	Rugby Roma		
2005–07	UR Capitolina		
Senior career
Years	Team	Apps	(Points)
2007–09	Calvisano	11	(10)
2009–10	Rovigo	25	(45)
2010–17	Benetton	87	(35)
2017–19	San Donà	22	(20)
2019−22	Mogliano	14	(0)
- Correct as of 25 June 2016
International career
Years	Team	Apps	(Points)
2007–08	Italy U20	5	(5)
2008-13	Emerging Italy	12	(15)
2012–16	Italy	4	(0)
2017–	Italy Sevens	25	((15))
- Correct as of 19 March 2016

Andrea Pratichetti (born 26 November 1988) is a retired Italian rugby union player who played for Mogliano as a centre in Top12 until 2021−22 season.

Pratichetti was raised at Rugby Roma, where his uncle Carlo was a player and then a coach. Andrea was then passed on to UR Capitolina's youth team, before being hired as a professional by Calvisano. At Calvisano he played alongside is older brother and Italian international Matteo. Andrea then joined Rovigo for a year, before signing for Treviso in 2010. He played for Benetton from 2010 to 2017.

He debuted for the Italian national rugby union team in 2012 against Canada. From 2017 he is also part of the Italy Sevens squad also to participate at the Qualifying Tournament for the 2020 Summer Olympics and the 2020 World Rugby Sevens Challenger Series.
