= Matteo Pratichetti =

Italian rugby union player

- Born: Matteo Pratichetti; 27 July 1985 (age 41) Rome, Italy
- Height: 1.91 m (6 ft 3 in)
- Weight: 100 kg (220 lb)
- Notable relative(s): Silvano Tartaglini, great-uncle Oreste Pratichetti, father Carlo Pratichetti, uncle Andrea Pratichetti, brother Flavia Tartaglini, cousin
- Occupation: Physiotherapist

Rugby union career
- Position: Wing/Centre
Youth career
- 2000–2003: Capitolina
Senior career
Years	Team	Apps	(Points)
2003–2004	Capitolina	13	(25)
2004–2009	Calvisano	66	(30)
2009–2010	Viadana	18	(10)
2010–2012	Aironi	26	(0)
2012–2018	Zebre	80	(15)
- Correct as of 29 July 2018
International career
Years	Team	Apps	(Points)
2004–2011	Italy	24	(25)
- Correct as of 29 July 2018

Matteo Pratichetti (born 27 July 1985) is an Italian former rugby union player.

Pratichetti's father, Oreste, was a rugby player and coach, his uncle Carlo was capped several times for Italy in the 1980s, and his brother Andrea was his teammate at Calvisano for the 2008–09 season.

Since his adolescence, Pratichetti played in the UR Capitolina's (one of the several Roman rugby union teams) youth squad; in 2004, at 19, he moved to Calvisano in the Super 10 and won the Italian Championship at the end of his debut season with his new club.

His first cap for Italy was in November 2004 against the All Blacks; his 2nd cap was more than 2 years later in the 2007 Six Nations Championship, with Pierre Berbizier as Italy's head coach. Berbizier included Pratichetti in the Italy squad for the 2007 Rugby World Cup.

Also the new head coach Nick Mallett included Pratichetti in the squad for the 2008 Summer tour of South Africa and Argentina.

Pratichetti won one more Super 10 with Calvisano in 2008. In June 2010 he joined Aironi.

== Honours ==
- Super 10: Calvisano 2004–05; 2007–08
- Italy national rugby union team: 24 caps, 5 tries
