= Lopeti Timani =

Australia & Tonga international rugby union player

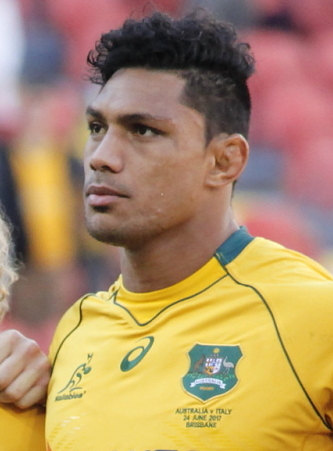
- Timani representing Australia in 2017
- Born: 28 September 1990 (age 36) Navutoka, Tonga
- Height: 1.95 m (6 ft 5 in)
- Weight: 122 kg (269 lb; 19 st 3 lb)
- School: Tonga College

Rugby union career
- Position(s): Lock, Flanker, Number 8
- Current team: Cardiff
Senior career
| Years | Team | Apps | (Points) |
| 2012–2013 | Waratahs | 19 | (0) |
| 2014–2018 | Rebels | 52 | (30) |
| 2014−2017 | Melbourne Rising | 19 | (35) |
| 2018–2021 | La Rochelle | 27 | (5) |
| 2021–2022 | Toulon | 12 | (5) |
| 2022– | Cardiff | 26 | (10) |
- Correct as of 21 June 2023
International career
| Years | Team | Apps | (Points) |
| 2016–2017 | Australia | 12 | (5) |
| 2021– | Tonga | 5 | (0) |
- Correct as of 21 June 2023
National sevens team
| Years | Team | | Comps |
| 2021 | Tonga | | 1 |
- Correct as of 21 June 2023

Lopeti Timani (born 28 September 1990) is a Tongan professional rugby union player who plays as a lock for United Rugby Championship club Cardiff and the Tonga national team.

== Early life ==
Lopeti Timani was born in the Tongan village of Navutoka. His older brothers Sione Timani and Sitaleki Timani are both international rugby players.

He attended Tonga College 'Atele on Tonga. In 2008 he was selected for Tonga's under-20s rugby world championship team at the age of 17, but could not play because of the minimum age limit of 18 imposed by the International Rugby Board.

At age 18, he moved to Australia and switched codes, playing rugby league for the Canterbury-Bankstown Bulldogs in the NRL's Toyota Cup competition in 2009 and 2010.

== Professional career ==
In 2011, Timani returned to rugby union, joining the Junior Waratahs professional squad where he played in the Pacific Rugby Cup. He played for the Southern Districts Rugby Club in the Shute Shield, where he developed his ability to play at lock in addition to the back row.

He signed an extended player squad contract with the Waratahs for the 2012 season, and made his Super Rugby debut against the Reds in round one. He played against the British & Irish Lions in 2013.

Timani signed with the Melbourne Rebels for the 2014 and 2015 seasons.

In 2016, Timani debuted for Australia against Argentina in Perth before getting his run on debut against Argentina at Twickenham Stadium in London. This was seen as Timani's break out game as he continued as starting no.8 for his next 4 appearances.

Timani recommitted to Australia Rugby until 2019 turning down lucrative offers form Europe.

In August 2018, Timani travels to France to join Top 14 side La Rochelle ahead of the 2018-19 season. Lopeti played for La Rochelle for the 2018-2019, 2019-2020 & 2020-2021 seasons. La Rochelle made the final of the European Challenge Cup & the semi-final of the Top 14 in 2018-2019 season. In the 2020-2021 season La Rochelle made the final of the European Championship Cup & the final of the Top 14.

Timani has signed with Toulon in the Top 14 for the 2021-2022 season.

In June, Timani debuted for the Tonga sevens team at the Monaco Sevens tournament alongside Malakai Fekitoa, transferring his international affiliation from Australia to Tonga. On 6 November 2021, Timani made his test debut for Tonga in a 69-3 defeat by England as part of the 2021 Autumn Nations Series

On 27 April 2022, Timani and Cardiff Rugby confirmed that the number-8 will play for the URC team from the 2022-23 season onwards.

== Career statistics ==
=== Club summary ===
| Year | Team | Played | Start | Sub | Tries | Cons | Pens | Drop | Points | Yel | Red |
|---|---|---|---|---|---|---|---|---|---|---|---|
| 2012 | Waratahs | 14 | 0 | 14 | 0 | 0 | 0 | 0 | 0 | 0 | 0 |
| 2013 | Waratahs | 5 | 1 | 4 | 0 | 0 | 0 | 0 | 0 | 0 | 0 |
| 2014 | Rebels | 2 | 0 | 2 | 0 | 0 | 0 | 0 | 0 | 0 | 0 |
| 2015 | Rebels | 15 | 15 | 0 | 4 | 0 | 0 | 0 | 20 | 0 | 0 |
| 2016 | Rebels | 12 | 12 | 0 | 2 | 0 | 0 | 0 | 10 | 1 | 0 |
| 2017 | Rebels | 9 | 8 | 1 | 0 | 0 | 0 | 0 | 0 | 1 | 0 |
| 2018 | Rebels | 12 | 6 | 6 | 0 | 0 | 0 | 0 | 0 | 0 | 0 |
| Career | | 69 | 46 | 23 | 6 | 0 | 0 | 0 | 30 | 2 | 0 |

as of 15 July 2018
