= Micky Young =

English rugby union player

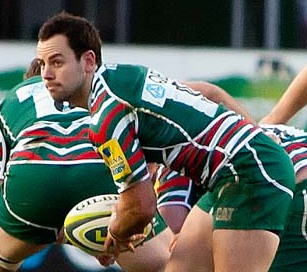
- Born: Michael Young; 31 December 1988 (age 37) Hartlepool, England
- Height: 1.75 m (5 ft 9 in)
- Weight: 84 kg (13 st 3 lb)
- School: Brierton Comprehensive; Durham School
- University: Northumbria University

Rugby union career
Amateur team(s)
Years	Team	Apps	(Points)
- West Hartlepool R.F.C.
Senior career
Years	Team	Apps	(Points)
2008–2011	Newcastle Falcons	79	(50)
2011–2013	Leicester Tigers	20	(0)
2013–2015	Bath	34	(25)
2015–2023	Newcastle Falcons	74	(50)
2023	Toulon		
2023	Gloucester		
- Correct as of 19 May 2019
International career
Years	Team	Apps	(Points)
2009–	England Saxons	2	(0)
National sevens team
Years	Team		Comps
2008	England		

Michael Young (born 31 December 1988) is an English Scrum half Rugby Union player for Gloucester in the Premiership Rugby. He is a product of West Hartlepool Rugby Club junior academy.

== Club career ==
He played for the Newcastle Falcons Middlesex Sevens side, helping them to the title in 2007. In 2008 he made his senior debut for the club, making 79 appearances in his three full seasons. Young moved to Leicester in 2011, remaining there until 2013 during which time Leicester won the premiership in 2013 and Anglo-Welsh Cup in 2012. In 2013 Young signed for Leicester's Premiership rival, Bath.

On 5 February 2015, it was announced Young had re-signed for Newcastle Falcons.

Young left Newcastle at the end of the 2022–23 Premiership season to join French side Toulon as a World Cup Joker. At the end of the World Cup, Young left Toulon and joined Premiership side Gloucester as injury cover.

== International career ==
Young has represented the England Sevens team, most notably in May 2009 when he scored the winning try against New Zealand in the final of the London Sevens tournament.

In June 2009 Young was selected for the England Saxons, scoring a try on his debut against the USA in the Churchill Cup. He also helped the Saxons to victory in the last Churchill Cup in 2011, coming off the bench in the final against Canada. In 2011 Young played for England in an uncapped match as a replacement against the Barbarians.

Young received his first call up to the senior England squad by coach Eddie Jones on 8 May 2016 for a three-day training squad.
