= Daniel Morath =

- Full name: Daniel Wayne Morath
- Born: 29 July 1980 (age 46) New Zealand
- Height: 6 ft 0 in (183 cm)
- Weight: 205 lb (93 kg)
- School: Hamilton Boys' High School
- Notable relative: Kurt Morath (brother)
- Occupation: PE teacher

Rugby union career
- Position: Halfback
Provincial / State sides
Years	Team	Apps	(Points)
2006–07	Poverty Bay	17	(10)
International career
Years	Team	Apps	(Points)
2010–11	Tonga	3	(0)

Daniel Wayne Morath (born 29 July 1980) is a New Zealand-born Tongan former international rugby union player.

Morath is the elder brother of Tonga first five-eighth Kurt Morath and attended Hamilton Boys' High School.

A halfback, Morath was a New Zealand Heartland XV representative in 2006 and played two seasons of provincial rugby with Poverty Bay. He is of Tongan descent through his mother (from Vavaʻu) and was capped three times for the Tonga national team across the 2010 and 2011 Pacific Nations Cups.

Morath is the director of rugby at Liston College.

== See also ==
- List of Tonga national rugby union players
