= Jaoji Dakuvula =

- Born: 30 October 1987 (age 39) Savusavu, Fiji
- Height: 6 ft 2 in (188 cm)
- Weight: 191 lb (87 kg)
- School: Ratu Kadavulevu School

Rugby union career
- Position: Fullback
International career
| Years | Team | Apps | (Points) |
| 2010 | Fiji | 1 | (7) |

Jaoji Dakuvula (born 30 October 1987) is a Fijian former international rugby union player.

Dakuvula was born in Savusavu and educated at Ratu Kadavulevu School.

A Lautoka fullback, Dakuvula was a member of the Fiji Barbarians side that reached the final of the 2010 Pacific Rugby Cup competition. He then gained his solitary Fiji cap as one of nine changes for a match against Japan at Churchill Park, coming into the starting XV in place of fullback Taniela Rawaqa. Handed the goal-kicking duties, Dakuvula secured seven points in a 22–8 win, with two conversions and a penalty.

== See also ==
- List of Fiji national rugby union players
