= Ropate Ratu =

Fijian rugby union footballer (born 1985)

- Born: Ropate Ratu; 1 March 1985 (age 41) Lautoka, Fiji
- Height: 1.85 m (6 ft 1 in)
- Weight: 91 kg (14 st 5 lb)

Rugby union career
- Position: Wing/Centre
- Current team: Fiji Barbarians
International career
Years	Team	Apps	(Points)
–	Fiji		
- Correct as of 31 May 2010

Ropate Ratu (born 1 March 1985 in Lautoka, Fiji) is a Fijian rugby union footballer. He plays as in both the Wing and Centre positions.

Ratu is from Yasawa. His debut for the Fiji national side was in June 2009 against Samoa. In 2010 he joined the Fiji Warriors for the 2010 Pacific Rugby Cup.
