= Alipate Fatafehi =

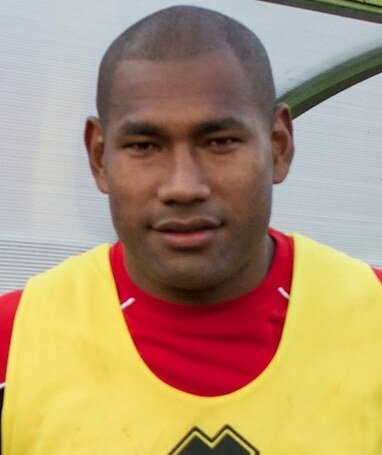
- Born: Alipate Fatafehi; 13 December 1984 (age 41) Sigatoka, Fiji
- Height: 6 ft 3 in (1.91 m)
- Weight: 106 kg (234 lb)

Rugby union career
- Position(s): Wing, Centre, Fullback
Senior career
Years	Team	Apps	(Points)
2010-11	CA Saint-Étienne	18	(10)
2011-2014	Lyon OU	35	(15)
2014-2015	US Colomiers	10	(5)
2015-2016	RC Strasbourg	13	(15)
Provincial / State sides
Years	Team	Apps	(Points)
2006-2008	Otago	6	(5)
2008-2009	Western Province	1	(0)
2010-2011	North Harbour	8	(5)
International career
Years	Team	Apps	(Points)
2009	Tonga	11	(20)
National sevens team
Years	Team		Comps
2005-2008	Tonga		

Alipate Fatafehi (born 13 December 1984) is a Tongan rugby union player who plays for Lyon OU in the Top 14 and the Tonga national team. Fatafehi first played professional rugby for Otago in New Zealand from 2006 to 2008 but failed to secure a regular spot in the team, dropping down to the North Otago side for two games in 2008 before gaining a spot in the team for Otago's last game of 2008. His primary position is on the wing, although he played at fullback for Otago and more recently in line with global trends, has been used as a centre because of his size.

== Stormers ==
After finishing his season in 2008 he was called over to South Africa to have a trial with the Super Rugby franchise the Stormers. In his first match against the Boland Cavaliers he started on the left wing, playing well before sent to the sin bin for a dangerous tackle. After much promise he failed to be selected for the Super 14 squad for the 2009 Super 14 season, but signed a contract with the Western Province to play in the 2009 Vodacom Cup.

== North Harbour ==
In 2010, Fatafehi played for North Harbour in the 2010 Air New Zealand Cup. Despite playing a big role in the team's 2010 season, he was unable to secure a Super Rugby contract at the end of the season.

== CA Saint-Étienne ==
In late 2010, Fatafehi signed with French club CA Saint-Étienne for the French 2010-11 Rugby Pro D2 season.

== Tonga ==
Fatafehi has also been a member of the Tonga Sevens team. He competed for Tonga at the 2011 Rugby World Cup.
