= Martin Underwood =

England international rugby union player

- Full name: Adrian Martin Underwood
- Born: 19 July 1940 Kidderminster, Worcestershire
- Died: 9 June 2017 (aged 76)

Rugby union career
- Position: Centre / Wing
International career
| Years | Team | Apps | (Points) |
| 1962–64 | England | 5 | (0) |

Adrian Martin Underwood (19 July 1940 - 9 June 2017) was an English rugby union international.

Underwood, the son of a farm labourer, was born and raised in Worcestershire, attending the King Charles I School in Kidderminster for his secondary education. He played his rugby union as a three quarter and was capped five times for England, primarily as a winger. While a Northampton player, he appeared in all of England's 1962 Five Nations Championship matches, then gained a further cap in 1964 after crossing to Exeter. He retired at the age of 23 due to injury and post rugby was a long serving physical education lecturer at St Luke's College Exeter.

== See also ==
- List of England national rugby union players
