= Gavin Williams (rugby union) =

Samoa international rugby union player

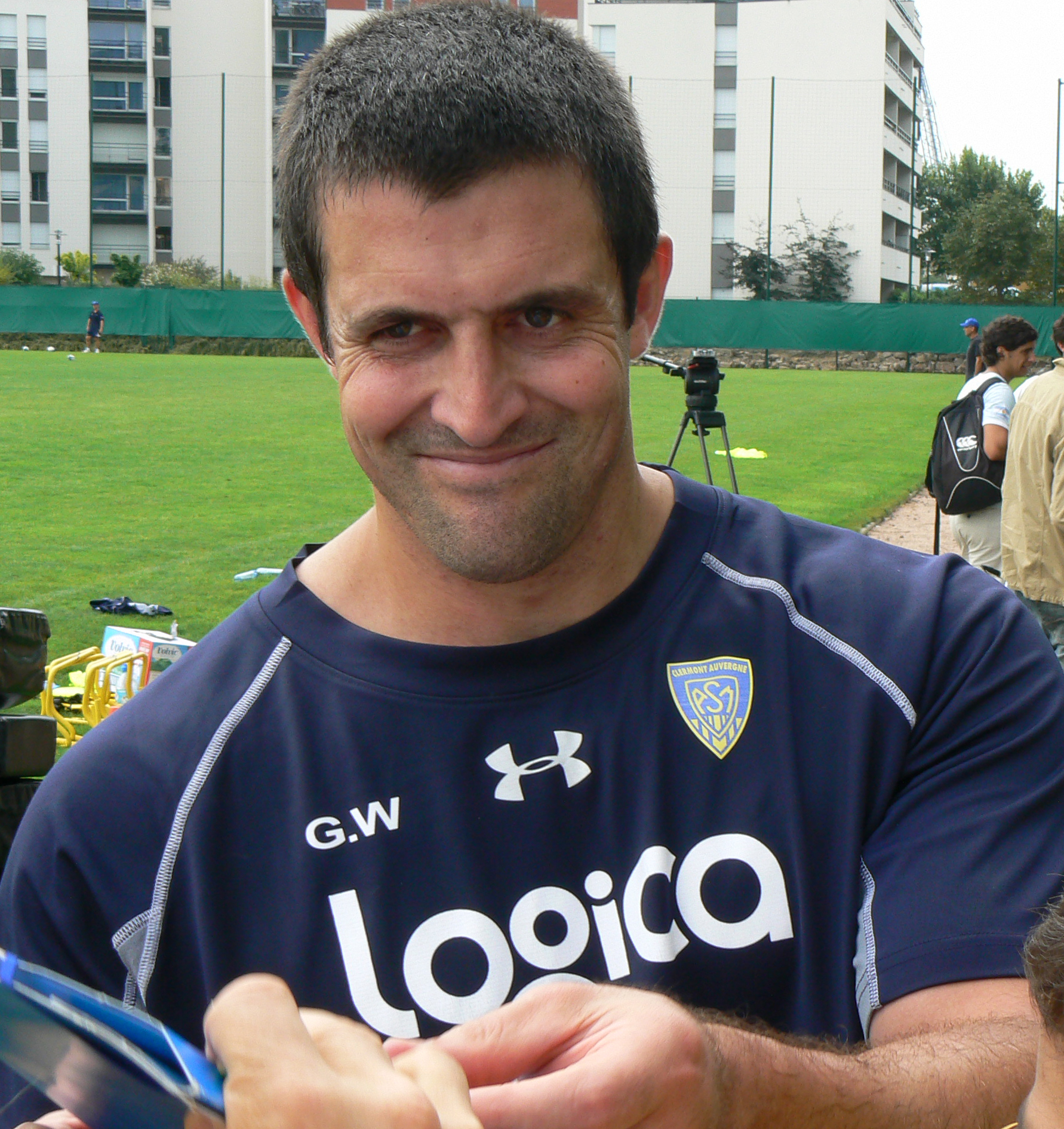
- Williams in 2010
- Born: Gavin Williams; 25 October 1979 (age 47) Auckland, New Zealand
- Height: 1.87 m (6 ft 2 in)
- Weight: 98 kg (15 st 6 lb)
- School: Mount Albert Grammar School
- Notable relative(s): Bryan Williams (father); Paul Williams (brother)

Rugby union career
- Position(s): Centre, fullback
Amateur team(s)
Years	Team	Apps	(Points)
- Ponsonby
Senior career
Years	Team	Apps	(Points)
2005–2007	Connacht	28	(15)
2007–2009	US Dax	51	(50)
2009–2013	Clermont Auvergne	39	(59)
2013	Stade Français Paris	4	(5)
2013–2015	Montluçon	31	(25)
- Correct as of 26 April 2015
Provincial / State sides
Years	Team	Apps	(Points)
2004	Southland	4	(0)
2005	Auckland	2	(0)
- Correct as of 24 September 2005
International career
Years	Team	Apps	(Points)
2007–2010	Samoa	16	(106)
2008	Pacific Islanders	2	(0)
- Correct as of 24 November 2011

Gavin Williams (born 25 October 1979) is a former rugby union player from New Zealand, who played in the Top 14 and for Samoa internationally.

== Career ==
Williams previously played for Connacht, where he played from 2005 until the end of the 2006–07 season. After leaving Connacht, he went on to make his debut for Samoa in 2007 in a match against Fiji. Williams scored a try and conversion in Samoa's opening game in the 2007 World Cup.

After leaving Connacht, he played for US Dax before signing for Clermont.

== Personal life ==
Williams has a strong family connection in rugby with his father Bryan Williams, a strong winger who played for Auckland and New Zealand, and brother Paul Williams, who has represented the Crusaders, Highlanders and Blues in Super Rugby, and who also plays for Samoa internationally.
