= Sione Timani =

Tonga international rugby union player (born 1984)

- Born: 3 September 1984 (age 42) Navutoka, Tonga
- Height: 2.03 m (6 ft 8 in)
- Weight: 123 kg (19 st 5 lb)

Rugby union career
- Position: Lock
Senior career
Years	Team	Apps	(Points)
2009-2011	Scarlets	56	(5)
2014-16	Tarbes	46	(0)
2016-	Colomiers	21	(0)
International career
Years	Team	Apps	(Points)
2008-	Tonga	7	(0)

Sione Timani (born 3 September 1984) is a Tongan rugby union football player at Lock for Tarbes, before joining Colomiers at the start of the 2016/17 season. He is 6 feet 6 inches (1.98 m) and 18 stone 13 pounds (120 kg).

Timani played for Carmarthen Quins between 2009 and 2011, before signing for the Scarlets. After 3 seasons there, he moved to play for Tarbes in the Pro D2. On 23 February 2016, it was confirmed that Timani would join Colomiers. He has 7 caps for Tonga. Sione has two brothers playing professional rugby in Australia, Sitaleki and Lopeti.
