= Kurt Morath =

Tonga international rugby union player

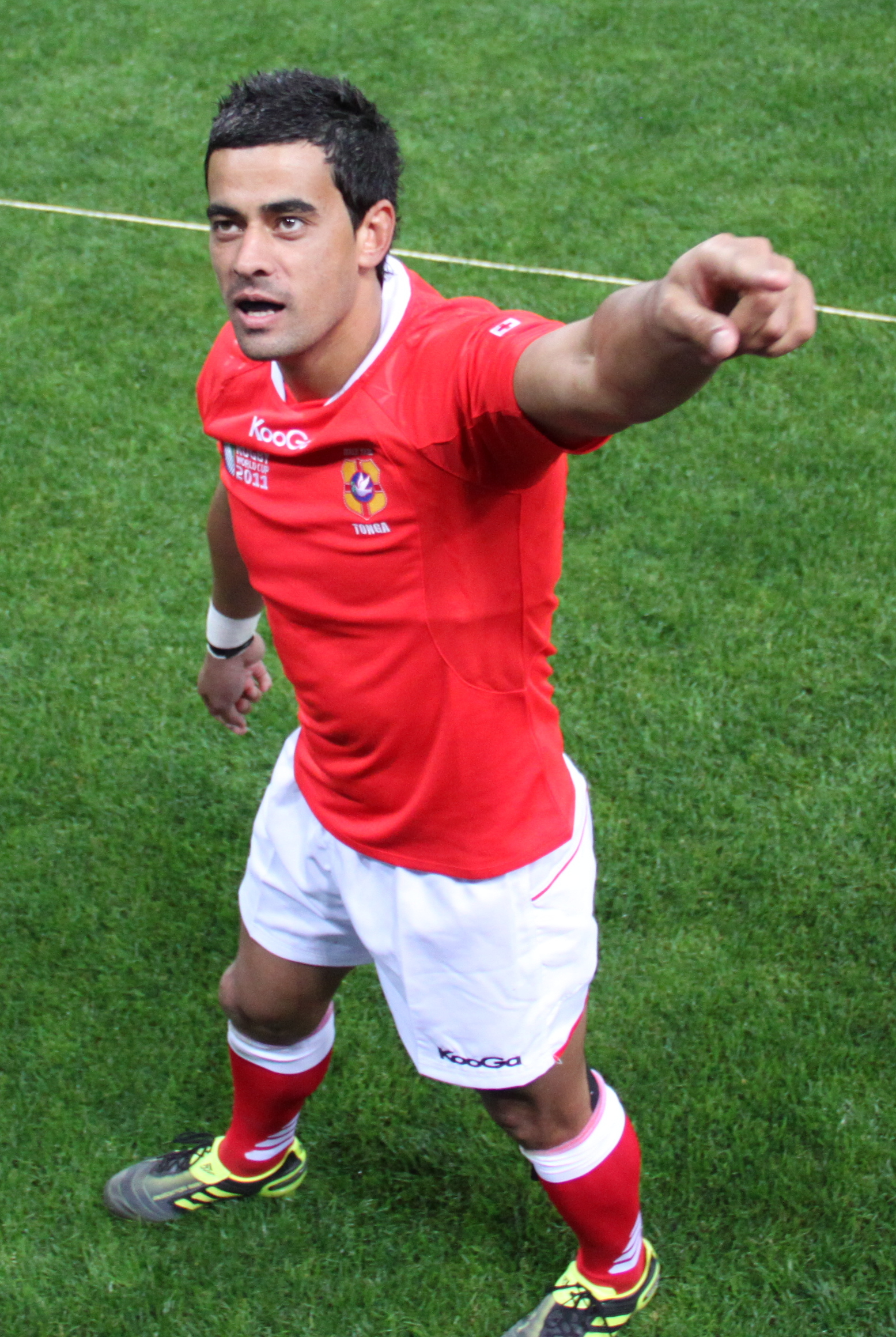
- Born: 13 November 1984 (age 42) Takapuna, New Zealand
- Height: 5 ft 11 in (1.80 m)
- Weight: 198 lb (90 kg)
- School: Hamilton Boys' High School

Rugby union career
- Position: Fly-half
- Current team: Austin Gilgronis
Amateur team(s)
Years	Team	Apps	(Points)
2008-09	Ciencias Sevilla		
2009-10	Clonakilty RFC		
Senior career
Years	Team	Apps	(Points)
2013-14	Kubota Spears	0	(0)
2014-15	Biarritz	12	(9)
2015-2016	San Diego Breakers	11	(122)
2017-2018	Utah Warriors	6	(49)
2018-19	Doncaster Knights	13	(63)
2020-	Austin Gilgronis	15	(34)
- Correct as of 2 November 2018
Provincial / State sides
Years	Team	Apps	(Points)
2006	Auckland	0	(0)
2006−07	Taranaki	5	(49)
International career
Years	Team	Apps	(Points)
2009–	Tonga	37	(340)
- Correct as of 12 July 2021

Kurt Morath (born 13 November 1984) is a New Zealand-born Tongan rugby union player who plays at fly-half. He currently plays for the Austin Gilgronis in Major League Rugby (MLR).

He previously played for Doncaster Knights in RFU Championship Morath was part of the Tonga squad at the 2011, 2015 and 2019 Rugby World Cup.

== Early life ==
Morath was born in North Shore City, New Zealand. As a junior he played rugby league alongside former New Zealand Warriors five eighth Lance Hohaia. In 2005, Morath was selected in the New Zealand Under-21 extended squad alongside other notable New Zealand players such as Andrew Ellis.

== Professional career ==
In early 2016, Morath signed to the San Diego Breakers in the newly formed PRO Rugby competition.

At the start of the 2018-19 rugby season, he signed for Doncaster Knights in the English Championship, after playing for the Utah Warriors of Major League Rugby in the 2018 season. He then returned to the MLR to play for the Austin Gilgronis in 2020.
