= List of Sri Lanka national rugby union team results =

This is a list of matches and results of the Sri Lanka national rugby union team. In Reverse Chronological Order:

(Except for tournaments which follow tournament progress).

== Overall Record ==
Sri Lankan Test record against all nations:

Team	Region	Span	Mat	Won	Lost	Draw	%	For	Against	Diff
Arabian Gulf	Asia	2003-2007	2	0	2	0	0.00	36	100	-64
British & Irish Lions	Europe	1950	1	0	1	0	0.00	6	44	-38
China	Asia	1998-2007	6	5	1	0	83.33	152	79	+73
Chinese Taipei	Asia	1990-2013	11	4	7	0	36.36	251	285	-34
England	Europe	1971	2	0	2	0	0.00	17	74	-57
Hong Kong	Asia	1980-2011	7	0	7	0	0.00	68	308	-240
India	Asia	2002-2004	2	2	0	0	100.00	108	32	+76
Japan	Asia	1972-2011	10	0	10	0	0.00	59	792	-733
Kazakhstan	Asia	2002-2013	8	2	6	0	25.00	163	241	-78
South Korea	Asia	1972-2002	8	0	8	0	0.00	56	432	-376
Laos	Asia	1974	1	1	0	0	100.00	39	3	+36
Madagascar	Africa	2013	1	0	1	0	0.00	12	17	-5
Malaysia	Asia	1972-2007	15	11	4	0	73.33	402	176	+226
New Zealand	Oceania	1907	1	0	1	0	0.00	6	33	-27
New Zealand Maori	Oceania	1926	1	0	1	0	0.00	6	37	-31
Pakistan	Asia	2004	1	1	0	0	100.00	75	3	+72
Papua New Guinea	Oceania	1992	2	0	2	0	0.00	35	46	-11
Philippines	Asia	2012	1	0	1	0	0.00	18	28	-10
Poland	Europe	2013	1	1	0	0	100.00	26	25	1
Singapore	Asia	1972-2012	12	7	4	1	58.33	211	155	+56
Thailand	Asia	1970-2013	14	9	4	1	64.28	398	290	+108
United Arab Emirates	Asia	2011	1	0	0	1	0.00	13	13	0
Total: 22	4	1907-2013	108	43	62	3	39.81	2157	3207	-1050

== 2010s ==
=== 2013 ===
Results

2013 Serendib International Cup

Sri Lanka v Poland

1 November 2013
19:30 SLST (UTC+5:30)

Sri Lanka	26–25	Poland
Try: Niroshan Fernando (2) 37' c, 56' c Con: Riza Mubarak (2/2) 36', 57'; Pen: Riza Mubarak (3/5) 21', 34', 52'; Drop: Riza Mubarak 61'	Report	Try: Craig Bachurzewski 18' c Robert Pawelec 31' m Tomasz Sirocili 77' c Con: Dawid Banaszek (2/3) 18', 78'; Pen: Dawid Banaszek (2/4) 27', 50',

Colombo Racecourse, Colombo
Referee: (Japan) Taku Otsuki (JRFU)

Sri Lanka
FB	15	Riza Mubarak
RW	14	Sandun Herath
OC	13	Lee Keegal
IC	12	Lavanga Perera
LW	11	Chamara Dabare
FH	10	Nigel Rathwatta
SH	9	Srinath Sooriyabandara
N8	8	Sajith Saranga
OF	7	Sharo Fernando
BF	6	Rohitha Rajapaksa
RL	5	Jason Dissanayake
LL	4	Sathya Ranatunga
TP	3	Eranga Swarnathilake
HK	2	Namal Rajapaksa (c)
LP	1	Henry Terance
Substitutes:
HK	16	Bilal Hassan
FH	17	Niroshan Fernando
HK	18	N. A. Jayalal
FL	19	Ishan Noor
FL	20	Danushka Perera
SH	21	Kavindu de Costa
FH	22	Dave Anand
FB	23	Nuwan Hettiarachchi
Coach:
(Sri Lanka) Ronnie Ibrahim

Poland
FB	15
RW	14
OC	13
IC	12
LW	11
FH	10	(c)
SH	9
N8	8
OF	7
BF	6
RL	5
LL	4
TP	3
HK	2
LP	1
Replacements:
HK	16
PR	17
PR	18
LK	19
FL	20
SH	21
FH	22
CE	23
Coach:
(Poland) Tomasz Putra

Touch judges:

Notes:

- This was the first official test match between the two nations.
- This was the third official test match between Sri Lanka and a European team.

Sri Lanka v Madagascar

26 October 2013
17:30 SLST (UTC+5:30)

Sri Lanka	12–17	Madagascar
Pen: Riza Mubarak (4/6) 5', 26', 31', 74'	Report	Try: Alain Rakotonirina 19' m Bernard Razafindranaivo 55' c Ratsimba Tolotra Ramaromiantso 79' m Con: José Rakoto (1/3) 56'

Colombo Racecourse, Colombo
Referee: (Japan) Taku Otsuki (JRFU)

FB	15	Riza Mubarak (vc)
RW	14
OC	13
IC	12
LW	11
FH	10	Niroshan Fernando
SH	9
N8	8
OF	7
BF	6
RL	5
LL	4
TP	3
HK	2	Namal Rajapaksa (c)
LP	1
Substitutes:
HK	16	Bilal Hassan
PR	17
PR	18
LK	19
FL	20
SH	21
FH	22
CE	23
Coach:
(Sri Lanka) Ronnie Ibrahim

FB	15	Bernard Razafindrananaivo
RW	14	Benjaniaina Rakotoarivelo
OC	13	Rakota Harison
IC	12
LW	11	Alain Rakotonirina
FH	10	José Rakoto (vc)
SH	9	Nirin Jacky
N8	8
OF	7
BF	6
RL	5	Maminandrasana Solomampiona
LL	4
TP	3	Christian Jean Felix
HK	2
LP	1
Substitutes:
HK	16
PR	17
PR	18
LK	19
FL	20
SH	21
FH	22
CE	23
Coach:
(Madagascar) Bertin Rafalimanana

Touch judges:

Notes:

- This was the first official test match between the two nations.
- This was the first official test match between Sri Lanka and an African team.

2013 HSBC Asian Five Nations

Sri Lanka v Kazakhstan

6 April 2013
16:00

Sri Lanka	49–18	Kazakhstan
Try: Sandun Herath 4'; Shenal Dias 26'; Pradeep Liyanage 40'; Sathya Ranathunga 41'; Fazil Marija 49'; Chamara Dabare 56'; Con: Rizah Mubarak (5/6); Pen: Rizah Mubarak 7' 20' 38'	Report; Full Match	Try: Daulet Akymbekov 62'; Alexandr Zolotukhin 69'; Con: Maxim Lifontov (1/2); Pen: Maxim Lifontov 3' 34'

Havelock Park, Colombo
Attendance: 5,300
Referee: (Japan) Taku Otsuki

FB	15	Rizah Mubarak	(substituted off) 70'
RW	14	Sandun Herath
OC	13	Pradeep Liyanage
IC	12	Gayan Weeraratne	(substituted off) 59'
LW	11	Chamara Dabare
FH	10	Fazil Marija (vc)	(substituted off) 75'
SH	9	Roshan Weeraratne
N8	8	Sajith Saranga
OF	7	Yoshitha Rajapaksha (c)
BF	6	Sharo Fernando	(substituted off) 70'
RL	5	Hasitha Perera	(substituted off) 55'
LL	4	Shenal Dias
TP	3	Jehan Kishore	(substituted off) 55'
HK	2	Namal Rajapaksa	(substituted off) 59'
LP	1	Sathya Ranathunga	(substituted off) 75'
Substitutes:
HK	16	Dushmantha Priyadarshana	(substituted on) 75'
PR	17	Henry Terrance	(substituted on) 55'
PR	18	Anuranga Walpola	(substituted on) 59'
LK	19	Suhiru Anthony	(substituted on) 55'
FL	20	Mohamed Sheriff	(substituted on) 70'
SH	21	Rehan Weerakoon	(substituted on) 75'
FH	22	Dinusha Chathuranga	(substituted on) 59'
CE	23	Sumedha Malawana	(substituted on) 70'
Coach:
(South Africa) Ravin Du Plessis

FB	15	Maxim Lifontov
RW	14	Viktor Zolotukhin
OC	13	Alexandr Zaharov	(substituted off) 56'
IC	12	Ildar Abrazakov
LW	11	Pavel Stikhin	(substituted off) 56'
FH	10	Daulet Akymbekov
SH	9	Akhmetzhan Baratov
N8	8	Serek Zhanseitov (c)
OF	7	Maxim Pristinskiy	(substituted off) 40'
BF	6	Oleg Guselnikov
RL	5	Grigoriy Ivanchenko	(substituted off) 4' (substituted on) 12' (substituted off) 62'
LL	4	Andrey Medvedkin
TP	3	Vladimir Chernykh	(substituted off) 59'
HK	2	Pavel Sarychev	(substituted off) 56'
LP	1	Sergey Menshikov
Substitutes:
HK	16	Nikolay Belkin	(substituted on) 56'
PR	17	Azat Abbasov	(substituted on) 59' (yellow card) 65' to 75'
PR	18	Vladimir Baranov	(substituted on) 62'
LK	19	Alexandr Kireev
FL	20	Alexandr Polyakov	(substituted on) 4' (substituted off) 12' (substituted on) 40'
SH	21	Vadim Zuyev
FH	22	Dastan Suleimenov	(substituted on) 56'
CE	23	Alexandr Zolotukhin	(substituted on) 56'
Coach:
(Kazakhstan) Timur Mashurov

Touch judges:
(Japan) Taizo Hirabayashi
(Singapore) Aaron Littlewood
Sean Moore

Sri Lanka v Thailand

3 April 2013
16:00

Sri Lanka	45 – 7	Thailand
Try: Sandun Herath 24' 79'; Pradeep Liyanage 28' 60'; Chamara Dabare 30'; Roshan Weerarathne 44'; Con: Rizah Mubarak (3/6); Pen: Rizah Mubarak 11' 38' 40'	Report	Try: Pichit Yingcharoen 75'; Con: Warongkorn Khamkoet (1/1); Pen: Warongkorn Khamkoet (0/1)

Havelock Park, Colombo
Attendance: 4,800
Referee: (Hong Kong) Warren Needham

FB	15	Rizah Mubarak	(substituted off) 65'
RW	14	Sandun Herath
OC	13	Pradeep Liyanage
IC	12	Gayan Weeraratne	(substituted off) 61'
LW	11	Chamara Dabare
FH	10	Fazil Marija (vc)
SH	9	Roshan Weeraratne	(substituted off) 71'
N8	8	Sajith Saranga	(substituted off) 50'
OF	7	Yoshitha Rajapaksha (c)	(substituted off) 66'
BF	6	Sharo Fernando
RL	5	Hasitha Perera	(substituted off) 50'
LL	4	Shenal Dias
TP	3	Jehan Kishore	(substituted off) 29'
HK	2	Namal Rajapaksa
LP	1	Sathya Ranathunga	(substituted off) 65'
Substitutes:
HK	16	Dushmantha Priyadarshana	(substituted on) 65'
PR	17	Henry Terrance	(substituted on) 29'
PR	18	Anuranga Walpola	(substituted on) 66'
LK	19	Suhiru Anthony	(substituted on) 50'
FL	20	Mohamed Sheriff	(substituted on) 65'
SH	21	Rehan Weerakoon	(substituted on) 71'
FH	22	Dinusha Chathuranga	(substituted on) 61'
CE	23	Sumedha Malawana	(substituted on) 50'
Coach:
(South Africa) Ravin Du Plessis

FB	15	Warongkorn Khamkoet
RW	14	Topong Boonlon	(substituted off) 71'
OC	13	Kitti Wangkanai	(substituted off) 32'
IC	12	Sirichai Daothaisong
LW	11	Pichit Yingcharoen
FH	10	Thanawatr Jamkrajang
SH	9	Punyavee Jiworrawattanakul
N8	8	Chatree Wannadit (c)	(substituted off) 66'
OF	7	Sumet Thammapom
BF	6	Richard Perkins
RL	5	Chaninthorn Banluesup	(substituted off) 50'
LL	4	Marc Dimitrov
TP	3	Pongpat Mekpat	(substituted off) 65'
HK	2	Chawiatt Klongtroujrok	(substituted off) 37'
LP	1	Napat Prompataya
Substitutes:
HK	16	Chatchai Akkhanimart	(substituted on) 65'
PR	17	Robert James	(substituted on) 66'
PR	18	Pachara Hongsayaporn	(substituted on) 50'
LK	19	Natthadol Sophawachirarit	(substituted on) 37'
FL	20	Pramote Ratchatanantakit	(substituted on) 71'
SH	21	Klin Laksanasompong
FH	22	Nirunlert Rungrangsritaweesuk	(substituted on) 32'
CE	23	Khomchak Chakrabandu Na Ayudhaya
Coach:
(Thailand) Tanyavit Kuasint

Touch judges:
(Japan) Taku Otsuki
(Sri Lanka) Priyantha Gunarathna
Sean Moore

Sri Lanka v Chinese Taipei

31 March 2013
16:00

Sri Lanka	39–8	Chinese Taipei
Try: Chamara Dabare 42'; Yoshitha Rajapakse 50'; Fazil Marija 55' 61'; Sumedha Malawana 66'; Con: Rizah Mubarak (3/4); Roshan Weeraratne (1/1); Pen: Rizah Mubarak 24' 34'	Report	Try: Ming Che Chuang 76'; Pen: Chih-Pan Wang 42'

Havelock Park, Colombo
Attendance: 4,800
Referee: (Hong Kong) Nicholas Long

FB	15	Rizah Mubarak	(substituted off) 64'
RW	14	Sandun Herath
OC	13	Pradeep Liyanage
IC	12	Gayan Weerarathne	(substituted off) 57'
LW	11	Chamara Dabare
FH	10	Fazil Marija (vc)
SH	9	Roshan Weerarathne	(substituted off) 69'
N8	8	Sajith Saranga
OF	7	Yoshitha Rajapaksha (c)
BF	6	Sharo Fernando	(substituted off) 63'
RL	5	Dinesh Sanjeewa	(substituted off) 40'
LL	4	Shenal Dias
TP	3	Kishor Jehan	(substituted off) 46'
HK	2	Namal Rajapaksa	(substituted off) 52'
LP	1	Henry Terence
Substitutes:
HK	16	Sathya Ranathunga	(substituted on) 46' (yellow card) 74' to end'
PR	17	Dushmantha Priyadarshana
PR	18	Anuranga Walpola	(substituted on) 52'
LK	19	Suhiru Anthony	(substituted on) 40'
FL	20	Sumedha Malewana	(substituted on) 63'
SH	21	Rehaan Weerakoon	(substituted on) 69'
FH	22	Dinusha Chathuranga	(substituted on) 57'
CE	23	Mohamed Sheriff	(substituted on) 64'
Coach:
(South Africa) Ravin Du Plessis

FB	15	Ming Hsien Ho
RW	14	Chih-Kang Chen
OC	13	Wei Fan Lu (c)	(substituted off) 53'
IC	12	Ching Che Hung
LW	11	Wu Hsien Lo	(substituted off) 63'
FH	10	Chih-Pan Wang	(substituted off) 48'
SH	9	Chia Han Chen	(substituted off) 48'
N8	8	Pin Yi Hsieh
OF	7	Cheng Hsien Chiang
BF	6	Kuo Lun Chen	(substituted off) 53'
RL	5	Chieh Yu Chiang
LL	4	Wei Ming Lin	(substituted off) 28'
TP	3	Wen Hao Chuan	(substituted off) 29'
HK	2	Po Yao Chuang	(substituted off) 63'
LP	1	Tai Ting Yeh
Substitutes:
HK	16	Po Wen Cheng	(substituted on) 29'
PR	17	Min-Ching Chiu	(substituted on) 63'
PR	18	Ming Che Chuang	(substituted on) 28'
LK	19	Ta Cheng Liu	(substituted on) 53'
FL	20	Chia-Wang Lee	(substituted on) 48'
SH	21	Po-Yen Chou	(substituted on) 53'
FH	22	Hsiu Fu Sun	(substituted on) 63'
CE	23	Chih-Hsiang Pan	(substituted on) 48'
Coach:

Touch judges:
(Singapore) Aaron Littlewood
(Sri Lanka) Mohamed Cader
Sean Moore

=== 2012 ===
Results

2012 HSBC Asian Five Nations

Sri Lanka v Philippines

21 April 2012
17:00

Philippines	28 – 18	Sri Lanka
	Report

Rizal Memorial Stadium, Manila
Referee: Taizo Hirabayashi (Japan)

Notes:

- This was the first official test match between the two nations.

Sri Lanka v Singapore

18 April 2012
17:00

Sri Lanka	35 – 10	Singapore
	Report

Rizal Memorial Stadium, Manila
Referee: Dewi Rowlands (Hong Kong)

Sri Lanka v Chinese Taipei

15 April 2012
17:00

Sri Lanka	36 – 8	Chinese Taipei
	Report

Rizal Memorial Stadium, Manila
Referee: Warren Needham (Hong Kong)

=== 2011 ===
Results

2011 HSBC Asian Five Nations

Sri Lanka v Japan

21 May 2011
16:00 SLST

Sri Lanka	13–90	Japan
Try: Nuwan Hettiarachchi 10'; Con: Saliya Kumara 10' (1/1); Pen: Roshan Weeraratne 39' (1/1); Nuwan Hettiarachchi 68'	report	Try: Takehisa Usuzuki 7'; Toetuu Taufa 22'; Alisi Tupuailei 28', 43', 63', 72'; Fumiaki Tanaka 32', 39'; Takashi Kikutani 35', 50'; Tanabe 66'; Hirotoki Onozawa 80'; Con: Shaun Webb 22', 32', 35 (3/5); Tanabe 39', 43', 63', 66', 72'(5/5)

CR & FC Grounds, Colombo
Referee: James Fitzgerald (UAE)

15	Saliya Kumara
14	Chula Susantha
13	Shabbir Mohamed
12	Fazil Marija
11	Nuwan Hettiarachchi
10	Chanaka Chandimal
9	Roshan Weeraratne
8	Keith Gurusinghe
7	Sajith Saranga
6	Sean Wijesinghe (c)
5	Dinesh Sanjeewa
4	Senaka Bandara
3	Kishore Jehan
2	Achala Perera
1	Henry Terrence
Substitutes:
16	Charith Seneviratne
17	Danushka Perera
18
19
20
21
22
Coach:
(New Zealand) Ellis Meachen

15	Tasaki Tanabe
14	Takehisa Usuzuki
13	Alisi Tupuailei
12	Yuta Imamura
11	Hirotoki Onozawa
10	Shaun Webb
9	Fumiaki Tanaka
8	Itaru Thangushi
7	Toetuu Taufa
6	Takashi Kikutani (c)
5	Luke Thompson
4	Hiroshi Ono
3	Nazomu Fujita
2	Hiroki Yuhara
1	Kersuke Hacheyama
Substitutes:
16
17
18
19
20
21
22
Coach:
(New Zealand) John Kirwan

Sri Lanka v Kazakhstan

14 May 2011
16:00

Kazakhstan	34–18	Sri Lanka
Try: dmitriy tkachenky 11' yevginiv shekurov 18'; Timur Mashurov 30', Daulet Akymbekov 68' pavel lenov 80'; Con: maxim lifontov (4/5) 18', 68', 80'; Pen: maxim lifontov (1/1) 70'	report	Try: lasintha costa (2) 10', 24'; Con: numon hettiarachchi (1/2) 24'; Pen: numon hettiarachchi (2/2) 9'; 62'

National University Stadium, Almaty

15
14
13
12
11
10
9
8
7
6
5
4
3
2
1
Substitutes:
16
17
18
19
20
21
22
Coach:
(Kazakhstan) Valeriy Popov

15	Saliya Kumara
14	Charith Seneviratne
13	Fazil Marija
12	Gayan Weeraratne
11	Nuwan Hettiarachchi
10	Chanaka Chandimal
9	Roshan Weeraratne
8	Keith Gurusinghe
7	Sean Wijesinghe (c)
6	Danushka Perera
5	Sajith Saranga
4	Senaka Bandara
3	Eranga Swarnatilleke
2	Achala Perera
1	Henry Terrence
Substitutes:
16	Kishore Jehan
17	Chula Susantha
18
19
20
21
22
Coach:
(New Zealand) Ellis Meachen

Sri Lanka v Hong Kong

7 May 2011
15:00 SLST

Sri Lanka	3–48	Hong Kong
Pen: Saliya Kumara (1/1)	report	Try: Keith Robertson 5', 78'; Lee Jones 12', 68'; Rowen Varty 34'; Alexander 65'; Pale Tauti 75'; Con: Keith Robertson (2/2); Tom McColl 68', 75', 78' (3/3); Pen: Keith Robertson 41' (1/1)

CR & FC Grounds, Colombo

15	Saliya Kumara
14	Lasintha de Costa
13	Gayan Weeraratne
12	Pradeep Liyanage
11	Nuwan Hettiarachchi
10	Fazil Marija (vc)
9	Roshan Weeraratne
8	Sean Wijesinghe (c)
7	Yoshitha Rajapaksa
6	Danushka Perera
5	Sajith Saranga
4	Senaka Bandara
3	Eranga Swarnatilleke
2	Achala Perera
1	Henry Terrance
Substitutes:
16	Charith Seneviratne
17	Kishore Jehan
18	Bilal Hassan
19	Sathya Ranatunga
20	Nishal Meepage
21	Keith Gurusinghe
22	Prasad Chathuranga
Coach:
(New Zealand) Ellis Meachen

15	Ross Armour
14	Rowen Varty
13	Lee Jones
12	Tom McColl (c)
11	Yui Ken Shing
10	Keith Robertson
9	Peter McKee
8	Pale Tauti
7	Nick Hewson
6	Mark Goosen
5	Renaud Chevans
4	Mike Waller
3	Nigel Hobbler
2	Brent Taylor
1	Alex Ng
Substitutes:
16	CHIK Man Hon
17	Pete Spizziri
18	Matthew Nuttall
19	Terence Montgomery
20	Tim Alexander
21	Jamie Hood
22	Alex McQueen
Coach:
(Wales) Dai Rees

Touch judges:

Sri Lanka v United Arab Emirates

23 April 2011
16:00 SLST

Sri Lanka	13–13	United Arab Emirates
Try: Swarnatilleke 45'; Hettiarachchi 66'; Con: Kumara (0/2); Pen: Hettiarachchi (1/2) 42'; Kumara (0/1)	report	Try: Dan Boatwright 54'; Steve Smith 62'; Pen: Jonathan Grady (1/2) 48'

CR & FC Grounds, Colombo
Attendance: 4,000+
Referee: Anthony Tobi Lothian

15	Saliya Kumara
14	Nuwan Hettiarachchi
13	Gayan Weeraratne
12	Pradeep Liyanage
11	Lasintha de Costa
10	Fazil Marija (vc)
9	Roshan Weeraratne
8	Sean Wijesinghe (c)
7	Danushka Perera
6	Sajith Saranga
5	Yoshitha Rajapaksa
4	Senaka Bandara
3	Eranga Swarnatilleke
2	Achala Perera
1	Henry Terrance
Substitutes:
16	Dinesh Sanjeewa
17	Ishan Noor
18	Bilal Hassan
19	Sathya Ranatunga
20	Nishal Meepage
21	Keith Gurusinghe
22	Prasad Chathuranga
Coach:
(New Zealand) Ellis Meachen

15	Tim Flether
14	Sean Hurley
13	Jonathan Beeton
12	Duncan Murray
11	Steve Smith
10	Jonathan Grady
9	Stuart Quinn
8	Scott Kerr
7	Carl Von Rosenveldt
6	Renier Els
5	Simon Osbourne
4	Mike Cox-Hill (c)
3	Dan Boatwright
2	Dan Heal
1	Chris Jones Griffiths
Substitutes:
16	Andrew Millar
17	David Clouston
18	David Vittes
19	Lloyd Budd
20	Ali Mohammad
21	Mohannad Saker
22	Stephan Imbert
Coach:
(New Zealand) Bruce Birtwistle

Notes:

- This was the first official test match between the two nations.
- This was the first official test match for the United Arab Emirates.

Touch judges:
(Hong Kong) Anthony Tobi Lothian
(Sri Lanka) D. Nimal

=== 2010 ===
Results

2010 HSBC Asian Five Nations

Sri Lanka v Singapore

17 April 2010

Singapore	16 – 23	Sri Lanka

Yio Chu Kang Stadium, Singapore

Sri Lanka v Chinese Taipei

14 April 2010
5:30 pm

Chinese Taipei	7 – 37	Sri Lanka

Yio Chu Kang Stadium, Singapore

== 2000s ==
=== 2009 ===
Results

2009 HSBC Asian Five Nations

Sri Lanka v Thailand

11 April 2009
3:00 pm

Sri Lanka	51 – 17	Thailand

The Sevens, Dubai, United Arab Emirates

Sri Lanka v Chinese Taipei

8 April 2009
3:00 pm

Chinese Taipei	36 – 24	Sri Lanka

The Sevens, Dubai, United Arab Emirates

=== 2008 ===
Results

2008 HSBC Asian Five Nations

Sri Lanka v Chinese Taipei

15 November 2008
3:00 pm

Chinese Taipei	35 – 23	Sri Lanka

Tainan Rugby Park, Taiwan

Sri Lanka v Singapore

11 November 2008
7:00 pm

Singapore	20 – 20	Sri Lanka

Tainan Rugby Park, Taiwan

=== 2007 ===
Results

2007 Rugby Asiad

Sri Lanka v Kazakhstan

10 November 2007

Kazakhstan	24 – 17	Sri Lanka

Longden Place, Colombo

Sri Lanka v Malaysia

7 November 2007

Sri Lanka	77 – 3	Malaysia

Longden Place, Colombo

Sri Lanka v China

3 November 2007

Sri Lanka	26 – 10	China

Longden Place, Colombo

2007 Asian Nations Series

Sri Lanka v Kazakhstan

8 May 2007

Kazakhstan	79 – 6	Sri Lanka

Tolkagogan

Sri Lanka v Arabian Gulf

27 April 2007

Arabian Gulf	52 – 11	Sri Lanka

Sharjah Wanderers Sports Club, UAE

=== 2006 ===
Results

2007 Rugby World Cup qualifying

Sri Lanka v Hong Kong

14 May 2006

Hong Kong	45 – 14	Sri Lanka

Hong Kong

Sri Lanka v China

29 April 2006

Sri Lanka	30 – 0	China

Colombo

=== 2005 ===
Results

2007 Rugby World Cup qualifying

Sri Lanka v Kazakhstan

12 November 2005

Sri Lanka	24 – 12	Kazakhstan

Longden Place, Colombo

Sri Lanka v Kazakhstan

25 October 2005

Kazakhstan	25 – 19	Sri Lanka

National Stadium, Almaty

Sri Lanka v Singapore

25 June 2005

Sri Lanka	34 – 17	Singapore

Longden Place, Colombo

Sri Lanka v Thailand

4 June 2005

Thailand	38 – 48	Sri Lanka

Suphanburi Stadium, Thailand

=== 2004 ===
Results

2004 ARFU Asian Rugby Championship

Sri Lanka v China

30 October 2004

Sri Lanka	16 – 30	China

King's Park, Hong Kong

Sri Lanka v Pakistan

27 October 2004

Sri Lanka	75 – 3	Pakistan

King's Park, Hong Kong

Internationals

Sri Lanka v Thailand

30 June 2004

Sri Lanka	35 – 14	Thailand

Colombo

Sri Lanka v India

22 June 2004

India	17 – 54	Sri Lanka

=== 2003 ===
Results

Sri Lanka v Hong Kong

11 October 2003

Sri Lanka	22 – 36	Hong Kong

Sri Lanka v Arabian Gulf

18 April 2003

Sri Lanka	25 – 48	Arabian Gulf

=== 2002 ===
Results

2002 ARFU Asian Rugby Championship

Sri Lanka v Malaysia

22 November 2002

Sri Lanka	54 – 18	Malaysia

Bangkok

Sri Lanka v India

20 November 2002

India	15 – 54	Sri Lanka

Bangkok

Sri Lanka v Thailand

18 November 2002

Thailand	72 – 0	Sri Lanka

Bangkok

Sri Lanka v Kazakhstan

16 November 2002

Kazakhstan	29 – 16	Sri Lanka

Bangkok

2002 Asian Games

Sri Lanka v Chinese Taipei

13 October 2002

Sri Lanka	18 – 56	Chinese Taipei

Ulsan Public Stadium, Ulsan

Sri Lanka v Japan

8 October 2002

Japan	129 – 6	Sri Lanka

Ulsan Public Stadium, Ulsan

Sri Lanka v Korea

5 October 2002

South Korea	70 – 11	Sri Lanka

Ulsan Public Stadium, Ulsan

2003 Rugby World Cup qualifying

Sri Lanka v Kazakhstan

21 April 2002

Kazakhstan	20 – 14	Sri Lanka

Almaty Central Stadium, Almaty

Sri Lanka v China

7 April 2002

Sri Lanka	9 – 7	China

Longden Place, Colombo

=== 2001 ===
Results

2001 ARFU Asian Rugby Championship

Sri Lanka v Thailand

20 May 2001

Sri Lanka	46 – 17	Thailand

Colombo

Sri Lanka v Malaysia

13 May 2001

Malaysia	18 – 7	Sri Lanka

Kuala Lumpur

=== 2000 ===
Results

2000 ARFU Asian Rugby Championship

Sri Lanka v Singapore

2 July 2000

Singapore	15 – 12	Sri Lanka

Aomori

Sri Lanka v China

28 June 2000

China	27 – 28	Sri Lanka

Aomori

Sri Lanka v Thailand

24 June 2000

Thailand	38 – 28	Sri Lanka

Aomori

== 1990s ==
=== 1999 ===
Results

Sri Lanka tour of Malaysia

Sri Lanka v Thailand

July 1999

Thailand	3 – 25	Sri Lanka

Malaysia

=== 1998 ===
Results

Rugby union at the 1998 Asian Games

Sri Lanka v Chinese Taipei

18 December 1998

Chinese Taipei	38 – 20	Sri Lanka

Bangkok

Sri Lanka v Japan

16 December 1998

Japan	116 – 20	Sri Lanka

Bangkok

Sri Lanka v Thailand

12 December 1998

Thailand	6 – 18	Sri Lanka

Bangkok

Sri Lanka v Korea

10 December 1998

South Korea	90 – 3	Sri Lanka

Bangkok

1998 ARFU Asian Rugby Championship

Sri Lanka v Singapore

31 October 1998

Singapore	25 – 13	Sri Lanka

Singapore

Sri Lanka v Malaysia

28 October 1998

Malaysia	3 – 44	Sri Lanka

Singapore

Sri Lanka v China

26 October 1998

China	5 – 43	Sri Lanka

Singapore

1999 Rugby World Cup qualifying

Sri Lanka v Chinese Taipei

17 January 1998

Chinese Taipei	31 – 27	Sri Lanka

Chulalongkorn Stadium, Bangkok

=== 1997 ===
Results

1999 Rugby World Cup qualifying

Sri Lanka v Malaysia

29 November 1997

Malaysia	15 – 37	Sri Lanka

Kuala Lumpur

1992 Sri Lanka tour Thailand

Sri Lanka v Malaysia

18 July 1997

Malaysia	10 – 24	Sri Lanka

Thailand

Sri Lanka v Singapore

16 July 1997

Singapore	15 – 17	Sri Lanka

Thailand

Sri Lanka v Thailand

14 July 1997

Thailand	13 – 32	Sri Lanka

Thailand

1999 Rugby World Cup qualifying

Sri Lanka v Singapore

30 March 1997

Singapore	15 – 18	Sri Lanka

Kuala Lumpur

Sri Lanka v Thailand

15 February 1997

Thailand	15 – 30	Sri Lanka

Bangkok

=== 1996 ===
Results

1996 ARFU Asian Rugby Championship

Sri Lanka v Malaysia

7 November 1996

Malaysia	6 – 31	Sri Lanka

Taipei

Sri Lanka v Hong Kong

5 November 1996

Hong Kong	66 – 13	Sri Lanka

Taipei

Sri Lanka v Korea

3 November 1996

South Korea	60 – 20	Sri Lanka

Taipei

=== 1995 ===
No 'A' Internationals played.

=== 1994 ===
Results

1994 ARFU Asian Rugby Championship & 1995 Rugby World Cup qualifying

Sri Lanka v Chinese Taipei

26 October 1994

Chinese Taipei	25 – 9	Sri Lanka

Kuala Lumpur Football Stadium, Kuala Lumpur

Sri Lanka v Japan

24 October 1994

Sri Lanka	3 – 67	Japan

Kuala Lumpur Football Stadium, Kuala Lumpur

Sri Lanka v Malaysia

22 October 1994

Malaysia	23 – 18	Sri Lanka

Kuala Lumpur Football Stadium, Kuala Lumpur

=== 1993 ===
No 'A' Internationals played.

=== 1992 ===
Results

1992 ARFU Asian Rugby Championship

Sri Lanka v Singapore

24 September 1992

Sri Lanka	15 – 0	Singapore

Hong Kong

Sri Lanka v Japan

22 September 1992

Japan	89 – 3	Sri Lanka

Hong Kong

Sri Lanka v Chinese Taipei

20 September 1992

Chinese Taipei	35 – 9	Sri Lanka

Hong Kong

Sri Lanka tour of Papua New Guinea

Sri Lanka v Papua New Guinea

Jul 1992

Papua New Guinea	24 – 21	Sri Lanka

Papua New Guinea

Sri Lanka v Papua New Guinea

Jul 1992

Papua New Guinea	22 – 14	Sri Lanka

Papua New Guinea

=== 1991 ===
No 'A' Internationals played.

=== 1990 ===
Results

1990 ARFU Asian Rugby Championship

Sri Lanka v Korea

24 October 1990

Sri Lanka	13 – 26	South Korea

Colombo

Sri Lanka v Chinese Taipei

22 October 1990

Sri Lanka	9 – 6	Chinese Taipei

Colombo

Sri Lanka v Hong Kong

20 October 1990

Sri Lanka	13 – 21	Hong Kong

Colombo

== 1980s ==
=== 1989 ===
No 'A' Internationals played.

=== 1988 ===
Results

1988 ARFU Asian Rugby Championship

Sri Lanka v Korea

16 November 1988

South Korea	68 – 6	Sri Lanka

Hong Kong

Sri Lanka v Malaysia

14 November 1988

Malaysia	6 – 12	Sri Lanka

Hong Kong

Sri Lanka v Hong Kong

12 November 1988

Hong Kong	45 – 3	Sri Lanka

Hong Kong

=== 1987 ===
No 'A' Internationals played.

=== 1986 ===
Results

1986 ARFU Asian Rugby Championship

Sri Lanka v Malaysia

25 November 1986

Malaysia	15 – 33	Sri Lanka

Bangkok

Sri Lanka v Japan

23 November 1986

Japan	64 – 0	Sri Lanka

Bangkok

=== 1985 ===
No 'A' Internationals played.

=== 1984 ===
Results

1984 ARFU Asian Rugby Championship

Sri Lanka v Malaysia

25 October 1984

Malaysia	12 – 14	Sri Lanka

Fukuoka

Sri Lanka v Thailand

23 October 1984

Thailand	9 – 6	Sri Lanka

Fukuoka

Sri Lanka v Korea

21 October 1984

South Korea	69 – 3	Sri Lanka

Fukuoka

=== 1983 ===
No 'A' Internationals played.

=== 1982 ===
Results

1982 ARFU Asian Rugby Championship

Sri Lanka v Korea

24 November 1982

South Korea	12 – 0	Sri Lanka

Singapore

Sri Lanka v Malaysia

22 November 1982

Malaysia	23 – 12	Sri Lanka

Singapore

Sri Lanka v Singapore

20 November 1982

Singapore	9 – 8	Sri Lanka

Singapore

=== 1981 ===
No 'A' Internationals played.

=== 1980 ===
Results

1980 ARFU Asian Rugby Championship

Sri Lanka v Malaysia

13 November 1980

Malaysia	9 – 4	Sri Lanka

Taipei

Sri Lanka v Japan

11 November 1980

Japan	108 – 0	Sri Lanka

Taipei

Sri Lanka v Hong Kong

9 November 1980

Hong Kong	47 – 0	Sri Lanka

Taipei

== 1970s ==
=== 1979 ===
No 'A' Internationals played.

=== 1978 ===
Results

1978 ARFU Asian Rugby Championship

Sri Lanka v Japan

23 November 1978

Japan	34 – 8	Sri Lanka

Kuala Lumpur

Sri Lanka v Thailand

19 November 1978

Thailand	23 – 16	Sri Lanka

Kuala Lumpur

=== 1977 ===
No 'A' Internationals played.

=== 1976 ===
No 'A' Internationals played.

=== 1975 ===
No 'A' Internationals played.

=== 1974 ===
Results

1974 ARFU Asian Rugby Championship

Sri Lanka v Japan

23 November 1974

Sri Lanka	6 – 44	Japan

Colombo

Sri Lanka v Malaysia

21 November 1974

Sri Lanka	12 – 6	Malaysia

Colombo

Sri Lanka v Laos

19 November 1974

Laos	3 – 39	Sri Lanka

Colombo

Sri Lanka v Singapore

17 November 1974

Sri Lanka	10 – 4	Singapore

Colombo

=== 1973 ===
No 'A' Internationals played.

=== 1972 ===
Results

1972 ARFU Asian Rugby Championship

Sri Lanka v Korea

11 November 1972

South Korea	37 – 0	Sri Lanka

Hong Kong

Sri Lanka v Singapore

8 November 1972

Singapore	9 – 6	Sri Lanka

Hong Kong

Sri Lanka v Japan

6 November 1972

Japan	51 – 0	Sri Lanka

Hong Kong

Sri Lanka v Malaysia

4 November 1972

Malaysia	9 – 23	Sri Lanka

Hong Kong

=== 1971 ===
Results

1971 England rugby union tour of Ceylon

Ceylon v England

8 October 1971

Ceylon	6 – 34	England

Colombo

Ceylon v England

6 October 1971

Ceylon	11 – 40	England

Colombo

=== 1970 ===
Results

1970 ARFU Asian Rugby Championship

Ceylon v Thailand

13 January 1970

Thailand	18 – 18	Ceylon

Bangkok

Notes:

- This was the first official test match between the two nations.

== 1960s ==
No 'A' Internationals played.

== 1950s ==
=== 1951 to 1959 ===
No 'A' Internationals played.

=== 1950 ===
Results

1950 British Lions tour to New Zealand and Australia

Ceylon v British and Irish Lions

18 September 1950

British & Irish Lions	44 – 6	Ceylon

Notes:

- This was the first official test match between the two nations.
- This was the first official test match between Ceylon and a European team.

== 1940s ==
No 'A' Internationals played.

== 1930s ==
No 'A' Internationals played.

== 1920s ==
=== 1927 to 1929 ===
No 'A' Internationals played.

=== 1926 ===
Results

1926–27 New Zealand Māori rugby union tour

Ceylon v New Zealand Maori

18 August 1926

New Zealand Maori	37 – 6	Ceylon

Colombo Racecourse, Colombo

Notes:

- This was the first official and only test match between the two teams.

=== 1920 to 1925 ===
No 'A' Internationals played.

== 1910s ==
No 'A' Internationals played.

== 1900s ==
=== 1907 ===
Results

1907–1908 New Zealand rugby tour of Australia and Great Britain

All Ceylon v New Zealand

12 September 1907
17:00

New Zealand	33 – 6	All Ceylon

Colombo Racecourse, Colombo
Attendance: 3,000

Notes:

- This was the first official test match between the two nations.
- This was the first official test match between Sri Lanka and an Oceanian team.
