= 2011 Asian Five Nations =

- Date: 23 April – 21 May 2011
- Countries: Hong Kong; Japan; Kazakhstan; Sri Lanka; United Arab Emirates

Final positions
- Champions: Japan (19th title)

Tournament statistics
- Matches played: 10
- Top scorer(s): (Kazakhstan) Maxim Lifontov (54)
- Most tries: (Japan) Kosuke Endo (8)
- Website: www.asian5nations.com

The 2011 Asian Five Nations, known as the 2011 HSBC Asian 5 Nations due to the tournament's sponsorship by the HSBC, was the 4th series of the Asian Five Nations rugby union tournament.

The 2011 Asian 5 nations consisted of the best 5 teams in Asia; Hong Kong, Japan, Kazakhstan, Sri Lanka and the United Arab Emirates.

Sri Lanka qualified for the 2011 edition of the tournament by winning Division One of the 2010 tournament against Singapore 23–16. The United Arab Emirates also qualify with the disbanding of the Arabian Gulf rugby team, this is the first time both these teams have appeared in the top five.

== Changes from 2010 ==
- South Korea has been replaced with Sri Lanka, who earns promotion from Division 1.

== Teams ==
The teams involved are:

Nation	Home stadium	City	Head coach	Captain
Hong Kong (37)	Hong Kong Football Club Stadium	Hong Kong	(Wales) Dai Rees	Tom McColl
Japan (13)	None	None	(New Zealand) John Kirwan	Takashi Kikutani
Kazakhstan (27)	National University Stadium	Almaty	(Kazakhstan) Valeriy Popov	Timur Mashurov
Sri Lanka (41)	CR & FC Grounds	Colombo	(New Zealand) Ellis Meachen	Sean Wijesinghe
United Arab Emirates (NR)	Zayed Sports City; The Sevens	Abu Dhabi; Dubai	(New Zealand) Bruce Birtwistle	Mike Cox-Hill

== Final Table ==
Rank	Nation	Games				Points			Bonus points	Total points
Rank	Nation	Played	Won	Lost	Drawn	For	Against	Diff	Bonus points	Total points
1	Japan	4	4	0	0	307	35	272	4	24
2	Hong Kong	4	3	1	0	155	61	94	3	18
3	United Arab Emirates	4	1	2	1	40	196	−156	0	8
4	Kazakhstan	4	1	3	0	54	126	−72	1	6
5	Sri Lanka	4	0	3	1	47	185	−138	0	3

Points are awarded to the teams as follows:

Results	Points
Win	5 points
Draw	3 points
4 or more tries	1 point
Loss within 7 points	1 point
Loss greater than 7 points	0 points

== Fixtures ==
=== Week 1 ===
23 April 2011
16:00 SLST

Sri Lanka	13–13	United Arab Emirates
Try: Swarnatilleke 45'; Hettiarachchi 66'; Con: Kumara (0/2); Pen: Hettiarachchi (1/2) 42'; Kumara (0/1)	Report	Try: Dan Boatwright 54'; Steve Smith 62'; Pen: Jonathan Grady (1/2) 48'

CR & FC Grounds, Colombo
Attendance: 4,000+
Referee: Anthony Tobi Lothian

FB	15	Saliya Kumara
RW	14	Nuwan Hettiarachchi
OC	13	Gayan Weeraratne
IC	12	Pradeep Liyanage
LW	11	Lasintha de Costa
FH	10	Fazil Marija (vc)
SH	9	Roshan Weeraratne
N8	8	Sean Wijesinghe (c)
OF	7	Danushka Perera
BF	6	Sajith Saranga
RL	5	Yoshitha Rajapaksa
LL	4	Senaka Bandara
TP	3	Eranga Swarnatilleke
HK	2	Achala Perera
LP	1	Henry Terrance
Substitutes:
	16	Dinesh Sanjeewa
	17	Ishan Noor
	18	Bilal Hassan
	19	Sathya Ranatunga
	20	Nishal Meepage
	21	Keith Gurusinghe
	22	Prasad Chathuranga
Coach:
(New Zealand) Ellis Meachen

FB	15	Tim Flether
RW	14	Sean Hurley
OC	13	Jonathan Beeton
IC	12	Duncan Murray
LW	11	Steve Smith
FH	10	Jonathan Grady
SH	9	Stuart Quinn
N8	8	Scott Kerr
OF	7	Carl Von Rosenveldt
BF	6	Renier Els
RL	5	Simon Osbourne
LL	4	Mike Cox-Hill (c)
TP	3	Dan Boatwright
HK	2	Dan Heal
LP	1	Chris Jones Griffiths
Substitutes:
	16	Andrew Millar
	17	David Clouston
	18	David Vittes
	19	Lloyd Budd
	20	Ali Mohammad
	21	Mohannad Saker
	22	Stephan Imbert
Coach:
(New Zealand) Bruce Birtwistle

Touch judges:
(Hong Kong) Anthony Tobi Lothian
(Sri Lanka) D. Nimal

23 April 2011
16:00

Kazakhstan	10–23	Hong Kong
Try: Evgeniy Shekurov 46'; Con: Ildar Abdrazakhov (1/1); Pen: Maxim Lifontov 16' (1/1)	Report	Try: Tom McColl 17'; Peter McKee 65'; Con: Keith Robertson (2/2)

National University Stadium, Almaty

=== Week 2 ===
29 April 2011
19:00

United Arab Emirates	24–10	Kazakhstan
Try: Munib Haddad 31'; Andrew Millar 70'; Con: Jonathon Grady(0/2); Pen: Jonathon Grady(4/4) 16', 18', 39', 46'	Report	Try: Sergey Konev 27'; Daulet Akymbekov 75'

Zayed Sports City, Abu Dhabi

30 April 2011
16:00

Hong Kong	22–45	Japan
Try: Mark Goosen 51'; Rowan Varty 25'; Alex McQueen 41'; Con: Tom McColl (2/2); Pen: Keith Robertson 38' (1/1)	Report	Try: Koliniasi Holani 11'; Shaun Webb 19'; Hirotoki Onozawa 32'; Alisi Tupuailei 42', 44', 45'; Michael Leitch 55'; Con: Ryan Nicholas (5/5)

Hong Kong Football Club Stadium, Hong Kong
Attendance: 3,800
Referee: Harry Mason (Singapore)

FB	15	Ross Armour
RW	14	Yui Ken Shing
OC	13	Tom McColl (c)
IC	12	Lee Jones
LW	11	Rowan Varty
FH	10	Keith Robertson
SH	9	Peter McKee
N8	8	Pale Tauti
OF	7	Mark Goosen
BF	6	Nick Hewson
RL	5	Michael Waller
LL	4	Renaud Chavanis
TP	3	Ng Wai Shing
HK	2	Alex Harris
LP	1	Andrew Li
Substitutes:
	16	Chik Man Hon
	17	Pete Spizziri
	18	Matthew Nuttall
	19	Terence Montgomery
	20	Tim Alexander
	21	Jamie Hood
	22	Alex McQueen
Coach:
(Wales) Dai Rees

FB	15	Taihei Ueda
RW	14	Alisi Tupuailei
OC	13	Koji Taira
IC	12	Ryan Nicholas
LW	11	Hirotoki Onozawa
FH	10	Shaun Webb
SH	9	Atsushi Hiwasa
N8	8	Koliniasi Holani
OF	7	Michael Leitch
BF	6	Takashi Kikutani (c)
RL	5	Toshizumi Kitagawa
LL	4	Justin Ives
TP	3	Nozomu Fujita
HK	2	Hiroki Yuhara
LP	1	Naoki Kawamata
Substitutes:
	16	Takeshi Kizu
	17	Kensuke Hatakeyama
	18	Luke Thompson
	19	Toetuu Taufa
	20	Fumiaki Tanaka
	21	James Arlidge
	22	Yuta Imamura
Coach:
(New Zealand) John Kirwan

Touch judges:

=== Week 3 ===
7 May 2011
19:00

Kazakhstan	0–61	Japan
	Report	Try: Justin Ives 7'; Takeshi Kizu 3', 29', 47', 66'; Goshi Tachikawa 51; Koji Taira 38' Atsushi Tanabe 71'; Alisi Tupuailei 79'; Con: Atsushi Tanabe (4/4); Shaun Webb (4/4)

National Stadium, Bangkok
Referee: Mohammad Yusof (Singapore)

7 May 2011
15:00 SLST

Sri Lanka	3–48	Hong Kong
Pen: Saliya Kumara (1/1)	Report	Try: Keith Robertson 5', 78'; Lee Jones 12', 68'; Rowen Varty 34'; Alexander 65'; Pale Tauti 75'; Con: Keith Robertson (2/2); Tom McColl 68', 75', 78' (3/3); Pen: Keith Robertson 41' (1/1)

CR & FC Grounds, Colombo

FB	15	Saliya Kumara
RW	14	Lasintha de Costa
OC	13	Gayan Weeraratne
IC	12	Pradeep Liyanage
LW	11	Nuwan Hettiarachchi
FH	10	Fazil Marija (vc)
SH	9	Roshan Weeraratne
N8	8	Sean Wijesinghe (c)
OF	7	Yoshitha Rajapaksa
BF	6	Danushka Perera
RL	5	Sajith Saranga
LL	4	Senaka Bandara
TP	3	Eranga Swarnatilleke
HK	2	Achala Perera
LP	1	Henry Terrance
Substitutes:
	16	Charith Seneviratne
	17	Kishore Jehan
	18	Bilal Hassan
	19	Sathya Ranatunga
	20	Nishal Meepage
	21	Keith Gurusinghe
	22	Prasad Chathuranga
Coach:
(New Zealand) Ellis Meachen

FB	15	Ross Armour
RW	14	Rowen Varty
OC	13	Lee Jones
IC	12	Tom McColl (c)
LW	11	Yui Ken Shing
FH	10	Keith Robertson
SH	9	Peter McKee
N8	8	Pale Tauti
OF	7	Nick Hewson
BF	6	Mark Goosen
RL	5	Renaud Chevans
LL	4	Mike Waller
TP	3	Nigel Hobbler
HK	2	Brent Taylor
LP	1	Alex Ng
Substitutes:
	16	Chik Man Hon
	17	Pete Spizziri
	18	Matthew Nuttall
	19	Terence Montgomery
	20	Tim Alexander
	21	Jamie Hood
	22	Alex McQueen
Coach:
(Wales) Dai Rees

Touch judges:

=== Week 4 ===
13 May 2011
20:00

United Arab Emirates	0–111	Japan
	Report

The Sevens, Dubai
Attendance: 2,000

FB	15	Tim Fletcher
RW	14	Sean Hurley
OC	13	John Beeton
IC	12	Duncan Murray
LW	11	Michael Hartley
FH	10	Jonathan Grady
SH	9	David Clouston
N8	8	Carl Von Rosenveldt
OF	7	Jamie Clarke
BF	6	Renier Els
RL	5	Mike Cox-Hill (c)
LL	4	Simon Osbourne
TP	3	Mike Riley
HK	2	David Vittes
LP	1	Chris Jones Griffiths
Substitutes:
	16	Dan Heal
	17	Dan Boatwright
	18	Lloyd Budd
	19	Scott Kerr
	20	Stuart Quinn
	21	Cyrus Homayoun
	22	Ali Mohammed
Coach:
(New Zealand) Bruce Birtwistle

FB	15	Go Aruga
RW	14	Kosuke Endo
OC	13	Taihei Ueda
IC	12	Ryan Nicholas
LW	11	Takehisa Usuzuki
FH	10	James Arlidge
SH	9	Atsushi Hiwasa
N8	8	Koliniasi Holani
OF	7	Michael Leitch
BF	6	Takashi Kikutani
RL	5	Justin Ives
LL	4	Hitoshi Ono (c)
TP	3	Nozomu Fujita
HK	2	Hiroki Yuhara
LP	1	Hisateru Hirashima
Substitutes:
	16	Takeshi Kizu
	17	Kensuke Hatakeyama
	18	Itaru Taniguchi
	19	Toetuu Taufa
	20	Fumiaki Tanaka
	21	Shaun Webb
	22	Goshi Tachikawa
Coach:
(New Zealand) John Kirwan

Touch judges:

14 May 2011
16:00

Kazakhstan	34–18	Sri Lanka
Try: dmitriy tkachenky 11' yevginiv shekurov 18'; Timur Mashurov 30', Daulet Akymbekov 68' pavel lenov 80'; Con: maxim lifontov (4/5) 18', 68', 80'; Pen: maxim lifontov (1/1) 70'	Report	Try: lasintha costa (2) 10', 24'; Con: numon hettiarachchi (1/2) 24'; Pen: numon hettiarachchi (2/2) 9'; 62'

National University Stadium, Almaty

=== Week 5 ===
21 May 2011
16:00 SLST

Sri Lanka	13–90	Japan
Try: Nuwan Hettiarachchi 10'; Con: Saliya Kumara 10' (1/1); Pen: Roshan Weeraratne 39' (1/1); Nuwan Hettiarachchi 68'	Report	Try: Takehisa Usuzuki 7'; Toetuu Taufa 22'; Alisi Tupuailei 28', 43', 63', 72'; Fumiaki Tanaka 32', 39'; Takashi Kikutani 35', 50'; Tanabe 66'; Hirotoki Onozawa 80'; Con: Shaun Webb 22', 32', 35 (3/5); Tanabe 39', 43', 63', 66', 72'(5/5)

CR & FC Grounds, Colombo
Referee: James Fitzgerald (UAE)

21 May 2011
16:00

Hong Kong	62–3	United Arab Emirates
Try: Alex Harris 15'; Pale Tauti 18'; Mark Goosen 24'; Nigel Hobler 34'; Nick Hewson 49', 61'; Ross Armour 28', 78'; Alex McQueen 66'; Jamie Hood 70'; Con: Keith Robertson 24', 39' (2/5); Tom McColl 49', 61', 70', 78' (4/5)	Report	Pen: Jonathon Grady 9' (1/1)

Hong Kong Football Club Stadium, Hong Kong

FB	15	Ross Armour
RW	14	Yui Ken Shing
OC	13	Tom McColl (c)
IC	12	Lee Jones
LW	11	Rowan Varty
FH	10	Keith Robertson
SH	9	Peter McKee
N8	8	Pale Tauti
OF	7	Mark Goosen
BF	6	Nick Hewson
RL	5	Michael Waller
LL	4	Renaud Chavanis
TP	3	NG Wai Shing
HK	2	Alex Harris
LP	1	Andrew Li
Substitutes:
	16	CHIK Man Hon
	17	Pete Spizziri
	18	Matthew Nuttall
	19	Terence Montgomery
	20	Tim Alexander
	21	Jamie Hood
	22	Alex McQueen
Coach:
(Wales) Dai Rees

FB	15	Tim Flether
RW	14	Sean Hurley
OC	13	Jonathan Beeton
IC	12	Duncan Murray
LW	11	Steve Smith
FH	10	Jonathan Grady
SH	9	Stuart Quinn
N8	8	Scott Kerr
OF	7	Carl Von Rosenveldt
BF	6	Renier Els
RL	5	Simon Osbourne
LL	4	Mike Cox-Hill (c)
TP	3	Dan Boatwright
HK	2	Dan Heal
LP	1	Chris Jones Griffiths
Substitutes:
	16	Andrew Millar
	17	David Clouston
	18	David Vittes
	19	Lloyd Budd
	20	Ali Mohammad
	21	Mohannad Saker
	22	Stephan Imbert
Coach:
(New Zealand) Bruce Birtwistle

Touch judges:

== Media coverage ==
The tournament is broadcast live in many different countries, some of which are listed below:

Nation(s)	Broadcaster
China	STAR Sports China
Hong Kong	STAR Sports Hong Kong
India	STAR Sports India
Malaysia	STAR Sports Malaysia

== See also ==
- 2011 Asian Five Nations division tournaments
