= Sri Lankans in Japan =

在日スリランカ人 Zainichi Surirankajin

Total population
- 79,128 (in December, 2025)

Regions with significant populations
- Tokyo, Ibaraki, Chiba, Funabashi, Kawasaki, Sagamihara, Saitama, Yokohama

Languages
- Sinhala, Tamil, English, Japanese

Religion
- Buddhism, Hinduism, Islam, Christianity

Sri Lankans in Japan consist of Sri Lankan migrants that come to Japan, as well as their descendants. In December 2025, there were 79,128 Sri Lankans living in Japan making it the 9th largest foreign community in Japan.

== History ==
=== Modern ===
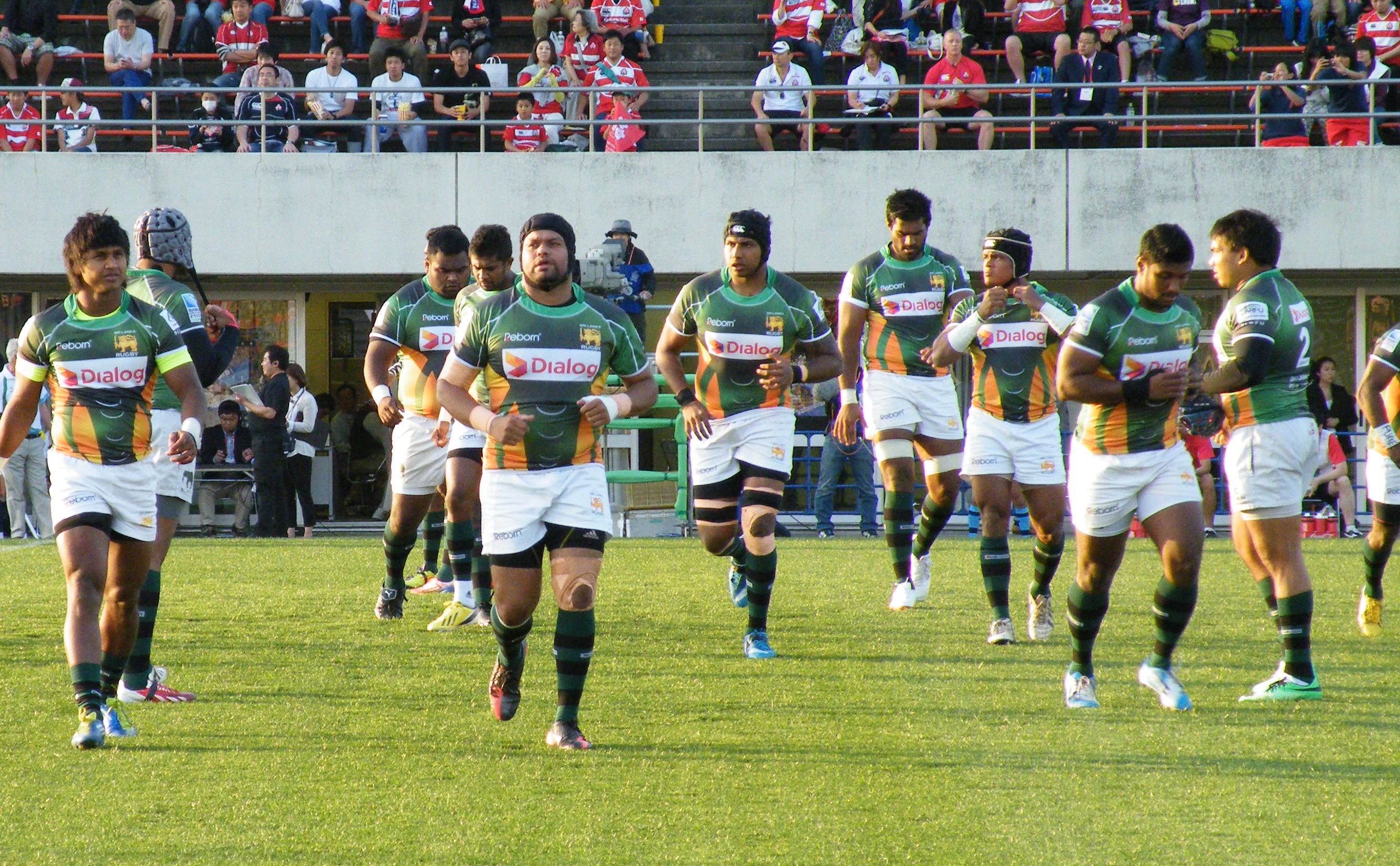
Sri Lankan rugby team at the Asian Five Nations

Japan is the leading team in rugby in Asia, and Sri Lanka is the leading Asian rugby team outside East Asia (ranking fifth overall, formerly second behind only Japan). Sri Lanka has lost every single competitive match it has played against Japan.

An ever increasing number of children from ethnic Sri Lankan background study at schools in Japan. Universities in Japan have started offering incentives to students from Sri Lanka.

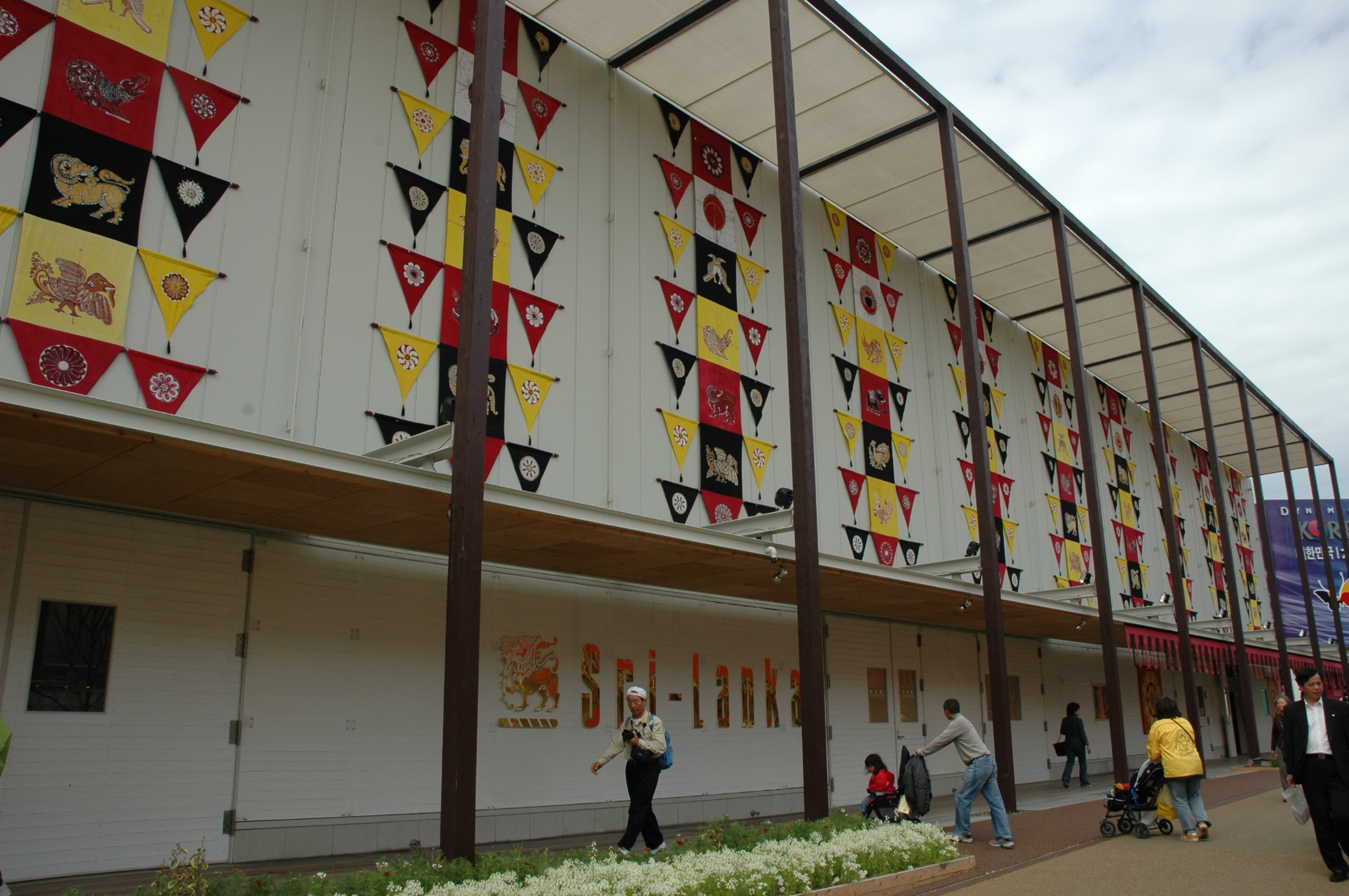
Japan expo pavilion in Nagoya, Aichi

Sri Lankans fill a gap in a number of professional categories including healthcare and ICT. Sri Lankans also have access to the 'Special Skilled Worker' category in nursing care, food service, construction and agriculture.

In May 2024 a 31-year-old woman from Sri Lanka who came to Japan in 2018 as the first technical intern trainee in the caregiving field completed her education and obtained a qualification as a caregiver.

== Issues ==
As with many Southeast Asian countries, corrupt predatory brokers often lure students and other workers into a cycle of debt by charging exorbitant recruitment fees that can require years of labor in Japan just to repay. Such emigration from Sri Lanka is often supported by Sri Lankan politicians and other connected figures such as brokers to take advantage of Japanese immigration issues, leveraging their influence to control recruitment agencies or bypass regulatory oversight for financial gain. Emigrants are frequently duped by recruitment intermediaries and politically connected sub-agents into paying unauthorized fees exceeding 1 million LKR, a practice that forces emigrants into debt to these brokers from Sri Lanka prior to arrival. With institutional corruption, the ecosystem of immigration is fueled by a "immigration industry" consisting of unregulated politically connected people, NGOs, and others who push emigration for personal financial gain.

Of the seventeen deaths involving immigration detention by all nationalities, one death of a Sri Lankan national who had overstayed her visa led to a campaign by the relatives of the deceased to obtain compensation. Other deaths include that of an Indian national, Nigerian national and Vietnamese national.

Sri Lankan nationals have been specifically noted by the National Police Agency (NPA) for involvement in specialized organized crime, along with Pakistani and Russian groups, rank in the top five nationalities involved in organized vehicle theft rings targeting high-end automobiles for international export.

== See also ==
- Japan–Sri Lanka relations
- Sri Lankan diaspora
- Immigration to Japan
