= Anura Senanayake =

Sri Lankan police officer and singer (died 2021)

Deputy Inspector General of Police
- In office December 2011 – 26 February 2021

Personal details
- Died: 26 February 2021
- Profession: Police officer, singer

Anura Senanayake (died 26 February 2021) was a Sri Lankan police officer and singer. He served as a deputy inspector general.

== Career ==
Anura joined Sri Lanka Police as a sub-inspector in 1973. He was also promoted as an inspector in 1981. He became a chief inspector in 1985.

He served as OIC of several police stations in Veyangoda, Kilinochchi, Ragama, Welikada and Weerangula. In 2008, he was appointed the director of the Colombo Crimes Division. He was promoted to senior DIG in December 2011. He was also regarded as a popular singer in 1980s and 1990s. He sang Maga Kirilli for a television program which became very much popular among rural people.

He studied at St. Servatius College, Matara.

Anura was arrested in 2016 for withholding evidence regarding the murder case of popular rugby union player Wasim Thajudeen. In 2019, he was released on cash bail of Rs. 1 million for his connection with the murder of Thajudeen. In February 2021, the court case against Anura was postponed to 31 May 2021 due to his illness. However, Senanayake died on 26 February 2021 due to prolonged illness and cancer.

== Discography ==
- Maga Kirilli
- Paya Ena Sande
- Sudu Rella
- Sanda Kinduru Kinduriyan
