= Rohitha Rajapaksa =

Sri Lankan cricketer (born 1989)

Personal information
- Full name: Chandana Rohitha Rajapaksa
- Born: 15 June 1989 (age 37); Colombo, Sri Lanka
- Relatives: Mahinda Rajapaksa (father); Shiranthi Rajapaksa (mother); Gotabaya Rajapaksa (uncle); Basil Rajapaksa (uncle); Chamal Rajapaksa (uncle); Namal Rajapaksa (brother); Yoshitha Rajapaksa (brother)

Rohitha Rajapaksa (born 15 June 1989) is a club cricketer in Sri Lanka and media personality. He is the youngest son of former Sri Lankan President Mahinda Rajapaksa. He has two elder brothers, Namal and Yoshitha.

He was a member of the Sri Lanka Navy Rugby team.

He attended S Thomas college in Mt.Lavinia.

He made his List A cricket debut on 27 October 2021, for Kalutara Town Club in the 2021–22 Major Clubs Limited Over Tournament.

== See also ==
- Rajapaksa family
