= Maxim Lifontov =

- Born: December 30, 1986 (age 39)

Rugby union career
- Position: Fullback
Senior career
Years	Team	Apps	(Points)
- Yenisy-STM
International career
Years	Team	Apps	(Points)
- Kazakhstan

Maxim Lifontov (Russian: Максим Вячеславович Лифонтов; born 30 December 1986) is a Kazakh rugby union player. He plays as a fullback.

He currently plays for the Russian professional team of Yenisey-STM Krasnoyarsk.

Lifontov is an international player for Kazakhstan. He was the top scorer in the 2008 inaugural Asian Five Nations. He also played in the 2011 Rugby World Cup qualification, where his National Team reached the repechage, being eliminated by Uruguay, in a 44-7 defeat at 17 July 2010, in Montevideo. He was once more the top scorer at the 2011 Asian Five Nations, with 54 points.
