= Wasim Thajudeen =

- Died: 17 May 2012 (aged 28) Narahenpita
- School: S. Thomas' College, Mount Lavinia

Rugby union career
Youth career
- -: Sri Lanka U19
Senior career
Years	Team	Apps	(Points)
2005-09	Havelock Sports Club		
National sevens team
Years	Team		Comps
2007-08	Sri Lanka		2008 Hong Kong Sevens

Mohammed Wasim Thajudeen (died 17 May 2012) was a Sri Lankan rugby union player who played for Havelock Sports Club and the national team. Thajudeen was killed in a car crash which was initially pronounced to be an accident but is currently being investigated as a murder.

== Life ==
Thajudeen was educated at S. Thomas' Preparatory School and S. Thomas' College, Mount Lavinia. He played rugby for the latter between 2001 and 2003, serving as vice captain in 2003. He played for the national under 19 schools team in 2003.

After school Thajudeen played for Havelock Sports Club. He represented the Sri Lankan national team at the 2008 Hong Kong Sevens. He was appointed captain of Havelock in 2009. In July 2009 Thajudeen won the "Most Popular Rugby Player" award at the 2008 Caltex Observer Rugby Awards. An injury forced him to stop playing. He was planning to make a comeback in 2012 when he was killed.

Thajudeen worked in the travel/tourism industry, at Mackinnons American Express Travel between 2003 and 2011 and at Citrus Vacations from 2011 till his death.

== Death ==
Thajudeen was killed on 17 May 2012 following what appeared to be a car crash. He was 28. According to the police Thajudeen had been driving to the airport when, around 1.00am, he lost control of his car and crashed into the wall of the Shalika grounds on Park Road, Narahenpita, resulting in the car exploding. Thajudeen was buried in the grounds of Dehiwala Mosque. It has been alleged that before his death he was in conflict with a 'young politician', likely Namal Rajapaksa, of the Rajapaksa administration over the acquisition of the Havelock Sports Club. The death was surrounded by mystery with wild rumours and speculations.

== Investigations ==
In February 2015, following a change in government, the police announced that Thajudeen's death was not accidental and that the investigation had been handed over to the Criminal Investigation Department (CID). According to the police the Judicial Medical Officer (JMO) had found the death to be suspicious. In May 2015 the Colombo Additional Magistrate ordered the JMO to hand over to the CID all photographs and notes relating to Thajudeen's death. The CID informed the magistrate in June 2015 that the post mortem and the Government Analyst's (GA) report were contradictory and that they had asked the Attorney General for instructions as to how to proceed. The magistrate ordered the four JMOs who visited the scene of the accident and conducted the post mortem to hand over their reports to the court. He also ordered mobile phone operators and the Telecommunications Regulatory Commission to hand over call records for 17 May 2012 for Thajudeen's mobile phone. In July 2015 Dialog Telekom informed the magistrate that they could not retrieve Thajudeen's mobile phone records due to "technical and practical limitation".

The CID informed the magistrate on 27 July 2015 that Thajudeen had been murdered. According to the CID Thajudeen's body showed signs of torture: his teeth and pelvic bones had been broken, his ribs had been fractured, his neck had been pierced with a sharp instrument and the muscles in his legs had been cut with a piece of broken glass. There were also signs that he had been assaulted with a blunt instrument. On 6 August 2015 the magistrate ordered the JMOs to exhume Thajudeen's body on 10 August 2015. In the meantime, his grave is being given protection to prevent any tampering.

In 2015 when Thajudeen's death was mentioned by a UNP MP Mujibur Rahuman in the parliament several UPFA members from Rajapaksa government obstructed him and threatened him. UPFA MPs Johnston Fernando, Indika Anuruddha and Sanath Nishantha surrounded him and stopped him from delivering his speech allegedly making death threats.

The police have claimed that the initial investigation into Thajudeen's death was shelved due to political pressure. The CID has claimed that there had been attempts to hide evidence during the initial police investigation - the police deliberately failed to obtain CCTV footage, phone records and testimony from neighbours, security guards at Shalika grounds and fire fighters who attended the incident. The police also failed to investigate the fact that Thajudeen's body was found on the passenger side of his car. The post mortem found carbon monoxide inside Thajudeen's lungs but the GA found no evidence of carbon monoxide. Thajudeen's wallet was found, without any signs of being burnt, in Kirulapone a few days after his death. The Daily Mirror newspaper claims to have found an eyewitness to the incident who saw two Land Rover Defenders at the scene. According to government minister Rajitha Senaratne Thajudeen has been killed by three members of the Presidential Security Division (PSD). Former Senior DIG Anura Senanayake and former Narahenpita Crimes OIC Sumith Perera were remanded for their alleged involvement and the CID began investigating the phone calls of Damian Fernando who was the Nrahenpita OIC during the time of the crime. The investigations revealed that Damian Fernando received several calls from the Presidential Secretariat right after the crime. The PSD officers who served under former President Mahinda Rajapaksa are currently under investigation, for telephoning the former Narahenpita OIC.

In September 2016 Senior State Counsel Dilan Ratnayake informed Court that investigations revealed that Carlton House of the Rajapaksa family in Hambantota had been included in the internal phone network connection of the Presidential Secretariat. It was also revealed that the former chief JMO Ananda Samarasekara had dispatched body parts of Wasim Thajudeen from the refrigerator a few days prior to his retirement and they are being investigated under the Public Property Act as the body parts had been taken into the former JMO's custody as case productions and, therefore belong to the state.

In 2025, the new NPP government who came in to power in 2024 re opened the murder case after new witnesses came forward with new CCTV footage. The new details revealed that some of the Rajapaksha family members are involved in the case and the family’s closest gang member "Kajja" was involved in the scene of the murder.
