= Yoshitha Rajapaksa =

Sri Lankan rugby player (born 1988)

- Born: Kanishka Yoshitha Rajapaksa; 12 June 1988 (age 38) Colombo, Sri Lanka
- Height: 1.80 m (5 ft 11 in)
- Weight: 92 kg (14 st 7 lb)
- School: S. Thomas' College, Mount Lavinia
- University: Britannia Royal Naval College, National Defense University of Ukraine
- Notable relatives: Father: Mahinda Rajapaksa; Mother: Shiranthi Rajapaksa; Brothers: Namal and Rohitha
- Occupation: Chief of Staff to the Prime Minister of Sri Lanka

Rugby union career
- Position: Number Eight/Flanker
Amateur team(s)
| Years | Team | Apps | (Points) |
| 2006-2015 | Navy SC | | |
International career
| Years | Team | Apps | (Points) |
- Sri Lanka
Coaching career
- Years: Team
- 2014-present: Ananda College, Colombo

Yoshitha Rajapaksa
- Military career
- Allegiance: Sri Lanka
- Branch: Sri Lanka Navy
- Service years: 2006-2020
- Rank: Lieutenant

Lieutenant Yoshitha Rajapaksa (born 12 June 1988) is a Sri Lankan sportsman and former naval officer. He is the second son of the sixth president of Sri Lanka, Mahinda Rajapaksa and served as the chief of staff to the prime minister of Sri Lanka.

He was a lieutenant commander in the Sri Lanka Navy and had been an aide-de-camp to the president. He is one of the owners of Carlton Sports Network one of the several organisations such as Carlton Pre school and Carlton rugby named after the Carlton House of the Rajapaksa. and was a former captain of the Sri Lanka national rugby union team and the Navy SC rugby team. He currently plays for the CH & FC in the Dialog Rugby League. His usual position is Flanker, but can also switch to Number 8.

On 30 January 2016, Yoshitha Rajapaksa and several senior executives of the Carlton Sports Network Channel were remanded by the Kaduwela Magistrate on charges of financial crimes including alleged charges on money laundering.

== Early life and family ==
He is the second son of Mahinda Rajapaksa and Shiranthi Rajapaksa. He has two brothers – Namal and Rohitha. His paternal grandfather D. A. Rajapaksa was a Member of Parliament and Minister of Agriculture and Land in Wijeyananda Dahanayake's government. His maternal grandfather, E. P. Wickremasinghe was a retired commodore in the Sri Lanka Navy.

Rajapaksa was educated at S. Thomas' College, Mount Lavinia.

Yoshitha Rajapakse married Nitheesha Jayasekera, daughter of businessman Ananda Jayasekara on 3 October 2019. The wedding was held at the Galle Face Hotel in Colombo.

== Naval career ==
=== Training ===
In 2006, he joined the Sri Lanka Navy as a cadet officer and received his basic training at the Naval and Maritime Academy where he was promoted to Midshipmen and appointed aide-de-camp to his father the President. Soon thereafter he proceed to Britannia Royal Naval College for his officer training and underwent training on board HMS Ocean during her deployment to the Caribbean and with the Fast Attack Flotilla. In 2009, he was commissioned as an Acting Sub Lieutenant in Executive Branch of the Sri Lanka Navy.

=== Decommission ===
In January 2015, he was decommissioned from then rank of lieutenant by his father President Mahinda Rajapaksa, soon after the latter's defeat at the 2015 Sri Lankan presidential election discharging him from the navy.

=== Suspension and investigation ===
Following the 2015 presidential election the Defence Secretary of Sri Lanka sent a letter to the Navy Commander directing a probe on how Yoshitha joined the Navy, how he received overseas scholarships and his alleged engagement in active politics and other activities while being a naval officer. Navy Spokesperson Commander Kosala Warnakulasuriya announced that the Navy has received a letter about Yoshitha from the Defence Secretary and that a probe will be launched into the issues being raised. Yoshitha's resignation letter has not been approved by the Navy Commander and he is serving at the Sri Lanka Navy headquarters.

Investigations by a Parliamentary Committee revealed in January 2016 that Yoshitha lacked the qualifications needed for enrollment in the navy, failing to get the minimum results after sitting twice for ordinary level exams. It was further revealed that the state spent over Rs.22.23 million for his training in the United Kingdom and Ukraine.

=== Reinstatement and resignation ===
Rajapaksa was reinstated on 25 September 2019, with effect from 28 February 2016 by the Navy Commander on orders of President Maithripala Sirisena to the rank of Lieutenant which he held in 2015. He was subsequently promoted to the temporary rank of Lieutenant Commander and appointed as an ADC to a flag officer on 2 October 2019, two days before his wedding that was held per naval traditions on 4 October 2019 in Colombo.

He resigned from the navy on 10 October 2020 and took up appointment as Prime Minister's chief of staff, having worked with his father during his suspension. During his naval career, he had gained a master's degree and PhD from the National Defense University of Ukraine.

=== Arrest on corruption charges ===
In June 2026, Rajapaksa was arrested by Sri Lanka’s Commission to Investigate Allegations of Bribery or Corruption in connection with corruption allegations relating to his naval career. The commission had alleged that his 2006 entry into the Sri Lanka Navy proceeded outside due process, using state funds to attend overseas training at Dartmouth in the United Kingdom.

=== Decorations ===
His awards include the Sri Lanka Armed Services Long Service Medal, the campaign medals Eastern Humanitarian Operations Medal, North and East Operations Medal, Purna Bhumi Padakkama, Fast Attack Craft (FAC) Squadron Pin and the Commendation Badge.

== Sports career ==
=== Rugby ===
In 2005 he made the S. Thomas' College's first XV rugby team and in his final year (2006) he captained the team.

In 2009 he was appointed captain of the Navy Sports Club Rugby team (a position that he currently retains) and in 2012 Rajapaska went on to captain the Sri Lanka national rugby union team, who were the runners-up in the 2012 Asian Five Nations Division 1 tournament in the Philippines. The national team, under Rajapaska's captaincy, were then successful in winning the 2013 Asian Five Nations Division 1 competition, which qualified them to compete in the 2014 HSBC Asian Five Nations tournament in Japan (the winner of which automatically qualified for the 2015 Rugby World Cup). Unfortunately Rajapaksa was injured and unable to compete in the 2014 HSBC Asian Five Nations.

Rajapaska was also a member of the national rugby sevens team, leading the team which won the Bowl at the 2011 Bourneo Sevens, and competing at the 2014 Commonwealth Games in Glasgow, Scotland.

In March 2014 Rajapaska was appointed as the head coach of the Ananda College rugby team.

Yoshitha Rajapaksa and his brother Rohitha Rajapaksa lost their captaincy of the Navy rugby team and the Army rugby team respectively after they were under probe for using assets under their fathers presidency. They were asked by authorities not to attend practices until further notice.

=== Shooting ===
In 2012 he won the International Practical Shooting Confederation (IPSC) President's Medal for the Standard Division at the National Handgun Championship – 2012 conducted by the National Rifle Association of Sri Lanka.

== Chief of Staff to the Prime Minister ==
In October 2020, Rajapaksa was appointed chief of staff to the prime minister of Sri Lanka, his father Mahinda Rajapaksa. The post was previously held by Sagala Ratnayaka, a Cabinet Minister and member of parliament. The Prime Minister's Office had clarified that the Rajapaksa's position is similar to that of an Additional Secretary.

Amidst the 2022 Sri Lankan protests against the then-incumbent government of his uncle, president Gotabaya Rajapaksa, it was reported in the local press that he left Sri Lanka on 9 May 2022 with his family.

== Controversies ==
=== Murder allegations ===
On 16 May 2012 Wasim Thajudeen, a Sri Lankan rugby player, died in a suspicious car accident in Colombo. It was initially reported that his car hit a wall on the road setting the car on fire and Thajudeen perished inside the car. After the defeat of President Mahinda Rajapaksa on 8 January 2015, Sri Lankan authorities reopened the case due to new evidence, and currently investigating it as a murder. Several news outlets have alleged that Yoshitha Rajapaksa is the mastermind behind the murder because of rivalry and jealousy over a former girlfriend. However, the former president Rajapaksa denied murder allegations against his son, claiming that the investigation is politically motivated.

=== Financial irregularities at the CSN ===
He was arrested under Section 32 of the Penal Code and was remanded in January 2016 by Kaduwela Magistrate Dhammika Hemapala over the alleged financial irregularities at the CSN, where he was unable to prove the funds use to run the TV station and misuse of public funds. Yoshitha is accused of money laundering to the tune of Rs. 365 million, criminal breach of trust, forgery and undervaluing imported items obtained by CSN. FCID detectives said that they had seized Rs. 165 million from the CSN bank account which not been accounted and the alleged funds for setting up the television channel are believed to be from illegal foreign sources.

== See also ==
- List of political families in Sri Lanka
