= Namal Rajapaksa =

Sri Lankan politician (born 1986)

Namal Rajapaksa MP
- ලක්ශ්මන් නාමල් රාජපක්ෂ நாமல் ராஜபக்ஷ
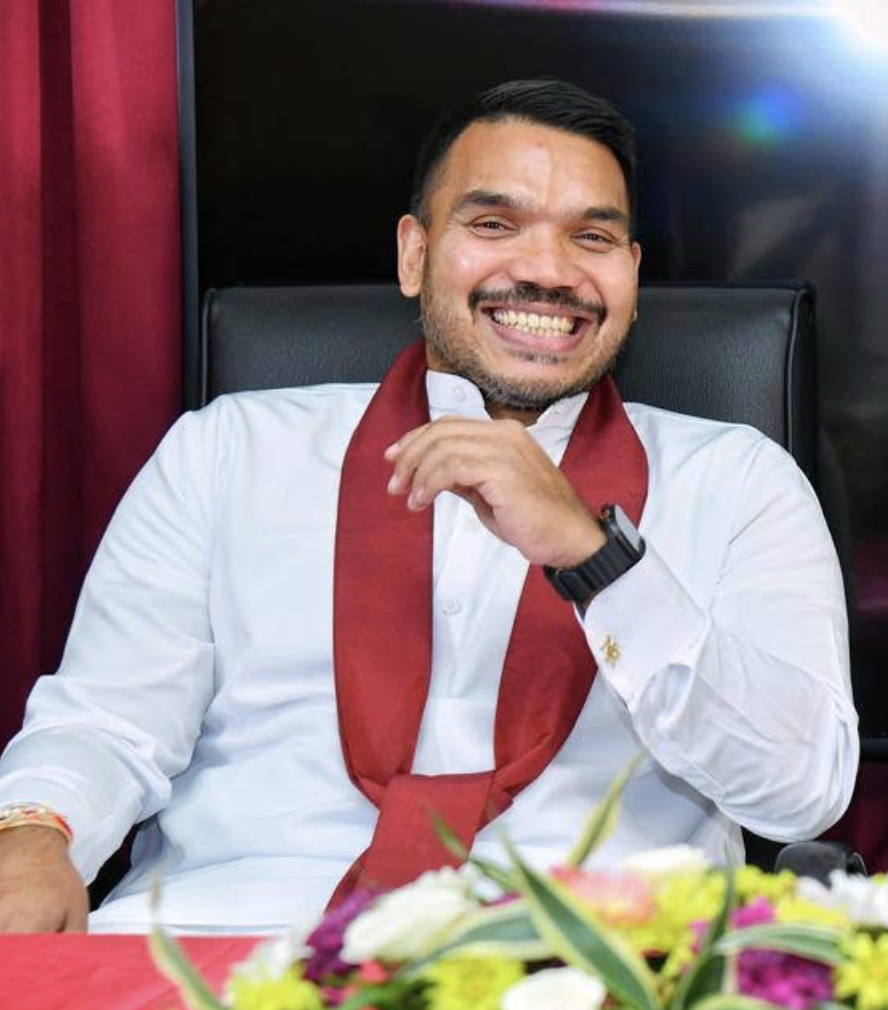
- Namal in 2026

Minister of Youth and Sports
- In office 12 August 2020 – 3 April 2022
- President: Gotabaya Rajapaksa
- Prime Minister: Mahinda Rajapaksa
- Preceded by: Dullas Alahapperuma
- Succeeded by: Thenuka Vidanagamage

Member of Parliament for National List
- Incumbent
- Assumed office 21 November 2024

Member of Parliament for Hambantota District
- In office 22 April 2010 – 24 September 2024
- Majority: 166,660 Preferential Votes

Personal details
- Born: Lakshman Namal Rajapaksa; 10 April 1986 (age 40) Colombo, Sri Lanka
- Party: Sri Lanka Podujana Peramuna
- Spouse: Limini Rajapaksa (m. 2019)
- Children: 2
- Parent(s): Mahinda Rajapaksa (father); Shiranthi Rajapaksa (mother)
- Education: S. Thomas' College; City University London; Sri Lanka Law College
- Occupation: Lawyer, Politician

Lakshman Namal Rajapaksa (Sinhala: ලක්ශ්මන් නාමල් රාජපක්ෂ, Tamil: நாமல் ராஜபக்ஷ; born 10 April 1986; known as Namal Rajapaksa) is a Sri Lankan lawyer and politician. He is the eldest son of former President and former Prime Minister Mahinda Rajapaksa and a member of parliament. He was the Minister of Youth and Sports from 2020 to 2022.

== Early life and family ==
Rajapaksa was born on 10 April 1986. He is the son of Mahinda Rajapaksa and Shiranthi (née Wickremesinghe). He has two younger brothers – Yoshitha and Rohitha. His paternal grandfather Don Alwin Rajapaksa was a member of parliament and Minister of Agriculture and Land in Wijeyananda Dahanayake's government.

Rajapaksa was educated at S. Thomas' College, Mount Lavinia, where he captained the school's 1st XV rugby team. After school, Rajapaksa attended Cardiff University to study law. He then went to City University London from where he graduated in September 2009 with a third-class degree law degree.

Rajapaksa then joined Sri Lanka Law College to qualify as an attorney at law. He sat for the college's preliminary exam in October 2009 and passed with second-class honours. It was alleged that Rajapaksa sat the exam in a special cubicle that was set aside for him and the college's principal accompanied him.

In December 2010, several media sources reported that Rajapaksa had allegedly received preferential treatment during his final examination at Sri Lanka Law College. A fellow law student, Thushara Jayarathna, alleged that Rajapaksa had been given a separate room along with an internet enabled computer, later filing a complaint with the Law College examination system, Keselwaththa police station and the Supreme Court.

Media and NGO sources reports that Jayarathna's complaints were largely ignored or rejected, although he appeared before the college authorities early in January 2011. After the incident, sources reported that Jayarathna had been allegedly abducted and beaten up by the police, and that he also received multiple death threats traced to the police and the college.

According to the principal of the college, an investigation had been held but it concluded that the allegations "were based on hearsay" and "unfounded". Although the official investigation didn't find anything irregular, the threats against Jayarathna have not been investigated. The Colombo Telegraph reported that the consequences of Jayarathna's reporting wasn't unusual and that he is one of several others who have been harassed or persecuted after filing complaints against the ruling family or the police. Chief Justice Asoka de Silva also questioned the investigation, saying "we have only one Law College in Sri Lanka. If there are suspicions over its credibility, it will affect the whole profession."

Rajapaksa was sworn in as an attorney at law on 15 December 2011 in front of a panel of Supreme Court judges including Chief Justice Shirani Bandaranayake.

== Sporting career ==
Rajapaksa played rugby for S. Thomas' College, representing the school at all age groups: under 9s, 13s, 15s and 17s. In 2000, he led the Sri Lankan national under 16 team. Rajapaksa first played for the school's senior team in 2002 and captained the 1st XV team in 2005. He also led the Sri Lanka under 19 team in 2004.

When he joined Cardiff University, he played in the university's rugby team from 2005 to 2006. He also played for City University London from 2006 to 2009. In 2009, he first played for the Navy SC, who he captained in 2010–2011. In 2010, Rajapaksa was invited to play for the Sri Lanka national rugby union team and in 2013 was appointed the team's captain, a position he retained until he retired from competitive rugby in July 2014.

== Political career ==
Rajapaksa contested the 2010 parliamentary election as one of the United People's Freedom Alliance's candidates in the Hambantota District and was elected to Parliament. Rajapaksa's father had been an MP for the Hambantota District for 16 years before he was elected president in 2005.

Many believed that Rajapaksa was being groomed to succeed his father as president. Rajapaksa was often seen at state events and was chief guest at several ceremonies inaugurating new roads, bridges, schools and other government buildings. Although Rajapaksa held no government position at the time, he made numerous official foreign trips, sometimes accompanying his father. In January 2011, Rajapaksa led a parliamentary delegation to Libya and met with Muammar Gaddafi. Rajapaksa also made official trips to the United Nations Headquarters (September 2010), Nepal (March 2011), Palestine (February 2012), Japan (March 2012), South Korea (April 2012), the United States (May 2012), China (May 2013) and Australia (June 2013). Rajapaksa also led Hambantota's unsuccessful bid to host the 2018 Commonwealth Games. Rajapaksa was a key figure of his father's unsuccessful 2015 presidential campaign. He was accused by many for his father's downfall and the misuse of public funds.

He was re-elected to Parliament in 2015 and 2020. In 2020, he was appointed as the Minister of Youth and Sports by his uncle, President Gotabaya Rajapaksa. However, he resigned from the position during the mass resignation of the Second Gotabaya Rajapaksa cabinet amidst the 2022 Sri Lankan political crisis.

Rajapaksa was appointed as the National Organizer of the Sri Lanka Podujana Peramuna on 27 March 2024. On 7 August 2024, the SLPP announced Rajapaksa as its candidate in the 2024 presidential election. He was the youngest candidate in the election. Rajapaksa was eliminated after the first vote count, placing 4th behind Anura Kumara Dissanayake, Sajith Premadasa and Ranil Wickremesinghe and winning only 2.57% of the popular vote.

Rajapaksa did not run for re-election for his parliamentary seat in the Hambanthota district in 2024, instead contesting as a member of the National List. This marks the first time in 88 years a member of his family did not contest from the district.

== Controversies ==
=== Tharunyata Hetak ===
Namal Rajapaksa and his brother Yoshitha started Tharunyata Hetak (A Tomorrow for Youth), a youth organisation, in 2005. Rajapaksa is chairman of Tharunyata Hetak, Yoshitha is vice-chairman. According to Transparency International Sri Lanka (TISL) Tharunyata Hetak spent Rs. 172 million promoting Rajapaksa's father and his party during the 2010 presidential and parliamentary elections. Tharunyata Hetak receives significant funding from public bodies including the Bank of Ceylon and National Lotteries Board both of which were under the control of Rajapaksa's father.

Namal Rajapaksa was arrested by the Financial Criminal Investigations Department (FCID) on July 11, 2016, on charges of money-laundering. This was in relation to the misuse of Rs 70 million that was given to him by an Indian real estate company in return for giving them premium land from the heart of Colombo CBD. According to his allies, the money was intended to be used for a rugby tournament but they have failed to prove how it was used. Rajapaksa allies claim the arrest as a politically motivated, but has no proof of how he earn the assets. The case is still pending.

He was arrested on 10 October 2017 by the Hambantota Police with two other MP's for charges of unlawful assembly, causing damage to public property, injuring police officers, obstructing their duty and violating a court order.

=== Carlton Sports Network ===
Carlton Sports Network is a sports, lifestyles and business television channel owned by Rajapaksa and his brother Yoshitha. Rajapaksa was a shareholder in Ascot Holdings PLC, and in September 2011 he owned 92,000 shares (1.15%) in the company. After Mahinda Rajapaksa's defeat in the 2015 presidential election, the new government of Maithripala Sirisena imposed a one-time tax of LKR 1 billion on the sports television channel, claiming that the sports channel has not paid any money to the government since its inception. CSN was allegedly favoured by the Rajapaksa government, which awarded it exclusive broadcast rights of several sports fixtures including cricket. State-owned TV channel Rupavahini had a monopoly over cricket broadcasting rights in Sri Lanka until the advent of CSN. The Rajapaksa government transferred sports broadcast rights to CSN by a cabinet decision with no open tender or any known competitive bidding process. After Rajapaksa's defeat, the new government launched a probe into the rights deal.

Namal Rajapaksa was investigated for money laundering after civil group Voice Against Corruption lodged a complaint against him to the FCID. According to the complaint, a company owned by Rajapaksa had purchased shares of another company using money obtained through methods violating the Money Laundering Act. As a result, the Colombo Chief Magistrate ordered several bank accounts related to the companies to be frozen for further investigation.

In August 2016, an arrest warrant was placed through Interpol on Oranella Iresha Silva, a suspect in an inquiry conducted under the Money Laundering Act for purchasing LKR 100 million worth shares of a company named Hellocorp using allegedly ill-gotten funds by Namal's Gowers Corporation. Controversial air hostess Nithya Senani Samaranayake of SriLankan Airlines was also arrested and remanded in August 2016 for her role in NR Consultations and Gowers Corporation as a director. She was released from the Airline at the request of then-incumbent Secretary to the President Lalith Weeratunga to handle Rajapaksa's "special projects" but continued to receive her basic salary as well as a "productivity allowance" in addition to other perks and promotions. Samaranayake was paid approximately Rs. 70,500 per month by the Airline while an additional fee of approximately Rs. 87,500 was paid by the Presidential Secretariat. When inquired, Samaranayake was unable to describe the exact location where she worked except for a place in Temple Trees and not the Presidential Secretariat. Additionally, she was able to recollect the name of only one official at Temple Trees and no "special projects" were identified where she was attached to. On 10 October 2017, Iresha Silva, who had been hiding in Dubai, was arrested at the Katunayake Airport by the CID.

=== Death of Wasim Thajudeen ===
Namal Rajapaksa was accused of being involved in the death of Wasim Thajudeen, a Sri Lankan rugby union player who played for Havelock Sports Club and the national team. Thajudeen was killed in a car crash on 17 May 2012 which was initially pronounced to be an accident but was later reopened as a murder investigation in 2015 following allegations by the victims family. Rajapaksa denied all allegations against him.

=== Law degree allegations ===
In 2025, Namal Rajapaksa’s legal qualification became the subject of public scrutiny after the Criminal Investigation Department (CID) of Sri Lanka initiated an inquiry into allegations that he irregularly obtained his Attorney-at-Law qualification from Sri Lanka Law College.

=== Money Laundering Allegations – NR Consultancy (Pvt) Ltd ===
The Criminal Investigation Department (CID) concluded an investigation into alleged money laundering involving Rajapaksa’s investment of Rs 15 million in NR Consultancy (Pvt) Ltd. Investigators claimed that the funds were sourced unlawfully. The CID forwarded the case file to the Attorney General’s Department for further action.

=== Acquittal in Gowers Corporation Case (2023) ===
Rajapaksa was previously charged in relation to alleged financial irregularities involving Gowers Corporation (Pvt) Ltd. In November 2023, the Colombo High Court acquitted him of all charges.

=== SriLankan Airlines Airbus Bribery Case ===
Rajapaksa was arrested by Sri Lanka's Commission to Investigate Allegations of Bribery or Corruption on 4 September 2026 on the allegation of accepting the equivalent of 100 million rupees from bribes paid by Airbus SE on an aircraft purchase by SriLankan Airlines. The money was given by Nimal Perera a Lankan businessman, after $800,000 from bribes paid by Airbus was deposited in to his account at OCBC Bank in Singapore, the CIABOC said.

Nimal was questioned by the CIABOC while he was in Australia. Namal was arrested upon his accusation.

== Personal life ==
Namal married Limini Weerasinghe on 12 September 2019 at Gangaramaya Temple. Their first son was born in 2020. The couple had their second child in August 2023.

== See also ==
- List of political families in Sri Lanka
