= Sean Wijesinghe =

Sri Lankan rugby sevens player

Wijelath Sean Mark Wijesinghe is a former Sri Lankan rugby sevens player. He currently serves as the head coach of the Nepal national rugby union team. During his playing career, he predominantly played in the positions of wing forward and also played as No 8. He migrated to Canada in 2019.

== Early life ==
He pursued his primary education at the Trinity College, Kandy. It was at Trinity College, where he learnt his skills in the rugby union and in his formative years, he received training from prominent rugby union coach Quentin Israel. He also took up basketball during his schooling days and took part in school basketball competitions.

== Career ==
He made his club rugby debut for the Kandy Sports Club in 2000. He captained Kandy Sports Club in 2008, and he assumed his second captaincy stint with the club in 2014. Under his captaincy, Kandy Sports Club emerged as winners of the 2014/15 Dialog Rugby League. He was part of the Sri Lankan side which competed at the 2011 Asian Five Nations. He last turned up for Sri Lanka in the international arena in 2015. He also played rugby in Taranaki, New Zealand, having plied his trade for a few clubs.

He obtained his rugby coaching and training abroad in Levels 1, 2, and 3. He also secured a coach educator certificate to prolong his career in professional rugby coaching. He later upgraded as a level II strength and conditioning coach. He coached Kandy Sports Club during the 2015/16 Dialog Rugby League season and was retained for the coaching position of the club, ahead of the 2016/17 season. He also coached Trinity College in 2016. He became the head coach of the Nepal rugby team in 2023, and his first major assignment after assuming the role was the men's rugby tournament during the 19th Asian Games in China.
