= Fazil Marija =

Sri Lanka international rugby union player

- Born: 4 December 1985 (age 40)
- Height: 1.82 m (6 ft 0 in)
- Weight: 85 kg (13 st 5 lb)
- School: Kingswood College, Kandy

Rugby union career
Senior career
Years	Team	Apps	(Points)
2004–2018	Kandy SC		
International career
Years	Team	Apps	(Points)
2003–2018	Sri Lanka	50+	
National sevens team
Years	Team		Comps
2003–present	Sri Lanka		

Fazil Marija (born 4 December 1985) is a former rugby union player of Sri Lanka. Marija is known as one of Sri Lanka's finest rugby union players and one of Asia's best. He was the former captain of the Sri Lanka national rugby union team. Marija comes from a sporting family background, with at least 17 members through two generations having represented various Clubs, Services Teams and National Rugby teams during the past four decades. Marija hails from the hill capital Kandy.

Marija retired from rugby union after the Clifford Cup knockouts, and his last match at Nittawela grounds was played on 11 February 2018. In 2019 Marija was appointed as the head coach of Kandy SC In November 2022, he was appointed as the head coach of Trinity College 1XV rugby team for a period of three years.

== School Rugby ==
Marija mastered his Rugby skills at Kingswood College, Kandy which is the first school to introduce schoolboy rugby to Sri Lanka back in the 1890s. Marija, represented his college teams from U-13 to U-20. He played for College 1st XV in 2003 as a fly half, and went on to lead them for an unbeaten triple championship in year 2004 as the captain of Kingswood College 1st XV. Marija became the best Schoolboy player in the Singer International 7's Tournament and also the Golden Key Schools 7's tournament, where Kingswood College won both Championships under his captaincy.

== U-16 Rugby Career ==
Marija first represented Sri Lanka in year 2000. In that year he toured for the first time with Sri Lanka National U 16 team for the Junior Rugby Asiad. While still at school, in 2003 he was called up by Sri Lanka Rugby Football Union (SLRFU) to be on the starting lineup at the match against touring Hong Kong at Nittawela Rugby Stadium, Kandy. In 2004, Marija commenced Club Rugby career by representing Kandy Sports Club in their 2nd round match against Havelocks Sports Club at Nittawela Stadium. He also went on to represent the Kandy SC in the Clifford Cup Knock out tournament matches in the same year. To date, he continues to represent Kandy Sports Club and during this period Kandy Sports Club went on to dominate the Rugby Headlines in Sri Lanka Rugby by winning the League and Knockout Tournaments continuously. He was adjudged ‘Most Promising Player of the Year -2004’ at the Caltex/Observer Rugby Awards at the end of the season. All this he did while he was still a school boy at Kingswood College. He went on to captain his Club, Kandy Sports Club, in 2010 Club Rugby season.

== National representation ==
Marija has represented Sri Lanka in numerous international tournaments, both in 7 a side and 15 a side. This exceeds 50 International fifteen a side matches and more than a century of 7 a side matches. He is the most capped Sri Lankan rugby player. Marija is the current captain of Sri Lanka 7's teams and he led Sri Lankan Tuskers in many International 7's tournaments (2008, 2012 and 2013) and also served as the Vice Captain of the Sri Lanka National Rugby Teams of 2011 and 2013. In 2010, he was invited to represent Asia Pacific Barbarians in Hong Kong and played alongside George Gregan, Justin Marshal, Christian Cullen, Hale Tipo and coach David Campese. Marija also had a three months training stint in 2013 at one of the elite Training Academies in New Zealand, Rugby Performance Centre in Auckland home for the Auckland Blues. He trained along with Northland ITM Cup Development Squad.

Some of his International assignments are; Singer International 7's (2005, 2006 and 2007), 2005 World Cup Rugby 7's qualifiers in Hong Kong, Commonwealth Games (2006 and 2014), Hong Kong 7's (2005-2008 and 2014) Asian 7's Series (Singapore, China, India, Malaysia) 2012 and 2013 (Thailand, Malaysia, India and Singapore), Asian 5 Nations Tournament (2011, 2012 and 2013). Under Fazil's leadership Sri Lanka ended as the 3rd Best Team in Asia in the 7's circuit in 2013 and won the Shield at the 2014 Commonwealth Games Rugby 7's at Glasgow, Scotland.

Marija has won numerous National Rugby Awards for his excellence in the field of Rugby. In 2007 and 2009, Marija became the Most Outstanding Player of the Year (Caltex Rugby Awards, Sri Lanka), in 2009 he was also recognised as the ‘Best Three Quarter’, in 2011 he became the ‘Best Ruggerite of the Year’ and in 2012 he became ‘Best Fly Half of the Year’.

In 2015, Marija was reappointed as the Sri Lankan captain and led the team to victory in the Asian Rugby Championship in the Philippines. He was replaced by Sudharshana Muthuthanthri as Sri Lankan skipper in 2016 after Marija was ruled out due to injury.

== See also ==
Rugby union in Sri Lanka
