= Dai Rees (rugby union, born 1964) =

Welsh rugby union footballer

- Born: David Rees; 23 September 1964 (age 62) Abercarn, Caerphilly County Borough, Wales
- Height: 180 cm (5 ft 11 in)
- Weight: 79 kg (12 st 6 lb)

Rugby union career
Senior career
Years	Team	Apps	(Points)
- Abercarn RFC
–	Newbridge RFC		
–	Newport RFC		
–	Cross Keys RFC		

David 'Dai' Rees (born 23 September 1964) is a Welsh former rugby union player. He attained four caps for the Wales B side, and was also a National Squad member in 1986.

Rees played club rugby for Abercarn RFC, the South Glamorgan Institute, Swansea RFC, Newport RFC and Newbridge RFC. He later became player/coach at Cross Keys RFC and Head Coach after a knee injury forced his retirement.

Rees was Assistant Coach to the Wales U21 side for the 2006–07 season was appointed Head Coach of the Wales Sevens team in October 2005.

In May 2006, Rees was appointed as Head Coach to the newly created Wales U20 side, whilst continuing in his role as Wales Sevens Head Coach and assistant coach to the Newport Gwent Dragons. He was Head Coach with Newport RFC but gave up this role at the end of the 2005–2006 season to concentrate on his Dragons coaching duties.

In July 2007 Rees relinquished his role of U20 Coach, to Patrick Horgan and was confirmed as the Wales Sevens Head Coach.

In October 2008 Rees accepted Hong Kong Rugby Football Union's offer to become new head coach of the Hong Kong national sides. On 23 April 2013, Dai Rees received the Coaching Excellence Award and Best Team Sport Coach Award at the Hong Kong Bank Foundation Coaching Awards Presentation.
