= Toetuʻu Taufa =

Japan international rugby union player

Toetu'u Taufa
- Born: October 8, 1980 (age 46) Nuku'alofa, Tonga
- Height: 1.83 m (6 ft 0 in)
- Weight: 105 kg (231 lb; 16.5 st)

Rugby union career
- Position: Loose forward
Senior career
Years	Team	Apps	(Points)
2004−2018	Kintetsu Liners	87	(135)
- Correct as of 15 January 2017
International career
Years	Team	Apps	(Points)
2009-2011	Japan	22	(10)

Toetu'u Taufa (born October 8, 1980 in Nuku'alofa) is a former Tongan-born Japanese rugby union player. He plays at the No. 8 position or at flanker. He plays for the Kintetsu Liners in Japan's Top League. Taufa debuted for Japan in 2009 against Kazakhstan. He made his first try for Japan in their game against Fiji in the Pacific Nations Cup in 2009.

Taufa made his World Cup debut at the 2011 Rugby World Cup, his only match was in their 23 all draw against Canada.
