= David Clouston =

Scottish agriculturalist, horticulturalist and author (1871–1948)

David Clouston FRSE (13 December 1871 – 18 April 1948) was a Scottish agriculturalist, horticulturalist and author. He served as Agricultural Advisor to India from 1923 to 1929. His expertise lay especially in the subject of grasses.

== Biography ==
He was born on Orkney on 13 December 1871.

He was the first representative of the Government of India on the Executive Council of the Imperial Agricultural Bureaux established in 1929, but was replaced in 1930 by M. A. Paranjpye

He studied agriculture to postgraduate level at the University of Edinburgh, receiving his D.Sc. in 1935.

In 1932, he was elected a Fellow of the Royal Society of Edinburgh, his proposers were James Drever, Sir William Wright Smith, Ernest Shearer and Sir Thomas Henry Holland.

He died in St Ola on Orkney on 18 April 1948, aged 76.

== Publications ==
See

- Lessons on Indian Agriculture (1920)
- Identification of Grasses in Non-flowering Condition
- Plant Diseases of the Garden (1932)
- From the Orcades to Ind (1936)
- The Establishment and Care of Fine Turf for Lawns and Sports Grounds (1939)
- The Story of the Orkney and Zetland Association (1946)
